= German Volleyball Player of the Year =

Annual sports award in Germany

The German Volleyball Player of the Year has been chosen annually since 1979 by the readers of the German Volleyball Magazin.

== German Volleyball Player of the Year ==
German Volleyball Player of the Year
YEAR	MALE	FEMALE
1979	Toni Rimrod	Silvia Meiertöns
1980	Burkhard Sude	Marina Staden
1981	Burkhard Sude	Marina Staden
1982	Burkhard Sude	Gabi Lorenz
1983	Burkhard Sude	Terry Place-Brandel
1984	Burkhard Sude	Marina Staden
1985	Lee Hee-Wan	Kim Ae-Hee
1986	Jörg Brügge	Sigrid Terstegge
1987	Gabor Csontos	Renate Riek
1988	Hauke Braack	Gudrun Witte
1989	Paul Schmeing	Gudula Staub
1990	Paul Schmeing (FRG)	Karen Baumeister (FRG)
1990	René Hecht (GDR)	Ariane Radfan (GDR)
1991	René Hecht	Ines Pianka
1992	Georg Grozer Senior	Susanne Lahme
1993	Michael Dornheim	Susanne Lahme
1994	Wolfgang Kuck	Grit Naumann
1995	Dirk Oldenburg	Ines Pianka
1996	Wolfgang Kuck	Sylvia Roll
1997	Wolfgang Kuck	Sylvia Roll
1998	Stefan Hübner	Ulrike Schmidt
1999	Stefan Hübner	Judith Flemig
2000	Holger Kleinbub	Angelina Grün
2001	Stefan Hübner	Angelina Grün
2002	Stefan Hübner	Angelina Grün
2003	Christian Pampel	Angelina Grün
2004	Björn Andrae	Angelina Grün
2005	Björn Andrae	Angelina Grün
2006	Björn Andrae	Angelina Grün
2007	Jochen Schöps	Angelina Grün
2008	Jochen Schöps	Angelina Grün
2009	Jochen Schöps	Christiane Fürst
2010	Georg Grozer	Margareta Kozuch
2011	Georg Grozer	Margareta Kozuch
2012	Georg Grozer	Margareta Kozuch
2013	Georg Grozer	Margareta Kozuch
2014	Georg Grozer	Margareta Kozuch
2015	Lukas Kampa	Maren Brinker
2016	Robert Kromm	Maren Brinker
2017	Lukas Kampa	Louisa Lippmann
2018	Lukas Kampa	Louisa Lippmann
2019	Moritz Reichert	Louisa Lippmann
2020	Lukas Kampa	Louisa Lippmann
2021	Björn Andrae	Louisa Lippmann
2022	Tobias Brand	Jennifer Janiska
2023	Georg Grozer	Pia Kästner
2024	Georg Grozer	Pia Kästner
2025	Erik Röhrs	Lina Alsmeier

Sources: Volleyball Magazin and German Volleyball Federation (DVV)

== See also ==
- German Sportspersonality of the year
- German Footballer of the Year
