= Jana Vollmer =

German beach volleyball player (born 1973)

Personal information
- Full name: Jana Vollmerová
- Nationality: German, Czech
- Born: 5 May 1973 (age 53); Mladá Boleslav, Czechoslovakia
- Hometown: Rottenburg am Neckar, Germany
- Height: 6 ft 1 in (185 cm)
Honours
Women's beach volleyball
Representing Germany
European Championships
Silver medal – second place	2000 Bilbao	Beach
Silver medal – second place	2003 Alanya	Beach

Jana Vollmer (also known as Jana Vollmerová, née Pechová, born 5 May 1973) is a Czech-born German female former beach volleyball player. Her family were of minority Bohemian German descent. In 1994, she played as part of the Czech Republic women's national volleyball team, featuring in the 1994 FIVB Volleyball Women's World Championship, where the Czech Republic finished ninth. On club level she played with TSG Tübingen where she met her husband, German volleyball coach Andreas Vollmer, with both subsequently working at clubs in Switzerland for several years.

Partnering Danja Müsch she claimed the silver medal for Germany at the 2000 European Championships in Bilbao, Spain.

== Playing partners ==
- Andrea Ahmann
- Danja Müsch
- Ines Pianka
- Ulrike Schmidt
