= Stefan Hübner =

German volleyball player (born 1975)

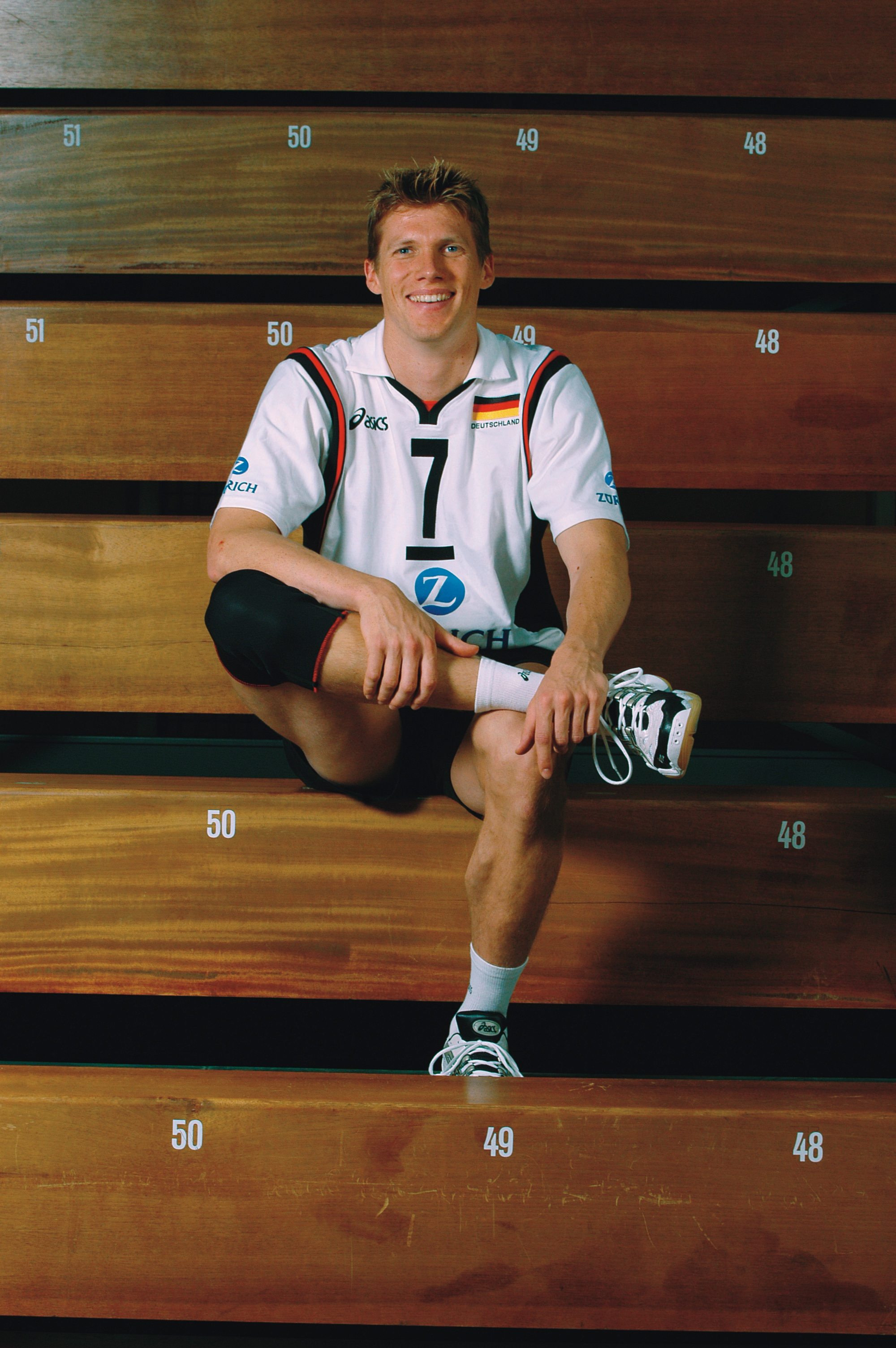
- Stefan Hübner

Personal information
- Full name: Stefan Hübner
- Nationality: German
- Born: 13 June 1975 (age 51); Bielefeld, North Rhine-Westphalia, West Germany

Stefan Hübner (born 13 June 1975 in Bielefeld, North Rhine-Westphalia) is a volleyball player from Germany, who played for the Men's National Team in the 1990s and the 2000s. He earned a total number of 226 caps for the national squad. He has been married to volleyball player Angelina Grün since 2012. The couple has two sons, Jakob (born 2014) and Benjamin (born 2017).

Awards
Preceded by Wolfgang Kuck	German Volleyball Player of the Year; 1998/1999	Succeeded by Holger Kleinbub
Preceded by Holger Kleinbub	German Volleyball Player of the Year; 2001/2002	Succeeded by Christian Pampel
