= Kuck =

Kuck may refer to:

- David Kuck (born 1937), American computer scientist
- John Kuck (1905–1986), American athlete
- Jonathan Kuck (born 1990), American speed skater
- Wolfgang Kuck (born 1967), German volleyball player
- Kuck Tawatao (born 1971), Air Canada Training Manager

== See also ==
- Johnny Kucks (1933–2013), American baseball player
