= György Grozer =

German volleyball player (born 1984)

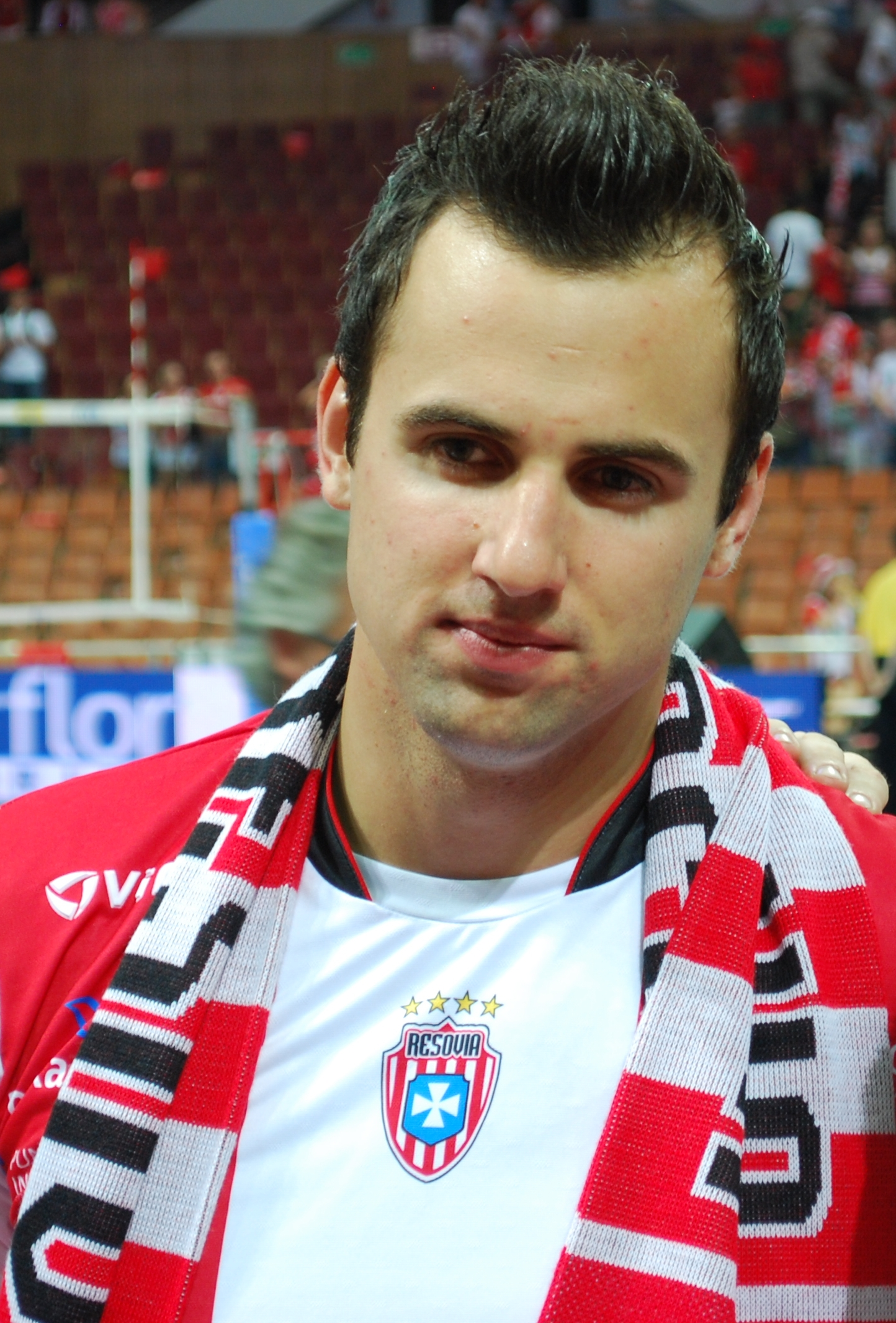
- Grozer wearing a Resovia jersey during his stint in PlusLiga

Personal information
- Nickname: Hammerschorsch
- Nationality: German
- Born: 27 November 1984 (age 41) Budapest, Hungary
- Height: 2.00 m (6 ft 7 in)
- Weight: 102 kg (225 lb)
- Spike: 374 cm (147 in)
- Block: 345 cm (136 in)

Volleyball information
- Position: Opposite
- Current team: Shanghai Bright
- Number: 9

Career
- Years: Team
- 1992–1998 1998–2000 2000–2002 2002–2008 2008 2008–2010 2010–2012 2012–2015 2015 2015–2016 2016–2017 2017 2017–2018 2018 2018–2020 2020–2021 2021–2023 2023–2025 2025 2025-2026 2025-2026 2026-: Vasas SC; Dunaferr SC; Kométa-Kaposvár SE; Moerser SC; Pallavolo Loreto; VfB Friedrichshafen; Asseco Resovia; Belogorie Belgorod; El Jaish; Samsung Bluefangs; Shanghai Golden Age; Al Arabi Doha; Lokomotiv Novosibirsk; Belogorie Belgorod; Zenit Saint Petersburg; Gas Sales Piacenza; Vero Volley Monza; Arkas İzmir; Warta Zawiercie; Shanghai Bright; Jakarta LavAni Livin’ Transmedia; Al-Ittihad

National team
- Years: Team
- –2006 2007–: Hungary; Germany
Honours
Men's volleyball
Representing Germany
FIVB World Championship
Bronze medal – third place	2014 Poland
CEV European Championship
Silver medal – second place	2017 Poland
European League
Gold medal – first place	2009 Azerbaijan

György Grozer (born 27 November 1984), also known as Georg Grozer or by his nickname Hammerschorsch, is a German professional volleyball player of Hungarian origin. He currently plays as an opposite spiker for Shanghai Bright and the Germany national team.

Grozer is widely known by the nickname "Hammerschorsch", a German compound word combining Hammer ("hammer") and Schorsch, a German diminutive of Georg that reflects his powerful attacking style.

== Personal life ==
Grozer was born in Budapest, Hungary. His father, György Grozer Sr.† was a former volleyball player and a coach. Grozer has two daughters, Leana and Loreen, from his first marriage. He is currently married to Czech volleyball player Helena Grozer (née Helena Havelková).

== Career ==
=== Club ===
Grozer began his career in Hungary with Vasas Óbuda (1992–1998), then played for Dunaferr SE (1998–2001) and Kométa Kaposvár SE (2001–2002), appearing in the CEV Top Teams Cup with both. In 2002 he moved to Germany to join Moerser SC. The newly promoted club was relegated from the 1. Bundesliga straight away in 2002–03, returned for 2004–05 and finished third, and reached the DVV-Pokal final in both 2006 and 2007, each time against VfB Friedrichshafen. His father, Georg Grozer Sr., became the club's coach in 2006. In April 2008, following the end of the German season, Grozer joined Italian second-division side Esse-ti Carilo Loreto on a short-term loan as cover for the injured Christian Dünnes.

In 2008 Grozer transferred to VfB Friedrichshafen, with whom he won the German championship in 2008–09 and 2009–10. He joined Poland's Asseco Resovia in 2010. In 2011–12 he helped the club win the PlusLiga title, finished as the league's top scorer (553 points) and best server (69 aces), and was named its most valuable player. Resovia also reached the final of the 2011–12 CEV Cup, losing to Dynamo Moscow.

In 2012 Grozer signed with Russian club Belogorie Belgorod. In 2012–13 Belgorod won the Russian Cup and the Russian championship; the following season they added the club's first Russian Super Cup and a second consecutive Russian Cup. In the 2013–14 CEV Champions League Belgorod beat Zenit Kazan in the Final Four semi-final and Halkbank Ankara 3–1 in the final in Ankara on 23 March 2014, and then won the 2014 FIVB Volleyball Men's Club World Championship. In 2014–15 Belgorod won a second Super Cup but were eliminated from the Champions League by Halkbank in the round of 12, and finished second in the Super League.

After a brief spell with Qatari club El Jaish in 2015, Grozer moved to South Korea for the 2015–16 season with the Daejeon Samsung Bluefangs. He made his V-League debut on 20 October 2015 and set single-match records for serve aces, with nine in November 2015 and fifteen in January 2016. In 2016–17 he played for Shanghai Golden Age, winning the Chinese championship, and had a short return to Qatar with Al Arabi Doha in 2017.

He returned to Russia in 2017 with Lokomotiv Novosibirsk. In February 2018 the club exchanged him with Belogorie Belgorod for Maxim Zhigalov, and he played the rest of the season in Belgorod. In July 2018 he signed with Zenit Saint Petersburg, where he spent two seasons (2018–2020) and reached the quarter-finals of the 2018–19 CEV Champions League.

Grozer moved to Italy in 2020, playing one season for Gas Sales Piacenza (2020–21) before joining Vero Volley Monza (2021–2023), where he won the 2021–22 CEV Cup. From 2023 to 2025 he competed in Turkey for Arkas Spor. In May 2025, right after his Turkish season ended, he joined Polish club Aluron CMC Warta Zawiercie on a medical transfer to replace the injured Karol Butryn for the PlusLiga final series, which Zawiercie lost to Bogdanka LUK Lublin.

For the 2025–26 season, Grozer returned to Shanghai Bright, helping the club finish third in the Chinese Volleyball Super League. After the Chinese season he joined Jakarta LavAni Livin' Transmedia as a replacement for Nato Dickinson for the final stage of the 2026 Proliga, winning the Indonesian championship. In May 2026, Grozer signed with Saudi Arabian club Al-Ittihad Club for the 2026–27 season.

=== National team ===
==== 2007 ====
After gaining German Citizenship, Grozer began playing for the national team in 2007. He made his debut that year at the CEV European Championship, where Germany finished 5th.

==== 2008 ====
In the same year, Germany earned a place in the World Olympic Qualification Tournaments. Germany hosted the first tournament of World Olympic Qualification in Düsseldorf from 23 to 25 May 2008, where they emerged as winners and secured direct qualification for the 2008 Summer Olympics in Beijing. György Grozer was part of the German squad that won the qualification tournament. However, he was not selected for the final roster that competed at the Summer Games.

==== 2009 ====
A year later, in 2009, he was part of the German squad that won gold at the CEV European League where he also earned the Best Blocker award. He was also part of 2009 European Championships squad. The Die Adler finished 6th in the competition.

==== 2010 ====
In 2010, Germany secured qualification for the FIVB Men's Volleyball World Championship by finishing runners-up in Pool I of the European qualifiers. Grozer scored a total of 22 points, emerging as Germany's fourth-best scorer behind Max Günthör, Björn Andrae, and Jochen Schöps.

===== World Championships 2010 =====
Grozer made his World Championship debut in 2010, when the tournament was held in Italy.

Germany was drawn into Pool F for the pool play stage of the 2010 FIVB Men's Volleyball World Championship, alongside Poland, Serbia, and Canada. Germany finished third in the pool with a 1–2 win–loss record, tied on points with Serbia and Canada but edged out on set and point ratios. They opened their campaign with a straight-sets loss to Serbia, followed by a tightly contested five-set defeat against eventual pool winners Poland. Germany closed the pool stage with a dominant 3–0 victory over Canada, which secured their advancement to the second round.

In the second round (Pool G), Germany faced Italy and Puerto Rico. They defeated Puerto Rico 3–0 but lost to Italy in four sets. Germany finished second in the pool and advanced to the third round.

In the third round (Pool R), Germany played against Brazil and the Czech Republic. They defeated the Czech Republic in straight sets but lost to Brazil 3–0, finishing second in the pool and advancing to the classification matches.

In the 5th–8th place semifinals, Germany lost to the United States 3–0 (25–22, 25–20, 25–23). They then faced Bulgaria, losing 3–0 (26–24, 26–24, 25–21) in the seventh-place match. Germany finished 8th overall in the tournament.

Grozer scored 104 points during the tournament, including 95 spikes, seven blocks, and two aces. He ranked 19th among the tournament's top scorers and was Germany's second-highest scorer behind Robert Kromm, who scored 108 points and ranked 12th.

Germany's eighth-place finish was its best result at the World Championship since reunification. The country's best overall result remained East Germany's fourth-place finish at the 1974 World Championship in Mexico.

===== World League =====
Grozer was included in the roster for the 2012 World League, after Germany qualified by finishing among the top 13 in the 2011 edition. The team went on to finish fifth, marking Germany's best performance in the competition to date.

===== 2012 Summer Olympics – Men's European qualification =====
Germany competed in the European Olympic Qualification tournaments held in France and Bulgaria in an attempt to qualify for the London 2012 Olympics. The tournament winner qualified directly for the Olympic Games.

Germany advanced from Pool A to the crossed semi-finals and final, eventually finishing 1st place in the tournament.

Germany advanced to the final, where they faced Italy at Arena Armeec in Sofia. Italy defeated Germany 3–2 (25–22, 26–24, 19–25, 22–25, 15–12) in five sets to secure direct qualification for the 2012 London Olympics. Grozer scored 28 points in the final, the highest total among players from both teams.

Across the tournament, Grozer played 9 matches (29 sets) during the tournament, scoring 135 points at an average of 4.66 points per set. He ranked second aming all scorers behind Spain's Iban Perez Manzanares.

===== 2012 World Olympic Qualification =====
Germany secured their ticket to the London 2012 Olympics by winning the FIVB Men's World Olympic Qualification Tournament held in Berlin. Germany finished first in the pool with eight points and a 3–0 win–loss record. The team defeated India (25–16, 25–19, 25–15), followed by a 5-set win against Cuba (25–21, 25–17, 21–25, 17–25, 20–18). They closed pool play with a 3–1 triumph over the Czech Republic (25–22, 23–25, 25–23, 25–21). The team finished with a total of 9 sets won and 3 lost, outscoring opponents 281–247 across all matches. This dominant performance helped secure Germany's qualification for the 2012 Olympics.

Individually, György Grozer scored 63 points in the tournament, including 45 spikes, 7 blocks, and 11 aces, ranking him as Germany's top scorer and the second-highest overall behind Jan Stokr of Czech Republic (70 points).

===== London Olympics =====
The indoor volleyball tournament was held at the historic Earls Court Exhibition Centre in West London from 29 July to 12 August 2012.

Germany was drawn into Pool B with Brazil, Russia, the United States, Serbia, and Tunisia.

Pool A	Pool B
Great Britain (Hosts)	Brazil (1)
Italy (3)	Russia (2)
Poland (4)	United States (6)
Argentina (8)	Serbia (7)
Bulgaria (9)	Germany (13)
Australia (22)	Tunisia (18)

====== Preliminary Round ======
Germany began the tournament against the eventual gold medalists Russia. The first set went to extra points, with Germany losing 29–31 despite having set points. Grozer scored 10 points (8 kills, 2 blocks), but the team was swept 0–3 (29–31, 18–25, 17–25).

Germany's next opponent was the United States, the defending Olympic champions. Led by Clayton Stanley and Matt Anderson, the Americans defeated Germany 3–0 (23–25, 16–25, 20–25). Grozer scored 12 points, including eight kills and four aces.

Against Serbia, Germany came back from a two-set deficit to win 3–2 (22–25, 27–29, 25–18, 25–20, 20–18). Grozer scored 39 points, the highest individual total in the match and, according to the cited source, a record for a men's Olympic volleyball match.

Grozer attempted 129 attacks, accounting for 44.2% of Germany's total. He recorded 29 kills at a 50.9% success rate and a 40.4% hitting efficiency, along with seven blocks, three aces, and eight digs. His 39 points exceeded the combined totals of Serbia's leading scorers, Aleksandar Atanasijević (22) and Miloš Nikić (16). As of 2026, his 39-point performance ranks second among individual scoring records in the Olympic rally-scoring era, behind Barbara Jelić-Ružić, who scored 44 points for Croatia at the 2000 Sydney Olympics.

Germany defeated Tunisia 3–0 (25–15, 25–16, 25–16) in their next pool match to qualify for the knockout stage. Grozer scored 11 points, including eight kills, one block, and two aces. Having secured a place in the quarterfinals as the fourth-placed team in Pool B, Germany rested Grozer for their final pool match against Brazil, which they lost 0–3.

====== Quarterfinals ======
Germany was eliminated in the quarterfinals on 8 August 2012, losing 0–3 (20–25, 16–25, 14–25).

Grozer led Germany with 12 points, recording 11 kills on 28 swings alongside 7 attack faults as Germany was limited to a 19.2% hitting efficiency. Germany finished the tournament tied for fifth place with Argentina, Poland, and the United States. Grozer concluded his Olympic campaign with 84 total points (65 kills, 11 blocks, and 8 aces), trailing tournament leaders Maxim Mikhaylov (148) and Tsvetan Sokolov (129) who both played in the medal rounds.

In a 2021 interview with Volleyball World, Grozer reflected on his debut Olympic experience and described it as a career highlight:

"The London 2012 Games was the biggest pleasure for me and I am thankful that I could be a part of it and enjoy the super atmosphere and the special energy of the Olympics. I was young. We were young and maybe the result would be different if we played again now, but anyway it was amazing for me,” he said.

==== 2013 ====
===== Eurovolley =====
Germany entered the 2013 European Championship. The team advanced to the Quarterfinals, where they were once again stopped by Bulgaria in a tight 1–3 loss (30–28, 25–27, 22–25, 20–25).. Grozer scored 16 points in the match, including 12 attacks, 3 aces, and 1 block. He recorded 12 kills from 46 attempts, with five attack errors and three attacks blocked by Bulgaria.

In the tournament's individual rankings, Grozer placed third among the top scorers with 172 points, behind Emre Batur of Turkey and Bram Van Den Dries of Belgium. He also ranked second in serving with 19 aces (0.59 per set), behind Dmitry Muserskiy, and ninth in blocking with 23 kill blocks (0.72 per set).

==== 2014 ====
In 2014, Germany was one of 40 teams that entered the qualification process for the Continental World Championship qualification. The team advanced to the third round, held in Ludwigsburg, where they were placed in Pool K alongside Croatia, Estonia, and Turkey. Germany swept the pool, securing qualification for the 2014 World Championship in Poland.

In the qualification rounds, Grozer appeared in only two matches, scoring a total of 33 points.

===== World Championship 2014 =====
The 2014 FIVB Men’s Volleyball World Championship was held in Poland. After qualifying, Grozer took part in his second World Championship, following his debut in 2010.

====== First Round ======
Germany opened its 2014 World Championship campaign with a straight-sets loss to Brazil, 0–3 (21–25, 19–25, 17–25). Despite the defeat, the opposite led Germany in scoring, finishing with 11 points. He converted 9 of 22 spike attempts, added 2 service aces, and contributed 3 block points.

Germany responded in its second pool match, sweeping Cuba 3–0 (25–16, 25–21, 25–19) at the Spodek Arena in Katowice, winning 75–56 in total points in a match that lasted 1 hour and 16 minutes. Their star attacker delivered a dominant all-around performance, finishing as the match's top scorer with 19 points. He was converted 13 of 19 spike attempts, 2 block points and 4 service aces.

Germany secured a 3–1 victory over Tunisia (25–13, 25–19, 21–25, 25–12) in its third pool match. Grozer played only in the fourth set, where he scored 5 points. Marcus Böhme led Germany in scoring with 12 points.

Germany claimed a 3–1 victory over Finland (25–20, 19–25, 26–24, 25–19). The opposite finished with 14 points, including 13 attacks and 1 service ace. Denys Kaliberda led the team with 17 points, while Marcus Böhme added 15.

Germany closed the first round with a 3–0 win over Korea (25–13, 25–16, 25–21). Grozer scored 10 points, including 6 spikes, along with 3 block points and 1 ace. The match concluded Germany's first-round campaign in the competition.

In a post-match interview following Germany's victory over Korea, head coach Vital Heynen emphasized the team's preparation and objectives.

“Our team was impressed by the Korean team. We prepared very well for today's match, with full respect for the opponent. We are happy because our goal was to stay in Katowice, and we have achieved that.”

====== Second Round ======
In the second round of the 2014 World Championship, Germany was placed in Pool E alongside China, Bulgaria, Russia, and Canada. They finished third in the pool with 5 match points from 2 wins and 2 losses, securing a spot in the next stage of the tournament.

Germany opened with a 3–0 win over China (25–19, 25–22, 25–17), with Grozer leading the scoring with 17 points, including 14 spikes, 2 blocks, and 1 ace. The following day, they defeated Bulgaria 3–1 (25–16, 25–15, 23–25, 25–17), where he delivered a standout performance of 19 points, adding 10 spikes, 1 block, and 8 aces.

Against Russian team, Germany fell 0–3 (17–25, 18–25, 24–26). Grozer remained the team's top scorer with 10 points, contributing 7 spikes, 1 block, and 3 aces, though it wasn't enough to secure a set. Germany closed the pool round with a hard-fought 3–0 win over Canada (28–26, 25–22, 25–23), where Grozer added 18 points to help secure the victory.

On the 2nd round, Grozer scored 64 points in four matches.

====== Third Round ======
Germany was placed in a three-team pool with France and Iran in Pool G. The team finished second with 1 win and 1 loss, scoring 3 match points and narrowly advancing based on set and point ratios.

The team opened with a 0–3 loss to France (15–25, 24–26, 22–25), where György Grozer led Germany in scoring with 14 points, including 12 successful spikes and 2 blocks.

Germany bounced back in their second match, defeating Iran 3–0 (25–15, 25–21, 25–19), with Grozer delivering a performance of 23 points, including 18 spikes, 1 block, and 4 service aces.

His scoring, combined with contributions from Marcus Böhme, Denys Kaliberda, and Max Günthör secured the victory. Germany's second-place finish in the pool allowed them to advance to the final stages of the tournament.

====== Semi-finals: Germany vs. Poland ======
Germany faced host nation Poland in the semi-finals of the 2014 FIVB Men's World Championship at the Spodek Arena in Katowice.

Poland began the first set with effective serving and blocking, quickly taking a 2–0 lead. Germany responded with a series of points led by György Grozer, whose ace extended Germany's lead to 8–4. Poland then narrowed the gap, with serves from Michał Winiarski and attacks from Karol Kłos. The set was tied at 23–23 before Poland won 26–24, with Michał Kubiak scoring the final point.

Poland also took an early lead in the second set. Germany remained within two points for much of the set, with Dirk Westphal and Max Günthör scoring for Germany. Grozer helped Germany level the score at 21–21 with his serving. Poland won the set 28–26 to take a 2–0 lead.

Germany won the third set 25–23. The teams remained close in the early stages before Germany moved ahead, with Grozer and Denys Kaliberda providing points in attack.

The fourth set was again closely contested. Germany led early, with Westphal and Jochen Schöps scoring points, but Poland regained the lead. Poland won the set 25–21 and the match 3–1, advancing to the World Championship final for the second time.

In the semi-final against Poland, György Grozer scored a total of 14 points for Germany, contributing 12 points from spikes, one block, and one service ace.

====== Bronze Medal Match: Germany vs France ======
Germany won the bronze medal at the 2014 FIVB Men's Volleyball World Championship after defeating France 3–0 (25–21, 26–24, 25–23) in the third-place match. The teams had previously met in the pool stage, where France won. György Grozer was Germany's leading scorer in the match with 19 points, followed by Denys Kaliberda with 13 and Sebastian Schwarz with 12. France's leading scorers were Antonin Rouzier with 12 points and Earvin N'Gapeth with 11.

Germany led for most of the first set, although France levelled the score at 11–11. Germany regained the lead and won the set 25–21, with Grozer serving an ace on the final point. Germany again led in the second set, reaching 14–11 before France took a 16–15 lead. Germany recovered and won the set 26–24. The teams exchanged leads in the third set before Germany took control late in the set. After Grozer missed a match point, Kaliberda scored the final point to give Germany a 25–23 win and the bronze meda

Grozer finished the tournament as Germany's leading scorer with 193 points, including 151 attack points, 16 blocks and 26 service aces. He trailed only Poland's Mariusz Wlazly (233 points) and France's Antonin Rouzier (204 points).

His teammate Denys Kaliberda recorded 129 spikes from 247 attempts, with an efficiency of 52.23%. He second among all spikers at the tournament behind Brazil's Ricardo Lucarelli (52.51%). Grozer was ranked 5th (151/310) with a success rate of 48.71% success rate.

Germany's Marcus Böhme recorded 27 stuff blocks during the tournament, averaging 0.63 per set. Grozer recorded 16 stuff blocks from 75 attempts, averaging 0.37 per set.

Grozer recorded 26 service aces from 166 attempts, averaging 0.60 aces per set. He was Germany's leading server and ranked among the tournament leaders in service aces.

The bronze medal was Germany's first medal as a unified nation at the FIVB Men's World Championship.

==== 2015 ====
Germany participated in the 2015 European Championships, finishing in 8th place. The team reached the quarterfinals in Sofia, where they were ultimately defeated by Bulgaria. During the tournament, György Grozer scored a total of 46 points, averaging 3.83 points per set.

==== 2016 ====
Germany hosted the 2016 European Olympic Qualification Tournament in Berlin, held from 5 to 10 January 2016, at the Max-Schmeling-Halle. The field was the hosts plus the top seven eligible teams in the CEV ranking. The winner qualified for the Rio Olympics, and the second- and third-placed teams advanced to the first World Olympic Qualification Tournament in Japan. Germany won all of its pool matches, finishing the group with a tie-break victory over world champions Poland on 8 January.[3] In the semifinal, Russia came from behind to beat the hosts 3–1 in front of a home crowd of about 6,900. The set scores were 33–31, 22–25, 19–25, 24–26 from Germany’s side.

Germany then met Poland again in the third-place match on 10 January, with the last European place in the Japan tournament at stake. Poland won 3–2 (25–20, 22–25, 25–16, 26–28, 14–16 from Germany’s side. Germany had a match point in the fourth set before Poland came back, and Poland went on to win the match. Germany finished fourth in the tournament. The loss left Germany with no chance of reaching the 2016 Olympics.

György Grozer finished the tournament as the second-highest scorer, accumulating 81 points across five matches at an average of 4.76 points per set, behind Poland's Bartosz Kurek, who scored 86 points.

==== 2017 ====
After missing Rio 2016, the team arrived in Szczecin, Poland for EuroVolley 2017.

===== Pool stage =====
Germany performed well and topped in the group stage held at the Netto Arena in Szczecin, winning all three matches to top the group and advance to the quarterfinals. The Germans won the opening match against Italy (25–22, 21–25, 19–25, 25–19, 15–8), where Germany recovered from a 1–2 set deficit to win in a tie-break. The best player of the match was the German opposite with 28 points. That was then followed by a clear sweep against Czech Republic and Slovakia where Grozer scored 19 points against the Czechs, but did not play in the third game against Slovakia.

===== Quarterfinals =====
The German team and the Czechs faced off again on Quarterfinals where Germany won 3 -1 (25–22, 16–25, 25–23, 25–20). György Grozer was again the decisive factor, scoring a match-high 23 points (19 attack points, 2 ace, and 2 block). While the Czech Republic relied heavily on Michal Finger (21 points) and the serving pressure of Donovan Džavoronok which had 3 aces, Germany's block defense (12 blocks vs. 8) made the difference in the final two sets.

This victory set up the semifinal against Serbia.

===== Semifinals =====
In the first semifinal of the 2017 European Championship, Germany defeated Serbia 3–2 (24–26, 15–25, 25–18, 27–25, 15–13) to reach the European Championship final for the first time. Germany trailed 0–2 in sets and faced two match points in the fourth set before winning the final three sets. The victory secured Germany its first European Championship medal, surpassing its previous best finishes of fourth place in 1991 and 1993. Serbia won the first two sets, 26–24 and 25–15. Germany won the third set 25–18 and levelled the match after taking the fourth set 27–25. Germany then won the deciding set 15–13. A video challenge was used on the final point of the tie-break before the point was awarded to Germany.

György Grozer was Germany's leading scorer with 20 points, while Serbia's Uroš Kovačević scored 19.

In the post-match interview, the German national team coach Andrea Giani shared his thoughts after winning the match:

"It was an incredible match, especially since we lost two sets at the beginning. It is important for our players to believe that they can win, and it is important to fight until the end. We won many matches before this tournament, because we worked a lot and improved our system of play. When we came back to the court after the break, we did a good job especially with our spikers and blockers. Our game in defence was very important in this match as well."

===== Finals =====
In the final of the 2017 European Championship, Germany faced Russia and lost 2–3. It was Germany's first appearance in a European Championship final. Russia won the match 25–19, 20–25, 25–22, 17–25, 15–13 to win the gold medal, while Germany took silver.

György Grozer was Germany's leading scorer with 27 points, including 20 attacks, five blocks and two service aces. Russia's leading scorer was Maxim Mikhailov with 19 points, while Dmitriy Volkov recorded five blocks. Maxim Mikhaylov was subsequently named the tournament's Most Valuable Player.

Russia took an early 7–2 lead in the first set. Germany levelled the score at 14–14 before Russia regained the lead and won the set. Germany led 6–2 in the second set and maintained the advantage to win 25–20, levelling the match at one set apiece.

The third set remained close, with Grozer serving an ace to make the score 12–12 and Lukas Kampa serving an ace to give Germany a 17–16 lead. Russia then moved ahead and won the set 25–22.

Germany led 16–10 in the fourth set and extended the advantage to 21–12. Germany won the set 25–17 to force a deciding set.

Germany started the decider with huge momentum, leading 5–2. However, unforced errors allowed Russia to claw back and take a 7–6 lead. A scary moment occurred when Grozer fell and appeared injured, but he stayed in the match to score immediately after. With the score tied late, Russia's experience prevailed, and Mikhailov scored the championship-winning point.

After the match, the coach of Germany shared his thoughts:

"We played an incredible match tonight, in our head this is a victory... I can say with pleasure that I love my players, because they remained always focused; they showed a lot of power and energy."

The head coach of the winning team Sergey Shlyapnikov speaks about how tough it was for the rest of the Russian team:

"It was a tough final match, but it is a final of a European Championship so it cannot be an easy game. We started the match very well; however, Germany soon improved their game. I was aware that anything could happen here, because we were fighting for the gold medal. So even when Germany led 5–2 in the tiebreak, I still believed in our victory and I said it to my players as well."

With the conclusion of the 2017 European Championship, the final standings were set. Germany's silver medal qualified them directly for the 2019 European Championship.

György Grozer scored 117 points in five matches and 22 sets, averaging 5.32 points per set.

Grozer recorded 12 service aces and 11 blocks during the tournament, averaging 0.55 aces and 0.50 blocks per set, respectively. He was selected to the tournament's Dream Team.

The silver medal was Germany's best result at the European Championship since reunification, improving on its previous best finishes of fourth place in 1991 and 1993. Germany did not reach the final in the subsequent editions of the tournament.

==== 2018–2020: World Championship absence and Olympic heartbreak ====
Following the silver medal at the 2017 European Championship, the German national team entered a period of stagnation and missed opportunities. The team failed to qualify for the 2018 FIVB World Championship marking their first absence from the tournament since 2006. In 2019, they were unable to replicate their European success, exiting the European Championship in the quarterfinals after a 0–3 loss to Poland.

The era culminated in January 2020, when Germany hosted the European Olympic Qualification tournament in Berlin, aiming to secure the sole remaining ticket to the Tokyo Olympics.

===== 2020: Road To Tokyo =====
The qualification pathway for the men's volleyball tournament at the 2020 Summer Olympics in Tokyo consisted of two main stages: the Intercontinental Olympic Qualification Tournament held in August 2019, followed by the Continental Olympic Qualification Tournaments, which offered a final opportunity for teams that had failed to qualify earlier. Each continental qualifier awarded only one Olympic berth, making the European tournament a high-stakes, winner-take-all event.

Germany entered the CEV Tokyo Volleyball European Qualification Tournament 2020 as hosts. The event was held at the Max-Schmeling-Halle in Berlin from 5 to 10 January 2020 and featured eight European teams competing in a do-or-die format, with only the tournament winner earning a place at the Tokyo Games.

====== Group Stage (Pool A) ======
Germany was drawn into Pool A with Slovenia, Belgium and the Czech Republic. Germany opened the tournament with a 3–0 victory over the Czech Republic and followed it with another 3–0 win against Belgium. In the final pool match, Germany lost to Slovenia 2–3. Germany advanced to the semifinals as the runner-up of Pool A.

====== Semi Finals ======
On 9 January 2020, Germany defeated Bulgaria 3–1 (25–20, 25–23, 20–25, 25–23) in the semifinal. The match was decided in the closing stages by György Grozer, who scored the winning spike on match point. Grozer finished as Germany's top scorer with 17 points.

====== Finals ======
Germany faced France in the final. France defeated Germany 3–0 (25–20, 25–20, 25–23) to win the tournament and qualify for the 2020 Summer Olympics. Germany remained within reach of France in all three sets but was unable to win a set. Antoine Brizard and libero Jenia Grebennikov were among France's players in the match.

The result left Germany without a place in the men's volleyball tournament at the 2020 Summer Olympics. Grozer scored 20 points for Germany in the final.

=== Retirement ===
Following the European qualifier, Grozer announced his retirement from the German national team for the 2nd time, first being in 2016, bringing an end to a long international career.

On his Instagram account, he posted:

“It's been a while since I’ve posted my last post, but it's still hard to say and express my feelings.

We worked so hard as a team to get to the Olympic games but this hard qualification system stopped us right in front of the open door. And that's it, only one team can go and chase a dream and I'm really sorry that that team is not our team.

But what I want to say.... A big thanks goes to everyone who supported us, who helped us and believed in us until the last ball that hit the floor.

It was a great pleasure to fight in previous years alongside my teammates from @team_germany_volleyball and everyone else involved.

We have achieved very important goals together and I am proud of all the steps we have taken together.

Danke schön”

=== Return to the National team ===
Germany sought to qualify for the men's volleyball tournament at the 2024 Summer Olympics in Paris, which would have been its first Olympic appearance since the 2012 Games in London. Qualification was determined through the FIVB Road to Paris Olympic Qualification Tournaments (OQTs).

==== 2024: Road to Paris ====
Germany secured participation in the OQTs based on their position in the FIVB World Rankings. As of 12 September 2022, Germany was the 17th-highest-ranked non-qualified team. Russia was excluded from the qualification process following its suspension in connection with the invasion of Ukraine. Germany therefore qualified for the 24-team OQT field.

Germany (ranked 17th) was placed in Pot 5, alongside Mexico (18th) and Tunisia (19th). Using the serpentine system, Germany was drawn into Pool A, hosted by Brazil in Rio de Janeiro. This placement resulted in a challenging group that included the host nation Brazil (ranked 4th) and the reigning World Champions, Italy (ranked 2nd), as well as Iran, Cuba, Ukraine, Czech Republic, and Qatar.

===== vs. Iran =====
Team	Set 1	Set 2	Set 3	Set 4	Total Points
Germany (GER)	25	22	25	25	97
Iran (IRI)	22	25	16	21	84

Germany recorded 59 attack points compared to Iran's 40. György Grozer was the match's top scorer with 23 points, including 3 aces. Outside hitter Moritz Karlitzek contributed 17 points, all from attacks. For Iran, Amirhossein Esfandiar led the scoring with 11 points, followed by middle blocker Mohammad Valizadeh with 10 points.

===== vs. Cuba =====
Team	Set 1	Set 2	Set 3	Set 4	Total Points
Germany (GER)	21	25	25	25	96
Cuba (CUB)	25	14	22	15	76

Following their opening win against Iran, Germany faced Cuba on 1 October 2023. Germany lost the first set but won the match 3–1. György Grozer was the match's leading scorer with 24 points, including 22 attacks, one block and one service ace.

===== vs. Brazil =====
After winning two consecutive matches, Germany faced the host team in the historic Maracanãzinho in Rio de Janeiro on 3 October 2023. Germany once again shocked the entire volleyball world with a 3–1 win against the pool favorites, Brazil.

Team	Set 1	Set 2	Set 3	Set 4	Total Points
Germany (GER)	21	25	25	28	99
Brazil (BRA)	25	19	19	26	89

György Grozer was Germany's leading scorer with 27 points. Germany won the fourth set 28–26 to complete a 3–1 victory over Brazil.

In a post-match interview, Grozer said:

"I have goosebumps, I can't believe what we did here today,” the opposite said on his way out of the court. “I want to congratulate the entire team, it's an incredible result and we’re still processing it."

The victory moved Germany into second place in Pool A with three wins and nine points. Germany's next match was against reigning world champions Italy.

===== vs. Italy =====
Less than 24 hours after defeating Brazil, Germany faced reigning world champions Italy. Germany won the match 3–1, moving to the top of Pool A as the only undefeated team.

Team	Set 1	Set 2	Set 3	Set 4	Total Points
Germany (GER)	26	18	25	25	94
Italy (ITA)	24	25	20	23	92

György Grozer scored a tournament-high 31 points (27 kills, 3 blocks, 1 ace). Moritz Reichert and Anton Brehme provided crucial support with 12 points each.

===== vs. Czechia =====
After a rest day, Germany resumed play against the Czech Republic. Germany won the match 3–0 to maintain its unbeaten record in the tournament.

Team	Set 1	Set 2	Set 3	Total Points
Germany (GER)	25	25	25	75
Czech Republic (CZE)	23	18	17	58

Grozer scored 14 points, with 13 attack points and an ace.

===== vs. Qatar =====
Germany secured an Olympic qualification place with a 3–0 victory over Qatar. The win guaranteed Germany a top-two finish in Pool A.

Team	Set 1	Set 2	Set 3	Total Points
Germany (GER)	25	25	25	75
Qatar (QAT)	15	20	16	51

Middle blocker Anton Brehme led the scoring with 14 points (12 kills, 1 block, 1 ace), while Grozer added 13 points.

====== vs. Ukraine ======
Team	Set 1	Set 2	Set 3	Total Points
Germany (GER)	25	25	25	75
Ukraine (UKR)	17	12	14	43

With qualification already secured, Germany played its final match against Ukraine on 8 October 2023. Germany won 3–0 to finish the tournament with a 7–0 record. The result confirmed Germany's first Olympic appearance since the 2012 Games in London. Captain and opposite György Grozer scored 13 points in the match and said after the game:

"This is crazy, it's such an incredible feeling, I can't even understand it. That shows you should never stop believing in your dreams. That's what we did and we're going to Paris."

The improbable nature of Germany's undefeated run was a major talking point in the volleyball community. On the 9x9 Volleyball Podcast, hosts Rob St. Claire and Everett Delorme discussed the team's dominance in their emergency coverage of the qualifier. Everett Delorme:

"...no one could've seen this Rob. ...No one, could've predicted how dominant they were, how clean they've looked, how much of an absolute monster Grozer is. This was something else. We may never see a German team this good ever again."

Rob St. Claire:

"...they destroyed everyone they've played"

György Grozer finished as the second-highest scorer in the entire tournament.

Best Scorers

Rank	Player Name	Team	Points	Attack	Block	Serve
1	Ferre Reggers	BEL	146	132	132	12
2	György Grozer	GER	132	112	112	11

Best Attackers

Grozer finished behind Belgium's Ferre Regers and Egyptian player Rada Haikal.

Rank	Player Name	Team	Points	Errors	Attempts	Avg/Match	Success %
1	Ferre Reggers	BEL	132	35	35	18.86	54.77
2	Reda Haikal	EGY	115	41	41	16.43	54.77
3	György Grozer	GER	112	26	26	16.00	54.63

He also tallied 11 stuff blocks, and 16 digs.

Germany completed the tournament with a 7–0 match record, winning 21 of 25 sets and finishing first in Pool A. The result secured Germany's qualification for the 2024 Summer Olympics in Paris.

Germany entered the Rio de Janeiro OQT ranked outside the top 15 in the FIVB World Rankings and defeated Brazil and Italy, both of which were ranked in the top five. Germany won all seven of its matches without playing a fifth set.

The qualification ended a 12-year Olympic absence for the German men's national team, following failed qualification attempts for the 2016 Rio and 2020 Tokyo Olympic Games.

Germany also achieved the highest point gain of 59.34 in the FIVB World Ranking during the 2024 Olympic Qualification Tournament, climbing six positions in the standings.

==== Paris 2024 ====
Ahead of the 2024 Summer Olympics in Paris, all final rosters for the volleyball tournament were released on 9 July 2024, confirming 312 athletes across 24 teams set to compete from 27 July to 11 August 2024. Initially, teams announced wide rosters of up to 25 athletes in June, but the final squads were narrowed to 13 players each (12 competitors plus one reserve). This marked the first time in Olympic volleyball history that a non-competing athlete could be included as a last-minute replacement in case of injury or illness, an increase from the previous limit of 12 athletes per team.

He was the only opposite selected for the squad of the Germany men's national volleyball team at these Olympics.

===== Drawing of Lots =====
The drawing of lots for the men's tournament took place on 26 June 2024 in Łódź, Poland, organized by the FIVB (Fédération Internationale de Volleyball) to determine the preliminary round pool compositions. Teams were seeded based on the FIVB World Rankings, and France, as the host nation, was automatically placed at the top of Pool A. The remaining teams were drawn into three pools of four using a serpentine system to ensure balanced competition.

Germany was placed in Pool C, alongside Japan, the United States, and Argentina, setting up a competitive group stage in which each team played all others in the pool. The top two teams from each pool, along with the two best third-placed teams, advanced to the quarterfinals.

The official YouTube broadcast of the drawing of lots can be viewed here.

====== Pool Composition – Men's Volleyball, Paris 2024 ======
Pool A	Pool B	Pool C
France (Hosts)	Poland (1)	Japan (2)
Slovenia (3)	Italy (4)	United States (5)
Canada (9)	Brazil (6)	Argentina (8)
Serbia (10)	Egypt (19)	Germany (11)

In a Men's Volleyball Pool Preview produced in collaboration with 9×9 Volleyball Podcast and Volleyball World, host Rob St. Claire identified Germany's reliance on their veteran opposite as a central talking point. Discussing the team's outlook, he pointed out the importance of György Grozer's leadership and role as the primary scorer, noting the rarity of such a team structure in the modern men's game:

“...it's kind of a throwback to a previous era of volleyball, when the men's game was dominated by a high-volume scoring opposite with that level of physicality, something teams are rarely built around anymore. It has an old-school feel, reminiscent of the era when Grozer took the world by storm in the late 2000s and throughout the 2010s.

The question now is whether he can replicate what he did last year (at the Olympic Qualifiers) in Rio at age 39. That question alone has the potential to turn this pool on its head, and possibly influence the entire Olympic tournament. I can't overstate how important Grozer's level of play is to Germany and to what happens across this competition.

.... it's just so fascinating how important this tournament's going to be for this team based on the oldest player in the field. watch him Georg Grozer, and enjoy him while you can."

===== Match Number 1: Germany vs. Japan =====
Germany opened their Paris 2024 Olympic campaign with a five-set victory over Japan, ranked No. 2 in the world, in their Pool C opener at the South Paris Arena. The match was Germany's first Olympic men's volleyball appearance since the 2012 London Games and gave the team its first Olympic victory since those Games.

Japan entered the match as favorites but were immediately put under pressure by Germany's aggressive serving and dominant blocking. Germany surged to an early 9–2 lead in the opening set, fueled by strong attacking from György Grozer and Tobias Brand, and closed the set convincingly 25–17.

Japan responded in the second set, recovering from an early deficit to level the score at 23–23. A German block error followed by a quick middle attack from Taishi Onodera and a decisive kill by Yuki Ishikawa allowed Japan to take the set and even the match at one set apiece. Momentum briefly shifted in Japan's favor in the third set, with Yuji Nishida leading the offense in a 25–20 win to give Japan a 2–1 lead.

Germany regrouped in a tightly contested fourth set. After trailing early, the Germans rallied to a 19–16 advantage behind renewed pressure at the net. The set extended beyond regulation, with both teams exchanging match points. At 28–28, Anton Brehme delivered a crucial block to give Germany set point, before a Japanese attack error sealed the set 30–28, forcing a deciding fifth set.

In the final set, Germany established control early, opening a 7–3 lead and maintaining their blocking advantage. Japan stayed within reach, but Germany's net defense proved decisive. At 14–12, Moritz Karlitzek scored the match-winning point to secure a 3–2 victory.

Germany finished the match with an 18–8 advantage in blocks, a key statistical factor in the upset. György Grozer led the German scoring effort with 24 total points, including 15 attacks, five blocks, and four aces.

Item	Details
Match	Japan vs Germany
Stage	Pool C
Result	Germany won 3–2
Sets	Five
Venue	South Paris Arena
Date	27 July 2024
Top scorer (GER)	György Grozer – 24 points

Grozer was Germany's leading scorer in the match with 24 points. He recorded 15 attack points, five blocks and four service aces. He was Germany's top scorer in each of the five sets.

===== Match Number 2: Germany vs. USA =====
Germany's momentum from their opening-day upset was tested in their second Pool C match, as they fell to the United States in another five-set contest at the South Paris Arena. Despite rallying from a two-set deficit, Germany were unable to complete the comeback, losing 3–2 in a match.

The United States controlled the opening phase of the match, applying consistent service pressure and maintaining a stable side-out game. Led by Matthew Anderson, the Americans held Germany at bay in the first set and closed it 25–21 with an ace from Aaron Russell. Their dominance was more pronounced in the second set, where Torey DeFalco capped a strong attacking performance with a block to seal a 25–17 win and a two-set lead.

Germany responded decisively in the third set. Capitalizing on American errors and improving their efficiency in attack, the Germans surged to an early 7–2 lead and never relinquished control. Moritz Karlitzek spearheaded the offense and finished the set with a decisive spike to secure a 25–17 win. Germany carried the momentum into the fourth set, breaking away after an early deadlock and leveling the match at two sets apiece with a 25–20 victory, powered by Karlitzek and György Grozer.

The deciding fifth set swung early in Germany's favor at 5–4, but a sustained serving run by Maxwell Holt, including consecutive aces, allowed the United States to seize control. Despite Germany's late push, the Americans closed the tie-breaker 15–11, with DeFalco earning match point before a German service error ended the contest.

The United States finished with an advantage from the service line, recording 11 aces compared to Germany's six, a key factor in the outcome. Moritz Karlitzek led Germany with 21 points, while György Grozer added 16 points, continuing his consistent scoring output in Pool C play.

Item	Details
Match	United States vs Germany
Stage	Pool C
Result	United States won 3–2
Set scores	25–21, 25–17, 17–25, 20–25, 15–11
Venue	South Paris Arena
Date	30 July 2024
Top scorer (GER)	Moritz Karlitzek – 21 points
Top scorer (USA)	Torey DeFalco – 18 points
Service aces	USA 11 – Germany 6

Grozer scored 16 points for Germany, including 12 attacks, two blocks and two service aces. He was Germany's leading scorer in the third and fourth sets as Germany recovered from a 2–0 deficit to force a deciding fifth set against the United States. Grozer's 16 points marked his second consecutive double-digit scoring performance in Germany's Pool C campaign.

===== Match Number 2: Germany vs. Argentina =====
Germany closed their Pool C campaign at the Paris 2024 Olympic Games with a straight-sets victory over Argentina, securing a decisive win that confirmed their advancement from the group stage. The match took place at the South Paris Arena, with Germany delivering a controlled and efficient performance against the defending Olympic bronze medalists, who were eliminated without earning a point in pool play.

Germany asserted control early in the match through superior efficiency at the net and from the service line. Their block-defense system limited Argentina's attacking options, while consistent side-out play allowed the Germans to maintain scoreboard pressure throughout the opening set. Germany's offensive balance and reduced error count proved decisive as they steadily built separation.

Argentina attempted to respond through Facundo Conte and Vicentin, but Germany's structure in transition and blocking presence prevented sustained momentum shifts. The Germans continued to widen the gap in the second set, capitalizing on opponent errors and winning extended rallies to maintain control of the match.

In the final set, Germany further imposed themselves physically, finishing with clear advantages in attacks, blocks, and service points. Argentina struggled to break through the German block, while Germany converted efficiently in key moments to close the match in straight sets and secure a comprehensive Pool C victory.

Germany finished the match with a 75–55 advantage in total points, including advantages in attacks (36–30), blocks (9–5), and service points (9–3). György Grozer led all scorers for Germany, once again anchoring the offense and providing stability in transition.

Item	Details
Match	Germany vs Argentina
Stage	Pool C
Result	Germany won 3–0
Venue	South Paris Arena
Date	Pool play – Paris 2024
Top scorer (GER)	György Grozer – 16 points

Grozer led Germany's scoring for the 2nd time in Pool C match, finishing with 16 points, including 11 attack points, four blocks, and one ace.

===== Quarterfinal Elimination: Germany vs. France =====
Germany were eliminated from the men's volleyball tournament at the Paris 2024 Olympic Games after a five-set defeat to hosts and defending champions France in the quarterfinals. The match, played at the South Paris Arena, ended 3–2 in favor of France (18–25, 26–28, 25–20, 25–21, 15–13), following a comeback from a two-set deficit by the French side.

The quarterfinal represented a high-stakes all-European clash between two long-standing continental rivals who had faced each other multiple times in major international competitions. Meeting again on the Olympic stage, arguably the highest level of the sport, added further weight to the encounter, particularly with France playing at home and Germany appearing in their first Olympic men's volleyball tournament since 2012.

Germany made a strong start, controlling the opening two sets through disciplined blocking, efficient side-out play, and consistent scoring from György Grozer. The Germans edged a tightly contested second set in extended play to take a 2–0 lead and put the hosts under significant pressure in front of a partisan crowd.

France responded in the third set, gradually shifting momentum behind improved defensive coverage and increased offensive efficiency. Led by Earvin N'Gapeth and Clévenot, the French leveled the match by winning the third and fourth sets, forcing a deciding tie-break. In the fifth set, both teams exchanged leads, but France capitalized on key points late to close the match 15–13 and secure progression to the semifinals.

Despite the loss, Germany pushed the eventual gold medalists to the limit and finished the match narrowly behind France in total points (107–109). Grozer led all scorers for Germany with 22 points, while Anton Brehme and Tobias Krick provided significant contributions at the net. The match later came to be regarded as a turning point in France's Olympic campaign, with the hosts going on to defeat Italy in the semifinals and Poland in the gold medal match to successfully defend their Olympic title.

Item	Details
Match	France vs Germany
Stage	Quarterfinals
Result	France won 3–2
Sets	18–25, 26–28, 25–20, 25–21, 15–13
Venue	South Paris Arena
Date	Knockout stage – Paris 2024
Best scorer (GER)	György Grozer – 22 points

====== Key performers – György Grozer ======
Grozer was Germany's leading scorer at the 2024 Summer Olympics, finishing with 78 points across the tournament. He recorded 55 attack points, 15 blocks and eight service aces, ranking 10th among all players in total points.

Following the 2024 Summer Olympics, Grozer continued his international career with the Germany national team. Although he confirmed that Paris 2024 would be his final Olympic appearance, he said in August 2024 that he intended to remain available for Germany and hoped to compete at the 2025 World Championship in the Philippines.

==== 2025 ====
Grozer was not initially used during the 2025 Volleyball Nations League, as Germany gave greater playing time to younger players. He returned to the squad for the third week of the competition in Chiba, Japan, making an appearance against the United States.

In September 2025, Grozer captained Germany at the 2025 FIVB Men's Volleyball World Championship in the Philippines. He scored 19 points in Germany's 3–0 victory over Chile and finished the tournament with 40 points across three matches. Germany was eliminated in the pool stage following a 3–1 defeat to Slovenia.

==== 2026 ====
In 2026, Grozer remained available for Germany under new head coach Massimo Botti and was included in the team's 30-player extended roster for the Volleyball Nations League. Grozer was also included in Germany's preparations for the 2026 European Championship, but was left out of the final squad after failing to reach full fitness.

== Honors ==
=== Club ===
- CEV Champions League
  - 2013–14 – with Belogorie Belgorod
- FIVB Club World Championship
  - Brazil 2014 – with Belogorie Belgorod
- CEV Cup
  - 2011–12 – with Asseco Resovia
  - 2021–22 – with Vero Volley Monza
- Domestic
  - 2008–09 German Championship, with VfB Friedrichshafen
  - 2009–10 German Championship, with VfB Friedrichshafen
  - 2011–12 Polish Championship, with Asseco Resovia
  - 2012–13 Russian Championship, with Belogorie Belgorod
  - 2016–17 Chinese Championship, with Shanghai Golden Age
  - 2016–17 Qatari Cup, with Al Arabi Doha

=== Individual awards ===
- 2008: European League – Best scorer
- 2009: European League – Best blocker
- 2010: German Volleyball Player of the Year
- 2011: German Volleyball Player of the Year
- 2012: German Volleyball Player of the Year
- 2013: German Volleyball Player of the Year
- 2014: German Volleyball Player of the Year
- 2016: Asian Club Championship – Best opposite spiker
- 2017: Asian Club Championship – Best opposite spiker
- 2017: CEV European Championship – Best opposite spiker

=== Records ===
- 39 points in one match – Olympic Games 2012 record
- 15 aces in one match in Korean League.

=== Statistics ===
- 2011–12 PlusLiga – Best scorer (553 points)
- 2011–12 PlusLiga – Best server (69 aces)

Awards
Preceded by (Spain) Guillermo Falasca	Best Scorer of European League; 2008	Succeeded by (Slovakia) Martin Nemec
Preceded by (Slovakia) Tomáš Kmeť	Best Blocker of European League; 2009	Succeeded by (Portugal) João Carlos Malveiro
Preceded by (Italy) Ivan Zaytsev	Best Opposite Spiker of CEV European Championship; 2017	Succeeded by (Serbia) Aleksandar Atanasijević
