= Sigrid Terstegge =

German volleyball player (born 1960)

Personal information
- Nationality: German
- Born: 3 June 1960 (age 64); Münster, West Germany (now Germany)
- Height: 186 cm (6 ft 1 in)

Sport
- Sport: Volleyball

Sigrid Terstegge (born 3 June 1960) is a German former volleyball player. She competed in the women's tournament at the 1984 Summer Olympics.

Awards
Preceded by Kim Ae-Hee	German Volleyball Player of the Year; 1986	Succeeded by Renate Riek
