= Wülfrath =

- Town
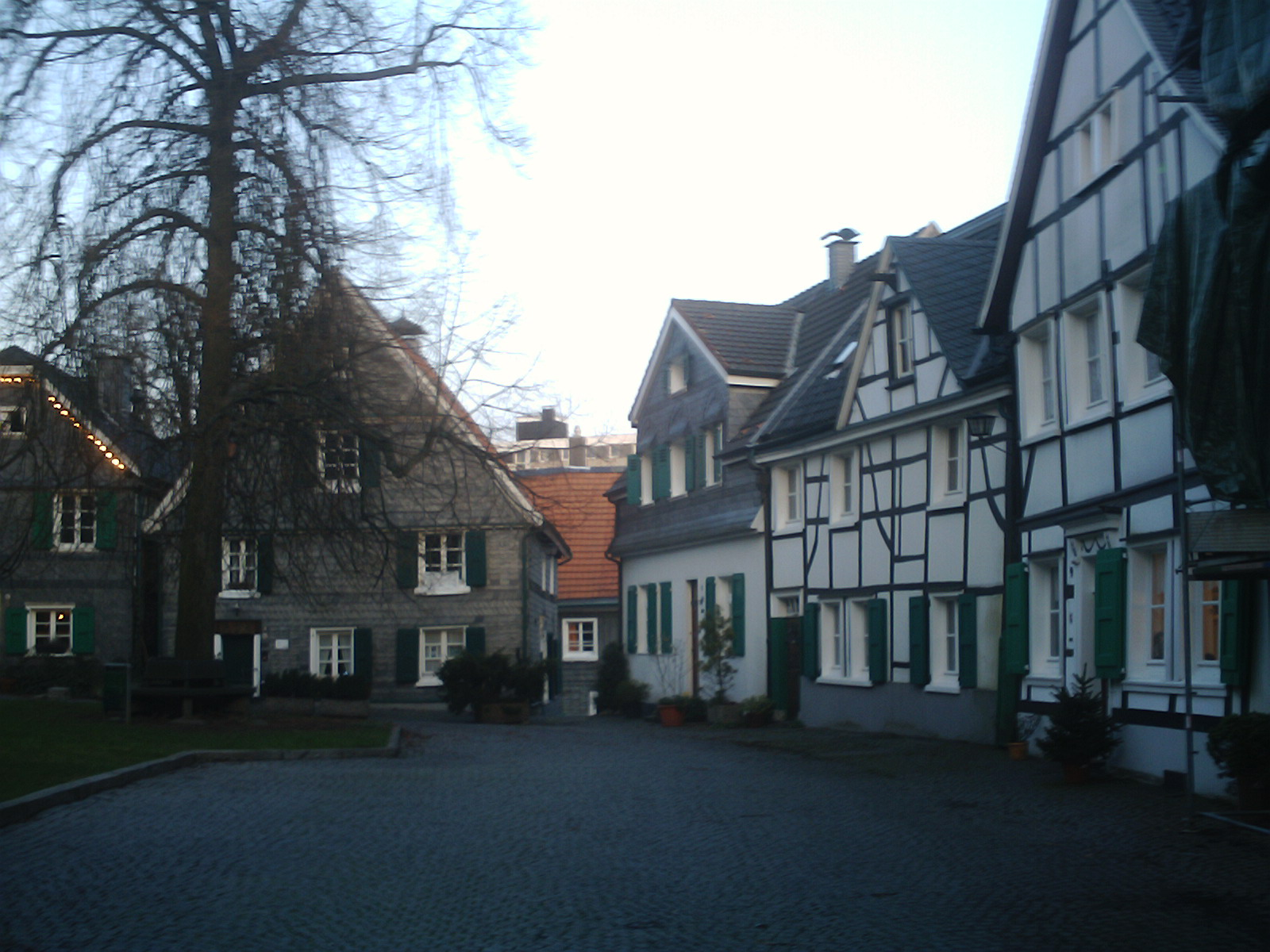

- Flag Coat of arms

- Location of Wülfrath within Mettmann district
- Interactive map of Wülfrath
- Location within Germany Location within North Rhine-Westphalia
- Coordinates: 51°17′N 7°02′E
- Country: Germany
- State: North Rhine-Westphalia
- Admin. region: Düsseldorf
- District: Mettmann
- Subdivisions: 8

Government
  - Mayor (2025–30): Sebastian Schorn (CDU)

Area
  - Total: 32.27 km^{2} (12.46 sq mi)
- Elevation: 262 m (860 ft)

Population (2025-12-31)
  - Total: 20,704
  - Density: 641.6/km^{2} (1,662/sq mi)
- Time zone: UTC+01:00 (CET)
  - Summer (DST): UTC+02:00 (CEST)
- Postal codes: 42489
- Dialling codes: 02058
- Vehicle registration: ME
- Website: www.wuelfrath.de

Wülfrath (German pronunciation: [ˈvʏlfʁaːt]) is a town in the district of Mettmann (district), in North Rhine-Westphalia, Germany. A variety of the Limburgish language, known locally as Wülfrother Platt is spoken through all generations in the town.

== Geography ==
The town is situated on the mountain spurs of the Bergische Land, between the Rhine, Ruhr and Wupper rivers. It is located in the central part of the Berg region, approx. 12 km northeast of Düsseldorf.

The old town centre lies in the small valley of the Angerbach, a brook which rises nearby and flows through the town. The newer parts of the town are built on the valley slopes.

== History ==
Wülfrath was one of the first settlements to be made in a clearing in the great Imperial forest of the early Middle Ages. The name means clearing of a man named Wolf and its date of origin is thought to be about 713. Around this has grown up the legend of a settler called Wolf who had been expelled from his clan and who is supposed to have made a clearing in the then luxuriant forest on the site of the present village centre.

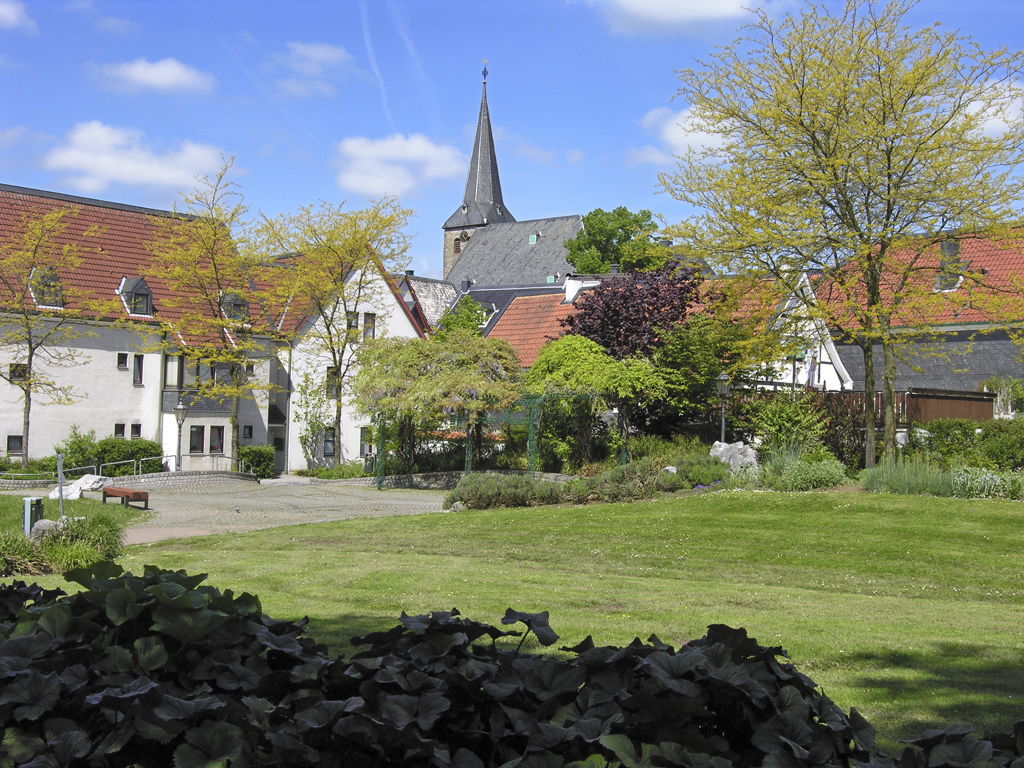
Wülfrath, Altstadt-Ansicht

In 875 the hundreds (Honnschaften) and present suburbs of Flandersbach (Flatmarasbeki, i.e., Flattmar's brook) and Rützkausen (Hrotsteninghuson, i.e., the houses of Hrotse's people) are named in a description of the places owing tithes to Werden Abbey on the Ruhr. In around 1100 the placename Wülfrath (Wolverothe) itself is at last mentioned in a document written in a monk's hand at the religious house at Kaiserswerth.

The boundaries are given in a deed of grant of the Emperor Henry VI dated 16 October 1165 as the courses of the Rhein, Ruhr and Düssel (Tussella) rivers. The eastern boundary was the old highway of the "Kölnische Straße" (strata colonensis), which ran from the bridge over the Ruhr at Werden via Velbert and Wülfrath along the Düssel towards Cologne. The centre of the mediaeval village was a demesne farm or manor (Mollmershof), which as part of the lordship of Hardenberg was sold to the Counts of Berg. Possession of this manor, to which an extensive group of scattered farms belonged, particularly in the hundreds of Erbach and Püttbach, also gave control of the advowson of the church, that is, the right to appoint the priest.

As early as 1265 the presence of a smith can be demonstrated from the tax and rent register. The estate of Puttbach in the hundred of the same name was in the possession of the Teutonic Knights in 1392. It became the administrative centre for the order's scattered properties, where every year the manorial court was held.

In 1578 the village was destroyed by a great fire, which also burnt the roof and tower of the church. To help mitigate the severe losses of the inhabitants, the local prince, Duke Johann Wilhelm IV of Jülich-Kleve-Berg, granted them in 1579 a charter of market rights, permitting his village and parish of Wulfrod four free markets a year. But exactly one hundred years after the first fire, another destroyed the entire village centre with more than 70 houses.

After the transfer of the Duchy of Berg to the French and the establishment of the Grand Duchy of Berg, out of the hundreds Erbach, Püttbach, Obschwarzbach, Niederschwarzbach (all previously Amt Mettmann), Flandersbach, Rützkausen (previously Amt Angermund) and Oberdüssel (previously in the lordship of Schöller) was formed in 1808 the municipality (mairie) of Wülfrath. In 1809 Obschwarzbach and Niederschwarzbach were added to Mettmann, in return for which, the hundred of Unterdüssel with the village of Düssel were given to Wülfrath.

After the wars of liberation the place came to Prussia, as part of the newly created Rhine Province. By an ordinance of 1827 Wülfrath was entitled to representation as part of the estate of towns in the Rhine Provincial Parliament. In 1856 it finally received full municipal rights with the passing of the town ordinance for the Rhine Province.

== Population ==
Historical population

| Year | Pop. | ±% p.a. |
|---|---|---|
| 1965 | 18,559 | — |
| 1970 | 19,464 | +0.96% |
| 1975 | 19,898 | +0.44% |
| 1980 | 20,916 | +1.00% |
| 1985 | 20,794 | −0.12% |
| 1990 | 21,987 | +1.12% |
| 1995 | 22,046 | +0.05% |

| Year | Pop. | ±% p.a. |
|---|---|---|
| 2000 | 22,531 | +0.44% |
| 2005 | 22,199 | −0.30% |
| 2010 | 21,299 | −0.82% |
| 2015 | 21,223 | −0.07% |
| 2020 | 21,003 | −0.21% |
| 2025 | 20,704 | −0.29% |

Source: Landesdatabank Nordrhein-Westfalen

== Church and other buildings ==
At the time of the first recorded reference in c. 1100, the first church building could already have been standing on the site of the present church square, a small early mediaeval church with a square choir. Since the 11th century a romanesque church stood there, which was extended and enlarged in the 15th century with Gothic additions. In the mid-15th century it was referred to as Saint Cornelius' church. The tower and north aisle with the wall separating it from the nave are romanesque, probably from the 12th century. The nave is Gothic, from the 14th century. The south aisle in Late Gothic style was completed, according to a capstone, in 1524. The church is surrounded by houses and shops built round it in a circle, forming a beautiful enclosed church square typical of the ancient Berg region.

The surrounding houses remain for the most part in their original state and are protected buildings, although others have been rebuilt. Each of them had (and still has) a name as well as a house number: Auf'm Keller (1678), Hamels (1678), Melanders (1678), Op der Ley (about 1600 - refurbished 1911), Auf'm Haus (1678), Großer Klaus (1686 - rebuilt 1964), Kleiner Klaus (1678), Scholle (1678), Hinter'm Turm (1678), Jostenhaus (refurbished about 1738), Hechtsteinhaus (1678), Op de Trapp (1678) and Leonhards (rebuilt 1955).

In 2001 a part of the historic Old Town yet again fell victim to the flames. During the night of 21 January 2001 a fire broke out which destroyed three of the old half-timbered houses. They had to be demolished, and have been replaced by modern buildings.

== Economics ==
By the mid-19th century, more than 100 companies and businesses had established themselves, most of which were largish cottage industries, principally weaving on looms. After 1850, the first large-scale businesses, aided by steam technology, were created. Despite the strong industrialization of that time, the village's agricultural character was not completely lost, but today only isolated agricultural enterprises exist.

Of particular significance was the arrival of quarrying in Wülfrath, with the establishment of the Rheinisch-Westfälische Kalkwerke Dornap in 1887, and the Rheinische Kalksteinwerke Wülfrath in 1903. Wülfrath now has the largest chalk and limestone quarries in Europe. These undertakings have been a decisive influence on the development of the town, and have remained the principal component of Wülfrath's industrial life until now.

There continued to be numerous home-based weaving enterprises, as well as businesses involved in finishing leather and many other small firms. A branch of the Ford works at Cologne was founded here, rising out of the coachwork company Josef Hebmueller Soehne, established 1889, and still extant as (Tedrive).

== Coat of arms ==
After 1840, the Wülfrath coat of arms, modelled on an old seal of the Lutheran Reformed municipality, was designed by the Düsseldorf heraldic and painter Wolfgang Pagenstecher. In 1938 the arms were again re-designed and officially recognized by the President of the Rhine Province. The arms, showing a shepherd in mediaeval costume fending off a wolf with his staff, symbolize the victory of good over evil and refer to the town's name, although not particularly to the settler Wolf.

== Schools ==
(External links here are in German):

- Grundschule Ellenbeek, 16 Tiegenhöfer Straße
- Grundschule Lindenschule, 26 Lindenstraße
- Grundschule Parkschule, 14 Parkstraße
- Hauptschule Wolverothe, 5 Schulstraße
- Theodor-Heuss-Realschule, 20 Bergstraße
- Städtisches Gymnasium, 63 Kastanienallee
- Schule für Lernbehinderte, 3 In den Eschen
- Volkshochschule Mettmann-Wülfrath, 189 Wilhelmstraße

== Politics ==
=== Mayors ===
In September 2020, Rainer Otto Ritsche was elected mayor of Wülfrath.

Previous mayors

- 1975–1984: Ulrich Schiller (CDU)
- 1984–1988: Helmut Kuhnert (SPD)
- 1988–1995: Alois Huning (CDU)
- 1995–2004: Ulrich Eilebrecht (independent)
- 2004–2009: Barbara Lorenz-Allendorff (independent)
- 2009–2020: Claudia Panke (independent)
- 2020–2025: Rainer Otto Ritsche (independent)
- since 2025: Sebastian Schorn (CDU)

=== City council ===
The city council has 46 seats. The elections in 2020 showed the following results:

| Party | Seats |
|---|---|
| CDU | 17 |
| SPD | 9 |
| Voters association | 8 |
| Green | 8 |
| FDP | 2 |
| Left | 2 |

=== Twinned towns ===
- Ware, England, United Kingdom (since 1971)
- Bondues, Nord-Pas-De-Calais, France (since 2003)
- Ames, Iowa, United States (since 1985)

=== Sponsorship ===
- Since 24 October 2000, the town has sponsored the Army Music Corps 7 of the Bundeswehr, based in Düsseldorf

== Sites of interest ==
=== Museums ===
- Niederbergisches Museum, Bergstrasse 22-24
- Zeittunnel Wülfrath, Hammerstein 5

=== Others ===
- Historical church square
- Düsseler Tor

== Events ==
- Weekly market, every Saturday from 7:00 to 12:00 (CET)
- Annual summer fair of the allotments at Erbacher Berg
- Annual city celebration, the Kartoffelfest (Potato Fair), in September
- Annual Christmas market, known as Duke William's Market, at the end of November.

== Notable people ==
Sons and daughters:

- Wolfgang Kuck (born 1967), volleyball player
- Werner Weber (1904–1976), jurist

Persons with relationship to the city:

- Friedensreich Hundertwasser (1928–2000), artist; Designed the dome at the Kindergarten Düsseler Tor
- Gottfried Daniel Krummacher (1774–1837), theologian, 1801–1816 Pastor in Wülfrath
