= Jennifer Janiska =

German volleyball player (born 1994)

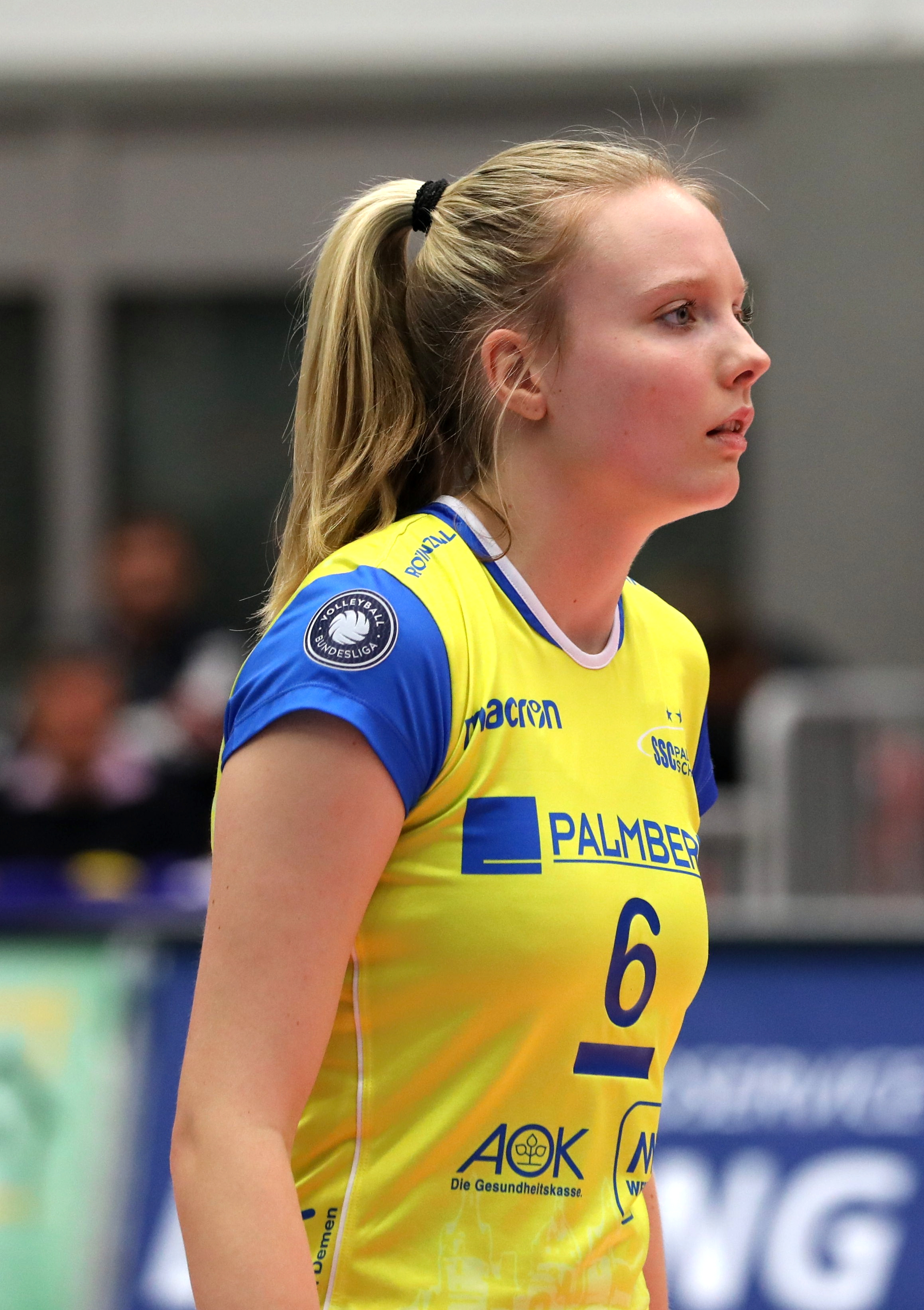

Personal information
- Nationality: German
- Born: 5 April 1994 (age 32); Nordhorn, Germany
- Height: 1.86 m (6 ft 1 in)
- Weight: 64 kg (141 lb)
- Spike: 298 cm (117 in)
- Block: 288 cm (113 in)

Volleyball information
- Position: Outside hitter
- Current club: LOVB Madison
- Number: 6

Career
Years	Teams
2009-2010	SCU Emlichheim
2010-2013	VCO Berlin
2013-2014	Rote Raben Vilsbiburg
2014-2019	SSC Palmberg Schwerin
2019-2020	Imoco Volley Conegliano
2020-2024	Dresdner SC 1898
2024-	LOVB Madison

National team
2013–2022	Germany
Honours
Volleyball
European Championships
Silver medal – second place	2013 Germany/ Switzerland

Jennifer Janiska (5 April 1994 in Nordhorn née Jennifer Geerties) is a German professional volleyball player. She was the captain of the Germany women's national volleyball team who won the silver medal at the 2013 European Championships with the national team. At club level, Janiska won the world title with Imoco Volley Conegliano in 2019. She currently plays in the United States of for LOVB Madison of the LOVB Pro league.

== Awards ==
=== Clubs ===
- 2019 Club World Championship - Champion, with Imoco Volley Cogneliano
- 2017–18 CEV Cup - Third place, with SSC Palmberg Schwerin
- 2017–18 CEV Cup - Third place, with SSC Palmberg Schwerin
- 2014–15 Challenge Cup - Third place, with SSC Palmberg Schwerin
- 2016–17 Challenge Cup - Third place, with SSC Palmberg Schwerin

Awards
Preceded by Louisa Lippmann	German Volleyball Player of the Year; 2022	Succeeded by incumbent
