= Judith Flemig =

German volleyball player (born 1979)

Personal information
- Nationality: German
- Born: 22 May 1979 (age 47)
- Height: 1.88 m (6 ft 2 in)
- Weight: 63 kg (139 lb)

National team
2000	Germany

Judith Flemig-Pelzer (born 22 May 1979) is a German former volleyball player. She was part of the Germany women's national volleyball team. In 1999 she was the German Volleyball Player of the Year.

She competed with the national team at the 2000 Summer Olympics in Sydney, Australia, finishing 6th. Her younger sister Ruth Kolokotronis also played the sport at a high level.

== See also ==
- Germany at the 2000 Summer Olympics

Awards
Preceded by Ulrike Schmidt	German Volleyball Player of the Year; 1999	Succeeded by Angelina Grün
