= Holger Kleinbub =

German volleyball player (born 1971)

Personal information
- Full name: Holger Kleinbub
- Nationality: German
- Born: 28 August 1971 (age 55); Frankfurt am Main, Hesse, West Germany

Holger Kleinbub (born 28 August 1971 in Frankfurt am Main, Hesse) is a retired volleyball player from Germany, who played for the Men's National Team in the 1990s and the 2000s. Playing as a wing-spiker he earned a total number of 130 caps for the national squad.

Awards
| Preceded by (Germany) Stefan Hübner | German Volleyball Player of the Year; 2000 | Succeeded by (Germany) Stefan Hübner |
