= Maren Brinker =

German volleyball player (born 1986)

Maren Fromm
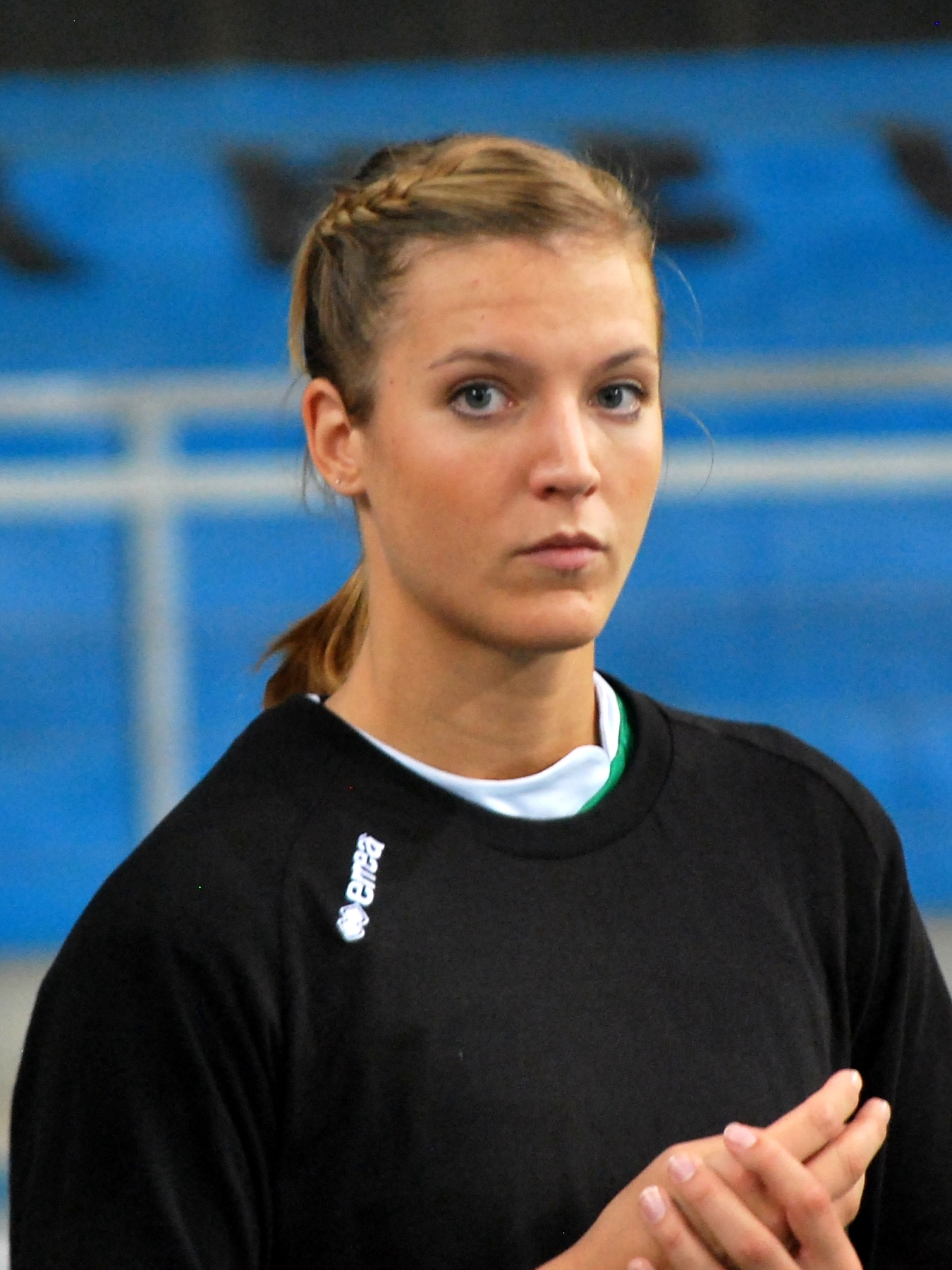
- 2013

Personal information
- Nationality: German
- Born: Maren Brinker; 10 July 1986 (age 40); Wilhelmshaven, West Germany
- Height: 1.84 m (6 ft 0 in)
- Weight: 68 kg (150 lb)
- Spike: 303 cm (119 in)
- Block: 295 cm (116 in)

Volleyball information
- Position: Outside hitter
- Current team: Çanakkale Belediyespor
- Number: 4

Career
| Years | Teams |
|---|---|
| 2002–2005; 2005; 2005–2006; 2006–2009; 2009–2010; 2010–2011; 2011–2012; 2012–2013; 2013–2014; 2014–2016; 2016; 2016–2017; 2017– | Oldenburger Turnerbund; VC Olympia Berlin; USC Braunschweig; Bayer 04 Leverkusen; USC Münster; Smart Allianz Stuttgart; Scavolini Pesaro; Futura Volley Busto Arsizio; Impel Wrocław; Metalleghe Sanitars Montichiari; Trabzon İdmanocağı; Schweriner SC; Çanakkale Belediyespor |

National team
| 2007– | Germany |
Medal record
Women's volleyball
Representing Germany
European Championship
| Silver medal – second place | 2011 Italy/Serbia | Team |
| Silver medal – second place | 2013 Germany | Team |
Grand Prix
| Bronze medal – third place | 2009 Tokyo | Team |
Montreux Volley Masters
| Gold medal – first place | 2014 Switzerland | Team |
| Silver medal – second place | 2017 Switzerland | Team |
- Last updated: 31 December 2017

Maren Fromm (née Brinker; born 10 July 1986) is a retired German volleyball player, a member of Germany women's national volleyball team.

== Personal life ==
On 24 June 2017 she married Christian Fromm, German national team volleyball player.

== Career ==
Brinker represented her country in the FIVB World Grand Prix 2009. She signed for the Italian club Unendo Yamamay Busto Arsizio in June 2012 and won the 2012 Italian Supercup with this club.

In the 2012–13 CEV Women's Champions League Brinker won the bronze medal with her club after falling to Rabita Baku in the semifinals, but defeating Galatasaray Daikin to claim the podium finish. She also won the Best Server award of the tournament.

2014 in the FIVB Championships in Italy, she carried the German team into the second round where they fell one point short of reaching the quarter-finals (final 9th place).

After 11 years in the national team, she announced her retirement in the 2018 FIVB Women's World Championship

== Clubs ==
| Club | From | To |
|---|---|---|
| Germany Oldenburger Turnerbund | 2002-2003 | 2004-2005 |
| Germany VC Olympia Berlin | 2005-2005 | 2005-2005 |
| Germany USC Braunschweig | 2005-2006 | 2005-2006 |
| Germany TSV Bayer 04 Leverkusen | 2006-2007 | 2008-2009 |
| Germany USC Münster | 2009-2010 | 2009-2010 |
| Germany VC Stuttgart | 2010-2011 | 2010-2011 |
| Italy Robursport Volley Pesaro | 2011-2012 | 2011-2012 |
| Italy Futura Volley Busto Arsizio | 2012-2013 | 2012-2013 |
| Poland Impel Wrocław | 2013-2014 | 2013-2014 |
| Italy Promoball Flero | 2014-2015 | 2015-2016 |
| Turkey İdmanocağı Spor Kulübü | Aug 2016 | Nov 2016 |
| Germany Schweriner SC | 2016-2017 | 2016-2017 |
| Turkey Çanakkale Belediye | 2017-2018 | 2017-2018 |

== Awards ==
=== Individuals ===
- 2012–13 CEV Champions League "Best Server"
- 2015 German Volleyball Player of the Year
- 2016 German Volleyball Player of the Year

=== Clubs ===
- 2012 Italian Supercup – Champion, with Unendo Yamamay Busto Arsizio
- 2012–13 CEV Champions League – Bronze medal, with Unendo Busto

Awards
| Preceded by Margareta Kozuch | German Volleyball Player of the Year; 2016, 2017 | Succeeded by Louisa Lippmann |
