= Constance Radfan =

German volleyball player (born 1969)

Personal information
- Nationality: German
- Born: 24 October 1969 (age 57)
- Hometown: Sassnitz
- Height: 184 cm (6 ft 0 in)

Volleyball information
- Number: 4 (national team)

Career
Years	Teams
1994	CJD Berlino

National team
1994–1996	Germany

Constance Radfan (born 24 October 1969) is a German former volleyball player.

Radfan was part of the Germany women's national volleyball team and competed at the 1996 Summer Olympics in Atlanta, Georgia. On club level she played with CJD Berlino.

Her elder sister Ariane also played the sport, taking part in the 1988 Summer Olympics for East Germany.

== Clubs ==
- CJD Berlino (1994)
