= Christiane Fürst =

German volleyball player

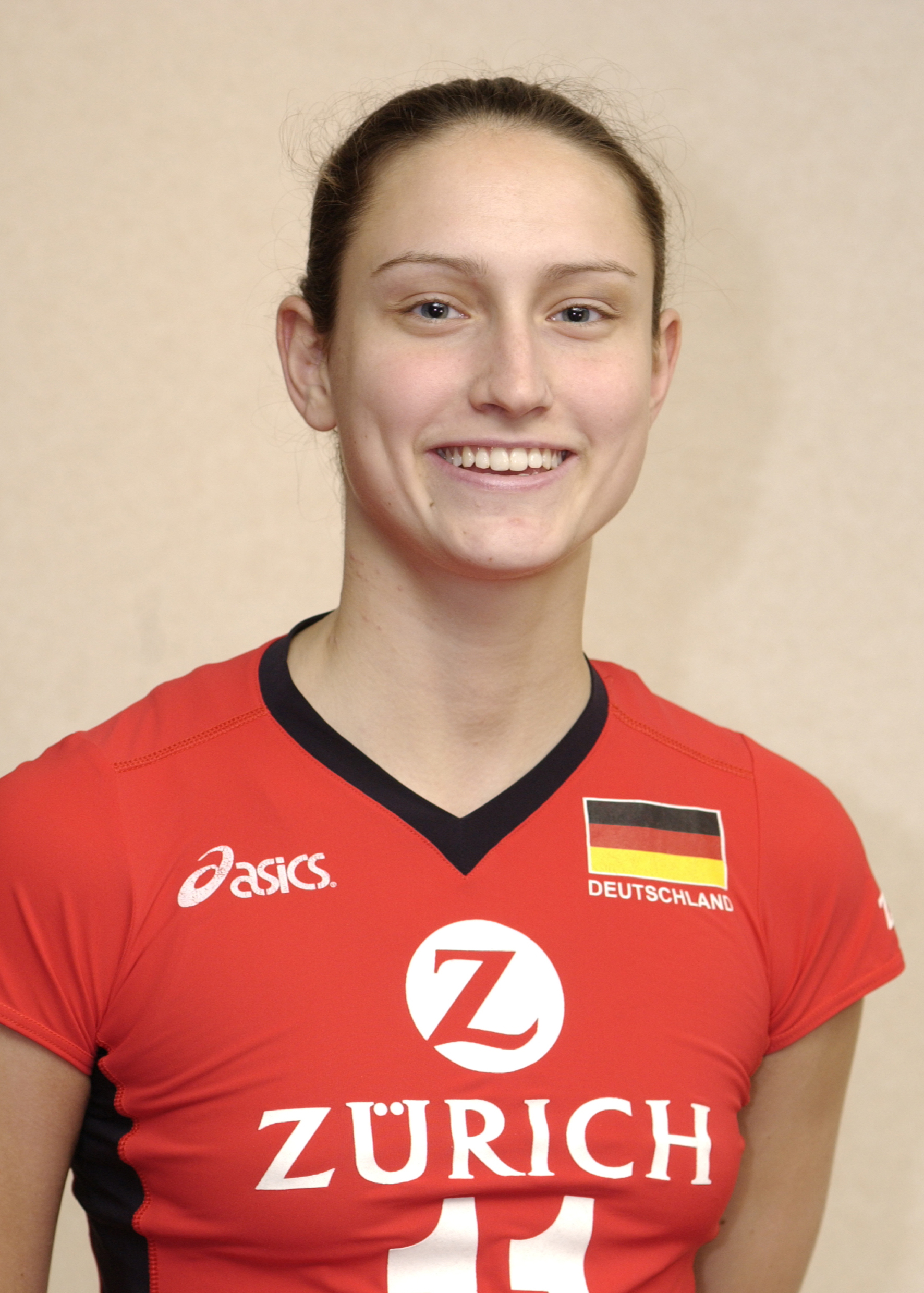

Personal information
- Nickname: Chris
- Born: 29 March 1985 (age 41); Dresden, German Democratic Republic
- Height: 1.92 m (6 ft 4 in)
- Weight: 76 kg (168 lb)
- Spike: 323 cm (127 in)
- Block: 307 cm (121 in)

Volleyball information
- Position: Middle Blocker

National team
| 2003–2015 | Germany |
Medal record
Women's volleyball
Representing Germany
European Championship
| Silver medal – second place | 2011 Italy-Serbia | Team |
| Silver medal – second place | 2013 Germany | Team |
| Bronze medal – third place | 2003 Ankara | Team |
FIVB World Grand Prix
| Bronze medal – third place | 2009 Tokyo | Team |
- Last updated: 13 October 2013

Christiane Fürst (born 29 March 1985) is a German retired volleyball player.

== Career ==
She won a bronze medal at the 2003 Women's European Volleyball Championship.

Fürst was named Best Blocker at the 2006 and 2010 World Championships. She won the 2007–08 CEV Cup with the Italian team Scavolini Pesaro, and was named "Best Spiker". She won the bronze medal at the 2010–11 CEV Champions League with Fenerbahçe Acıbadem. As part of the Vakıfbank Spor Kulübü, she won CEV Women's Champions League in 2012–2013 season.

At the 2013 European Championship, she took the silver medal with her National Team.

Fürst won the gold medal at the 2013 Club World Championship and the Best Middle Blocker award, playing with Vakıfbank Istanbul.

== Clubs ==
- (Germany) Dresdner SC (1995–2007)
- (Italy) Scavolini Pesaro (2007–2009)
- (Italy) Foppapedretti Bergamo (2009–2010)
- (Turkey) Fenerbahçe Acıbadem (2010–2011)
- (Turkey) VakıfBank Türk Telekom (2011–2014)
- (Turkey) Eczacıbaşı VitrA (2014–2016)
- (Japan) Denso Airybees (2016–2018)

== Awards ==
=== Individuals ===
- 2006 World Championship "Best Blocker"
- 2007 Montreux Volley Masters "Best Blocker"
- 2007–08 CEV Cup Final Four "Best Spiker"
- 2009 European Championships "Best Blocker"
- 2009 German Volleyball Player of the Year
- 2009/10 Italian League "Best Server"
- 2009-10 Italian League "Best Blocker"
- 2010 World Championship "Best Blocker"
- 2011 Montreux Volley Masters "Best Scorer"
- 2011 Montreux Volley Masters "Best Blocker"
- 2011 European Championship "Best Blocker"
- 2011 World Cup "Best Blocker"
- 2013 European Championship "Best Blocker"
- 2013 FIVB Women's Club World Championship "Best Middle Blocker"
- 2014–15 CEV Champions League "Fair Play Award"

=== National team ===
- 2003 European Championship — Bronze Medal
- 2011 European Championship — Silver Medal
- 2013 European Championship — Silver Medal

=== Clubs ===
- 1998–99 German League Championship – Champion, with Dresdner SC
- 1998–99 German Cup – Champion, with Dresdner SC
- 2001–2002 German Cup – Champion, with Dresdner SC
- 2006–07 German League Championship – Champion, with Dresdner SC
- 2007–08 Italian Championship – Champion, with Scavolini Pesaro
- 2007–08 CEV Cup – Champion, with Scavolini Pesaro
- 2008–09 Italian Cup – Champion, with Scavolini Pesaro
- 2008–09 Italian Supercup – Champion, with Scavolini Pesaro
- 2008–09 Italian Championship – Champion, with Scavolini Pesaro
- 2009/10 CEV Champions League – Champion, with Volley Bergamo
- 2010 FIVB World Club Championship – Champion, with Fenerbahçe Acıbadem
- 2010 Turkish Super Cup – Champion, with Fenerbahçe Acıbadem
- 2010–11 CEV Champions League – Bronze medal, with Fenerbahçe Acıbadem
- 2010–11 Turkish League – Champion, with Fenerbahçe Acıbadem
- 2011 FIVB Women's Club World Championship – Runner-Up, with VakıfBank Türk Telekom
- 2011-12 Turkish League – Runner-Up, with Vakıfbank Spor Kulübü
- 2012-13 Turkish Cup – Champion, with Vakıfbank Spor Kulübü
- 2012–13 CEV Champions League – Champion, with Vakıfbank Spor Kulübü
- 2012-13 Turkish League – Champion, with Vakıfbank Spor Kulübü
- 2013 Club World Championship - Champion, with Vakıfbank Istanbul
- 2014–15 CEV Champions League - Champion, with Eczacıbaşı VitrA
- 2015 Club World Championship - Champion, with Eczacıbaşı VitrA

Awards
| Preceded by (United States) Danielle Scott | Best Blocker of FIVB World Championship; 2006; 2010 | Succeeded by Not awarded |
| Preceded by Not awarded | Best Middle Blocker of FIVB Club World Championship; 2013 ex aequo (Brazil) Ana Carolina da Silva | Succeeded by (Brazil) Thaísa Menezes (Russia) Regina Moroz |
| Preceded by Angelina Grün | German Volleyball Player of the Year; 2009 | Succeeded by Margareta Kozuch |
