= Ines Pianka =

German volleyball player (born 1969)

Personal information
- Born: 15 March 1969 (age 57); Bergen auf Rügen, East Germany
- Height: 180 cm (5 ft 11 in)

Volleyball information
- Position: Setter
- Number: 10 (national team)

Career
Years	Teams
1994	VC Schwerte

National team
1989; 1991-1996	East Germany; Germany
Honours
Women's volleyball
Representing East Germany
European Championship
Silver medal – second place	1989 West Germany	Indoor
Representing Germany
European Championship
Bronze medal – third place	1991 Italy	Indoor

Ines Pianka (born 15 March 1969) is a German former volleyball and beach volleyball player. She was the captain of the German women's national volleyball team at the 1996 Summer Olympics. On club level, she played with VC Schwerte.

In 1991 and 1995, Pianka became the German Volleyball Player of the Year.

== Beach volleyball ==
In beach volleyball, Pianka competed at the 1999 European Beach Volleyball Championships and 2000 European Beach Volleyball Championships with Stephanie Pohl. At the 2005 Beach Volleyball World Championships, she competed with Jana Vollmer.

== Clubs ==
- VC Schwerte (1994)

Awards
Preceded by Ariane Radfan / Karen Baumeister	German Volleyball Player of the Year; 1991	Succeeded by Susanne Lahme

Awards
Preceded by Grit Naumann	German Volleyball Player of the Year; 1995	Succeeded by Sylvia Roll
