= Terry Place-Brandel =

German volleyball player (born 1957)

Personal information
- Nationality: German
- Born: 15 September 1957 (age 67); Hawthorne, California, United States

Sport
- Sport: Volleyball

Terry Place-Brandel (born 15 September 1957) is a German volleyball player. She competed in the women's tournament at the 1984 Summer Olympics.

Awards
Preceded by Gabi Lorenz	German Volleyball Player of the Year; 1983	Succeeded by Marina Staden
