= Gudrun Witte =

German volleyball player (born 1962)

Personal information
- Full name: Gudrun Witte (-Burschik)
- Nationality: German
- Born: 4 January 1962 (age 63); Munich, West Germany (now Germany)
- Height: 181 cm (5 ft 11 in)

Sport
- Sport: Volleyball

Gudrun Witte (born 4 January 1962) is a German former volleyball player. She competed in the women's tournament at the 1984 Summer Olympics.

Awards
Preceded by Renate Riek	German Volleyball Player of the Year; 1988	Succeeded by Gudula Staub
