= Gudi Staub =

German beach volleyball player (born 1968)

Personal information
- Full name: Gudula Staub (-Krause)
- Nickname: Gudi
- Nationality: German
- Born: 31 December 1968 (age 56); Saarlouis, West Germany
- Height: 184 cm (6 ft 0 in)

Sport
- Sport: Beach volleyball

Gudi Staub (born 31 December 1968) is a German former beach volleyball player. She competed in the women's tournament at the 2000 Summer Olympics.

Awards
Preceded by Gudrun Witte	German Volleyball Player of the Year; 1989	Succeeded by Ariane Radfan / Karen Baumeister
