= Angelina Grün =

German volleyball player

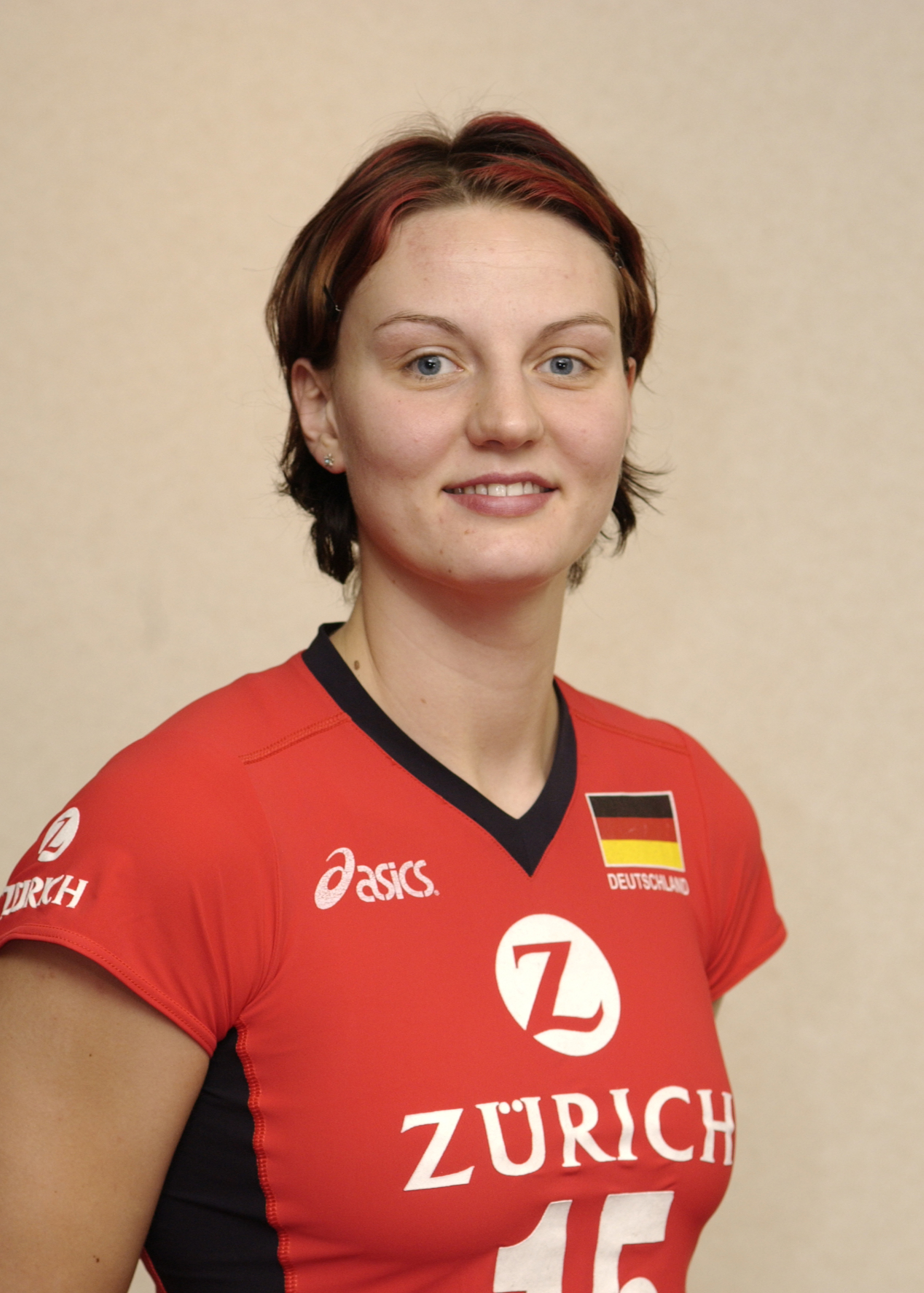
- Angelina Grün

Personal information
- Full name: Angelina Grün
- Nickname: Angelina Gruen
- Nationality: German
- Born: 2 December 1979 (age 46); Dushanbe, Tajik SSR, Soviet Union (now Tajikistan)
- Hometown: Cologne
- Height: 1.85 m (6 ft 1 in)
- Weight: 74 kg (163 lb)
- Spike: 309 cm (122 in)
- Block: 287 cm (113 in)

Volleyball information
- Position: Wing Spiker

National team
1997–2006, 2011–2017	Germany
Honours
Women's volleyball
Representing Germany
FIVB Grand Prix
Bronze medal – third place	2002 Hong Kong	Team competition
European Championships
Silver medal – second place	2011 Italy-Serbia	Team
Bronze medal – third place	2003 Ankara	Team competition
- Last updated: November 2017

Angelina Grün (born 2 December 1979) is a German former volleyball player, who was a member of the German Women's Team at the 2000 Summer Olympics in Sydney, Australia. Grün also competed at the 2004 Summer Olympics in Athens, Greece.

== Career ==
A ninth-time consecutive German Volleyball Player of the Year (2000–2008), she played in Turkey for VakıfBank Güneş Sigorta Istanbul for the 2008–2009 season.

After winning the European Champions League with the Italian team Foppapedretti Bergamo in 2007 for a second time after 2005, Grün was honored "Most Valuable Player" of the tournament.

Starting her career in Münster, Germany, where she won the national title in 1997 and the Cup in 2000, she won several Italian Cups (2002, 2006), Championships (2004, 2006) and the CEV Cup (2002 and 2004).

She was awarded Volleyball-Award 2010, by the Germany Volleyball Association for her services to the sport. In April 2010 she decided to retire from indoor volleyball and switched to beach volleyball, partnering Rieke Brink-Abeler playing the 2010 and 2011 Swatch FIVB World Tour.

But she returned to indoor volleyball and played with her national team in the 2011 FIVB World Cup and later played with the Russian club Dinamo Moscow winning the 2011 Russian Cup where she was the Most Valuable Player and the 2011–12 Russian Championship silver medal, being also elected the best player in the Russian league that season.

Grün won the silver medal and the Best Server award in the 2012 FIVB Club World Championship, playing with the Azerbaijani club Rabita Baku.

== Personal life ==
She has been married to volleyball player Stefan Hübner since 2012. The couple has two sons, Jakob (born 2014) and Benjamin (born 2017).

== Clubs ==
- (Germany) VC Essen Borbeck (1990–1996)
- (Germany) USC Münster (1996–2001)
- (Italy) Volley Modena (2001–2003)
- (Italy) Foppapedretti Bergamo (2003–2008)
- (Turkey) VakıfBank Güneş Sigorta Istanbul (2008–2009)
- (Germany) Alemannia Aachen (2011)
- (Russia) Dinamo Moscow (2011–2012)
- (Azerbaijan) Rabita Baku (2012–2013)
- (Germany) SG Marmagen-Nettersheim (2014–2016)

== Awards ==
=== Individuals ===
- 2006-07 Champions League "Most Valuable Player"
- 2000 to 2008 Germany "Volleyball Player of the Year"
- 2007–08 Italian League "Best Server"
- 2011 European Championship "Best Receiver"
- 2011 Russian Cup "Most Valuable Player"
- 2011–12 Russia Super League "Best Player"
- 2012 FIVB Women's Club World Championship "Best Server"

=== Clubs ===
- 1997 German Championship – Champion, with USC Münster
- 2002 CEV Cup – Champion, with Volley Modena
- 2003 Italian Supercup – Champion, with Volley Modena
- 2004 CEV Cup – Champion, with Foppapedretti Bergamo
- 2004 Italian Championship Champion, with Foppapedretti Bergamo
- 2005 Champions League – Champion, with Foppapedretti Bergamo
- 2004 Italian Championship Champion, with Foppapedretti Bergamo
- 2006 Italian Cup – Champion, with Foppapedretti Bergamo
- 2006 Italian Championship Champion, with Foppapedretti Bergamo
- 2007 Champions League – Champion, with Foppapedretti Bergamo
- 2008 Italian Cup – Champion, with Foppapedretti Bergamo
- 2011 Russian Cup – Champion, with Dinamo Moscow
- 2011–12 Russian Championship – Runner-Up, with Dinamo Moscow
- 2012 FIVB Club World Championship – Runner-Up, with Rabita Baku
- 2012–13 CEV Champions League – Runner-Up, with Rabita Baku

Awards
Preceded by Judith Flemig	German Volleyball Player of the Year; 2000–2008	Succeeded by Christiane Fürst
Preceded by (Turkey) Bahar Toksoy	Best Server of FIVB Club World Championship; 2012	Succeeded by Not awarded
