= Louisa Lippmann =

German volleyball player (born 1994)

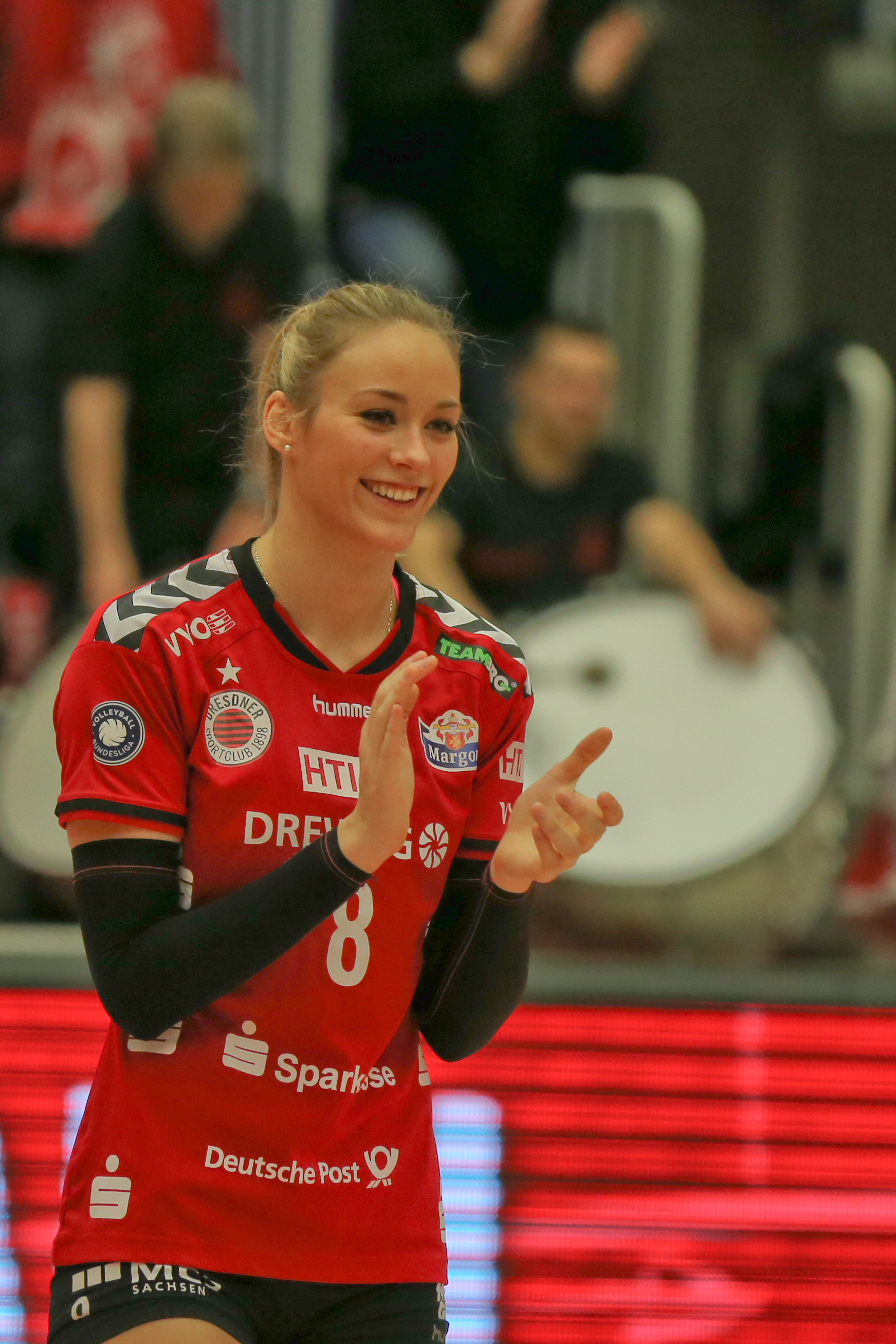
- Lippmann in 2016

Personal information
- Full name: Louisa-Christin Lippmann
- Nickname: Loui, Lippi
- Nationality: German
- Born: 23 September 1994 (age 32); Herford, Germany
- Height: 1.91 m (6 ft 3 in)
- Weight: 78 kg (172 lb)
- Spike: 319 cm (126 in)
- Block: 312 cm (123 in)

Volleyball information
- Position: Outside hitter / Opposite
- Current club: Savino del bene scandicci
- Number: 11

Career
Years	Teams
–	TG Herford
–2010	SV Bielefeld
2010–2014	USC Münster
2014–2016	Dresdner SC
2016–2018	Schweriner SC
2018–2019	Il Bisonte Firenze
2019–2020	Schweriner SC
2021–	Lokomotiv Kaliningrad

National team
2013–	Germany
Honours
Women's beach volleyball
Representing Germany
European Championships
Bronze medal – third place	2023 Vienna	Beach
Montreux Volley Masters
Silver medal – second place	2017 Switzerland	Team
- Last updated: 15 October 2018

Louisa-Christin Lippmann (born 23 September 1994) is a German volleyball player. She plays as an outside hitter or opposite and has over 100 appearances for the Germany women's national volleyball team. At club level, she played for Lokomotiv Kaliningrad. Lippmann played in many international competitions (FIVB World Championships, FIVB World Grand Prix, FIVB Nations League, European Championships, European Leagues, European Games) and won the German league, cup and supercup with the clubs she played for. She transitioned 2022 to beach volleyball and represented Germany at the 2024 Summer Olympics partnering with former gold medallist Laura Ludwig.

== Career ==
=== Club ===
Her first sport was athletics before she tried volleyball at TG Herford. She soon moved to SV Bielefeld and played in the youth teams until 2010 when she moved to USC Münster, where she progressed from the second league to the Bundesliga. In 2014 she went to Dresdner SC, winning the Bundesliga twice and the German Cup once. In 2016, she moved to Schweriner SC with whom she won another two Bundesliga titles, one German Super Cup and a German Cup runners-up place.

While playing for Dresdner SC and Schweriner SC, she also competed in European competitions (twice with each team). She reached the playoff stage of both 2014–15 CEV Women's Champions League and 2015–16 CEV Women's Champions League with Dresden and helped Schwerin reach two semifinals, in the 2016–17 CEV Women's Challenge Cup and in the 2017–18 Women's CEV Cup.

She was the Bundesliga most valuable player twice (2016–17 and 2017–18) and was named the female German volleyball player of the year in 2017.

Ahead of the 2018–19 season, she signed with Italian club Il Bisonte Firenze.

=== National team ===
Lippmann has been part of the Germany women's national volleyball team since 2013, but a shoulder injury prevented her from making her debut for a year, when she finally played in the 2014 Montreux Volley Masters, Germany won the tournament. Later that year, she helped Germany finish second at the 2014 Women's European Volleyball League and ninth place at the 2014 FIVB Volleyball Women's World Championship. She was part of the German runners-up team at the 2017 Montreux Volley Masters, and has played in European Championships, European League, European Games, FIVB World Grand Prix and FIVB Nations League.

=== Beach volleyball ===
She represented Germany at the 2024 Summer Olympics partnering with former gold medallist Laura Ludwig.

== Clubs ==
- (Germany) TG Herford
- (Germany) Post Telekom Bielefeld ( –2010)
- (Germany) USC Münster (2010–2014)
- (Germany) Dresdner SC (2014–2016)
- (Germany) SSC Palmberg Schwerin (2016–2018)
- (Italy) Il Bisonte Firenze (2018–2019)
- (China) Shanghai women's volleyball team (2019–2020)
- (Germany) SSC Palmberg Schwerin (2019–2020)
- (China) Shanghai women's volleyball team (2020–2021)
- (Russia) Lokomotiv Kaliningrad (2021)

== Awards ==
=== Individual ===
- 2016–17 German League Most Valuable Player
- 2017 German Volleyball Player of the Year
- 2017–18 German League Most Valuable Player
- 2020 CEV Tokyo qualification "Opposite Spiker"

=== National team ===
==== Senior ====
- 2014 Montreux Volley Masters — Gold medal
- 2014 Women's European Volleyball League — Silver medal
- 2017 Montreux Volley Masters — Silver medal

=== National championships ===
- 2014–15 German Championship — Gold medal (with Dresdner SC)
- 2015–16 German Cup — Gold medal (with Dresdner SC)
- 2015–16 German Championship — Gold medal (with Dresdner SC)
- 2016–17 German Cup — Silver medal (with Schweriner SC)
- 2016–17 German Championship — Gold medal (with Schweriner SC)
- 2017 German Super Cup — Gold medal (with Schweriner SC)
- 2017–18 German Championship — Gold medal (with Schweriner SC)
- 2020–21 Russian Championship – Gold medal (with Lokomotiv Kaliningrad)

Awards
Preceded by Maren Brinker	German Volleyball Player of the Year; 2017–2021	Succeeded by Jennifer Janiska
