= Sylvia Roll =

German volleyball player (born 1973)

Personal information
- Nationality: German
- Born: 29 May 1973 (age 53); Schwerin, East Germany
- Height: 1.8 m (5 ft 11 in)
- Weight: 72 kg (159 lb)

National team
2000	Germany

Sylvia Roll (born 29 May 1973) is a German former volleyball player. She was part of the Germany women's national volleyball team. In 1996 and 1997 she became the German Volleyball Player of the Year.

She competed with the national team at the 2000 Summer Olympics in Sydney, Australia, finishing 6th. She played at the 2002 FIVB Volleyball Women's World Championship in Germany. On club level she played with Vini Monte Schiavo Jesi.

== See also ==
- Germany at the 2000 Summer Olympics

Awards
Preceded by Ines Pianka	German Volleyball Player of the Year; 1996, 1997	Succeeded by Ulrike Schmidt
