= Margareta Kozuch =

German volleyball player (born 1986)

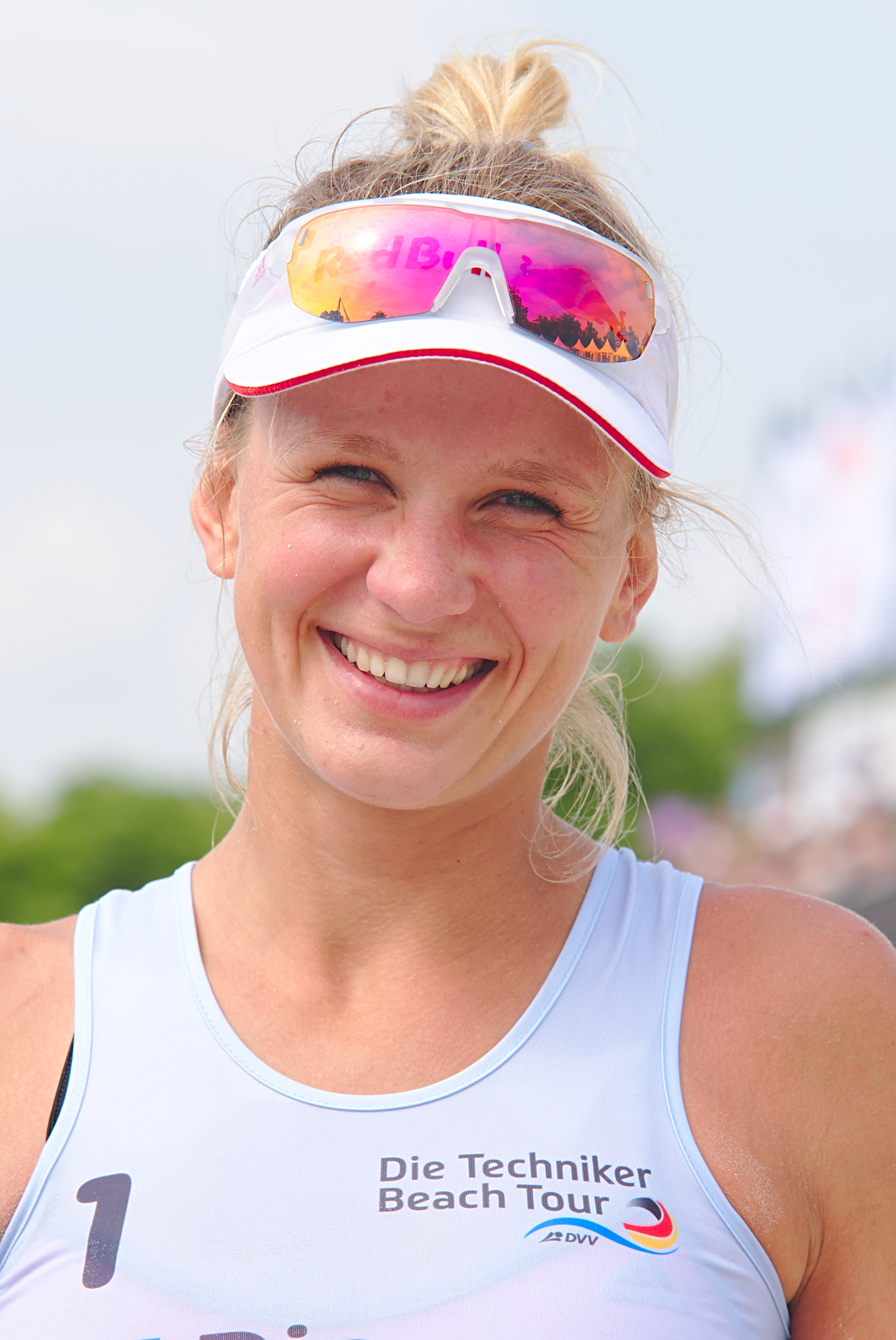
- Kozuch in 2018

Personal information
- Full name: Margareta Anna Kozuch
- Nationality: German
- Born: 30 October 1986 (age 40); Hamburg, West Germany
- Hometown: Hamburg, Germany
- Height: 1.90 m (6 ft 3 in)
- Weight: 74 kg (163 lb)
- Spike: 309 cm (122 in)
- Block: 297 cm (117 in)

Volleyball information
- Position: Wing Spiker
- Current club: (Italy) Pomi Casalmaggiore
- Number: 14

Career
Years	Teams
1999–02; 2002–03; 2003–06; 2006–07; 2007–08; 2008–10	TuS Berne; CVJM Hamburg; TV Fischbek Hamburg; NA Hamburg; Unicom Starker Kerakoll Sassuolo; Asystel Volley Novara

National team
2005 – 2015	Germany
Medal record
Women's volleyball
Representing Germany
FIVB World Grand Prix
Bronze medal – third place	2009 Tokyo	Team
European Championships
Silver medal – second place	2011 Italy-Serbia	Team
Silver medal – second place	2013 Germany-Switzerland	Team
- Last updated: October 2011

Margareta Anna "Maggie" Kozuch (Polish: Małgorzata Kożuch; born 30 October 1986) is a German volleyball player who played for Atom Trefl Sopot, and previously played as a wing-spiker for TuS Berne Hamburg, CVMJ Hamburg, TV Fischbek (who changed their name to NA Hamburg), and Unicom Starker Kerakoll Sassuolo.

She was Hamburg's sportswoman of the year in 2005. She represented the German women's national volleyball team in the FIVB World Grand Prix 2009.

She was German sportswoman of the year in 2010. She is of Polish origin.

== Beach volleyball career ==
After a successful career playing indoor volleyball, Kozuch switched to beach volleyball in 2017. She teamed up with Olympics veteran, Laura Ludwig, winning the World Tour Finals in 2019.

In 2021, Ludwig and Kozuch represented Germany at the 2020 Summer Olympics in Tokyo that had been delayed due to the worldwide COVID-19 pandemic. The pair reached the quarter finals losing to the Americans April Ross and Alix Klineman.

== Personal life ==
Kozuch is married to Italian basketball player Nicolò Gorla. The couple have a son.

== Clubs ==
- (Germany) TuS Berne (1999–2002)
- (Germany) CVJM Hamburg (2002–2003)
- (Germany) TV Fischbek Hamburg (2003–2006)
- (Germany) NA Hamburg (2006–2007)
- (Italy) Unicom Starker Kerakoll Sassuolo (2007–2008)
- (Italy) Asystel Volley Novara (2008–2010)
- (Russia) Zarechie Odintsovo (2010–2011)
- (Poland) Atom Trefl Sopot (2011–2012)
- (Italy) Yamamay Busto Arsizio (2012–2013)
- (Azerbaijan) Azerrail Baku (2013–2014)
- (China) Shanghai (2014–2015)
- (Italy) Pomi Casalmaggiore (2015–2016)

== Awards ==
=== Individuals ===
- 2009 European Championships "Best Scorer"
- 2010 German Volleyball Player of the Year
- 2011 European Championship "Best Spiker"
- 2011 German Volleyball Player of the Year
- 2012 German Volleyball Player of the Year
- 2013 Women's European Volleyball League "Best Spiker"
- 2013 Women's European Volleyball League "Best Scorer"
- 2013 German Volleyball Player of the Year
- 2014 German Volleyball Player of the Year

=== Clubs ===
- 2009 CEV Cup – Champion, with Asystel Volley Novara
- 2012–13 CEV Champions League – Bronze medal, with Yamamay Busto Arsizio
- 2015-16 CEV Champions League - Gold medal, with Pomi Casalmaggiore

Awards
Preceded by Christiane Fürst	German Volleyball Player of the Year; 2010–2014	Succeeded by Maren Brinker
