= Björn Andrae =

German volleyball player (born 1981)

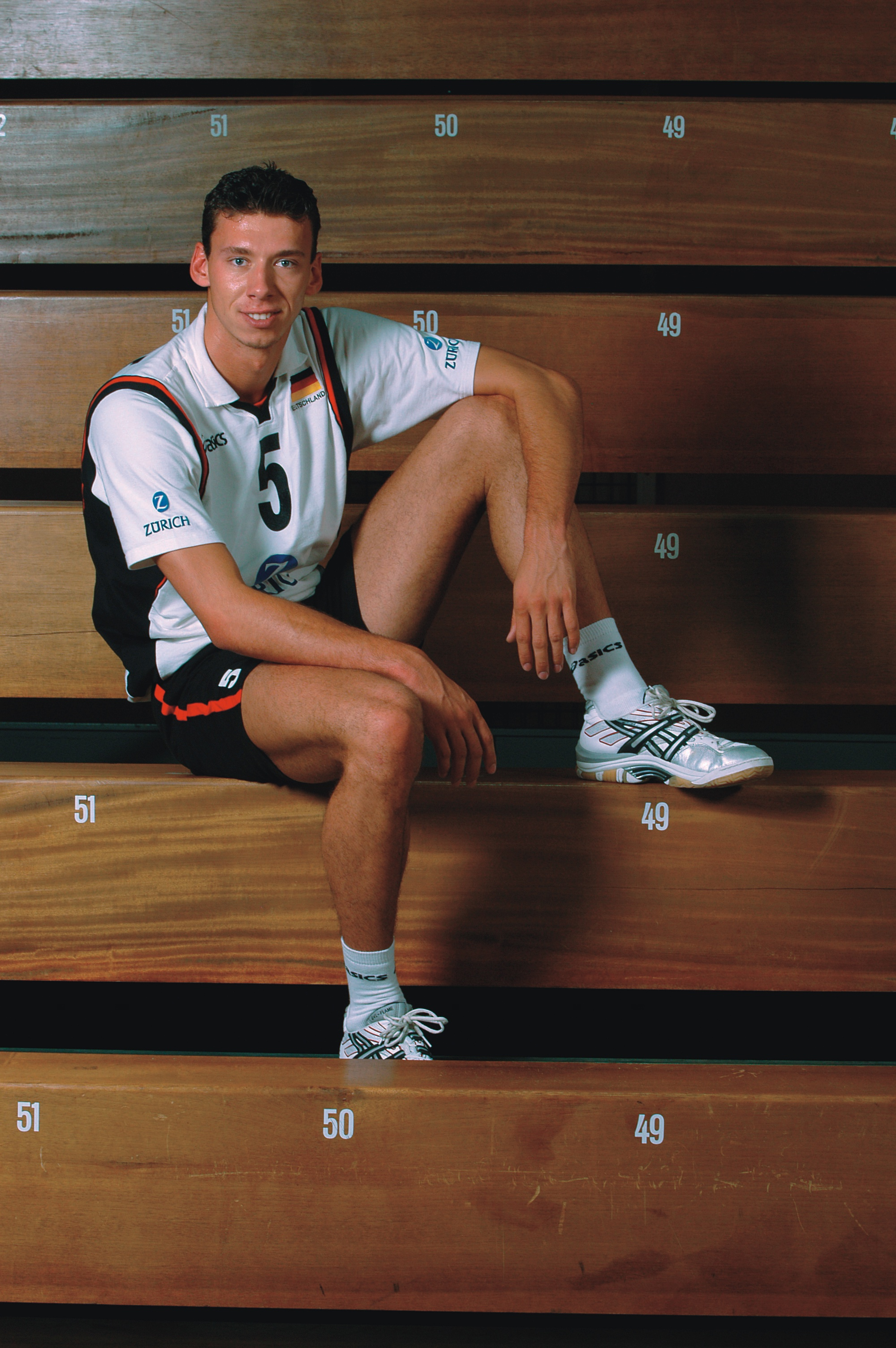

Personal information
- Full name: Björn Andrae
- Nationality: German
- Born: 14 May 1981 (age 45); Berlin, Germany
- Height: 2.00 m (6 ft 7 in)
- Weight: 90 kg (198 lb)
- Spike: 355 cm (140 in)
- Block: 335 cm (132 in)

Volleyball information
- Position: Outside hitter
- Current club: SWD Powervolleys Düren
- Number: 8

Career
Years	Teams
1996–2000; 2000–2003; 2003–2005; 2005–2007; 2007–2008; 2008–2009; 2009–2010; 2010–2013; 2014; 2014–2015; 2015–2016; 2016–2018; 2018–	SCC Berlin; VfB Friedrichshafen; Noicom Cuneo; Sempre Volley; Mlekpol AZS Olsztyn; Panathinaikos Athens; Tonno Callipo Vibo Valentia; Kuzbass Kemerovo; Ural Ufa; Kuzbass Kemerovo; VfB Friedrichshafen; Netzhoppers KW; SWD Powervolleys Düren

National team
Germany
- Last updated: 19 February 2023

Björn Andrae (born 14 May 1981) is a German volleyball player, a member of Germany men's national volleyball team and German club Netzhoppers KW, a participant of the Olympic Games (2008, 2012).

== Career ==
Three times in a row he was chosen the German Volleyball Player of the Year (2004, 2005, 2006). With VfB Friedrichshafen Andrae won two titles of German Champion (2001, 2002). After few years in German and Italian clubs he went to Polish team Mlekpol AZS Olsztyn. He achieved bronze medal of 2007–08 Polish Volleyball League. Then he went to Greek Panathinaikos Athens and achieved with its silver medal in 2008–09 CEV Cup and also silver of Greek Championship. Then he came back to Italian league to represent Tonno Callipo Vibo Valentia for one season. In 2010 he started to play in Russian Superleague, from 201 to 2013 Kuzbass Kemerovo, then a few months in Ural Ufa and another season 2014/15 in the first one. In 2015 he came back to VfB Friedrichshafen and achieved silver medal of German Championship. Since 2016 he has been playing as Netzhoppers KW player.

== Achievements ==
=== Clubs ===
==== CEV Cup ====
- 2008/2009, with Panathinaikos Athens
- 1998/1999, with SCC Berlin

==== National championships ====
- 1999/2000 German Cup, with VfB Friedrichshafen
- 2000/2001 German Cup, with VfB Friedrichshafen
- 2000/2001 German Championship, with VfB Friedrichshafen
- 2001/2002 German Cup, with VfB Friedrichshafen
- 2001/2002 German Championship, with VfB Friedrichshafen
- 2002/2003 German Cup, with VfB Friedrichshafen
- 2007/2008 Polish Championship, with Mlekpol AZS Olsztyn
- 2008/2009 Greek Championship, with Panathinaikos Athens
- 2015/2016 German Championship, with VfB Friedrichshafen

=== Individual ===
- 2004 European League – Best Server
- 2004 German Volleyball Player of the Year
- 2005 German Volleyball Player of the Year
- 2006 German Volleyball Player of the Year

Awards
Preceded by (Germany) Christian Pampel	German Volleyball Player of the Year; 2004–2006	Succeeded by (Germany) Jochen Schöps
