= Ariane Radfan =

German volleyball player (born 1965)

Personal information
- Born: 5 April 1965 (age 61); Sangerhausen, East Germany
- Height: 184 cm (6 ft 0 in)

Volleyball information
- Position: Middle blocker
- Number: 4 (East Germany)

National team
1983–1989; 1991	East Germany; Germany
Honours
Women's volleyball
Representing East Germany
Friendship Games
Bronze medal – third place	1984 Varna
European Championship
Gold medal – first place	1983 East Germany
Gold medal – first place	1987 Belgium
Silver medal – second place	1985 Netherlands
Silver medal – second place	1989 West Germany
Representing Germany
European Championship
Bronze medal – third place	1991 Italy

Ariane Radfan (later Hornung, born 5 April 1965) is a German former volleyball player. She competed for East Germany in the women's tournament at the 1988 Summer Olympics in Seoul. Her younger sister Constance also played the sport, taking part in the 1996 Summer Olympics for the unified Germany team.

Awards
Preceded by Gudula Staub	German Volleyball Player of the Year; 1990	Succeeded by Ines Pianka
