= Angerbach =

River in Germany

Anger Angerbach
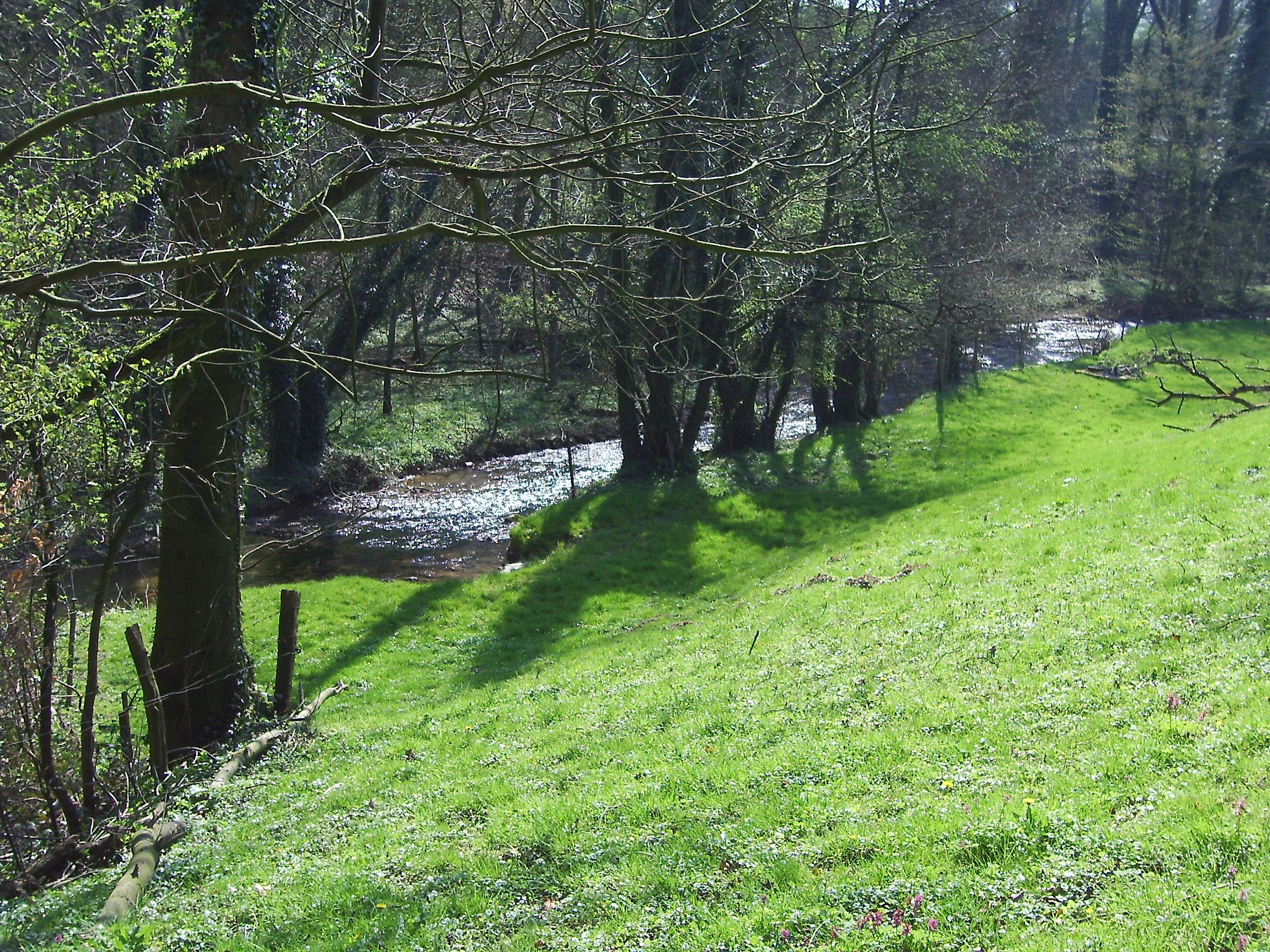

Location
- Country: Germany
- State: North Rhine-Westphalia

Physical characteristics
- Mouth
  - location: Rhine
  - coordinates: 51°22′46″N 6°43′39″E
- Length: 35.718 km (22.194 mi)

Basin features
- Progression: Rhine→ North Sea

The Anger (formerly also Angerbach) is a right tributary of the Rhine in North Rhine-Westphalia, Germany. It flows through Wülfrath and Ratingen, and discharges into the Rhine in Angerhausen, a district in the southern part of Duisburg.

== See also ==
- List of rivers of North Rhine-Westphalia
