= Renate Riek =

German volleyball player (born 1960)

Personal information
- Full name: Renate Riek (-Bauer)
- Nationality: German
- Born: 11 March 1960 (age 65); Stuttgart, West Germany
- Height: 170 cm (5 ft 7 in)

Sport
- Sport: Volleyball

Renate Riek (born 11 March 1960) is a German former volleyball player. She competed in the women's tournament at the 1984 Summer Olympics.

Awards
Preceded by Sigrid Terstegge	German Volleyball Player of the Year; 1987	Succeeded by Gudrun Witte
