= Marina Staden =

German volleyball player (born 1955)

Personal information
- Nationality: German
- Born: 17 December 1955 (age 69); Moscow, Soviet Union

Sport
- Sport: Volleyball

Marina Staden (born 17 December 1955) is a German volleyball player. She competed in the women's tournament at the 1984 Summer Olympics.

Awards
Preceded by Silvia Meiertöns	German Volleyball Player of the Year; 1980, 1981	Succeeded by Gabi Lorenz

Awards
Preceded by Terry Place-Brandel	German Volleyball Player of the Year; 1984	Succeeded by Kim Ae-Hee
