= Ulrike Schmidt (volleyball) =

German beach volleyball player (born 1969)

Personal information
- Nationality: German
- Born: 30 March 1969 (age 56); Remscheid, West Germany

Sport
- Sport: Beach volleyball

Ulrike Schmidt (born 30 March 1969) is a German former beach volleyball player. She competed in the women's tournament at the 2000 Summer Olympics.

Awards
Preceded by Sylvia Roll	German Volleyball Player of the Year; 1998	Succeeded by Judith Flemig
