= Wolfgang Kuck =

German volleyball player (born 1967)

Wolfgang Kuck (born 12 October 1967 in Wülfrath, North Rhine-Westphalia) is a volleyball player from Germany, who played for the Men's National Team in the 1990s and the early 2000s. He earned a total number of 203 caps for the national squad. He was German Volleyball Player of the Year three times: 1994, 1996 and 1997.

Awards
Preceded by (Germany) Michael Dornheim	German Volleyball Player of the Year; 1994	Succeeded by (Germany) Dirk Oldenburg
Preceded by (Germany) Dirk Oldenburg	German Volleyball Player of the Year; 1996 – 1997	Succeeded by (Germany) Stefan Hübner
