= Toni Rimrod =

German volleyball player (born 1948)

Personal information
- Nationality: German
- Born: 22 January 1948 (age 77); Schweinfurt, Germany

Sport
- Sport: Volleyball

Toni Rimrod (born 22 January 1948) is a German volleyball player. He competed in the men's tournament at the 1972 Summer Olympics.
