= Christian Pampel =

German volleyball player (born 1979)

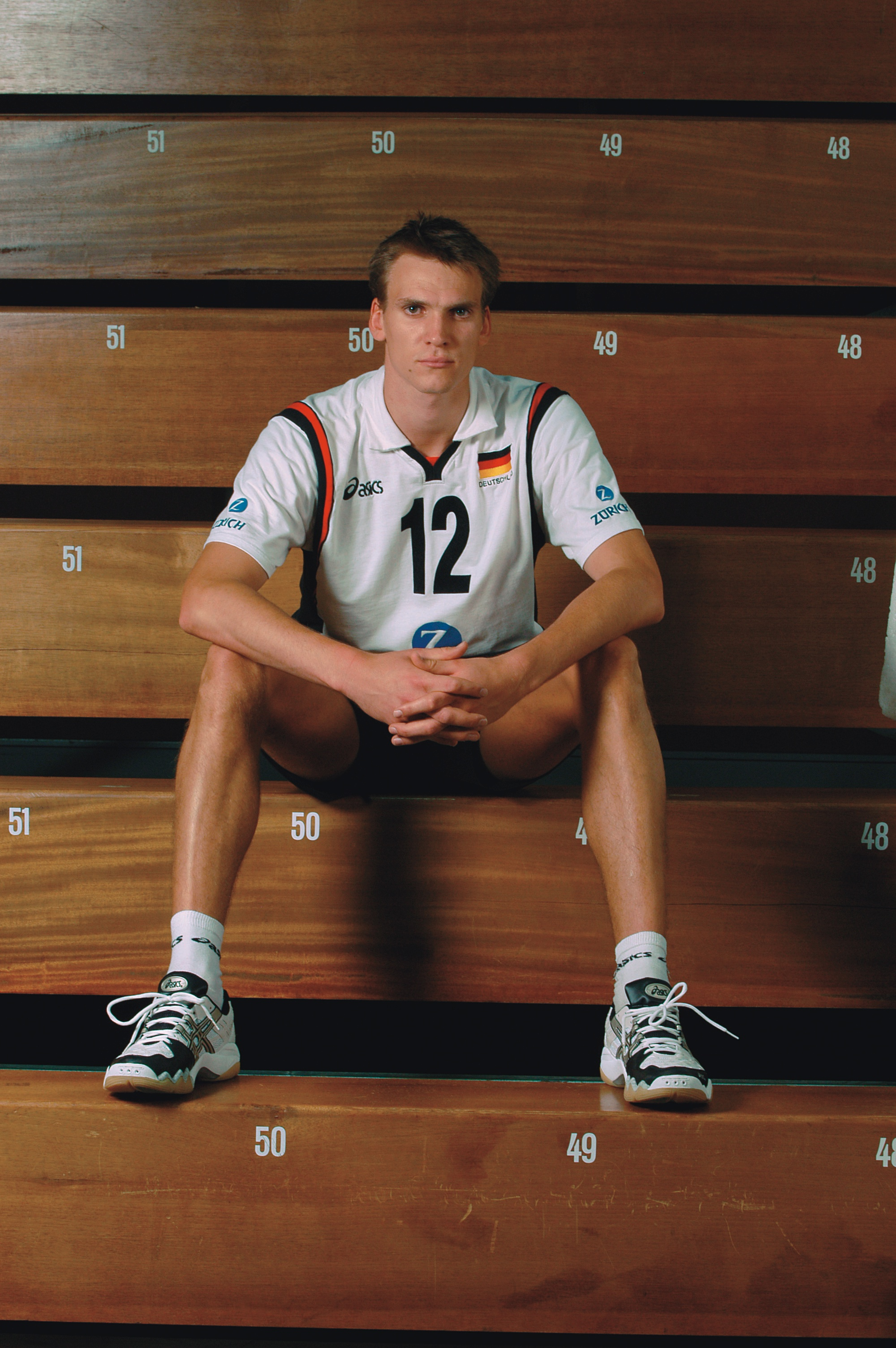
- Christian Pampel

Personal information
- Nationality: German
- Born: 6 September 1979 (age 47); Gehrden, West Germany
- Height: 1.98 m (6 ft 6 in)
- Weight: 90 kg (198 lb)
- Spike: 3.65 m (144 in)

Volleyball information
- Position: Coach / Opposite
- Current team: TSV Mimmenhausen
- Number: 4

Career
Years	Teams
1996-1999; 1999-2003; 2003-2004; 2004-2005; 2005-2006; 2006; 2006-2007; 2007-2008; 2008; 2008-2009; 2009; 2009-2013; 2013-2016; 2016-2024	Volleyball Internat Frankfurt; VfB Friedrichshafen; Esse-ti Carilo Loreto; Tonno Callipo Vibo Valentia; Semprevolley Padua; Olympiacos Piraeus; Semprevolley Padua; VfB Friedrichshafen; Gazprom-Ugra Surgut; Copra Piacenza; Gumi LIG Greaters Seoul; Al-Arabi Doha; Al Jaish Sport Club Doha; TSV Mimmenhausen

National team
Germany
- Last updated: 27 April 2025

Christian Pampel (born 6 September 1979 in Gehrden) is a retired volleyball player from Germany.

== Career ==
Christian Pampel started his career in Hochstetten in 1995. After three years in the Volleyball-boarding school Frankfurt, he went to the first division club VfB Friedrichshafenin in 1999, won his first championship in 2000, and made it to the final of the Champions League in 2000. In 2001, he won both the German championship and the German cup and took part at the European Volleyball Championship in the Czech Republic. In 2002, he won the German championship and cup again. In the following European Volleyball Championship in Germany, he was one of the best players, second in the Top-Scorer Ranking and got elected German Volleyball-player of the year 2003. Then he went to play in Italy. For the second division (A2) club Loreto first, then in the first division (A1) club Vibo Valentia where he made it to the final of the Italian cup and the playoffs. In 2005, he went to the A1-club Semprevolley Padua and got elected A1-player of the month February 2006. For the playoffs he was hired by the Greek powerhouse Olympiacos Piraeus but followed his contract with Padova the next championship. He was part of the German National team taking part at the 2006 World Championship held in Japan (9th rank), as well as in the 2007 European Championship in Russia (5th rank). In 2007, he went back to Friedrichshafen and again won the German Cup and Championship. With the national team he made it to the Olympic games in Beijin 2008 (9th rank). After that he played for Gazprom-Jugra Surgut until September and was then hired by the Italian A1-club Copra Volley Piacenza where he won the Italian Championship 2009. After a summer in South Korea, he went to Qatar in December 2009 and won the GCC Cup in 2010. He won the Qatar Championship in 2010, 2011 and 2012. In 2012, he won the 2012 Asian Men's Club Volleyball Championship with Al Arabi and was Top Scorer of the tournament. In 2010, 2011, and 2012, he participated in the FIVB Men's Club World Championship. Since 2016 Pampel is Head Coach and Player of TSV Mimmenhausen in the 2nd Bundesliga Germany (until 2018 one League below).
