= 2014 FIVB Volleyball Men's Club World Championship squads =

This article shows all participating team squads at the 2014 FIVB Volleyball Men's Club World Championship, held from 5 to 10 May 2014 in Belo Horizonte, Brazil.

== Pool A ==
=== Sada Cruzeiro ===
- Head Coach: (Argentina) Marcelo Méndez

Number	Player
2	(Brazil) Raphael Margarido
4	(Brazil) Douglas Cordeiro
5	(Brazil) Paulo Victor da Silva
7	(Brazil) William Arjona (c)
8	(Brazil) Wallace de Souza
9	(Cuba) Yoandry Leal
12	(Brazil) Isac Santos
14	(Venezuela) Luis Díaz
16	(Brazil) Éder Carbonera
17	(Brazil) Sérgio Nogueira (L)
18	(Brazil) Filipe Ferraz
20	(Brazil) Carlos Eduardo Barreto Filho

=== Belogorie Belgorod ===
- Head Coach: (Russia) Gennadiy Shipulin

Number	Player
3	(Russia) Aleksandr Kosarev
4	(Russia) Taras Khtey (c)
5	(Russia) Aleksandr Bogomolov
6	(Russia) Aleksey Kazakov
7	(Russia) Maxim Panteleymonenko
8	(Russia) Sergey Tetyukhin
9	(Germany) György Grozer
10	(Russia) Roman Bragin (L)
13	(Russia) Dmitriy Muserskiy
14	(Italy) Dragan Travica
15	(Russia) Dmitriy Ilinikh
16	(Russia) Sergey Bagrey

=== Matin Varamin ===
- Head Coach: (Italy) Daniele Bagnoli

Number	Player
2	(Iran) Mostafa Sharifat
3	(Iran) Mohammad Taher Vadi
6	(Iran) Saeed Mostafavand (c)
7	(Iran) Pouria Fayazi
8	(Iran) Ahsanollah Shirkavand (L)
9	(Iran) Ali Asghar Razm Far
10	(Iran) Mikaeil Tajer
11	(Iran) Behzad Heidarishahi
12	(Iran) Seyed Ali Sajadi
16	(Iran) Saeid Shirood
17	(Iran) Alireza Nasr Esfahani
18	(Iran) Farhad Piroutpour

=== Mets de Guaynabo ===
- Head Coach: (Puerto Rico) Javier Gaspar

Number	Player
1	(Puerto Rico) Orlando Irizarry
2	(Puerto Rico) Jorge De Jesús
4	(Puerto Rico) Dennis Del Valle (L)
5	(Venezuela) Edwin Montaño
6	(Puerto Rico) Ángel Pérez
7	(Puerto Rico) Enrique Escalante (c)
8	(Puerto Rico) Jonathan King
10	(Puerto Rico) Ezequiel Cruz
11	(Puerto Rico) Sequiel Sánchez
16	(Puerto Rico) Jackson Rivera
17	(Puerto Rico) Jean Carlos Ortiz
18	(Puerto Rico) Mannix Román

== Pool B ==
=== Trentino Diatec ===
- Head Coach: (Italy) Roberto Serniotti

Number	Player
2	(Italy) Giacomo Sintini
3	(Italy) Emanuele Birarelli (c)
4	(Argentina) Sebastián Solé
6	(Portugal) Alexandre Ferreira
7	(United States) Donald Suxho
8	(Italy) Sebastiano Thei
9	(Italy) Tiziano Mazzone
10	(Italy) Filippo Lanza
11	(Bulgaria) Tsvetan Sokolov
13	(Italy) Massimo Colaci (L)
17	(Italy) Matteo Burgsthaler
18	(Netherlands) Kay van Dijk

=== UPCN San Juan ===
- Head Coach: (Argentina) Fabián Armoa

Number	Player
1	(Argentina) Sebastián Fernández
2	(Argentina) Lucas Tell
3	(Argentina) Francisco Lloveras
4	(Argentina) Sebastián Garrocq (L)
7	(Brazil) Théo Lopes
8	(Argentina) Demián González (c)
9	(Romania) Bogdan Alexandru Olteanu
10	(Argentina) Nicolás Lazo
11	(Argentina) Rodrigo Peres Lopes
14	(Argentina) Javier Filardi
16	(Brazil) José Santos Júnior
18	(Argentina) Martín Ramos

=== Al-Rayyan ===
- Head Coach: (Croatia) Igor Arbutina

Number	Player
1	(Bulgaria) Matey Kaziyski
2	(Qatar) Ali Hassan Asadi
4	(Qatar) Mohamed Al-Oui
5	(Morocco) Mohamed Hachdadi
6	(Cuba) Michael Sánchez
7	(Brazil) Raphael Vieira de Oliveira
9	(Qatar) Ali Bairami (c)
10	(Qatar) Mohammed Abdulla
11	(Cuba) Robertlandy Simón
12	(Qatar) Mubarak Dahi Waleed
13	(Qatar) Ali Hamed Yaqub
16	(Brazil) Alan Domingos (L)

=== Espérance de Tunis ===
- Head Coach: (Tunisia) Foued Kamoun

Number	Player
2	(Russia) Alexander Sorokoletov
6	(Tunisia) Skander Ben Tara
7	(Tunisia) Elyes Karamosli
8	(Tunisia) Mohamed Ben Slimen
9	(Tunisia) Elyes Garfi
10	(Tunisia) Hichem Kaabi
12	(Tunisia) Mahdi Ben Cheikh (c)
13	(Tunisia) Malek Chekir
14	(Tunisia) Bilel Ben Hassine
16	(Tunisia) Chokri Jouini
17	(Tunisia) Aymen Karoui
18	(Tunisia) Saddem Hmissi (L)
