= Shipulin =

Shipulin (Russian: Шипулин) is a Russian masculine surname, its feminine counterpart is Shipulina. It may refer to

- Anastasiya Shipulina, maiden name of Anastasiya Kuzmina, Russian-born Slovak biathlete
- Anton Shipulin (born 1987), Russian biathlete
- Gennadiy Shipulin (born 1954), Russian volleyball coach
- Sergei Shipulin (born 1978), Russian footballer
- Yekaterina Shipulina (born 1979), Russian ballerina
