= Maksim Zhigalov =

Russian volleyball player (born 1989)

Maxim Zhigalov

Personal information
- Full name: Maxim Olegovich Zhigalov
- Nationality: (Russia) Russian
- Born: 26 July 1989 (age 37); Shymkent, Soviet Union, Kazakhstan
- Height: 2.03 m (6 ft 8 in)
- Weight: 92 kg (203 lb)
- Spike: 344 cm (135 in)
- Block: 329 cm (130 in)

Volleyball information
- Position: Opposite
- Current club: (United Arab Emirates) Shabab Al Ahli Club
- Number: 8

Career
Years	Teams
2009–2015; 2015–2016; 2016–2017; 2017–2018; 2018–2019; 2019–2020; 2020–2021; 2021–2022; 2023; 2023–	(Russia) Belogorie Belgorod (Russia) Kuzbass Kemerovo (Russia) Belogorie Belgorod (Russia) Lokomotiv Novosibirsk (Poland) Czarni Radom (Russia) Dynamo Moscow (Russia) Fakel Novy Urengoy (Russia) VC Dynamo-LO (China) Tianjin Food Group (United Arab Emirates) Shabab Al Ahli Club

National team
2011–2021	Russia
Honours
Men's volleyball
Representing Russia
CEV European Championship
Gold medal – first place	2017 Poland
European Games
Bronze medal – third place	2015 Azerbaijan

Maksim Olegovich Zhigalov (Russian: Максим Олегович Жигалов) (born 26 July 1989) is a Russian volleyball player, member of the Russia men's national volleyball team and Tianjin Food Group.

== Sporting achievements ==
=== Clubs ===
- CEV Champions League
  - 2013/2014 – with Belogorie Belgorod
- FIVB Club World Championship
  - Belo Horizonte 2014 – with Belogorie Belgorod
- National championships
  - 2009/2010 Russian Championship, with Belogorie Belgorod
  - 2012/2013 Russian Cup, with Belogorie Belgorod
  - 2012/2013 Russian Championship, with Belogorie Belgorod
  - 2013/2014 Russian SuperCup, with Belogorie Belgorod
  - 2013/2014 Russian Cup, with Belogorie Belgorod
  - 2014/2015 Russian SuperCup, with Belogorie Belgorod
  - 2014/2015 Russian Championship, with Belogorie Belgorod

=== Universiade ===
- 2013 Summer Universiade

=== Individual awards ===
- 2013: Summer Universiade – Most Valuable Player
- 2013: Summer Universiade – Best Opposite
