= Ruslan Khanipov =

Russian volleyball player (born 1989)

Personal information
- Nationality: Russian
- Born: 29 March 1989 (age 37)
- Height: 6 ft 11 in (2.10 m)
- Weight: 243 lb (110 kg)
- Spike: 140 in (350 cm)
- Block: 132 in (335 cm)

Volleyball information
- Position: Middle blocker
- Current club: (Russia) Yaroslavich
- Number: 16

Career
Years	Teams
2009–2014; 2014–2015; 2015–2016; 2016–2017; 2017–2019; 2019–2020; 2020–	(Russia) Belogorie Belgorod (Russia) Gazprom-Ugra Surgut (Russia) Belogorie Belgorod (Russia) Ural Ufa (Russia) Belogorie Belgorod (Russia) Enisey Krasnoyarsk (Russia) Yaroslavich

Ruslan Khanipov (born 29 March 1989) is a Russian volleyball player, a member of the club VC Yaroslavich.

== Sporting achievements ==
=== Clubs ===
Russian Super League:

- 2013
- 2010
- 2011, 2014, 2016

Russian Cup:

- 2012, 2013

Russian SuperCup:

- 2013

CEV Champions League:

- 2014

CEV Cup:

- 2018
