= 2002 FIVB Volleyball World League =

International sport competition

2002 World League
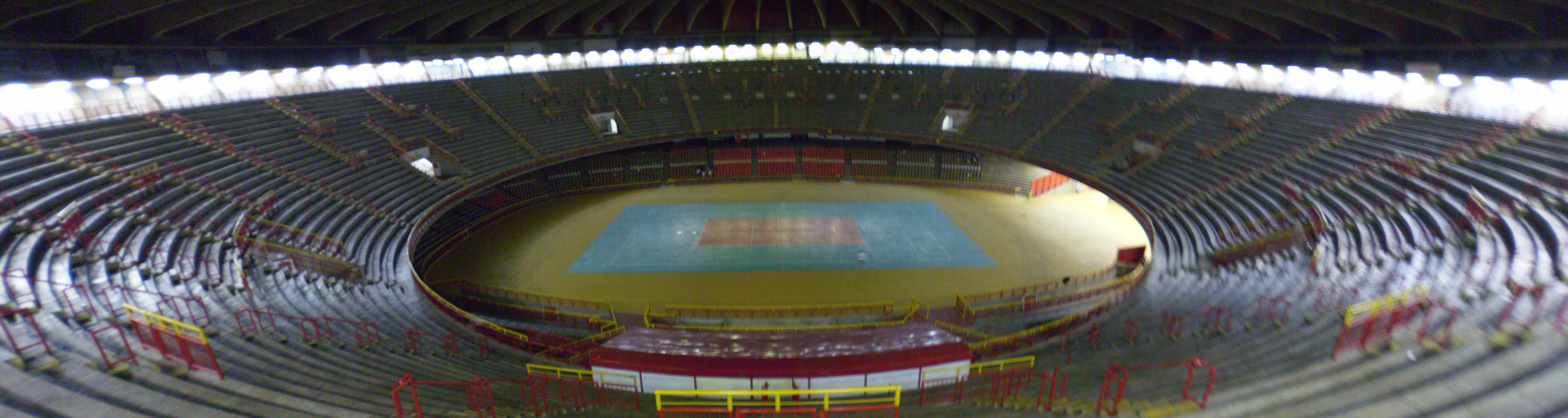
- Mineirinho Host Final

Tournament details
- Host country: Brazil (Final)
- Dates: 27 June – 18 August
- Teams: 16

Final positions
- Champions: Russia (1st title)

Tournament awards
- MVP: (Serbia and Montenegro) Ivan Miljković

The 2002 FIVB Volleyball World League was the 13th edition of the annual men's international volleyball tournament, played by 16 countries from 27 June to 18 August 2002. The Final Round was held in Belo Horizonte (Main) and Recife (Sub), Brazil.

== Pools composition ==
Pool A	Pool B	Pool C	Pool D
Brazil; Poland; Argentina; Portugal	Italy; Spain; China; Venezuela	Russia; Cuba; Netherlands; Germany	Yugoslavia; France; Greece; Japan

== Intercontinental round ==
- The top two teams in each pool will qualify for the Final Round. If the Final Round hosts Brazil finish lower than second in their pool, they will still qualify along with the best three second teams across all four pools.

=== Pool A ===
Pos	Team	Pld	W	L	Pts	SW	SL	SR	SPW	SPL	SPR	Qualification
1	Brazil (Note: Qualified as hosts) (H)	12	9	3	21	31	14	2.214	1059	926	1.144	Final round
2	Poland	12	8	4	20	28	21	1.333	1141	1116	1.022	Final round
3	Argentina	12	4	8	16	19	26	0.731	1004	1040	0.965	
4	Portugal	12	3	9	15	15	32	0.469	976	1098	0.889	

(H) Host
Notes:

Date		Score		Set 1	Set 2	Set 3	Set 4	Set 5	Total	Report
28 Jun	Brazil	3–1	Argentina	23–25	25–17	25–23	25–20		98–85	P2
29 Jun	Brazil	3–0	Argentina	25–21	25–21	25–19			75–61	P2
29 Jun	Portugal	3–2	Poland	21–25	25–19	28–30	25–21	15–11	114–106	P2
30 Jun	Portugal	2–3	Poland	25–22	25–23	17–25	22–25	15–17	104–112	P2
6 Jul	Portugal	0–3	Brazil	16–25	24–26	22–25			62–76	P2
6 Jul	Argentina	3–0	Poland	25–22	36–34	25–19			86–75	P2
7 Jul	Argentina	3–0	Poland	25–23	33–31	25–21			83–75	P2
7 Jul	Portugal	0–3	Brazil	17–25	17–25	17–25			51–75	P2
12 Jul	Brazil	0–3	Poland	21–25	22–25	25–27			68–77	P2
13 Jul	Brazil	3–2	Poland	30–28	22–25	21–25	25–10	15–9	113–97	P2
13 Jul	Portugal	3–1	Argentina	19–25	25–23	25–22	25–23		94–93	P2
14 Jul	Portugal	3–2	Argentina	25–21	14–25	22–25	25–18	15–11	101–100	P2
19 Jul	Brazil	3–0	Portugal	25–23	25–15	25–17			75–55	P2
19 Jul	Poland	3–1	Argentina	23–25	25–22	25–20	25–18		98–85	P2
20 Jul	Brazil	3–0	Portugal	25–14	25–16	25–17			75–47	P2
20 Jul	Poland	3–0	Argentina	25–13	27–25	25–20			77–58	P2
26 Jul	Poland	3–2	Brazil	25–23	20–25	22–25	25–23	15–13	107–109	P2
27 Jul	Poland	3–2	Brazil	25–22	23–25	27–25	21–25	15–12	111–109	P2
27 Jul	Argentina	3–0	Portugal	25–18	25–20	25–18			75–56	P2
28 Jul	Argentina	3–2	Portugal	25–19	26–24	21–25	18–25	15–12	105–105	P2
2 Aug	Poland	3–1	Portugal	26–28	25–21	25–20	25–22		101–91	P2
2 Aug	Argentina	2–3	Brazil	25–17	19–25	20–25	27–25	13–15	104–107	P2
3 Aug	Poland	3–1	Portugal	35–33	25–15	20–25	25–23		105–96	P2
3 Aug	Argentina	0–3	Brazil	27–29	22–25	20–25			69–79	P2

=== Pool B ===
Pos	Team	Pld	W	L	Pts	SW	SL	SR	SPW	SPL	SPR	Qualification
1	Italy	12	11	1	23	33	10	3.300	1044	908	1.150	Final round
2	Spain	12	8	4	20	26	18	1.444	1002	1008	0.994	Final round
3	China	12	4	8	16	21	27	0.778	1069	1088	0.983	
4	Venezuela	12	1	11	13	9	34	0.265	936	1047	0.894	

Date		Score		Set 1	Set 2	Set 3	Set 4	Set 5	Total	Report
28 Jun	China	2–3	Italy	27–25	23–25	25–18	11–25	8–15	94–108	P2
28 Jun	Spain	3–0	Venezuela	25–21	25–23	25–21			75–65	P2
30 Jun	Spain	3–0	Venezuela	25–23	25–19	31–29			81–71	P2
30 Jun	China	0–3	Italy	20–25	18–25	23–25			61–75	P2
5 Jul	Italy	3–1	Venezuela	25–21	25–18	22–25	25–21		97–85	P2
6 Jul	Spain	3–0	China	25–22	25–23	25–17			75–62	P2
7 Jul	Spain	3–1	China	19–25	25–19	25–22	25–23		94–89	P2
7 Jul	Italy	3–0	Venezuela	25–19	25–21	25–18			75–58	P2
12 Jul	Italy	3–1	China	20–25	25–23	25–21	25–21		95–90	P2
12 Jul	Venezuela	0–3	Spain	18–25	23–25	16–25			57–75	P2
14 Jul	Venezuela	1–3	Spain	24–26	19–25	25–23	22–25		90–99	P2
14 Jul	Italy	0–3	China	23–25	23–25	25–27			71–77	P2
19 Jul	Venezuela	1–3	Italy	19–25	25–18	25–27	20–25		89–95	P2
20 Jul	China	2–3	Spain	27–29	25–17	25–18	23–25	16–18	116–107	P2
21 Jul	China	2–3	Spain	25–23	25–19	21–25	25–27	17–19	113–113	P2
21 Jul	Venezuela	0–3	Italy	31–33	18–25	22–25			71–83	P2
27 Jul	Spain	0–3	Italy	19–25	18–25	15–25			52–75	P2
27 Jul	China	3–0	Venezuela	25–19	25–21	25–18			75–58	P2
28 Jul	Spain	1–3	Italy	21–25	23–25	25–22	21–25		90–97	P2
28 Jul	China	3–1	Venezuela	22–25	25–22	25–21	25–18		97–86	P2
2 Aug	Venezuela	2–3	China	27–29	25–19	25–20	16–25	12–15	105–108	P2
2 Aug	Italy	3–1	Spain	25–14	22–25	25–18	25–23		97–80	P2
4 Aug	Venezuela	3–1	China	25–20	25–18	26–28	25–21		101–87	P2
4 Aug	Italy	3–0	Spain	26–24	25–18	25–19			76–61	P2

=== Pool C ===
Pos	Team	Pld	W	L	Pts	SW	SL	SR	SPW	SPL	SPR	Qualification
1	Russia	12	11	1	23	34	12	2.833	1102	967	1.140	Final round
2	Netherlands	12	7	5	19	23	23	1.000	1021	1056	0.967	Final round
3	Germany	12	4	8	16	21	30	0.700	1145	1164	0.984	
4	Cuba	12	2	10	14	18	31	0.581	1045	1126	0.928	

Date		Score		Set 1	Set 2	Set 3	Set 4	Set 5	Total	Report
27 Jun	Germany	3–1	Netherlands	25–17	22–25	25–20	25–14		97–76	P2
28 Jun	Russia	3–0	Cuba	25–21	25–22	25–18			75–61	P2
28 Jun	Germany	0–3	Netherlands	22–25	19–25	27–29			68–79	P2
29 Jun	Russia	3–2	Cuba	19–25	25–14	20–25	25–22	15–10	104–96	P2
5 Jul	Russia	3–2	Germany	25–27	25–22	25–21	30–32	17–15	122–117	P2
5 Jul	Netherlands	3–1	Cuba	25–15	24–26	25–17	25–18		99–76	P2
6 Jul	Russia	1–3	Germany	18–25	25–17	23–25	17–25		83–92	P2
6 Jul	Netherlands	3–1	Cuba	25–17	23–25	25–20	29–27		102–89	P2
12 Jul	Netherlands	1–3	Russia	12–25	25–23	20–25	17–25		74–98	P2
12 Jul	Cuba	3–1	Germany	17–25	25–21	28–26	25–21		95–93	P2
13 Jul	Netherlands	0–3	Russia	19–25	27–29	18–25			64–79	P2
13 Jul	Cuba	3–0	Germany	25–22	25–23	26–24			76–69	P2
19 Jul	Netherlands	3–2	Germany	27–25	25–19	22–25	23–25	15–12	112–106	P2
19 Jul	Cuba	1–3	Russia	25–21	20–25	19–25	18–25		82–96	P2
20 Jul	Netherlands	3–1	Germany	19–25	25–21	25–23	25–21		94–90	P2
20 Jul	Cuba	0–3	Russia	19–25	22–25	19–25			60–75	P2
26 Jul	Cuba	1–3	Netherlands	22–25	20–25	26–24	23–25		91–99	P2
27 Jul	Germany	1–3	Russia	13–25	26–28	25–18	33–35		97–106	P2
27 Jul	Cuba	2–3	Netherlands	20–25	25–17	21–25	25–22	11–15	102–104	P2
28 Jul	Germany	2–3	Russia	18–25	26–24	22–25	25–13	15–17	106–104	P2
2 Aug	Russia	3–0	Netherlands	25–19	25–15	35–33			85–67	P2
3 Aug	Germany	3–2	Cuba	25–20	24–26	25–23	19–25	20–18	113–112	P2
3 Aug	Russia	3–0	Netherlands	25–14	25–20	25–17			75–51	P2
4 Aug	Germany	3–2	Cuba	25–23	17–25	15–25	25–19	15–13	97–105	P2

=== Pool D ===
Pos	Team	Pld	W	L	Pts	SW	SL	SR	SPW	SPL	SPR	Qualification
1	France	12	9	3	21	29	18	1.611	1094	1028	1.064	Final round
2	Yugoslavia	12	8	4	20	29	17	1.706	1056	985	1.072	Final round
3	Greece	12	6	6	18	23	23	1.000	1045	1025	1.020	
4	Japan	12	1	11	13	11	34	0.324	946	1103	0.858	

Date		Score		Set 1	Set 2	Set 3	Set 4	Set 5	Total	Report
28 Jun	France	3–0	Yugoslavia	25–21	25–22	25–18			75–61	P2
28 Jun	Greece	3–0	Japan	25–17	25–19	25–23			75–59	P2
29 Jun	France	3–1	Yugoslavia	19–25	25–20	25–22	25–18		94–85	P2
30 Jun	Greece	3–1	Japan	20–25	25–22	25–22	26–24		96–93	P2
5 Jul	Yugoslavia	3–0	Greece	25–19	25–22	25–19			75–60	P2
6 Jul	Japan	0–3	France	35–37	20–25	18–25			73–87	P2
7 Jul	Japan	1–3	France	16–25	22–25	25–23	21–25		84–98	P2
7 Jul	Yugoslavia	2–3	Greece	19–25	25–23	24–26	25–20	14–16	107–110	P2
12 Jul	Greece	2–3	France	27–29	25–22	20–25	25–21	13–15	110–112	P2
13 Jul	Yugoslavia	3–0	Japan	25–13	25–17	25–20			75–50	P2
14 Jul	Yugoslavia	3–0	Japan	25–20	25–15	25–20			75–55	P2
14 Jul	Greece	3–0	France	25–12	25–21	25–23			75–56	P2
19 Jul	France	3–2	Japan	22–25	25–21	26–28	25–14	15–7	113–95	P2
20 Jul	France	3–1	Japan	25–14	27–29	25–18	25–23		102–84	P2
21 Jul	Greece	0–3	Yugoslavia	17–25	22–25	27–29			66–79	P2
22 Jul	Greece	2–3	Yugoslavia	25–19	23–25	19–25	25–18	14–16	106–103	P2
26 Jul	France	1–3	Greece	20–25	17–25	25–17	24–26		86–93	P2
27 Jul	Japan	2–3	Yugoslavia	25–23	21–25	23–25	27–25	10–15	106–113	P2
27 Jul	France	3–0	Greece	25–21	25–21	25–23			75–65	P2
28 Jul	Japan	0–3	Yugoslavia	17–25	22–25	28–30			67–80	P2
2 Aug	Yugoslavia	2–3	France	25–20	23–25	21–25	25–19	11–15	105–104	P2
3 Aug	Japan	1–3	Greece	22–25	25–23	23–25	16–25		86–98	P2
4 Aug	Japan	3–1	Greece	19–25	25–21	25–23	25–22		94–91	P2
4 Aug	Yugoslavia	3–1	France	19–25	29–27	25–22	25–18		98–92	P2

== Final round ==
- All times are Brasília Official Time (UTC−03:00).

=== Pool play ===
==== Pool E ====
- Venue: Ginásio de Esportes Geraldo Magalhães, Recife, Brazil

Pos	Team	Pld	W	L	Pts	SW	SL	SR	SPW	SPL	SPR	Qualification
1	Brazil	3	3	0	6	9	1	9.000	249	214	1.164	Semifinals
2	Russia	3	1	2	4	5	6	0.833	256	255	1.004	Semifinals
3	Spain	3	1	2	4	5	8	0.625	285	308	0.925	
4	Netherlands	3	1	2	4	3	7	0.429	225	238	0.945	

Date	Time		Score		Set 1	Set 2	Set 3	Set 4	Set 5	Total	Report
13 Aug	15:33	Brazil	3–1	Spain	25–17	21–25	25–18	25–21		96–81	P2
13 Aug	18:00	Russia	3–0	Netherlands	25–22	25–22	25–17			75–61	P2
14 Aug	15:35	Brazil	3–0	Netherlands	25–23	25–18	25–23			75–64	P2
14 Aug	18:00	Russia	2–3	Spain	21–25	25–23	24–26	25–23	17–19	112–116	P2
15 Aug	15:32	Brazil	3–0	Russia	25–23	28–26	25–20			78–69	P2
15 Aug	18:00	Netherlands	3–1	Spain	25–20	25–27	25–23	25–18		100–88	P2

==== Pool F ====
- Venue: Mineirinho Arena, Belo Horizonte, Brazil

Pos	Team	Pld	W	L	Pts	SW	SL	SR	SPW	SPL	SPR	Qualification
1	Italy	3	3	0	6	9	3	3.000	283	238	1.189	Semifinals
2	Yugoslavia	3	2	1	5	8	3	2.667	256	222	1.153	Semifinals
3	Poland	3	1	2	4	4	6	0.667	207	239	0.866	
4	France	3	0	3	3	0	9	0.000	181	228	0.794	

Date	Time		Score		Set 1	Set 2	Set 3	Set 4	Set 5	Total	Report
13 Aug	17:30	Italy	3–0	France	25–14	25–23	25–21			75–58	P2
13 Aug	20:02	Yugoslavia	3–0	Poland	25–20	25–22	25–13			75–55	P2
14 Aug	17:30	Italy	3–1	Poland	22–25	25–19	25–15	25–15		97–74	P2
14 Aug	20:00	Yugoslavia	3–0	France	25–19	25–20	25–17			75–56	P2
15 Aug	17:30	Yugoslavia	2–3	Italy	25–22	23–25	18–25	25–22	15–17	106–111	P2
15 Aug	20:00	France	0–3	Poland	26–28	23–25	18–25			67–78	P2

=== Final four ===
- Venue: Mineirinho Arena, Belo Horizonte, Brazil

Semifinals
17 August
Brazil	3
Yugoslavia	2
17 August
Russia	3
Italy	1

Final
18 August
Brazil	1
Russia	3
3rd place match
18 August
Yugoslavia	3
Italy	1

==== Semifinals ====
Date	Time		Score		Set 1	Set 2	Set 3	Set 4	Set 5	Total	Report
17 Aug	10:10	Brazil	3–2	Yugoslavia	25–27	25–19	25–12	21–25	18–16	114–99	P2
17 Aug	12:40	Russia	3–1	Italy	23–25	25–19	25–20	25–22		98–86	P2

==== 3rd place match ====
Date	Time		Score		Set 1	Set 2	Set 3	Set 4	Set 5	Total	Report
18 Aug	09:00	Yugoslavia	3–1	Italy	28–26	29–27	23–25	25–21		105–99	P2

==== Final ====
Date	Time		Score		Set 1	Set 2	Set 3	Set 4	Set 5	Total	Report
18 Aug	11:30	Brazil	1–3	Russia	21–25	23–25	25–22	17–25		86–97	P2

== Final standing ==
Rank	Team
1st place, gold medalist(s)	Russia
2nd place, silver medalist(s)	Brazil
3rd place, bronze medalist(s)	Yugoslavia
4	Italy
5	Poland
5	Spain
7	France
7	Netherlands
9	Argentina
9	China
9	Germany
9	Greece
13	Cuba
13	Japan
13	Portugal
13	Venezuela

2002 World League champions

Russia
1st title

12-man Roster for Final Round
Khamuttskikh, Olikhver, Abramov, Mitkov, Tetyukhin, Yakovlev, Ushakov, Khtey, Egorchev, Kosarev, Gerasimov, Kuleshov
Head coach
Shipulin

== Awards ==
- Best scorer (most valuable player)
  (Federal Republic of Yugoslavia) Ivan Miljković
- Best spiker
  (Russia) Pavel Abramov
- Best blocker
  (Russia) Aleksey Kuleshov
- Best server
  (Russia) Vadim Khamuttskikh
