= Belgorod Arena =

Sports arena in Belgorod, Russia

Coordinates: 50.5735°N 36.5671°E

- Interactive map of Belgorod Arena
- Address: Belgorod; Russia

Construction
- Opened: 14 May 2021
- Cost: 4 million rubles ($48,296.12 USD as of 3/22/2026)

Belgorod Arena (Russian: Белгород-Арена) is a multifunctional sports arena in Belgorod, Russia. It is the home of the "VC Belogorie" volleyball club.

== Description ==
The arena is designed to host international competitions in volleyball, basketball, handball, futsal, tennis and other sports, and it is also possible to hold exhibitions, conferences, presentations, and cultural and entertainment events.

== Technical characteristics ==
The arena's exterior is decorated with stained-glass windows and a decorative floating canopy. The building's façade features a large screen that can broadcast matches.

== History ==
=== Construction ===
First, the buildings were demolished, the garbage was removed, piles were driven and the foundation was installed. In July 2019, builders installed reinforced concrete structures, and in October, they installed the roofing.

=== Opening of the arena ===
The arena opened on 14 May 2021. The ceremony was hosted by famous sports commentators Dmitry Guberniev and Olga Bogoslovskaya.

As of June 1, the new arena was included in the All-Russian Register of Sports Facilities.

== Incidents ==
On March 21, 2024, the administrative building of the arena was damaged as a result of the shelling of Belgorod by the Ukrainian Armed Forces.
