= Artem Smoliar =

Russian volleyball player (born 1985)

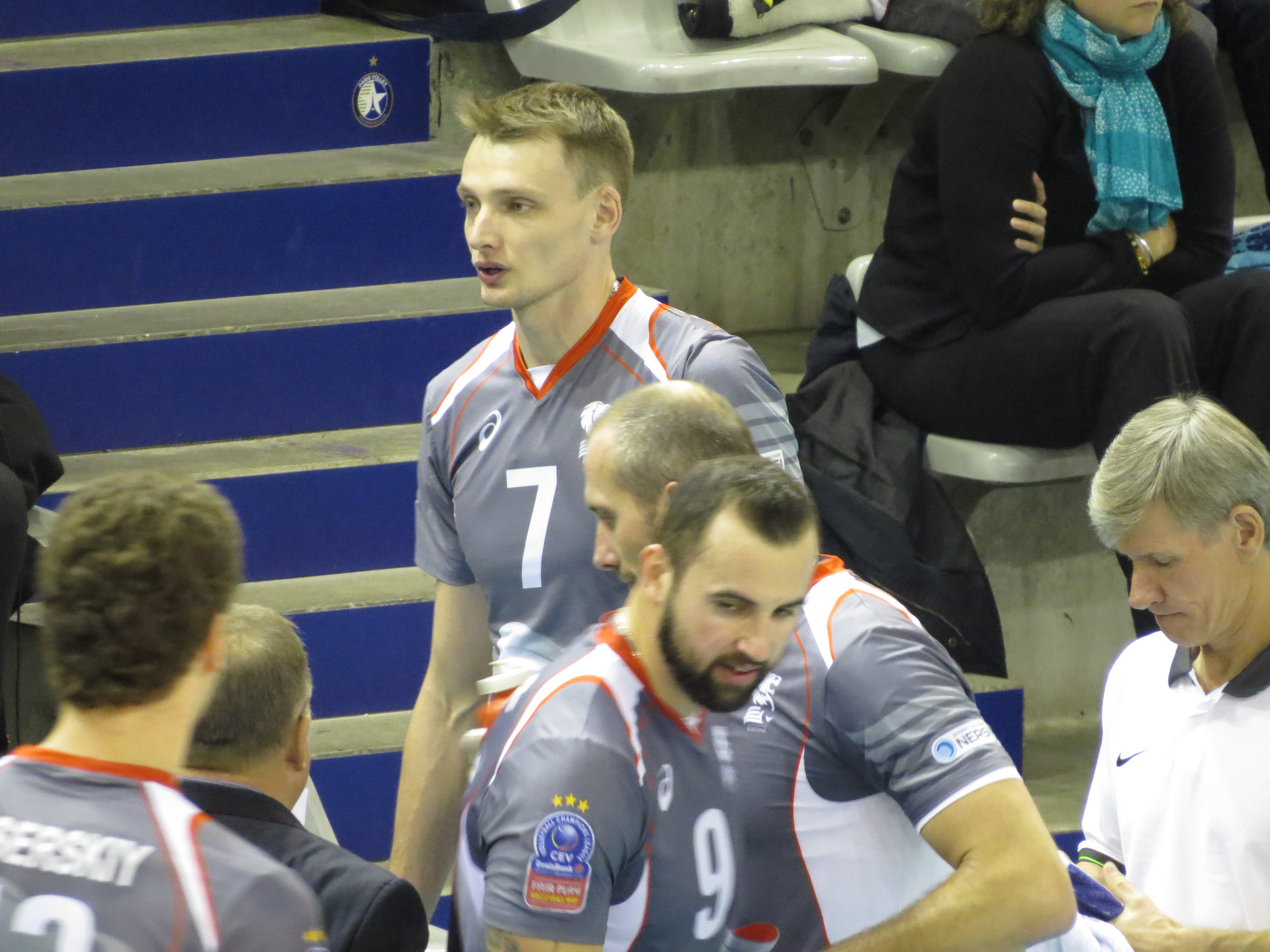

Personal information
- Full name: Artem Grigorevich Smoliar
- Nationality: Russian
- Born: February 4, 1985 (age 41); Horodnia, USSR
- Height: 2.09 m (6 ft 10 in)
- Weight: 97 kg (214 lb)
- Spike: 362 cm (143 in)
- Block: 343 cm (135 in)

Volleyball information
- Position: Setter
- Current club: Lokomotiv Novosibirsk
- Number: 7

Career
Years	Teams
2005–2006; 2006–2007; 2007–2009; 2009–2011; 2011–2012; 2012–2014; 2014–2017; 2017–	Burevisnyk-ShVSM Chernihiv; Belogorie Belgorod; Metalloinvest Stary Oskol; Belogorie Belgorod; Lokomotiv Yekaterinburg; Gazprom-Ugra Surgut; Belogorie Belgorod; Lokomotiv Novosibirsk
- Last updated: 30 December 2017

Artem Smoliar (born 4 February 1985) is a Russian male volleyball player. He is part of the Russia men's national volleyball team. On club level he plays for Belogorie.
