= 2014 FIVB Volleyball Men's Club World Championship =

2014 Men's Club World Championship
Tournament details
- Host country: Brazil
- Dates: 5–10 May
- Teams: 8 (from 5 confederations)
- Venue: 1 (in 1 host city)

Final positions
- Champions: (Russia) Belogorie Belgorod (1st title)

Tournament awards
- MVP: (Russia) Dmitry Muserskiy (BLG)

The 2014 FIVB Volleyball Men's Club World Championship was the 10th edition of the event. It was held in Belo Horizonte, Brazil from 5 to 10 May 2014. The Russian club Belogorie Belgorod won the title for the first time.

== Qualification ==
| Team (Confederation) | Qualified as |
|---|---|
| (Brazil) Sada Cruzeiro (CSV) | Hosts and 2014 South American Champions |
| (Tunisia) Espérance de Tunis (CAVB) | 2014 African Champions |
| (Iran) Matin Varamin (AVC) | 2014 Asian Champions |
| (Russia) Belogorie Belgorod (CEV) | 2014 European Champions |
| (Puerto Rico) Mets de Guaynabo (NORCECA) | 2014 NORCECA Representatives |
| (Argentina) UPCN San Juan (CSV) | 2014 South American Runners-up |
| (Italy) Trentino Diatec (CEV) | Wild Card (4-time World Champions) |
| (Qatar) Al-Rayyan (AVC) | Wild Card (2014 Asian Runners-up) |

== Pools composition ==
| Pool A | Pool B |
|---|---|
| (Brazil) Sada Cruzeiro | (Italy) Trentino Diatec |
| (Russia) Belogorie Belgorod | (Argentina) UPCN San Juan |
| (Iran) Matin Varamin | (Qatar) Al-Rayyan |
| (Puerto Rico) Mets de Guaynabo | (Tunisia) Espérance de Tunis |

== Venue ==
All matches
Belo Horizonte, Brazil
Mineirinho Arena
Capacity: 25,000
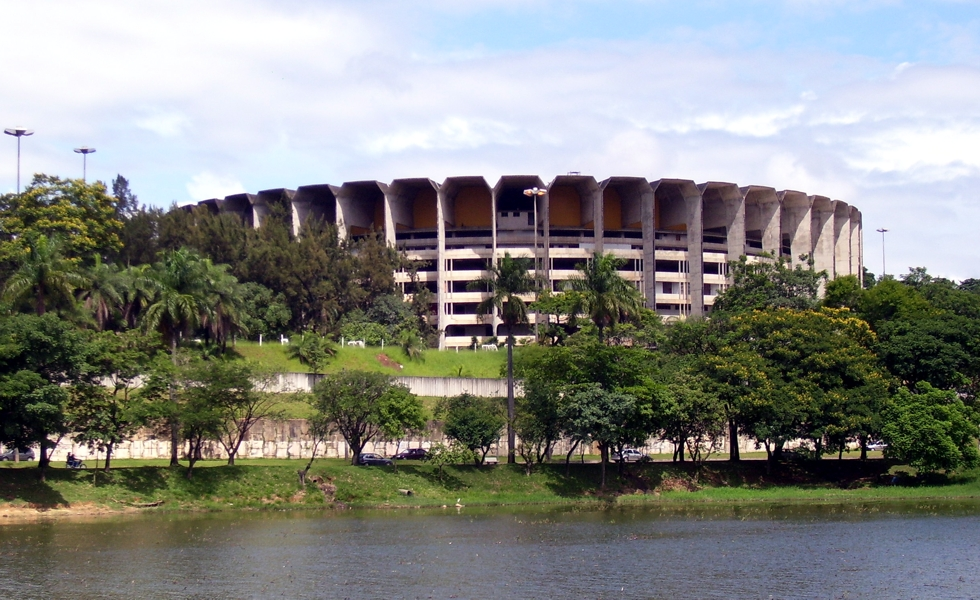

== Pool standing procedure ==
1. Match points
2. Number of matches won
3. Sets ratio
4. Points ratio
5. Result of the last match between the tied teams

Match won 3–0 or 3–1: 3 match points for the winner, 0 match points for the loser
Match won 3–2: 2 match points for the winner, 1 match point for the loser

== Preliminary round ==
- All times are Brasília Time (UTC−03:00).

=== Pool A ===
| Pos | Team | Pld | W | L | Pts | SW | SL | SR | SPW | SPL | SPR | Qualification |
|---|---|---|---|---|---|---|---|---|---|---|---|---|
| 1 | (Russia) Belogorie Belgorod | 3 | 3 | 0 | 9 | 9 | 3 | 3.000 | 299 | 259 | 1.154 | Semifinals |
| 2 | (Brazil) Sada Cruzeiro | 3 | 2 | 1 | 6 | 7 | 3 | 2.333 | 244 | 215 | 1.135 | Semifinals |
| 3 | (Iran) Matin Varamin | 3 | 1 | 2 | 3 | 4 | 6 | 0.667 | 219 | 228 | 0.961 | |
| 4 | (Puerto Rico) Mets de Guaynabo | 3 | 0 | 3 | 0 | 1 | 9 | 0.111 | 187 | 247 | 0.757 | |

| Date | Time | | Score | | Set 1 | Set 2 | Set 3 | Set 4 | Set 5 | Total | Report |
|---|---|---|---|---|---|---|---|---|---|---|---|
| 05 May | 20:00 | Sada Cruzeiro (Brazil) | 3–0 | (Puerto Rico) Mets de Guaynabo | 25–18 | 25–15 | 25–19 | | | 75–52 | P2 P3 |
| 06 May | 17:00 | Belogorie Belgorod (Russia) | 3–1 | (Puerto Rico) Mets de Guaynabo | 25–17 | 25–19 | 22–25 | 25–19 | | 97–80 | P2 P3 |
| 06 May | 20:00 | Sada Cruzeiro (Brazil) | 3–0 | (Iran) Matin Varamin | 25–22 | 25–16 | 25–21 | | | 75–59 | P2 P3 |
| 07 May | 17:10 | Matin Varamin (Iran) | 3–0 | (Puerto Rico) Mets de Guaynabo | 25–18 | 25–19 | 25–18 | | | 75–55 | P2 P3 |
| 07 May | 20:00 | Sada Cruzeiro (Brazil) | 1–3 | (Russia) Belogorie Belgorod | 20–25 | 18–25 | 25–21 | 31–33 | | 94–104 | P2 P3 |
| 08 May | 20:00 | Belogorie Belgorod (Russia) | 3–1 | (Iran) Matin Varamin | 25–21 | 22–25 | 25–15 | 26–24 | | 98–85 | P2 P3 |

=== Pool B ===
| Pos | Team | Pld | W | L | Pts | SW | SL | SR | SPW | SPL | SPR | Qualification |
|---|---|---|---|---|---|---|---|---|---|---|---|---|
| 1 | (Qatar) Al-Rayyan | 3 | 2 | 1 | 7 | 8 | 3 | 2.667 | 254 | 233 | 1.090 | Semifinals |
| 2 | (Argentina) UPCN San Juan | 3 | 2 | 1 | 6 | 8 | 5 | 1.600 | 297 | 284 | 1.046 | Semifinals |
| 3 | (Italy) Trentino Diatec | 3 | 2 | 1 | 5 | 6 | 5 | 1.200 | 266 | 247 | 1.077 | |
| 4 | (Tunisia) Espérance de Tunis | 3 | 0 | 3 | 0 | 0 | 9 | 0.000 | 177 | 230 | 0.770 | |

| Date | Time | | Score | | Set 1 | Set 2 | Set 3 | Set 4 | Set 5 | Total | Report |
|---|---|---|---|---|---|---|---|---|---|---|---|
| 05 May | 14:00 | UPCN San Juan (Argentina) | 3–0 | (Tunisia) Espérance de Tunis | 25–18 | 25–18 | 27–25 | | | 77–61 | P2 P3 |
| 05 May | 17:00 | Trentino Diatec (Italy) | 0–3 | (Qatar) Al-Rayyan | 22–25 | 24–26 | 22–25 | | | 68–76 | P2 P3 |
| 06 May | 14:00 | Al-Rayyan (Qatar) | 3–0 | (Tunisia) Espérance de Tunis | 28–26 | 25–18 | 25–21 | | | 78–65 | P2 P3 |
| 07 May | 14:00 | Trentino Diatec (Italy) | 3–2 | (Argentina) UPCN San Juan | 23–25 | 25–23 | 38–36 | 22–25 | 15–11 | 123–120 | P2 P3 |
| 08 May | 14:00 | UPCN San Juan (Argentina) | 3–2 | (Qatar) Al-Rayyan | 25–19 | 25–20 | 17–25 | 18–25 | 15–11 | 100–100 | P2 P3 |
| 08 May | 17:00 | Trentino Diatec (Italy) | 3–0 | (Tunisia) Espérance de Tunis | 25–16 | 25–19 | 25–16 | | | 75–51 | P2 P3 |

== Final round ==
- All times are Brasília Time (UTC−03:00).

Semifinals
9 May
(Russia) Belgorod | 3
(Argentina) UPCN | 1
9 May
(Qatar) Al-Rayyan | 3
(Brazil) Sada | 1

Final
10 May
(Russia) Belgorod | 3
(Qatar) Al-Rayyan | 1
3rd place match
10 May
(Argentina) UPCN | 3
(Brazil) Sada | 2

=== Semifinals ===
| Date | Time | | Score | | Set 1 | Set 2 | Set 3 | Set 4 | Set 5 | Total | Report |
|---|---|---|---|---|---|---|---|---|---|---|---|
| 09 May | 17:30 | Belogorie Belgorod (Russia) | 3–1 | (Argentina) UPCN San Juan | 19–25 | 25–14 | 25–21 | 25–20 | | 94–80 | P2 P3 |
| 09 May | 20:30 | Al-Rayyan (Qatar) | 3–1 | (Brazil) Sada Cruzeiro | 21–25 | 25–18 | 25–21 | 25–18 | | 96–82 | P2 P3 |

=== 3rd place match ===
| Date | Time | | Score | | Set 1 | Set 2 | Set 3 | Set 4 | Set 5 | Total | Report |
|---|---|---|---|---|---|---|---|---|---|---|---|
| 10 May | 16:30 | UPCN San Juan (Argentina) | 3–2 | (Brazil) Sada Cruzeiro | 25–17 | 31–29 | 23–25 | 16–25 | 15–13 | 110–109 | P2 P3 |

=== Final ===
| Date | Time | | Score | | Set 1 | Set 2 | Set 3 | Set 4 | Set 5 | Total | Report |
|---|---|---|---|---|---|---|---|---|---|---|---|
| 10 May | 19:20 | Belogorie Belgorod (Russia) | 3–1 | (Qatar) Al-Rayyan | 16–25 | 25–21 | 25–21 | 25–15 | | 91–82 | P2 P3 |

== Final standing ==
| Rank | Team |
|---|---|
| 1st place, gold medalist(s) | (Russia) Belogorie Belgorod |
| 2nd place, silver medalist(s) | (Qatar) Al-Rayyan |
| 3rd place, bronze medalist(s) | (Argentina) UPCN San Juan |
| 4 | (Brazil) Sada Cruzeiro |
| 5 | (Iran) Matin Varamin |
| 5 | (Italy) Trentino Diatec |
| 7 | (Tunisia) Espérance de Tunis |
| 7 | (Puerto Rico) Mets de Guaynabo |

2014 Men's Club World Champions

1st title

12–man roster
Aleksandr Kosarev, Taras Khtey (c), Aleksandr Bogomolov, Aleksey Kazakov, Maxim Panteleymonenko, Sergey Tetyukhin, György Grozer, Roman Bragin, Dmitry Muserskiy, Dragan Travica, Dmitriy Ilinikh, Sergey Bagrey
Head coach
Gennady Shipulin

== Awards ==
- Most valuable player
  (Russia) Dmitry Muserskiy (Belogorie Belgorod)
- Best setter
  (Brazil) Raphael Oliveira (Al-Rayyan)
- Best outside spikers
  (Russia) Sergey Tetyukhin (Belogorie Belgorod)
  (Bulgaria) Matey Kaziyski (Al-Rayyan)
- Best middle blockers
  (Cuba) Robertlandy Simón (Al-Rayyan)
  (Brazil) José Santos Júnior (UPCN San Juan)
- Best opposite spiker
  (Brazil) Wallace de Souza (Sada Cruzeiro)
- Best libero
  (Brazil) Alan Domingos (Al-Rayyan)
