= Burevisnyk-ShVSM Chernihiv =

Professional Volleyball club based in Chernihiv, Ukraine

- Nickname(s): Буревісник-ШВСМ Чернігів
- Founded: 1988
- Ground: Chernihiv National Pedagogical University, street Hetman Polubotka, 53, Chernihiv, Ukraine, 14000
- Chairman: Mykola Nosko
- Manager: Volodymyr Borysenko
- League: Ukrainian Men's Volleyball Super League

Burevisnyk-ShVSM Chernihiv (Ukrainian: Буревісник-ШВСМ Чернігів) is a sports volleyball club in the city of Chernihiv, Ukraine, founded in 1988.

== History ==
=== The beginning ===
In 1988, the Burevisnyk team was reorganized and based on the Faculty of Physical Education of the Taras Shevchenko Chernihiv National University. 1998/99 - 2d place in ChU I League. In the season 1992-1993 he got third in the Ukrainian Cup 1992–92. In the 1999/2000 seasons, the bronze medalists were awarded to the ChU medalist of the middle teams of the All-League. 2000/01 - 7th CHU of the middle teams of the whole league. 2001/02 at the meeting of the middle teams of the first league. 2002/03 - 7th of the middle teams of the first league. 2003/04 7 of the middle teams of the whole league. 2004/05 - 8th of the middle teams of the whole league. 2005/06 - 10th of the middle teams of the whole league.

2006/07 Сomе mісce of the middle teams of the whole league. Champions of Ukraine for the middle naval pledges of the III-IV rivniv accreditation. Champion of the VIII Summer Universiade.

2007/08 - 8th of the middle teams of the whole league.

2009/10 Another place of the middle teams of the whole league, the team got the right to go forward in its history in the superlizi. 2012/13 quarter of the middle of the superleague teams. 2013/14 quarter of the middle of the superleague teams. 2014/15 at the event of the middle of the superleague teams. Finalist of the Ukrainian Cup 2015 rock. In the Ukrainian Cup in 2016, the rock "Burevisnik-SHVSM" went up to "Final Chotiryokh", altogether in the fourth month, having lost in the final on the Lokomotyv Kharkiv, and in the match for the third place, against "Dnipro" In the season 2016-17 the team got 5 in Ukrainian Men's Volleyball Super League

=== Recent years (2017–today) ===
In February 2017, the head coach Mykola Petrovych conducted through the financial station for the season In the regular championship "Burevisnyk" took 5 months, according to the travel news for 5–8 months before the tour. Lish in the home Chernigiv tour "Burevisnik" zumіv zumіv sobіtіt 3 peremogi pospіl (all with rakhunka 3–2) and finіshuvati 6 months in the championship

During 2017, to Mykola Grateful, the head coach of Chernihiv was replaced by the 29-year-old Volodymyr Borysenko as head coach, who, at the same time, continued the viconuvati of the bandage and captain of the command. The collective was left at once by a number of pre-recorded gravitars: Ihor Bulakh, Stanislav Azarov, Bohdan Tatarenko, Andriy Chmirov, Maksym Nykolaichuk and Denys Danilov. Behind the words of the head coach, the manager, as if put in front of the team during the season, was to save Superlizia's registration. The team was also acquired by the chairman Roman Nosko in 2017

In the season 2019-2020 the team got into the semifinal of the Ukrainian Cup. In the season 2020–21, the team plays in Ukrainian Men's Volleyball Super League for the 6th season in the row.

In 2021 the club started quite good and made its way to the next round of the Cup of Ukraine. They hosted the first stage of the Ukrainian Volleyball Cup among women's teams of the 2021/22 season in Group B. The local "University-SHVSM" has completed the first stage of the tournament with three victories over TEOSOF-DYUSSH-2 (25:12, 25:20, 25:11), MSK "Dnipro" (25:19, 25:21, 23:25, 26:24) and NUFVSU (25:19, 25:20, 25:22). The captain of the Chernihiv volleyball team "Burevisnyk-SHVSM" Denis Kopych and its head coach Roman Nosko commented on the start of the season and voiced the tasks facing the team for the season.

==== Siege of Chernihiv ====
In 2022 due to the Russian invasion the existence of the VK “Burevisnyk-SHVSM” Chernihiv was threatened. The Volleyball Federation of Ukraine has decided to end the championships among men's and women's teams ahead of schedule. The representative of the Super League Chernihiv "Petrel-SHVSM" finished the season on the last eighth step of the standings. In the 2021/2022 season, "Burevisnyk-SHVSM" played 24 games in the volleyball Super League, and did not earn a single point. As a result, the team was in last place in the standings. According to the head coach of "Burevisnyk-SHVSM" Roman Nosko, the team is quite young, mostly students play. "Some of our guys are just starting to play. All young people. By the end of the season, the game appeared, they expected to beat the team from Vinnytsia and take 7th place to stay in the Super League." According to the head coach of "Burevisnyk-SHVSM", the existence of the team is still in question. It will all depend on when the war ends and on the ability of the city and region to continue to fund the team. "It's not even about salaries. The guys are ready to play for free, all ambitious and enthusiastic. For them, this is a chance to prove themselves. We need money at least for trips and home tours in Chernihiv. The team is ready to play, and we will do everything possible to save it, "said Roman Nosko.

== Facilities ==
The club plays at the SZ CHNPU, located at the Chernihiv National Pedagogical University, in 53 Hetman Polubotko Street Chernihiv.

== Season by season ==
Playoff berth

| Season | Tier | League | Finish | Wins | Losses | Win% | Playoffs | Other competitions | Head coach | Notes |
|---|---|---|---|---|---|---|---|---|---|---|
Burevisnyk-ShVSM Chernihiv
| 2018–19 | 1 | Super League | 8th | 3 | 25 | – | – | First stage Ukrainian Cup | (Ukraine) Mykola Nosko | |
| 2019–20 | 1 | Super League | 7th | 6 | 22 | – | – | First stage Ukrainian Cup | (Ukraine) Mykola Nosko | |
| 2020–21 | 1 | Super League | 8th | 6 | 12 | – | – | First stage Ukrainian Cup | (Ukraine) Mykola Nosko | |
| 2021–22 | 1 | Super League | 8th | 0 | 24 | – | – | First stage Ukrainian Cup | (Ukraine) Mykola Nosko | |
| 2022–23 | 2 | Vyshcha Liha | | | | – | – | First stage Ukrainian Cup | (Ukraine) Mykola Nosko | |

== Managers ==
- (Ukraine) Mykola Blahodarnyy - 2007–2017
- (Ukraine) Volodymyr Borysenko - 2017–2018
- (Ukraine) Roman Nosko - 2018–present

== Notable players ==
- (Russia) Artem Smoliar - 2005–2006
- (Russia) Kirill Piun - 2007–2013
- (Ukraine) Dmytro Burma - 2018–2020

== Honours ==
=== Domestic ===
- Ukrainian Volleyball Cup

Runners-up (1): 1992-1993
Runners-up (1): 2015-2016
