= Sergey Antipkin =

Russian volleyball player (born 1986)

Personal information
- Full name: Sergey Antipkin
- Nationality: Russian
- Born: March 28, 1986 (age 40); Moscow, Russia, USSR
- Height: 1.97 m (6 ft 6 in)
- Weight: 92 kg (203 lb)
- Spike: 335 cm (132 in)
- Block: 323 cm (127 in)

Volleyball information
- Position: Setter
- Current club: Fakel Novy Urengoy
- Number: 9

Career
Years	Teams
2007–2008; 2008–2009; 2009–2013; 2013–2015; 2015–2016; 2016–2018; 2018–2019; 2019–	Spartak Moscow; Fakel Novy Urengoy; Terek Grozny; Gazprom-Ugra Surgut; Belogorie Belgorod; Dinamo Moscow; Zenit Saint Petersburg; Fakel

National team
2013–2017	Russia
Honours
Men's volleyball
Representing Russia
Summer Universiade
Gold medal – first place	2013 Kazan
- Last updated: 28 December 2020

Sergey Antipkin (born 28 March 1986) is a Russian volleyball player, a member of Russia men's national volleyball team and Russian club Fakel Novy Urengoy.

== Personal life ==
He was born in Moscow. He graduated Institute of World Economy and International Relations in Moscow with a degree in financial management.

== Career ==
In 2015 went to Russian club Belogorie Belgorod.
