= Matey Kaziyski =

Bulgarian volleyball player

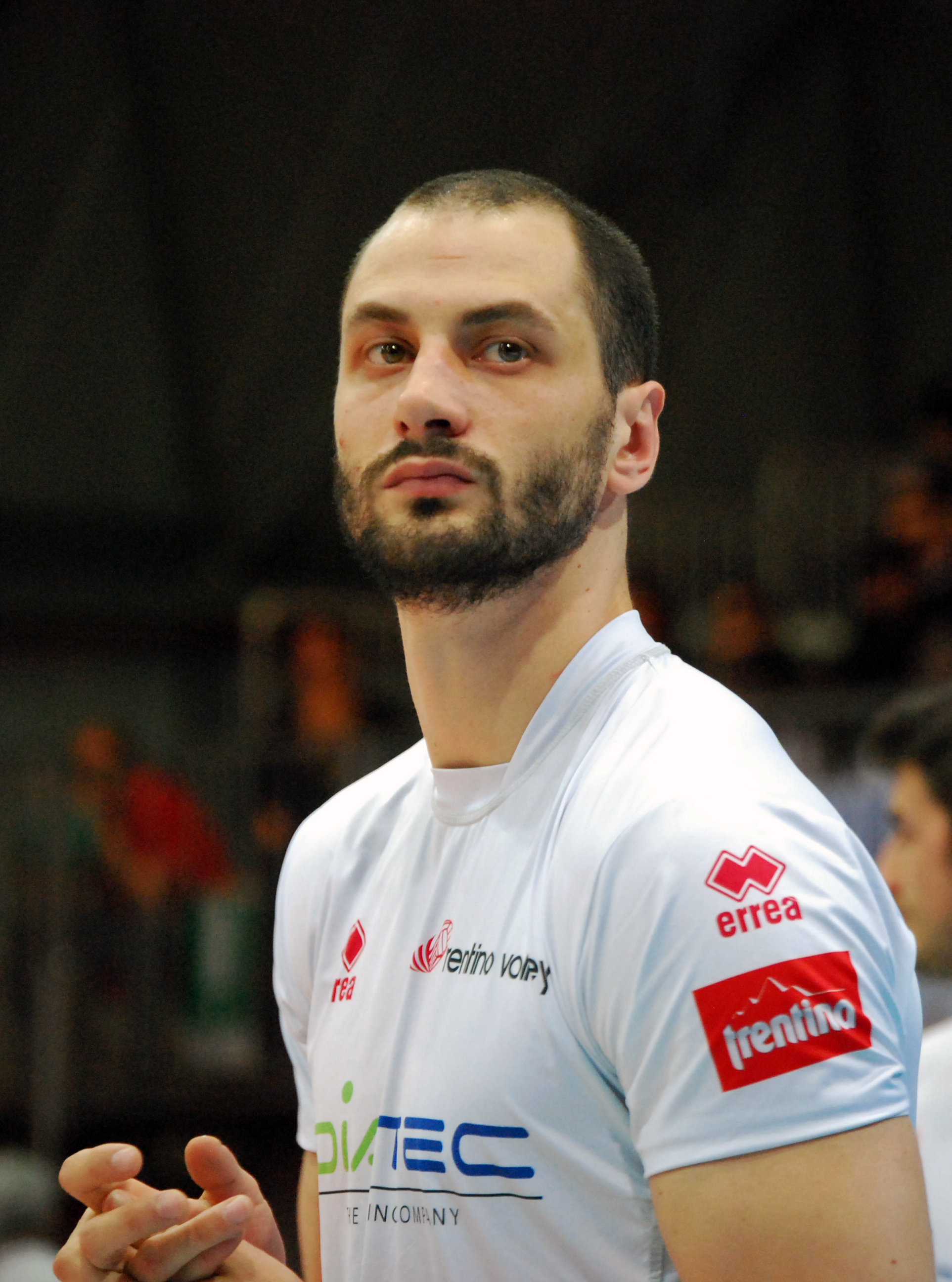

Personal information
- Full name: Matey Iliyanov Kaziyski
- Nickname: The Emperor
- Nationality: (Bulgaria) Bulgarian
- Born: 23 September 1984 (age 42); Sofia, Bulgaria
- Height: 2.02 m (6 ft 8 in)
- Weight: 93 kg (205 lb)
- Spike: 390 cm (154 in)
- Block: 340 cm (134 in)

Volleyball information
- Position: Outside hitter
- Current club: (Italy) Power Volley Milano
- Number: 1

Career
Years	Teams
2002–2004; 2004–2005; 2005–2007; 2007–2013; 2013; 2013–2014; 2014; 2014–2015; 2015–2016; 2016; 2016–2018; 2018; 2018–2019; 2019–2020; 2020–2021; 2021–2023; 2023 –2025; 2025; 2025–	(Bulgaria) Lukoil Neftohimik Burgas (Bulgaria) Slavia Sofia (Russia) Dynamo Moscow (Italy) Trentino Volley (Qatar) Al Rayyan (Turkey) Halkbank Ankara (Qatar) Al Rayyan (Italy) Trentino Volley (Japan) JTEKT Stings (Italy) Trentino Volley (Japan) JTEKT Stings (Poland) Stocznia Szczecin (Italy) Calzedonia Verona (Japan) JTEKT Stings (Italy) Calzedonia Verona (Italy) Trentino Volley (Italy) Allianz Milano (Bulgaria) Lokomotiv Avia (Turkey) Halkbank Ankara

National team
2003–2012	Bulgaria
Honours
Men's volleyball
Representing Bulgaria
FIVB World Championship
Bronze medal – third place	2006 Japan
FIVB World Cup
Bronze medal – third place	2007 Japan
CEV European Championship
Bronze medal – third place	2009 Turkey

Matey Iliyanov Kaziyski (Bulgarian: Матей Илиянов Казийски; born 23 September 1984) is a Bulgarian professional volleyball player, member of Bulgaria men's national volleyball team during 2003–2012 and Italian club Trentino Volley, a participant of the Olympic Games Beijing 2008, bronze medalist of the World Championship 2006, World Cup 2007 and European Championship 2009. He is a multiple winner of the CEV Champions League and FIVB Volleyball Men's Club World Championship with the Italian club Trentino Volley.

== Personal life ==
Kaziyski was born in Sofia. His parents were volleyball players in Bulgarian national teams. As a child he trained different sports like football, basketball and horse riding. Kaziyski is dating Elisabetta Farrugio, former Miss Trento. In 2017 their son Aleksander was born.

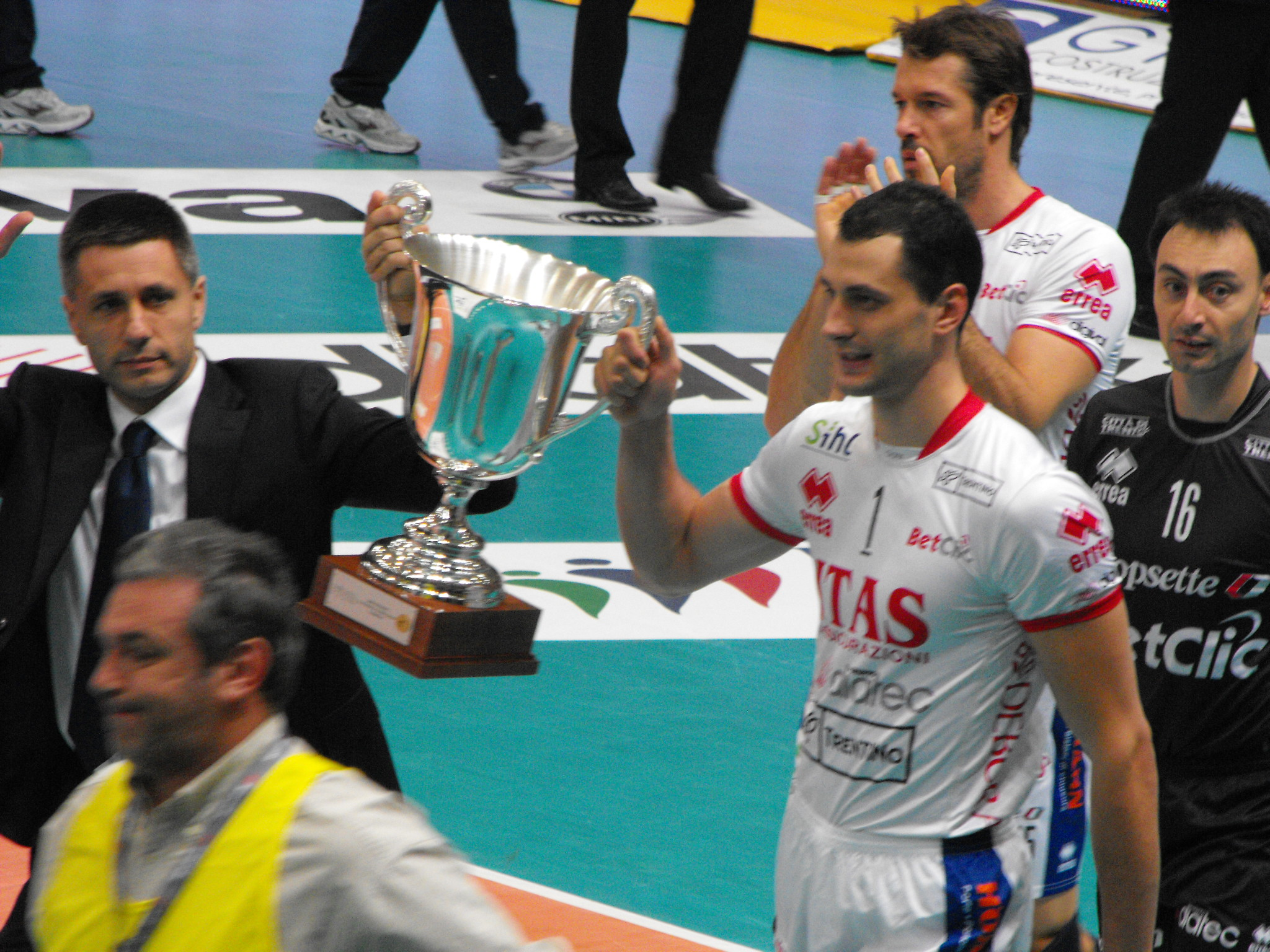
During the match Trentino Volley-PGE Skra Bełchatów, winner gold medalist FIVB Club World Championship 2009

== Career ==
=== Clubs ===
Kaziyski and Radostin Stoychev have been working together since 2004 in the clubs of Slavia Sofia, Dynamo Moscow, Halkbank Ankara and Trentino. Between 2008 and 2015, the Bulgarian won fifteen titles with Trentino, including four Italian Championship titles, three CEV Champions League titles and four Club World Championship titles. In 2015 he left Trentino Volley to play in the Japanese top championship. In the 2016 season, he returned to Trentino.

=== National team ===
Kaziyski with Bulgaria team won the bronze medal in the 2006 World Championship, ranking fifth among the most productive scorers in the championship and receiving the best server award. In 2012 Kaziyski left the Bulgaria men's national volleyball team, together with coach Radostin Stoytchev, due to a scandal with Bulgarian Volleyball Federation (BFV). The player said he would not get back, until the leadership and structure of the BFV is changed.

== Sporting achievements ==
=== Clubs ===
- CEV Champions League
  - 2008/2009 – with Itas Diatec Trentino
  - 2009/2010 – with Itas Diatec Trentino
  - 2010/2011 – with Itas Diatec Trentino
- FIVB Club World Championship
  - Doha 2009 – with Itas Diatec Trentino
  - Doha 2010 – with Itas Diatec Trentino
  - Doha 2011 – with Itas Diatec Trentino
  - Doha 2012 – with Itas Diatec Trentino
  - Betim 2021 – with Itas Trentino
  - Betim 2022 – with Trentino Itas
- National championships
  - 2004/2005 Bulgarian Cup, with Slavia Sofia
  - 2005/2006 Russian Cup, with Dynamo Moscow
  - 2005/2006 Russian Championship, with Dynamo Moscow
  - 2007/2008 Italian Championship, with Itas Diates Trentino
  - 2009/2010 Italian Cup, with Itas Diates Trentino
  - 2010/2011 Italian Championship, with Itas Diates Trentino
  - 2011/2012 Italian SuperCup, with Itas Diates Trentino
  - 2011/2012 Italian Cup, with Itas Diates Trentino
  - 2012/2013 Italian Championship, with Itas Diates Trentino
  - 2012/2013 Italian Cup, with Itas Diates Trentino
  - 2012/2013 Emir Cup, with Al Rayyan
  - 2013/2014 Turkish SuperCup, with Halkbank Ankara
  - 2013/2014 Turkish Cup, with Halkbank Ankara
  - 2013/2014 Turkish Championship, with Halkbank Ankara
  - 2014/2015 Italian Championship, with Trentino Volley
  - 2021/2022 Italian SuperCup, with Itas Trentino
  - 2022/2023 Italian Cup, with Itas Trentino
  - 2022/2023 Italian Championship, with Itas Trentino

=== Individual awards ===
- 2004 FIVB World League – Best server
- 2006 FIVB World League – Best spiker
- 2006 FIVB World Championship – Best server
- 2007 CEV Champions League – Best server
- 2008 Italian Championship Final – Most valuable player
- 2009 CEV Champions League – Most valuable player
- 2009 FIVB Club World Championship – Best spiker
- 2009 FIVB Club World Championship – Most valuable player
- 2010 Interior Ministry – Man of Year Bulgaria
- 2011 CEV Champions League – Best spiker
- 2011 FIVB Club World Championship – Best server
- 2014 CEV Champions League – Best receiver
- 2014 FIVB Club World Championship – Best outside spiker
- 2022 FIVB Club World Championship – Best opposite

=== Record ===
- 132 km/h spike speed

Awards
Preceded by (Serbia and Montenegro) Andrija Gerić	Best Server of FIVB World League; 2004	Succeeded by (Serbia and Montenegro) Ivan Miljkovic
Preceded by (Cuba) Henry Bell Cisnero	Best Spiker of FIVB World League; 2006	Succeeded by (Russia) Yury Berezhko
Preceded by (France) Franz Granvorka	Best Server of FIVB World Championship; 2006	Succeeded by (United States) Clayton Stanley
Preceded by (Italy) Alessandro Fei	Best Server of CEV Champions League; 2006/2007	Succeeded by (Brazil) Joao Paulo Bravo
Preceded by (United States) Clayton Stanley	Most Valuable Player of CEV Champions League; 2008/2009	Succeeded by (Cuba) Osmany Juantorena
Preceded by (Italy) Lorenzo Bernardi (1992)	Most Valuable Player of FIVB Club World Championship; 2009	Succeeded by (Cuba) Osmany Juantorena
Preceded by -	Best Spiker of FIVB Club World Championship; 2009	Succeeded by (Cuba) Osmany Juantorena
Preceded by (Brazil) Dante Amaral	Best Spiker of CEV Champions League; 2010/2011	Succeeded by (Poland) Bartosz Kurek
Preceded by (Argentina) Luciano De Cecco	Best Server of FIVB Club World Championship; 2011	Succeeded by (Brazil) Wallace de Souza
Preceded by (Russia) Yury Berezhko	Best Receiver of CEV Champions League; 2013/2014	Succeeded by -
Preceded by (Cuba) Yoandy Leal (Slovakia) Lukáš Diviš	Best Outside Spiker of FIVB Club World Championship; 2014 ex aequo (Russia) Sergey Tetyukhin	Succeeded by (Cuba) Wilfredo León (Bulgaria) Todor Aleksiev
