= Mohamed Al Hachdadi =

Moroccan volleyball player (born 1991)

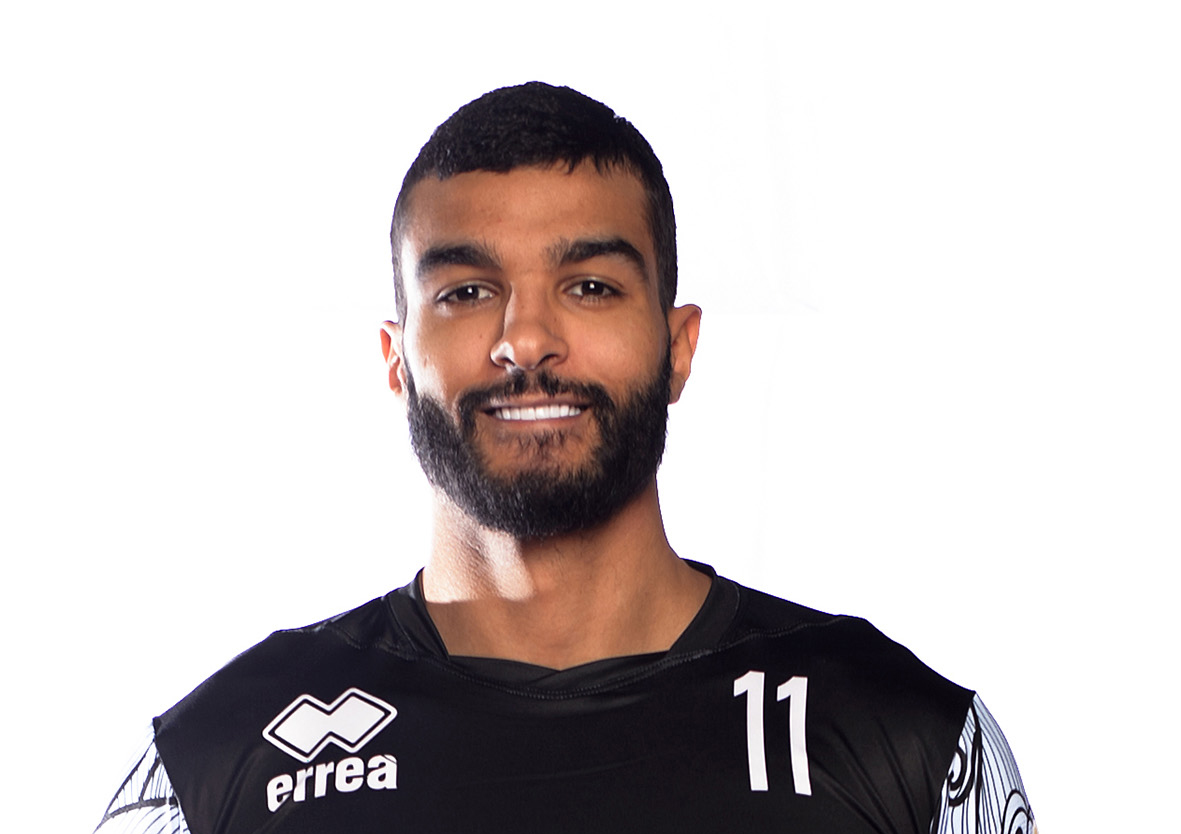

Personal information
- Nickname: Momo, Mo
- Nationality: (Morocco) Moroccan
- Born: 2 February 1991 (age 35); Mohammedia, Morocco
- Height: 1.98 m (6 ft 6 in)
- Weight: 90 kg (198 lb)
- Spike: 345 cm (136 in)
- Block: 325 cm (128 in)

Volleyball information
- Position: Opposite

Career
Years	Teams
2011–2013; 2013–2015; 2015–2016; 2016; 2016–2017; 2017–2018; 2018–2019; 2019–2020; 2020–2021; 2021–2022; 2023–2024	(Qatar) Al Ahli Doha (Qatar) Al Rayyan (Finland) Hurrikaani Loimaa (Turkey) Halkbank Ankara (South Korea) Ansan OK Savings Bank (France) Stade Poitevin Poitiers (Italy) Volley Callipo (Brazil) Vôlei Taubaté (Poland) Jastrzębski Węgiel (Russia) Belogorie Belgorod (Indonesia) Palembang Bank Sumsel Babel

National team
Morocco
Honours
Men's volleyball
Representing Morocco
CAVB African Championship
Bronze medal – third place	2015 Cairo

Mohamed Al Hachdadi (born 2 February 1991) is a Moroccan volleyball player, member of the Morocco men's national volleyball team. 2021 Polish Champion. With his club, Al Rayyan, he competed at the 2014 Club World Championship held in Brazil.

== Sporting achievements ==
=== Clubs ===
- FIVB Club World Championship
  - Belo Horizonte 2014 – with Al Rayyan
- AVC Asian Club Championship
  - Pasay 2014 – with Al Rayyan
- National championships
  - 2013/2014 Qatari Championship, with Al Rayyan
  - 2014/2015 Qatari Championship, with Al Rayyan
  - 2019/2020 Brazilian SuperCup, with Vôlei Taubaté
  - 2020/2021 Polish Championship, with Jastrzębski Węgiel

=== Individual awards ===
- 2015: CAVB African Championship – Best Spiker
- 2021: CAVB African Championship – Most Valuable Player
