= Dmitry Muserskiy =

Russian volleyball player

Dmitriy Muserskiy
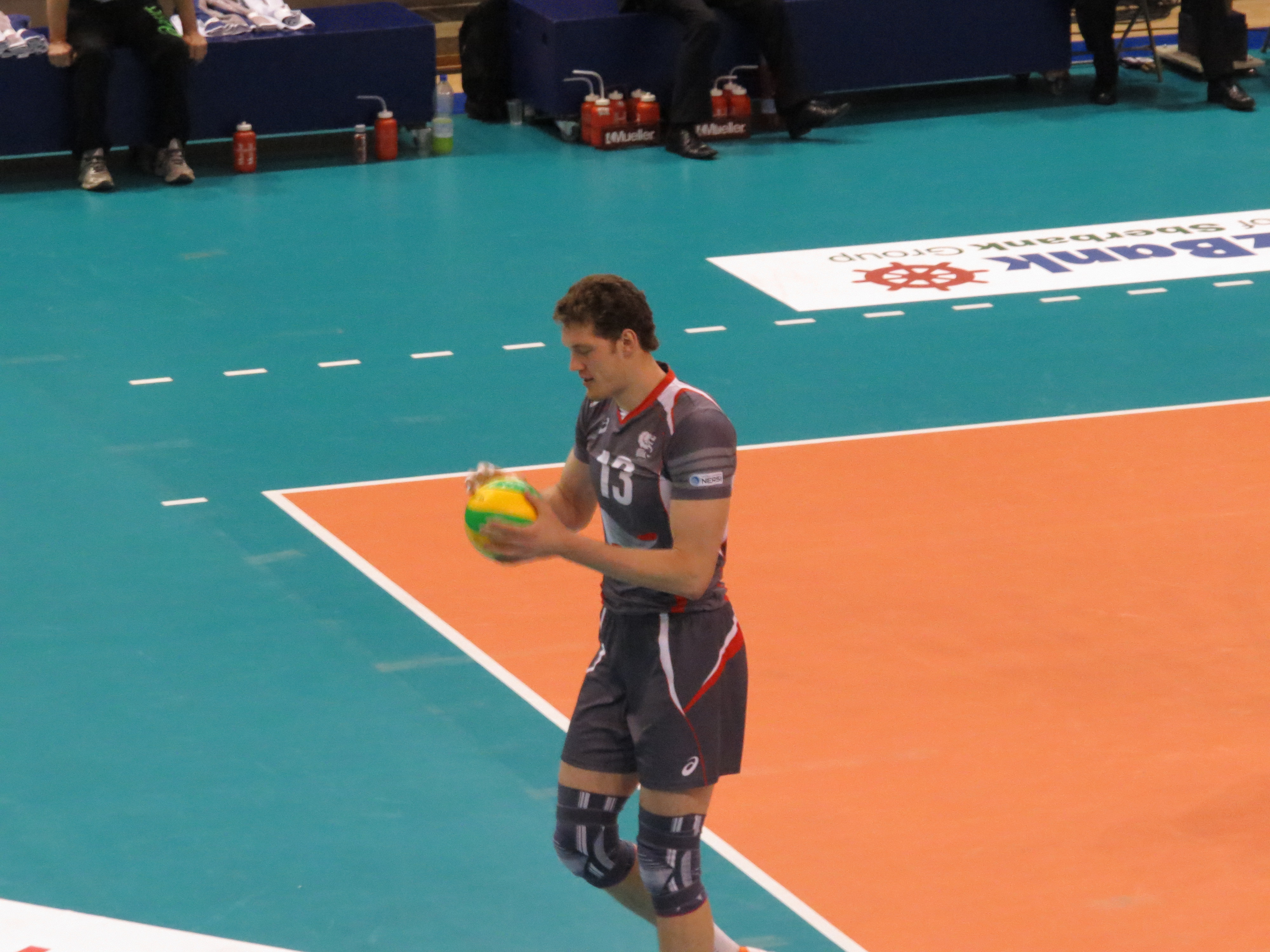

Personal information
- Full name: Dmitry Aleksandrovich Muserskiy
- Nickname: Dima, Small boy, Sir
- Nationality: (Ukraine) Ukrainian (Russia) Russian
- Born: 29 October 1988 (age 38); Makiivka, Soviet Union, Ukraine
- Height: 2.18 m (7 ft 2 in)
- Weight: 105 kg (231 lb)
- Spike: 375 cm (148 in)
- Block: 365 cm (144 in)

Volleyball information
- Position: Middle blocker / Opposite
- Current club: Suntory Sunbirds
- Number: 13

Career
Years	Teams
1996–2005; 2005–2008; 2008; 2008–2018; 2018–	Yurydychna Akademiya; Belogorie Belgorod; Metalloinvest Stary Oskol; Belogorie Belgorod; Suntory Sunbirds

National team
2010–	Russia (132)
Honours
Men's volleyball
Representing Russia
Olympic Games
Gold medal – first place	2012 London
FIVB World Cup
Gold medal – first place	2011 Japan
FIVB World Grand Champions Cup
Silver medal – second place	2013 Japan
FIVB World League
Gold medal – first place	2011 Gdansk
Gold medal – first place	2013 Mar del Plata
Silver medal – second place	2010 Córdoba
FIVB Nations League
Gold medal – first place	2018 Lille
CEV European Championship
Gold medal – first place	2013 Copenhagen

Dmitry Aleksandrovich Muserskiy (Russian: Дмитрий Александрович Мусэрский) (born 29 October 1988) is a Russian volleyball player of Ukrainian descent, member of the Russian national team and Japanese club, Suntory Sunbirds. 2012 Olympic Champion, 2011 World Cup winner, 2013 European Champion, and multiple World League medallist. Muserskiy is among the world's tallest athletes.

== Career ==
Muserskiy began playing volleyball at the age of 8 under the guidance of Boris Osnach. In 2006 Muserskiy defended the colors of the junior national team. On 4 June 2010 in Yekaterinburg, in his first match for the Russian national team against USA in the FIVB World League Muserskiy scored 13 points and became the best scorer of the Russian team that day. In 2011, with his national team, he won the FIVB World League and the FIVB World Cup.

Muserskiy was banned from the sport for nine months in 2021, for doping violations he admitted to dating back to 2013.

== Personal life ==
Muserskiy was born in Makiivka, Ukraine, Soviet Union. He gained Russian citizenship in 2006. In February 2015, his wife gave birth to their son, Roman.

== Sporting achievements ==
=== Clubs ===
- FIVB Club World Championship
  - Belo Horizonte 2014 – with Belogorie Belgorod
  - Bangalore 2023 – with Suntory Sunbirds
- CEV Champions League
  - 2013/2014 – with Belogorie Belgorod
- CEV Cup
  - 2008/2009 – with Belogorie Belgorod
  - 2017/2018 – with Belogorie Belgorod
- AVC Champions League
  - 2022 – with Suntory Sunbirds
  - 2023 – with Suntory Sunbirds
  - 2025 – with Suntory Sunbirds
- National championships
  - 2012/2013 Russian Cup, with Belogorie Belgorod
  - 2012/2013 Russian Championship, with Belogorie Belgorod
  - 2013/2014 Russian SuperCup, with Belogorie Belgorod
  - 2013/2014 Russian Cup, with Belogorie Belgorod
  - 2014/2015 Russian SuperCup, with Belogorie Belgorod
  - 2020/2021 Japanese Championship, with Suntory Sunbirds
  - 2021/2022 Japanese Championship, with Suntory Sunbirds

=== Individual awards ===
- 2010: FIVB World League – Best middle blocker
- 2011: FIVB World League – Best server
- 2013: FIVB World League – Best middle blocker
- 2013: CEV European Championship – Most valuable player
- 2013: FIVB World Grand Champions Cup – Most valuable player
- 2014: CEV Champions League – Best middle blocker
- 2014: FIVB Club World Championship – Most valuable player
- 2018: FIVB Nations League – Best middle blocker
- 2022: Asian Club Volleyball Championship – Best opposite spiker
- 2023: Japan V.League Division 1 – Best SIX & Fighting spirit award
- 2023: Kurowashiki tournament – Fighting spirit award & Best SIX
- 2023: Asian Club Volleyball Championship – Most valuable player
- 2023: FIVB Club Volleyball Championship – Best opposite spiker

Awards
Preceded by (Cuba) Robertlandy Simón	Best Blocker of FIVB World League; 2010	Succeeded by (Russia) Maxim Mikhaylov
Preceded by (Serbia) Ivan Miljković	Most Valuable Player of CEV European Championship; 2013	Succeeded by (France) Antonin Rouzier
Preceded by (United States) David Lee	Best Blocker of CEV Champions League; 2013/2014	Succeeded by (Poland) Piotr Nowakowski (Netherlands) Rob Bontje
Preceded by (Brazil) Wallace de Souza	Most Valuable Player of FIVB Club World Championship; 2014	Succeeded by (Cuba) Yoandy Leal
Preceded by FIVB World League	Best Middle Blocker of FIVB Nations League; 2018	Succeeded by (United States) Maxwell Holt (Russia) Ivan Iakovlev
