= 2013–14 CEV Champions League =

- League: CEV Champions League
- Sport: Volleyball
- Duration: 22 October 2013 – 22 March 2014
- Teams: 28

Finals
- Venue: (Turkey) Ankara
- Champions: (Russia) Belogorie Belgorod
- Finals MVP: (Russia) Sergey Tetyukhin

CEV Champions League seasons
- ← 2012–13 2014–15 →

The 2013–14 CEV Champions League was the 55th edition of the highest level European volleyball club competition organised by the European Volleyball Confederation.

== Participating teams ==
Rank	Country	Number of teams	Teams
1	Italy	3	Diatec Trentino; Copra Elior Piacenza; Lube Banca Marche Macerata
2	Poland	3	Asseco Resovia; ZAKSA Kędzierzyn-Koźle; Jastrzębski Węgiel
3	Russia	3	Belogorie Belgorod; Zenit Kazan; Lokomotiv Novosibirsk
4	Belgium	2	Knack Roeselare; Noliko Maaseik
5	Turkey	3	Arkas İzmir; Halkbank Ankara; Galatasaray İstanbul
6	France	2	Tours VB; Paris Volley
7	Germany	2	Berlin Recycling Volleys; VfB Friedrichshafen
8	Greece	1	Olympiacos Piraeus
9	Slovenia	1	ACH Volley Ljubljana
10	Austria	2	Posojilnica Aich/Dob; Hypo Tirol Innsbruck
12	Romania	1	Tomis Constanța
14	Montenegro	1	Budvanska Rivijera Budva
15	Bulgaria	1	Marek Union-Ivkoni Dupnitsa
16	Czech Republic	2	VK Ostrava; Jihostroj České Budějovice
17	Switzerland	1	Energy Investments Lugano

== League round ==
28 teams have been drawn to 7 pools of 4 teams each.

In each pool, the competition is organised on the basis of a double round-robin system. Each team will thus play 6 matches: twice against each opponent.

Points are awarded as follows:

- 3 points for a 3:0 or 3:1 victory;
- 2 points for a 3:2 victory;
- 1 point for a 2:3 defeat;
- 0 points for a 1:3 or 0:3 defeat.

In case two or more teams finish with an equal number of points, they will be ranked on the basis of the following criteria:

- number of matches won;
- set quotient (the number of total sets won divided by the number of total sets lost);
- points quotient (the number of total points scored divided by the number of total points lost);
- results of head-to-head matches between the teams in question.

12 teams will qualify for the Playoff 12:

- the winner of each pool, and
- 5 second-ranked teams with the best score.

After the end of the League Round, the organizer of the Final Four will be determined. That team will qualify directly for the Final Four. It will be replaced in Playoff 12 by the next best second-ranked team.

The remaining second-ranked team as well 3 third-ranked teams with the best score will move to the Challenge Round of the CEV Cup.

The remaining third-ranked and all fourth-ranked teams will be eliminated.

- All times are local.

=== Pool A ===
Pos	Team	Pld	W	L	Pts	SW	SL	SR	SPW	SPL	SPR	Qualification
1	(Italy) Copra Elior Piacenza	6	5	1	16	17	5	3.400	519	454	1.143	Playoffs
2	(France) Tours VB	6	5	1	13	15	8	1.875	533	483	1.104	Playoffs
3	(Slovenia) ACH Volley Ljubljana	6	1	5	4	8	15	0.533	498	541	0.921	
4	(Bulgaria) Marek Union-Ivkoni Dupnitsa	6	1	5	3	3	15	0.200	373	445	0.838	

Date	Time		Score		Set 1	Set 2	Set 3	Set 4	Set 5	Total	Report
23 Oct	20:30	Copra Elior Piacenza (Italy)	3–1	(Slovenia) ACH Volley Ljubljana	25–18	24–26	25–14	25–23		99–81	Report
24 Oct	20:00	Marek Union-Ivkoni (Bulgaria)	0–3	(France) Tours VB	23–25	21–25	23–25			67–75	Report
29 Oct	18:00	ACH Volley Ljubljana (Slovenia)	3–0	(Bulgaria) Marek Union-Ivkoni	27–25	25–18	25–17			77–60	Report
30 Oct	20:30	Tours VB (France)	3–2	(Italy) Copra Elior Piacenza	25–19	27–29	25–13	22–25	15–10	114–96	Report
5 Nov	18:00	ACH Volley Ljubljana (Slovenia)	1–3	(France) Tours VB	25–23	26–28	21–25	17–25		89–101	Report
7 Nov	20:30	Copra Elior Piacenza (Italy)	3–0	(Bulgaria) Marek Union-Ivkoni	25–15	25–21	26–24			76–60	Report
4 Dec	20:30	Tours VB (France)	3–2	(Slovenia) ACH Volley Ljubljana	26–24	22–25	25–21	21–25	15–7	109–102	Report
5 Dec	20:00	Marek Union-Ivkoni (Bulgaria)	0–3	(Italy) Copra Elior Piacenza	24–26	19–25	14–25			57–76	Report
12 Dec	17:00	Marek Union-Ivkoni (Bulgaria)	3–0	(Slovenia) ACH Volley Ljubljana	25–22	25–21	25–23			75–66	Report
12 Dec	20:30	Copra Elior Piacenza (Italy)	3–0	(France) Tours VB	25–14	25–22	25–23			75–59	Report
18 Dec	20:30	Tours VB (France)	3–0	(Bulgaria) Marek Union-Ivkoni	25–17	25–15	25–22			75–54	Report
18 Dec	20:30	ACH Volley Ljubljana (Slovenia)	1–3	(Italy) Copra Elior Piacenza	25–22	21–25	15–25	22–25		83–97	Report

=== Pool B ===
Pos	Team	Pld	W	L	Pts	SW	SL	SR	SPW	SPL	SPR	Qualification
1	(Russia) Belogorie Belgorod	6	6	0	18	18	0	MAX	456	348	1.310	Playoffs
2	(Belgium) Noliko Maaseik	6	3	3	9	10	9	1.111	439	420	1.045	Playoffs
3	(Greece) Olympiacos Piraeus	6	3	3	9	9	11	0.818	460	483	0.952	2013–14 CEV Cup
4	(Czech Republic) VK Ostrava	6	0	6	0	1	18	0.056	373	477	0.782	

Date	Time		Score		Set 1	Set 2	Set 3	Set 4	Set 5	Total	Report
22 Oct	20:00	VK Ostrava (Czech Republic)	1–3	(Greece) Olympiacos Piraeus	25–22	22–25	22–25	20–25		89–97	Report
23 Oct	19:00	Belogorie Belgorod (Russia)	3–0	(Belgium) Noliko Maaseik	25–22	25–11	25–18			75–51	Report
29 Oct	20:30	Noliko Maaseik (Belgium)	3–0	(Czech Republic) VK Ostrava	25–10	25–20	25–15			75–45	Report
30 Oct	18:00	Olympiacos Piraeus (Greece)	0–3	(Russia) Belogorie Belgorod	19–25	21–25	25–27			65–77	Report
5 Nov	20:00	VK Ostrava (Czech Republic)	0–3	(Russia) Belogorie Belgorod	19–25	27–29	18–25			64–79	Report
6 Nov	18:00	Olympiacos Piraeus (Greece)	3–1	(Belgium) Noliko Maaseik	28–26	25–22	23–25	25–23		101–96	Report
3 Dec	19:00	Belogorie Belgorod (Russia)	3–0	(Czech Republic) VK Ostrava	25–15	25–20	25–16			75–51	Report
3 Dec	20:30	Noliko Maaseik (Belgium)	3–0	(Greece) Olympiacos Piraeus	25–18	31–29	25–18			81–65	Report
10 Dec	20:00	VK Ostrava (Czech Republic)	0–3	(Belgium) Noliko Maaseik	18–25	18–25	23–25			59–75	Report
11 Dec	19:00	Belogorie Belgorod (Russia)	3–0	(Greece) Olympiacos Piraeus	25–15	25–23	25–18			75–56	Report
18 Dec	18:00	Olympiacos Piraeus (Greece)	3–0	(Czech Republic) VK Ostrava	25–20	25–21	26–24			76–65	Report
18 Dec	20:30	Noliko Maaseik (Belgium)	0–3	(Russia) Belogorie Belgorod	22–25	21–25	18–25			61–75	Report

=== Pool C ===
Pos	Team	Pld	W	L	Pts	SW	SL	SR	SPW	SPL	SPR	Qualification
1	(Poland) Asseco Resovia	6	4	2	13	14	7	2.000	502	449	1.118	Playoffs
2	(Montenegro) Budvanska Rivijera Budva	6	4	2	12	14	9	1.556	530	488	1.086	Playoffs
3	(France) Paris Volley	6	4	2	11	12	9	1.333	483	476	1.015	2013–14 CEV Cup
4	(Czech Republic) Jihostroj České Budějovice	6	0	6	0	3	18	0.167	421	523	0.805	

Date	Time		Score		Set 1	Set 2	Set 3	Set 4	Set 5	Total	Report
24 Oct	18:00	Budvanska Rivijera Budva (Montenegro)	3–0	(Czech Republic) České Budějovice	25–18	25–18	25–15			75–51	Report
24 Oct	20:30	Paris Volley (France)	0–3	(Poland) Asseco Resovia	20–25	26–28	11–25			57–78	Report
29 Oct	20:00	České Budějovice (Czech Republic)	1–3	(France) Paris Volley	18–25	23–25	25–21	29–31		95–102	Report
30 Oct	18:00	Asseco Resovia (Poland)	2–3	(Montenegro) Budvanska Rivijera Budva	23–25	26–28	25–23	25–20	12–15	111–111	Report
6 Nov	20:30	Asseco Resovia (Poland)	3–1	(Czech Republic) České Budějovice	25–22	22–25	25–16	25–16		97–79	Report
7 Nov	20:30	Paris Volley (France)	3–0	(Montenegro) Budvanska Rivijera Budva	27–25	25–16	25–19			77–60	Report
4 Dec	20:00	České Budějovice (Czech Republic)	0–3	(Poland) Asseco Resovia	18–25	24–26	19–25			61–76	Report
5 Dec	18:00	Budvanska Rivijera Budva (Montenegro)	2–3	(France) Paris Volley	26–28	22–25	25–12	27–25	12–15	112–105	Report
11 Dec	20:30	Paris Volley (France)	3–0	(Czech Republic) České Budějovice	25–13	25–19	26–24			76–56	Report
12 Dec	18:00	Budvanska Rivijera Budva (Montenegro)	3–0	(Poland) Asseco Resovia	25–22	25–21	25–22			75–65	Report
18 Dec	18:00	České Budějovice (Czech Republic)	1–3	(Montenegro) Budvanska Rivijera Budva	20–25	25–22	16–25	18–25		79–97	Report
18 Dec	20:30	Asseco Resovia (Poland)	3–0	(France) Paris Volley	25–20	25–23	25–23			75–66	Report

=== Pool D ===
Pos	Team	Pld	W	L	Pts	SW	SL	SR	SPW	SPL	SPR	Qualification
1	(Italy) Diatec Trentino	6	5	1	15	15	4	3.750	454	374	1.214	Playoffs
2	(Germany) Berlin Recycling Volleys	6	5	1	15	16	5	3.200	513	428	1.199	Playoffs
3	(Switzerland) Energy Investments Lugano	6	2	4	4	7	16	0.438	438	525	0.834	
4	(Turkey) Arkas İzmir	6	0	6	2	5	18	0.278	450	528	0.852	

Date	Time		Score		Set 1	Set 2	Set 3	Set 4	Set 5	Total	Report
23 Oct	18:00	Energy Investments Lugano (Switzerland)	3–2	(Turkey) Arkas İzmir	18–25	25–20	25–21	20–25	15–9	103–100	Report
24 Oct	20:30	Diatec Trentino (Italy)	3–1	(Germany) Berlin Recycling Volleys	25–20	21–25	29–27	25–21		100–93	Report
29 Oct	19:00	Arkas İzmir (Turkey)	1–3	(Germany) Berlin Recycling Volleys	25–23	15–25	20–25	21–25		81–98	Report
30 Oct	20:30	Diatec Trentino (Italy)	3–0	(Switzerland) Energy Investments Lugano	25–16	25–15	25–23			75–54	Report
6 Nov	18:00	Energy Investments Lugano (Switzerland)	1–3	(Germany) Berlin Recycling Volleys	25–22	15–25	22–25	18–25		80–97	Report
6 Nov	18:30	Arkas İzmir (Turkey)	0–3	(Italy) Diatec Trentino	15–25	21–25	13–25			49–75	Report
4 Dec	19:30	Berlin Recycling Volleys (Germany)	3–0	(Switzerland) Energy Investments Lugano	25–21	25–18	25–18			75–57	Report
4 Dec	20:30	Diatec Trentino (Italy)	3–0	(Turkey) Arkas İzmir	25–21	26–24	25–15			76–60	Report
10 Dec	18:00	Energy Investments Lugano (Switzerland)	0–3	(Italy) Diatec Trentino	16–25	12–25	15–25			43–75	Report
10 Dec	19:30	Berlin Recycling Volleys (Germany)	3–0	(Turkey) Arkas İzmir	25–20	25–23	25–14			75–57	Report
18 Dec	19:30	Berlin Recycling Volleys (Germany)	3–0	(Italy) Diatec Trentino	25–16	25–18	25–19			75–53	Report
18 Dec	20:30	Arkas İzmir (Turkey)	2–3	(Switzerland) Energy Investments Lugano	25–16	25–20	23–25	17–25	13–15	103–101	Report

=== Pool E ===
Pos	Team	Pld	W	L	Pts	SW	SL	SR	SPW	SPL	SPR	Qualification
1	(Russia) Zenit Kazan	6	5	1	14	15	9	1.667	553	503	1.099	Playoffs
2	(Italy) Lube Banca Marche Macerata	6	4	2	12	15	8	1.875	524	490	1.069	Playoffs
3	(Russia) Lokomotiv Novosibirsk	6	2	4	8	12	13	0.923	553	549	1.007	
4	(Austria) Posojilnica Aich/Dob	6	1	5	2	5	17	0.294	433	521	0.831	

Date	Time		Score		Set 1	Set 2	Set 3	Set 4	Set 5	Total	Report
22 Oct	20:30	Lube Banca Marche Macerata (Italy)	3–0	(Russia) Zenit Kazan	27–25	25–21	25–22			77–68	Report
24 Oct	19:00	Lokomotiv Novosibirsk (Russia)	3–0	(Austria) Posojilnica Aich/Dob	25–20	25–18	25–22			75–60	Report
30 Oct	19:00	Zenit Kazan (Russia)	3–1	(Russia) Lokomotiv Novosibirsk	14–25	25–13	25–21	25–19		89–78	Report
30 Oct	20:25	Posojilnica Aich/Dob (Austria)	0–3	(Italy) Lube Banca Marche Macerata	20–25	19–25	17–25			56–75	Report
6 Nov	19:00	Zenit Kazan (Russia)	3–1	(Austria) Posojilnica Aich/Dob	25–14	19–25	25–15	25–19		94–73	Report
6 Nov	20:30	Lube Banca Marche Macerata (Italy)	3–2	(Russia) Lokomotiv Novosibirsk	25–19	22–25	29–27	22–25	15–12	113–108	Report
3 Dec	19:00	Lokomotiv Novosibirsk (Russia)	3–1	(Italy) Lube Banca Marche Macerata	25–23	25–15	19–25	25–17		94–80	Report
3 Dec	20:25	Posojilnica Aich/Dob (Austria)	1–3	(Russia) Zenit Kazan	25–20	22–25	13–25	20–25		80–95	Report
10 Dec	19:00	Lokomotiv Novosibirsk (Russia)	1–3	(Russia) Zenit Kazan	23–25	24–26	25–21	19–25		91–97	Report
10 Dec	20:30	Lube Banca Marche Macerata (Italy)	3–0	(Austria) Posojilnica Aich/Dob	25–19	25–16	25–19			75–54	Report
18 Dec	19:00	Zenit Kazan (Russia)	3–2	(Italy) Lube Banca Marche Macerata	21–25	24–26	25–22	25–23	15–8	110–104	Report
18 Dec	20:25	Posojilnica Aich/Dob (Austria)	3–2	(Russia) Lokomotiv Novosibirsk	25–21	22–25	23–25	25–23	15–13	110–107	Report

=== Pool F ===
Pos	Team	Pld	W	L	Pts	SW	SL	SR	SPW	SPL	SPR	Qualification
1	(Poland) Jastrzębski Węgiel	6	5	1	14	16	8	2.000	587	554	1.060	Playoffs
2	(Turkey) Halkbank Ankara (Note: Qualified as hosts) (H)	6	4	2	13	15	8	1.875	567	519	1.092	Final Four
3	(Romania) Tomis Constanța	6	3	3	9	12	12	1.000	552	536	1.030	2013–14 CEV Cup
4	(Austria) Hypo Tirol Innsbruck	6	0	6	0	3	18	0.167	423	520	0.813	

(H) Host
Notes:

Date	Time		Score		Set 1	Set 2	Set 3	Set 4	Set 5	Total	Report
22 Oct	19:00	Halkbank Ankara (Turkey)	3–1	(Poland) Jastrzębski Węgiel	34–36	25–16	25–17	25–20		109–89	Report
23 Oct	20:25	Hypo Tirol Innsbruck (Austria)	1–3	(Romania) Tomis Constanța	14–25	21–25	25–22	16–25		76–97	Report
29 Oct	18:00	Jastrzębski Węgiel (Poland)	3–0	(Austria) Hypo Tirol Innsbruck	25–23	25–22	25–20			75–65	Report
30 Oct	18:00	Tomis Constanța (Romania)	1–3	(Turkey) Halkbank Ankara	23–25	25–19	23–25	15–25		86–94	Report
5 Nov	20:25	Hypo Tirol Innsbruck (Austria)	0–3	(Turkey) Halkbank Ankara	19–25	22–25	21–25			62–75	Report
6 Nov	18:00	Tomis Constanța (Romania)	1–3	(Poland) Jastrzębski Węgiel	25–22	19–25	15–25	20–25		79–97	Report
3 Dec	18:00	Jastrzębski Węgiel (Poland)	3–1	(Romania) Tomis Constanța	25–17	25–27	25–21	25–22		100–87	Report
5 Dec	18:00	Halkbank Ankara (Turkey)	3–0	(Austria) Hypo Tirol Innsbruck	25–18	25–18	25–15			75–51	Report
10 Dec	20:25	Hypo Tirol Innsbruck (Austria)	1–3	(Poland) Jastrzębski Węgiel	25–19	26–28	21–25	22–25		94–97	Report
11 Dec	19:00	Halkbank Ankara (Turkey)	1–3	(Romania) Tomis Constanța	21–25	29–27	23–25	21–25		94–102	Report
18 Dec	18:00	Tomis Constanța (Romania)	3–1	(Austria) Hypo Tirol Innsbruck	25–12	25–15	26–28	25–20		101–75	Report
18 Dec	18:00	Jastrzębski Węgiel (Poland)	3–2	(Turkey) Halkbank Ankara	25–27	25–18	37–39	25–21	17–15	129–120	Report

=== Pool G ===
Pos	Team	Pld	W	L	Pts	SW	SL	SR	SPW	SPL	SPR	Qualification
1	(Belgium) Knack Roeselare	6	6	0	17	18	6	3.000	587	543	1.081	Playoffs
2	(Germany) VfB Friedrichshafen	6	2	4	9	13	13	1.000	592	577	1.026	2013–14 CEV Cup
3	(Poland) ZAKSA Kędzierzyn-Koźle	6	3	3	8	13	13	1.000	582	577	1.009	
4	(Turkey) Galatasaray İstanbul	6	1	5	2	5	17	0.294	471	535	0.880	

Date	Time		Score		Set 1	Set 2	Set 3	Set 4	Set 5	Total	Report
22 Oct	20:30	Knack Roeselare (Belgium)	3–1	(Germany) VfB Friedrichshafen	20–25	31–29	25–17	25–23		101–94	Report
23 Oct	18:00	ZAKSA Kędzierzyn-Koźle (Poland)	3–0	(Turkey) Galatasaray İstanbul	25–23	25–18	25–22			75–63	Report
30 Oct	17:30	Galatasaray İstanbul (Turkey)	0–3	(Belgium) Knack Roeselare	21–25	23–25	19–25			63–75	Report
30 Oct	19:00	VfB Friedrichshafen (Germany)	2–3	(Poland) ZAKSA Kędzierzyn-Koźle	22–25	25–15	18–25	25–19	20–22	110–106	Report
5 Nov	20:30	Knack Roeselare (Belgium)	3–1	(Poland) ZAKSA Kędzierzyn-Koźle	25–22	20–25	25–20	25–23		95–90	Report
6 Nov	19:00	VfB Friedrichshafen (Germany)	3–0	(Turkey) Galatasaray İstanbul	25–16	25–20	25–17			75–53	Report
3 Dec	20:00	Galatasaray İstanbul (Turkey)	1–3	(Germany) VfB Friedrichshafen	19–25	22–25	25–23	20–25		86–98	Report
4 Dec	18:00	ZAKSA Kędzierzyn-Koźle (Poland)	1–3	(Belgium) Knack Roeselare	26–28	15–25	25–17	23–25		89–95	Report
10 Dec	20:30	Knack Roeselare (Belgium)	3–1	(Turkey) Galatasaray İstanbul	25–21	33–31	22–25	25–22		105–99	Report
11 Dec	18:00	ZAKSA Kędzierzyn-Koźle (Poland)	3–2	(Germany) VfB Friedrichshafen	25–17	23–25	21–25	31–29	15–11	115–107	Report
18 Dec	18:00	Galatasaray İstanbul (Turkey)	3–2	(Poland) ZAKSA Kędzierzyn-Koźle	21–25	25–23	20–25	26–24	15–10	107–107	Report
18 Dec	19:00	VfB Friedrichshafen (Germany)	2–3	(Belgium) Knack Roeselare	25–21	25–22	31–33	16–25	11–15	108–116	Report

== Playoffs ==
The playoffs will consist of two rounds: Playoff 12 and Playoff 6. These will be played between 14 January and 13 February 2014. Each round is played in two legs.

If the teams are tied after two legs, a "Golden Set" is played. The winner is the team that first obtains 15 points, provided that the points difference between the two teams is at least 2 points (thus, the Golden Set is similar to a tiebreak set in a normal match).

At each leg, points are awarded to the teams in the same manner as in the Group Round (3 for 3:0 or 3:1, 2 for 3:2 etc.). So, if team A defeat team B in the first leg 3:0 and lose in the second leg 1:3, team A does not advance to the next round (as it would have been expected on the basis of analogy with football competitions), but the two teams are tied with 3 points each, and a Golden Set is played.

The three teams that win in Playoff 6 round advance to the Final Four.

Pool	Winners	Second place
A	(Italy) Copra Elior Piacenza	(France) Tours VB
B	(Russia) Belogorie Belgorod	(Belgium) Noliko Maaseik
C	(Poland) Asseco Resovia	(Montenegro) Budvanska Rivijera Budva
D	(Italy) Diatec Trentino	(Germany) Berlin Recycling Volleys
E	(Russia) Zenit Kazan	(Italy) Lube Banca Marche Macerata
F	(Poland) Jastrzębski Węgiel	(Turkey) Halkbank Ankara (F4 Hosts)
G	(Belgium) Knack Roeselare	

- All times are local.

=== Playoff 12 ===
Team 1	Agg.	Team 2	1st leg	2nd leg	Golden Set
Berlin Recycling Volleys (Germany)	0–6	(Russia) Zenit Kazan	0–3	0–3	
Lube Banca Marche Macerata (Italy)	3–3	(Italy) Copra Elior Piacenza	3–0	0–3	13–15
Tours VB (France)	0–6	(Poland) Jastrzębski Węgiel	0–3	0–3	
Asseco Resovia (Poland)	6–0	(Belgium) Knack Roeselare	3–1	3–1	
Noliko Maaseik (Belgium)	0–6	(Italy) Diatec Trentino	1–3	1–3	
Budvanska Rivijera Budva (Montenegro)	1–5	(Russia) Belogorie Belgorod	2–3	0–3	

==== First leg ====
Date	Time		Score		Set 1	Set 2	Set 3	Set 4	Set 5	Total	Report
16 Jan	19:30	Berlin Recycling Volleys (Germany)	0–3	(Russia) Zenit Kazan	20–25	22–25	20–25			62–75	Report
16 Jan	20:30	Lube Banca Marche Macerata (Italy)	3–0	(Italy) Copra Elior Piacenza	25–22	25–21	25–23			75–66	Report
15 Jan	20:30	Tours VB (France)	0–3	(Poland) Jastrzębski Węgiel	16–25	24–26	19–25			59–76	Report
14 Jan	20:30	Asseco Resovia (Poland)	3–1	(Belgium) Knack Roeselare	22–25	25–17	25–20	25–18		97–80	Report
14 Jan	20:30	Noliko Maaseik (Belgium)	1–3	(Italy) Diatec Trentino	25–22	15–25	24–26	18–25		82–98	Report
16 Jan	18:00	Budvanska Rivijera Budva (Montenegro)	2–3	(Russia) Belogorie Belgorod	25–15	24–26	15–25	25–19	10–15	99–100	Report

==== Second leg ====
Date	Time		Score		Set 1	Set 2	Set 3	Set 4	Set 5	Total	Report
21 Jan	19:30	Zenit Kazan (Russia)	3–0	(Germany) Berlin Recycling Volleys	25–11	25–20	25–23			75–54	Report
23 Jan	20:30	Copra Elior Piacenza (Italy)	3–0	(Italy) Lube Banca Marche Macerata	25–22	25–19	25–20			75–61	Report
Golden set		Copra Elior Piacenza (Italy)	15–13	(Italy) Lube Banca Marche Macerata							
22 Jan	18:00	Jastrzębski Węgiel (Poland)	3–0	(France) Tours VB	25–23	25–16	25–22			75–61	Report
22 Jan	20:30	Knack Roeselare (Belgium)	1–3	(Poland) Asseco Resovia	18–25	28–26	16–25	18–25		80–101	Report
22 Jan	20:30	Diatec Trentino (Italy)	3–1	(Belgium) Noliko Maaseik	25–23	25–19	26–28	25–23		101–93	Report
22 Jan	19:00	Belogorie Belgorod (Russia)	3–0	(Montenegro) Budvanska Rivijera Budva	25–22	25–19	25–16			75–57	Report

=== Playoff 6 ===
Team 1	Agg.	Team 2	1st leg	2nd leg
Copra Elior Piacenza (Italy)	0–6	(Russia) Zenit Kazan	0–3	0–3
Jastrzębski Węgiel (Poland)	6–0	(Poland) Asseco Resovia	3–0	3–1
Belogorie Belgorod (Russia)	6–0	(Italy) Diatec Trentino	3–0	3–0

==== First leg ====
Date	Time		Score		Set 1	Set 2	Set 3	Set 4	Set 5	Total	Report
6 Feb	20:30	Copra Elior Piacenza (Italy)	0–3	(Russia) Zenit Kazan	23–25	22–25	22–25			67–75	Report
5 Feb	18:00	Jastrzębski Węgiel (Poland)	3–0	(Poland) Asseco Resovia	25–22	25–22	25–23			75–67	Report
5 Feb	19:00	Belogorie Belgorod (Russia)	3–0	(Italy) Diatec Trentino	25–20	25–20	25–18			75–58	Report

==== Second leg ====
Date	Time		Score		Set 1	Set 2	Set 3	Set 4	Set 5	Total	Report
12 Feb	19:30	Zenit Kazan (Russia)	3–0	(Italy) Copra Elior Piacenza	25–21	25–20	25–22			75–63	Report
11 Feb	18:00	Asseco Resovia (Poland)	1–3	(Poland) Jastrzębski Węgiel	25–27	25–23	24–26	24–26		98–102	Report
13 Feb	20:30	Diatec Trentino (Italy)	0–3	(Russia) Belogorie Belgorod	15–25	20–25	22–25			57–75	Report

== Final Four ==
- Organizer: (Turkey) Halkbank Ankara
- Place: Ankara
- All times are Eastern European Time (UTC+02:00).

Semifinals
22 March
(Poland) Jastrzębski Węgiel	0
(Turkey) Halkbank Ankara	3
22 March
(Russia) Belogorie Belgorod	3
(Russia) Zenit Kazan	1

Final
23 March
(Turkey) Halkbank Ankara	1
(Russia) Belogorie Belgorod	3
3rd place match
23 March
(Poland) Jastrzębski Węgiel	3
(Russia) Zenit Kazan	1

=== Semifinals ===
Date	Time		Score		Set 1	Set 2	Set 3	Set 4	Set 5	Total	Report
22 Mar	17:00	Jastrzębski Węgiel (Poland)	0–3	(Turkey) Halkbank Ankara	21–25	19–25	19–25			59–75	Report
22 Mar	14:00	Belogorie Belgorod (Russia)	3–1	(Russia) Zenit Kazan	25–19	22–25	25–18	25–17		97–79	Report

=== 3rd place match ===
Date	Time		Score		Set 1	Set 2	Set 3	Set 4	Set 5	Total	Report
23 Mar	14:00	Jastrzębski Węgiel (Poland)	3–1	(Russia) Zenit Kazan	25–21	20–25	25–17	25–23		95–86	Report

=== Final ===
Date	Time		Score		Set 1	Set 2	Set 3	Set 4	Set 5	Total	Report
23 Mar	17:00	Halkbank Ankara (Turkey)	1–3	(Russia) Belogorie Belgorod	18–25	25–22	16–25	25–27		84–99	Report

== Final standings ==
Qualified for the 2014 FIVB Club World Championship

Rank	Team
1st place, gold medalist(s)	(Russia) Belogorie Belgorod
2nd place, silver medalist(s)	(Turkey) Halkbank Ankara
3rd place, bronze medalist(s)	(Poland) Jastrzębski Węgiel
4	(Russia) Zenit Kazan

2013–14 CEV Champions League winners

3rd title

== Awards ==
- Most valuable player
  (Russia) Sergey Tetyukhin (Belogorie Belgorod)
- Best scorer
  (Italy) Michał Łasko (Jastrzębski Węgiel)
- Best spiker
  (Russia) Maxim Mikhaylov (Zenit Kazan)
- Best server
  (Turkey) Emre Batur (Halkbank Ankara)
- Best blocker
  (Russia) Dmitry Muserskiy (Belogorie Belgorod)
- Best receiver
  (Bulgaria) Matey Kaziyski (Halkbank Ankara)
- Best libero
  (Poland) Damian Wojtaszek (Jastrzębski Węgiel)
- Best setter
  (Brazil) Raphael Oliveira (Halkbank Ankara)
