= Roman Bragin =

Russian volleyball player (born 1987)

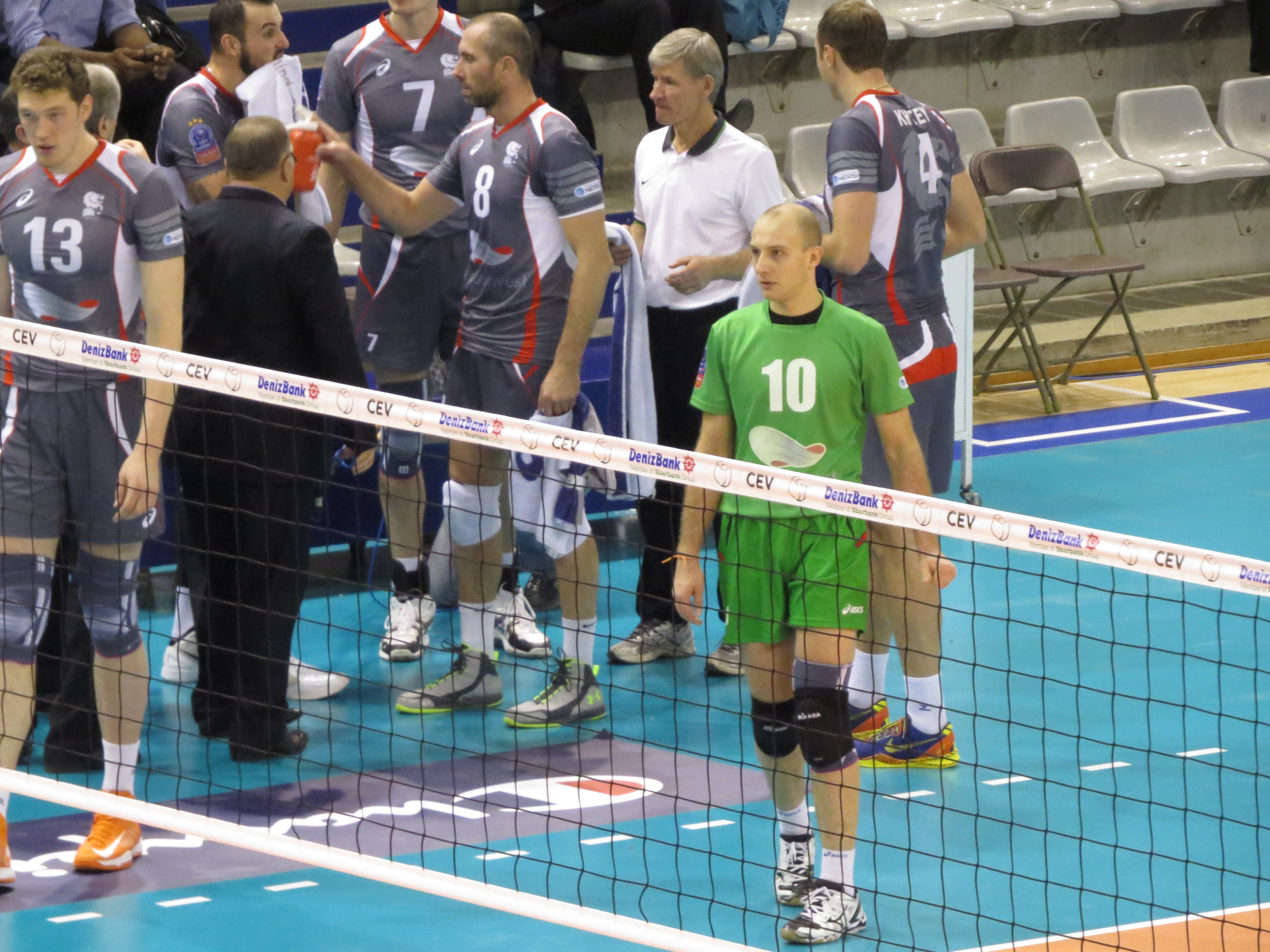
- Bragin (green) in 2014

Personal information
- Full name: Roman Gennadievich Bragin
- Nationality: Russian
- Born: 17 April 1987 (age 39); USSR
- Height: 1.87 m (6 ft 2 in)
- Weight: 82 kg (181 lb)
- Spike: 320 cm (126 in)
- Block: 305 cm (120 in)

Volleyball information
- Position: Libero
- Current club: Ural Ufa
- Number: 10

Career
Years	Teams
2005–2006; 2006–2013; 2013–2016; 2016–2018; 2018–	Luch Moscow; Dinamo Moscow; Belogorie Belgorod; Dinamo Moscow; Ural Ufa

National team
2015	Russia
Honours
Men's volleyball
Representing Russia
European Games
Bronze medal – third place	2015 Baku
- Last updated: 30 December 2017

Roman Bragin (born 17 April 1987) is a Russian male volleyball player. With his club Belogorie Belgorod he competed at the 2014 FIVB Volleyball Men's Club World Championship. As part of the Russia men's national volleyball team he won the bronze medal at the 2015 European Games in Baku.
