= Sergei Shipulin =

Russian footballer and coach

Personal information
- Full name: Sergei Sergeyevich Shipulin
- Date of birth: 9 June 1978 (age 48)
- Place of birth: Krasnodar, Russian SFSR
- Height: 1.81 m (5 ft 11 1/2 in)
- Position: Defender

Senior career*
Years	Team	Apps	(Gls)
1996–1998	FC Kuban Krasnodar	34	(2)
1996–1997	→ FC Kuban-d Krasnodar	39	(2)
1999–2002	FC Lada-Tolyatti	90	(4)
2002–2003	FC Kuban Krasnodar	16	(0)
2004	FC Dynamo Krasnodar		
2005–2006	FC Spartak Shchyolkovo	14	(0)
2006	FC Dynamo Makhachkala	6	(0)
2007	FC Chernomorets Novorossiysk	3	(0)
2008	FC Dynamo Krasnodar		
2009	FC Pontos Vityazevo		
2010	FC Dynamo-Biolog Novokubansk (amateur)		
2011	FC Biolog-Novokubansk	11	(0)
2011–2013	FC Slavyansky Slavyansk-na-Kubani	20	(0)
2013	FC Omega Kurganinsk		

Managerial career
- 2013–2014: FC Omega Kurganinsk (assistant)
- * Club domestic league appearances and goals

Sergei Sergeyevich Shipulin (Russian: Серге́й Серге́евич Шипулин; born 9 June 1978) is a Russian professional football coach and a former player.

== Club career ==
He played 7 seasons in the Russian Football National League for FC Kuban Krasnodar, FC Lada-Tolyatti and FC Dynamo Makhachkala.
