= VC Belogorie =

Russian volleyball club

Belogorie Belgorod
- Full name: Volleyball Club "Belogorie"
- Founded: 1976
- Ground: Belgorod Arena (Capacity: 10,105)
- Chairman: Sergey Tetyukhin
- Manager: Aleksandr Volkov
- Captain: Roman Bragin
- League: Super League
- 2022/23: 5th
- Website: Club home page

Uniforms
| Home | Away |

VC Belogorie Belgorod (Russian: ВК Белогорье) is a Russian professional volleyball club based in Belgorod, which is participating in the Russian Volleyball Super League. VC Belogorie won the Russian Championship and the Russian Cup eight times each. The club is also a three-times CEV Champions League champion.

== Achievements ==
International competitions

- FIVB Club World Championship

Winners (1): 2014

- CEV Champions League

Winners (3): 2003, 2004, 2014
Third place (2): 2005, 2006

- CEV Cup

Winners (2): 2009, 2018
Third place (1): 1997

- CEV Challenge Cup

Winners (1): 2019
Runners-up (1): 2002

Domestic competitions

- Russian Super League

Winners (8): 1997, 1998, 2000, 2002, 2003, 2004, 2005, 2013
Runners-up (6): 1995, 1996, 1999, 2006, 2010, 2015
Third place (5): 2011, 2014, 2016, 2024, 2025

- Russian Cup

Winners (8): 1995, 1996, 1997, 1998, 2003, 2005, 2012, 2013
Runners-up (1): 2015

- Russian SuperCup

Winners (2): 2013, 2014

== Former names ==
| 1976–1981 | Tekhnolog Belgorod |
| 1981–1987 | Lokomotiv Belgorod |
| 1987–1992 | Agrarnik Belgorod |
| 1992–1993 | Belogorie Belgorod |
| 1993–1995 | Lokomotiv Belgorod |
| 1995–1997 | Belogorie Belgorod |
| 1997–2001 | Belogorie-Dynamo Belgorod |
| 2001–2011 | Lokomotiv-Belogorie Belgorod |
| 2011–present | Belogorie Belgorod |

== Team roster ==
Team roster – season 2021/2022

| No. | Name | Date of birth | Position |
|---|---|---|---|
| 1 | (Russia) Igor Filippov | March 19, 1991 (age 34) | middle blocker |
| 2 | (Russia) Vsevolod Abramychev | June 5, 2000 (age 25) | setter |
| 3 | (Russia) Dmitriy Kovalev | March 15, 1991 (age 34) | setter |
| 4 | (Serbia) Nemanja Petrić | July 28, 1987 (age 38) | outside hitter |
| 5 | (Russia) Andrey Ananev | June 21, 1992 (age 33) | middle blocker |
| 6 | (Russia) Ilya Kirillov | January 24, 1996 (age 29) | libero |
| 7 | (Russia) Stanislav Masliev | July 21, 1994 (age 31) | outside hitter |
| 8 | (Russia) Pavel Tetyukhin | October 22, 2000 (age 25) | outside hitter |
| 9 | (Russia) Ilya Spodobets | July 26, 1997 (age 28) | outside hitter |
| 10 | (Russia) Roman Bragin (C) | April 17, 1987 (age 38) | libero |
| 11 | (Morocco) Mohamed Al Hachdadi | February 2, 1991 (age 34) | opposite |
| 13 | (Russia) Alexey Samoylenko | June 23, 1985 (age 40) | middle blocker |
| 17 | (Russia) Georgii Zabolotnikov | October 7, 2002 (age 23) | middle blocker |
| 18 | (Russia) Egor Sidenko | September 7, 1999 (age 26) | opposite |

Team roster - season 2017/2018
Belogorie Belgorod
| No. | Name | Date of birth | Position |
|---|---|---|---|
| 1 | (Russia) Aleksey Obmochaev | May 22, 1989 | libero |
| 2 | (Russia) Alexander Safonov | June 17, 1991 | middle blocker |
| 5 | (Russia) Sergey Grankin | January 21, 1985 | setter |
| 7 | (Bulgaria) Nikolay Nikolov | July 29, 1986 | middle blocker |
| 8 | (Russia) Sergey Tetyukhin | September 23, 1975 | outside hitter |
| 9 | (Russia) Konstantin Bakun | March 15, 1985 | opposite |
| 10 | (Russia) Roman Danilov | January 4, 1985 | opposite |
| 11 | (Russia) Roman Poroshin | August 28, 1995 | setter |
| 12 | (Russia) Nikita Eremin | September 1, 1990 | libero |
| 13 | (Russia) Dmitriy Muserskiy | October 29, 1988 | middle blocker |
| 14 | (Russia) Ruslan Khanipov | March 29, 1989 | middle blocker |
| 16 | (Russia) Ilia Spodobets | July 26, 1997 | outside hitter |
| 17 | (Russia) Maxim Zhigalov | July 26, 1989 | opposite |
| 18 | (Ukraine) Ian Iereshchenko | April 6, 1990 | outside hitter |
Head coach: Gennady Shipulin; Assistant:

Team roster - season 2016/2017
Belogorie Belgorod
| No. | Name | Date of birth | Position |
|---|---|---|---|
| 1 | (Ukraine) Dmitry Teremenko | February 1, 1987 | middle blocker |
| 3 | (Russia) Anton Fomenko | October 18, 1987 | outside hitter |
| 4 | (Russia) Taras Khtey | May 22, 1982 | outside hitter |
| 5 | (Russia) Roman Martynyuk | April 13, 1987 | libero |
| 7 | (Russia) Artem Smoliar | February 4, 1985 | middle blocker |
| 8 | (Russia) Sergey Tetyukhin | September 23, 1975 | outside hitter |
| 9 | (Russia) Yaroslav Podlesny | September 3, 1994 | outside hitter |
| 10 | (Russia) Roman Danilov | January 4, 1985 | opposite |
| 11 | (Russia) Roman Poroshin | August 28, 1995 | setter |
| 12 | (Russia) German Snegirev | August 11, 1996 | middle blocker |
| 13 | (Russia) Dmitriy Muserskiy | October 29, 1988 | middle blocker |
| 15 | (Russia) Grigoriy Dragunov | July 16, 1992 | libero |
| 16 | (Russia) Sergey Bagrey | August 14, 1987 (age 38) | setter |
| 17 | (Russia) Maxim Zhigalov | July 26, 1989 (age 36) | opposite |
| 18 | (Ukraine) Yan Tereshchenko | April 6, 1990 (age 35) | outside hitter |
Head coach: Gennady Shipulin; Assistant:

Team roster - season 2015/2016
Belogorie Belgorod
| No. | Name | Date of birth | Position |
|---|---|---|---|
| 1 | (Russia) Sergey Antipkin | March 28, 1986 | setter |
| 2 | (Russia) Aleksandr Safonov | June 17, 1991 | middle blocker |
| 3 | (Russia) Aleksandr Kosarev | September 30, 1977 | outside hitter |
| 4 | (Russia) Taras Khtey | May 22, 1982 | outside hitter |
| 5 | (Russia) Roman Martynyuk | April 13, 1987 | libero |
| 6 | (Russia) Kirill Makeshin | May 10, 1989 | middle blocker |
| 7 | (Russia) Artem Smoliar | February 4, 1985 | middle blocker |
| 8 | (Russia) Sergey Tetyukhin | September 23, 1975 | outside hitter |
| 11 | (Russia) Dmitry Krasikov | February 8, 1987 | outside hitter |
| 12 | (Russia) Roman Danilov | January 4, 1985 | outside hitter |
| 13 | (Russia) Dmitriy Muserskiy | October 29, 1988 | middle blocker/opposite |
| 14 | (Ukraine) Konstantin Lesik | July 10, 1987 | setter |
| 15 | (Serbia) Marko Ivović | December 22, 1990 | outside hitter |
| 18 | (Russia) Pavel Nikolaenko | September 15, 1991 | middle blocker |
Head coach: Gennady Shipulin; Assistant:
