= Sergey Tetyukhin =

Russian volleyball player

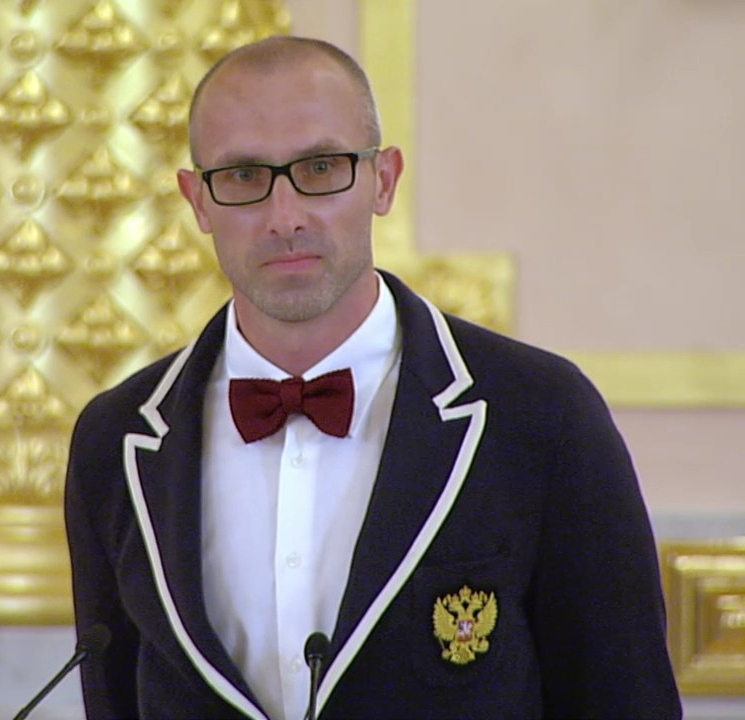
- Tetyukhin in 2016

Personal information
- Full name: Sergey Yuryevich Tetyukhin
- Nickname: Tyutik
- Nationality: Russian
- Born: 23 September 1975 (age 51); Ferghana, Uzbek SSR, USSR
- Height: 1.97 m (6 ft 6 in)
- Weight: 89 kg (196 lb)
- Spike: 345 cm (136 in)
- Block: 338 cm (133 in)

Volleyball information
- Position: Outside hitter
- Current club: Belogorie Belgorod (general manager)

Career
Years	Teams
1992–1999; 1999–2001; 2001–2006; 2006–2008; 2008–2009; 2009–2011; 2011–2018	Lokomotiv Belgorod; Maxicono Parma; Lokomotiv-Belogorie Belgorod; Dynamo-Tattransgaz; Lokomotiv Belgorod; Zenit Kazan; Belogorie Belgorod

National team
1996–2016	Russia (450)
Honours
Men's volleyball
Representing Russia
Olympic Games
Gold medal – first place	2012 London	Team
Silver medal – second place	2000 Sydney	Team
Bronze medal – third place	2004 Athens	Team
Bronze medal – third place	2008 Beijing	Team
World Championship
Silver medal – second place	2002 Argentina	Team
World Cup
Gold medal – first place	1999 Japan	Team
Gold medal – first place	2011 Japan	Team
Silver medal – second place	2007 Japan	Team
World League
Gold medal – first place	2002 Belo Horizonte	Team
Silver medal – second place	1998 Milan	Team
Silver medal – second place	2000 Rotterdam	Team
Bronze medal – third place	1996 Rotterdam	Team
Bronze medal – third place	1997 Moscow	Team
Bronze medal – third place	2001 Katowice	Team
Bronze medal – third place	2006 Moscow	Team
Bronze medal – third place	2008 Rio de Janeiro	Team
Bronze medal – third place	2009 Belgrade	Team
European Championship
Silver medal – second place	1999 Austria	Team
Silver medal – second place	2005 Italy/Serbia and Montenegro	Team
Silver medal – second place	2007 Russia	Team
Bronze medal – third place	2001 Czech Republic	Team
Bronze medal – third place	2003 Germany	Team
European League
Silver medal – second place	2004 Czech Republic	Team
- Last updated: 29 December 2017

Sergey Yuryevich Tetyukhin (Russian: Серге́й Юрьевич Тетюхин; born 23 September 1975) is a former Russian volleyball player. He was born in Fergana, Uzbekistan. He is 1.97 m tall, and plays as passer-attacker. Together with Samuele Papi and Sérgio Santos, he is one of only three male volleyball players who have accumulated four Olympic medals in the course of their long sporting careers. Tetyukhin, however, has the distinction of being the only volleyball player in the world (male or female) with four Olympic medals who has all three types of those awards, including gold at the London Olympics. He competed at six Summer Olympics, having been the flag-bearer in 2016.

== Awards ==
=== Individual ===
- 1999 European Championship - Best Receiver
- 2001 Order of Friendship
- 2002 FIVB World Championship - Outside Hitter in Super Seven Selection
- 2003 CEV Champions League - Most Valuable Player
- 2009 Medal of the Order For Merit to the Fatherland
- 2011 CEV Champions League - Best Server
- 2012 Order of Honour Russia
- 2014 CEV Champions League - Most Valuable Player
- 2014 FIVB Club World Championship - Best Outside Spiker
- 2016 Olympic Qualifier - Most Valuable Player
- 2016 European Confederation - Volleyball Ambassador of the Year

=== Clubs ===
==== CEV Champions League ====
- 2002/2003 - with Lokomotiv-Belogorie Belgorod
- 2003/2004 - with Lokomotiv-Belogorie Belgorod
- 2004/2005 - with Lokomotiv-Belogorie Belgorod
- 2005/2006 - with Lokomotiv-Belogorie Belgorod
- 2007/2008 - with Dynamo-Tattransgaz
- 2010/2011 - with Zenit Kazan
- 2013/2014 - with Belogorie Belgorod

==== FIVB Club World Championship ====
- Doha 2009 - with Zenit Kazan
- Belo Horizonte 2014 - with Belogorie Belgorod

==== CEV Cup ====
- 1996/1997 - with Belogorie Belgorod
- 2008/2009 - with Lokomotiv-Belogorie Belgorod
- 2017/2018 - with Belogorie Belgorod

==== CEV Challenge Cup ====
- 2001/2002 - with Lokomotiv-Belogorie Belgorod

==== National Championships ====
- 1994/1995 Russian Championship, with Lokomotiv Belgorod
- 1994/1995 Russian Cup, with Lokomotiv Belgorod
- 1995/1996 Russian Championship, with Belogorie Belgorod
- 1995/1996 Russian Cup, with Belogorie Belgorod
- 1996/1997 Russian Championship, with Belogorie Belgorod
- 1996/1997 Russian Cup, with Belogorie Belgorod
- 1997/1998 Russian Championship, with Belogorie-Dynamo Belgorod
- 1997/1998 Russian Cup, with Belogorie-Dynamo Belgorod
- 1998/1999 Russian Championship, with Belogorie-Dynamo Belgorod
- 2001/2002 Russian Championship, with Lokomotiv-Belogorie Belgorod
- 2002/2003 Russian Championship, with Lokomotiv-Belogorie Belgorod
- 2002/2003 Russian Cup, with Lokomotiv-Belogorie Belgorod
- 2003/2004 Russian Championship, with Lokomotiv-Belogorie Belgorod
- 2004/2005 Russian Championship, with Lokomotiv-Belogorie Belgorod
- 2004/2005 Russian Cup, with Lokomotiv-Belogorie Belgorod
- 2005/2006 Russian Championship, with Lokomotiv-Belogorie Belgorod
- 2006/2007 Russian Championship, with Dynamo-Tattransgaz
- 2006/2007 Russian Cup, with Dynamo-Tattransgaz
- 2007/2008 Russian Championship, with Dynamo-Tattransgaz
- 2008/2009 Russian Cup, with Lokomotiv-Belogorie Belgorod
- 2009/2010 Russian Championship, with Zenit Kazan
- 2009/2010 Russian Cup, with Zenit Kazan
- 2010/2011 Russian SuperCup 2010, with Zenit Kazan
- 2010/2011 Russian Championship, with Zenit Kazan
- 2011/2012 Russian Cup, with Belogorie Belgorod
- 2012/2013 Russian Championship, with Belogorie Belgorod
- 2012/2013 Russian Cup, with Belogorie Belgorod
- 2013/2014 Russian SuperCup 2013, with Belogorie Belgorod
- 2013/2014 Russian Championship, with Belogorie Belgorod
- 2013/2014 Russian Cup, with Belogorie Belgorod
- 2014/2015 Russian SuperCup 2014, with Belogorie Belgorod
- 2014/2015 Russian Championship, with Belogorie Belgorod
- 2014/2015 Russian Cup, with Belogorie Belgorod
- 2015/2016 Russian Championship, with Belogorie Belgorod

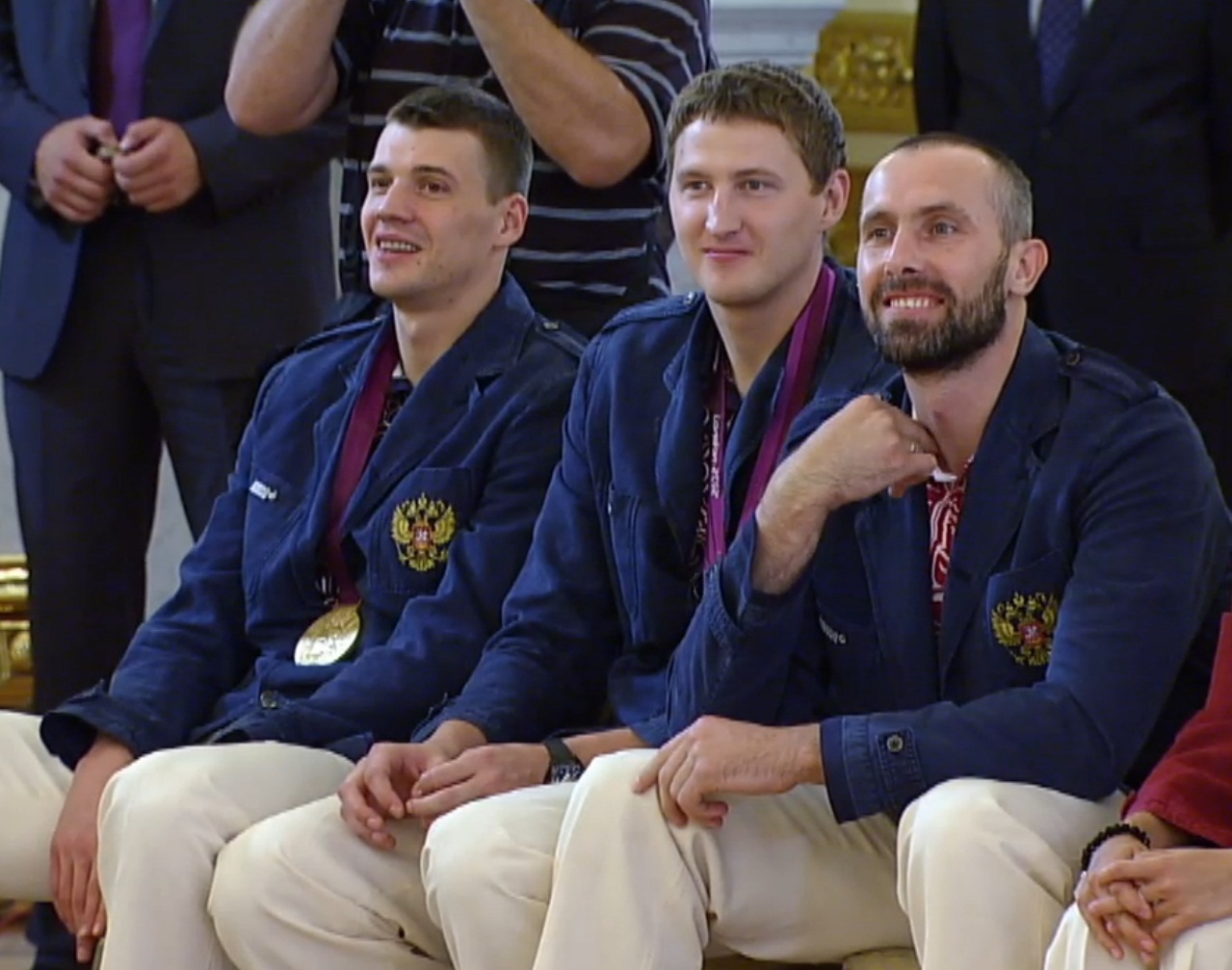
Sergey Tetyukhin (right) at the meeting of Russian meadlists of the 2012 Summer Olympics with the President of Russia on August 16, 2012

=== National team ===
==== Senior team ====
- 1996 FIVB World League
- 1997 FIVB World League
- 1998 FIVB World League
- 1999 FIVB World Cup
- 1999 CEV European Championship
- 2000 Olympic Games
- 2000 FIVB World League
- 2001 FIVB World League
- 2001 CEV European Championship
- 2002 FIVB World League
- 2002 FIVB World Championship
- 2003 CEV European Championship
- 2004 Olympic Games
- 2004 CEV European League
- 2005 CEV European Championship
- 2006 FIVB World League
- 2007 FIVB World Cup
- 2007 CEV European Championship
- 2008 Olympic Games
- 2008 FIVB World League
- 2009 FIVB World League
- 2011 FIVB World Cup
- 2012 Olympic Games

==== Junior team ====
- 1994 CEV U21 European Championship
- 1995 FIVB U21 World Championship

Olympic Games
Preceded by Maria Sharapova	Flagbearer for Russia; Rio de Janeiro 2016	Succeeded by Sofya Velikaya & Maksim Mikhaylov (for ROC)
