= Aleksandr Kosarev (volleyball) =

Russian volleyball player (born 1977)

Personal information
- Full name: Aleksandr Borisovich Kosarev
- Nationality: Russian
- Born: 30 September 1977 (age 49); Belgorod, Russia
- Height: 2.00 m (6 ft 7 in)
- Weight: 90 kg (198 lb)
- Spike: 339 cm (133 in)
- Block: 328 cm (129 in)

Coaching information
Previous teams coached
Years	Teams
2016–	Belogorie Belgorod (coach)

Volleyball information
- Position: Outside hitter
- Current club: (Russia) Belogorie Belgorod

Career
Years	Teams
1997–2006; 2006–2008; 2008–2009; 2009–2010; 2010–2016	Lokomotiv Belgorod; Zenit Kazan; Lokomotiv Belgorod; Fakel Novy Urengoy; Belogorie Belgorod

National team
2000–2009	Russia
Honours
Representing Russia
Men's volleyball
Olympic Games
Bronze medal – third place	2004 Athens
Bronze medal – third place	2008 Beijing
World Championship
Silver medal – second place	2002 Argentina
World League
Gold medal – first place	2002 Belo Horizonte
Silver medal – second place	2000 Rotterdam
Bronze medal – third place	2001 Katowice
Bronze medal – third place	2006 Moscow
Bronze medal – third place	2008 Rio de Janeiro
European Championship
Silver medal – second place	1999 Austria
Silver medal – second place	2005 Seria and Montenegro/Italy
Silver medal – second place	2007 Russia
Bronze medal – third place	2001 Czech Republic
Bronze medal – third place	2003 Germany
- Last updated: 4 March 2016

Aleksandr Borisovich Kosarev (Russian: Александр Борисович Косарев, born 30 September 1977) is a Russian volleyball player, a member of Russia men's national volleyball team and Russian club Belogorie Belgorod.

Kosarev competed at the 2004 Summer Olympics in Athens, Greece, where Russia claimed the bronze medal by defeating the United States in the play-off for third place.
