= Taras Khtey =

Russian volleyball player (born 1982)

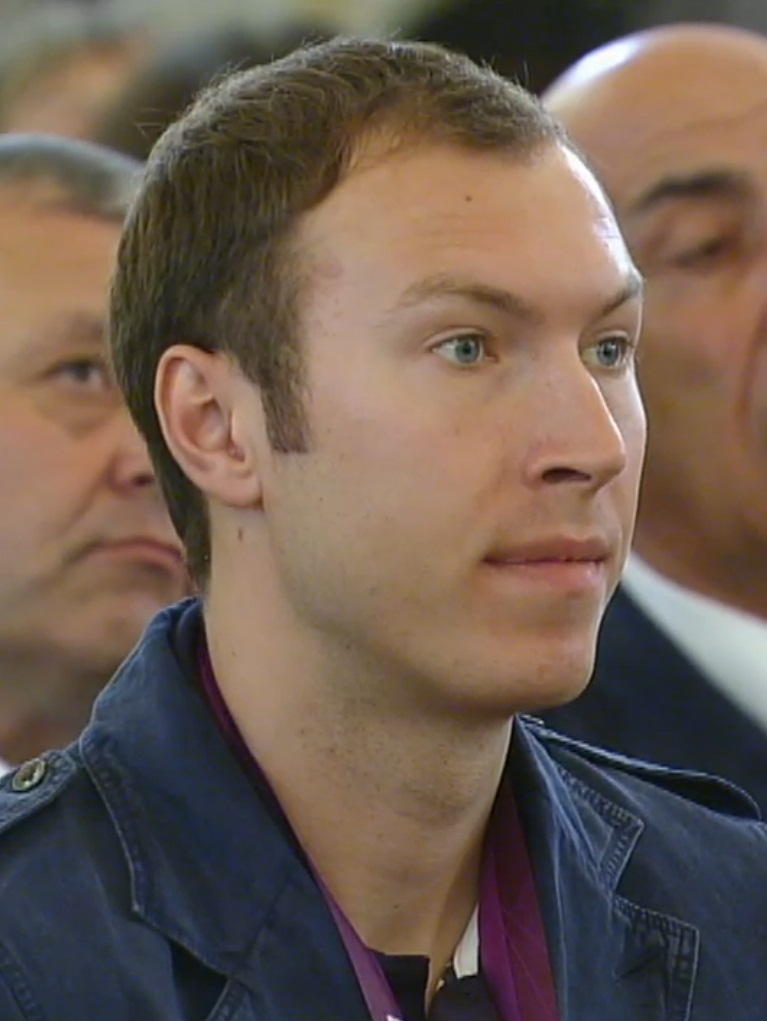

Personal information
- Full name: Taras Yurevich Khtey
- Nationality: Ukrainian; Russian
- Born: May 22, 1982 (age 44); Zabuzhzhya, Ukraine, USSR
- Height: 1.97 m (6 ft 6 in)
- Weight: 0 kg (0 lb)
- Spike: 0 cm (0 in)
- Block: 0 cm (0 in)

Volleyball information
- Position: Outside hitter

Career
Years	Teams
1998–2003; 2003–2005; 2005–2006; 2006–2008; 2008–2017	MGTU Moscow; Dinamo Moscow; Ural Ufa; Iskra Odintsovo; Belogorie Belgorod

National team
2002–2014	Russia
Honours
Representing Russia
Men's volleyball
Olympic Games
Gold medal – first place	2012 London
Bronze medal – third place	2004 Athens
World Cup
Gold medal – first place	2011 Japan
World League
Gold medal – first place	2002 Belo Horizonte
Gold medal – first place	2011 Gdańsk
Silver medal – second place	2010 Cordoba
European Championship
Silver medal – second place	2005 Serbia and Montenegro/Italy
European League
Gold medal – first place	2005 Russia
Silver medal – second place	2004 Czech Republic
- Last updated: 29 December 2017

Taras Yurevich Khtey (Ukrainian: Тарас Юрійович Хтей, Russian: Тарас Юрьевич Хтей, born 22 May 1982) is a Russian volleyball player and a member of Russia men's national volleyball team.

== Biography ==
He was born in Lviv Oblast, Ukrainian SSR.

In 2004, he was part of the Russian team which won the bronze medal in the Olympic tournament, and, with the same team, he won the gold medal at the 2012 Summer Olympics in London after initially trailing 0:2 to Brazil in the finals. In 2011, as a part of the national team, Khtey won the World League and the World Cup.
