= Gennady Shipulin =

Russian volleyball coach (born 1954)

Personal information
- Full name: Gennady Yakovlevich Shipulin
- Born: 29 April 1954 (age 72); Belgorod, USSR

Gennady Yakovlevich Shipulin (Russian: Генна́дий Я́ковлевич Шипу́лин; born 29 April 1954) is a Russian volleyball coach, president and chief coach (from the early 1990s until 29 April 2018) of VC Belogorie, Vice-President of the Russian Volleyball Federation. Merited Coach of Russia. Candidate of pedagogical sciences (2002).

From 1998 to 2004, Gennady Shipulin led the team in Russia.
