= Volleyball at the 2012 Summer Olympics =

Coordinates: 51.5556°N 0.2797°W

Volleyball at the Games of the XXX Olympiad
- Pictograms for indoor (left) and beach volleyball (right)
- Venue: Earls Court Exhibition Centre (indoor); Horse Guards Parade (beach)
- Dates: 28 July – 12 August 2012

The volleyball tournaments at the 2012 Olympic Games in London were played between 28 July and 12 August.

The indoor volleyball competition took place at Earls Court Exhibition Centre, in west London, and the beach volleyball tournament was held at Horse Guards Parade in central London.

== Events ==
Four sets of medals were awarded in the following events:

- Indoor volleyball – men (12 teams)
- Indoor volleyball – women (12 teams)
- Beach volleyball – men (24 teams)
- Beach volleyball – women (24 teams)

== Qualifying criteria ==
Each National Olympic Committee was allowed to enter one men's and one women's qualified team in the volleyball tournaments and two men's and two women's qualified teams in the beach volleyball.

=== Men's indoor volleyball qualification ===
Details of the men's qualification follow:

Means of qualification	Date	Host	Vacancies	Qualified
Host Country	—	—	1	Great Britain
2011 World Cup	20 November – 4 December 2011	Japan	3	Russia
2011 World Cup	20 November – 4 December 2011	Japan	3	Poland
2011 World Cup	20 November – 4 December 2011	Japan	3	Brazil
African Qualifier	17–21 January 2012	(Cameroon) Yaoundé	1	Tunisia
North American Qualifier	7–12 May 2012	(United States) Long Beach	1	United States
European Qualifier	8–13 May 2012	(Bulgaria) Sofia	1	Italy
South American Qualifier	11–13 May 2012	(Argentina) Burzaco	1	Argentina
1st World Qualifier	1–10 June 2012	(Japan) Tokyo	1	Serbia
Asian Qualifier*	1–10 June 2012	(Japan) Tokyo	1	Australia
2nd World Qualifier	8–10 June 2012	(Bulgaria) Sofia	1	Bulgaria
3rd World Qualifier	8–10 June 2012	(Germany) Berlin	1	Germany
Total			12	

* The Asian Qualifier was combined with the 1st World Qualifier. The first place team of the tournament qualified as the 1st World Qualifier winners, while the best Asian team except the 1st World Qualifier winners qualified as the Asian Qualifier winners.

=== Women's indoor volleyball qualification ===
Details of the women's qualification follow:

Means of qualification	Date	Host	Vacancies	Qualified
Host country	—	—	1	Great Britain
2011 World Cup	4–18 November 2011	Japan	3	Italy
2011 World Cup	4–18 November 2011	Japan	3	United States
2011 World Cup	4–18 November 2011	Japan	3	China
African Qualifier	2–4 February 2012	(Algeria) Blida	1	Algeria
North American Qualifier	29 Apr–5 May 2012	(Mexico) Tijuana	1	Dominican Republic
European Qualifier	1–6 May 2012	(Turkey) Ankara	1	Turkey
South American Qualifier	9–13 May 2012	(Brazil) São Carlos	1	Brazil
World Qualifier	19–27 May 2012	(Japan) Tokyo	3	Russia
World Qualifier	19–27 May 2012	(Japan) Tokyo	3	South Korea
World Qualifier	19–27 May 2012	(Japan) Tokyo	3	Serbia
Asian Qualifier	19–27 May 2012	(Japan) Tokyo	1	Japan
Total			12	

- The Asian Qualification Tournament was combined with the World Qualification Tournament. The first 3 place teams of the tournament won the Olympic spots as the winners of the World Qualification Tournament while the best Asian team except the top 3 winners qualify as the Asian Qualification Tournament winners.

=== Men's beach volleyball qualification ===
Means of qualification	Vacancies	Qualified
FIVB Beach Volleyball Olympic Ranking (as of 17 June 2012)	16	Brazil; United States; Germany; Netherlands; Poland; United States; Brazil; Germany; Spain; China; Switzerland; Czech Republic; Latvia; Latvia; Italy; Switzerland
2010–12 Continental Beach Volleyball Cup (confirmed on 2 July 2012)	5	Venezuela (South America); South Africa (Africa); Canada (North America); Japan (Asia/Oceania); Norway (Europe)
Beach Volleyball World Cup Final Olympic Qualification (26 June – 1 July 2012)	2	Austria; Russia
Host nation	1	Great Britain
Total	24	

=== Women's beach volleyball qualification ===
Means of qualification	Vacancies	Qualified
FIVB Beach Volleyball Olympic Ranking (as of 17 June 2012)	16	Brazil; China; United States; Brazil; United States; Netherlands; Italy; Germany; Czech Republic; Spain; Germany; Switzerland; Austria; Australia; Czech Republic; Greece
2010–12 Continental Beach Volleyball Cup (confirmed on 2 July 2012)	5	Mauritius (Africa); Argentina (South America); Russia (Europe); Canada (North America); Australia (Asia/Oceania)
Beach Volleyball World Cup Final Olympic Qualification (26 June – 1 July 2012)	2	Netherlands; Russia
Host nation	1	Great Britain
Total	24	

== Medal summary ==
=== Medal table ===
Rank	Nation	Gold	Silver	Bronze	Total
1	Brazil	1	2	1	4
2	United States	1	2	0	3
3	Germany	1	0	0	1
3	Russia	1	0	0	1
5	Italy	0	0	1	1
5	Japan	0	0	1	1
5	Latvia	0	0	1	1
Totals (7 entries)		4	4	4	12

=== Medalists ===
Event	Gold	Silver	Bronze
Men's indoor	Russia; Nikolay Apalikov; Taras Khtey (c); Sergey Grankin; Sergey Tetyukhin; Aleksandr Sokolov; Yury Berezhko; Aleksandr Butko; Dmitriy Muserskiy; Dmitriy Ilinikh; Maxim Mikhaylov; Aleksandr Volkov; Aleksey Obmochaev	Brazil; Bruno Rezende; Wallace de Souza; Sidnei Santos; Leandro Vissotto Neves; Gilberto Godoy Filho (c); Murilo Endres; Sérgio Santos; Thiago Alves; Rodrigo Santana; Lucas Saatkamp; Ricardo Garcia; Dante Amaral	Italy; Cristian Savani (c); Luigi Mastrangelo; Simone Parodi; Samuele Papi; Michal Lasko; Ivan Zaytsev; Dante Boninfante; Dragan Travica; Alessandro Fei; Emanuele Birarelli; Andrea Bari; Andrea Giovi
Women's indoor	Brazil; Fabiana Claudino (c); Dani Lins; Paula Pequeno; Adenízia da Silva; Thaísa Menezes; Jaqueline Carvalho; Fernanda Ferreira; Tandara Caixeta; Natália Pereira; Sheilla Castro; Fabiana de Oliveira; Fernanda Garay	United States; Danielle Scott-Arruda; Tayyiba Haneef-Park; Lindsey Berg (c); Tamari Miyashiro; Nicole Davis; Jordan Larson; Megan Hodge; Christa Harmotto; Logan Tom; Foluke Akinradewo; Courtney Thompson; Destinee Hooker	Japan; Hitomi Nakamichi; Yoshie Takeshita; Mai Yamaguchi; Erika Araki (c); Kaori Inoue; Maiko Kano; Yuko Sano; Ai Otomo; Risa Shinnabe; Saori Sakoda; Yukiko Ebata; Saori Kimura
Men's beach	Julius Brink and Jonas Reckermann; Germany	Alison Cerutti and Emanuel Rego; Brazil	Mārtiņš Pļaviņš and Jānis Šmēdiņš; Latvia
Women's beach	Kerri Walsh Jennings and Misty May-Treanor; United States	Jennifer Kessy and April Ross; United States	Juliana Felisberta and Larissa França; Brazil
