= Volleyball at the 2012 Summer Olympics – Men's qualification =

2012 Volleyball at the Summer Olympics – Men's qualification
- Dates: 13 August 2011 – 10 June 2012
- Teams: 29 (from 5 confederations)

The qualification for the 2012 Men's Olympic Volleyball Tournament was held from 13 August 2011 to 10 June 2012.

== Qualification summary ==
Means of qualification	Date	Host	Vacancies	Qualified
Host country	—N/a	—N/a	1	Great Britain
2011 World Cup	20 November – 4 December 2011	Japan	3	Russia
2011 World Cup	20 November – 4 December 2011	Japan	3	Poland
2011 World Cup	20 November – 4 December 2011	Japan	3	Brazil
African Qualifier	17–21 January 2012	(Cameroon) Yaoundé	1	Tunisia
North American Qualifier	7–12 May 2012	(United States) Long Beach	1	United States
European Qualifier	8–13 May 2012	(Bulgaria) Sofia	1	Italy
South American Qualifier	11–13 May 2012	(Argentina) Burzaco	1	Argentina
1st World Qualifier	1–10 June 2012	(Japan) Tokyo	1	Serbia
Asian Qualifier*	1–10 June 2012	(Japan) Tokyo	1	Australia
2nd World Qualifier	8–10 June 2012	(Bulgaria) Sofia	1	Bulgaria
3rd World Qualifier	8–10 June 2012	(Germany) Berlin	1	Germany
Total			12	

* The Asian Qualifier was combined with the 1st World Qualifier. The first place team of the tournament qualified as the 1st World Qualifier winners, while the best Asian team except the 1st World Qualifier winners qualified as the Asian Qualifier winners.

== Means of qualification ==
Qualified for the 2012 Summer Olympics

== Host country ==
FIVB reserved a vacancy for the 2012 Summer Olympics host country to participate in the tournament.

- Great Britain

== 2011 World Cup ==
- Venues: Japan
- Dates: 20 November – 4 December 2011
- The top three teams qualified for the 2012 Summer Olympics.

Rank	Team
1st place, gold medalist(s)	Russia
2nd place, silver medalist(s)	Poland
3rd place, bronze medalist(s)	Brazil
4	Italy
5	Cuba
6	United States
7	Argentina
8	Serbia
9	Iran
10	Japan
11	China
12	Egypt

== Continental qualification tournaments ==
=== Africa ===
- Venue: Palais des Sports de Warda, Yaoundé, Cameroon
- Dates: 17–21 January 2012
- All times are West Africa Time (UTC+01:00).
- The winners qualified for the 2012 Summer Olympics.

Pos	Team	Pld	W	L	Pts	SW	SL	SR	SPW	SPL	SPR
1	Tunisia	4	4	0	8	12	2	6.000	341	297	1.148
2	Egypt	4	3	1	7	10	5	2.000	362	307	1.179
3	Cameroon	4	2	2	6	9	8	1.125	381	371	1.027
4	Algeria	4	1	3	5	5	9	0.556	309	318	0.972
5	Ghana	4	0	4	4	0	12	0.000	200	300	0.667

Date	Time		Score		Set 1	Set 2	Set 3	Set 4	Set 5	Total
17 Jan	16:00	Egypt	1–3	Tunisia	23–25	25–16	27–29	23–25		98–95
17 Jan	18:00	Cameroon	3–0	Ghana	25–18	25–16	25–12			75–46
18 Jan	16:00	Ghana	0–3	Egypt	21–25	8–25	17–25			46–75
18 Jan	18:00	Algeria	2–3	Cameroon	24–26	25–19	22–25	27–25	18–20	116–115
19 Jan	16:00	Egypt	3–0	Algeria	25–21	25–19	26–24			76–64
19 Jan	18:00	Tunisia	3–0	Ghana	25–22	25–13	25–21			75–56
20 Jan	16:00	Algeria	0–3	Tunisia	17–25	16–25	21–25			54–75
20 Jan	18:00	Cameroon	2–3	Egypt	25–27	25–23	25–23	20–25	7–15	102–113
21 Jan	14:00	Ghana	0–3	Algeria	15–25	19–25	18–25			52–75
21 Jan	18:00	Tunisia	3–1	Cameroon	21–25	25–20	25–23	25–21		96–89

=== Asia and Oceania ===
The 2012 Asian Olympic Qualification Tournament combined with 2012 1st World Olympic Qualification Tournament. The hosts Japan and the top four ranked teams except Japan from the 2011 Asian Championship competed in the tournament. The top ranked among the five teams except the 2012 1st World Olympic Qualification Tournament winners qualified for the 2012 Summer Olympics as the 2012 Asian Olympic Qualification Tournament winners.

=== Europe ===
- Venue: Armeets Arena, Sofia, Bulgaria
- Dates: 8–13 May 2012
- The winners qualified for the 2012 Summer Olympics.

Rank	Team
1	Italy
2	Germany
3	Bulgaria
3	Serbia
5	Slovakia
5	Spain
7	Finland
7	Slovenia

=== North America ===
- Venue: Walter Pyramid, Long Beach, United States
- Dates: 7–12 May 2012
- The winners qualified for the 2012 Summer Olympics.

Rank	Team
1	United States
2	Canada
3	Cuba
4	Puerto Rico
5	Mexico
6	Dominican Republic
7	Trinidad and Tobago
8	Costa Rica

=== South America ===
- Venue: Polideportivo Almirante Brown, Burzaco, Argentina
- Dates: 11–13 May 2012
- All times are Argentina Time (UTC−03:00).
- The winners qualified for the 2012 Summer Olympics.

Pos	Team	Pld	W	L	Pts	SW	SL	SR	SPW	SPL	SPR
1	Argentina	3	3	0	9	9	0	MAX	227	162	1.401
2	Venezuela	3	2	1	6	6	4	1.500	237	213	1.113
3	Colombia	3	1	2	2	4	8	0.500	231	272	0.849
4	Chile	3	0	3	1	2	9	0.222	204	252	0.810

Date	Time		Score		Set 1	Set 2	Set 3	Set 4	Set 5	Total
11 May	18:10	Venezuela	3–1	Colombia	25–17	24–26	25–15	25–15		99–73
11 May	21:10	Chile	0–3	Argentina	16–25	13–25	14–25			43–75
12 May	18:10	Venezuela	3–0	Chile	25–22	25–21	25–20			75–63
12 May	21:40	Argentina	3–0	Colombia	25–21	25–15	25–20			75–56
13 May	18:00	Colombia	3–2	Chile	20–25	17–25	25–23	25–17	15–8	102–98
13 May	21:10	Argentina	3–0	Venezuela	25–19	25–19	27–25			77–63

== World qualification tournaments ==
Qualified teams

- Hosts
  - Japan
  - Italy ^{1}
  - Germany
- Qualified through the 2011 Asian Championship.
  - Iran *
  - China *
  - South Korea *
  - Australia *
  - India
  - Pakistan
- Qualified through the FIVB World Ranking as of 4 January 2012.
  - Egypt (as CAVB 1 – No. 11)
  - Serbia (as CEV 1 – No. 7)
  - France (as CEV 2 – No. 21)
  - Czech Republic (as CEV 3 – No. 23)
  - Cuba (as NORCECA 1 – No. 5)
  - Puerto Rico (as NORCECA 2 – No. 17)
  - Venezuela (as CSV 1 – No. 16)

* The top four teams from 2011 Asian Championship were predetermined to be in 1st tournament in Japan.

^1 – Italy, which were previously announced as hosts of 2nd tournament, won the 2020 European Olympic Qualification Tournament and secured a direct berth. Bulgaria replaced Italy as hosts.

=== 1st tournament ===
- Venue: Tokyo Metropolitan Gymnasium, Tokyo, Japan
- Dates: 1–10 June 2012
- All times are Japan Standard Time (UTC+09:00).
- The winners and the best Asian team except the winners qualified for the 2012 Summer Olympics.

Pos	Team	Pld	W	L	Pts	SW	SL	SR	SPW	SPL	SPR
1	Serbia	7	7	0	21	21	1	21.000	552	426	1.296
2	Australia	7	5	2	15	15	8	1.875	527	470	1.121
3	Iran	7	5	2	14	16	9	1.778	612	547	1.119
4	Japan	7	4	3	11	13	12	1.083	579	567	1.021
5	China	7	3	4	11	13	14	0.929	575	599	0.960
6	South Korea	7	3	4	8	13	16	0.813	593	635	0.934
7	Venezuela	7	1	6	3	4	18	0.222	453	542	0.836
8	Puerto Rico	7	0	7	1	4	21	0.190	489	594	0.823

Date	Time		Score		Set 1	Set 2	Set 3	Set 4	Set 5	Total	Report
1 Jun	11:10	Australia	3–0	Venezuela	25–14	25–22	25–18			75–54	P2 P3
1 Jun	13:40	Puerto Rico	0–3	China	23–25	19–25	17–25			59–75	P2 P3
1 Jun	16:10	Iran	3–0	South Korea	25–17	25–18	25–16			75–51	P2 P3
1 Jun	19:15	Japan	0–3	Serbia	19–25	23–25	16–25			58–75	P2 P3
2 Jun	11:10	Australia	3–0	Puerto Rico	25–14	25–19	25–20			75–53	P2 P3
2 Jun	13:40	China	2–3	Iran	25–23	21–25	31–29	15–25	13–15	105–117	P2 P3
2 Jun	16:30	South Korea	1–3	Serbia	23–25	22–25	25–17	12–25		82–92	P2 P3
2 Jun	19:15	Japan	3–0	Venezuela	25–20	25–20	32–30			82–70	P2 P3
5 Jun	11:10	Puerto Rico	0–3	Venezuela	20–25	20–25	21–25			61–75	P2 P3
5 Jun	13:40	Iran	1–3	Australia	25–17	18–25	18–25	23–25		84–92	P2 P3
5 Jun	16:10	Serbia	3–0	China	25–15	25–13	25–21			75–49	P2 P3
5 Jun	19:15	Japan	3–2	South Korea	25–22	24–26	25–20	19–25	15–6	108–99	P2 P3
6 Jun	11:10	Puerto Rico	1–3	Iran	24–26	16–25	25–22	20–25		85–98	P2 P3
6 Jun	13:40	Australia	0–3	Serbia	18–25	19–25	18–25			55–75	P2 P3
6 Jun	16:10	Venezuela	0–3	South Korea	25–27	22–25	15–25			62–77	P2 P3
6 Jun	19:15	Japan	1–3	China	19–25	27–25	18–25	18–25		82–100	P2 P3
7 Jun	11:10	Iran	3–0	Venezuela	25–16	25–16	25–20			75–52	P2 P3
7 Jun	13:40	Serbia	3–0	Puerto Rico	25–19	25–17	25–18			75–54	P2 P3
7 Jun	16:10	South Korea	3–2	China	25–21	22–25	25–20	14–25	15–13	101–104	P2 P3
7 Jun	19:15	Japan	3–0	Australia	25–22	25–23	25–12			75–57	P2 P3
9 Jun	11:10	Iran	0–3	Serbia	28–30	28–30	22–25			78–85	P2 P3
9 Jun	13:40	Venezuela	1–3	China	18–25	26–28	25–19	21–25		90–97	P2 P3
9 Jun	16:10	Australia	3–1	South Korea	25–22	25–17	23–25	25–20		98–84	P2 P3
9 Jun	19:15	Japan	3–1	Puerto Rico	22–25	25–21	25–19	25–16		97–81	P2 P3
10 Jun	11:10	Serbia	3–0	Venezuela	25–14	25–13	25–23			75–50	P2 P3
10 Jun	13:40	China	0–3	Australia	12–25	20–25	13–25			45–75	P2 P3
10 Jun	16:10	South Korea	3–2	Puerto Rico	15–25	25–18	19–25	25–16	15–12	99–96	P2 P3
10 Jun	19:15	Japan	0–3	Iran	22–25	33–35	22–25			77–85	P2 P3

=== 2nd tournament ===
- Venue: Armeets Arena, Sofia, Bulgaria
- Dates: 8–10 June 2012
- All times are Eastern European Summer Time (UTC+03:00).
- The winners qualified for the 2012 Summer Olympics.

Pos	Team	Pld	W	L	Pts	SW	SL	SR	SPW	SPL	SPR
1	Bulgaria	3	3	0	9	9	2	4.500	273	216	1.264
2	France	3	2	1	6	7	5	1.400	284	263	1.080
3	Egypt	3	1	2	3	5	6	0.833	230	247	0.931
4	Pakistan	3	0	3	0	1	9	0.111	186	247	0.753

Date	Time		Score		Set 1	Set 2	Set 3	Set 4	Set 5	Total	Report
8 Jun	17:30	Egypt	1–3	France	22–25	25–18	15–25	21–25		83–93	P2 P3
8 Jun	20:30	Pakistan	0–3	Bulgaria	17–25	12–25	21–25			50–75	P2 P3
9 Jun	17:30	Egypt	3–0	Pakistan	25–13	25–22	26–24			76–59	P2 P3
9 Jun	20:30	France	1–3	Bulgaria	19–25	28–26	23–25	25–27		95–103	P2 P3
10 Jun	17:30	Pakistan	1–3	France	25–21	20–25	19–25	13–25		77–96	P2 P3
10 Jun	20:30	Bulgaria	3–1	Egypt	25–16	25–18	20–25	25–12		95–71	P2 P3

=== 3rd tournament ===
- Venue: Max-Schmeling-Halle, Berlin, Germany
- Dates: 8–10 June 2012
- All times are Central European Summer Time (UTC+02:00).
- The winners qualified for the 2012 Summer Olympics.

Pos	Team	Pld	W	L	Pts	SW	SL	SR	SPW	SPL	SPR
1	Germany	3	3	0	8	9	3	3.000	281	247	1.138
2	Cuba	3	2	1	7	8	4	2.000	283	258	1.097
3	Czech Republic	3	1	2	3	5	6	0.833	262	255	1.027
4	India	3	0	3	0	0	9	0.000	159	225	0.707

Date	Time		Score		Set 1	Set 2	Set 3	Set 4	Set 5	Total	Report
8 Jun	17:10	Czech Republic	1–3	Cuba	29–27	23–25	23–25	21–25		96–102	P2 P3
8 Jun	20:10	India	0–3	Germany	16–25	19–25	15–25			50–75	P2 P3
9 Jun	15:10	India	0–3	Czech Republic	19–25	13–25	23–25			55–75	P2 P3
9 Jun	18:10	Germany	3–2	Cuba	25–21	25–17	21–25	17–25	20–18	108–106	P2 P3
10 Jun	14:30	Cuba	3–0	India	25–12	25–22	25–20			75–54	P2 P3
10 Jun	17:10	Germany	3–1	Czech Republic	25–22	23–25	25–23	25–21		98–91	P2 P3
