= Maxim Mikhaylov =

Russian volleyball player

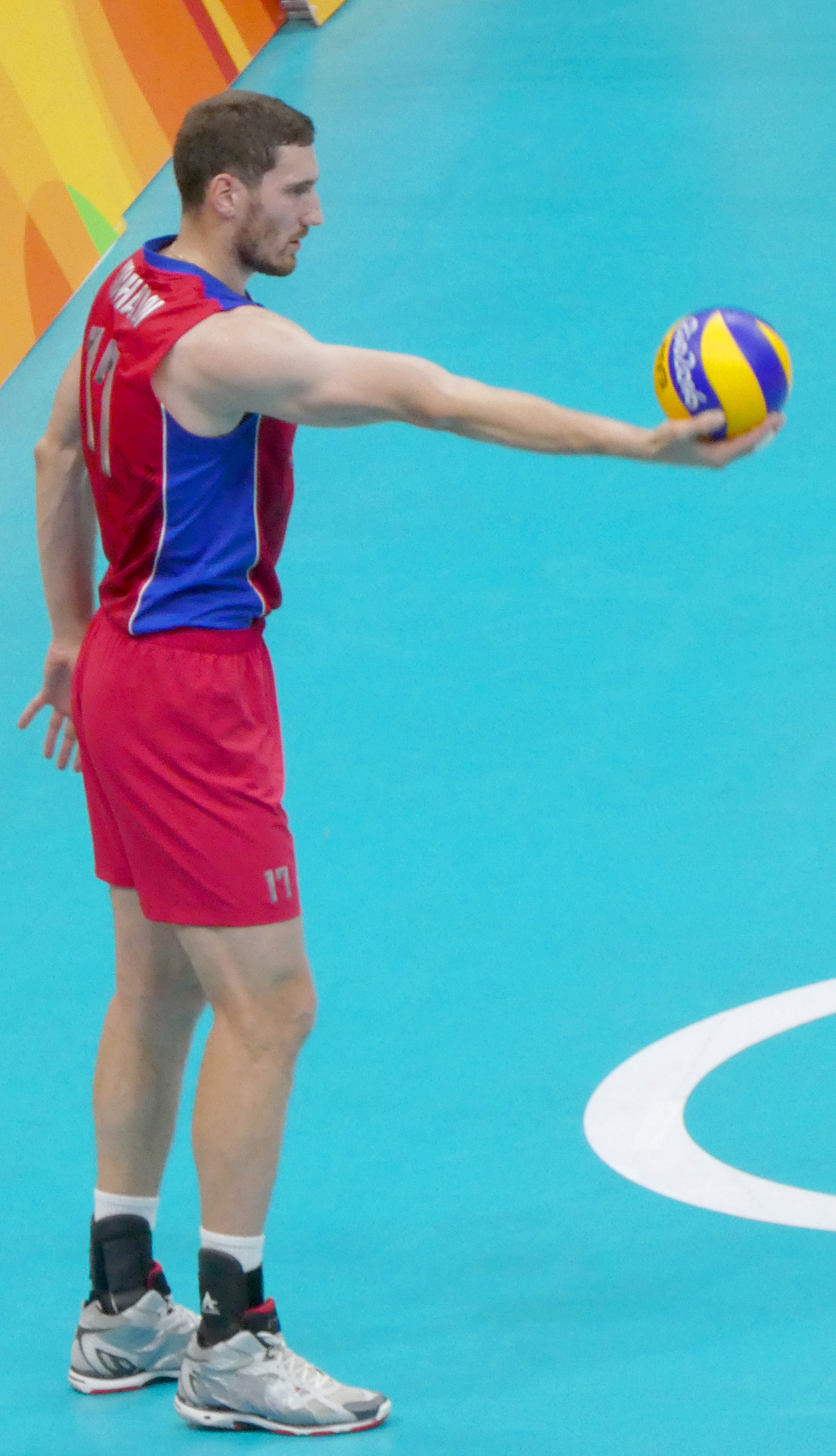
- Mikhaylov in 2016

Personal information
- Nationality: Russian
- Born: 19 March 1988 (age 38); Kuzmolovsky, Leningrad Oblast, Russian SFSR, Soviet Union
- Height: 2.02 m (6 ft 8 in)
- Weight: 103 kg (227 lb)
- Spike: 360 cm (142 in)
- Block: 340 cm (134 in)

Volleyball information
- Position: Opposite hitter
- Current club: Zenit Kazan
- Number: 18

Career
Years	Teams
2003–2010; 2010–	Yaroslavich Yaroslavl; Zenit Kazan

National team
2008–	Russia
Honours

Volleyball
Representing ROC
Olympic Games
Silver medal – second place	2020 Tokyo	Team
Representing Russia
Olympic Games
Gold medal – first place	2012 London	Team
Bronze medal – third place	2008 Beijing	Team
FIVB World Cup
Gold medal – first place	2011 Japan	Team
World Grand Champions Cup
Silver medal – second place	2013 Japan	Team
FIVB World League
Gold medal – first place	2011 Gdansk	Team
Gold medal – first place	2013 Mar del Plata	Team
Silver medal – second place	2010 Córdoba	Team
Bronze medal – third place	2008 Rio de Janeiro	Team
Bronze medal – third place	2009 Belgrade	Team
FIVB Nations League
Gold medal – first place	2018 Lille	Team
European Championship
Gold medal – first place	2013 Denmark/Poland	Team
Gold medal – first place	2017 Poland	Team
World U19 Championship
Gold medal – first place	2005 Algeria	Under-19
World U21 Championship
Silver medal – second place	2007 Morocco	Under-21
European Junior Championship
Gold medal – first place	2006 Russia	Under-20
- Last updated: 21 December 2017

Maxim Mikhaylovich Mikhaylov (Russian: Максим Михайлович Михайлов, IPA: [mɐˈksʲim mʲɪˈxaɪ̯ɫəf]; born 19 March 1988) is a Russian professional volleyball player, a member of the Russia men's national volleyball team and Russian club VC Zenit-Kazan, gold medalist at the Olympic Games London 2012, silver medalist at the Olympic Games Tokyo 2020, bronze medalist at the Olympic Games Beijing 2008, gold medalist at the World Cup 2011, European Champion 2013 and 2017 and a multiple medalist of the World League.

== Career ==
Maxim Mikhaylov started playing volleyball in the Leningrad region under the guidance of Valery Besprozvannykh. From 2003 till 2010, he performed as an outside striker for Yaroslavich Yaroslavl, a team from Yaroslavl. In 2010, he moved to Zenit Kazan.

=== National team ===
In 2008, Russia, including Mikhaylov, won the bronze medal at the 2008 Olympic Games in Beijing. Mikhaylov helped propel Russia to a 10–1 record and the World Cup 2011 gold medal following Sunday's five-set victory over silver medalist Poland. At the next Olympics, the 2012 Olympic Games in London, his team won gold. Mikhaylov was named best spiker and best scorer at the 2012 Olympics. In September 2013, his national team beat Italy in the final of the European Championship (3–1) and achieved the gold medal. He missed the early rounds of the 2013 season due to a shoulder injury and most of the 2014 season due to injuries to both ankles, which required surgery. He played at the 2016 Rio Olympics and 2020 Tokyo Olympics, winning a silver medal at the latter.

=== Club ===
In 2010, Mikhaylov joined Zenit Kazan. With Zenit, he won the CEV Champions League in 2011–12, 2014–15, 2015–16, 2016–17, and 2017–18 and was bronze medalist in World Championship Club in 2011. Mikhaylov was voted MVP in the 2016–17 CEV Champions League finals.

== Personal life ==
Mikhaylov is married to Anastasia and has a son Nikita.

== Sporting achievements ==
=== FIVB Club World Championship ===
- Doha 2011 – with Zenit Kazan
- Betim 2015 – with Zenit Kazan
- Betim 2016 – with Zenit Kazan
- Poland 2017 – with Zenit Kazan
- Brazil 2019 – with Zenit Kazan

=== CEV Champions League ===
- 2010/2011 – with Zenit Kazan
- 2011/2012 – with Zenit Kazan
- 2012/2013 – with Zenit Kazan
- 2014/2015 – with Zenit Kazan
- 2015/2016 – with Zenit Kazan
- 2016/2017 – with Zenit Kazan
- 2017/2018 – with Zenit Kazan
- 2018/2019 – with Zenit Kazan

=== National championship ===
- 2010/2011 Russian SuperCup 2010, with Zenit Kazan
- 2010/2011 Russian Championship, with Zenit Kazan
- 2011/2012 Russian SuperCup 2011, with Zenit Kazan
- 2011/2012 Russian Championship, with Zenit Kazan
- 2012/2013 Russian Championship, with Zenit Kazan
- 2013/2014 Russian Cup, with Zenit Kazan
- 2013/2014 Russian Championship, with Zenit Kazan
- 2014/2015 Russian Cup, with Zenit Kazan
- 2014/2015 Russian Championship, with Zenit Kazan
- 2015/2016 Russian SuperCup 2015, with Zenit Kazan
- 2015/2016 Russian Cup, with Zenit Kazan
- 2015/2016 Russian Championship, with Zenit Kazan
- 2016/2017 Russian SuperCup 2016, with Zenit Kazan
- 2016/2017 Russian Cup, with Zenit Kazan
- 2016/2017 Russian Championship, with Zenit Kazan
- 2017/2018 Russian SuperCup 2017, with Zenit Kazan
- 2017/2018 Russian Cup, with Zenit Kazan
- 2018/2019 Russian Championship, with Zenit Kazan

=== National team ===
- 2005 FIVB U19 World Championship
- 2007 FIVB U21 World Championship
- 2008 FIVB World League
- 2008 Olympic Games
- 2009 FIVB World League
- 2010 FIVB World League
- 2011 FIVB World League
- 2011 FIVB World Cup
- 2012 Olympic Games
- 2013 FIVB World League
- 2013 CEV European Championship
- 2017 CEV European Championship
- 2018 FIVB Nations League
- 2021 Olympic Games

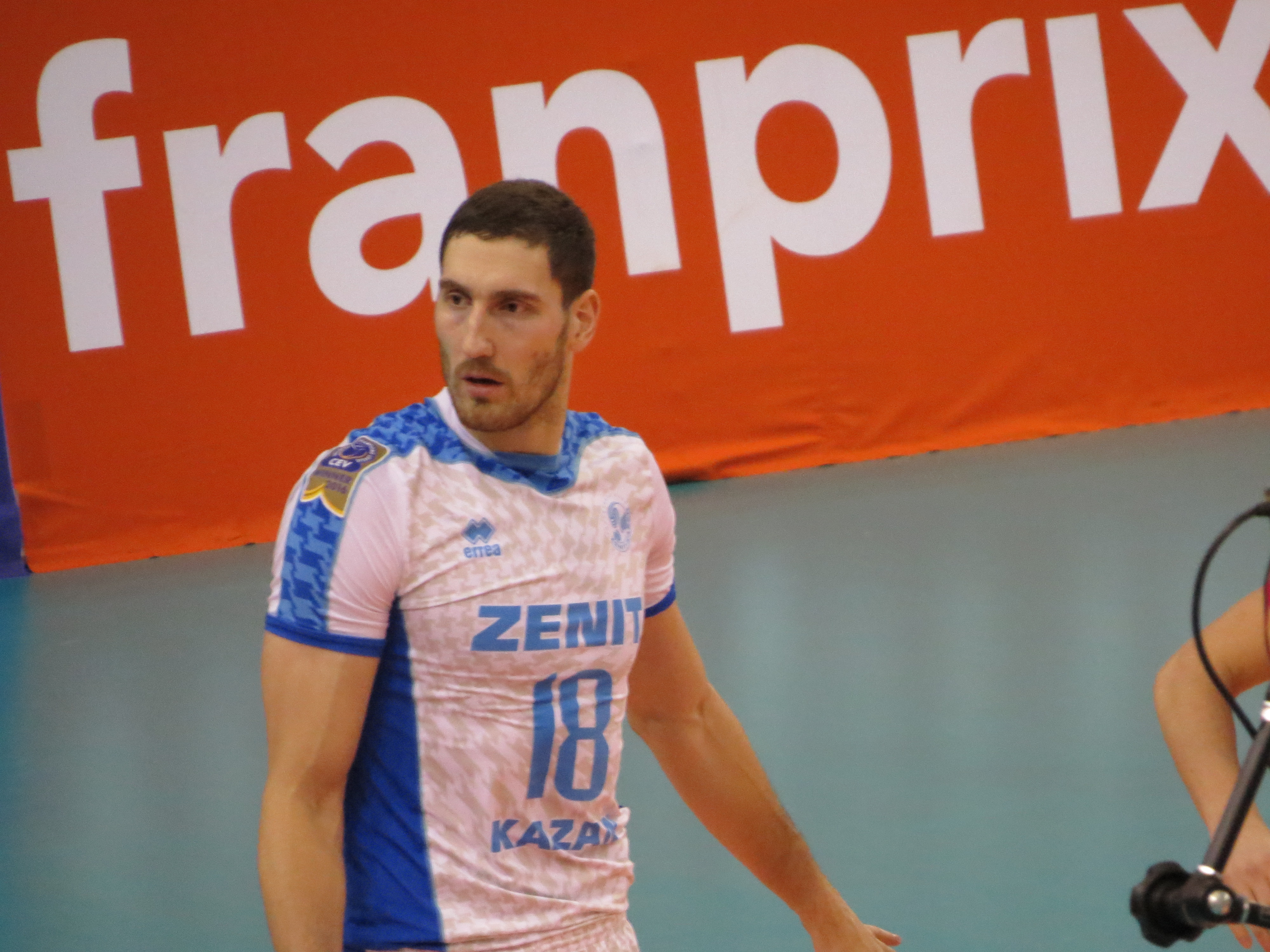
Mikhaylov at CEV Champions League 2017

=== Individual ===
- 2007 FIVB U21 World Championship – Best server
- 2010 FIVB World League – Best scorer
- 2010 FIVB World League – Best spiker
- 2010 FIVB World Championship – Best spiker
- 2011 CEV Champions League – Best scorer
- 2011 FIVB World League – Best blocker
- 2011 FIVB World League – Most valuable player
- 2011 CEV European Championship – Best scorer
- 2011 CEV European Championship – Best spiker
- 2011 FIVB World Cup – Most valuable player
- 2011 FIVB Club World Championship – Best scorer
- 2012 CEV Champions League – Best server
- 2012 CEV Champions League – Best scorer
- 2012 Olympic Games London – Best scorer
- 2012 Olympic Games London – Best spiker
- 2012 Order of Friendship
- 2014 CEV Champions League – Best opposite spiker
- 2015 CEV Champions League – Best opposite spiker
- 2016 CEV Champions League – Best opposite spiker
- 2016 Men's European qualification – Best opposite spiker
- 2017 CEV Champions League – Most valuable player
- 2017 Russian Championship – Most valuable player
- 2017 CEV European Championship – Most valuable player
- 2018 CEV Champions League – Most valuable player
- 2018 FIVB Nations League – Most valuable player
- 2021 Olympic Games Tokyo – Best opposite spiker

Awards
Preceded by (Serbia) Ivan Miljković	Best Scorer of FIVB World League; 2010	Succeeded by (Poland) Bartosz Kurek
Preceded by (Cuba) Robertlandy Simón	Best Spiker of FIVB World League; 2010	Succeeded by (Brazil) Théo Lopes
Preceded by (Poland) Mariusz Wlazły	Best Scorer of CEV Champions League; 2010/2011; 2011/2012	Succeeded by (Sweden) Marcus Nilsson
Preceded by (Russia) Sergey Tetyukhin	Best Server of CEV Champions League; 2011/2012	Succeeded by (Brazil) Felipe Fonteles
Preceded by (Russia) Dmitriy Muserskiy	Best Blocker of FIVB World League; 2011	Succeeded by (Poland) Marcin Możdżonek
Preceded by (Brazil) Murilo Endres	Most Valuable Player of FIVB World League; 2011	Succeeded by (Poland) Bartosz Kurek
Preceded by (Russia) Aleksandr Volkov	Best Spiker of CEV European Championship; 2011	Succeeded by (Italy) Luca Vettori
Preceded by (France) Antonin Rouzier	Best Scorer of CEV European Championship; 2011	Succeeded by (Serbia) Aleksandar Atanasijević
Preceded by (Argentina) Federico Pereyra	Best Scorer of FIVB Club World Championship; 2011	Succeeded by (Serbia) Aleksandar Atanasijević
Preceded by (Brazil) Gilberto Godoy Filho	Most Valuable Player of FIVB World Cup; 2011	Succeeded by (United States) Matt Anderson
Preceded by (United States) Clayton Stanley	Best Scorer; Olympic Games; London 2012	Succeeded by (Brazil) Wallace de Souza
Preceded by (Poland) Sebastian Świderski	Best Spiker; Olympic Games; London 2012	Succeeded by (Brazil) Wallace de Souza
Preceded by (France) Antonin Rouzier	Best Spiker of CEV Champions League; 2013/2014	Succeeded by Not Awarded
Preceded by Not Awarded	Best Opposite Spiker of CEV Champions League; 2014/2015; 2015/2016	Succeeded by (Serbia) Aleksandar Atanasijević
Preceded by (Cuba) Wilfredo León	Most Valuable Player of CEV Champions League; 2016/2017; 2017/2018	Succeeded by (Italy) Osmany Juantorena
Preceded by (France) Antonin Rouzier	Most Valuable Player of CEV European Championship; 2017	Succeeded by (Serbia) Uroš Kovačević
Preceded by Not Awarded	Most Valuable Player of FIVB Nations League; 2018	Succeeded by (United States) Matt Anderson
Preceded by (Brazil) Wallace de Souza	Best Opposite Spiker of Olympic Games; Tokyo 2020	Succeeded by Incumbent
Olympic Games
Preceded by Sergey Tetyukhin (for Russia)	Flagbearer for ROC (with Sofya Velikaya); Tokyo 2020	Succeeded by Incumbent
