= Aleksandr Volkov (volleyball) =

Russian volleyball player

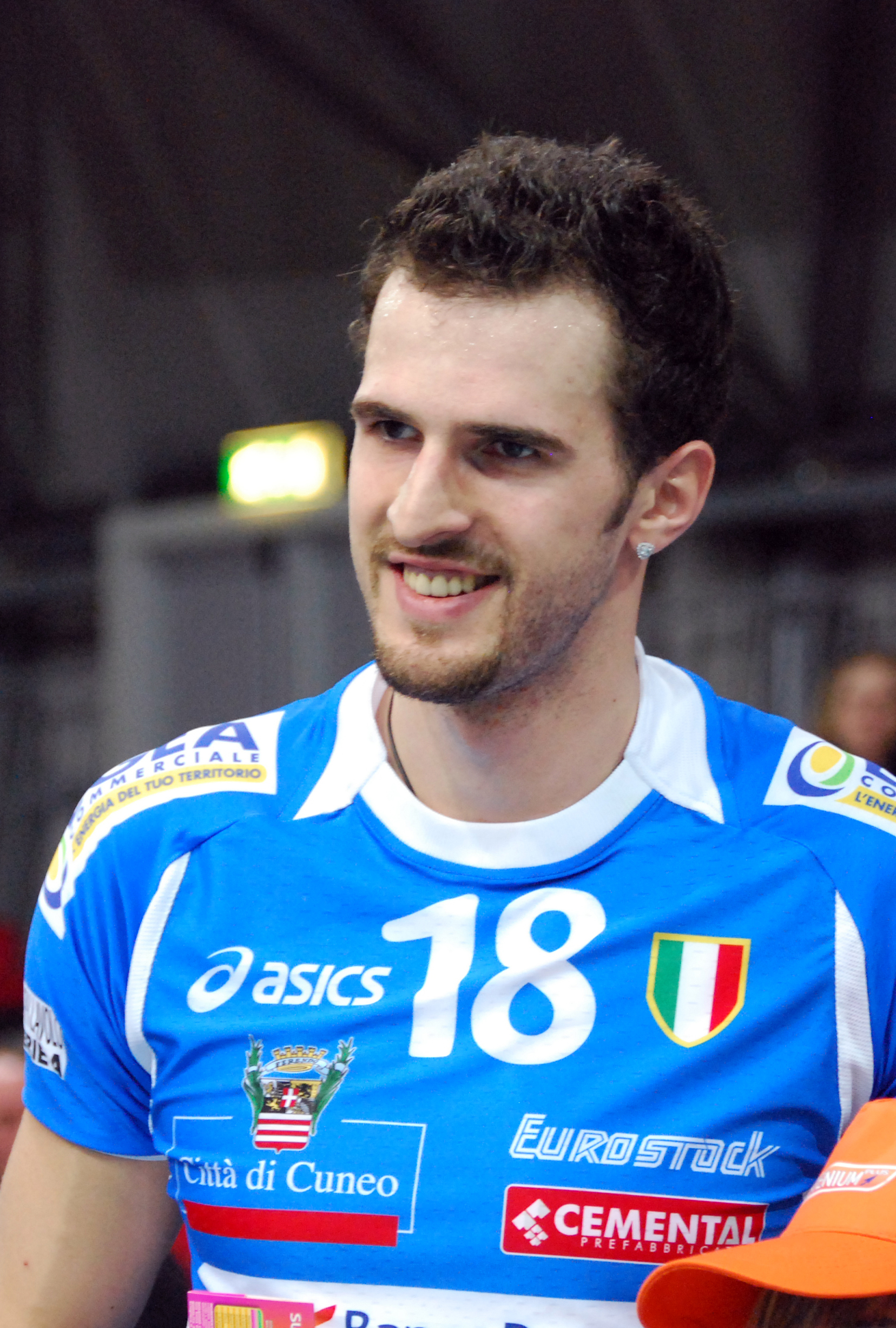

Personal information
- Full name: Aleksandr Aleksandrovich Volkov
- Nationality: Russian
- Born: February 14, 1985 (age 41); Moscow, RSFSR, USSR
- Height: 2.10 m (6 ft 11 in)
- Weight: 100 kg (220 lb)
- Spike: 360 cm (142 in)
- Block: 335 cm (132 in)

Coaching information
Previous teams coached
Years	Teams
2023–	Belogorie

Volleyball information
- Position: Middle blocker
- Current club: Belogorie (head coach)

Career
Years	Teams
2002–2004; 2004–2005; 2005–2010; 2010–2011; 2011–2015; 2015–2016; 2016; 2017; 2017–2019; 2019–2020; 2020–2023	Dinamo Moscow; Luch Moscow; Dinamo Moscow; Bre Banca Lannutti Cuneo; Zenit Kazan; Ural Ufa; Gazprom-Ugra Surgut; Dinamo Moscow; Zenit Saint Petersburg; Dynamo-LO; Zenit Kazan

National team
2004–2016	Russia
Honours
Representing Russia
Men's volleyball
Olympic Games
Gold medal – first place	2012 London
Bronze medal – third place	2008 Beijing
World Cup
Gold medal – first place	2011 Japan
Silver medal – second place	2007 Japan
World League
Gold medal – first place	2011 Gdansk
Silver medal – second place	2007 Katowice
Silver medal – second place	2010 Córdoba
Bronze medal – third place	2008 Rio de Janeiro
Bronze medal – third place	2009 Belgrade
European Championship
Silver medal – second place	2007 Russia
- Last updated: 20 June 2023

Aleksandr Aleksandrovich Volkov (Russian: Александр Александрович Волков; born 14 February 1985) is a former Russian volleyball player, a member of Russia men's national volleyball team. He was 2012 Olympic Champion, bronze medalist of the 2008 Olympic Games, gold medalist of the 2011 World Cup, silver medalist of the 2007 European Championship, multimedalist of the World League. Recently he is a head coach of Belogorie.

== Biography ==
With Dynamo Moscow he won the bronze medal at the Men's CEV Champions League 2006–07 and was awarded the Final Four "Best Blocker".

Volkov competed at the 2008 Summer Olympics, where Russia claimed the bronze medal. He and the Russian Team won the gold medal at the 2012 Summer Olympics in London.

== Sporting achievements ==
=== Clubs ===
==== CEV Champions League ====
- 2006/2007 - with Dynamo Moscow
- 2009/2010 - with Dynamo Moscow
- 2011/2012 - with Zenit Kazan
- 2012/2013 - with Zenit Kazan
- 2014/2015 - with Zenit Kazan

==== FIVB Club World Championship ====
- 2011 Qatar - with Zenit Kazan

==== National championships ====
- 2003/2004 Russian Championship, with Dynamo Moscow
- 2005/2006 Russian Cup, with Dynamo Moscow
- 2005/2006 Russian Championship, with Dynamo Moscow
- 2006/2007 Russian Championship, with Dynamo Moscow
- 2007/2008 Russian Cup, with Dynamo Moscow
- 2007/2008 Russian Championship, with Dynamo Moscow
- 2009/2010 Russian Championship, with Dynamo Moscow
- 2010/2011 Italian SuperCup 2010, with Piemonte Volley
- 2010/2011 Italian Cup, with Piemonte Volley
- 2010/2011 Italian Championship, with Piemonte Volley
- 2011/2012 Russian SuperCup 2011, with Zenit Kazan
- 2011/2012 Russian Championship, with Zenit Kazan
- 2012/2013 Russian Championship, with Zenit Kazan
- 2012/2013 Russian SuperCup 2012, with Zenit Kazan
- 2013/2014 Russian Championship, with Zenit Kazan
- 2014/2015 Russian Championship, with Zenit Kazan
- 2014/2015 Russian Cup, with Zenit Kazan

=== National team ===
- 2007 FIVB World League
- 2007 CEV European Championship
- 2007 FIVB World Cup
- 2008 FIVB World League
- 2008 Olympic Games
- 2009 FIVB World League
- 2010 FIVB World League
- 2011 FIVB World League
- 2011 FIVB World Cup
- 2012 Olympic Games

=== Individually ===
- 2007 CEV Champions League - Best Blocker
- 2009 CEV European Championship - Best Spiker
- 2011 Italian SuperCup - Most Valuable Player
- 2011 Memorial of Hubert Jerzy Wagner - Best Server

Awards
Preceded by (Brazil) Gustavo Endres	Best Blocker of CEV Champions League; 2006/2007	Succeeded by (Russia) Aleksandr Bogomolov
Preceded by (Russia) Yury Berezhko	Best Spiker of CEV European Championship; 2009	Succeeded by (Russia) Maxim Mikhaylov
