= Andrea Bari =

Italian volleyball player (born 1980)

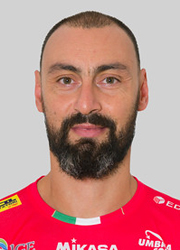

Personal information
- Nationality: Italian
- Born: 5 March 1980 (age 46); Senigallia, Italy
- Height: 1.85 m (6 ft 1 in)
- Weight: 81 kg (179 lb)
- Spike: 327 cm (129 in)
- Block: 310 cm (122 in)

Volleyball information
- Position: Libero
- Current team: Monini Marconi Spoleto
- Number: 16

Career
Years	Teams
1996–1999; 1999–2000; 2000–2001; 2001–2002; 2002–2003; 2003–2005; 2005–2013; 2013–2016; 2016–2017; 2017–	Falconara Volley; Trasimeno Volley; Zinella Bologne; M. Grecia Taranto; Umbria Volley; AS Capurso Gioia; Trentino Diatec; PRC Ravenna; Sir Safety Perugia; Monini Marconi Spoleto

National team
2010–2013	Italy (57)
Honours
Men's volleyball
Representing Italy
Olympic Games
Bronze medal – third place	2012 London
European Championship
Silver medal – second place	2011 Austria/Czech Republic
- Last updated: 2 January 2018

Andrea Bari (born 5 March 1980) is an Italian volleyball player, a member of Italy men's national volleyball team in 2010–2013 and Italian club Monini Marconi Spoleto, bronze medalist of the Olympic Games London 2012, silver medalist of the 2011 European Championship, three-time Italian Champion. He is a multiple winner of the CEV Champions League and FIVB Volleyball Men's Club World Championship with the Italian club Trentino Volley.

== Career ==
=== National team ===
In 2011 Italy, including Bari, won a silver medal of the European Championship 2011 after lost match with Serbia. Bari received individual award for the Best Libero. In next year Italian team won bronze at Olympics - London 2012 in 3rd place match against Bulgaria.

== Sporting achievements ==
=== CEV Champions League ===
- 2008/2009 - with Itas Diatec Trentino
- 2009/2010 - with Itas Diatec Trentino
- 2010/2011 - with Itas Diatec Trentino
- 2011/2012 - with Itas Diatec Trentino
- 2016/2017 - with Sir Sicoma Colussi Perugia

=== FIVB Club World Championship ===
- Qatar 2009 - with Itas Diatec Trentino
- Qatar 2010 - with Itas Diatec Trentino
- Qatar 2011 - with Itas Diatec Trentino

=== National championship ===
- 2007/2008 Italian Championship, with Itas Diatec Trentino
- 2008/2009 Italian Championship, with Itas Diatec Trentino
- 2009/2010 Italian Cup Serie A, with Itas Diatec Trentino
- 2009/2010 Italian Championship, with Itas Diatec Trentino
- 2010/2011 Italian Championship, with Itas Diatec Trentino
- 2011/2012 Italian Cup Serie A, with Itas Diatec Trentino
- 2011/2012 Italian Championship, with Itas Diatec Trentino
- 2012/2013 Italian Championship, with Itas Diatec Trentino

=== National team ===
- 2011 CEV European Championship
- 2012 Olympic Games

=== Individually ===
- 2010 CEV Champions League - Best Libero
- 2011 CEV Champions League - Best Libero
- 2011 CEV European Championship - Best Libero

Awards
Preceded by (Russia) Alexey Verbov	Best Libero of CEV Champions League; 2009/2010; 2010/2011	Succeeded by (Russia) Alexey Obmochaev
Preceded by (France) Hubert Henno	Best Libero of CEV European Championship; 2011	Succeeded by (Russia) Alexey Verbov
