= 2010–12 Continental Beach Volleyball Cup =

The 2010–12 Continental Beach Volleyball Cup (CBVC) is the qualification tournament for the beach volleyball tournament (for men and women) at the 2012 Summer Olympics.

The CBVC will take place between 1 June 2010 and 24 June 2012, with a direct elimination competition format where the winning NOC/NF(s) moves on to the next phase. The competition will consist of three phases: Sub zone, Zone and Continental Final. The five winning NOCs/NFs (one per Continental Confederation territory (Asia/Oceania, North America, South America, Europe and Africa)) per gender will qualify.

At the CBVC Final, NOCs/NFs which have already obtained two quota places will compete in a bracket separate from those NOCs/NFs still seeking a quota place(s).

== Africa (CAVB) ==
Teams will compete in the sub-zonal tournaments, with all teams advancing, with each team carrying over the points it earns to the five zonal tournament, where teams not entered in the sub-zonal tournaments can enter. The top team in each group plus top three runners up will advance to the continental cup.

== Asia/Oceania (AVC) ==
41 Asian and Oceanian nations including 2 non IOC members (Macau and the Northern Marina Islands) registered to take part. The top two from each subzone group will qualify for the Zonal tournaments, with the top three from each zonal tournament advancing to the continental championship.

== Europe (CEV) ==
Teams will be split into groups of four, where an elimination bracket will determine the 3 teams to advance to the next stage from the sub-zones.

== North America (NORCECA) ==
The North American zone see the sub zones divided into the Caribbean, Central and Central American zones. The two Caribbean zones will meet and the central and Central American zones will meet in the zonal tournaments. Both Caribbean zones will have an elimination bracket where two teams per country competing in a two-game series, if there is a tie a fifth game will be played by both countries. In the second round of the bracket the series will be a best of three. The winner and runner up of the main bracket and of the repechage will advance to the next round.
