= Volleyball at the 2012 Summer Olympics – Men's tournament =

Men's volleyball at the Games of the XXX Olympiad
- Venue: Earls Court Exhibition Centre
- Date: 29 July – 12 August
- Competitors: 144 from 12 nations

Medalists
1st place, gold medalist(s)		Russia (1st title)
2nd place, silver medalist(s)		Brazil
3rd place, bronze medalist(s)		Italy

The men's tournament in volleyball at the 2012 Summer Olympics was the 13th edition of the event at the Summer Olympics, organised by the world's governing body, the FIVB, in conjunction with the IOC. It was held in London, United Kingdom from 29 July to 12 August 2012.

Russia won the gold medal in a 3–2 victory against Brazil.

== Qualification ==
Means of qualification	Date	Host	Vacancies	Qualified
Host Country	—N/a	—N/a	1	Great Britain
2011 World Cup	20 November – 4 December 2011	Japan	3	Russia
2011 World Cup	20 November – 4 December 2011	Japan	3	Poland
2011 World Cup	20 November – 4 December 2011	Japan	3	Brazil
African Qualifier	17–21 January 2012	(Cameroon) Yaoundé	1	Tunisia
North American Qualifier	7–12 May 2012	(United States) Long Beach	1	United States
European Qualifier	8–13 May 2012	(Bulgaria) Sofia	1	Italy
South American Qualifier	11–13 May 2012	(Argentina) Burzaco	1	Argentina
1st World Qualifier	1–10 June 2012	(Japan) Tokyo	1	Serbia
Asian Qualifier*	1–10 June 2012	(Japan) Tokyo	1	Australia
2nd World Qualifier	8–10 June 2012	(Bulgaria) Sofia	1	Bulgaria
3rd World Qualifier	8–10 June 2012	(Germany) Berlin	1	Germany
Total			12	

* The Asian Qualifier was combined with the 1st World Qualifier. The first place team of the tournament qualified as the 1st World Qualifier winners, while the best Asian team except the 1st World Qualifier winners qualified as the Asian Qualifier winners.

== Pools composition ==
Teams were seeded following the serpentine system according to their FIVB World Ranking as of 4 January 2012. FIVB reserved the right to seed the hosts as head of pool A regardless of the World Ranking. Rankings are shown in brackets except the hosts who ranked 92nd.

Pool A	Pool B
Great Britain (Hosts)	Brazil (1)
Italy (3)	Russia (2)
Poland (4)	United States (6)
Argentina (8)	Serbia (7)
Bulgaria (9)	Germany (13)
Australia (22)	Tunisia (18)

== Venue ==
All matches
London, United Kingdom
Earls Court Exhibition Centre
Capacity: 20,000
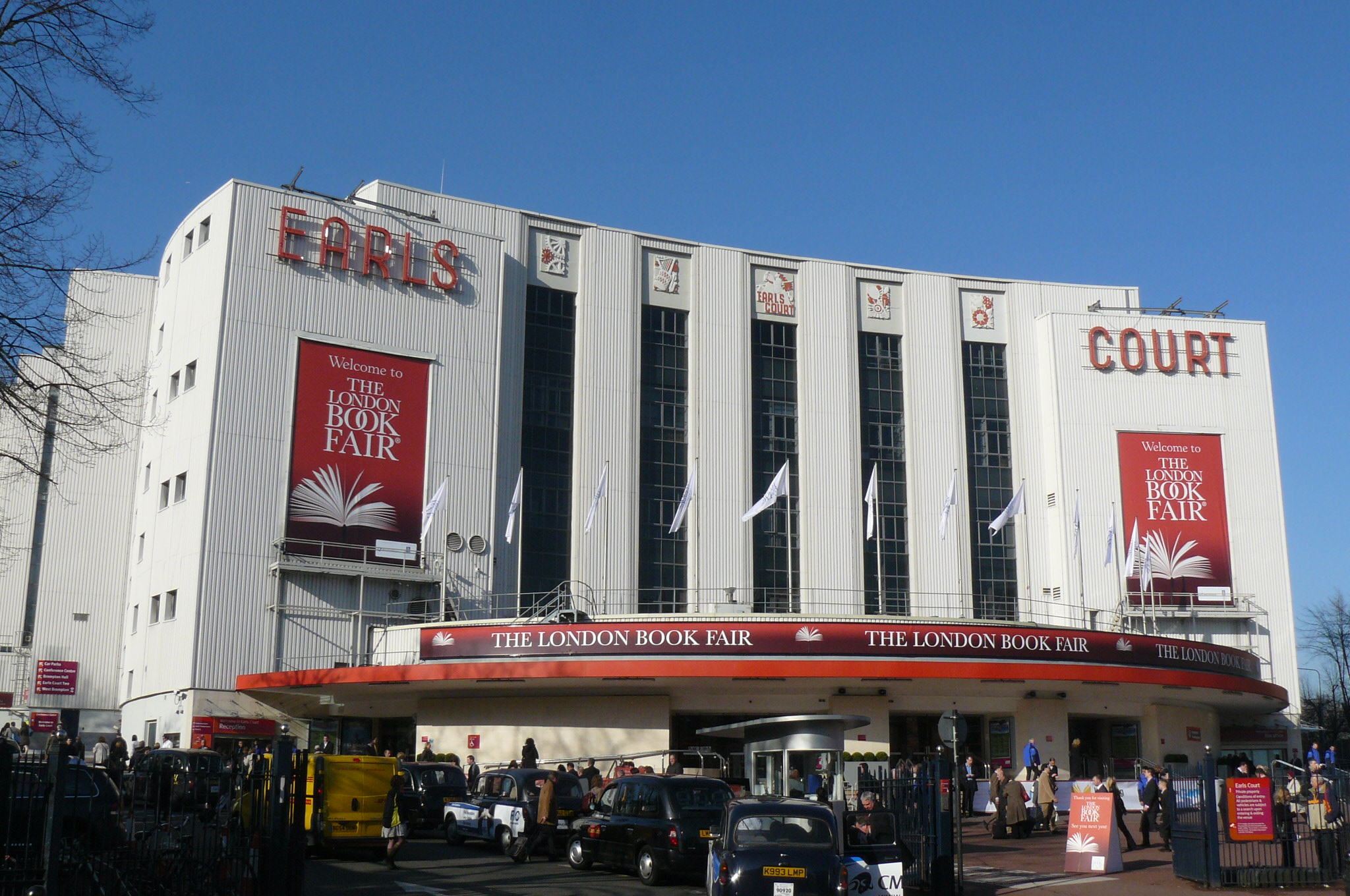

== Pool standing procedure ==
1. Match points
2. Number of matches won
3. Sets ratio
4. Points ratio
5. Result of the last match between the tied teams

Match won 3–0 or 3–1: 3 match points for the winner, 0 match points for the loser
Match won 3–2: 2 match points for the winner, 1 match point for the loser

== Preliminary round ==
- All times are British Summer Time (UTC+01:00).
- The top four teams in each pool qualified for the quarterfinals.

Qualified for the Quarterfinals

=== Pool A ===
Pos	Team	Pld	W	L	Pts	SW	SL	SR	SPW	SPL	SPR
1	Bulgaria	5	4	1	12	13	4	3.250	407	390	1.044
2	Poland	5	3	2	9	11	7	1.571	433	374	1.158
3	Argentina	5	3	2	9	10	7	1.429	382	367	1.041
4	Italy	5	3	2	8	10	9	1.111	426	413	1.031
5	Australia	5	2	3	7	8	10	0.800	395	397	0.995
6	Great Britain	5	0	5	0	0	15	0.000	274	376	0.729

29 July 2012; 09:30	Great Britain	0–3	Bulgaria	Earls Court Exhibition Centre, London; Attendance: 14,000; Referees: Wang Ning (CHN), Akihiko Tano (JPN)
29 July 2012; 09:30	(18–25, 20–25, 24–26); Results Statistics			Earls Court Exhibition Centre, London; Attendance: 14,000; Referees: Wang Ning (CHN), Akihiko Tano (JPN)

29 July 2012; 14:45	Australia	0–3	Argentina	Earls Court Exhibition Centre, London; Attendance: 11,500; Referees: Nasr Shaaban (EGY), Susana Rodriguez (ESP)
29 July 2012; 14:45	(21–25, 22–25, 20–25); Results Statistics			Earls Court Exhibition Centre, London; Attendance: 11,500; Referees: Nasr Shaaban (EGY), Susana Rodriguez (ESP)

29 July 2012; 20:00	Italy	1–3	Poland	Earls Court Exhibition Centre, London; Attendance: 15,000; Referees: Rolando Cholakian (ARG), Zorica Bjelić (SRB)
29 July 2012; 20:00	(25–21, 20–25, 23–25, 14–25); Results Statistics			Earls Court Exhibition Centre, London; Attendance: 15,000; Referees: Rolando Cholakian (ARG), Zorica Bjelić (SRB)

31 July 2012; 11:40	Poland	1–3	Bulgaria	Earls Court Exhibition Centre, London; Attendance: 11,300; Referees: Andrey Zenovich (RUS), Akihiko Tano (JPN)
31 July 2012; 11:40	(22–25, 27–29, 25–13, 23–25); Results Statistics			Earls Court Exhibition Centre, London; Attendance: 11,300; Referees: Andrey Zenovich (RUS), Akihiko Tano (JPN)

31 July 2012; 14:45	Italy	3–1	Argentina	Earls Court Exhibition Centre, London; Attendance: 12,500; Referees: Ibrahim Al-Naama (QAT), Frans Loderus (NED)
31 July 2012; 14:45	(25–17, 21–25, 25–17, 25–23); Results Statistics			Earls Court Exhibition Centre, London; Attendance: 12,500; Referees: Ibrahim Al-Naama (QAT), Frans Loderus (NED)

31 July 2012; 20:00	Great Britain	0–3	Australia	Earls Court Exhibition Centre, London; Attendance: 14,000; Referees: Georgios Karampetsos (GRE), Rogerio Espicalsky (BRA)
31 July 2012; 20:00	(15–25, 18–25, 20–25); Results Statistics			Earls Court Exhibition Centre, London; Attendance: 14,000; Referees: Georgios Karampetsos (GRE), Rogerio Espicalsky (BRA)

2 August 2012; 12:20	Australia	0–3	Bulgaria	Earls Court Exhibition Centre, London; Attendance: 12,000; Referees: Wang Ning (CHN), Andrey Zenovich (RUS)
2 August 2012; 12:20	(23–25, 21–25, 22–25); Results Statistics			Earls Court Exhibition Centre, London; Attendance: 12,000; Referees: Wang Ning (CHN), Andrey Zenovich (RUS)

2 August 2012; 16:45	Poland	3–0	Argentina	Earls Court Exhibition Centre, London; Attendance: 13,000; Referees: Georgios Karampetsos (GRE), Ibrahim Al-Naama (QAT)
2 August 2012; 16:45	(25–18, 25–20, 25–16); Results Statistics			Earls Court Exhibition Centre, London; Attendance: 13,000; Referees: Georgios Karampetsos (GRE), Ibrahim Al-Naama (QAT)

2 August 2012; 22:30	Great Britain	0–3	Italy	Earls Court Exhibition Centre, London; Attendance: 11,500; Referees: Rogerio Espicalsky (BRA), Nasr Shaaban (EGY)
2 August 2012; 22:30	(19–25, 16–25, 20–25); Results Statistics			Earls Court Exhibition Centre, London; Attendance: 11,500; Referees: Rogerio Espicalsky (BRA), Nasr Shaaban (EGY)

4 August 2012; 11:30	Great Britain	0–3	Poland	Earls Court Exhibition Centre, London; Attendance: 14,900; Referees: Ibrahim Al-Naama (QAT), Georgios Karampetsos (GRE)
4 August 2012; 11:30	(16–25, 19–25, 18–25); Results Statistics			Earls Court Exhibition Centre, London; Attendance: 14,900; Referees: Ibrahim Al-Naama (QAT), Georgios Karampetsos (GRE)

4 August 2012; 14:45	Australia	2–3	Italy	Earls Court Exhibition Centre, London; Attendance: 11,500; Referees: Andrey Zenovich (RUS), Rogerio Espicalsky (BRA)
4 August 2012; 14:45	(25–21, 25–18, 21–25, 14–25, 13–15); Results Statistics			Earls Court Exhibition Centre, London; Attendance: 11,500; Referees: Andrey Zenovich (RUS), Rogerio Espicalsky (BRA)

4 August 2012; 20:30	Argentina	3–1	Bulgaria	Earls Court Exhibition Centre, London; Attendance: 14,500; Referees: Frans Loderus (NED), Akihiko Tano (JPN)
4 August 2012; 20:30	(25–18, 21–25, 25–19, 25–20); Results Statistics			Earls Court Exhibition Centre, London; Attendance: 14,500; Referees: Frans Loderus (NED), Akihiko Tano (JPN)

6 August 2012; 09:30	Australia	3–1	Poland	Earls Court Exhibition Centre, London; Attendance: 12,000; Referees: Rogerio Espicalsky (BRA), Andrey Zenovich (RUS)
6 August 2012; 09:30	(25–21, 25–22, 18–25, 25–22); Results Statistics			Earls Court Exhibition Centre, London; Attendance: 12,000; Referees: Rogerio Espicalsky (BRA), Andrey Zenovich (RUS)

6 August 2012; 14:45	Italy	0–3	Bulgaria	Earls Court Exhibition Centre, London; Attendance: 14,000; Referees: Akihiko Tano (JPN), Bela Hobor (HUN)
6 August 2012; 14:45	(30–32, 20–25, 19–25); Results Statistics			Earls Court Exhibition Centre, London; Attendance: 14,000; Referees: Akihiko Tano (JPN), Bela Hobor (HUN)

6 August 2012; 16:45	Great Britain	0–3	Argentina	Earls Court Exhibition Centre, London; Attendance: 13,750; Referees: Denny Cespedes (DOM), Zorica Bjelić (SRB)
6 August 2012; 16:45	(18–25, 18–25, 15–25); Results Statistics			Earls Court Exhibition Centre, London; Attendance: 13,750; Referees: Denny Cespedes (DOM), Zorica Bjelić (SRB)

=== Pool B ===
Pos	Team	Pld	W	L	Pts	SW	SL	SR	SPW	SPL	SPR
1	United States	5	4	1	13	14	4	3.500	427	370	1.154
2	Brazil	5	4	1	11	13	5	2.600	418	379	1.103
3	Russia	5	4	1	11	12	5	2.400	408	352	1.159
4	Germany	5	2	3	5	6	11	0.545	379	388	0.977
5	Serbia	5	1	4	5	7	13	0.538	413	455	0.908
6	Tunisia	5	0	5	0	1	15	0.067	294	395	0.744

29 July 2012; 11:30	Russia	3–0	Germany	Earls Court Exhibition Centre, London; Attendance: 12,500; Referees: Simone Santi (ITA), Frans Loderus (NED)
29 July 2012; 11:30	(31–29, 25–18, 25–17); Results Statistics			Earls Court Exhibition Centre, London; Attendance: 12,500; Referees: Simone Santi (ITA), Frans Loderus (NED)

29 July 2012; 16:45	United States	3–0	Serbia	Earls Court Exhibition Centre, London; Attendance: 12,000; Referees: Bela Hobor (HUN), Denny Cespedes (DOM)
29 July 2012; 16:45	(25–17, 25–22, 25–21); Results Statistics			Earls Court Exhibition Centre, London; Attendance: 12,000; Referees: Bela Hobor (HUN), Denny Cespedes (DOM)

29 July 2012; 22:20	Brazil	3–0	Tunisia	Earls Court Exhibition Centre, London; Attendance: 10,000; Referees: Ibrahim Al-Naama (QAT), Brian McDougall (GBR)
29 July 2012; 22:20	(25–17, 25–21, 25–18); Results Statistics			Earls Court Exhibition Centre, London; Attendance: 10,000; Referees: Ibrahim Al-Naama (QAT), Brian McDougall (GBR)

31 July 2012; 09:30	Serbia	3–1	Tunisia	Earls Court Exhibition Centre, London; Attendance: 10,500; Referees: Denny Cespedes (DOM), Jose Velez (PUR)
31 July 2012; 09:30	(25–15, 25–21, 20–25, 25–18); Results Statistics			Earls Court Exhibition Centre, London; Attendance: 10,500; Referees: Denny Cespedes (DOM), Jose Velez (PUR)

31 July 2012; 17:03	United States	3–0	Germany	Earls Court Exhibition Centre, London; Attendance: 13,000; Referees: Nasr Shaaban (EGY), Rolando Cholakian (ARG)
31 July 2012; 17:03	(25–23, 25–16, 25–20); Results Statistics			Earls Court Exhibition Centre, London; Attendance: 13,000; Referees: Nasr Shaaban (EGY), Rolando Cholakian (ARG)

31 July 2012; 22:00	Brazil	3–0	Russia	Earls Court Exhibition Centre, London; Attendance: 14,800; Referees: Bela Hobor (HUN), Wang Ning (CHN)
31 July 2012; 22:00	(25–21, 25–23, 25–21); Results Statistics			Earls Court Exhibition Centre, London; Attendance: 14,800; Referees: Bela Hobor (HUN), Wang Ning (CHN)

2 August 2012; 09:30	Serbia	2–3	Germany	Earls Court Exhibition Centre, London; Attendance: 14,000; Referees: Bela Hobor (HUN), Rolando Cholakian (ARG)
2 August 2012; 09:30	(25–22, 29–27, 18–25, 20–25, 18–20); Results Statistics			Earls Court Exhibition Centre, London; Attendance: 14,000; Referees: Bela Hobor (HUN), Rolando Cholakian (ARG)

2 August 2012; 14:45	Russia	3–0	Tunisia	Earls Court Exhibition Centre, London; Attendance: 13,000; Referees: Akihiko Tano (JPN), Mitchell Davidson (CAN)
2 August 2012; 14:45	(25–21, 25–15, 25–23); Results Statistics			Earls Court Exhibition Centre, London; Attendance: 13,000; Referees: Akihiko Tano (JPN), Mitchell Davidson (CAN)

2 August 2012; 20:00	Brazil	1–3	United States	Earls Court Exhibition Centre, London; Attendance: 11,500; Referees: Frans Loderus (NED), Jose Velez (PUR)
2 August 2012; 20:00	(25–23, 25–27, 19–25, 17–25); Results Statistics			Earls Court Exhibition Centre, London; Attendance: 11,500; Referees: Frans Loderus (NED), Jose Velez (PUR)

4 August 2012; 09:30	Germany	3–0	Tunisia	Earls Court Exhibition Centre, London; Attendance: 11,000; Referees: Brian McDougall (GBR), Denny Cespedes (DOM)
4 August 2012; 09:30	(25–15, 25–16, 25–16); Results Statistics			Earls Court Exhibition Centre, London; Attendance: 11,000; Referees: Brian McDougall (GBR), Denny Cespedes (DOM)

4 August 2012; 17:10	Russia	3–2	United States	Earls Court Exhibition Centre, London; Attendance: 13,650; Referees: Bela Hobor (HUN), Rolando Cholakian (ARG)
4 August 2012; 17:10	(27–29, 19–25, 26–24, 25–16, 15–8); Results Statistics			Earls Court Exhibition Centre, London; Attendance: 13,650; Referees: Bela Hobor (HUN), Rolando Cholakian (ARG)

4 August 2012; 22:45	Brazil	3–2	Serbia	Earls Court Exhibition Centre, London; Attendance: 11,000; Referees: Wang Ning (CHN), Simone Santi (ITA)
4 August 2012; 22:45	(22–25, 25–15, 20–25, 25–22, 15–9); Results Statistics			Earls Court Exhibition Centre, London; Attendance: 11,000; Referees: Wang Ning (CHN), Simone Santi (ITA)

6 August 2012; 11:55	Russia	3–0	Serbia	Earls Court Exhibition Centre, London; Attendance: 12,000; Referees: Rolando Cholakian (ARG), Susana Rodriguez (ESP)
6 August 2012; 11:55	(25–15, 25–20, 25–17); Results Statistics			Earls Court Exhibition Centre, London; Attendance: 12,000; Referees: Rolando Cholakian (ARG), Susana Rodriguez (ESP)

6 August 2012; 20:00	United States	3–0	Tunisia	Earls Court Exhibition Centre, London; Attendance: 11,000; Referees: Georgios Karampetsos (GRE), Mitchell Davidson (CAN)
6 August 2012; 20:00	(25–15, 25–19, 25–19); Results Statistics			Earls Court Exhibition Centre, London; Attendance: 11,000; Referees: Georgios Karampetsos (GRE), Mitchell Davidson (CAN)

6 August 2012; 22:00	Brazil	3–0	Germany	Earls Court Exhibition Centre, London; Attendance: 12,000; Referees: Simone Santi (ITA), Karin Zahorcova (CZE)
6 August 2012; 22:00	(25–21, 25–22, 25–19); Results Statistics			Earls Court Exhibition Centre, London; Attendance: 12,000; Referees: Simone Santi (ITA), Karin Zahorcova (CZE)

== Final round ==
- All times are British Summer Time (UTC+01:00).
- The first ranked teams of both pools played against the fourth ranked teams of the other pool. The second ranked teams faced the second or third ranked teams of the other pool, determined by drawing of lots. The drawing of lots was held after the last match in the preliminary round.

Quarterfinals
8 August
Bulgaria	3
Germany	0
8 August
Poland	0
Russia	3
8 August
Argentina	0
Brazil	3
8 August
United States	0
Italy	3

Semifinals
10 August
Bulgaria	1
Russia	3
10 August
Brazil	3
Italy	0

Gold medal match
12 August
Russia	3
Brazil	2
Bronze medal match
12 August
Bulgaria	1
Italy	3

=== Quarterfinals ===
8 August 2012; 14:00	Argentina	0–3	Brazil	Earls Court Exhibition Centre, London; Attendance: 11,500; Referees: Andrey Zenovich (RUS), Simone Santi (ITA)
8 August 2012; 14:00	(19–25, 17–25, 20–25); Results Statistics			Earls Court Exhibition Centre, London; Attendance: 11,500; Referees: Andrey Zenovich (RUS), Simone Santi (ITA)

8 August 2012; 16:00	United States	0–3	Italy	Earls Court Exhibition Centre, London; Attendance: 14,000; Referees: Wang Ning (CHN), Georgios Karampetsos (GRE)
8 August 2012; 16:00	(26–28, 20–25, 20–25); Results Statistics			Earls Court Exhibition Centre, London; Attendance: 14,000; Referees: Wang Ning (CHN), Georgios Karampetsos (GRE)

8 August 2012; 19:30	Poland	0–3	Russia	Earls Court Exhibition Centre, London; Attendance: 14,000; Referees: Frans Loderus (NED), Nasr Shaaban (EGY)
8 August 2012; 19:30	(17–25, 23–25, 21–25); Results Statistics			Earls Court Exhibition Centre, London; Attendance: 14,000; Referees: Frans Loderus (NED), Nasr Shaaban (EGY)

8 August 2012; 21:30	Bulgaria	3–0	Germany	Earls Court Exhibition Centre, London; Attendance: 12,000; Referees: Bela Hobor (HUN), Denny Cespedes (DOM)
8 August 2012; 21:30	(25–20, 25–16, 25–14); Results Statistics			Earls Court Exhibition Centre, London; Attendance: 12,000; Referees: Bela Hobor (HUN), Denny Cespedes (DOM)

=== Semifinals ===
10 August 2012; 15:00	Bulgaria	1–3	Russia	Earls Court Exhibition Centre, London; Attendance: 13,500; Referees: Wang Ning (CHN), Denny Cespedes (DOM)
10 August 2012; 15:00	(21–25, 15–25, 25–23, 23–25); Results Statistics			Earls Court Exhibition Centre, London; Attendance: 13,500; Referees: Wang Ning (CHN), Denny Cespedes (DOM)

10 August 2012; 19:30	Brazil	3–0	Italy	Earls Court Exhibition Centre, London; Attendance: 14,000; Referees: Akihiko Tano (JPN), Ibrahim Al-Naama (QAT)
10 August 2012; 19:30	(25–21, 25–12, 25–21); Results Statistics			Earls Court Exhibition Centre, London; Attendance: 14,000; Referees: Akihiko Tano (JPN), Ibrahim Al-Naama (QAT)

=== Bronze medal match ===
12 August 2012; 09:30	Bulgaria	1–3	Italy	Earls Court Exhibition Centre, London; Attendance: 12,000; Referees: Frans Loderus (NED), Rolando Cholakian (ARG)
12 August 2012; 09:30	(19–25, 25–23, 22–25, 21–25); Results Statistics			Earls Court Exhibition Centre, London; Attendance: 12,000; Referees: Frans Loderus (NED), Rolando Cholakian (ARG)

=== Gold medal match ===
12 August 2012; 13:00	Russia	3–2	Brazil	Earls Court Exhibition Centre, London; Attendance: 14,500; Referees: Bela Hobor (HUN), Akihiko Tano (JPN)
12 August 2012; 13:00	(19–25, 20–25, 29–27, 25–22, 15–9); Results Statistics			Earls Court Exhibition Centre, London; Attendance: 14,500; Referees: Bela Hobor (HUN), Akihiko Tano (JPN)

== Final standing ==
Rank	Team
1st place, gold medalist(s)	Russia
2nd place, silver medalist(s)	Brazil
3rd place, bronze medalist(s)	Italy
4	Bulgaria
5	Argentina
5	Germany
5	Poland
5	United States
9	Australia
9	Serbia
11	Great Britain
11	Tunisia

2012 Men's Olympic champions

Russia
1st title

12–man roster
Apalikov, Khtey (c), Grankin, Tetyukhin, Sokolov, Berezhko, Butko, Muserskiy, Ilinikh, Mikhaylov, Volkov, Obmochaev (L)
Head coach
Alekno

== Medalists ==
Gold	Silver	Bronze
Russia Nikolay Apalikov; Taras Khtey (c); Sergey Grankin; Sergey Tetyukhin; Aleksandr Sokolov; Yury Berezhko; Aleksandr Butko; Dmitriy Muserskiy; Dmitriy Ilinikh; Maksim Mikhaylov; Aleksandr Volkov; Aleksey Obmochaev (L) Head coach: Vladimir Alekno	Brazil Bruno Rezende; Wallace de Souza; Sidnei Santos; Leandro Vissotto Neves; Gilberto Godoy Filho (c); Murilo Endres; Sérgio Santos; Thiago Alves; Rodrigo Santana; Lucas Saatkamp; Ricardo Garcia; Dante Amaral Head coach: Bernardinho	Italy Luigi Mastrangelo; Simone Parodi; Samuele Papi; Michal Lasko; Ivan Zaytsev; Dante Boninfante; Cristian Savani (c); Dragan Travica; Alessandro Fei; Emanuele Birarelli; Andrea Bari (L); Andrea Giovi (L) Head coach: Mauro Berruto

== Awards ==
- Most valuable player
  (Brazil) Murilo Endres
- Best scorer
  (Russia) Maksim Mikhaylov
- Best spiker
  (Russia) Maksim Mikhaylov
- Best blocker
  (Germany) Max Gunthor
- Best server
  (Italy) Cristian Savani
- Best digger
  (Bulgaria) Teodor Salparov
- Best setter
  (Bulgaria) Georgi Bratoev
- Best receiver
  (Poland) Krzysztof Ignaczak
- Best libero
  (Germany) Markus Steuerwald

== See also ==
- Volleyball at the 2012 Summer Olympics – Women's tournament
