= Nikolay Apalikov =

Russian volleyball player (born 1982)

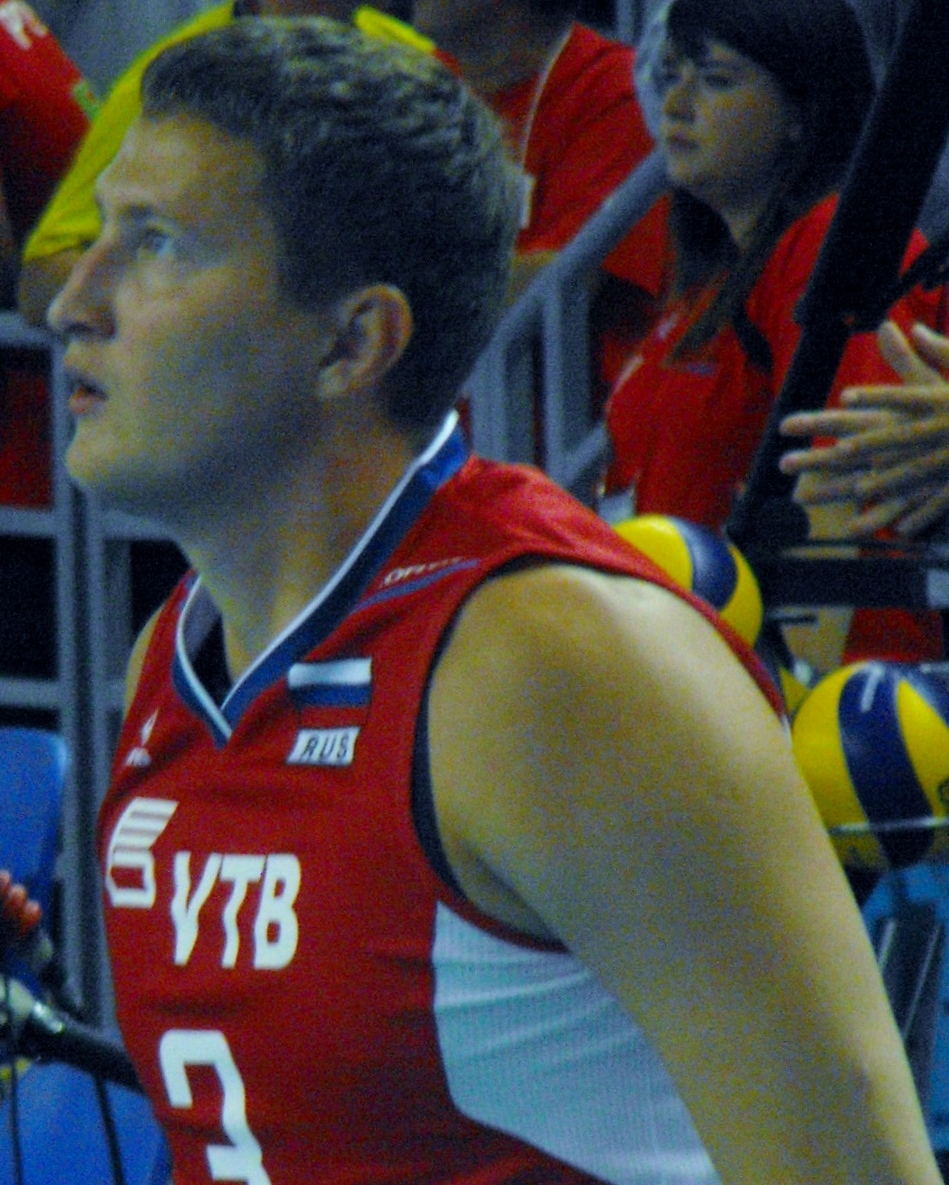

Personal information
- Full name: Nikolay Sergeevich Apalikov
- Nationality: Russian
- Born: 26 August 1982 (age 44); Orsk, Russia, USSR
- Height: 2.03 m (6 ft 8 in)
- Weight: 105 kg (231 lb)
- Spike: 353 cm (139 in)
- Block: 344 cm (135 in)

Volleyball information
- Position: Middle blocker

Career
| Years | Teams |
|---|---|
| 2000–2007; 2007–2015; 2015–2016; 2016–2018; 2018–2019 | Lokomotiv Yekaterinburg; Zenit Kazan; Gazprom-Ugra Surgut; Kuzbass Kemerovo; Lokomotiv Novosibirsk |

National team
| 2005–2014 | Russia |
Honours
Representing Russia
Men's volleyball
Olympic Games
| Gold medal – first place | 2012 London | Team |
World Grand Champions Cup
| Silver medal – second place | 2013 Japan |
World Cup
| Gold medal – first place | 2011 Japan |
World League
| Gold medal – first place | 2011 Gdansk |
| Gold medal – first place | 2013 Mar del Plata |
European Championship
| Gold medal – first place | 2013 Denmark/Poland |
| Silver medal – second place | 2005 Serbia and Montenegro/Italy |
- Last updated: 28 December 2017

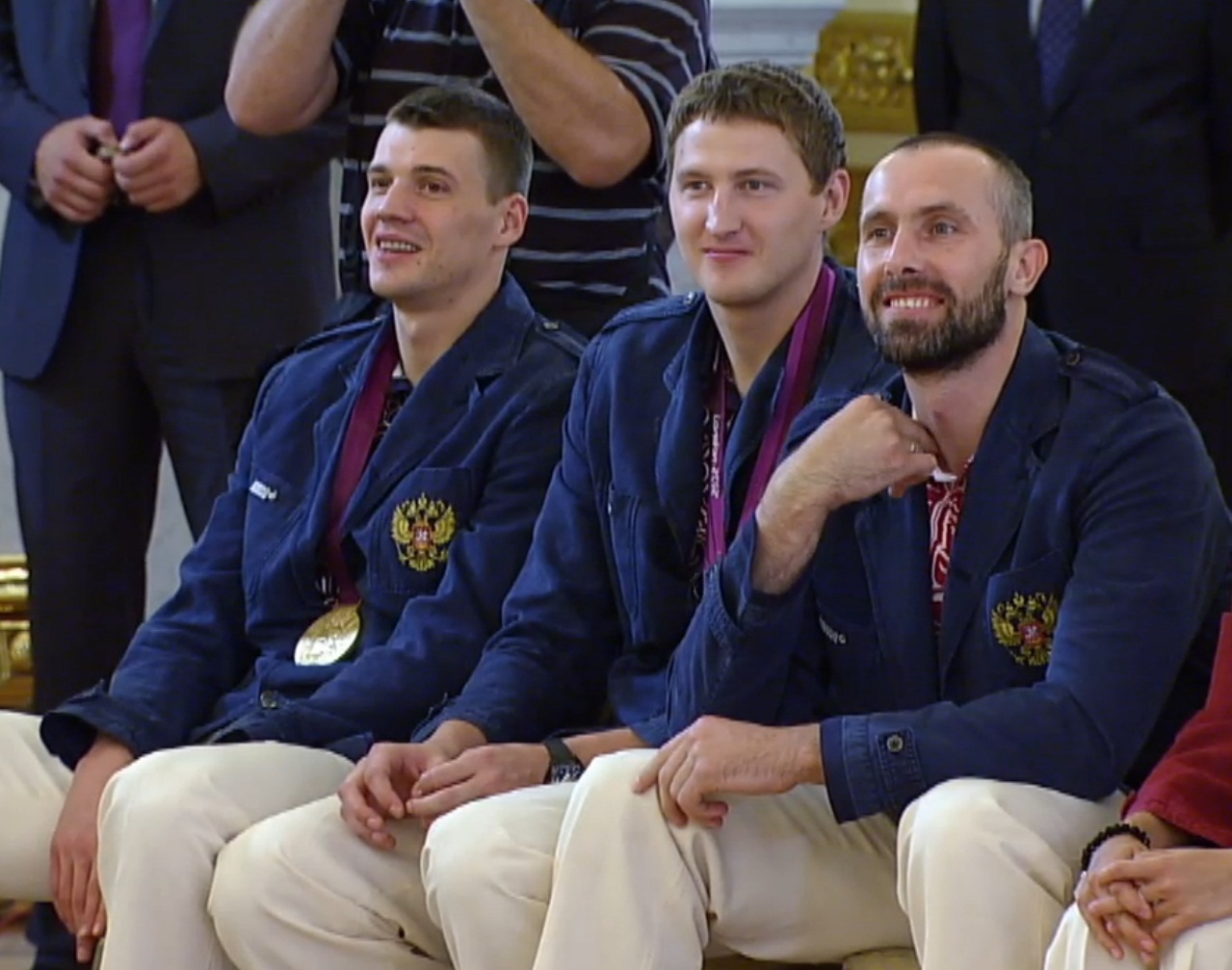
Apalikov (center) at the meeting of Russian medalists of the 2012 Summer Olympics with the President of Russia on 16 August 2012.

Nikolay Sergeevich Apalikov (Russian: Апаликов, Николай Сергеевич; born on 26 August 1982) is a Russian volleyball player. He was born in Orsk, Orenburg Oblast, USSR. He was a member of the Russian team that clinched the gold medal at the 2012 Summer Olympics.

== Career ==
started his professional career in Lokomotiv-Izumrud, the team based in Ekaterinburg. Nikolay won the 2011–12 CEV Champions League playing with Zenit Kazan. He also won the Best Blocker award in that competition.

== Awards ==
=== Individuals ===
- 2011–12 CEV Champions League "Best Blocker"

=== Clubs ===
- 2008/09, 2009/10, 2010/11 Russian Men's Volleyball Championship
- 2000/01, 2007/08, 2009/10 Russian Men's Volleyball Cup
- 2007–08 CEV Champions League - Champion, Dynamo-Tattransgaz
- 2010–11 CEV Champions League - Runner-up, with Zenit Kazan
- 2011–12 CEV Champions League - Champion, with Zenit Kazan
- 2014–15 CEV Champions League - Champion, with Zenit Kazan

=== National team ===
- 2005 European Volleyball Championship
- 2011 World League
- 2011 World Cup

Awards
| Preceded by (Russia) Alexander Abrosimov | Best Blocker of CEV Champions League; 2011/2012 | Succeeded by (United States) David Lee |
