= Andrea Giovi =

Italian volleyball player (born 1983)

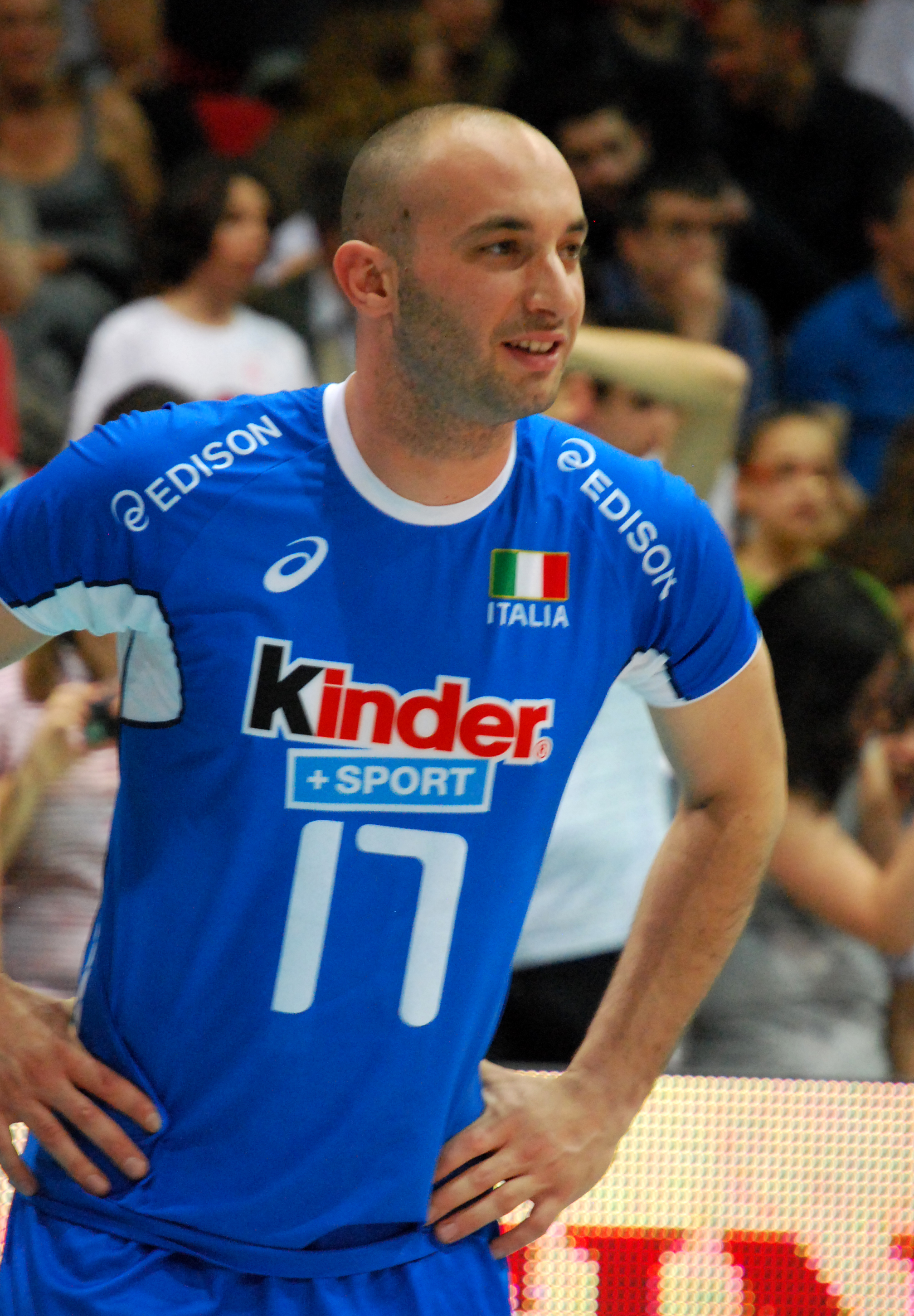
- Giovi in 2017

Personal information
- Nationality: Italian
- Born: 19 August 1983 (age 43); Perugia, Italy
- Height: 1.85 m (6 ft 1 in)
- Weight: 80 kg (176 lb)
- Spike: 310 cm (122 in)
- Block: 290 cm (114 in)

Volleyball information
- Position: Libero
- Current team: (Italy) Sir Safety Perugia
- Number: 17

National team
2009-	Italy
Medal record
Men's volleyball
Representing Italy
Olympic Games
Bronze medal – third place	2012 London	Team
European Championship
Silver medal – second place	2011 Austria/Czech Republuic	Team
Silver medal – second place	2013 Denmark/Poland	Team
World League
Bronze medal – third place	2013 Mar del Plata	Team
Bronze medal – third place	2014 Florence	Team
Mediterranean Games
Gold medal – first place	2009 Pescara	Team
- Last updated: 6 October 2014

Andrea Giovi (born 19 August 1983) is an Italian volleyball player, a member of Italy men's national volleyball team and Italian club Sir Safety Perugia, a bronze medalist of the Olympic Games London 2012, World League (2013, 2014) and silver medalist of the European Championship (2011, 2013).
