= Simone Santi =

Italian volleyball referee (born 1966)

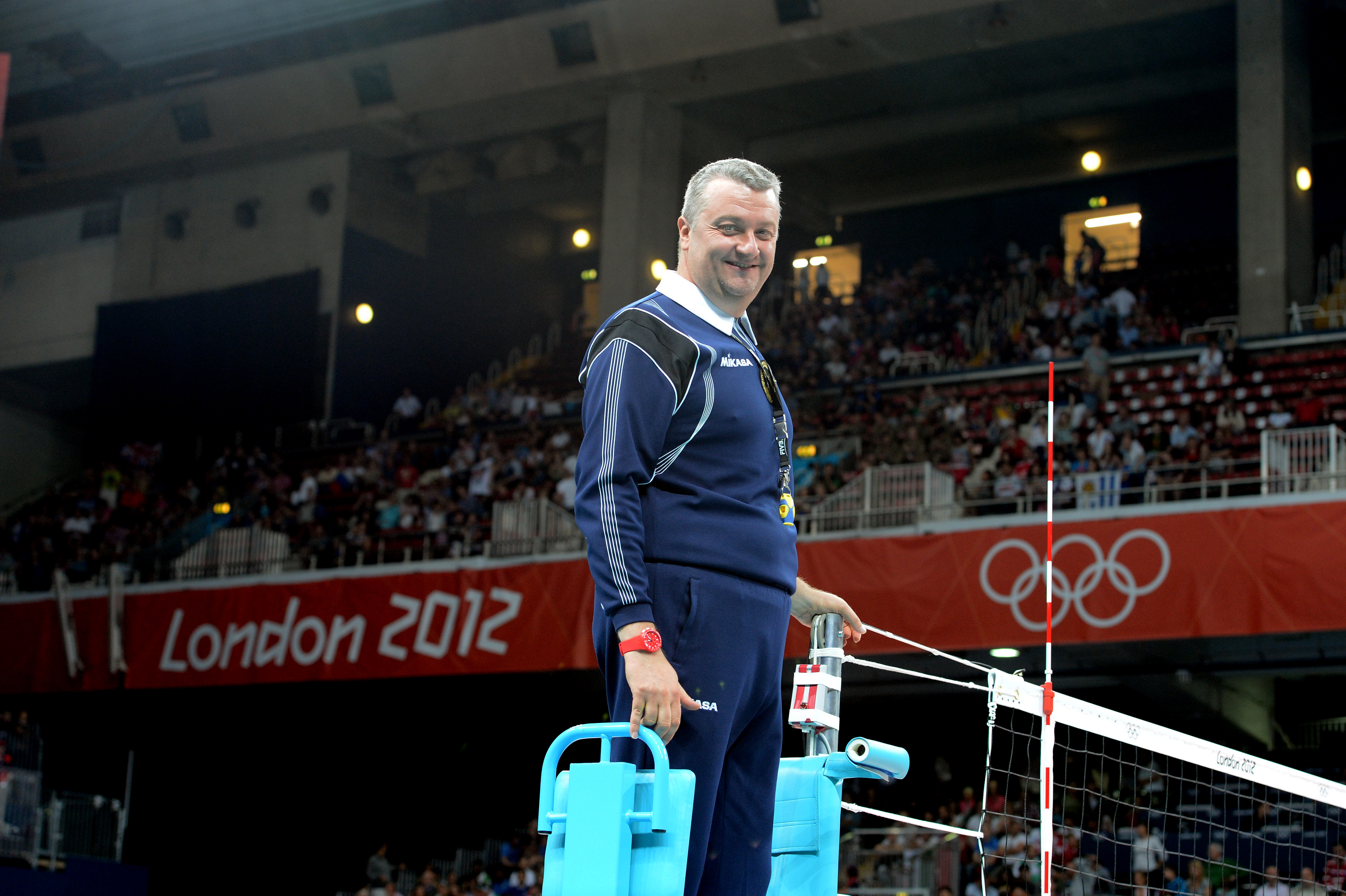
- Santi at London Olympic Games in 2012
- Born: 24 May 1966 (age 60); Città di Castello, Italy
- Occupation: Referee
- Years active: 1980–present

Simone Santi (born 24 May 1966) is an Italian volleyball referee. He refereed matches in Europe, Turkey, Russia, Japan, South Korea, Brazil and Argentina. In 2012, he refereed at the Summer Olympics in London.
