= 2011 FIVB Volleyball Men's Club World Championship =

2011 Men's Club World Championship
Tournament details
- Host country: Qatar
- Dates: 8–14 October
- Teams: 8 (from 5 confederations)
- Venue: 1 (in 1 host city)

Final positions
- Champions: (Italy) Trentino Diatec (3rd title)

Tournament awards
- MVP: (Italy) Osmany Juantorena (TRE)

The 2011 FIVB Volleyball Men's Club World Championship was the 7th edition of the event. It was held in Doha, Qatar from 8 to 14 October 2011.

== Qualification ==
Team (Confederation)	Qualified as
(Qatar) Al-Arabi (AVC)	Hosts
(Egypt) Al-Ahly (CAVB)	2011 African Champions
(Iran) Paykan Tehran (AVC)	2011 Asian Champions
(Italy) Trentino Diatec (CEV)	2011 European Champions
(Canada) Trinity Western Spartans (NORCECA)	2011 NORCECA Representatives
(Brazil) SESI São Paulo (CSV)	2011 South American Champions
(Russia) Zenit Kazan (CEV)	Wild Card (2011 European Runners-up)
(Poland) Jastrzębski Węgiel (CEV)	Wild Card (2011 European 4th place)

== Pools composition ==
Pool A	Pool B
(Poland) Jastrzębski Węgiel	(Italy) Trentino Diatec
(Canada) Trinity Western Spartans	(Egypt) Al-Ahly
(Russia) Zenit Kazan	(Brazil) SESI São Paulo
(Iran) Paykan Tehran	(Qatar) Al-Arabi

== Venue ==
All matches
Doha, Qatar
Aspire Ladies Sports Hall
Capacity: 2,500

== Pool standing procedure ==
1. Match points
2. Number of matches won
3. Sets ratio
4. Points ratio
5. Result of the last match between the tied teams

Match won 3–0 or 3–1: 3 match points for the winner, 0 match points for the loser
Match won 3–2: 2 match points for the winner, 1 match point for the loser

== Preliminary round ==
- All times are Arabia Standard Time (UTC+03:00).

=== Pool A ===
Pos	Team	Pld	W	L	Pts	SW	SL	SR	SPW	SPL	SPR	Qualification
1	(Poland) Jastrzębski Węgiel	3	3	0	8	9	2	4.500	251	207	1.213	Semifinals
2	(Russia) Zenit Kazan	3	2	1	7	8	3	2.667	257	208	1.236	Semifinals
3	(Canada) Trinity Western Spartans	3	1	2	2	3	8	0.375	197	247	0.798	
4	(Iran) Paykan Tehran	3	0	3	1	2	9	0.222	208	251	0.829	

Date	Time		Score		Set 1	Set 2	Set 3	Set 4	Set 5	Total	Report
08 Oct	10:00	Trinity Western Spartans (Canada)	0–3	(Russia) Zenit Kazan	11–25	15–25	16–25			42–75	P2 P3
08 Oct	17:00	Jastrzębski Węgiel (Poland)	3–0	(Iran) Paykan Tehran	25–18	25–14	25–14			75–46	P2 P3
09 Oct	17:00	Paykan Tehran (Iran)	0–3	(Russia) Zenit Kazan	24–26	18–25	23–25			65–76	P2 P3
10 Oct	15:00	Trinity Western Spartans (Canada)	3–2	(Iran) Paykan Tehran	25–23	18–25	17–25	25–18	15–6	100–97	P2 P3
10 Oct	17:20	Jastrzębski Węgiel (Poland)	3–2	(Russia) Zenit Kazan	25–22	25–17	11–25	21–25	19–17	101–106	P2 P3
11 Oct	17:10	Jastrzębski Węgiel (Poland)	3–0	(Canada) Trinity Western Spartans	25–17	25–20	25–18			75–55	P2 P3

=== Pool B ===
Pos	Team	Pld	W	L	Pts	SW	SL	SR	SPW	SPL	SPR	Qualification
1	(Italy) Trentino Diatec	3	3	0	9	9	1	9.000	243	206	1.180	Semifinals
2	(Brazil) SESI São Paulo	3	2	1	6	7	4	1.750	262	237	1.105	Semifinals
3	(Qatar) Al-Arabi	3	1	2	2	3	8	0.375	232	265	0.875	
4	(Egypt) Al-Ahly	3	0	3	1	3	9	0.333	257	286	0.899	

Date	Time		Score		Set 1	Set 2	Set 3	Set 4	Set 5	Total	Report
08 Oct	19:00	Al-Ahly (Egypt)	2–3	(Qatar) Al-Arabi	23–25	31–29	24–26	25–21	12–15	115–116	P2 P3
09 Oct	15:00	Trentino Diatec (Italy)	3–0	(Egypt) Al-Ahly	25–16	25–22	25–22			75–60	P2 P3
09 Oct	19:00	SESI São Paulo (Brazil)	3–0	(Qatar) Al-Arabi	25–20	25–20	25–22			75–62	P2 P3
10 Oct	19:50	Al-Ahly (Egypt)	1–3	(Brazil) SESI São Paulo	18–25	25–27	25–18	14–25		82–95	P2 P3
11 Oct	19:00	Trentino Diatec (Italy)	3–0	(Qatar) Al-Arabi	25–22	25–15	25–17			75–54	P2 P3
12 Oct	19:10	SESI São Paulo (Brazil)	1–3	(Italy) Trentino Diatec	25–18	23–25	23–25	21–25		92–93	P2 P3

== Final round ==
- All times are Arabia Standard Time (UTC+03:00).

Semifinals
13 October
(Poland) Jastrzębski	3
(Brazil) SESI	2
13 October
(Italy) Trentino	3
(Russia) Kazan	1

Final
14 October
(Poland) Jastrzębski	1
(Italy) Trentino	3
3rd place match
14 October
(Brazil) SESI	1
(Russia) Kazan	3

=== Semifinals ===
Date	Time		Score		Set 1	Set 2	Set 3	Set 4	Set 5	Total	Report
13 Oct	15:00	Jastrzębski Węgiel (Poland)	3–2	(Brazil) SESI São Paulo	25–23	18–25	19–25	25–13	15–13	102–99	P2 P3
13 Oct	19:20	Trentino Diatec (Italy)	3–1	(Russia) Zenit Kazan	25–22	25–21	19–25	25–14		94–82	P2 P3

=== 3rd place match ===
Date	Time		Score		Set 1	Set 2	Set 3	Set 4	Set 5	Total	Report
14 Oct	15:00	SESI São Paulo (Brazil)	1–3	(Russia) Zenit Kazan	25–19	20–25	23–25	23–25		91–94	P2 P3

=== Final ===
Date	Time		Score		Set 1	Set 2	Set 3	Set 4	Set 5	Total	Report
14 Oct	19:20	Jastrzębski Węgiel (Poland)	1–3	(Italy) Trentino Diatec	31–29	16–25	11–25	16–25		74–104	P2 P3

== Final standing ==
Rank	Team
1st place, gold medalist(s)	(Italy) Trentino Diatec
2nd place, silver medalist(s)	(Poland) Jastrzębski Węgiel
3rd place, bronze medalist(s)	(Russia) Zenit Kazan
4	(Brazil) SESI São Paulo
5	(Egypt) Al-Ahly
5	(Qatar) Al-Arabi
5	(Iran) Paykan Tehran
5	(Canada) Trinity Western Spartans

2011 Men's Club World Champions

3rd title

14–man Roster
Matey Kaziyski (c), Emanuele Birarelli, Dore Della Lunga, Osmany Juantorena, Łukasz Żygadło, Raphael Oliveira, Steve Brinkman, Filippo Lanza, Tsvetan Sokolov, Mitar Tzourits, Massimo Colaci, Jan Štokr, Andrea Bari, Matteo Burgsthaler
Head coach
Radostin Stoychev

== Awards ==
- Most valuable player
  (Italy) Osmany Juantorena (Trentino Diatec)
- Best scorer
  (Russia) Maxim Mikhaylov (Zenit Kazan)
- Best spiker
  (Italy) Osmany Juantorena (Trentino Diatec)
- Best blocker
  (United States) Russell Holmes (Jastrzębski Węgiel)
- Best server
  (Bulgaria) Matey Kaziyski (Trentino Diatec)
- Best setter
  (Brazil) Raphael Oliveira (Trentino Diatec)
- Best receiver
  (Brazil) Sérgio Santos (SESI São Paulo)
- Best libero
  (Brazil) Sérgio Santos (SESI São Paulo)
