= Aleksandr Sokolov (volleyball) =

Russian volleyball player (born 1982)

Personal information
- Nationality: Russian
- Born: 1 March 1982 (age 44); Kolomna, Russia, USSR
- Height: 1.93 m (6 ft 4 in)
- Weight: 97 kg (214 lb)
- Spike: 315 cm (124 in)
- Block: 310 cm (122 in)

Volleyball information
- Position: Libero
- Current club: Yaroslavich Yaroslavl
- Number: 7

Career
Years	Teams
2000–2009; 2009–2013; 2013–2014; 2014–2015; 2015–	Yaroslavich Yaroslavl; Fakel Novy Urengoy; Yaroslavich Yaroslavl; Dinamo Krasnodar; Yaroslavich Yaroslavl

National team
2006–	Russia
Honours
Representing Russia
Men's volleyball
Olympic Games
Gold medal – first place	2012 London	Team
World Cup
Gold medal – first place	2011 Japan
World League
Gold medal – first place	2011 Gdańsk
Nations League
Gold medal – first place	2018 Lille
- Last updated: 21 December 2017

Aleksandr Sergeyevich Sokolov (Russian: Александр Сергеевич Соколов; born 1 March 1982) is a Russian volleyball player, who competes for Fakel and the national team. He has competed at the 2012 Summer Olympics, where Russia won the gold medal in the final against Brazil.
