= Volleyball at the 2012 Summer Olympics – Men's European qualification =

The European qualification for the 2012 Men's Olympic Volleyball Tournament was held from 13 August 2011 to 13 May 2012.

== Pool standing procedure ==
1. Match points
2. Number of matches won
3. Sets ratio
4. Points ratio
5. Result of the last match between the tied teams

Match won 3–0 or 3–1: 3 match points for the winner, 0 match points for the loser
Match won 3–2: 2 match points for the winner, 1 match point for the loser

== Pre–elimination round ==
- Dates: 13–14 August 2011
- All times are local.
- In case of a 1–1 tie, teams play a Golden Set to determine the winner.

Team 1	Agg.	Team 2	1st leg	2nd leg
Denmark	2–0	Georgia	3–0	3–0

=== First leg ===
Date	Time		Score		Set 1	Set 2	Set 3	Set 4	Set 5	Total	Report
13 Aug	19:30	Denmark	3–0	Georgia	25–13	25–14	25–11			75–38	Report

=== Second leg ===
Date	Time		Score		Set 1	Set 2	Set 3	Set 4	Set 5	Total	Report
14 Aug	19:30	Denmark	3–0	Georgia	25–15	25–8	25–16			75–39	Report

== Elimination round ==
- Dates: 26 August – 4 September 2011
- All times are local.
- In case of a 1–1 tie, teams play a Golden Set to determine the winner.

Team 1	Agg.	Team 2	1st leg	2nd leg
Denmark	0–2	Spain	1–3	0–3
Greece	2–0	Bosnia and Herzegovina	3–1	3–0
Romania	0–2	Netherlands	1–3	1–3
Israel	0–2	Ukraine	0–3	1–3
Hungary	0–2	Latvia	2–3	1–3
Montenegro	2–0	Macedonia	3–1	3–2

=== First leg ===
Date	Time		Score		Set 1	Set 2	Set 3	Set 4	Set 5	Total	Report
26 Aug	18:00	Hungary	2–3	Latvia	25–23	26–24	21–25	18–25	10–15	100–112	Report
26 Aug	20:30	Montenegro	3–1	Macedonia	31–29	27–25	28–30	25–22		111–106	Report
27 Aug	18:00	Romania	1–3	Netherlands	23–25	29–31	25–18	22–25		99–99	Report
27 Aug	18:30	Denmark	1–3	Spain	15–25	25–22	24–26	25–27		89–100	Report
28 Aug	19:30	Israel	0–3	Ukraine	24–26	20–25	21–25			65–76	Report
3 Sep	19:30	Greece	3–1	Bosnia and Herzegovina	25–20	25–27	25–21	25–16		100–84	Report

=== Second leg ===
Date	Time		Score		Set 1	Set 2	Set 3	Set 4	Set 5	Total	Report
2 Sep	21:00	Macedonia	2–3	Montenegro	22–25	25–23	22–25	25–21	4–15	98–109	Report
3 Sep	17:00	Ukraine	3–1	Israel	25–22	26–24	21–25	25–23		97–94	Report
3 Sep	19:00	Latvia	3–1	Hungary	25–23	25–14	21–25	25–18		96–80	Report
3 Sep	19:00	Spain	3–0	Denmark	25–17	25–22	25–21			75–60	Report
3 Sep	19:30	Netherlands	3–1	Romania	25–20	23–25	25–18	25–18		98–81	Report
4 Sep	19:30	Greece	3–0	Bosnia and Herzegovina	25–18	25–18	25–12			75–48	Report

== Pre–qualification tournaments ==
- The Qualification Tournament hosts Bulgaria and the four 2011 World Cup participants directly qualified for the Qualification Tournament.

=== Tournament 1 ===
- Venue: Poprad Arena, Poprad, Slovakia
- Dates: 22–26 November 2011
- All times are Central European Time (UTC+01:00).

==== Preliminary round ====
===== Pool A =====
Pos	Team	Pld	W	L	Pts	SW	SL	SR	SPW	SPL	SPR	Qualification
1	Slovakia	2	2	0	6	6	1	6.000	176	137	1.285	Semifinals
2	Spain	2	1	1	3	4	4	1.000	180	182	0.989	Semifinals
3	Austria	2	0	2	0	1	6	0.167	135	172	0.785	

Date	Time		Score		Set 1	Set 2	Set 3	Set 4	Set 5	Total	Report
22 Nov	18:00	Slovakia	3–0	Austria	25–21	25–14	25–19			75–54	Report
23 Nov	18:00	Spain	1–3	Slovakia	28–26	18–25	23–25	14–25		83–101	Report
24 Nov	18:00	Austria	1–3	Spain	25–22	19–25	19–25	18–25		81–97	Report

===== Pool B =====
Pos	Team	Pld	W	L	Pts	SW	SL	SR	SPW	SPL	SPR	Qualification
1	Estonia	2	1	1	4	5	3	1.667	181	156	1.160	Semifinals
2	Turkey	2	1	1	3	3	3	1.000	131	132	0.992	Semifinals
3	Montenegro	2	1	1	2	3	5	0.600	157	181	0.867	

Date	Time		Score		Set 1	Set 2	Set 3	Set 4	Set 5	Total	Report
22 Nov	20:30	Montenegro	0–3	Turkey	19–25	20–25	18–25			57–75	Report
23 Nov	20:30	Estonia	2–3	Montenegro	23–25	25–21	22–25	25–14	11–15	106–100	Report
24 Nov	20:30	Turkey	0–3	Estonia	19–25	15–25	22–25			56–75	Report

==== Final round ====
Semifinals
25 November
Slovakia	3
Turkey	2
25 November
Estonia	1
Spain	3

Final
26 November
Slovakia	2
Spain	3

===== Semifinals =====
Date	Time		Score		Set 1	Set 2	Set 3	Set 4	Set 5	Total	Report
25 Nov	18:00	Slovakia	3–2	Turkey	25–22	23–25	17–25	25–17	15–12	105–101	Report
25 Nov	20:30	Estonia	1–3	Spain	25–23	18–25	22–25	25–27		90–100	Report

===== Final =====
Date	Time		Score		Set 1	Set 2	Set 3	Set 4	Set 5	Total	Report
26 Nov	18:00	Slovakia	2–3	Spain	20–25	25–21	23–25	25–21	15–17	108–109	Report

==== Final standing ====
Rank	Team
1	Spain
2	Slovakia
3	Estonia
3	Turkey
5	Austria
5	Montenegro

Qualified for the Qualification tournament

=== Tournament 2 ===
- Venue: Complexe Sportif Léo Lagrange, Tourcoing, France
- Dates: 23–27 November 2011
- All times are Central European Time (UTC+01:00).

==== Preliminary round ====
===== Pool A =====
Pos	Team	Pld	W	L	Pts	SW	SL	SR	SPW	SPL	SPR	Qualification
1	France	2	2	0	5	6	2	3.000	163	157	1.038	Semifinals
2	Germany	2	1	1	4	5	4	1.250	197	160	1.231	Semifinals
3	Greece	2	0	2	0	1	6	0.167	129	172	0.750	

Date	Time		Score		Set 1	Set 2	Set 3	Set 4	Set 5	Total	Report
23 Nov	18:30	France	3–0	Greece	25–23	25–22	25–12			75–57	Report
24 Nov	19:00	Germany	2–3	France	25–12	19–25	21–25	25–11	10–15	100–88	Report
25 Nov	15:00	Greece	1–3	Germany	25–22	16–25	16–25	15–25		72–97	Report

===== Pool B =====
Pos	Team	Pld	W	L	Pts	SW	SL	SR	SPW	SPL	SPR	Qualification
1	Czech Republic	2	2	0	5	6	3	2.000	210	198	1.061	Semifinals
2	Belgium	2	1	1	3	4	3	1.333	165	157	1.051	Semifinals
3	Latvia	2	0	2	1	2	6	0.333	166	186	0.892	

Date	Time		Score		Set 1	Set 2	Set 3	Set 4	Set 5	Total	Report
23 Nov	15:00	Czech Republic	3–2	Latvia	21–25	26–24	25–20	23–25	16–14	111–108	Report
24 Nov	15:00	Latvia	0–3	Belgium	20–25	19–25	19–25			58–75	Report
25 Nov	20:00	Belgium	1–3	Czech Republic	24–26	23–25	25–23	18–25		90–99	Report

==== Final round ====
Semifinals
26 November
France	2
Belgium	3
26 November
Czech Republic	1
Germany	3

Final
27 November
Belgium	0
Germany	3

===== Semifinals =====
Date	Time		Score		Set 1	Set 2	Set 3	Set 4	Set 5	Total	Report
26 Nov	15:00	France	2–3	Belgium	19–25	25–22	24–26	25–23	12–15	105–111	Report
26 Nov	18:30	Czech Republic	1–3	Germany	25–19	25–27	23–25	16–25		89–96	Report

===== Final =====
Date	Time		Score		Set 1	Set 2	Set 3	Set 4	Set 5	Total	Report
27 Nov	16:00	Belgium	0–3	Germany	17–25	23–25	23–25			63–75	Report

==== Final standing ====
Rank	Team
1	Germany
2	Belgium
3	Czech Republic
3	France
5	Greece
5	Latvia

Qualified for the Qualification tournament

=== Tournament 3 ===
- Venue: Gradski vrt Hall, Osijek, Croatia
- Dates: 22–26 November 2011
- All times are Central European Time (UTC+01:00).

==== Preliminary round ====
===== Pool A =====
Pos	Team	Pld	W	L	Pts	SW	SL	SR	SPW	SPL	SPR	Qualification
1	Finland	2	2	0	6	6	1	6.000	170	150	1.133	Semifinals
2	Croatia	2	1	1	2	3	5	0.600	175	192	0.911	Semifinals
3	Netherlands	2	0	2	1	3	6	0.500	203	206	0.985	

Date	Time		Score		Set 1	Set 2	Set 3	Set 4	Set 5	Total	Report
22 Nov	17:20	Finland	3–1	Netherlands	25–23	19–25	25–19	25–20		94–87	Report
23 Nov	20:20	Croatia	0–3	Finland	24–26	23–25	16–25			63–76	Report
24 Nov	20:20	Netherlands	2–3	Croatia	25–18	25–19	21–25	33–35	12–15	116–112	Report

===== Pool B =====
Pos	Team	Pld	W	L	Pts	SW	SL	SR	SPW	SPL	SPR	Qualification
1	Slovenia	2	2	0	5	6	3	2.000	212	201	1.055	Semifinals
2	Portugal	2	1	1	4	5	3	1.667	188	177	1.062	Semifinals
3	Ukraine	2	0	2	0	1	6	0.167	150	172	0.872	

Date	Time		Score		Set 1	Set 2	Set 3	Set 4	Set 5	Total	Report
22 Nov	20:20	Portugal	3–0	Ukraine	25–21	25–18	25–23			75–62	Report
23 Nov	17:20	Slovenia	3–2	Portugal	26–28	19–25	25–19	25–23	20–18	115–113	Report
24 Nov	17:20	Ukraine	1–3	Slovenia	25–21	24–26	21–25	18–25		88–97	Report

==== Final round ====
Semifinals
25 November
Slovenia	3
Croatia	2
25 November
Finland	3
Portugal	0

Final
26 November
Slovenia	1
Finland	3

===== Semifinals =====
Date	Time		Score		Set 1	Set 2	Set 3	Set 4	Set 5	Total	Report
25 Nov	17:20	Slovenia	3–2	Croatia	22–25	25–19	22–25	25–11	15–8	109–88	Report
25 Nov	20:20	Finland	3–0	Portugal	25–21	25–21	25–20			75–62	Report

===== Final =====
Date	Time		Score		Set 1	Set 2	Set 3	Set 4	Set 5	Total	Report
26 Nov	15:30	Slovenia	1–3	Finland	25–15	23–25	22–25	20–25		90–90	Report

==== Final standing ====
Rank	Team
1	Finland
2	Slovenia
3	Croatia
3	Portugal
5	Netherlands
5	Ukraine

Qualified for the Qualification tournament

=== Second ranked teams ===
- Russia and Poland qualified for the 2012 Summer Olympics via the 2011 World Cup and are replaced by the top two second ranked teams.

Pos	Team	Pld	W	L	Pts	SW	SL	SR	SPW	SPL	SPR	Qualification
1	Slovakia	4	3	1	9	11	6	1.833	389	347	1.121	Qualification tournament
2	Slovenia	4	3	1	7	10	8	1.250	411	379	1.084	Qualification tournament
3	Belgium	4	2	2	5	7	8	0.875	339	337	1.006	

== Qualification tournament ==
- Venue: Armeets Arena, Sofia, Bulgaria
- Dates: 8–13 May 2012
- All times are Eastern European Summer Time (UTC+03:00).

=== Preliminary round ===
==== Pool A ====
Pos	Team	Pld	W	L	Pts	SW	SL	SR	SPW	SPL	SPR	Qualification
1	Bulgaria	3	3	0	9	9	0	MAX	225	176	1.278	Semifinals
2	Serbia	3	2	1	6	6	5	1.200	258	241	1.071	Semifinals
3	Spain	3	1	2	3	4	6	0.667	210	231	0.909	
4	Slovenia	3	0	3	0	1	9	0.111	204	249	0.819	

Date	Time		Score		Set 1	Set 2	Set 3	Set 4	Set 5	Total	Report
8 May	20:45	Bulgaria	3–0	Slovenia	25–23	25–18	25–22			75–63	Report
9 May	17:00	Slovenia	0–3	Spain	17–25	23–25	18–25			58–75	Report
9 May	19:30	Serbia	0–3	Bulgaria	22–25	16–25	23–25			61–75	Report
10 May	17:30	Spain	1–3	Serbia	19–25	17–25	25–23	22–25		83–98	Report
11 May	14:30	Slovenia	1–3	Serbia	25–22	18–25	25–27	15–25		83–99	Report
11 May	20:45	Spain	0–3	Bulgaria	16–25	20–25	16–25			52–75	Report

==== Pool B ====
Pos	Team	Pld	W	L	Pts	SW	SL	SR	SPW	SPL	SPR	Qualification
1	Italy	3	3	0	8	9	2	4.500	253	236	1.072	Semifinals
2	Germany	3	2	1	6	6	4	1.500	242	225	1.076	Semifinals
3	Slovakia	3	1	2	3	3	7	0.429	215	230	0.935	
4	Finland	3	0	3	1	4	9	0.444	282	301	0.937	

Date	Time		Score		Set 1	Set 2	Set 3	Set 4	Set 5	Total	Report
8 May	14:30	Germany	3–0	Slovakia	25–19	25–22	25–20			75–61	Report
8 May	17:30	Finland	2–3	Italy	21–25	25–16	28–30	25–16	14–16	113–103	Report
9 May	14:00	Finland	1–3	Germany	29–31	19–25	25–21	16–25		89–102	Report
10 May	14:30	Slovakia	3–1	Finland	25–20	25–16	21–25	25–19		96–80	Report
10 May	20:45	Italy	3–0	Germany	25–22	25–21	25–22			75–65	Report
11 May	17:30	Slovakia	0–3	Italy	23–25	13–25	22–25			58–75	Report

=== Final round ===
Semifinals
12 May
Bulgaria	1
Germany	3
12 May
Italy	3
Serbia	1

Final
13 May
Germany	2
Italy	3

==== Semifinals ====
Date	Time		Score		Set 1	Set 2	Set 3	Set 4	Set 5	Total	Report
12 May	17:30	Italy	3–1	Serbia	25–14	25–19	19–25	25–16		94–74	Report
12 May	20:45	Bulgaria	1–3	Germany	22–25	25–20	22–25	16–25		85–95	Report

==== Final ====
Date	Time		Score		Set 1	Set 2	Set 3	Set 4	Set 5	Total	Report
13 May	20:45	Germany	2–3	Italy	22–25	24–26	25–19	25–22	12–15	108–107	Report

=== Final standing ===
Rank	Team
1	Italy
2	Germany
3	Bulgaria
3	Serbia
5	Slovakia
5	Spain
7	Finland
7	Slovenia

Qualified for the 2012 Summer Olympics
