= Aleksey Obmochaev =

Russian volleyball player (born 1989)

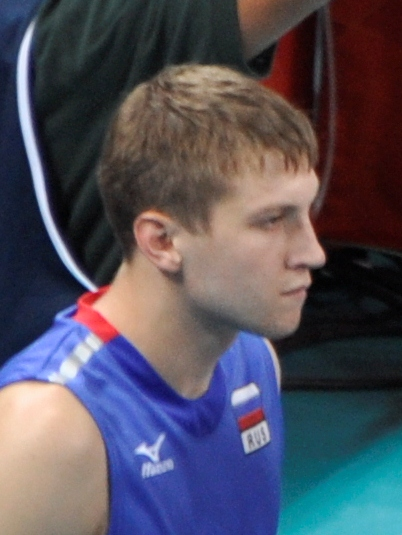
- Obmochaev in 2012

Personal information
- Full name: Aleksey Aleksandrovich Obmochaev
- Nationality: Russian
- Born: 22 May 1989 (age 37); Kislovodsk, Russia, USSR
- Height: 1.89 m (6 ft 2 in)
- Weight: 84 kg (185 lb)
- Spike: 325 cm (128 in)
- Block: 310 cm (122 in)

Volleyball information
- Position: Libero
- Current club: Kuzbass Kemerovo
- Number: 1

Career
Years	Teams
2007–2009; 2011–2013; 2015–2016; 2017–2019; 2020–	Zenit Kazan; Zenit Kazan; Dinamo Moscow; Belogorie Belgorod; Kuzbass Kemerovo

National team
2011–2016	Russia
Honours
Men's volleyball
Representing Russia
Olympic Games
Gold medal – first place	2012 London	Team
World Cup
Gold medal – first place	2011 Japan
World League
Gold medal – first place	2011 Gdańsk
- Last updated: 21 January 2021

Aleksey Aleksandrovich Obmochaev (Russian: Алексей Александрович Обмочаев; born 22 May 1989) is a Russian volleyball player, a member of Russia men's national volleyball team and Russian club Kuzbass Kemerovo. He was a champion at the 2011 World Cup, and a gold medalist at the 2012 Olympics.

== Personal life ==
In 2012–2016 he was married to Russian volleyball player Natalia Goncharova.

== Career ==
In 2012 he made his Olympic debut and became Olympic Champion with Russian national team. In 2013 he violated the Russian league regulations and was suspended for two years from the Superliga.
