= Volleyball at the 2012 Summer Olympics – Men's North American qualification =

The North American Qualification Tournament for the 2012 Men's Olympic Volleyball Tournament was held in Long Beach, United States, from 7 to 12 May 2012.

== Venue ==
- Walter Pyramid, Long Beach, United States

== Pool standing procedure ==
1. Number of matches won
2. Match points
3. Points ratio
4. Sets ratio
5. Result of the last match between the tied teams

Match won 3–0: 5 match points for the winner, 0 match points for the loser
Match won 3–1: 4 match points for the winner, 1 match point for the loser
Match won 3–2: 3 match points for the winner, 2 match points for the loser

== Preliminary round ==
- All times are Pacific Daylight Time (UTC−07:00).

=== Pool A ===
Pos	Team	Pld	W	L	Pts	SPW	SPL	SPR	SW	SL	SR	Qualification
1	United States	3	3	0	15	225	121	1.860	9	0	MAX	Semifinals
2	Mexico	3	2	1	9	225	216	1.042	6	4	1.500	Quarterfinals
3	Trinidad and Tobago	3	1	2	6	194	229	0.847	4	6	0.667	Quarterfinals
4	Costa Rica	3	0	3	0	147	225	0.653	0	9	0.000	5th–8th semifinals

Date	Time		Score		Set 1	Set 2	Set 3	Set 4	Set 5	Total	Report
7 May	15:02	Mexico	3–0	Costa Rica	25–17	25–18	25–20			75–55	P2 P3
7 May	20:00	United States	3–0	Trinidad and Tobago	25–9	25–10	25–14			75–33	P2 P3
8 May	15:00	Mexico	3–1	Trinidad and Tobago	25–18	19–25	25–21	25–22		94–86	P2 P3
8 May	20:00	United States	3–0	Costa Rica	25–14	25–9	25–9			75–32	P2 P3
9 May	15:00	Costa Rica	0–3	Trinidad and Tobago	18–25	23–25	19–25			60–75	P2 P3
9 May	20:00	United States	3–0	Mexico	25–23	25–19	25–14			75–56	P2 P3

=== Pool B ===
Pos	Team	Pld	W	L	Pts	SPW	SPL	SPR	SW	SL	SR	Qualification
1	Canada	3	3	0	15	225	160	1.406	9	0	MAX	Semifinals
2	Cuba	3	2	1	10	209	182	1.148	6	3	2.000	Quarterfinals
3	Puerto Rico	3	1	2	5	183	199	0.920	3	6	0.500	Quarterfinals
4	Dominican Republic	3	0	3	0	149	225	0.662	0	9	0.000	5th–8th semifinals

Date	Time		Score		Set 1	Set 2	Set 3	Set 4	Set 5	Total	Report
7 May	13:00	Canada	3–0	Dominican Republic	25–21	25–13	25–15			75–49	P2 P3
7 May	18:00	Cuba	3–0	Puerto Rico	25–20	25–18	25–18			75–56	P2 P3
8 May	13:00	Cuba	3–0	Dominican Republic	25–15	25–21	25–15			75–51	P2 P3
8 May	18:00	Canada	3–0	Puerto Rico	25–19	25–20	25–13			75–52	P2 P3
9 May	13:00	Puerto Rico	3–0	Dominican Republic	25–15	25–18	25–16			75–49	P2 P3
9 May	18:00	Cuba	0–3	Canada	21–25	17–25	21–25			59–75	P2 P3

== Final round ==
- All times are Pacific Daylight Time (UTC−07:00).

Quarterfinals
10 May
Mexico	1
Puerto Rico	3
10 May
Cuba	3
Trinidad and Tobago	0

Semifinals
11 May
Canada	3
Puerto Rico	2
11 May
United States	3
Cuba	1

Final
12 May
Canada	0
United States	3
3rd place match
12 May
Puerto Rico	0
Cuba	3

5th–8th semifinals
11 May
Costa Rica	0
Mexico	3
11 May
Dominican Republic	3
Trinidad and Tobago	1

5th place match
12 May
Mexico	3
Dominican Republic	0
7th place match
12 May
Costa Rica	1
Trinidad and Tobago	3

=== Quarterfinals ===
Date	Time		Score		Set 1	Set 2	Set 3	Set 4	Set 5	Total	Report
10 May	18:00	Cuba	3–0	Trinidad and Tobago	25–18	25–13	25–16			75–47	P2 P3
10 May	20:00	Mexico	1–3	Puerto Rico	21–25	23–25	25–20	19–25		88–95	P2 P3

=== 5th–8th semifinals ===
Date	Time		Score		Set 1	Set 2	Set 3	Set 4	Set 5	Total	Report
11 May	13:00	Costa Rica	0–3	Mexico	19–25	19–25	16–25			54–75	P2 P3
11 May	15:00	Dominican Republic	3–1	Trinidad and Tobago	25–21	22–25	27–25	25–19		99–90	P2 P3

=== Semifinals ===
Date	Time		Score		Set 1	Set 2	Set 3	Set 4	Set 5	Total	Report
11 May	18:00	Canada	3–2	Puerto Rico	22–25	25–23	19–25	25–23	15–11	106–107	P2 P3
11 May	21:07	United States	3–1	Cuba	21–25	25–18	25–17	25–16		96–76	P2 P3

=== 7th place match ===
Date	Time		Score		Set 1	Set 2	Set 3	Set 4	Set 5	Total	Report
12 May	13:00	Costa Rica	1–3	Trinidad and Tobago	18–25	23–25	25–15	22–25		88–90	P2 P3

=== 5th place match ===
Date	Time		Score		Set 1	Set 2	Set 3	Set 4	Set 5	Total	Report
12 May	15:21	Mexico	3–0	Dominican Republic	25–21	25–16	25–21			75–58	P2 P3

=== 3rd place match ===
Date	Time		Score		Set 1	Set 2	Set 3	Set 4	Set 5	Total	Report
12 May	17:20	Puerto Rico	0–3	Cuba	20–25	21–25	15–25			56–75	P2 P3

=== Final ===
Date	Time		Score		Set 1	Set 2	Set 3	Set 4	Set 5	Total	Report
12 May	20:00	Canada	0–3	United States	26–28	18–25	20–25			64–78	P2 P3

== Final standing ==
Rank	Team
1	United States
2	Canada
3	Cuba
4	Puerto Rico
5	Mexico
6	Dominican Republic
7	Trinidad and Tobago
8	Costa Rica

Qualified for the 2012 Summer Olympics
