= 2011 FIVB Volleyball Men's World Cup =

Volleyball competition held in Japan

2011 Men's World Cup
Tournament details
- Host country: Japan
- Dates: 20 November – 4 December
- Teams: 12 (from 5 confederations)
- Venue: 8 (in 7 host cities)

Final positions
- Champions: Russia (2nd title)
- Runners-up: Poland
- Third place: Brazil
- Fourth place: Italy

Tournament awards
- MVP: (Russia) Maxim Mikhaylov

The 2011 FIVB Men's World Cup was held from 20 November to 4 December 2011 in Japan. The tournament was the first step in the qualification process for the 2012 Summer Olympics in London, England, United Kingdom. The top three teams qualified for the Olympics, and joined Great Britain as they had already secured a berth as the host country.

== Qualification ==
12 teams participated in the World Cup:

- The host country's team.
- The five champions of their respective continental championships in 2011.
- Four highest-ranked second-place teams of their respective continental championships in 2011 (according to the FIVB World Ranking as of January 15, 2011).
  - NB: If Japan win or finish as one of the best runners-up in the AVC Continental Championship the third ranked team from the tournament will compete.
- Two wild cards chosen from among the participants of the continental championships in 2011.

Competition	Date	Venue	Qualified
Host country	—	―	Japan
2011 NORCECA Championship	29 Aug – 3 Sep 2011	Mayagüez, Puerto Rico	Cuba; United States
2011 European Championship	10–18 September 2011	Austria; Czech Republic	Serbia; Italy
2011 South American Championship	19–25 September 2011	Cuiabá, Brazil	Brazil; Argentina
2011 Asian Championship	21–29 September 2011	Tehran, Iran	Iran; China
2011 African Championship	23–29 September 2011	Tangier, Morocco	Egypt
Wild card	5 October 2011	―	Russia; Poland
Total			12

FIVB World Ranking for second-place teams (as of January 15, 2011)

Rank	Team	Continent
5	United States	NORCECA
6	Italy	Europe
8	Argentina	South America
11	China	Asia
17	Cameroon	Africa

== Venues ==
Round	Site A	Site B
1st	Nippon Gaishi Hall, Nagoya	Kagoshima Arena, Kagoshima
2nd	Osaka Municipal Central Gymnasium, Osaka	Kumamoto Prefectural Gymnasium, Kumamoto
3rd	Fukuoka Convention Center, Fukuoka	Hamamatsu Arena, Hamamatsu
4th	Yoyogi National Gymnasium, Tokyo	Tokyo Metropolitan Gymnasium, Tokyo

== Format ==
The competition system of the 2011 World Cup for men was the single Round-Robin system. Each team played once against each of the 11 remaining teams. Points were accumulated during the whole tournament, and the final standing was determined by the total points gained.

The teams were divided into 2 groups of 6 teams each.
Rounds 1 + 2 (30 matches, 5 days): Teams played against teams in the same group
Rounds 3 + 4 (36 matches, 6 days): Teams played against teams in the other group

== Pool standing procedure ==
1. Match points
2. Number of matches won
3. Sets ratio
4. Points ratio
5. Result of the last match between the tied teams

Match won 3–0 or 3–1: 3 match points for the winner, 0 match points for the loser
Match won 3–2: 2 match points for the winner, 1 match point for the loser

== Results ==
Pos	Team	Pld	W	L	Pts	SW	SL	SR	SPW	SPL	SPR
1	Russia	11	10	1	29	30	8	3.750	916	781	1.173
2	Poland	11	8	3	26	30	15	2.000	1032	944	1.093
3	Brazil	11	8	3	24	29	14	2.071	983	857	1.147
4	Italy	11	8	3	24	28	15	1.867	1029	925	1.112
5	Cuba	11	7	4	20	25	19	1.316	964	964	1.000
6	United States	11	6	5	16	20	19	1.053	884	865	1.022
7	Argentina	11	5	6	16	21	21	1.000	929	925	1.004
8	Serbia	11	5	6	15	20	23	0.870	928	968	0.959
9	Iran	11	5	6	12	16	25	0.640	835	925	0.903
10	Japan	11	2	9	8	12	28	0.429	874	930	0.940
11	China	11	1	10	5	9	30	0.300	779	919	0.848
12	Egypt	11	1	10	3	7	30	0.233	755	905	0.834

All times are Japan Standard Time (UTC+09:00).

=== First round ===
==== Site A ====
Date	Time		Score		Set 1	Set 2	Set 3	Set 4	Set 5	Total	Report
20 Nov	11:10	Serbia	0–3	Argentina	20–25	13–25	18–25			51–75	P2 P3
20 Nov	15:10	Poland	3–0	Cuba	25–21	25–23	25–16			75–60	P2 P3
20 Nov	18:30	Iran	3–1	Japan	17–25	25–20	25–23	25–15		92–83	P2 P3
21 Nov	11:10	Cuba	3–0	Iran	25–17	25–17	25–22			75–56	P2 P3
21 Nov	15:10	Serbia	1–3	Poland	25–21	18–25	19–25	28–30		90–101	P2 P3
21 Nov	18:30	Argentina	3–2	Japan	25–22	21–25	11–25	25–15	15–12	97–99	P2 P3
22 Nov	11:10	Iran	3–2	Serbia	25–17	18–25	21–25	25–21	15–11	104–99	P2 P3
22 Nov	15:10	Poland	3–1	Argentina	18–25	25–20	25–23	25–22		93–90	P2 P3
22 Nov	18:30	Japan	0–3	Cuba	21–25	23–25	22–25			66–75	P2 P3

==== Site B ====
Date	Time		Score		Set 1	Set 2	Set 3	Set 4	Set 5	Total	Report
20 Nov	11:10	China	0–3	United States	14–25	23–25	21–25			58–75	P2 P3
20 Nov	15:10	Italy	1–3	Russia	25–22	22–25	22–25	21–25		90–97	P2 P3
20 Nov	18:30	Egypt	0–3	Brazil	19–25	13–25	19–25			51–75	P2 P3
21 Nov	11:10	Egypt	0–3	Italy	22–25	15–25	20–25			57–75	P2 P3
21 Nov	15:10	Brazil	3–1	United States	25–17	25–18	16–25	25–16		91–76	P2 P3
21 Nov	18:30	Russia	3–0	China	25–18	25–20	25–18			75–56	P2 P3
22 Nov	11:10	China	0–3	Egypt	20–25	20–25	18–25			58–75	P2 P3
22 Nov	15:10	Italy	3–2	Brazil	25–16	20–25	18–25	25–21	22–20	110–107	P2 P3
22 Nov	18:30	United States	0–3	Russia	18–25	18–25	24–26			60–76	P2 P3

=== Second round ===
==== Site A ====
Date	Time		Score		Set 1	Set 2	Set 3	Set 4	Set 5	Total	Report
24 Nov	11:10	Argentina	3–1	Cuba	17–25	25–16	25–21	25–17		92–79	P2 P3
24 Nov	15:10	Iran	3–2	Poland	23–25	28–26	8–25	26–24	15–11	100–111	P2 P3
24 Nov	18:30	Serbia	3–2	Japan	25–21	25–22	18–25	22–25	15–12	105–105	P2 P3
25 Nov	11:10	Iran	3–2	Argentina	15–25	25–21	24–26	25–16	15–12	104–100	P2 P3
25 Nov	15:10	Cuba	3–1	Serbia	17–25	25–21	25–22	25–17		92–85	P2 P3
25 Nov	18:30	Japan	1–3	Poland	25–23	21–25	19–25	18–25		83–98	P2 P3

==== Site B ====
Date	Time		Score		Set 1	Set 2	Set 3	Set 4	Set 5	Total	Report
24 Nov	11:10	Egypt	0–3	United States	19–25	20–25	20–25			59–75	P2 P3
24 Nov	15:10	Brazil	3–0	Russia	25–16	25–19	25–22			75–57	P2 P3
24 Nov	18:30	Italy	3–0	China	25–10	25–18	25–14			75–42	P2 P3
25 Nov	11:10	Russia	3–1	Egypt	25–18	25–17	23–25	25–9		98–69	P2 P3
25 Nov	15:10	China	2–3	Brazil	25–23	10–25	18–25	25–19	8–15	86–107	P2 P3
25 Nov	18:30	United States	1–3	Italy	39–41	22–25	25–22	21–25		107–113	P2 P3

=== Third round ===
==== Site A ====
Date	Time		Score		Set 1	Set 2	Set 3	Set 4	Set 5	Total	Report
27 Nov	11:10	Iran	0–3	United States	15–25	25–27	14–25			54–77	P2 P3
27 Nov	15:10	Poland	3–1	China	17–25	25–20	25–21	25–19		92–85	P2 P3
27 Nov	18:30	Japan	3–1	Egypt	27–29	25–17	25–23	25–12		102–81	P2 P3
28 Nov	11:10	Iran	3–0	Egypt	25–18	25–21	25–15			75–54	P2 P3
28 Nov	15:10	Poland	3–0	United States	25–15	25–20	25–18			75–53	P2 P3
28 Nov	18:30	Japan	3–0	China	25–23	25–20	26–24			76–67	P2 P3
29 Nov	11:10	Poland	3–0	Egypt	25–21	26–24	25–21			76–66	P2 P3
29 Nov	15:10	Iran	0–3	China	19–25	19–25	17–25			55–75	P2 P3
29 Nov	18:30	Japan	0–3	United States	37–39	16–25	15–25			68–89	P2 P3

==== Site B ====
Date	Time		Score		Set 1	Set 2	Set 3	Set 4	Set 5	Total	Report
27 Nov	11:10	Serbia	0–3	Russia	16–25	16–25	15–25			47–75	P2 P3
27 Nov	15:10	Argentina	0–3	Brazil	22–25	20–25	21–25			63–75	P2 P3
27 Nov	18:30	Cuba	3–1	Italy	25–21	19–25	25–20	25–17		94–83	P2 P3
28 Nov	11:10	Argentina	0–3	Russia	23–25	22–25	19–25			64–75	P2 P3
28 Nov	15:10	Cuba	3–2	Brazil	17–25	25–22	25–23	20–25	15–12	102–107	P2 P3
28 Nov	18:30	Serbia	1–3	Italy	20–25	18–25	25–22	20–25		83–97	P2 P3
29 Nov	11:10	Cuba	1–3	Russia	23–25	27–25	18–25	12–25		80–100	P2 P3
29 Nov	15:10	Italy	3–1	Argentina	34–36	25–20	25–19	25–20		109–95	P2 P3
29 Nov	18:30	Serbia	3–1	Brazil	27–25	20–25	25–20	25–22		97–92	P2 P3

=== Fourth round ===
==== Site A ====
Date	Time		Score		Set 1	Set 2	Set 3	Set 4	Set 5	Total	Report
2 Dec	11:10	Iran	0–3	Brazil	20–25	18–25	16–25			54–75	P2 P3
2 Dec	15:10	Poland	3–2	Italy	17–25	20–25	25–23	25–21	15–12	102–106	P2 P3
2 Dec	18:30	Japan	0–3	Russia	23–25	16–25	23–25			62–75	P2 P3
3 Dec	11:10	Iran	0–3	Russia	29–31	21–25	18–25			68–81	P2 P3
3 Dec	15:10	Poland	2–3	Brazil	25–18	25–21	18–25	19–25	12–15	99–104	P2 P3
3 Dec	18:30	Japan	0–3	Italy	22–25	24–26	22–25			68–76	P2 P3
4 Dec	11:10	Poland	2–3	Russia	23–25	25–23	22–25	25–17	15–17	110–107	P2 P3
4 Dec	15:10	Iran	1–3	Italy	13–25	17–25	25–20	18–25		73–95	P2 P3
4 Dec	18:30	Japan	0–3	Brazil	21–25	19–25	22–25			62–75	P2 P3

==== Site B ====
Date	Time		Score		Set 1	Set 2	Set 3	Set 4	Set 5	Total	Report
2 Dec	11:10	Serbia	3–1	Egypt	25–20	19–25	25–22	28–26		97–93	P2 P3
2 Dec	15:10	Cuba	3–2	China	25–21	18–25	26–28	25–20	15–13	109–107	P2 P3
2 Dec	18:30	United States	3-2	Argentina	27-29	25-14	25-17	20-25	15-12	112–0	P2 P3
3 Dec	11:10	Serbia	3–1	China	24–26	25–18	25–19	25–12		99–75	P2 P3
3 Dec	15:10	Argentina	3–0	Egypt	25–20	25–21	25–17			75–58	P2 P3
3 Dec	18:30	United States	3-2	Cuba	25–20	14-25	25-18	22–25	15–11	101–56	P2 P3
4 Dec	11:10	Cuba	3–1	Egypt	26–24	23–25	25–23	25–20		99–92	P2 P3
4 Dec	14:10	Argentina	3–0	China	25–23	31–29	25–18			81–70	P2 P3
4 Dec	17:10	Serbia	3–0	United States	25–23	25–17	25–19			75–59	P2 P3

== Final standing ==
Rank	Team
1st place, gold medalist(s)	Russia
2nd place, silver medalist(s)	Poland
3rd place, bronze medalist(s)	Brazil
4	Italy
5	Cuba
6	United States
7	Argentina
8	Serbia
9	Iran
10	Japan
11	China
12	Egypt

Qualified for the 2012 Summer Olympics

2011 Men's World Cup champions

Russia
6th title

Team roster
Biriukov, Apalikov, Khtey (c), Sivozhelez, Makarov, Tetyukhin, Sokolov, Yakovlev, Butko, Muserskiy, Kruglov, Mikhaylov, Volkov, Obmochaev
Head coach
Alekno

== Awards ==
- Most valuable player
  (Russia) Maxim Mikhaylov
- Best scorer
  (Cuba) Fernando Hernández
- Best spiker
  (Egypt) Ahmed Abdelhay
- Best blocker
  (Poland) Marcin Możdżonek
- Best server
  (Italy) Cristian Savani
- Best setter
  (Argentina) Luciano De Cecco
- Best receiver
  (Brazil) Sérgio Santos
- Best libero
  (China) Ren Qi
