= 2013 FIVB Volleyball Men's Club World Championship squads =

This article shows all participating team squads at the 2013 FIVB Volleyball Men's Club World Championship, held from 15 to 20 October 2013 in Betim, Brazil.

== Pool A ==
=== Trentino Diatec ===
- Head Coach: (Italy) Roberto Serniotti

Number	Player
2	(Italy) Giacomo Sintini
3	(Italy) Emanuele Birarelli (c)
4	(Argentina) Sebastián Solé
6	(Portugal) Alexandre Ferreira
7	(United States) Donald Suxho
9	(Italy) Antonio De Paola
10	(Italy) Filippo Lanza
11	(Bulgaria) Tsvetan Sokolov
12	(Hungary) Dávid Szabó
13	(Italy) Massimo Colaci (L)
15	(Italy) Michele Fedrizzi
17	(Italy) Matteo Burgsthaler

=== UPCN San Juan ===
- Head Coach: (Argentina) Fabián Armoa

Number	Player
1	(Argentina) Sebastián Fernández
2	(Argentina) Lucas Tell
4	(Argentina) Sebastián Garrocq
5	(Argentina) Gustavo Molina
7	(Brazil) Théo Lopes
8	(Argentina) Demián González (c)
9	(Romania) Bogdan Alexandru Olteanu
10	(Argentina) Nicolás Lazo
11	(Argentina) Rodrigo Peres Lopes
14	(Argentina) Javier Filardi
16	(Brazil) José Santos Júnior
18	(Argentina) Martín Ramos

=== Kalleh Mazandaran ===
- Head Coach: (Iran) Behrouz Ataei

Number	Player
1	(Iran) Farhad Salafzoun
2	(Iran) Milad Ebadipour
3	(Iran) Nasser Rahimi (L)
4	(Iran) Alireza Jadidi
5	(Iran) Vali Alipour
7	(Iran) Pourya Fayazi Damnabi
8	(Iran) Ali Sajjadi
9	(Iran) Alireza Nadi (c)
11	(Iran) Mojtaba Mirzajanpour
13	(Iran) Javad Hosseinabadi
17	(Iran) Reza Ghara
18	(Iran) Saber Narimannejad

=== Panasonic Panthers ===
- Head Coach: (Japan) Masashi Nambu

Number	Player
1	(Japan) Kunihiro Shimizu
2	(Japan) Hideomi Fukatsu
3	(Japan) Shinya Yamazoe
4	(Japan) Yuki Ito
5	(Japan) Sogo Watanabe
6	(Japan) Kenji Shirasawa (c)
8	(Japan) Shinji Kawamura
13	(Japan) Yusuke Matsuta
15	(Japan) Tatsuya Fukuzawa
16	(Japan) Takahisa Otake
17	(Japan) Takeshi Nagano (L)
18	(Brazil) Dante Amaral

== Pool B ==
=== Sada Cruzeiro ===
- Head Coach: (Argentina) Marcelo Méndez

Number	Player
2	(Brazil) Raphael Margarido
4	(Brazil) Douglas Cordeiro
5	(Brazil) Paulo Victor da Silva
7	(Brazil) William Arjona (c)
8	(Brazil) Wallace de Souza
9	(Cuba) Yoandry Leal
12	(Brazil) Isac Santos
14	(Venezuela) Luis Díaz
16	(Brazil) Éder Carbonera
17	(Brazil) Sérgio Nogueira (L)
18	(Brazil) Filipe Ferraz
20	(Brazil) Carlos Eduardo Silva

=== Lokomotiv Novosibirsk ===
- Head Coach: (Russia) Andrey Voronkov

Number	Player
1	(Russia) Andrei Zubkov
2	(Slovakia) Lukáš Diviš
4	(Russia) Artem Volvich
5	(Russia) Anton Mysin
7	(Russia) Arkady Kozlov
8	(Russia) Pavel Moroz
11	(Russia) Ilia Zhilin
12	(Russia) Aleksandr Butko (c)
13	(Russia) Valentin Golubev (L)
15	(Cuba) Oreol Camejo
16	(Russia) Anton Astashenkov
17	(Russia) Nikolay Leonenko

=== La Romana ===
- Head Coach: (Cuba) Osiel Vázquez

Number	Player
1	(Dominican Republic) Kelvyn Campechano
2	(Dominican Republic) Elnis Palomino
3	(Dominican Republic) Elvis Contreras
5	(Dominican Republic) Edwin Peguero (L)
6	(Dominican Republic) Pedro Luis García
7	(Dominican Republic) Mario Frias
8	(Dominican Republic) Tolinson Aquino (c)
9	(Dominican Republic) Luis Adamés
12	(Dominican Republic) José Alberto Castro
13	(Dominican Republic) Enmanuel Lara
15	(Dominican Republic) Henry Tapia
18	(Dominican Republic) Germán Recio

=== Sfaxien ===
- Head Coach: (Tunisia) Mohamed Ben Mustapha

Number	Player
2	(Tunisia) Mohamed Trabelsi
4	(Tunisia) Mohamed Ali Louati
5	(Tunisia) Samir Sellami (c)
6	(Tunisia) Omar Agrebi
7	(Tunisia) Mohamed Ben Abdallah
8	(Tunisia) Niaz Sallem
9	(Tunisia) Noureddine Hfaiedh
10	(Tunisia) Racem Siala
11	(Tunisia) Ismail Moalla
12	(Tunisia) Anouar Tawargui (L)
16	(Tunisia) Hakim Zouari
17	(Tunisia) Rami Bennour
