= 2017 Memorial of Hubert Jerzy Wagner squads =

Volleyball tournament held in Poland

This article shows the rosters of all participating teams at the 2017 Memorial of Hubert Jerzy Wagner in Kraków, Poland.

== Canada ==
The following is the Canadian roster in the 2017 Memorial of Hubert Jerzy Wagner.

Head coach:	Stéphane Antiga
Assistants:	Daniel Lewis, Georges Laplante

No.	Name	Date of birth	Height	Weight	Spike	Block	2016/17 club
1	TJ Sanders	December 14, 1991	1.91 m (6 ft 3 in)	81 kg (179 lb)	326 cm (128 in)	308 cm (121 in)	(Turkey) Arkas Izmir
3	Steven Marshall	November 23, 1989	1.93 m (6 ft 4 in)	87 kg (192 lb)	350 cm (140 in)	322 cm (127 in)	(Germany) Berlin Recycling Volleys
4	Nicholas Hoag	August 19, 1992	2.00 m (6 ft 7 in)	91 kg (201 lb)	342 cm (135 in)	322 cm (127 in)	(Italy) Revivre Milano
9	Jason DeRocco	September 19, 1989	1.98 m (6 ft 6 in)	94 kg (207 lb)	342 cm (135 in)	318 cm (125 in)	(Poland) Jastrzębski Węgiel
10	Sharone Vernon-Evans	August 28, 1998	2.02 m (6 ft 8 in)	94 kg (207 lb)	374 cm (147 in)	347 cm (137 in)	Team Canada Volleyball FTC
11	Daniel Van Doorn	March 21, 1990	2.07 m (6 ft 9 in)	98 kg (216 lb)	351 cm (138 in)	328 cm (129 in)	(France) Tours VB
12	Lukas Van Berkel	November 29, 1991	2.10 m (6 ft 11 in)	108 kg (238 lb)	350 cm (140 in)	328 cm (129 in)	(Switzerland) TV Amriswil
13	Ryley Barnes	October 11, 1993	2.00 m (6 ft 7 in)	92 kg (203 lb)	348 cm (137 in)	325 cm (128 in)	(France) Tours VB
15	Bryan Duquette	November 15, 1991	1.93 m (6 ft 4 in)	0 kg (0 lb)	0 cm (0 in)	0 cm (0 in)	(Germany) CV Mitteldeutschland
17	Graham Vigrass	June 17, 1989	2.05 m (6 ft 9 in)	97 kg (214 lb)	354 cm (139 in)	330 cm (130 in)	(Germany) Berlin Recycling Volleys
18	Bradley Gunter	December 5, 1993	1.98 m (6 ft 6 in)	91 kg (201 lb)	354 cm (139 in)	323 cm (127 in)	(Estonia) SC Duo
19	Blair Bann	February 26, 1988	1.84 m (6 ft 0 in)	84 kg (185 lb)	314 cm (124 in)	295 cm (116 in)	(Germany) SWD Powervolleys Düren
20	Arthur Szwarc	March 30, 1995	2.07 m (6 ft 9 in)	97 kg (214 lb)	356 cm (140 in)	335 cm (132 in)	Team Canada Volleyball FTC
21	Brett Walsh	February 19, 1994	1.95 m (6 ft 5 in)	84 kg (185 lb)	332 cm (131 in)	313 cm (123 in)	Team Canada Volleyball FTC

== France ==
The following is the French roster in the 2017 Memorial of Hubert Jerzy Wagner.

Head coach:	Laurent Tillie
Assistants:	Arnaud Josserand, Vincent Pichette

No.	Name	Date of birth	Height	Weight	Spike	Block	2016/17 club
2	Jenia Grebennikov	August 13, 1990	1.88 m (6 ft 2 in)	85 kg (187 lb)	345 cm (136 in)	330 cm (130 in)	(Italy) Cucine Lube Civitanova
4	Jean Patry	December 27, 1996	2.07 m (6 ft 9 in)	94 kg (207 lb)	337 cm (133 in)	314 cm (124 in)	(France) Montpellier UC
5	Trevor Clevenot	June 28, 1994	1.99 m (6 ft 6 in)	89 kg (196 lb)	335 cm (132 in)	316 cm (124 in)	(Italy) LPR Piacenza
6	Benjamin Toniutti (C)	October 30, 1989	1.83 m (6 ft 0 in)	73 kg (161 lb)	320 cm (130 in)	300 cm (120 in)	(Poland) ZAKSA Kędzierzyn-Koźle
7	Kevin Tillie	November 2, 1990	2.00 m (6 ft 7 in)	85 kg (187 lb)	347 cm (137 in)	327 cm (129 in)	(Poland) ZAKSA Kędzierzyn-Koźle
8	Julien Lyneel	April 15, 1990	1.92 m (6 ft 4 in)	87 kg (192 lb)	345 cm (136 in)	325 cm (128 in)	(Italy) Bunge Ravenna
10	Kevin Le Roux	May 11, 1989	2.09 m (6 ft 10 in)	98 kg (216 lb)	365 cm (144 in)	345 cm (136 in)	(Italy) Azimut Modena
11	Antoine Brizard	May 22, 1994	1.96 m (6 ft 5 in)	96 kg (212 lb)	340 cm (130 in)	310 cm (120 in)	(France) Spacer's de Toulouse
12	Stephen Boyer	April 10, 1996	1.96 m (6 ft 5 in)	85 kg (187 lb)	335 cm (132 in)	314 cm (124 in)	(France) Chaumont VB 52
14	Nicolas Le Goff	February 15, 1992	2.06 m (6 ft 9 in)	105 kg (231 lb)	365 cm (144 in)	328 cm (129 in)	(Turkey) İstanbul Büyükşehir Belediyesi
16	Daryl Bultor	November 17, 1995	1.97 m (6 ft 6 in)	94 kg (207 lb)	342 cm (135 in)	317 cm (125 in)	(France) Montpellier UC
18	Thibault Rossard	August 28, 1993	1.93 m (6 ft 4 in)	85 kg (187 lb)	350 cm (140 in)	320 cm (130 in)	(Poland) Asseco Resovia Rzeszów
21	Barthélémy Chinenyeze	February 28, 1998	2.00 m (6 ft 7 in)	80 kg (180 lb)	357 cm (141 in)	332 cm (131 in)	(France) Spacer's de Toulouse

== Poland ==
The following is the Polish roster in the 2017 Memorial of Hubert Jerzy Wagner.

Head coach:	Ferdinando De Giorgi
Assistants:	Piotr Gruszka, Oskar Kaczmarczyk

No.	Name	Date of birth	Height	Weight	Spike	Block	2016/17 club
1	Jakub Popiwczak	April 17, 1996	1.80 m (5 ft 11 in)	70 kg (150 lb)	313 cm (123 in)	0 cm (0 in)	(Poland) Jastrzębski Węgiel
2	Maciej Muzaj	May 21, 1994	2.08 m (6 ft 10 in)	86 kg (190 lb)	380 cm (150 in)	360 cm (140 in)	(Poland) Jastrzębski Węgiel
3	Dawid Konarski	August 31, 1989	1.98 m (6 ft 6 in)	93 kg (205 lb)	353 cm (139 in)	320 cm (130 in)	(Poland) ZAKSA Kędzierzyn-Koźle
5	Łukasz Kaczmarek	June 29, 1994	2.04 m (6 ft 8 in)	99 kg (218 lb)	354 cm (139 in)	332 cm (131 in)	(Poland) Cuprum Lubin
6	Bartosz Kurek	August 29, 1988	2.07 m (6 ft 9 in)	104 kg (229 lb)	375 cm (148 in)	340 cm (130 in)	(Poland) PGE Skra Bełchatów
7	Artur Szalpuk	March 20, 1995	2.02 m (6 ft 8 in)	91 kg (201 lb)	350 cm (140 in)	335 cm (132 in)	(Poland) PGE Skra Bełchatów
9	Bartłomiej Lemański	March 13, 1996	2.17 m (7 ft 1 in)	103 kg (227 lb)	360 cm (140 in)	345 cm (136 in)	(Poland) Asseco Resovia Rzeszów
10	Damian Wojtaszek	September 7, 1988	1.80 m (5 ft 11 in)	76 kg (168 lb)	330 cm (130 in)	301 cm (119 in)	(Poland) Asseco Resovia Rzeszów
11	Fabian Drzyzga	January 3, 1990	1.96 m (6 ft 5 in)	90 kg (200 lb)	335 cm (132 in)	325 cm (128 in)	(Poland) Asseco Resovia Rzeszów
12	Grzegorz Łomacz	October 1, 1987	1.87 m (6 ft 2 in)	81 kg (179 lb)	330 cm (130 in)	309 cm (122 in)	(Poland) Cuprum Lubin
13	Michał Kubiak (C)	February 23, 1988	1.93 m (6 ft 4 in)	87 kg (192 lb)	328 cm (129 in)	312 cm (123 in)	(Japan) Panasonic Panthers
14	Aleksander Śliwka	May 24, 1995	1.96 m (6 ft 5 in)	83 kg (183 lb)	342 cm (135 in)	325 cm (128 in)	(Poland) Indykpol AZS Olsztyn
15	Jakub Kochanowski	July 17, 1997	1.99 m (6 ft 6 in)	84 kg (185 lb)	348 cm (137 in)	313 cm (123 in)	(Poland) Indykpol AZS Olsztyn
16	Łukasz Wiśniewski	February 3, 1989	1.98 m (6 ft 6 in)	93 kg (205 lb)	347 cm (137 in)	335 cm (132 in)	(Poland) ZAKSA Kędzierzyn-Koźle
17	Paweł Zatorski	June 21, 1990	1.84 m (6 ft 0 in)	73 kg (161 lb)	328 cm (129 in)	311 cm (122 in)	(Poland) ZAKSA Kędzierzyn-Koźle
20	Mateusz Bieniek	April 5, 1994	2.10 m (6 ft 11 in)	98 kg (216 lb)	351 cm (138 in)	329 cm (130 in)	(Poland) ZAKSA Kędzierzyn-Koźle
21	Rafał Buszek	April 28, 1987	1.98 m (6 ft 6 in)	88 kg (194 lb)	347 cm (137 in)	327 cm (129 in)	(Poland) ZAKSA Kędzierzyn-Koźle

== Russia ==
The following is the Russian roster in the 2017 Memorial of Hubert Jerzy Wagner.

Head coach:	Sergey Shliapnikov
Assistants:	Sergio Busato, Yury Bulychev

No.	Name	Date of birth	Height	Weight	Spike	Block	2016/17 club
4	Artem Volvich	January 22, 1990	2.08 m (6 ft 10 in)	96 kg (212 lb)	350 cm (140 in)	330 cm (130 in)	(Russia) Zenit Kazan
5	Sergey Grankin	January 21, 1985	1.93 m (6 ft 4 in)	97 kg (214 lb)	351 cm (138 in)	320 cm (130 in)	(Russia) Belogorie Belgorod
6	Aleksey Ostapenko	May 26, 1986	2.08 m (6 ft 10 in)	94 kg (207 lb)	355 cm (140 in)	340 cm (130 in)	(Russia) Dinamo Moscow
7	Dmitry Volkov	May 25, 1995	2.01 m (6 ft 7 in)	88 kg (194 lb)	340 cm (130 in)	330 cm (130 in)	(Russia) Fakel Novy Urengoy
9	Yury Berezhko	January 27, 1984	1.98 m (6 ft 6 in)	90 kg (200 lb)	346 cm (136 in)	338 cm (133 in)	(Russia) Dinamo Moscow
10	Alexander Markin	July 28, 1990	1.97 m (6 ft 6 in)	95 kg (209 lb)	348 cm (137 in)	325 cm (128 in)	(Russia) Dinamo Moscow
11	Andrey Ashchev	May 10, 1983	2.02 m (6 ft 8 in)	105 kg (231 lb)	350 cm (140 in)	338 cm (133 in)	(Russia) Zenit Kazan
12	Aleksandr Butko	March 18, 1986	1.98 m (6 ft 6 in)	89 kg (196 lb)	329 cm (130 in)	327 cm (129 in)	(Russia) Zenit Kazan
15	Egor Feoktistov	June 22, 1993	2.01 m (6 ft 7 in)	90 kg (200 lb)	340 cm (130 in)	330 cm (130 in)	(Russia) Ural Ufa
16	Maxim Zhigalov	July 26, 1989	2.01 m (6 ft 7 in)	85 kg (187 lb)	345 cm (136 in)	330 cm (130 in)	(Russia) Belogorie Belgorod
17	Maxim Mikhaylov	August 13, 1990	2.02 m (6 ft 8 in)	103 kg (227 lb)	345 cm (136 in)	330 cm (130 in)	(Russia) Zenit Kazan
20	Ilyas Kurkaev	January 18, 1994	2.07 m (6 ft 9 in)	95 kg (209 lb)	355 cm (140 in)	335 cm (132 in)	(Russia) Lokomotiv Novosibirsk
21	Valentin Golubev	May 3, 1992	1.86 m (6 ft 1 in)	85 kg (187 lb)	330 cm (130 in)	325 cm (128 in)	(Russia) Lokomotiv Novosibirsk
22	Roman Martynyuk	April 13, 1987	1.81 m (5 ft 11 in)	75 kg (165 lb)	320 cm (130 in)	310 cm (120 in)	(Russia) Belogorie Belgorod
