= Dražen Luburić =

Serbian volleyball player (born 1993)

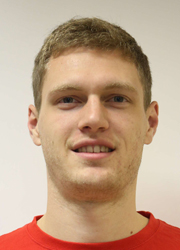
- Luburić as LPR Piacenza player

Personal information
- Born: 2 November 1993 (age 32); Novi Sad, Serbia, FR Yugoslavia
- Height: 2.05 m (6 ft 9 in)
- Weight: 90 kg (198 lb)
- Spike: 337 cm (133 in)
- Block: 331 cm (130 in)

Volleyball information
- Position: Opposite
- Current club: Zenit Kazan

Career
Years	Teams
2012–2015; 2015–2016; 2016; 2016–2017; 2017–2018; 2018–2019; 2019–2020; 2020–2023; 2023–2025; 2025–	Vojvodina Novi Sad; LPR Piacenza; Skra Bełchatów; JT Thunders; Zenit Saint Petersburg; Halkbank Ankara; Belogorie Belgorod; Lokomotiv Novosibirsk; Fenerbahçe; Zenit Kazan

National team
2015–	Serbia
Honours
Men's volleyball
Representing Serbia
FIVB World League
Gold medal – first place	2016 Kraków
CEV European Championship
Gold medal – first place	2019 Belgium/France/Netherlands/Slovenia
Bronze medal – third place	2017 Poland

Dražen Luburić (Serbian Cyrillic: Дражен Лубурић; born 2 November 1993) is a Serbian professional volleyball player who plays as an opposite spiker for Zenit Kazan and the Serbia national team.

== Career ==
On 17 July 2016, Serbia, including Luburić, won a gold medal at the 2016 World League. It was the first ever World League gold medal for Serbia and the first international success for Luburić.

He competed for Serbia at the 2024 Summer Olympics.

== Honours ==
=== Club ===
- CEV Challenge Cup
  - 2014–15 – with Vojvodina Novi Sad
- Domestic
  - 2014–15 Serbian Cup, with Vojvodina Novi Sad
  - 2018–19 Turkish SuperCup, with Halkbank Ankara
  - 2024–25 Turkish Cup, with Fenerbahçe
