= Sergey Savin (volleyball) =

Russian volleyball player (born 1988)

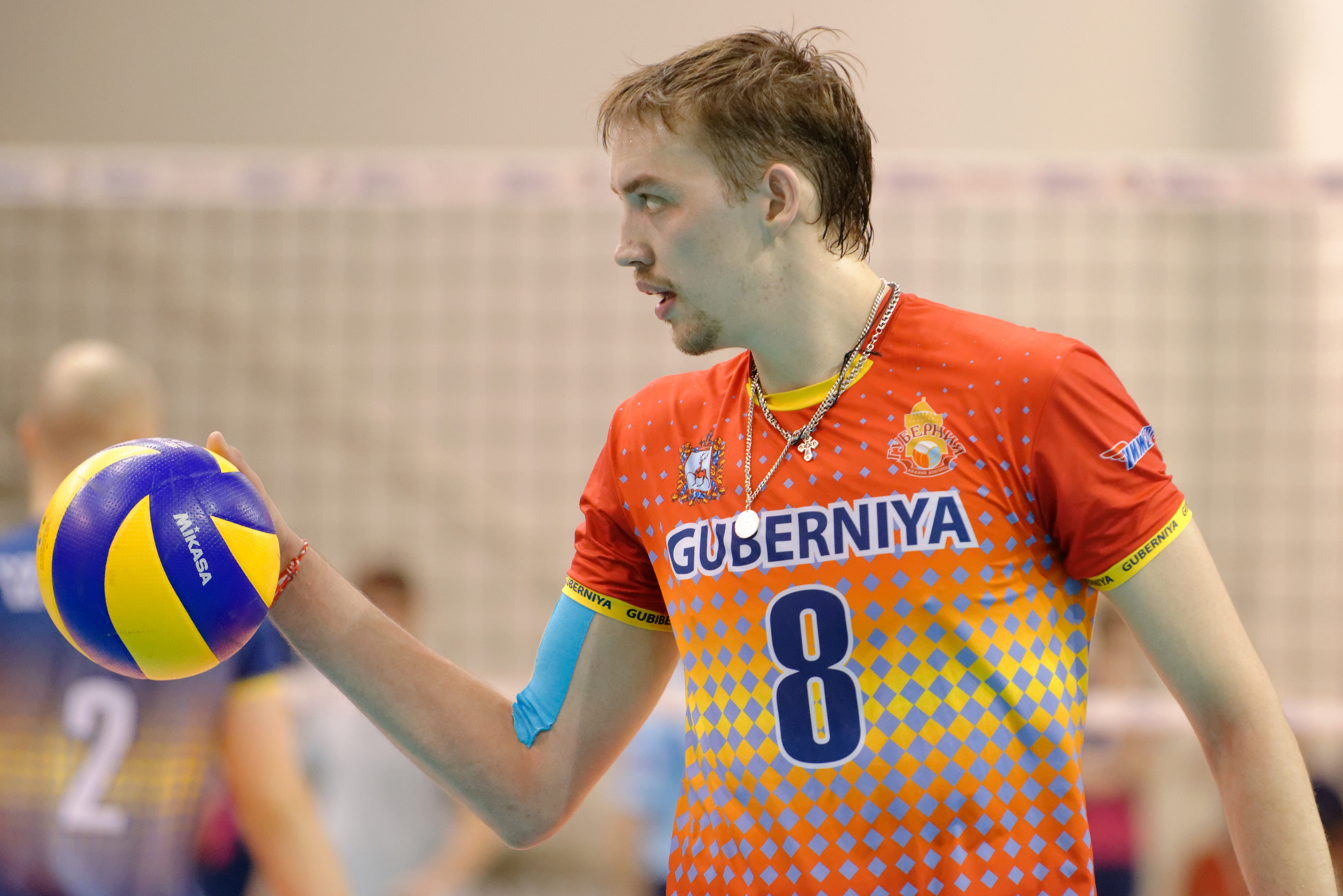

Personal information
- Full name: Sergey Aleksandrovich Savin
- Nationality: Russian
- Born: October 7, 1988 (age 38); Oral, Kazakhstan, USSR
- Height: 2.01 m (6 ft 7 in)
- Weight: 89 kg (196 lb)
- Spike: 320 cm (126 in)
- Block: 310 cm (122 in)

Volleyball information
- Position: Outside hitter
- Current club: Lokomotiv Novosibirsk
- Number: 8

Career
Years	Teams
2009–2012; 2012–2015; 2015–	Yugra Nizhnevartovsk; Guberniya Nizhniy Novgorod; Lokomotiv Novosibirsk

National team
2014–2015	Russia
- Last updated: 29 December 2017

Sergey Aleksandrovich Savin (Russian: Сергей Александрович Савин; born 7 October 1988) is a Russian volleyball player, a member of Russia men's national volleyball team and Russian club Lokomotiv Novosibirsk.

== Career ==
In season 2013/14 he won with his Russian team Guberniya Nizhniy Novgorod the silver medal at the CEV Cup.

== Sporting achievements ==
=== Clubs ===
==== CEV Cup ====
- 2013/2014 - with Guberniya Nizhniy Novgorod
