= Andrey Ashchev =

Russian volleyball player (born 1983)

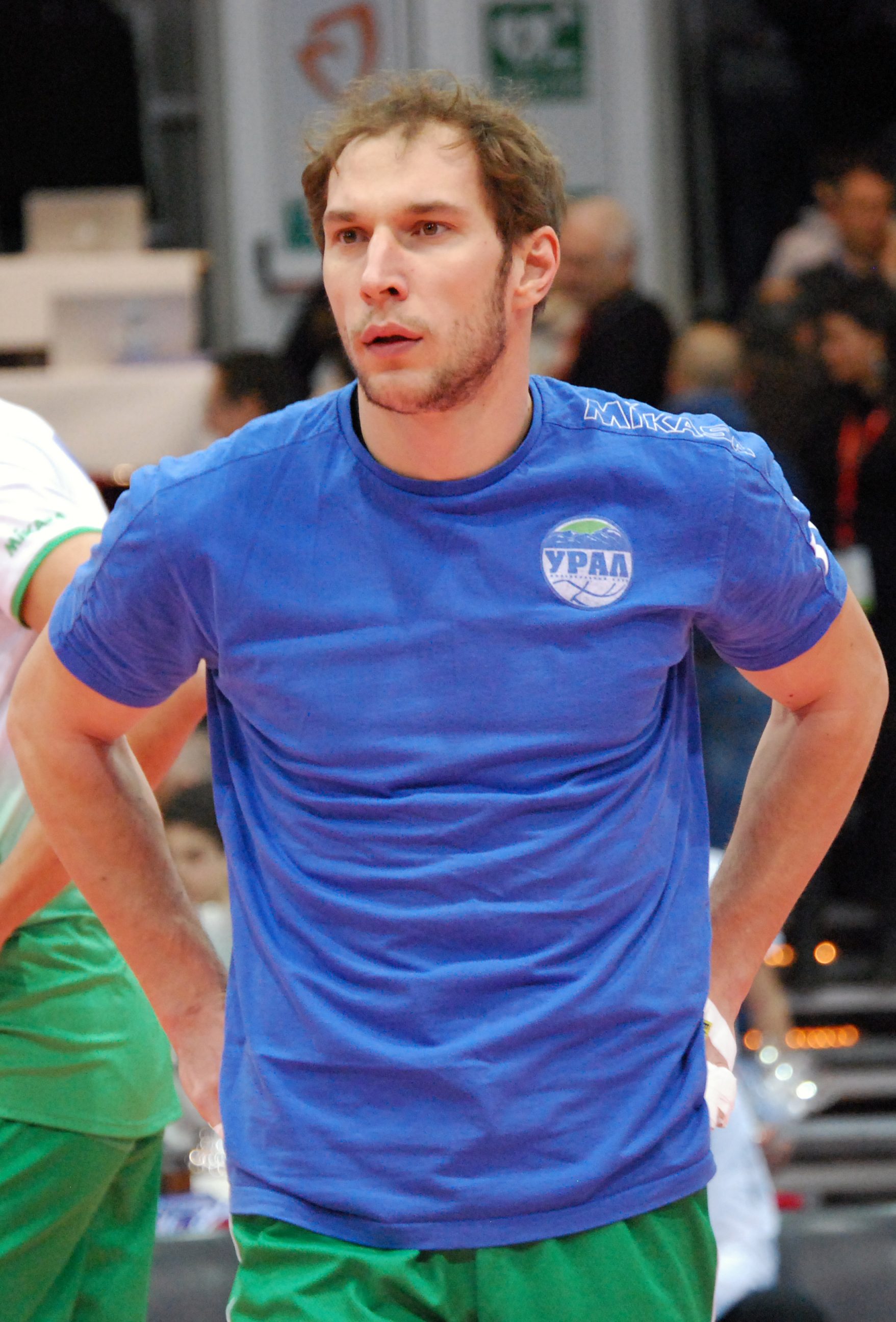

Personal information
- Full name: Andrey Viktorovich Ashchev
- Nationality: Russian
- Born: 10 May 1983 (age 43); Stavropol Krai, Russia, USSR
- Height: 2.02 m (6 ft 8 in)
- Weight: 105 kg (231 lb)
- Spike: 340 cm (134 in)
- Block: 327 cm (129 in)

Volleyball information
- Position: Middle blocker

Career
Years	Teams
2001–2003; 2003–2004; 2004–2005; 2005–2006; 2006–2012; 2012–2013; 2013–2014; 2014–2017; 2017–2020	MGTU Moscow; Dinamo Moscow; Luch Moscow; Fakel Novy Urengoy; Lokomotiv Novosibirsk; Ural Ufa; Dinamo Krasnodar; Zenit Kazan; Zenit Saint Petersburg

National team
2013–2017	Russia
Honours
Men's volleyball
Representing Russia
World Grand Champions Cup
Silver medal – second place	2013 Japan
World Cup
Gold medal – first place	2011 Japan
World League
Gold medal – first place	2013 Mar del Plata
European Championship
Gold medal – first place	2013 Denmark/Poland
Gold medal – first place	2017 Poland
- Last updated: 28 December 2017

Andrey Viktorovich Ashchev (Russian: Андрей Викторович Ащев; born 10 May 1983) is a Russian male volleyball player. He was part of the Russia men's national volleyball team at the 2014 FIVB Volleyball Men's World Championship in Poland. He played for Zenit Kazan. Andrey with national team winner of World league 2013 and Championship Europe 2013.

== Sporting achievements ==
=== Clubs ===
==== CEV Champions League ====
- 2015/2016 – with Zenit Kazan
- 2016/2017 – with Zenit Kazan

=== National team ===
- 2017 CEV European Championship

==== National championships ====
- 2015/2016 Russian Championship, with Zenit Kazan
