= Dmitry Lyzik =

Russian volleyball player (born 2000)

Personal information
- Nationality: Russian
- Born: 31 January 2000 (age 26)
- Height: 7 ft 1 in (2.16 m)
- Weight: 227 lb (103 kg)
- Spike: 144 in (365 cm)
- Block: 136 in (345 cm)

Volleyball information
- Position: Middle blocker
- Current club: (Russia) Lokomotiv Novosibirsk
- Number: 16

Career
- Years: Team
- 2018-: (Russia) Lokomotiv Novosibirsk

Dmitry Dmitrievich Lyzik (Russian: Дмитрий Дмитриевич Лызик; born 31 January 2000) is a Russian volleyball player, a member of the club Lokomotiv Novosibirsk.

== Sporting achievements ==
=== Clubs ===
Russia Championship:

- 2020
- 2021
