= VC Lokomotiv Novosibirsk =

Russian volleyball club

Lokomotiv Novosibirsk
- Full name: VC Lokomotiv Novosibirsk
- Founded: 1977
- Ground: SKK Sever (Capacity: 3,000)
- Chairman: Vadim Goncharov
- Manager: Plamen Konstantinov
- Captain: Ilyas Kurkaev
- League: Super League
- 2023/24: 5th place
- Website: Club home page

Uniforms
Home	Away

Lokomotiv Novosibirsk (Russian: ВК «Локомотив» Новосибирск) is a Russian professional volleyball club, based in Novosibirsk, playing in Russian Volleyball Super League.

== Achievements ==
- CEV Champions League
  (x1) 2013
- FIVB Club World Championship
  (x1) 2013
- Russian Championship
  (x1) 2020
  (x2) 2014, 2022
  (x2) 2017, 2021
- Russian Cup
  (x2) 2010, 2011

== Team rosters ==
Team roster - season 2021/2022

No.	Name	Date of birth	Position
1	(Russia) Roman Martynyuk	April 13, 1987 (age 38)	libero
2	(Canada) John Gordon Perrin	August 17, 1989 (age 36)	outside hitter
3	(Russia) Igor Tisevich	April 16, 1991 (age 34)	setter
4	(Russia) Semen Krivitchenko	March 6, 1995 (age 30)	libero
5	(Russia) Mikhail Nikkel	October 1, 1997 (age 28)	outside hitter
7	(Russia) Konstantin Abaev	June 17, 1999 (age 26)	setter
8	(Russia) Sergey Savin	October 7, 1988 (age 37)	outside hitter
9	(Serbia) Dražen Luburić	November 2, 1993 (age 32)	opposites
10	(Russia) Denis Chereiskii	January 25, 1995 (age 30)	middle blocker
13	(Russia) Alexander Tkachev	April 18, 1991 (age 34)	middle blocker
15	(Russia) Pavel Kruglov (C)	September 17, 1985 (age 40)	opposite
16	(Russia) Dmitry Lyzik	January 31, 2000 (age 25)	middle blocker
18	(Russia) Alexey Rodichev	March 24, 1988 (age 37)	outside hitter
20	(Russia) Ilyas Kurkaev	January 18, 1994 (age 31)	middle blocker
Head coach: (Bulgaria) Plamen Konstantinov

Team roster – season 2020/2021
No.	Name	Date of birth	Position
1	(Russia) Roman Martynyuk	April 13, 1987 (age 38)	libero
5	(Russia) Alexander Voropaev	October 13, 1993 (age 32)	setter
7	(Russia) Konstantin Abaev	June 17, 1999 (age 26)	setter
8	(Russia) Sergey Savin (C)	October 7, 1988 (age 37)	outside hitter
9	(Serbia) Dražen Luburić	November 2, 1993 (age 32)	opposite
10	(Russia) Dmitry Shcherbinin	September 10, 1989 (age 36)	middle blocker
11	(Russia) Denis Golubev	March 7, 2000 (age 25)	libero
13	(Russia) Alexander Tkachev	April 18, 1991 (age 34)	middle blocker
14	(Serbia) Marko Ivović	December 22, 1990 (age 34)	outside hitter
15	(Russia) Pavel Kruglov	September 17, 1985 (age 40)	opposite
16	(Russia) Dmitry Lyzik	January 31, 2000 (age 25)	middle blocker
18	(Russia) Alexey Rodichev	March 24, 1988 (age 37)	outside hitter
19	(Russia) Ilya Kazachenkov	January 30, 2001 (age 24)	outside hitter
20	(Russia) Ilyas Kurkaev	January 18, 1994 (age 31)	middle blocker
23	(Russia) Ivan Komarov	July 28, 1992 (age 33)	outside hitter
27	(Russia) Semen Krivitchenko	March 6, 1995 (age 30)	libero
30	(Russia) Igor Tisevich	April 16, 1991 (age 34)	setter
Head coach: (Bulgaria) Plamen Konstantinov

Team roster – season 2017/2018
No.	Name	Date of birth	Position
1	(Russia) Roman Martynyuk	April 13, 1987 (age 38)	libero
2	(Russia) Lukash Divish	February 20, 1986 (age 39)	outside hitter
6	(Russia) Nikolay Pavlov	May 22, 1982 (age 43)	opposite
7	(Russia) Artëm Smolyar	February 4, 1985 (age 40)	middle blocker
8	(Russia) Sergey Savin	October 7, 1988 (age 37)	outside hitter
9	(Germany) Georg Grozer	November 27, 1984 (age 40)	opposite
10	(Turkey) Arslan Ekşi	July 17, 1985 (age 40)	setter
11	(Russia) Alexander Tkachev	April 18, 1991 (age 34)	middle blocker
12	(Russia) Ivan Lukyanenko	June 25, 1996 (age 29)	setter
13	(Russia) Valentin Golubev	May 3, 1992 (age 33)	libero
17	(Russia) Mikhail Shcherbakov	July 13, 1985 (age 40)	middle blocker
18	(Russia) Alexey Rodichev	March 24, 1988 (age 37)	outside hitter
19	(Russia) Evgeny Volkov		outside hitter
20	(Russia) Ilyas Kurkaev	January 18, 1994 (age 31)	middle blocker
Head coach: (Bulgaria) Plamen Konstantinov

Team roster – season 2013/2014
No.	Name	Date of birth	Position
1	(Russia) Andrey Zubkov	July 14, 1981	setter
2	(Slovakia) Lukáš Diviš	February 20, 1986	outside hitter
4	(Russia) Artem Volvich	January 22, 1990	middle blocker
5	(Russia) Anton Mysin	March 10, 1986	outside hitter
7	(Russia) Arkady Kozlov	January 30, 1981	middle blocker
8	(Russia) Pavel Moroz	February 26, 1987	opposite
11	(Russia) Ilya Zhilin	May 10, 1985	outside hitter
12	(Russia) Alexander Butko	March 18, 1986	setter
13	(Russia) Valentin Golubev	May 3, 1992	libero
15	(Cuba) Oreol Camejo	July 22, 1986	outside hitter
16	(Russia) Anton Astashenkov	October 27, 1981	middle blocker
17	(Russia) Nikolay Leonenko	December 19, 1984	outside hitter
Head coach: (Russia) Andrei Voronkov

== Notable players ==
Notable, former or current players of club, who are medalist of intercontinental tournaments in national teams or clubs.

- 2006–2007
  2009–2016 (Russia) Alexander Butko
- 2007–2009 (Puerto Rico) Héctor Soto
- 2007–2010 (United States) William Priddy
- 2009–2010
  2014–2015 (United States) David Lee
- 2011–2012 (United States) Ryan Millar
- 2011–2014 (Russia) Ilya Zhilin
- 2011–2016 (Russia) Artem Volvich
- 2011–2018 (Slovakia) Lukash Divish
- 2012–2012 (United States) Clayton Stanley
- 2015–2016 (Serbia) Nikola Kovačević
- 2016–present (Russia) Ilyas Kurkaev
- 2017–2018 (Germany) Georg Grozer
- 2017–present (Russia) Roman Martynyuk
- 2018–2020 (Russia) Artem Ermakov
- 2018–2020 (Poland) Fabian Drzyzga
- 2018–2021
  2024–present (Serbia) Marko Ivović
- 2019–2024 (Russia) Pavel Kruglov
- 2020–2023 (Serbia) Dražen Luburić
- 2021–2022
  2023 (Canada) John Gordon Perrin
- 2022–2023 (Russia) Yury Berezhko
- 2024 (Brazil) Yoandy Leal
- 2024–present (Russia) Igor Kobzar

== See also ==
- Russia men's national volleyball team
