= Ilya Zhilin =

Russian volleyball player (born 1985)

Ilia Zhilin

Personal information
- Full name: Ilia Sergeyevich Zhilin
- Nationality: Russian
- Born: 10 May 1985 (age 41); Kirov, Russian SFSR, Soviet Union
- Height: 1.95 m (6 ft 5 in)
- Weight: 80 kg (176 lb)
- Spike: 340 cm (134 in)
- Block: 320 cm (126 in)

Volleyball information
- Position: Outside hitter
- Current club: TV Bühl
- Number: 6

Career
Years	Teams
2003–2004; 2004–2006; 2006–2007; 2007–2008; 2009–2010; 2010–2011; 2011–2014; 2014–2016; 2016–	Prikame Perm; Iskra Odintsovo; Yenisey Krasnoyarsk; Belogorie Belgorod; Dynamo-Yantar Kaliningrad; Fakel Novy Urengoy; Lokomotiv Novosibirsk; Dinamo Krasnodar; TV Bühl

National team
2009–	Russia
Honours
Men's volleyball
Representing Russia
World Grand Champions Cup
Silver medal – second place	2013 Japan
World League
Gold medal – first place	2013 Mar del Plata
European Championship
Gold medal – first place	2013 Copenhagen
- Last updated: 21 December 2017

Ilia Zhilin (born 10 May 1985) is a Russian male volleyball player. With his club Lokomotiv Novosibirsk he competed at the 2013 FIVB Volleyball Men's Club World Championship.
