= Nikolay Pavlov (volleyball) =

Russian volleyball player (born 1982)

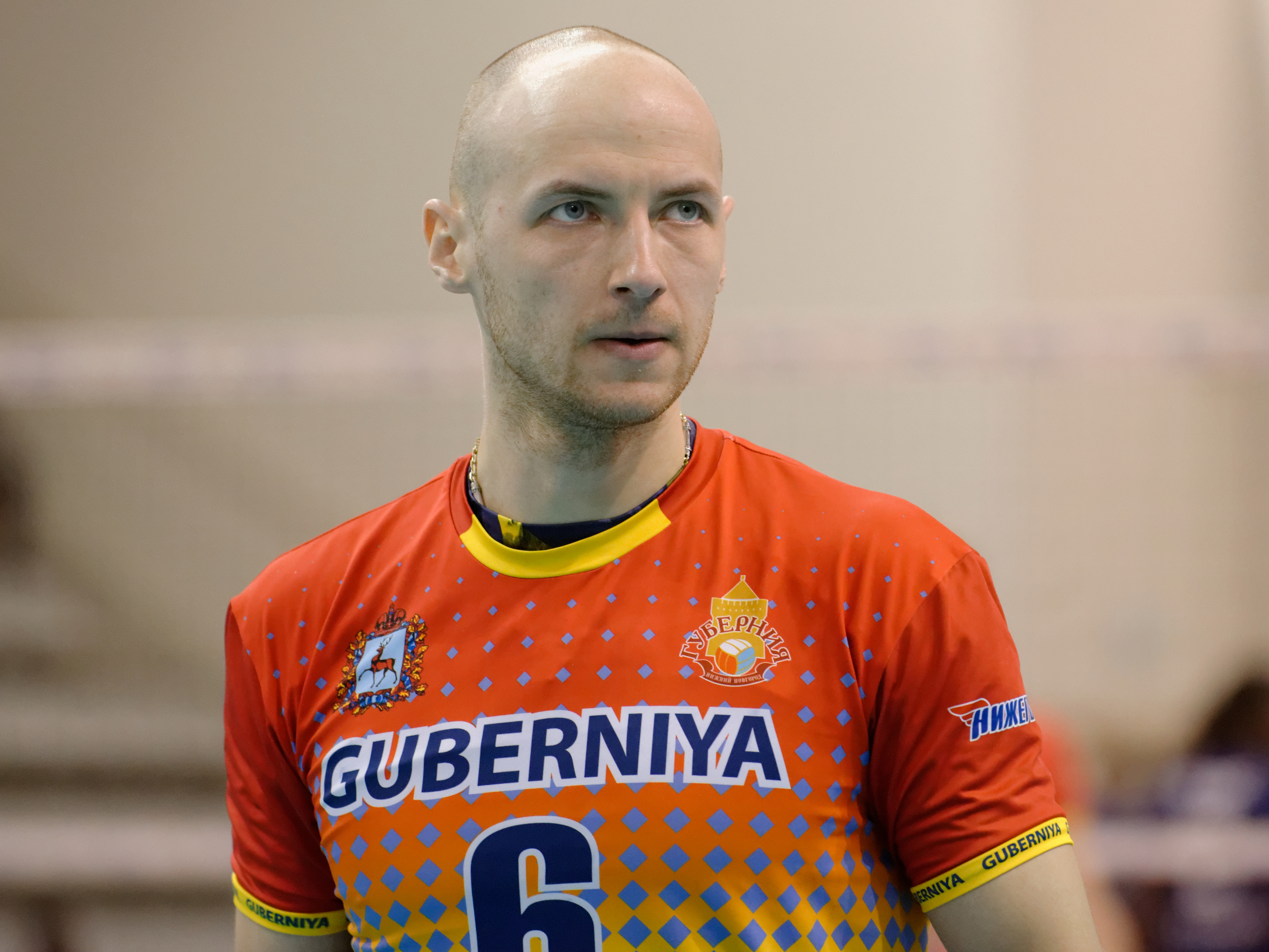

Personal information
- Full name: Nikolay Vladimirovich Pavlov
- Nationality: Russian
- Born: May 22, 1982 (age 44); Poltava, Ukraine SSR, USSR
- Height: 1.96 m (6 ft 5 in)
- Weight: 93 kg (205 lb)
- Spike: 342 cm (135 in)
- Block: 321 cm (126 in)

Volleyball information
- Position: Outside hitter

Career
Years	Teams
1999–2005; 2005–2006; 2007–2011; 2011–2012; 2012–2015; 2015–2016; 2016–2019; 2019–2020	Yurydychna Akademiya Kharkiv; Luch Moscow; Lokomotiv Novosibirsk; Dinamo Moscow; Guberniya Nizhniy Novgorod; Ninfa Latina; Lokomotiv Novosibirsk; Prievidza

National team
2002–2006; 2011–2018	Ukraine; Russia
Honours
Representing Russia
Men's volleyball
World Grand Champions Cup
Silver medal – second place	2013 Japan
European Championship
Gold medal – first place	2013 Denmark/Poland
World League
Gold medal – first place	2013 Mar del Plata
- Last updated: 30 December 2017

Nikolay Vladimirovich Pavlov (Russian: Николай Владимирович Павлов; born May 22, 1982) is a Russian and prior 2007 Ukrainian volleyball player who plays for the Russia men's national volleyball team and the Russian club Gubernija. Pavlov and his team won the 2013 World League and the 2013 European Championship. He was named MVP at the 2013 World League.

== Sporting achievements ==
=== CEV Cup ===
- 2011/2012, with Dinamo Moscow

=== Individual awards ===
- 2014 Russian Volleyball Super League - Most Valuable Player
- 2013 World League - Most Valuable Player
- 2012 CEV Cup - Most Valuable Player
- 2010 Cup of Russia - Most Valuable Player
- 2010 Cup of Russia - Best Scorer
