= Plamen Konstantinov =

Bulgarian volleyball player and coach

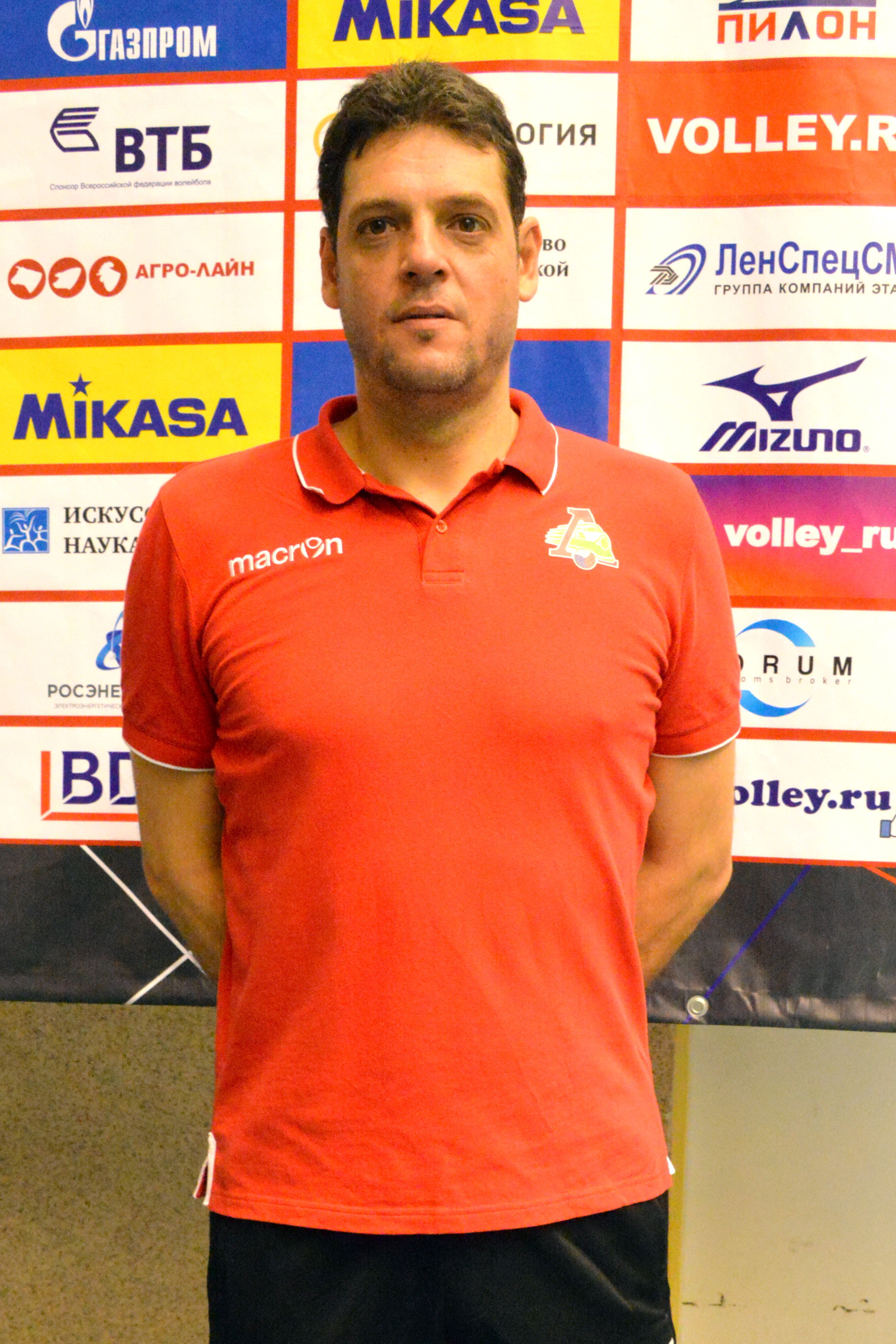

Personal information
- Full name: Plamen Georgiev Konstantinov
- Nickname: Gibona
- Nationality: Bulgarian
- Born: 14 June 1973 (age 53); Sofia, Bulgaria
- Height: 2.02 m (6 ft 8 in)

Coaching information
- Current team: (Russia) Lokomotiv Novosibirsk
Previous teams coached
| Years | Teams |
|---|---|
| 2010–2011; 2011–2012; 2012–2015; 2014–2018; 2016– 2022–2024 | Ziraat Bankası Ankara; Gazprom-Ugra Surgut; Guberniya Nizhny Novgorod; Bulgaria; Lokomotiv Novosibirsk; Bulgaria |

Volleyball information
- Position: Outside hitter

Career
| Years | Teams |
|---|---|
| 1986–1991; 1991–1995; 1995–1996; 1996–1997; 1997–1999; 1999–2000; 2000–2001; 2001–2002; 2002–2003; 2003–2004; 2004; 2004–2005; 2005–2006; 2006–2007; 2007–2009 | Levski Sofia; Slavia Sofia; AS Capurso Gioia; Aris Thessaloniki; Halkbank Ankara; Athlitikos Orestiadas; P.A.O.K. Thessaloniki; Iraklis Thessaloniki; Olympiacos Piraeus; Panathinaikos Athens; Tours VB; Gabeca Montichiari; Jastrzębski Węgiel; Gazprom-Ugra Surgut; Iraklis Thessaloniki |

National team
| 1995–2009 | Bulgaria |
Honours
Men's volleyball
Representing Bulgaria
FIVB World Championship
| Bronze medal – third place | 2006 Japan |
FIVB World Cup
| Bronze medal – third place | 2007 Japan |

Plamen Georgiev Konstantinov (Bulgarian: Пламен Георгиев Константинов; born 14 June 1973) is a former Bulgarian volleyball player. He is currently the head coach of Lokomotiv Novosibirsk.

== Personal life ==
Konstantinov was born in Sofia; both his parents, Georgi and Eva née Doycheva, are former volleyball internationals and his older brother Julian Konstantinov is an opera singer. Like his father, he bears the nickname Gibona ("The Gibbon").

== Career ==
Konstantinov finished a sports school and started his career with Levski Sofia in 1986, where he remained until 1995; he spent some of the following season with Slavia Sofia and then moved to Italy to play for the Gioia del Colle team. In 1996–97, he was a member of Greek Aris VC and then of Turkish Halkbank Ankara (1997–99). From 1999 until 2004 he played in Greece for Orestiada, PAOK Thessaloniki V.C., Iraklis V.C., Olympiacos S.C. and Panathinaikos VC. In 2004–05, he was with the French Tours VB and then in 2004–05 he represented the Montichiari team. In 2005–06, he played in Poland for Jastrzębski Węgiel and then in 2006–07 he was in Russia with ZSKA Gazprom Surgut. He ended his career in Iraklis, where he played from 2007 to 2009. With Iraklis Thessaloniki he won the silver medal at the 2008-09 Indesit Champions League and also was individually awarded "Best Receiver".

Konstantinov's awards and achievements include Bulgarian championship titles with Levski and Slavia, Greek championship titles with Aris, Iraklis, Olympiacos and Panathinaikois and a French championship title with Tours. He has also won the Greek Cup once and the Supercup twice with Iraklis and the Bulgarian Cup twice with Slavia. He has twice been awarded the Greek Championship Volleyball Player of the Year prize. In 2006, he won third-place bronze medals from the 2006 FIVB Men's World Championship and the 2007 FIVB Men's World Cup in Japan with the Bulgaria national team. In 2008, he was voted Bulgaria's Man of the Year in an online poll organized by Darik Radio.

== Coaching career ==
In 2010/11 season, he started his coaching career, as the coach of Ziraatbank of the Turkish Volleyball League. Plamen Konstantinov has been coaching the men's National Team of Bulgaria since 2014, following a stint in Turkey and several seasons at the helm of clubs in Russia - where he continues with Lokomotiv Novosibirsk during the club season.

== Awards ==
=== Individual ===
- 2008–09 CEV Champions League "Best Receiver"
- 2004 Greek Volley League "Most Valyable Player
