= 2013 FIVB Volleyball World League =

International sport competition

2013 World League
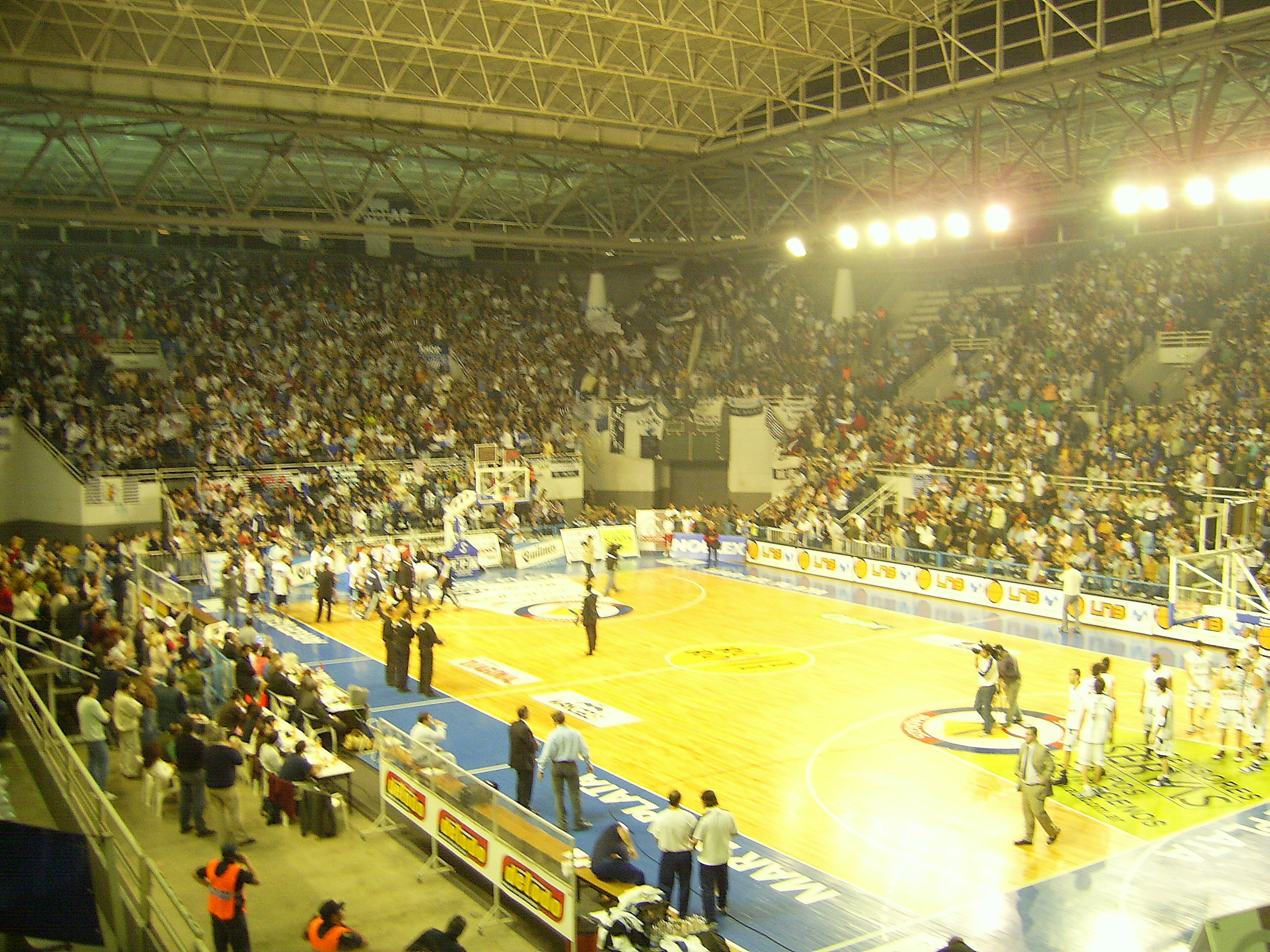
- The Polideportivo Islas Malvinas hosted the final

Tournament details
- Host country: Argentina
- City: Mar del Plata (Final)
- Dates: 31 May – 21 July
- Teams: 18 (from 5 confederations)
- Venues: 44 (in 44 host cities)

Final positions
- Champions: Russia (3rd title)
- Runners-up: Brazil
- Third place: Italy
- Fourth place: Bulgaria

Tournament awards
- MVP: (Russia) Nikolay Pavlov
- Best Setter: (Brazil) Bruno Rezende
- Best OH: (Brazil) Ricardo Lucarelli (Italy) Ivan Zaytsev
- Best MB: (Russia) Dmitriy Muserskiy (Italy) Emanuele Birarelli
- Best OPP: (Bulgaria) Tsvetan Sokolov
- Best Libero: (Brazil) Mário Pedreira

The 2013 FIVB Volleyball World League was the 24th edition of the annual men's international volleyball tournament, played by 18 countries from 31 May to 21 July 2013. The Final Round was held in Mar del Plata, Argentina.

== Qualification ==
- Top 14 teams of the 2012 edition directly qualified.
- Netherlands and Iran qualified through the qualification.
- Egypt and Japan were invited to participate in Pool C.
- Portugal (dropout from 2012 World League) replaced Egypt, who withdrew from the tournament.

Asia and Oceania	Europe	North America	South America
Iran; Japan; South Korea	Bulgaria; Finland; France; Germany; Italy Netherlands; Poland; Portugal; Russia; Serbia	Canada; Cuba; United States	Argentina; Brazil

== Format ==
- It is the first time the World League featured 18 teams, having had 16 teams from 2001–2003 and 2006–2012. The World League featured eight teams in its inaugural year in 1990, 10 in 1991 and then 12 from 1992–2000 and 2004–05.
- The top three world ranked teams in each pool were to play three matches at home and two away with the bottom three world ranked teams playing twice at home and three times away.

== Pools composition ==
Pools A and B are determined using the Serpentine system based on the FIVB World Ranking as of 13 August 2012. Pool C features teams ranked as the next best four in the World Ranking after the 12 teams in Pool A and B plus two additional teams, which were confirmed by the FIVB Executive Committee during its end of year meeting on 15 December 2012. The pools were announced on 1 December 2012.

Pool A	Pool B	Pool C
Brazil	Russia	Canada
Poland	Italy	South Korea
United States	Cuba	Finland
Bulgaria	Serbia	Netherlands
Argentina	Germany	Japan
France	Iran	Portugal

== Pool standing procedure ==
1. Match points
2. Number of matches won
3. Sets ratio
4. Points ratio
5. Result of the last match between the tied teams

Match won 3–0 or 3–1: 3 match points for the winner, 0 match points for the loser
Match won 3–2: 2 match points for the winner, 1 match point for the loser

== Intercontinental round ==
- All times are local.
- The Final Round hosts Argentina, the top two teams from Pool A and B and the winners of Pool C will qualify for the Final Round. If Argentina are one of the top two teams in Pool A, Pool A will send its top three teams.

=== Pool A ===
Pos	Team	Pld	W	L	Pts	SW	SL	SR	SPW	SPL	SPR	Qualification
1	Brazil	10	9	1	25	28	11	2.545	928	835	1.111	Final round
2	Bulgaria	10	7	3	19	23	15	1.533	865	855	1.012	Final round
3	France	10	5	5	15	21	23	0.913	966	971	0.995	
4	Poland	10	4	6	14	21	24	0.875	966	1006	0.960	
5	United States	10	4	6	12	18	21	0.857	913	877	1.041	
6	Argentina (Note: Qualified as hosts) (H)	10	1	9	5	11	28	0.393	817	911	0.897	Final round

(H) Host

==== Week 1 ====
Date	Time		Score		Set 1	Set 2	Set 3	Set 4	Set 5	Total	Report
7 Jun	17:55	Poland	1–3	Brazil	22–25	20–25	25–22	15–25		82–97	P2 P3
7 Jun	20:40	France	2–3	Bulgaria	21–25	25–14	25–21	22–25	11–15	104–100	P2 P3
7 Jun	19:10	United States	1–3	Argentina	18–25	21–25	25–22	24–26		88–98	P2 P3
8 Jun	19:10	United States	3–1	Argentina	22–25	27–25	25–19	25–16		99–85	P2 P3
9 Jun	18:10	France	0–3	Bulgaria	24–26	29–31	20–25			73–82	P2 P3
9 Jun	20:25	Poland	2–3	Brazil	26–28	22–25	25–23	25–20	10–15	108–111	P2 P3

==== Week 2 ====
Date	Time		Score		Set 1	Set 2	Set 3	Set 4	Set 5	Total	Report
14 Jun	20:30	Argentina	0–3	Brazil	20–25	21–25	15–25			56–75	P2 P3
14 Jun	19:10	United States	3–0	France	25–15	29–27	25–16			79–58	P2 P3
15 Jun	20:30	Argentina	0–3	Brazil	21–25	25–27	13–25			59–77	P2 P3
15 Jun	19:10	United States	3–2	France	22–25	25–22	24–26	30–28	15–9	116–110	P2 P3

==== Week 3 ====
Date	Time		Score		Set 1	Set 2	Set 3	Set 4	Set 5	Total	Report
21 Jun	20:10	France	3–2	Poland	25–23	21–25	22–25	25–21	15–11	108–105	P2 P3
22 Jun	20:10	Bulgaria	3–0	Argentina	25–18	25–21	25–16			75–55	P2 P3
23 Jun	18:10	France	3–2	Poland	25–21	23–25	25–20	21–25	15–13	109–104	P2 P3
23 Jun	20:10	Bulgaria	3–1	Argentina	17–25	25–19	25–21	31–29		98–94	P2 P3

==== Week 4 ====
Date	Time		Score		Set 1	Set 2	Set 3	Set 4	Set 5	Total	Report
28 Jun	10:00	Brazil	3–2	France	25–20	25–19	22–25	21–25	15–12	108–101	P2 P3
28 Jun	20:25	Poland	3–2	Argentina	26–24	19–25	19–25	25–17	15–8	104–99	P2 P3
28 Jun	19:40	United States	3–0	Bulgaria	25–19	25–22	25–21			75–62	P2 P3
29 Jun	10:10	Brazil	1–3	France	27–29	25–23	22–25	19–25		93–102	P2 P3
29 Jun	19:40	United States	1–3	Bulgaria	20–25	25–18	23–25	21–25		89–93	P2 P3
30 Jun	20:25	Poland	3–1	Argentina	18–25	25–21	26–24	25–17		94–87	P2 P3

==== Week 5 ====
Date	Time		Score		Set 1	Set 2	Set 3	Set 4	Set 5	Total	Report
5 Jul	10:00	Brazil	3–1	Bulgaria	24–26	25–17	25–20	25–23		99–86	P2 P3
5 Jul	20:25	Poland	3–2	United States	25–22	19–25	13–25	30–28	18–16	105–116	P2 P3
6 Jul	10:10	Brazil	3–1	Bulgaria	19–25	25–21	25–17	25–19		94–82	P2 P3
6 Jul	20:10	Argentina	2–3	France	18–25	18–25	25–17	25–22	11–15	97–104	P2 P3
7 Jul	20:25	Poland	3–1	United States	25–23	17–25	25–21	25–23		92–92	P2 P3
7 Jul	20:00	Argentina	1–3	France	23–25	20–25	25–22	19–25		87–97	P2 P3

==== Week 6 ====
Date	Time		Score		Set 1	Set 2	Set 3	Set 4	Set 5	Total	Report
12 Jul	20:08	Bulgaria	3–0	Poland	25–21	25–21	25–21			75–63	P2 P3
13 Jul	10:00	Brazil	3–1	United States	25–22	25–18	20–25	28–26		98–91	P2 P3
13 Jul	21:10	Bulgaria	3–2	Poland	20–25	23–25	25–21	25–21	19–17	112–109	P2 P3
14 Jul	09:45	Brazil	3–0	United States	25–21	26–24	25–23			76–68	P2 P3

=== Pool B ===
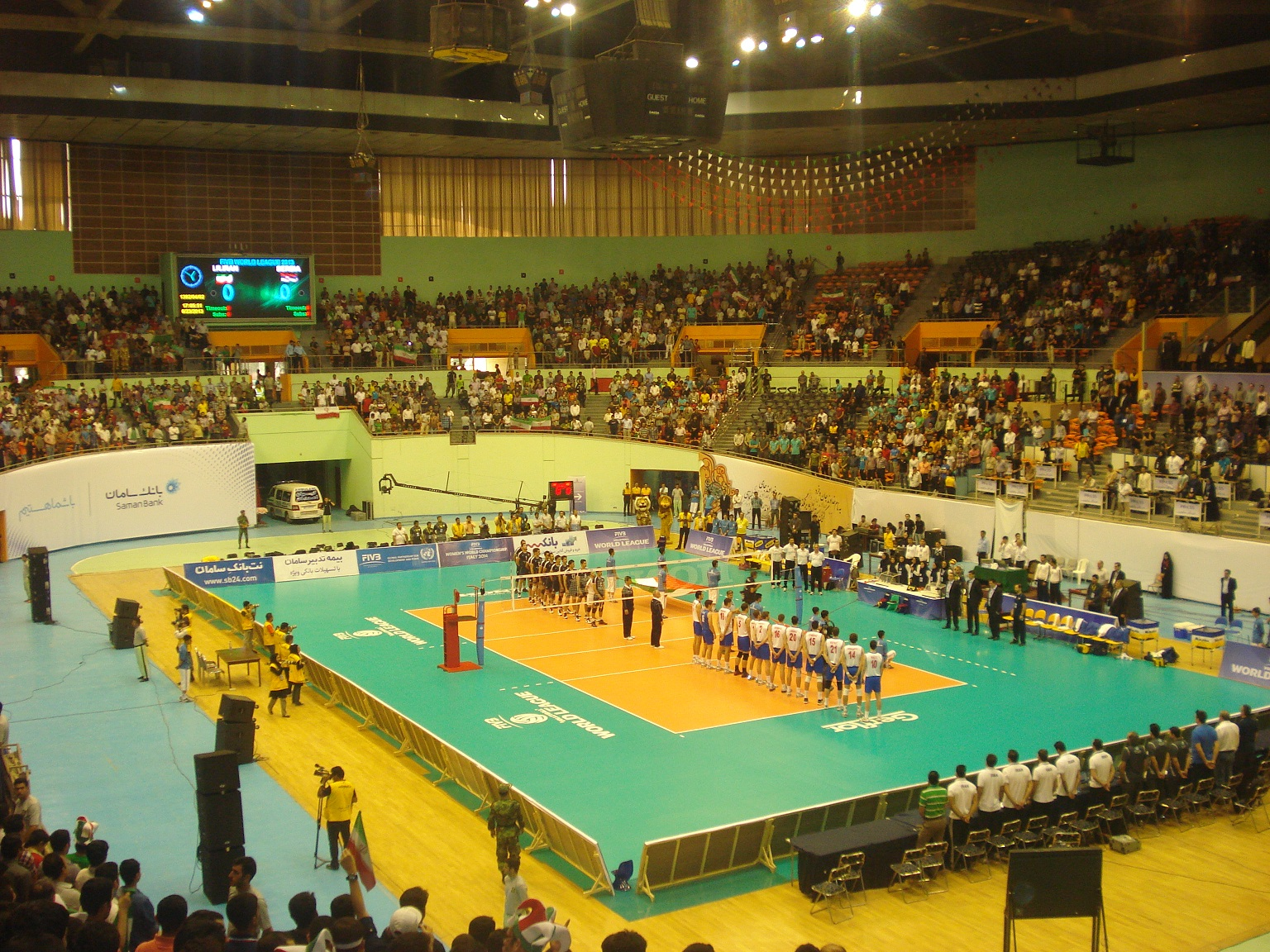
Second Iran-Serbia match – Tehran

Pos	Team	Pld	W	L	Pts	SW	SL	SR	SPW	SPL	SPR	Qualification
1	Italy	10	7	3	19	25	16	1.563	953	896	1.064	Final round
2	Russia	10	7	3	19	25	16	1.563	939	889	1.056	Final round
3	Germany	10	5	5	17	21	19	1.105	865	878	0.985	
4	Serbia	10	5	5	16	22	22	1.000	958	992	0.966	
5	Iran	10	5	5	15	20	21	0.952	929	898	1.035	
6	Cuba	10	1	9	4	9	28	0.321	794	885	0.897	

==== Week 1 ====
Date	Time		Score		Set 1	Set 2	Set 3	Set 4	Set 5	Total	Report
7 Jun	18:00	Russia	3–0	Iran	25–21	25–22	25–17			75–60	P2 P3
7 Jun	20:30	Italy	3–0	Germany	25–15	25–23	25–21			75–59	P2 P3
7 Jun	20:50	Cuba	1–3	Serbia	17–25	21–25	25–21	20–25		83–96	P2 P3
8 Jun	18:10	Russia	3–1	Iran	25–23	25–22	17–25	25–18		92–88	P2 P3
8 Jun	20:50	Cuba	1–3	Serbia	24–26	22–25	25–18	21–25		92–94	P2 P3
9 Jun	18:00	Italy	3–2	Germany	22–25	19–25	25–17	26–24	15–6	107–97	P2 P3

==== Week 2 ====
Date	Time		Score		Set 1	Set 2	Set 3	Set 4	Set 5	Total	Report
14 Jun	18:10	Russia	3–0	Serbia	29–27	25–14	25–20			79–61	P2 P3
14 Jun	20:00	Italy	3–0	Cuba	25–20	25–17	25–23			75–60	P2 P3
15 Jun	18:10	Russia	3–2	Serbia	25–23	24–26	22–25	25–18	15–8	111–100	P2 P3
16 Jun	20:10	Italy	3–0	Cuba	25–23	25–18	25–19			75–60	P2 P3

==== Week 3 ====
Date	Time		Score		Set 1	Set 2	Set 3	Set 4	Set 5	Total	Report
21 Jun	18:10	Russia	1–3	Italy	24–26	30–28	20–25	17–25		91–104	P2 P3
21 Jun	17:10	Iran	2–3	Serbia	24–26	23–25	25–17	25–14	16–18	113–100	P2 P3
22 Jun	18:10	Russia	3–2	Italy	25–23	25–23	26–28	23–25	15–12	114–111	P2 P3
22 Jun	19:00	Germany	3–0	Cuba	25–18	25–19	25–16			75–53	P2 P3
23 Jun	17:10	Iran	3–2	Serbia	25–20	24–26	23–25	25–22	15–12	112–105	P2 P3
23 Jun	17:00	Germany	3–1	Cuba	25–23	25–22	24–26	25–23		99–94	P2 P3

==== Week 4 ====
Date	Time		Score		Set 1	Set 2	Set 3	Set 4	Set 5	Total	Report
28 Jun	20:10	Italy	1–3	Iran	23–25	22–25	25–22	30–32		100–104	P2 P3
28 Jun	20:50	Cuba	0–3	Russia	20–25	23–25	23–25			66–75	P2 P3
29 Jun	20:11	Serbia	1–3	Germany	20–25	21–25	25–21	21–25		87–96	P2 P3
29 Jun	20:50	Cuba	3–1	Russia	25–23	20–25	25–20	25–22		95–90	P2 P3
30 Jun	19:13	Italy	3–2	Iran	25–22	25–20	20–25	18–25	15–13	103–105	P2 P3
30 Jun	20:11	Serbia	3–2	Germany	23–25	25–19	25–22	21–25	15–12	109–103	P2 P3

==== Week 5 ====
Date	Time		Score		Set 1	Set 2	Set 3	Set 4	Set 5	Total	Report
5 Jul	20:00	Germany	2–3	Russia	25–21	25–18	22–25	16–25	7–15	95–104	P2 P3
5 Jul	20:50	Cuba	2–3	Iran	26–24	25–19	19–25	22–25	14–16	106–109	P2 P3
6 Jul	20:10	Serbia	2–3	Italy	25–20	22–25	25–21	22–25	17–19	111–110	P2 P3
6 Jul	20:10	Germany	3–2	Russia	25–21	25–21	18–25	23–25	18–16	109–108	P2 P3
6 Jul	20:50	Cuba	1–3	Iran	25–22	20–25	18–25	22–25		85–97	P2 P3
7 Jul	20:10	Serbia	3–1	Italy	28–26	17–25	25–23	25–19		95–93	P2 P3

==== Week 6 ====
Date	Time		Score		Set 1	Set 2	Set 3	Set 4	Set 5	Total	Report
12 Jul	21:10	Iran	3–0	Germany	25–19	25–18	25–20			75–57	P2 P3
13 Jul	21:10	Iran	0–3	Germany	21–25	23–25	22–25			66–75	P2 P3

=== Pool C ===
Pos	Team	Pld	W	L	Pts	SW	SL	SR	SPW	SPL	SPR	Qualification
1	Canada	10	8	2	23	26	11	2.364	881	771	1.143	Final round
2	Netherlands	10	7	3	22	25	14	1.786	935	881	1.061	
3	South Korea	10	4	6	13	16	22	0.727	840	893	0.941	
4	Finland	10	4	6	12	18	21	0.857	864	896	0.964	
5	Portugal	10	4	6	11	16	24	0.667	908	949	0.957	
6	Japan	10	3	7	9	16	25	0.640	895	933	0.959	

==== Week 1 ====
Date	Time		Score		Set 1	Set 2	Set 3	Set 4	Set 5	Total	Report
31 May	18:40	Finland	3–0	Portugal	25–13	29–27	25–18			79–58	P2 P3
31 May	19:10	Canada	3–1	Netherlands	25–22	22–25	27–25	27–25		101–97	P2 P3
1 Jun	14:10	South Korea	3–1	Japan	25–22	25–20	21–25	25–19		96–86	P2 P3
1 Jun	18:40	Finland	2–3	Portugal	25–23	23–25	23–25	25–23	12–15	108–111	P2 P3
1 Jun	16:10	Canada	1–3	Netherlands	22–25	17–25	25–20	23–25		87–95	P2 P3
2 Jun	14:10	South Korea	3–1	Japan	25–21	25–23	11–25	25–22		86–91	P2 P3

==== Week 2 ====
Date	Time		Score		Set 1	Set 2	Set 3	Set 4	Set 5	Total	Report
7 Jun	19:10	Canada	3–0	Portugal	25–19	25–19	25–18			75–56	P2 P3
8 Jun	14:10	South Korea	0–3	Finland	23–25	23–25	20–25			66–75	P2 P3
8 Jun	16:46	Netherlands	3–1	Japan	18–25	25–20	25–22	25–17		93–84	P2 P3
8 Jun	19:10	Canada	1–3	Portugal	19–25	25–20	18–25	23–25		85–95	P2 P3
9 Jun	14:10	South Korea	2–3	Finland	25–23	18–25	24–26	25–15	14–16	106–105	P2 P3
9 Jun	13:43	Netherlands	3–0	Japan	25–20	25–21	25–18			75–59	P2 P3

==== Week 3 ====
Date	Time		Score		Set 1	Set 2	Set 3	Set 4	Set 5	Total	Report
14 Jun	19:10	Canada	3–0	South Korea	25–19	25–10	25–18			75–47	P2 P3
15 Jun	13:10	Japan	3–1	Finland	25–17	25–18	24–26	25–18		99–79	P2 P3
15 Jun	19:10	Canada	3–0	South Korea	25–23	25–20	25–20			75–63	P2 P3
16 Jun	13:10	Japan	3–1	Finland	23–25	25–21	25–19	25–22		98–87	P2 P3

==== Week 4 ====
Date	Time		Score		Set 1	Set 2	Set 3	Set 4	Set 5	Total	Report
22 Jun	16:40	Netherlands	2–3	Portugal	21–25	25–19	25–23	26–28	13–15	110–110	P2 P3
23 Jun	13:40	Netherlands	3–0	Portugal	36–34	25–23	25–22			86–79	P2 P3

==== Week 5 ====
Date	Time		Score		Set 1	Set 2	Set 3	Set 4	Set 5	Total	Report
28 Jun	18:40	Finland	1–3	Canada	13–25	25–22	21–25	20–25		79–97	P2 P3
29 Jun	14:20	South Korea	1–3	Netherlands	23–25	25–22	20–25	16–25		84–97	P2 P3
29 Jun	18:40	Finland	0–3	Canada	23–25	22–25	17–25			62–75	P2 P3
29 Jun	19:10	Portugal	3–1	Japan	25–22	20–25	26–24	25–15		96–86	P2 P3
30 Jun	14:20	South Korea	1–3	Netherlands	20–25	22–25	25–21	20–25		87–96	P2 P3
30 Jun	19:10	Portugal	2–3	Japan	25–22	23–25	30–28	22–25	10–15	110–115	P2 P3

==== Week 6 ====
Date	Time		Score		Set 1	Set 2	Set 3	Set 4	Set 5	Total	Report
5 Jul	18:40	Finland	1–3	Netherlands	25–23	23–25	23–25	23–25		94–98	P2 P3
6 Jul	14:10	Japan	1–3	Canada	11–25	21–25	25–23	20–25		77–98	P2 P3
6 Jul	18:40	Finland	3–1	Netherlands	25–19	26–24	20–25	25–20		96–88	P2 P3
6 Jul	19:10	Portugal	1–3	South Korea	18–25	25–22	23–25	21–25		87–97	P2 P3
7 Jul	14:10	Japan	2–3	Canada	23–25	25–23	27–25	18–25	7–15	100–113	P2 P3
7 Jul	19:10	Portugal	1–3	South Korea	32–34	23–25	25–21	26–28		106–108	P2 P3

== Final round ==
- Venue: Polideportivo Islas Malvinas, Mar del Plata, Argentina
- All times are Argentina Time (UTC−03:00).

=== Pool play ===
==== Pool D ====
Pos	Team	Pld	W	L	Pts	SW	SL	SR	SPW	SPL	SPR	Qualification
1	Italy	2	2	0	6	6	2	3.000	192	173	1.110	Semifinals
2	Bulgaria	2	1	1	3	4	4	1.000	187	191	0.979	Semifinals
3	Argentina	2	0	2	0	2	6	0.333	181	196	0.923	

Date	Time		Score		Set 1	Set 2	Set 3	Set 4	Set 5	Total	Report
17 Jul	21:11	Argentina	1–3	Bulgaria	26–28	23–25	25–20	23–25		97–98	P2 P3
18 Jul	21:10	Bulgaria	1–3	Italy	18–25	25–18	22–25	24–26		89–94	P2 P3
19 Jul	20:10	Italy	3–1	Argentina	25–20	23–25	25–17	25–22		98–84	P2 P3

==== Pool E ====
Pos	Team	Pld	W	L	Pts	SW	SL	SR	SPW	SPL	SPR	Qualification
1	Brazil	2	1	1	4	5	3	1.667	177	176	1.006	Semifinals
2	Russia	2	1	1	3	5	5	1.000	215	203	1.059	Semifinals
3	Canada	2	1	1	2	3	5	0.600	172	185	0.930	

Date	Time		Score		Set 1	Set 2	Set 3	Set 4	Set 5	Total	Report
17 Jul	17:41	Brazil	2–3	Russia	17–25	25–23	25–22	19–25	11–15	97–110	P2 P3
18 Jul	17:40	Russia	2–3	Canada	25–20	25–21	23–25	21–25	11–15	105–106	P2 P3
19 Jul	16:40	Canada	0–3	Brazil	18–25	28–30	20–25			66–80	P2 P3

=== Final four ===
Semifinals
20 July
Italy	1
Russia	3
20 July
Brazil	3
Bulgaria	1

Final
21 July
Russia	3
Brazil	0
3rd place match
21 July
Italy	3
Bulgaria	2

==== Semifinals ====
Date	Time		Score		Set 1	Set 2	Set 3	Set 4	Set 5	Total	Report
20 Jul	16:40	Italy	1–3	Russia	12–25	23–25	26–24	20–25		81–99	P2 P3
20 Jul	20:12	Brazil	3–1	Bulgaria	25–12	25–17	23–25	25–16		98–70	P2 P3

==== 3rd place match ====
Date	Time		Score		Set 1	Set 2	Set 3	Set 4	Set 5	Total	Report
21 Jul	16:40	Italy	3–2	Bulgaria	21–25	25–21	25–20	21–25	15–7	107–98	P2 P3

==== Final ====
Date	Time		Score		Set 1	Set 2	Set 3	Set 4	Set 5	Total	Report
21 Jul	20:12	Russia	3–0	Brazil	25–23	25–19	25–19			75–61	P2 P3

== Final standing ==
Rank	Team
1st place, gold medalist(s)	Russia
2nd place, silver medalist(s)	Brazil
3rd place, bronze medalist(s)	Italy
4	Bulgaria
5	Canada
6	Argentina
7	Germany
8	Serbia
9	Iran
10	France
11	Poland
12	United States
13	Cuba
14	Netherlands
15	South Korea
16	Finland
17	Portugal
18	Japan

2013 World League champions

Russia
3rd title

12-man Roster for Final Round
Makarov (c), Apalikov, Grankin, Sivozhelez, Pavlov, Spiridonov, Ashchev, Muserskiy, Verbov, Mikhaylov, Ermakov, Zhilin
Head coach
Voronkov

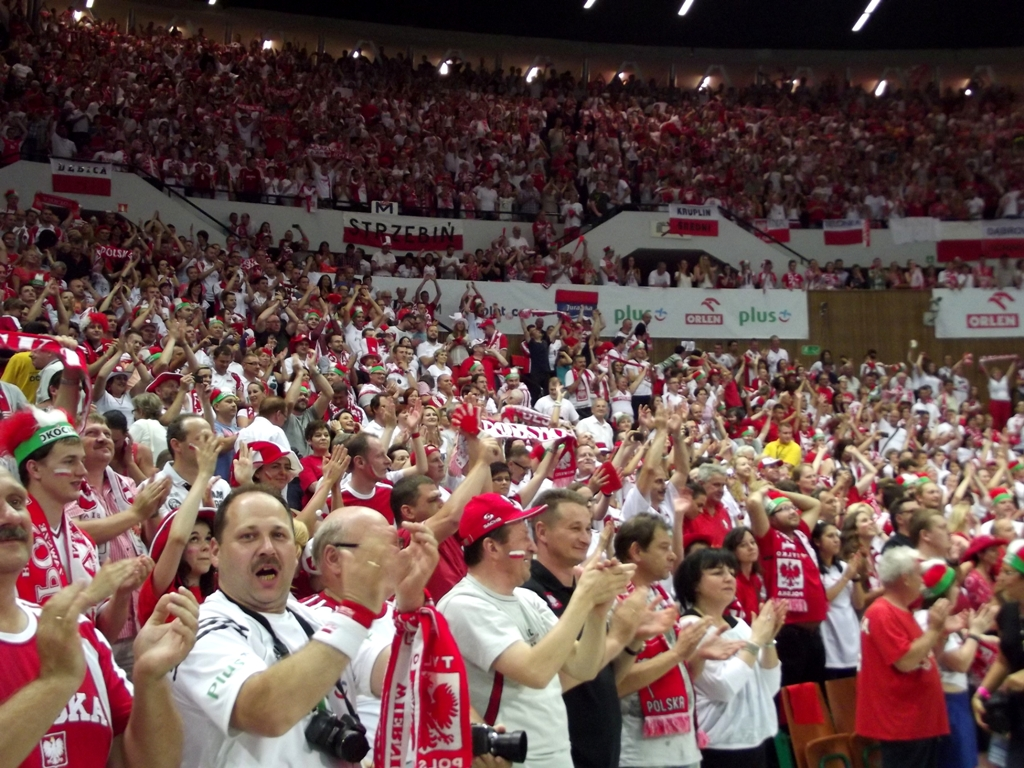
Polish fans at World League

== Awards ==
- Most valuable player
  (Russia) Nikolay Pavlov
- Best setter
  (Brazil) Bruno Rezende
- Best Outside Spikers
  (Italy) Ivan Zaytsev
  (Brazil) Ricardo Lucarelli
- Best Middle Blockers
  (Russia) Dmitriy Muserskiy
  (Italy) Emanuele Birarelli
- Best opposite spiker
  (Bulgaria) Tsvetan Sokolov
- Best libero
  (Brazil) Mário Pedreira
