= Raphael Margarido =

Brazilian volleyball player

Personal information
- Full name: Raphael Florêncio Margarido
- Nickname: Vinhedo
- Born: 28 April 1983 (age 43); Itapeva, São Paulo, Brazil
- Height: 1.86 m (6 ft 1 in)

Volleyball information
- Position: Setter

Career
Years	Teams
2004–2005; 2005–2007; 2007–2009; 2009–2010; 2010; 2010–2011; 2011–2012; 2012–2013; 2013–2014; 2014–2015; 2015–2016; 2016–2018; 2018–2019; 2019–2020	Esporte Clube Banespa; Unisul Esporte Clube; Sport Club Ulbra; Halkbank Ankara; Remat Zalău; Esporte Clube Pinheiros; Jastrzębski Węgiel; SL Benfica; Sada Cruzeiro; SL Benfica; SESI São Paulo; SL Benfica; Chemik Bydgoszcz; Jastrzębski Węgiel
Honours
Men's volleyball
Representing Brazil
Pan American Cup
Gold medal – first place	2011 Gatineau

Raphael Florêncio Margarido (born 28 April 1983) is a Brazilian former professional volleyball player.

== Honours ==
=== Clubs ===
- FIVB Club World Championship
  - Doha 2011 – with Jastrzębski Węgiel
  - Betim 2013 – with Sada Cruzeiro
- CSV South American Club Championship
  - Belo Horizonte 2014 – with Sada Cruzeiro
- CEV Challenge Cup
  - 2014/2015 – with SL Benfica
- National championships
  - 2004/2005 Brazilian Championship, with Esporte Clube Banespa
  - 2012/2013 Portuguese SuperCup, with SL Benfica
  - 2012/2013 Portuguese Championship, with SL Benfica
  - 2013/2014 Brazilian Cup, with Sada Cruzeiro
  - 2013/2014 Brazilian Championship, with Sada Cruzeiro
  - 2014/2015 Portuguese SuperCup, with SL Benfica
  - 2014/2015 Portuguese Cup, with SL Benfica
  - 2014/2015 Portuguese Championship, with SL Benfica
  - 2016/2017 Portuguese SuperCup, with SL Benfica
  - 2016/2017 Portuguese Championship, with SL Benfica
  - 2017/2018 Portuguese Cup, with SL Benfica

=== Youth national team ===
- 2002 CSV U21 South American Championship

=== Individual awards ===
- 2011: Pan American Cup – Best Setter
