= 2017 Men's European Volleyball Championship =

Volleyball tournament in Poland

Tournament details
- Host country: Poland
- Dates: 24 August – 3 September
- Teams: 16
- Venues: 5 (in 5 host cities)

Final positions
- Champions: Russia (2nd title)
- Runners-up: Germany
- Third place: Serbia
- Fourth place: Belgium

Tournament awards
- MVP: (Russia) Maxim Mikhaylov

Tournament statistics
- Matches played: 36
- Attendance: 211,736 (5,882 per match)

The 2017 Men's European Volleyball Championship was the 30th edition of the Men's European Volleyball Championship, organised by Europe's governing volleyball body, the CEV. The tournament was held in Poland between 24 August and 3 September.

Russia defeated Germany in the final to capture a record 14th title in the tournament. Serbia defeated Belgium for the bronze medal. Maxim Mikhaylov from Russia was elected the MVP.

== Qualification ==
Means of qualification	Qualifier
Host Country	Poland
2015 European Championship	France
2015 European Championship	Slovenia
2015 European Championship	Italy
2015 European Championship	Bulgaria
2015 European Championship	Russia
2015 European Championship	Serbia

Means of qualification		Qualifier
Second Round Winners	Pool A	Germany
Second Round Winners	Pool B	Finland
Second Round Winners	Pool C	Belgium
Second Round Winners	Pool D	Slovakia
Second Round Winners	Pool E	Netherlands
Second Round Winners	Pool F	Czech Republic
Third Round Winners		Turkey
Third Round Winners		Spain
Third Round Winners		Estonia

Total 16

== Pools composition ==
Pool A	Pool B	Pool C	Pool D
Poland	Italy	Russia	France
Serbia	Germany	Bulgaria	Belgium
Finland	Slovakia	Slovenia	Netherlands
Estonia	Czech Republic	Spain	Turkey

== Venues ==
Opening night (24 August)	Pool A	Pool B	Pool D, Play-off round, Quarterfinals	Pool C, Play-off round, Quarterfinals, Final four
Warsaw, Poland	Gdańsk, Poland	Szczecin, Poland	Katowice, Poland	Kraków, Poland
PGE Narodowy	Ergo Arena	Azoty Arena	Spodek	Tauron Arena
Capacity: 62,640	Capacity: 11,409	Capacity: 5,403	Capacity: 11,500	Capacity: 15,328

== Opening ==
A spine tingling Opening Ceremony including show acts, live music and fireworks attended by an all-time record-breaking crowd set the tone for a historic night at PGE National Stadium in Warsaw. The fans attended what the organisers called Volleyballand, as more than 65,000 people dressed in white-and-red outfits celebrated the sport.

== Pool standing procedure ==
1. Number of matches won
2. Match points
3. Sets ratio
4. Points ratio
5. Result of the last match between the tied teams

Match won 3–0 or 3–1: 3 match points for the winner, 0 match points for the loser
Match won 3–2: 2 match points for the winner, 1 match point for the loser

== Preliminary round ==
All times are local Central European Summer Time (UTC+2).

=== Pool A ===
Pos	Team	Pld	W	L	Pts	SW	SL	SR	SPW	SPL	SPR	Qualification
1	Serbia	3	3	0	8	9	2	4.500	261	239	1.092	Quarterfinals
2	Poland (H)	3	2	1	6	6	3	2.000	215	205	1.049	Playoffs
3	Finland	3	1	2	2	3	8	0.375	245	263	0.932	Playoffs
4	Estonia	3	0	3	2	4	9	0.444	276	290	0.952	

Source: CEV
(H) Host

Date	Time		Score		Set 1	Set 2	Set 3	Set 4	Set 5	Total	Report
24 Aug	17:30	Finland	3–2	Estonia	25–21	25–22	25–27	22–25	15–9	112–104	Report
24 Aug	20:30	Poland	0–3	Serbia	22–25	22–25	20–25			64–75	Report
26 Aug	17:30	Estonia	2–3	Serbia	23–25	25–16	25–21	20–25	12–15	105–102	Report
26 Aug	20:30	Finland	0–3	Poland	23–25	21–25	19–25			63–75	Report
28 Aug	17:30	Serbia	3–0	Finland	25–20	25–18	34–32			84–70	Report
28 Aug	20:30	Estonia	0–3	Poland	21–25	24–26	22–25			67–76	Report

=== Pool B ===
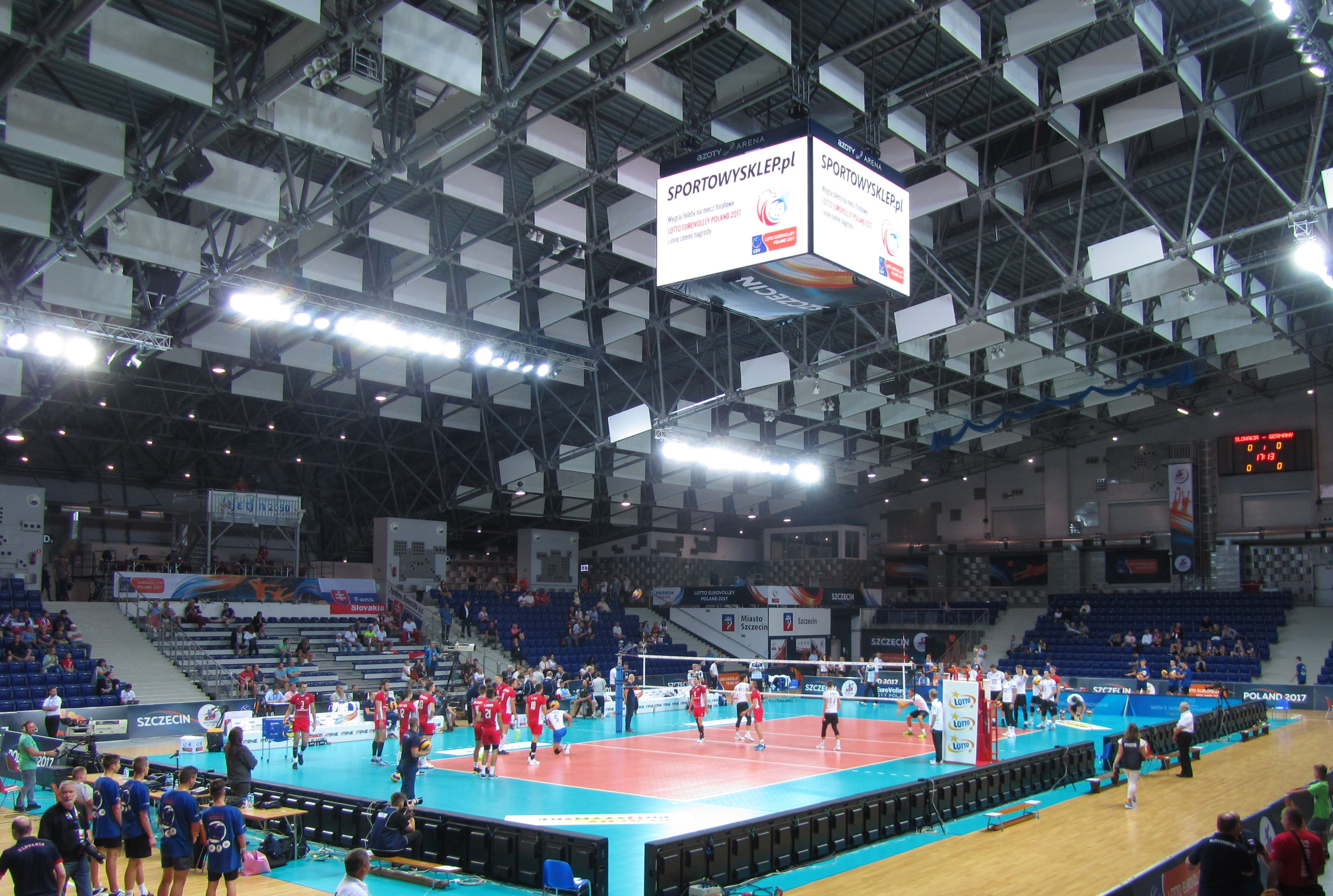
Slovakia against Germany

Pos	Team	Pld	W	L	Pts	SW	SL	SR	SPW	SPL	SPR	Qualification
1	Germany	3	3	0	8	9	2	4.500	256	217	1.180	Quarterfinals
2	Italy	3	2	1	7	8	3	2.667	255	233	1.094	Playoffs
3	Czech Republic	3	1	2	3	3	7	0.429	231	238	0.971	Playoffs
4	Slovakia	3	0	3	0	1	9	0.111	200	254	0.787	

Source: CEV

Date	Time		Score		Set 1	Set 2	Set 3	Set 4	Set 5	Total	Report
25 Aug	17:30	Czech Republic	3–1	Slovakia	25–19	28–30	25–16	25–17		103–82	Report
25 Aug	20:30	Germany	3–2	Italy	25–22	21–25	19–25	25–19	15–8	105–99	Report
27 Aug	17:30	Slovakia	0–3	Italy	14–25	19–25	20–25			53–75	Report
27 Aug	20:30	Czech Republic	0–3	Germany	19–25	14–25	20–25			53–75	Report
28 Aug	17:30	Slovakia	0–3	Germany	18–25	24–26	23–25			65–76	Report
28 Aug	20:30	Italy	3–0	Czech Republic	27–25	28–26	26–24			81–75	Report

=== Pool C ===
Pos	Team	Pld	W	L	Pts	SW	SL	SR	SPW	SPL	SPR	Qualification
1	Russia	3	3	0	9	9	0	MAX	232	192	1.208	Quarterfinals
2	Bulgaria	3	2	1	6	6	3	2.000	218	202	1.079	Playoffs
3	Slovenia	3	1	2	3	3	6	0.500	217	216	1.005	Playoffs
4	Spain	3	0	3	0	0	9	0.000	173	230	0.752	

Source: CEV

Date	Time		Score		Set 1	Set 2	Set 3	Set 4	Set 5	Total	Report
24 Aug	17:30	Bulgaria	0–3	Russia	23–25	20–25	19–25			62–75	Report
24 Aug	20:30	Spain	0–3	Slovenia	25–27	15–25	16–25			56–77	Report
26 Aug	17:30	Russia	3–0	Slovenia	27–25	30–28	25–22			82–75	Report
26 Aug	20:30	Bulgaria	3–0	Spain	25–15	28–26	25–21			78–62	Report
28 Aug	17:30	Slovenia	0–3	Bulgaria	22–25	26–28	17–25			65–78	Report
28 Aug	20:30	Russia	3–0	Spain	25–19	25–13	25–23			75–55	Report

=== Pool D ===
Pos	Team	Pld	W	L	Pts	SW	SL	SR	SPW	SPL	SPR	Qualification
1	Belgium	3	3	0	7	9	4	2.250	299	281	1.064	Quarterfinals
2	France	3	2	1	6	8	5	1.600	294	291	1.010	Playoffs
3	Turkey	3	1	2	4	5	7	0.714	277	276	1.004	Playoffs
4	Netherlands	3	0	3	1	3	9	0.333	263	285	0.923	

Source: CEV

Date	Time		Score		Set 1	Set 2	Set 3	Set 4	Set 5	Total	Report
25 Aug	17:30	Netherlands	1–3	Turkey	19–25	22–25	25–21	22–25		88–96	Report
25 Aug	20:30	France	2–3	Belgium	22–25	25–23	21–25	25–23	12–15	105–111	Report
27 Aug	17:30	Turkey	2–3	Belgium	22–25	25–22	25–21	25–27	16–18	113–113	Report
27 Aug	20:30	Netherlands	2–3	France	22–25	25–23	25–21	28–30	12–15	112–114	Report
28 Aug	17:30	Belgium	3–0	Netherlands	25–21	25–21	25–21			75–63	Report
28 Aug	20:30	Turkey	0–3	France	23–25	23–25	22–25			68–75	Report

== Championship round ==
=== Bracket ===
Playoffs
30 August – Kraków
Bulgaria	3
Finland	1
30 August – Katowice
France	1
Czech Republic	3
30 August – Kraków
Poland	0
Slovenia	3
30 August – Katowice
Italy	3
Turkey	0

Quarterfinals
31 August – Kraków
Serbia	3
Bulgaria	0
31 August – Katowice
Germany	3
Czech Republic	1
31 August – Kraków
Russia	3
Slovenia	0
31 August – Katowice
Belgium	3
Italy	0

Semifinals
2 September – Kraków
Serbia	2
Germany	3
2 September – Kraków
Russia	3
Belgium	0

Final
3 September – Kraków
Germany	2
Russia	3
Third place game
3 September – Kraków
Serbia	3
Belgium	2

=== Playoffs ===
Date	Time		Score		Set 1	Set 2	Set 3	Set 4	Set 5	Total	Report
30 Aug	17:30	Bulgaria	3–1	Finland	23–25	25–21	25–11	25–12		98–69	Report
30 Aug	17:30	Italy	3–0	Turkey	25–16	25–17	31–29			81–62	Report
30 Aug	20:30	Poland	0–3	Slovenia	21–25	21–25	19–25			61–75	Report
30 Aug	20:30	France	1–3	Czech Republic	21–25	25–21	21–25	20–25		87–96	Report

=== Quarterfinals ===
Date	Time		Score		Set 1	Set 2	Set 3	Set 4	Set 5	Total	Report
31 Aug	17:30	Russia	3–0	Slovenia	25–17	25–19	25–19			75–55	Report
31 Aug	17:30	Germany	3–1	Czech Republic	25–22	16–25	25–23	25–20		91–90	Report
31 Aug	20:30	Serbia	3–0	Bulgaria	25–21	25–22	28–26			78–69	Report
31 Aug	20:30	Belgium	3–0	Italy	25–21	25–11	25–23			75–55	Report

=== Semifinals ===
Date	Time		Score		Set 1	Set 2	Set 3	Set 4	Set 5	Total	Report
2 Sep	17:30	Serbia	2–3	Germany	26–24	25–15	18–25	25–27	13–15	107–106	Report
2 Sep	20:30	Russia	3–0	Belgium	25–14	25–17	25–17			75–48	Report

=== Third place game ===
Date	Time		Score		Set 1	Set 2	Set 3	Set 4	Set 5	Total	Report
3 Sep	17:30	Serbia	3–2	Belgium	25–17	22–25	19–25	25–22	15–12	106–101	Report

=== Final ===
Date	Time		Score		Set 1	Set 2	Set 3	Set 4	Set 5	Total	Report
3 Sep	20:30	Germany	2–3	Russia	19–25	25–20	22–25	25–17	13–15	104–102	Report

== Final standing ==
Rank	Team
1st place, gold medalist(s)	Russia
2nd place, silver medalist(s)	Germany
3rd place, bronze medalist(s)	Serbia
4	Belgium
5	Italy
6	Bulgaria
7	Czech Republic
8	Slovenia
9	France
10	Poland
11	Turkey
12	Finland
13	Estonia
14	Netherlands
15	Slovakia
16	Spain

2017 Men's European champions

Russia
14th title

14–man roster
Ilia Vlasov, Artem Volvich, Sergey Grankin (c), Dmitry Volkov, Yury Berezhko, Andrey Ashchev, Aleksandr Butko, Egor Feoktistov, Maksim Zhigalov, Maxim Mikhaylov, Egor Kliuka, Ilyas Kurkaev, Valentin Golubev, Roman Martynyuk
Head coach
Sergey Shlyapnikov

== Awards ==
- Most valuable player
  (Russia) Maxim Mikhaylov
- Best setter
  (Russia) Sergey Grankin
- Best outside spikers
  (Germany) Denis Kaliberda
  (Russia) Dmitry Volkov
- Best middle blockers
  (Serbia) Srećko Lisinac
  (Germany) Marcus Böhme
- Best opposite spiker
  (Germany) György Grozer
- Best libero
  (Belgium) Lowie Stuer

== See also ==
- 2017 Women's European Volleyball Championship
