= Pavel Moroz =

Russian volleyball player (born 1987)

Personal information
- Full name: Pavel Vasilievitch Moroz
- Nationality: Ukrainian; Russian
- Born: February 26, 1987 (age 39); Chervonohrad, Ukraine, USSR
- Hometown: Moscow, Russia
- Height: 2.05 m (6 ft 9 in)
- Weight: 105 kg (231 lb)
- Spike: 352 cm (139 in)
- Block: 343 cm (135 in)

Volleyball information
- Position: Opposite
- Current club: Al Wasl SC
- Number: 18

Career
Years	Teams
2004–2010; 2010–2013; 2013–2015; 2015–2016; 2016–2017; 2017–2018; 2018; 2020–2021; 2022–	MGTU Moscow; Kuzbass Kemerovo; Lokomotiv Novosibirsk; Korean Air Jumbos; Ural Ufa; Fakel Novy Urengoy; Dynamo-LO; Neftyanik Orenburg; Al Wasl SC

National team
2012–2015	Russia
- Last updated: 29 September 2023

Pavel Vasilievitch Moroz (born 26 February 1987) is a Russian volleyball player of Ukrainian origin, a member of Emirati club Al Wasl SC.

== Career ==
=== Clubs ===
In 2013 he went to Lokomotiv Novosibirsk. In April 2015 Moroz extended contract with this club.

=== Doping suspension ===
In 2019 and 2022, he was suspended for an anti-doping rule violation by WADA.
