= 2013 FIVB Volleyball Men's Club World Championship =

2013 Men's Club World Championship
Tournament details
- Host country: Brazil
- Dates: 15–20 October
- Teams: 8 (from 5 confederations)
- Venue: 1 (in 1 host city)

Final positions
- Champions: (Brazil) Sada Cruzeiro (1st title)

Tournament awards
- MVP: (Brazil) Wallace de Souza (SDC)

The 2013 FIVB Volleyball Men's Club World Championship was the 9th edition of the event. It was held in Betim, Brazil from 15 to 20 October 2013. Sada Cruzeiro won the title for the first time in front their home crowd. Wallace de Souza was named Most Valuable Player.

== Qualification ==
Team (Confederation)	Qualified as
(Brazil) Sada Cruzeiro (CSV)	Hosts
(Tunisia) Sfaxien (CAVB)	2013 African Champions
(Iran) Kalleh Mazandaran (AVC)	2013 Asian Champions
(Russia) Lokomotiv Novosibirsk (CEV)	2013 European Champions
(Dominican Republic) La Romana (NORCECA)	2013 NORCECA Representatives
(Argentina) UPCN San Juan (CSV)	2013 South American Champions
(Italy) Trentino Diatec (CEV)	Wild Card (2012 World Champions)
(Japan) Panasonic Panthers (AVC)	Wild Card (Special Invitation)

== Pools composition ==
Pool A	Pool B
(Italy) Trentino Diatec	(Brazil) Sada Cruzeiro
(Argentina) UPCN San Juan	(Russia) Lokomotiv Novosibirsk
(Iran) Kalleh Mazandaran	(Dominican Republic) La Romana
(Japan) Panasonic Panthers	(Tunisia) Sfaxien

== Venue ==
All matches
Betim, Brazil
Ginásio Poliesportivo Divino Braga
Capacity: 6,000
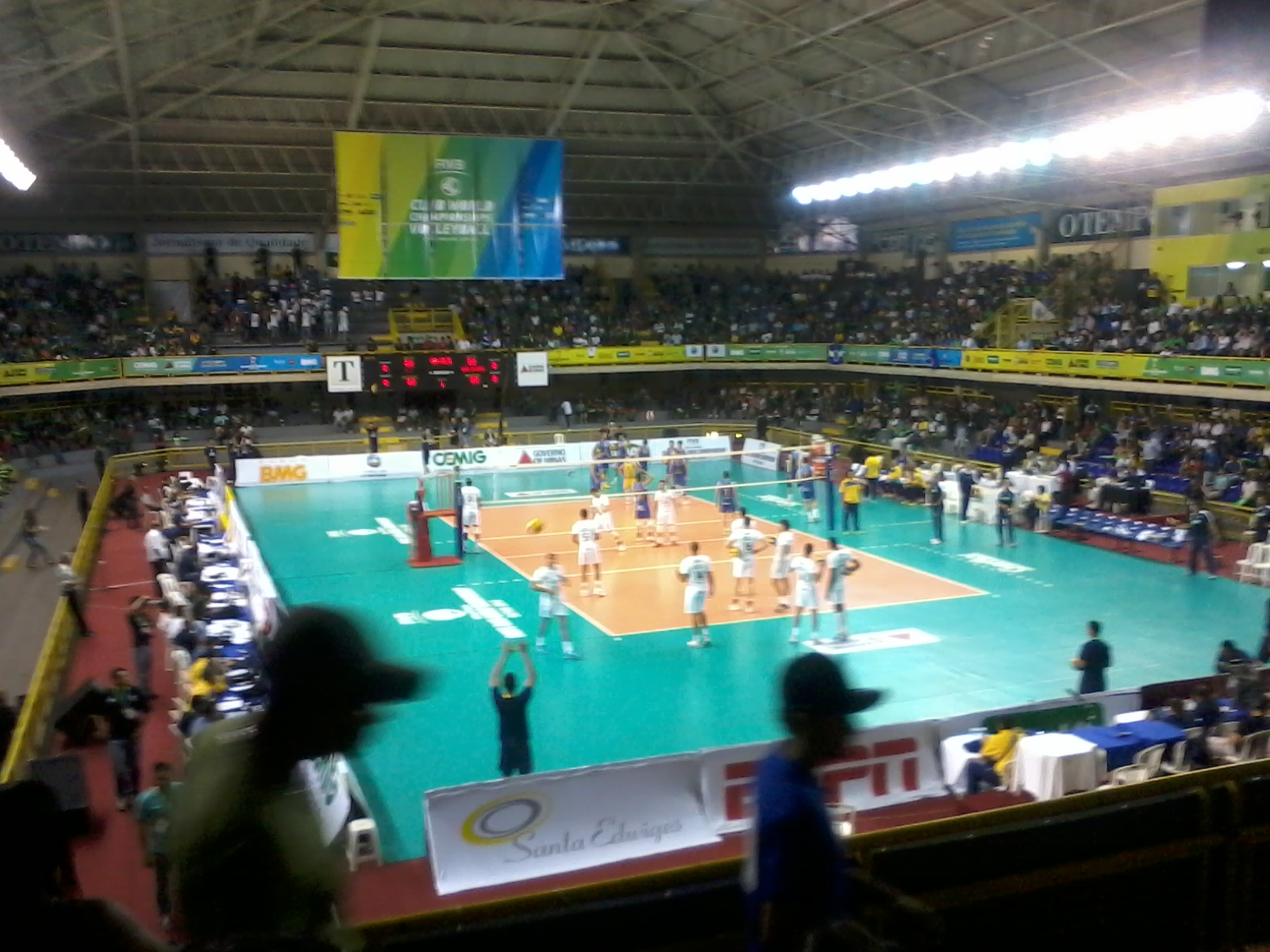

== Pool standing procedure ==
1. Match points
2. Number of matches won
3. Sets ratio
4. Points ratio
5. Result of the last match between the tied teams

Match won 3–0 or 3–1: 3 match points for the winner, 0 match points for the loser
Match won 3–2: 2 match points for the winner, 1 match point for the loser

== Preliminary round ==
- All times are Brasília Time (UTC−03:00).

=== Pool A ===
Pos	Team	Pld	W	L	Pts	SW	SL	SR	SPW	SPL	SPR	Qualification
1	(Argentina) UPCN San Juan	3	3	0	8	9	3	3.000	274	262	1.046	Semifinals
2	(Italy) Trentino Diatec	3	2	1	7	8	4	2.000	283	250	1.132	Semifinals
3	(Japan) Panasonic Panthers	3	1	2	3	4	7	0.571	248	259	0.958	
4	(Iran) Kalleh Mazandaran	3	0	3	0	2	9	0.222	246	280	0.879	

Date	Time		Score		Set 1	Set 2	Set 3	Set 4	Set 5	Total	Report
15 Oct	14:10	Trentino Diatec (Italy)	3–1	(Iran) Kalleh Mazandaran	24–26	25–19	25–19	26–24		100–88	P2 P3
15 Oct	17:10	UPCN San Juan (Argentina)	3–1	(Japan) Panasonic Panthers	20–25	25–23	25–14	25–23		95–85	P2 P3
16 Oct	14:10	Panasonic Panthers (Japan)	3–1	(Iran) Kalleh Mazandaran	25–19	24–26	30–28	25–16		104–89	P2 P3
17 Oct	14:10	UPCN San Juan (Argentina)	3–2	(Italy) Trentino Diatec	22–25	25–23	25–22	16–25	15–13	103–108	P2 P3
18 Oct	14:10	UPCN San Juan (Argentina)	3–0	(Iran) Kalleh Mazandaran	26–24	25–22	25–23			76–69	P2 P3
18 Oct	20:10	Trentino Diatec (Italy)	3–0	(Japan) Panasonic Panthers	25–18	25–19	25–22			75–59	P2 P3

=== Pool B ===
Pos	Team	Pld	W	L	Pts	SW	SL	SR	SPW	SPL	SPR	Qualification
1	(Russia) Lokomotiv Novosibirsk	3	3	0	7	9	4	2.250	293	268	1.093	Semifinals
2	(Brazil) Sada Cruzeiro	3	2	1	7	8	3	2.667	254	216	1.176	Semifinals
3	(Tunisia) Sfaxien	3	1	2	3	5	8	0.625	262	281	0.932	
4	(Dominican Republic) La Romana	3	0	3	1	2	9	0.222	216	260	0.831	

Date	Time		Score		Set 1	Set 2	Set 3	Set 4	Set 5	Total	Report
15 Oct	20:10	Sada Cruzeiro (Brazil)	3–0	(Dominican Republic) La Romana	25–20	25–22	25–16			75–58	P2 P3
16 Oct	17:10	Lokomotiv Novosibirsk (Russia)	3–0	(Dominican Republic) La Romana	25–20	25–23	25–17			75–60	P2 P3
16 Oct	20:10	Sada Cruzeiro (Brazil)	3–0	(Tunisia) Sfaxien	25–16	25–17	25–15			75–48	P2 P3
17 Oct	17:10	Sfaxien (Tunisia)	3–2	(Dominican Republic) La Romana	23–25	22–25	25–23	25–14	15–11	110–98	P2 P3
17 Oct	20:10	Sada Cruzeiro (Brazil)	2–3	(Russia) Lokomotiv Novosibirsk	25–22	21–25	25–22	19–25	14–16	104–110	P2 P3
18 Oct	17:10	Lokomotiv Novosibirsk (Russia)	3–2	(Tunisia) Sfaxien	25–21	20–25	25–19	22–25	16–14	108–104	P2 P3

== Final round ==
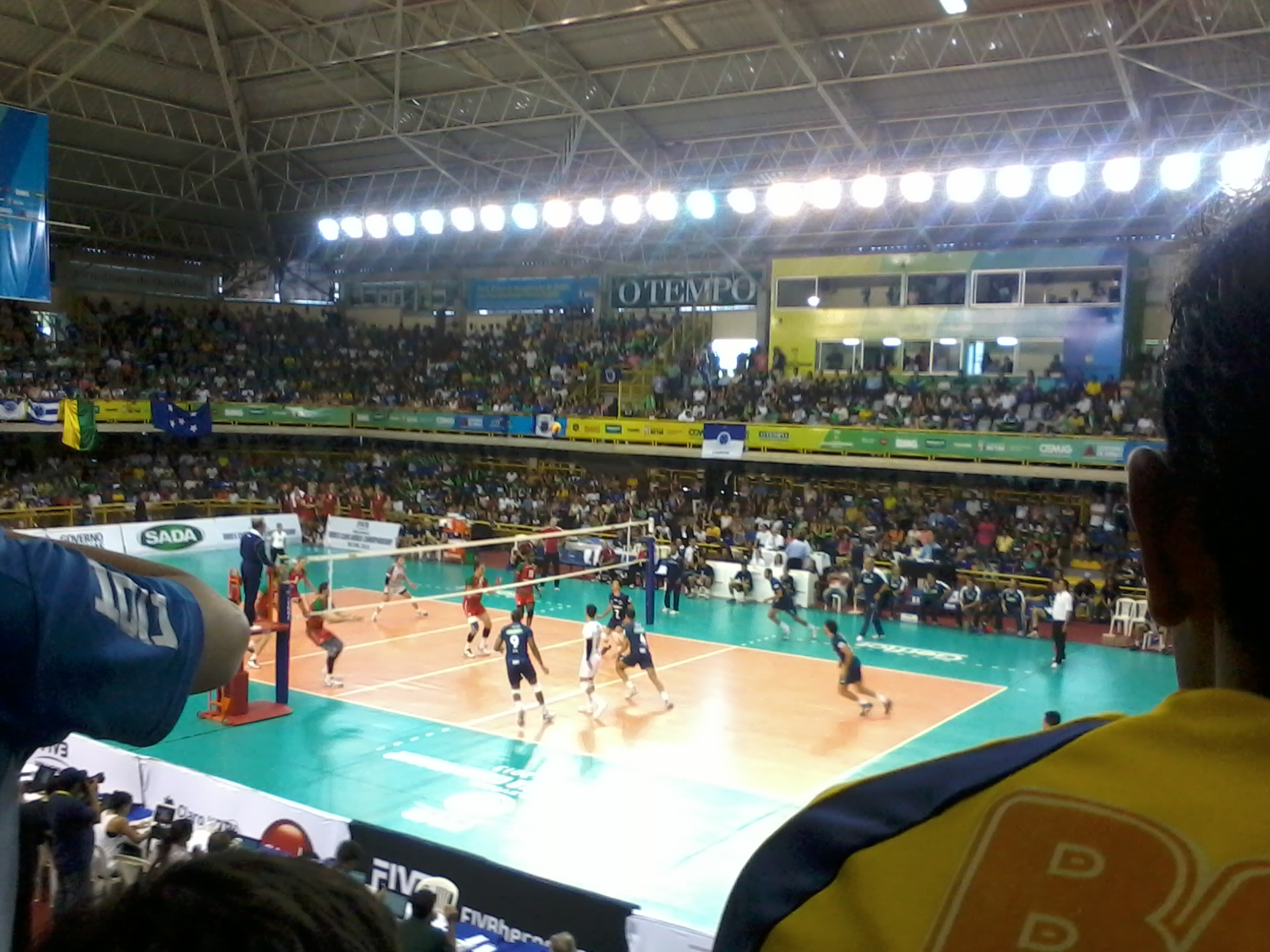
Final match between Sada Cruzeiro and Lokomotiv Novosibirsk.

- Times of 19 October are Brasília Time (UTC−03:00) and times of 20 October are Brasília Summer Time (UTC−02:00).

Semifinals
19 October
(Russia) Novosibirsk	3
(Italy) Trentino	1
19 October
(Argentina) UPCN	0
(Brazil) Sada	3

Final
20 October
(Russia) Novosibirsk	0
(Brazil) Sada	3
3rd place match
20 October
(Italy) Trentino	3
(Argentina) UPCN	1

=== Semifinals ===
Date	Time		Score		Set 1	Set 2	Set 3	Set 4	Set 5	Total	Report
19 Oct	15:40	Lokomotiv Novosibirsk (Russia)	3–1	(Italy) Trentino Diatec	25–27	25–21	26–24	25–23		101–95	P2 P3
19 Oct	18:29	UPCN San Juan (Argentina)	0–3	(Brazil) Sada Cruzeiro	22–25	18–25	20–25			60–75	P2 P3

=== 3rd place match ===
Date	Time		Score		Set 1	Set 2	Set 3	Set 4	Set 5	Total	Report
20 Oct	13:22	Trentino Diatec (Italy)	3–1	(Argentina) UPCN San Juan	25–22	22–25	25–21	25–19		97–87	P2 P3

=== Final ===
Date	Time		Score		Set 1	Set 2	Set 3	Set 4	Set 5	Total	Report
20 Oct	16:10	Lokomotiv Novosibirsk (Russia)	0–3	(Brazil) Sada Cruzeiro	20–25	19–25	20–25			59–75	P2 P3

== Final standing ==
Rank	Team
1st place, gold medalist(s)	(Brazil) Sada Cruzeiro
2nd place, silver medalist(s)	(Russia) Lokomotiv Novosibirsk
3rd place, bronze medalist(s)	(Italy) Trentino Diatec
4	(Argentina) UPCN San Juan
5	(Tunisia) Sfaxien
5	(Japan) Panasonic Panthers
7	(Dominican Republic) La Romana
7	(Iran) Kalleh Mazandaran

2013 Men's Club World Champions

1st title

12–man roster
Raphael Margarido, Douglas Cordeiro, Paulo Victor da Silva, William Arjona (c), Wallace de Souza, Yoandy Leal, Isac Santos, Luis Díaz, Éder Carbonera, Sérgio Nogueira, Filipe Ferraz, Carlos Eduardo Silva
Head coach
Marcelo Méndez

== Awards ==
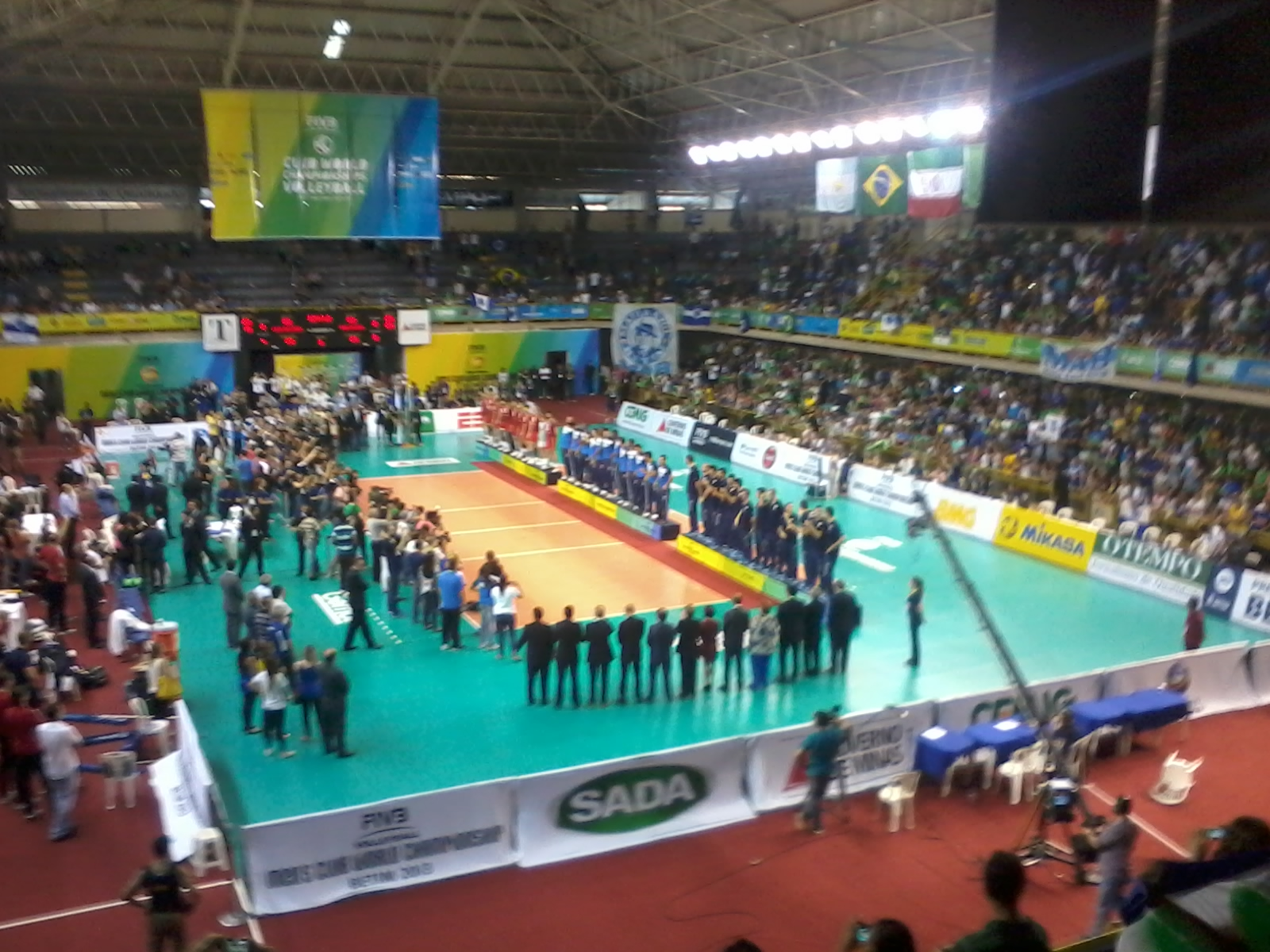
Award ceremony

- Most valuable player
  (Brazil) Wallace de Souza (Sada Cruzeiro)
- Best setter
  (Brazil) William Arjona (Sada Cruzeiro)
- Best Outside Spikers
  (Cuba) Yoandy Leal (Sada Cruzeiro)
  (Slovakia) Lukáš Diviš (Lokomotiv Novosibirsk)
- Best Middle Blockers
  (Italy) Emanuele Birarelli (Trentino Diatec)
  (Italy) Matteo Burgsthaler (Trentino Diatec)
- Best opposite spiker
  (Bulgaria) Tsvetan Sokolov (Trentino Diatec)
- Best libero
  (Brazil) Sérgio Nogueira (Sada Cruzeiro)
