= Roman Martynyuk =

Russian volleyball player (born 1987)

Personal information
- Nationality: Russian
- Born: 13 April 1987 (age 39)
- Height: 1.82 m (6 ft 0 in)
- Weight: 75 kg (165 lb)
- Spike: 315 cm (124 in)
- Block: 305 cm (120 in)

Volleyball information
- Position: Libero
- Current club: VC Lokomotiv Novosibirsk
- Number: 1

Career
Years	Teams
2009–2012; 2012–2013; 2013–2015; 2015–2017; 2017–	Gazprom-Ugra Surgut; Iskra Odintsovo; Fakel; Belogorie; Lokomotiv Novosibirsk

National team
2017–2019	Russia
Honours
Men's volleyball
Representing Russia
Nations League
Gold medal – first place	2019 Chicago
European Championship
Gold medal – first place	2017 Poland
U19 World Championship
Gold medal – first place	2005 Algeria

Roman Aleksandrovich Martynyuk (Russian: Роман Александрович Мартынюк; born 13 April 1987) is a Russian volleyball player. He was a part of the Russia men's national volleyball team. On club level he plays for VC Lokomotiv Novosibirsk.
