= 2017 Memorial of Hubert Jerzy Wagner =

Tournament details
- Host country: Poland
- Dates: 11 – 13 August
- Teams: 4
- Venue: 1 (in 1 host city)

Final positions
- Champions: Poland (7th title)
- Runners-up: France
- Third place: Russia
- Fourth place: Canada

Tournament awards
- MVP: (Russia) Maxim Mikhaylov
- Best Setter: (France) Benjamin Toniutti
- Best OH: (Russia) Dmitry Volkov (Canada) Steven Marshall
- Best MB: (Poland) Bartłomiej Lemański (Russia) Ilyas Kurkaev
- Best OPP: (Poland) Dawid Konarski
- Best Libero: (France) Jenia Grebennikov

The 2017 Memorial of Hubert Jerzy Wagner was a volleyball tournament held at the Tauron Arena in Kraków, Poland from 11 to 13 August 2017. As in the previous edition, four teams participated in the tournament.

Poland won two of three matches and won the competition for the seventh time. The last match of the tournament was the decisive match, where Poland beat Russia in a tie-break. Maxim Mikhaylov from Russia was named the Most Valuable Player.

== Qualification ==
All teams except the host must have received an invitation from the organizers.

Africa (CAVB)	Asia and Oceania (AVC)	Europe (CEV)	North, Central America and Caribbean (NORCECA)	South America (CSV)
		Host nation: Poland; Wild card: France; Russia	Wild card: Canada	

== Venue ==
Kraków, Poland
Tauron Arena
Capacity: 15,328
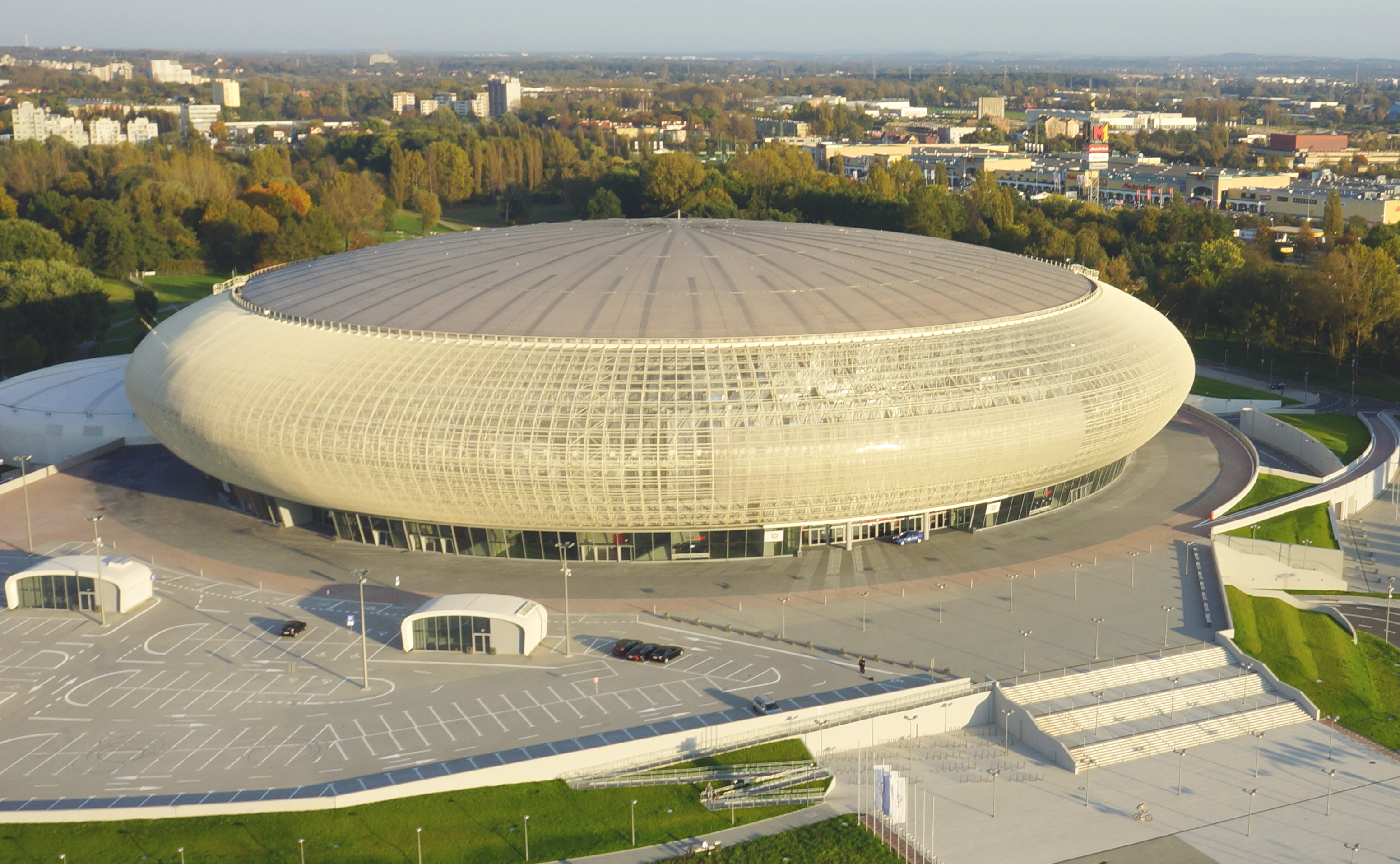

== Results ==
- All times are Central European Summer Time (UTC+02:00).

Pos	Team	Pld	W	L	Pts	SW	SL	SR	SPW	SPL	SPR
1	Poland	3	2	1	6	8	5	1.600	286	293	0.976
2	France	3	2	1	4	6	7	0.857	281	270	1.041
3	Russia	3	1	2	5	7	7	1.000	301	299	1.007
4	Canada	3	1	2	3	4	6	0.667	245	253	0.968

Source: Flashscore

Date	Time		Score		Set 1	Set 2	Set 3	Set 4	Set 5	Total	Report
11 Aug	17:30	Canada	1–3	Russia	23–25	27–29	25–22	17–25		92–101	Report
11 Aug	20:30	Poland	2–3	France	25–22	16–25	20–25	25–22	13–15	99–109	Report
12 Aug	15:00	Poland	3–0	Canada	36–34	25–22	26–24			87–80	Report
12 Aug	18:00	France	3–2	Russia	21–25	25–18	21–25	25–18	15–10	107–96	Report
13 Aug	15:00	Canada	3–0	France	25–22	25–21	25–22			75–65	Report
13 Aug	18:00	Poland	3–2	Russia	16–25	19–25	25–20	25–22	15–12	100–104	Report

== Final standing ==
Rank	Team
1st place, gold medalist(s)	Poland
2nd place, silver medalist(s)	France
3rd place, bronze medalist(s)	Russia
4	Canada

2017 Memorial of Hubert Jerzy Wagner winners

Poland
7th title

Jakub Popiwczak, Maciej Muzaj, Dawid Konarski, Łukasz Kaczmarek, Bartosz Kurek, Artur Szalpuk, Bartłomiej Lemański, Damian Wojtaszek, Fabian Drzyzga, Grzegorz Łomacz, Michał Kubiak (C), Aleksander Śliwka, Jakub Kochanowski, Wiśniewski, Paweł Zatorski, Mateusz Bieniek, Rafał Buszek
Head coach
Ferdinando De Giorgi

== Awards ==
- Most valuable player
  (Russia) Maxim Mikhaylov
- Best setter
  (France) Benjamin Toniutti
- Best outside spikers
  (Russia) Dmitry Volkov
  (Canada) Steven Marshall
- Best middle blockers
  (Poland) Bartłomiej Lemański
  (Russia) Ilyas Kurkaev
- Best opposite spiker
  (Poland) Dawid Konarski
- Best libero
  (France) Jenia Grebennikov
