= Ilyas Kurkaev =

Russian volleyball player (born 1994)

Personal information
- Full name: Ilyas Magomedovich Kurkaev
- Nationality: (Russia) Russian
- Born: 18 January 1994 (age 32); Biysk, Altai Krai, Russia
- Height: 2.08 m (6 ft 10 in)
- Weight: 96 kg (212 lb)
- Spike: 355 cm (140 in)
- Block: 335 cm (132 in)

Volleyball information
- Position: Middle blocker
- Current club: (Russia) Lokomotiv Novosibirsk
- Number: 20

Career
Years	Teams
2013–2015; 2015–2016; 2016–	(Russia) Lokomotiv Novosibirsk (Russia) Yenisei Krasnoyarsk (Russia) Lokomotiv Novosibirsk

National team
2015–	Russia
Honours
Volleyball
Representing ROC
Olympic Games
Silver medal – second place	2020 Tokyo	Team
Representing Russia
FIVB Nations League
Gold medal – first place	2019 Chicago	Team
European Championship
Gold medal – first place	2017 Poland	Team
Summer Universiade
Gold medal – first place	2015 Gwangju	Team
World U21 Championship
Gold medal – first place	2013 Turkey	Under-21

Ilyas Magomedovich Kurkaev (Russian: Ильяс Магомедович Куркаев, IPA: [ɪˈlʲjas kʊrˈka(ɪ̯)ɪf]; born 18 January 1994) is a Russian volleyball player, member of the Russia men's national volleyball team and Russian club Lokomotiv Novosibirsk. He participated at the 2017 European Championship.

== Sporting achievements ==
=== Clubs ===
- National championships
  - 2019/2020 Russian Championship, with Lokomotiv Novosibirsk

=== Youth national team ===
- 2013 FIVB U21 World Championship

=== Universiade ===
- 2015 Summer Universiade

=== Individual awards ===
- 2013: FIVB U21 World Championship – Best Middle Blocker
- 2017: Memorial of Hubert Jerzy Wagner – Best Middle Blocker
