= Lukash Divish =

Slovak–Russian volleyball player

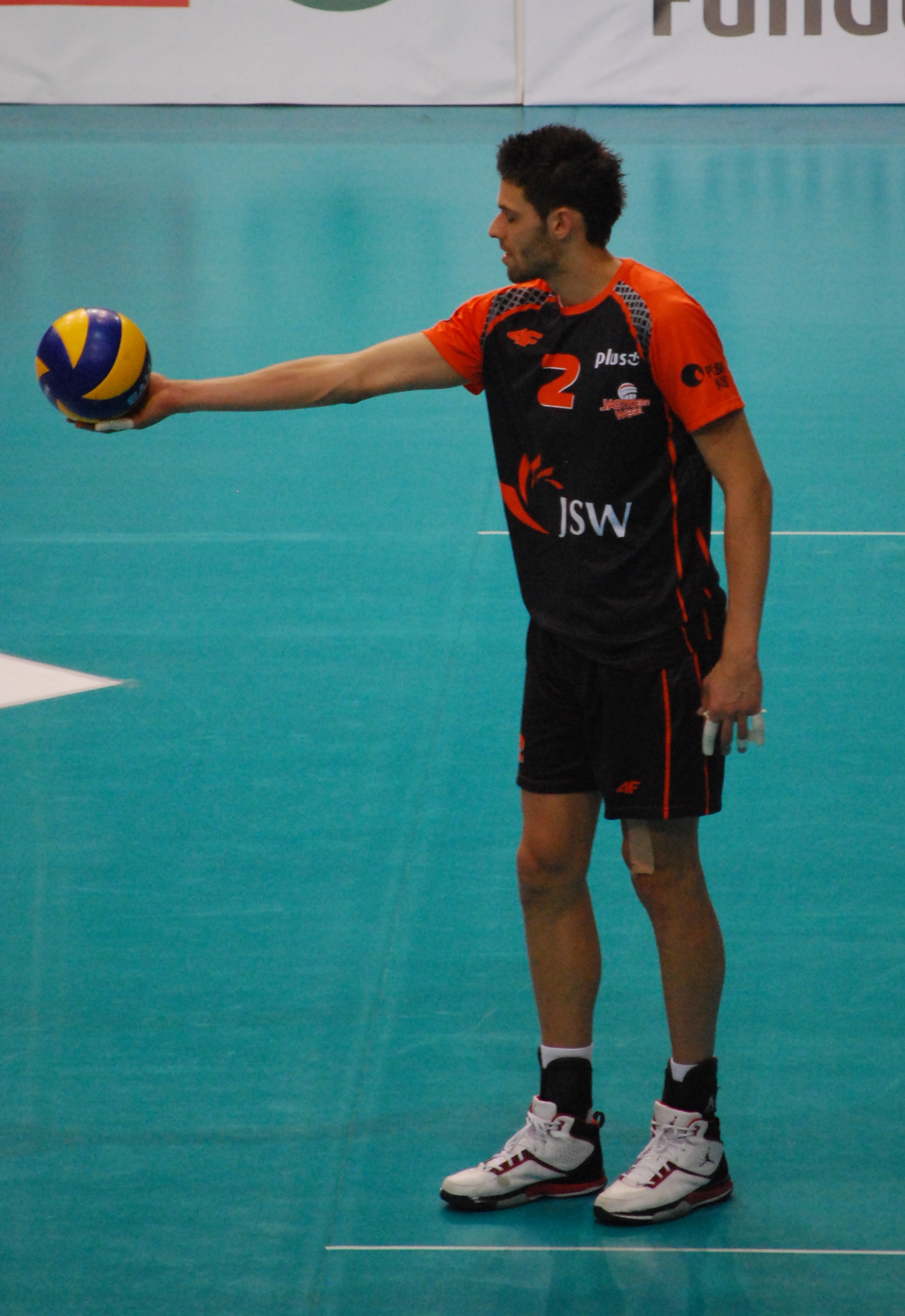

Personal information
- Nationality: (Slovakia) Slovak (Russia) Russian
- Born: Lukáš Diviš; 20 February 1986 (age 40); Žilina, Czechoslovakia
- Height: 2.01 m (6 ft 7 in)
- Weight: 86 kg (190 lb)

Volleyball information
- Position: Outside hitter

Career
Years	Teams
1994–2003; 2003–2006; 2006–2009; 2009–2010; 2010–2011; 2011–2018; 2018–2020; 2020–2021; 2021; 2021–2022; 2022–	(Slovakia) Stavbár Žilina (Czech Republic) Volejbal Brno (Germany) VfB Friedrichshafen (Turkey) Fenerbahçe İstanbul (Poland) Jastrzębski Węgiel (Russia) Lokomotiv Novosibirsk (Russia) Zenit Saint Petersburg (Russia) Dynamo LO (Turkey) Cizre Belediyespor (Turkey) Galatasaray İstanbul (Turkey) Altekma Spor Kulübü

National team
2003–2014; 2016	Slovakia (171); Russia
Honours
Men's volleyball
Representing Slovakia
European League
Gold medal – first place	2011 Slovakia
Bronze medal – third place	2007 Portugal

Lukash Divish (Slovak: Lukáš Diviš; Russian: Лукаш Дивиш; born 20 February 1986) is a Slovak-Russian volleyball player. He is former member of the Slovakia and Russia national volleyball teams.

== Personal life ==
His brother Peter is also a volleyball player.

== Career ==
He became a Russian citizen in 2014. His brother Peter (born 1978) also plays volleyball.

In 2016, Divish was chosen into the team Russia at the World League. He debuted for his team on 24 June, when his team played against France in Łódź.

== Sporting achievements ==
=== Clubs ===
- CEV Champions League
  - 2006/2007 – with VfB Friedrichshafen
  - 2012/2013 – with Lokomotiv Novosibirsk
- National championships
  - 2006/2007 German Cup, with VfB Friedrichshafen
  - 2006/2007 German Championship, with VfB Friedrichshafen
  - 2007/2008 German Cup, with VfB Friedrichshafen
  - 2007/2008 German Championship, with VfB Friedrichshafen
  - 2008/2009 German Championship, with VfB Friedrichshafen
  - 2009/2010 Turkish Championship, with Fenerbahçe İstanbul
  - 2010/2011 Russian Cup, with Lokomotiv Novosibirsk

=== Individual awards ===
- 2007: CEV Champions League – Best Receiver
