= Oreol Camejo =

Cuban volleyball player

Oreol Camejo Durruthy

Personal information
- Full name: Oreol Camejo Durruthy
- Nationality: Cuban / Russian
- Born: 22 July 1986 (age 40)
- Height: 2.07 m (6 ft 9 in)
- Weight: 94 kg (207 lb)

Volleyball information
- Position: Outside hitter
- Current club: (Japan) Hiroshima Thunders
- Number: 15
Honours
Men's volleyball
Representing Cuba
America's Cup
Bronze medal – third place	2005 São Leopoldo	Team
Bronze medal – third place	2007 Manaus	Team
Gold medal – first place	2008 Cuiabá	Team
NORCECA Championship
Bronze medal – third place	2007 Anaheim	Team
Pan American Games
Bronze medal – third place	2007 Rio de Janeiro	Team

Oreol Camejo Durruthy (born 22 July 1986) is a volleyball player from Cuba, who plays as an outside hitter for Japanese club Hiroshima Thunders. He became Best Setter at the first 2008 Olympic Qualification Tournament in Düsseldorf, where Cuba ended up in second place and missed qualification for the 2008 Summer Olympics in Beijing.

== Career ==
Camejo won the bronze medal in the 2005 America's Cup and placed 15th place in the 2006 FIVB World Championship. He won the bronze medal in the 2007 America's Cup. With his national team, he did not qualify for the 2008 Summer Olympics after placing second in the qualifying tournament.

In 2018, Camejo was given Russian citizenship while he was playing for the Russian club Zenit Saint Petersburg.
