= Valentin Golubev =

Russian volleyball player (born 1992)

- Golubev in 2019

Personal information
- Nationality: Russian
- Born: 3 May 1992 (age 34); Zavety Ilyicha, Russia
- Height: 1.90 m (6 ft 3 in)
- Weight: 78 kg (172 lb)
- Spike: 310 cm (122 in)
- Block: 305 cm (120 in)

Volleyball information
- Position: Libero
- Current club: Zenit-Kazan
- Number: 13

National team
Russia
Honours
Volleyball
Representing ROC
Olympic Games
Silver medal – second place	2020 Tokyo	Team
Representing Russia
World Grand Champions Cup
Silver medal – second place	2013 Japan	Team
Nations League
Gold medal – first place	2019 Chicago	Team
European Championship
Gold medal – first place	2017 Poland	Team
Summer Universiade
Gold medal – first place	2013 Kazan	Team
Youth Olympic Games
Gold medal – first place	2010 Singapore	Boys

Valentin Andreyevich Golubev (Russian: Валентин Андреевич Голубев, IPA: [vəlʲɪnʲˈtʲin ˈɡolʊbʲɪf]; born 3 May 1992) is a Russian volleyball player for Zenit-Kazan and the Russian national team.

He participated at the 2017 Men's European Volleyball Championship.

== Sporting achievements ==
=== Clubs ===
==== FIVB Club World Championship ====
- Betim 2019 – with Zenit Kazan
