= 2023 Men's European Volleyball Championship squads =

This article shows all participating team squads at the 2023 Men's European Volleyball Championship, held in Italy, Bulgaria, North Macedonia and Israel from 28 August to 16 September 2023.

== Pool A ==
=== Belgium ===
The following is the Belgian roster in the 2023 European Championship.

- Head coach: (Italy) Emanuele Zanini
- 1 Jolan Cox OP
- 3 Sam Deroo OS
- 4 Stijn D'Hulst S
- 8 Matthijs Verhanneman OS
- 9 Wout D'Heer MB
- 10 Mathijs Desmet OS
- 11 Seppe van Hoyweghen S
- 12 Seppe Rotty OS
- 13 Elias Thys MB
- 14 Jelle Ribbens L
- 20 Robbe Van De Velde OS
- 23 Ferre Reggers OP
- 26 Martin Perin L
- 33 Michiel Fransen MB

=== Estonia ===
The following is the Estonian roster in the 2023 European Championship.

- Head coach: Alar Rikberg
- 1 Henri Treial MB
- 2 Renet Vanker S
- 3 Karli Allik OS
- 6 Martti Juhkami OS
- 7 Renee Teppan OP
- 8 Märt Tammearu OS
- 9 Robert Täht OS
- 10 Silver Maar L
- 11 Oliver Venno OP
- 13 Johan Vahter L
- 17 Timo Tammemaa MB
- 19 Andri Aganits MB
- 22 Markkus Keel S
- 30 Marx Aru MB

=== Germany ===
The following is the German roster in the 2023 European Championship.

- Head coach: (Poland) Michał Winiarski
- 1 Christian Fromm OS
- 2 Johannes Tille S
- 3 Denis Kaliberda OS
- 5 Moritz Reichert OS
- 9 György Grozer OP
- 10 Julian Zenger L
- 11 Lukas Kampa S
- 12 Anton Brehme L
- 13 Ruben Schott OS
- 14 Moritz Karlitzek OS
- 18 Florian Krage MB
- 19 Erik Röhrs OS
- 21 Tobias Krick MB
- 25 Lukas Maase MB

=== Italy ===
The following is the Italian roster in the 2023 European Championship.

- Head coach: (Italy) Ferdinando De Giorgi
- 5 Alessandro Michieletto OS
- 6 Simone Giannelli S
- 7 Fabio Balaso L
- 8 Riccardo Sbertoli S
- 10 Leonardo Scanferla L
- 12 Mattia Bottolo OS
- 14 Gianluca Galassi MB
- 15 Daniele Lavia OS
- 16 Yuri Romanò OP
- 19 Roberto Russo MB
- 20 Tommaso Rinaldi OS
- 23 Alessandro Bovolenta OP
- 28 Giovanni Sanguinetti MB
- 30 Leandro Mosca MB

=== Serbia ===
The following is the Serbian roster in the 2023 European Championship.

- Head coach: (Montenegro) Igor Kolaković
- 2 Uroš Kovačević OS
- 3 Milorad Kapur L
- 7 Petar Krsmanović MB
- 8 Marko Ivović OS
- 10 Miran Kujundžić OS
- 11 Aleksa Batak S
- 12 Pavle Perić OS
- 14 Aleksandar Atanasijević OP
- 15 Nemanja Mašulović MB
- 16 Dražen Luburić OP
- 17 Miloš Krsteski L
- 18 Marko Podraščanin MB
- 21 Vuk Todorović S
- 29 Aleksandar Nedeljković MB

=== Switzerland ===
The following is the Suisse roster in the 2023 European Championship.

- Head coach: (Italy) Mario Motta
- 2 Peer Harksen S
- 4 Bruno Jukic-Sunaric OS
- 5 Luca Ulrich OS
- 6 Reto Giger S
- 8 Quentin Zeller OS
- 12 Linus Birchler MB
- 13 Simon Maag MB
- 15 Julian Weisigk OP
- 17 Alexander Lengweiler MB
- 18 Karim Zerika MB
- 19 Anes Perezic OP
- 20 Lars Migge OS
- 21 Jonas Peter L
- 22 Luca Müller L

== Pool B ==
=== Bulgaria ===
The following is the Bulgarian roster in the 2023 European Championship

- Head coach: Plamen Konstantinov
- 1 Georgi Bratoev S
- 3 Nikolay Kolev MB
- 4 Martin Atanasov OS
- 5 Svetoslav Gotsev MB
- 8 Asparuh Asparuhov OS
- 9 Georgi Seganov S
- 11 Aleks Grozdanov MB
- 13 Teodor Salparov L
- 17 Nikolay Penchev OS
- 19 Tsvetan Sokolov OP
- 20 Denis Karyagin OS
- 21 Simeon Dobrev L
- 23 Aleksandar Nikolov OS
- 24 Iliya Petko MB

=== Croatia ===
The following is the Croatian roster in the 2023 European Championship.

- Head coach: (France) Cédric Énard
- 1 Tsimafei Zhukouski S
- 3 Stipe Perić MB
- 4 Kruno Nikačević MB
- 6 Bernard Bakonji S
- 7 Marko Sedlaček OS
- 8 Sven Jakopec MB
- 9 Tino Hanžić OS
- 10 Filip Šestan OS
- 11 Petar Đirlić OP
- 13 Hrvoje Pervan L
- 14 Marino Marelić OS
- 17 Ivan Mihalj MB
- 19 Ivan Zeljković OS
- 23 Ivan Raič OP

=== Finland ===
The following is the Finnish roster in the 2023 European Championship.

- Head coach: (England) Joel Banks
- 2 Eemi Tervaportti S
- 3 Jiri Hänninen OS
- 5 Alexej Zhbankov MB
- 7 Niko Suihkonen OS
- 8 Voitto Köykkä L
- 10 Luka Marttila OS
- 11 Miika Haapaniemi MB
- 12 Aaro Nikula OP
- 13 Joonas Jokela OP
- 14 Nuutti Niinivaara MB
- 16 Samuli Kaislasalo OP
- 19 Niklas Breilin L
- 21 Fedor Ivanov S
- 23 Antti Sakari Mäkinen OS

=== Slovenia ===
The following is the Slovenian roster in the 2023 European Championship.

- Head coach: (Romania) Gheorghe Crețu
- 2 Alen Pajenk MB
- 3 Uroš Planinšič S
- 4 Jan Kozamernik MB
- 6 Urban Toman L
- 8 Rok Bračko OS
- 9 Dejan Vinčić S
- 10 Sašo Štalekar MB
- 11 Danijel Koncilja MB
- 13 Jani Kovačič L
- 14 Žiga Štern OS
- 16 Gregor Ropret S
- 17 Tine Urnaut OS
- 18 Klemen Čebulj OS
- 19 Rok Možič OS
- 20 Nik Mujanović OP

=== Spain ===
The following is the Spanish roster in the 2023 European Championship.

- Head coach: (Spain) Miguel Rivera
- 1 Jorge Almansa OS
- 3 Víctor Rodríguez Pérez OS
- 6 Borja Ruiz MB
- 7 Jordi Ramón Ferragut OS
- 10 Daniel Ruiz Posadas L
- 12 Jean-Pascal Diedhiou MB
- 13 Andrés Villena OP
- 14 Miguel Ángel Fornés MB
- 18 Francisco Iribarne OS
- 20 Álvaro Gimeno Rubio OP
- 21 César Martín S
- 24 Ignacio Sánchez S
- 27 Alejandro Ribas Brockert MB
- 88 Unai Larrañaga Ledo L

=== Ukraine ===
The following is the Ukrainian roster in the 2023 European Championship.

- Head coach: (Latvia) Uģis Krastiņš
- 1 Tymofii Poluian OS
- 3 Bohdan Mazenko MB
- 5 Oleh Plotnytskyi OS
- 7 Yurii Synytsia S
- 9 Volodymyr Ostapenko MB
- 10 Yurii Semeniuk MB
- 11 Dmytro Kanaiev L
- 12 Serhii Yevstratov S
- 13 Vasyl Tupchii OS
- 14 Illia Kovalov OS
- 16 Vitalii Kucher OP
- 17 Oleksandr Boiko L
- 21 Yevhenii Kisiliuk OS
- 27 Vladyslav Schurov MB

== Pool C ==
=== Czech Republic ===
The following is the Czech roster in the 2023 European Championship

- Head coach: (Czech Republic) Jiří Novák
- 2 Jan Hadrava OP
- 3 Daniel Pfeffer L
- 4 Donovan Džavoronok OS
- 5 Adam Zajíček MB
- 6 Milan Moník L
- 8 Lukáš Trojanowicz MB
- 11 Lukáš Vašina OS
- 12 Martin Licek S
- 13 Jan Galabov OS
- 16 Jiří Srb S
- 17 Marek Šotola OP
- 18 Jakub Janouch S
- 20 Petr Špulák MB
- 25 Josef Polák MB

=== Denmark ===
The following is the Danish roster in the 2023 European Championship.

- Head coach: Kristian Flojstrup Knudsen
- 1 Nikolaj Hjorth L
- 5 Joachim Hesselholt MB
- 6 Rasmus Mikelsons MB
- 7 Alfred Gramkow Østergaard L
- 8 Axel Jacobsen S
- 9 Rasmus Breuning Nielsen OP
- 10 Tobias Kjær OS
- 11 Mikkel Hoff S
- 13 Simon Øster Ellegaard Andersen MB
- 14 Ulrik Bo Dahl OP
- 18 Simon Tabermann Uhrenholt MB
- 19 Axel Juul Larsen OS
- 21 Mads Kyed Jensen OP
- 22 Oskar Kjerstein Madsen OS

=== Montenegro ===
The following is the Montenegrin roster in the 2023 European Championship.

- Head coach: Ivan Joksimović
- 1 Aleksandar Minić OP
- 3 Luka Babić OP
- 4 Ivan Zvicer OS
- 6 Vojin Ćaćić OS
- 8 Marko Joksimović S
- 9 Marko Bojić OS
- 10 Milan Rovčanin L
- 12 Jovan Delić OP
- 13 Blažo Milić MB
- 14 Bojan Strugar OP
- 15 Djordje Jovović OP
- 17 Nikola Đurović MB
- 22 Danilo Dubak S
- 23 Rastko Milenković S

=== Netherlands ===
The following is the Dutch roster in the 2023 European Championship.

- Head coach: (Italy) Roberto Piazza
- 1 Siebe Korenblek MB
- 2 Wessel Keemink S
- 3 Maarten van Garderen OS
- 4 Thijs ter Horst OS
- 6 Sil Meijs S
- 7 Gijs Jorna OS
- 8 Fabian Plak MB
- 11 Jeffrey Klok L
- 12 Bennie Tuinstra OS
- 14 Nimir Abdel-Aziz OP
- 16 Wouter ter Maat OP
- 17 Michaël Parkinson MB
- 18 Robbert Andringa L
- 22 Twan Wiltenburg MB

=== North Macedonia ===
The following is the North Macedonia roster in the 2023 European Championship.

- Head coach: Joško Milenkoski
- 1 Darko Angelovski L
- 2 Gjorgi Gjorgiev S
- 3 Toshe Efremov OS
- 4 Nikola Gjorgiev OP
- 5 Vlado Milev OS
- 7 Slave Nakov MB
- 8 Aleksandar Ljaftov OS
- 9 Filip Lepidovski MB
- 11 Filip Despotovski S
- 15 Filip Madjunkov MB
- 16 Stojan Iliev OS
- 17 Luka Kostikj OS
- 19 Kostadin Richliev L
- 20 Filip Savovski MB

=== Poland ===
The following is the Polish roster in the 2023 European Championship.

- Head coach: (Serbia) Nikola Grbić
- 3 Jakub Popiwczak L
- 5 Łukasz Kaczmarek OP
- 6 Bartosz Kurek OS
- 7 Karol Kłos MB
- 9 Wilfredo León OS
- 10 Bartosz Bednorz OS
- 11 Aleksander Śliwka OS
- 12 Grzegorz Łomacz S
- 15 Jakub Kochanowski MB
- 16 Kamil Semeniuk OS
- 17 Paweł Zatorski L
- 19 Marcin Janusz S
- 21 Tomasz Fornal OS
- 99 Norbert Huber MB

== Pool D ==
=== France ===
The following is the French roster in the 2023 European Championship

- Head coach: (Italy) Andrea Giani
- 1 Barthélémy Chinenyeze MB
- 2 Jenia Grebennikov L
- 4 Jean Patry OP
- 6 Benjamin Toniutti S
- 7 Kévin Tillie OS
- 9 Earvin N'Gapeth OS
- 11 Antoine Brizard S
- 12 Stéphen Boyer OP
- 14 Nicolas Le Goff MB
- 16 Daryl Bultor MB
- 17 Trévor Clévenot OS
- 19 Yacine Louati OS
- 23 Timothée Carle OS
- 25 Quentin Jouffroy MB

=== Greece ===
The following is the Greek roster in the 2023 European Championship.

- Head coach: (Italy) Dante Boninfante
- 1 Aristeidis Chandrinos L
- 7 Giorgos Petreas MB
- 8 Georgios Tzioumakas OP
- 9 Menelaos Kokkinakis L
- 10 Rafail Koumentakis OS
- 11 Dimitrios Mouchlias OP
- 12 Theodoros Voulkidis MB
- 14 Markos Galiotos S
- 15 Alexandros Raptis OS
- 18 Apostolos Petsias S
- 21 Mitar Tzourits MB
- 22 Dimosthenis Linardos MB
- 23 Spyridon Chakas OS
- 77 Athanasios Protopsaltis OS

=== Israel ===
The following is the Israeli roster in the 2023 European Championship.

- Head coach: Itamar Stein
- 2 Ariel Katzenelson S
- 3 Tamir Hershko OS
- 4 Shay Liberman OS
- 5 Adir Ben Shloosh L
- 7 Iliya Goldrin OS
- 9 Guy Genis MB
- 10 Noam Ariel S
- 11 Nikita Maron MB
- 12 Ofek Hazan MB
- 13 Omri Roitman L
- 16 Ido David OS
- 17 Ilay Haver OS
- 18 Genadi Sokolov MB
- 19 Mark Rura OS

=== Portugal ===
The following is the Portuguese roster in the 2023 European Championship.

- Head coach: João José
- 1 Miguel Sinfronio MB
- 2 José Belo MB
- 3 Gonçalo Sousa L
- 4 Filip Cveticanin MB
- 5 André Marques OS
- 6 Alexandre Ferreira OS
- 7 Ivo Casas L
- 8 Tiago Violas S
- 12 Lourenço Martins OS
- 13 José Pedro Pinto OP
- 15 Miguel Tavares S
- 16 Bruno Cunha OP
- 17 José Andrade MB
- 18 André Pereira OS

=== Romania ===
The following is the Romanian roster in the 2023 European Championship.

- Head coach: Sergiu Stancu
- 1 Bela Bartha MB
- 2 Mircea Paul Peta OS
- 3 Filip Constantin S
- 4 Sergio Diaconescu L
- 5 Daniel Chiţigoi OS
- 6 Claudiu Dumitru S
- 7 Rareș Bălean OS
- 9 Adrian Aciobăniței OS
- 11 Carol-Gabriel Kosinski L
- 12 Marian Iulian Bala OS
- 13 Alexandru Rață OP
- 15 Andrei Butnaru MB
- 19 Robert Călin MB
- 22 Ștefan Lupu MB

=== Turkey ===
The following is the Turkish roster in the 2023 European Championship.

- Head coach: (Italy) Alberto Giuliani
- 1 Kaan Gürbüz OP
- 6 Arda Bostan S
- 7 Bedirhan Bülbül MB
- 8 Burutay Subaşı OP
- 9 Mirza Lagumdzija OP
- 10 Arslan Ekşi S
- 11 Yiğit Gülmezoğlu OS
- 12 Adis Lagumdzija OP
- 14 Faik Samed Güneş MB
- 15 Mert Matić MB
- 19 Berkay Bayraktar L
- 20 Efe Bayram OS
- 53 Volkan Döne L
- 77 Vahit Emre Savaş MB

== See also ==
- 2023 Women's European Volleyball Championship squads
