= 2015–16 PGE Skra Bełchatów season =

PGE Skra Bełchatów
2015–16 season
- Chairman: Konrad Piechocki
- Manager: Miguel Falasca (2015–Mar 2016); Philippe Blain (Mar 2016–2017)

PGE Skra Bełchatów 2015–2016 season is the 2015/2016 volleyball season for Polish professional volleyball club PGE Skra Bełchatów.

The club competes in:

- Polish Championship
- Polish Cup
- CEV Champions League

PGE Skra got eliminated from 2015–16 CEV Champions League in playoffs 6 by Zenit Kazan (first match 3-2, second 0-3). After failure head coach Miguel Angel Falasca was fired during clubs meeting. The decision was announced on March 28, 2016. Management of Skra announced also that duties of head coach to the end of season 2015/16 were taken by Falasca's assistant Italian Fabio Storti, but next day on March 29, 2016 contract signed new head coach - Philippe Blain.

== Team roster ==
Head coach:	Miguel Angel Falasca (2015–Mar 2016) / Philippe Blain (Mar 2016–2016)
Assistant:	Fabio Storti

No.	Name	Date of birth	Position
1	(Serbia) Srećko Lisinac	May 17, 1992	middle blocker
2	(Poland) Mariusz Wlazły (C)	August 4, 1983	opposite
4	(Poland) Mariusz Marcyniak	March 5, 1992	middle blocker
6	(Poland) Karol Kłos	August 8, 1989	middle blocker
7	(Argentina) Facundo Conte	August 25, 1989	outside hitter
8	(Poland) Andrzej Wrona	December 27, 1988	middle blocker
9	(Poland) Marcin Janusz	July 31, 1994	setter
10	(Argentina) Nicolás Uriarte	March 21, 1990	setter
11	(Serbia) Mihajlo Stanković	June 5, 1993	outside hitter
13	(Poland) Michał Winiarski	September 28, 1983	outside hitter
14	(Poland) Marcel Gromadowski	December 19, 1985	opposite
16	(Poland) Kacper Piechocki	February 17, 1995	libero
17	(Poland) Robert Milczarek	November 28, 1983	libero
18	(France) (Poland) Nicolas Marechal	March 4, 1987	outside hitter
19	(Spain) Israel Rodríguez	August 27, 1981	outside hitter

== Squad changes for the 2014–2015 season ==
In:

No.	Player	Position	From
4	(Poland) Mariusz Marcyniak	middle blocker	Effector Kielce
9	(Poland) Marcin Janusz	setter	Effector Kielce
11	(Serbia) Mihajlo Stanković	outside hitter	OK Vojvodina Novi Sad
14	(Poland) Marcel Gromadowski	opposite	MKS Cuprum Lubin
17	(Poland) Robert Milczarek	libero/receiver	MKS Banimex Będzin
19	(Spain) Israel Rodríguez	outside hitter	Ziraat Bankası Ankara
	(France) Philippe Blain (29 March 2016)	head coach

Out:

No.	Player	Position	To
9	(Poland) Maciej Muzaj	opposite	Jastrzębski Węgiel
12	(Poland) Wojciech Włodarczyk	outside hitter	MKS Cuprum Lubin
15	(Serbia) Aleksa Brđović	setter	Gazprom-Ugra Surgut
17	(Germany) Ferdinand Tille	libero	TSV Herrsching
	(Spain) Miguel Angel Falasca (28 March 2016)	head coach	Czech Republic men's national volleyball team

== Most Valuable Players ==
=== PlusLiga ===
No.	Opponent	Date	Player
1.	Effector Kielce	30.10.2015	(Poland) Mariusz Wlazły
2.	MKS Będzin	07.11.2015	(Poland) Mariusz Wlazły
3.	Lotos Trefl Gdańsk	14.11.2015	(Poland) Mariusz Wlazły
4.	AZS Częstochowa	21.11.2015	(Spain) Israel Rodríguez
5.	Jastrzębski Węgiel	25.11.2015	(Argentina) Facundo Conte
6.	Łuczniczka Bydgoszcz	27.11.2015	(Poland) Mariusz Wlazły
7.	Cuprum Lubin	09.12.2015	(Poland) Marcel Gromadowski
8.	AZS Politechnika Warszawska	12.12.2015	(Argentina) Facundo Conte
9.	Cerrad Czarni Radom	19.12.2015	(Argentina) Facundo Conte
10.	BBTS Bielsko-Biała	16.01.2016	(Argentina) Nicolás Uriarte
11.	Effector Kielce	23.01.2016	(France) Nicolas Marechal
12.	MKS Będzin	29.01.2016	(Argentina) Nicolás Uriarte
13.	Asseco Resovia Rzeszów	10.02.2016	(Poland) Mariusz Wlazły
14.	AZS Częstochowa	20.02.2016	(Poland) Karol Kłos
15.	Jastrzębski Węgiel	24.02.2016	(Argentina) Facundo Conte
16.	ZAKSA Kędzierzyn-Koźle	06.03.2016	(Serbia) Srećko Lisinac
17.	Cuprum Lubin	12.03.2016	(Serbia) Srećko Lisinac
18.	AZS Politechnika Warszawska	20.03.2016	(Argentina) Nicolas Uriarte
19.	Cerrad Czarni Radom	02.04.2016	(Poland) Mariusz Wlazły
20.	Indykpol AZS Olsztyn	06.04.2016	(France) Nicolas Marechal
21.	BBTS Bielsko-Biała	09.04.2016	(France) Nicolas Marechal
22.	Lotos Trefl Gdańsk	21.04.2016	(Argentina) Nicolas Uriarte
22.	Lotos Trefl Gdańsk	22.04.2016	(Poland) Mariusz Wlazły
23.	Lotos Trefl Gdańsk	26.04.2016	(Argentina) Nicolas Uriarte

==== General classification ====
No.	Player	MVP
1.	(Poland) Mariusz Wlazły	7
2.	(Argentina) Nicolás Uriarte	5
3.	(Argentina) Facundo Conte	4
4.	(France) Nicolas Marechal	3
5.	(Serbia) Srećko Lisinac	2
6.	(Spain) Israel Rodríguez	1
	(Poland) Marcel Gromadowski	1
	(Poland) Karol Kłos	1

== Results, schedules and standings ==
=== 2015–16 PlusLiga ===
==== Regular season ====
October 30, 2015; 18:00	Effector Kielce	1–3	PGE Skra Bełchatów	Legionów Hall, Kielce; Attendance: 4,200; Referees: BURKIEWICZ Paweł - KAWIAK Bogusław
October 30, 2015; 18:00	(22–25, 16–25, 25–22, 18–25) MVP: Mariusz Wlazły			Legionów Hall, Kielce; Attendance: 4,200; Referees: BURKIEWICZ Paweł - KAWIAK Bogusław

November 7, 2015; 15:00	PGE Skra Bełchatów	3–0	MKS Będzin	Energia Hall, Bełchatów; Attendance: 2,200; Referees: NIEDBAŁ Anna - MICHLIC Agnieszka
November 7, 2015; 15:00	(25–18, 25–23, 25–15) MVP: Mariusz Wlazły			Energia Hall, Bełchatów; Attendance: 2,200; Referees: NIEDBAŁ Anna - MICHLIC Agnieszka

November 11, 2015; 14:45	PGE Skra Bełchatów	1–3	Asseco Resovia Rzeszów	Energia Hall, Bełchatów; Attendance: 2,700; Referees: LAGIERSKI Marek - MAROSZEK Wojciech
November 11, 2015; 14:45	(21–25, 25–16, 20–25, 22–25) MVP: Bartosz Kurek			Energia Hall, Bełchatów; Attendance: 2,700; Referees: LAGIERSKI Marek - MAROSZEK Wojciech

November 14, 2015; 14:45	PGE Skra Bełchatów	3–0	Lotos Trefl Gdańsk	Energia Hall, Bełchatów; Attendance: 2,600; Referees: DUDEK Piotr - BURKIEWICZ Paweł
November 14, 2015; 14:45	(25–17, 25–20, 25–19) MVP: Mariusz Wlazły			Energia Hall, Bełchatów; Attendance: 2,600; Referees: DUDEK Piotr - BURKIEWICZ Paweł

November 21, 2015; 15:00	PGE Skra Bełchatów	3–0	AZS Częstochowa	Energia Hall, Bełchatów; Attendance: 2,600; Referees: BROŃSKI Jacek - WOLSKI Zbigniew
November 21, 2015; 15:00	(25–17, 25–21, 25–11) MVP: Israel Rodríguez			Energia Hall, Bełchatów; Attendance: 2,600; Referees: BROŃSKI Jacek - WOLSKI Zbigniew

November 25, 2015; 18:00	PGE Skra Bełchatów	3–1	Jastrzębski Węgiel	Energia Hall, Bełchatów; Attendance: 2,300; Referees: SKOWROŃSKI Piotr - Heyducki Marek
November 25, 2015; 18:00	(22–25, 25–19, 25–21, 25–16) MVP: Facundo Conte			Energia Hall, Bełchatów; Attendance: 2,300; Referees: SKOWROŃSKI Piotr - Heyducki Marek

November 28, 2015; 18:00	Łuczniczka Bydgoszcz	0–3	PGE Skra Bełchatów	Łuczniczka, Bydgoszcz; Attendance: 5,312; Referees: NIEMCZURA Waldemar - KRÓL Piotr
November 28, 2015; 18:00	(26–28, 21–25, 22–25) MVP: Mariusz Wlazły			Łuczniczka, Bydgoszcz; Attendance: 5,312; Referees: NIEMCZURA Waldemar - KRÓL Piotr

December 5, 2015; 20:00	PGE Skra Bełchatów	2–3	ZAKSA Kędzierzyn-Koźle	Energia Hall, Bełchatów; Attendance: 2,700; Referees: DUDEK Piotr - BURKIEWICZ Paweł
December 5, 2015; 20:00	(17–25, 25–21, 20–25, 25–19, 10–15) MVP: Sam Deroo			Energia Hall, Bełchatów; Attendance: 2,700; Referees: DUDEK Piotr - BURKIEWICZ Paweł

December 9, 2015; 18:00	MKS Cuprum Lubin	2–3	PGE Skra Bełchatów	HWS RCS, Lubin; Attendance: 3,700; Referees: KRÓL Piotr - NIEMCZURA Waldemar
December 9, 2015; 18:00	(21–25, 25–18, 19–25, 25–15, 10–15) MVP: Marcel Gromadowski			HWS RCS, Lubin; Attendance: 3,700; Referees: KRÓL Piotr - NIEMCZURA Waldemar

December 12, 2015; 15:00	PGE Skra Bełchatów	3–0	AZS Politechnika Warszawska	Energia Hall, Bełchatów; Attendance: 2,500; Referees: KOLENDOWSKI Maciej - FLIS Tomasz
December 12, 2015; 15:00	(27–25, 25–18, 25–23) MVP: Facundo Conte			Energia Hall, Bełchatów; Attendance: 2,500; Referees: KOLENDOWSKI Maciej - FLIS Tomasz

December 19, 2015; 20:00	Cerrad Czarni Radom	1–3	PGE Skra Bełchatów	Hala MOSiR, Radom; Attendance: 1,500; Referees: MICHLIC Agnieszka - BROŃSKI Jacek
December 19, 2015; 20:00	(21–25, 21–25, 26–24, 23–25) MVP: Facundo Conte			Hala MOSiR, Radom; Attendance: 1,500; Referees: MICHLIC Agnieszka - BROŃSKI Jacek

January 13, 2016; 20:30	PGE Skra Bełchatów	1–3	Indykpol AZS Olsztyn	Energia Hall, Bełchatów; Attendance: 2,500; Referees: JANIK Tomasz - HERBIK Marcin
January 13, 2016; 20:30	(22–25, 25–20, 22–25, 27–29) MVP: Paweł Woicki			Energia Hall, Bełchatów; Attendance: 2,500; Referees: JANIK Tomasz - HERBIK Marcin

January 16, 2016; 17:00	BBTS Bielsko-Biała	1–3	PGE Skra Bełchatów	Dębowiec Sports Arena, Bielsko-Biała; Attendance: 3,000; Referees: MAKOWSKI Jarosław - WOLSKI Zbigniew
January 16, 2016; 17:00	(19–25, 22–25, 25–22, 21–25) MVP: Nicolás Uriarte			Dębowiec Sports Arena, Bielsko-Biała; Attendance: 3,000; Referees: MAKOWSKI Jarosław - WOLSKI Zbigniew

January 23, 2016; 15:00	PGE Skra Bełchatów	3–2	Effector Kielce	Energia Hall, Bełchatów; Attendance: 2,600; Referees: SOKÓŁ Katarzyna - IGNATOWICZ Paweł
January 23, 2016; 15:00	(25–16, 25–22, 32–34, 19–25, 15–9) MVP: Nicolas Marechal			Energia Hall, Bełchatów; Attendance: 2,600; Referees: SOKÓŁ Katarzyna - IGNATOWICZ Paweł

January 29, 2016; 20:30	MKS Będzin	0–3	PGE Skra Bełchatów	Hala Widowiskowo-Sportowa MOSiR, Sosnowiec; Attendance: 1,400; Referees: HEYDUCKI Marek - MICHLIC Agnieszka
January 29, 2016; 20:30	(23–25, 19–25, 16–25) MVP: Nicolás Uriarte			Hala Widowiskowo-Sportowa MOSiR, Sosnowiec; Attendance: 1,400; Referees: HEYDUCKI Marek - MICHLIC Agnieszka

February 10, 2016; 18:00	Asseco Resovia Rzeszów	2–3	PGE Skra Bełchatów	Podpromie Hall, Rzeszów; Attendance: 4,300; Referees: MAROSZEK Wojciech - KUCHNA Andrzej
February 10, 2016; 18:00	(22–25, 29–31, 26–24, 25–23, 13–15) MVP: Mariusz Wlazły			Podpromie Hall, Rzeszów; Attendance: 4,300; Referees: MAROSZEK Wojciech - KUCHNA Andrzej

February 13, 2016; 14:45	Lotos Trefl Gdańsk	3–0	PGE Skra Bełchatów	Ergo Arena, Gdańsk; Attendance: 7,600; Referees: KOBIENIA Waldemar - IGNATOWICZ Paweł
February 13, 2016; 14:45	(25–17, 25–20, 25–16) MVP: Wojciech Grzyb			Ergo Arena, Gdańsk; Attendance: 7,600; Referees: KOBIENIA Waldemar - IGNATOWICZ Paweł

February 20, 2016; 17:00	AZS Częstochowa	2–3	PGE Skra Bełchatów	Hala Sportowa 'Częstochowa', Częstochowa; Attendance: 3,000; Referees: NIEDBAŁ Anna - SOKÓŁ Katarzyna
February 20, 2016; 17:00	(16–25, 27–25, 20–25, 26–24, 9–15) MVP: Karol Kłos			Hala Sportowa 'Częstochowa', Częstochowa; Attendance: 3,000; Referees: NIEDBAŁ Anna - SOKÓŁ Katarzyna

February 24, 2016; 18:00	Jastrzębski Węgiel	2–3	PGE Skra Bełchatów	Hala Sportowa, Jastrzębie-Zdrój; Attendance: 2,850; Referees: GADZINA Mariusz - DUDEK Piotr
February 24, 2016; 18:00	(23–25, 27–25, 25–27, 25–20, 10–15) MVP: Facundo Conte			Hala Sportowa, Jastrzębie-Zdrój; Attendance: 2,850; Referees: GADZINA Mariusz - DUDEK Piotr

February 27, 2016; 15:00	PGE Skra Bełchatów	0–3	Łuczniczka Bydgoszcz	Energia Hall, Bełchatów; Attendance: 2,700; Referees: SOKÓŁ Katarzyna - WOLSKI Zbigniew
February 27, 2016; 15:00	(23–25, 21–25, 22–25) MVP: Jakub Jarosz			Energia Hall, Bełchatów; Attendance: 2,700; Referees: SOKÓŁ Katarzyna - WOLSKI Zbigniew

March 6, 2016; 14:45	ZAKSA Kędzierzyn-Koźle	2–3	PGE Skra Bełchatów	Azoty Hall, Kędzierzyn-Koźle; Attendance: 3,375; Referees: MAROSZEK Wojciech - LAGIERSKI Marek
March 6, 2016; 14:45	(25–23, 19–25, 25–21, 23–25, 12–15) MVP: Srećko Lisinac			Azoty Hall, Kędzierzyn-Koźle; Attendance: 3,375; Referees: MAROSZEK Wojciech - LAGIERSKI Marek

March 12, 2016; 15:00	PGE Skra Bełchatów	3–1	Cuprum Lubin	Energia Hall, Bełchatów; Attendance: 2,700; Referees: BUDZIK Marek - DUDEK Piotr
March 12, 2016; 15:00	(25–19, 26–28, 25–19, 25–21) MVP: Srećko Lisinac			Energia Hall, Bełchatów; Attendance: 2,700; Referees: BUDZIK Marek - DUDEK Piotr

March 20, 2016; 14:45	AZS Politechnika Warszawska	1–3	PGE Skra Bełchatów	Torwar Hall, Warsaw; Attendance: 5,800; Referees: IGNATOWICZ Paweł - KOBIENIA Waldemar
March 20, 2016; 14:45	(21–25, 24–26, 25–17, 23–25) MVP: Nicolas Uriarte			Torwar Hall, Warsaw; Attendance: 5,800; Referees: IGNATOWICZ Paweł - KOBIENIA Waldemar

April 2, 2016; 18:00	PGE Skra Bełchatów	3–0	Cerrad Czarni Radom	Energia Hall, Bełchatów; Attendance: 2,700; Referees: MAROSZEK Wojciech - KUCHNA Wojciech
April 2, 2016; 18:00	(25–21, 25–14, 25–20)			Energia Hall, Bełchatów; Attendance: 2,700; Referees: MAROSZEK Wojciech - KUCHNA Wojciech

April 6, 2016; 18:00	Indykpol AZS Olsztyn	0–3	PGE Skra Bełchatów	Urania Hall, Olsztyn; Attendance: 1,900; Referees: HEYDUCKI Marek - MICHLIC Agnieszka
April 6, 2016; 18:00	(19–25, 27–29, 23–25) MVP: Nicolas Marechal			Urania Hall, Olsztyn; Attendance: 1,900; Referees: HEYDUCKI Marek - MICHLIC Agnieszka

April 9, 2016; 14:45	PGE Skra Bełchatów	3–1	BBTS Bielsko-Biała	Energia Hall, Bełchatów; Attendance: 2,700; Referees: MICHLIC Agnieszka - TWARDOWSKI Maciej
April 9, 2016; 14:45	(23–25, 25–19, 25–22, 27–25) MVP: Nicolas Marechal			Energia Hall, Bełchatów; Attendance: 2,700; Referees: MICHLIC Agnieszka - TWARDOWSKI Maciej

==== Final round (for bronze medal) ====
21 April 2016; 18:00	PGE Skra Bełchatów	3–0	Lotos Trefl Gdańsk	Energia Hall, Bełchatów; Attendance: 2,650; Referees: Dudek Piotr - Gadzina Mariusz
21 April 2016; 18:00	(26–24, 25–15, 25–21) MVP: Nicolas Uriarte			Energia Hall, Bełchatów; Attendance: 2,650; Referees: Dudek Piotr - Gadzina Mariusz

22 April 2016; 18:00	PGE Skra Bełchatów	3–0	Lotos Trefl Gdańsk	Energia Hall, Bełchatów; Attendance: 2,700; Referees: Król Piotr - Budzik Marek
22 April 2016; 18:00	(25–13, 25–10, 25–21) MVP: Mariusz Wlazły			Energia Hall, Bełchatów; Attendance: 2,700; Referees: Król Piotr - Budzik Marek

26 April 2016; 18:00	Lotos Trefl Gdańsk	0–3	PGE Skra Bełchatów	Ergo Arena, Gdańsk; Attendance: 5,119; Referees: Broński Jacek - Wolski Zbigniew
26 April 2016; 18:00	(11–25, 19–25, 17–25) MVP: Nicolas Uriarte			Ergo Arena, Gdańsk; Attendance: 5,119; Referees: Broński Jacek - Wolski Zbigniew

=== 2015–16 Polish Cup ===
February 5, 2016; 21:00	PGE Skra Bełchatów	3–0	SMS PZPS Spała	Hala Orbita, Wrocław; Attendance: 1,500; Referees: MICHLIC Agnieszka - SKOWROŃSKI Grzegorz
February 5, 2016; 21:00	(25–20, 25–22, 25–16) MVP: Marcin Janusz			Hala Orbita, Wrocław; Attendance: 1,500; Referees: MICHLIC Agnieszka - SKOWROŃSKI Grzegorz

February 6, 2016; 18:00	Asseco Resovia Rzeszów	1–3	PGE Skra Bełchatów	Hala Orbita, Wrocław; Attendance: 2,300; Referees: KUCHNA Andrzej - MAROSZEK Wojciech
February 6, 2016; 18:00	(25–18, 20–25, 18–25, 24–26) MVP: Facundo Conte			Hala Orbita, Wrocław; Attendance: 2,300; Referees: KUCHNA Andrzej - MAROSZEK Wojciech

February 7, 2016; 14:45	ZAKSA Kędzierzyn-Koźle	2–3	PGE Skra Bełchatów	Hala Orbita, Wrocław; Attendance: 2,950; Referees: TWARDOWSKI Maciej - BURKIEWICZ Paweł
February 7, 2016; 14:45	(25–12, 23–25, 25–22, 26–28, 17–19) MVP: Mariusz Wlazły			Hala Orbita, Wrocław; Attendance: 2,950; Referees: TWARDOWSKI Maciej - BURKIEWICZ Paweł

=== 2015–16 CEV Champions League ===
==== Pool E ====
November 5, 2015; 18:00	VK Dukla Liberec (Czech Republic)	0–3	(Poland) PGE Skra Bełchatów	Home Credit Arena, Liberec; Attendance: 2,800; Referees: KELLENBERGER Jörg (GER) - MITEV Ignat (BUL)
November 5, 2015; 18:00	(16–25, 22–25, 19–25)			Home Credit Arena, Liberec; Attendance: 2,800; Referees: KELLENBERGER Jörg (GER) - MITEV Ignat (BUL)

November 18, 2015; 18:00	PGE Skra Bełchatów (Poland)	1–3	(Italy) Cucine Lube Treia	Atlas Arena, Łódź; Attendance: 8,247; Referees: MEZÖFFY Zsolt (HUN) - MARKOV Victor (RUS)
November 18, 2015; 18:00	(28–30, 25–18, 21–25, 20–25)			Atlas Arena, Łódź; Attendance: 8,247; Referees: MEZÖFFY Zsolt (HUN) - MARKOV Victor (RUS)

December 1, 2015; 18:00	PGE Skra Bełchatów (Poland)	3–0	(Belgium) Knack Randstad Roeselare	Atlas Arena, Łódź; Attendance: 8,000; Referees: HOSNUT Onur (TUR) - SCHIMPL Igor (SVK)
December 1, 2015; 18:00	(25–23, 27–25, 25–18)			Atlas Arena, Łódź; Attendance: 8,000; Referees: HOSNUT Onur (TUR) - SCHIMPL Igor (SVK)

December 15, 2015; 20:30	Knack Randstad Roeselare (Belgium)	1–3	(Poland) PGE Skra Bełchatów	Sporthal Schiervelde, Roeselare; Attendance: 2,000; Referees: GAUPP Gilles (FRA) - STANISIC Sascha (SWI)
December 15, 2015; 20:30	(19–25, 15–25, 25–21, 14–25)			Sporthal Schiervelde, Roeselare; Attendance: 2,000; Referees: GAUPP Gilles (FRA) - STANISIC Sascha (SWI)

January 20, 2016; 20:30	Cucine Lube Treia (Italy)	3–0	(Poland) PGE Skra Bełchatów	Eurosuole Forum, Civitanova Marche; Attendance: 14,740; Referees: COLLADOS Fabrice (FRA) - AKINCI Erdal (TUR)
January 20, 2016; 20:30	(25–16, 33–31, 25–16)			Eurosuole Forum, Civitanova Marche; Attendance: 14,740; Referees: COLLADOS Fabrice (FRA) - AKINCI Erdal (TUR)

January 26, 2016; 18:00	PGE Skra Bełchatów (Poland)	3–0	(Czech Republic) VK Dukla Liberec	Energia Hall, Bełchatów; Attendance: 2,700; Referees: KNIZHNIKOV Nikolai (RUS) - MARKELJ Blaz (SVK)
January 26, 2016; 18:00	(25–18, 25–17, 25–19)			Energia Hall, Bełchatów; Attendance: 2,700; Referees: KNIZHNIKOV Nikolai (RUS) - MARKELJ Blaz (SVK)

==== Playoff 12 ====
February 17, 2016; 18:00	PGE Skra Bełchatów (Poland)	3–1	(Turkey) Ziraat Bankası Ankara	Atlas Arena, Łódź; Attendance: 8,390; Referees: LUNGU Silvian (ROM) - VINALIEV Aleksandar (BUL)
February 17, 2016; 18:00	(25–19, 25–27, 25–20, 27–25)			Atlas Arena, Łódź; Attendance: 8,390; Referees: LUNGU Silvian (ROM) - VINALIEV Aleksandar (BUL)

March 2, 2016; 19:00	Ziraat Bankası Ankara (Turkey)	3–2	(Poland) PGE Skra Bełchatów	Başkent Volleyball Hall, Ankara; Attendance: 4,500; Referees: RAPISARDA Daniele (ITA) - DELIKOSTIDIS Sotirios (GRE)
March 2, 2016; 19:00	(20–25, 13–25, 28–26, 28–26, 15–10)			Başkent Volleyball Hall, Ankara; Attendance: 4,500; Referees: RAPISARDA Daniele (ITA) - DELIKOSTIDIS Sotirios (GRE)

==== Playoff 6 ====
16 March 2016; 19:30; Time is Moscow Time (UTC+03:00).	Zenit Kazan (Russia)	2–3	(Poland) PGE Skra Bełchatów	Kazan Volleyball Centre, Kazan; Attendance: 4,320; Referees: PASQUALI Fabrizio (ITA) - MARKELJ Blaz (SLO)
16 March 2016; 19:30; Time is Moscow Time (UTC+03:00).	(25–23, 25–21, 23–25, 25–27, 16–18)			Kazan Volleyball Centre, Kazan; Attendance: 4,320; Referees: PASQUALI Fabrizio (ITA) - MARKELJ Blaz (SLO)

24 March 2016; 18:00; Time is Central European Time (UTC+01:00).	PGE Skra Bełchatów (Poland)	0–3	(Russia) Zenit Kazan	Atlas Arena, Łódź; Attendance: 12,500; Referees: SALTALIPPI Fabrizio (ITA) - DOBREV Dobromir (BUL)
24 March 2016; 18:00; Time is Central European Time (UTC+01:00).	(19–25, 23–25, 19–25)			Atlas Arena, Łódź; Attendance: 12,500; Referees: SALTALIPPI Fabrizio (ITA) - DOBREV Dobromir (BUL)
