= Enrique de la Fuente =

Spanish volleyball player

Personal information
- Full name: Enrique de la Fuente Santos
- Nationality: Spanish
- Born: 11 August 1975 (age 51); Vigo, Spain
- Height: 1.95 m (6 ft 5 in)
- Weight: 92 kg (203 lb)
- Spike: 348 cm (137 in)
- Block: 328 cm (129 in)

Volleyball information
- Position: Outside hitter
- Number: 17

Career
Years	Teams
1996–1997; 1997–1999; 1999–2001; 2001–2003; 2003–2006; 2006–2007; 2007–2008; 2008–2009; 2009–2010; 2010–2011; 2011–2012	Vigo Pontevedra; AS Cannes Volley-Ball; Trentino Volley; Pallavolo Piacenza; Sir Safety Perugia; Gabeca Pallavolo Spa; CV Pòrtol; Galatasaray Istanbul; Arkas Izmir; Lotos Trefl Gdańsk; Club Vigo Voleibol

National team
1995-2008	Spain
Honours
Men's volleyball
Representing Spain
European Championship
Gold medal – first place	2007 Russia	Team
European League
Gold medal – first place	2007 Portugal	Team
Bronze medal – third place	2005 Russia	Team
Summer Universiade
Silver medal – second place	1995 Fukuoka	Team
- Last updated: 25 January 2018

Enrique de la Fuente Santos (born 11 August 1975) is a Spanish volleyball player, a member of Spain men's national volleyball team, a participant of the Olympic Games Sydney 2000, European Champion 2007, a medalist of the European League (gold in 2007, bronze in 2005).

== Personal life ==
De la Fuente was born in Vigo, Spain. His wife is French-Polish volleyball player Kinga Maculewicz-De La Fuente.

== Career ==
In 2010-2011, de la Fuente played for the Polish club Lotos Trefl Gdańsk.

== Sporting achievements ==
=== National team ===
- 1995 Universiade
- 2005 European League
- 2007 European League
- 2007 CEV European Championship
