= Guillermo Falasca =

Spanish volleyball player and coach (born 1977)

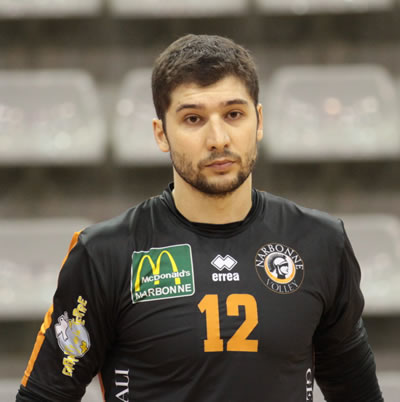
- Guillermo Falasca in 2013

Personal information
- Full name: Guillermo Falasca Fernández
- Nationality: Spanish
- Born: 24 October 1977 (age 49); Mendoza, Argentina
- Height: 2.00 m (6 ft 7 in)

Coaching information
Previous teams coached
Years	Teams
2015–2018; 2018–2023; 2023–2025; 2025	CV Alcobendas; Narbonne Volley; Cisterna Volley; Norwid Częstochowa

Volleyball information
- Position: Opposite

Career
Years	Teams
2000–2001; 2001–2003; 2003–2004; 2004–2006; 2006–2007; 2007–2008; 2008–2009; 2009–2010; 2010–2011; 2011–2012; 2012–2015	Stade Poitevin Poitiers; Knack Roeselare; Volley Taviano; Lupi Santa Croce; CV Pòrtol; LIG Greaters; Volley Piacenza; SGK Ankara; Volley Forlì; Volley Callipo; Narbonne Volley

National team
Spain
Honours
Men's volleyball
Representing Spain
CEV European Championship
Gold medal – first place	2007 Russia
European League
Gold medal – first place	2007 Portugal
Bronze medal – third place	2005 Russia
Mediterranean Games
Silver medal – second place	2005 Almería
Silver medal – second place	2009 Pescara

Guillermo Falasca Fernández (born 24 October 1977) is a Spanish volleyball coach and former player born in Argentina. Falasca became topscorer and best server at the 2005 European League, in which Spain ended up in third place in the overall-rankings. And he was a member of South Korean Gumi LIG Insurance Greaters in the V-League 2007–08 season. A resident of Málaga he was a member of the Men's National Team that won the 2007 European title in Moscow, Russia. He has two daughters: Alessia Falasca (born 2006) and Martina Falasca (born 2010).
