= 2007 Men's European Volleyball League =

Tournament details
- Host country: Portugal
- Dates: May 25 – July 1 (qualification); July 7/8 (final four)
- Teams: 12
- Venue: 1 (in 1 host city)

Final positions
- Champions: Spain (1st title)

Tournament awards
- MVP: (Spain) Guillermo Falasca

The 2007 Men's European Volleyball League was the fourth edition of the European Volleyball League, organised by Europe's governing volleyball body, the CEV. The Final Four was held in Portimão, Portugal from 7 to 8 July 2005.

== Competing nations ==
- Belgium
- Czech Republic
- Germany
- Greece
- Latvia
- Netherlands
- Portugal
- Romania
- Slovakia
- Slovenia
- Spain
- Turkey

== League round ==
=== Pool A ===
Pos	Team	Pld	W	L	Pts	SW	SL	SR	SPW	SPL	SPR	Qualification
1	Spain	12	8	4	20	30	18	1.667	1088	998	1.090	Final Four
2	Germany	12	8	4	20	28	21	1.333	1091	1048	1.041	
3	Netherlands	12	6	6	18	23	22	1.045	988	1008	0.980	
4	Belgium	12	2	10	14	13	33	0.394	941	1054	0.893	

=== Pool B ===
Pos	Team	Pld	W	L	Pts	SW	SL	SR	SPW	SPL	SPR	Qualification
1	Slovenia	12	9	3	21	32	19	1.684	1146	1078	1.063	Final Four
2	Portugal (Note: Qualified as hosts) (H)	12	7	5	19	26	21	1.238	1074	1055	1.018	Final Four
3	Greece	12	5	7	17	19	25	0.760	972	1003	0.969	
4	Czech Republic	12	3	9	15	17	29	0.586	995	1051	0.947	

(H) Host

=== Pool C ===
Pos	Team	Pld	W	L	Pts	SW	SL	SR	SPW	SPL	SPR	Qualification
1	Slovakia	12	10	2	22	32	17	1.882	1173	1082	1.084	Final Four
2	Turkey	12	9	3	21	31	18	1.722	1137	1054	1.079	
3	Romania	12	3	9	15	18	33	0.545	1104	1205	0.916	
4	Latvia	12	2	10	14	19	32	0.594	1111	1184	0.938	

=== Semi-finals ===
Date	Time		Score		Set 1	Set 2	Set 3	Set 4	Set 5	Total	Report
7 Jul	16:00	Slovenia	1–3	Spain	25–23	22–25	18–25	23–25		88–98	Report
7 Jul	18:30	Portugal	3–1	Slovakia	25–21	20–25	25–21	25–23		95–90	Report

=== Third place match ===
Date	Time		Score		Set 1	Set 2	Set 3	Set 4	Set 5	Total	Report
8 Jul	16:00	Slovenia	1–3	Slovakia	18–25	25–20	19–25	18–25		80–95	Report

=== Final ===
Date	Time		Score		Set 1	Set 2	Set 3	Set 4	Set 5	Total	Report
8 Jul	18:30	Spain	3–2	Portugal	21–25	25–18	25–22	19–25	20–18	110–108	Report

== Final standing ==
Rank	Team
1st place, gold medalist(s)	Spain
2nd place, silver medalist(s)	Portugal
3rd place, bronze medalist(s)	Slovakia
4	Slovenia
5	Turkey
6	Germany
7	Netherlands
8	Greece
9	Romania
10	Czech Republic
11	Latvia
12	Belgium

2007 European League champions

Spain
1st title

12-man Roster for Final Round
Enrique de la Fuente, Guillermo Falasca, Miguel Angel Falasca, Alfonso Flores, Julian Garcia-Torres, José Luis Lobato, José Luis Molto, Ibán Pérez, Francisco José Rodríguez, Israel Rodríguez, Manuel Sevillano, José Javier Subiela
Head coach
Andrea Anastasi

== Awards ==
- Most valuable player
  (Spain) Guillermo Falasca
- Best scorer
  (Spain) Guillermo Falasca
- Best spiker
  (Portugal) Hugo Gaspar
- Best blocker
  (Slovakia) Emanuel Kohút
- Best server
  (Portugal) André Lopes
- Best setter
  (Slovakia) Michal Masný
- Best receiver
  (Spain) Israel Rodríguez
- Best libero
  (Portugal) Carlos Teixeira
