= Carlos Carreño =

Spanish volleyball player (born 1973)

Personal information
- Full name: Carlos Luís Carreño Cejudo
- Nationality: Spanish
- Born: 19 April 1973 (age 53); Almería, Spain
Honours
Men's volleyball
Representing Spain
Summer Universiade
Silver medal – second place	1995 Fukuoka	Men
Mediterranean Games
Silver medal – second place	2005 Almeria	Men

Carlos Luís Carreño Cejudo (born 19 April 1973) is a Spanish volleyball player who represented his native country at the 2000 Summer Olympics in Sydney, Australia. There he finished ninth place with the Men's National Team.

== Sporting achievements ==
=== National team ===
- 1995 Universiade
