= Kinga Maculewicz-De La Fuente =

French volleyball player (born 1978)

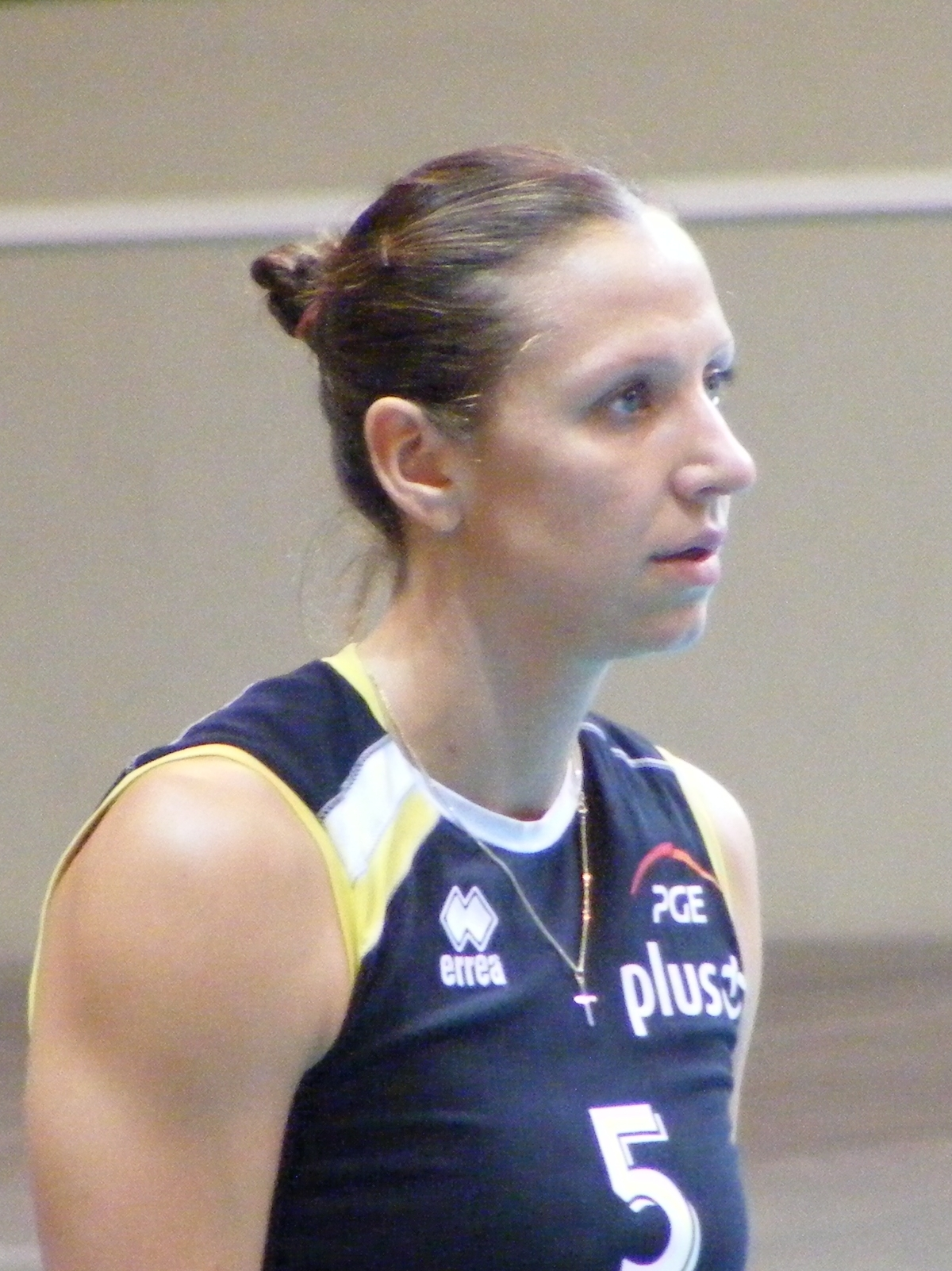
- Maculewicz in 2010

Personal information
- Full name: Kinga Maculewicz-De La Fuente (née Maculewicz)
- Nationality: French; Polish
- Born: 25 May 1978 (age 48); Kraków, Poland
- Height: 1.86 m (6 ft 1 in)
- Weight: 70 kg (154 lb)

Volleyball information
- Position: Middle blocker

Career
Years	Teams
1994–1999; 1999–2003; 2003–2005; 2005–2007; 2007–2008; 2008–2010; 2010–2011	AS Cannes Volley-Ball; Volley 2000 Spezzano; Volley 2002 Forlì; Robursport Volley Pesaro; Club 15-15; Vakıfbank Spor Kulübü; Atom Trefl Sopot

National team
France
- Last updated: 25 January 2018

Kinga Maculewicz-De La Fuente (née Maculewicz; born 25 May 1978) is a French former volleyball player, a member of France women's national volleyball team between 1994 and 2011.

== Personal life ==
She was born in Kraków, Poland, but she grew up in France. Her parents are Krystyna Maculewicz, a Polish former volleyball player and bronze medalist at the 1971 European Championship, and retired Polish footballer Henryk Maculewicz. She has an older half-sister, Monika. At age 18, she found out her biological father was Polish volleyball coach Andrzej Niemczyk; because of that she has three more half-sisters, also volleyball players: Małgorzata (born 1969), Saskia, and Natascha (born 1990). Natascha holds German nationality like her mother. She is married to Spanish volleyball player and 2007 European champion Enrique de la Fuente.

== Career ==
In 2010-2011 she played for Polish club Atom Trefl Sopot. She ended her sporting career in 2011.
