= Juan José Salvador =

Spanish volleyball player (born 1975)

Personal information
- Born: December 18, 1975 (age 50) Pechina, Almería, Spain
Medal record
Men's volleyball
Representing Spain
Mediterranean Games
Silver medal – second place	2005 Almería	Team
Summer Universiade
Silver medal – second place	1995 Fukuoka	Team

Juan José Salvador Jiménez (born December 18, 1975) is a Spanish volleyball player who represented his native country at the 2000 Summer Olympics in Sydney, Australia. There he finished ninth place with the Men's National Team.

== Sporting achievements ==
=== National team ===
- 1995 Universiade
