= Casilla =

Casilla is a Spanish surname, and may refer to:

- Alexi Casilla (born 1984), Dominican Major League Baseball infielder
- José Antonio Casilla (born 1979), Spanish volleyball player
- Kiko Casilla (born 1986), Spanish footballer
- Robert Casilla (born 1959), American artist and illustrator
- Santiago Casilla (born 1980), Dominican Major League Baseball relief pitcher

== See also ==
- Pabellón Municipal de Deportes La Casilla, 5000-seat arena in Bilbao, Spain
