= Iribarne =

Iribarne is Basque place name and surname. Notable people with the surname include:

- Alberto Iribarne (born 1950), Argentine politician
- Francisco Iribarne (born 1998), Spanish volleyball player
- Louis Iribarne, translator from Polish into English
- Manuel Fraga Iribarne (1922−2012), Spanish politician
- Simone Iribarne Lafargue, French tennis player
