= Carlos Mora =

Carlos Mora may refer to:

- Carlos Mora (volleyball) (born 1990), Spanish volleyball player
- Carlos Mora (footballer) (born 2001), Costa Rican footballer
