= Juan Carlos Robles =

Spanish volleyball player (born 1967)

Personal information
- Full name: Juan Carlos Robles Ania
- Nationality: Spanish
- Born: December 29, 1967 (age 58); Gijón, Asturias, Spain
Honours
Representing Spain
Summer Universiade
Silver medal – second place	1995 Fukuoka	Men

Juan Carlos Robles Ania (born 29 December 1967 in Gijón, Asturias) is a Spanish volleyball player who represented his native country with the men's national team twice at the Summer Olympics: in 1992 and 2000.

== Sporting achievements ==
=== National team ===
- 1995 Universiade
