= Ernesto Rodríguez =

Spanish volleyball player

Personal information
- Full name: Ernesto Hernán Rodríguez Gómez
- Nationality: Spanish
- Born: 15 January 1969 (age 57); Cordoba, Argentina
- Height: 191 cm (6 ft 3 in)

Volleyball information
- Position: Outside hitter
- Number: 15

National team
1991-2001	Spain
Honours
Representing Spain
Summer Universiade
Silver medal – second place	1995 Fukuoka	Men

Ernesto Hernán Rodríguez Gómez (born 15 January 1969, in Cordoba, Argentina) is a volleyball player who represented Spain at the 2000 Summer Olympics in Sydney, Australia. There he finished ninth place with the Spanish men's national volleyball team. He also competed at the 1992 Summer Olympics in Barcelona, Spain.

== Sporting achievements ==
=== National team ===
- 1995 Universiade
