= Dujic =

Dujic may refer to:

- Dujić (pronounced [dûːjitɕ]), a South Slavic surname
- Đujić (pronounced [dʑûːjitɕ]), a South Slavic surname
