= Volleyball at the 2009 Mediterranean Games =

== Medalists ==
| Event | Gold | Silver | Bronze |
|---|---|---|---|
| Men's competition | Italy; Roberto Cazzaniga; Giorgio De Togni; Simone Tiberti; Davide Saitta; Andrea Giovi; Marcello Forni; Francesco De Marchi; Vincenzo Tamburo; Michele Grassano; Gabriele Maruotti; Ivan Zaytsev; Rocco Barone | Spain; Guillermo Falasca; Iban Perez; Daniel Rocamora; Carlos Mora; Alexis Valido; Miguel Angel Falasca; Manuel Parres; Sergio Noda; Jose Antonio Casilla; Julián García Torres; Modesto Juan Guerrero; Israel Rodriguez | Slovenia; Andrej Flajs; Alen Pajenk; Matej Vidič; Alen Šket; Klemen Cebulj; Damir Sabec; Tine Urnaut; Dejan Vincic; Vid Jakopin; Gregor Ropret; Jan Planinc; Miha Plot |
| Women's competition | Italy; Simona Rinieri; Paola Croce; Monica Ravetta; Giulia Rondon; Francesca Marcon; Martina Guiggi; Jenny Barazza; Manuela Secolo; Francesca Piccinini; Eleonora Lo Bianco; Simona Gioli; Taismary Agüero | Turkey; Pelin Celik; Gizem Guresen; Nihan Yeldan; Ayse Goksen Denkel; Bahar Toksoy; Deniz Hakyemez; Ozge Kirdar; Naz Aydemir; Esra Gumus; Ipek Soroglu; Neslihan Darnel; Seda Tokatlioglu | Croatia; Ana Grbac; Jelena Balić; Marina Miletić; Mirela Delić; Sanja Popović; Cecilia Dujić; Mia Jerkov; Ilijana Dugandžić; Biljana Gligorović; Senna Ušić Jogunica; Ivana Miloš; Maja Poljak |

== Standings ==
=== Men's Competition ===
| Rank | Team |
|---|---|
| 1st place, gold medalist(s) | Italy |
| 2nd place, silver medalist(s) | Spain |
| 3rd place, bronze medalist(s) | Slovenia |
| 4 | Tunisia |
| 5 | Turkey |
| 6 | Greece |
| 7 | Montenegro |
| 8 | France |
| 9 | Albania |
| 9 | Morocco |

=== Women's Competition ===
| Rank | Team |
|---|---|
| 1st place, gold medalist(s) | Italy |
| 2nd place, silver medalist(s) | Turkey |
| 3rd place, bronze medalist(s) | Croatia |
| 4 | Greece |
| 5 | Bosnia and Herzegovina |
| 6 | France |
| 7 | Algeria |
| 8 | Albania |
