= Volleyball at the 2009 Mediterranean Games – Men's tournament =

Men's Volleyball at the 2009 Mediterranean Games
- Dates: 29 June–5 July 2009

The Men's Volleyball tournament at the 2009 Mediterranean Games was held in Chieti ve Montesilvano.

== Teams ==
Group A

- France
- Greece
- Italy
- Morocco
- Slovenia

Group B

- Albania
- Montenegro
- Spain
- Tunisia
- Turkey

== Preliminary round ==
=== Group A ===
	Team	Points	G	W	L	PW	PL	Ratio	SW	SL	Ratio
1.	Italy	7	4	3	1	387	350	1.106	10	7	1.428
2.	Slovenia	7	4	3	1	356	323	1.102	11	4	2.750
3.	Greece	6	4	2	2	349	347	1.006	9	7	1.286
4.	France	6	4	2	2	300	302	0.993	6	7	0.857
5.	Morocco	4	4	0	4	255	325	0.785	1	12	0.083

- June 29, 2009

Italy	3 – 2	Slovenia	23–25, 24–26, 25–22, 25–23, 18–16

Greece	3 – 1	Morocco	25–27, 25–16, 25–22, 25–21

- June 30, 2009

France	3 – 1	Italy	19–25, 25–19, 29–27, 25–19

Slovenia	3 – 1	Greece	25–19, 25–21, 19–25, 25–21

- July 1, 2009

Greece	3 – 0	France	25–16, 25–23, 25–21

Slovenia	3 – 0	Morocco	25–15, 25–18, 25–22

- July 2, 2009

France	3 – 0	Morocco	25–18, 25–23, 25–21

Italy	3 – 2	Greece	23–25, 19–25, 25–8, 25–19, 15–11

- July 3, 2009

Italy	3 – 0	Morocco	25–16, 25–21, 25–15

Slovenia	3 – 0	France	25–23, 25–23, 25–21

=== Group B ===
	Team	Points	G	W	L	PW	PL	Ratio	SW	SL	Ratio
1.	Spain	8	4	4	0	331	278	1.191	12	2	6.000
2.	Tunisia	7	4	3	1	345	322	1.071	11	4	2.750
3.	Turkey	6	4	2	2	329	311	1.058	7	7	1.000
4.	Montenegro	5	4	1	3	283	291	0.972	4	9	0.444
5.	Albania	4	4	0	4	215	301	0.714	0	12	0.000

- June 29, 2009

Spain	3 – 0	Montenegro	25–21, 25–16, 25–21

Tunisia	3 – 1	Turkey	25–23, 22–25, 25–22, 25–22

- June 30, 2009

Spain	3 – 0	Albania	25–16, 25–22, 25–19

Turkey	3 – 1	Montenegro	25–19, 25–22, 20–25, 25–20

- July 1, 2009

Tunisia	3 – 0	Montenegro	26–24, 25–17, 25–23

Turkey	3 – 0	Albania	25–16, 25–18, 25–19

- July 2, 2009

Tunisia	3 – 0	Albania	25–15, 25–21, 26–24

Spain	3 – 0	Turkey	25–23, 25–21, 25–23

- July 3, 2009

Spain	3 – 2	Tunisia	25–21, 19–25, 22–25, 25–17, 15–8

Montenegro	3 – 0	Albania	25–17, 25–12, 25–16

=== Final round ===
Semi-finals
Tunisia	0
Italy	3
Slovenia	2
Spain	3

Final
Italy	3
Spain	1
Third place
Slovenia	3
Tunisia	0

==== Semi finals ====
- July 4, 2009

Italy	3 – 0	Tunisia	25–22, 25–19, 25–16
Spain	3 – 2	Slovenia	33–35, 30–32, 25–12, 25–18, 15–12

==== Finals ====
- July 4, 2009 — Classification Match (7th/8th place)

Montenegro	3 – 1	France	21–25, 25–23, 33–31, 25–18

- July 4, 2009 — Classification Match (5th/6th place)

Turkey	3 – 0	Greece	25–23, 25–21, 25–23

- July 5, 2009 — Classification Match (Bronze-medal match)

Slovenia	3 – 0	Tunisia	25–18, 25–23, 25–19

- July 5, 2009 — Classification Match (Gold-medal match)

Italy	3 – 1	Spain	25–23, 21–25, 25–16, 25–22

=== Final ranking ===
RANK	TEAM
	Italy
	Spain
	Slovenia
4.	Tunisia
5.	Turkey
6.	Greece
7.	Montenegro
8.	France
9.	Albania
9.	Morocco

=== Awards ===
2009 Men's Mediterranean Games champions

Italy
