= José Antonio Casilla =

Spanish volleyball player (born 1979)

Personal information
- Full name: José Antonio Casilla Cortés
- Nationality: Spanish
- Born: August 29, 1979 (age 47); Tarragona, Catalonia, Spain
Medal record
Men's volleyball
Representing Spain
Mediterranean Games
Silver medal – second place	2009 Pescara	Team

José Antonio Casilla Cortés (born August 29, 1979, in Reus, Tarragona, Catalonia) is a Spanish retired volleyball player who represented his native country at the 2000 Summer Olympics in Sydney, Australia. He finished ninth with the Men's National Team.
