= VC Dinamo Krasnodar (men's volleyball) =

Russian volleyball club

Dynamo Krasnodar
- Full name: Volleyball Club "Dynamo" Krasnodar
- Short name: Dynamo Krasnodar
- Founded: 1994
- Ground: Olimp Palace of Sport Hall; Krasnodar (Capacity: 3,000)
- Manager: Andrei Voronkov
- Captain: Vladislav Zhloba
- League: Russian Volleyball Super League
- 2015/16: 13

Uniforms
Home	Away

VC Dynamo Krasnodar (Russian: Динамо Краснодар), or VC Dinamo Krasnodar, is a Russian professional men's volleyball teams, based in Krasnodar, playing in Super League since 2010.

== Team roster ==
=== 2016/2017 ===
Head coach: (Russia) Andrei Voronkov

No.	Name	Date of birth	Position
1	(Russia) Vladislav Zhloba	March 2, 1982 (age 43)	setter
2	(Russia) Artem Zelenkov	June 8, 1987 (age 38)	libero
3	(Russia) Azizbek Ismailov	August 10, 1995 (age 30)	setter
5	(Russia) Makar Bestuzhev	May 13, 1987 (age 38)	outside hitter
6	(Russia) Sergey Bagrey	August 14, 1987 (age 38)	setter
7	(Russia) Oleg Sychev	April 29, 1988 (age 37)	middle blocker
8	(Russia) Semyon Poltavskiy	February 8, 1981 (age 44)	opposite
9	(Russia) Vladimir Melnik	July 21, 1980 (age 45)	outside hitter
10	(Russia) Gregory Afinogenov	March 25, 1980 (age 45)	middle blocker
12	(Russia) Alexander Voropaev	October 19, 1993 (age 32)	setter
14	(Russia) Maxim Maximenko	November 13, 1994 (age 31)	libero
15	(Russia) Levan Kalandadze	December 28, 1989 (age 35)	opposite
17	(Russia) Oleg Tsentalovich	January 17, 1991 (age 34)	outside hitter
18	(Russia) Arkadi Kozlov	January 30, 1981 (age 44)	middle blocker
20	(Russia) Maxim Panteleymonenko	September 1, 1981 (age 44)	outside hitter

== Notable players ==
Notable, former or current players of club, who are medalist of intercontinental tournaments in national teams or clubs.

- 2012–2013 (Argentina) Facundo Conte
- 2015–present (Russia) Semyon Poltavskiy
