= Masný =

Masný or Masny (feminine form Masná or Masna) is a Czech–Slovak (Masný/Masná) or Polish (Masny/Masna) surname. It is derived either from Czech maso or Slovak mäso for "meat" or from Old Polish masny, maśny (cf. the Polish adjective mięsny) with the meaning "meat-", "meaty", all originating from Proto-Slavic *męso ("meat").
People with this name include:

- Karol Masny (1887–1968), Polish officer
- Lenka Masná (born 1985), Czech runner
- Magdalena Masny (born 1969), Polish model
- Marián Masný (born 1950), Slovak former football player
- Michal Masný (born 1979), Slovak volleyball player
- Vojtech Masný (born 1938), Slovak former football player

== See also ==
- Masny, commune in the Nord department in northern France
