= Ibán Pérez =

Spanish volleyball player (born 1983)

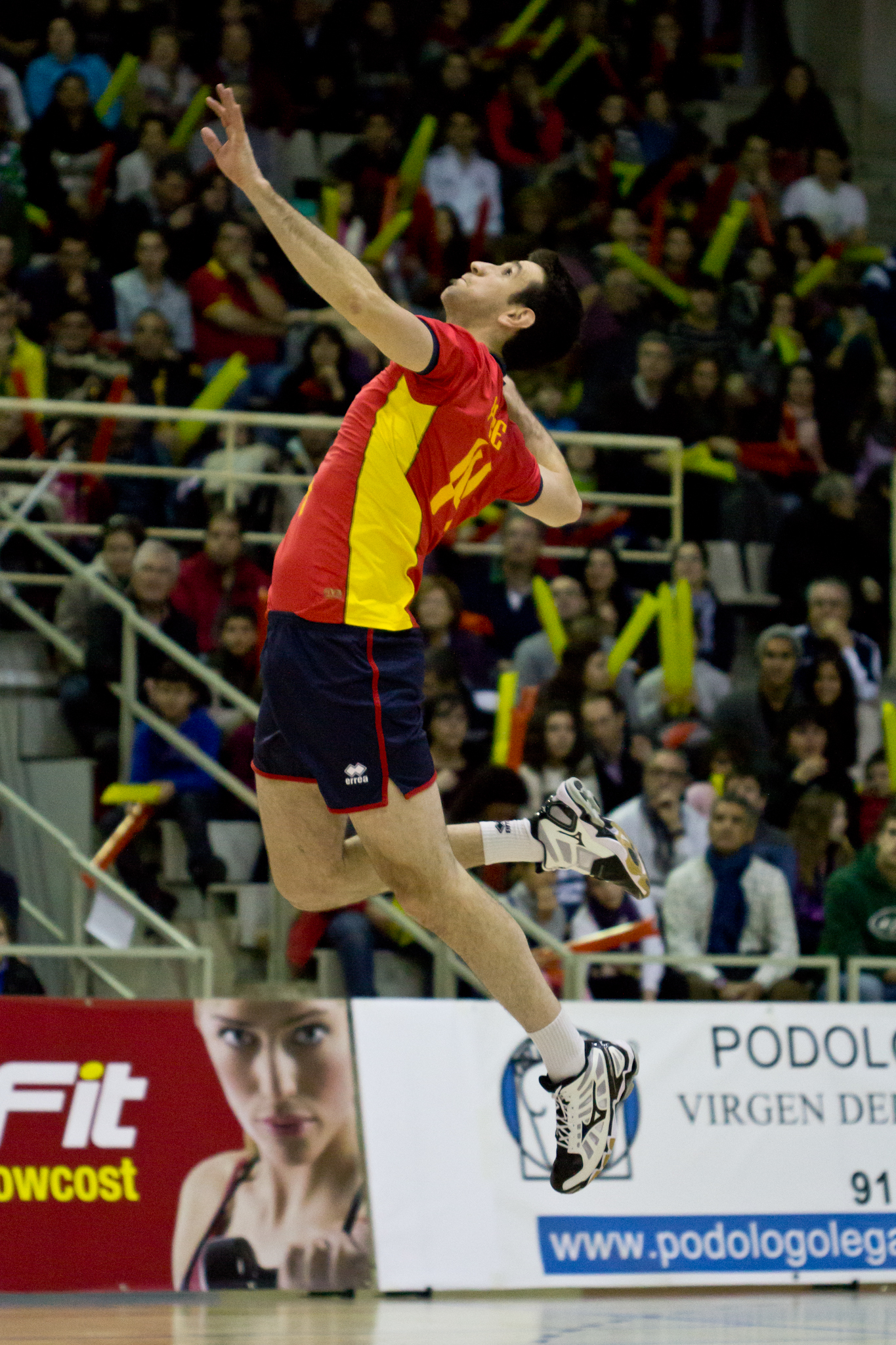
- Ibán Pérez during a Spain vs Portugal volleyball game in Leganés, Spain.

Personal information
- Full name: Ibán Pérez Manzanares
- Nationality: Spanish
- Born: November 13, 1983 (age 42); Barcelona, Spain
Medal record
Men's volleyball
Representing Spain
European Championship
Gold medal – first place	2007 Moscow	Team
Mediterranean Games
Silver medal – second place	2009 Pescara	Team

Ibán Pérez Manzanares (born November 13, 1983, in Barcelona) is a volleyball player from Spain men's national volleyball team. Pérez represented Spain at the 2007 European Championship in Moscow, Russia. He was honored as the best scorer at the 2010 FIVB Men's World Championship.

== Individual awards ==
- 2010 FIVB Volleyball World Championship "Best Scorer"
