= Augusto Colito =

Spanish volleyball player (born 1997)

Personal information
- Full name: Augusto Renato Colito
- Nationality: Spanish
- Born: 23 January 1997 (age 29)
- Height: 1.96 m (6 ft 5 in)
- Weight: 81 kg (179 lb)
- Spike: 358 cm (141 in)
- Block: 335 cm (132 in)

Volleyball information
- Position: Opposite
- Current club: CV Río Duero Soria
- Number: 10

National team
Spain

Augusto Renato Colito (born 23 January 1997) is a Spanish volleyball player for CV Río Duero Soria and the Spanish national team.

He participated at the 2017 Men's European Volleyball Championship.
