= Mia Jerkov =

Croatian volleyball player (born 1982)

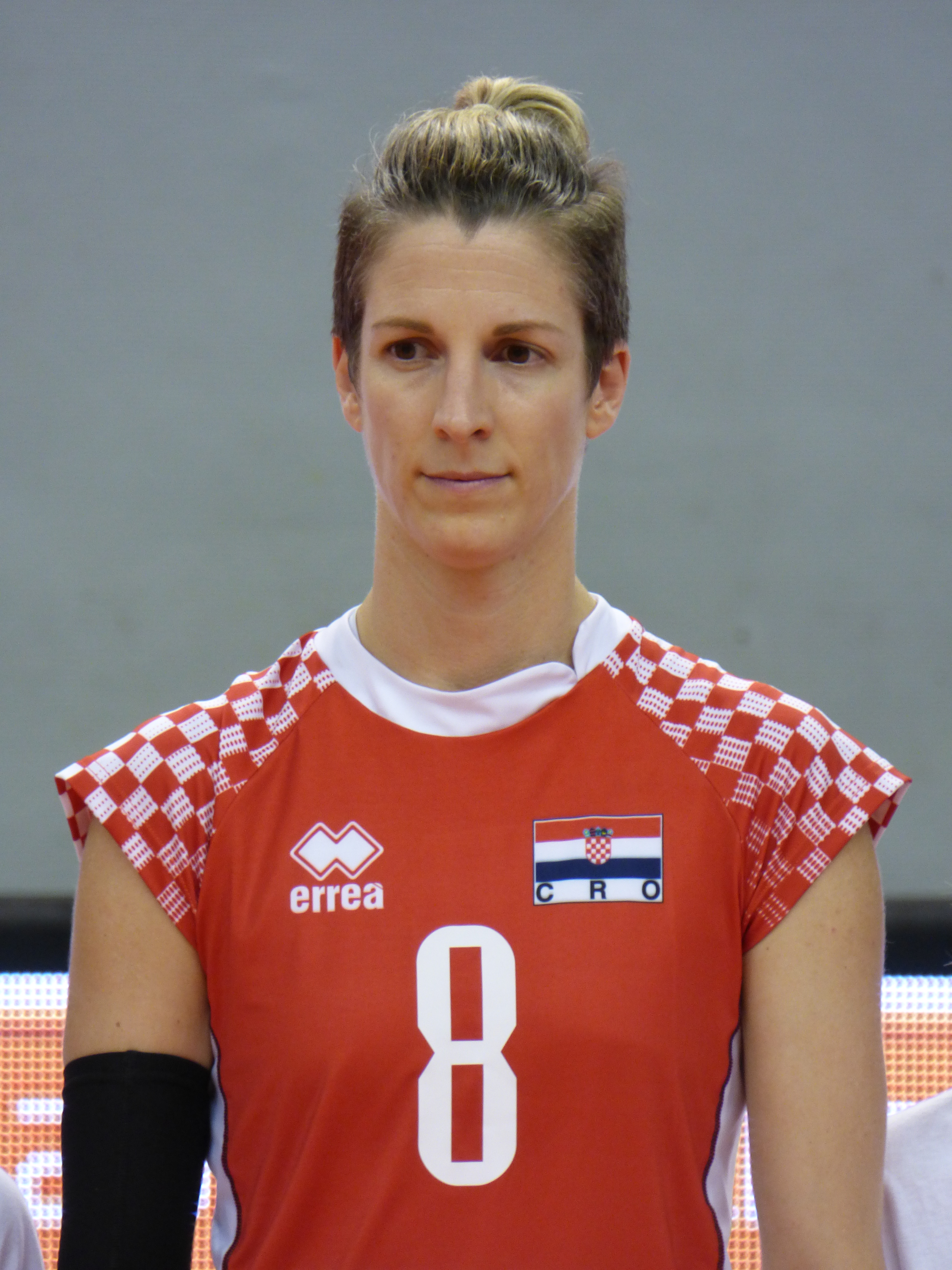

Personal information
- Born: 5 December 1982 (age 43)
- Home town: Split, Croatia
- Height: 1.92 m (6 ft 3 1/2 in)
- Weight: 68 kg (150 lb)
- Spike: 310 cm (120 in)
- Block: 295 cm (116 in)

Volleyball information
- Current club: (Hungary) BRSE Békéscsaba
Medal record
Women's volleyball
Representing Croatia
European Championship
Silver medal – second place	1999 Italy	Team
Mediterranean Games
Bronze medal – third place	2009 Pescara	Team

Mia Jerkov (born 5 December 1982) is a Croatian volleyball player who currently plays for BRSE Békéscsaba in the Hungarian NB1. She plays as a wing spiker.

== Career ==
Jerkov competed with the Croatian national team in the 2001 European Championship, ranking in the 9-12th place; the 2005 European Championship, ranking in eighth place; the 2009 Mediterranean Games, winning the bronze medal; the 2010 World Championship, ranking in the 17-20th place; the 2014 World Championship, ranking in the 13-14th place; and the 2014 World Grand Prix, ranking with her national team in the 23rd place.

== Family ==
Mia Jerkov is the daughter of Željko Jerkov a double Olympic medalist in basketball for Yugoslavia.
