= Ignacio Sánchez (volleyball player) =

Spanish volleyball player (born 1991)

Personal information
- Nationality: Spanish
- Born: 24 February 1991 (age 35)
- Height: 191 cm (6 ft 3 in)
- Weight: 76 kg (168 lb)
- Spike: 332 cm (131 in)
- Block: 321 cm (126 in)

Volleyball information
- Number: 24 (national team)

Career
Years	Teams
2015	CV Unicaja Almería

National team
2015	Spain

Ignacio Sánchez (born 24 February 1991) is a Spanish male volleyball player. He is part of the Spain men's national volleyball team. On club level he plays for CV Unicaja Almería.
