= Francisco Ruiz (volleyball) =

Spanish volleyball player (born 1991)

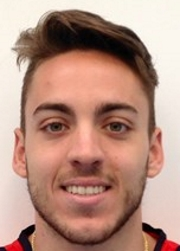

Personal information
- Full name: Francisco José Ruiz
- Nationality: Spanish
- Born: 7 June 1991 (age 35)
- Height: 1.78 m (5 ft 10 in)
- Weight: 75 kg (165 lb)
- Spike: 344 cm (135 in)
- Block: 322 cm (127 in)

Volleyball information
- Position: Outside spiker
- Current club: Volley Marcianise
- Number: 17

Career
Years	Teams
	Volley Marcianise

National team
Spain

Francisco José Ruiz (born 7 June 1991) is a Spanish male volleyball player. He is part of the Spain men's national volleyball team. On club level he plays for Volley Marcianise.
