= Venancio Costa =

Spanish volleyball player (born 1967)

Personal information
- Born: 23 August 1967 (age 59) Alicante, Spain

Sport
- Sport: Volleyball
Medal record
Representing Spain
Summer Universiade
Silver medal – second place	1995 Fukuoka	Men
Mediterranean Games
Silver medal – second place	1993 Narbonne	Men
Bronze medal – third place	1991 Athens	Men

Venancio Costa Monge (born 23 August 1967) is a Spanish former volleyball player who competed in the 1992 Summer Olympics.

== Sporting achievements ==
=== National team ===
- 1995 Universiade
