= Pavel Abramov =

Russian volleyball player (born 1979)

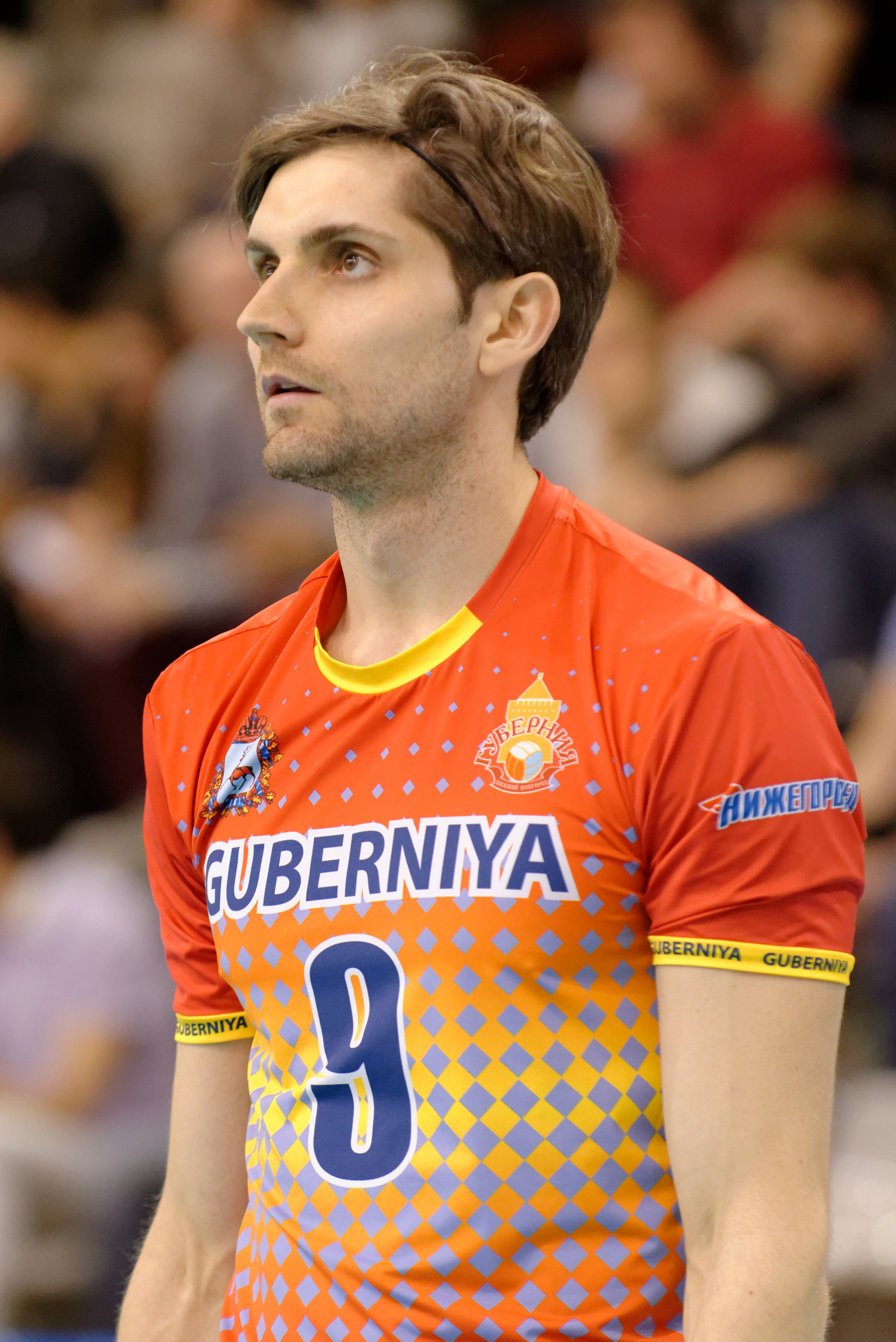

Personal information
- Full name: Pavel Sergeyevich Abramov
- Born: April 23, 1979 (age 47); Moscow, Russia
- Height: 2.00 m (6 ft 7 in)
- Weight: 87 kg (192 lb)
- Spike: 347 cm (137 in)
- Block: 336 cm (132 in)

Volleyball information
- Position: Outside hitter

Career
Years	Teams
1996-1999; 1999-2001; 2001-2003; 2003-2005; 2005-2009; 2009-2010; 2010-2012; 2012-2013; 2013-2014	MGFSO Moscow; Iskra Odintsovo; Dinamo Moscow; Toray Arrows; Iskra Odintsovo; Jastrzębski Węgiel; Iskra Odintsovo; Ural Ufa; Guberniya Nizhniy Novgorod

National team
Russia
Honours
Representing Russia
Men's volleyball
Olympic Games
Bronze medal – third place	2004 Athens
World Championship
Silver medal – second place	2002 Argentina
World Cup
Silver medal – second place	2007 Japan
European Championship
Silver medal – second place	2005 Serbia and Montenegro/Italy
Silver medal – second place	2007 Russia
Bronze medal – third place	2001 Czech Republic
Bronze medal – third place	2003 Berlin
World League
Gold medal – first place	2002 Belo Horizonte
Silver medal – second place	2007 Katowice
Bronze medal – third place	2001 Katowice
Bronze medal – third place	2006 Moscow
- Last updated: 28 December 2017

Pavel Sergeyevich Abramov (born 23 April 1979) is a former Russian volleyball player, a former member of Russia men's national volleyball team, a bronze medalist of the 2004 Olympic Games, a silver medalist of the 2002 World Championship and the 2007 World Cup, medalist of the European Championship and World League.

== Career ==
In November 2014 ended his career.
