= Volleyball at the 1995 Summer Universiade =

Volleyball at the XVIII Summer Universiade
- Venue: various

Volleyball events were contested at the 1995 Summer Universiade in Fukuoka, Japan.

Event	Gold	Silver	Bronze
Men's volleyball	South Korea (KOR)	Spain (ESP) Carlos Carreño; Venancio Costa; Ernesto Rodríguez; Miguel Ángel Falasca; Juan Carlos Robles; Juan Colom; Rafael Pascual; Eduardo Rueda; José Luis Moltó; Juan José Salvador; Enrique de la Fuente; Daniel Castañeda	Italy (ITA) Mauro Radicioni; Lorenzo Cavallini; Marcello Mescoli; Claudio Bonati; Roberto Pietrelli; Andrea Sartoretti; Valerio Vermiglio; Paride Foschi; Cosimo Gallotta; Leondino Giombini; Christian Leonelli; Giacomo Giretto
Women's volleyball	China (CHN)	Japan (JPN)	Russia (RUS)
