= 2005 Men's European Volleyball League =

Tournament details
- Host country: Russia
- Dates: June 3 – July 10 (qualification); July 23/24 (final four)
- Teams: 8
- Venue: 1 (in 1 host city)

Final positions
- Champions: Russia (1st title)

Tournament awards
- MVP: (Russia) Pavel Abramov

The 2005 Men's European Volleyball League was the second edition of the European Volleyball League, organised by Europe's governing volleyball body, the CEV. The final Four was held in Kazan, Russia from 23 to 24 July 2005.

== Competing nations ==
- Czech Republic
- Estonia
- Finland
- Germany
- Russia
- Slovakia
- Spain
- Turkey

== League round ==
=== Pool 1 ===
Pos	Team	Pld	W	L	Pts	SW	SL	SR	SPW	SPL	SPR	Qualification
1	Russia (Note: Qualified as hosts) (H)	12	11	1	23	34	11	3.091	1072	952	1.126	Final Four
2	Finland	12	6	6	18	22	23	0.957	1007	1015	0.992	Final Four
3	Germany	12	5	7	17	21	23	0.913	1025	1001	1.024	
4	Estonia	12	2	10	14	13	33	0.394	965	1101	0.876	

(H) Host

=== Pool 2 ===
Pos	Team	Pld	W	L	Pts	SW	SL	SR	SPW	SPL	SPR	Qualification
1	Turkey	12	8	4	20	30	17	1.765	1094	1000	1.094	Final Four
2	Spain	12	7	5	19	27	21	1.286	1094	1065	1.027	Final Four
3	Slovakia	12	5	7	17	19	29	0.655	1008	1080	0.933	
4	Czech Republic	12	4	8	16	22	31	0.710	1153	1204	0.958	

== Final four ==
Semi-finals
2005-07-23 – Kazan
Turkey	1
Finland	3
2005-07-23 – Kazan
Russia	3
Spain	1

Final
2005-07-24 – Kazan
Finland	0
Russia	3
3rd place
2005-07-24 – Kazan
Turkey	1
Spain	3

=== Semi-finals ===
Date	Time		Score		Set 1	Set 2	Set 3	Set 4	Set 5	Total	Report
23 Jul	15:30	Turkey	1–3	Finland	25–18	26–28	23–25	23–25		97–96	Report
23 Jul	18:30	Russia	3–1	Spain	25–18	23–25	25–12	25–20		98–75	Report

=== 3rd place match ===
Date	Time		Score		Set 1	Set 2	Set 3	Set 4	Set 5	Total	Report
24 Jul	15:00	Turkey	1–3	Spain	25–13	22–25	21–25	21–25		89–88	Report

=== Final ===
Date	Time		Score		Set 1	Set 2	Set 3	Set 4	Set 5	Total	Report
24 Jul	17:30	Finland	0–3	Russia	17–25	20–25	16–25			53–75	Report

== Final standing ==
Rank	Team
1st place, gold medalist(s)	Russia
2nd place, silver medalist(s)	Finland
3rd place, bronze medalist(s)	Spain
4	Turkey
5	Germany
6	Slovakia
7	Czech Republic
8	Estonia

2005 European League champions

Russia
1st title

12-man Roster for Final Round
Pavel Abramov, Sergey Baranov, Yury Berezhko, Andrey Egorchev, Alexey Kazakov, Taras Khtey, Alexey Kuleshov, Sergey Makarov, Vladimir Melnik, Semen Poltavskiy, Konstantin Ushakov, Alexey Verbov
Head coach

== Awards ==
- Most valuable player
  (Russia) Pavel Abramov
- Best scorer
  (Finland) Mikko Oivanen
- Best spiker
  (Finland) Mikko Oivanen
- Best blocker
  (Spain) José Luis Moltó
- Best server
  (Russia) Taras Khtey
- Best setter
  (Finland) Simo-Pekka Olli
- Best libero
  (Turkey) Ali Peçen
