= Semyon Poltavskiy =

Russian volleyball player (born 1981)

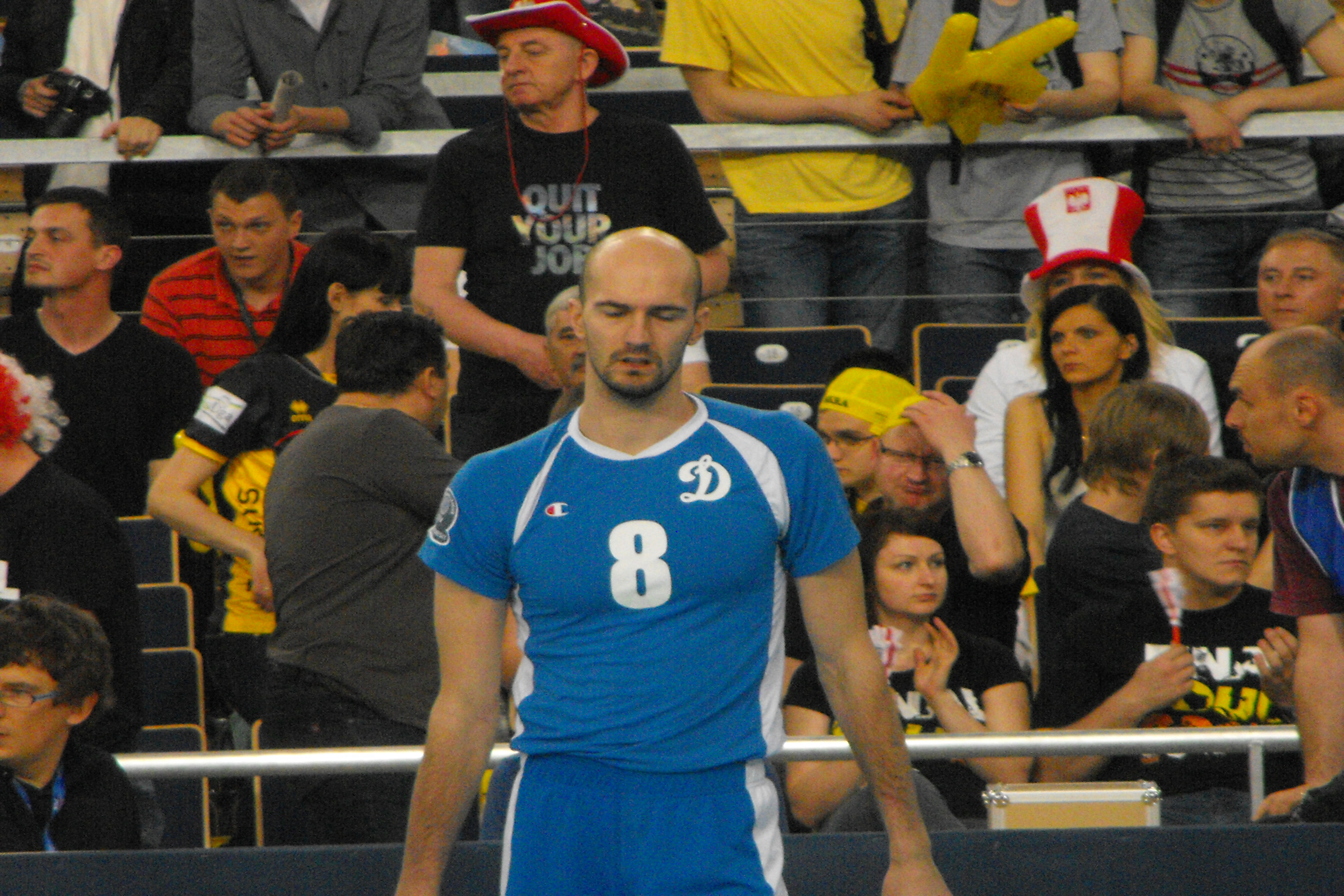

Personal information
- Full name: Semyon Vladimirovich Poltavskiy
- Nationality: Ukrainian; Russian
- Born: 8 February 1981 (age 45); Odessa, Ukrainian SSR, USSR
- Height: 2.05 m (6 ft 9 in)
- Weight: 89 kg (196 lb)
- Spike: 346 cm (136 in)
- Block: 338 cm (133 in)

Volleyball information
- Position: Opposite
- Number: 2

Career
Years	Teams
2000–2001; 2001–2006; 2006–2008; 2008–2009; 2009–2011; 2011–2013; 2013–2015; 2015–2016	Avtomobilist Saint Petersburg; Acqua Paradiso Montichiari; Dianamo Moscow; Yaroslavich Yaroslavl; Fakel Novy Urengoy; Dianamo Moscow; Yaroslavich Yaroslavl; Dinamo Krasnodar

National team
2003–2010	Russia
Honours
Men's volleyball
Representing Russia
Olympic Games
Bronze medal – third place	2008 Beijing	Team
World Cup
Silver medal – second place	2007 Japan
World League
Gold medal – first place	2002 Belo Horizonte
Silver medal – second place	2007 Katowice
Silver medal – second place	2010 Cordoba
Bronze medal – third place	2006 Moscow
Bronze medal – third place	2008 Rio de Janeiro
Bronze medal – third place	2009 Belgrade
European Championship
Silver medal – second place	2005 Serbia and Montenegro/Italy
Silver medal – second place	2007 Russia
Bronze medal – third place	2003 Germany
European League
Gold medal – first place	2005 Russia
- Last updated: 29 December 2017

Semyon Vladimirovich Poltavskiy (Russian: Семён Владимирович Полтавский) (born 8 February 1981 in Odesa, Ukrainian SSR) is a former volleyball player from Russia, who was a member of the men's national team that won the silver medal in both the 2005 and 2007 European Championships. He was named Most Valuable Player in the latter tournament.

== Individual awards ==
- 2007 World League "Best Scorer"
- 2007 World League "Best Server"
- 2007 European Championship "Most Valuable Player"
- 2007 European Championship "Best Server"
- 2007 FIVB World Cup "Best Server"

Awards
Preceded by (Italy) Alberto Cisolla	Most Valuable Player; European Championship; 2007	Succeeded by (Poland) Piotr Gruszka
