= Israel Rodríguez (volleyball) =

Spanish volleyball player

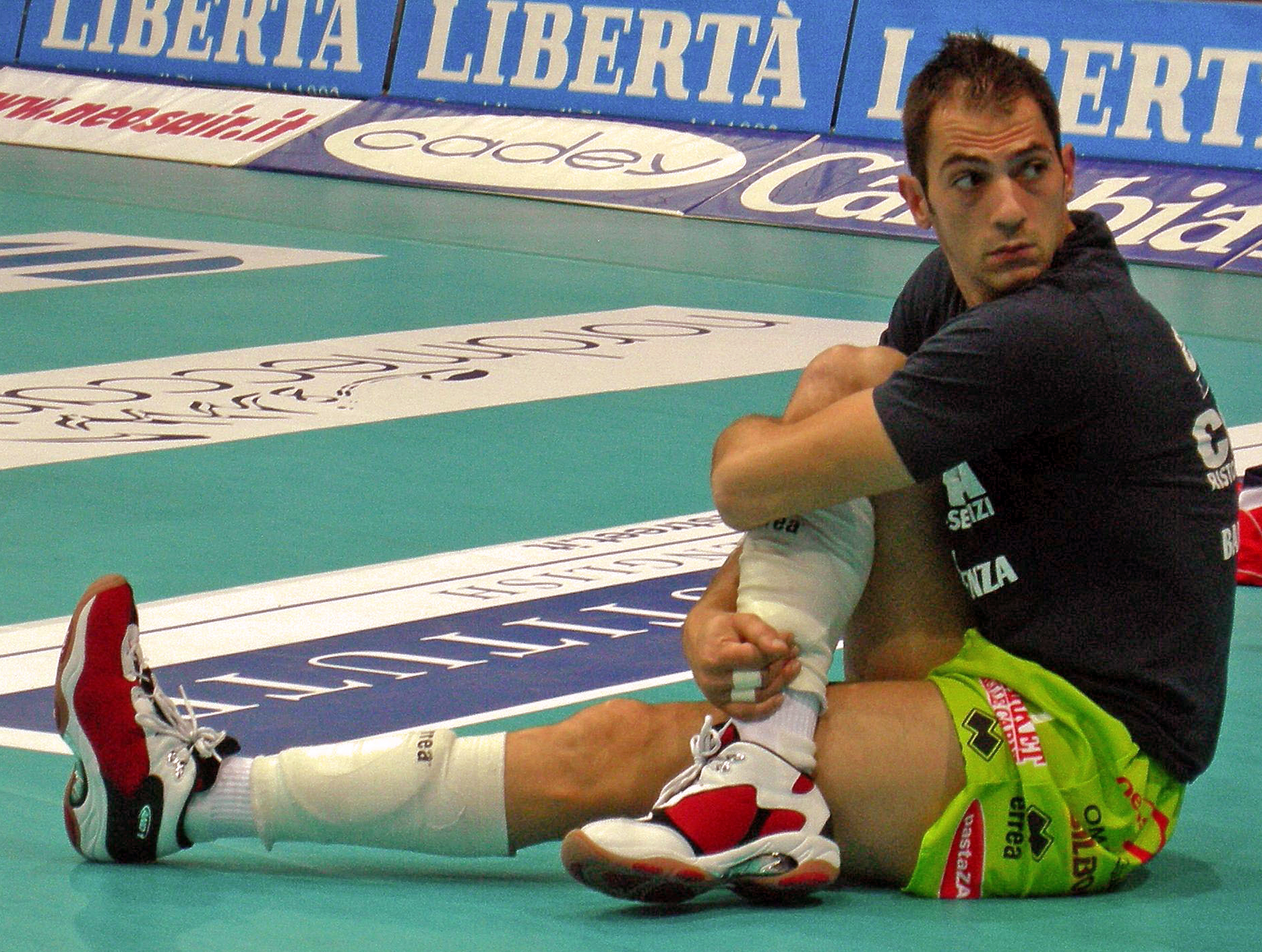

Personal information
- Full name: Israel Rodríguez Calderon
- Nationality: Spanish
- Born: August 27, 1981 (age 45); Seville, Spain
- Hometown: Arahal, Spain
- Height: 1.95 m (6 ft 5 in)
- Weight: 96 kg (212 lb)
- Spike: 347 cm (137 in)
- Block: 325 cm (128 in)

Volleyball information
- Position: Outside hitter
- Current team: CV Almería
- Number: 19

Career
Years	Teams
1999–2001; 2001–2002; 2002–2007; 2007–2008; 2008–2009; 2009–2010; 2010–2012; 2012–2013; 2013–2014; 2014–2015; 2015–2016; 2016–	Aguas de Huelva; CV EMI Gijón; CV Almería; Copra Berni Piacenza; Prisma Volley; EA Patras; New Mater Volley; Chaumont VB 52; Tomis Constanța; Ziraat Bankası Ankara; PGE Skra Bełchatów; CV Almería

National team
2005–	Spain
Medal record
Men's volleyball
Representing Spain
European Championship
Gold medal – first place	2007 Russia	Team
European League
Gold medal – first place	2007 Portugal	Team
Silver medal – second place	2009 Portugal	Team
Mediterranean Games
Silver medal – second place	2009 Pescara	Team
- Last updated: 20 February 2017

Israel Rodríguez Calderon (born 27 August 1981) is a Spanish volleyball player, a member of Spain men's national volleyball team and Spanish club CV Almería, 2007 European Champion, a medalist of the European League (gold in 2007, silver in 2009), Spanish Champion (2003, 2004, 2005), Romanian Champion (2014).

== Career ==
=== Clubs ===
In November 2015 he joined Polish club PGE Skra Bełchatów for replacement because of Michał Winiarski's injury. He signed a contract until the end of 2015, which was extended to the end of the season. On February 7, 2016, he played with PGE Skra and won the 2016 Polish Cup after beating ZAKSA in the final. In April 2016 he was a member of the same team which won a bronze medal in the 2015–16 PlusLiga championship. After season he left club from Bełchatów

== Sporting achievements ==
=== Clubs ===
==== CEV Champions League ====
- 2007/2008 - with Copra Berni Piacenza

==== National championships ====
- 2002/2003 Spanish SuperCup 2002, with CV Almería
- 2002/2003 Spanish King Cup 2003, with CV Almería
- 2002/2003 Spanish Championship, with CV Almería
- 2003/2004 Spanish SuperCup 2003, with CV Almería
- 2003/2004 Spanish Championship, with CV Almería
- 2004/2005 Spanish Championship, with CV Almería
- 2006/2007 Spanish SuperCup 2006, with CV Almería
- 2006/2007 Spanish King Cup 2007, with CV Almería
- 2006/2007 Spanish Championship, with CV Almería
- 2007/2008 Italian Championship, with Copra Berni Piacenza
- 2013/2014 Romanian Cup, with Tomis Constanța
- 2013/2014 Romanian Championship, with Tomis Constanța
- 2014/2015 Turkish Championship, with Ziraat Bankası Ankara
- 2015/2016 Polish Cup, with PGE Skra Bełchatów
- 2015/2016 Polish Championship, with PGE Skra Bełchatów

=== National team ===
- 2007 European League
- 2007 CEV European Championship
- 2009 European League

=== Individually ===
- 2005 CEV European Championship - Best Spiker
- 2007 European League - Best Receiver

Awards
Preceded by (Poland) Piotr Gruszka	Best Spiker of CEV European Championship; 2005	Succeeded by (Russia) Yury Berezhko
Preceded by ?	Best Receiver of European League; 2007	Succeeded by (Germany) Ferdinand Tille
