= Juan González (volleyball) =

Spanish volleyball player (born 1994)

Personal information
- Full name: Juan Manuel González Limón
- Nationality: Spanish
- Born: 11 January 1994 (age 32); Huelva, Spain
- Height: 1.92 m (6 ft 4 in)
- Weight: 82 kg (181 lb)
- Spike: 334 cm (131 in)
- Block: 318 cm (125 in)

Volleyball information
- Position: Outside spiker
- Current club: Unicaja Almería

Career
Years	Teams
2013–2014; 2014–2015; 2015–	Calzedonia Verona; Río Duero–Soria; Unicaja Almería

National team
2014–	Spain

Juan Manuel González Limón (born 11 January 1994) is a Spanish male volleyball player. He is part of the Spain men's national volleyball team. On club level he plays for Unicaja Almería.
