= José Luis Moltó =

Spanish volleyball player (born 1975)

Personal information
- Born: 29 June 1975 (age 51) Cocentaina, Alicante, Spain
Medal record
Men's volleyball
Representing Spain
European Championships
Gold medal – first place	2007 Moscow	Team
Mediterranean Games
Silver medal – second place	2005 Almería	Team
Summer Universiade
Silver medal – second place	1995 Fukuoka	Team

José Luis Moltó Carbonell (born 29 June 1975) is a Spanish volleyball player who represented his native country at the 2000 Summer Olympics in Sydney, Australia. In 2007 he was a member of the men's national team that won the European title in Moscow, Russia.

== Sporting achievements ==
=== National team ===
- 1995 Universiade

== Individual awards ==
- 2007 European Championship "Best Blocker"
- 2007 FIVB World Cup "Best Blocker"
