= Manuel Sevillano =

Spanish volleyball player (born 1981)

Personal information
- Full name: Manuel Sevillano
- Nationality: Spanish
- Born: November 13, 1983 (age 42) Reus, Tarragona, Spain
Medal record
Men's volleyball
Representing Spain
European Championship
Gold medal – first place	2007 Moscow	Team competition

Manuel Sevillano (born July 2, 1981 in Reus, Tarragona) is a male volleyball player from Spain. Playing in different positions he was a member of the Men's National Team that claimed the gold medal at the 2007 European Championship in Moscow, Russia.
