= Carlos Mora (volleyball) =

Spanish volleyball player (born 1990)

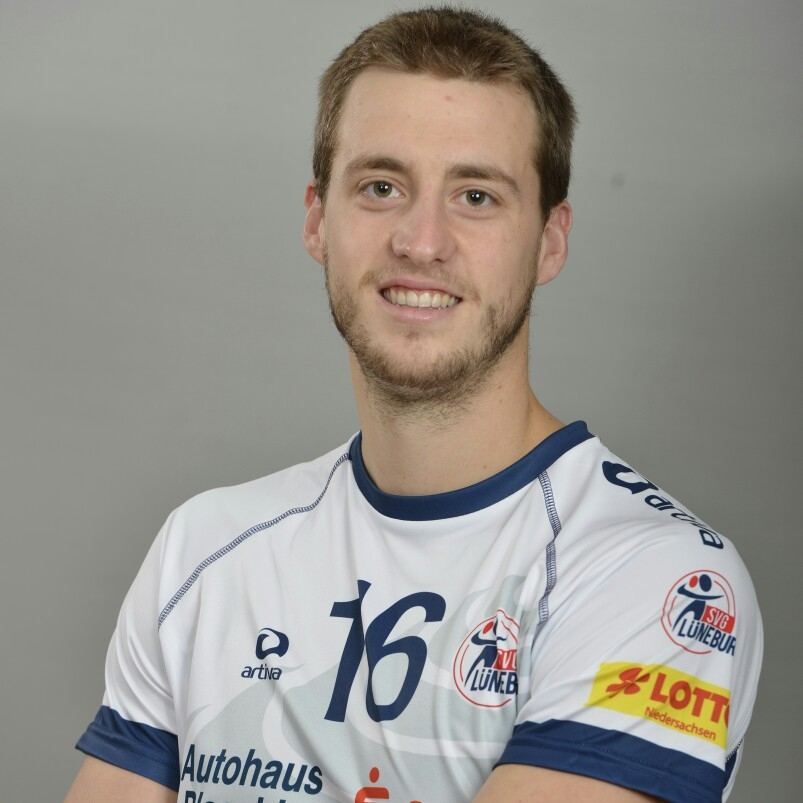
- Carlos Mora in 2016

Personal information
- Full name: Carlos Mora Sabaté
- Nationality: Spanish
- Born: 19 March 1990 (age 36)
- Height: 1.97 m (6 ft 6 in)
- Weight: 88 kg (194 lb)
- Spike: 340 cm (134 in)
- Block: 320 cm (126 in)

Volleyball information
- Number: 23 (national team)

Career
Years	Teams
2015	SVG Lüneburg

National team
2015	Spain
Medal record
Men's volleyball
Representing Spain
Mediterranean Games
Silver medal – second place	2009 Pescara	Team

Carlos Mora Sabaté (Note: In this Spanish name, the first or paternal surname is Mora and the second or maternal family name is Sabaté.) (born 19 March 1990) is a Spanish male volleyball player. He is part of the Spain men's national volleyball team. On club level he plays for SVG Lüneburg.
