= Daniel Ruiz Posadas =

Spanish volleyball player (born 1995)

Personal information
- Nationality: Spanish
- Born: 28 June 1995 (age 31)
- Height: 1.90 m (6 ft 3 in)
- Weight: 78 kg (172 lb)
- Spike: 300 cm (118 in)
- Block: 290 cm (114 in)

Volleyball information
- Position: Libero
- Current club: Guaguas
- Number: 4

Career
Years	Teams
27	Guaguas, Fénie energía Voley palma, Urbia Voley Palma, Club voleibol Teruel, Textil Santanderina, Fonte Bastardo, 7 islas vecindario, CyL Palencia

National team
Spain

Daniel Ruiz Posadas (born 28 June 1995) is a Spanish volleyball player for Guaguas and the Spanish national team.

He participated at the 2017 Men's European Volleyball Championship.
