= Miguel Ángel Fornés =

Spanish volleyball player (born 1993)

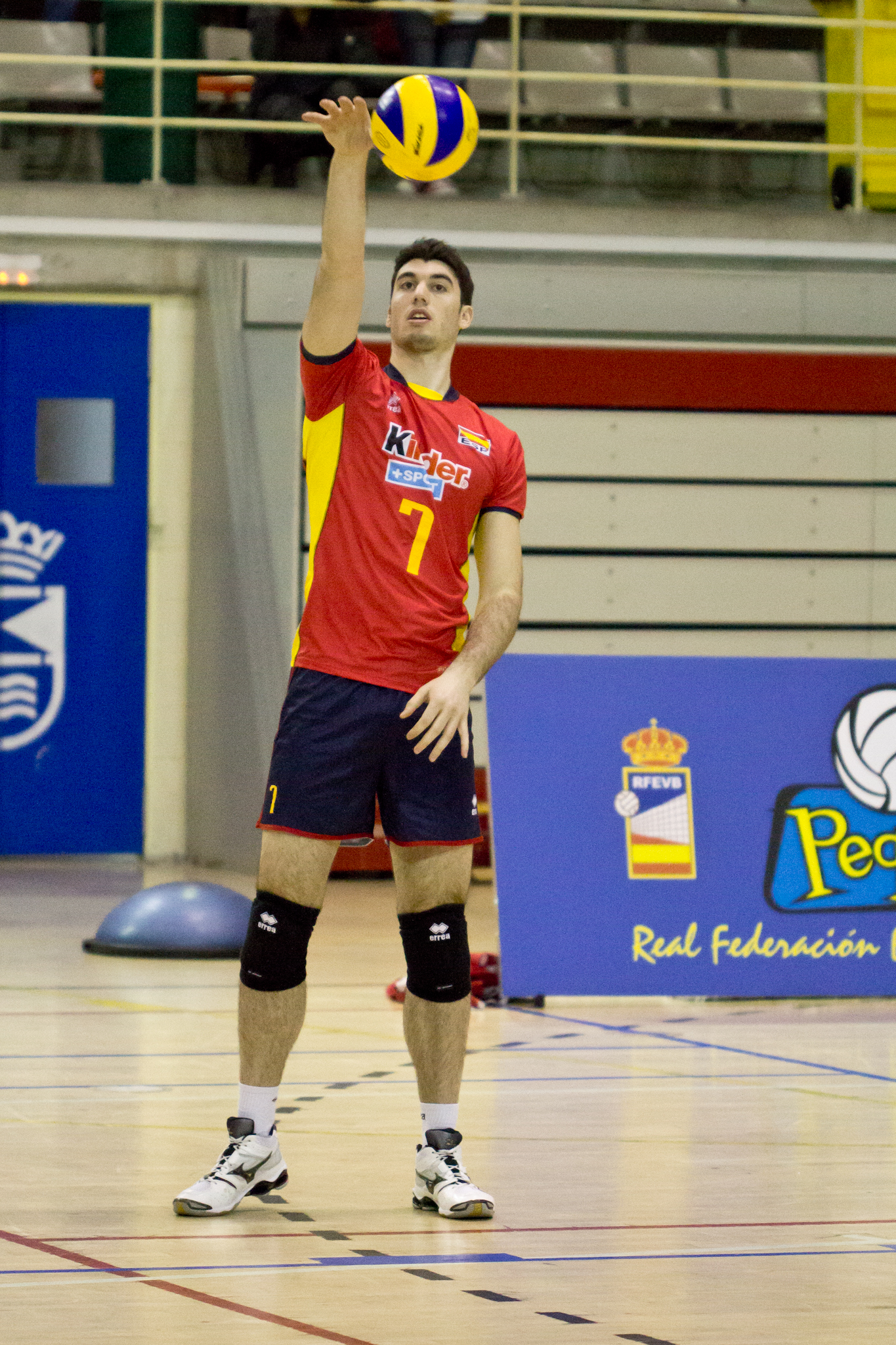

Personal information
- Nationality: Spanish
- Born: 6 September 1993 (age 33); Palma, Majorca, Spain
- Height: 2.04 m (6 ft 8 in)
- Weight: 94 kg (207 lb)
- Spike: 354 cm (139 in)
- Block: 337 cm (133 in)

Volleyball information
- Position: Middle blocker
- Current club: VC Greenyard Maaseik
- Number: 14

Career
Years	Teams
2014–2015; 2015–2016; 2016–	Unicaja Almería; Narbonne; Knack Randstad Roeselare

National team
2015–	Spain

Miguel Ángel Fornés (born 6 September 1993) is a Spanish male volleyball player. He is part of the Spain men's national volleyball team. On club level he plays for VC Greenyard Maaseik.
