= Jorge Almansa =

Spanish volleyball player (born 1991)

Personal information
- Nationality: Spanish
- Born: 17 April 1991 (age 35)
- Height: 1.95 m (6 ft 5 in)
- Weight: 85 kg (187 lb)
- Spike: 340 cm (134 in)
- Block: 330 cm (130 in)

Volleyball information
- Position: Outside spiker
- Current club: CSA Steaua București

National team
Spain

Jorge Almansa (born 17 April 1991) is a Spanish volleyball player for CSA Steaua București and the Spanish national team.

He participated at the 2017 Men's European Volleyball Championship.
