= Marcel Gromadowski =

Polish volleyball player (born 1985)

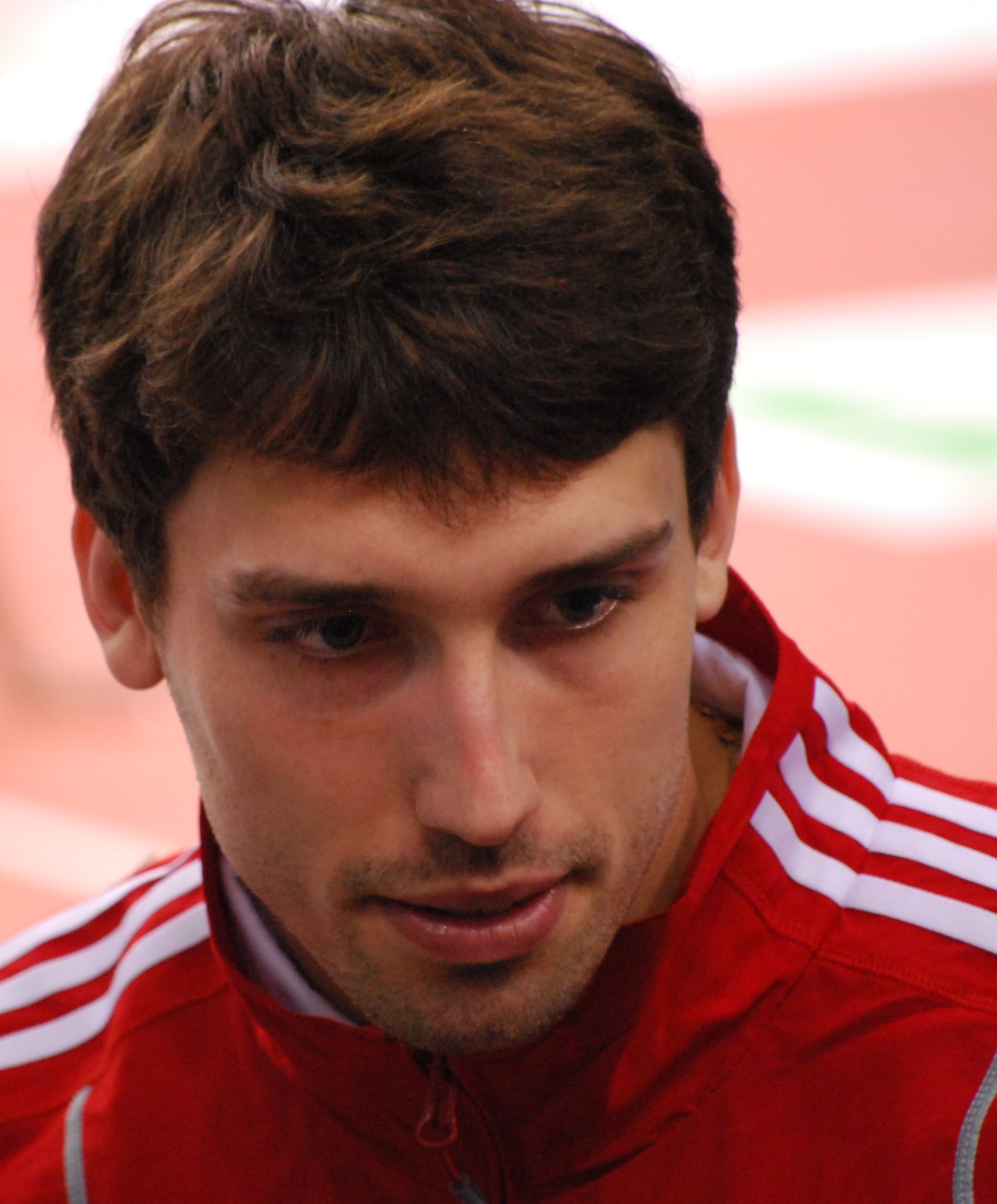

Personal information
- Full name: Marcel Adam Gromadowski
- Nationality: (Poland) Polish
- Born: 19 December 1985 (age 40); Wrocław, Poland
- Height: 2.02 m (6 ft 8 in)

Volleyball information
- Position: Opposite
- Current club: (Poland) Bielawianka Bielawa

Career
Years	Teams
2004–2007; 2007–2008; 2008–2009; 2009–2010; 2010–2011; 2011; 2011–2012; 2012–2013; 2013–2014; 2014–2015; 2015–2016; 2016–2017; 2017–2019; 2019–2020; 2020–	(Poland) Mostostal Azoty Kędzierzyn-Koźle (Italy) Volley Piacenza (Italy) Wayel Bologna (France) Paris Volley (Poland) AZS Olsztyn (Greece) Iraklis Thessaloniki (France) Montpellier UC (Turkey) 4 Eylül Belediye Sivas (Italy) Elettrosud Brolo (Poland) Cuprum Lubin (Poland) Skra Bełchatów (Poland) Łuczniczka Bydgoszcz (Czech Republic) Kladno Volejbal (Poland) Gwardia Wrocław (Poland) Bielawianka Bielawa

National team
2005–2010	Poland (25)
Honours
Men's volleyball
Representing Poland
CEV European Championship
Gold medal – first place	2009 Turkey

Marcel Adam Gromadowski (born 19 December 1985) is a Polish volleyball player, member of the Poland men's national volleyball team in 2005–2010, 2009 European Champion.

== Career ==
=== Clubs ===
After graduating from the School of Sports Championship he moved to the club from PlusLiga. He was considered "one of the best attackers of the young generation in Poland" by many coaches. He made his debut in the team Mostostal-Azoty Kędzierzyn-Koźle in 2004. In the season 2007/2008 together with his Italian club Copra Piacenza won the silver medal in the Italian Championship and was a silver medalist of the Champions League. After a game of another Italian, French and Polish club he signed a contract with the Greek GS Iraklis, but after one month he moved to French Montpellier UC. Currently, he plays to Volley Brolo since 2013. In June 2014 signed a contract with Polish club MKS Cuprum Lubin. On July 1, 2015 he signed one-year contract with PGE Skra Bełchatów. On February 7, 2016 he played with PGE Skra and won the 2016 Polish Cup after beating ZAKSA in the final. In April 2016 he was a member of the same team which won a bronze medal in the 2015–16 PlusLiga championship.

In May 2016, he signed a contract with Łuczniczka Bydgoszcz.

=== National team ===
Gromadowski was in the Polish squad when the Polish national team won the gold medal of European Championship 2009. On September 14, 2009 he was awarded Knight's Cross of Polonia Restituta.

== Sporting achievements ==
=== Clubs ===
- CEV Champions League
  - 2007/2008 – with Copra Piacenza
- National championships
  - 2007/2008 Italian Championship, with Copra Piacenza
  - 2015/2016 Polish Cup, with PGE Skra Bełchatów

=== Youth national team ===
- 2003 CEV U19 European Championship
- 2003 European Youth Olympic Festival
- 2003 FIVB U21 World Championship

=== Individual awards ===
- 2003: CEV U19 European Championship – Best Opposite

=== State awards ===
- 2009: Knight's Cross of Polonia Restituta
