= Cecilia Dujić =

Croatian volleyball player (born 1987)

Personal information
- Nationality: Croatian
- Born: 6 December 1987 (age 38)
- Height: 1.84 m (6 ft 0 in)
- Weight: 71 kg (157 lb)
- Spike: 300 cm (118 in)
- Block: 295 cm (116 in)

Volleyball information
- Position: outside hitter/opposite

Career
Years	Teams
2009-2010	ŽOK Split 1700

National team
2009-2010	Croatia
Medal record
Women's volleyball
Representing Croatia
Mediterranean Games
Bronze medal – third place	2009 Pescara	Team

Cecilia Dujić (born 6 December 1987) is a retired Croatian female volleyball player. She was part of the Croatia women's national volleyball team.

She competed at the 2009 Women's European Volleyball Championship, and at the 2010 FIVB Volleyball Women's World Championship in Japan. She played with ŽOK Split 1700.

== Clubs ==
- (Croatia) ŽOK Split 1700 (2009-2010)
