= Borja Ruiz =

Spanish volleyball player (born 1992)

Personal information
- Nationality: Spanish
- Born: 26 July 1992 (age 34)
- Height: 2.00 m (6 ft 7 in)
- Weight: 90 kg (198 lb)
- Spike: 338 cm (133 in)
- Block: 320 cm (126 in)

Volleyball information
- Position: Middle blocker
- Current club: CV GuaGuas

National team
Spain

Borja Ruiz (born 26 July 1992) is a Spanish volleyball player for CV Almería and the Spanish national team.

He participated at the 2017 Men's European Volleyball Championship.
