= 2007 Men's European Volleyball Championship =

Tournament details
- Host country: Russia
- Dates: September 6–16
- Teams: 16
- Venues: 2 (in 2 host cities)

Final positions
- Champions: Spain (1st title)

Tournament awards
- MVP: (Russia) Semyon Poltavskiy

The 25th Men's European Volleyball Championship was the first continental volleyball competition hosted by Russia. Championship took place from September 6 to September 16, 2007, and was won by Spain.

== Teams ==
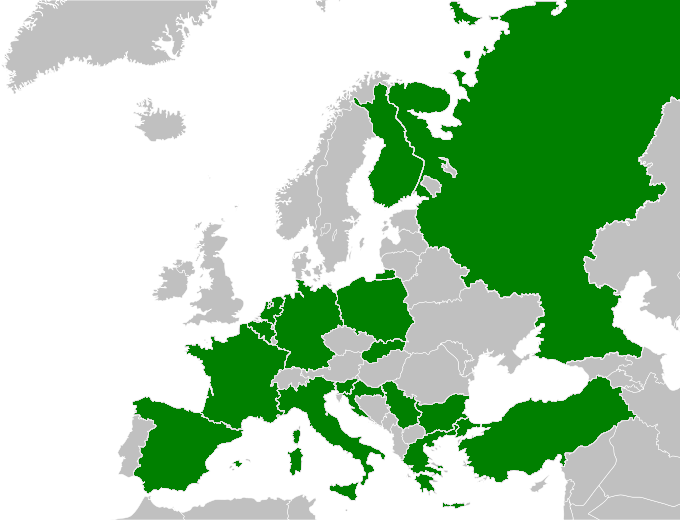
Map of qualified countries

Pool A – Saint Petersburg

- Germany
- Greece
- Netherlands
- Serbia

Pool B – Moscow

- Belgium
- Poland
- Russia
- Turkey

Pool C – Saint Petersburg

- France
- Slovakia
- Slovenia
- Spain

Pool D – Moscow

- Bulgaria
- Croatia
- Finland
- Italy

== First round ==
=== Pool A ===
- Yubileyny Sports Palace, Saint Petersburg

| Rk | Team | Points | Won | Lost | SW | SL | Ratio | PW | PL | Ratio |
|---|---|---|---|---|---|---|---|---|---|---|
| 1 | Serbia | 5 | 2 | 1 | 7 | 4 | 1.750 | 257 | 253 | 1.016 |
| 2 | Germany | 5 | 2 | 1 | 6 | 4 | 1.500 | 230 | 210 | 1.095 |
| 3 | Netherlands | 4 | 1 | 2 | 5 | 6 | 0.833 | 240 | 239 | 1.004 |
| 4 | Greece | 4 | 1 | 2 | 4 | 8 | 0.500 | 251 | 276 | 0.909 |

September 6, 2007
| 17:30 | Netherlands | Serbia | 0–3 (23–25, 21–25, 18–25) |
September 7, 2007
| 15:00 | Greece | Netherlands | 3–2 (25–20, 22–25, 19–25, 25–19, 15–13) |
| 20:00 | Serbia | Germany | 1–3 (25–22, 21–25, 20–25, 17–25) |
September 8, 2007
| 17:30 | Germany | Greece | 3–0 (25–17, 25–19, 25–15) |
September 9, 2007
| 15:00 | Germany | Netherlands | 0–3 (15–25, 24–26, 19–25) |
| 20:00 | Serbia | Greece | 3–1 (25–23, 25–23, 24–26, 25–22) |

=== Pool B ===
- Sport Complex Olympiski, Moscow

| Rk | Team | Points | Won | Lost | SW | SL | Ratio | PW | PL | Ratio |
|---|---|---|---|---|---|---|---|---|---|---|
| 1 | Russia | 6 | 3 | 0 | 9 | 0 | MAX | 225 | 173 | 1.301 |
| 2 | Belgium | 5 | 2 | 1 | 6 | 6 | 1.000 | 275 | 274 | 1.004 |
| 3 | Poland | 4 | 1 | 2 | 4 | 7 | 0.571 | 239 | 248 | 0.964 |
| 4 | Turkey | 3 | 0 | 3 | 3 | 9 | 0.333 | 243 | 287 | 0.847 |

September 6, 2007
| 17:30 | Belgium | Russia | 0–3 (17–25, 20–25, 22–25) |
September 7, 2007
| 15:00 | Poland | Belgium | 1–3 (22–25, 25–23, 14–25, 24–26) |
| 20:00 | Russia | Turkey | 3–0 (25–20, 25–17, 25–18) |
September 8, 2007
| 17:30 | Turkey | Poland | 1–3 (25–20, 18–25, 20–25, 11–25) |
September 9, 2007
| 15:00 | Turkey | Belgium | 2–3 (27–25, 25–21, 29–31, 23–25, 10–15) |
| 20:00 | Russia | Poland | 3–0 (25–22, 25–23, 25–14) |

=== Pool C ===
- Yubileyny Sports Palace, Saint Petersburg

| Rk | Team | Points | Won | Lost | SW | SL | Ratio | PW | PL | Ratio |
|---|---|---|---|---|---|---|---|---|---|---|
| 1 | Spain | 6 | 3 | 0 | 9 | 1 | 9.000 | 241 | 202 | 1.193 |
| 2 | France | 5 | 2 | 1 | 6 | 4 | 1.500 | 241 | 210 | 1.148 |
| 3 | Slovakia | 4 | 1 | 2 | 4 | 7 | 0.571 | 245 | 277 | 0.884 |
| 4 | Slovenia | 3 | 0 | 3 | 2 | 9 | 0.222 | 235 | 273 | 0.861 |

September 6, 2007
| 15:00 | Slovenia | Spain | 1–3 (25–16, 20–25, 21–25, 18–25) |
| 20:00 | Slovakia | France | 1–3 (23–25, 23–25, 26–24, 15–25) |
September 7, 2007
| 17:30 | Slovakia | Slovenia | 3–1 (21–25, 25–21, 34–32, 27–25) |
September 8, 2007
| 15:00 | Spain | Slovakia | 3–0 (25–15, 25–16, 25–20) |
| 20:00 | France | Slovenia | 3–0 (25–17, 25–18, 25–13) |
September 9, 2007
| 17:30 | Spain | France | 3–0 (25–22, 25–23, 25–22) |

=== Pool D ===
- Sport Complex Olympiski, Moscow

| Rk | Team | Points | Won | Lost | SW | SL | Ratio | PW | PL | Ratio |
|---|---|---|---|---|---|---|---|---|---|---|
| 1 | Finland | 5 | 2 | 1 | 8 | 4 | 2.000 | 284 | 269 | 1.056 |
| 2 | Bulgaria | 5 | 2 | 1 | 6 | 5 | 1.200 | 258 | 230 | 1.122 |
| 3 | Italy | 5 | 2 | 1 | 6 | 6 | 1.000 | 266 | 267 | 0.996 |
| 4 | Croatia | 3 | 0 | 3 | 4 | 9 | 0.444 | 273 | 315 | 0.867 |

September 6, 2007
| 15:00 | Croatia | Bulgaria | 2–3 (26–24, 25–23, 12–25, 20–25, 10–15) |
| 20:00 | Finland | Italy | 2–3 (21–25 18–25, 25–21, 25–22, 13–15) |
September 7, 2007
| 17:30 | Croatia | Finland | 1–3 (22–25, 26–28, 28–26, 14–25) |
September 8, 2007
| 15:00 | Bulgaria | Finland | 0–3 (22–25, 26–28, 23–25) |
| 20:00 | Italy | Croatia | 3–1 (26–24, 23–25, 25–23, 25–18) |
September 9, 2007
| 17:30 | Italy | Bulgaria | 0–3 (20–25, 18–25, 21–25) |

== Second round ==
=== Pool E ===
- Yubileyny Sports Palace, Saint Petersburg

| Rk | Team | Points | Won | Lost | SW | SL | Ratio | PW | PL | Ratio |
|---|---|---|---|---|---|---|---|---|---|---|
| 1 | Spain | 10 | 5 | 0 | 15 | 4 | 3.750 | 449 | 406 | 1.106 |
| 2 | Serbia | 8 | 3 | 2 | 12 | 8 | 1.500 | 457 | 453 | 1.009 |
| 3 | Germany | 8 | 3 | 2 | 10 | 7 | 1.429 | 397 | 362 | 1.097 |
| 4 | Netherlands | 8 | 3 | 2 | 10 | 9 | 1.111 | 438 | 412 | 1.063 |
| 5 | France | 6 | 1 | 4 | 7 | 13 | 0.538 | 437 | 463 | 0.944 |
| 6 | Slovakia | 5 | 0 | 5 | 2 | 15 | 0.133 | 344 | 426 | 0.808 |

September 11, 2007
| 15:00 | Netherlands | Spain | 1–3 (23–25, 25–20, 22–25, 22–25) |
| 17:30 | Serbia | France | 3–2 (25–23, 22–25, 25–23, 33–35, 15–12) |
| 20:00 | Germany | Slovakia | 3–0 (25–23, 25–15, 25–16) |
September 12, 2007
| 15:00 | Netherlands | France | 3–2 (25–11, 25–23, 21–25, 20–25, 15–12) |
| 17:30 | Germany | Spain | 1–3 (19–25, 25–15, 24–26, 24–26) |
| 20:00 | Serbia | Slovakia | 3–0 (25–18, 25–23, 25–23) |
September 13, 2007
| 15:00 | Germany | France | 3–0 (25–14, 25–22, 25–21) |
| 17:30 | Serbia | Spain | 2–3 (24–26, 19–25, 26–24, 25–22, 10–15) |
| 20:00 | Netherlands | Slovakia | 3–1 (30–28, 22–25, 25–18, 25–17) |

=== Pool F ===
- Sport Complex Olympiski, Moscow

| Rk | Team | Points | Won | Lost | SW | SL | Ratio | PW | PL | Ratio |
|---|---|---|---|---|---|---|---|---|---|---|
| 1 | Russia | 10 | 5 | 0 | 15 | 4 | 3.750 | 441 | 375 | 1.176 |
| 2 | Finland | 8 | 3 | 2 | 13 | 7 | 1.857 | 455 | 445 | 1.022 |
| 3 | Italy | 8 | 3 | 2 | 11 | 10 | 1.100 | 449 | 455 | 0.987 |
| 4 | Bulgaria | 8 | 3 | 2 | 9 | 9 | 1.000 | 407 | 407 | 1.000 |
| 5 | Belgium | 6 | 1 | 4 | 5 | 13 | 0.385 | 398 | 428 | 0.930 |
| 6 | Poland | 5 | 0 | 5 | 5 | 15 | 0.333 | 427 | 467 | 0.914 |

September 11, 2007
| 15:00 | Poland | Finland | 0–3 (20–25, 27–29, 21–25) |
| 17:30 | Belgium | Italy | 0–3 (22–25, 21–25, 23–25) |
| 20:00 | Russia | Bulgaria | 3–0 (25–22, 25–18, 25–21) |
September 12, 2007
| 15:00 | Belgium | Finland | 1–3 (25–21, 17–25, 23–25, 21–25) |
| 17:30 | Poland | Bulgaria | 2–3 (20–25, 25–16, 24–26, 25–21, 13–15) |
| 20:00 | Russia | Italy | 3–2 (25–21, 25–15, 20–25, 19–25, 15–10) |
September 13, 2007
| 15:00 | Belgium | Bulgaria | 1–3 (25–22, 23–25, 23–25, 17–25) |
| 17:30 | Poland | Italy | 2–3 (23–25, 23–25, 28–26, 25–20, 9–15) |
| 20:00 | Russia | Finland | 3–2 (22–25, 28–26, 22–25, 25–16, 15–8) |

== Semifinals and finals ==
Semifinals
2007-09-15 - Moscow
Spain | 3
Finland | 2
2007-09-15 - Moscow
Russia | 3
Serbia | 0

Final
2007-09-16 - Moscow
Spain | 3
Russia | 2
3rd place
2007-09-16 - Moscow
Finland | 1
Serbia | 3

=== Semifinals ===
September 15, 2007 Sport Complex Olympiski, Moscow
| 17:30 | Spain | Finland | 3–2 (25–23, 19–25, 22–25, 26–24, 15–10) |
| 20:00 | Russia | Serbia | 3–0 (27–25, 25–22, 25–15) |

=== Finals ===
September 16, 2007 Sport Complex Olympiski, Moscow
| 15:30 | Finland | Serbia | 1–3 (18–25, 25–23, 21–25, 16–25) |
| 18:00 | Spain | Russia | 3–2 (25–18, 20–25, 24–26, 30–28, 16–14) |

== Ranking and statistics ==
=== Final ranking ===
| Place | Team |
|---|---|
| Gold medal | Spain |
| Silver medal | Russia |
| Bronze medal | Serbia |
| 4 | Finland |
| 5 | Germany |
| 6 | Italy |
| 7 | Netherlands |
| 8 | Bulgaria |
| 9 | France |
| 10 | Belgium |
| 11 | Poland |
| 12 | Slovakia |
| 13 | Greece |
| 14 | Croatia |
| 15 | Turkey |
| 16 | Slovenia |

2007 Men's European champions

Spain
First title

Team roster

Rafael Pascual, Ibán Pérez, José Luis Lobato, Manuel Sevillano, Guillermo Hernán, Miguel Ángel Falasca, Javier Subiela, Guillermo Falasca, José Luis Moltó, Julián García-Torres, Enrique de la Fuente, Israel Rodríguez.
Head coach: Andrea Anastasi.

=== Individual awards ===
- MVP: Semen Poltavskiy (RUS)
- Best scorer: Ivan Miljković (SRB)
- Best spiker: Yury Berezhko (RUS)
- Best blocker: José Luis Moltó (ESP)
- Best server: Semen Poltavskiy (RUS)
- Best libero: Alexey Verbov (RUS)
- Best setter: Vadim Khamuttskikh (RUS)
