= Francisco Iribarne =

Spanish volleyball player (born 1998)

Personal information
- Nationality: Spanish
- Born: 13 June 1998 (age 28)
- Height: 2.01 m (6 ft 7 in)
- Weight: 91 kg (201 lb)
- Spike: 336 cm (132 in)
- Block: 320 cm (126 in)

Volleyball information
- Position: Outside spiker
- Current club: Unicaja Almería Voleibol

National team
| Spain |

Francisco Javier Iribarne Fernandez (born 13 July 1998) is a Spanish volleyball player for Unicaja Almería Voleibol and the Spanish national team.

He participated at the 2017 Men's European Volleyball Championship.
