= Spain men's national volleyball team =

Men's national volleyball team representing Spain

Spain
- Association: Real Federación Española de Voleibol (RFEVB)
- Confederation: CEV
- Head coach: Hubert Henno
- FIVB ranking: 36 (15 October 2026)

Uniforms
Home	Away	Third

Summer Olympics
- Appearances: 2 (First in 1992)
- Best result: 8th (1992)

World Championship
- Appearances: 3 (First in 1998)
- Best result: 8th (1998)

World Cup
- Appearances: 2 (First in 1999)
- Best result: 5th (2007)

European Championship
- Appearances: 12 (First in 1981)
- Best result: (gold) (2007)
- www.rfevb.com (in Spanish)

Spain men's national volleyball team
Medal record

European Championship
Gold medal – first place	2007 Moscow	

European League
Gold medal – first place	2007 Portimão	
Silver medal – second place	2009 Portimão	
Silver medal – second place	2010 Guadalajara	
Silver medal – second place	2011 Košice	
Bronze medal – third place	2005 Kazan	
Bronze medal – third place	2012 Ankara	

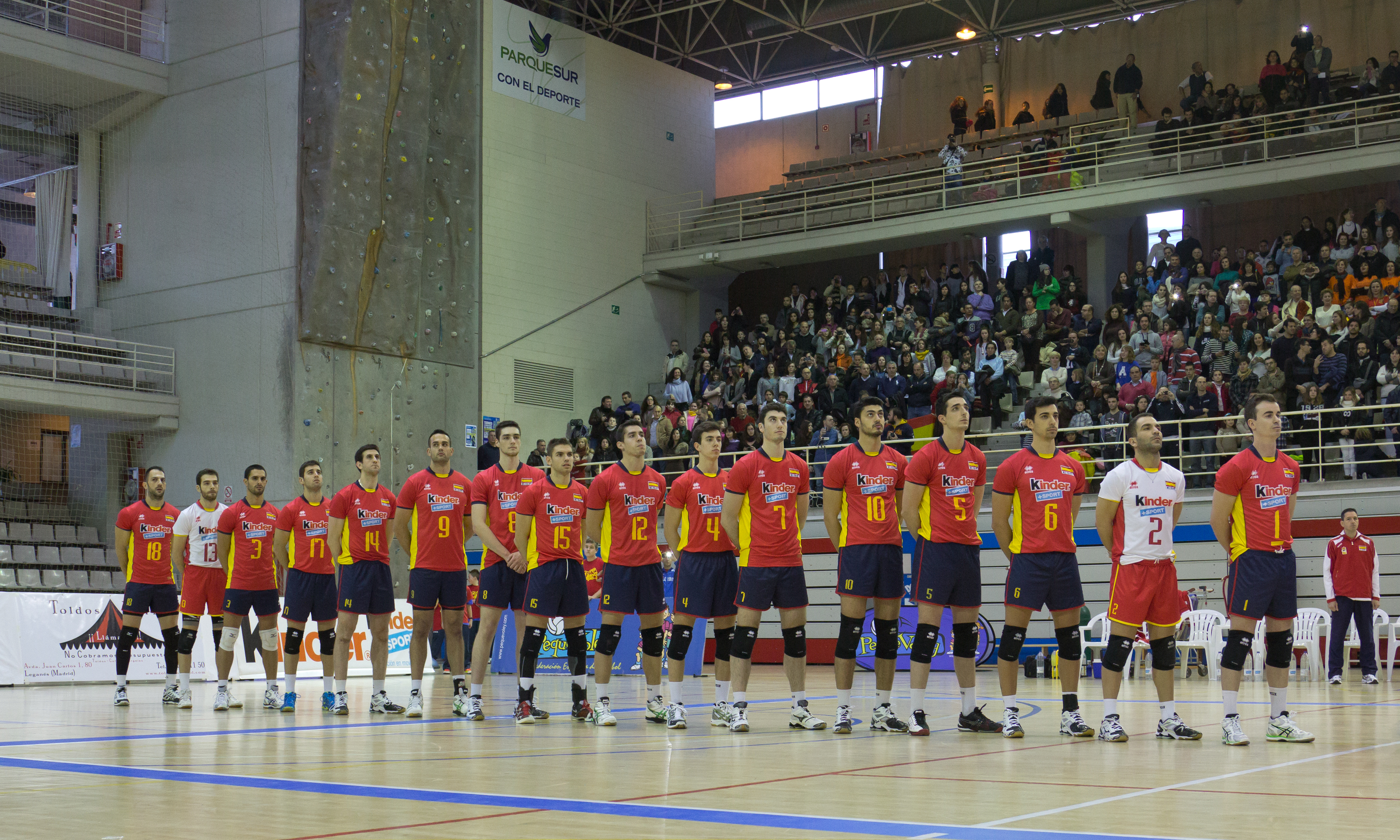
Spain men's national volleyball team in late 2013.

The Spain men's national volleyball team is the national team of Spain. The team in 2007 won the European Championship, which is the most notable result achieved by the team to date.

== Results ==
=== Olympic Games ===
Year	Position	Pld	W	L
(Spain) 1992	8th place	8	3	5
(Australia) 2000	9th place	5	1	4

=== World Championship ===
Year	Position	Pld	W	L
(Japan) 1998	8th place	12	7	5
(Argentina) 2002	13th place	6	2	4
(Italy) 2010	12th place	9	3	6

=== World Cup ===
Year	Position	Pld	W	L
(Japan) 1999	6th place	11	7	4
(Japan) 2007	5th place	11	7	4

=== European Championship ===
Year	Position	Pld	W	L
(Bulgaria) 1981	12th place	7	1	6
(Netherlands) 1985	12th place	7	0	7
(Belgium) 1987	12th place	7	0	7
(Finland) 1993	11th place	5	0	5
(Germany) 2003	8th place	7	2	5
(Italy) (Serbia and Montenegro) 2005	4th place	7	3	4
(Russia) 2007	(gold) Gold medal	8	8	0
(Turkey) 2009	9th place	6	2	4
(Poland) 2017	16th place	3	0	3
(France) (Slovenia) (Belgium) (Netherlands) 2019	15th place	6	2	4
(Czech Republic) (Finland) (Estonia) (Poland) 2021	20th place	5	1	4
(Italy) (Bulgaria) (North Macedonia) (Israel) 2023	17th place	5	2	3
(Italy) (Bulgaria) (Finland) (Romania) 2026	Did not qualify			
(Montenegro) 2028	To be determined			

=== World League ===
Year	Position	Pld	W	L
(Japan) 1990	did not qualify			
(Italy) 1991	did not qualify			
(Italy) 1992	did not qualify			
(Brazil) 1993	did not qualify			
(Italy) 1994	did not qualify			
(Brazil) 1995	7th place	12	6	6
(Netherlands) 1996	10th place	12	4	8
(Russia) 1997	9th place	12	4	8
(Italy) 1998	8th place	15	5	10
(Argentina) 1999	5th place	14	7	7
(Netherlands) 2000	11th place	12	1	11
(Poland) 2001	9th place	12	5	7
(Brazil) 2002	5th place	15	9	6
(Spain) 2003	5th place	15	6	9
(Italy) 2004	7th place	12	4	8
(Serbia and Montenegro) 2005	did not qualify			
(Russia) 2006	did not qualify			
(Poland) 2007	did not qualify			
(Brazil) 2008	13th place	12	3	9
(Serbia) 2009	did not qualify			
(Argentina) 2010	did not qualify			
(Poland) 2011	did not qualify			
(Poland) 2012	did not qualify			
(Argentina) 2013	did not qualify			
(Italy) 2014	25th place	6	2	4
(Brazil) 2015	25th place	6	5	1
(Poland) 2016	32nd place	6	3	3
(Brazil) 2017	26th place	8	6	2

=== European League ===
Year	Position	Pld	W	L
(Russia) 2005	(bronze) Bronze medal	14	8	6
(Turkey) 2006	6th place	12	6	6
(Portugal) 2007	(gold) Gold medal	14	10	4
(Portugal) 2009	(silver) Silver medal	14	13	1
(Spain) 2010	(silver) Silver medal	14	10	4
(Slovakia) 2011	(silver) Silver medal	14	11	3
(Turkey) 2012	(bronze) Bronze medal	14	12	2
(Turkey) 2013	6th place	12	6	6
(Czech Republic) 2018	9th place	6	2	4
(Estonia) 2019	5th place	6	3	3
(Belgium) 2021	7th place	6	2	4
(Croatia) 2022	7th place	6	2	4
(Croatia) 2024	6th place	6	3	3
(Czech Republic) 2025	6th place	6	4	2
(Finland) (Netherlands) 2026	10th place	6	4	2

=== Mediterranean Games ===
- 1975 — 7th place
- 1979 — 6th place
- 1983 — 6th place
- 1987 — (gold) Gold medal
- 1991 — (bronze) Bronze medal
- 1993 — (silver) Silver medal
- 2001 — 5th place
- 2005 — (silver) Silver medal
- 2009 — (silver) Silver medal
- 2013 — did not participate
- 2018 — (silver) Silver medal
- 2022 — (silver) Silver medal

== Current squad ==
The following is the Spanish roster in the 2017 Men's European Volleyball Championship.

Head coach:	Fernando Muñoz
Assistants:	Miguel Rivera, Jorge Rodriguez, Juan José Susin

No.	Name	Date of birth	Height	Weight	Spike	Block	2016/17 club
1	Andrés Villena	February 27, 1993	1.94 m (6 ft 4 in)	88 kg (194 lb)	356 cm (140 in)	330 cm (130 in)	(Spain) Ca'n Ventura Palma
2	Ángel Trinidad	March 27, 1993	1.95 m (6 ft 5 in)	78 kg (172 lb)	342 cm (135 in)	318 cm (125 in)	(Belgium) Knack Randstad Roeselare
3	Sergio Noda	March 23, 1987	1.91 m (6 ft 3 in)	87 kg (192 lb)	338 cm (133 in)	325 cm (128 in)	(Italy) Emma Villas Siena
5	Alejandro Vigil	February 11, 1993	2.04 m (6 ft 8 in)	89 kg (196 lb)	348 cm (137 in)	330 cm (130 in)	(Belgium) Noliko Maaseik
6	Borja Ruiz	July 26, 1992	2.00 m (6 ft 7 in)	87 kg (192 lb)	340 cm (130 in)	330 cm (130 in)	(Spain) Unicaja Almería
7	Jorge Almansa	April 17, 1991	1.95 m (6 ft 5 in)	81 kg (179 lb)	338 cm (133 in)	325 cm (128 in)	(Romania) Steaua București
10	Jorge Fernández (C)	May 4, 1989	2.01 m (6 ft 7 in)	90 kg (200 lb)	345 cm (136 in)	325 cm (128 in)	(Spain) Ca'n Ventura Palma
11	Miguel Ángel de Amo	September 16, 1985	1.85 m (6 ft 1 in)	79 kg (174 lb)	342 cm (135 in)	320 cm (130 in)	(Spain) Unicaja Almería
13	Daniel Ruiz Posadas	June 28, 1995	1.90 m (6 ft 3 in)	82 kg (181 lb)	305 cm (120 in)	190 cm (75 in)	(Spain) Vecindario ACEGC
14	Miguel Ángel Fornés	September 6, 1993	2.02 m (6 ft 8 in)	94 kg (207 lb)	354 cm (139 in)	339 cm (133 in)	(Belgium) Knack Randstad Roeselare
15	Francisco Iribarne	July 13, 1998	1.99 m (6 ft 6 in)	91 kg (201 lb)	336 cm (132 in)	328 cm (129 in)	(Spain) Melilla
17	Francisco Ruiz	June 7, 1991	1.78 m (5 ft 10 in)	70 kg (150 lb)	334 cm (131 in)	310 cm (120 in)	(Spain) Ca'n Ventura Palma
18	Juan González	January 11, 1994	1.92 m (6 ft 4 in)	83 kg (183 lb)	334 cm (131 in)	315 cm (124 in)	(Spain) Unicaja Almería
25	Augusto Colito	January 23, 1997	1.90 m (6 ft 3 in)	81 kg (179 lb)	345 cm (136 in)	330 cm (130 in)	(Spain) C.V. L'Illa-Grau
