= Radobica =

- Municipality
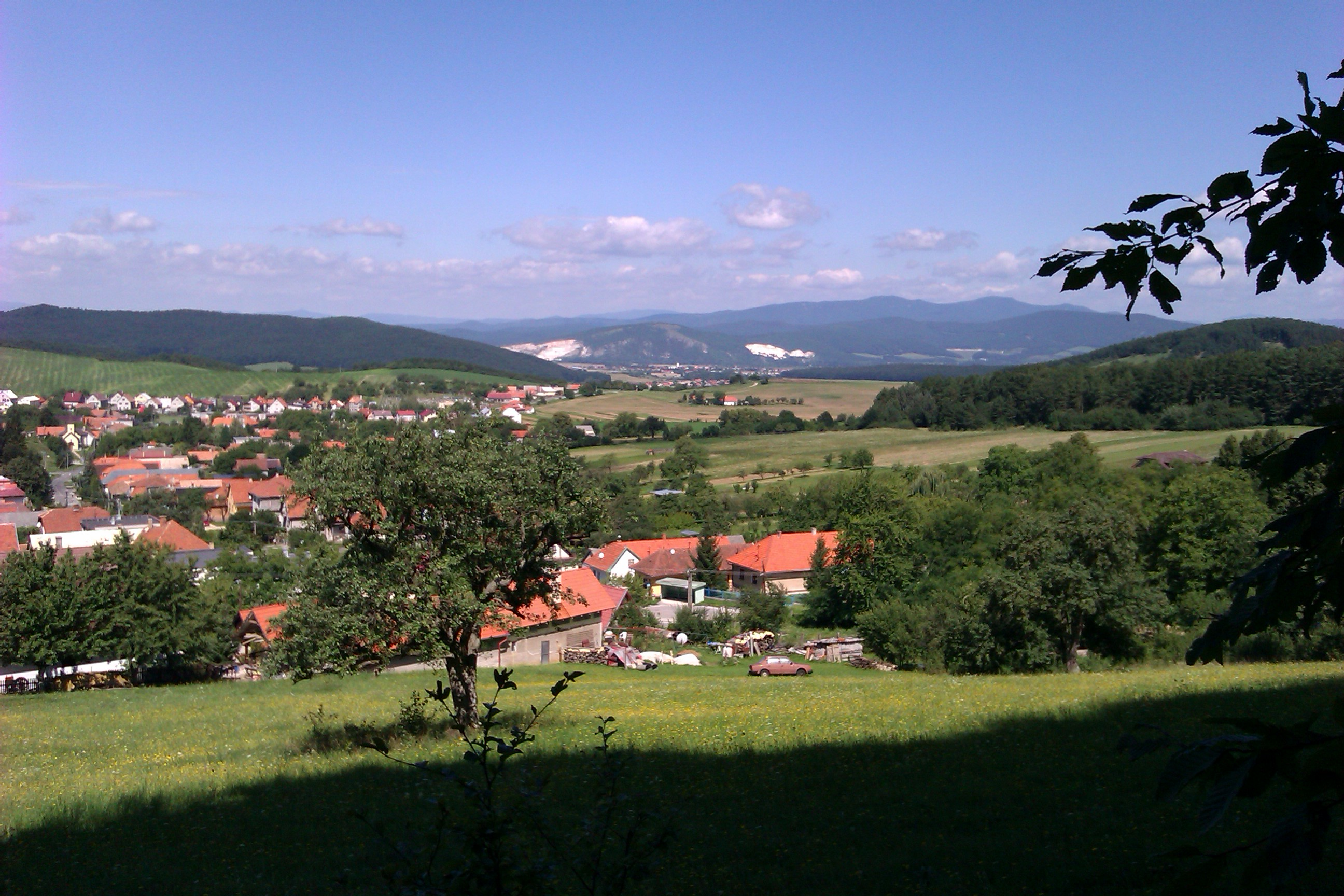

- Flag

- Location of Radobica in the Trenčín Region Location of Radobica in Slovakia
- Coordinates: 48.58°N 18.50°E
- Country: Slovakia
- Region: Trenčín Region
- District: Prievidza District
- First mentioned: 1324

Area
  - Total: 11.45 km^{2} (4.42 sq mi)
- Elevation: 435 m (1,427 ft)

Population (2025)
  - Total: 571
- Time zone: UTC+1 (CET)
  - Summer (DST): UTC+2 (CEST)
- Postal code: 972 47
- Area code: +421 46
- Vehicle registration plate (until 2022): PD
- Website: www.radobica.sk

Radobica (Hungarian: Radóc) is a village and municipality in Prievidza District in the Trenčín Region of western Slovakia.

== History ==
In historical records the village was first mentioned in 1324.

== Geography ==
The municipality lies at an altitude of 435 metres (1,427 ft) and covers an area of 11.45 km^{2} (4.42 sq mi) (2025).

== Population ==
Population statistic (10 years)
Year	1995	2005	2015	2025
Count	623	573	546	571
Difference		−8.02%	−4.71%	+4.57%

Population statistic
Year	2024	2025
Count	574	571
Difference		−0.52%

It has a population of 571 people (31 December 2025).

=== Ethnicity ===
Census 2021 (1+ %)
Ethnicity	Number	Fraction
Slovak	543	98.36%
Not found out	6	1.08%
Total	552	

In year 2021 was 552 people by ethnicity 543 as Slovak, 6 as Not found out, 3 as German, 2 as Czech, 1 as Hungarian and 1 as Other.

Note on population: The difference values of population numbers in the table "Population statistic" and in the sections "Ethnicity" & "Religion" is caused by the use of various statistical methods.

=== Religion ===
Census 2021 (1+ %)
Religion	Number	Fraction
Roman Catholic Church	397	71.92%
None	119	21.56%
Not found out	13	2.36%
Total	552	

In year 2021 was 552 people by religion 397 from Roman Catholic Church, 119 from None, 13 from Not found out, 5 from Greek Catholic Church, 4 from Other and not ascertained christian church, 4 from Christian Congregations in Slovakia, 4 from Ad hoc movements, 3 from Hinduism, 2 from Evangelical Church and 1 from Buddhism.
