= Diviaky nad Nitricou =

- Municipality
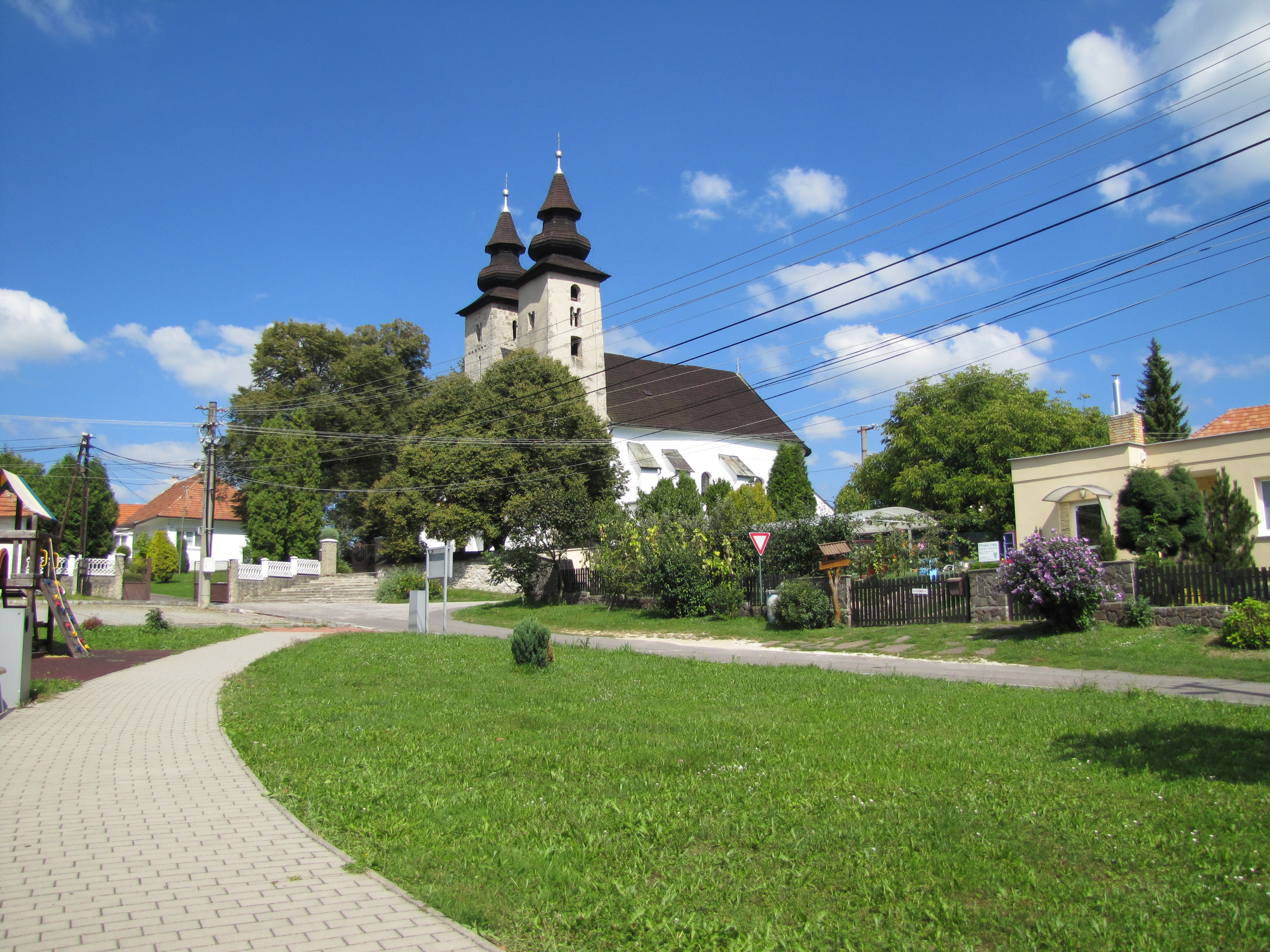

- Flag

- Location of Diviaky nad Nitricou in the Trenčín Region Location of Diviaky nad Nitricou in Slovakia
- Coordinates: 48.77°N 18.50°E
- Country: Slovakia
- Region: Trenčín Region
- District: Prievidza District
- First mentioned: 1246

Area
  - Total: 19.85 km^{2} (7.66 sq mi)
- Elevation: 290 m (950 ft)

Population (2025)
  - Total: 1,761
- Time zone: UTC+1 (CET)
  - Summer (DST): UTC+2 (CEST)
- Postal code: 972 25
- Area code: +421 46
- Vehicle registration plate (until 2022): PD
- Website: diviaky.sk

Diviaky nad Nitrou (Hungarian: Nyitradivék) is a village and municipality in Prievidza District in the Trenčín Region of western Slovakia.

== History ==
In historical records the village was first mentioned in 1210.

== Geography ==
The municipality lies at an altitude of 290 metres (950 ft) and covers an area of 19.85 km^{2} (7.66 sq mi) (2025).

== Population ==
Population statistic (10 years)
Year	1995	2005	2015	2025
Count	1752	1810	1761	1761
Difference		+3.31%	−2.70%	+0%

Population statistic
Year	2024	2025
Count	1760	1761
Difference		+0.05%

It has a population of 1761 people (31 December 2025).

=== Ethnicity ===
Census 2021 (1+ %)
Ethnicity	Number	Fraction
Slovak	1726	98.01%
Not found out	31	1.76%
Total	1761	

In year 2021 was 1761 people by ethnicity 1726 as Slovak, 31 as Not found out, 9 as Czech, 4 as Other, 2 as Ukrainian, 2 as Austrian, 2 as Polish, 2 as Hungarian, 1 as Russian, 1 as German and 1 as English.

Note on population: The difference values of population numbers in the table "Population statistic" and in the sections "Ethnicity" & "Religion" is caused by the use of various statistical methods.

=== Religion ===
Census 2021 (1+ %)
Religion	Number	Fraction
Roman Catholic Church	1303	73.99%
None	344	19.53%
Not found out	53	3.01%
Total	1761	

In year 2021 was 1761 people by religion 1303 from Roman Catholic Church, 344 from None, 53 from Not found out, 13 from Christian Congregations in Slovakia, 12 from Evangelical Church, 10 from Greek Catholic Church, 9 from Other and not ascertained christian church, 4 from Ad hoc movements, 3 from Calvinist Church, 3 from Other, 2 from Paganism and natural spirituality, 2 from Buddhism, 1 from Eastern Orthodox Church, 1 from United Methodist Church and 1 from Apostolic Church.

== Genealogical resources ==
The records for genealogical research are available at the state archive "Statny Archiv in Nitra, Slovakia"

- Roman Catholic church records (births/marriages/deaths): 1696-1896 (parish A)

== See also ==
- List of municipalities and towns in Slovakia
