= Sebedražie =

- Municipality
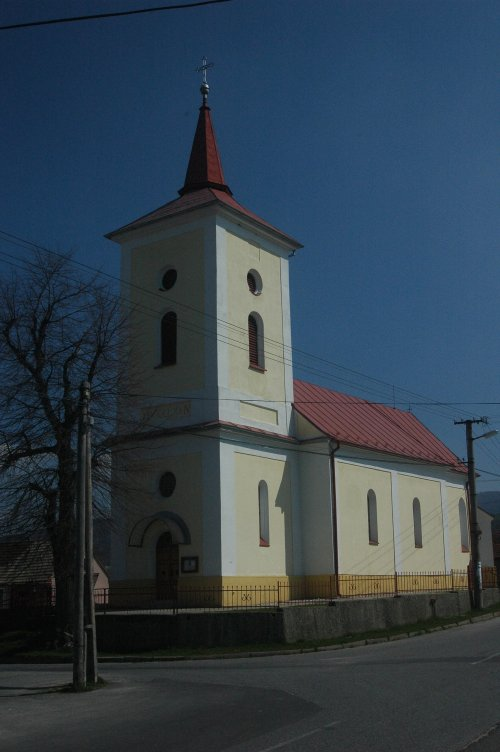

- Flag

- Location of Sebedražie in the Trenčín Region Location of Sebedražie in Slovakia
- Coordinates: 48.72°N 18.63°E
- Country: Slovakia
- Region: Trenčín Region
- District: Prievidza District
- First mentioned: 1245

Area
  - Total: 8.43 km^{2} (3.25 sq mi)
- Elevation: 335 m (1,099 ft)

Population (2025)
  - Total: 1,663
- Time zone: UTC+1 (CET)
  - Summer (DST): UTC+2 (CEST)
- Postal code: 972 05
- Area code: +421 46
- Vehicle registration plate (until 2022): PD
- Website: www.sebedrazie.sk

Sebedražie (Hungarian: Szebed) is a village and municipality in Prievidza District in the Trenčín Region of western Slovakia.

== History ==
In historical records the village was first mentioned in 1245. The village is also known as džungoro.

== Geography ==
The municipality lies at an altitude of 335 metres (1,099 ft) and covers an area of 8.43 km^{2} (3.25 sq mi) (2025).

== Population ==
Population statistic (10 years)
| Year | 1995 | 2005 | 2015 | 2025 |
|---|---|---|---|---|
| Count | 1679 | 1733 | 1771 | 1663 |
| Difference | | +3.21% | +2.19% | −6.09% |

Population statistic
| Year | 2024 | 2025 |
|---|---|---|
| Count | 1666 | 1663 |
| Difference | | −0.18% |

It has a population of 1663 people (31 December 2025).

=== Ethnicity ===
Census 2021 (1+ %)
| Ethnicity | Number | Fraction |
|---|---|---|
| Slovak | 1659 | 96.73% |
| Not found out | 47 | 2.74% |
| Total | 1715 | |

In year 2021 was 1715 people by ethnicity 1659 as Slovak, 47 as Not found out, 10 as Other, 9 as Czech, 3 as Italian, 3 as Hungarian, 2 as Russian, 2 as English, 1 as Rusyn, 1 as Austrian, 1 as German, 1 as Greek, 1 as Croatian and 1 as Bulgarian.

Note on population: The difference values of population numbers in the table "Population statistic" and in the sections "Ethnicity" & "Religion" is caused by the use of various statistical methods.

=== Religion ===
Census 2021 (1+ %)
| Religion | Number | Fraction |
|---|---|---|
| Roman Catholic Church | 1093 | 63.73% |
| None | 505 | 29.45% |
| Not found out | 49 | 2.86% |
| Christian Congregations in Slovakia | 30 | 1.75% |
| Evangelical Church | 18 | 1.05% |
| Total | 1715 | |

In year 2021 was 1715 people by religion 1093 from Roman Catholic Church, 505 from None, 49 from Not found out, 30 from Christian Congregations in Slovakia, 18 from Evangelical Church, 6 from Ad hoc movements, 3 from Buddhism, 2 from Eastern Orthodox Church, 2 from Paganism and natural spirituality, 2 from Other, 1 from Jewish community, 1 from Calvinist Church, 1 from Other and not ascertained christian church, 1 from Jehovah's Witnesses and 1 from Greek Catholic Church.
