= Prievidza District =

Coordinates: 48°46′23″N 18°37′20″E

- District
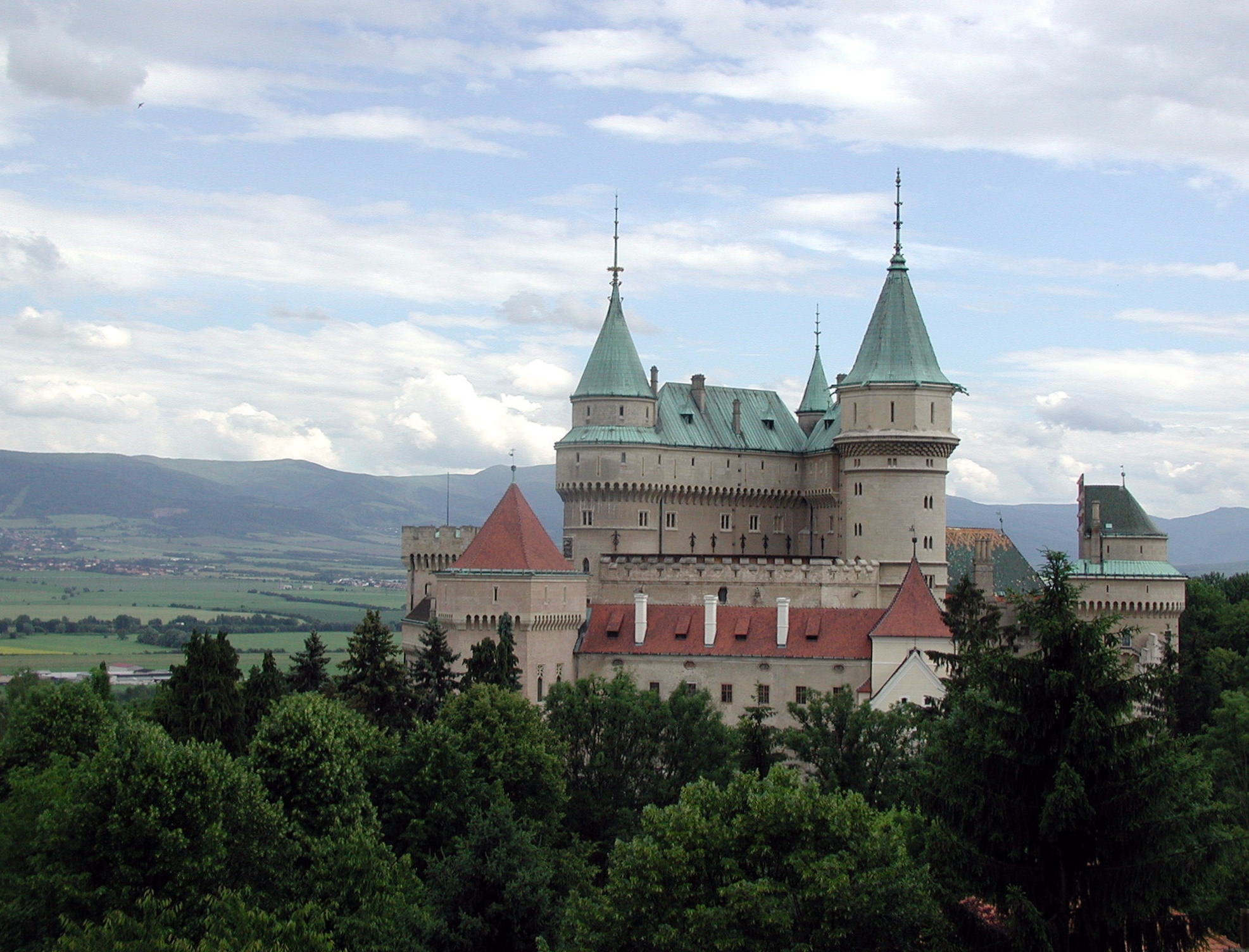
- Country: Slovakia
- Region (kraj): Trenčín Region
- Seat: Prievidza

Area
  - Total: 959.86 km^{2} (370.60 sq mi)

Population (2025)
  - Total: 126,771
- Time zone: UTC+1 (CET)
  - Summer (DST): UTC+2 (CEST)
- Telephone prefix: 046
- Vehicle registration plate (until 2022): PD
- Municipalities: 52

Prievidza District (Slovak: okres Prievidza, Hungarian: Privigyei járás) is a district in the Trenčín Region of western Slovakia. Until 1918, the district was mostly part of the county of Kingdom of Hungary of Nyitra, apart from a small area in the southeast around Handlová which formed part of the county of Bars.

== Population ==
Population statistic (10 years)
Year	1995	2005	2015	2025
Count	141,184	139,238	135,967	126,771
Difference		−1.37%	−2.34%	−6.76%

Population statistic
Year	2024	2025
Count	127,650	126,771
Difference		−0.68%

It has a population of 126,771 people (31 December 2025).

Historical population
Year	Pop.	±%
1970	114,598	—
1980	128,621	+12.2%
1991	138,537	+7.7%
2001	140,444	+1.4%
2011	137,894	−1.8%
2021	131,693	−4.5%
Source: Statistical Office of the Slovak Republic

=== Ethnicity ===
Census 2021 (1+ %)
Ethnicity	Number	Fraction
Slovak	122,997	91.67%
Not found out	7702	5.74%
Total	134,165	

In year 2021 was 134,165 people by ethnicity 122,997 as Slovak, 7702 as Not found out, 932 as Czech, 467 as German, 419 as Other, 406 as Hungarian, 306 as Romani, 203 as Russian, 92 as Ukrainian, 86 as Polish, 85 as Rusyn, 60 as Italian, 52 as Vietnamese, 42 as English, 35 as Moravian, 32 as Austrian, 31 as Irish, 31 as Romanian, 28 as Croatian, 27 as Chinese, 25 as Serbian, 21 as Jewish, 18 as Greek, 18 as Bulgarian, 13 as Albanian, 10 as Canadian, 9 as Turkish, 9 as French, 8 as Silesian and 1 as Korean.

Note on population: The difference values of population numbers in the table "Population statistic" and in the sections "Ethnicity" & "Religion" is caused by the use of various statistical methods.

=== Religion ===
Census 2021 (1+ %)
Religion	Number	Fraction
Roman Catholic Church	69,398	52.7%
None	47,594	36.14%
Not found out	9078	6.89%
Evangelical Church	1608	1.22%
Total	131,693	

In year 2021 was 131,693 people by religion 69,398 from Roman Catholic Church, 47,594 from None, 9078 from Not found out, 1608 from Evangelical Church, 764 from Christian Congregations in Slovakia, 709 from Greek Catholic Church, 476 from Ad hoc movements, 420 from Other, 371 from Jehovah's Witnesses, 285 from Other and not ascertained christian church, 186 from Buddhism, 174 from Eastern Orthodox Church, 168 from Calvinist Church, 140 from Paganism and natural spirituality, 69 from Islam, 43 from Seventh-day Adventist Church, 40 from Hinduism, 39 from United Methodist Church, 33 from Old Catholic Church, 25 from Apostolic Church, 21 from Baptists Church, 20 from Jewish community, 9 from Czechoslovak Hussite Church, 9 from Church of Jesus Christ of Latter-day Saints, 7 from Church of the Brethren, 5 from Bahá'i Community and 2 from New Apostolic Church.

== Municipalities ==
Municipality	Area [km^{2}]	Population
Bojnice	19.92	5,049
Bystričany	37.63	1,724
Cigeľ	17.34	1,283
Čavoj	15.24	492
Čereňany	18.97	1,757
Diviacka Nová Ves	13.36	1,752
Diviaky nad Nitricou	19.85	1,761
Dlžín	6.65	142
Dolné Vestenice	13.83	2,346
Handlová	85.55	15,289
Horná Ves	18.56	1,097
Horné Vestenice	9.96	609
Chrenovec-Brusno	12.32	1,413
Chvojnica	9.30	224
Jalovec	6.02	586
Kamenec pod Vtáčnikom	25.29	1,751
Kanianka	7.93	3,748
Kľačno	48.69	1,074
Kocurany	4.17	530
Kostolná Ves	3.75	495
Koš	13.58	1,002
Lazany	9.88	1,840
Lehota pod Vtáčnikom	27.97	3,648
Liešťany	16.41	1,172
Lipník	5.47	599
Malá Čausa	15.34	708
Malinová	13.08	998
Nedožery-Brezany	24.16	2,063
Nevidzany	11.78	295
Nitrianske Pravno	31.20	3,052
Nitrianske Rudno	14.50	1,887
Nitrianske Sučany	18.06	1,189
Nitrica	24.03	1,141
Nováky	19.37	4,062
Opatovce nad Nitrou	9.17	1,528
Oslany	25.15	2,417
Podhradie	12.75	285
Poluvsie	2.16	532
Poruba	15.14	1,342
Pravenec	10.79	1,285
Prievidza	43.06	41,959
Radobica	11.45	571
Ráztočno	17.59	1,273
Rudnianska Lehota	12.23	745
Sebedražie	8.43	1,663
Seč	7.65	392
Šútovce	7.08	461
Temeš	4.27	184
Tužina	48.20	1,218
Valaská Belá	64.73	1,870
Veľká Čausa	7.81	550
Zemianske Kostoľany	12.74	1,718

Population and area values are current for year 2025.
