= Malá Čausa =

- Municipality
- Flag

- Location of Malá Čausa in the Trenčín Region Location of Malá Čausa in Slovakia
- Coordinates: 48.80°N 18.70°E
- Country: Slovakia
- Region: Trenčín Region
- District: Prievidza District
- First mentioned: 1430

Area
  - Total: 15.34 km^{2} (5.92 sq mi)
- Elevation: 340 m (1,120 ft)

Population (2025)
  - Total: 708
- Time zone: UTC+1 (CET)
  - Summer (DST): UTC+2 (CEST)
- Postal code: 971 01
- Area code: +421 46
- Vehicle registration plate (until 2022): PD

Malá Čausa (Hungarian: Kiscsóta) is a village and municipality in Prievidza District in the Trenčín Region of western Slovakia.

== History ==
According to historical records, the village was first mentioned in 1430.

== Geography ==
The municipality lies at an altitude of 340 metres (1,120 ft) and covers an area of 15.34 km^{2} (5.92 sq mi) (2025).

== Population ==
Population statistic (10 years)
| Year | 1995 | 2005 | 2015 | 2025 |
|---|---|---|---|---|
| Count | 635 | 631 | 687 | 708 |
| Difference | | −0.62% | +8.87% | +3.05% |

Population statistic
| Year | 2024 | 2025 |
|---|---|---|
| Count | 706 | 708 |
| Difference | | +0.28% |

It has a population of 708 people (31 December 2025).

=== Ethnicity ===
Census 2021 (1+ %)
| Ethnicity | Number | Fraction |
|---|---|---|
| Slovak | 674 | 96.42% |
| Not found out | 24 | 3.43% |
| Total | 699 | |

In year 2021 was 699 people by ethnicity 674 as Slovak, 24 as Not found out, 4 as Czech, 3 as Other, 2 as Russian, 1 as Italian, 1 as Serbian, 1 as German and 1 as Croatian.

Note on population: The difference values of population numbers in the table "Population statistic" and in the sections "Ethnicity" & "Religion" is caused by the use of various statistical methods.

=== Religion ===
Census 2021 (1+ %)
| Religion | Number | Fraction |
|---|---|---|
| Roman Catholic Church | 383 | 54.79% |
| None | 249 | 35.62% |
| Not found out | 33 | 4.72% |
| Other | 9 | 1.29% |
| Total | 699 | |

In year 2021 was 699 people by religion 383 from Roman Catholic Church, 249 from None, 33 from Not found out, 9 from Other, 6 from Paganism and natural spirituality, 6 from Evangelical Church, 5 from Greek Catholic Church, 4 from Eastern Orthodox Church, 2 from Christian Congregations in Slovakia, 1 from United Methodist Church and 1 from Buddhism.
