= Tužina =

- Municipality
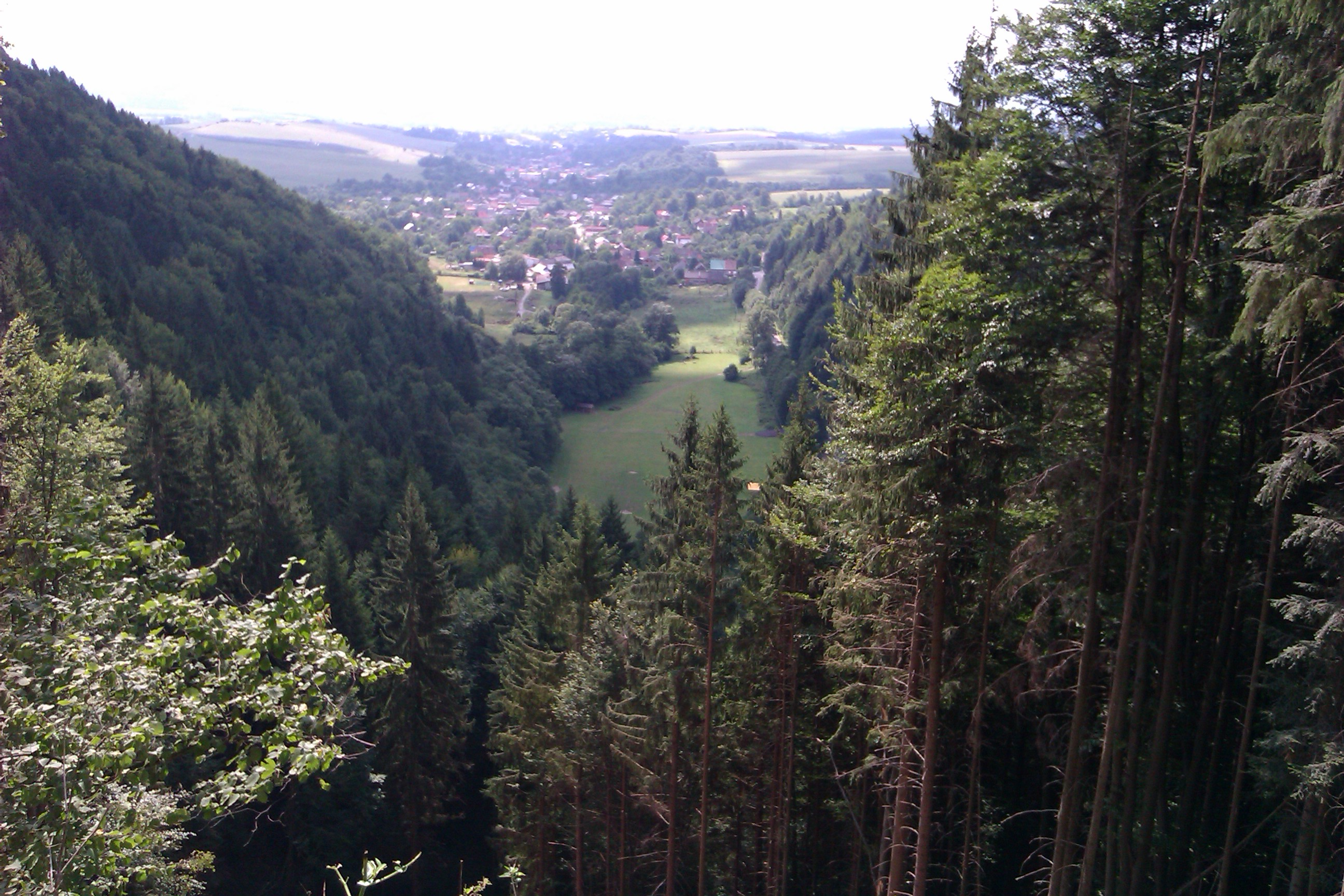

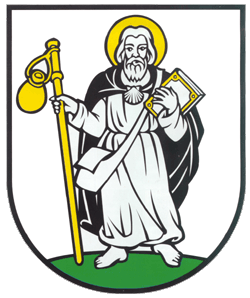
- Flag Coat of arms

- Location of Tužina in the Trenčín Region Location of Tužina in Slovakia
- Coordinates: 48.90°N 18.62°E
- Country: Slovakia
- Region: Trenčín Region
- District: Prievidza District
- First mentioned: 1393

Area
  - Total: 48.20 km^{2} (18.61 sq mi)
- Elevation: 373 m (1,224 ft)

Population (2025)
  - Total: 1,218
- Time zone: UTC+1 (CET)
  - Summer (DST): UTC+2 (CEST)
- Postal code: 972 14
- Area code: +421 46
- Vehicle registration plate (until 2022): PD
- Website: www.tuzina.sk

Tužina (German: Schmiedshau, Hungarian: Kovácspalota) is a village and municipality in Prievidza District in the Trenčín Region of western Slovakia.

== History ==
In historical records the village was first mentioned in 1393.

The village once belonged to the German language island of Hauerland but the majority of the German population was expelled at the end of World War II.

== Geography ==
The municipality lies at an altitude of 373 metres (1,224 ft) and covers an area of 48.20 km^{2} (18.61 sq mi) (2025).

== Population ==
Population statistic (10 years)
Year	1995	2005	2015	2025
Count	1183	1228	1186	1218
Difference		+3.80%	−3.42%	+2.69%

Population statistic
Year	2024	2025
Count	1214	1218
Difference		+0.32%

It has a population of 1218 people (31 December 2025).

=== Ethnicity ===
Census 2021 (1+ %)
Ethnicity	Number	Fraction
Slovak	1170	96.85%
German	44	3.64%
Not found out	19	1.57%
Total	1208	

In year 2021 was 1208 people by ethnicity 1170 as Slovak, 44 as German, 19 as Not found out, 10 as Czech, 3 as Hungarian, 2 as Russian, 1 as Romani, 1 as Romanian, 1 as Austrian, 1 as Polish and 1 as Canadian.

Note on population: The difference values of population numbers in the table "Population statistic" and in the sections "Ethnicity" & "Religion" is caused by the use of various statistical methods.

=== Religion ===
Census 2021 (1+ %)
Religion	Number	Fraction
Roman Catholic Church	662	54.8%
None	455	37.67%
Not found out	17	1.41%
Evangelical Church	17	1.41%
Total	1208	

In year 2021 was 1208 people by religion 662 from Roman Catholic Church, 455 from None, 17 from Not found out, 17 from Evangelical Church, 11 from Christian Congregations in Slovakia, 10 from Greek Catholic Church, 9 from Paganism and natural spirituality, 6 from Other, 6 from Seventh-day Adventist Church, 6 from Ad hoc movements, 4 from Jehovah's Witnesses, 2 from Calvinist Church, 1 from Eastern Orthodox Church, 1 from Other and not ascertained christian church and 1 from Bahá'i Community.
