= Malinová, Slovakia =

Malinová
- Municipality
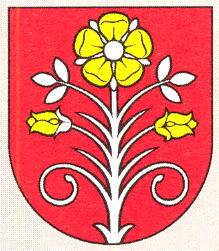
- Flag Coat of arms

- Location of Malinová in the Trenčín Region Location of Malinová in Slovakia
- Coordinates: 48°51′00″N 18°37′00″E
- Country: Slovakia
- Region: Trenčín Region
- District: Prievidza District
- First mentioned: 1339

Area
  - Total: 13.08 km^{2} (5.05 sq mi)
- Elevation: 342 m (1,122 ft)

Population (2025)
  - Total: 998
- Time zone: UTC+1 (CET)
  - Summer (DST): UTC+2 (CEST)
- Postal code: 972 13
- Area code: +421 46
- Vehicle registration plate (until 2022): PD
- Website: www.malinova.sk

Malinová (German: Zeche; Hungarian: Csék) is a village and municipality in Prievidza District in the Trenčín Region of western Slovakia. It lies about 15 km north of the town of Prievidza. The village belonged to the German language island Hauerland. The German population was expelled in 1944.

== Evolution of the village name ==
The village of Malinová was called by many different names over the centuries:

- 1339 Chach
- 1437 Cheche
- 1464 Czecza/Posega
- 1485 Czecha/Pozega
- 1486, 1488, 1490 Czecze, Zech [ˈtsɛç]
- 1489 Chech
- 1571-1573 Czek
- 1927-1948 Czach, since 1938 also Zeche [ˈtsɛçə]
- since 1948 Malinová

== History ==
In historical records the village was first mentioned in 1339.

== Timeline ==
- 1339 Foundation
- 1431 Church badly damaged by the Hussites
- 1612 First evidence of gold washing
- 1642-08-08 Charter of Count Paul Pálffy ("Wasserverbot")
- 1726 The office of the town judge is sold to the landlord
- 1788 The gothic church is built, the town becomes an independent parish
- 1822 The Trinity is built
- 1846/1847 Rectory and school are rebuilt
- 1806, 1840, 1663 Serious fires
- 1869 Building of St. Mary's chapel
- 1870 The church is closed due to danger of collapse

== Geography ==
- Area: 13.08 km^{2}
- Population: 910
- Location: 48°51′00″N 18°37′00″E
- Altitude in m above sea level: 342

== Population ==
Population statistic (10 years)
Year	1995	2005	2015	2025
Count	831	889	917	998
Difference		+6.97%	+3.14%	+8.83%

Population statistic
Year	2024	2025
Count	1011	998
Difference		−1.28%

It has a population of 998 people (31 December 2025).

=== Ethnicity ===
Census 2021 (1+ %)
Ethnicity	Number	Fraction
Slovak	943	97.01%
German	30	3.08%
Not found out	12	1.23%
Total	972	

In year 2021 was 972 people by ethnicity 943 as Slovak, 30 as German, 12 as Not found out, 4 as Czech, 3 as Other, 2 as Romani, 1 as Russian and 1 as Hungarian.

Note on population: The difference values of population numbers in the table "Population statistic" and in the sections "Ethnicity" & "Religion" is caused by the use of various statistical methods.

=== Religion ===
Census 2021 (1+ %)
Religion	Number	Fraction
None	468	48.15%
Roman Catholic Church	451	46.4%
Not found out	16	1.65%
Christian Congregations in Slovakia	10	1.03%
Evangelical Church	10	1.03%
Total	972	

In year 2021 was 972 people by religion 468 from None, 451 from Roman Catholic Church, 16 from Not found out, 10 from Christian Congregations in Slovakia, 10 from Evangelical Church, 7 from Greek Catholic Church, 4 from Other and not ascertained christian church, 2 from Other, 2 from Buddhism, 1 from Jewish community and 1 from Calvinist Church.

== Books ==
- Schlenker, M. (1986). Von Heimat zu Heimat. Stuttgart: Hilfsbund der Karpatendeutschen Katholiken.
