= Dolné Vestenice =

- Municipality
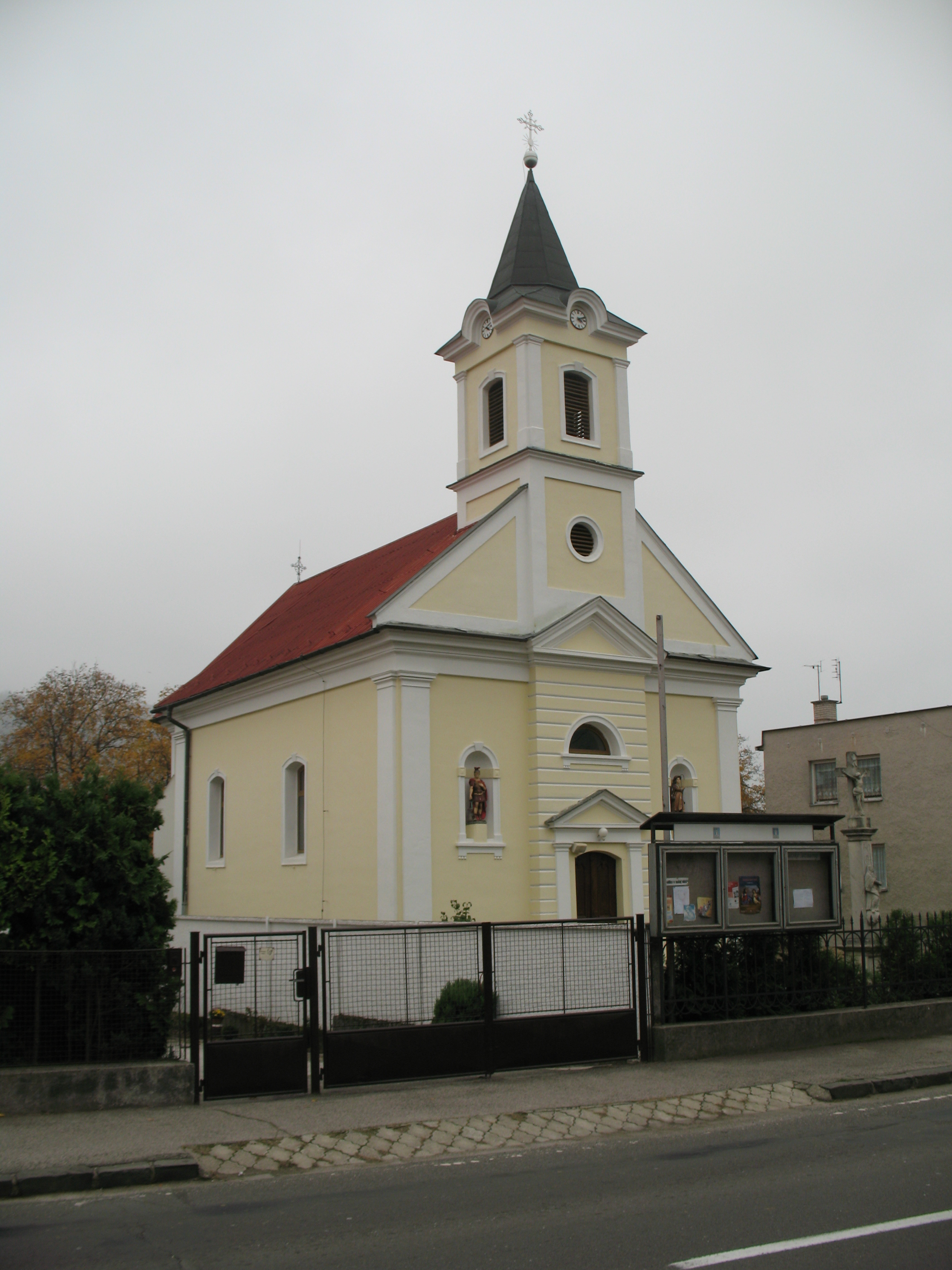
- Church of the Immaculate Conception

- Flag

- Location of Dolné Vestenice in the Trenčín Region Location of Dolné Vestenice in Slovakia
- Coordinates: 48.70°N 18.40°E
- Country: Slovakia
- Region: Trenčín Region
- District: Prievidza District
- First mentioned: 1349

Area
  - Total: 13.83 km^{2} (5.34 sq mi)
- Elevation: 223 m (732 ft)

Population (2025)
  - Total: 2,346
- Time zone: UTC+1 (CET)
  - Summer (DST): UTC+2 (CEST)
- Postal code: 972 23
- Area code: +421 46
- Vehicle registration plate (until 2022): PD
- Website: www.dolnevestenice.sk

Dolné Vestenice (Hungarian: Alsóvesztény) is a village and municipality in Prievidza District in the Trenčín Region of western Slovakia.

== History ==
In historical records the village was first mentioned in 1349.

== Geography ==
The municipality lies at an altitude of 223 metres (732 ft) and covers an area of 13.83 km^{2} (5.34 sq mi) (2025).

== Population ==
Population statistic (10 years)
Year	1995	2005	2015	2025
Count	2712	2673	2581	2346
Difference		−1.43%	−3.44%	−9.10%

Population statistic
Year	2024	2025
Count	2374	2346
Difference		−1.17%

It has a population of 2346 people (31 December 2025).

=== Ethnicity ===
Census 2021 (1+ %)
Ethnicity	Number	Fraction
Slovak	2415	96.79%
Not found out	67	2.68%
Czech	34	1.36%
Total	2495	

In year 2021 was 2495 people by ethnicity 2415 as Slovak, 67 as Not found out, 34 as Czech, 4 as Other, 2 as Irish, 1 as Ukrainian, 1 as Italian, 1 as Romani, 1 as Romanian, 1 as German, 1 as Hungarian, 1 as Greek, 1 as Croatian and 1 as English.

Note on population: The difference values of population numbers in the table "Population statistic" and in the sections "Ethnicity" & "Religion" is caused by the use of various statistical methods.

=== Religion ===
Census 2021 (1+ %)
Religion	Number	Fraction
Roman Catholic Church	1722	69.02%
None	626	25.09%
Not found out	73	2.93%
Evangelical Church	29	1.16%
Total	2495	

In year 2021 was 2495 people by religion 1722 from Roman Catholic Church, 626 from None, 73 from Not found out, 29 from Evangelical Church, 8 from Greek Catholic Church, 7 from Other, 6 from Christian Congregations in Slovakia, 6 from Ad hoc movements, 5 from Calvinist Church, 4 from Other and not ascertained christian church, 3 from Eastern Orthodox Church, 2 from Paganism and natural spirituality, 2 from Buddhism, 1 from Jehovah's Witnesses and 1 from Hinduism.

== Genealogical resources ==
The records for genealogical research are available at the state archive "Statny Archiv in Nitra, Slovakia"

- Roman Catholic church records (births/marriages/deaths): 1702-1935 (parish B)

== See also ==
- List of municipalities and towns in Slovakia
