= Nitrianske Rudno =

- Municipality
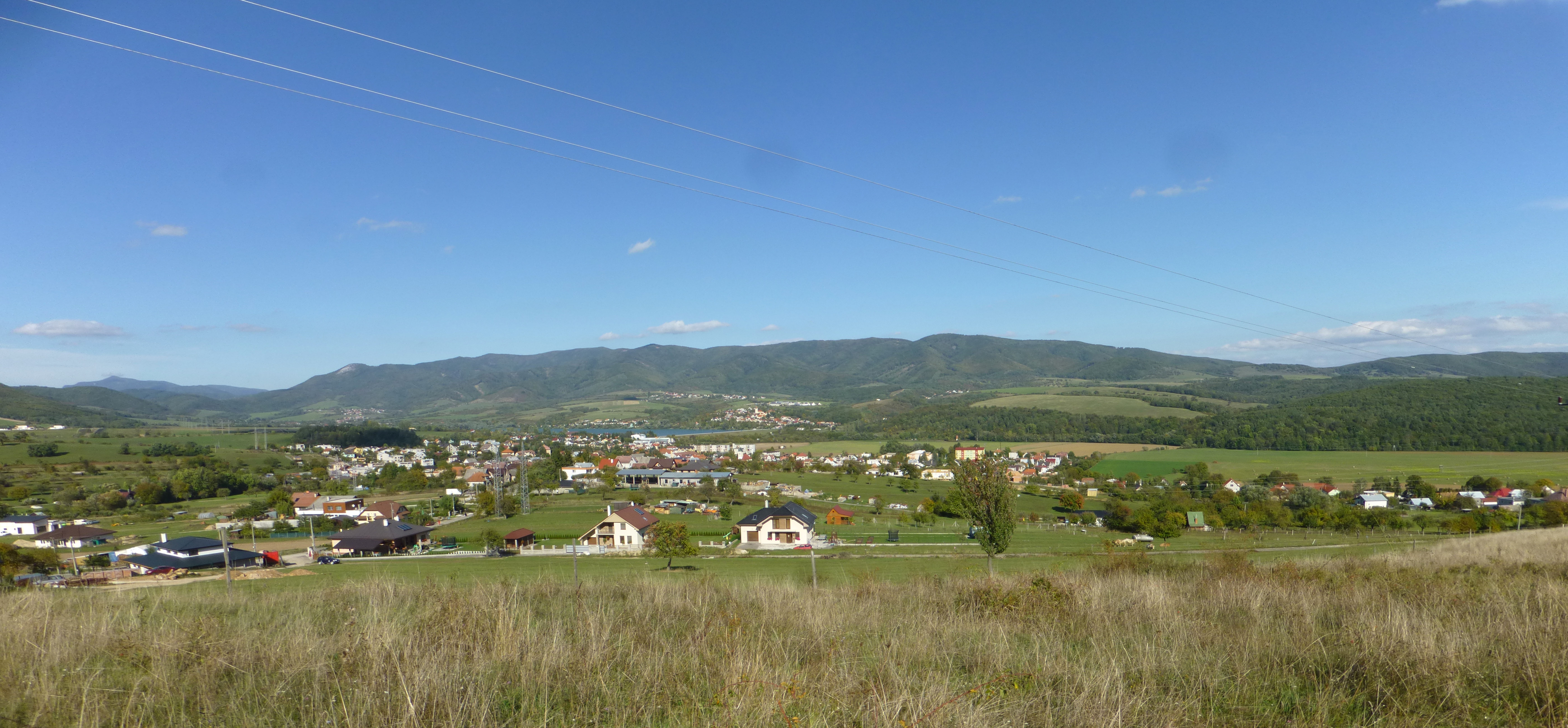

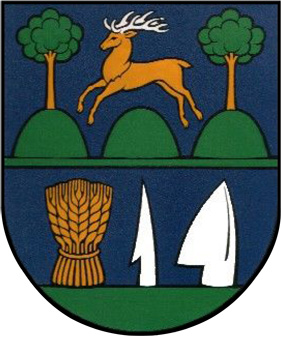
- Flag Coat of arms

- Location of Nitrianske Rudno in the Trenčín Region Location of Nitrianske Rudno in Slovakia
- Coordinates: 48.80°N 18.48°E
- Country: Slovakia
- Region: Trenčín Region
- District: Prievidza District
- First mentioned: 1275

Area
  - Total: 14.50 km^{2} (5.60 sq mi)
- Elevation: 319 m (1,047 ft)

Population (2025)
  - Total: 1,887
- Time zone: UTC+1 (CET)
  - Summer (DST): UTC+2 (CEST)
- Postal code: 972 26
- Area code: +421 46
- Vehicle registration plate (until 2022): PD
- Website: www.nitrianskerudno.sk

Nitrianske Rudno (Slovak pronunciation: [ˈɲitrɪɐnske ˈrudnɔ]; Hungarian: Divékrudnó) is a village and municipality in Prievidza District in the Trenčín Region of western Slovakia.

== History ==
In historical records the village was first mentioned in 1275.

== Geography ==
The municipality lies at an altitude of 319 metres (1,047 ft) and covers an area of 14.50 km^{2} (5.60 sq mi) (2025).

== Population ==
Population statistic (10 years)
Year	1995	2005	2015	2025
Count	1836	1976	1935	1887
Difference		+7.62%	−2.07%	−2.48%

Population statistic
Year	2024	2025
Count	1911	1887
Difference		−1.25%

It has a population of 1887 people (31 December 2025).

=== Ethnicity ===
Census 2021 (1+ %)
Ethnicity	Number	Fraction
Slovak	1896	98.49%
Not found out	22	1.14%
Total	1925	

In year 2021 was 1925 people by ethnicity 1896 as Slovak, 22 as Not found out, 16 as Czech, 4 as Other, 3 as Hungarian, 2 as Russian, 1 as Ukrainian, 1 as Romani, 1 as Rusyn, 1 as Polish, 1 as German, 1 as Moravian and 1 as Greek.

Note on population: The difference values of population numbers in the table "Population statistic" and in the sections "Ethnicity" & "Religion" is caused by the use of various statistical methods.

=== Religion ===
Census 2021 (1+ %)
Religion	Number	Fraction
Roman Catholic Church	1481	76.94%
None	349	18.13%
Not found out	50	2.6%
Total	1925	

In year 2021 was 1925 people by religion 1481 from Roman Catholic Church, 349 from None, 50 from Not found out, 10 from Greek Catholic Church, 10 from Evangelical Church, 5 from Calvinist Church, 5 from Other, 4 from Other and not ascertained christian church, 2 from Eastern Orthodox Church, 2 from Jehovah's Witnesses, 2 from Christian Congregations in Slovakia, 1 from Jewish community, 1 from New Apostolic Church, 1 from Hinduism, 1 from Buddhism and 1 from Ad hoc movements.
