= Temeš =

- Municipality
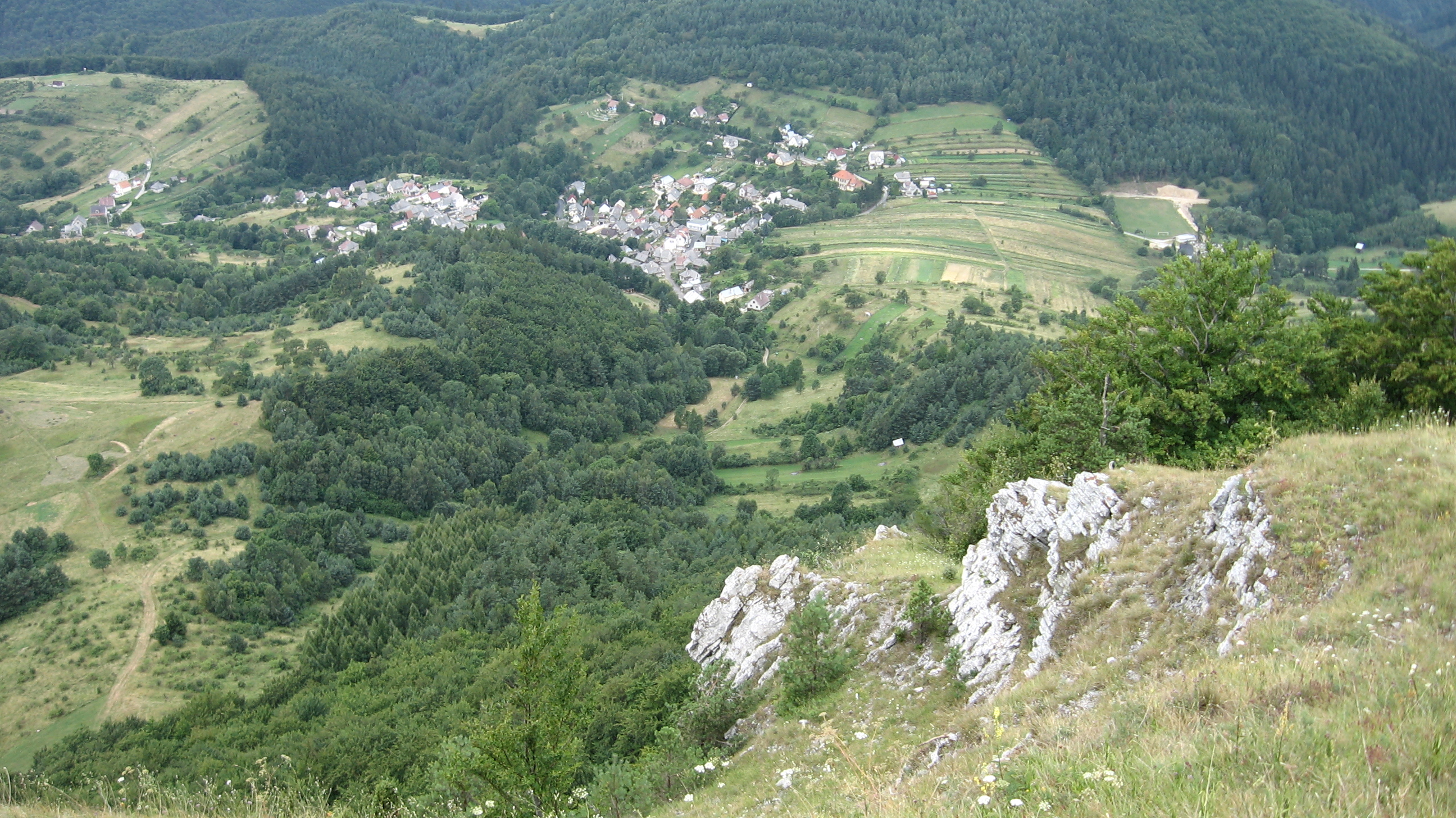

- Flag

- Location of Temeš in the Trenčín Region Location of Temeš in Slovakia
- Coordinates: 48.87°N 18.48°E
- Country: Slovakia
- Region: Trenčín Region
- District: Prievidza District
- First mentioned: 1332

Area
  - Total: 4.27 km^{2} (1.65 sq mi)
- Elevation: 518 m (1,699 ft)

Population (2025)
  - Total: 184
- Time zone: UTC+1 (CET)
  - Summer (DST): UTC+2 (CEST)
- Postal code: 972 29
- Area code: +421 46
- Vehicle registration plate (until 2022): PD
- Website: www.temes.sk

Temeš (Hungarian: Divéktemes) is a village and municipality in Prievidza District in the Trenčín Region of western Slovakia.

== History ==
In historical records the village was first mentioned in 1332.

== Geography ==
The municipality lies at an altitude of 518 metres (1,699 ft) and covers an area of 4.27 km^{2} (1.65 sq mi) (2025).

== Population ==
Population statistic (10 years)
Year	1995	2005	2015	2025
Count	322	287	230	184
Difference		−10.86%	−19.86%	−20%

Population statistic
Year	2024	2025
Count	189	184
Difference		−2.64%

It has a population of 184 people (31 December 2025).

=== Ethnicity ===
Census 2021 (1+ %)
Ethnicity	Number	Fraction
Slovak	207	97.64%
Not found out	5	2.35%
Total	212	

In year 2021 was 212 people by ethnicity 207 as Slovak, 5 as Not found out and 1 as Ukrainian.

Note on population: The difference values of population numbers in the table "Population statistic" and in the sections "Ethnicity" & "Religion" is caused by the use of various statistical methods.

=== Religion ===
Census 2021 (1+ %)
Religion	Number	Fraction
Roman Catholic Church	143	67.45%
None	51	24.06%
Greek Catholic Church	5	2.36%
Not found out	4	1.89%
Evangelical Church	3	1.42%
Total	212	

In year 2021 was 212 people by religion 143 from Roman Catholic Church, 51 from None, 5 from Greek Catholic Church, 4 from Not found out, 3 from Evangelical Church, 2 from Paganism and natural spirituality, 2 from Other, 1 from Calvinist Church and 1 from Jehovah's Witnesses.
