= Cigeľ =

- Municipality
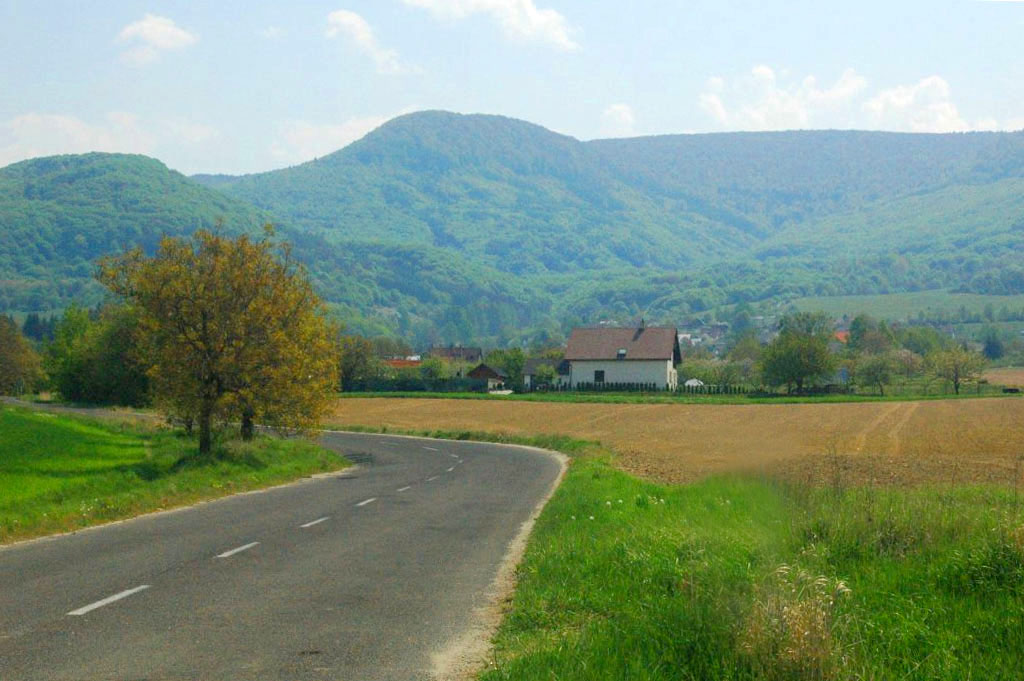

- Flag

- Location of Cigeľ in the Trenčín Region Location of Cigeľ in Slovakia
- Coordinates: 48.72°N 18.65°E
- Country: Slovakia
- Region: Trenčín Region
- District: Prievidza District
- First mentioned: 1362

Area
  - Total: 17.34 km^{2} (6.70 sq mi)
- Elevation: 450 m (1,480 ft)

Population (2025)
  - Total: 1,283
- Time zone: UTC+1 (CET)
  - Summer (DST): UTC+2 (CEST)
- Postal code: 971 01
- Area code: +421 46
- Vehicle registration plate (until 2022): PD
- Website: www.cigel.sk

Cigeľ (Hungarian: Cégely) is a village and municipality in Prievidza District in the Trenčín Region of western Slovakia.

== History ==
In historical records the village was first mentioned in 1362.

== Geography ==
The municipality lies at an altitude of 450 metres (1,480 ft) and covers an area of 17.34 km^{2} (6.70 sq mi) (2025).

== Population ==
Population statistic (10 years)
Year	1995	2005	2015	2025
Count	993	1023	1251	1283
Difference		+3.02%	+22.28%	+2.55%

Population statistic
Year	2024	2025
Count	1287	1283
Difference		−0.31%

It has a population of 1283 people (31 December 2025).

=== Ethnicity ===
Census 2021 (1+ %)
Ethnicity	Number	Fraction
Slovak	1225	96.38%
Not found out	40	3.14%
Total	1271	

In year 2021 was 1271 people by ethnicity 1225 as Slovak, 40 as Not found out, 6 as Other, 4 as Russian, 3 as Rusyn, 3 as English, 2 as Irish, 2 as Ukrainian, 1 as Czech, 1 as Romani, 1 as Austrian, 1 as Hungarian and 1 as Canadian.

Note on population: The difference values of population numbers in the table "Population statistic" and in the sections "Ethnicity" & "Religion" is caused by the use of various statistical methods.

=== Religion ===
Census 2021 (1+ %)
Religion	Number	Fraction
Roman Catholic Church	761	59.87%
None	412	32.42%
Not found out	43	3.38%
Evangelical Church	20	1.57%
Total	1271	

In year 2021 was 1271 people by religion 761 from Roman Catholic Church, 412 from None, 43 from Not found out, 20 from Evangelical Church, 9 from Christian Congregations in Slovakia, 8 from Ad hoc movements, 5 from Other, 4 from Paganism and natural spirituality, 2 from Eastern Orthodox Church, 2 from Greek Catholic Church, 2 from Buddhism, 1 from Calvinist Church, 1 from Other and not ascertained christian church and 1 from Jehovah's Witnesses.

== Gallery ==
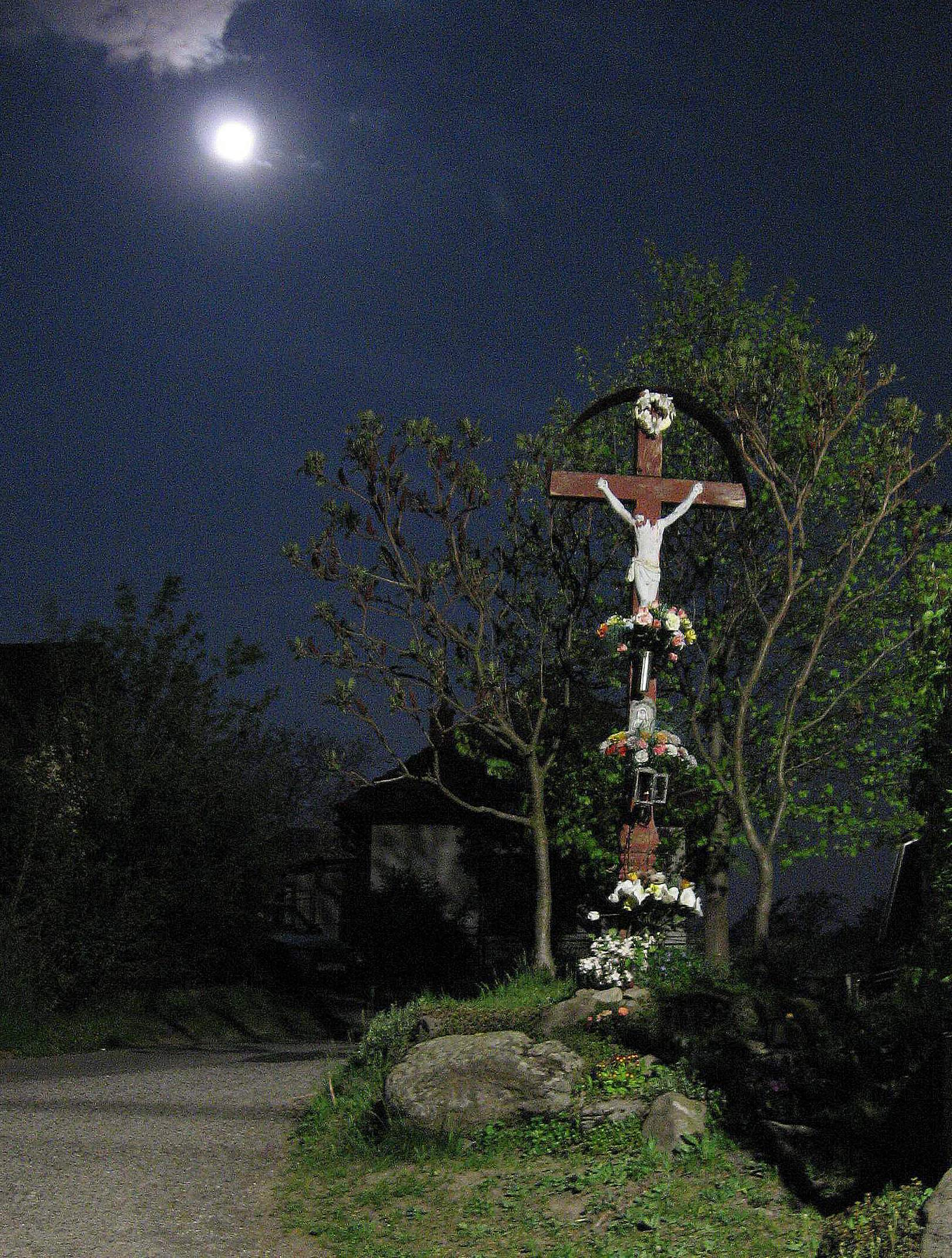

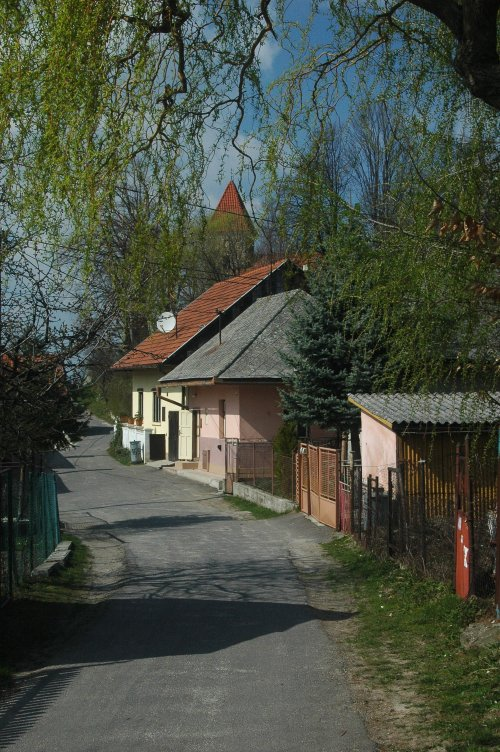

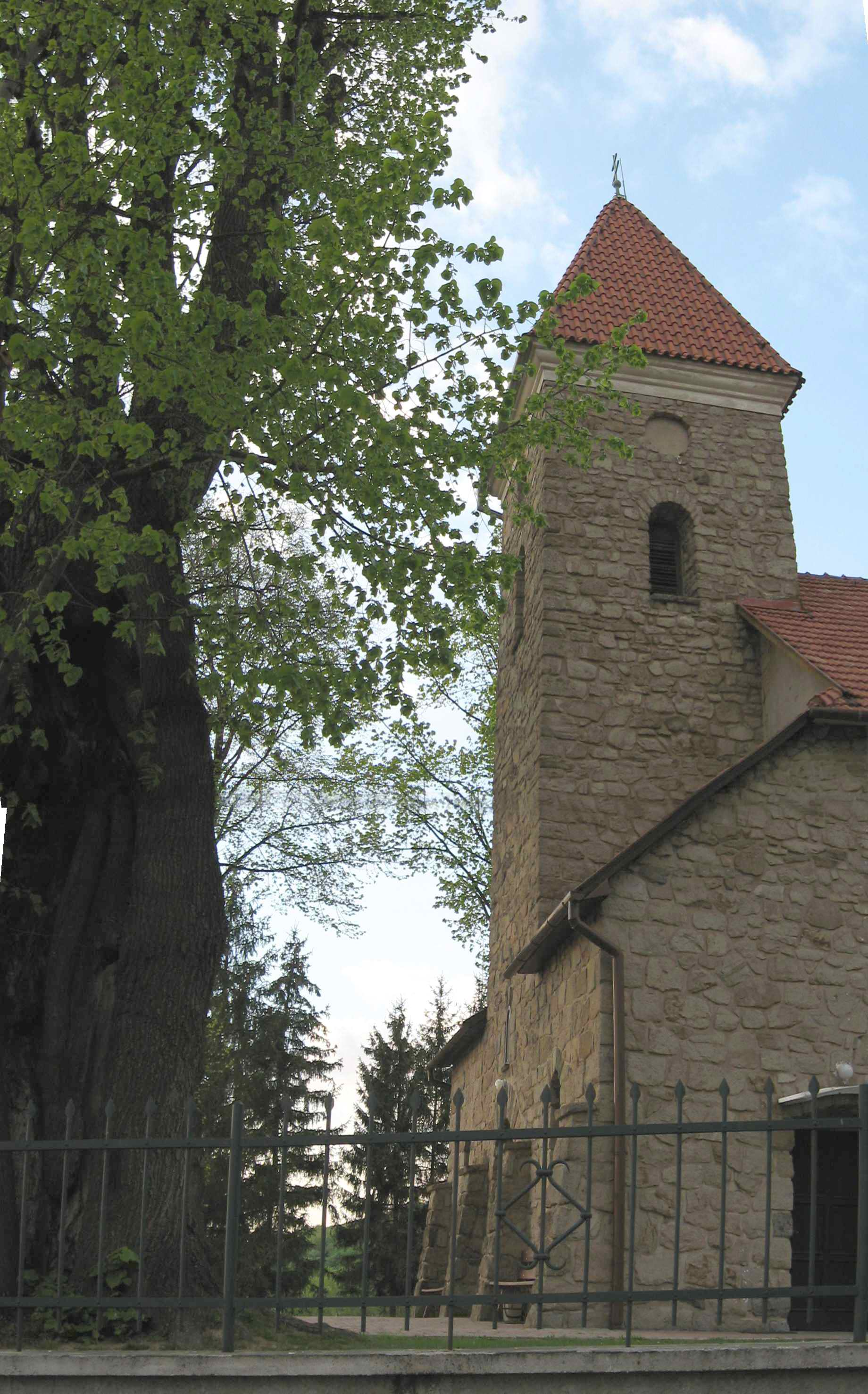

== Genealogical resources ==
The records for genealogical research are available at the state archive "Statny Archiv in Nitra, Slovakia"

- Roman Catholic church records (births/marriages/deaths): 1660-1895 (parish B)

== See also ==
- List of municipalities and towns in Slovakia
