= Horná Ves, Prievidza District =

Horná Ves
- Municipality
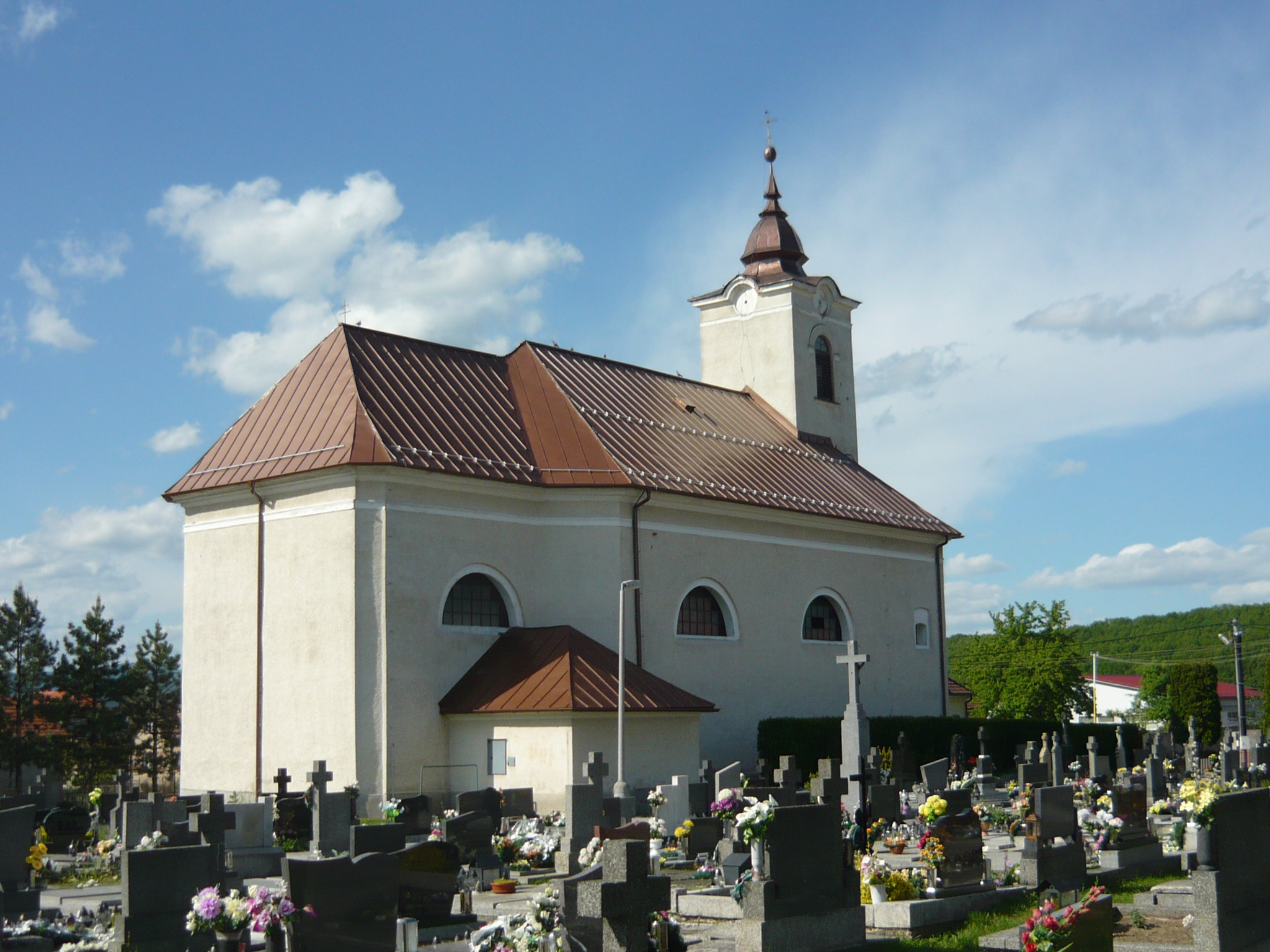
- Church of the Conversion of Saint Paul

- Flag

- Location of Horná Ves in the Trenčín Region Location of Horná Ves in Slovakia
- Coordinates: 48°36′30″N 18°29′30″E
- Country: Slovakia
- Region: Trenčín Region
- District: Prievidza District
- First mentioned: 1293

Area
  - Total: 18.56 km^{2} (7.17 sq mi)
- Elevation: 318 m (1,043 ft)

Population (2025)
  - Total: 1,097
- Time zone: UTC+1 (CET)
  - Summer (DST): UTC+2 (CEST)
- Postal code: 972 48
- Area code: +421 46
- Vehicle registration plate (until 2022): PD
- Website: www.hornaves.sk

Horná Ves (Hungarian: Ófelfalu) is a village and municipality in Prievidza District in the Trenčín Region of western Slovakia.

== History ==
In historical records the village was first mentioned in 1293.

== Geography ==
The municipality lies at an altitude of 318 metres (1,043 ft) and covers an area of 18.56 km^{2} (7.17 sq mi) (2025).

== Population ==
Population statistic (10 years)
Year	1995	2005	2015	2025
Count	1090	1070	1453	1097
Difference		−1.83%	+35.79%	−24.50%

Population statistic
Year	2024	2025
Count	1090	1097
Difference		+0.64%

It has a population of 1097 people (31 December 2025).

=== Ethnicity ===
Census 2021 (1+ %)
Ethnicity	Number	Fraction
Slovak	1052	98.13%
Not found out	21	1.95%
Total	1072	

In year 2021 was 1072 people by ethnicity 1052 as Slovak, 21 as Not found out, 3 as Irish, 1 as Czech, 1 as Russian, 1 as Other and 1 as English.

Note on population: The difference values of population numbers in the table "Population statistic" and in the sections "Ethnicity" & "Religion" is caused by the use of various statistical methods.

=== Religion ===
Census 2021 (1+ %)
Religion	Number	Fraction
Roman Catholic Church	824	76.87%
None	158	14.74%
Not found out	37	3.45%
Christian Congregations in Slovakia	20	1.87%
Greek Catholic Church	14	1.31%
Total	1072	

In year 2021 was 1072 people by religion 824 from Roman Catholic Church, 158 from None, 37 from Not found out, 20 from Christian Congregations in Slovakia, 14 from Greek Catholic Church, 6 from Other, 5 from Other and not ascertained christian church, 3 from Evangelical Church, 3 from Ad hoc movements, 1 from Eastern Orthodox Church and 1 from Paganism and natural spirituality.

== Genealogical resources ==
The records for genealogical research are available at the state archive "Statny Archiv in Nitra, Slovakia"

- Roman Catholic church records (births/marriages/deaths): 1688-1896 (parish A)

== See also ==
- List of municipalities and towns in Slovakia
