= Rudnianska Lehota =

- Municipality
- Flag

- Location of Rudnianska Lehota in the Trenčín Region Location of Rudnianska Lehota in Slovakia
- Coordinates: 48.80°N 18.47°E
- Country: Slovakia
- Region: Trenčín Region
- District: Prievidza District
- First mentioned: 1477

Area
  - Total: 12.23 km^{2} (4.72 sq mi)
- Elevation: 364 m (1,194 ft)

Population (2025)
  - Total: 745
- Time zone: UTC+1 (CET)
  - Summer (DST): UTC+2 (CEST)
- Postal code: 972 26
- Area code: +421 46
- Vehicle registration plate (until 2022): PD
- Website: www.rudnianskalehota.sk

Rudnianska Lehota (Hungarian: Rudnószabadi) is a village and municipality in Prievidza District in the Trenčín Region of western Slovakia.

== History ==
In historical records the village was first mentioned in 1477.

== Geography ==
The municipality lies at an altitude of 364 metres (1,194 ft) and covers an area of 12.23 km^{2} (4.72 sq mi) (2025).

== Population ==
Population statistic (10 years)
| Year | 1995 | 2005 | 2015 | 2025 |
|---|---|---|---|---|
| Count | 720 | 721 | 769 | 745 |
| Difference | | +0.13% | +6.65% | −3.12% |

Population statistic
| Year | 2024 | 2025 |
|---|---|---|
| Count | 732 | 745 |
| Difference | | +1.77% |

It has a population of 745 people (31 December 2025).

=== Ethnicity ===
Census 2021 (1+ %)
| Ethnicity | Number | Fraction |
|---|---|---|
| Slovak | 710 | 96.46% |
| Not found out | 24 | 3.26% |
| Total | 736 | |

In year 2021 was 736 people by ethnicity 710 as Slovak, 24 as Not found out, 5 as Hungarian and 2 as Czech.

Note on population: The difference values of population numbers in the table "Population statistic" and in the sections "Ethnicity" & "Religion" is caused by the use of various statistical methods.

=== Religion ===
Census 2021 (1+ %)
| Religion | Number | Fraction |
|---|---|---|
| Roman Catholic Church | 566 | 76.9% |
| None | 124 | 16.85% |
| Not found out | 25 | 3.4% |
| Total | 736 | |

In year 2021 was 736 people by religion 566 from Roman Catholic Church, 124 from None, 25 from Not found out, 6 from Greek Catholic Church, 3 from Christian Congregations in Slovakia, 3 from Church of Jesus Christ of Latter-day Saints, 3 from Apostolic Church, 2 from Other, 1 from Calvinist Church, 1 from Other and not ascertained christian church, 1 from Evangelical Church and 1 from Ad hoc movements.
