= Dlžín =

- Municipality
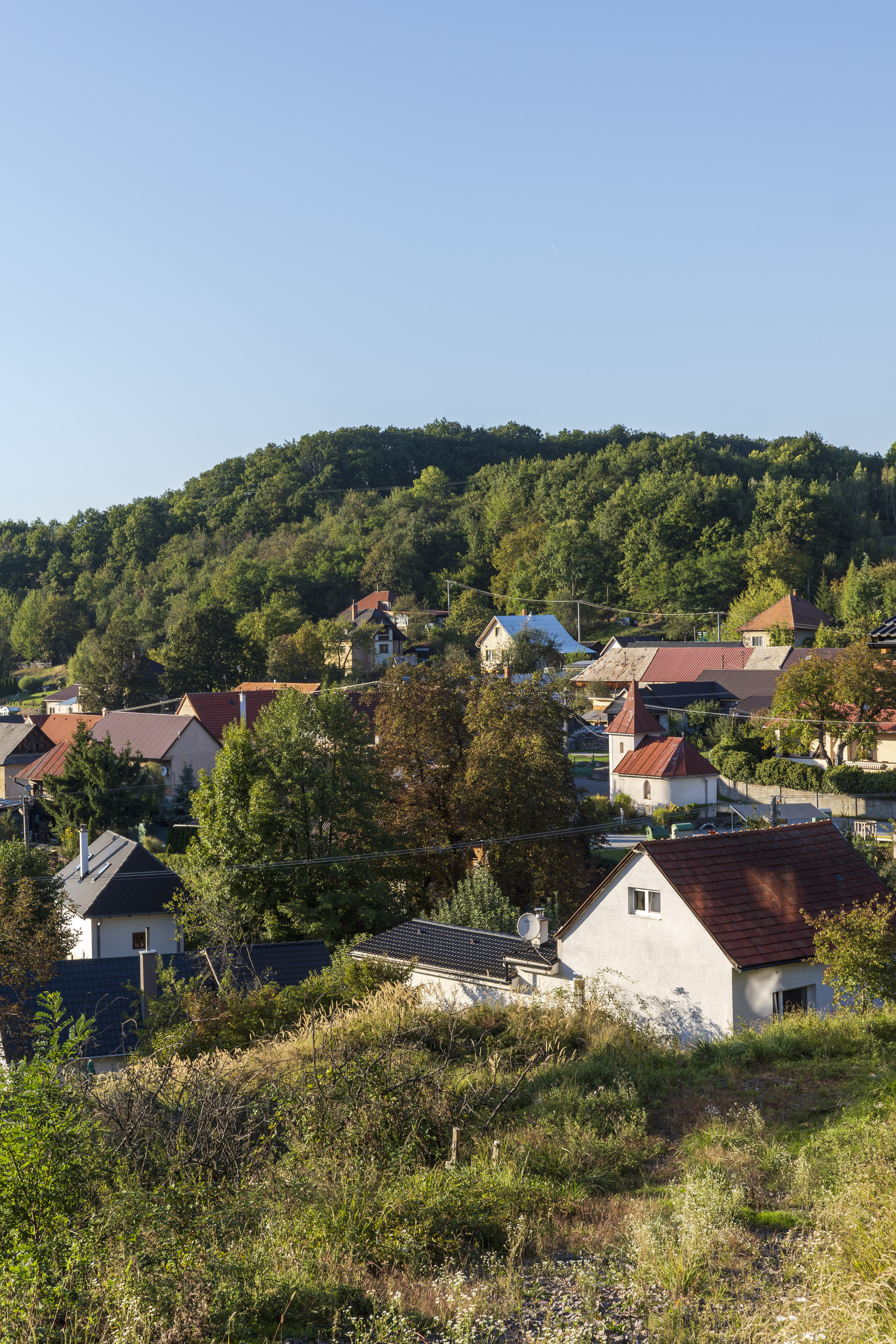

- Flag

- Location of Dlžín in the Trenčín Region Location of Dlžín in Slovakia
- Coordinates: 48.82°N 18.52°E
- Country: Slovakia
- Region: Trenčín Region
- District: Prievidza District
- First mentioned: 1272

Area
  - Total: 6.65 km^{2} (2.57 sq mi)
- Elevation: 404 m (1,325 ft)

Population (2025)
  - Total: 142
- Time zone: UTC+1 (CET)
  - Summer (DST): UTC+2 (CEST)
- Postal code: 972 26
- Area code: +421 46
- Vehicle registration plate (until 2022): PD

Dlžín (Hungarian: Delzsény) is a village and municipality in Prievidza District in the Trenčín Region of western Slovakia.

== History ==
In historical records the village was first mentioned in 1272.

== Geography ==
The municipality lies at an altitude of 404 metres (1,325 ft) and covers an area of 6.65 km^{2} (2.57 sq mi) (2025).

== Population ==
Population statistic (10 years)
Year	1995	2005	2015	2025
Count	214	185	166	142
Difference		−13.55%	−10.27%	−14.45%

Population statistic
Year	2024	2025
Count	146	142
Difference		−2.73%

It has a population of 142 people (31 December 2025).

=== Ethnicity ===
Census 2021 (1+ %)
Ethnicity	Number	Fraction
Slovak	151	91.51%
Not found out	15	9.09%
Czech	2	1.21%
Total	165	

In year 2021 was 165 people by ethnicity 151 as Slovak, 15 as Not found out, 2 as Czech, 1 as Serbian, 1 as Hungarian and 1 as Other.

Note on population: The difference values of population numbers in the table "Population statistic" and in the sections "Ethnicity" & "Religion" is caused by the use of various statistical methods.

=== Religion ===
Census 2021 (1+ %)
Religion	Number	Fraction
Roman Catholic Church	108	65.45%
None	36	21.82%
Not found out	13	7.88%
Eastern Orthodox Church	3	1.82%
Greek Catholic Church	3	1.82%
Total	165	

In year 2021 was 165 people by religion 108 from Roman Catholic Church, 36 from None, 13 from Not found out, 3 from Eastern Orthodox Church, 3 from Greek Catholic Church, 1 from Evangelical Church and 1 from Ad hoc movements.

== Genealogical resources ==
The records for genealogical research are available at the state archive "Statny Archiv in Nitra, Slovakia"

- Roman Catholic church records (births/marriages/deaths): 1790-1909 (parish B)

== See also ==
- List of municipalities and towns in Slovakia
