= Veľká Čausa =

- Municipality
- Flag

- Location of Veľká Čausa in the Trenčín Region Location of Veľká Čausa in Slovakia
- Coordinates: 48.78°N 18.70°E
- Country: Slovakia
- Region: Trenčín Region
- District: Prievidza District
- First mentioned: 1430

Area
  - Total: 7.81 km^{2} (3.02 sq mi)
- Elevation: 309 m (1,014 ft)

Population (2025)
  - Total: 550
- Time zone: UTC+1 (CET)
  - Summer (DST): UTC+2 (CEST)
- Postal code: 971 01
- Area code: +421 46
- Vehicle registration plate (until 2022): PD
- Website: www.velkacausa.sk

Veľká Čausa (Hungarian: Nagycsóta) is a village and municipality in Prievidza District in the Trenčín Region of western Slovakia.

== History ==
In historical records the village was first mentioned in 1430.

Today's territory of Veľká Čausa was settled in Eneolithic period

First historical mention dates back to 1358. In 1430 village was named Nagy Chewche, in 1773 Welka Cžausa, the Hungarian name was Nagycsausa or Nagycsóta. It belonged under the principality of Prievidza and since 1430, belonged under the principality of Bojnice. In 1675, the village had 28 farmstead households and 7 blacksmith households. In 1778, the village had a mill, a tavern, 25 households, and 274 residents. They were engaged in agriculture; they raised cattle and sheep.

== Geography ==
The municipality lies at an altitude of 309 metres (1,014 ft) and covers an area of 7.81 km^{2} (3.02 sq mi) (2025).

== Population ==
Population statistic (10 years)
Year	1995	2005	2015	2025
Count	417	425	478	550
Difference		+1.91%	+12.47%	+15.06%

Population statistic
Year	2024	2025
Count	546	550
Difference		+0.73%

It has a population of 550 people (31 December 2025).

=== Ethnicity ===
Census 2021 (1+ %)
Ethnicity	Number	Fraction
Slovak	505	97.3%
Not found out	17	3.27%
Czech	7	1.34%
Total	519	

In year 2021 was 519 people by ethnicity 505 as Slovak, 17 as Not found out, 7 as Czech, 1 as Italian, 1 as Silesian, 1 as Romani, 1 as Polish and 1 as German.

Note on population: The difference values of population numbers in the table "Population statistic" and in the sections "Ethnicity" & "Religion" is caused by the use of various statistical methods.

=== Religion ===
Census 2021 (1+ %)
Religion	Number	Fraction
Roman Catholic Church	281	54.14%
None	202	38.92%
Not found out	18	3.47%
Total	519	

In year 2021 was 519 people by religion 281 from Roman Catholic Church, 202 from None, 18 from Not found out, 5 from Christian Congregations in Slovakia, 4 from Evangelical Church, 4 from Ad hoc movements, 3 from Buddhism, 1 from Greek Catholic Church and 1 from United Methodist Church.
