= Kostolná Ves =

- Municipality
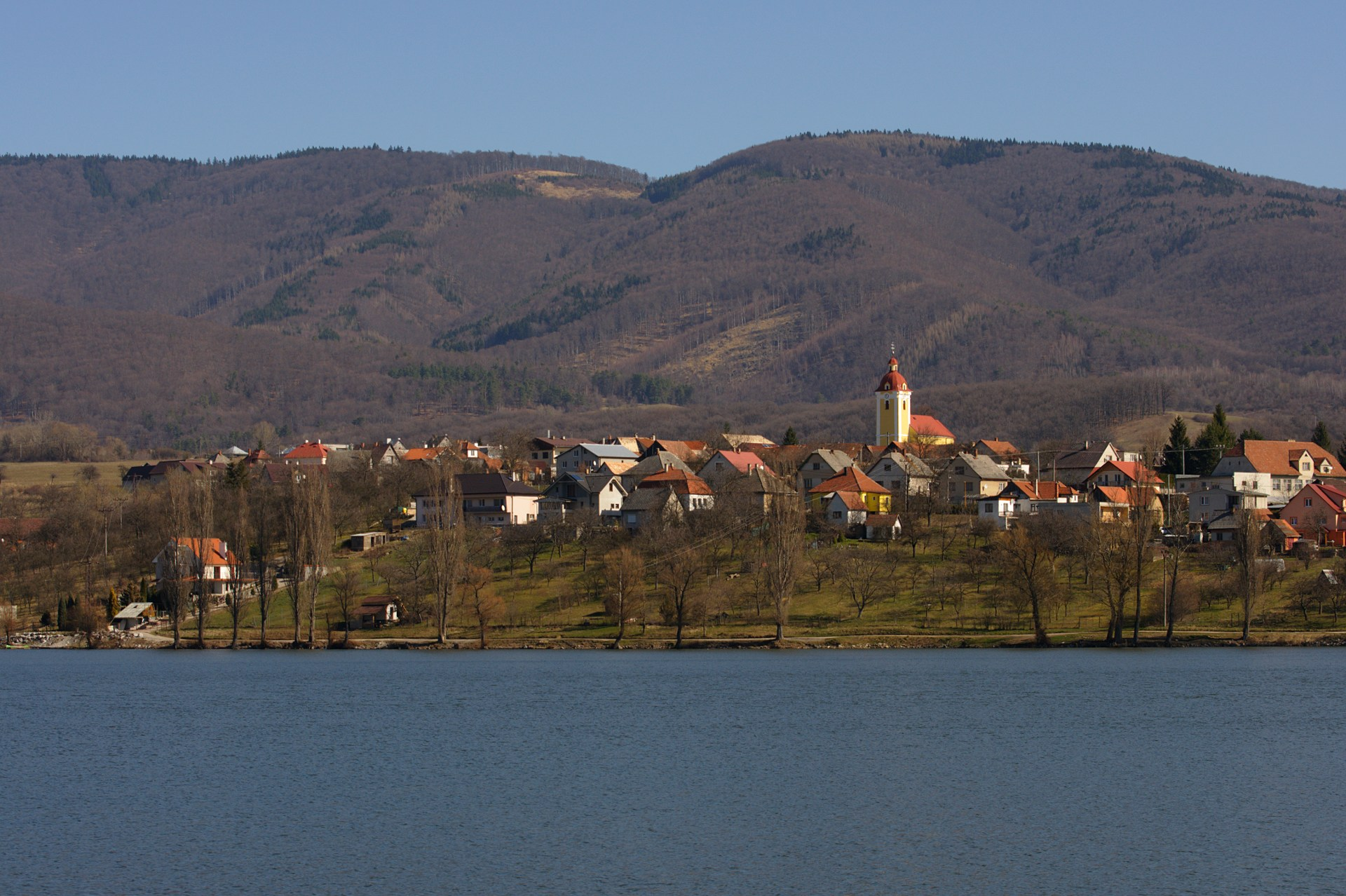

- Flag

- Location of Kostolná Ves in the Trenčín Region Location of Kostolná Ves in Slovakia
- Coordinates: 48.80°N 18.49°E
- Country: Slovakia
- Region: Trenčín Region
- District: Prievidza District
- First mentioned: 1332

Area
  - Total: 3.75 km^{2} (1.45 sq mi)
- Elevation: 358 m (1,175 ft)

Population (2025)
  - Total: 495
- Time zone: UTC+1 (CET)
  - Summer (DST): UTC+2 (CEST)
- Postal code: 972 26
- Area code: +421 46
- Vehicle registration plate (until 2022): PD
- Website: kostolnaves.sk

Kostolná Ves (Hungarian: Kisegyházas) is a village and municipality in Prievidza District in the Trenčín Region of western Slovakia.

== History ==
In historical records the village was first mentioned in 1332.

== Geography ==
The municipality lies at an altitude of 358 metres (1,175 ft) and covers an area of 3.75 km^{2} (1.45 sq mi) (2025).

== Population ==
Population statistic (10 years)
Year	1995	2005	2015	2025
Count	454	464	449	495
Difference		+2.20%	−3.23%	+10.24%

Population statistic
Year	2024	2025
Count	499	495
Difference		−0.80%

It has a population of 495 people (31 December 2025).

=== Ethnicity ===
Census 2021 (1+ %)
Ethnicity	Number	Fraction
Slovak	495	97.05%
Not found out	11	2.15%
Czech	8	1.56%
Total	510	

In year 2021 was 510 people by ethnicity 495 as Slovak, 11 as Not found out, 8 as Czech, 1 as Russian and 1 as Canadian.

Note on population: The difference values of population numbers in the table "Population statistic" and in the sections "Ethnicity" & "Religion" is caused by the use of various statistical methods.

=== Religion ===
Census 2021 (1+ %)
Religion	Number	Fraction
Roman Catholic Church	336	65.88%
None	146	28.63%
Not found out	13	2.55%
Total	510	

In year 2021 was 510 people by religion 336 from Roman Catholic Church, 146 from None, 13 from Not found out, 4 from Calvinist Church, 3 from Greek Catholic Church, 2 from Buddhism, 1 from Other and not ascertained christian church, 1 from Christian Congregations in Slovakia, 1 from Other, 1 from Hinduism, 1 from Evangelical Church and 1 from Ad hoc movements.

== Genealogical resources ==
The records for genealogical research are available at the state archive "Statny Archiv in Nitra, Slovakia"

- Roman Catholic church records (births/marriages/deaths): 1790-1909 (parish A)

== See also ==
- List of municipalities and towns in Slovakia
