= Chvojnica, Prievidza District =

Chvojnica
- Municipality
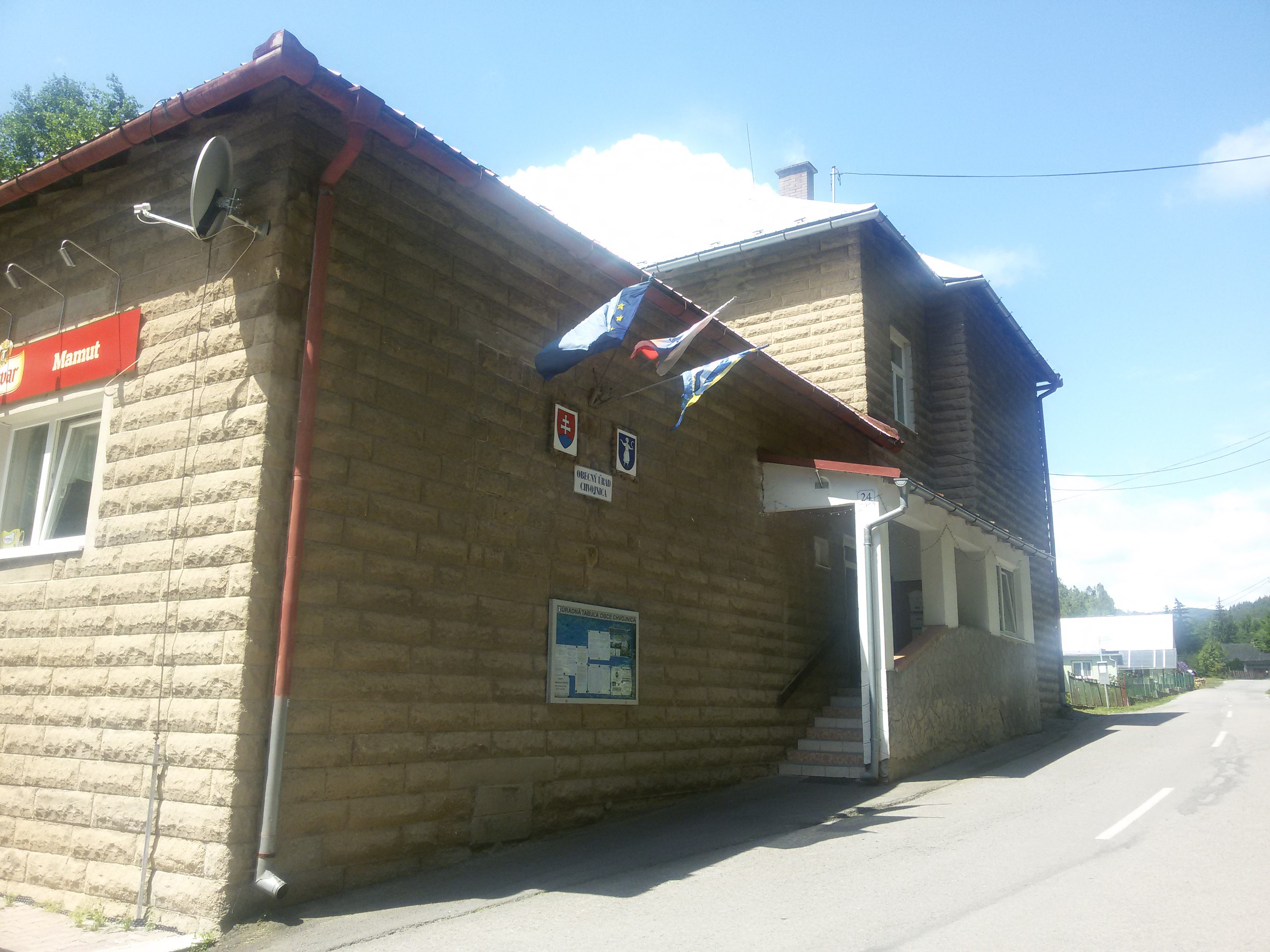

- Flag

- Location of Chvojnica in the Trenčín Region Location of Chvojnica in Slovakia
- Coordinates: 48°52′45″N 18°33′40″E
- Country: Slovakia
- Region: Trenčín Region
- District: Prievidza District
- First mentioned: 1614

Area
  - Total: 9.30 km^{2} (3.59 sq mi)
- Elevation: 484 m (1,588 ft)

Population (2025)
  - Total: 224
- Time zone: UTC+1 (CET)
  - Summer (DST): UTC+2 (CEST)
- Postal code: 972 14
- Area code: +421 46
- Vehicle registration plate (until 2022): PD
- Website: chvojnica.eu

Chvojnica (Hungarian: Nyitrafenyves) is a village and municipality in Prievidza District in the Trenčín Region of western Slovakia.

== History ==
In historical records the village was first mentioned in 1614.

== Geography ==
The municipality lies at an altitude of 484 metres (1,588 ft) and covers an area of 9.30 km^{2} (3.59 sq mi) (2025).

== See also ==
- List of municipalities and towns in Slovakia

== Population ==
Population statistic (10 years)
Year	1995	2005	2015	2025
Count	203	232	260	224
Difference		+14.28%	+12.06%	−13.84%

Population statistic
Year	2024	2025
Count	224	224
Difference		−1.42%

It has a population of 224 people (31 December 2025).

=== Ethnicity ===
Census 2021 (1+ %)
Ethnicity	Number	Fraction
Slovak	232	95.86%
Romani	5	2.06%
Not found out	5	2.06%
Hungarian	5	2.06%
Total	242	

In year 2021 was 242 people by ethnicity 232 as Slovak, 5 as Romani, 5 as Not found out, 5 as Hungarian, 2 as Czech and 1 as Other.

Note on population: The difference values of population numbers in the table "Population statistic" and in the sections "Ethnicity" & "Religion" is caused by the use of various statistical methods.

=== Religion ===
Census 2021 (1+ %)
Religion	Number	Fraction
Roman Catholic Church	121	50%
None	113	46.69%
Not found out	3	1.24%
Total	242	

In year 2021 was 242 people by religion 121 from Roman Catholic Church, 113 from None, 3 from Not found out, 2 from Paganism and natural spirituality, 2 from Christian Congregations in Slovakia and 1 from United Methodist Church.

== Genealogical resources ==
The records for genealogical research are available at the state archive "Statny Archiv in Nitra, Slovakia"

- Roman Catholic church records (births/marriages/deaths): 1679-1903 (parish B)
