= Kocurany =

- Municipality
- Flag

- Location of Kocurany in the Trenčín Region Location of Kocurany in Slovakia
- Coordinates: 48.77°N 18.55°E
- Country: Slovakia
- Region: Trenčín Region
- District: Prievidza District
- First mentioned: 1113

Area
  - Total: 4.17 km^{2} (1.61 sq mi)
- Elevation: 310 m (1,020 ft)

Population (2025)
  - Total: 530
- Time zone: UTC+1 (CET)
  - Summer (DST): UTC+2 (CEST)
- Postal code: 972 02
- Area code: +421 46
- Vehicle registration plate (until 2022): PD
- Website: www.kocurany.sk

Kocurany (Hungarian: Kocurány) is a village and municipality in Prievidza District in the Trenčín Region of western Slovakia.

== History ==
In historical records the village was first mentioned in 1113.

== Geography ==
The municipality lies at an altitude of 310 metres (1,020 ft) and covers an area of 4.17 km^{2} (1.61 sq mi) (2025).

== Population ==
Population statistic (10 years)
Year	1995	2005	2015	2025
Count	344	404	497	530
Difference		+17.44%	+23.01%	+6.63%

Population statistic
Year	2024	2025
Count	528	530
Difference		+0.37%

It has a population of 530 people (31 December 2025).

=== Ethnicity ===
Census 2021 (1+ %)
Ethnicity	Number	Fraction
Slovak	506	96.74%
Not found out	14	2.67%
Total	523	

In year 2021 was 523 people by ethnicity 506 as Slovak, 14 as Not found out, 3 as Czech, 1 as Romani, 1 as Rusyn, 1 as Hungarian, 1 as Other and 1 as English.

Note on population: The difference values of population numbers in the table "Population statistic" and in the sections "Ethnicity" & "Religion" is caused by the use of various statistical methods.

=== Religion ===
Census 2021 (1+ %)
Religion	Number	Fraction
Roman Catholic Church	322	61.57%
None	168	32.12%
Not found out	18	3.44%
Total	523	

In year 2021 was 523 people by religion 322 from Roman Catholic Church, 168 from None, 18 from Not found out, 3 from Christian Congregations in Slovakia, 3 from Evangelical Church, 3 from Ad hoc movements, 2 from Jehovah's Witnesses, 2 from Other, 1 from Calvinist Church and 1 from Greek Catholic Church.

== Genealogical resources ==
The records for genealogical research are available at the state archive "Statny Archiv in Nitra, Slovakia"

- Roman Catholic church records (births/marriages/deaths): 1668-1912 (parish B)

== See also ==
- List of municipalities and towns in Slovakia
