= Nevidzany, Prievidza District =

Nevidzany
- Municipality
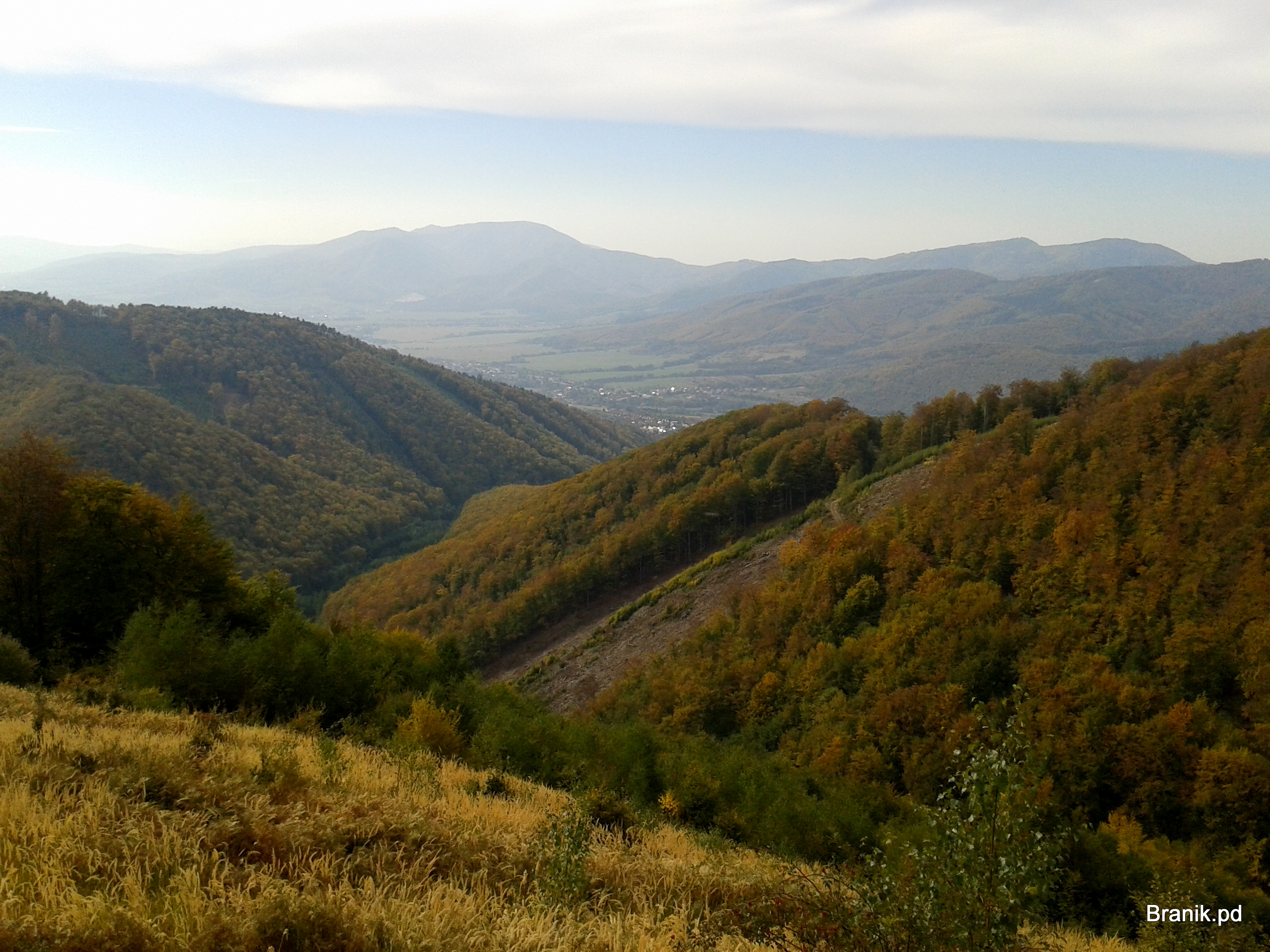

- Flag

- Location of Nevidzany in the Trenčín Region Location of Nevidzany in Slovakia
- Coordinates: 48°50′27″N 18°29′03″E
- Country: Slovakia
- Region: Trenčín Region
- District: Prievidza District
- First mentioned: 1229

Area
  - Total: 11.78 km^{2} (4.55 sq mi)
- Elevation: 406 m (1,332 ft)

Population (2025)
  - Total: 295
- Time zone: UTC+1 (CET)
  - Summer (DST): UTC+2 (CEST)
- Postal code: 972 27
- Area code: +421 46
- Vehicle registration plate (until 2022): PD
- Website: www.nevidzany-prievidza.sk

Nevidzany (Hungarian: Nevigyén) is a village and municipality in Prievidza District in the Trenčín Region of western Slovakia.

== History ==
In historical records the village was first mentioned in 1229.

== Geography ==
The municipality lies at an altitude of 406 metres (1,332 ft) and covers an area of 11.78 km^{2} (4.55 sq mi) (2025).

== Population ==
Population statistic (10 years)
Year	1995	2005	2015	2025
Count	307	298	306	295
Difference		−2.93%	+2.68%	−3.59%

Population statistic
Year	2024	2025
Count	298	295
Difference		−1.00%

It has a population of 295 people (31 December 2025).

=== Ethnicity ===
Census 2021 (1+ %)
Ethnicity	Number	Fraction
Slovak	300	98.68%
Not found out	5	1.64%
Total	304	

In year 2021 was 304 people by ethnicity 300 as Slovak, 5 as Not found out and 1 as French.

Note on population: The difference values of population numbers in the table "Population statistic" and in the sections "Ethnicity" & "Religion" is caused by the use of various statistical methods.

=== Religion ===
Census 2021 (1+ %)
Religion	Number	Fraction
Roman Catholic Church	250	82.24%
None	46	15.13%
Not found out	5	1.64%
Total	304	

In year 2021 was 304 people by religion 250 from Roman Catholic Church, 46 from None, 5 from Not found out, 2 from Other and 1 from Buddhism.
