= Podhradie, Prievidza District =

Podhradie
- Municipality
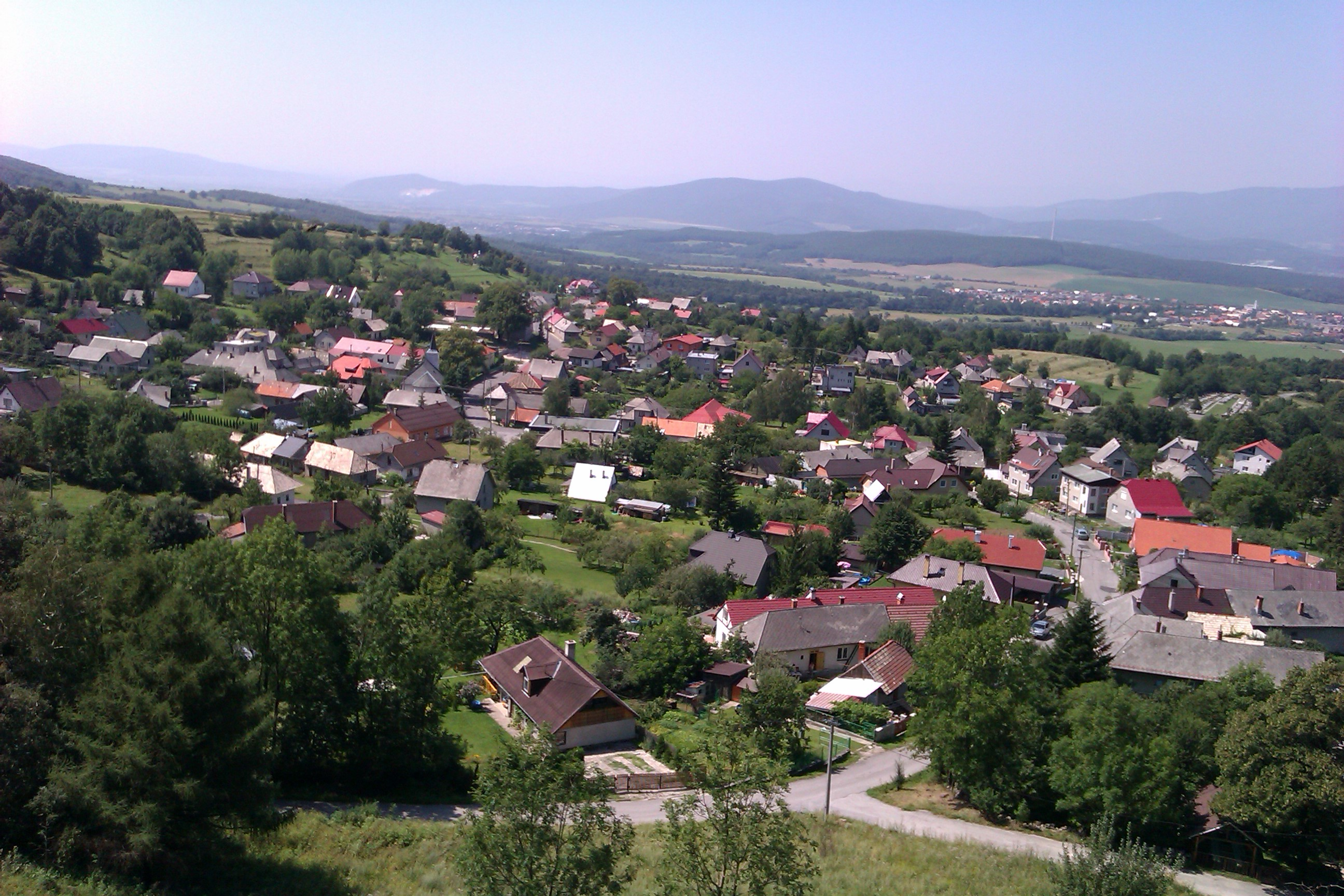

- Flag

- Location of Podhradie in the Trenčín Region Location of Podhradie in Slovakia
- Coordinates: 48°41′00″N 18°38′00″E
- Country: Slovakia
- Region: Trenčín Region
- District: Prievidza District
- First mentioned: 1352

Area
  - Total: 12.75 km^{2} (4.92 sq mi)
- Elevation: 549 m (1,801 ft)

Population (2025)
  - Total: 285
- Time zone: UTC+1 (CET)
  - Summer (DST): UTC+2 (CEST)
- Postal code: 972 42
- Area code: +421 46
- Vehicle registration plate (until 2022): PD
- Website: www.podhradie.eu

Podhradie (Hungarian: Keselőkő) is a village and municipality in Prievidza District in the Trenčín Region of western Slovakia.

== History ==
In historical records the village was first mentioned in 1352.

== Geography ==
The municipality lies at an altitude of 549 metres (1,801 ft) and covers an area of 12.75 km^{2} (4.92 sq mi) (2025).

== Population ==
Population statistic (10 years)
Year	1995	2005	2015	2025
Count	326	326	306	285
Difference		+0%	−6.13%	−6.86%

Population statistic
Year	2024	2025
Count	292	285
Difference		−2.39%

It has a population of 285 people (31 December 2025).

=== Ethnicity ===
Census 2021 (1+ %)
Ethnicity	Number	Fraction
Slovak	289	97.96%
Not found out	4	1.35%
Total	295	

In year 2021 was 295 people by ethnicity 289 as Slovak, 4 as Not found out, 1 as Czech, 1 as Ukrainian, 1 as Russian, 1 as Polish and 1 as German.

Note on population: The difference values of population numbers in the table "Population statistic" and in the sections "Ethnicity" & "Religion" is caused by the use of various statistical methods.

=== Religion ===
Census 2021 (1+ %)
Religion	Number	Fraction
Roman Catholic Church	194	65.76%
None	86	29.15%
Greek Catholic Church	6	2.03%
Not found out	5	1.69%
Evangelical Church	3	1.02%
Total	295	

In year 2021 was 295 people by religion 194 from Roman Catholic Church, 86 from None, 6 from Greek Catholic Church, 5 from Not found out, 3 from Evangelical Church and 1 from Baptists Church.
