= Lipník, Prievidza District =

Lipník
- Municipality
- Flag

- Location of Lipník in the Trenčín Region Location of Lipník in Slovakia
- Coordinates: 48°47′N 18°43′E
- Country: Slovakia
- Region: Trenčín Region
- District: Prievidza District
- First mentioned: 1432

Area
  - Total: 5.47 km^{2} (2.11 sq mi)
- Elevation: 333 m (1,093 ft)

Population (2025)
  - Total: 599
- Time zone: UTC+1 (CET)
  - Summer (DST): UTC+2 (CEST)
- Postal code: 972 32
- Area code: +421 46
- Vehicle registration plate (until 2022): PD
- Website: lipnik.sk

Lipník (Hungarian: Hársas) is a village and municipality in Prievidza District in the Trenčín Region of western Slovakia.

== History ==
In historical records, the village was first mentioned in 1432.

== Geography ==
The municipality lies at an altitude of 333 metres (1,093 ft) and covers an area of 5.47 km^{2} (2.11 sq mi) (2025).

== Population ==
Population statistic (10 years)
Year	1995	2005	2015	2025
Count	493	467	506	599
Difference		−5.27%	+8.35%	+18.37%

Population statistic
Year	2024	2025
Count	595	599
Difference		+0.67%

It has a population of 599 people (31 December 2025).

=== Ethnicity ===
Census 2021 (1+ %)
Ethnicity	Number	Fraction
Slovak	558	99.11%
Other	6	1.06%
Total	563	

In year 2021 was 563 people by ethnicity 558 as Slovak, 6 as Other, 2 as Hungarian, 1 as Russian, 1 as Not found out, 1 as German and 1 as Moravian.

Note on population: The difference values of population numbers in the table "Population statistic" and in the sections "Ethnicity" & "Religion" is caused by the use of various statistical methods.

=== Religion ===
Census 2021 (1+ %)
Religion	Number	Fraction
Roman Catholic Church	353	62.7%
None	191	33.93%
Total	563	

In year 2021 was 563 people by religion 353 from Roman Catholic Church, 191 from None, 5 from Evangelical Church, 3 from Greek Catholic Church, 3 from Ad hoc movements, 2 from Paganism and natural spirituality, 2 from Not found out, 2 from Christian Congregations in Slovakia and 2 from Buddhism.
