= Seč, Prievidza District =

Seč
- Municipality
- Flag

- Location of Seč in the Trenčín Region Location of Seč in Slovakia
- Coordinates: 48°49′N 18°30′E
- Country: Slovakia
- Region: Trenčín Region
- District: Prievidza District
- First mentioned: 1275

Area
  - Total: 7.65 km^{2} (2.95 sq mi)
- Elevation: 446 m (1,463 ft)

Population (2025)
  - Total: 392
- Time zone: UTC+1 (CET)
  - Summer (DST): UTC+2 (CEST)
- Postal code: 972 26
- Area code: +421 46
- Vehicle registration plate (until 2022): PD
- Website: obecsec.sk

Seč (Hungarian: Divékszécs) is a village and municipality in Prievidza District in the Trenčín Region of western Slovakia.

== History ==
In historical records the village was first mentioned in 1275.

== Geography ==
The municipality lies at an altitude of 446 metres (1,463 ft) and covers an area of 7.65 km^{2} (2.95 sq mi) (2025).

== Population ==
Population statistic (10 years)
Year	1995	2005	2015	2025
Count	413	405	390	392
Difference		−1.93%	−3.70%	+0.51%

Population statistic
Year	2024	2025
Count	388	392
Difference		+1.03%

It has a population of 392 people (31 December 2025).

=== Ethnicity ===
Census 2021 (1+ %)
Ethnicity	Number	Fraction
Slovak	394	100%
Total	394	

In year 2021 was 394 people by ethnicity 394 as Slovak, 1 as Jewish, 1 as Czech, 1 as Rusyn, 1 as Hungarian and 1 as Albanian.

Note on population: The difference values of population numbers in the table "Population statistic" and in the sections "Ethnicity" & "Religion" is caused by the use of various statistical methods.

=== Religion ===
Census 2021 (1+ %)
Religion	Number	Fraction
Roman Catholic Church	297	75.38%
None	84	21.32%
Not found out	7	1.78%
Total	394	

In year 2021 was 394 people by religion 297 from Roman Catholic Church, 84 from None, 7 from Not found out, 3 from Evangelical Church, 1 from Paganism and natural spirituality, 1 from Christian Congregations in Slovakia and 1 from Greek Catholic Church.
