= Horné Vestenice =

- Municipality
- Flag

- Location of Horné Vestenice in the Trenčín Region Location of Horné Vestenice in Slovakia
- Coordinates: 48.72°N 18.43°E
- Country: Slovakia
- Region: Trenčín Region
- District: Prievidza District
- First mentioned: 1332

Area
  - Total: 9.96 km^{2} (3.85 sq mi)
- Elevation: 255 m (837 ft)

Population (2025)
  - Total: 609
- Time zone: UTC+1 (CET)
  - Summer (DST): UTC+2 (CEST)
- Postal code: 972 22
- Area code: +421 46
- Vehicle registration plate (until 2022): PD
- Website: hornevestenice.sk

Horné Vestenice (Hungarian: Felsővesztény) is a village and municipality in Prievidza District in the Trenčín Region of western Slovakia.

== History ==
In historical records the village was first mentioned in 1332.

== Geography ==
The municipality lies at an altitude of 255 metres (837 ft) and covers an area of 9.96 km^{2} (3.85 sq mi) (2025).

== Population ==
Population statistic (10 years)
Year	1995	2005	2015	2025
Count	616	617	609	609
Difference		+0.16%	−1.29%	+0%

Population statistic
Year	2024	2025
Count	620	609
Difference		−1.77%

It has a population of 609 people (31 December 2025).

=== Ethnicity ===
Census 2021 (1+ %)
Ethnicity	Number	Fraction
Slovak	597	94.91%
Not found out	25	3.97%
Total	629	

In year 2021 was 629 people by ethnicity 597 as Slovak, 25 as Not found out, 6 as Czech, 4 as Russian, 2 as Hungarian, 2 as Other, 1 as Romani and 1 as Rusyn.

Note on population: The difference values of population numbers in the table "Population statistic" and in the sections "Ethnicity" & "Religion" is caused by the use of various statistical methods.

=== Religion ===
Census 2021 (1+ %)
Religion	Number	Fraction
Roman Catholic Church	496	78.86%
None	85	13.51%
Not found out	26	4.13%
Total	629	

In year 2021 was 629 people by religion 496 from Roman Catholic Church, 85 from None, 26 from Not found out, 5 from Other and not ascertained christian church, 4 from Christian Congregations in Slovakia, 3 from Eastern Orthodox Church, 3 from Ad hoc movements, 2 from Jehovah's Witnesses, 2 from Greek Catholic Church, 2 from Evangelical Church and 1 from Baptists Church.

== Genealogical resources ==
The records for genealogical research are available at the state archive "Statny Archiv in Nitra, Slovakia"

- Roman Catholic church records (births/marriages/deaths): 1702-1935 (parish A)

== See also ==
- List of municipalities and towns in Slovakia
