= Liešťany =

- Municipality
- Flag

- Location of Liešťany in the Trenčín Region Location of Liešťany in Slovakia
- Coordinates: 48.82°N 18.48°E
- Country: Slovakia
- Region: Trenčín Region
- District: Prievidza District
- First mentioned: 1332

Area
  - Total: 16.41 km^{2} (6.34 sq mi)
- Elevation: 343 m (1,125 ft)

Population (2025)
  - Total: 1,172
- Time zone: UTC+1 (CET)
  - Summer (DST): UTC+2 (CEST)
- Postal code: 972 27
- Area code: +421 46
- Vehicle registration plate (until 2022): PD
- Website: www.liestany.sk

Liešťany (Slovak pronunciation: [ˈlɪeʂcani]; Hungarian: Lestyén) is a village and municipality in Prievidza District in the Trenčín Region of western Slovakia.

== History ==
In historical records the village was first mentioned in 1332.

== Geography ==
The municipality lies at an altitude of 343 metres (1,125 ft) and covers an area of 16.41 km^{2} (6.34 sq mi) (2025).

== Population ==
Population statistic (10 years)
Year	1995	2005	2015	2025
Count	1177	1233	1228	1172
Difference		+4.75%	−0.40%	−4.56%

Population statistic
Year	2024	2025
Count	1169	1172
Difference		+0.25%

It has a population of 1172 people (31 December 2025).

=== Ethnicity ===
Census 2021 (1+ %)
Ethnicity	Number	Fraction
Slovak	1181	98.08%
Not found out	25	2.07%
Total	1204	

In year 2021 was 1204 people by ethnicity 1181 as Slovak, 25 as Not found out, 9 as Czech, 4 as Other, 3 as Greek, 2 as Ukrainian, 1 as Jewish, 1 as Rusyn, 1 as German and 1 as Hungarian.

Note on population: The difference values of population numbers in the table "Population statistic" and in the sections "Ethnicity" & "Religion" is caused by the use of various statistical methods.

=== Religion ===
Census 2021 (1+ %)
Religion	Number	Fraction
Roman Catholic Church	968	80.4%
None	172	14.29%
Not found out	30	2.49%
Greek Catholic Church	14	1.16%
Total	1204	

In year 2021 was 1204 people by religion 968 from Roman Catholic Church, 172 from None, 30 from Not found out, 14 from Greek Catholic Church, 6 from Evangelical Church, 3 from Christian Congregations in Slovakia, 3 from Islam, 3 from Other, 2 from Seventh-day Adventist Church, 1 from Other and not ascertained christian church, 1 from Church of Jesus Christ of Latter-day Saints and 1 from Baptists Church.
