= Kľačno =

- Municipality
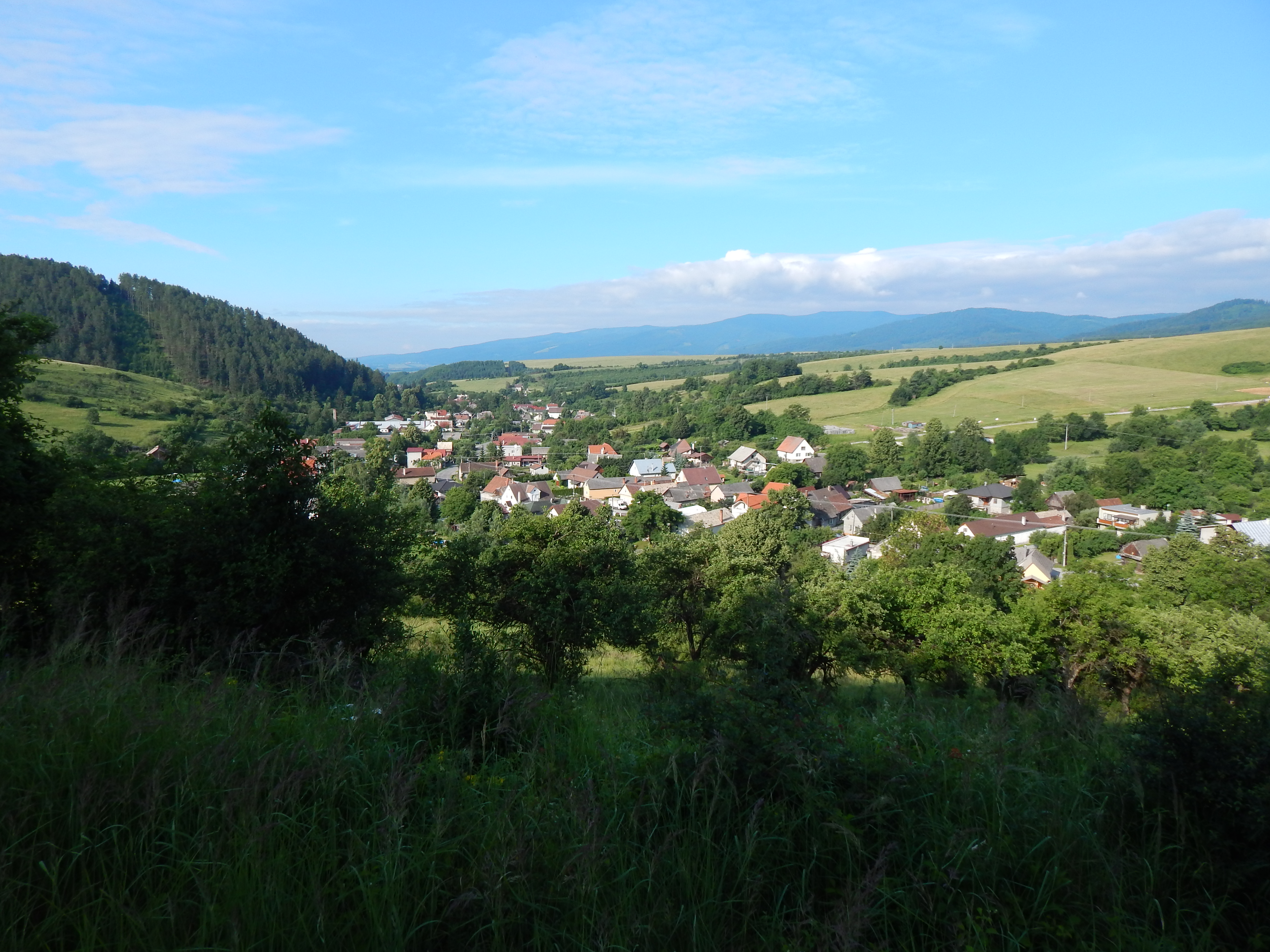

- Flag

- Location of Kľačno in the Trenčín Region Location of Kľačno in Slovakia
- Coordinates: 48.91°N 18.66°E
- Country: Slovakia
- Region: Trenčín Region
- District: Prievidza District
- First mentioned: 1413

Area
  - Total: 48.69 km^{2} (18.80 sq mi)
- Elevation: 400 m (1,300 ft)

Population (2025)
  - Total: 1,074
- Time zone: UTC+1 (CET)
  - Summer (DST): UTC+2 (CEST)
- Postal code: 972 15
- Area code: +421 46
- Vehicle registration plate (until 2022): PD
- Website: www.klacno.eu

Kľačno (German: Gaidel; Hungarian: Nyitrafő) is a village and municipality in Prievidza District in the Trenčín Region of western Slovakia.

== History ==
In historical records the village was first mentioned in 1413.

The village once belonged to the German language island of Hauerland but the majority of the German population was expelled at the end of World War II.

== Geography ==
The municipality lies at an altitude of 400 metres (1,300 ft) and covers an area of 48.69 km^{2} (18.80 sq mi) (2025).

== Population ==
Population statistic (10 years)
Year	1995	2005	2015	2025
Count	1088	1100	1112	1074
Difference		+1.10%	+1.09%	−3.41%

Population statistic
Year	2024	2025
Count	1076	1074
Difference		−0.18%

It has a population of 1074 people (31 December 2025).

=== Ethnicity ===
Census 2021 (1+ %)
Ethnicity	Number	Fraction
Slovak	1007	94.2%
German	42	3.92%
Not found out	35	3.27%
Total	1069	

In year 2021 was 1069 people by ethnicity 1007 as Slovak, 42 as German, 35 as Not found out, 7 as Czech, 4 as Ukrainian, 4 as Romani, 3 as Austrian, 2 as Greek, 1 as Jewish, 1 as Russian, 1 as Polish, 1 as Hungarian, 1 as English and 1 as Albanian.

Note on population: The difference values of population numbers in the table "Population statistic" and in the sections "Ethnicity" & "Religion" is caused by the use of various statistical methods.

=== Religion ===
Census 2021 (1+ %)
Religion	Number	Fraction
Roman Catholic Church	614	57.44%
None	358	33.49%
Not found out	31	2.9%
Greek Catholic Church	18	1.68%
Evangelical Church	18	1.68%
Other and not ascertained christian church	12	1.12%
Total	1069	

In year 2021 was 1069 people by religion 614 from Roman Catholic Church, 358 from None, 31 from Not found out, 18 from Greek Catholic Church, 18 from Evangelical Church, 12 from Other and not ascertained christian church, 6 from Christian Congregations in Slovakia, 4 from Other, 3 from Calvinist Church, 2 from Seventh-day Adventist Church, 1 from Islam, 1 from Buddhism and 1 from Ad hoc movements.

== Genealogical resources ==
The records for genealogical research are available at the state archive "Statny Archiv in Nitra, Slovakia"

- Roman Catholic church records (births/marriages/deaths): 1785-1911 (parish A)

== See also ==
- List of municipalities and towns in Slovakia
