= Čavoj =

- Municipality
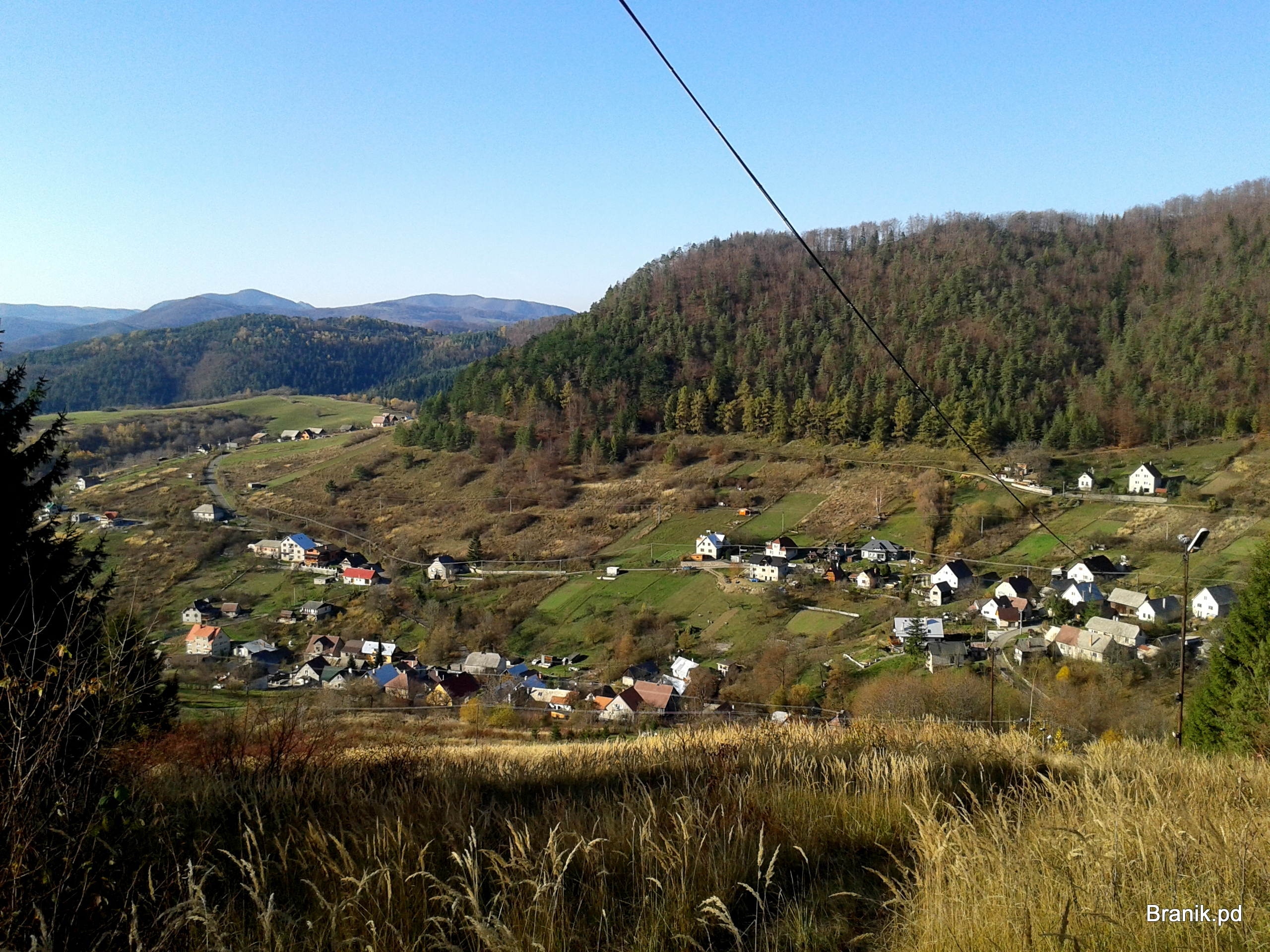

- Flag

- Location of Čavoj in the Trenčín Region Location of Čavoj in Slovakia
- Coordinates: 48.88°N 18.48°E
- Country: Slovakia
- Region: Trenčín Region
- District: Prievidza District
- First mentioned: 1364

Area
  - Total: 15.24 km^{2} (5.88 sq mi)
- Elevation: 580 m (1,900 ft)

Population (2025)
  - Total: 492
- Time zone: UTC+1 (CET)
  - Summer (DST): UTC+2 (CEST)
- Postal code: 972 29
- Area code: +421 46
- Vehicle registration plate (until 2022): PD
- Website: cavoj.sk

Čavoj (Hungarian: Csavajó) is a village and municipality in Prievidza District in the Trenčín Region of western Slovakia.

== History ==
In historical records the village was first mentioned in 1364.

== Geography ==
The municipality lies at an altitude of 580 metres (1,900 ft) and covers an area of 15.24 km^{2} (5.88 sq mi) (2025).

== Population ==
Population statistic (10 years)
Year	1995	2005	2015	2025
Count	680	571	498	492
Difference		−16.02%	−12.78%	−1.20%

Population statistic
Year	2024	2025
Count	497	492
Difference		−1.00%

It has a population of 492 people (31 December 2025).

=== Ethnicity ===
Census 2021 (1+ %)
Ethnicity	Number	Fraction
Slovak	481	98.56%
Not found out	6	1.22%
Total	488	

In year 2021 was 488 people by ethnicity 481 as Slovak, 6 as Not found out, 2 as Czech, 1 as Jewish and 1 as Russian.

Note on population: The difference values of population numbers in the table "Population statistic" and in the sections "Ethnicity" & "Religion" is caused by the use of various statistical methods.

=== Religion ===
Census 2021 (1+ %)
Religion	Number	Fraction
Roman Catholic Church	405	82.99%
None	62	12.7%
Not found out	11	2.25%
Total	488	

In year 2021 was 488 people by religion 405 from Roman Catholic Church, 62 from None, 11 from Not found out, 2 from Greek Catholic Church, 2 from Ad hoc movements, 1 from Calvinist Church, 1 from Eastern Orthodox Church, 1 from Paganism and natural spirituality, 1 from Jehovah's Witnesses, 1 from Christian Congregations in Slovakia and 1 from Other.

== Genealogical resources ==
The records for genealogical research are available at the state archive "Statny Archiv in Nitra, Slovakia"

- Roman Catholic church records (births/marriages/deaths): 1865-1901 (parish A)

== See also ==
- List of municipalities and towns in Slovakia
