= Šútovce =

Village and municipality in Slovakia

- Municipality
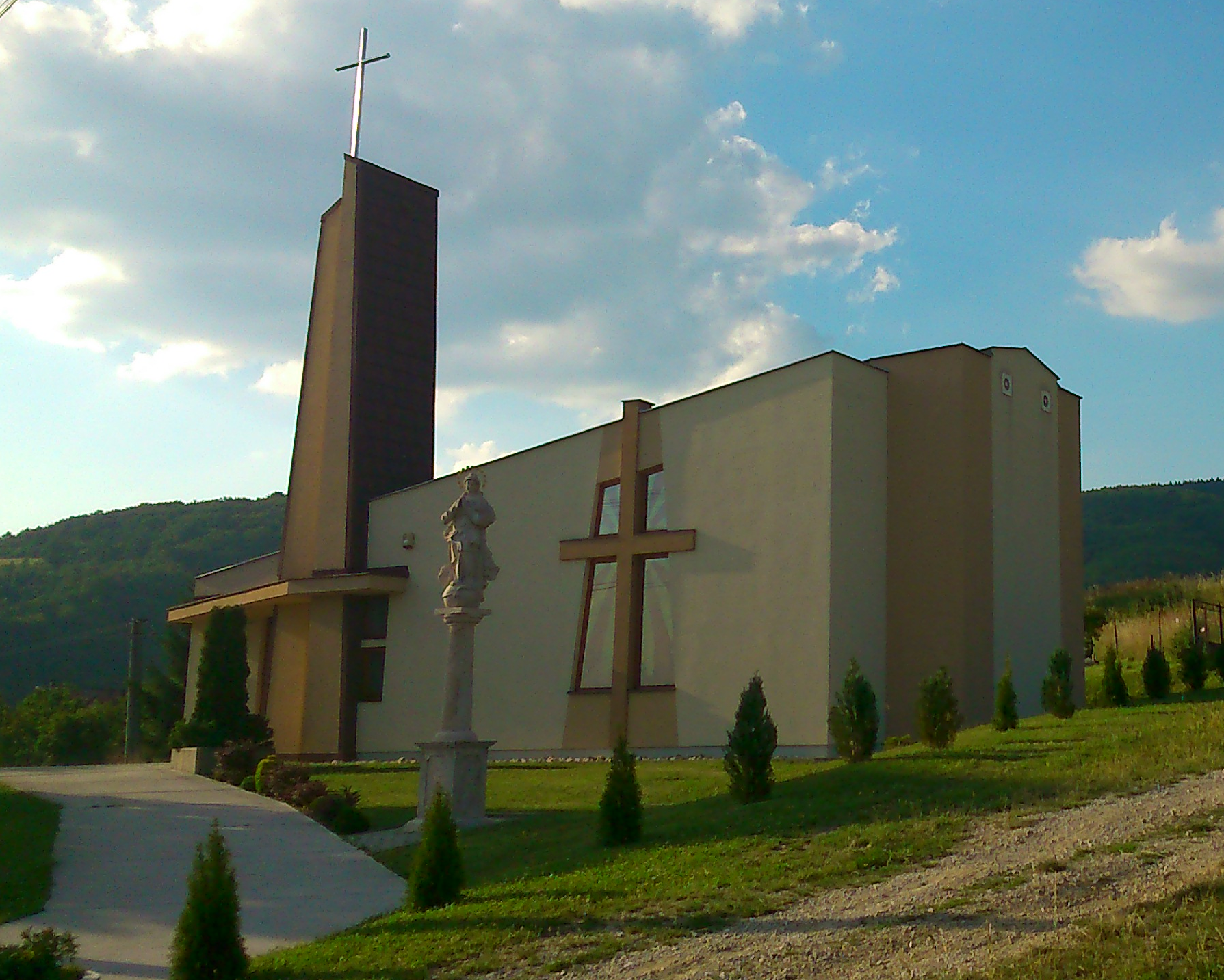

- Flag

- Location of Šútovce in the Trenčín Region Location of Šútovce in Slovakia
- Coordinates: 48.80°N 18.53°E
- Country: Slovakia
- Region: Trenčín Region
- District: Prievidza District
- First mentioned: 1315

Area
  - Total: 7.08 km^{2} (2.73 sq mi)
- Elevation: 434 m (1,424 ft)

Population (2025)
  - Total: 461
- Time zone: UTC+1 (CET)
  - Summer (DST): UTC+2 (CEST)
- Postal code: 972 01
- Area code: +421 46
- Vehicle registration plate (until 2022): PD

Šútovce (Slovak pronunciation: [ˈʂuːtɔwtse]; Hungarian: Sújtó) is a village and municipality in Prievidza District in the Trenčín Region of western Slovakia.

== History ==
In historical records the village was first mentioned in 1315.

== Geography ==
The municipality lies at an altitude of 434 metres (1,424 ft) and covers an area of 7.08 km^{2} (2.73 sq mi) (2025).

== Population ==
Population statistic (10 years)
| Year | 1995 | 2005 | 2015 | 2025 |
|---|---|---|---|---|
| Count | 382 | 410 | 440 | 461 |
| Difference | | +7.32% | +7.31% | +4.77% |

Population statistic
| Year | 2024 | 2025 |
|---|---|---|
| Count | 459 | 461 |
| Difference | | +0.43% |

It has a population of 461 people (31 December 2025).

=== Ethnicity ===
Census 2021 (1+ %)
| Ethnicity | Number | Fraction |
|---|---|---|
| Slovak | 439 | 98.87% |
| Total | 444 | |

In year 2021 was 444 people by ethnicity 439 as Slovak, 4 as Not found out, 2 as Czech and 1 as Ukrainian.

Note on population: The difference values of population numbers in the table "Population statistic" and in the sections "Ethnicity" & "Religion" is caused by the use of various statistical methods.

=== Religion ===
Census 2021 (1+ %)
| Religion | Number | Fraction |
|---|---|---|
| Roman Catholic Church | 313 | 70.5% |
| None | 110 | 24.77% |
| Not found out | 9 | 2.03% |
| Evangelical Church | 8 | 1.8% |
| Total | 444 | |

In year 2021 was 444 people by religion 313 from Roman Catholic Church, 110 from None, 9 from Not found out, 8 from Evangelical Church, 1 from Eastern Orthodox Church, 1 from Greek Catholic Church, 1 from United Methodist Church and 1 from Ad hoc movements.
