= Poluvsie =

- Municipality
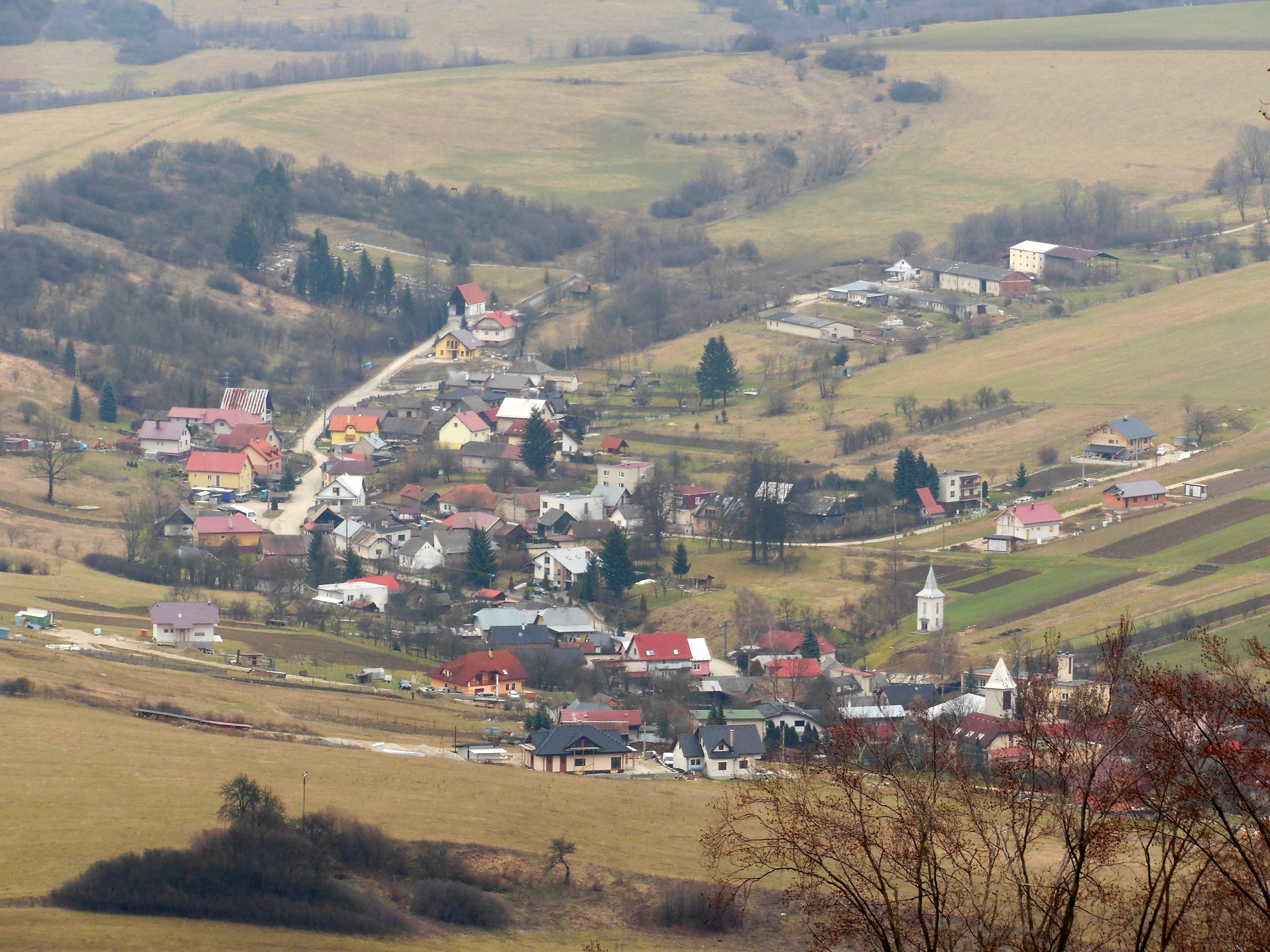

- Flag

- Location of Poluvsie in the Trenčín Region Location of Poluvsie in Slovakia
- Coordinates: 48.84°N 18.64°E
- Country: Slovakia
- Region: Trenčín Region
- District: Prievidza District
- First mentioned: 1358

Area
  - Total: 2.16 km^{2} (0.83 sq mi)
- Elevation: 310 m (1,020 ft)

Population (2025)
  - Total: 532
- Time zone: UTC+1 (CET)
  - Summer (DST): UTC+2 (CEST)
- Postal code: 972 16
- Area code: +421 46
- Vehicle registration plate (until 2022): PD
- Website: poluvsie.estranky.sk

Poluvsie (Hungarian: Erdőrét) is a village and municipality in Prievidza District in the Trenčín Region of western Slovakia.

== History ==
In historical records, the village was first mentioned in 1358.

Poluvsie (then known by its Hungarian name Erdoret) was the birthplace of Josef Gabčík (1912-1942), a participant in The assassination of Reinhard Heydrich.

== Geography ==
The municipality lies at an altitude of 310 metres (1,020 ft) and covers an area of 2.16 km^{2} (0.83 sq mi) (2025).

== Population ==
Population statistic (10 years)
Year	1995	2005	2015	2025
Count	543	562	590	532
Difference		+3.49%	+4.98%	−9.83%

Population statistic
Year	2024	2025
Count	537	532
Difference		−0.93%

It has a population of 532 people (31 December 2025).

=== Ethnicity ===
Census 2021 (1+ %)
Ethnicity	Number	Fraction
Slovak	512	95.7%
Not found out	19	3.55%
German	6	1.12%
Total	535	

In year 2021 was 535 people by ethnicity 512 as Slovak, 19 as Not found out, 6 as German, 4 as Polish, 2 as Hungarian, 2 as Other, 1 as Czech, 1 as Vietnamese, 1 as Italian and 1 as Russian.

Note on population: The difference values of population numbers in the table "Population statistic" and in the sections "Ethnicity" & "Religion" is caused by the use of various statistical methods.

=== Religion ===
Census 2021 (1+ %)
Religion	Number	Fraction
Roman Catholic Church	337	62.99%
None	158	29.53%
Not found out	23	4.3%
Christian Congregations in Slovakia	6	1.12%
Total	535	

In year 2021 was 535 people by religion 337 from Roman Catholic Church, 158 from None, 23 from Not found out, 6 from Christian Congregations in Slovakia, 3 from Greek Catholic Church, 2 from Other and not ascertained christian church, 2 from Other, 1 from Calvinist Church, 1 from Eastern Orthodox Church, 1 from Evangelical Church and 1 from Ad hoc movements.
