= Andrés Villena =

Spanish volleyball player (born 1993)

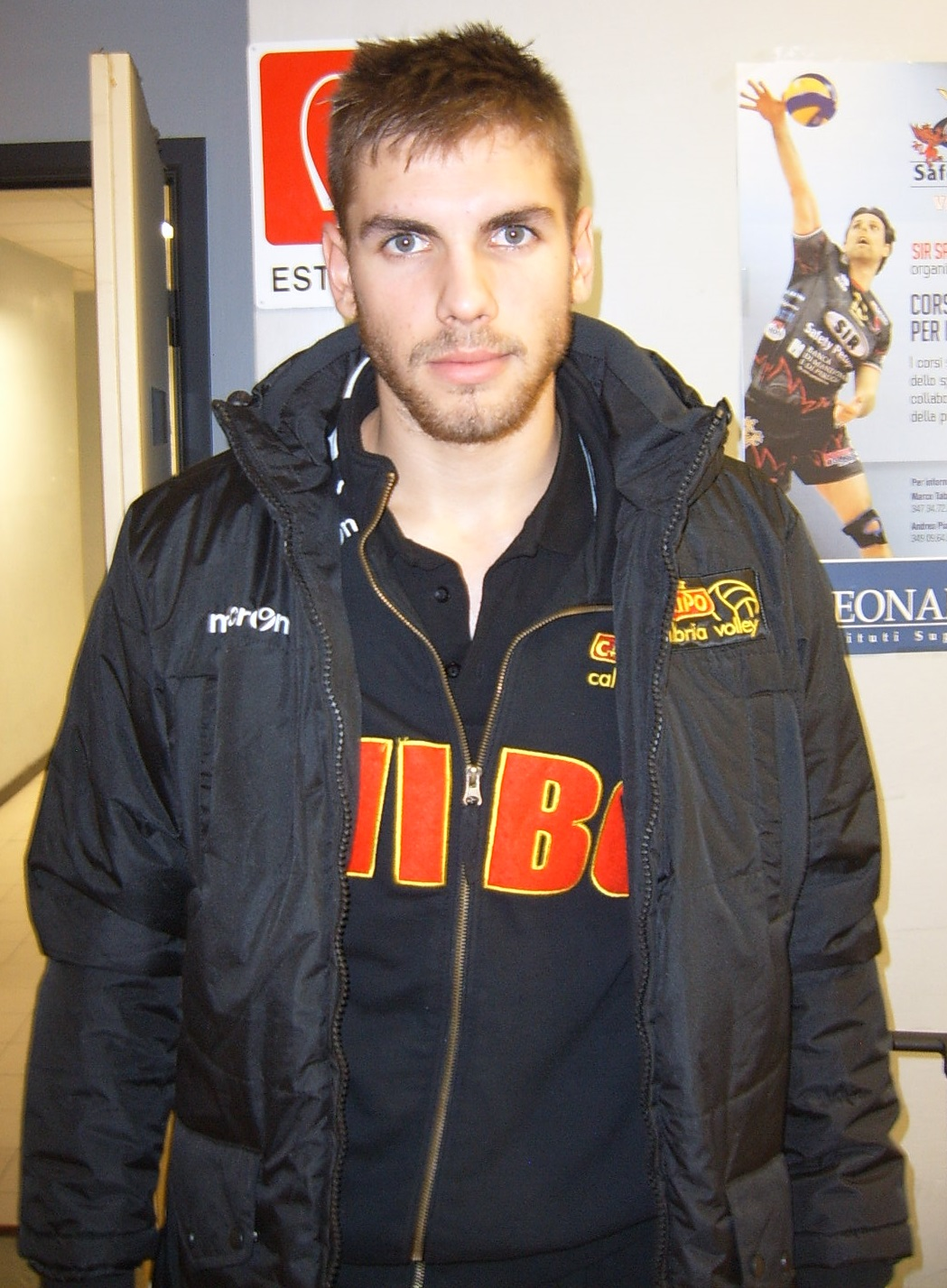

Personal information
- Full name: Andres Jesús Villena Rodríguez
- Nationality: Spanish
- Born: 27 February 1993 (age 33); San Roque, Spain
- Height: 1.95 m (6 ft 5 in)
- Weight: 88 kg (194 lb)
- Spike: 356 cm (140 in)
- Block: 330 cm (130 in)

Volleyball information
- Position: Opposite
- Current club: Zamalek SC

Career
Years	Teams
2010–2013; 2013–2014; 2014–2015; 2015–2016; 2016–2017; 2017–2018; 2018–2019; 2019–2020; 2021–2022; 2022– 2022-	CV Almería; Volley Callipo; Domar Matera; CV Almería; Urbia Voley Palma; Spacer's de Toulouse; CV Teruel; Incheon Korean Air Jumbos; CV Teruel; Zamalek SC; Uijeongbu KB Insurance Stars

National team
Spain
Honours
Men's volleyball
Representing Spain
Mediterranean Games
Silver medal – second place	2018 Tarragona
Silver medal – second place	2022 Oran

Andres Jesús Villena Rodríguez (born 27 February 1993) is a Spanish professional volleyball player. He is a member of the Spain national team. At the professional club level, he plays for Zamalek SC, and the Uijeongbu KB Insurance Stars.

== Honours ==
=== Clubs ===
- National championships
  - 2010/2011 Spanish SuperCup, with Unicaja Almería
  - 2011/2012 Spanish SuperCup, with Unicaja Almería
  - 2012/2013 Spanish Championship, with Unicaja Almería
  - 2015/2016 Spanish SuperCup, with Unicaja Almería
  - 2015/2016 Spanish Cup, with Unicaja Almería
  - 2015/2016 Spanish Championship, with Unicaja Almería
  - 2016/2017 Spanish Cup, with Urbia Voley Palma
  - 2016/2017 Spanish Championship, with Urbia Voley Palma
  - 2017/2018 Spanish Cup, with CV Teruel
  - 2017/2018 Spanish Championship, with CV Teruel
  - 2018/2019 Spanish SuperCup, with CV Teruel
  - 2018/2019 Spanish Championship, with CV Teruel
  - 2019/2020 KOVO Cup, with Incheon Korean Air Jumbos

=== Youth national team ===
- 2011 FIVB U19 World Championship
- 2012 CEV U20 European Championship

=== Individual awards ===
- 2011: CEV U19 European Championship – Best Server
- 2011: FIVB U19 World Championship – Best Scorer
- 2012: CEV U20 European Championship – Best Scorer
- 2012: CEV U20 European Championship – Best Spiker
- 2018: Spanish SuperCup – Most Valuable Player
- 2020: KOVO Cup – Most Valuable Player
