= Marcelo Méndez (volleyball) =

Argentine volleyball player and coach

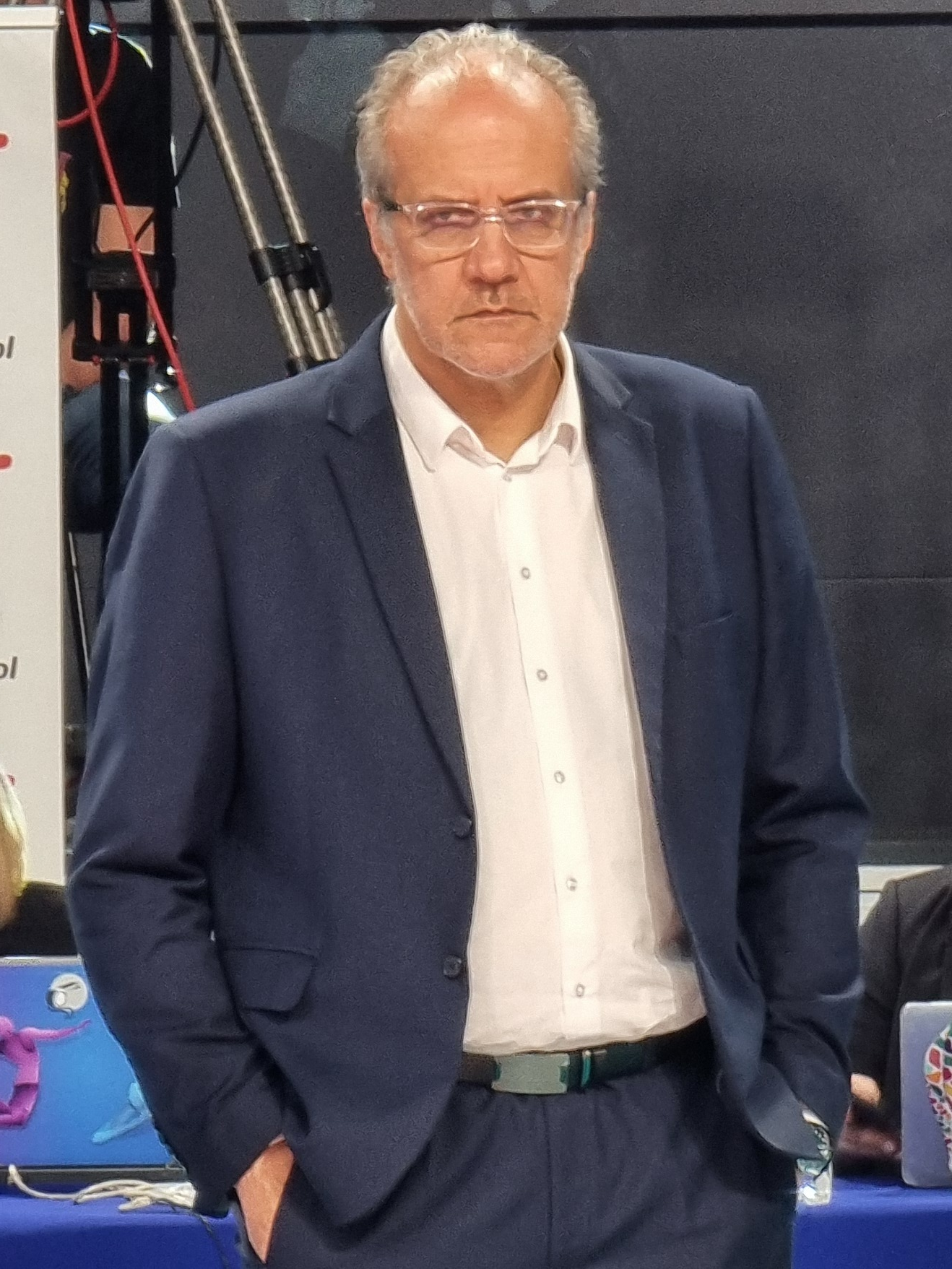
- Méndez as Jastrzębski Węgiel head coach in 2024

Personal information
- Full name: Marcelo Rodolfo Méndez
- Born: 20 June 1964 (age 62); Buenos Aires, Argentina
- Height: 1.98 m (6 ft 6 in)

Coaching information
- Current team: Trentino Volley
Previous teams coached
Years	Teams
1992–2004; 2004–2005; 2005–2009; 2007–2008; 2009; 2009–2021; 2018–2025; 2021–2022; 2022–2025; 2025–	River Plate; CV Pòrtol (AC); CV Pòrtol; Spain; Montes Claros Vôlei; Sada Cruzeiro; Argentina; Asseco Resovia; Jastrzębski Węgiel; Trentino Volley

Volleyball information
- Position: Middle blocker
Honours
Men's volleyball
Head coach Argentina
Olympic Games
Bronze medal – third place	2020 Tokyo
CSV South American Championship
Gold medal – first place	2023 Recife
Silver medal – second place	2019 Chile
Silver medal – second place	2021 Brasília

Marcelo Rodolfo Méndez (born 20 June 1964) is an Argentine professional volleyball coach and former player, playing as a middle blocker during his career. He serves as head coach for Trentino Volley.

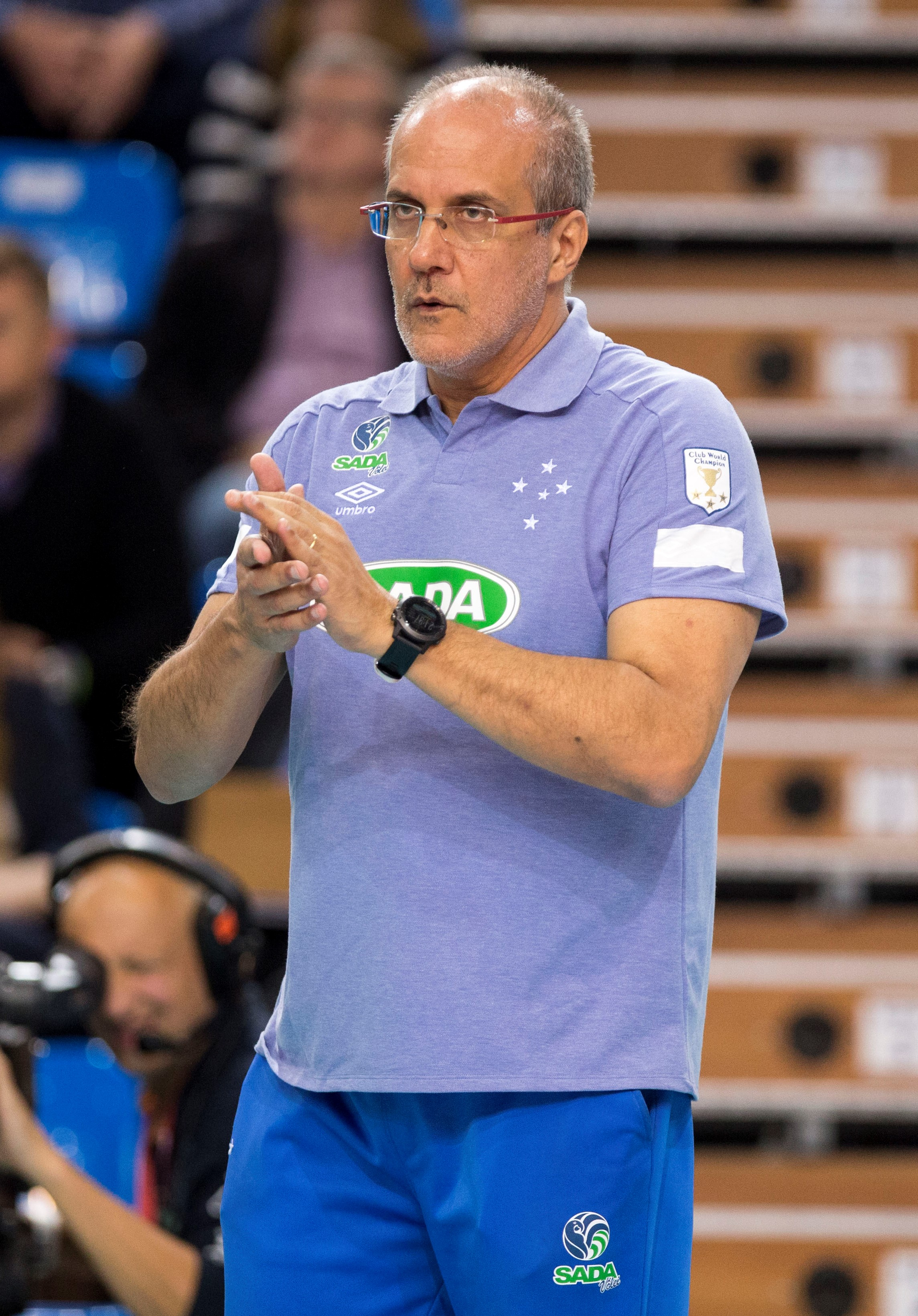
Méndez as Sada Cruzeiro head coach.

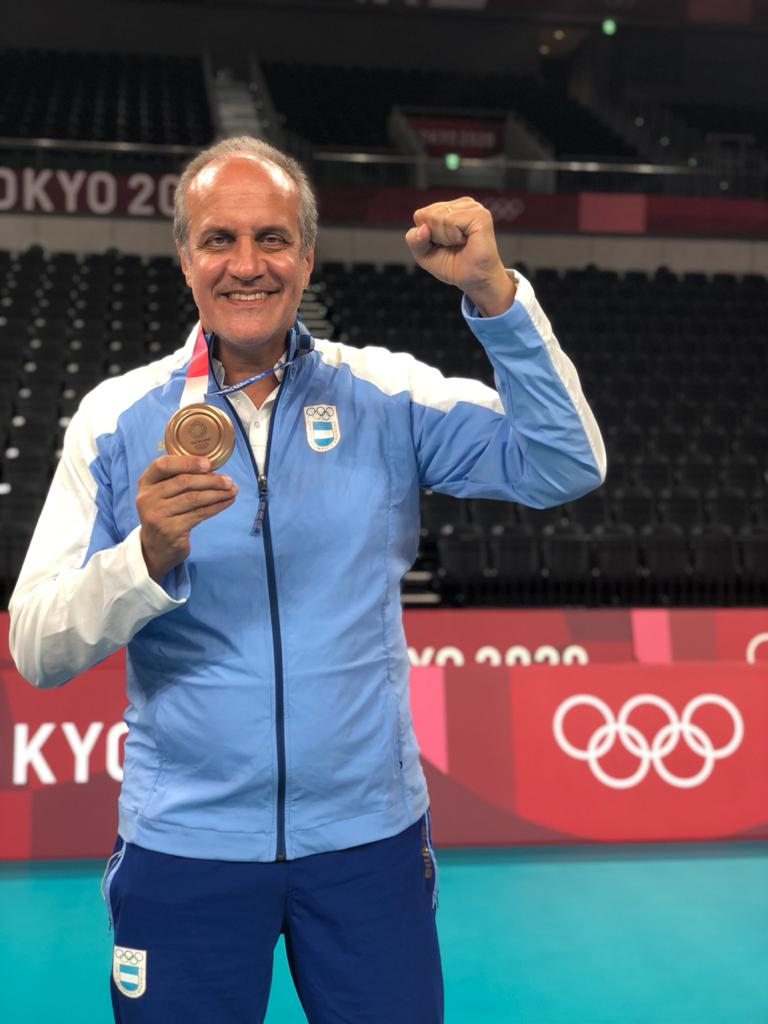
Méndez, Tokyo 2020

== Personal life ==
Marcelo Méndez was born in Buenos Aires and began playing volleyball at the age of 12. He married his wife, María Livia in 1988, and has two sons who are playing volleyball professionally, Nicolás and Juan.

== Career ==
=== As a coach ===
In 2004, Marcelo Méndez became an assistant coach of the Spanish team, CV Pòrtol, and the head coach of the same club in 2005. During his four-year work at the club, his team won three Spanish Champion titles, one Spanish Cup and three Supercups. On the international stage, the team led by Méndez managed to reach the final of the 2006 CEV Cup, losing there to Copra Berni Piacenza.

From 2007 to 2008, he served as head coach for the Spain national team.

In 2009, he took charge of Sada Cruzeiro. While being the coach of Sada Cruzeiro for over 10 years, he won three Club World Champion titles, seven South American Club Champion titles and six Brazilian Champion titles what makes him one of the world`s most successful club volleyball coaches. In March 2021, Mendez announced that he is leaving Sada Cruzeiro at the end of the season.

In 2018, he was appointed head coach of the Argentina national team. At the 2020 Summer Olympics, he led Argentina to its second bronze medal in history, having beaten Brazil in a third place match (3–2).

On 28 December 2021, he was appointed new head coach of Asseco Resovia, replacing Alberto Giuliani. Mendez finished his work with Resovia in 2022, and ended the 2021–22 PlusLiga season in fifth place. For the next PlusLiga season, he moved to Jastrzębski Węgiel.

== Honours ==
=== Club ===
- CEV Champions League
  - 2022–23 – with Jastrzębski Węgiel
  - 2023–24 – with Jastrzębski Węgiel
- FIVB Club World Championship
  - Betim 2013 – with Sada Cruzeiro
  - Betim 2015 – with Sada Cruzeiro
  - Betim 2016 – with Sada Cruzeiro
- CSV South American Club Championship
  - Linares 2012 – with Sada Cruzeiro
  - Belo Horizonte 2014 – with Sada Cruzeiro
  - Taubate 2016 – with Sada Cruzeiro
  - Montes Claros 2017 – with Sada Cruzeiro
  - Montes Claros 2018 – with Sada Cruzeiro
  - Belo Horizonte 2019 – with Sada Cruzeiro
  - Contagem 2020 – with Sada Cruzeiro
- Domestic
  - 1998–99 Argentine Championship, with River Plate
  - 2005–06 Spanish SuperCup, with CV Pòrtol
  - 2005–06 Spanish Cup, with CV Pòrtol
  - 2005–06 Spanish Championship, with CV Pòrtol
  - 2006–07 Spanish Championship, with CV Pòrtol
  - 2007–08 Spanish SuperCup, with CV Pòrtol
  - 2007–08 Spanish Championship, with CV Pòrtol
  - 2008–09 Spanish SuperCup, with CV Pòrtol
  - 2011–12 Brazilian Championship, with Sada Cruzeiro
  - 2013–14 Brazilian Cup, with Sada Cruzeiro
  - 2013–14 Brazilian Championship, with Sada Cruzeiro
  - 2014–15 Brazilian Championship, with Sada Cruzeiro
  - 2015–16 Brazilian Cup, with Sada Cruzeiro
  - 2015–16 Brazilian SuperCup, with Sada Cruzeiro
  - 2015–16 Brazilian Championship, with Sada Cruzeiro
  - 2016–17 Brazilian SuperCup, with Sada Cruzeiro
  - 2016–17 Brazilian Championship, with Sada Cruzeiro
  - 2017–18 Brazilian SuperCup, with Sada Cruzeiro
  - 2017–18 Brazilian Cup, with Sada Cruzeiro
  - 2017–18 Brazilian Championship, with Sada Cruzeiro
  - 2018–19 Brazilian Cup, with Sada Cruzeiro
  - 2019–20 Brazilian Cup, with Sada Cruzeiro
  - 2020–21 Brazilian Cup, with Sada Cruzeiro
  - 2022–23 Polish SuperCup, with Jastrzębski Węgiel
  - 2022–23 Polish Championship, with Jastrzębski Węgiel
  - 2023–24 Polish Championship, with Jastrzębski Węgiel
  - 2024–25 Polish Cup, with Jastrzębski Węgiel

Sporting positions
Preceded by (Argentina) Julio Velasco	Head coach of Argentina; 2018–2025	Succeeded by (Argentina) Horacio Dileo
Preceded by (Italy) Andrea Anastasi	Head coach of Spain; 2007–2008	Succeeded by (Argentina) Julio Velasco
