= Volleyball in Spain =

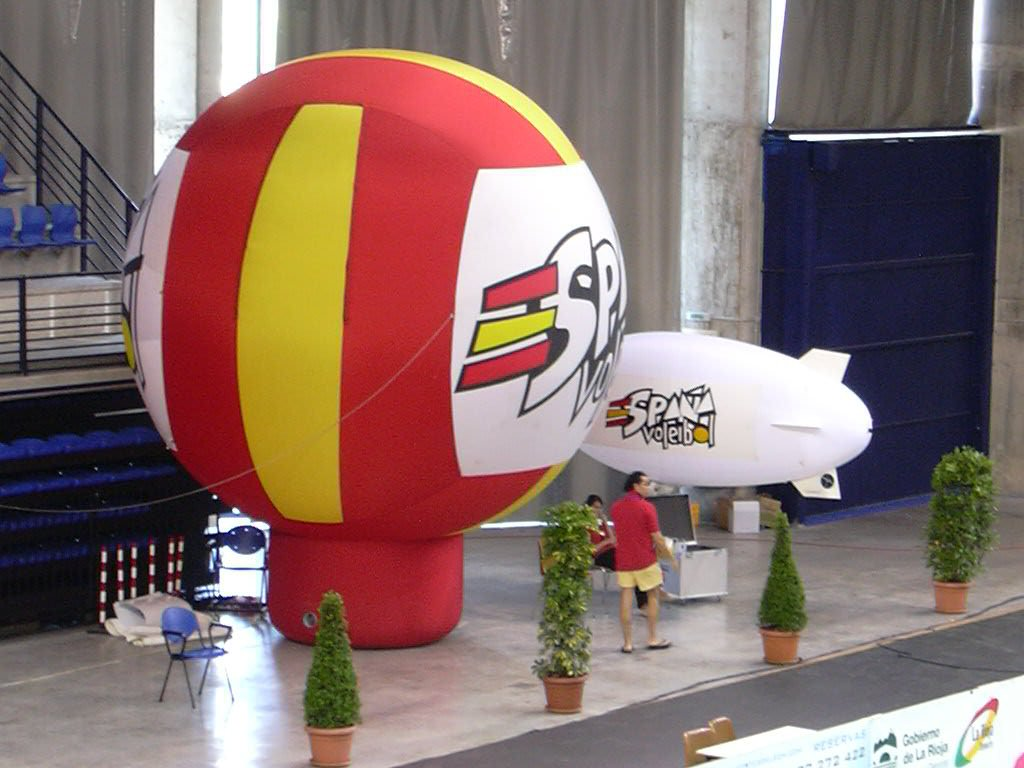
Promotional display for volleyball in Spain during a national team match

The league system for volleyball in Spain has the top teams playing in the Superliga. Each team plays all other teams twice, once at home and once away.

Spanish Volleyball League System
Level	Men's	Women's
1	Superliga	Superliga
2	Superliga 2	Superliga 2
3	Primera División	Primera División
4	Segunda División	Segunda División

The Spanish league teams compete in Europe under CEV, most notably in the Champions League for Men's and Champions League for Women's. The teams also compete in a domestic cup competition each year, called Copa del Rey de Voleibol (men's) and Copa de la Reina de Voleibol (women's). The winners of the Superliga play against the winners of the Copa in the Supercopa de España de Voleibol (Super Cup).

There are at least 220,151 volleyball players in this country and also have at least 1,033 Clubs in Spain according to various sources in 2015.

For a list of teams, see List of volleyball clubs in Spain

The Spain national volleyball team represents the whole country, although there are unofficial autonomous community volleyball teams. Spain volleyball is played only in the summer.

The Spain women's national volleyball team represents the whole country, although there are unofficial autonomous community volleyball teams.
