= Volodymyr Titarenko =

Ukrainian volleyball player

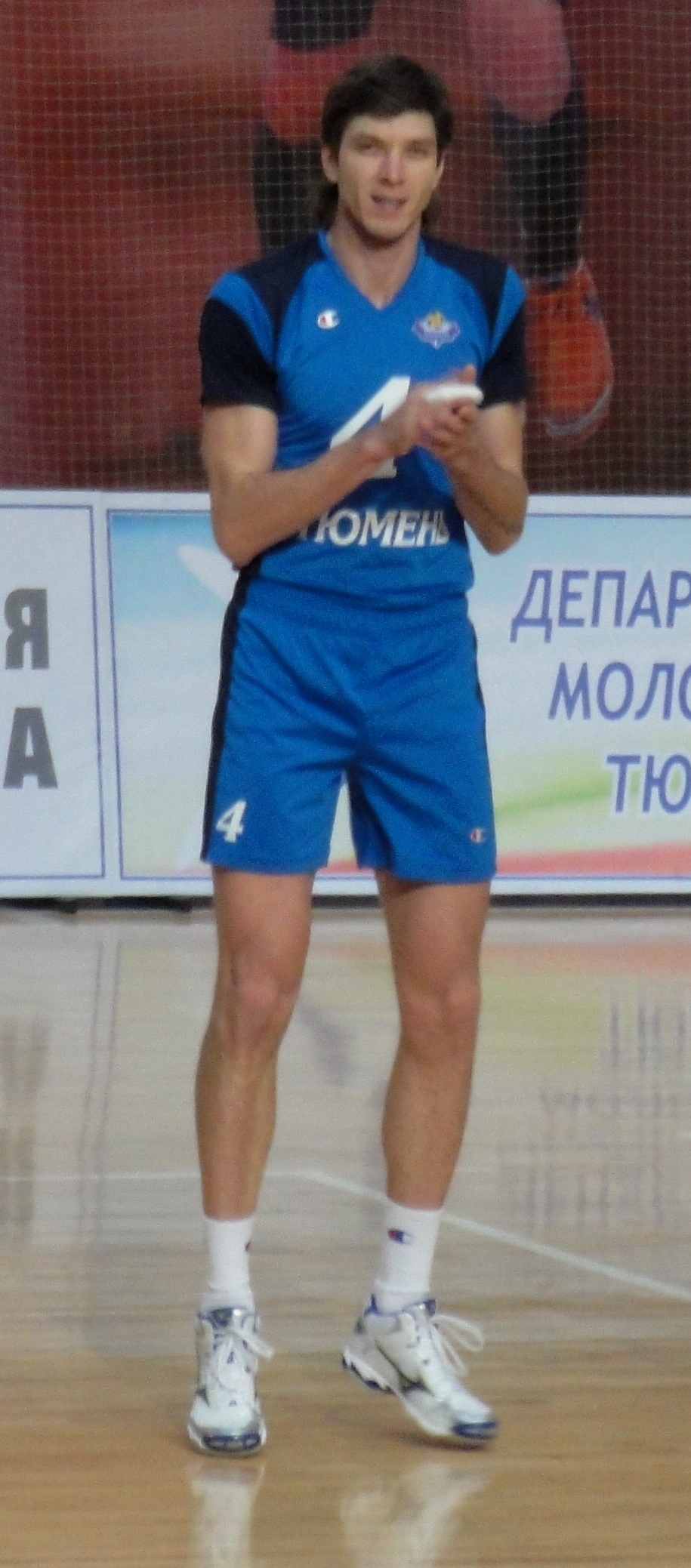

Personal information
- Full name: Volodymyr Oleksandrovych Titarenko
- Nationality: Ukraine
- Born: 4 May 1978 (age 48) Alchevsk, Soviet Union
- Height: 2.02 m (6 ft 7 1/2 in)

Volleyball information
- Position: Middle blocker

Career
- Years: Team
- 1996–1999 1999–2000 2000–2005 2005–2007 2007–2008 2008–2009 2009–2013: VC Dynamo Luhansk; Dorozhnyk-SKA Odesa; VC Lokomotyv Kharkiv; Portol Son Amar Palma; VC Lokomotyv Kharkiv; VC Dynamo Moscow; VC Tyumen

National team
- Years: Team
- 2001–2009: Ukraine

Volodymyr (Vladimir) Titarenko (born 4 May 1978) is a Ukrainian volleyball player and member of Ukraine men's national volleyball team in 2001–2009.

== Career ==
Volodymyr Titarenko started his career in the Ukrainian Volleyball Superleague in 1996. He played for VC Dynamo Luhansk for four seasons. With this team he became Vice-champion of Ukraine.

The next season (1999–2000) Titarenko played for Dorozhnyk-SKA Odesa and had Vice-champion status for the second time.

In 2000 he signed a contract with VC Lokomotyv Kharkiv. In 2004 he won the CEV Top Teams Cup.

In Spain Volodymyr Titarenko was playing in Superliga for Portol Son Amar Palma for two years. At that time he won the Superliga, Supercopa, Copa del Rey and became Vice-champion of CEV Top Teams Cup.

After playing in the Spanish league he returned to Lokomotyv Kharkiv and won Ukrainian Volleyball Cup in season 2007-08

Titarenko has been playing in Russian Volleyball Super League: VC Dynamo Moscow and VC Tyumen since 2008. In 2009 he was selected to theAll-Star Team of Russian Volleyball Super League. He continued his career as a professional volleyball player until 2013.

Volodymyr Titarenko currently lives in Texas, USA and works as a volleyball coach.

== National team ==
He debuted with the Ukraine men's national volleyball team in 2001. He was a participant of the European Volleyball Championship 2005.

With Ukraine national under-19 team Volodymyr Titarenko participated in:

- 1995 — Youth European Volleyball Championship (Qualification)
- 1996 — Youth European Volleyball Championship (5th place)

With Ukraine national under-21 team Volodymyr Titarenko participated in:

- 1997 — Junior European Volleyball Championship (Qualification)
- 1998 — Junior European Volleyball Championship (11th place)

With Ukraine national volleyball team Volodymyr Titarenko participated:

- 2001 — European Volleyball Championship (Qualification)
- 2003 — European Volleyball Championship (Qualification)
- 2004 — Olympic volleyball tournament (Qualification)
- 2005 — European Volleyball Championship (Qualification)
- 2005 — European Volleyball Championship (12th place)
- 2006 — FIVB Volleyball Men's World Championship (Qualification)
- 2009 — European Volleyball Championship (Qualification)

== Honours and achievements ==
=== Club ===
VC Dynamo Luhansk

- Ukrainian Volleyball Super League runner-up: 1995–96

Dorozhnyk-SKA Odesa

- Ukrainian Volleyball Super League runner-up: 1999–00

Lokomotyv Kharkiv

- Ukrainian Volleyball Super League: 2000–01, 2001–02, 2002–03, 2003–04, 2004–05
- Ukrainian Volleyball Cup: 2002, 2003, 2004, 2008
- European Championship: 2003–04

Portol Son Amar Palma

- Superliga de Voleibol Masculina: 2005–06, 2006–07
- Copa del Rey de Voleibol: 2005–06, 2006–07
- Supercopa de España de Voleibol: 2005–06
- European Championship runner-up: 2005–06

VC Dynamo Moscow

- Russian Volleyball Cup: 2008

=== Individual ===
- Ukrainian Volleyball Super League Best Blocker: 2003–04
- Superliga de Voleibol Masculina Best Blocker: 2005–06
- Honored badge of merit of Kharkiv Regional Council "Slobozhanskaya Glory" (Ukrainian: Почесна відзнака Харківської обласної ради «Слобожанська слава»): 2004
- Badge of honour "Railway glory" third degree (Ukrainian: Знак «Залізнична слава» ІІІ ступеня): 2004
