= 2016–17 Superliga de Voleibol Masculina =

Superliga Masculina 2016–17
- League: Superliga Masculina
- Sport: volleyball
- Duration: October 15, 2016–April 1, 2017 (regular season); April 7–29 (playoffs)
- Teams: 12

Summary
- League champions: Ca'n Ventura Palma
- Runners-up: Unicaja Almería
- Season MVP: Andrés Villena
- Promoted to Superliga 2: FC Barcelona & Ca'n Ventura Palma
- Relegated to Superliga 2: Electrocash CCPH & Fundación Cajasol Juvasa

Superliga Masculina seasons
- ← 2015–16 2017–18 →

The 2016–17 Superliga de Voleibol Masculina is the 53rd season since its establishment in 1965. The 2016–17 regular season started in October 2016 and finished on 29 April 2017.

Championship playoffs began on 7 April. Starting with semifinals, the two semifinal winners will advance to the Final to fight for the championship title to the best of three matches.

Ca'n Ventura Palma won its first ever title in his first season in Superliga after defeating defending champion Unicaja Almería 3–0 in the Championship Finals.

== Competition format ==
12 teams played in a round-robin format. Upon completion of regular season, the top four teams qualify for the playoffs, played in a best-of-5 games format, while two bottom teams are relegated to Superliga 2.

During regular season three points are awarded for a 3–0 or 3–1 win, while a 3–2 win means two points. Additionally, one point is given for any 2–3 loss.

== Teams ==
2016–17 Superliga de Voleibol Masculina teams
Canary Islands

Team	Stadium	Capacity	City/Area
CV Teruel	Los Planos	3,500	Teruel
Unicaja Almería	Moisés Ruiz	1,750	Almería
Ushuaïa Ibiza Voley	Es Viver	1,000	Ibiza Town
Río Duero–San José	Los Pajaritos	2,000	Soria
Fundación Cajasol Juvasa	Los Montecillos	1,500	Dos Hermanas, Andalusia
Melilla	Javier Imbroda Ortiz	3,800	Melilla
Vecindario ACE G.C.	Pabellón Municipal	3,000	Vecindario, Santa Lucía de Tirajana
Mediterráneo	Pablo Herrera	600	Grau de Castellón
Electrocash CCPH	Juan Serrano Macayo	1,000	Cáceres
Textil Santanderina	Matilde de la Torre	1,000	Cabezón de la Sal
Ca'n Ventura Palma	Son Moix	5,076	Palma
FC Barcelona	Parc Esportiu Llobregat	2,500	Barcelona

== Regular season standings ==
Pos	Team	Pld	W	L	Pts	SW	SL	SR	SPW	SPL	SPR	Qualification or relegation
1	Unicaja Almería	22	20	2	61	61	11	5.545	1748	1345	1.300	Qualification to playoffs
2	Ca'n Ventura Palma	22	18	4	52	59	21	2.810	1908	1605	1.189	Qualification to playoffs
3	CV Teruel	22	17	5	47	56	31	1.806	2011	1840	1.093	Qualification to playoffs
4	Ushuaïa Ibiza Voley	22	15	7	46	53	27	1.963	1861	1698	1.096	Qualification to playoffs
5	Cajasol Juvasa	22	11	11	36	43	39	1.103	1858	1823	1.019	
6	Río Duero–San José	22	11	11	32	36	40	0.900	1702	1732	0.983	
7	FC Barcelona	22	10	12	29	36	42	0.857	1685	1753	0.961	
8	Textil Santanderina	22	9	13	28	33	46	0.717	1729	1829	0.945	
9	Vecindario ACE GC	22	9	13	25	35	48	0.729	1764	1871	0.943	
10	Melilla	22	8	14	23	33	51	0.647	1812	1932	0.938	
11	Mediterráneo	22	3	19	12	22	62	0.355	1735	1992	0.871	Relegation to Superliga 2
12	Electrocash CCPH	22	1	21	5	15	64	0.234	1531	1924	0.796	Relegation to Superliga 2

== Championship playoff ==
All times are CEST, except for Canary Islands which is WEST.

=== Bracket ===
- To best of five games.

Semi-finals
1	Unicaja Almería	3	3	3
4	Ushuaïa Ibiza Voley	2	2	0
2	Ca'n Ventura Palma	3	3	3
3	CV Teruel	1	0	2

Final
1	Unicaja Almería	2	1	1
2	Ca'n Ventura Palma	3	3	3

=== Semifinals ===
==== Match 1 ====
Date	Time		Score		Set 1	Set 2	Set 3	Set 4	Set 5	Total	Report
7 Apr	20:30	Unicaja Almería	3–2	Ushuaïa Ibiza Voley	23–25	21–25	25–21	25–18	15–12	109–101	Boxscore
8 Apr	18:00	Ca'n Ventura Palma	3–1	CV Teruel	27–25	25–21	22–25	25–23		99–94	Boxscore

==== Match 2 ====
Date	Time		Score		Set 1	Set 2	Set 3	Set 4	Set 5	Total	Report
8 Apr	19:00	Unicaja Almería	3–2	Ushuaïa Ibiza Voley	25–23	24–26	25–18	22–25	15–10	111–102	Boxscore
9 Apr	18:00	Ca'n Ventura Palma	3–0	CV Teruel	25–23	25–18	25–23			75–64	Boxscore

==== Match 3 ====
Date	Time		Score		Set 1	Set 2	Set 3	Set 4	Set 5	Total	Report
15 Apr	18:00	CV Teruel	1–3	Ca'n Ventura Palma	23–25	25–17	19–25	25–20	12–15	104–102	Boxscore
15 Apr	19:00	Ushuaïa Ibiza Voley	0–3	Unicaja Almería	17–25	18–25	18–25			53–75	Boxscore

=== Final ===
==== Match 1 ====
Date	Time		Score		Set 1	Set 2	Set 3	Set 4	Set 5	Total	Report
21 Apr	20:30	Unicaja Almería	2–3	Ca'n Ventura Palma	25–23	19–25	19–25	27–25	11–15	101–113	Boxscore

==== Match 2 ====
Date	Time		Score		Set 1	Set 2	Set 3	Set 4	Set 5	Total	Report
22 Apr	19:00	Unicaja Almería	1–3	Ca'n Ventura Palma	20–25	29–27	19–25	16–25		84–102	Boxscore

==== Match 3 ====
Date	Time		Score		Set 1	Set 2	Set 3	Set 4	Set 5	Total	Report
29 Apr	18:00	Ca'n Ventura Palma	3–1	Unicaja Almería	18–25	25–19	25–23	25–14		93–81	Boxscore

- Final MVP: (Spain) Andrés Villena

2016–17 Superliga Masculina winners
(Balearic Islands)
Ca'n Ventura Palma
First title

== Top scorers ==
(Regular season and playoff statistic combined.)

Rk	Name	Team	Points	Sets	PPS
1	(Algeria) Toufik Mahdjoubi	CV Melilla	412	83	4,96
2	(Brazil) Guilherme Hage	Ca'n Ventura Palma	404	105	3,85
3	(Spain) Chema Castellano	Fundación Cajasol Juvasa	403	82	4,91
4	(Spain) Andrés Villena	Ca'n Ventura Palma	402	93	4,32
5	(Brazil) Leandro Martins	Vecindario ACE GC	395	80	4,94
6	(France) Julien Winkelmuller	Río Duero–San José	368	81	4,54
7	(Spain) Manuel Salvador	Río Duero–San José	382	75	5,09
8	(Spain) Raúl Muñoz	Ushuaïa Ibiza Voley	369	93	3,97
9	(Brazil) Alemão	Unicaja Almería	350	93	3,76
10	(Spain) Miguel Mateo	Mediterráneo	331	83	3,99
