= Miguel Rivera (volleyball) =

Spanish volleyball coach

Miguel Rivera Rodríguez (born 22 June 1984) is a Spanish volleyball coach. He currently holds the position of Men's National Coach, since January 2022, and after having been assistant coach of the same National Team since 2014. He has also coached Club Volleyball Teruel, with whom he won a total of nine national titles (5 Spanish Supercups, 2 Superligas and 2 Copas del Rey).Rivera was born in Madrid.

== Career ==
Rivera began his coaching career at Club Volleyball Alcobendas, where he was assistant to César Hernández in the 2006-2007 and 2007–2008 seasons, when the team played in the First National and FEV League categories, achieving promotion in both seasons. However, with the economic crisis, the Club changed its dynamics and the coaches did not continue.

Rivera later joined the Permanent Concentration of the Royal Spanish Volleyball Federation, as assistant to Ricardo Maldonado, where he was between the 2009-2010 and 2013–2014 seasons.

The summer of 2014, in addition to working with the National Team, served him to sign for Club Volleyball Teruel, under the guidance of Carlos "Charly" Carreño, who was his assistant at the Teruel club in the 2014-2015 and 2015–2016 seasons. In March 2016, the club's board decided to dispense with Carreño and give the team's controls to Miguel Rivera, who led the team to the Superliga final that season.

The successes achieved with Club Volleyball Teruel helped him to be appointed National Men's Coach in January 2022. At the head of the National Team he won the silver medal at the Mediterranean Games 2022, after losing in the final against Croatia 3–1. He also qualified for EuroVolley 2023, after 6 wins in as many games in the Qualifying Phase.

After six successful seasons, in April 2022 Club Volleyball Teruel announced that Miguel Rivera would not be the coach for the following season.

During the 2022–23 season he did not coach any clubs, dedicating himself exclusively to his role as Men's National Coach. However, in May 2023, Club Volleyball Haris announced that Rivera would be the coach of the La Laguna team for the following two seasons.

== Clubs ==
Club	País	Periodo
Club Voleibol Alcobendas	(Spain)	2006-09
Concentración Permanente RFEVB	(Spain)	2009-14
Club Voleibol Teruel	(Spain)	2014-22
Club Voleibol Haris	(Spain)	2023-

== National team ==
País	Selección	Periodo	Cargo
Spain U17	(Spain)	2008-14	Assistant coach
Spain U19	(Spain)	2009-14	Assistant coach
Spain	(Spain)	2014-21	Assistant coach
Spain	(Spain)	2022-2023	Coach
