= Ángel Trinidad =

Spanish volleyball player (born 1993)

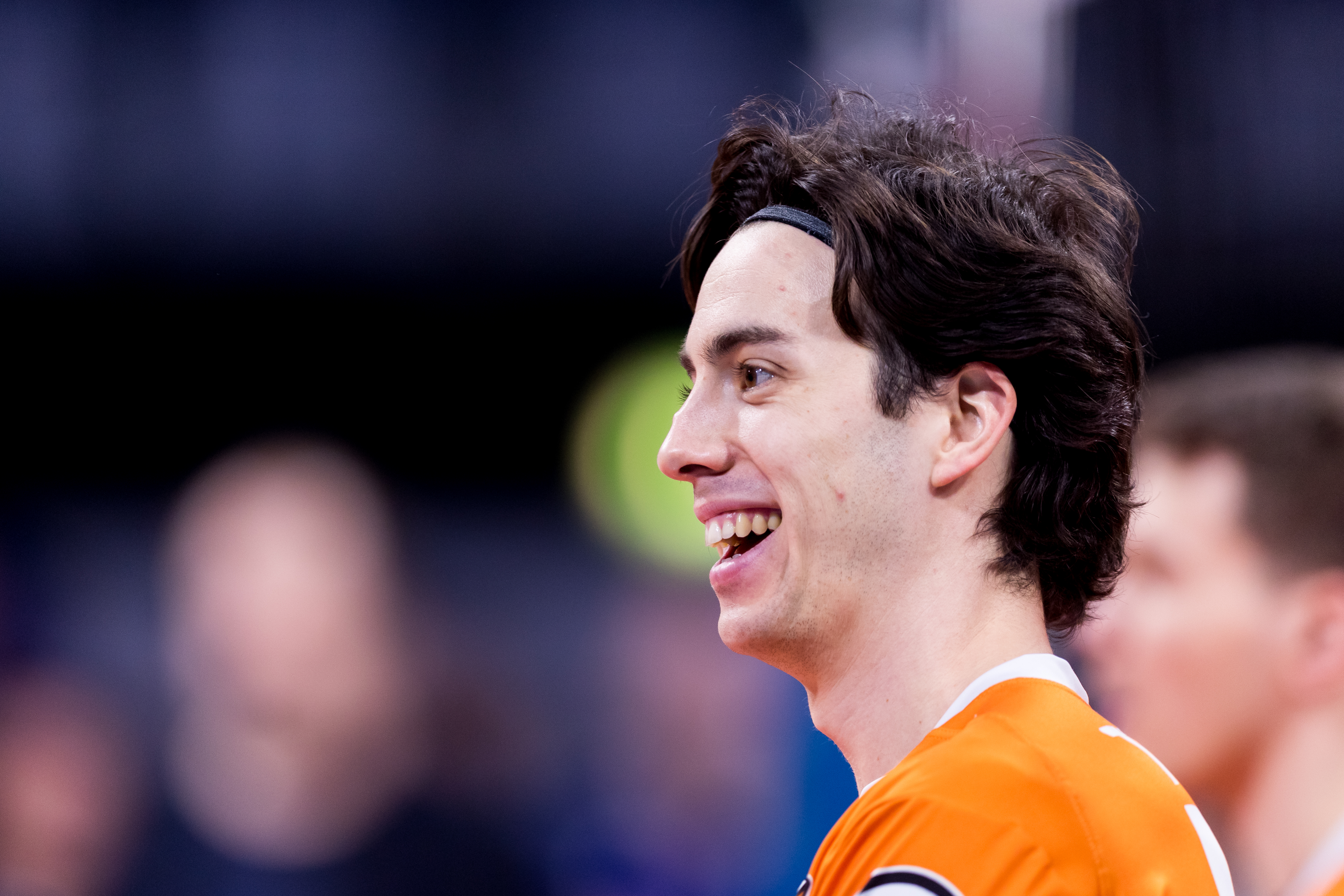
- Trinidad in 2023

Personal information
- Full name: Ángel Trinidad de Haro
- Born: 27 March 1993 (age 33) Estepona, Spain
- Height: 1.95 m (6 ft 5 in)
- Weight: 78 kg (172 lb)
- Spike: 340 cm (134 in)
- Block: 330 cm (130 in)

Volleyball information
- Position: Setter
- Current club: Ślepsk Suwałki
- Number: 2

Career
- Years: Team
- 2012–2013 2013–2014 2014–2015 2015–2018 2018–2020 2020–2022 2022–2023 2023–2024 2024–2025 2025–2026 2026–: Unicaja Almería; Volley Callipo; Volleyball Bisons Bühl; Knack Roeselare; Tours VB; Projekt Warsaw; Berlin Recycling Volleys; Prisma Volley; Guaguas Las Palmas; Arago de Sète; Ślepsk Suwałki

National team
- Years: Team
- 2015–: Spain
Honours
Men's volleyball
Representing Spain
Mediterranean Games
| Silver medal – second place | 2018 Tarragona |

Ángel Trinidad de Haro (born 27 March 1993) is a Spanish professional volleyball player who plays as a setter for Ślepsk Suwałki and the Spain national team.

== Honours ==
=== Club ===
- Domestic
  - 2012–13 Spanish Championship, with Unicaja Almería
  - 2015–16 Belgian Cup, with Knack Roeselare
  - 2015–16 Belgian Championship, with Knack Roeselare
  - 2016–17 Belgian Cup, with Knack Roeselare
  - 2016–17 Belgian Championship, with Knack Roeselare
  - 2017–18 Belgian Cup, with Knack Roeselare
  - 2018–19 French Cup, with Tours VB
  - 2018–19 French Championship, with Tours VB
  - 2022–23 German SuperCup, with Berlin Recycling Volleys
  - 2022–23 German Cup, with Berlin Recycling Volleys
  - 2022–23 German Championship, with Berlin Recycling Volleys
  - 2024–25 Spanish SuperCup, with Guaguas Las Palmas
  - 2024–25 Spanish Cup, with Guaguas Las Palmas
  - 2024–25 Spanish Championship, with Guaguas Las Palmas

=== Youth national team ===
- 2011 FIVB U19 World Championship
- 2012 CEV U20 European Championship
