= 2015–16 Superliga de Voleibol Masculina =

Superliga Masculina 2015–16
- League: Superliga Masculina
- Sport: volleyball
- Duration: October 3, 2015–April 2, 2016 (regular season); April 9–May 5 (playoffs)
- Teams: 12

Summary
- League champions: Unicaja Almería
- Runners-up: CAI Teruel
- Season MVP: Borja Ruiz
- Promoted to Superliga 2: CV Mediterraneo & CV Melilla
- Relegated to Superliga 2: VP Madrid & UBE L'Illa-Grau

Superliga Masculina seasons
- ← 2014–15 2016–17 →

Superliga de Voleibol Masculina 2015–16 was the 52nd (LII) season since its establishment in 1965. The 2015–16 regular season started on October 3, 2015, and finished on April 2, 2016.

Championship playoffs began on 9 April. Starting with semifinals, the two semifinal winners will advance to the Final to fight for the championship title to the best of three matches.

Defending champions were Unicaja Almería, by winning 2014–15 championship final 3–1 to CAI Teruel.

The championship was decided in a thrilling five-games series, winning Unicaja Almería the fifth and final match, and becoming champions for the eleventh time in its history.

== Competition format ==
12 teams played in a round-robin format. Upon completion of regular season, the top four teams play Championship's playoffs, while two bottom teams are relegated to Superliga 2.

During regular season, points are awarded as following:

- a win by 3–0 or 3–1 means 3 points to winner team,
- a 3–2 win, 2 points for winner team & 1 for loser team.

Championship playoffs is played to best of 3 games.

== 2015–16 season teams ==
2015–16 Superliga de Voleibol Masculina teams
Canary Islands

Team	Stadium	Capacity	City/Area
Unicaja Almería	Moisés Ruiz	1,750	Almería
CAI Teruel	Los Planos	3,500	Teruel
Río Duero–San José	Los Pajaritos	2,000	Soria
Ushuaïa Ibiza Voley	Es Viver	1,000	Ibiza Town
Fundación Cajasol Juvasa	Los Montecillos	1,500	Dos Hermanas, Andalusia
Vecindario ACE G.C.	Pabellón Municipal	3,000	Vecindario, Santa Lucía de Tirajana
Electrocash CCPH	Juan Serrano Macayo	1,000	Cáceres
Textil Santanderina-La Gallofa	Matilde de la Torre	1,000	Cabezón de la Sal
UBE L'Illa-Grau	Ciutat Esportiva	700	Castellón de la Plana
VP Madrid	CDM Entrevías	500	Madrid
Mediterráneo	Pablo Herrera	600	Grau de Castellón
Melilla	Javier Imbroda Ortiz	3,800	Melilla

== Regular season standings ==
Pos	Team	Pld	W	L	Pts	SW	SL	SR	SPW	SPL	SPR	Qualification or relegation
1	Unicaja Almería	23	21	2	63	65	8	8.125	1787	1324	1.350	Qualification to playoffs
2	CAI Teruel	22	20	2	59	63	19	3.316	1978	1594	1.241	Qualification to playoffs
3	Ushuaïa Ibiza Voley	22	15	7	48	56	30	1.867	1997	1806	1.106	Qualification to playoffs
4	Río Duero–San José	22	14	8	42	48	32	1.500	1830	1768	1.035	Qualification to playoffs
5	Fundación Cajasol Juvasa	22	9	13	32	42	47	0.894	1990	2022	0.984	
6	Melilla	22	12	10	31	44	48	0.917	2024	2042	0.991	
7	Vecindario ACE GC	22	9	13	26	36	46	0.783	1761	1861	0.946	
8	Mediterráneo	22	8	14	26	37	51	0.725	1880	1979	0.950	
9	Electrocash CCPH	22	7	15	21	29	52	0.558	1729	1864	0.928	
10	Textil Santanderina-La Gallofa	22	7	15	19	30	53	0.566	1729	1900	0.910	
11	VP Madrid	22	7	15	18	27	54	0.500	1614	1892	0.853	Relegation to Superliga 2
12	UBE L'Illa-Grau	22	3	19	11	24	61	0.393	1743	2010	0.867	Relegation to Superliga 2

== Championship playoff ==
All times are CEST, except for Canary Islands which is WEST.

=== Bracket ===
- To best of five games.

Semi-finals
1	Unicaja Almería	3	3	3
4	Río Duero–San José	0	0	1
2	CAI Teruel	3	3	3
3	Ushuaïa Ibiza Voley	1	1	1

Final
1	Unicaja Almería	2	3	0	3	3
2	CAI Teruel	3	0	3	2	0

=== Semifinals ===
==== Match 1 ====
Date	Time		Score		Set 1	Set 2	Set 3	Set 4	Set 5	Total	Report
9 Apr	18:00	CAI Teruel	3–1	Ushuaïa Ibiza Voley	25–16	25–17	17–25	25–20		92–78	Box Score
9 Apr	20:30	Unicaja Almería	3–0	Río Duero–San José	25–23	25–7	25–19			75–49	Box Score

==== Match 2 ====
Date	Time		Score		Set 1	Set 2	Set 3	Set 4	Set 5	Total	Report
10 Apr	17:00	CAI Teruel	3–1	Ushuaïa Ibiza Voley	18–25	25–19	25–13	25–17		93–74	Box Score
10 Apr	19:00	Unicaja Almería	3–0	Río Duero–San José	25–22	25–19	25–15			75–56	Box Score

==== Match 3 ====
Date	Time		Score		Set 1	Set 2	Set 3	Set 4	Set 5	Total	Report
16 Apr	19:00	Ushuaïa Ibiza Voley	1–3	CAI Teruel	25–22	11–25	21–25	26–28		83–100	Box Score
16 Apr	20:00	Río Duero–San José	1–3	Unicaja Almería	17–25	34–32	23–25	22–25		96–107	Box Score

=== Final ===
==== Match 1 ====
Date	Time		Score		Set 1	Set 2	Set 3	Set 4	Set 5	Total	Report
23 Apr	19:30	Unicaja Almería	2–3	CAI Teruel	20–25	28–26	25–15	25–27	8–15	106–108	Boxscore

==== Match 2 ====
Date	Time		Score		Set 1	Set 2	Set 3	Set 4	Set 5	Total	Report
24 Apr	19:30	Unicaja Almería	3–0	CAI Teruel	25–23	25–14	25–13			75–50	Boxscore

==== Match 3 ====
Date	Time		Score		Set 1	Set 2	Set 3	Set 4	Set 5	Total	Report
30 Apr	18:00	CAI Teruel	3–0	Unicaja Almería	28–26	28–26	25–22			81–74	Boxscore

==== Match 4 ====
Date	Time		Score		Set 1	Set 2	Set 3	Set 4	Set 5	Total	Report
1 May	19:00	CAI Teruel	2–3	Unicaja Almería	25–17	25–15	24–26	22–25	13–15	109–98	Boxscore

==== Match 5 ====
Date	Time		Score		Set 1	Set 2	Set 3	Set 4	Set 5	Total	Report
5 May	20:30	Unicaja Almería	3–0	CAI Teruel	25–22	25–22	28–26			78–70	Boxscore

- Final MVP: (Spain) Borja Ruiz

2015–16 Superliga Masculina winners
(Andalusia)
Unicaja Almería
Eleventh title

== Top scorers ==
(Regular season and playoff statistic combined.)

Rk	Name	Team	Points	Sets	PPS
1	(Brazil) Marcilio Braga	Unicaja Almería	496	99	5,01
2	(Spain) Raúl Muñoz	Ushuaïa Ibiza Voley	448	104	4,31
3	(Spain) Fran Ruiz	CAI Teruel	419	115	3,64
4	(Spain) Chema Castellano	Fundación Cajasol Juvasa	409	85	4,81
5	(Brazil) Guilherme Hage	Unicaja Almería	394	102	3,86
6	(Spain) Miguel Mateo	Textil Santanderina-La Gallofa	368	81	4,54
7	(Spain) Manuel Salvador	Río Duero–San José	366	91	4,02
8	(Spain) Juan Carlos Barcala	CAI Teruel	364	95	3,83
9	(Spain) Carlos Jiménez	Río Duero–San José	362	85	4,26
10	(Spain) Juan Díaz Romeral	Electrocash CCPH	362	87	4,16
