= List of volleyball clubs in Spain =

List of volleyball clubs in Spain sorted by division:

== Superliga Masculina 2007/08 season ==
- Arona Playa Las Américas
- CAI Voleibol Teruel
- CV Almoradí
- CV Elche
- Ciudad de Medio Ambiente Soria
- Drac Palma Pórtol
- Fábregas Sport Multicaja
- Jusan Canarias
- Tarragona SPSP
- 7 Islas Vecindario
- Unicaja Arukasur
- Universidad de Granada

== Superliga Femenina 2007/08 season ==
- CV Albacete
- Ciudad Las Palmas Cantur
- Voleibol Murcia 2005
- Voleibol Benidorm
- IBSA Club Voleibol
- Ícaro Palma
- Jamper Aguere
- Spar Tenerife Marichal
- Universidad de Burgos
- Valeriano Alles Menorca
- VB Bargas Atalia Sarrión PSG
- Voley Sanse

== See also ==
- Volleyball in Spain
