= 2012–13 Superliga de Voleibol Masculina =

Superliga Masculina 2012–13
- League: Superliga Masculina
- Sport: volleyball
- Duration: October 13, 2012–March 2, 2013 (regular season); March 8–April 6 (playoffs)
- Teams: 10

Summary
- Season champions: Unicaja Almería
- Runners-up: CAI Teruel
- Season MVP: Andrés Villena, Unicaja Almería
- Promoted to Superliga 2: Ushuaïa Ibiza Voley & CV Andorra
- Relegated to Superliga 2: CV Zaragoza

Superliga Masculina seasons
- ← 2011–12 2013–14 →

Superliga de Voleibol Masculina 2012–13 is the 49th (XLIX) season since its establishment. The 2012–13 regular season started on October 13, 2012, and finished on March 2, 2013.

Championship playoffs began March 8, with the two semifinals winners vying for the championship title in the Final.

Defending champion CAI Teruel was defeated in the Final by Unicaja Almería, thus winning its ninth title, its first title since the last time in 2004-05 season.

== Competition format ==
10 teams played in a two-rounds format. Upon completion of regular season, the top four teams play Championship's playoffs, while the bottom team is relegated to Superliga 2.

During regular season, a win by 3–0 or 3–1 means 3 points to winner team, while a 3–2 win, 2 points for winner team & 1 for loser team.

Championship playoffs is played to best of 3 games.

== 2012–13 season teams ==
2012–13 Superliga de Voleibol Masculina teams
Canary Islands

Team	Stadium	Capacity	City/Area
CAI Teruel	Los Planos	3,500	Teruel
CMA Soria	Los Pajaritos	2,000	Soria
Unicaja Almería	Moisés Ruiz	1,750	Almería
Cajasol Juvasa	Los Montecillos	1,500	Dos Hermanas, Andalusia
UBE L'Illa-Grau	Ciutat Esportiva	700	Castellón de la Plana
Zaragoza	Siglo XXI	2,780	Zaragoza
Vigo	Pavillón de Coia	1,300	Vigo
Vecindario ACE G.C.	Pabellón Municipal	3,000	Vecindario, Santa Lucía de Tirajana
Andorra	Poliesportiu d'Andorra	1,784	Andorra la Vella
Ushuaïa Ibiza Voley	Es Viver	1,000	Ibiza Town

== 2012–13 regular season standings ==
#	Team	P	Wx3	Wx2	Lx1	Lx0	Sets+	Sets–	Points+	Points–	Pts	Qualification or relegation
1	CAI Teruel	18	14	3	0	1	51	10	1466	1134	48	Final playoffs
2	Unicaja Almería	18	14	1	2	1	50	12	1497	1142	46	Final playoffs
3	CMA Soria	18	12	1	1	4	42	18	1399	1201	39	Final playoffs
4	Cajasol Juvasa	18	13	0	0	5	41	21	1466	1299	39	Final playoffs
5	Ushuaïa Ibiza Voley	18	12	0	1	5	39	22	1412	1274	37	
6	L'Illa-Grau	18	5	2	0	11	25	38	1340	1418	19	
7	Vecindario ACE Gran Canaria	18	5	1	1	11	23	38	1250	1384	18	
8	Andorra	18	4	1	1	12	19	43	1228	1435	15	
9	Vigo	18	2	0	3	13	12	48	1091	1428	9	
10	Zaragoza	18	0	0	0	18	2	54	960	1394	0	Relegated

== Championship playoffs ==
=== Bracket ===
- To best of three games.

Semi-finals
1	CAI Teruel	3	3	3
4	Cajasol Juvasa	0	0	1
3	CMA Soria	1	0	1
2	Unicaja Almería	3	3	3

Final
1	CAI Teruel	3	1	0	1
2	Unicaja Almería	0	3	3	3

2012–13 Superliga Masculina winners
(Andalusia)
Unicaja Almería
Ninth title

=== Semifinals ===
==== Match 1 ====
Date	Time		Score		Set 1	Set 2	Set 3	Set 4	Set 5	Total	Report
8 Mar	20:30	Unicaja Almería	3–1	CMA Soria	25–27	25–16	25–21	25–22		100–86	Report
9 Mar	18:00	CAI Teruel	3–0	Cajasol Juvasa	25–16	25–19	25–21			75–56	Report

==== Match 2 ====
Date	Time		Score		Set 1	Set 2	Set 3	Set 4	Set 5	Total	Report
9 Mar	18:00	Unicaja Almería	3–0	CMA Soria	25–16	25–20	25–12			75–48	Report
10 Mar	18:00	CAI Teruel	3–0	Cajasol Juvasa	25–20	26–24	25–21			76–65	Report

==== Match 3 ====
Date	Time		Score		Set 1	Set 2	Set 3	Set 4	Set 5	Total	Report
16 Mar	18:00	Cajasol Juvasa	1–3	CAI Teruel	20–25	21–25	25–23	19–25		85–98	Report
16 Mar	18:00	CMA Soria	1–3	Unicaja Almería	26–24	13–25	16–25	34–36		89–110	Report

=== Final ===
==== Match 1 ====
Date	Time		Score		Set 1	Set 2	Set 3	Set 4	Set 5	Total	Report
30 Mar	18:00	CAI Teruel	3–0	Unicaja Almería	25–19	25–19	25–21			75–59	Report

==== Match 2 ====
Date	Time		Score		Set 1	Set 2	Set 3	Set 4	Set 5	Total	Report
31 Mar	19:00	CAI Teruel	1–3	Unicaja Almería	25–22	20–25	15–25	15–25		75–97	Report

==== Match 3 ====
Date	Time		Score		Set 1	Set 2	Set 3	Set 4	Set 5	Total	Report
5 Apr	20:30	Unicaja Almería	3–0	CAI Teruel	25–21	25–19	25–22			75–62	Report

==== Match 4 ====
Date	Time		Score		Set 1	Set 2	Set 3	Set 4	Set 5	Total	Report
6 Apr	19:00	Unicaja Almería	3–1	CAI Teruel	25–16	28–30	25–18	25–22		103–86	Report

- Final MVP: Andrés Villena

== Top scorers ==
(This statistics includes regular season and playoff matches.)

Rk	Name	Team	Points	Sets	PPS
1	(Spain) Juan Carlos Barcala	CAI Teruel	413	80	5,163
2	(Spain) Andrés Villena	Unicaja Almería	406	84	4,833
3	(Spain) Raúl Muñoz	Cajasol Juvasa	325	69	4,710
4	(Argentina) Pavel Kukartsev	UBE L'Illa-Grau	257	58	4,431
5	(Spain) Semidán Deniz	Vecindario ACE G.C.	243	57	4,263
