= 2011–12 Superliga de Voleibol Masculina =

Superliga Masculina 2011–12
- League: Superliga Masculina
- Sport: volleyball
- Duration: October, 2011–March, 2012 (regular season); March 17, 2012–April 14, 2012 (playoffs)
- Teams: 9

Summary
- Season champions: Caja 3 Teruel
- Runners-up: Unicaja Almería
- Season MVP: Rodman Valera, Caja3 Teruel
- Promoted to Superliga 2: Voley Guada & UBE Lilla Grau
- Relegated to Superliga 2: Voley Guada

Superliga Masculina seasons
- ← 2010–11 2012–13 →

Superliga de Voleibol Masculina 2011–12 was the 48th (XLVIII) season since its establishment. The 2011–12 season started in October 2011, and finished on April 14, 2012.

Defending champions, Caja3 Teruel were able to defend its previous season title and won its second title in a row.

== Competition format ==
9 teams played in a two-round format. Upon completion of regular season, the top four teams play Championship's playoffs, while the bottom team is relegated to Superliga 2.

During regular season, a win by 3–0 or 3–1 means 3 points to winner team, while a 3–2 win, 2 points for winner team & 1 for loser team.

Championship playoffs is played to best of 3 games.

== 2011–12 season teams ==
2011-12 Superliga de Voleibol Masculina teams
Canary Islands

Team	Stadium	Capacity	City/Area
Caja3 Teruel	Los Planos	2,000	Teruel
CMA Soria	Los Pajaritos	2,000	Soria
Unicaja Almería	Moisés Ruiz	1,750	Almería
Cajasol Juvasa	Los Montecillos	1,500	Dos Hermanas, Andalusia
L'Illa-Grau	Ciutat Esportiva	700	Castellón de la Plana
Bantierra Fábregas Sport	Siglo XXI	2,780	Zaragoza
Vigo Voleibol	Pavillón de Coia	1,300	Vigo
Voley Guada	Multiusos de Guadalajara	5,894	Guadalajara
7 Islas Vecindario	Pabellón Municipal	5,500	Vecindario, Santa Lucía de Tirajana

== 2011–12 season standings ==
#	Team	P	Wx3	Wx2	Lx1	Lx0	Sets+	Sets–	Points+	Points–	Pts	Qualification or relegation
1	Caja3 Teruel	16	15	0	1	0	47	5	1279	977	46	Final playoffs
2	CMA Soria	16	12	2	0	2	43	13	1328	1149	40	Final playoffs
3	Unicaja Almería	16	11	0	1	4	37	18	1313	1194	34	Final playoffs
4	Cajasol Juvasa	16	9	0	2	5	32	24	1289	1258	29	Final playoffs
5	L'Illa-Grau	16	6	1	1	8	27	32	1319	1353	21	
6	Bantierra Fábregas Sport	16	5	2	0	9	25	32	1236	1302	19	
7	Vigo	16	4	2	1	9	22	35	1256	1293	17	
8	Voley Guada	16	0	1	4	11	11	47	1118	1373	6	Relegated
9	7 Islas Vecindario	16	0	2	0	14	8	46	1067	1306	4	

== Championship playoffs ==
=== Bracket ===
- To best of three games.

Semi-finals
1	Caja3 Teruel	3	3	3
4	Cajasol Juvasa	0	0	0
2	CMA Soria	1	3	3	2	1
3	Unicaja Almería	3	0	2	3	3

Final
1	Caja3 Teruel	3	3	3
3	Unicaja Almería	0	0	1

2011–12 Superliga Masculina winners
(Aragon)
Caja3 Teruel
Fourth title

=== Semifinals ===
==== Match 1 ====
Date	Time		Score		Set 1	Set 2	Set 3	Set 4	Set 5	Total	Report
17 Mar	18:00	Caja3 Teruel	3–0	Cajasol Juvasa	25–13	25–21	25–14			75–48	Report
17 Mar	20:00	CMA Soria	1–3	Unicaja Almería	22–25	25–16	18–25	27–29		92–95	Report

==== Match 2 ====
Date	Time		Score		Set 1	Set 2	Set 3	Set 4	Set 5	Total	Report
18 Mar	18:00	Caja3 Teruel	3–0	Cajasol Juvasa	25–19	25–19	25–19			75–57	Report
18 Mar	18:00	CMA Soria	3–0	Unicaja Almería	25–19	25–22	25–18			75–59	Report

==== Match 3 ====
Date	Time		Score		Set 1	Set 2	Set 3	Set 4	Set 5	Total	Report
23 Mar	20:30	Unicaja Almería	2–3	CMA Soria	23–25	15–25	25–20	27–25	13–15	103–110	Report
24 Mar	18:00	Cajasol Juvasa	0–3	Caja3 Teruel	22–25	18–25	23–25			63–75	Report

==== Match 4 ====
Date	Time		Score		Set 1	Set 2	Set 3	Set 4	Set 5	Total	Report
24 Mar	19:00	Unicaja Almería	3–2	CMA Soria	21–25	25–21	16–25	25–16	15–10	102–97	Report

==== Match 5 ====
Date	Time		Score		Set 1	Set 2	Set 3	Set 4	Set 5	Total	Report
31 Mar	18:00	CMA Soria	1–3	Unicaja Almería	22–25	25–20	23–25	22–25		92–95	Report

=== Final ===
==== Match 1 ====
Date	Time		Score		Set 1	Set 2	Set 3	Set 4	Set 5	Total	Report
7 Apr	18:00	Caja3 Teruel	3–0	Unicaja Almería	25–22	26–24	25–21			76–67	Report

==== Match 2 ====
Date	Time		Score		Set 1	Set 2	Set 3	Set 4	Set 5	Total	Report
8 Apr	18:00	Caja3 Teruel	3–0	Unicaja Almería	30–28	25–20	25–19			80–67	Report

==== Match 3 ====
Date	Time		Score		Set 1	Set 2	Set 3	Set 4	Set 5	Total	Report
14 Apr	18:00	Unicaja Almería	1–3	Caja3 Teruel	27–29	21–25	25–22	19–25		92–101	Report

== Top scorers ==
(This statistics includes regular season and playoff matches.)

Rk	Name	Team	Points	Sets	PPS
1	(Brazil) Rodrigo Pereira	Cajasol Juvasa	338	65	5,200
2	(Spain) Semidán Deniz	7 Islas Vecindario	244	54	4,519
3	(Spain) Daniel Rocamora	CMA Soria	323	72	4,486
4	(Spain) Ibán Pérez	Unicaja Almería	360	82	4,390
5	(United States) Matthew Webber	Caja3 Teruel	270	62	4,355
