= 2010–11 CEV Cup =

Volleyball season

- League: CEV Cup
- Sport: Volleyball
- Duration: 16 November 2010 – 12 March 2011

Finals
- Champions: (Italy) Sisley Treviso
- Runners-up: (Poland) ZAKSA Kędzierzyn-Koźle

CEV Cup seasons
- ← 2009–10 2011–12 →

The 2010–11 CEV Cup was the 39th edition of the European CEV Cup volleyball club tournament.

== Participating teams ==
Country	Number of teams	Teams
Austria	1	Aon hotVolleys Vienna
Belgium	2	VC Euphony Asse-Lennik, Topvolley Antwerpen
Bosnia and Herzegovina	1	OK Kakanj
Bulgaria	0 +1	CSKA Sofia
Croatia	1	HAOK Mladost Zagreb
Cyprus	1	Anorthosis Famagusta
Czech Republic	1	VK Ostrava
Estonia	1	VK Selver Tallinn
Finland	2	Sun Volley Oulu, Raision Loimu
France	2	Arago de Sète, Stade Poitevin Poitiers
Germany	2 +1	Berlin Recycling Volleys, Evivo Düren, VfB Friedrichshafen
Greece	2	GC Lamia, Aris Thessaloniki
Hungary	2	Volleyball Kaposvár, Kecskeméti SE
Israel	1	Maccabi Tel Aviv
Italy	1 +1	Casa Modena, Sisley Treviso
Netherlands	1	AB Groningen/Lycurgus
Poland	2	Asseco Resovia, ZAKSA Kędzierzyn-Koźle
Romania	2	Tomis Constanța, Dinamo București
Spain	1 +1	Unicaja Almería, CAI Teruel
Serbia	1	OK Vojvodina
Slovenia	1	OK Salonit Anhovo Kanal
Switzerland	2	Lausanne UC, TV Amriswil Volleyball
Turkey	1	Ziraat Bankası Ankara
Ukraine	1	Lokomotyv Kharkiv

== Main phase ==
=== 16th Finals ===
The 16 winning teams from the 1/16 Finals will compete in the 1/8 Finals playing Home & Away matches. The losers of the 1/16 Final matches will qualify for the 3rd round in Challenge Cup.

Team 1	Agg.	Team 2	1st leg	2nd leg	Golden Set
Casa Modena (Italy)	6–0	(Croatia) HAOK Mladost Zagreb	3–0	3–0	
Anorthosis Famagusta (Cyprus)	5–5	(Switzerland) TV Amriswil Volleyball	3–2	2–3	8–15
Aon hotVolleys Vienna (Austria)	6–1	(Hungary) Kecskeméti SE	3–1	3–0	
Maccabi Tel Aviv (Israel)	1–6	(Turkey) Ziraat Bankası Ankara	1–3	0–3	
VC Euphony Asse-Lennik (Belgium)	6–0	(Switzerland) Lausanne UC	3–0	3–0	
Stade Poitevin Poitiers (France)	5–4	(Serbia) OK Vojvodina	2–3	3–1	15–11
VK Ostrava (Czech Republic)	0–6	(Ukraine) Lokomotyv Kharkiv	0–3	0–3	
OK Kakanj (Bosnia and Herzegovina)	1–6	(France) Arago de Sète	1–3	0–3	
Asseco Resovia (Poland)	6–1	(Hungary) Volleyball Kaposvár	3–0	3–1	
Berlin Recycling Volleys (Germany)	6–0	(Romania) Tomis Constanța	3–0	3–0	
OK Salonit Anhovo Kanal (Slovenia)	3–5	(Romania) Dinamo București	3–2	0–3	12–15
Topvolley Antwerpen (Belgium)	5–5	(Germany) Evivo Düren	3–2	2–3	12–15
Unicaja Almería (Spain)	4–4	(Greece) GC Lamia	3–1	1–3	15–12
Raision Loimu (Finland)	3–6	(Netherlands) AB Groningen/Lycurgus	1–3	2–3	
Sun Volley Oulu (Finland)	1–6	(Poland) ZAKSA Kędzierzyn-Koźle	0–3	1–3	
VK Selver Tallinn (Estonia)	5–3	(Greece) Aris Thessaloniki	3–0	2–3	15–17

==== First leg ====
Date	Time		Score		Set 1	Set 2	Set 3	Set 4	Set 5	Total	Report
17 Nov	20:30	Casa Modena (Italy)	3–0	(Croatia) HAOK Mladost Zagreb	25–15	25–11	25–15			75–41	Report
16 Nov	20:00	Anorthosis Famagusta (Cyprus)	3–2	(Switzerland) TV Amriswil Volleyball	25–23	26–28	25–22	20–25	15–10	111–108	Report
18 Nov	20:15	Aon hotVolleys Vienna (Austria)	3–1	(Hungary) Kecskeméti SE	25–19	15–25	25–16	25–21		90–81	Report
16 Nov	19:30	Maccabi Tel Aviv (Israel)	1–3	(Turkey) Ziraat Bankası Ankara	25–19	22–25	18–25	17–25		82–94	Report
17 Nov	20:30	VC Euphony Asse-Lennik (Belgium)	3–0	(Switzerland) Lausanne UC	25–21	28–26	25–14			78–61	Report
16 Nov	20:00	Stade Poitevin Poitiers (France)	2–3	(Serbia) OK Vojvodina	23–25	19–25	25–21	25–18	13–15	105–104	Report
16 Nov	17:00	VK Ostrava (Czech Republic)	0–3	(Ukraine) Lokomotyv Kharkiv	19–25	17–25	14–25			50–75	Report
18 Nov	18:00	OK Kakanj (Bosnia and Herzegovina)	1–3	(France) Arago de Sète	16–25	25–23	22–25	20–25		83–98	Report
17 Nov	18:00	Asseco Resovia (Poland)	3–0	(Hungary) Volleyball Kaposvár	25–13	25–19	25–19			75–51	Report
17 Nov	19:30	Berlin Recycling Volleys (Germany)	3–0	(Romania) Tomis Constanța	25–21	25–13	25–16			75–50	Report
17 Nov	19:00	OK Salonit Anhovo Kanal (Slovenia)	3–2	(Romania) Dinamo București	22–25	25–22	21–25	27–25	17–15	112–112	Report
17 Nov	20:30	Topvolley Antwerpen (Belgium)	3–2	(Germany) Evivo Düren	23–25	25–22	17–25	26–24	15–9	106–105	Report
18 Nov	20:30	Unicaja Almería (Spain)	3–1	(Greece) GC Lamia	25–19	24–26	25–21	25–15		99–81	Report
18 Nov	18:00	Raision Loimu (Finland)	1–3	(Netherlands) AB Groningen/Lycurgus	21–25	18–25	25–21	19–25		83–96	Report
17 Nov	18:30	Sun Volley Oulu (Finland)	0–3	(Poland) ZAKSA Kędzierzyn-Koźle	25–27	19–25	17–25			61–77	Report
18 Nov	18:00	VK Selver Tallinn (Estonia)	3–0	(Greece) Aris Thessaloniki	25–21	25–18	25–17			75–56	Report

==== Second leg ====
Date	Time		Score		Set 1	Set 2	Set 3	Set 4	Set 5	Total	Report
24 Nov	18:00	HAOK Mladost Zagreb (Croatia)	0–3	(Italy) Casa Modena	17–25	24–26	23–25			64–76	Report
23 Nov	19:00	TV Amriswil Volleyball (Switzerland)	3–2	(Cyprus) Anorthosis Famagusta	26–28	26–24	25–22	23–25	15–12	115–111	Report
Golden set		TV Amriswil Volleyball (Switzerland)	15–8	(Cyprus) Anorthosis Famagusta							
25 Nov	18:00	Kecskeméti SE (Hungary)	0–3	(Austria) Aon hotVolleys Vienna	18–25	14–25	24–26			56–76	Report
24 Nov	19:00	Ziraat Bankası Ankara (Turkey)	3–0	(Israel) Maccabi Tel Aviv	20–25	25–16	25–19			70–60	Report
24 Nov	20:00	Lausanne UC (Switzerland)	0–3	(Belgium) VC Euphony Asse-Lennik	21–25	15–25	21–25			57–75	Report
24 Nov	18:00	OK Vojvodina (Serbia)	1–3	(France) Stade Poitevin Poitiers	26–24	16–25	19–25	17–25		78–99	Report
Golden set		OK Vojvodina (Serbia)	11–15	(France) Stade Poitevin Poitiers							
24 Nov	16:00	Lokomotyv Kharkiv (Ukraine)	3–0	(Czech Republic) VK Ostrava	25–22	25–18	25–17			75–57	Report
24 Nov	20:00	Arago de Sète (France)	3–0	(Bosnia and Herzegovina) OK Kakanj	25–15	25–22	25–13			75–50	Report
25 Nov	18:00	Volleyball Kaposvár (Hungary)	1–3	(Poland) Asseco Resovia	21–25	28–26	21–25	21–25		91–101	Report
24 Nov	20:15	Tomis Constanța (Romania)	0–3	(Germany) Berlin Recycling Volleys	22–25	15–25	16–25			53–75	Report
25 Nov	17:00	Dinamo București (Romania)	3–0	(Slovenia) OK Salonit Anhovo Kanal	25–19	25–17	25–14			75–50	Report
Golden set		Dinamo București (Romania)	15–12	(Slovenia) OK Salonit Anhovo Kanal							
24 Nov	19:30	Evivo Düren (Germany)	3–2	(Belgium) Topvolley Antwerpen	25–23	22–25	25–22	24–26	15–12	111–108	Report
Golden set		Evivo Düren (Germany)	15–12	(Belgium) Topvolley Antwerpen							
25 Nov	20:30	GC Lamia (Greece)	3–1	(Spain) Unicaja Almería	25–22	25–21	17–25	25–19		92–87	Report
Golden set		GC Lamia (Greece)	12–15	(Spain) Unicaja Almería							
25 Nov	20:00	AB Groningen/Lycurgus (Netherlands)	3–2	(Finland) Raision Loimu	25–23	23–25	24–26	23–25	15–13	110–112	Report
24 Nov	18:00	ZAKSA Kędzierzyn-Koźle (Poland)	3–1	(Finland) Sun Volley Oulu	25–17	24–26	25–15	25–18		99–76	Report
23 Nov	20:00	Aris Thessaloniki (Greece)	3–2	(Estonia) VK Selver Tallinn	25–19	26–24	24–26	22–25	15–13	112–107	Report
Golden set		Aris Thessaloniki (Greece)	17–15	(Estonia) VK Selver Tallinn							

=== 8th Finals ===
Team 1	Agg.	Team 2	1st leg	2nd leg	Golden Set
Casa Modena (Italy)	6–1	(Switzerland) TV Amriswil Volleyball	3–1	3–0	
Aon hotVolleys Vienna (Austria)	1–6	(Turkey) Ziraat Bankası Ankara	1–3	0–3	
VC Euphony Asse-Lennik (Belgium)	6–0	(France) Stade Poitevin Poitiers	3–0	3–0	
Lokomotyv Kharkiv (Ukraine)	5–4	(France) Arago de Sète	3–1	2–3	11–15
Asseco Resovia (Poland)	6–3	(Germany) Berlin Recycling Volleys	3–2	3–1	
Dinamo București (Romania)	3–5	(Germany) Evivo Düren	3–2	0–3	12–15
Unicaja Almería (Spain)	6–4	(Netherlands) AB Groningen/Lycurgus	3–2	3–2	
ZAKSA Kędzierzyn-Koźle (Poland)	6–2	(Greece) Aris Thessaloniki	3–0	3–2	

==== First leg ====
Date	Time		Score		Set 1	Set 2	Set 3	Set 4	Set 5	Total	Report
9 Dec	20:30	Casa Modena (Italy)	3–1	(Switzerland) TV Amriswil Volleyball	22–25	25–22	25–11	25–19		97–77	Report
7 Dec	19:30	Aon hotVolleys Vienna (Austria)	1–3	(Turkey) Ziraat Bankası Ankara	26–24	22–25	20–25	19–25		87–99	Report
8 Dec	20:30	VC Euphony Asse-Lennik (Belgium)	3–0	(France) Stade Poitevin Poitiers	25–13	25–13	25–20			75–46	Report
9 Dec	17:00	Lokomotyv Kharkiv (Ukraine)	3–1	(France) Arago de Sète	24–26	26–24	25–23	29–27		104–100	Report
8 Dec	19:00	Asseco Resovia (Poland)	3–2	(Germany) Berlin Recycling Volleys	25–20	27–29	25–18	23–25	15–13	115–105	Report
7 Dec	17:00	Dinamo București (Romania)	3–2	(Germany) Evivo Düren	27–25	21–25	23–25	25–23	15–10	111–108	Report
9 Dec	20:30	Unicaja Almería (Spain)	3–2	(Netherlands) AB Groningen/Lycurgus	20–25	25–17	23–25	25–21	15–8	108–96	Report
8 Dec	18:00	ZAKSA Kędzierzyn-Koźle (Poland)	3–0	(Greece) Aris Thessaloniki	25–15	25–14	25–10			75–39	Report

==== Second leg ====
Date	Time		Score		Set 1	Set 2	Set 3	Set 4	Set 5	Total	Report
15 Dec	19:00	TV Amriswil Volleyball (Switzerland)	0–3	(Italy) Casa Modena	26–28	17–25	19–25			62–78	Report
15 Dec	19:00	Ziraat Bankası Ankara (Turkey)	3–0	(Austria) Aon hotVolleys Vienna	25–21	25–15	25–15			75–51	Report
14 Dec	20:00	Stade Poitevin Poitiers (France)	0–3	(Belgium) VC Euphony Asse-Lennik	20–25	20–25	19–25			59–75	Report
15 Dec	20:00	Arago de Sète (France)	3–2	(Ukraine) Lokomotyv Kharkiv	24–26	25–12	25–17	20–25	15–11	109–91	Report
Golden set		Arago de Sète (France)	15–11	(Ukraine) Lokomotyv Kharkiv							
15 Dec	19:30	Berlin Recycling Volleys (Germany)	1–3	(Poland) Asseco Resovia	25–23	22–25	23–25	20–25		90–98	Report
14 Dec	19:30	Evivo Düren (Germany)	3–0	(Romania) Dinamo București	25–16	25–14	25–15			75–45	Report
Golden set		Evivo Düren (Germany)	15–12	(Romania) Dinamo București							
14 Dec	20:00	AB Groningen/Lycurgus (Netherlands)	2–3	(Spain) Unicaja Almería	21–25	25–16	24–26	29–27	13–15	112–109	Report
14 Dec	20:00	Aris Thessaloniki (Greece)	2–3	(Poland) ZAKSA Kędzierzyn-Koźle	20–25	25–23	25–20	19–25	13–15	102–108	Report

=== 4th Finals ===
Team 1	Agg.	Team 2	1st leg	2nd leg	Golden Set
Casa Modena (Italy)	3–4	(Turkey) Ziraat Bankası Ankara	3–1	0–3	12–15
Euphony Asse-Lennik (Belgium)	3–5	(France) Arago de Sète	3–2	0–3	12–15
Asseco Resovia (Poland)	6–2	(Germany) Evivo Düren	3–0	3–2	
Unicaja Almería (Spain)	3–5	(Poland) ZAKSA Kędzierzyn-Koźle	3–2	0–3	7–15

==== First leg ====
Date	Time		Score		Set 1	Set 2	Set 3	Set 4	Set 5	Total	Report
6 Jan	18:00	Casa Modena (Italy)	3–1	(Turkey) Ziraat Bankası Ankara	25–23	25–21	21–25	31–29		102–98	Report
5 Jan	20:30	Euphony Asse-Lennik (Belgium)	3–2	(France) Arago de Sète	23–25	22–25	25–22	25–19	15–10	110–101	Report
6 Jan	19:00	Asseco Resovia (Poland)	3–0	(Germany) Evivo Düren	25–16	25–16	25–11			75–43	Report
5 Jan	19:00	Unicaja Almería (Spain)	3–2	(Poland) ZAKSA Kędzierzyn-Koźle	23–25	25–22	23–25	27–25	16–14	114–111	Report

==== Second leg ====
Date	Time		Score		Set 1	Set 2	Set 3	Set 4	Set 5	Total	Report
12 Jan	20:30	Ziraat Bankası Ankara (Turkey)	3–0	(Italy) Casa Modena	25–22	25–18	25–14			75–54	Report
Golden set		Ziraat Bankası Ankara (Turkey)	15–12	(Italy) Casa Modena							
12 Jan	20:00	Arago de Sète (France)	3–0	(Belgium) Euphony Asse-Lennik	25–17	25–19	25–20			75–56	Report
Golden set		Arago de Sète (France)	15–12	(Belgium) Euphony Asse-Lennik							
12 Jan	19:30	Evivo Düren (Germany)	2–3	(Poland) Asseco Resovia	25–22	18–25	25–23	25–27	7–15	100–112	Report
12 Jan	18:00	ZAKSA Kędzierzyn-Koźle (Poland)	3–0	(Spain) Unicaja Almería	25–19	25–15	25–21			75–55	Report
Golden set		ZAKSA Kędzierzyn-Koźle (Poland)	15–7	(Spain) Unicaja Almería							

== Challenge phase ==
Team 1	Agg.	Team 2	1st leg	2nd leg	Golden Set
CAI Teruel (Spain)	4–6	(Poland) Asseco Resovia	2–3	2–3	
Sisley Treviso (Italy)	6–4	(France) Arago de Sète	3–2	3–2	
CSKA Sofia (Bulgaria)	3–5	(Turkey) Ziraat Bankası Ankara	3–2	0–3	19–17
VfB Friedrichshafen (Germany)	3–4	(Poland) ZAKSA Kędzierzyn-Koźle	3–1	0–3	12–15

=== First leg ===
Date	Time		Score		Set 1	Set 2	Set 3	Set 4	Set 5	Total	Report
2 Feb	20:15	CAI Teruel (Spain)	2–3	(Poland) Asseco Resovia	15–25	25–21	26–24	22–25	15–17	103–112	Report
2 Feb	20:30	Sisley Treviso (Italy)	3–2	(France) Arago de Sète	23–25	26–24	22–25	26–24	15–11	112–109	Report
1 Feb	19:30	CSKA Sofia (Bulgaria)	3–2	(Turkey) Ziraat Bankası Ankara	28–26	25–23	20–25	22–25	16–14	111–113	Report
2 Feb	20:00	VfB Friedrichshafen (Germany)	3–1	(Poland) ZAKSA Kędzierzyn-Koźle	24–26	25–19	25–23	25–19		99–87	Report

=== Second leg ===
Date	Time		Score		Set 1	Set 2	Set 3	Set 4	Set 5	Total	Report
8 Feb	19:00	Asseco Resovia (Poland)	3–2	(Spain) CAI Teruel	25–11	23–25	25–15	25–19	15–10	113–80	Report
9 Feb	20:00	Arago de Sète (France)	2–3	(Italy) Sisley Treviso	20–25	25–20	13–25	25–19	10–15	93–104	Report
10 Feb	18:30	Ziraat Bankası Ankara (Turkey)	3–0	(Bulgaria) CSKA Sofia	25–23	25–23	25–15			75–61	Report
Golden set		Ziraat Bankası Ankara (Turkey)	17–19	(Bulgaria) CSKA Sofia							
9 Feb	18:00	ZAKSA Kędzierzyn-Koźle (Poland)	3–0	(Germany) VfB Friedrichshafen	25–22	25–20	25–16			75–58	Report
Golden set		ZAKSA Kędzierzyn-Koźle (Poland)	15–12	(Germany) VfB Friedrichshafen							

== Final phase ==
=== Semi finals ===
Team 1	Agg.	Team 2	1st leg	2nd leg	Golden Set
Asseco Resovia (Poland)	3–6	(Italy) Sisley Treviso	2–3	1–3	
CSKA Sofia (Bulgaria)	3–3	(Poland) ZAKSA Kędzierzyn-Koźle	3–0	0–3	12–15

==== First leg ====
Date	Time		Score		Set 1	Set 2	Set 3	Set 4	Set 5	Total	Report
23 Feb	20:30	Asseco Resovia (Poland)	2–3	(Italy) Sisley Treviso	25–19	23–25	25–23	22–25	12–15	107–107	Report
22 Feb	19:30	CSKA Sofia (Bulgaria)	3–0	(Poland) ZAKSA Kędzierzyn-Koźle	27–25	25–21	25–20			77–66	Report

==== Second leg ====
Date	Time		Score		Set 1	Set 2	Set 3	Set 4	Set 5	Total	Report
26 Feb	20:30	Sisley Treviso (Italy)	3–1	(Poland) Asseco Resovia	26–28	25–21	25–21	26–24		102–94	Report
27 Feb	15:00	ZAKSA Kędzierzyn-Koźle (Poland)	3–0	(Bulgaria) CSKA Sofia	25–23	33–31	25–22			83–76	Report
Golden set		ZAKSA Kędzierzyn-Koźle (Poland)	15–12	(Bulgaria) CSKA Sofia							

=== Final ===
==== First leg ====
Date	Time		Score		Set 1	Set 2	Set 3	Set 4	Set 5	Total	Report
9 Mar	20:30	Sisley Treviso (Italy)	2–3	(Poland) ZAKSA Kędzierzyn-Koźle	25–17	22–25	25–18	22–25	11–15	105–100	Report

==== Second leg ====
Date	Time		Score		Set 1	Set 2	Set 3	Set 4	Set 5	Total	Report
12 Mar	16:30	ZAKSA Kędzierzyn-Koźle (Poland)	1–3	(Italy) Sisley Treviso	25–19	21–25	20–25	19–25		85–94	Report
Golden set		ZAKSA Kędzierzyn-Koźle (Poland)	11–15	(Italy) Sisley Treviso							

== Final standing ==
Rank	Team
1st place, gold medalist(s)	(Italy) Sisley Treviso
2nd place, silver medalist(s)	(Poland) ZAKSA Kędzierzyn-Koźle
Semifinalists	(Poland) Asseco Resovia
Semifinalists	(Bulgaria) CSKA Sofia

2011 CEV Cup winner
(Italy)
Sisley Treviso
5th title

Marcelo Elgarten, Dávid Szabó, Alessandro Fei, Robert Horstink, Jiří Kovář, Samuele Papi, Alessandro Farina, Dante Boninfante, Giorgio De Togni, Rob Bontje, Gabriele Maruotti, Novica Bjelica
Head coach
Roberto Piazza
