= 2014–15 Superliga de Voleibol Masculina =

Superliga Masculina 2014–15
- League: Superliga Masculina
- Sport: volleyball
- Duration: October 11, 2014–March 28, 2015 (regular season); April 11–May 3 (playoffs)
- Teams: 11

Summary
- League champions: Unicaja Almería
- Runners-up: CAI Teruel
- Season MVP: Sérgio Luiz
- Promoted to Superliga 2: Textil Santanderina & Electrocash CCPH
- Relegated to Superliga 2: Emevé

Superliga Masculina seasons
- ← 2013–14 2015–16 →

Superliga de Voleibol Masculina 2014–15 was the 51st (LI) season since its establishment. The 2014–15 regular season started on October 11, 2014, and finished on March 28, 2015.

Championship playoffs began on 11 April. Starting with semifinals, the two semifinal winners will advance to the Final to fight for the championship title to the best of three matches.

Unicaja Almería won the championship by defeating 2013–14 season defending champions CAI Teruel, 3–1 in the Championship Final.

== Competition format ==
11 teams played in a two-rounds format. Upon completion of regular season, the top four teams play Championship's playoffs, while the bottom team is relegated to Superliga 2.

During regular season, a win by 3–0 or 3–1 means 3 points to winner team, while a 3–2 win, 2 points for winner team & 1 for loser team.

Championship playoffs is played to best of 3 games.

== 2014–15 season teams ==
2014–15 Superliga de Voleibol Masculina teams
Canary Islands

Team	Stadium	Capacity	City/Area
CAI Teruel	Los Planos	3,500	Teruel
Unicaja Almería	Moisés Ruiz	1,750	Almería
Ushuaïa Ibiza Voley	Es Viver	1,000	Ibiza Town
Vecindario ACE G.C.	Pabellón Municipal	3,000	Vecindario, Santa Lucía de Tirajana
Fundación Cajasol Juvasa	Los Montecillos	1,500	Dos Hermanas, Andalusia
UBE L'Illa-Grau	Ciutat Esportiva	700	Castellón de la Plana
Río Duero–San José	Los Pajaritos	2,000	Soria
Emevé	Palacio de Deportes	3,500	Lugo
VP Madrid	CDM Entrevías	500	Madrid
Textil Santanderina	Matilde de la Torre	1,000	Cabezón de la Sal
Electrocash CCPH	Juan Serrano Macayo	1,000	Cáceres

== Regular season standings ==
Pos	Team	Pld	W	L	Pts	SW	SL	SR	SPW	SPL	SPR	Qualification or relegation
1	Unicaja Almería	20	18	2	54	57	10	5.700	1625	1219	1.333	Qualified for Playoff
2	CAI Teruel	20	17	3	54	57	12	4.750	1661	1228	1.353	Qualified for Playoff
3	Río Duero–San José	20	15	5	44	49	24	2.042	1691	1528	1.107	Qualified for Playoff
4	Ushuaïa Ibiza Voley	20	13	7	38	43	28	1.536	1638	1557	1.052	Qualified for Playoff
5	Fundación Cajasol Juvasa	20	12	8	33	39	32	1.219	1573	1558	1.010	
6	Vecindario ACE G.C.	20	10	10	31	35	34	1.029	1486	1547	0.961	
7	Electrocash CCPH	20	9	11	24	30	43	0.698	1584	1654	0.958	
8	Textil Santanderina	20	7	13	21	29	46	0.630	1603	1719	0.933	
9	UBE L'Illa-Grau	20	4	16	14	22	50	0.440	1465	1675	0.875	
10	VP Madrid	20	4	16	13	16	51	0.314	1366	1620	0.843	
11	Emevé	20	1	19	4	11	58	0.190	1312	1699	0.772	Relegated

== Championship playoff ==
All times are CEST, except for Canary Islands which is WEST.

=== Bracket ===
- To best of three games.

Semi-finals
1	Unicaja Almería	3	3	3
4	Ushuaïa Ibiza Voley	1	0	0
2	CAI Teruel	3	3	3
3	Río Duero–San José	0	0	0

Final
1	Unicaja Almería	3	3	0	3
2	CAI Teruel	0	1	3	2

=== Semifinals ===
==== Match 1 ====
Date	Time		Score		Set 1	Set 2	Set 3	Set 4	Set 5	Total	Report
11 Apr	18:00	CAI Teruel	3–0	Río Duero–San José	25–18	25–18	25–22			75–58	Box Score
11 Apr	19:00	Unicaja Almería	3–1	Ushuaïa Ibiza Voley	25–14	25–21	22–25	25–9		97–69	Box Score

==== Match 2 ====
Date	Time		Score		Set 1	Set 2	Set 3	Set 4	Set 5	Total	Report
12 Apr	18:00	CAI Teruel	3–0	Río Duero–San José	25–19	25–13	25–19			75–51	Box Score
12 Apr	19:00	Unicaja Almería	3–0	Ushuaïa Ibiza Voley	28–26	25–19	25–19			78–64	Box Score

==== Match 3 ====
Date	Time		Score		Set 1	Set 2	Set 3	Set 4	Set 5	Total	Report
18 Apr	19:00	Río Duero–San José	0–3	CAI Teruel	22–25	9–25	24–26			55–76	Box Score
18 Apr	19:00	Ushuaïa Ibiza Voley	0–3	Unicaja Almería	23–25	19–25	17–25			59–75	Box Score

=== Final ===
==== Match 1 ====
Date	Time		Score		Set 1	Set 2	Set 3	Set 4	Set 5	Total	Report
25 Apr	19:00	Unicaja Almería	3–0	CAI Teruel	25–23	26–24	25–22			76–69	Box Score

==== Match 2 ====
Date	Time		Score		Set 1	Set 2	Set 3	Set 4	Set 5	Total	Report
26 Apr	19:30	Unicaja Almería	3–1	CAI Teruel	23–25	25–22	25–22	25–13		98–82	Box Score

==== Match 3 ====
Date	Time		Score		Set 1	Set 2	Set 3	Set 4	Set 5	Total	Report
2 May	18:00	CAI Teruel	3–0	Unicaja Almería	25–18	25–17	25–21			75–56	Box Score

==== Match 4 ====
Date	Time		Score		Set 1	Set 2	Set 3	Set 4	Set 5	Total	Report
3 May	18:00	CAI Teruel	2–3	Unicaja Almería	26–24	25–21	21–25	24–26	11–15	107–111	Box Score

- Final MVP: (Brazil) Sergio Luis Felix

2014–15 Superliga Masculina winners
(Andalusia)
Unicaja Almería
Tenth title

== Top scorers ==
(Regular season only.)

Rk	Name	Team	Points	Sets	PPS
1	(Brazil) Maxson Pereira	Electrocash CCPH	396	77	5,14
2	(Spain) Miguel Mateo	Textil Santanderina	376	74	5,08
3	(Austria) Thomas Zass	Unicaja Almería	362	79	4,58
4	(Spain) Manuel Salvador	Río Duero–San José	327	81	4,04
5	(Spain) Edmond Solanas	Ushuaïa Ibiza Voley	289	81	3,57
