= 2013–14 Superliga de Voleibol Masculina =

Superliga Masculina 2013–14
- League: Superliga Masculina
- Sport: volleyball
- Duration: October 12, 2013–March 29, 2014 (regular season); April 5–May 7 (playoffs)
- Teams: 11

Summary
- League champions: CAI Teruel
- Runners-up: Unicaja Almería
- Promoted to Superliga 2: Emevé Élide & VP Madrid
- Relegated to Superliga 2: Club Vigo

Superliga Masculina seasons
- ← 2012–13 2014–15 →

Superliga de Voleibol Masculina 2013–14 was the 50th (L) season since its establishment. The 2013–14 regular season started on October 12, 2013, and finished on March 29, 2014.

Championship playoffs began on 5 April. Starting with semifinals, the two semifinal winners will advance to the Final to fight for the championship title.

CAI Teruel became new league champions by defeating defending champion, Unicaja Almeria 3–2 in the Final.

== Competition format ==
11 teams played in a two-rounds format. Upon completion of regular season, the top four teams play Championship's playoffs, while the bottom team is relegated to Superliga 2.

During regular season, a win by 3–0 or 3–1 means 3 points to winner team, while a 3–2 win, 2 points for winner team & 1 for loser team.

Championship playoffs is played to best of 3 games.

== 2013–14 season teams ==
2013–14 Superliga de Voleibol Masculina teams
Canary Islands

Team	Stadium	Capacity	City/Area
CAI Teruel	Los Planos	3,500	Teruel
Unicaja Almería	Moisés Ruiz	1,750	Almería
Río Duero–San José	Los Pajaritos	2,000	Soria
Fundación Cajasol Juvasa	Los Montecillos	1,500	Dos Hermanas, Andalusia
Ushuaïa Ibiza Voley	Es Viver	1,000	Ibiza Town
UBE L'Illa-Grau	Ciutat Esportiva	700	Castellón de la Plana
Vecindario ACE G.C.	Pabellón Municipal	3,000	Vecindario, Santa Lucía de Tirajana
Andorra	Poliesportiu d'Andorra	4,000	Andorra la Vella
Vigo	Pavillón de Coia	1,300	Vigo
VP Madrid	CDM Entrevías	500	Madrid
Emevé Élide	Palacio de Deportes	3,500	Lugo

== 2013–14 regular season standings ==
#	Team	P	Wx3	Wx2	Lx1	Lx0	Sets+	Sets–	Points+	Points–	Pts	Qualification or relegation
1	CAI Teruel	20	19	1	0	0	60	4	1592	1149	59	Final playoffs
2	Unicaja Almería	20	15	0	3	2	52	19	1676	1402	48	Final playoffs
3	Ushuaïa Ibiza Voley	20	12	3	1	4	48	24	1625	1459	43	Final playoffs
4	Vecindario ACE G.C.	20	12	1	3	4	47	28	1714	1558	41	Final playoffs
5	Fundación Cajasol Juvasa	20	9	3	0	8	38	32	1581	1481	33	
6	UBE L'Illa-Grau	20	8	3	1	8	39	38	1712	1705	31	
7	Río Duero–San José	20	8	1	2	9	34	39	1593	1639	28	
8	Emevé Élide	20	4	4	1	11	29	47	1630	1803	21	
9	Andorra	20	2	0	6	12	20	54	1479	1713	12	
10	VP Madrid	20	2	1	2	15	17	54	1414	1696	10	
11	Vigo	20	0	2	0	18	13	58	1313	1724	4	Relegated

== Championship playoffs ==
All times are CEST, except for Canary Islands which is WEST.

=== Bracket ===
- To best of three games.

Semi-finals
1	CAI Teruel	3	3	3
4	Vecindario ACE G.C.	0	0	0
2	Unicaja Almería	2	3	3	3
3	Ushuaïa Ibiza Voley	3	1	0	1

Final
1	CAI Teruel	1	3	2	3	3
2	Unicaja Almería	3	0	3	1	0

=== Semifinals ===
==== Match 1 ====
Date	Time		Score		Set 1	Set 2	Set 3	Set 4	Set 5	Total	Report
5 Apr	18:00	CAI Teruel	3–0	Vecindario ACE G.C.	25–16	25–20	25–22			75–58	Box Score
5 Apr	19:00	Unicaja Almería	2–3	Ushuaïa Ibiza Voley	25–22	27–25	19–25	22–25	15–17	108–114	Box Score

==== Match 2 ====
Date	Time		Score		Set 1	Set 2	Set 3	Set 4	Set 5	Total	Report
6 Apr	12:00	CAI Teruel	3–0	Vecindario ACE G.C.	27–25	25–23	25–16			77–64	Box Score
6 Apr	19:00	Unicaja Almería	3–1	Ushuaïa Ibiza Voley	17–25	25–20	25–17	25–20		92–82	Box Score

==== Match 3 ====
Date	Time		Score		Set 1	Set 2	Set 3	Set 4	Set 5	Total	Report
12 Apr	18:00	Vecindario ACE G.C.	0–3	CAI Teruel	18–25	21–25	11–25			50–75	Box Score
12 Apr	19:00	Ushuaïa Ibiza Voley	0–3	Unicaja Almería	14–25	16–25	20–25			50–75	Box Score

==== Match 4 ====
Date	Time		Score		Set 1	Set 2	Set 3	Set 4	Set 5	Total	Report
13 Apr	18:00	Ushuaïa Ibiza Voley	1–3	Unicaja Almería	25–19	23–25	22–25	20–25		90–94	Box Score

=== Final ===
==== Match 1 ====
Date	Time		Score		Set 1	Set 2	Set 3	Set 4	Set 5	Total	Report
26 Apr	18:00	CAI Teruel	1–3	Unicaja Almería	25–15	23–25	22–25	20–25		90–90	Box Score

==== Match 2 ====
Date	Time		Score		Set 1	Set 2	Set 3	Set 4	Set 5	Total	Report
27 Apr	19:00	CAI Teruel	3–0	Unicaja Almería	34–32	25–16	25–21			84–69	Box Score

==== Match 3 ====
Date	Time		Score		Set 1	Set 2	Set 3	Set 4	Set 5	Total	Report
2 May	20:30	Unicaja Almería	3–2	CAI Teruel	25–21	19–25	17–25	25–20	15–13	101–104	Box Score

==== Match 4 ====
Date	Time		Score		Set 1	Set 2	Set 3	Set 4	Set 5	Total	Report
3 May	19:00	Unicaja Almería	1–3	CAI Teruel	25–17	16–25	23–25	16–25		80–92	Box Score

==== Match 5 ====
Date	Time		Score		Set 1	Set 2	Set 3	Set 4	Set 5	Total	Report
7 May	20:00	CAI Teruel	3–0	Unicaja Almería	25–23	25–22	26–24			76–69	Box Score

- Final MVP: Víctor Viciana

2013–14 Superliga Masculina winners
(Aragon)
CAI Teruel
Fifth title

== Top scorers ==
(This statistics includes regular season and playoff matches.)

Rk	Name	Team	Points	Sets	PPS
1	(Cuba) Osveny Sánchez	Cajasol Juvasa	313	53	5,906
2	(Spain) Fran Ruiz	Fundación Cajasol Juvasa	342	70	4,886
3	(Spain) Semidán Deniz	Vecindario ACE G.C.	367	78	4,705
4	(Brazil) Guilherme Hage	Unicaja Almería	355	78	4,551
5	(Uruguay) Nicolás Ronchi	Ushuaïa Ibiza Voley	363	81	4,481
