= Real Madrid Voleibol =

Spanish volleyball club

Real Madrid
- Full name: Club Voleibol Real Madrid
- Founded: 1954
- Dissolved: 1983; 43 years ago
- Ground: Paseo de la Castellana, Madrid (Capacity: 4,000)
- Chairman: Antonio Gutiérrez
- Manager: Chupi Pérez
- League: Superliga Masculina
- 1982–83: 1°

Uniforms
| Home | Away |

Real Madrid Voleibol was the volleyball section of Real Madrid CF. The sport was added in 1954, following the club policy to expand. At the time of the section's dissolution in 1983, it was the third most successful section of Real Madrid next after the football and basketball teams.

== History ==
Real Madrid Voleibol was established in 1954. Real Madrid have won the Championship of Spain on 7 occasions and the Copa del Rey a record 12 times.

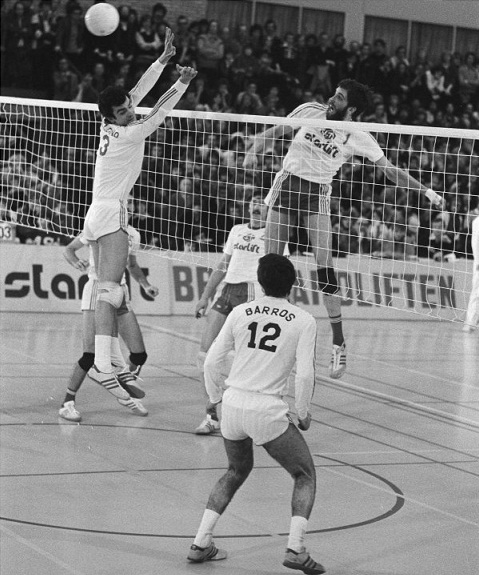
Real Madrid playing the semi-finals of the 1977–78 European Cup. It has been the most successful campaign of a Spanish team in the top European club competition to date

Like some other sections of Real Madrid, it had to close after the 1982–83 season due to economic mismanagement. Despite that, it remains one of the most successful Spanish volleyball teams. The club has won a combined total of nineteen domestic titles, including six domestic doubles.

The club's best international performance occurred during the 1977–78 season when they reached the semi-finals of the European Cup, before being defeated by the Dutch team, Starlift Blokkeer. It remains the best performance by a Spanish team in the CEV Champions League. The club's first participation in the CEV Champions League occurred in the 1972–73 season where they were eliminated in the round of 16 by a Polish club Resovia Rzeszów. In both of those seasons, the teams Real Madrid had lost to went on to become the runners-up of each edition.

The unexpected closure of the section after the successful 1982–83 season, during which the club won a domestic double, was motivated by years of economic mismanagement. In the following season the club ceded the federative rights to the Club Volleyball Madrid sponsored by the health company Sanitas, inheriting its sports squad as well as the right to participate in the CEV Champions League. In his act of presentation, Real Madrid CF President Luis de Carlos lamented the closure of the section, but argued that the section had a limited impact and scope, despite its success. In the last season of the club's existence, it recorded a mere 650 spectators throughout the entire league season.

== Notable players ==
- (North Macedonia) Vladimir Bogoevski
- (Spain) Miguel Ocón
- (Spain) Chupi Pérez
- (Spain) Julio Díaz
- (Spain) Miguel Ángel Gómez Lizcano
- (Spain) Luis Hernández Cotter
- (Spain) Feliciano Mayoral
- (Spain) Míguel Ángel Pérez Álvarez
- (Spain) Luis Álvarez Gómez
- (Spain) Francisco Sánchez
- (Spain) Jaime Fernández Barros
- (Spain) Javier Carro
- (Spain) Javier Jesús Gastón
- (Finland) Olavi Leinonen
- (Finland) Aulis Rissanen

== Notable Coaches ==
- (Socialist Federal Republic of Yugoslavia) Miroslav Vorgich
- (Socialist Federal Republic of Yugoslavia) Vlado Bogoevski
- (Spain) Chupi Pérez

== Honours ==
- Superliga (7)
  - Winners : 1972, 1976, 1977, 1978, 1979, 1980, 1983
  - Runners-up : 1965, 1971, 1974, 1975, 1981, 1982
- Copa del Rey (12, record)
  - Winners : 1954, 1956, 1960, 1969, 1973, 1976, 1977, 1978, 1979, 1980, 1981, 1983
  - Runners-up : 1957, 1961, 1963, 1971, 1974
