= Atlético Madrid Voleibol =

Spanish volleyball club

- Full name: Club Voleibol Atlético Madrid
- Founded: 1966
- Dissolved: 1984
- Ground: Madrid
- Chairman: UNKNOWN
- Manager: UNKNOWN
- Captain: UNKNOWN
- League: Superliga Masculina
- 1983–84: Superliga Masculina,
- Website: Club home page

Uniforms
Home	Away

Atlético Madrid Voleibol also known as ATM Voleibol was a Spanish men's volleyball club from Madrid and it was competing in the Spanish Superliga.

== History ==
The club was founded in 1966, then dissolved by 1984.

== Honours ==
- Superliga : 5
  - 1969, 1970, 1971, 1974, 1975
- Copa del Rey : 5
  - 1970, 1971, 1972, 1974, 1975

== Seasons results ==
Competition	Season	Position	Competition	Season	Position	Competition	Season	Position	Competition	Season	Position
Superliga											
Superliga											
Superliga											
