= FC Barcelona Voleibol =

Spanish professional Men's Volleyball team

- Full name: muth Barcelona
- Nickname: Azulgranas, Blaugranas, Culés, Barça
- Founded: 1970
- Ground: Parc Esportiu Llobregat, Barcelona (Capacity: 2,500)
- Chairman: Vacant
- League: Superliga Masculina
- 2022–23: Superliga Masculina,
- Website: (in Catalan) Club home page

Uniforms
| Home | Away |

FC Barcelona Voleibol also known as FCB Voleibol is a Spanish men's volleyball club from Barcelona and currently plays in the Spanish Superliga.

== History ==
The club was founded in 1970. It has since become one of the most successful volleyball teams in Spain. The team plays in the Spanish Superliga, which is the top professional volleyball league in Spain. The team is known for its aggressive style of play, with a focus on strong serving and attacking. Over the years, FC Barcelona has won many titles, including the Spanish 2nd superliga. The team has also represented Spain in international competitions, including the FIVB Club World Championship and CEV Champions League.

== Honours ==
- Spanish Second Division

Winners (2): 2008, 2021-22

- Catalan League

Winners (8): 1985, 1991, 1994, 2010, 2011, 2012, 2018, 2020

- Copa Príncipe

Winners (2): 2008, 2020

- Catalan Super League

Winners (1): 2022

== Notable players ==
- (Spain) Cosme Prenafeta García
