= Superliga 2 de Voleibol Masculina =

Superliga Masculina 2
- Current season, competition or edition: 2017–18 Superliga 2 de Voleibol Masculina
- Sport: volleyball
- No. of teams: 10 on Group A 9 on Group B
- Country: Spain
- Most recent champion: UBE L'Illa-Grau (2016–17)
- Level on pyramid: 2
- Promotion to: Superliga
- Relegation to: Primera División
- Website: rfevb.com

The Superliga 2 de Voleibol Masculina (SM-2), is the second category league of Spanish Volleyball, under the Superliga de Voleibol Masculina. The administration of the league is carried out by the Real Federación Española de Voleibol.

== Champions by year ==
Season	Champion	Runners-up
2007–08	FC Barcelona	Vigo Valery Karpin
2008–09	Puerto Real	Unicaja Almería B
2009–10	Vigo	Cajasol Juvasa
2010–11	Voley Guada	UBE L'Illa-Grau
2011–12	CyL Palencia 2014	Pachá Ibiza Voley
2012–13	Almoradí	CyL Palencia 2014
2013–14	Textil Santanderina	Electrocash CCPH
2014–15	Mediterráneo	CyL Palencia 2016
2015–16	Ca'n Ventura Palma	FC Barcelona
2016–17	UBE L'Illa-Grau	Tarragona 2018 SPSP
2017–18		

== See also ==
- Superliga de Voleibol Masculina
- Superliga Femenina de Voleibol
- Superliga 2 Femenina de Voleibol
