= Daniel Rocamora =

Spanish volleyball player (born 1988)

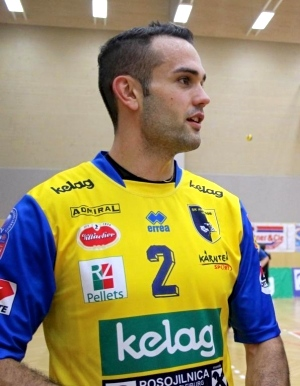

Personal information
- Full name: Daniel Rocamora Blázquez
- Nationality: Spanish
- Born: 27 May 1988 (age 38); Barcelona, Catalonia, Spain
- Height: 2.03 m (6 ft 8 in)
- Weight: 104 kg (229 lb)
- Spike: 348 cm (137 in)
- Block: 332 cm (131 in)

Volleyball information
- Number: 9 (national team)

Career
Years	Teams
2014–15; 2015–16; 2016–	SK Posojilnica Aich/Dob; Unirea Del; TV Schönenwerd

National team
2015–	Spain
Medal record
Men's volleyball
Representing Spain
Mediterranean Games
Silver medal – second place	2009 Pescara	Team

Daniel Rocamora Blázquez (born 27 May 1988) is a Spanish male volleyball player. He is part of the Spain men's national volleyball team. On club level he plays for TV Schönenwerd.
