= CV Pòrtol =

Spanish volleyball club

Podes i Tales Pòrtol
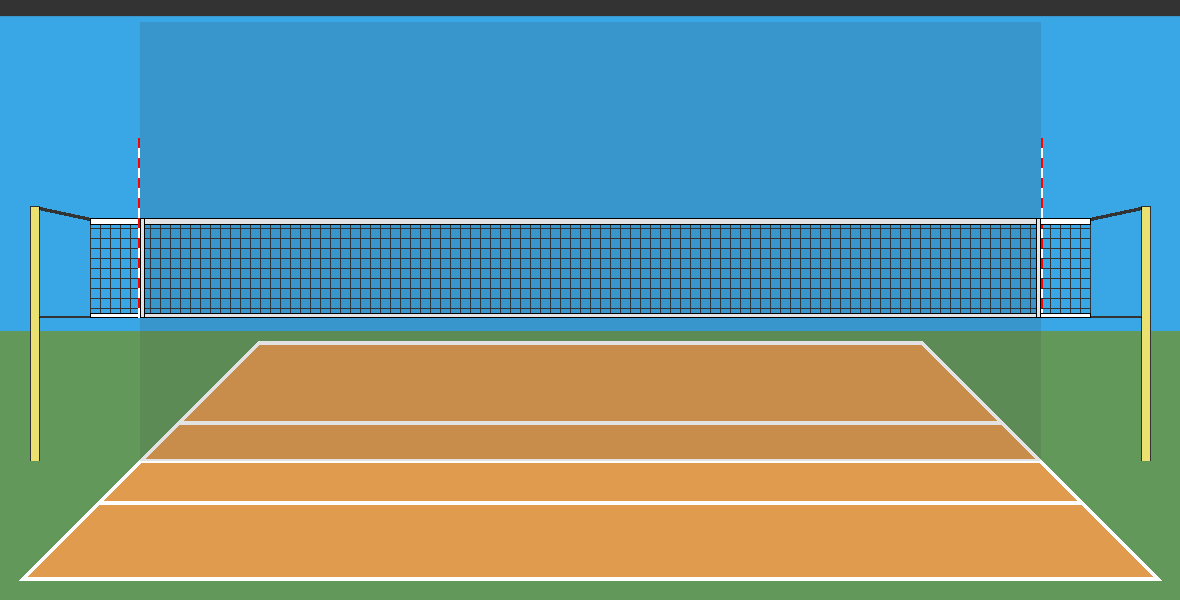
- Full name: Club Voleibol Pòrtol
- Founded: 1993
- Ground: Poliesportiu Blanquerna, Pont d'Inca, Balearic Islands, Spain
- Chairman: (Spain) Carmen Gayà
- Manager: (Spain) Vincent Rodríguez
- League: M: Primera Balear; W: M: Primera Balear
- 2012–13: M: Primera Balear, 3rd W: Primera Balear, 4th

Club Voleibol Pòrtol is a professional volleyball team based in Palma de Mallorca, Spain. It plays in the 1ª Balear de Voleibol after its renounce to play in Superliga just before 2011–12 season. The team won the 2023 Spain Alevín championships.

== Trophies ==
- Superliga (3)
  - Winner : 2006, 2007, 2008
  - Runner up : 2005
- Copa del Rey (2)
  - Winner : 2005, 2006
- Supercopa de España (3)
  - Winner : 2005, 2007, 2008
- CEV Cup
  - Runner up : 2006
- CEV Challenge Cup
  - Runner up : 2005

== Notable former players ==
- (Argentina) Alexis González
- (France) Stéphane Antiga
- (France) Sébastien Ruette
- (Germany) Axel Jennewein
- (Spain) Enrique de la Fuente
- (Spain) Guillermo Falasca
- (Spain) Miguel Ángel Falasca
- (Spain) Julián García Torres
- (Spain) José Luis Moltó
- (Spain) Ibán Pérez
- (Spain) Ernesto Rodríguez
- (Venezuela) Iván Márquez
- (Venezuela) Luis Díaz
