= Superliga de Voleibol Masculina =

Spanish volleyball league

Superliga Masculina
- Current season, competition or edition: 2025–26 Superliga de Voleibol Masculina
- Sport: Volleyball
- Founded: 1965
- No. of teams: 12
- Country: Spain
- Most recent champion: Guaguas (2025–26)
- Most titles: Almería, 12 titles
- Broadcasters: RFEVB streaming TV Canaria
- Level on pyramid: 1
- Relegation to: Superliga 2
- Domestic cup: Copa del Rey
- Website: rfevb.com

The Superliga de Voleibol Masculina, (SVM) is the top level of the Spanish volleyball. The championship was founded in 1983. Formerly known as Campeonato Nacional de División de Honor Masculina, and, since 1983 as the current name. The administration of the league is carried out by the Real Federación Española de Voleibol.

== Competition format ==
9 teams played in a two-round format. Upon completion of regular season, the top four teams play Championship's playoffs, while the bottom team is relegated to Superliga 2.

During regular season, a win by 3–0 or 3–1 means 3 points to winner team, while a 3–2 win, 2 points for winner team & 1 for loser team.

Championship playoffs includes quarterfinals, semifinals and the Final and it's played to best of 3 games.

== Champions by season ==
=== División de Honor ===
Season	Champion
1965	Hispano Francès Barcelona
1966	Picadero-Damm Barcelona
1967	Hispano Francès Barcelona
1968	Hispano Francès Barcelona
1969	Atlético de Madrid
1970	Atlético de Madrid
1971	Atlético de Madrid
1972	Real Madrid
1973	Hispano Francès Barcelona
1974	Atlético de Madrid

Season	Champion
1975	Atlético de Madrid
1976	Real Madrid
1977	Real Madrid
1978	Real Madrid
1979	Real Madrid
1980	Real Madrid
1981	Son Amar Palma
1982	Son Amar Palma
1983	Real Madrid

=== Superliga Masculina ===
Season	Champion
1984	Son Amar
1985	Salesianos Atocha
1986	Son Amar
1987	Son Amar
1988	Son Amar
1989	Son Amar
1990	Constructora Atlántica Canaria
1991	Gran Canaria
1992	Gran Canaria
1993	Gran Canaria
1994	Calvo Sotelo Gran Canaria
1995	Grupo Duero
1996	Caja Salamanca y Soria
1997	Unicaja Almería
1998	Unicaja Almería
1999	Numancia Caja Duero
2000	Unicaja Almería
2001	Unicaja Almería
2002	Unicaja Almería
2003	Unicaja Almería
2004	Unicaja Almería
2005	Unicaja Almería

Season	Champion
2006	Son Amar Palma
2007	Drac Palma
2008	Drac Palma
2009	CAI Voleibol Teruel
2010	CAI Voleibol Teruel
2011	CAI Voleibol Teruel
2012	Caja3 Teruel
2013	Unicaja Almería
2014	CAI Teruel
2015	Unicaja Almería
2016	Unicaja Almería
2017	Ca'n Ventura Palma
2018	Teruel
2019	Teruel
2020	Season suspended due to COVID-19
2021	Guaguas
2022	Unicaja Costa de Almería
2023	Guaguas
2024	Guaguas
2025	Guaguas
2026	Guaguas

=== Titles by team ===
Team	# Titles	Season
(Andalusia) Unicaja Almería	12	1997, 1998, 2000, 2000, 2002, 2003, 2004, 2005, 2013, 2015, 2016, 2022
(Community of Madrid) Real Madrid	7	1972, 1976, 1977, 1978, 1979, 1980 & 1983
(Balearic Islands) Son Amar Palma	7	1981, 1982, 1984, 1986, 1987, 1988 & 1989
(Aragon) CAI Teruel	7	2009, 2010, 2011, 2012, 2014, 2018, 2019
(Community of Madrid) Atlético de Madrid	5	1969, 1970, 1971, 1974 & 1975
(Canary Islands) Calvo Sotelo Gran Canaria	5	1990, 1991, 1992, 1993 & 1994
(Canary Islands) Guaguas	5	2021, 2023, 2024, 2025 & 2026
(Catalonia) Hispano Francès	4	1965, 1967, 1968 & 1973
(Castile and León) Numancia CMA Soria	3	1995, 1996 & 1999
(Balearic Islands) Pòrtol	3	2006, 2007 & 2008
(Catalonia) Picadero	1	1966
(Community of Madrid) Salesianos Madrid	1	1985
(Balearic Islands) Ca'n Ventura Palma	1	2017

== See also ==
- Copa del Rey de Voleibol
- Supercopa de España de Voleibol
- Superliga 2 de Voleibol Masculina
