= Copa del Rey de Voleibol =

Sports competition

- Sport: Volleyball
- Founded: 1950
- No. of teams: 6
- Country: Spain
- Most recent champion: CV Manacor (2026)
- Broadcasters: RTVE Play; Teledeporte; TV Canaria
- Website: Official website

Copa del Rey de Voleibol is the second top flight volleyball competition played in Spain. The inaugural edition was played in 1950. It is hosted by Real Federación Española de Voleibol. The competition was renamed "Copa del Generalisimo" until 1976 due to the Francoist regime.

The top six teams at half-season in Superliga play the Copa del Rey, generally in late January.

== Winners by year ==
Year	Winners	Region
1951	Bomberos	(Catalonia)
1952	Club Piratas	(Community of Madrid)
1953	Hispano Francés	(Catalonia)
1954	Real Madrid	(Community of Madrid)
1955	Bomberos	(Catalonia)
1956	Real Madrid	(Community of Madrid)
1957	Bomberos	(Catalonia)
1958	Bomberos	(Catalonia)
1959	Hernán	(Catalonia)
1960	Real Madrid	(Community of Madrid)
1961	Universitario	(Community of Madrid)
1962	Universitario	(Community of Madrid)
1963	Picadero	(Catalonia)
1964	Hispano Francés	(Catalonia)
1965	Picadero Damm	(Catalonia)
1966	Hispano Francés	(Catalonia)
1967	Hispano Francés	(Catalonia)
1968	Hispano Francés	(Catalonia)
1969	Real Madrid	(Community of Madrid)
1970	Atlético Madrid	(Community of Madrid)
1971	Atlético Madrid	(Community of Madrid)
1972	Atlético Madrid	(Community of Madrid)
1973	Real Madrid	(Community of Madrid)
1974	Atlético Madrid	(Community of Madrid)
1975	Atlético Madrid	(Community of Madrid)
1976	Real Madrid	(Community of Madrid)
1977	Real Madrid	(Community of Madrid)
1978	Real Madrid	(Community of Madrid)
1979	Real Madrid	(Community of Madrid)
1980	Real Madrid	(Community of Madrid)
1981	Real Madrid	(Community of Madrid)
1982	Son Amar Palma	(Balearic Islands)
1983	Real Madrid	(Community of Madrid)
1984	Son Amar Palma	(Balearic Islands)
1985	Sanitas	(Community of Madrid)
1986	Son Amar Palma	(Balearic Islands)
1987	Son Amar Palma	(Balearic Islands)
1988	Son Amar Palma	(Balearic Islands)

Year	Winners	Region
1989	Guaguas	(Canary Islands)
1990	Son Amar Palma	(Balearic Islands)
1991	Gran Canaria	(Canary Islands)
1992	Gran Canaria	(Canary Islands)
1993	Gran Canaria	(Canary Islands)
1994	Numancia Caja Duero	(Castile and León)
1995	Unicaja Almería	(Andalusia)
1996	Gran Canaria	(Canary Islands)
1997	Gran Canaria	(Canary Islands)
1998	Unicaja Almería	(Andalusia)
1999	Unicaja Almería	(Andalusia)
2000	Unicaja Almería	(Andalusia)
2001	Numancia Caja Duero	(Castile and León)
2002	Unicaja Almería	(Andalusia)
2003	Elche	(Valencian Community)
2004	Arona Playa de Las Américas	(Canary Islands)
2005	Son Amar Palma	(Balearic Islands)
2006	Son Amar Palma	(Balearic Islands)
2007	Unicaja Arukasur Almería	(Andalusia)
2008	Numancia CMA Soria	(Castile and León)
2009	Unicaja Almería	(Andalusia)
2010	Unicaja Almería	(Andalusia)
2011	CAI Voleibol Teruel	(Aragon)
2012	Caja 3 Voleibol Teruel	(Aragon)
2013	CAI Voleibol Teruel	(Aragon)
2014	Unicaja Almería	(Andalusia)
2015	CAI Teruel	(Aragon)
2016	Unicaja Almería	(Andalusia)
2017	Ca'n Ventura Palma	(Balearic Islands)
2018	CV Teruel	(Aragon)
2019	Unicaja Almería	(Andalusia)
2020	CV Teruel	(Aragon)
2021	CV Guaguas	(Canary Islands)
2022	CV Melilla	(Melilla)
2023	Río Duero Soria	(Castile and León)
2024	CV Guaguas	(Canary Islands)
2025	CV Guaguas	(Canary Islands)
2026	CV Manacor	(Balearic Islands)

== Wins by teams ==
Team	Titles	Years
(Community of Madrid) Real Madrid	12	(1954, 1956, 1960, 1969, 1973, 1976, 1977, 1978, 1979, 1980, 1981, 1983).
(Andalusia) Unicaja Almería	11	(1995, 1998, 1999, 2000, 2002, 2007, 2009, 2010, 2014, 2016, 2019).
(Canary Islands) Calvo Sotelo Gran Canaria	6	(1989, 1991, 1992, 1993, 1996, 1997).
(Balearic Islands) Son Amar Palma	6	(1982, 1984, 1986, 1987, 1988, 1990).
(Aragon) CV Teruel	6	(2011, 2012, 2013, 2015, 2018, 2020).
(Catalonia) Hispano Francés	5	(1953, 1964, 1966, 1967, 1968).
(Community of Madrid) Atlético Madrid	5	(1970, 1971, 1972, 1974, 1975).
(Catalonia) Bomberos	4	(1951, 1955, 1957, 1958).
(Castile and León) Numancia CMA Soria	3	(1994, 2001, 2008)
(Canary Islands) CV Guaguas	3	(2021, 2024, 2025).
(Community of Madrid) Universitario	2	(1961, 1962).
(Catalonia) Picadero	2	(1963, 1965).
(Balearic Islands) Pòrtol	2	(2005, 2006).
(Community of Madrid) Club Piratas	1	(1952).
(Catalonia) Hernán	1	(1959).
(Community of Madrid) Sanitas	1	(1985).
(Valencian Community) Elche	1	(2003).
(Canary Islands) Arona Playa de Las Américas	1	(2004).
(Balearic Islands) Ca'n Ventura Palma	1	(2017).
CV Melilla	1	(2022).
(Castile and León) Río Duero Soria	1	(2023).
(Balearic Islands) CV Manacor	1	(2026).

== See also ==
- Superliga Masculina
- Supercopa de España
