= Supercopa de España de Voleibol =

Supercopa de Voleibol
- Sport: Volleyball
- Founded: 1990/2002
- No. of teams: 2
- Country: Spain
- Most recent champion: Guaguas (2025)
- Most titles: Teruel (9)
- Broadcasters: RTVE Play; Teledeporte; RFEVB streaming
- Website: RFEVB

The Supercopa de España de Voleibol is an annual Spanish volleyball tournament played by the Superliga champions and Copa del Rey winners. It's managed by Real Federación Española de Voleibol.

The tournament was established in 1990 but it was discontinued from that year to 2002. It's played around early October.

== Winners by year ==
Year	Venue	Champion	Runners-up	Score	ref
1990	Las Palmas	Palma Orisba	Constructora Atlántica	3–0	
1991–93	DNP				
1994	Soria	Grupo Duero	Pepsi Gran Canaria	3-0	
1995	Almería	Unicaja Almería	Caja Salamanca y Soria	3-2	
1996		Gran Canaria	Caja Salamanca y Soria	3-1	
1997–01	DNP				
2002	El Puerto de Santa María	Unicaja Almería	PTV Málaga	3–0	
2003	Elche	Unicaja Almería	J'Hayber Elche	3–2	
2004	Almería	Arona Playa de Las Américas	Unicaja Almería	3–2	
2005	Miranda de Ebro	Son Amar Palma	Unicaja Almería	3–0	
2006	Puertollano	Unicaja Arukasur	Drac Palma	3–1	
2007	Laredo	Drac Palma	Unicaja Arukasur	3–0	
2008	Albacete	Drac Palma	CMA Soria	3–1	
2009	Teruel	CAI Teruel	Unicaja Almería	3–1	
2010	Almería	Unicaja Almería	CAI Teruel	3–1	
2011	Teruel	Unicaja Almería	Caja3 Teruel	3–0	
2012	Soria	CAI Teruel	CMA Soria	3–0	
2013	Teruel	CAI Teruel	Unicaja Almería	3–0	
2014	Albacete	CAI Teruel	Unicaja Almería	3–0	
2015	El Ejido	Unicaja Almería	CAI Teruel	3–2	
2016	Teruel	CAI Teruel	Unicaja Almería	3–2	
2017	Teruel	CV Teruel	Urbia Voley Palma	3–0	
2018	Teruel	CV Teruel	Unicaja Almería	3–0	
2019	Teruel	CV Teruel	Unicaja Costa de Almería	3–0	
2020	Teruel	CV Teruel	Unicaja Costa de Almería	3–0	
2021	Las Palmas	CV Guaguas	Feníe Energía Mallorca VP	3–0	
2022	Almería	Melilla Sport Capital	Unicaja Almería	3–1	
2023	Las Palmas	CV Guaguas	Río Duero Soria	3–2	
2024	Las Palmas	CV Guaguas	Unicaja Almería	3–0	
2025	Valladolid	CV Guaguas	Grupo Herce Soria	3–0	

== Wins by club ==
Team	Titles	Runner-up	Champion Years
CV Teruel	9	3	2009, 2012, 2013, 2014, 2016, 2017, 2018, 2019, 2020
Unicaja Almería	7	12	1995, 2002, 2003, 2006, 2010, 2011, 2015
Guaguas	4	0	2021, 2023, 2024, 2025
Pòrtol	3	1	2005, 2007, 2008
Numancia Voley	1	4	1994
CV Calvo Sotelo	1	2	1996
Palma Orisba	1	0	1990
Arona Playa de Las Américas	1	0	2004
Melilla	1	0	2022
Voley Palma	0	2	
Río Duero Soria	0	2	
PTV Málaga	0	1	
J'Hayber Elche	0	1	

== See also ==
- Superliga de Voleibol Masculina
- Copa del Rey de Voleibol
