= CV Teruel =

Spanish volleyball club

- Full name: Club Voleibol Teruel
- Founded: 1991
- Ground: Los Planos, Teruel (Capacity: 3,500)
- Chairman: (Spain) Carlos Ranera
- Manager: (Spain) Miguel Rivera
- League: Superliga
- 2018-19: Superliga, 2nd / RU

Uniforms
Home	Away

Club Voleibol Teruel is a professional volleyball team based in Teruel, Spain. It plays in the Superliga and in the CEV Cup.

== Trophies ==
- Superliga: 7
  - 2009, 2010, 2011, 2012, 2014, 2018, 2019
- Copa del Rey: 6
  - 2011, 2012, 2013, 2015, 2018, 2020
- Supercopa de España: 8
  - 2009, 2012, 2013, 2014, 2016, 2017, 2018, 2019

== Notable former players ==
- (Croatia) Jure Kvesič (2005–06)
- (Dominican Republic) José Miguel Cáceres (2010–11)
- (Dominican Republic) Víctor Batista (2009–11)
- (Spain) Luis Pedro Suela (2009–11)
- (Spain) Manuel Sevillano (2011–13)
- (Venezuela) Rodman Valera
