= CV Almería =

Spanish professional volleyball team

Unicaja Almería
- Full name: Club Voleibol Almería
- Founded: 1986
- Ground: Moisés Ruiz, Almería, Andalusia, Spain (Capacity: 1,750)
- Chairman: (Spain) Ramón Sedeño
- Manager: (Italy) Piero Molducci
- League: Superliga
- 2014–15: Superliga, 1st / W

Club Voleibol Almería, also known for sponsorship reasons as Unicaja Almería, is a professional volleyball team based in Almeria, Spain. It plays in the top flight of Spanish volleyball, Superliga.

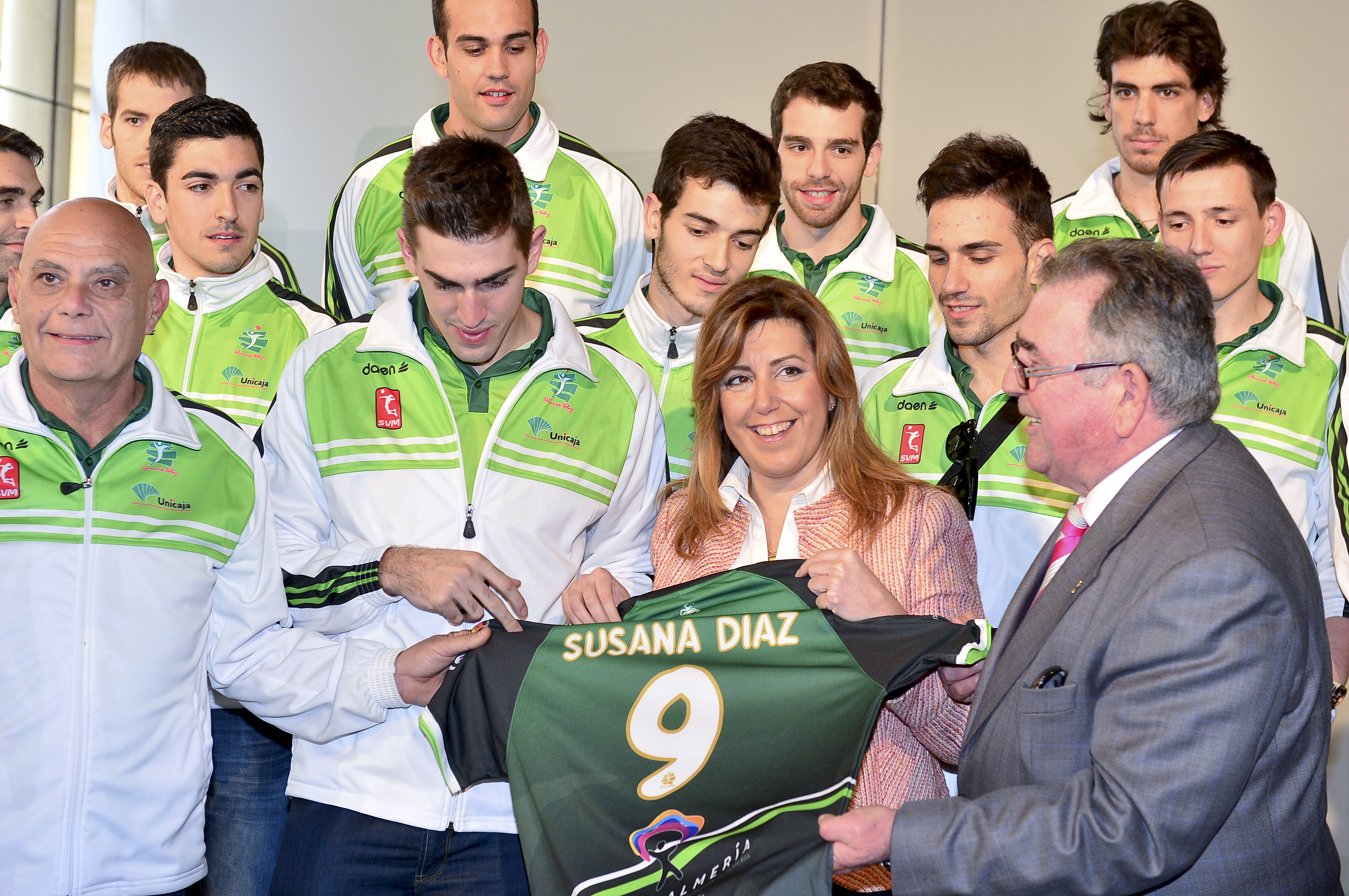

== Honors ==
- Superliga : 12
  - 1997, 1998, 2000, 2001, 2002, 2003, 2004, 2005, 2013, 2015, 2016, 2022
- Copa del Rey : 11
  - 1995, 1998, 1999, 2000, 2002, 2007, 2009, 2010, 2014, 2016, 2019
- Spain's supercup : 8
  - 1995, 2002, 2003, 2006, 2010, 2011, 2015, 2022

== 2013–14 season squad ==
| # | Name | DoB | Height | Nat. | Position |
|---|---|---|---|---|---|
| 2. | Guilherme Hage | October 28, 1988 (age 36) | 2.03 m (6 ft 8 in) | (Brazil) | Wing-spiker |
| 3. | Jesús Bruque | July 13, 1991 (age 33) | 1.88 m (6 ft 2 in) | (Spain) | Setter |
| 4. | Toni Llabrés | November 20, 1991 (age 33) | 1.90 m (6 ft 3 in) | (Spain) | Libero |
| 7. | Jorge Almansa | April 17, 1991 (age 33) | 1.95 m (6 ft 5 in) | (Spain) | Wing-spiker |
| 8. | Pablo Dus | September 19, 1990 (age 34) | 1.90 m (6 ft 3 in) | (Spain) | Setter |
| 9. | Pablo Bugallo | November 20, 1991 (age 33) | 1.95 m (6 ft 5 in) | (Spain) | Middle-blocker |
| 10. | Raúl Muñoz | March 6, 1991 (age 34) | 1.83 m (6 ft 0 in) | (Spain) | Wing-spiker |
| 11. | Caio de Prá | March 11, 1987 (age 38) | 2.03 m (6 ft 8 in) | (Brazil) | Opposite |
| 13. | Alejandro del Águila | June 10, 1994 (age 30) | 1.94 m (6 ft 4 in) | (Spain) | Middle-blocker |
| 16. | Diego Almeida | September 23, 1986 (age 38) | 2.03 m (6 ft 8 in) | (Brazil) | Middle-blocker |
| 17. | Carlos Felipe | April 3, 1995 (age 29) | 1.85 m (6 ft 1 in) | (Spain) | Wing-spiker |
| 18. | Daniel Rocamora | May 27, 1988 (age 36) | 2.03 m (6 ft 8 in) | (Spain) | Opposite |
