= Miguel Ángel De Amo =

Spanish volleyball and beach volleyball player

Miguel Ángel de Amo
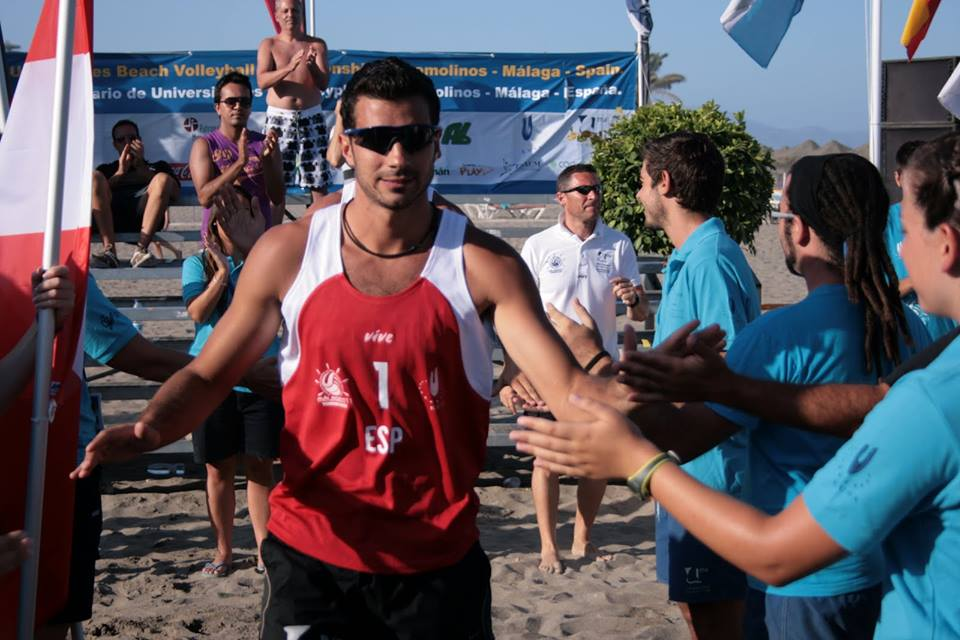
- De Amo in a tournament

Personal information
- Full name: Miguel Ángel de Amo Fernández-Echevarría
- Nickname: Io de Amo
- Nationality: Spanish
- Born: 16 September 1985 (age 41); Madrid, Spain
- Hometown: Málaga, Spain
- Height: 1.83 m (6 ft 0 in)
- Weight: 76 kg (168 lb)
- Spike: 325 cm (128 in)
- Block: 310 cm (122 in)

Beach volleyball information

Current teammate
Teammate
Ignacio Batallan

Best results
| Years | Result |
|---|---|
| 2004; 2008 | U21 World Champion; University World Champion |

Indoor volleyball information
- Position: Setter
- Current club: VK Jihostroj České Budějovice
- Number: 3

Career
| Years | Teams |
|---|---|
| 2002–2006; 2006–2009; 2009–2010; 2010–2011; 2011–2012; 2012–2013; 2013; 2014; 2014–2015; 2015 | PTV Málaga; Numancia CMA Soria; UMA Probisa Pizarra; FC Barcelona; Cajasol Séville; Nea Salamina Famagouste; CV Teruel; CV Andorra; ŠK Chemes Humenné; AZS Częstochowa; CV Almería |

National team
| 2010– | Spain |
- Last updated: 4 August 2016

Miguel Ángel de Amo Fernández-Echevarría (born 16 September 1985) is a Spanish player of volleyball and beach volleyball.

== Career ==
=== Volleyball Biography ===
De Amo started his career in Madrid, in the historical team of Salesianos de Atocha, where his father played. At the age of 15, he moved to Málaga, where he played in the PTV Málaga and became Spanish Junior Champion in 2004. De Amo was also captain of the Spain men's national junior volleyball team (15 selections). With the CD Numancia, he took a silver medal in the Spanish Supercup volleyball competition and a third position in the Spain Volleyball Championships (2008-2009).

From FC Barcelone the season 2009-2010, he moved in 2010 to the Cajasol Sevilla. During that year he played with the Spain men's national volleyball team (19 selections) in the Men's European Volleyball Championship, and came second.

During the season 2011-2012, he played in Cyprus with the Nea Salamis Famagusta Volleyball Club. One year later (2012-2013), Miguel Ángel joined the CV Teruel and won the Spain King's Cup, the Spanish Supercup volleyball tournament and the Spain Volleyball Championships(SVM).

In September 2013, he started the season with CV Andorra where he won the Cataluña Volleyball Cup, but from January 2014 played with the VK Chemes Humenné in Slovakia, where he won the Slovak Cup and the Slovakia Men's Volleyball League.

In September 2014, he played in the Polish team of AZS Częstochowa., then next season he started with the Spanish CV Almería team, 10 times winner of the Spain Volleyball Championships(SVM). For the first match of the season, they become Andalusia's champions, and this season, they got the Historical "Triplet" winning the Spanish Supercup volleyball tournament, the Spain King's Cup and the Spain Volleyball Championships.

=== Teams ===
Teams
| Team | From | To |
|---|---|---|
| (Spain) PTV Málaga | | |
| (Spain) Numancia CMA Soria | 2002 | 2006 |
| (Spain) UMA Probisa Pizarra | 2006 | 2009 |
| (Spain) FC Barcelone | 2009 | 2010 |
| (Spain) Cajasol Séville | 2010 | 2011 |
| (Cyprus) Nea Salamina Famagouste | 2011 | 2012 |
| (Spain) CV Teruel | 2012 | 2013 |
| CV Andorra | 09/2013 | 12/2013 |
| (Slovakia) ŠK Chemes Humenné | 01/2014 | 05/2014 |
| (Poland) AZS Częstochowa | 2014 | 2015 |
| (Spain) CV Almería | 2015 | |

=== Honours and awards ===
- 2013
  - (silver) : Spain Volleyball Championships
  - (gold) : Spanish Supercup volleyball tournament
  - (gold) : Spain King's Cup
- 2014
  - (gold) : Catalonia Volleyball Cup
  - (gold) : Slovak Cup
  - (gold) : Slovakia Men's Volleyball League
- 2015
  - (gold) : Andalusia Volleyball Cup
  - (gold) : Spanish Supercup volleyball tournament
  - (gold) : Spain King's Cup
  - (gold) : Spain Volleyball Championships

=== Beach volleyball biography ===
In 2002, De Amo was U18 European Championship runner-up in Illitchivsk (Ukraine) and fifth at the youth World Cup in Xylokastro (Greece), with Javier Alcaraz. At the Junior FIVB Beach Volleyball World Championships in Saint-Quay-Portrieux (France), in 2003, with Germán López, he finished ninth and was U20 European championship runner-up in Salzburg (Austria).

Next year, in 2004, he became U21 World Champion with Inocencio Lario in Porto Santo(Portugal), and fifth at the U21 European championship in Koper (Slovenia). In 2005 he played with Lario in Zagreb (Croatia) at the first FIVB Beach Volleyball World Championships. The same year, he finished in the 19th position with Adrián Gavira at the Junior FIVB Beach Volleyball World Championships at Rio de Janeiro (Brazil), and came fourth at the U21 European championship, with

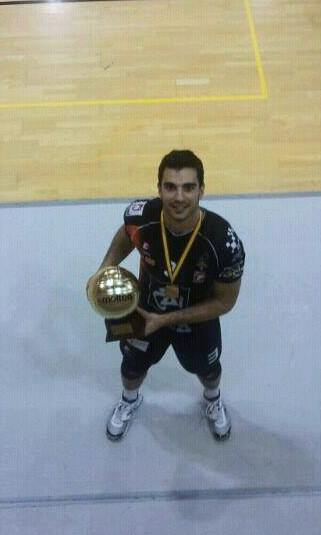
Miguel Ángel de Amo with CV Teruel.

Lario, at Mysłowice(Poland). In 2008, he played for the first time with José Manuel (Chema) Ariza at the Mallorca Open (Spain) and became University World Champion in Hamburg (Germany). In 2009 de Amo / Ariza won the silver medal at the Mediterranean Games in Pescara (Italy). In 2013 de Amo and Lario together again, played their first Grand Slam in Shanghai (China). Lario and de Amo classified for the Beach Volleyball World Championships in Stare Jabłonki (Poland).

Since summer 2013, in partnership with Ignacio Batallán, in the Batallán-De Amo voleyplaya team, he has competed in the Madison Beachvolley Tour, where they won the Cambrils tournament, and achieved the silver medal in all the other tournaments to become Spanish Championship runner up at the Reserva de Higuerón (Fuengirola).

In summer 2014, he achieved first place with Ignacio Batallán in the I Internacionales Ciudad de Ibiza, the II Internacionales Villa de Laredo and the I Internacionales de Tarragona. They were also Madison Beach Volley Tour Champions and bronze medallists in the Spanish Championship at Fuengirola.

In July 2015, he won the III Internacionales Villa de Laredo with his partner Ignacio Batallán. He also won the Trust Kapital OPEN in Kuopio (Finland) and then in August he became Spanish Championship runner up at the Reserva de Higuerón (Fuengirola).

=== Beach Volleyball ===
==== Teammates ====
Teammates
| Date | Teammate | |
|---|---|---|
| 2002 | Javier Alcaraz | |
| 2003 | German Lopez | |
| 2004 | Inocencio Lario | Javier Alcaraz |
| 2005 | Inocencio Lario | Adrián Gavira |
| 2006 | Inocencio Lario | Valentin Sollet |
| 2007 | Jose Manuel Ariza | |
| 2008 | Jose Manuel Ariza | |
| 2009 | Jose Manuel Ariza | |
| 2013 | Inocencio Lario | Ignacio Batallan |
| 2014 | Ignacio Batallan | |
| 2015 | Ignacio Batallan | |

==== Honours and awards ====
- 2002 :
  - (silver) U18 European Championship
- 2003 :
  - (silver) U20 European championship
- 2004 :
  - (gold) U21 World Championship
- 2007 :
  - (bronze) European Universities Beach Volleyball Championships
- 2008 :
  - (gold) University World Championship
- 2009 :
  - (silver) Mediterranean Games
  - (silver) Spanish Championship
  - (bronze) European Universities Beach Volleyball Championships
- 2012 :
  - (bronze) European Universities Beach Volleyball Championships
- 2013 :
  - (silver) I Internacionales Ciudad de Valladolid Madison Beach Volley Tour
  - (gold) I Internacionales Ciudad de Cambrils Madison Beach Volley Tour
  - (silver) I Internacionales Villa de Laredo Madison Beach Volley Tour
  - (silver) I Internacionales Santanyí Cala d’Or Madison Beach Volley Tour
  - (silver) Spanish Championship
  - (gold) Madison Beach Volley Tour
- 2014 :
  - (gold) I Internacionales de Ibiza Madison Beach Volley Tour
  - (gold) II Internacionales Villa de Laredo Madison Beach Volley Tour
  - (bronze) Spanish Championship
  - (gold) Madison Beach Volley Tour
- 2015 :
  - (bronze) I Internacionales Ciudad de Valencia Madison Beach Volley Tour
  - (gold) III Internacionales Villa de Laredo Madison Beach Volley Tour
  - (gold) Trust Kapital OPEN, Kuopio, Finland.
  - (silver) Spanish Championship
