= VK Mirad UNIPO Prešov =

Slovak volleyball club

VK MIRAD UNIPO Prešov
- Short name: VK Prešov
- Founded: 1930s (as TJ Vukov Prešov)
- Ground: Športová hala, Prešov
- League: Slovak Men's Volleyball League
- Website: Club home page

VK MIRAD UNIPO Prešov is a volleyball club in Slovakia. The club currently competes in the Slovak Men's Volleyball League, the highest domestic league in the country. Founded as TJ Vukov Prešov in the 1930s, VK Prešov changed their name to MIRAD UNIPO Prešov for the 2020/2021 season. Their name changed due to having an affiliation with the Prešov University UNIPO.

VK Prešov are a 2-time champion of Slovakia and a 5-time winner of the Slovak Cup. They are considered one of the most successful volleyball clubs in Slovakia.

== History ==
=== 1930s: Early years ===
The origins of men's volleyball in Prešov date back to the 1930s, when the first volleyball teams were formed within TJ Sokol and in high schools. Since 1949, Prešov teams under various names (Sokol Sparta Dukla Prešov, KNV Prešov, TJ Slávia Prešov, TJ ZVL Prešov, TJ Tatran Prešov) have participated in regional championships and the 2nd Slovak National League. In 1986, three teams from Prešov participated in the regional championship: TJ Tatran Prešov, TJ ZVL Prešov, and TJ Vukov Prešov. The city authorities decided that TJ Vukov Prešov would be the main club representing Prešov. In the 1986/1987 season, the team won the regional championship and was promoted to the Slovak First League, which, after the dissolution of Czechoslovakia, became the highest league in the independent Slovakia.

=== 2004–2005: Most successful season ===
In the 2004/2005 season, the volleyball players of VK Prešov wrote themselves into the history of Prešov volleyball becoming the champions of Slovakia for the first time and also won the Slovak volleyball Cup. In January 2005, the players of coach Jaroslav Vlk achieved their first historic success, they became the winners of the Slovak Cup, winning over Púchov 3–2 in the final. In April 2005, they won over VKP Bratislava 4–2 on aggregate. In the league and play-off parts of the first league, they played 28 matches, won 24 matches, lost twice to VKP Bratislava and twice to Zvolen.

=== 2007–2012: Re-establishment of Prešov ===
Following the 2007/2008 season, the Prešov club was expelled from the Extraliga due to financial problems. In 2008, the Slavia VK PU Prešov association was formed, uniting players from VK PU Prešov and TJ Slavia PU Prešov. In the 2008/2009 season, the men's team, led by coach Petr Váhovský, finished first in the Eastern First League and, after a one-season break, returned to the Extraliga. In the 2009/2010 season, Ľuboslav Šalata became the coach. That season, the Prešov team reached the Extraliga final, losing to VK Chemes Humenné. Before the end of the 2009/2010 season, Mirad became the club's title sponsor. In the 2010/2011 season the team played under the name Slávia VK PU Mirad Prešov, and from the 2011/2012 season – VK MIRAD PU Prešov.

=== 2014–2015: Second title ===
After beating VK Chemes Humenné, the volleyball players of Prešov became the first team since the 2006/2007 season to go through the league phase of the Slovak Men's Volleyball League without a loss. The team of won all 18 matches and won the league phase with 51 points. VK Mirad would eventually win the final round, beating Spartak VKP Komárno 4–0 in the final set, winning their second title after 10 years.

=== 2015–present: Success in the cup ===
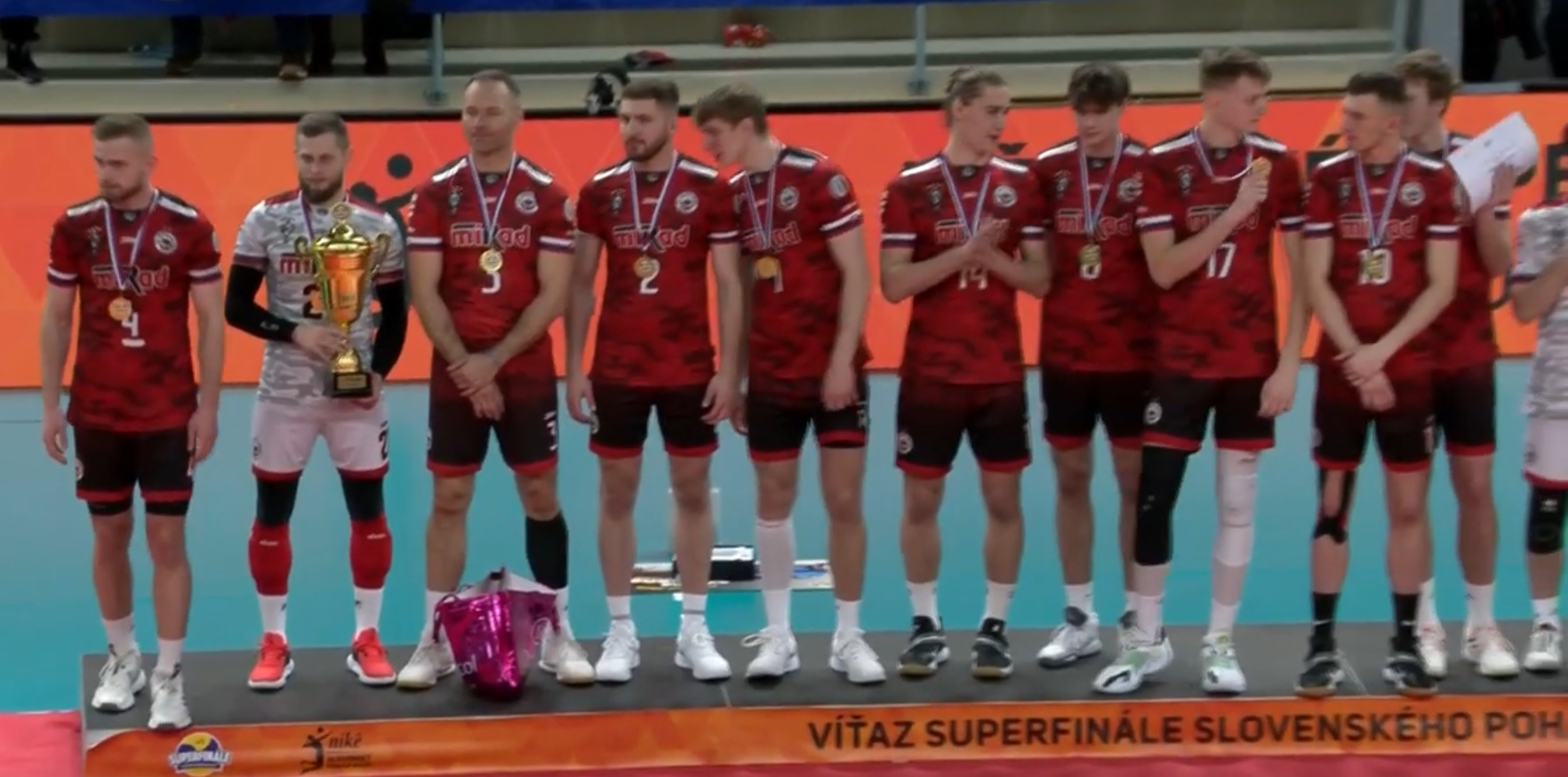
Prešov players celebrating their win in the final of the 2022–23 Slovak Cup.

In the 2015–16 CEV Cup, Prešov advanced to the 8th finals, the farthest the club has ever advanced to in the competition. In that round, they would get knocked out by Umbria Volley Perugia. In 2016, Prešov would lose in the final of the League playoffs on aggregate against Nitra. That same year, VK Prešov would win their second cup after 11 years, beating title rivals Nitra in the final series, turning the game around after losing 2–0. In 2017, VK Prešov won the Slovak Cup for the third time in their history, once again beating Nitra 3–1 on aggregate in the final. The club would win the cup two more times in the following years, beating Svidník in 2021, and Rieker UJS Komárno in 2023. Prešov would beat Estonian club Tartu Volleyball 3–2 in the first leg of the 2022–23 CEV Challenge Cup 16th finals. The win was considered a shock result. Despite the win, the team from Prešov would lose the second leg 3–0.

== Ground ==
VK Prešov currently plays their games in the Športová hala, located in Prešov. The building is intended mainly for indoor sports such as volleyball, basketball, handball. It has four changing rooms with showers and toilets. There is also a grandstand for spectators.

== Honors ==
=== Domestic ===
- Slovak Men's Volleyball League
  - Winners (2): 2005, 2015
  - Runners-up (4): 2010, 2016, 2022, 2023
  - 3rd place (3): 2004, 2017, 2021
- Slovak Men’s Volleyball Cup
  - Winners (5): 2005, 2016, 2017, 2021, 2023
- Mirad Cup
  - Winners (1): 2016
