= Prievidza =

City in Slovakia

- City
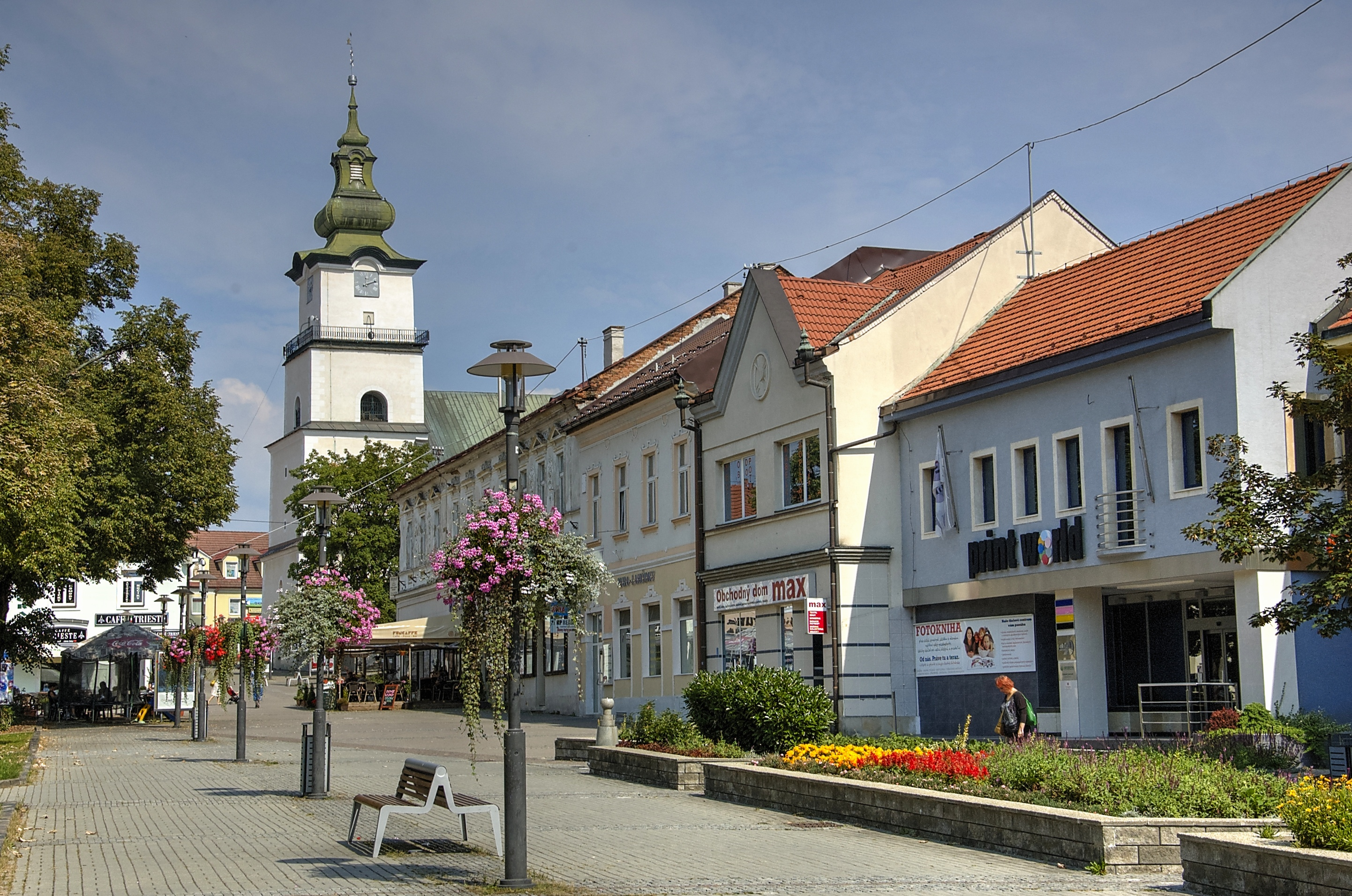
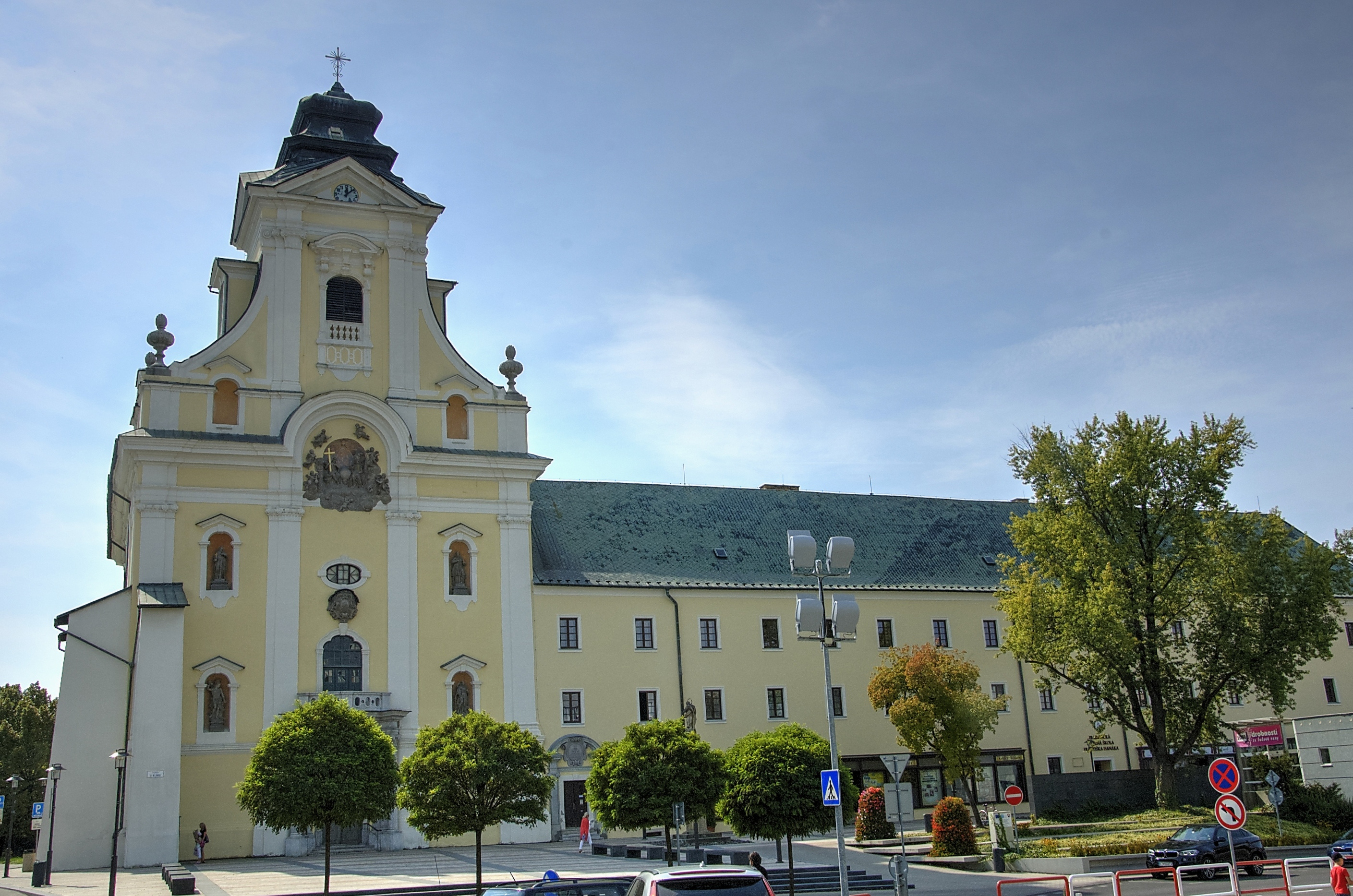
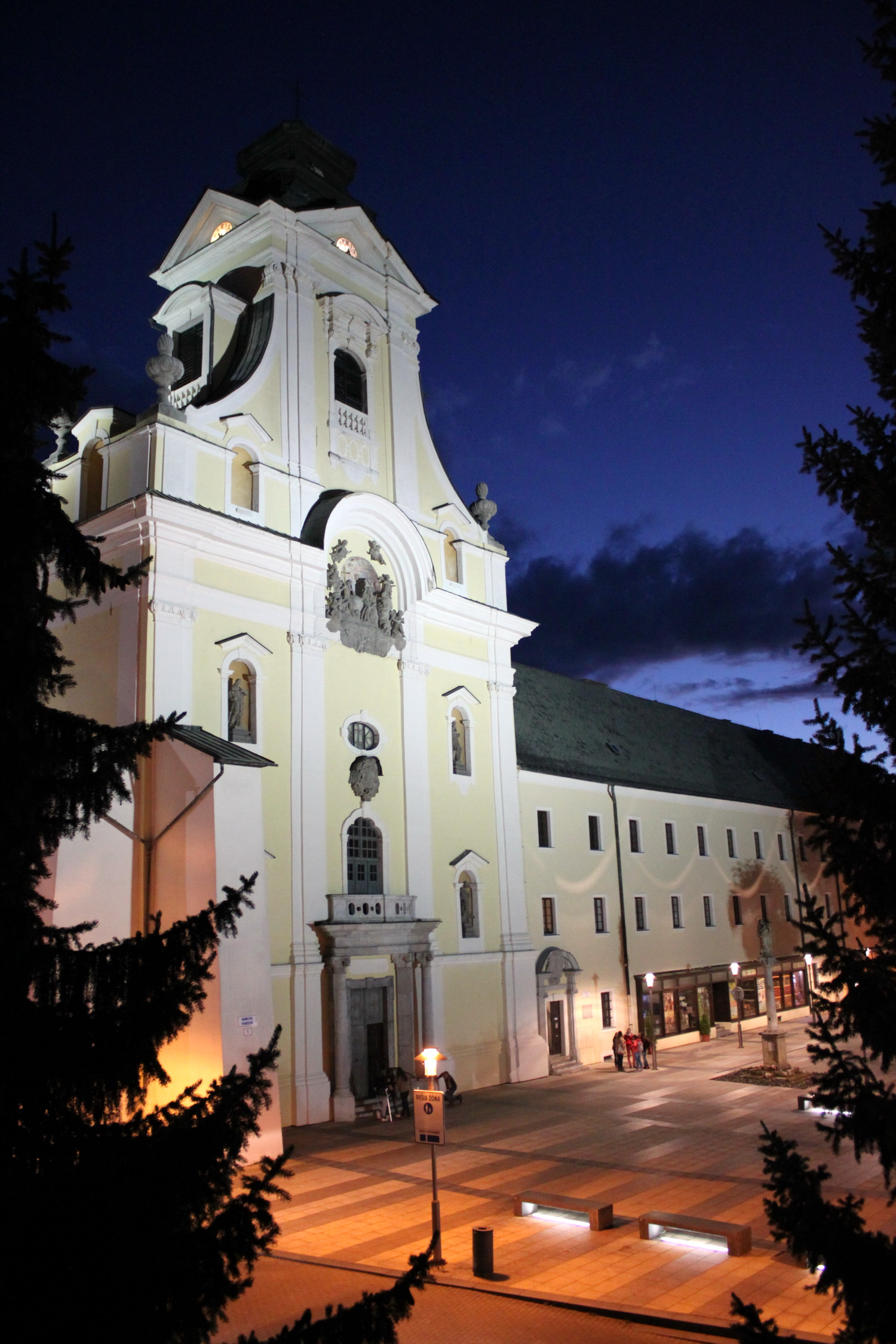
- Above: City centre with Saint Bartholomew church Below: Holy Trinity Church situated at Piarist square

- Flag Coat of arms

- Location in Slovakia Prievidza (Slovakia)
- Coordinates: 48°46′16″N 18°37′18″E
- Country: Slovakia
- Region: Trenčín
- District: Prievidza
- First mentioned: 1113

Government
  - Mayor: Katarína Macháčková

Area
  - Total: 43.06 km^{2} (16.63 sq mi)
- (2022)
- Elevation: 309 m (1,014 ft)

Population (2025)
  - Total: 41,959
- Time zone: UTC+1 (CET)
  - Summer (DST): UTC+2 (CEST)
- Postal code: 971 01
- Area code: +421 46
- Vehicle registration plate (until 2022): PD
- Website: www.prievidza.sk

Prievidza (Slovak pronunciation: [ˈprɪeʋidza]; Hungarian: Privigye, German: Priwitz) is a city in western Slovakia. With approximately 42,000 inhabitants it is the second biggest municipality in the Trenčín Region and 11th largest city in Slovakia generally.

== Name ==
The name is probably derived from a personal name Previd with possessive suffix -ja, signifying 'Previd's village'. An alternative and less probable derivation is from the word element, vid- (as in vidieť, 'to see'), so, previdieť, 'to see through', thus 'the village which can be seen from all directions', or 'the village in the thin stand'.

== History ==
=== Oldest settlement ===
The Upper Nitra Basin was inhabited as early as the middle of the Paleolithic period, as evidenced by the rich paleontological findings in Bojnice and Prievidza. Thousands of artifacts have been discovered, including stone tools, animal bone fossils and fireplace remnants.

=== Middle Ages and early modern period ===
The first written mention of Prievidza was in 1113, as Preuigan. It was promoted to a royal free town in 1383, on 26 January. This meant that the town obtained privileges such as paying benefits to hold markets, choice of pastor and mayor, building mills, catching fish, the free development of crafts and sale of produce. From the 16th to the first third of the 17th century, the Thurzó family controlled the town. Ottomans approached Prievidza from the south and burned it in 1599, along with other towns in the upper Nitra river valley. In 1666, the Piarists built the baroque church (now known as the Piarist Church) and Monastery, which became a centre of culture and education. During the Kuruc uprising in 1673, Prievidza was burned down again, with fire burning a part of town's archives. In 1870, it had 2,719 inhabitants.

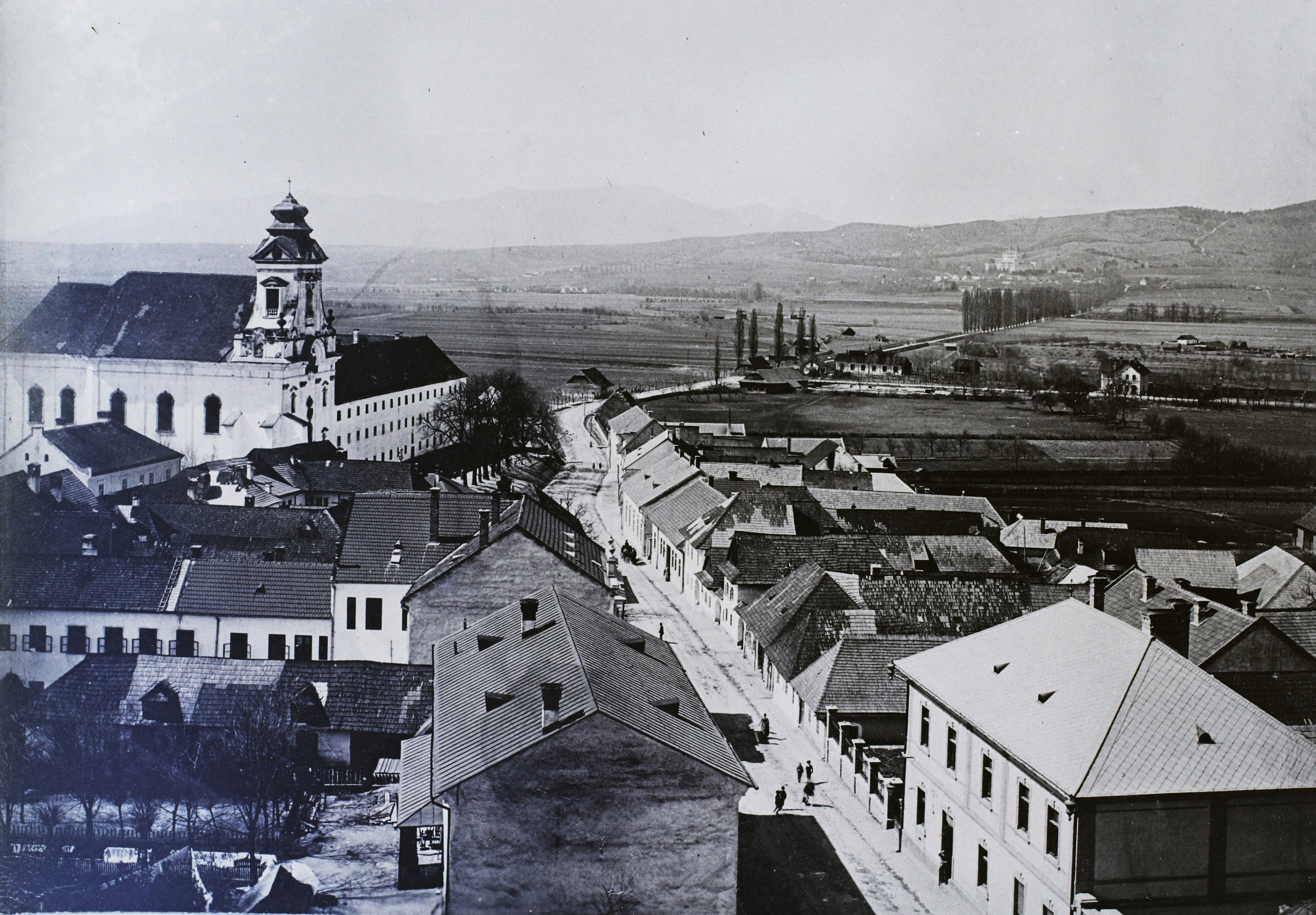
View of Prievidza from 1906

=== 19th and 20th centuries ===
Since the end of the 19th century and the beginning of the 20th century, industry started to grow, as the railways to Prievidza were constructed. During World War II, the city was one of the centres of partisans. On 4 April 1945, Prievidza was captured by troops of the Soviet 40th Army. Since the end of the war, the population has grown enormously from 5,000 inhabitants to around 53,000 inhabitants, as industry grew. Prievidza became the home of many miners and workers that found employment in the coal mines located in nearby village Cigeľ and towns Handlová and Nováky.

== Geography ==
The municipality lies at an altitude of 309 metres (1,014 ft) and covers an area of 43.06 km^{2} (16.63 sq mi) (2025). The city is near the smaller town of Bojnice, sharing a public transport system. The valley of the Nitra River, in which the city lies, is surrounded by mountain ranges on all sides, in the west Strážov Mountains, in the north Malá Fatra, in the east Žiar and in the south Vtáčnik. Prievidza is the eleventh largest city in Slovakia. It is located around 60 kilometres (37 mi) south of Žilina, 69 kilometres (43 mi) east of the regional capital Trenčín and 158 kilometres (98 mi) from capital city of Slovakia Bratislava (by road).

== Climate ==
Prievidza lies in the north temperate zone and has a continental climate with four distinct seasons. It is characterized by a significant variation between hot summers and cold, snowy winters. On 21 July 2022, a maximum temperature of 38.6 °C (101.5 °F) was registered in Prievidza.

Climate data for Prievidza (1991−2020)
Month	Jan	Feb	Mar	Apr	May	Jun	Jul	Aug	Sep	Oct	Nov	Dec	Year
Record high °C (°F)	14.6 (58.3)	18.0 (64.4)	23.9 (75.0)	30.4 (86.7)	32.0 (89.6)	34.6 (94.3)	38.6 (101.5)	38.2 (100.8)	33.4 (92.1)	28.0 (82.4)	23.9 (75.0)	15.9 (60.6)	38.6 (101.5)
Mean daily maximum °C (°F)	2.6 (36.7)	5.2 (41.4)	10.2 (50.4)	17.0 (62.6)	21.4 (70.5)	25.0 (77.0)	27.3 (81.1)	27.1 (80.8)	21.4 (70.5)	15.5 (59.9)	9.1 (48.4)	3.3 (37.9)	15.4 (59.7)
Daily mean °C (°F)	−1.1 (30.0)	0.6 (33.1)	4.7 (40.5)	10.6 (51.1)	15.2 (59.4)	18.8 (65.8)	20.4 (68.7)	20.0 (68.0)	14.8 (58.6)	9.8 (49.6)	5.3 (41.5)	0.2 (32.4)	9.9 (49.8)
Mean daily minimum °C (°F)	−4.6 (23.7)	−3.5 (25.7)	0.0 (32.0)	4.3 (39.7)	8.7 (47.7)	12.4 (54.3)	13.9 (57.0)	13.5 (56.3)	9.5 (49.1)	5.3 (41.5)	1.9 (35.4)	−2.9 (26.8)	4.9 (40.8)
Record low °C (°F)	−23.8 (−10.8)	−22.0 (−7.6)	−19.4 (−2.9)	−7.3 (18.9)	−3.7 (25.3)	2.2 (36.0)	4.0 (39.2)	3.6 (38.5)	−1.3 (29.7)	−8.9 (16.0)	−16.2 (2.8)	−24.0 (−11.2)	−24.0 (−11.2)
Average precipitation mm (inches)	46.1 (1.81)	41.0 (1.61)	41.3 (1.63)	40.3 (1.59)	65.9 (2.59)	78.7 (3.10)	84.0 (3.31)	68.4 (2.69)	59.2 (2.33)	58.1 (2.29)	49.9 (1.96)	45.8 (1.80)	678.7 (26.72)
Average precipitation days (≥ 1.0 mm)	8.3	7.4	7.4	6.7	9.7	9.5	9.5	7.9	7.6	8.3	8.2	8.4	99.0
Average snowy days	13.0	10.0	6.1	1.7	0.0	0.0	0.0	0.0	0.0	0.5	4.5	10.1	45.9
Average relative humidity (%)	81.6	76.9	70.5	63.3	66.3	65.0	67.0	68.8	73.7	78.2	79.1	82.9	72.8
Mean monthly sunshine hours	65.2	91.7	141.8	195.9	234.3	244.8	260.2	253.9	173.4	126.5	64.9	52.7	1,905.3
Source 1: NOAA
Source 2: OGIMET (July record high)

== Population ==
Historical population
Year	Pop.	±%
1970	28,425	—
1980	40,813	+43.6%
1991	53,424	+30.9%
2001	53,097	−0.6%
2011	48,978	−7.8%
2021	45,017	−8.1%
Source: Censuses

Population statistic (10 years)
Year	1995	2005	2015	2025
Count	54,405	51,412	47,143	41,959
Difference		−5.50%	−8.30%	−10.99%

Population statistic
Year	2024	2025
Count	42,429	41,959
Difference		−1.10%

It has a population of 41,959 people (31 December 2025).

=== Ethnicity ===
Census 2021 (1+ %)
Ethnicity	Number	Fraction
Slovak	40,614	90.21%
Not found out	3952	8.77%
Total	45,017	

In year 2021 was 45,017 people by ethnicity 40,614 as Slovak, 3952 as Not found out, 420 as Czech, 177 as Hungarian, 167 as Other, 141 as Romani, 101 as German, 88 as Russian, 37 as Rusyn, 35 as Ukrainian, 35 as Polish, 34 as Vietnamese, 22 as Italian, 19 as Serbian, 18 as Chinese, 17 as Romanian, 17 as Croatian, 16 as English, 15 as Bulgarian, 14 as Moravian, 12 as Irish, 9 as Albanian, 8 as Jewish, 6 as Greek, 5 as Austrian, 4 as Turkish, 3 as Silesian, 3 as French, 1 as Korean and 1 as Canadian.

Note on population: The difference values of population numbers in the table "Population statistic" and in the sections "Ethnicity" & "Religion" is caused by the use of various statistical methods.

=== Religion ===
Census 2021 (1+ %)
Religion	Number	Fraction
Roman Catholic Church	19,159	42.56%
None	19,119	42.47%
Not found out	4379	9.73%
Evangelical Church	742	1.65%
Total	45,017	

In year 2021 was 45,017 people by religion 19,159 from Roman Catholic Church, 19,119 from None, 4379 from Not found out, 742 from Evangelical Church, 280 from Christian Congregations in Slovakia, 266 from Greek Catholic Church, 193 from Ad hoc movements, 191 from Jehovah's Witnesses, 188 from Other, 92 from Buddhism, 89 from Other and not ascertained christian church, 74 from Eastern Orthodox Church, 63 from Calvinist Church, 45 from Paganism and natural spirituality, 30 from Islam, 19 from Old Catholic Church, 19 from Hinduism, 16 from United Methodist Church, 16 from Seventh-day Adventist Church, 11 from Apostolic Church, 7 from Czechoslovak Hussite Church, 6 from Jewish community, 5 from Church of the Brethren, 4 from Baptists Church, 2 from Church of Jesus Christ of Latter-day Saints and 2 from Bahá'i Community.

== Sport ==
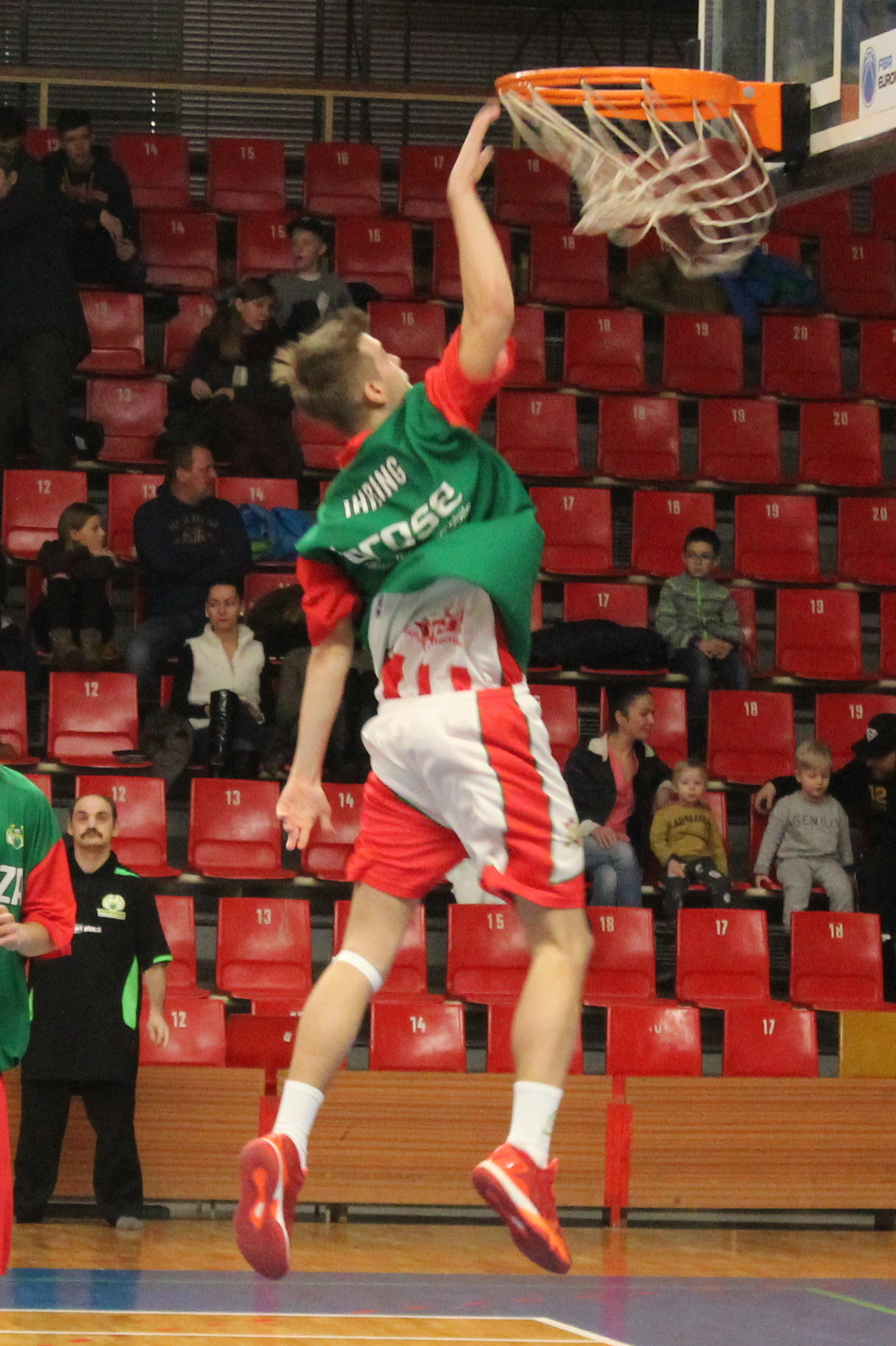
Basketball is the most popular sport in the city.

Basketball is the most popular and successful sport in the city. Basketball club BC Prievidza won two titles in the former men's top Czechoslovak Basketball League (1989, 1993), and, after the dissolution of Czechoslovakia, four titles in the men's top Slovak Basketball League (1994, 1995, 2012, 2016). Volleyball club VK Prievidza won two titles (2018, 2019) in the top Slovakia Men's Volleyball League. Football has an over 100 years long tradition in the city.

Footballers such as Martin Škrtel, Juraj Kucka, Patrik Hrošovský and Dávid Hancko were raised in local football club Baník.

From Prievidza are also ice hockey players including Andrej Sekera and Martin Štajnoch.

=== Sports teams in Prievidza ===
- Basketball – BC Prievidza – Men Top Slovak league
- Volleyball – VK Prievidza – Men Top Slovak league
- Ice hockey – HC Prievidza – 3rd Men Slovak league
- Football – FC Baník Prievidza – 3rd Men Slovak league

=== Arenas and stadiums ===
- Niké Aréna (3,400 seats) tenants – BC Prievidza, VK Prievidza
- Futbalový štadión Prievidza (7,500/2,500 for sitting) tenants – FC Baník Prievidza
- Zimný štadión Prievidza (2,788 seats) tenants – HC Prievidza

== Twin towns – sister cities ==
Prievidza is twinned with:

- Ibbenbüren, Germany
- Šumperk, Czech Republic
- Luserna San Giovanni, Italy
- Valjevo, Serbia
- Velenje, Slovenia
- Jastrzębie-Zdrój, Poland
- Novomoskovsk, Russia

== See also ==
- St. Andrew's chapel in Kos
