= Ignacio Batallan =

Spanish beach volleyball player

Ignacio Batallán
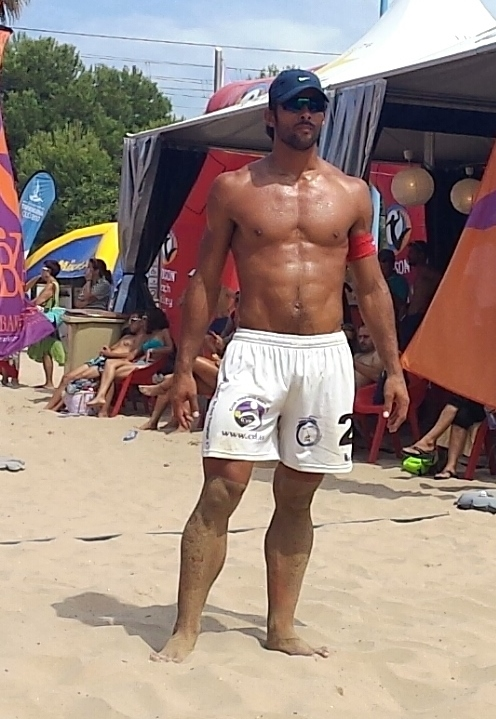
- Ignacio Batallán

Personal information
- Full name: Segundo Ignacio Batallán
- Nickname: Hercules
- Nationality: Spanish-Argentine
- Born: 29 April 1984 (age 42); Catamarca, Argentina
- Hometown: Málaga, Spain
- Height: 1.93 m (6 ft 4 in)
- Weight: 97 kg (214 lb)
- Spike: 330 cm (130 in)
- Block: 247 cm (97 in)

Beach volleyball information

Current teammate
Teammate
Miguel Ángel De Amo

Indoor volleyball information
- Current team: Club Voleibol Fuengirola (Spain)
- Last updated: 21 January 2015

Segundo Ignacio Batallán (born 29 April 1984, in Catamarca) is a Hispano-Argentinean volleyball and beach volleyball player. He is 1.93 m tall and an opposite. He is also well known for his unconventional body which earned him the nickname of Hercules and enabled him to work as a model.

== Career ==
=== Volleyball ===
==== Teams ====
Clubs
Team	From	To
(Argentina) National University of Catamarca		
(Argentina) Asociación Bancaria		
(Argentina) Club Municipalidad de Córdoba		
(Argentina) Club Social y Deportivo La Calera		
(Argentina) General Paz Juniors Volleyball		
(Spain) AD Voleibol Almendralejo	2008	2009
(Spain) AD Voleibol Almendralejo	2009	2010
(Spain) Multicaja Fabregas Sport	2010	2011
(Spain) Multicaja Fabregas Sport	2011	2012
(Spain) Club Voleibol Fuengirola	2013	2014

==== Career ====
Nacho started his career in Catamarca (Argentina) in the National University of Catamarca team, then he moved to Asociación Bancaria.

When he went to study in Cordoba, he played in the Club Municipalidad de Córdoba, in the Social y Deportivo La Calera club, and in the General Paz Juniors Volleyball, with which he played the Argentinean League A2 Level season 2004–2005.

The 2008–2009 season, he moved to Spain, where he played in the AD Voleibol Almendralejo team, and passed to the upper category, the Men's Liga FEV, being the absolute champion of the first division, with 22 wins and no losses.

In 2010 he stayed in the same team and then went to the Spain Volleyball Championships 2.

The 2010–2011 season, he played in the Multicaja Fabregas Sport, Zarragoza club, which finished the 2010–2011 season in 9th place of the Championships, and 2011–2012 season in 6th. Nacho has been in the top 10 best scorers of the Spain Volleyball Championships for seven days.

Since September 2013, he has trained the Club Voleibol Fuengirola teams. Nacho has represented the Club Voleibol Fuengirola as a player and he is also the president. In June 2014, he received the award for the best sportsman of 2013 from the city of Fuengirola.

=== Beach volleyball ===
==== Teammates ====
Teammates
Date	Teammate
2008	Gabriel Fernandez
2011	Rafael Gárzon
2013-2015	Miguel Ángel De Amo
2016	Juan Escalona

==== Honours and awards ====
- 2011 : 9th satellite event of CEV in Vaduz
- 2013 : (silver) I Internacionales Ciudad de Valladolid, Madison Beach Volley Tour
- 2013 : (gold) I Internacionales Ciudad de Cambrils, Madison Beach Volley Tour
- 2013 : (silver) I Internacionales Villa de Laredo, Madison Beach Volley Tour
- 2013 : (silver) I Internacionales de Santanyi Cala D'or, Madison Beach Volley Tour
- 2013 : (silver) Spanish Championship
- 2013 : (gold) Madison Beach Volley Tour
- 2014 : (gold) I Internacionales de Ibiza, Madison Beach Volley Tour
- 2014 : (gold) II Internacionales Villa de Laredo, Madison Beach Volley Tour
- 2014 : (gold) I Internacionales de Tarragona, Madison Beach Volley Tour
- 2014 : (gold) Madison Beach Volley Tour
- 2014 : (bronze) Spanish Championship
- 2015 : (gold) III Internacionales Villa de Laredo Madison Beach Volley Tour
- 2015 : (gold) Trust Kapital OPEN, Kuopio, Finland.
- 2015 : (silver) Spanish Championship

==== Career ====
Nacho played the Barcelona FIVB Beach Volleyball World Tour, with Rafael Gárzon. They finished in 57th position. In 2011, he played with Gabriel FernÁndez the Brasilia FIVB Beach Volleyball World Tour, where they finished in the same position and the satellite event of Vaduz (Liechtenstein )European Beach Volleyball Championships where they finished ninth.

In 2013 he teams up with Miguel Ángel De Amo in the Batallán-De Amo team, with whom he played the Madison Beach Volley Tour. They were finalists in the first Internacionales Ciudad de Valladolid, they won the I Internacionales Ciudad de Cambrils and they were finalists in the I Internacionales Villa de Laredo and I Internacionales de Santanyi Cala D'or. They ended up being the subchampions of Spain in Reserva del Higuerón (Fuengirola).

In 2013, he and Miguel Ángel De Amo were placed second in the Spanish beach volleyball championship.

In summer 2014, he finished first along with Miguel Ángel De Amo in the following Internacionales: Ciudad de Ibiza, Villa de Laredo and Tarragona. They were also Madison Beach Volley Tour Champions and bronze medallists in the Spanish Championship in Fuengirola.

In July 2015, he won the III Internacionales Villa de Laredo with his partner Miguel Ángel de Amo, he also win the Trust Kapital OPEN in Kuopio (Finland) and then in August he becomes Spanish Championship runner up at the Reserva de Higuerón (Fuengirola).
