= Emanuel Kohút =

Slovak volleyball player

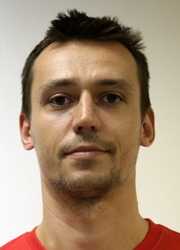

Personal information
- Nationality: (Slovakia) Slovak
- Born: 21 July 1982 (age 44); Bratislava, Slovakia
- Height: 2.04 m (6 ft 8 in)
- Weight: 101 kg (223 lb)
- Spike: 350 cm (138 in)

Volleyball information
- Position: Middle blocker
- Current club: (Slovakia) Spartak UJS Komarno

Career
| Years | Teams |
|---|---|
| 2003–2007; 2007–2008; 2008–2010; 2010–2011; 2011–2012; 2012–2014; 2014–2016; 2016–2017; 2017–2021; 2021– | (Slovakia) VKP Bratislava (Germany) Generali Unterhaching (Italy) Volley Treviso (Italy) Andreoli Latina (Italy) Volley Treviso (Italy) Piemonte Volley (Italy) Volley Piacenza (Poland) Czarni Radom (Poland) GKS Katowice (Slovakia) Spartak UJS Komarno |

National team
| Slovakia |
Honours
Men's volleyball
Representing Slovakia
European League
| Gold medal – first place | 2008 Turkey |
| Gold medal – first place | 2011 Slovakia |
| Bronze medal – third place | 2007 Portugal |

Emanuel Kohút (born 21 July 1982) is a Slovak volleyball player, former member of the Slovakia men's national volleyball team. On club level, he plays for Slovak team Spartak UJS Komarno.

== Sporting achievements ==
=== Clubs ===
- CEV Champions League
  - 2012/2013 – with Bre Banca Lannutti Cuneo
- National championships
  - 2003/2004 Slovak Cup, with VKP Bratislava
  - 2003/2004 Slovak Championship, with VKP Bratislava
  - 2005/2006 Slovak Championship, with VKP Bratislava
  - 2006/2007 Slovak Cup, with VKP Bratislava

=== Individual awards ===
- 2007: European League – Best Blocker
- 2017: Best Volleyball Player in Slovakia
