= VK Chemes Humenné =

Slovak volleyball club

- Full name: Športový klub Chemes Humenné
- Nickname: Chemesáci
- Founded: 12 June 1996; 29 years ago as VK Linda Chemes Humenné
- Dissolved: 14 December 2014 (turned into ŠK Chemes Spišská Nová Ves)
- Ground: Mestská Športová Hala, Humenné (Capacity: 1,180)
- Owner: Ján Molnár
- Chairman: Ján Grosiar
- League: Extraliga
- 2014–15 (last season): 2nd
- Website: Club home page

VK Chemes Humenné was a volleyball club based in the city of Humenné, Slovakia, which played in the Slovak Extraliga until the 2014–2015 season [sk]. Founded as VK Linda Chemes Humenne in 1996, the club changed its name to Chemes Humenne in 2002. Chemes is the second most successful volleyball team in Slovakia after VKP Bratislava.

Between the years 2007 to 2015, volleyball had been the biggest sport in Humenné. Chemes had been successful both in the senior field and in its work with youth. During those years, the club had achieved its highest success, winning the Slovak Men's Volleyball League 4 times. In the late months of 2014, the main sponsor cut its ties with Humenné, resulting in the club not participating in the first division. The club later relocated to Spišská Nová Ves and got renamed to ŠK Chemes Spišská Nová Ves after its termination of its cooperation with the Humenné city authorities.

== History ==
=== 1996–2008: Early years ===
The club was founded on June 12, 1996, under the name Linda Chemes Humenné. In their first season, the club failed to get into the playoff spots in the table. It continued the history of volleyball in Humenné, which dates back to the 1930s and was represented by clubs such as TJ Sokol, TJ Tatran, Chemko, LCHZZ and for a long time Chemlon. The men's team had been a permanent participant in the highest Slovak league up until that point, winning its first championship title in the 2007/08 season.

=== 2009–2010: Most successful season ===
The name VK Chemes Humenné was becoming known on the international European scene. In the GM Capital Challenge cup, VK Chemes managed to advance to the round of 16 before being knocked out by French club Stade Poitevin Poitiers. After beating Prešov and Puchov, VK Chemes got into the final of the Slovak Cup, where they eventually lost to VKP Bratislava.

The journey to the second title for VK Chemes began in the quarterfinals with Svidník, in the semifinals with Nitra and in the final the run was completed with the eastern derby Humenné - Prešov, where Humenné would win all the first 4 sets and win the Slovak Men's Volleyball League.

=== 2013–2015: Last season in the First division ===
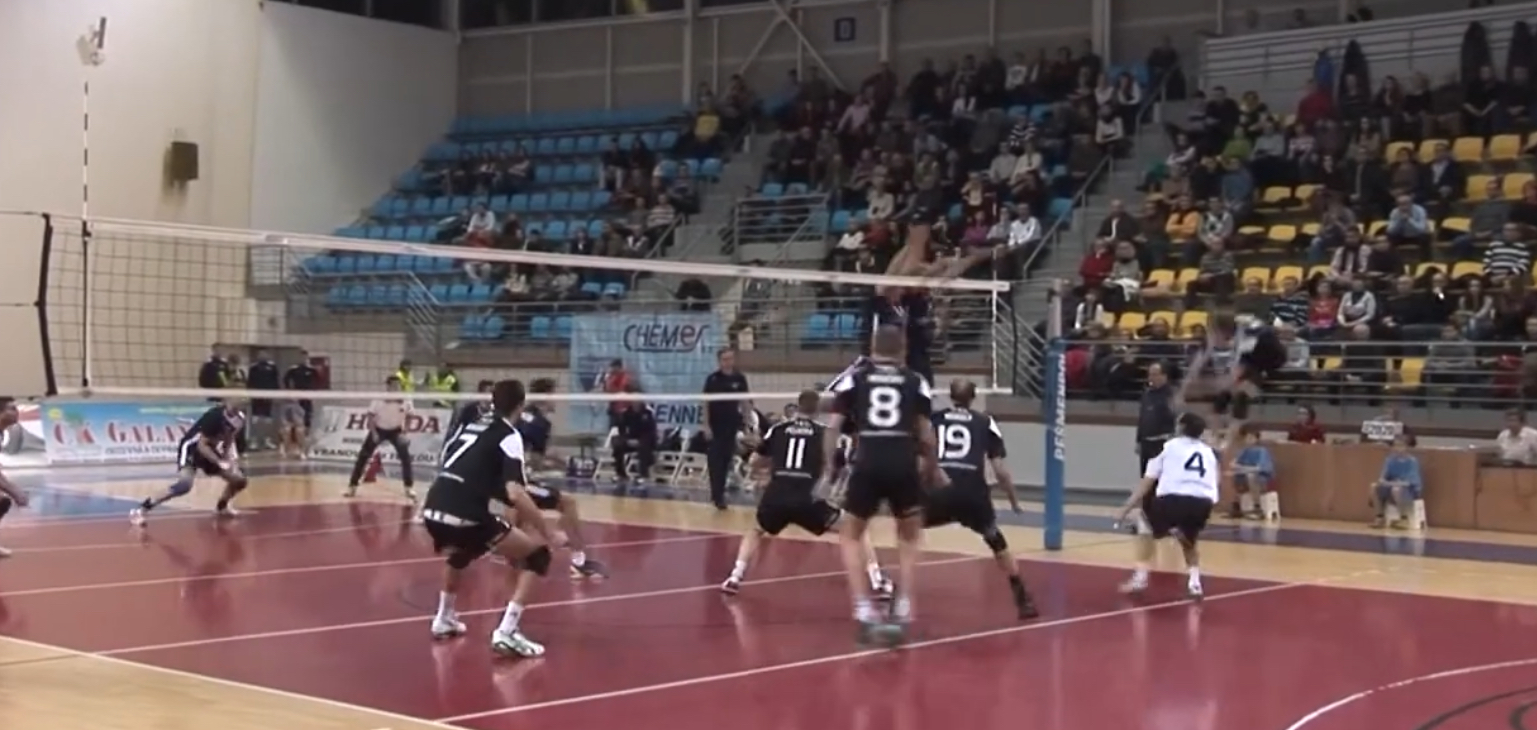
VK Chemes Humenné playing against Spartak VKP Myjava.

In the 2013–2014 season, VK Chemes won the cup once again, beating VK Mirad UNIPO Prešov 3–0 in the final set to win the title for the 3rd time in their history. Humenné also won the league for 4th time in their history, beating Svidník 3–0 in the deciding set.

Later that year, VK Chemes announced that they would not be participating in the First Division of the men's league, due to their general sponsor cutting ties with the club. In December 2014, due to the termination of its cooperation with the Humenné city authorities, the club moved to Spišská Nová Ves and played under the name ŠK Chemes Spišská Nová Ves until the end of the 2014/2015 season.

== Ground ==
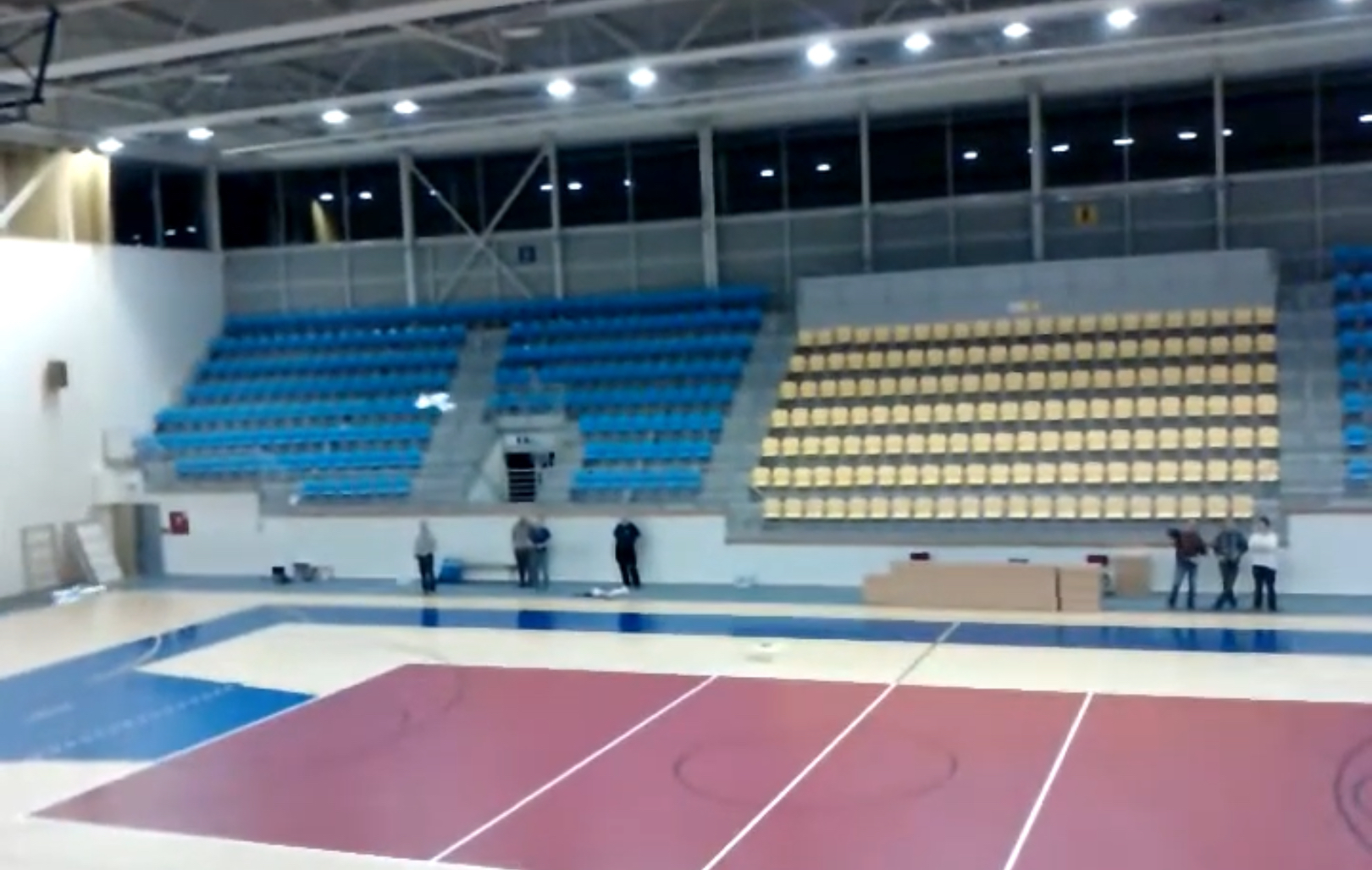
Mestská Športová Hala

Chemes Humenné played their games in the Mestská Športová Hala (Recreation and Sports Facilities of Humenné). The city sports hall has a capacity of approximately 1,200 seats, there are seats for journalists, a VIP room and a meeting room. The facility is also used to host other matches such as youth basketball games.

== Honors ==
=== Domestic ===
- Slovak Men's Volleyball league
  - Winners: 2007/08, 2009/10, 2011/12 and 2013/14
  - Runners-up: 2005/06, 2008/09, 2010/11, and 2012/13
  - 3rd place: 2006/07
- Slovak Men's Volleyball Cup
  - Winners: 2009, 2011, 2014

=== Czech-Slovak Cup ===
- Runners-up: 2011

== European competitions ==
=== CEV Cup ===
- 2006/07: Second round
- 2013: Round of 16

=== CEV Challenge Cup ===
- 2008/09: First round
- 2009/10: Fourth round
- 2011: Second Round
- 2012: Second round
- 2013: Round of 16
- 2015: Quarter-finals

=== Middle European League ===
- 2008/09: 6th place
- 2009/10: 8th place
- 2010/11: 6th place
- 2011/12: 4th place
- 2012/13: 5th place
- 2013/14: 3. Place

== Notable players ==
Players whose name is listed with a bold represented their countries while playing for VK Chemes. For the full list, see here.

- (Australia) **Grigory Sukochev**
- (Spain) Miguel Ángel De Amo
