= 2015–16 CEV Cup =

- League: CEV Cup
- Sport: Volleyball
- Duration: 3 November 2015 – 2 April 2016

Finals
- Champions: (Germany) Berlin Recycling Volleys
- Runners-up: (Russia) Gazprom-Ugra Surgut
- Finals MVP: (United States) Paul Lotman (BER)

CEV Cup seasons
- ← 2014–15 2016–17 →

The 2015–16 CEV Cup was the 44th edition of the European CEV Cup volleyball club tournament.

German club Berlin Recycling Volleys beat Russian Gazprom-Ugra Surgut in both matches of the finals. American outside hitter Paul Lotman representing Berlin Recycling Volleys, was titled Most Valuable Player.

== Participating teams ==
The number of participants on the basis of ranking list for European Cup Competitions:

Rank	Country	Number of teams	Teams
1	France	3	AS Cannes, ASUL Lyon Volley-Ball, Arago de Sète
2	Czech Republic	3	Jihostroj České Budějovice, ČEZ Karlovarsko, Fatra Zlín
3	Netherlands	3	Draisma Dynamo Apeldoorn, Abiant Lycurgus, Landstede Zwolle
4	Finland	3	Kokkolan Tiikerit, Hurrikaani Loimaa, VaLePa Sastamala
5	Romania	2	SCM U Craiova, Remat Zalău
6	Greece	2	Olympiacos Piraeus, Foinikas Syros
7	Slovakia	2	VK Mirad UNIPO Prešov, VK Prievidza
8	Russia	1 +1	Gazprom-Yugra, Dinamo Moscow
9	Italy	1	Sir Safety Perugia
10	Poland	1	Jastrzębski Węgiel
11	Turkey	1	Galatasaray FXTCR Istanbul
12	Belgium	1 +1	Topvolley Antwerpen, Knack Randstad Roeselare
13	Germany	1 +1	SWD Powervolleys Düren, Berlin Recycling Volleys
14	Austria	1	Posojilnica Aich/Dob
15	Switzerland	1 +1	Lausanne UC, #Dragons Lugano
16	Serbia	1	Crvena Zvezda
17	Ukraine	1	Lokomotyv Kharkiv
18	Belarus	1	VK Stroitel Minsk
19	Cyprus	1	Omonoia Nicosia
20	Estonia	1	Pärnu VK
21	Spain	1	CAI Teruel

== Main phase ==
=== 16th Finals ===
The 16 winning teams from the Round of 32 will compete in the Eighthfinals playing home & away matches. The losers of the Round of 32 matches will qualify for the main phase in Challenge Cup.

Team 1	Agg.	Team 2	1st leg	2nd leg	Golden Set
Gazprom-Ugra Surgut (Russia)	6–0	(Netherlands) Abiant Lycurgus	3–0	3–0	
Arago de Sète (France)	2–6	(Finland) Tiikerit Kokkola	1–3	1–3	
Pärnu VK (Estonia)	1–6	(Greece) Olympiacos Piraeus	1–3	0–3	
Fatra Zlín (Czech Republic)	3–5	(Romania) SCM U Craiova	0–3	3–2	
Topvolley Antwerpen (Belgium)	3–4	(Greece) Foinikas Syros	3–1	0–3	11–15
VaLePa Sastamala (Finland)	6–3	(Serbia) Crvena Zvezda	3–1	3–2	
Landstede Zwolle (Netherlands)	2–6	(Switzerland) Lausanne UC	0–3	2–3	
Galatasaray FXTCR Istanbul (Turkey)	4–4	(Romania) Remat Zalău	3–1	1–3	11–15
Jastrzębski Węgiel (Poland)	0–6	(Cyprus) Omonia Nicosia	0–3	0–3	
VK Prievidza (Slovakia)	0–6	(Spain) CAI Teruel	0–3	0–3	
Posojilnica Aich/Dob (Austria)	5–4	(Finland) Hurrikaani Loimaa	3–1	2–3	
VK Stroitel Minsk (Belarus)	0–6	(France) AS Cannes	0–3	0–3	
SWD Powervolleys Düren (Germany)	6–1	(France) ASUL Lyon Volley-Ball	3–0	3–1	
Draisma Dynamo Apeldoorn (Netherlands)	0–6	(Czech Republic) Jihostroj České Budějovice	0–3	0–3	
Lokomotyv Kharkiv (Ukraine)	4–4	(Slovakia) VK Mirad UNIPO Prešov	3–1	1–3	11–15
Sir Safety Perugia (Italy)	6–1	(Czech Republic) ČEZ Karlovarsko	3–0	3–1	

==== First leg ====
Date	Time		Score		Set 1	Set 2	Set 3	Set 4	Set 5	Total	Report
3 Nov	19:00	Gazprom-Ugra Surgut (Russia)	3–0	(Netherlands) Abiant Lycurgus	26–24	25–23	25–20			76–67	Report
3 Nov	20:00	Arago de Sète (France)	1–3	(Finland) Tiikerit Kokkola	17–25	23–25	28–26	22–25		90–101	Report
5 Nov	20:00	Pärnu VK (Estonia)	1–3	(Greece) Olympiacos Piraeus	25–20	20–25	30–32	16–25		91–102	Report
5 Nov	17:00	Fatra Zlín (Czech Republic)	0–3	(Romania) SCM U Craiova	19–25	18–25	22–25			59–75	Report
4 Nov	20:30	Topvolley Antwerpen (Belgium)	3–1	(Greece) Foinikas Syros	26–28	25–15	25–18	25–15		101–76	Report
4 Nov	18:30	VaLePa Sastamala (Finland)	3–1	(Serbia) Crvena Zvezda	25–21	25–22	16–25	25–18		91–86	Report
4 Nov	19:30	Landstede Zwolle (Netherlands)	0–3	(Switzerland) Lausanne UC	22–25	16–25	18–25			56–75	Report
5 Nov	18:30	Galatasaray FXTCR Istanbul (Turkey)	3–1	(Romania) Remat Zalău	22–25	25–20	25–13	25–19		97–77	Report
–	–	Jastrzębski Węgiel (Poland)	0–3	(Cyprus) Omonia Nicosia	0–25	0–25	0–25			0–75	Report
4 Nov	18:00	VK Prievidza (Slovakia)	0–3	(Spain) CAI Teruel	21–25	20–25	20–25			61–75	Report
4 Nov	19:00	Posojilnica Aich/Dob (Austria)	3–1	(Finland) Hurrikaani Loimaa	25–22	25–22	21–25	25–17		96–86	Report
4 Nov	19:30	VK Stroitel Minsk (Belarus)	0–3	(France) AS Cannes	16–25	22–25	14–25			52–75	Report
4 Nov	18:30	SWD Powervolleys Düren (Germany)	3–0	(France) ASUL Lyon Volley-Ball	25–23	25–18	25–19			75–60	Report
4 Nov	20:00	Draisma Dynamo Apeldoorn (Netherlands)	0–3	(Czech Republic) Jihostroj České Budějovice	21–25	23–25	18–25			62–75	Report
11 Nov	17:00	Lokomotyv Kharkiv (Ukraine)	3–1	(Slovakia) VK Mirad UNIPO Prešov	25–16	21–25	25–20	26–24		97–85	Report
4 Nov	20:30	Sir Safety Perugia (Italy)	3–0	(Czech Republic) ČEZ Karlovarsko	25–21	25–17	25–21			75–59	Report

==== Second leg ====
Date	Time		Score		Set 1	Set 2	Set 3	Set 4	Set 5	Total	Report
18 Nov	20:00	Abiant Lycurgus (Netherlands)	0–3	(Russia) Gazprom-Ugra Surgut	17–25	22–25	18–25			57–75	Report
18 Nov	18:30	Tiikerit Kokkola (Finland)	3–1	(France) Arago de Sète	25–23	18–25	25–19	25–20		93–87	Report
18 Nov	20:30	Olympiacos Piraeus (Greece)	3–0	(Estonia) Pärnu VK	25–23	25–17	25–15			75–55	Report
18 Nov	18:00	SCM U Craiova (Romania)	2–3	(Czech Republic) Fatra Zlín	26–28	25–17	25–22	21–25	13–15	110–107	Report
18 Nov	19:00	Foinikas Syros (Greece)	3–0	(Belgium) Topvolley Antwerpen	25–9	25–23	25–20			75–52	Report
Golden set		Foinikas Syros (Greece)	15–11	(Belgium) Topvolley Antwerpen							
17 Nov	18:00	Crvena Zvezda (Serbia)	2–3	(Finland) VaLePa Sastamala	25–23	23–25	25–23	22–25	12–15	107–111	Report
18 Nov	20:00	Lausanne UC (Switzerland)	3–2	(Netherlands) Landstede Zwolle	21–25	25–23	26–24	26–28	15–10	113–110	Report
18 Nov	18:00	Remat Zalău (Romania)	3–1	(Turkey) Galatasaray FXTCR Istanbul	22–25	25–22	25–16	25–18		97–81	Report
Golden set		Remat Zalău (Romania)	15–11	(Turkey) Galatasaray FXTCR Istanbul							
–	–	Omonia Nicosia (Cyprus)	3–0	(Poland) Jastrzębski Węgiel	25–0	25–0	25–0			75–0	Report
18 Nov	20:15	CAI Teruel (Spain)	3–0	(Slovakia) VK Prievidza	25–14	25–17	34–32			84–63	Report
17 Nov	18:30	Hurrikaani Loimaa (Finland)	3–2	(Austria) Posojilnica Aich/Dob	16–25	25–19	25–21	22–25	15–13	103–103	Report
17 Nov	20:00	AS Cannes (France)	3–0	(Belarus) VK Stroitel Minsk	25–22	25–18	25–20			75–60	Report
18 Nov	19:00	ASUL Lyon Volley-Ball (France)	1–3	(Germany) SWD Powervolleys Düren	25–19	20–25	23–25	23–25		91–94	Report
17 Nov	18:00	Jihostroj České Budějovice (Czech Republic)	3–0	(Netherlands) Draisma Dynamo Apeldoorn	25–19	25–19	27–25			77–63	Report
18 Nov	17:00	VK Prešov (Slovakia)	3–1	(Ukraine) Lokomotyv Kharkiv	25–23	25–22	26–28	25–17		101–90	Report
Golden set		VK Prešov (Slovakia)	15–11	(Ukraine) Lokomotyv Kharkiv							
18 Nov	18:00	ČEZ Karlovarsko (Czech Republic)	1–3	(Italy) Sir Safety Perugia	25–20	22–25	19–25	19–25		85–95	Report

=== 8th Finals ===
The 8 winning teams from the eighthfinals will compete in the quarterfinals playing home & away matches.

Team 1	Agg.	Team 2	1st leg	2nd leg
Tiikerit Kokkola (Finland)	2–6	(Russia) Gazprom-Ugra Surgut	1–3	1–3
SCM U Craiova (Romania)	2–6	(Greece) Olympiacos Piraeus	2–3	0–3
VaLePa Sastamala (Finland)	5–3	(Greece) Foinikas Syros	3–0	2–3
Lausanne UC (Switzerland)	1–6	(Romania) Remat Zalău	1–3	0–3
CAI Teruel (Spain)	6–2	(Cyprus) Omonia Nicosia	3–0	3–2
Posojilnica Aich/Dob (Austria)	0–6	(France) AS Cannes	0–3	0–3
SWD Powervolleys Düren (Germany)	6–2	(Czech Republic) Jihostroj České Budějovice	3–2	3–0
VK Prešov (Slovakia)	0–6	(Italy) Sir Safety Perugia	0–3	0–3

==== First leg ====
Date	Time		Score		Set 1	Set 2	Set 3	Set 4	Set 5	Total	Report
2 Dec	18:30	Tiikerit Kokkola (Finland)	1–3	(Russia) Gazprom-Ugra Surgut	25–20	22–25	23–25	22–25		92–95	Report
2 Dec	18:00	SCM U Craiova (Romania)	2–3	(Greece) Olympiacos Piraeus	21–25	25–16	19–25	25–22	12–15	102–103	Report
3 Dec	18:30	VaLePa Sastamala (Finland)	3–0	(Greece) Foinikas Syros	25–22	25–16	26–24			76–62	Report
2 Dec	19:30	Lausanne UC (Switzerland)	1–3	(Romania) Remat Zalău	26–24	23–25	21–25	20–25		90–99	Report
1 Dec	20:15	CAI Teruel (Spain)	3–0	(Cyprus) Omonia Nicosia	25–23	25–22	25–19			75–64	Report
2 Dec	19:00	Posojilnica Aich/Dob (Austria)	0–3	(France) AS Cannes	15–25	19–25	13–25			47–75	Report
2 Dec	18:30	SWD Powervolleys Düren (Germany)	3–2	(Czech Republic) Jihostroj České Budějovice	23–25	18–25	25–17	25–23	15–8	106–98	Report
1 Dec	17:00	VK Prešov (Slovakia)	0–3	(Italy) Sir Safety Perugia	21–25	15–25	17–25			53–75	Report

==== Second leg ====
Date	Time		Score		Set 1	Set 2	Set 3	Set 4	Set 5	Total	Report
15 Dec	19:00	Gazprom-Ugra Surgut (Russia)	3–1	(Finland) Tiikerit Kokkola	22–25	25–16	25–16	25–20		97–77	Report
15 Dec	18:00	Olympiacos Piraeus (Greece)	3–0	(Romania) SCM U Craiova	25–20	25–15	25–18			75–53	Report
16 Dec	18:00	Foinikas Syros (Greece)	3–2	(Finland) VaLePa Sastamala	22–25	25–22	23–25	27–25	15–12	112–109	Report
16 Dec	18:00	Remat Zalău (Romania)	3–0	(Switzerland) Lausanne UC	25–19	25–18	25–18			75–55	Report
15 Dec	20:00	Omonia Nicosia (Cyprus)	2–3	(Spain) CAI Teruel	16–25	25–21	20–25	25–22	13–15	99–108	Report
15 Dec	20:00	AS Cannes (France)	3–0	(Austria) Posojilnica Aich/Dob	25–22	25–15	25–16			75–53	Report
16 Dec	18:00	Jihostroj České Budějovice (Czech Republic)	0–3	(Germany) SWD Powervolleys Düren	20–25	20–25	19–25			59–75	Report
16 Dec	20:30	Sir Safety Perugia (Italy)	3–0	(Slovakia) VK Prešov	25–12	25–16	25–16			75–44	Report

=== 4th Finals ===
Team 1	Agg.	Team 2	1st leg	2nd leg	Golden Set
Gazprom-Ugra Surgut (Russia)	6–2	(Greece) Olympiacos Piraeus	3–2	3–0	
VaLePa Sastamala (Finland)	6–1	(Romania) Remat Zalău	3–1	3–0	
AS Cannes (France)	4–4	(Spain) CAI Teruel	3–1	1–3	11–15
SWD Powervolleys Düren (Germany)	2–6	(Italy) Sir Safety Perugia	1–3	1–3	

==== First leg ====
Date	Time		Score		Set 1	Set 2	Set 3	Set 4	Set 5	Total	Report
20 Jan	19:00	Gazprom-Ugra Surgut (Russia)	3–2	(Greece) Olympiacos Piraeus	25–23	23–25	18–25	25–23	15–13	106–109	Report
20 Jan	18:30	VaLePa Sastamala (Finland)	3–1	(Romania) Remat Zalău	25–16	25–17	20–25	25–19		95–77	Report
20 Jan	20:00	AS Cannes (France)	3–1	(Spain) CAI Teruel	25–22	25–19	27–29	25–18		102–88	Report
20 Jan	18:30	SWD Powervolleys Düren (Germany)	1–3	(Italy) Sir Safety Perugia	23–25	21–25	26–24	15–25		85–99	Report

==== Second leg ====
Date	Time		Score		Set 1	Set 2	Set 3	Set 4	Set 5	Total	Report
27 Jan	17:00	Olympiacos Piraeus (Greece)	0–3	(Russia) Gazprom-Ugra Surgut	22–25	22–25	24–26			68–76	Report
27 Jan	18:00	Remat Zalău (Romania)	0–3	(Finland) VaLePa Sastamala	23–25	21–25	22–25			66–75	Report
27 Jan	20:15	CAI Teruel (Spain)	3–1	(France) AS Cannes	25–22	25–23	20–25	25–19		95–89	Report
Golden set		CAI Teruel (Spain)	15–10	(France) AS Cannes							
27 Jan	20:30	Sir Safety Perugia (Italy)	3–1	(Germany) SWD Powervolleys Düren	25–15	25–14	22–25	25–17		97–71	Report

== Challenge phase ==
In this stage of the competition, the four qualified teams of the Main phase are joined by the four teams with best third-placed finish from the 2015–16 CEV Champions League pool stage.

Team 1	Agg.	Team 2	1st leg	2nd leg	Golden Set
CAI Teruel (Spain)	1–6	(Belgium) Knack Randstad Roeselare	1–3	0–3	
VaLePa Sastamala (Finland)	3–4	(Germany) Berlin Recycling Volleys	3–1	0–3	11–15
Sir Safety-Sicoma Perugia (Italy)	3–4	(Russia) Dinamo Moscow	0–3	3–1	13–15
#Dragons Lugano (Switzerland)	1–6	(Russia) Gazprom-Ugra Surgut	0–3	1–3	

=== First leg ===
Date	Time		Score		Set 1	Set 2	Set 3	Set 4	Set 5	Total	Report
17 Feb	20:15	CAI Teruel (Spain)	1–3	(Belgium) Knack Randstad Roeselare	22–25	20–25	25–22	30–32		97–104	Report
17 Feb	18:30	VaLePa Sastamala (Finland)	3–1	(Germany) Berlin Recycling Volleys	29–31	25–20	28–26	25–21		107–98	Report
18 Feb	20:30	Sir Safety-Sicoma Perugia (Italy)	0–3	(Russia) Dinamo Moscow	20–25	19–25	22–25			61–75	Report
1 Mar	19:00	#Dragons Lugano (Switzerland)	0–3	(Russia) Gazprom-Ugra Surgut	23–25	16–25	21–25			60–75	Report

=== Second leg ===
Date	Time		Score		Set 1	Set 2	Set 3	Set 4	Set 5	Total	Report
3 Mar	20:30	Knack Randstad Roeselare (Belgium)	3–0	(Spain) CAI Teruel	25–23	25–14	25–19			75–56	Report
3 Mar	19:30	Berlin Recycling Volleys (Germany)	3–0	(Finland) VaLePa Sastamala	25–22	32–30	25–19			82–71	Report
Golden set		Berlin Recycling Volleys (Germany)	15–11	(Finland) VaLePa Sastamala							
2 Mar	19:00	Dinamo Moscow (Russia)	1–3	(Italy) Sir Safety-Sicoma Perugia	21–25	18–25	25–23	15–25		79–98	Report
Golden set		Dinamo Moscow (Russia)	15–13	(Italy) Sir Safety-Sicoma Perugia							
2 Mar	19:00	Gazprom-Ugra Surgut (Russia)	3–1	(Switzerland) #Dragons Lugano	21–25	25–23	25–22	25–19		96–89	Report

== Final phase ==
=== Semi finals ===
Team 1	Agg.	Team 2	1st leg	2nd leg	Golden Set
Knack Randstad Roeselare (Belgium)	2–6	(Germany) Berlin Recycling Volleys	2–3	0–3	
Dinamo Moscow (Russia)	3–3	(Russia) Gazprom-Ugra Surgut	3–0	0–3	11–15

==== First leg ====
Date	Time		Score		Set 1	Set 2	Set 3	Set 4	Set 5	Total	Report
15 Mar	20:30	Knack Randstad Roeselare (Belgium)	2–3	(Germany) Berlin Recycling Volleys	31–29	23–25	25–21	21–25	10–15	110–115	Report
15 Mar	19:00	Dinamo Moscow (Russia)	3–0	(Russia) Gazprom-Ugra Surgut	25–23	25–21	25–18			75–62	Report

==== Second leg ====
Date	Time		Score		Set 1	Set 2	Set 3	Set 4	Set 5	Total	Report
19 Mar	18:30	Berlin Recycling Volleys (Germany)	3–0	(Belgium) Knack Randstad Roeselare	25–14	25–21	25–18			75–53	Report
19 Mar	18:00	Gazprom-Ugra Surgut (Russia)	3–0	(Russia) Dinamo Moscow	25–23	25–20	25–22			75–65	Report
Golden set		Gazprom-Ugra Surgut (Russia)	15–11	(Russia) Dinamo Moscow							

=== Final ===
==== First leg ====
Date	Time		Score		Set 1	Set 2	Set 3	Set 4	Set 5	Total	Report
29 Mar	19:30	Berlin Recycling Volleys (Germany)	3–2	(Russia) Gazprom-Ugra Surgut	28–26	16–25	25–17	20–25	15–11	104–104	Report

==== Second leg ====
Date	Time		Score		Set 1	Set 2	Set 3	Set 4	Set 5	Total	Report
2 Apr	18:00	Gazprom-Ugra Surgut (Russia)	0–3	(Germany) Berlin Recycling Volleys	18–25	18–25	18–25			54–75	Report

== Final standing ==
Rank	Team
1st place, gold medalist(s)	(Germany) Berlin Recycling Volleys
2nd place, silver medalist(s)	(Russia) Gazprom-Ugra Surgut
Semifinalists	(Belgium) Knack Randstad Roeselare
Semifinalists	(Russia) Dinamo Moscow

2016 CEV Cup winner
(Germany)
Berlin Recycling Volleys
1st title

Erik Shoji, Robert Kromm, Felix Fischer, Nicolas Le Goff, Arpad Baroti, Paul Lotman, Sebastian Kühner, Tsimafei Zhukouski, Paul Carroll, Ruben Schott, Tomas Kmet, Francesco De Marchi
Head coach
Roberto Serniotti
