= 2003–04 Slovak 1. Liga season =

Slovak ice hockey league season

The 2003–04 Slovak 1.Liga season was the 11th season of the Slovak 1. Liga, the second level of ice hockey in Slovakia. 11 teams participated in the league, and HK Spartak Dubnica won the championship.

== Regular season ==
| | Club | GP | W | OTW | OTL | L | Goals | Pts |
|---|---|---|---|---|---|---|---|---|
| 1. | PHK Prešov | 40 | 26 | 5 | 0 | 9 | 132:81 | 88 |
| 2. | HK Spartak Dubnica | 40 | 23 | 3 | 3 | 11 | 162:107 | 78 |
| 3. | HC VTJ Topoľčany | 40 | 21 | 5 | 1 | 13 | 141:123 | 74 |
| 4. | MšHK Prievidza | 40 | 20 | 4 | 3 | 13 | 131:108 | 71 |
| 5. | HKm Zvolen B | 40 | 21 | 2 | 2 | 15 | 130:105 | 69 |
| 6. | HK Spišská Nová Ves | 40 | 18 | 1 | 5 | 16 | 121:126 | 61 |
| 7. | HC Košice B | 40 | 13 | 5 | 4 | 18 | 136:137 | 53 |
| 8. | HC Dukla Senica | 40 | 15 | 1 | 1 | 23 | 134:145 | 48 |
| 9. | HC Dukla Trenčín B | 40 | 11 | 2 | 5 | 22 | 121:165 | 42 |
| 10. | ŠaHK Iskra Banská Bystrica | 40 | 10 | 2 | 5 | 23 | 103:149 | 39 |
| 11. | HK 95 Považská Bystrica | 40 | 9 | 3 | 4 | 24 | 117:182 | 37 |

== Playoffs ==
=== Quarterfinals ===
- PHK Prešov – HC Dukla KAV Hurban Senica 3:1 (6:1, 4:2, 0:1, 4:3)
- Spartak Dubnica nad Váhom – HK VTJ Trebišov 3:0 (6:5, 4:3, 2:1)
- HC VTJ Telvis Topoľčany – HK Spišská Nová Ves 3:0 (4:0. 4:3PP, 4:1)
- MšHK Prievidza – HKm Detva (Zvolen B) 3:0 (6:1, 5:1, 4:3)

=== Semifinals ===
- PHK Prešov – MšHK Prievidza 1:3 (2:3, 3:5, 8:1, 1:4)
- Spartak Dubnica nad Váhom – HC VTJ Telvis Topoľčany 3:0 (4:2, 5:1, 2:1)

=== 3rd place ===
- PHK Prešov – HC VTJ Telvis Topoľčany 2:0 (4:1, 8:7)

=== Finál ===
- Spartak Dubnica nad Váhom – MšHK Prievidza 4:3 (1:2, 1:3, 4:2, 1:4, 5:2, 6:3, 5:2)
