= Czechoslovak Men's Volleyball Championship =

Volleyball competition

Czechoslovak Championship
- Sport: Volleyball
- Founded: 1924
- First season: 1924
- Folded: 1991
- Administrator: ČSVS
- Country: Czechoslovakia
- Continent: Europe
- Level on pyramid: 1st Level
- Domestic cup: Czechoslovak Cup
- International cups: CEV Champions League; CEV Cup; CEV Challenge Cup

The Czechoslovak Men's Volleyball Championship was an annual competition for the men's volleyball teams in Czechoslovakia. It was held from 1924 to 1992. The most number of titles is in the account of the Praha team "Rudá hvězda" (since 1990 "Olympus") with 10.

The organizer of the championships was the Czechoslovak Volleyball Union (ČSVS). After the announcement of the upcoming disintegration of Czechoslovakia on 1 January 1993, ČSVS split into the Czech Volleyball Union and the Slovak Volleyball Federation. Since the 1992–93 season, independent championships of the Czech Republic and Slovakia have been held.

== Winners list ==
- 1924: Strakova Akademie Praha
- 1925: Vysokoškolský VK Praha
- 1926: Vysokoškolský VK Praha
- 1927: Strakova Akademie Praha
- 1928: Strakova Akademie Praha
- 1929: Sokol Kroměříž
- 1930: Strakova Akademie Praha
- 1931: Strakova Akademie Praha
- 1932: Sokol Kroměříž
- 1933: VS Marathon Praha
- 1934: VO Sumter
- 1935: Sokol Plzeň V
- 1936: Sokol Kroměříž
- 1937: Sokol Vysočany
- 1938: Sokol Vysočany
- 1939: Sokol Pardubice I
- 1940: SK Philips Praha
- 1941: SK Philips Praha
- 1942: SK Viktorie Plzeň
- 1943: SK Philips Praha
- 1944: SK Pardubice
- 1945: SK Philips Praha
- 1946: SK Židenice Brno
- 1947: SK Život Praha
- 1948: Sokol Kolín
- 1949: Sokol Kolín
- 1950: ATK Praha
- 1951: ATK Praha
- 1952: ATK Praha
- 1953: UDA Praha
- 1954: UDA Praha
- 1955: Slavia Praha
- 1956: Slavia Praha
- 1957: Slavia Praha
- 1958: Slavia Praha
- 1959: Slavia Praha
- 1960: Dukla Kolín
- 1961: Dukla Kolín
- 1962: Lokomotiva Praha
- 1963: Dukla Kolín
- 1964: Slavia Praha
- 1965: Spartak Brno
- 1966: Rudá hvězda Praha
- 1967: Spartak Brno
- 1968: VZKG Ostrava
- 1969: Zetor Zbrojovka Brno
- 1970: Zetor Zbrojovka Brno
- 1971: Zetor Zbrojovka Brno
- 1972: Rudá hvězda Praha
- 1973: Dukla Liberec
- 1974: Zbrojovka Brno
- 1975: Dukla Liberec
- 1976: Dukla Liberec
- 1977: Aero Odolena Voda
- 1978: Červená hvězda Bratislava
- 1979: Červená hvězda Bratislava
- 1980: Dukla Liberec
- 1981: Červená hvězda Bratislava
- 1982: Rudá hvězda Praha
- 1983: Dukla Liberec
- 1984: Rudá hvězda Praha
- 1985: Rudá hvězda Praha
- 1986: Rudá hvězda Praha
- 1987: Aero Odolena Voda
- 1988: Aero Odolena Voda
- 1989: Rudá hvězda Praha
- 1990: Zbrojovka Brno
- 1991: Olymp Praha
- 1992: Olymp Praha
