= Gazprom-Ugra Surgut =

Russian volleyball club

VC Gazprom-Yugra
- Full name: Volleyball Club Gazprom-Yugra
- Short name: Gazprom-Yugra
- Founded: 1996
- Ground: Premier Arena, Surgut (Capacity: 2,000)
- Chairman: Yuri Vazhenin
- Manager: Rafael Habibullin
- Captain: Alexey Rodichev
- League: Super League
- 2020/21: 12th
- Website: Club home page

Uniforms
Home	Away

Gazprom-Ugra (Russian: Газпром-Югра) is a Russian men's volleyball club from Surgut. It was founded in 1996. Previously he performed under the names Gazovik (1996-1997), Gazovik-ZSK (1997-2000), ZSK-Gazprom (2000-2007). Basic colors - white and blue.

== Achievements ==
- CEV Cup
  - Finalist (1) 2016
- CEV Challenge Cup
  - Third (1): 2017-18
