= Futbalový štadión Prievidza =

Sports venue in Prievidza, Slovakia

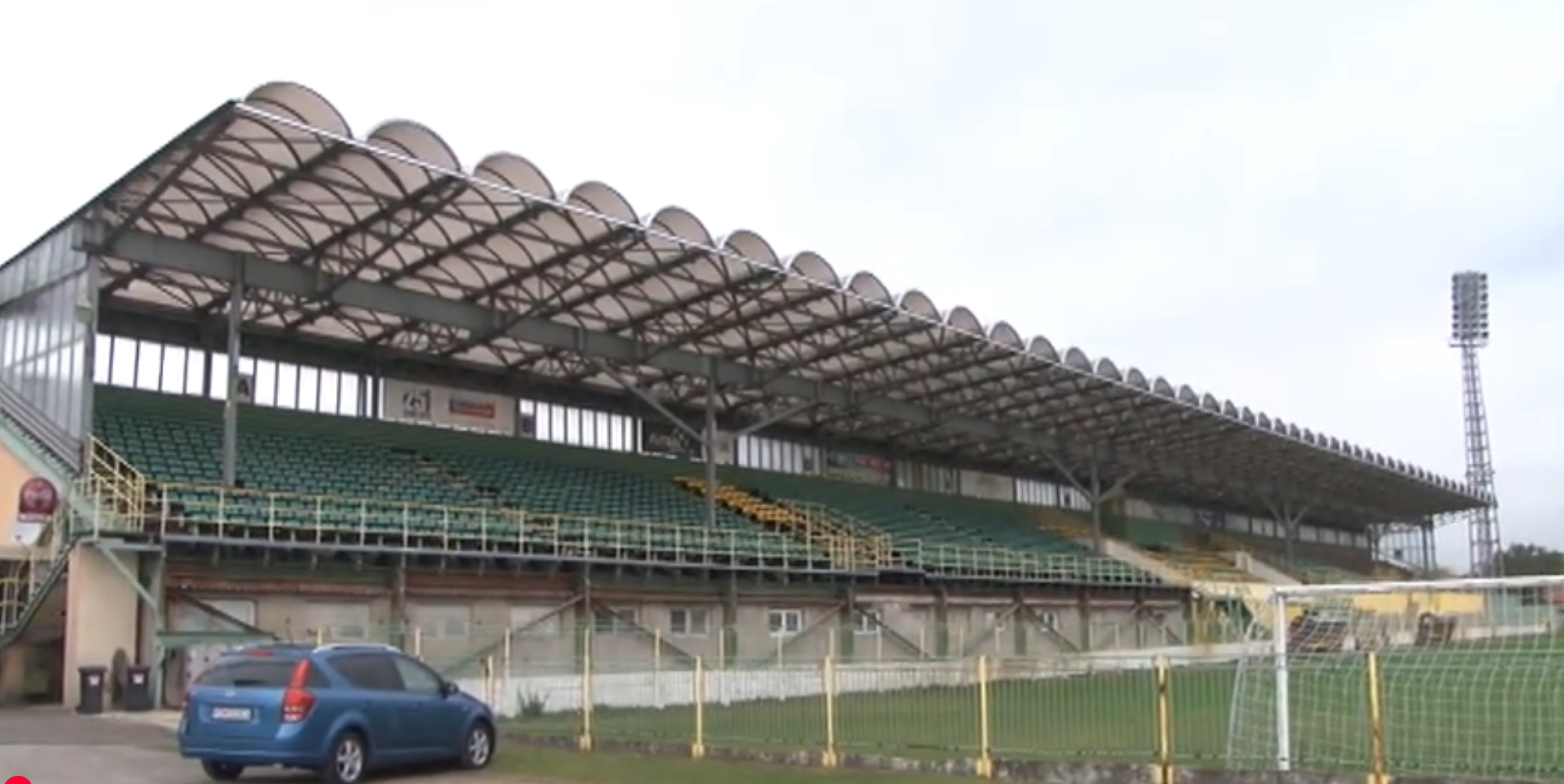
- Interactive map of Futbalový štadión Prievidza
- Location: Športová 37 Prievidza, Slovakia
- Coordinates: 48°46′43.39″N 18°37′26.48″E
- Capacity: 7,500
- Surface: Grass
- Field size: 105 x 68 m

Construction
- Renovated: 2016–?

Tenant
- FC Baník Prievidza

Futbalový štadión Prievidza is a multi-use stadium in Prievidza, Slovakia. It is currently used mostly for football matches and is the home ground of FC Baník Prievidza. The stadium holds 7,500 people (2,500 seating).

== History ==
=== Reconstruction ===
In 2016, the reconstruction of the stadium began, worth €1.25 million. Slovak government provided €750,000 of the cost. In November 2018, a major reconstruction of the stadium began. The project saw the largest investment in decades. The investment in the reconstruction of the football stadium was 1.23 million euros.

== Description ==
The main grass field of the stadium has dimensions of 150 m x 68 m, an auxiliary grass field with dimensions of 91 m x 60 m. The capacity of the stadium is 7,500 of which 2,500 are seats.

== Other uses ==
In 2014, the Slovak Ultimate Frisbee Championship took place for the second time in the Futbalový štadión Prievidza.

== International matches ==
Futbalový štadión Prievidza has hosted one friendly match of the Slovakia national football team.

16 November 1993	Slovakia	2–0	Slovenia
17:00		Report
