= Grigory Sukochev =

Australian volleyball player (born 1988)

Personal information
- Nationality: Australian
- Born: February 18, 1988 (age 38); Tashkent, Uzbekistan
Titles
2011–2012 Slovak Men’s Volleyball league winners

Gregory Sukochev (born 18 February 1988, in Tashkent) is an Australian volleyball player. He competed for Australia at the 2012 Summer Olympics. Sukochev is also known for playing with Slovak volleyball club VK Chemes Humenné.
