= HC Prievidza =

- City: Prievidza, Slovakia
- League: Slovak 2. Liga
- Founded: 1954
- Home arena: Prievidza Ice Stadium (capacity 3,986)
- Colours: Green, black, white, yellow
- Website: hcprievidza.sk

HC Prievidza is an ice hockey team playing in the Slovak 2. Liga and formed in 1954. They play in the city of Prievidza, Slovakia at Zimný štadión Prievidza.

== Honours ==
=== Domestic ===
Slovak 1. Liga

- (silver) Runners-up (1): 2003–04

== Club names ==
- Baník Prievidza (1954–1975)
- TJ Banské Stavby Prievidza (1975–1998)
- Polygon Prievidza (1998–2000)
- HC Prievidza (2000–2002)
- MšHK Prievidza (2002–2010)
- HC Prievidza (2010–2014)
- MšHK Bulldogs Prievidza (2014–2015)
- HC Prievidza (2015–present)
