= Koš =

- Municipality
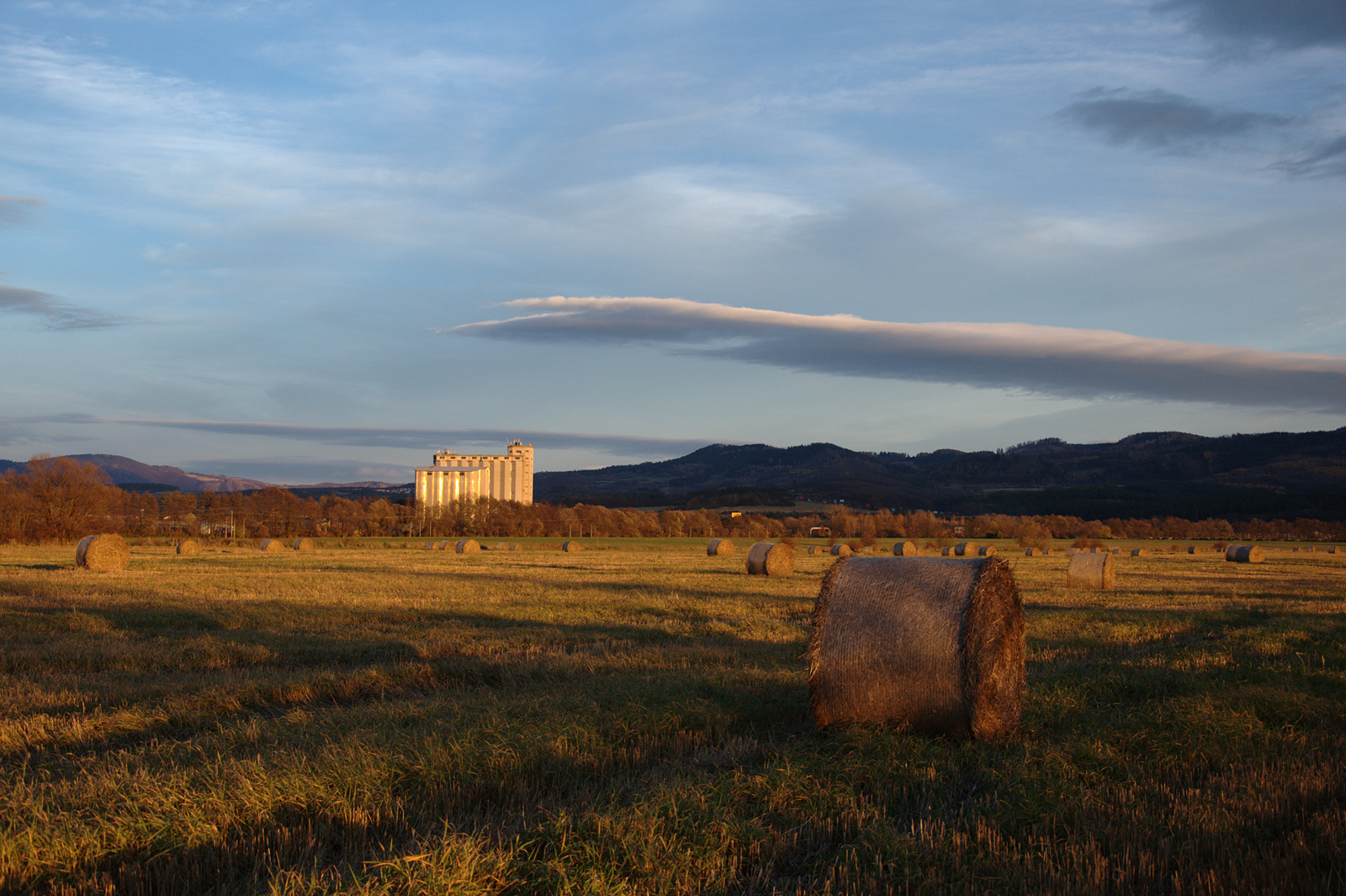

- Flag

- Location of Koš in the Trenčín Region Location of Koš in Slovakia
- Coordinates: 48.75°N 18.58°E
- Country: Slovakia
- Region: Trenčín Region
- District: Prievidza District
- First mentioned: 1367

Area
  - Total: 13.58 km^{2} (5.24 sq mi)
- Elevation: 312 m (1,024 ft)

Population (2025)
  - Total: 1,002
- Time zone: UTC+1 (CET)
  - Summer (DST): UTC+2 (CEST)
- Postal code: 972 41
- Area code: +421 46
- Vehicle registration plate (until 2022): PD
- Website: www.obec-kos.sk

Koš (German: Andreasdorf, Hungarian: Kós) is a village and municipality in Prievidza District in the Trenčín Region of western Slovakia.

== Geography ==
The municipality lies at an altitude of 312 metres (1,024 ft) and covers an area of 13.58 km^{2} (5.24 sq mi) (2025).

== Etymology ==
Slovak: Kôš, koš means a basket, but also a knitted fence. (Kos, 1408).

== History ==
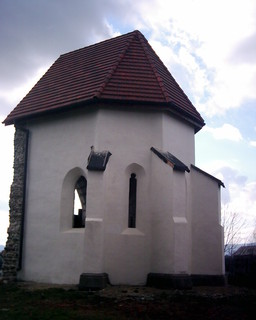
The extant St Andrew's Chapel

The village of Koš was mentioned for the first time in 1365. The new settlement was called Andreasdorf (Andrew's village) probably because of the church being consecrated to Saint Andrew. The name of the village was later changed to Koš.

== Church and chapel ==
St Andrew's church was a Gothic structure finished in 1409, according to the date inscribed into the central arch, largely rebuilt in 1940 and demolished in 2000 because it was endangered by mine workings. A replacement church dedicated to the Lord and Saviour Jesus Christ, King of the Universe, was built in a safe part of the village and contains the historic furnishings of the original, including a 15th-century Madonna and a 15th-century chalice. The present St Andrew's chapel is a remnant of the Gothic structure, originally a presbytery. The interior of the church was painted with unique wall paintings, now mostly destroyed, traces of which survive in the chapel. A copy of the presbytery was included in the newly built replacement church.

In the region of Prievidza, there is a mining industry of lignite and brown coal which influences the environment in the area. The original church was situated in one of the affected parts of the village and was made unsafe by being undermined, for which reason the representatives of the regional restoration workshop of the Monumental Institute in Banská Bystrica decided to save at least part of it as an historic building. A unique transportation in Slovak history was planned and the 400-tonne presbytery (chapel) was transported using a wheeled transporter borrowed from Germany on December 6, 2000. It is now stands in another part of Koš which is not affected by the mining.

=== Church panorama ===
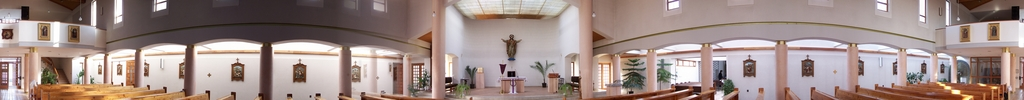
Panorama of the interior of the Church of the Lord and Saviour Jesus Christ, King of the Universe, that replaced the demolished St Andrew's Church

== Population ==
Population statistic (10 years)
Year	1995	2005	2015	2025
Count	799	963	1138	1002
Difference		+20.52%	+18.17%	−11.95%

Population statistic
Year	2024	2025
Count	1005	1002
Difference		−0.29%

It has a population of 1002 people (31 December 2025).

=== Ethnicity ===
Census 2021 (1+ %)
Ethnicity	Number	Fraction
Slovak	941	90.39%
Not found out	97	9.31%
Total	1041	

In year 2021 was 1041 people by ethnicity 941 as Slovak, 97 as Not found out, 5 as Czech, 2 as Moravian, 1 as Ukrainian, 1 as Serbian, 1 as Russian, 1 as Hungarian and 1 as Other.

Note on population: The difference values of population numbers in the table "Population statistic" and in the sections "Ethnicity" & "Religion" is caused by the use of various statistical methods.

=== Religion ===
Census 2021 (1+ %)
Religion	Number	Fraction
Roman Catholic Church	581	55.81%
None	310	29.78%
Not found out	99	9.51%
Evangelical Church	13	1.25%
Other and not ascertained christian church	12	1.15%
Total	1041	

In year 2021 was 1041 people by religion 581 from Roman Catholic Church, 310 from None, 99 from Not found out, 13 from Evangelical Church, 12 from Other and not ascertained christian church, 10 from Seventh-day Adventist Church, 6 from Greek Catholic Church, 5 from Ad hoc movements, 2 from Christian Congregations in Slovakia, 1 from Eastern Orthodox Church, 1 from Islam and 1 from Buddhism.

== Genealogical resources ==
The records for genealogical research are available at the state archive "Statny Archiv in Nitra, Slovakia"

- Roman Catholic church records (births/marriages/deaths): 1691-1906 (parish A)

== See also ==
- List of municipalities and towns in Slovakia
