= VK Prievidza =

Slovak volleyball club

- Full name: Volejbalový klub Prievidza
- Nickname: Kohúti (Roosters)
- Founded: 1932
- Ground: Niké Aréna, Prievidza (Capacity: 3,400)
- League: Slovak Men's Volleyball League
- Championships: (2x) 2017/2018 and 2018/2019

VK Prievidza (Slovak: Volejbalový klub Prievidza) is a Slovak volleyball club based in the city of Prievidza that currently plays in the Slovak Men's Volleyball League, the highest domestic level in the country.

They have been playing in Slovakia's top division since the 2013/2014 season. Prievidza have won the competition twice, in 2018 and in 2019. The club has also participated in the CEV Cup and the CEV Challenge Cup.

== History ==
=== 1920–1932: Founding of VK Prievidza ===
In the region of Nitra, volleyball began to be played between the years 1920–1922 in the gymnasium of Prievidza. Ján Hromádka who worked there, initiated the construction of the first volleyball court in the area. In 1930, the gymnasium moved to a new building in Výstrkov, where the students built their own court. Every two years, the gymnasium organized public exercises for 600 students, during which volleyball was also played. The gymnasium students also formed the basis of the Prievidza men's team, which was established in 1932.

=== 2012–2017: Promotion to the First League ===
In the 2012/2013 season, VK Prievidza earned promotion to the Slovak Men's Volleyball League after winning the play-off tournament. In the 2014/2015 season, they achieved a historic 3rd place. After finishing 3rd place, the club qualified to the 16th finals of the CEV Cup, where they drew with 7-time champions of Spain, CV Teruel. Prievidza would not win a single set against the Spanish favorites, and would be subsequently knocked out of the competition. In the CEV Challenge Cup, the club would draw against Ethnikos Alexandroupolis, losing against them on sets. In the 2016/2017 season, they finished runner-up in the Slovak Championship after losing in the play-off finals to VKP Bystrina SPU Nitra.

=== 2018–2019: Most successful years ===
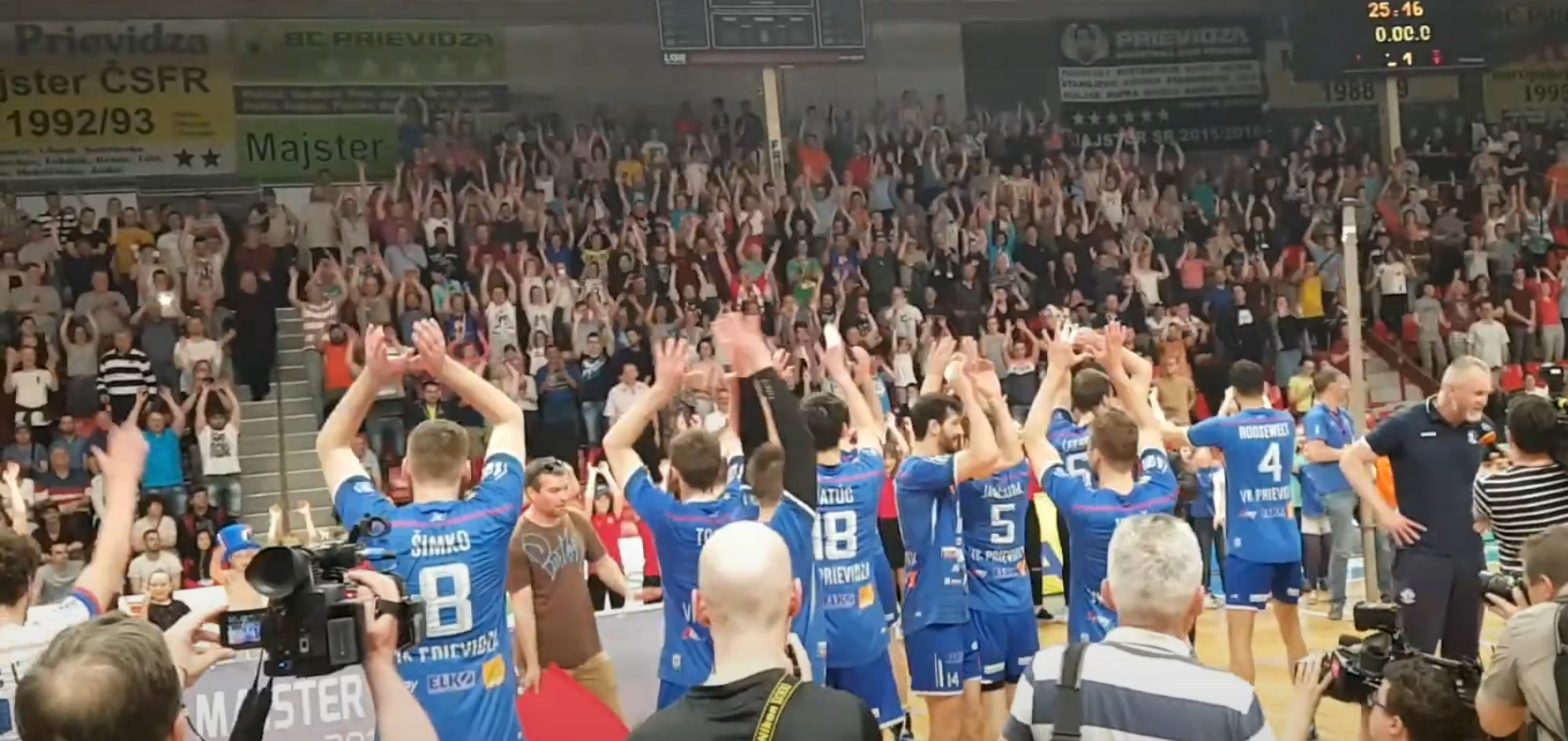
Prievidza players celebrating winning the title with their fans.

In the 2017/2018 season, VK Prievidza won its first ever Slovak Volleyball Cup, beating Svidník in the final. That same season, the club won their first ever title in the top division, beating Nitra 4–3 in the final leg. In the 2018/2019 season, Prievidza won the league title for the second time in a row, beating VK KDS Šport Košice in all sets to claim the trophy.

== Stadium ==
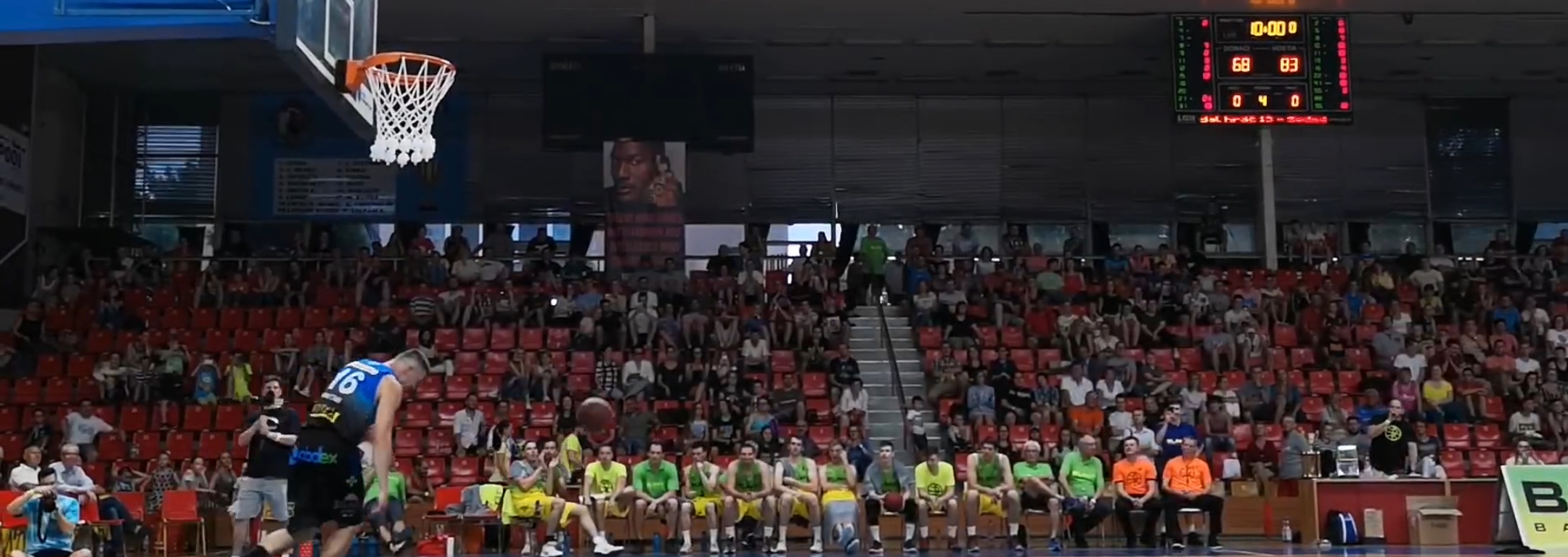
Stands in the stadium.

The Niké Aréna (also known as Športová hala Prievidza) is an indoor arena located in Prievidza, Slovakia. It is used as a sports arena, and is the current home of VK Prievidza and basketball club BC Prievidza. The arena has a capacity of 3,400 spectators. The arena is named after the Slovak bookmaker Niké.

== Honors ==
=== Domestic ===
- Slovak Men's Volleyball League
  - Winners (2): 2018, 2019
  - Runners-up (1): 2017
  - 3rd place (1): 2015
- Slovak Men's Volleyball Cup
  - Winners (2): 2018, 2020

=== European ===
- CEV Cup
  - 16th finals: 2015
- CEV Challenge Cup
  - 16th finals: 2015
