= National University of Catamarca =

University in Catamarca, Argentina

- Universidad Nacional de Catamarca
- Type: Public
- Established: 1972
- Academic staff: 1,209
- Administrative staff: 13,199
- Location: Catamarca, Catamarca, Argentina
- Website: http://www.unca.edu.ar/

The National University of Catamarca (Spanish: Universidad Nacional de Catamarca, UNCA) is an Argentine national university, situated in the city of Catamarca, Catamarca Province. It was founded by Law 19,831 of September 12, 1972

== See also ==
- University of Catamarca Museum: Museo Integral de la Reserva de Biosfera de Laguna Blanca
- Science and Education in Argentina
- Argentine Higher Education Official Site
- Argentine Universities
