= European Universities Beach Volleyball Championships =

European Universities Beach Volleyball Championships were the first organized in 2004. Apart from 2014, they have been organized annually.

The European Universities Beach Volleyball Championships are coordinated by the European University Sports Association along with the 18 other sports on the program of the European universities championships.

== Overview ==
Overview of European Universities Beach Volleyball Championships
| | Location | Nb of countries | Nb of teams | Nb of participants | Men | | | Women | | |
| | | | | | Winner | Finalist | Bronze Medallist | Winner | Finalist | Bronze Medallist |
| 2004 | Klagenfurt Austria | 11 | 27 | * | University of Bayreuth Germany | University of Ljubljana Slovenia | University of Klagenfurt Austria | Academy of Physical Education and Sport Gdansk Poland | University of Vienna Austria | University of Jena Germany |
| 2005 | Portorož Slovenia | 14 | 39 | * | University of Primorska Slovenia | University of Ljubljana Slovenia | University of Ljubljana II Slovenia | University of J.E. Purkyne Czech Republic | LMU Munich Germany | Technical University of Dresden Germany |
| 2006 | Latina Italy | 17 | 39 | 100 | University of Grenada Spain | Humboldt University of Berlin Germany | University of Tübingen Germany | Humboldt University of Berlin Germany | University of Ljubljana Slovenia | Technical University of Gliwice Poland |
| 2007 | Valencia Spain | 18 | 41 | 120 | University of Klagenfurt Austria | University of Berlin Germany | University of Malaga Spain | University of Cologne Germany | University of Vienna Austria | Catholic University of Murcia Spain |
| 2008 | Antalya Turkey | 15 | 34 | 88 | Transcarpathian University Ukraine | University of Brno Czech Republic | University of Klagenfurt Austria | Estonian Business School Estonia | Estonian Business School Estonia | University of Ljubljana Slovenia |
| 2009 | Gdynia Poland | 13 | 26 | 76 | University of Lodz Poland | University of Rostock Germany | Malaga University Spain | Estonian Business School Estonia | Estonian Business School Estonia | Malaga University Spain |
| 2010 | Kazan Russia | 9 | 27 | 72 | University of Lodz Poland | Technical Federal Institute Zurich ETH Switzerland | University of Bern Switzerland | Moscow Institute of Business and Law Russia | University of Potsdam Germany | Graduate School of Finance and Management in Bialystok Poland |
| 2011 | Malaga Spain | 14 | 43 | 103 | University of Lodz 1 Poland | University of Malaga 1 Spain | Polytechnic Institute of Porto Portugal | San Antonio C.U. Spain | University of Vienna 1 Austria | University of Vienna 2 Austria |
| 2012 | European Universities Games Cordoba Spain | 14 | 31 | * | University of Alicante Spain | University of Lodz Poland | University of Malaga Spain | University of Economics Prague Czech Republic | Warsaw University of Technology Poland | Jerzy Kukuczka Academy of Physical Education in Katowice Poland |
| 2013 | Oporto Portugal | 17 | 43 | 150 | University of Lodz 1 Poland | University of Lodz 2 Poland | Kiel University Germany | University of Fernando Pessoa Portugal | Jerzy Kukuczka Academy of Physical Education in Katowice Poland | University of Hamburg Germany |
| 2014 | Rotterdam Netherlands | Not attributed | | | | | | | | |
| 2015 | Larnaca Cyprus | * | * | * | * | * | * | * | * | * |
| 2016 | EUG, Zagreb&Rijeka Croatia | * | * | * | * | * | * | * | * | * |
| 2017 | Split Croatia | * | * | * | * | * | * | * | * | * |
| 2018 | EUG, Coimbra?? Portugal | * | * | * | * | * | * | * | * | * |
