= VK Spartak UJS Komárno =

- Full name: Volejbalový klub Spartak UJS Komárno
- Ground: Mestská športová hala Komárno (Capacity: 1500)
- Chairman: Ladislav Ferencz
- Manager: Richard Vlkolinský
- League: Niké Extraliga
- 2024–25: 2nd
- Website: Club home page

Uniforms
Home	Away

VK Spartak UJS Komárno is a professional volleyball club based in Komárno, Slovakia. It has been playing in the Niké Extraliga since 2013. The abbreviation UJS in the club's name stands for J. Selye University which has had a partnership with the club since 2016.

== Team roster ==
As of 17 December 2025

VK Spartak UJS Komárno
Number	Name	Position	Nationality	Year of birth
1	Matúš Krajčo	Libero	(Slovakia)	1998
3	Emanuel Kohút	Middle hitter	(Slovakia)	1982
4	Branislav Hanúsek	Middle hitter	(Slovakia)	2003
5	Simon Pati–Nagy	Libero	(Slovakia)	2003
7	Maroš Kasperkevič	Outside hitter	(Slovakia)	1993
8	Máté Lévay	Outside hitter	(Slovakia)	2003
9	Peter Mlynarčík	Opposite hitter	(Slovakia)	1999
11	Marek Gergely	Setter	(Slovakia)	1999
12	Balázs Forró	Middle hitter	(Slovakia)	1999
13	János Sánta	Opposite hitter/setter	(Slovakia)	2001
14	Ádám Százvai	Opposite hitter	(Slovakia)	1998
15	Jeff Lam	Setter	(Canada)	1999
17	František Ogurčák	Wing-spiker	(Slovakia)	1984
18	Patrik Kudra	Outside hitter	(Slovakia)	2003
19	Filip Mačuha	Middle hitter	(Slovakia)	1999

Head coach: Richard Vlkolinský

== Honours ==
- Niké Extraliga
  - Winners (3): 2020–21, 2021–22, 2023–24
  - Runners-up (1): 2014–15
- Slovak Volleyball Cup
  - Winners (2): 2014–15, 2021–22
  - Runners-up (2): 2022–23, 2023–24

== See also ==
- Slovakia Men's Volleyball League
- Slovakia men's national volleyball team
