= Slovak Men's Volleyball League =

Volleyball league in Slovakia

Volejbalová extraliga mužov
- Sport: Volleyball
- Founded: 1992
- No. of teams: 10
- Country: Slovakia
- Most recent champion: VK Spartak UJS Komárno (4th title)
- Most titles: VK Slovan Bratislava (13 titles)

Slovak Men's Volleyball League (Slovak: Volejbalová extraliga mužov) is the top-level men's volleyball league in Slovakia. The current champion (as of 2025) is VK Slovan Bratislava after winning in the final series against VK Spartak UJS Komárno. Until 1998, the competition was called the I. liga. It is organized by the Slovak Volleyball Federation (SVF). The most successful team is VKP Bratislava, which has won it 13 times. Since the 2021/22 season, the competition has been called the Niké Extraliga men.

== Champions ==
| Season | Champions | Runners-up | 3rd position |
|---|---|---|---|
| 1992/93 | VKP Bratislava (1) | VKM Žilina | VŠK Púchov |
| 1993/94 | VKP Bratislava (2) | VKM Žilina | VŠK Púchov |
| 1994/95 | VKP Bratislava (3) | O-BRAINN Žilina | PPS Detva |
| 1995/96 | VKP Bratislava (4) | Stavbár Žilina | Matador Púchov |
| 1996/97 | VKP Bratislava (5) | Matador Púchov | Stavbár Žilina |
| 1997/98 | Nafta VKP Bratislava (6) | Matador Púchov | Petrochema Dubová |
| 1998/99 | VKP Bratislava (7) | Matador Púchov | Stavbár Žilina |
| 1999/00 | Matador Púchov (1) | Petrochema Dubová | VO TJ Spartak Myjava |
| 2000/01 | Petrochema Dubová (1) | Matador Púchov | VO TJ Spartak Myjava |
| 2001/02 | Matador Púchov (2) | Petrochema Dubová | VKP Bratislava |
| 2002/03 | Matador Púchov (3) | VKP Bratislava | Petrochema Dubová |
| 2003/04 | VKP Bratislava (8) | Matador Púchov | Slávia VK PU Prešov |
| 2004/05 | Slávia VK PU Prešov (1) | VKP Bratislava | Cityfarma Nové Mesto nad Váhom |
| 2005/06 | VKP Bratislava (9) | VK Chemes Humenné | Cityfarma Nové Mesto nad Váhom |
| 2006/07 | Cityfarma Nové Mesto nad Váhom (1) | VKP Bratislava | VK Chemes Humenné |
| 2007/08 | VK Chemes Humenné (1) | VK Nové Mesto nad Váhom | VKP Bratislava |
| 2008/09 | VKP Bratislava (10) | VK Chemes Humenné | VK Nové Mesto nad Váhom |
| 2009/10 | VK Chemes Humenné (2) | Slávia VK PU Prešov | VKP Bratislava |
| 2010/11 | VKP Bratislava (11) | VK Chemes Humenné | VK Slávia Svidník |
| 2011/12 | VK Chemes Humenné (3) | Volley Team UNICEF Bratislava | VKP Bratislava |
| 2012/13 | Volley Team UNICEF Bratislava (1) | VK Chemes Humenné | Legend Watches Slávia Svidník |
| 2013/14 | VK Chemes Humenné (4) | VK Slávia Svidník | Spartak VKP Myjava |
| 2014/15 | VK Mirad UNIPO Prešov (2) | VK Spartak UJS Komárno | VK Prievidza |
| 2015/16 | VK Bystrina SPU Nitra (1) | VK Mirad PU Prešov | VK KDS Šport Košice |
| 2016/17 | VK Bystrina SPU Nitra (2) | VK Prievidza | VK Mirad PU Prešov |
| 2017/18 | VK Prievidza (1) | VK Bystrina SPU Nitra | TJ Slávia Svidník |
| 2018/19 | VK Prievidza (2) | VK KDS Šport Košice | VK Bystrina SPU Nitra |
| 2020/21 | VK Spartak UJS Komárno (1) | TJ Spartak Myjava | VK Mirad UNIPO Prešov |
| 2021/22 | VK Spartak UJS Komárno (2) | VK Mirad UNIPO Prešov | TJ Spartak Myjava |
| 2022/23 | VKP Bratislava (12) | VK Mirad UNIPO Prešov | TJ Spartak Myjava |
| 2023/24 | VK Spartak UJS Komárno (3) | VKP Bratislava | TJ Spartak Myjava |
| 2024/25 | VK Slovan Bratislava (13) | VK Spartak UJS Komárno | VK Slávia SPU Nitra |
| 2025/26 | VK Spartak UJS Komárno (4) | VK Slovan Bratislava | VK Slávia SPU Nitra |
