= VK Slovan Bratislava =

Slovak volleyball club

- Logo used as of 2025
- Full name: Volejbalový Klub Slovan Bratislava
- Short name: VK Slovan Bratislava
- Founded: 1946
- Ground: Športová hala VKP (Capacity: 1,500)
- League: Slovak Extraliga
- 2024-25: Winners
- Website: Club home page

VK Slovan Bratislava is a Slovak volleyball team based in Bratislava, founded in 1946. VKP are considered the most successful club in Slovakia, having won the Slovak League 11 times, the Czechoslovak League three times and the Slovak Cup 7 times.

In 2025, the club completely re-branded itself, changing its name from VKP Bratislava to VK Slovan Bratislava. They also changed their club logo.

== History ==
=== 1946–1948: Early years ===
The predecessor of the great Červenka, the National Security Sports Club, was founded in February 1946 at the founding meeting. The club was based on the former ŠK Bratislava field in Petržalka. The club had several sports sections, and one of the founding ones was the volleyball section. In 1948, TKNB was renamed Sokol ZNB Bratislava. From that year, one men's team regularly participated in the Czechoslovak championships. It took third to fifth place in the competition and was the permanent champion of Slovakia. In the 1949/50 season, the team played under the banner of Štátna banka. Three years later, another name change came to DŠO ČH Bratislava. In the 1953/54 and 1959/60 seasons, ČH played in the first national league, but it never managed to stay in the competition.

=== 1990–present: Success in the league ===
In 1990, the name was changed to ŠKP Bratislava and in 1992 to VKP Bratislava, when new club statutes were approved. In 2012, the club merged with Spartak Myjava and created a team called Spartak VKP Myjava. After a short hiatus in Komárno and Nitra, the club returned to Bratislava after nine years to restore the traditionally successful club. Since the 2021/2022 season, the club has also expanded to include a women's team, making it the only Slovak volleyball club to have both a men's and a women's team in the extra league. In 2025, VKP Bratislava changed its name to VK Slovan Bratislava, also changing its logo. That same year, the club won its 13th title, beating Rieker UJS Komárno in all sets.

== Club names ==
- TKNB Bratislava (1946—1948)
- Sokol ZNB Bratislava (1948—1949)
- Štátna Banka Bratislava (1949—1953)
- DŠO ČH Bratislava (1953—1954)
- ČH Bratislava (1954—1990)
- ŠKP Bratislava (1990—1992)
- VKP Bratislava (1992—2012)
- VKP Spartak Myjava (2012—2014)
- VKP Spartak Komárno (2014—2016)
- VKP Bystrina SPU Nitra (2016—2020)
- VKP Bratislava (2020–2025)
- VK Slovan Bratislava (2025–present)

== Honors ==
=== Czechoslovak Men's Volleyball Championship ===
- Winners (3): 1978, 1979, 1981

=== Slovak Men's Volleyball League ===
- Winners (11): 1992/93, 1993/94, 1994/95, 1995/96, 1997/98, 1998/99, 2003/04, 2005/06, 2008/09, 2010/11, 2005/06
- Runners-up (3): 2002/03, 2004/05, 2006/07
- 3rd place (4): 2001/02, 2007/08, 2009/10, 2011/12

=== Slovak Men’s Volleyball Cup ===
- Winners (7): 1993, 1994, 1995, 1996, 2007, 2008, 2010

=== Czechoslovak Cup ===
- Runners-up (1): 2010

== See also ==
- Slovakia Men's Volleyball League
- Slovakia men's national volleyball team
