= Mohammad Mousavi (volleyball) =

Iranian volleyball player

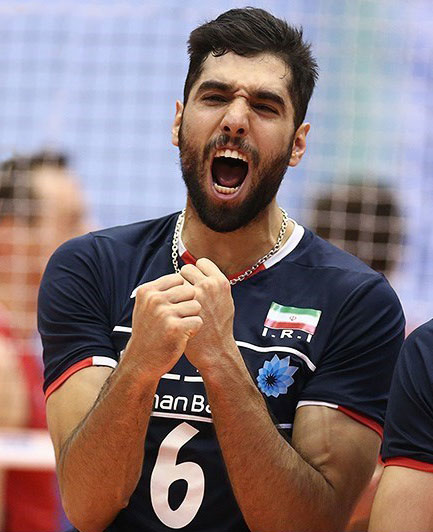
- Mousavi after a victory against the United States national team – June 2015

Personal information
- Full name: Seyed Mohammad Mousavi Eraghi
- Born: 22 August 1987 (age 39); Dezful, Iran
- Height: 200 cm (6 ft 7 in)
- Weight: 95 kg (209 lb)
- Spike: 362 cm (143 in)

Volleyball information
- Position: Middle blocker
- Current club: (Iran) Foolad Sirjan
- Number: 6

Career
Years	Teams
2004–2005; 2005–2006; 2006–2011; 2011–2012; 2012–2013; 2013–2014; 2014–2015; 2015–2018; 2018–2019; 2019–2020; 2020; 2020–2021; 2021–2022; 2022–2023; 2023–2024	(Iran) Looleh Sazi Ahwaz (Iran) Petrochimi Bandar Imam (Iran) Paykan Tehran (Iran) Giti Pasand Isfahan (Iran) Kalleh Mazandaran (Iran) Matin Varamin (Iran) Paykan Tehran (Iran) Sarmayeh Bank Tehran (Iran) Shahrdari Urmia (Poland) AZS Olsztyn (Iran) Saipa Tehran (Italy) Gas Sales Piacenza (Turkey) Fenerbahçe (Iran) Nian Electronic (Iran) Foolad Sirjan

National team
2005–2006; 2004–2007; 2007–2024	Iran U19; Iran U21; Iran
Honours
Representing Iran
Men's volleyball
World Grand Champions Cup
Bronze medal – third place	2017 Japan
Asian Championship
Gold medal – first place	2011 Tehran
Gold medal – first place	2013 Dubai
Gold medal – first place	2019 Tehran
Gold medal – first place	2021 Chiba
Silver medal – second place	2009 Manila
Silver medal – second place	2023 Urmia
Asian Games
Gold medal – first place	2014 Incheon
Gold medal – first place	2018 Jakarta–Palembang
Gold medal – first place	2022 Hangzhou	Team
Silver medal – second place	2010 Guangzhou
Asian Cup
Gold medal – first place	2008 Nakhon Ratchasima
Gold medal – first place	2010 Urmia

Seyed Mohammad Mousavi Eraghi (Persian: سید محمد موسوی عراقی, born 22 August 1987 in Dezful) is an Iranian volleyball player, who plays as a middle blocker for the Iran men's national volleyball team.

== Name ==
His family is originally from Arak and because in the past the city's name was "Eragh-e Ajam" (meaning Persian Iraq, or non-Arab Iraq) his family name is followed by "Eraghi" (Iraqi).

== Career ==
=== National team ===
Mousavi was invited to national team in 2008. He was named Best Blocker at the 2008 Olympic Qualification Tournament, where Iran ended up on sixth place and missed qualification for the 2008 Summer Olympics in Beijing, China. He was named twice the Best Blocker in Asian Championship. He made a brilliant performance in 2013 World League and was named Best Middle Blocker in 2015 World Cup.

=== Clubs ===
He started his career in volleyball club Louleh Sazi Ahvaz. He played for Petrochimi Bandar Imam, Paykan Tehran, Giti Pasand Isfahan, Kalleh Mazandaran, Matin Vatamin. Mousavi has won eleven championships while playing for five teams in Iranian Super League. He has received offers to play for some of the world’s leading teams, including Al Arabi of Qatar and an unnamed Italian Serie A club but decided to play in Iranian League. He was named the Best Blocker in 2010 Club World Championship with Paykan. He played for three years in Sarmayeh Bank until 2018. Mousavi joined Indykpol AZS Olsztyn in September 2019. Mohammad Mousavi has been named as the best blocker of the PlusLiga season.

== Sporting achievements ==
- FIVB Club World Championship
  - Qatar 2010 – with Paykan Tehran
- FIVB Club World Championship
  - 2024Brazil – with Foolad Sirjan VC
- AVC Asian Club Championship
  - Bahrain 2007 – with Paykan Tehran
  - Kazakhstan 2008 – with Paykan Tehran
  - United Arab Emirates 2009 – with Paykan Tehran
  - China 2010 – with Paykan Tehran
  - Iran 2013 – with Kalleh Mazandaran
  - Philippines 2014 – with Matin Varamin
  - Chinese Taipei 2015 – with Paykan Tehran
  - Myanmar 2016 – with Paykan Tehran
  - Vietnam 2017 – with Sarmayeh Bank Tehran
- National championships
  - 2006/2007 Iranian Championship, with Paykan Tehran
  - 2007/2008 Iranian Championship, with Paykan Tehran
  - 2008/2009 Iranian Championship, with Paykan Tehran
  - 2009/2010 Iranian Championship, with Paykan Tehran
  - 2010/2011 Iranian Championship, with Paykan Tehran
  - 2012/2013 Iranian Championship, with Kalleh Mazandaran
  - 2013/2014 Iranian Championship, with Matin Varamin
  - 2014/2015 Iranian Championship, with Paykan Tehran
  - 2015/2016 Iranian Championship, with Sarmayeh Bank Tehran
  - 2016/2017 Iranian Championship, with Sarmayeh Bank Tehran
  - 2017/2018 Iranian Championship, with Sarmayeh Bank Tehran
- National team
  - 2004 AVC Asian U21 Championship
  - 2005 AVC Asian U19 Championship
  - 2006 AVC Asian U21 Championship
  - 2007 FIVB U21 World Championship
  - 2008 AVC Asian Cup
  - 2009 AVC Asian Championship
  - 2010 AVC Asian Cup
  - 2010 Asian Games
  - 2011 AVC Asian Championship
  - 2013 AVC Asian Championship
  - 2014 Asian Games
  - 2017 FIVB World Grand Champions Cup
  - 2018 Asian Games
  - 2019 AVC Asian Championship
  - 2021 AVC Asian Championship
  - 2023 AVC Asian Championship

=== Individually ===
- Best spiker: 2005 U19 World Championship
- Best blocker: 2006 Asian U21 Championship
- Best blocker: 2007 Asian Club Championship
- Best blocker: 2008 3rd World Olympic Qualification Tournament
- Best blocker: 2009 Asian Championship
- Best blocker: 2010 Club World Championship
- Best blocker: 2013 Asian Club Championship
- Best blocker: 2013 Asian Championship
- Best middle blocker: 2014 Asian Club Championship
- Best middle blocker: 2015 World Cup
- Best middle blocker: 2016 1st World Olympic Qualification Tournament
- Best middle blocker: 2016 Asian Club Championship
- Best middle blocker: 2017 Asian Club Championship
- Best middle blocker: 2019 Asian Championship

Awards
Preceded by (Poland) Marcin Możdżonek	Best Middle Blocker of FIVB World Cup; 2015 ex aequo (Argentina) Sebastián Sole	Succeeded by (United States) Maxwell Holt (Brazil) Lucas Saatkamp
