= 2011–12 Iranian Volleyball Super League =

Locations of the 2011–12 season teams

The Iranian Volleyball Super League 2011–12 was the 25th season of the Iranian Volleyball Super League, the highest professional volleyball league in Iran. The season started on 19 October 2011 and ended on 19 March 2012.

== Regular season ==
=== Standings ===
Rank	Team	Pts	Matches			Details						Sets		
Rank	Team	Pts	Pld	W	L	3–0	3–1	3–2	2–3	1–3	0–3	W	L	Ratio
1	Saipa Alborz	64	26	23	3	12	5	6	1	1	1	72	26	2.769
2	Kalleh Mazandaran	63	26	22	4	10	6	6	3	0	1	72	30	2.400
3	Paykan Tehran	62	26	21	5	6	12	3	2	0	3	67	33	2.030
4	Shahrdari Urmia	53	25	16	9	9	7	0	5	3	1	61	34	1.794
5	Giti Pasand Isfahan	46	26	16	10	9	3	4	2	5	3	57	41	1.390
6	Pishgaman Kavir Yazd	45	26	16	10	7	4	5	2	4	4	56	44	1.273
7	Havash Gonbad	43	26	13	13	6	5	2	6	4	3	55	48	1.146
8	Barij Essence Kashan	39	26	15	11	5	2	8	2	5	4	54	51	1.059
9	Shahrdari Tabriz	39	26	12	14	5	6	1	4	3	7	47	50	0.940
10	Novin Keshavarz Tehran	28	26	9	17	4	3	2	3	7	7	40	58	0.690
11	Mizan Khorasan	25	26	9	17	2	4	3	1	10	6	39	61	0.639
12	Aluminium Al-Mahdi Hormozgan	17	25	5	20	1	2	2	4	7	9	30	66	0.455
13	Heyat Volleyball Kerman	11	26	3	23	0	2	1	3	7	13	22	73	0.301
14	Manategh Naftkhiz Jonoub	8	26	1	25	0	1	0	5	6	14	19	76	0.250

=== Results ===
	ALU	BRJ	SGP	HAV	HVK	KAL	NAF	MIZ	NOV	PAY	PSH	SAI	TAB	URM
Aluminium		2–3	2–3	0–3	1–3	0–3	3–2	2–3	1–3	2–3	0–3	1–3	3–1	0–3
Barij Essence	3–0		2–3	3–2	3–0	3–2	1–3	3–0	3–2	1–3	3–0	0–3	0–3	3–1
Giti Pasand	3–0	2–3		3–0	3–1	0–3	3–0	3–1	3–0	2–3	3–0	1–3	1–3	0–3
Havash Gonbad	1–3	3–1	2–3		3–1	3–2	3–1	3–1	3–0	3–2	2–3	2–3	3–0	3–0
HV Kerman	2–3	0–3	1–3	0–3		0–3	3–1	1–3	0–3	0–3	1–3	0–3	1–3	1–3
Kalleh	3–0	3–2	0–3	3–2	3–0		3–1	3–1	3–1	3–0	3–0	2–3	3–1	3–2
Manategh Naftkhiz	0–3	2–3	0–3	0–3	2–3	0–3		2–3	1–3	0–3	2–3	0–3	1–3	1–3
Mizan	3–1	3–1	3–1	1–3	3–2	1–3	3–0		3–0	1–3	2–3	1–3	1–3	0–3
Novin Keshavarz	3–1	1–3	0–3	3–0	3–2	0–3	3–0	3–0		0–3	2–3	3–2	2–3	1–3
Paykan	3–1	3–1	3–1	3–1	3–0	2–3	3–0	3–1	3–1		3–2	0–3	3–1	3–1
Pishgaman	3–0	2–3	3–1	3–1	3–0	0–3	3–0	3–0	3–1	1–3		3–0	3–0	1–3
Saipa	3–0	3–0	3–0	3–2	3–0	1–3	3–0	3–0	3–1	3–0	3–1		3–0	3–2
Shahrdari Tabriz	3–1	2–3	0–3	3–0	3–0	2–3	3–0	3–1	3–0	0–3	2–3	2–3		0–3
Shahrdari Urmia	X	3–0	2–3	3–1	3–0	2–3	3–0	3–0	3–1	1–3	3–1	2–3	3–0	

- The match between Shahrdari Urmia and Aluminium Al-Mahdi Hormozgan did not take place.

== Playoffs ==
Semifinals
1	Saipa	3	3	—
4	Shahrdari Urmia	2	0	—
2	Kalleh	2	3	3
3	Paykan	3	1	1

Final
1	Saipa	3	0	0
2	Kalleh	1	3	3
3rd place
4	Shahrdari Urmia	3	1	X
3	Paykan	1	3	X

=== Semifinals ===
Saipa vs. Shahrdari Urmia

Date		Score		Set 1	Set 2	Set 3	Set 4	Set 5	Total
04 Mar	Saipa Alborz	3–2	Shahrdari Urmia	25–16	26–28	25–21	24–26	15–11	115–102
07 Mar	Shahrdari Urmia	0–3	Saipa Alborz	16–25	18–25	22–25			56–75

Kalleh vs. Paykan

Date		Score		Set 1	Set 2	Set 3	Set 4	Set 5	Total
04 Mar	Kalleh Mazandaran	2–3	Paykan Tehran	20–25	24–26	25–21	25–21	8–15	102–108
07 Mar	Paykan Tehran	1–3	Kalleh Mazandaran	21–25	25–21	13–25	20–25		79–96
11 Mar	Kalleh Mazandaran	3–1	Paykan Tehran	22–25	25–23	25–19	25–23		97–90

=== 3rd place ===
Shahrdari Urmia vs. Paykan

Date		Score		Set 1	Set 2	Set 3	Set 4	Set 5	Total
14 Mar	Paykan Tehran	1–3	Shahrdari Urmia	21–25	25–22	20–25	21–25		87–97
17 Mar	Shahrdari Urmia	1–3	Paykan Tehran	20–25	25–20	15–25	19–25		79–95
19 Mar	Paykan Tehran	–	Shahrdari Urmia						Canceled

- Paykan and Shahrdari Urmia shared the third place.

=== Final ===
Saipa vs. Kalleh

Date		Score		Set 1	Set 2	Set 3	Set 4	Set 5	Total
14 Mar	Saipa Alborz	3–1	Kalleh Mazandaran	25–20	25–18	17–25	25–23		92–86
17 Mar	Kalleh Mazandaran	3–0	Saipa Alborz	25–14	25–13	25–20			75–47
19 Mar	Saipa Alborz	0–3	Kalleh Mazandaran	20–25	18–25	15–25			53–75

== Final standings ==
Rank	Team	Qualification or relegation
1	Kalleh Mazandaran	2012 Asian Club Championship
2	Saipa Alborz	
3	Paykan Tehran	
3	Shahrdari Urmia	
5	Giti Pasand Isfahan	
6	Pishgaman Kavir Yazd	
7	Havash Gonbad	
8	Barij Essence Kashan	
9	Shahrdari Tabriz	
10	Novin Keshavarz Tehran	
11	Mizan Khorasan	
12	Aluminium Al-Mahdi Hormozgan	
13	Heyat Volleyball Kerman	Relegation to the first division
14	Manategh Naftkhiz Jonoub	Relegation to the first division
