= Moein Rahimi =

Iranian volleyball player (born 1989)

Personal information
- Nationality: Iranian
- Born: 2 May 1989 (age 37); Oroumieh, Iran
- Height: 2 m (6 ft 7 in)
- Weight: 100 kg (220 lb)
- Spike: 368 cm (145 in)
- Block: 358 cm (141 in)

Volleyball information
- Position: Middle blocker

Career
Years	Teams
2006-07; 2007-08; 2008-09; 2009-10; 2010-11; 2001-12; 2012-13; 2013-16; 2016-17; 2016-17; 2017-19	Azarpayam Urmia; Pegah Urmia; Erteashat Sanati; BEEM Babol; Saipa Tehran; Bank Keshavarzi; Barij Essence; Aluminium Hormozgan; Ardakan Yazd; Shahrdari Tabriz; Shahrdari Urmia

National team
Iran men's national volleyball team
Honours
Representing Iran
Men's volleyball
World U19 Championships
Gold medal – first place	2007 Mexico	Team
Asian U19 Championship
Gold medal – first place	2008 Sri Lanka	Team
Gold medal – first place	2007 Malaysia	Team
WMC Volleyball Championships
Bronze medal – third place	2012 Brazil	Team
Gold medal – first place	2009 Tehran	Team

Moein Rahimi (Persian: معین رحیمی; born 2 May 1989) is an Iranian volleyball player and former member of Iran men's national volleyball team.

He has 12 years of experience playing in the Iranian Volleyball Super League and playing in teams such as Azarpayam, Shahrdari Urmia, and Saipa Tehran.

== Sporting career ==
=== National ===
- World U19 Championships
  - Gold: Baja California, Mexico, 2007
- Asian U19 Championships
  - Gold: Kuala Lumpur, Malaysia, 2007
  - Gold: Colombo, Sri Lanka, 2008
- World Military Volleyball Championships (CISM)
  - Gold: Tehran, Iran, 2009
  - Bronze: Rio de Janeiro, Brazil, 2012

=== Club ===
- Runner-up: Saipa Karaj, 2009–2010
- Third place: Pegah Urmia, 2007–2008
- Third place: BEEM Mazandaran, 2008–2009
