= Saeid Marouf =

Iranian volleyball player

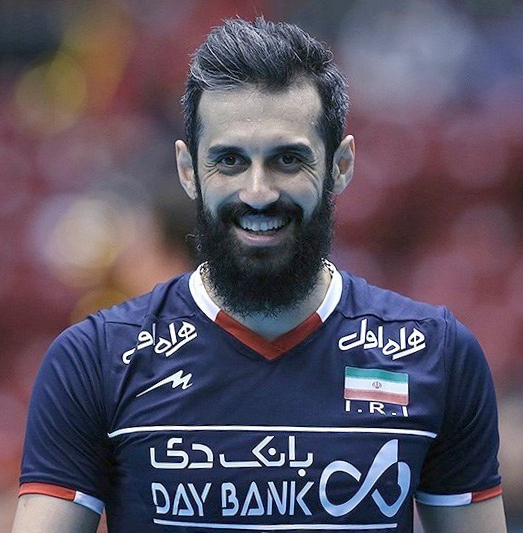
- Marouf in 2016

Personal information
- Full name: Mir Saeid Marouf Lakrani
- Nickname: Rish Jaduyi (Magic Beard); Shahzadeh Irani (Prince of Persia)
- Born: 20 October 1985 (age 41); Urmia, Iran
- Height: 1.89 m (6 ft 2 in)
- Weight: 81 kg (179 lb)
- Spike: 331 cm (130 in)
- Block: 311 cm (122 in)

Volleyball information
- Position: Setter
- Number: 4

Career
Years	Teams
2003–2004; 2004–2006; 2006–2007; 2007–2010; 2010–2011; 2011–2012; 2012–2013; 2013–2014; 2014; 2014–2015; 2015–2016; 2016–2018; 2018–2019; 2019–2021; 2022–2023; 2023; 2023–2024	(Iran) Pegah Urmia (Iran) Sanam Tehran (Iran) Esteghlal Gonbad (Iran) Saipa Tehran (Iran) Damash Gilan (Iran) Kalleh Mazandaran (Iran) Shahrdari Urmia (Iran) Matin Varamin (Iran) Shahrdari Urmia (Russia) Zenit Kazan (Iran) Shahrdari Urmia (Iran) Paykan Tehran (Italy) Emma Villas Siena (China) Beijing BAIC Motor (Turkey) Fenerbahçe Istanbul (Iran) Paykan Tehran (Iran) Shahdab Yazd

National team
2002–2003; 2003–2005; 2005–2021	Iran U19; Iran U21; Iran
Honours
Representing Iran
Men's volleyball
World Grand Champions Cup
Bronze medal – third place	2017 Japan	Team
Asian Championship
Gold medal – first place	2013 Dubai	Team
Gold medal – first place	2019 Tehran	Team
Silver medal – second place	2009 Manila	Team
Asian Games
Gold medal – first place	2014 Incheon	Team
Gold medal – first place	2018 Jakarta–Palembang	Team
Silver medal – second place	2010 Guangzhou	Team
Asian Cup
Gold medal – first place	2008 Nakhon Ratchasima	Team
Gold medal – first place	2010 Urmia	Team

Mir Saeid Marouf Lakerani (Persian: میرسعید معروف لاكرانی; born 20 October 1985) is an Iranian volleyball setter. He was the captain of the Iranian national team. He was named best setter at the 2014 World League and 2008, 2012 and 2016 Olympic qualifying tournaments, as well as most valuable player at the 2013 Asian Championship. He participated in the Rio 2016 and Tokyo 2020 Olympics. He was voted Iranian Sportsmen of the year for (2015–16) of the Iranian calendar by an Iranian

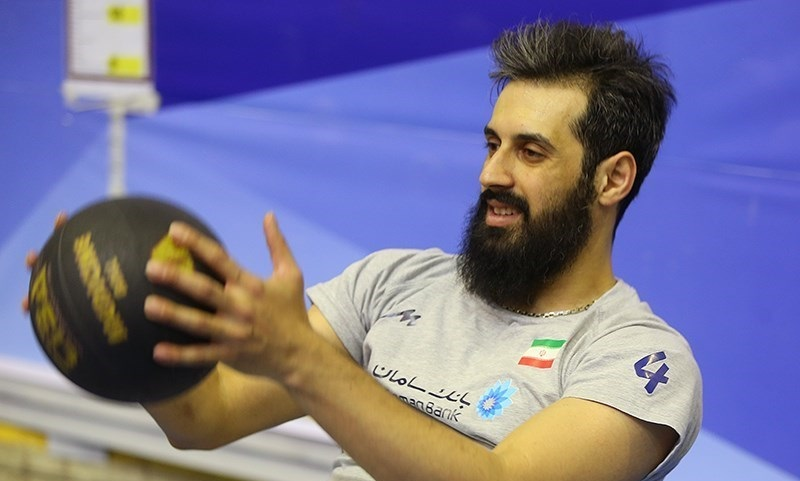
Practice with Medicine ball

== Career ==
=== National team ===
Marouf's first national game was for Iran boys national volleyball team in 2001 and 4 years later, he joined the Iran men's national volleyball team. In 2007, Marouf became a constant member of men's national team but due to conflicts and disagreements, Marouf decided not to continue playing for men's national team in 2011 but he ultimately returned to team in 2012 and since former captain Alireza Nadi was not invited to the team by then-head coach Julio Velasco, Marouf became the team captain ever since. Marouf In the 2013 Asian Men's Volleyball Championship was selected as the Most valuable player. He was introduced as the Best setter in at 2014 FIVB World League above Bruno Rezende and Dragan Travica.

=== Clubs in Iran ===
He started his career in his hometown volleyball club Urmia Moqavemat he has also played for Sanam Tehran, Shahrdari Urmia, Matin Varamin, Esteghlal Gonbad, Saipa Tehran, Damash Gilan, Kalleh Mazandaran. Marouf's first championship experience in Iranian Volleyball Super League was with Sanam Tehran and in 2011–2012 season he plays for Kalleh Mazandaran and he celebrates the Iranian Volleyball Super League championship with his team for the second time. He in 2014 Asian Men's Club Volleyball Championship tournament won the championship with Matin Varamin. in 2014 he signes a two-year contract with Shahrdari Urmia but halfway through the season he terminates the contract and subsequently joins the Zenit Kazan. Marouf in 2016 year join to Iran's most successful team Paykan Tehran.

=== Zenit Kazan ===
After years of speculation regarding his presence at a European club, on 27 December 2014 Marouf signed a one-year contract with Russian Super League champions Zenit Kazan with an option for a one-year extension. The contract was worth over 1 million dollars which made Marouf one of the world's highest-paid volleyball players in 2014 .

On 25 January 2015, Marouf made his debut in the Russian Super League for Zenit Kazan in a 3–0 straight-sets win over Dynamo Krasnodar.

=== Beijing BAIC Motor ===
Marouf after 2019 VNL transferred to Chinese Volleyball Super League for played in Beijing BAIC Motor.

== Personal life ==
Marouf was born in Urmia, West Azerbaijan, Iran in a family with a history of involvement in volleyball including his uncles Jahangir Seyyed Abbasi, Nobakht Seyyed Abbasi, Khoshbakht Seyyed Abbasi, and his former teammate Vahid Seyyed Abbasi.

In school, he participated in other sports, including Cross country running, Basketball and Handball.

=== Social activity ===
Marouf, along with popular athletes such as Ali Daei, Hamid Sourian and Behdad Salimi, acted as a helper in the fight to eradicate poverty and hunger in the World Food Programme.

== Honours ==
=== National team ===
- World Grand Champions Cup
  - Bronze medal (1): 2017
- Asian Championship
  - Gold medal (2): 2013, 2019
  - Silver medal (1): 2009
- Asian Games
  - Gold medal (2): 2014, 2018
  - Silver medal (1): 2010
- Asian Cup
  - Gold medal (2): 2008, 2010
- Asian U20 Championship
  - Silver medal (1): 2004
- U19 World Championship
  - Bronze medal (1): 2003
- Asian U18 Championship
  - Silver medal (1): 2003

=== Club ===
- European Champions League
  - Gold medal (1): 2015 (Zenit Kazan)
- Asian Championship
  - Gold medal (3): 2008, 2022 (Paykan Tehran), 2014 (Matin Varamin)
- Russian Super League
  - Champions (1): 2015 (Zenit Kazan)
- Iranian Super League
  - Champions (3): 2005 (Sanam Tehran), 2012 (Kalleh Mazandaran), 2014 (Matin Varamin)
- Chinese Super League
  - Champions (1): 2021 (Beijing BAIC Motor)

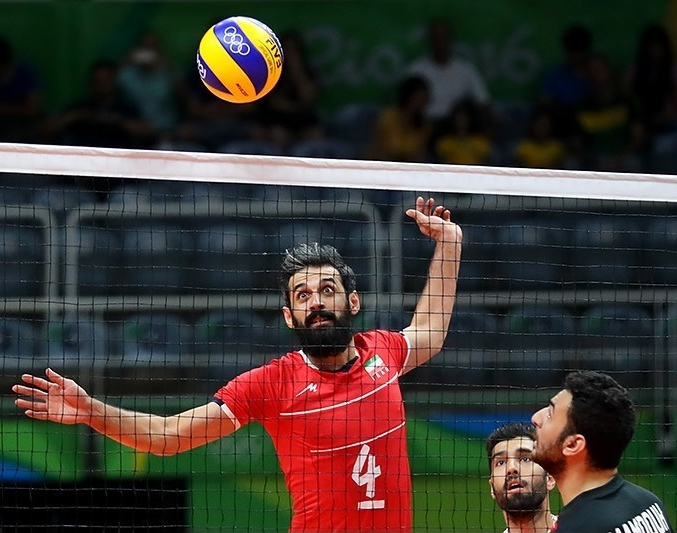
match between Iran and Egypt at the 2016 Summer Olympics

=== Individual ===
- Best setter: 2008 3rd World Olympic Qualification Tournament
- Most popular player: 2009 Asian Championship
- Best setter: 2010 Asian Cup
- Best setter: 2012 1st World Olympic Qualification Tournament
- Best setter: 2013 Asian Championship
- Most valuable player: 2013 Asian Championship
- Best setter: 2014 World League
- Iranian Sportsmen of the Year: 2014 (Media - ISNA)
- Iranian Sportsmen of the Year: 2015 (IRIB)
- Iran's Best Volleyball Player of the Year: 2014–15, 2016–17 (VLI)
- Best setter: 2016 1st World Olympic Qualification Tournament
- Best Asian Athlete of the Year: 2016 (Le Monde)
- Best Foreign Player: 2020–21 Chinese Super League

Awards
Preceded by (Brazil) Bruno Rezende	Best Setter of FIVB World League; 2014	Succeeded by (France) Benjamin Toniutti
