= 2019–20 Iranian Volleyball Super League =

Locations of the 2019–20 season teams

The Iranian Volleyball Super League 2019–20 was the 33rd season of the Iranian Volleyball Super League, the highest professional volleyball league in Iran. The season started on 30 October 2019, and ran through 23 February 2020. But due to COVID-19 pandemic in Iran, IRIVF announced on 1 March 2020 that the season was canceled. According to the announcement, there was no relegation to lower division and teams ranked 1st to 3rd in previous season were nominated to participate in the 2020 Asian Club Championship. However, the 2020 Asian Club Championship was also canceled later.

== Regular season ==
=== Standings ===
Rank	Team	Matches			Pts	Details						Sets		
Rank	Team	Pld	W	L	Pts	3–0	3–1	3–2	2–3	1–3	0–3	W	L	Ratio
1	Shahrdari Varamin	15	13	2	32	5	1	7	0	1	1	40	21	1.905
2	Saipa Tehran	16	12	4	35	4	5	3	2	2	0	42	23	1.826
3	Shahrdari Urmia	16	11	5	36	5	6	0	3	1	1	40	21	1.905
4	Foolad Sepahan	17	11	6	34	4	4	3	4	1	1	42	28	1.500
5	Kalleh Mazandaran	16	11	5	32	6	2	3	2	2	1	39	23	1.696
6	Paykan Tehran	15	9	6	29	4	4	1	3	2	1	35	24	1.458
7	Shahrdari Gonbad	16	9	7	24	3	3	3	0	2	5	29	30	0.967
8	Foolad Sirjan Iranian	15	6	9	20	2	3	1	3	5	1	29	32	0.906
9	Rahyab Melal Marivan	16	5	11	15	3	1	1	1	4	6	21	36	0.583
10	Shahdab Yazd	17	4	13	16	1	2	1	5	1	7	23	43	0.535
11	Khatam Ardakan	15	2	13	7	0	1	1	2	6	5	16	42	0.381
12	Shahrvand Arak	16	2	14	5	0	1	1	0	6	8	12	45	0.267
—	Payam Mashhad	–	–	–	–	–	–	–	–	–	–	–	–	–

- Payam Mashhad were excluded from the league during the regular season due to financial problems. All results were declared null and void.

=== Results ===
	FOE	FOI	KAL	KHA	PAY	RAH	SAI	SHD	GON	URM	VAR	SHV
Foolad Sepahan		3–1	3–2	3–1	X	3–0	3–1	X	2–3	1–3	2–3	X
Foolad Sirjan	3–2		X	X	3–1	2–3	1–3	X	X	1–3	2–3	3–0
Kalleh	3–2	3–0		3–0	3–2	X	X	3–2	3–0	X	0–3	3–0
Khatam	2–3	1–3	X		X	3–2	0–3	1–3	X	1–3	X	1–3
Paykan	2–3	3–1	1–3	3–0		X	X	3–0	3–1	X	2–3	3–0
Rahyab Melal	3–0	X	0–3	1–3	1–3		0–3	0–3	3–0	1–3	X	X
Saipa	1–3	X	3–1	X	2–3	3–1		2–3	3–1	3–2	3–0	3–1
Shahdab	0–3	1–3	0–3	3–1	X	0–3	2–3		0–3	0–3	X	2–3
Shahrdari Gonbad	0–3	3–1	X	3–0	X	X	X	3–2		3–2	3–1	3–0
Shahrdari Urmia	X	X	3–1	3–0	1–3	3–0	2–3	3–0	3–0		0–3	X
Shahrdari Varamin	X	3–2	3–2	3–2	3–0	3–0	X	3–2	3–0	X		3–1
Shahrvand Arak	0–3	0–3	1–3	X	0–3	1–3	0–3	X	1–3	1–3	X	
