= Alireza Behboudi =

Iranian volleyball player (born 1979)

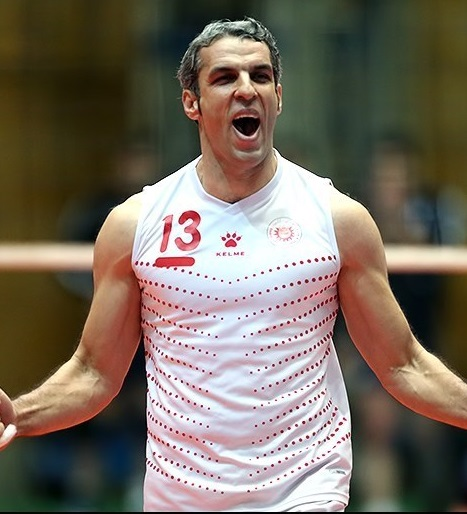

Personal information
- Nationality: Iranian
- Born: 10 March 1979 (age 47); Qazvin, Iran
- Height: 195 cm (77 in)

Volleyball information
- Position: Setter
- Current club: Shahrdari Tabriz VC
- Number: 13

Career
Years	Teams
2001–2005; 2005–2007; 2007–2008; 2008–2009; 2009–2010; 2010–2011; 2011–2012; 2012–2013; 2013–2015; 2015–2016; 2016–	(Iran) Paykan (Iran) Pegah (Iran) Pardis (Iran) Erteashat (Iran) Petrochimi (Iran) Barij (Iran) Urmia (Iran) Barij (Iran) Tabriz (Iran) Arman (Iran) Tabriz

National team
2002–2016	Iran
Honours
Representing Iran
Men's volleyball
Asian Games
Silver medal – second place	2002 Busan	Team
AVC Cup
Gold medal – first place	2016 Nakhon Pathom	Team

Alireza Behboudi (Persian: علیرضا بهبودی, born 10 March 1979) is an Iranian male volleyball player, who plays as a setter. He was part of the Iran men's national volleyball team. Currently he is a member of club Shahrdari Tabriz in the Iranian Volleyball Super League Behboudi named MVP in 2016 AVC Cup.

== Honours ==
=== National team ===
- Asian Games
  - Silver medal (1): 2002
- AVC Cup
  - Gold medal (1): 2016
- Asian Junior Championship
  - Gold medal (1): 1998

=== Club ===
- Asian Championship
  - Gold medal (1): 2002 (Paykan)
  - Silver medal (1): 2004 (Paykan)
- Iranian Super League
  - Champions (1): 2003 (Paykan)

=== Individual ===
- Most Valuable Player: 2016 AVC Cup
