= 2012–13 Iranian Volleyball Super League =

Locations of the 2012–13 season teams

The Iranian Volleyball Super League 2012–13 was the 26th season of the Iranian Volleyball Super League, the highest professional volleyball league in Iran.

== Regular season ==
=== Standings ===
Rank	Team	Pts	Matches			Details						Sets		
Rank	Team	Pts	Pld	W	L	3–0	3–1	3–2	2–3	1–3	0–3	W	L	Ratio
1	Paykan Tehran	49	22	17	5	9	5	3	3	1	1	58	26	2.230
2	Matin Varamin	47	22	16	6	5	9	2	1	2	3	52	31	1.677
3	Saipa Alborz	42	22	15	7	4	5	6	3	3	1	54	38	1.421
4	Kalleh Mazandaran	41	22	15	7	5	6	4	0	3	4	48	35	1.371
5	Shahrdari Urmia	41	22	14	8	4	6	4	3	3	2	51	38	1.342
6	Pishgaman Kavir Yazd	36	22	11	11	4	5	2	5	6	0	49	42	1.166
7	Mizan Khorasan	34	22	10	12	1	7	2	6	4	2	46	47	0.978
8	Barij Essence Kashan	30	22	11	11	2	4	5	2	4	5	41	47	0.872
9	Aluminium Al-Mahdi Hormozgan	28	22	11	11	2	3	6	1	7	3	42	48	0.875
10	Shahrdari Tabriz	22	22	6	16	2	3	1	5	8	3	36	53	0.679
11	Novin Keshavarz Tehran	16	22	5	17	0	2	3	4	7	6	30	59	0.508
12	Javaheri Gonbad	8	22	1	21	0	0	1	6	7	8	22	65	0.338

- Paykan was docked 2 points due to not having a junior team.

=== Results ===
	ALU	BRJ	JAV	KAL	MAT	MIZ	NOV	PAY	PSH	SAI	TAB	URM
Aluminium		3–1	3–2	3–0	0–3	3–1	1–3	0–3	3–2	3–1	3–0	1–3
Barij Essence	3–1		3–0	0–3	2–3	3–1	3–2	0–3	3–2	2–3	3–1	3–0
Javaheri Gonbad	2–3	2–3		2–3	0–3	3–2	1–3	1–3	0–3	2–3	1–3	0–3
Kalleh	3–2	3–1	3–1		3–0	0–3	3–0	3–2	3–1	3–1	3–1	3–0
Matin	3–1	3–0	3–1	3–1		3–2	3–1	3–0	1–3	0–3	3–1	2–3
Mizan	2–3	3–1	3–1	3–1	1–3		3–1	0–3	3–2	2–3	2–3	3–1
Novin Keshavarz	2–3	1–3	3–2	0–3	0–3	1–3		0–3	0–3	2–3	1–3	2–3
Paykan	3–0	3–0	3–0	3–1	1–3	2–3	3–1		3–1	3–2	3–2	3–1
Pishgaman	3–1	2–3	3–0	3–0	1–3	1–3	2–3	3–2		1–3	3–1	3–2
Saipa	3–1	2–3	3–0	2–3	3–0	3–1	3–1	0–3	3–1		3–2	3–2
Shahrdari Tabriz	2–3	3–0	3–1	1–3	1–3	3–0	2–3	0–3	1–3	0–3		2–3
Shahrdari Urmia	3–1	3–1	3–0	3–0	3–1	3–2	3–0	2–3	1–3	3–1	3–1	

== Playoffs ==
Semifinals
1	Paykan	2	3	1
4	Kalleh	3	2	3
2	Matin	3	2	3
3	Saipa	0	3	0

Final
4	Kalleh	1	3	4
2	Matin	3	0	3
3rd place
1	Paykan	3	3	6
3	Saipa	0	2	2

=== Semifinals ===
Paykan vs. Kalleh

Date		Score		Set 1	Set 2	Set 3	Set 4	Set 5	Total
20 Feb	Paykan Tehran	2–3	Kalleh Mazandaran	28–30	25–19	21–25	25–16	12–15	111–105
27 Feb	Kalleh Mazandaran	2–3	Paykan Tehran	24–26	25–20	25–20	23–25	13–15	110–106
06 Mar	Paykan Tehran	1–3	Kalleh Mazandaran	20–25	26–28	25–22	23–25		94–100

Matin vs. Saipa

Date		Score		Set 1	Set 2	Set 3	Set 4	Set 5	Total
20 Feb	Matin Varamin	3–0	Saipa Alborz	25–23	25–16	25–21			75–60
27 Feb	Saipa Alborz	3–2	Matin Varamin	25–22	17–25	21–25	25–18	17–15	105–105
06 Mar	Matin Varamin	3–0	Saipa Alborz	25–0	25–0	25–0			75–0

- Saipa forfeited the match against Matin after they walked out at the score of 23–25, 14–25, 25–23, 25–17, 14–11.

=== 3rd place ===
- Venue: Azadi Indoor Stadium, Tehran

Paykan vs. Saipa

Date		Score		Set 1	Set 2	Set 3	Set 4	Set 5	Total
13 Mar	Paykan Tehran	3–0	Saipa Alborz	25–20	25–20	25–23			75–63
15 Mar	Saipa Alborz	2–3	Paykan Tehran	24–26	25–21	25–23	21–25	13–15	108–110

=== Final ===
- Venue: Azadi Indoor Stadium, Tehran

Kalleh vs. Matin

Date		Score		Set 1	Set 2	Set 3	Set 4	Set 5	Total
13 Mar	Matin Varamin	3–1	Kalleh Mazandaran	21–25	25–21	31–29	25–23		102–98
15 Mar	Kalleh Mazandaran	3–0	Matin Varamin	27–25	32–30	25–23			84–78

== Final standings ==
Rank	Team	Qualification or relegation
1	Kalleh Mazandaran	2013 Asian Club Championship
2	Matin Varamin	
3	Paykan Tehran	
4	Saipa Alborz	
5	Shahrdari Urmia	
6	Pishgaman Kavir Yazd	
7	Mizan Khorasan	
8	Barij Essence Kashan	
9	Aluminium Al-Mahdi Hormozgan	
10	Shahrdari Tabriz	
11	Novin Keshavarz Tehran	Relegation to the first division
12	Javaheri Gonbad	Relegation to the first division
