= Bahram Farid =

Iranian volleyball player (born 1984)

Personal information
- Born: 1984 (age 41–42); Urmia, Iran
- Height: 188 cm (6 ft 2 in)

Volleyball information
- Position: Outside Spiker
- Current club: (Iran) Shardari Urmia
- Number: 7

Career
Years	Teams
?–2013; 2013–2014; 2014–2015; 2015–2016; 2016–	(Iran) Shardari Urmia (Iran) Matin (Iran) Shahrdari Tabriz (Iran) Shahrdari Urmia (Iran) Shahrdari Tabriz

Bahram Farid Ghara-Ghisahlagh (Persian: بهرام فرید قره قشلاق, was born 1984 in Urmia, West Azerbaijan) is a volleyball player from Iran, who plays as an Outside Spiker for Shahrdari Tabriz VC in Iranian Volleyball Super League.
