= Jahangir Seyed-Abbasi =

Iranian volleyball player

Jahangir Seyyed Abbasi

Personal information
- Born: Urmia, Iran

Coaching information
- Current team: Shardari Urmia (Head coach)
Previous teams coached
Years	Teams
2008–2009; 2010–2011; 2014–2016	Shardari Urmia; Shardari Urmia; Shardari Urmia

Career
Teams
	(Iran) Shardari Urmia

National team
Iran

Jahangir Seyyed Abbasi (Persian: جهانگیر سیدعباسی, born in Urmia, West Azerbaijan) is a former volleyball player from Iran for Shahrdari Urmia VC in Iranian Volleyball Super League, he is coach of Shahrdari Urmia in Iranian Volleyball Super League. and expert volleyball from Iran.

Jahangir Seyyed Abbasi and his brother Vahid Seyyed Abbasi are the uncles of Saeid Marouf.

== Awards and honours ==
Shahrdari Urmia VC Head coach in Iranian Volleyball Super League

- Runners-Up (1): 2014–15
- Third Place (2): 2008–09, 2015-2016
