= Vahid Seyed-Abbasi =

Iranian volleyball player

Vahid Seyyed Abbasi
Personal information
- Born: Urmia, Iran

Volleyball information
- Position: Setter
- Current club: (Iran) Shardari Urmia
- Number: 14

Career
- Years: Team
- –: (Iran) Shardari Urmia (Iran) Kaleh (Iran) Shahrdari Urmia

Vahid Seyyed Abbasi (Persian: وحید سیدعباسی, born in Urmia, West Azerbaijan) is a volleyball player from Iran, who plays as a Setter for Shahrdari Urmia VC in Iranian Volleyball Super League. Vahid Seyyed Abbasi and his brother Jahangir Seyyed Abbasi are the uncles of Saeid Marouf.
