= 2013–14 Iranian Volleyball Super League =

Locations of the 2013–14 season teams

The Iranian Volleyball Super League 2013–14 was the 27th season of the Iranian Volleyball Super League, the highest professional volleyball league in Iran.

== Regular season ==
=== Standings ===
Rank	Team	Pts	Matches			Details						Sets		
Rank	Team	Pts	Pld	W	L	3–0	3–1	3–2	2–3	1–3	0–3	W	L	Ratio
1	Barij Essence Kashan	49	22	16	6	8	7	1	2	2	2	54	27	2.000
2	Matin Varamin	48	22	17	5	9	3	5	2	3	0	58	28	2.071
3	Mizan Khorasan	43	22	14	8	5	7	2	3	2	3	50	35	1.429
4	Kalleh Mazandaran	38	22	14	8	2	6	6	2	3	3	49	42	1.167
5	Paykan Tehran	35	22	13	9	2	5	6	2	5	2	48	44	1.091
6	Shahrdari Tabriz	31	22	10	12	3	5	2	3	5	4	41	45	0.911
7	Novin Keshavarz Tehran	29	22	11	11	2	4	5	1	7	3	42	47	0.894
8	Shahrdari Urmia	28	22	7	15	4	3	0	7	4	4	39	48	0.813
9	Aluminium Al-Mahdi Hormozgan	27	22	8	14	3	1	4	7	3	4	41	51	0.804
10	Javaheri Gonbad	26	22	8	14	2	4	2	4	5	5	37	50	0.740
11	Shahrdari Zahedan	25	22	8	14	2	5	1	2	6	6	34	49	0.694
12	Saipa Alborz	17	22	6	16	1	1	4	3	6	7	30	57	0.526

=== Results ===
	ALU	BRJ	JAV	KAL	MAT	MIZ	NOV	PAY	SAI	TAB	URM	ZAH
Aluminium		0–3	3–0	2–3	2–3	3–2	2–3	3–2	3–0	3–1	3–2	3–0
Barij Essence	3–1		3–1	3–0	2–3	3–0	3–1	3–0	3–0	3–0	3–2	3–1
Javaheri Gonbad	3–0	3–0		2–3	2–3	1–3	3–1	3–2	3–1	1–3	0–3	2–3
Kalleh	2–3	3–1	3–0		3–2	0–3	3–1	3–1	3–0	3–2	3–1	3–2
Matin	3–2	3–1	3–0	3–0		3–0	3–0	1–3	3–0	3–0	3–0	3–1
Mizan	3–2	0–3	3–0	3–1	3–2		3–0	3–1	2–3	3–1	3–0	3–0
Novin Keshavarz	3–1	1–3	1–3	3–1	1–3	1–3		2–3	3–2	3–1	3–1	3–0
Paykan	3–2	1–3	3–2	3–2	3–1	3–2	3–0		3–1	1–3	3–1	1–3
Saipa	3–2	0–3	1–3	1–3	0–3	1–3	2–3	3–0		3–2	3–2	3–1
Shahrdari Tabriz	3–0	3–2	3–1	1–3	0–3	1–3	0–3	2–3	3–2		3–0	3–1
Shahrdari Urmia	3–1	3–0	2–3	2–3	2–3	3–1	2–3	1–3	3–1	0–3		3–0
Shahrdari Zahedan	3–0	1–3	3–1	3–1	3–1	3–1	2–3	0–3	3–0	1–3	0–3	

== Playoffs ==
- All times are Iran Standard Time (UTC+03:30).
- All series were the best-of-three format, except for the single-match 3rd place playoff and final.

Quarterfinals
1	Barij Essence	1	1	—
8	Shahrdari Urmia	3	3	—
4	Kalleh	3	2	3
5	Paykan	0	3	1
2	Matin	3	3	—
7	Novin Keshavarz	1	1	—
3	Mizan	3	0	3
6	Shahrdari Tabriz	1	3	2

Semifinals
8	Shahrdari Urmia	3	1	2
4	Kalleh	0	3	3
2	Matin	3	3	—
3	Mizan	2	0	—

Final
4	Kalleh	2	—	—
2	Matin	3	—	—
3rd place
8	Shahrdari Urmia	3	—	—
3	Mizan	0	—	—

=== Quarterfinals ===
Barij Essence Kashan vs. Shahrdari Urmia

Date	Time		Score		Set 1	Set 2	Set 3	Set 4	Set 5	Total
19 Feb	16:00	Barij Essence Kashan	1–3	Shahrdari Urmia	25–20	25–27	23–25	22–25		95–97
26 Feb	16:00	Shahrdari Urmia	3–1	Barij Essence Kashan	23–25	26–24	25–19	25–22		99–90

Kalleh Mazandaran vs. Paykan Tehran

Date	Time		Score		Set 1	Set 2	Set 3	Set 4	Set 5	Total
19 Feb	17:00	Kalleh Mazandaran	3–0	Paykan Tehran	25–23	26–24	25–21			76–68
26 Feb	16:00	Paykan Tehran	3–2	Kalleh Mazandaran	23–25	25–21	17–25	25–13	16–14	106–98
02 Mar	16:00	Kalleh Mazandaran	3–1	Paykan Tehran	21–25	25–19	25–22	25–17		96–83

Matin Varamin vs. Novin Keshavarz Tehran

Date	Time		Score		Set 1	Set 2	Set 3	Set 4	Set 5	Total
19 Feb	16:00	Matin Varamin	3–1	Novin Keshavarz Tehran	23–25	25–23	25–17	25–20		98–85
25 Feb	16:00	Novin Keshavarz Tehran	1–3	Matin Varamin	22–25	25–20	20–25	20–25		87–95

Mizan Khorasan vs. Shahrdari Tabriz

Date	Time		Score		Set 1	Set 2	Set 3	Set 4	Set 5	Total
19 Feb	16:00	Mizan Khorasan	3–1	Shahrdari Tabriz	25–18	25–17	19–25	28–26		97–86
25 Feb	16:00	Shahrdari Tabriz	3–0	Mizan Khorasan	30–28	25–21	28–26			83–75
02 Mar	16:00	Mizan Khorasan	3–2	Shahrdari Tabriz	25–15	19–25	20–25	25–16	15–13	104–94

=== Semifinals ===
- Venue: Azadi Indoor Stadium, Tehran

Shahrdari Urmia vs. Kalleh Mazandaran

Date	Time		Score		Set 1	Set 2	Set 3	Set 4	Set 5	Total
07 Mar	18:00	Kalleh Mazandaran	0–3	Shahrdari Urmia	21–25	21–25	15–25			57–75
09 Mar	16:00	Shahrdari Urmia	1–3	Kalleh Mazandaran	25–19	23–25	20–25	22–25		90–94
11 Mar	17:00	Kalleh Mazandaran	3–2	Shahrdari Urmia	25–23	27–29	25–21	23–25	16–14	116–112

Matin Varamin vs. Mizan Khorasan

Date	Time		Score		Set 1	Set 2	Set 3	Set 4	Set 5	Total
07 Mar	16:00	Matin Varamin	3–2	Mizan Khorasan	21–25	25–21	25–19	25–27	18–16	114–108
09 Mar	18:00	Mizan Khorasan	0–3	Matin Varamin	15–25	20–25	18–25			53–75

=== 3rd place ===
- Venue: Azadi Indoor Stadium, Tehran

Shahrdari Urmia vs. Mizan Khorasan

Date	Time		Score		Set 1	Set 2	Set 3	Set 4	Set 5	Total
13 Mar	11:00	Mizan Khorasan	0–3	Shahrdari Urmia	22–25	23–25	22–25			67–75

=== Final ===
- Venue: Azadi Indoor Stadium, Tehran

Kalleh Mazandaran vs. Matin Varamin

Date	Time		Score		Set 1	Set 2	Set 3	Set 4	Set 5	Total
13 Mar	15:30	Matin Varamin	3–2	Kalleh Mazandaran	23–25	25–19	23–25	25–20	15–10	111–99

== Final standings ==
Rank	Team	Qualification or relegation
1	Matin Varamin	2014 Asian Club Championship
2	Kalleh Mazandaran	
3	Shahrdari Urmia	
4	Mizan Khorasan	
5	Novin Keshavarz Tehran	
6	Paykan Tehran	
7	Shahrdari Tabriz	
8	Barij Essence Kashan	
9	Aluminium Al-Mahdi Hormozgan	
10	Javaheri Gonbad	
11	Shahrdari Zahedan	Relegation to the first division
12	Saipa Alborz	Relegation to the first division
