= 2018–19 Iranian Volleyball Super League =

Locations of the 2018–19 season teams

The Iranian Volleyball Super League 2018–19 was the 32nd season of the Iranian Volleyball Super League, the highest professional volleyball league in Iran. The season started on 10 October 2018 and ended on 18 March 2019.

== Regular season ==
=== Standings ===
Rank	Team	Matches			Pts	Details						Sets		
Rank	Team	Pld	W	L	Pts	3–0	3–1	3–2	2–3	1–3	0–3	W	L	Ratio
1	Shahrdari Varamin	24	20	4	59	9	8	3	2	1	1	65	26	2.500
2	Paykan Tehran	24	16	8	49	4	9	3	4	1	3	57	39	1.462
3	Khatam Ardakan	24	15	9	47	7	6	2	4	2	3	55	37	1.486
4	Foolad Sirjan Iranian	24	15	9	45	5	6	4	4	2	3	55	41	1.341
5	Payam Mashhad	24	15	9	43	6	3	6	4	3	2	56	42	1.333
6	Kalleh Mazandaran	24	15	9	41	6	2	7	3	4	2	55	43	1.279
7	Saipa Tehran	24	13	11	39	4	6	3	3	6	2	51	45	1.133
8	Shahrdari Gonbad	24	13	11	37	3	3	7	5	3	3	52	50	1.040
9	Shahrvand Arak	24	11	13	31	3	4	4	2	5	6	42	51	0.824
10	Shahrdari Tabriz	24	10	14	31	2	5	3	4	5	5	43	53	0.811
11	Shahrdari Urmia	24	7	17	24	1	4	2	5	7	5	38	59	0.644
12	Oghab Nahaja Tehran	24	4	20	12	1	0	3	3	10	7	28	66	0.424
13	Dorna Urmia	24	2	22	10	1	1	0	4	8	10	22	67	0.328

=== Results ===
	DOR	FOI	KAL	KHA	OGH	PAM	PAY	SAI	GON	TAB	URM	VAR	SHV
Dorna		1–3	0–3	1–3	3–1	0–3	1–3	0–3	3–0	0–3	2–3	0–3	2–3
Foolad Sirjan	3–0		3–2	3–0	3–2	1–3	1–3	3–2	2–3	3–1	3–1	0–3	3–1
Kalleh	3–0	3–2		1–3	3–0	3–1	3–2	1–3	3–0	3–1	3–2	2–3	3–0
Khatam	3–1	3–2	2–3		3–0	3–0	1–3	3–0	3–2	3–0	3–1	1–3	3–0
Oghab Nahaja	3–0	0–3	3–2	1–3		0–3	1–3	1–3	3–2	1–3	3–2	1–3	1–3
Payam	3–1	3–0	3–0	3–0	3–2		2–3	3–2	2–3	3–2	3–1	3–2	3–2
Paykan	3–1	3–0	3–1	3–2	3–0	0–3		3–2	2–3	1–3	3–1	3–1	3–1
Saipa	3–1	1–3	3–1	0–3	3–1	3–2	3–0		1–3	3–1	1–3	3–0	3–2
Shahrdari Gonbad	3–2	2–3	0–3	3–2	3–2	3–1	3–0	2–3		3–2	3–0	1–3	3–1
Shahrdari Tabriz	3–2	0–3	2–3	0–3	3–1	3–2	0–3	3–1	3–2		3–0	1–3	3–1
Shahrdari Urmia	3–0	1–3	2–3	1–3	3–1	2–3	0–3	0–3	3–1	3–2		0–3	2–3
Shahrdari Varamin	3–0	3–2	2–3	3–0	3–0	3–0	3–2	3–1	3–1	3–1	3–1		3–0
Shahrvand Arak	3–1	0–3	3–0	3–2	3–0	3–1	3–2	3–1	0–3	3–0	1–3	0–3	

== Playoffs ==
- All times are Iran Standard Time (UTC+03:30).
- All series were the best-of-three format, except for the single-match 3rd place playoff.

Quarterfinals
1	Shahrdari Varamin	3	3	—
8	Shahrdari Gonbad	0	1	—
4	Foolad Sirjan	1	1	—
5	Payam	3	3	—
2	Paykan	3	1	2
7	Saipa	0	3	3
3	Khatam	2	1	—
6	Kalleh	3	3	—

Semifinals
1	Shahrdari Varamin	3	3	—
5	Payam	1	0	—
7	Saipa	3	3	—
6	Kalleh	1	0	—

Final
1	Shahrdari Varamin	1	3	3
7	Saipa	3	1	0
3rd place (Canceled)
5	Payam	X	—	—
6	Kalleh	X	—	—

=== Quarterfinals ===
Shahrdari Varamin vs. Shahrdari Gonbad

Date	Time		Score		Set 1	Set 2	Set 3	Set 4	Set 5	Total
20 Feb	16:00	Shahrdari Varamin	3–0	Shahrdari Gonbad	25–17	25–19	25–21			75–57
24 Feb	16:00	Shahrdari Gonbad	1–3	Shahrdari Varamin	25–21	18–25	21–25	23–25		87–96

Foolad Sirjan Iranian vs. Payam Mashhad

Date	Time		Score		Set 1	Set 2	Set 3	Set 4	Set 5	Total
20 Feb	16:00	Foolad Sirjan Iranian	1–3	Payam Mashhad	25–18	15–25	22–25	22–25		84–93
24 Feb	16:00	Payam Mashhad	3–1	Foolad Sirjan Iranian	25–20	22–25	25–20	25–20		97–85

Paykan Tehran vs. Saipa Tehran

Date	Time		Score		Set 1	Set 2	Set 3	Set 4	Set 5	Total
20 Feb	16:00	Paykan Tehran	3–0	Saipa Tehran	25–19	25–21	25–19			75–59
24 Feb	16:00	Saipa Tehran	3–1	Paykan Tehran	21–25	25–19	25–20	25–18		96–82
27 Feb	16:00	Paykan Tehran	2–3	Saipa Tehran	19–25	25–19	25–19	22–25	10–15	101–103

Khatam Ardakan vs. Kalleh Mazandaran

Date	Time		Score		Set 1	Set 2	Set 3	Set 4	Set 5	Total
20 Feb	16:00	Khatam Ardakan	2–3	Kalleh Mazandaran	25–21	24–26	21–25	25–19	10–15	105–106
24 Feb	16:00	Kalleh Mazandaran	3–1	Khatam Ardakan	27–25	25–18	21–25	25–19		98–87

=== Semifinals ===
Shahrdari Varamin vs. Payam Mashhad

Date	Time		Score		Set 1	Set 2	Set 3	Set 4	Set 5	Total
3 Mar	16:00	Shahrdari Varamin	3–1	Payam Mashhad	25–15	25–20	24–26	25–19		99–80
6 Mar	16:00	Payam Mashhad	0–3	Shahrdari Varamin	20–25	22–25	21–25			63–75

Saipa Tehran vs. Kalleh Mazandaran

Date	Time		Score		Set 1	Set 2	Set 3	Set 4	Set 5	Total
3 Mar	16:00	Kalleh Mazandaran	1–3	Saipa Tehran	25–23	17–25	20–25	27–29		89–102
6 Mar	16:00	Saipa Tehran	3–0	Kalleh Mazandaran	25–13	25–22	25–17			75–52

=== 3rd place ===
- Venue: Azadi Indoor Stadium, Tehran

Payam Mashhad vs. Kalleh Mazandaran

- The 3rd place playoff between Payam Mashhad and Kalleh Mazandaran, initially scheduled for 16 March, was canceled by mutual agreement. The two teams shared the 3rd place.

=== Final ===
- Venue: Azadi Indoor Stadium, Tehran

Shahrdari Varamin vs. Saipa Tehran

Date	Time		Score		Set 1	Set 2	Set 3	Set 4	Set 5	Total
14 Mar	16:00	Shahrdari Varamin	1–3	Saipa Tehran	22–25	26–24	17–25	23–25		88–99
17 Mar	17:30	Saipa Tehran	1–3	Shahrdari Varamin	25–20	24–26	18–25	20–25		87–96
18 Mar	16:00	Shahrdari Varamin	3–0	Saipa Tehran	25–22	25–23	25–22			75–67

== Final standings ==
Rank	Team	Qualification or relegation
1	Shahrdari Varamin	2019 Asian Club Championship
2	Saipa Tehran	
3	Kalleh Mazandaran	
3	Payam Mashhad	
5	Paykan Tehran	
6	Khatam Ardakan	
7	Foolad Sirjan Iranian	
8	Shahrdari Gonbad	
9	Shahrvand Arak	
10	Shahrdari Tabriz	
11	Shahrdari Urmia	
12	Oghab Nahaja Tehran	Relegation to the first division
13	Dorna Urmia	Relegation to the first division
