= Milad Ebadipour =

Iranian volleyball player (born 1993)

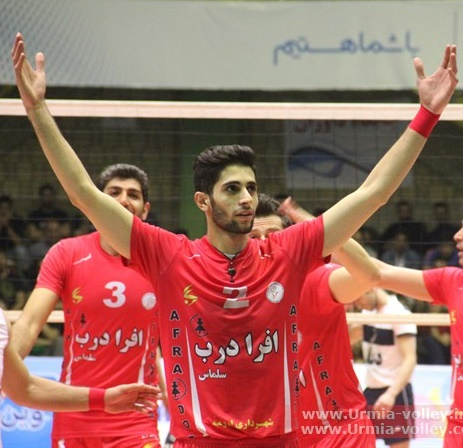
- Ebadipour in 2015

Personal information
- Full name: Milad Ebadipour Gharahassanlou
- Born: 17 October 1993 (age 33); Urmia, Iran
- Height: 1.96 m (6 ft 5 in)
- Weight: 78 kg (172 lb)
- Spike: 364 cm (143 in)
- Block: 346 cm (136 in)

Volleyball information
- Position: Outside hitter

Career
Years	Teams
2012–2014; 2014–2016; 2016–2017; 2017; 2017–2022; 2022–2023; 2023–2024; 2024–2026	Kalleh Mazandaran; Shahrdari Urmia; Sarmayeh Bank Tehran; Al Rayyan; Skra Bełchatów; Allianz Milano; Ural Ufa; Norwid Częstochowa

National team
2014–	Iran
Honours
Men's volleyball
Representing Iran
FIVB World Grand Champions Cup
Bronze medal – third place	2017 Japan
AVC Asian Championship
Gold medal – first place	2019 Iran
Gold medal – first place	2021 Japan
Asian Games
Gold medal – first place	2014 Incheon
Gold medal – first place	2018 Jakarta/Palembang

Milad Ebadipour Gharahassanlou (Persian: میلاد عبادی‌پور قره‌حسنلو; born 17 October 1993) is an Iranian professional volleyball player who plays as an outside hitter for the Iran national team. He has represented his country in 2 Olympic Games (Rio 2016, Tokyo 2020).

== Career ==
Ebadipour was called up to the national team for the 2014 World League, following his consistent and strong performance in the Iranian Super League, and made his first appearance in the national team in a match against Italy.

Ebadipour made his debut in the Iranian Super League, signing a three–year contract with Kalleh Mazandaran. In August 2017, he joined Skra Bełchatów in the Polish PlusLiga. He won a bronze medal at the 2017 World Grand Champions Cup, and received an individual award for the Best outside spiker of the tournament.

== Honours ==
=== Club ===
- AVC Asian Club Championship
  - Tehran 2013 – with Kalleh Mazandaran
  - Naypyidaw 2016 – with Sarmayeh Bank Tehran
  - Vietnam 2017 – with Sarmayeh Bank Tehran
- Domestic
  - 2012–13 Iranian Championship, with Kalleh Mazandaran
  - 2016–17 Iranian Championship, with Sarmayeh Bank Tehran
  - 2016–17 Emir Cup, with Al Rayyan
  - 2017–18 Polish SuperCup, with PGE Skra Bełchatów
  - 2017–18 Polish Championship, with PGE Skra Bełchatów
  - 2018–19 Polish SuperCup, with PGE Skra Bełchatów

=== Individual awards ===
- 2016: AVC Asian Club Championship – Best outside spiker
- 2017: AVC Asian Club Championship – Best outside spiker
- 2017: FIVB World Grand Champions Cup – Best outside spiker
- 2021: AVC Asian Championship – Best outside spiker
