= 1996–97 Iranian Volleyball League First Division =

The following is the final results of the Iranian Volleyball League First Division (Kowsar Cup) 1996/97 season.

== Regular season ==
=== Group A ===
			Matches			Sets			Qualification or relegation
Rank	Team	Pts	Pld	W	L	W	L	Ratio	Qualification or relegation
1	Foolad Khuzestan	22	12	10	2	32	13	2.462	Final 4
2	Paykan Tehran	22	12	10	2	31	13	2.385	Final 4
3	Moghavemat Urmia	19	12	7	5	28	20	1.400	
4	Abgineh Qazvin	19	12	7	5	28	23	1.217	
5	Foolad Mobarakeh Isfahan	16	12	4	8	18	28	0.643	Relegation to the second division
6	Fajr Sepah Aqqala	15	12	3	9	13	29	0.448	Relegation to the second division
7	Profil Saveh	13	12	1	11	10	34	0.294	Relegation to the second division

=== Group B ===
			Matches			Sets			Qualification or relegation
Rank	Team	Pts	Pld	W	L	W	L	Ratio	Qualification or relegation
1	Fajr Sepah Tehran	22	12	10	2	32	13	2.462	Final 4
2	Zob Ahan Isfahan	22	12	10	2	32	16	2.000	Final 4
3	Persepolis Tehran	21	12	9	3	30	12	2.500	
4	Shahrdari Mashhad	17	12	5	7	19	24	0.792	
5	Siman Soufian Tabriz	17	12	5	7	17	25	0.680	Relegation to the second division
6	Neopan Gonbad	15	12	3	9	18	29	0.621	Relegation to the second division
7	15 Khordad Gorgan	12	12	0	12	7	36	0.194	Relegation to the second division

== Final 4 ==
All matches at the Azadi Volleyball Hall.

			Matches			Sets			Set points			Qualification or relegation
Rank	Team	Pts	Pld	W	L	W	L	Ratio	W	L	Ratio	Qualification or relegation
1	Paykan Tehran	5	3	2	1	8	6	1.333	183	162	1.130	1997 Asian Club Championship
2	Zob Ahan Isfahan	5	3	2	1	8	6	1.333	170	163	1.043	
3	Fajr Sepah Tehran	5	3	2	1	7	6	1.167	160	151	1.060	
4	Foolad Khuzestan	3	3	0	3	4	9	0.444	135	172	0.785	

Date		Score		Set 1	Set 2	Set 3	Set 4	Set 5	Total
07 Jan	Foolad Khuzestan	2–3	Zob Ahan Isfahan	5–15	15–5	15–9	9–15	11–15	55–59
07 Jan	Fajr Sepah Tehran	3–2	Paykan Tehran	15–11	13–15	15–8	5–15	15–10	63–59
08 Jan	Fajr Sepah Tehran	1–3	Zob Ahan Isfahan	15–10	5–15	10–15	9–15		39–55
08 Jan	Foolad Khuzestan	1–3	Paykan Tehran	7–15	15–10	8–15	13–15		43–55
09 Jan	Foolad Khuzestan	1–3	Fajr Sepah Tehran	15–13	10–15	7–15	5–15		37–58
09 Jan	Paykan Tehran	3–2	Zob Ahan Isfahan	15–3	15–12	10–15	14–16	15–10	69–56
