= 2020–21 Iranian Volleyball Super League =

Locations of the 2020–21 season teams

The Iranian Volleyball Super League 2020–21 was the 34th season of the Iranian Volleyball Super League, the highest professional volleyball league in Iran. The season started on 9 September 2020 and ended on 16 March 2021. IRIVF announced on 2 September 2020 that Shahrdari Qazvin were excluded from the league due to non-fulfillment of their obligations. Shahrvand Arak replaced them. But, Shahrdari Qazvin took the necessary measures for its financial obligations after being eliminated from the league and re-applied to participate in the league. On 6 September 2020, since all participating teams agreed, it was announced that Shahrdari Qazvin would participate in the league. Due to COVID-19 pandemic in Iran, the season was suspended on 10 October 2020 and resumed on 8 November 2020. Since the season resumed, the regular season matches were held at the neutral venues in Tehran (Azadi Volleyball Hall and Tehran House of Volleyball).

== Regular season ==
=== Standings ===
Rank	Team	Matches			Pts	Details						Sets		
Rank	Team	Pld	W	L	Pts	3–0	3–1	3–2	2–3	1–3	0–3	W	L	Ratio
1	Foolad Sepahan	26	22	4	65	10	10	2	1	2	1	70	26	2.692
2	Shahrdari Urmia	26	21	5	62	9	9	3	2	2	1	69	30	2.300
3	Shahdab Yazd	26	21	5	59	6	11	4	0	4	1	67	34	1.971
4	Foolad Sirjan	26	20	6	59	10	7	3	2	4	0	68	31	2.194
5	Saipa Tehran	26	18	8	56	9	8	1	3	5	0	65	34	1.912
6	Labanyat Haraz Amol	26	18	8	52	10	3	5	3	3	2	63	37	1.703
7	Shahrdari Gonbad	26	13	13	41	5	7	1	3	4	6	49	48	1.021
8	Shahrdari Varamin	26	12	14	36	3	5	4	4	5	5	49	55	0.891
9	Hoorsun Ramsar	26	10	16	30	1	6	3	3	5	8	41	60	0.683
10	Paykan Tehran	26	10	16	29	4	5	1	0	8	8	38	55	0.691
11	Khatam Ardakan	26	6	20	22	4	2	0	4	10	6	36	62	0.581
12	Shahrdari Qazvin	26	5	21	15	2	2	1	1	10	10	27	67	0.403
13	Rahyab Melal Marivan	26	3	23	11	1	1	1	3	7	13	22	72	0.306
14	Azar Battery Urmia	26	3	23	9	0	2	1	1	9	13	20	73	0.274
—	Shahrvand Arak	–	–	–	–	–	–	–	–	–	–	–	–	–

- Shahrvand Arak were excluded from the league during the regular season due to non-fulfillment of their obligations. All results were declared null and void.

=== Results ===
	AZB	FOE	FOI	HOO	KHA	LAB	PAY	RAH	SAI	SHD	GON	QAZ	URM	VAR
Azar Battery		0–3	0–3	2–3	0–3	3–2	0–3	1–3	1–3	0–3	0–3	1–3	0–3	1–3
Foolad Sepahan	3–0		1–3	3–0	3–1	3–2	3–0	3–0	3–1	3–1	3–1	3–0	3–1	3–0
Foolad Sirjan	3–1	3–0		3–1	3–0	1–3	3–0	3–0	1–3	3–1	3–0	3–1	2–3	2–3
Hoorsun	3–1	0–3	2–3		3–2	2–3	0–3	3–1	1–3	0–3	3–1	3–1	1–3	2–3
Khatam	1–3	1–3	1–3	3–0		2–3	0–3	3–0	0–3	1–3	1–3	3–1	2–3	1–3
Labanyat	3–0	1–3	1–3	3–0	3–1		3–0	3–0	3–2	2–3	1–3	3–0	0–3	3–2
Paykan	3–1	1–3	0–3	1–3	3–1	0–3		3–1	0–3	1–3	3–2	3–1	0–3	1–3
Rahyab Melal	1–3	0–3	2–3	2–3	0–3	0–3	0–3		1–3	0–3	0–3	2–3	1–3	0–3
Saipa	3–0	1–3	3–1	3–0	3–0	2–3	3–1	3–0		1–3	3–0	3–0	2–3	3–1
Shahdab	3–1	1–3	3–1	3–1	3–1	0–3	3–1	3–0	3–1		3–2	3–0	1–3	3–1
Shahrdari Gonbad	3–0	3–2	2–3	3–1	3–0	0–3	3–1	3–1	0–3	1–3		3–1	3–1	0–3
Shahrdari Qazvin	3–0	0–3	0–3	0–3	1–3	1–3	3–0	2–3	1–3	0–3	3–1		0–3	0–3
Shahrdari Urmia	3–0	3–1	0–3	3–0	3–0	3–0	3–1	3–1	3–1	2–3	3–0	3–1		3–1
Shahrdari Varamin	3–1	2–3	0–3	1–3	3–2	0–3	1–3	0–3	2–3	2–3	0–3	3–1	3–2	

== Playoffs ==
- Venue: Azadi Volleyball Hall, Tehran
- All times are Iran Standard Time (UTC+03:30).
- All series were the best-of-three format.

Quarterfinals
1	Foolad Sepahan	3	3	—
8	Shahrdari Varamin	2	1	—
4	Foolad Sirjan	3	3	—
5	Saipa	2	0	—
2	Shahrdari Urmia	3	1	3
7	Shahrdari Gonbad	2	3	2
3	Shahdab	1	3	1
6	Labanyat	3	2	3

Semifinals
1	Foolad Sepahan	0	0	—
4	Foolad Sirjan	3	3	—
2	Shahrdari Urmia	3	3	—
6	Labanyat	2	2	—

Final
4	Foolad Sirjan	2	3	3
2	Shahrdari Urmia	3	0	1
3rd place (Canceled)
1	Foolad Sepahan	X	X	X
6	Labanyat	X	X	X

=== Quarterfinals ===
Foolad Sepahan vs. Shahrdari Varamin

Date	Time		Score		Set 1	Set 2	Set 3	Set 4	Set 5	Total	Report
23 Feb	17:00	Foolad Sepahan	3–2	Shahrdari Varamin	25–22	23–25	26–24	20–25	15–13	109–109	P2
25 Feb	14:00	Shahrdari Varamin	1–3	Foolad Sepahan	28–26	19–25	23–25	18–25		88–101	

Foolad Sirjan vs. Saipa Tehran

Date	Time		Score		Set 1	Set 2	Set 3	Set 4	Set 5	Total	Report
23 Feb	14:00	Foolad Sirjan	3–2	Saipa Tehran	23–25	25–18	25–27	25–20	15–12	113–102	P2
25 Feb	17:00	Saipa Tehran	0–3	Foolad Sirjan	19–25	22–25	16–25			57–75	

Shahrdari Urmia vs. Shahrdari Gonbad

Date	Time		Score		Set 1	Set 2	Set 3	Set 4	Set 5	Total	Report
24 Feb	17:00	Shahrdari Urmia	3–2	Shahrdari Gonbad	23–25	25–22	25–17	22–25	15–9	110–98	P2
26 Feb	14:00	Shahrdari Gonbad	3–1	Shahrdari Urmia	25–22	19–25	25–19	25–22		94–88	P2
28 Feb	17:00	Shahrdari Urmia	3–2	Shahrdari Gonbad	26–24	25–18	24–26	18–25	17–15	110–108	P2

Shahdab Yazd vs. Labanyat Haraz Amol

Date	Time		Score		Set 1	Set 2	Set 3	Set 4	Set 5	Total	Report
24 Feb	14:00	Shahdab Yazd	1–3	Labanyat Haraz Amol	22–25	18–25	25–14	22–25		87–89	P2
26 Feb	17:00	Labanyat Haraz Amol	2–3	Shahdab Yazd	23–25	25–23	23–25	25–21	12–15	108–109	P2
28 Feb	14:00	Shahdab Yazd	1–3	Labanyat Haraz Amol	19–25	23–25	25–16	23–25		90–91	P2

=== Semifinals ===
Foolad Sepahan vs. Foolad Sirjan

Date	Time		Score		Set 1	Set 2	Set 3	Set 4	Set 5	Total	Report
5 Mar	14:00	Foolad Sepahan	0–3	Foolad Sirjan	20–25	20–25	26–28			66–78	P2
7 Mar	17:00	Foolad Sirjan	3–0	Foolad Sepahan	27–25	25–15	25–21			77–61	P2

Shahrdari Urmia vs. Labanyat Haraz Amol

Date	Time		Score		Set 1	Set 2	Set 3	Set 4	Set 5	Total	Report
5 Mar	17:00	Shahrdari Urmia	3–2	Labanyat Haraz Amol	29–27	30–28	21–25	19–25	15–12	114–117	P2
7 Mar	14:00	Labanyat Haraz Amol	2–3	Shahrdari Urmia	25–23	24–26	17–25	25–23	10–15	101–112	P2

=== 3rd place ===
Foolad Sepahan vs. Labanyat Haraz Amol

- The 3rd place playoffs between Foolad Sepahan and Labanyat Haraz Amol were canceled for various reasons. The two teams shared the 3rd place.

=== Final ===
Foolad Sirjan vs. Shahrdari Urmia

Date	Time		Score		Set 1	Set 2	Set 3	Set 4	Set 5	Total	Report
12 Mar	17:00	Shahrdari Urmia	3–2	Foolad Sirjan	19–25	25–18	25–21	22–25	15–13	106–102	P2
14 Mar	16:00	Foolad Sirjan	3–0	Shahrdari Urmia	28–26	25–22	25–21			78–69	P2
16 Mar	16:00	Shahrdari Urmia	1–3	Foolad Sirjan	23–25	28–30	25–21	21–25		97–101	P2

== Final standings ==
Rank	Team	Qualification or relegation
1	Foolad Sirjan	2021 Asian Club Championship
2	Shahrdari Urmia	
3	Foolad Sepahan	
3	Labanyat Haraz Amol	
5	Saipa Tehran	
5	Shahdab Yazd	
5	Shahrdari Gonbad	
5	Shahrdari Varamin	
9	Hoorsun Ramsar	
10	Paykan Tehran	
11	Khatam Ardakan	
12	Shahrdari Qazvin	
13	Rahyab Melal Marivan	
14	Azar Battery Urmia	Relegation to the first division
—	Shahrvand Arak	Relegation to the first division
