= 1997–98 Iranian Volleyball Super League =

The following is the final results of the Iranian Volleyball Super League 1997/98 season.

== Standings ==
			Matches			Sets			Qualification or relegation
Rank	Team	Pts	Pld	W	L	W	L	Ratio	Qualification or relegation
1	Paykan Tehran	27	14	13	1	41	13	3.154	1998 Asian Club Championship
2	Zob Ahan Isfahan	25	14	11	3	37	15	2.467	
3	Abgineh Qazvin	22	14	8	6	30	23	1.304	
4	Persepolis Tehran	21	14	7	7	29	23	1.261	
5	Fajr Sepah Aqqala	21	14	7	7	26	30	0.867	
6	Moghavemat Urmia	20	14	6	8	23	29	0.793	
7	Shahrdari Mashhad	16	14	2	12	14	38	0.368	Relegation to the first division
8	Neopan Gonbad	15	14	2	12	12	39	0.308	Relegation to the first division
