= 2005–06 Iranian Volleyball Super League =

The following is the final results of the Iranian Volleyball Super League (The Promised Cup) 2005/06 season.

== Standings ==
| | | | Matches | | | Sets | | | Qualification or relegation |
| Rank | Team | Pts | Pld | W | L | W | L | Ratio | Qualification or relegation |
|---|---|---|---|---|---|---|---|---|---|
| 1 | Paykan Tehran | 47 | 26 | 21 | 5 | 68 | 25 | 2.720 | 2006 Asian Club Championship |
| 2 | Saipa Tehran | 46 | 26 | 20 | 6 | 69 | 31 | 2.226 | |
| 3 | Azarpayam Ertebatat Urmia | 45 | 26 | 19 | 7 | 62 | 32 | 1.938 | |
| 4 | Pegah Urmia | 45 | 26 | 19 | 7 | 66 | 35 | 1.886 | |
| 5 | Bargh Tehran | 43 | 26 | 17 | 9 | 66 | 42 | 1.571 | |
| 6 | Sanam Tehran | 41 | 26 | 15 | 11 | 56 | 51 | 1.098 | |
| 7 | Petrochimi Bandar Imam | 40 | 26 | 14 | 12 | 53 | 47 | 1.128 | |
| 8 | Gol Gohar Sirjan | 40 | 26 | 14 | 12 | 47 | 47 | 1.000 | |
| 9 | Neopan Gonbad | 39 | 26 | 14 | 12 | 47 | 54 | 0.870 | |
| 10 | Etka Qom | 33 | 26 | 7 | 19 | 35 | 70 | 0.500 | |
| 11 | Persepolis Tehran | 32 | 26 | 6 | 20 | 34 | 68 | 0.500 | Relegation to the first division |
| 12 | Aidaneh Chaldoran | 32 | 26 | 6 | 20 | 34 | 68 | 0.500 | |
| 13 | Zob Ahan Isfahan | 31 | 26 | 5 | 21 | 38 | 71 | 0.535 | |
| 14 | Payam Mokhaberat Golestan | 31 | 26 | 5 | 21 | 32 | 66 | 0.485 | Relegation to the first division |

- Persepolis relegated as the worst team from Tehran.

== Results ==
| | AID | AZR | BRG | ETK | GOL | NEO | PMG | PAY | PEG | PRS | PET | SAI | SAN | ZOB |
|---|---|---|---|---|---|---|---|---|---|---|---|---|---|---|
| Aidaneh | | 0–3 | 3–2 | 2–3 | 1–3 | 0–3 | 3–0 | 2–3 | 0–3 | 3–0 | 1–3 | 0–3 | 0–3 | 3–2 |
| Azarpayam | 3–0 | | 3–2 | 3–0 | 0–3 | 3–0 | 3–1 | 2–3 | 1–3 | 3–1 | 3–0 | 3–1 | 3–1 | 3–1 |
| Bargh Tehran | 3–2 | 3–2 | | 3–2 | 3–0 | 0–3 | 3–1 | 3–1 | 3–2 | 2–3 | 3–0 | 2–3 | 2–3 | 3–0 |
| Etka | 3–2 | 0–3 | 1–3 | | 1–3 | 0–3 | 3–2 | 1–3 | 2–3 | 1–3 | 1–3 | 0–3 | 2–3 | 3–2 |
| Gol Gohar | 3–2 | 1–3 | 3–1 | 3–0 | | 3–1 | 3–0 | 0–3 | 1–3 | 3–1 | 0–3 | 0–3 | 2–3 | 3–1 |
| Neopan Gonbad | 3–1 | 0–3 | 1–3 | 2–3 | 3–1 | | 0–3* | 0–3 | 3–2 | 3–0 | 3–2 | 3–2 | 3–2 | 3–2 |
| Payam Mokhaberat | 2–3 | 0–3 | 1–3 | 3–0 | 1–3 | 2–3 | | 0–3 | 2–3 | 3–0 | 2–3 | 3–1 | 1–3 | 2–3 |
| Paykan | 3–0 | 3–0 | 3–2 | 3–0 | 3–0 | 3–0 | 3–0 | | 1–3 | 3–0 | 3–1 | 1–3 | 2–3 | 3–0 |
| Pegah Urmia | 3–0 | 1–3 | 0–3 | 2–3 | 3–0 | 3–0 | 3–0 | 3–0 | | 3–0 | 3–0 | 0–3 | 2–3 | 3–1 |
| Persepolis | 3–2 | 0–3 | 0–3 | 3–1 | 2–3 | 3–1 | 2–3 | 0–3 | 2–3 | | 2–3 | 0–3 | 2–3 | 3–1 |
| Petrochimi | 3–0 | 3–0 | 1–3 | 3–0 | 3–0 | 2–3 | 3–0 | 1–3 | 1–3 | 3–2 | | 1–3 | 3–1 | 3–0 |
| Saipa | 3–1 | 3–0 | 3–2 | 3–0 | 3–0 | 3–0 | 3–0 | 1–3 | 2–3 | 3–0 | 3–0 | | 2–3 | 3–2 |
| Sanam | 3–0 | 1–3 | 0–3 | 1–3 | 0–3 | 3–0 | 3–0 | 0–3 | 1–3 | 3–0 | 3–2 | 2–3 | | 3–1 |
| Zob Ahan | 2–3 | 1–3 | 1–3 | 3–2 | 0–3 | 2–3 | 3–0 | 0–3 | 0–3 | 3–2 | 2–3 | 2–3 | 3–2 | |

* Forfeit
