= 1999–2000 Iranian Volleyball Super League =

The following is the final results of the Iranian Volleyball Super League (Velayat Cup) 1999/2000 season.

== Standings ==
			Matches			Sets			Qualification or relegation
Rank	Team	Pts	Pld	W	L	W	L	Ratio	Qualification or relegation
1	Paykan Tehran	29	16	13	3	41	20	2.050	2000 Asian Club Championship
2	Motojen Tabriz	28	16	12	4	42	18	2.333	
3	Sanam Tehran	28	16	12	4	39	18	2.167	
4	Moghavemat Esteghlal Urmia	27	16	11	5	37	26	1.423	
5	Aboumoslem Khorasan	24	16	8	8	33	31	1.065	
6	Persepolis Tehran	23	16	7	9	30	33	0.909	
7	Zob Ahan Isfahan	21	16	5	11	25	36	0.694	
8	Foolad Mobarakeh Isfahan	20	16	4	12	18	42	0.429	
9	Vahdat Sari	16	16	0	16	5	48	0.104	Relegation to the first division
