= 2001–02 Iranian Volleyball Super League =

The following is the final results of the Iranian Volleyball Super League (Velayat Cup) 2001/02 season.

== Standings ==
| | | | Matches | | | Sets | | | Qualification or relegation |
| Rank | Team | Pts | Pld | W | L | W | L | Ratio | Qualification or relegation |
|---|---|---|---|---|---|---|---|---|---|
| 1 | Sanam Tehran | 35 | 18 | 17 | 1 | 52 | 11 | 4.727 | 2002 Asian Club Championship |
| 2 | Paykan Tehran | 33 | 18 | 15 | 3 | 51 | 16 | 3.188 | 2002 Asian Club Championship |
| 3 | PAS Tehran | 30 | 18 | 12 | 6 | 40 | 29 | 1.379 | |
| 4 | Bargh Tehran | 27 | 18 | 9 | 9 | 35 | 35 | 1.000 | |
| 5 | Zob Ahan Isfahan | 27 | 18 | 9 | 9 | 32 | 35 | 0.914 | |
| 6 | Neopan Gonbad | 27 | 18 | 9 | 9 | 30 | 36 | 0.833 | |
| 7 | Persepolis Tehran | 24 | 18 | 6 | 12 | 35 | 37 | 0.946 | |
| 8 | Shahid Bakeri Urmia | 24 | 18 | 7 | 11 | 27 | 40 | 0.675 | |
| 9 | Aboumoslem Khorasan | 22 | 18 | 4 | 14 | 23 | 47 | 0.489 | Relegation to the first division |
| 10 | Abfa Amol | 20 | 18 | 2 | 16 | 12 | 51 | 0.235 | Relegation to the first division |
