= 2000–01 Iranian Volleyball Super League =

The following is the final results of the Iranian Volleyball Super League (Velayat Cup) 2000/01 season.

== Standings ==
			Matches			Qualification or relegation
Rank	Team	Pts	Pld	W	L	Qualification or relegation
1	Sanam Tehran	32	16	16	0	2001 Asian Club Championship
2	Paykan Tehran	27	15	12	3	
3	Aboumoslem Khorasan	27	16	11	5	
4	Persepolis Tehran	25	16	9	7	
5	Bazyaft Tehran	23	16	7	9	
6	Neopan Gonbad	21	15	6	9	
7	Moghavemat Urmia	20	16	4	12	
8	Zob Ahan Isfahan	20	16	4	12	
9	Hesa Isfahan	18	16	2	14	Relegation to the first division
—	Shora Shahr Tabriz	–	–	–	–	Relegation to the first division

- The match between Paykan and Neopan remains unfinished in the fifth set because of the crowd.
- Shora Shahr Tabriz withdrew from the league.
