= Arman Salehi =

Iranian volleyball player (born 1992)

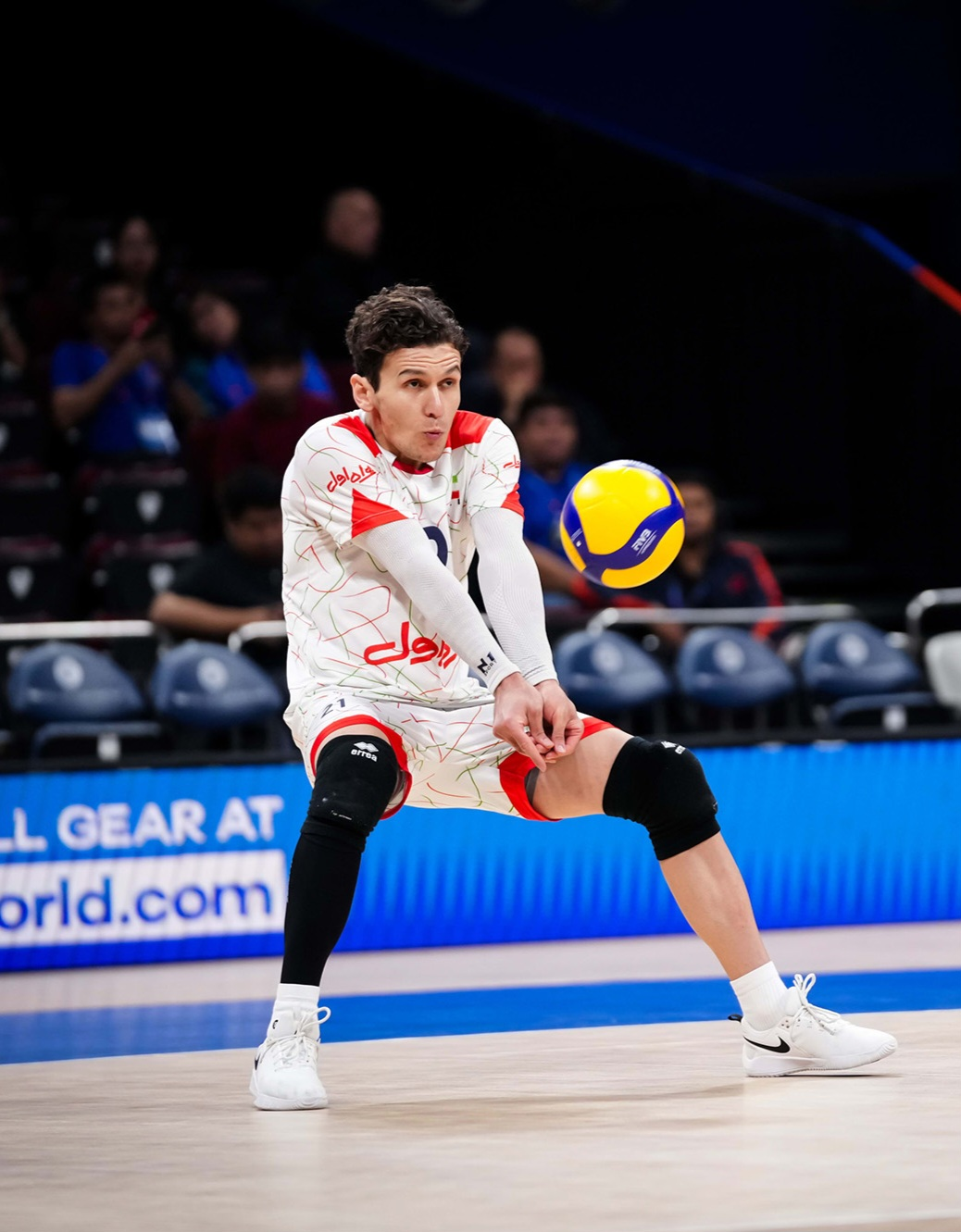
- Arman Salehi with Iran in VNL

Personal information
- Full name: Arman Salehi
- Nationality: (Iran) Iranian
- Born: 29 October 1992 (age 34); Kalaleh County, Iran
- Height: 1.80 m (5 ft 11 in)

Volleyball information
- Position: Libero
- Current club: Shahrdari Gonbad
- Number: 21

National team
2021–	Iran

Arman Salehi (Persian: آرمان صالحی, born 29 October 1992 in Kalaleh, Golestan Province) is an Iranian volleyball player who plays as a libero for Iran and Shahrdari Gonbad VC. He made his maiden appearance at the Olympics representing Iran at the 2020 Summer Olympics.

== Career ==
He currently plays for Shahrdari Gonbad in the Iranian Super League. He was included in Iranian squad for the 2021 FIVB Volleyball Men's Nations League. He is part of the Iranian volleyball squad which is currently competing at the 2020 Summer Olympics.
