= 1998–99 Iranian Volleyball Super League =

The following is the final results of the Iranian Volleyball Super League (Velayat Cup) 1998/99 season.

== Standings ==
			Matches			Qualification or relegation
Rank	Team	Pts	Pld	W	L	Qualification or relegation
1	Paykan Tehran	23	12	11	1	1999 Asian Club Championship
2	Sanam Tehran	22	12	10	2	
3	Zob Ahan Isfahan	20	12	9	3	
4	Moghavemat Urmia	18	12	6	6	
5	Abgineh Qazvin	16	12	4	8	
6	Neka-Choub Sari	13	12	1	11	
7	Neopan Gonbad	13	12	1	11	Relegation to the first division
—	Abrisham Iran Rasht	–	–	–	–	Relegation to the first division

- Abrisham Rasht withdrew from the league.
