= 2006–07 Iranian Volleyball Super League =

The following is the final results of the Iranian Volleyball Super League (The Great Prophet Cup) 2006/07 season.

== Standings ==
			Matches			Set points			Qualification or relegation
Rank	Team	Pts	Pld	W	L	W	L	Ratio	Qualification or relegation
1	Paykan Tehran	41	22	19	3	1863	1577	1.181	2007 Asian Club Championship
2	Gol Gohar Sirjan	38	22	16	6	1908	1775	1.075	
3	Saipa Tehran	37	22	15	7	2091	1954	1.070	
4	Bargh Tehran	36	22	14	8	1816	1841	0.986	
5	Azarpayam Ertebatat Urmia	35	22	13	9	1912	1827	1.047	
6	Etka Tehran	35	22	13	9	2093	2065	1.014	
7	Pegah Urmia	34	22	12	10	2008	1956	1.027	
8	Esteghlal Gonbad	33	22	11	11	1973	2005	0.984	
9	Petrochimi Bandar Imam	32	22	10	12	1895	1941	0.976	
10	Heyat Volleyball Isfahan	28	22	6	16	1854	1958	0.947	
11	Bank Keshavarzi Tehran	25	22	3	19	1714	1965	0.872	Relegation to the first division
12	Aidaneh Chaldoran	22	22	0	22	1680	1952	0.861	Relegation to the first division
