= 2014–15 Iranian Volleyball Super League =

Locations of the 2014–15 season teams

The Iranian Volleyball Super League 2014–15 was the 28th season of the Iranian Volleyball Super League, the highest professional volleyball league in Iran.

== Regular season ==
=== Pool A ===
Rank	Team	Pts	Matches			Details						Sets		
Rank	Team	Pts	Pld	W	L	3–0	3–1	3–2	2–3	1–3	0–3	W	L	Ratio
1	Paykan Tehran	31	12	11	1	5	3	3	1	0	0	35	12	2.917
2	Mizan Khorasan	27	12	8	4	3	5	0	3	1	0	31	17	1.824
3	Shahrdari Tabriz	23	12	8	4	3	3	2	1	2	1	28	19	1.474
4	Javaheri Gonbad	20	12	7	5	3	3	1	0	1	4	22	20	1.100
5	Shahrdari Zahedan	12	12	3	9	1	2	0	3	3	3	18	29	0.621
6	Taavon Gonbad	10	12	4	8	0	1	3	1	4	3	18	31	0.581
7	Erteashat Sanati Tehran	3	12	1	11	0	0	1	1	6	4	11	35	0.314

	ERT	JAV	MIZ	PAY	TAB	ZAH	TAA
Erteashat Sanati		1–3	1–3	1–3	1–3	0–3	2–3
Javaheri Gonbad	3–1		3–2	0–3	1–3	3–0	3–1
Mizan	3–0	3–0		2–3	3–1	3–1	3–1
Paykan	3–0	3–0	3–2		2–3	3–1	3–0
Shahrdari Tabriz	3–0	3–0	1–3	0–3		3–2	2–3
Shahrdari Zahedan	2–3	0–3	3–1	1–3	0–3		3–1
Taavon Gonbad	3–1	0–3	0–3	2–3	1–3	3–2	

=== Pool B ===
Rank	Team	Pts	Matches			Details						Sets		
Rank	Team	Pts	Pld	W	L	3–0	3–1	3–2	2–3	1–3	0–3	W	L	Ratio
1	Shahrdari Urmia	30	12	10	2	9	1	0	0	2	0	32	7	4.571
2	Matin Varamin	28	12	9	3	4	5	0	1	0	2	29	14	2.071
3	Novin Keshavarz Tehran	20	12	7	5	1	3	3	2	0	3	25	24	1.042
4	Vezarat Defa Tehran	18	12	6	6	3	1	2	2	2	2	24	23	1.043
5	Saipa Alborz	14	12	5	7	1	1	3	2	3	2	22	28	0.786
6	Aluminium Al-Mahdi Hormozgan	13	12	4	8	2	0	2	3	2	3	20	28	0.714
7	Pars-Mehr Fars	3	12	1	11	1	0	0	0	2	9	5	33	0.152

	ALU	MAT	NOV	PAR	SAI	URM	VEZ
Aluminium		1–3	1–3	3–0	3–2	0–3	3–2
Matin	3–0		3–0	3–0	3–0	3–1	0–3
Novin Keshavarz	3–2	3–2		3–0	2–3	3–1	3–1
Pars-Mehr	0–3	1–3	3–0		1–3	0–3	0–3
Saipa	3–2	1–3	2–3	3–0		1–3	3–2
Shahrdari Urmia	3–0	3–0	3–0	3–0	3–0		3–0
Vezarat Defa	3–2	1–3	3–2	3–0	3–1	0–3	

== Playoffs ==
- All times are Iran Standard Time (UTC+03:30).
- All series were the best-of-three format, except for the single-match 3rd place playoff and final.

Quarterfinals
A1	Paykan	3	3	—
B4	Vezarat Defa	2	0	—
B2	Matin	1	1	—
A3	Shahrdari Tabriz	3	3	—
B1	Shahrdari Urmia	3	3	—
A4	Javaheri	0	1	—
A2	Mizan	3	3	—
B3	Novin Keshavarz	2	0	—

Semifinals
A1	Paykan	3	2	3
A3	Shahrdari Tabriz	0	3	0
B1	Shahrdari Urmia	3	3	—
A2	Mizan	0	1	—

Final
A1	Paykan	3	—	—
B1	Shahrdari Urmia	2	—	—
3rd place
A3	Shahrdari Tabriz	3	—	—
A2	Mizan	0	—	—

=== Quarterfinals ===
Paykan Tehran vs. Vezarat Defa Tehran

Date	Time		Score		Set 1	Set 2	Set 3	Set 4	Set 5	Total
18 Feb	17:00	Paykan Tehran	3–2	Vezarat Defa Tehran	21–25	25–19	23–25	25–21	15–10	109–100
25 Feb	18:15	Vezarat Defa Tehran	0–3	Paykan Tehran	22–25	21–25	19–25			62–75

Matin Varamin vs. Shahrdari Tabriz

Date	Time		Score		Set 1	Set 2	Set 3	Set 4	Set 5	Total
18 Feb	17:00	Matin Varamin	1–3	Shahrdari Tabriz	17–25	30–28	23–25	22–25		92–103
25 Feb	17:00	Shahrdari Tabriz	3–1	Matin Varamin	25–23	25–15	22–25	25–17		97–80

Shahrdari Urmia vs. Javaheri Gonbad

Date	Time		Score		Set 1	Set 2	Set 3	Set 4	Set 5	Total
18 Feb	17:00	Shahrdari Urmia	3–0	Javaheri Gonbad	25–17	25–19	25–20			75–56
25 Feb	17:00	Javaheri Gonbad	1–3	Shahrdari Urmia	13–25	20–25	25–14	21–25		79–89

Mizan Khorasan vs. Novin Keshavarz Tehran

Date	Time		Score		Set 1	Set 2	Set 3	Set 4	Set 5	Total
18 Feb	17:00	Mizan Khorasan	3–2	Novin Keshavarz Tehran	27–25	25–19	22–25	30–32	15–11	119–112
25 Feb	15:00	Novin Keshavarz Tehran	0–3	Mizan Khorasan	17–25	22–25	23–25			62–75

=== Semifinals ===
Paykan Tehran vs. Shahrdari Tabriz

Date	Time		Score		Set 1	Set 2	Set 3	Set 4	Set 5	Total
08 Mar	17:00	Paykan Tehran	3–0	Shahrdari Tabriz	25–20	25–23	25–21			75–64
11 Mar	17:00	Shahrdari Tabriz	3–2	Paykan Tehran	21–25	25–23	26–28	25–20	16–14	113–110
15 Mar	17:00	Paykan Tehran	3–0	Shahrdari Tabriz	25–21	25–22	28–26			78–69

Shahrdari Urmia vs. Mizan Khorasan

Date	Time		Score		Set 1	Set 2	Set 3	Set 4	Set 5	Total
08 Mar	17:00	Shahrdari Urmia	3–0	Mizan Khorasan	25–22	36–34	25–10			86–66
11 Mar	15:30	Mizan Khorasan	1–3	Shahrdari Urmia	25–18	20–25	23–25	19–25		87–93

=== 3rd place ===
- Venue: Azadi Volleyball Hall, Tehran

Shahrdari Tabriz vs. Mizan Khorasan

Date	Time		Score		Set 1	Set 2	Set 3	Set 4	Set 5	Total
18 Mar	13:00	Mizan Khorasan	0–3	Shahrdari Tabriz	22–25	20–25	22–25			64–75

=== Final ===
- Venue: Azadi Volleyball Hall, Tehran

Paykan Tehran vs. Shahrdari Urmia

Date	Time		Score		Set 1	Set 2	Set 3	Set 4	Set 5	Total
18 Mar	15:30	Shahrdari Urmia	2–3	Paykan Tehran	22–25	25–18	25–20	22–25	12–15	106–103

== Final standings ==
Rank	Team	Qualification or relegation
1	Paykan Tehran	2015 Asian Club Championship
2	Shahrdari Urmia	
3	Shahrdari Tabriz	
4	Mizan Khorasan	
5	Matin Varamin	
6	Novin Keshavarz Tehran	
7	Javaheri Gonbad	
8	Vezarat Defa Tehran	
9	Saipa Alborz	
10	Shahrdari Zahedan	
11	Aluminium Al-Mahdi Hormozgan	
12	Taavon Gonbad	
13	Erteashat Sanati Tehran	Relegation to the first division
14	Pars-Mehr Fars	Relegation to the first division

Ana zı sikm
