= Giti Pasand Isfahan VC =

Giti Pasand Isfahan
- Full name: Sanaye Giti Pasand Isfahan Volleyball Club
- Short name: Giti Pasand
- Founded: 2011
- Dissolved: 2012
- Ground: 17 Shahrivar Arena. Isfahan
- Owner: Sanaye Giti Pasand
- Chairman: (Iran) Ali Taheri
- League: Iranian Super League
- 5th
- Website: Club home page

Sanaye Giti Pasand Isfahan Volleyball Club (Persian: باشگاه والیبال صنایع گیتی پسند اصفهان) was an Iranian professional volleyball team based in Isfahan, Iran. The team is owned by Sanaye Giti Pasand Company . They compete in the Iranian Volleyball Super League.

Giti Pasand was dissolved after Presence one year in volleyball Super League.

== Notable former players ==
- (Australia) Shane Alexander
- (Iran) Mehdi Bazargard
- (Iran) Mohammad Mousavi
- (Iran) Farhad Zarif
- (Iran) Mojtaba Shaban

== Honors ==
National

- Naghshe Jahan Cup:
  - Champions (1): 2011
