= 2002–03 Iranian Volleyball Super League =

The following is the final results of the Iranian Volleyball Super League (Velayat Cup) 2002/03 season.

== Standings ==
			Matches			Sets			Qualification or relegation
Rank	Team	Pts	Pld	W	L	W	L	Ratio	Qualification or relegation
1	Paykan Tehran	38	20	18	2	57	10	5.700	2003 Asian Club Championship
2	Sanam Tehran	38	20	18	2	56	16	3.500	
3	PAS Tehran	35	20	15	5	50	28	1.786	
4	Bargh Tehran	32	20	12	8	43	30	1.433	
5	Ghand Shirvan	28	20	8	12	35	39	0.897	
6	Narenjestan Noor	28	20	8	12	33	44	0.750	
7	Loulehsazi Ahvaz	28	20	8	12	34	47	0.723	
8	Neopan Gonbad	28	20	8	12	29	46	0.630	
9	Zob Ahan Isfahan	27	20	7	13	29	44	0.659	
10	Saipa Azin Tehran	27	20	7	13	29	50	0.580	
11	Samansoo Urmia	21	20	1	19	16	58	0.276	Relegation to the first division

- 2003 Asian Club Championship was canceled due to the outbreak of SARS.
