= 2003–04 Iranian Volleyball Super League =

The following is the final results of the Iranian Volleyball Super League (Velayat Cup) 2003/04 season.

== Standings ==
			Matches			Sets			Qualification or relegation
Rank	Team	Pts	Pld	W	L	W	L	Ratio	Qualification or relegation
1	Sanam Tehran	36	20	16	4	52	25	2.080	2004 Asian Club Championship
2	Paykan Tehran	34	20	14	6	49	25	1.960	2004 Asian Club Championship
3	Pegah Urmia	34	20	14	6	50	28	1.786	
4	PAS Tehran	32	20	12	8	46	33	1.394	
5	Bargh Tehran	32	20	12	8	42	33	1.273	
6	Neopan Gonbad	32	20	12	8	45	38	1.184	
7	Ghand Shirvan	30	20	10	10	34	38	0.895	
8	Foolad Saba Isfahan	27	20	7	13	28	49	0.571	
9	Dokhaniat Tehran	26	20	6	14	30	48	0.625	
10	Saipa Tehran	24	20	4	16	31	56	0.554	
11	Loulehsazi Ahvaz	23	20	3	17	23	56	0.411	Relegation to the first division
