= 2004–05 Iranian Volleyball Super League =

The following is the final results of the Iranian Volleyball Super League (Velayat Cup) 2004/05 season.

== Regular season ==
=== Pool A ===
Rank	Team
1	Sanam Tehran
2	PAS Tehran
3	Azarpayam Ertebatat Urmia
4	Petrochimi Bandar Imam
5	Dokhaniat Tehran
6	Azad University Tabriz
7	Zob Ahan Isfahan
8	Padisan Gonbad
9	Elmi Karbordi Payam Shahrekord
10	Palayesh Naft Kermanshah

=== Pool B ===
Rank	Team
1	Pegah Urmia
2	Paykan Tehran
3	Bargh Tehran
4	Saipa Tehran
5	Neopan Gonbad
6	Etka Qom
7	Rah Ahan Khorasan
8	Vahdat Sari
WD	Khousheh Sabz Fars

== Playoffs ==
Quarterfinals
A1	Sanam	3	3	6
B4	Saipa	1	0	1
B2	Paykan	3	3	6
A3	Azarpayam	0	0	0
B1	Pegah	3	3	6
A4	Petrochimi	0	0	0
A2	PAS	3	1	4
B3	Bargh Tehran	2	3	5

Semifinals
A1	Sanam	3	2	5
B2	Paykan	0	3	3
B1	Pegah	3	3	6
B3	Bargh Tehran	1	0	1

Final
A1	Sanam	3	3	6
B1	Pegah	0	1	1
3rd place
B2	Paykan	3	3	6
B3	Bargh Tehran	0	0	0

5th–8th places
B4	Saipa	3	3	6
A3	Azarpayam	2	2	4
A4	Petrochimi	2	0	2
A2	PAS	3	3	6

5th place
B4	Saipa	1	1	2
A2	PAS	3	3	6
7th place
A3	Azarpayam	1	—	—
A4	Petrochimi	3	—	—

=== Quarterfinals ===
Sanam vs. Saipa

Date		Score		Set 1	Set 2	Set 3	Set 4	Set 5	Total
01 Feb	Saipa Tehran	1–3	Sanam Tehran	25–23	20–25	23–25	15–25		83–98
05 Feb	Sanam Tehran	3–0	Saipa Tehran	25–23	25–23	25–22			75–68

Paykan vs. Azarpayam

Date		Score		Set 1	Set 2	Set 3	Set 4	Set 5	Total
01 Feb	Azarpayam Ertebatat Urmia	0–3	Paykan Tehran	21–25	24–26	18–25			63–76
06 Feb	Paykan Tehran	3–0	Azarpayam Ertebatat Urmia	25–18	27–25	25–19			77–62

Pegah vs. Petrochimi

Date		Score		Set 1	Set 2	Set 3	Set 4	Set 5	Total
01 Feb	Petrochimi Bandar Imam	0–3	Pegah Urmia	19–25	18–25	17–25			54–75
06 Feb	Pegah Urmia	3–0	Petrochimi Bandar Imam	25–22	25–23	25–15			75–60

PAS vs. Bargh Tehran

Date		Score		Set 1	Set 2	Set 3	Set 4	Set 5	Total
01 Feb	Bargh Tehran	2–3	PAS Tehran	25–27	25–23	22–25	25–21	9–15	106–111
05 Feb	PAS Tehran	1–3	Bargh Tehran	22–25	22–25	33–31	23–25		100–106

=== Semifinals ===
Sanam vs. Saipa

Date		Score		Set 1	Set 2	Set 3	Set 4	Set 5	Total
10 Feb	Sanam Tehran	3–0	Paykan Tehran	26–24	25–17	25–23			76–64
15 Feb	Paykan Tehran	3–2	Sanam Tehran	15–25	25–20	25–23	20–25	17–15	102–108

Pegah vs. Bargh Tehran

Date		Score		Set 1	Set 2	Set 3	Set 4	Set 5	Total
10 Feb	Pegah Urmia	3–1	Bargh Tehran	25–23	25–21	22–25	25–22		97–91
15 Feb	Bargh Tehran	0–3	Pegah Urmia	27–29	21–25	21–25			69–79

=== Final ===
Sanam vs. Pegah

Date		Score		Set 1	Set 2	Set 3	Set 4	Set 5	Total
22 Feb	Sanam Tehran	3–0	Pegah Urmia	25–21	25–21	25–18			75–60
28 Feb	Pegah Urmia	1–3	Sanam Tehran	25–27	25–15	20–25	20–25		90–92

== Final standings ==
Rank	Team	Qualification or relegation
1	Sanam Tehran	2005 Asian Club Championship
2	Pegah Urmia	
3	Paykan Tehran	
4	Bargh Tehran	
5	PAS Tehran	
6	Saipa Tehran	
7	Petrochimi Bandar Imam	
8	Azarpayam Ertebatat Urmia	

- Sanam later withdrew from the Asian championship and replaced by Saipa.
