= 2007–08 Iranian Volleyball Super League =

The following is the final results of the Iranian Volleyball Super League (National unity and Islamic solidarity Cup) 2007/08 season.

== Standings ==
			Matches			Points ratio	Sets			Qualification or relegation
Rank	Team	Pts	Pld	W	L	Points ratio	W	L	Ratio	Qualification or relegation
1	Paykan Tehran	45	24	21	3	1.158	66	18	3.667	2008 Asian Club Championship
2	Saipa Tehran	44	24	20	4	1.089	64	28	2.286	
3	Pegah Urmia	42	24	18	6	1.091	58	32	1.813	
4	Pardis Mottahed Qazvin	39	24	15	9	1.046	52	36	1.444	
5	Petrochimi Bandar Imam	36	24	12	12	1.025	51	49	1.041	
6	Shahrdari Hamedan	36	24	12	12	0.980	43	51	0.843	
7	Bank Saderat Iran Mashhad	34	24	10	14	1.000	41	52	0.788	
8	Etka Tehran	34	24	10	14	0.992	47	53	0.887	
9	Steel Azin Tehran	34	24	10	14	0.981	43	52	0.827	Relegation to the first division
10	Esteghlal Gonbad	33	24	9	15	0.929	38	56	0.679	
11	Sang Ahan Bafgh	32	24	8	16	0.969	39	53	0.736	
12	Gol Gohar Sirjan	29	24	5	19	0.902	30	64	0.469	
13	Heyat Volleyball Urmia	29	24	6	18	0.887	33	61	0.541	Relegation to the first division

- Steel Azin relegated as the worst team from Tehran.

== Results ==
	BSI	EST	ETK	GOL	HVU	PAR	PAY	PEG	PET	SAI	SNG	HAM	STL
Bank Saderat		1–3	2–3	3–0	3–0*	0–3	1–3	1–3	3–1	1–3	1–3	3–0	3–1
Esteghlal Gonbad	2–3		3–2	3–2	3–0	0–3	3–1	1–3	3–0	1–3	3–2	3–1	1–3
Etka	2–3	3–0		3–2	3–0	3–2	0–3	1–3	2–3	2–3	3–1	3–0	3–0
Gol Gohar	3–2	3–1	2–3		3–2	0–3	0–3	3–0	0–3	0–3	3–2	1–3	1–3
HV Urmia	3–1	2–3	3–2	3–1		2–3	0–3	0–3	3–1	1–3	0–3	2–3	3–2
Pardis	2–3	3–0	3–0	3–1	3–1		0–3	1–3	3–1	3–2	3–1	3–0	3–1
Paykan	3–0	3–0	3–1	3–0	3–0	3–0		3–0	3–1	3–1	3–1	3–0	3–1
Pegah Urmia	3–0	3–1	3–2	3–0	3–0	3–1	3–2		3–2	2–3	3–0	1–3	3–0
Petrochimi	0–3	3–2	2–3	3–0	3–2	3–0	1–3	3–1		3–0	3–0	2–3	2–3
Saipa	3–0	3–0	3–1	3–0	3–1	3–1	3–0	3–0	3–2		3–1	3–1	3–1
Sang Ahan	2–3	3–0	3–0	3–1	0–3	3–0	2–3	0–3	2–3	0–3		3–1	1–3
Shahrdari Hamedan	3–1	3–1	3–1	3–2	3–1	0–3	0–3	0–3	2–3	3–1	2–3		3–1
Steel Azin	3–0	3–1	3–1	3–2	3–1	0–3	0–3	2–3	2–3	1–3	3–0	1–3	

* Forfeit
