= Tehran House of Volleyball =

Volleyball arena in Tehran, Iran

House of Volleyball
- Interactive map of House of Volleyball
- Full name: Tehran House of Volleyball
- Location: Tehran, Iran
- Coordinates: 35.712°N 51.396°E
- Owner: Iran Volleyball Federation
- Operator: Tehran Volleyball Committee
- Capacity: 1,500

Tenants
- Paykan Tehran; Saipa Tehran

Tehran House of Volleyball is a volleyball arena located in Tehran, Iran.

This arena has a capacity of 1,500 and is located on Hejab Street. This arena hosts games of Tehran-based teams in the Iranian Volleyball League.
