= Smilen Mlyakov =

Bulgarian volleyball player

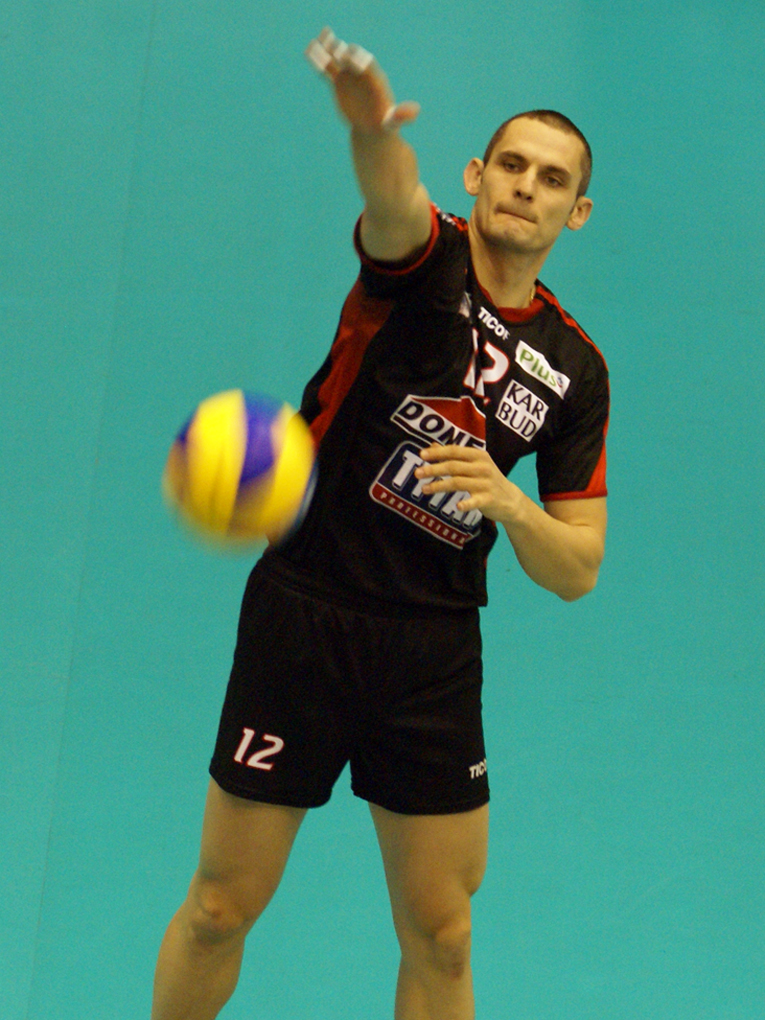

Personal information
- Nationality: Bulgaria
- Born: 17 June 1981 (age 45); Sofia, Bulgaria
- Height: 2.00 m (6 ft 7 in)
- Weight: 98 kg (216 lb)
- Spike: 365 cm (144 in)
- Block: 336 cm (132 in)

National team
Bulgaria

Smilen Mlyakov (Bulgarian: Смилен Мляков; born 17 June 1981 in Sofia) is a Bulgarian volleyball player.

== Career ==
Mlyakov has played for CSKA Royal Cake and Levski Ball in his country as well as had spells in Italy, Poland and Iran. He is a former member of his country's national team.
