= Mehdi Bazargard =

Iranian volleyball player

Medal record

Representing Iran

Men's volleyball

Asian Championship
Gold medal – first place	2011 Tehran	Team

Seyed Mehdi Bazargarde Shalkohimojarad (born 16 March 1979, Tehran, Iran) is an Iranian volleyball player who plays for Shahrdari Urmia.
