= Shahrdari Varamin VC =

Iranian volleyball team

Shahrdari Varamin
- Full name: Shahrdari Varamin Volleyball Club
- Founded: 2012; 8 years ago as Matin Varamin
- Ground: Golabbasi Arena, Varamin
- Chairman: Alireza Fadakar
- Manager: (Iran) Mostafa Karkhaneh
- Captain: (Iran) Mehdi Bazargard
- League: Iranian Super League
- 2020–21: 5th
- Website: Club home page

Uniforms
Home	Away

Shahrdari Varamin Volleyball Club (Persian: باشگاه والیبال شهرداری ورامین, Bâshgâh-e Vâlibâl-e Shahrdâri-ye Varâmin), formerly known as Matin Varamin for sponsorship reasons, is a professional volleyball team based in Varamin, Iran. They compete in the Iranian Volleyball Super League.

== History ==
=== Establishment ===
Shahrdari Varamin Volleyball Club was founded in 2012 in Varamin, Iran, by the Matin Engineering Company. Matin was placed in the Iranian Super League for the 2012–13 season.

=== 2012–13 ===
In their first season Matin finished 2nd in the league with 42 points thus securing a play-off spot. In the semi-final round Matin defeated Saipa Alborz two games to one and advanced to the final, in which they faced Kalleh. Matin won the first game, but Kalleh bounced back winning the remaining two games and winning the Super League.

=== 2013–14 ===
In their second season, Matin again finished second in the league. This time the play-offs included a quarter-final phase, and Matin were paired up with Novin Keshavarz in which they comfortably won. In the semi-final Matin faced Mizan Khorasan, Matin again easily defeated their opposition and advanced to the final and for the second straight year they faced Kalleh Mazandaran. The finals was only a one match game in which Matin won three sets to two, thus winning their first title and clinching a spot in the Asian Club Championships. Matin easily won their group and advanced to the quarter-finals in which they defeated Chinese Taipei three sets to one. Matin then faced Beijing Motors in the semi-final, they easily beat Beijing three sets to none. In the final they were paired up with Persian Gulf rivals Al Rayyan of Qatar. Matin proved to be no match for Al Rayyan as they defeated the Qatari team three sets to one. By winning the Asian Club Championships they secured a spot in the World Club Championships. In their first group match, Matin were defeated three sets to none by Brazilian club Sada Cruzeiro. However, in their second match they bounced back defeating Mets of Cuba three sets to none. In their final group match, Matin faced Belogorie of Russia, a match they had to win to advance out of the group; they were defeated three set to one, and finished fifth overall.

=== 2018–19 ===
After winning the 2018–19 Iranian Volleyball Super League, Shahrdari Varamin qualified for the 2019 Asian men's Club Volleyball Championship. Competing in Pool B, the team won all 3 of their matches defeating Indonesian Polri Samator, and Turkeminstan's representative Galkan. They finished their pool matches defeating Sri Lanka Ports Authority 3–0. In the classification round, Shahrdari Varamin was placed in Pool F along with Panasonic Panthers, Sri Lanka Ports Authority, TP.HCM. Their only loss throughout the tournament came against Panasonic Panthers when they lost 2–3. They moved on to the quarterfinals as the second team from Pool F. They defeated Taichung Bank 3–0 in the quarterfinals, Chennai Spartans 3–1 in the semifinals, and took revenge against Panasonic Panthers in the final match defeating them 3–2 to win their second Asian Club Volleyball Championship. As a result of winning the Asian Club Championship, Shahrdari Varamin would represent the AVC in the 2019 Club World Championship, but they were banned by the FIVB for this tournament and replaced by Al-Rayyan.

==== Squad ====
- 1. (Iran) Alireza Jalali
- 2. (Iran) Mehrad Ragani Babaei
- 3. (Iran) Mohammad Kashkami Zarchoub Fallah
- 4. (Iran) Behnam Ebrahimi
- 5. (Iran) Arash Seyed Taghavi
- 6. (Iran) Mohammad Razipoor
- 7. (Iran) Purya Samnani Fayazi
- 8. (Iran) Ahsanollah Shirkavand
- 11. (Iran) Rasoul Najafi
- 12. (Iran) Ehsan Daneshdoust
- 13. (Iran) Amin Razavi
- 14. (Iran) Parviz Pezeshki
- 17. (Iran) Majid Torabadi
- 18. (Iran) Javad Hosseinabadi

== Club names ==
The club has had several names for sponsorship reasons:

- 2012–2016: Matin Varamin
- 2016–2017: Matin Salehin Varamin
- 2017–present: Shahrdari Varamin

== Current squad ==
- 1. (Iran) Alireza Nasr Esfahani
- 2. (Iran) Mostafa Sharifat
- 5. (Iran) Mehdi Bazargard
- 6. (Iran) Hesan Bakhsheshi
- 7. (Iran) Hamzeh Zarini
- 8. (Iran) Ahsanollah Shirkavand
- 9. (Iran) Ali Asghar Razmfar
- 10. (Iran) Amir Ghafour
- 12. (Iran) Mehdi Faraji
- 14. (Iran) Arash Keshavarzi
- 15. (Greece) Andreas Fragkos
- 16. (Iran) Shahin Mofidi
- 17. (Iran) Mohammad Taher Vadi
- 18. (Iran) Saber Narimannejad
- 20. (Iran) Behnam Ebrahimi
- Heach coach: (Iran) Behrouz Ataei
- Assistant coach: (Serbia) Slobodan Prakljačić

== Honours ==
- Iranian Super League

Winners (2): 2014, 2019
Runners-up (1): 2013

- Asian Club Championship

Winners (2): 2014, 2019

- Club World Championship

Fifth place (1): 2014
