= Barij Essence Kashan VC =

Iranian professional volleyball team

Barij Essence Kashan
- Full name: Barij Essence Kashan
- Short name: Barij Essence
- Dissolved: 2014; 11 years ago
- Chairman: Taghi Hejazi
- League: Iranian Super League
- 2013–14: 8th
- Website: Club home page

Uniforms
Home	Away

Barij Essence Kashan Volleyball Club (Persian: باشگاه والیبال باریج اسانس کاشان) was an Iranian professional volleyball team based in Kashan. The team competed in the Iranian Volleyball Super League.

== Notable former players ==
- (Brazil) Rodrigo Santana
- (Iran) Mehdi Mahdavi
- (Iran) Alireza Nadi
- (Iran) Amir Ghafour
- (Iran) Farhad Ghaemi
- (Iran) Armin Tashakkori
