= Shahrdari Gonbad VC =

Shahrdari Gonbad
- Full name: Shahrdari Gonbad Kavus Volleyball Club
- Short name: Gonbad
- Founded: 2011; 9 years ago
- Ground: Olympic Arena, Gonbad-e Kavus
- Chairman: Mohammad Mohammadi
- Manager: Ramin Babai
- League: Iranian Super League
- 2020–21: 5th
- Website: Club home page

Uniforms
Home	Away

Shahrdari Gonbad Volleyball Club (Persian: باشگاه والیبال شهرداری گنبد, Bashgah-e Valibal-e Shiherdari Gânbed) is an Iranian professional volleyball team based in Gonbad-e Kavus, Iran. They compete in the Iranian Volleyball Super League.

== Notable former players ==
- (Iran) Farhad Ghaemi
- (Venezuela) Carlos Tejeda
- (Slovakia) Marek Mikula
