= Mizan Khorasan VC =

Mizan Khorasan
- Full name: Mizan Khorasan
- Short name: Mizan
- Founded: 2010
- Chairman: Ehsan Helmi
- Manager: Jabbar Ghouchannejad
- League: Iranian Super League
- 2014–15: 4th
- Website: Club home page

Uniforms
| Home | Away |

Mizan Khorasan Volleyball Club (Persian: باشگاه والیبال میزان خراسان) is an Iranian professional volleyball team based in Mashhad, Iran. They compete in the Iranian Volleyball Super League.

== History ==
Mizan Khorasan Volleyball Club was founded in 2010 in Mashhad, Iran with the help of Khorasan Razavi Volleyball Association. Mizan first started competing in the Iranian Super League in 2012.

== Current squad ==
- 3. (Iran) Sahab Delghandi
- 5. (Iran) Mohsen Ekhtiarabadi
- 7. (Iran) Mojtaba Yousefi
- 8. (Iran) Mohammad Valipour
- 9. (Iran) Amir Ramshini
- 10. (Iran) Shahrouz Homayounfar
- 11. (Iran) Rahman Davoudi
- 13. (Iran) Soheil Ahmadi
- 14. (Iran) Amin Alavi
- 15. (Iran) Ebrahim Yolmeh
- 16. (Iran) Ali Jafari
- 17. (Bulgaria) Teodor Bogdanov
- 18. (Iran) Mohammad Taher Vadi
- 19. (Iran) Sahand Allahverdian
- 20. (Iran) Alireza Mobasheri
- Head coach: (Iran) Jabbar Ghouchannejad
- Assistant coach: (Iran) Bagher Soleimannejad
