= Paykan Tehran VC =

Iranian professional volleyball team

Paykan Tehran
- Full name: Paykan Tehran Volleyball Club
- Short name: Paykan
- Founded: 1966; 56 years ago
- Ground: Tehran House of Volleyball, Tehran
- President: Rasoul khatibi
- League: Iranian Super League
- 2021–22: Play off
- Website: Club home page

Uniforms
Home	Away

Paykan Tehran Volleyball Club (Persian: باشگاه والیبال پیکان تـهران, Bâshgâh-e Vâlibâl-e Peykân-e Tehrân) is an Iranian professional volleyball team based in Tehran, Iran. The team is owned by Iran Khodro, an Iranian automobile manufacturer, and it competes in the Iranian Volleyball Super League. Paykan VC is the volleyball club of the multisport Paykan Sport Club.

== History ==
=== Establishment ===
Paykan Tehran Volleyball Club was founded in 1967 in Tehran, Iran, as a part of Paykan Sports Club. They started playing matches in 1969 when they played a series of exhibition games against European opponents.

=== Success ===
They are the most successful volleyball club in Iran with 12 league titles. Paykan is also the most decorated club in Asian volleyball, as they have won the Asian Club Championships a record eight times. In 2010 Paykan placed third in the World Club Championships.

== Arena ==
Sapco is the home arena for Paykan and hosts all competitive and official matches. The club uses Number 1 Mix-Use Complex as its training location and also hosts friendly matches for the club.

== Team rosters ==
=== 2015/2016 ===
- Team manager: (Iran) Amir Mehdi Nafar
- Heach coach: (Iran) Mohammad Torkashvand

Team roster - season 2015/2016
No.	Name	Position
1	(Iran) Salim Cheperli	Outside hitter
2	(Iran) Reza Abedini	Middle blocker
3	(Iran) Vali Alipour	Middle blocker
4	(Iran) Javad Karimi (C)	Setter
5	(Iran) Esmaeil Mosafer	Outside hitter
6	(Iran) Mehrdad Sheibanimehr	Middle blocker
7	(Iran) Ali Nodouzpour	Setter
8	(Iran) Shayan Shahsavan	Outside hitter
9	(Iran) Mohammadreza Mashhadi	Outside hitter
10	(Iran) Alireza Shahali	Opposite hitter
12	(Iran) Rahman Taghizadeh	Middle blocker
14	(Iran) Pourya Yali	Opposite hitter
19	(Iran) Mohammadreza Moazen	Libero

=== 2014/2015 ===
- Team manager: (Iran) Amir Mehdi Nafar
- Heach coach: (Iran) Peyman Akbari

Team roster - season 2014/2015
No.	Name	Position
1	(Iran) Saman Faezi	Middle blocker
2	(Netherlands) Nico Freriks	Setter
3	(Iran) Amir Hosseini (C)	Setter
4	(Iran) Mohammad Javad Manavinejad	Outside hitter
5	(Iran) Farhad Ghaemi	Outside hitter
6	(Iran) Mohammad Mousavi	Middle blocker
7	(Iran) Ali Hossein	Libero
8	(Iran) Mehrdad Sheibanimehr	Middle blocker
10	(Iran) Sajjad Dehnavi	Middle blocker
11	(Iran) Mojtaba Mirzajanpour	Outside hitter
12	(Iran) Mojtaba Gholizadeh	Outside hitter
14	(Iran) Reza Safaei	Opposite hitter
16	(Iran) Ali Asghar Mirhosseini	Libero
17	(Iran) Reza Ghara	Opposite hitter

== Notable former players ==
- (Iran) Farhad Ghaemi
- (Iran) Behnam Mahmoudi
- (Iran) Mohammad Mousavi
- (Iran) Alireza Nadi
- (Iran) Saeid Marouf
- (France) Philippe Barca-Cysique
- (Netherlands) Nico Freriks
- (Belgium) Simon Van De Voorde
- (Italy) Valerio Vermiglio
- (Bulgaria) Nikolay Nikolov
- (France) Earvin N'Gapeth
- (Netherlands) Nimir Abdel-Aziz

== Honours ==
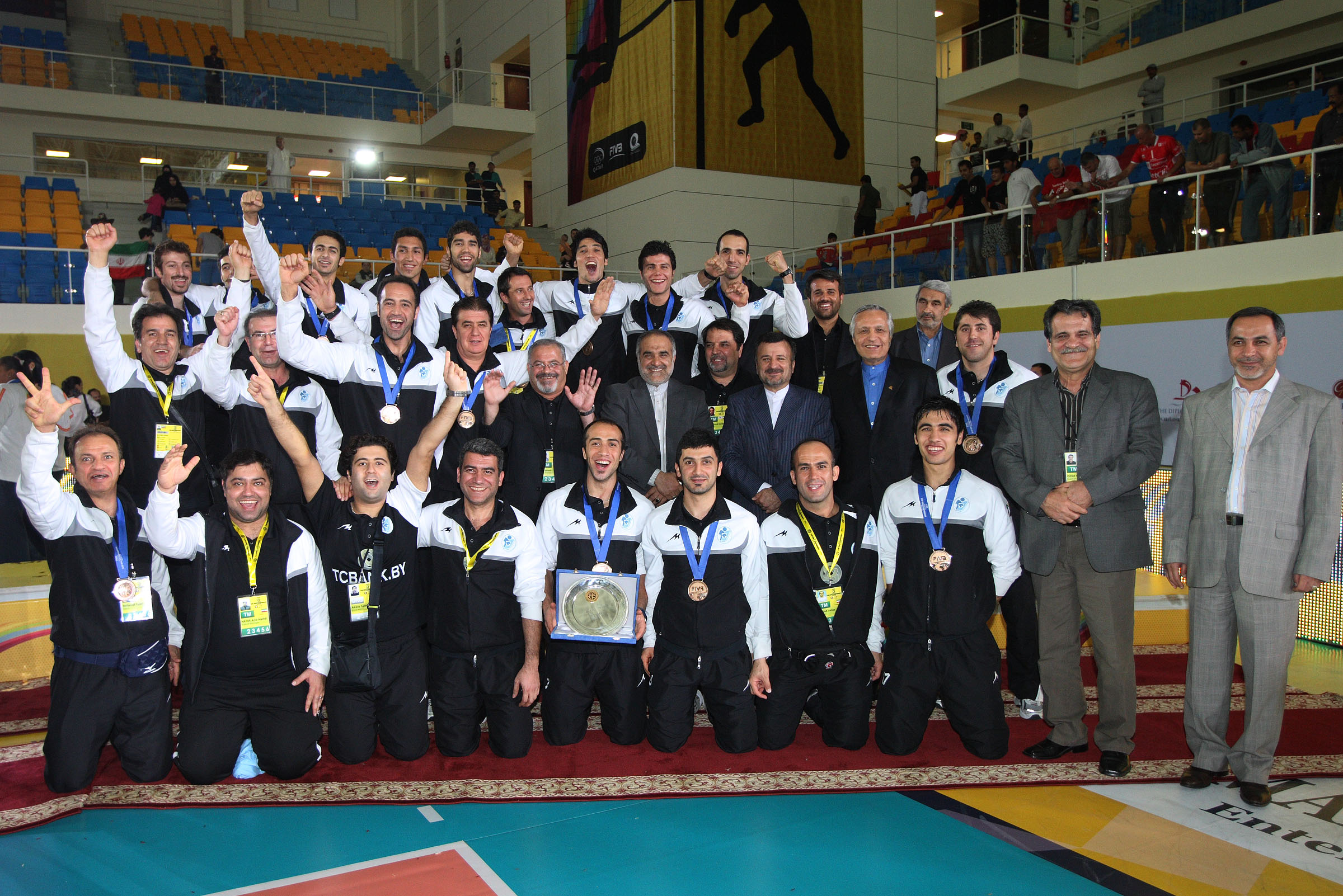
The 2010 Men's Club World Championship bronze medallists

- Iranian Super League

Winners (12): 1997, 1998, 1999, 2000, 2003, 2006, 2007, 2008, 2009, 2010, 2011, 2015
Runners-up (6): 2001, 2002, 2004, 2016, 2017, 2022
Third place (4): 2005, 2012, 2013, 2018

- Asian Club Championship

Winners (8): 2002, 2006, 2007, 2008, 2009, 2010, 2011, 2022
Runners-up (2): 2000, 2004
Third place (2): 1999, 2015

- World Club Championship

Third place (1): 2010
Fourth place (2): 2009, 2015

== See also ==
- Shahrdari Varamin VC
- Shahrdari Urmia VC
