= Kalleh Mazandaran VC =

Kalleh Mazandaran
- Full name: Kalleh Mazandaran
- Short name: Kalleh
- Nickname: Mazandaran Tigers; Galactic; Kalleh Shahre Amol
- Founded: 1989; 31 years ago
- Ground: Payambar Azam Arena, Amol (Capacity: 2,500)
- Chairman: Bahman Soleimani
- Manager: Behrouz Ataei
- Captain: Rasoul Aghchehli
- League: Iranian Super League
- 2018–19: 3rd
- Website: Club home page

Kalleh Mazandaran Volleyball Club (Persian: باشگاه والیبال کاله مازندران, Bâshgâh-e Vâlibâl-e Kâle-ye Mâzandarân) was an Iranian professional volleyball team based in Amol, Iran. The team was owned by Solico Group - Kalleh Company. They competed in the Iranian Volleyball Super League.

The Payambar Azam Arena in Amol, Iran was the home ground of Kalleh. The team has won the Iranian Super League twice and the Asian Club Championship once. Kalleh was dissolved in 2014 due to financial issues but was refounded a year later.

== History ==
In 1989 Kalleh Mazandaran Volleyball Club was established in Amol, Iran. Kalleh competed in the Mazandaran Provincial League until 2007 in which they were promoted to the Iranian Super League from the 1st Division. In 2012, for the first time in club history, Kalleh won the Iranian Super League title and secured a spot in the Asian Club Championship, in which they finished third. The following year Kalleh won the Super League and won the Asian Club Championship for the first time in the club's history. They got first in 2013 for the FIVB Club World Championship.

== Symbol ==
The Mazandaran tiger is a symbol of the club. The club colors are green and yellow/gold.This club has a large fanbase and is known internationally.

== Stadium ==
The team started construction on a private 10,000 seat stadium in 2014.

== Notable former players ==
- (Argentina) Rodrigo Quiroga
- (Bulgaria) Krasimir Gaydarski
- (Bulgaria) Smilen Mlyakov
- (Bulgaria) Stanislav Petkov
- (Iran) Saeid Marouf
- (Iran) Alireza Nadi
- (Iran) Farhad Nazari Afshar
- (Iran) Adel Gholami
- (Iran) Mohammad Mousavi
- (Serbia) Vlado Petković
- (Netherlands) Nico Freriks
- (Iran) Farhad Ghaemi
- (Iran) Farhad Zarif

== Honors ==
- Iranian Super League

Winners (2): 2012, 2013
Runners-up (1): 2014
Third place (3): 2010, 2011, 2019

- Iranian First Volleyball League

Winners (1): 2009

- Asian Club Championship

Winners (1): 2013
Third place (1): 2012

- Club World Championship

Seventh place (1): 2013

- The Iran Cup

Winners (2): 2011, 2013

- Ramadan Cup

Winners (1): 1990

== Management ==
Position	Staff
President	Bahman Soleimani
Supervisor and Vice-president	Hassan Mansouri

== Kit / Sponsor ==
Period	Kit Manufacturer	Shirt Sponsor
2007–2009	(Iran) Taban	Kalleh Sports Clubs / Solico / فیله
2009–2013	(Iran) Merooj - (Germany) Uhlsport	Kalleh Sports Club / Solico
2013-	(Iran) Merooj - (Iran) IDEAL	Kalleh Sports Club / Solico / فیله / آریس / Shams / Lactivia
