= Aluminium Al-Mahdi Hormozgan VC =

Iranian professional volleyball team

Aluminium Al-Mahdi Hormozgan
- Full name: Aluminium Al-Mahdi Hormozgan
- Short name: Aluminium
- Founded: 2006
- Ground: Fajr Hall
- Chairman: (Iran) Mohammad Reza Sadid
- Manager: (Iran) Nasser Shahnazi
- League: Iranian Super League
- 2015–16: 11th

Uniforms
Home	Away

Aluminium Al-Mahdi Hormozgan Volleyball Club (Persian: باشگاه والیبال آلومینیوم المهدی هرمزگان) is an Iranian professional volleyball team based in Bandar Abbas, Iran.

== History ==
Aluminium Hormozgan Volleyball Club was established in 2006 under the guidance of the Aluminium Hormozgan Company. Soon after its establishment Aluminium became champions of Hormozgan and were promoted to the 3rd Division, but they bought the licence of another club and were placed in the 1st Division. After a while Aluminium was promoted to the Iranian Super League.

== Team Rosters ==
=== 2015/2016 ===
- Heach coach: (Iran) Nasser Shahnazi
- Assistant coach: (Iran) Abdolraouf Bastegani
- Manager: (Iran) Sedigh Salehizadeh

Team roster - season 2015/2016
No.	Name	Position
1	(Iran) Masoud Ramezani	Outside hitter
2	(Iran) Hossein Hassanpour	Middle blocker
3	(Iran) Moein Rahimi	Middle blocker
4	(Iran) Farhad Salafzoun	Setter
5	(Iran) Davoud Zareeian	Outside hitter
6	(Iran) Mohammad Bagheri	Middle blocker
7	(Iran) Edris Daneshfar	Setter
8	(Iran) Yashar Shahini	Outside hitter
9	(Iran) Alireza Hanifnejad	Outside hitter
10	(Iran) Arash Taghavi	Opposite hitter
12	(Iran) Ebrahim Darvishizadeh	Middle blocker
13	(Iran) Keivan Saraninejad	Middle blocker
14	(Iran) Reza Safaei	Opposite hitter
15	(Serbia) Ivan Borovnjak	Opposite hitter
16	(Iran) Sadegh Zareei	Libero
17	(Iran) Saeid Kamali	Libero
18	(Iran) Javad Hosseinabadi	Middle blocker
