= Novin Keshavarz Tehran VC =

Iranian professional volleyball team

Novin Keshavarz Tehran
- Short name: Novin Keshavarz
- Owner: Keshavarzi Bank
- Chairman: Masoud Atashi
- Manager: Masoud Armat
- League: Iranian Super League
- 2014–15: 6th
- Website: Club home page

Uniforms
Home	Away

Novin Keshavarz Tehran Volleyball Club (Persian: باشگاه والیبال نوین کشاورز تهران) also known as Bank Keshavarzi is an Iranian professional volleyball team based in Tehran, Iran.

== Squads ==
=== 2013 squad ===
- 1. (Iran) Bahman Jahandideh
- 3. (Iran) Mohammad Reza Hosseini-Pouya
- 4. (Iran) Hamed Bagherpour
- 5. (Iran) Zli Zolfaghari
- 6. (Iran) Hamid Jafari
- 7. (Iran) Mohammad Reza Moazzen
- 8. (Iran) Mehdi Parastari
- 9. (Iran) Mohammad Reza Heidari
- 10. (Iran) Asghar Najafi
- 11. (Iran) Khosro Farhadi
- 12. (Iran) Saeid Shiroud
- 13. (Iran) Hamid Hamoudi
- 14. (Iran) Parviz Pezeshki
- 15. (Iran) Amir Golriz
- 16. (Iran) Mehdi Babaei
- 17. (Iran) Masoud Eftekhari
- 18. (Iran) Ramin Bigdeli
- Heach coach: (Iran) Masoud Armat
- Assistant coach: (Iran) Mehdi Aboutorabi
- Team manager: (Iran) Mahmoud Khordbin
