= Persepolis VC =

Iranian volleyball club

Persepolis
- Full name: Persepolis Volleyball Club
- Short name: Persepolis
- Founded: 1963; 63 years ago
- Dissolved: 2010; 16 years ago Refounded: 2026
- Ground: Tehran House of Volleyball (Capacity: 1,500)
- President: Peyman Haddadi
- Head coach: Reza Safaei
- Captain: Naser Rahimipanah
- League: Iranian Volleyball First Division League
- 2026–27: .
- Website: Club home page

Uniforms
Home	Away

Persepolis Volleyball Club (Persian: باشگاه والیبال پرسپولیس) is an Iranian Volleyball club based in Tehran, Iran.

== Players ==
=== Current players ===
Persepolis Volleyball Club roster
No.	Pos.	Nat.	Name
1	MB	(Iran)	Salar Bahaoddini
2	L	(Iran)	Kourosh Karami
4	S	(Iran)	Ali Nodouzpour
6	MB	(Iran)	Mirreza Alizadeh
7	MB	(Iran)	Reza Mahmoudabadi
8	OH	(Iran)	Amirhossein Hemmati
9	MB	(Iran)	Amirhossein Rahmani
10	OH	(Iran)	Reza Nematzadeh
11	OP	(Iran)	Mohammad Amiri
13		(Iran)	Mohammadamin Fotouhi
15	L	(Iran)	Naser Rahimipanah (c)
17	OH	(Iran)	Amirmohammad Rafieirad
18	OP	(Iran)	Mojtaba Alizadeh
20	OP	(Iran)	Arya Amraei
23	S	(Iran)	Pouya Ghanbari
25		(Iran)	Parham Ghanbari
55		(Iran)	Amirali Gilani
77	OH	(Iran)	Abolfazl Ahmadi

== Honours ==
- Iranian Volleyball Super League

Runner Up : 1975–76, 1976–77, 1995–96

- First Division League

Winners : 2004

- Volleyball Hazfi cup

Winners : 1976
