= Shahrdari Tabriz VC =

Iranian volleyball team

Shahrdari Tabriz
- Full name: Shahrdari Tabriz
- Founded: 2009; 11 years ago
- Ground: Aghdami Arena, Tabriz
- Chairman: Mir-Masoum Sohrabi
- Manager: Adel Benakar
- League: Iranian Super League
- 2018–19: 10th

Uniforms
Home	Away

Shahrdari Tabriz Volleyball Club (Persian: باشگاه والیبال شهرداری تبریز) is a professional volleyball team based in Tabriz, Iran. They compete in the Iranian Volleyball Super League.

== Current squad ==
- Head Coach: (Iran) Adel Banakar

Number	Player
3	(Iran) Mohammad Hassan Senobar
4	(Iran) Akbar Velaei
5	(Iran) Mehdi Bazargarde
7	(Iran) Armin Asgarpour Khameneh
8	(Iran) Vahid Vali
10	(Iran) Alireza Mobasheri
11	(Germany) Dirk Westphal
12	(Serbia) Milan Rašić
13	(Iran) Alireza Behboudi (c)
17	(Iran) Mohammad Reza Moazzen
	(Iran) Hooman Bagheri
	(Iran) Moein rahimi

== Honors ==
- Iranian Super League

Third place (1): 2018
