= Iranian Volleyball Super League =

Professional volleyball league in Iran

Iranian Volleyball Super League (IVSL)
- Current season, competition or edition: 2025–26 Iranian Volleyball Super League
- Sport: Volleyball
- Founded: 1975 officially 1997 with current format
- No. of teams: 14
- Country: Iran
- Most recent champion: Foolad Sirjan (3nd title)
- Most titles: Paykan Tehran (12 titles)
- Broadcaster: IRIB TV3 IRIB Varzesh IRIB Provincial Channels
- Promotion to: AVC Volleyball Champions League
- Website: Volleyball.ir

The Iranian Volleyball Super League (IVSL) is a professional volleyball league in Iran at the top of the Iranian volleyball league system. It was founded in 1975 as the Pasargad Cup, but after the Iranian Revolution it was renamed to the first Division. In 1997 the league system was revamped, and the Iranian Super League was established.

== History ==
The first season of a national Iranian volleyball league was held in 1975 with 12 teams competing. In 1979 due to the Iranian Revolution the league was canceled.

In 1989, the first Hazfi Cup for Iranian volleyball teams was held. During this period there was no national league and teams competed in the provincial and local leagues instead.

Shortly after the Hazfi Cup, in 1990 the national volleyball league of Iran was restarted by the Iranian Volleyball Federation with 10 teams competing and was called the Fajr Cup. In 2010 the format of the league was changed and 12 teams competed in the league, which was later increased to 14 shortly after and the name was also changed to the Iranian Volleyball Super League or the Iranian Volleyball Premier League.

== Current teams ==
- Paykan Tehran
- Shahrdari Urmia
- Saipa Tehran
- Foolad Sirjan
- Shahdab Yazd
- Sepahan Isfahan
- Mes Rafsanjan
- Pas Gorgan
- Tabiat
- Chadormalu Ardakan
- Mehregan Noor
- Sanatgaran Omid
- Esteghlal Gonbad
- Razin Polymer

== League champions ==
=== Pasargad Cup ===
Season	Champion	Runner-up	Third place
1975–1976	Dokhaniat Tehran	Persepolis Tehran	Taj Tehran
1976–1977	Taj Tehran	Persepolis Tehran	Zob Ahan Isfahan
1977–1978	Taj Tehran	Irana Tehran	Liftraksazi Tabriz
1978–1990	No national league competition only provincial leagues. (because of revolution and war)		

=== First Division ===
Season	Champion	Runner-up	Third place
1990–1991	Bonyad Shahid Tehran	Bank Melli Tehran	Bank Mazandaran Sari
1991–1992	Bonyad Shahid Tehran	Bank Melli Tehran	Bank Tejarat Tehran
1992–1993	Bank Melli Tehran	Bank Tejarat Tehran	Zob Ahan Isfahan
1993–1994	Abgineh Qazvin	Bank Melli Tehran	Bank Tejarat Tehran
1994–1995	Fajr Sepah Tehran	Foolad Khuzestan	Rikhtehgari Tabriz
1995–1996	Fajr Sepah Tehran	Persepolis Tehran	Zob Ahan Isfahan
1996–1997	Paykan Tehran	Zob Ahan Isfahan	Fajr Sepah Tehran

=== Super League ===
Season	Champion	Runner-up	Third place
1997–1998	Paykan Tehran	Zob Ahan Isfahan	Abgineh Qazvin
1998–1999	Paykan Tehran	Sanam Tehran	Zob Ahan Isfahan
1999–2000	Paykan Tehran	Motojen Tabriz	Sanam Tehran
2000–2001	Sanam Tehran	Paykan Tehran	Aboumoslem Khorasan
2001–2002	Sanam Tehran	Paykan Tehran	PAS Tehran
2002–2003	Paykan Tehran	Sanam Tehran	PAS Tehran
2003–2004	Sanam Tehran	Paykan Tehran	Pegah Urmia
2004–2005	Sanam Tehran	Pegah Urmia	Paykan Tehran
2005–2006	Paykan Tehran	Saipa Tehran	Azarpayam Ertebatat Urmia
2006–2007	Paykan Tehran	Gol Gohar Sirjan	Saipa Tehran
2007–2008	Paykan Tehran	Saipa Tehran	Pegah Urmia
2008–2009	Paykan Tehran	Saipa Tehran	Foolad Urmia; BEEM Mazandaran
2009–2010	Paykan Tehran	Saipa Karaj	Kalleh Mazandaran
2010–2011	Paykan Tehran	Saipa Alborz	Kalleh Mazandaran
2011–2012	Kalleh Mazandaran	Saipa Alborz	Paykan Tehran; Shahrdari Urmia
2012–2013	Kalleh Mazandaran	Matin Varamin	Paykan Tehran
2013–2014	Matin Varamin	Kalleh Mazandaran	Shahrdari Urmia
2014–2015	Paykan Tehran	Shahrdari Urmia	Shahrdari Tabriz
2015–2016	Sarmayeh Bank Tehran	Paykan Tehran	Samen Al-Hojaj Khorasan; Shahrdari Urmia
2016–2017	Sarmayeh Bank Tehran	Paykan Tehran	Shahrdari Urmia
2017–2018	Sarmayeh Bank Tehran	Khatam Ardakan	Paykan Tehran; Shahrdari Tabriz
2018–2019	Shahrdari Varamin	Saipa Tehran	Kalleh Mazandaran; Payam Khorasan
2019–2020	The season was canceled due to COVID-19 pandemic.		
2020–2021	Foolad Sirjan	Shahrdari Urmia	Sepahan Isfahan; Labanyat Haraz Amol
2021–2022	Shahdab Yazd	Paykan Tehran	Sepahan Isfahan; Foolad Sirjan
2022–2023	Shahdab Yazd	Labanyat Haraz Amol	PAS Gorgan; Paykan Tehran
2023–2024	Foolad Sirjan	Shahdab Yazd	Paykan Tehran; Shahrdari Urmia
2024–2025	Foolad Sirjan	Shahdab Yazd	Chadormalu Ardakan; Shahrdari Urmia

== Titles by club ==
Team	Winners	Runners-up	Years won	Years runner-up
Paykan Tehran	12	6	1997, 1998, 1999, 2000, 2003, 2006, 2007, 2008, 2009, 2010, 2011, 2015	2001, 2002, 2004, 2016, 2017, 2022
Sanam Tehran	4	2	2001, 2002, 2004, 2005	1999, 2003
Sarmayeh Bank Tehran	3	0	2016, 2017, 2018	–
Kalleh Mazandaran	2	1	2012, 2013	2014
Shahrdari Varamin	2	1	2014, 2019	2013
Shahdab Yazd	2	1	2022, 2023	2024
Esteghlal Tehran	2	0	1977, 1978	–
Bonyad Shahid Tehran	2	0	1991, 1992	–
Fajr Sepah Tehran	2	0	1995, 1996	–
Foolad Sirjan	2	0	2021, 2024	–
Bank Melli Tehran	1	3	1993	1991, 1992, 1994
Dokhaniat Tehran	1	0	1976	–
Abgineh Qazvin	1	0	1994	–
Saipa Tehran	0	7	–	2006, 2008, 2009, 2010, 2011, 2012, 2019
Persepolis Tehran	0	3	–	1976, 1977, 1996
Shahrdari Urmia	0	3	–	2005, 2015, 2021
Zob Ahan Isfahan	0	2	–	1997, 1998
Irana Tehran	0	1	–	1978
Bank Tejarat Tehran	0	1	–	1993
Foolad Khuzestan	0	1	–	1995
Motojen Tabriz	0	1	–	2000
Gol Gohar Sirjan	0	1	–	2007
Khatam Ardakan	0	1	–	2018
Labanyat Haraz Amol	0	1	–	2023

== Titles by city ==
City (Province)	Winners	Runners-up
Tehran (Tehran)	27	20
Amol (Mazandaran)	2	2
Varamin (Tehran)	2	1
Yazd (Yazd)	2	0
Sirjan (Kerman)	2	1
Qazvin (Qazvin)	1	0
Karaj (Alborz)	0	3
Urmia (West Azerbaijan)	0	3
Isfahan (Isfahan)	0	2
Ahvaz (Khuzestan)	0	1
Tabriz (East Azerbaijan)	0	1
Ardakan (Yazd)	0	1

== Notable foreign players ==
- (Argentina) Rodrigo Quiroga
- (Brazil) Rodrigão
- (Bulgaria) Metodi Ananiev
- (Bulgaria) Evgeni Ivanov
- (Bulgaria) Danail Milushev
- (Bulgaria) Smilen Mlyakov
- (Bulgaria) Nikolay Nikolov
- (Cuba) Ángel Dennis
- (Cuba) Yasser Portuondo
- (France) Philippe Barca-Cysique
- (Italy) Valerio Vermiglio
- (Netherlands) Nico Freriks
- (Serbia) Slobodan Kovač
- (Serbia) Vlado Petković
- (Venezuela) Juan Carlos Blanco
- (Poland) Łukasz Żygadło

== See also ==
- AVC Club Championships
- Iranian Women's Volleyball Premier League
