= Shahrdari Urmia VC =

Shahrdari Urmia
- Full name: Shahrdari Urmia Volleyball Club
- Short name: Urmia VC
- Founded: 1996; 24 years ago
- Ground: Ghadir Arena, Urmia
- Manager: Abdolreza Alizadeh
- League: Iranian Super League
- 2023–24: 3nd

Uniforms
Home	Away

Shahrdari Urmia Volleyball Club (Persian: باشگاه والیبال شهرداری ارومیه, Bashgah-e Valibal-e Shiherdari Arumih) is an Iranian professional volleyball team based in Urmia, Iran. They compete in the Iranian Volleyball Super League.

== Sponsorship names ==
- Moghavemat (1996–1999)
- Moghavemat Esteghlal (1999–2000)
- Moghavemat (2000–2001)
- Shahid Bakeri (2001–2002)
- Samansoo (2002–2003)
- Pegah (2003–2008)
- Foolad (2008–2009)
- Heyat Volleyball (2009–2011)
- Shahrdari (2011–present)

== Team rosters ==
(2021–2022)

- (Iran) Alireza Behboudi (capitan)
- (Iran) Saeed Mostafavand
- (Iran) Rahman Davoudi
- (Iran) Saber Kazemi
- (Iran) javid esmaeel zade
- (Iran) Ahad Rezaei
- (Iran) Arman Salehi
- (Iran) Adel Gholami
- (Iran) Ghasem Karkhaneh
- (Iran) Abdolreza Alizadeh
- (Iran) amir reza sarlak
- (Iran) Ashkan Derakhshan
- (Iran) Saeed Aghajani
- (Iran) Amirhossein Hemmati

== Notable former players ==
- (Bulgaria) Krasimir Stefanov
- (Iran) Saeid Marouf
- (Cuba) Yasser Portuondo
- (Iran) Milad Ebadipour
- (Iran) Alireza Nadi
- (Serbia) Slobodan Kovač
- (Italy) Valerio Vermiglio
- (Bulgaria) Nikolay Nikolov

== Honors ==
- Iranian Super League

Runners-up (3): 2005, 2015, 2021
Third place (7): 2004, 2008, 2009, 2012, 2014, 2016, 2017,2023
