= Ali Shafiei =

Iranian volleyball player (born 1991)

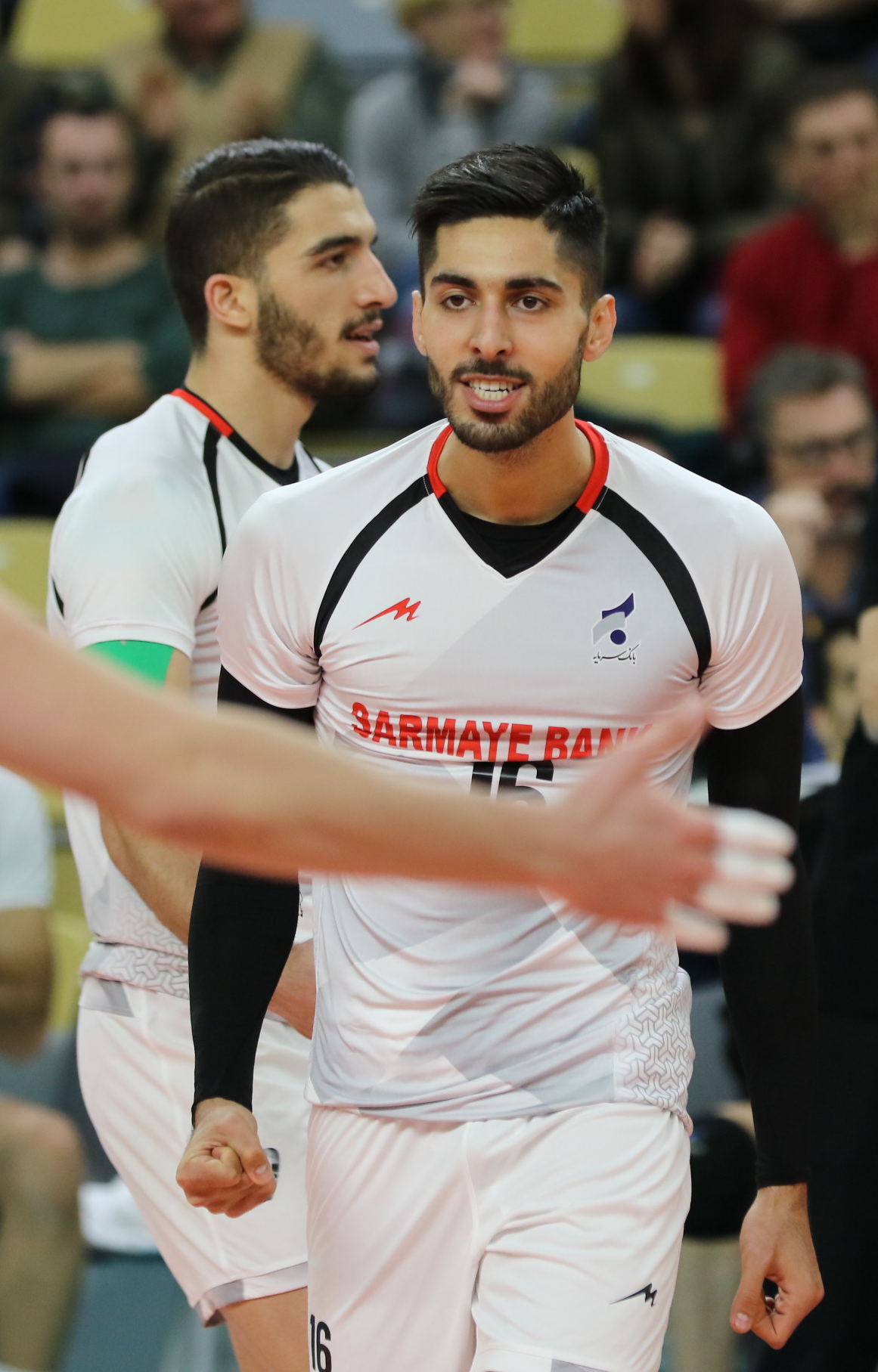

Personal information
- Full name: Ali Shafiei
- Born: September 21, 1991 (age 35); Amol, Iran
- Height: 1.98 m (6 ft 6 in)
- Weight: 90 kg (200 lb)
- Spike: 3.48 m (137 in)
- Block: 3.45 m (136 in)

Volleyball information
- Position: Middle blocker
- Current club: (Iran) Paykan Tehran VC
- Number: 66

Career
Years	Teams
2013 - 2014; 2014 - 2015; 2015 - 2016; 2016 - 2018; 2018 - 2019; 2019; 2019 - 2020; 2020 - 2021; 2021 - 2022; 2022 -	(Iran) Kalleh Mazandaran (Iran) Novin Keshavarz Tehran (Iran) Kalleh Mazandaran (Iran) Sarmayeh Bank Tehran (Iran) Saipa Tehran (France) Stade Poitevin Poitiers (Iran) Shahrdari Urmia (Iran) Saipa Tehran (Iran) Labaniat Haraz Amol (Iran) Paykan Tehran VC

National team
2015 –	Iran
Honours
Representing Iran
Men's volleyball
Asian Championship
Gold medal – first place	2019 Tehran	Team
Silver medal – second place	2015 Tehran	Team
Asian Games
Gold medal – first place	2018 Jakarta–Palembang	Team
Asian Cup
Gold medal – first place	2016 Nakhon Pathom	Team

Ali Shafiei (Persian: علی شفیعی, born September 21, 1991, in Amol) is an Iranian volleyball player who plays as a middle blocker for the Iranian national team and Labaniat Haraz.

He was named Breakout Star Of The 2014/15 Iranian Volleyball Super league. He made his debut for Iran against France in the 2018 Nations League. He has become a fixed member of Iran's national squad since.

== Early life ==
Born in the small northern town Amol, Mazandaran, Shafiei was the first child of phisiotherapst Majid Shafiei and history teacher Shirin Alipour Kashi. Even though Amol was home to the prestigious volleyball club Kalleh, Ali did not show much of interest to the sport while he was growing up.

== Career ==
=== Youth Level and Senior Debut With Kalleh (2010 - 2013) ===
After a nationwide scouting of high school students, Shafiei was chosen as a volleyball talent and was invited to national volleyball camps held by Iran volleyball federation. The camps had a major influence on Shafiei and the idea of becoming a professional volleyball player grew on him. Shafiei went on to sign up for Kalleh Academy and train with them on a regular basis. He went on to be part of the 2012 Kalleh Javan (which is Kalleh's youth team and competes in both Iran's youth division as well as Iran's second tier division) and eventually made his senior debut in the 2012–13 season for the defending champions Kalleh in the Iranian Volleyball Super League (IVSL). During this season he was a regular substitute and was usually swapped with Ali Jadidi in order to strengthen the block on the net. Kalleh finished the season 2nd, losing in a 3-2 thriller to Matin Varamin VC, stopping Kalleh's consecutive championships at number 2.

=== Novin Keshavarz (2014 - 2015) ===
For the 2014/15 season Shafiei joined Novin Keshavarz Tehran to play under coach Massoud Armat . Despite his spell in Kalleh, he was a regular at Novin Keshavarz and showed great premise. In this season for the first time a new format was introduced in which 14 clubs competed in 2 groups of 7, then the top 4 teams of each groups would face in a series of first to two. Novin Keshavarz finished the regular season 3rd of group B below Shahrdari Urmia VC and Matin Varamin VC securing a place at the playoffs where they had to face Mizan Khorasan VC. Shafiei starred alongside Mohammad Mohammad Kazem in a losing effort in a 3–2 away loss in the first match. Novin Keshavarz lost the 2nd game 3–0 at Tehran which brought their campaign to an end. Due to his extraordinary season Shafiei was named Breakout Star Of The 2014/15 IVSL season.

=== Return to Kalleh (2015 - 2016) ===
It was announced, that after one year of absence, Kalleh would return for the 29th edition of the IVSL. Due to budget restrictions, Shafiei joined Ataei's side as one of the few well known players on the roster alongside Nico Ferrerics, Hamzeh Zarini and Reza Ghara. After a very tough season overall, Kalleh finished the regular season 9th. With 13 losses and only 7 wins, and failing to reach the playoffs, this season became Kalleh's poorest campaign run ever.

=== Sarmaye Bank Tehran ===
==== (2016 - 2017) Season ====
For the 2016/17 season Shafiei joined the reigning champions Sarmaye Bank Tehran VC which star studded roster featured players like Milad Ebadipour, Farhad Ghaemi, Łukasz Żygadło, Mehdi Mahdavi, Farhad Zarif. There he alongside Mohammad Mousavi and Adel Gholami formed a middle block trio. Even though Shafiei wore number 6 in both Kalleh and Novin Keshavarz but because number 6 was already taken by Mousavi, Shafiei chose number 16 which from then on became his signature jersey number. Sarmaye Bank finished the season 1st with 20 wins and only 2 losses. Shafiei helped Sarmaye Bank eliminate Shahrdari Tabriz VC (3-2 & 0–3) and Saipa Tehran VC (3-1 & 1–3) to reach the finals against Paykan Tehran VC. He started the game on the bench but was substituted with Gholami and helped Sarmaye Bank make a comeback and win the first match 3–2. Followed by a 3–0 victory in the second game of the series which made their 2016/17 playoff run a perfect 6–0.

After winning his first IVSL championship, Shafiei went on to win his first AVC Club Volleyball Championship in the 2017 edition of the tournament, Defeating Wolf Dogs Nagoya 3–0 in the final game. Shafiei renewed his contract with Sarmaye for 2017/18 season.

==== (2017 - 2018) Season ====
Similar to the previous two seasons, Sarmaye Bank VC kept its "Galactic" status by renewing with the majority of its world-class stars, among whom : Farhad Ghaemi, Shahram Mahmoudi, Łukasz Żygadło and the famous middle block trio Adel Gholami, Mohammad "Seyed" Mousavi and Ali Shafiei. With Milad Ebadipour and Farhad Zarif being the only two major players who left the club and were replaced respectively by Mojtaba Mirzajanpour and Mehdi Marandi. Sarmaye's dominance over the league peaked in this season and the club reached a record 57 points with 19 wins and 3 losses, finishing the regular season with a significant 10 point gap with the second place Saipa VC. In the quarterfinals of the play-off round Sarmaye defeated Havash Gonbad VC with back to back 3-0 results and reached the semifinals against Paykan. A repetition of the last two finals and a modern-day rivalry, Shafiei aided Sarmaye defeat their arch rivals 3-0 and 3–1 to reach the finals for the third straight season. There the team faced playoff wonders Khatam Ardakan VC. The 7th place team during the regular season whom overcame odds by defeating the 2nd place Saipa and 3rd place Shahrdari Tabriz. The underdog put on a fight, however it was not enough and after a 3-2 and a 3-1 victories Sarmaye successfully defended their title for another year with another impressive 6-0 playoffs run. With 3 championships, Sarmaye surpassed Kalleh Mazandaran VC as the 2nd most successful club in the IVSL.

Despite qualifying for the AVC Club Championships, it was announced that Sarmaye Bank would no longer sponsor a team in the IVSL.

Shafiei's efforts during this legendary Sarmaye IVSL run and his performance in the Club World Championships brought much attention to him and once again he was invited to national team.

== Honors ==
=== National team ===
- Asian Championship
  - Gold medal (1) : 2019
  - Silver medal (1) : 2015
- Asian Games
  - Gold medal (1) : 2018
- Asian Cup
  - Gold medal (1) : 2016

=== Club ===
- Iranian Volleyball Super league (IVSL)
  - Champion (2) : 2017 - 2018
  - Runner-up (2) : 2014 - 2019
- Asian Club Volleyball Championships (AVC)
  - Champion (1) : 2017 - 2022
