= Mojtaba Mirzajanpour =

Iranian volleyball player (born 1991)

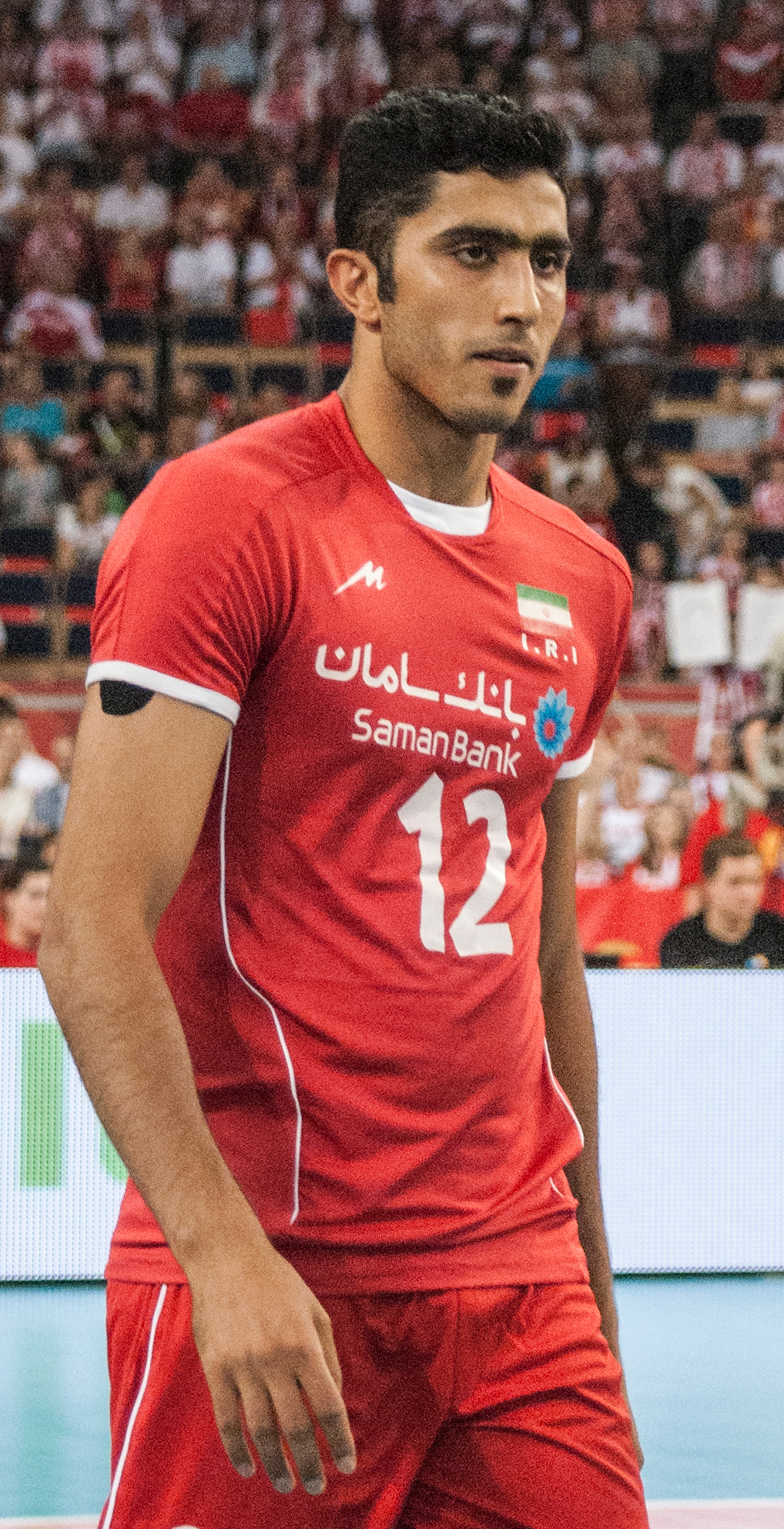
- Mirzajanpour at the 2014 world championship

Personal information
- Full name: Mojtaba Mirzajanpour Muziraji
- Born: October 7, 1991 (age 35); Babol, Mazandaran, Iran
- Height: 2.05 m (6 ft 9 in)
- Weight: 88 kg (194 lb)
- Spike: 355 cm (140 in)
- Block: 348 cm (137 in)

Volleyball information
- Position: Outside Spiker
- Current club: (Iran) Shahrdari Varamin

National team
2013–2018	Iran U19; Iran U21; Iran
Honours
Representing Iran
Men's volleyball
World Grand Champions Cup
Bronze medal – third place	2017 Japan
Asian Games
Gold medal – first place	2014 Incheon

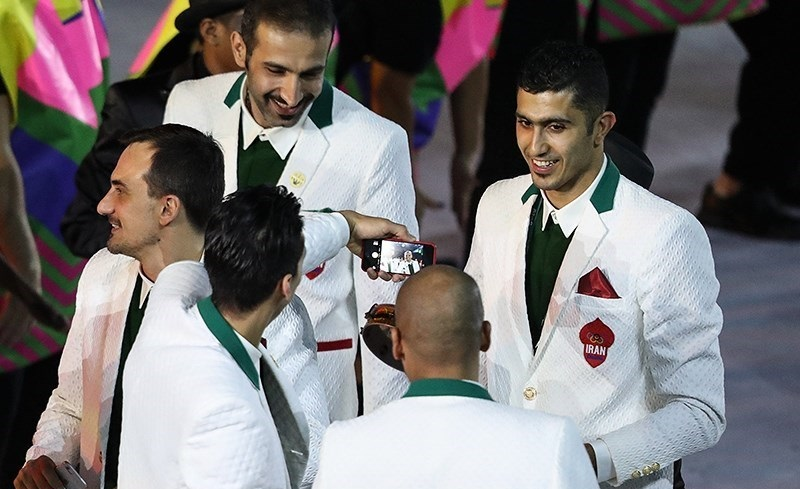
Mirzajanpour (right) in Iran national volleyball team at the 2016 Summer Olympics

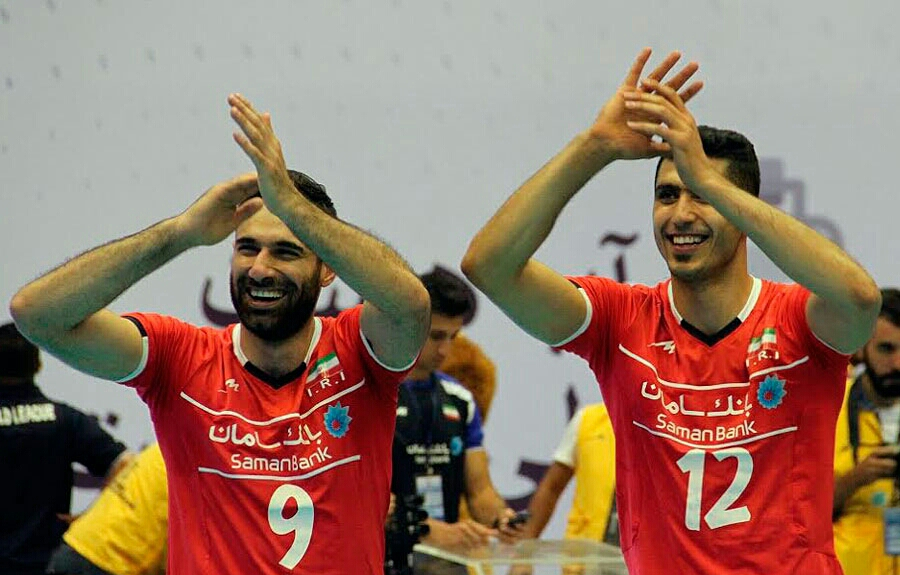
Mojtaba Mirzajanpour (Right) - Adel Gholami (left)

Mojtaba Mirzajanpour Muziraji (Persian: مجتبی میرزاجانپور موزیرجی, born 7 October 1991) is an Iranian volleyball player, a member of the Iran national team and Iranian Volleyball Super League club Shahrdari Varamin. He competed at the 2014 World Championship and Rio 2016 Summer Olympics. Mirzajanpour debut national game in 2013 Grand Championship did with invitations Julio Velasco.

== Career ==
Club	Country	From	To
Shahdari Kahnuj	Iran	2006	2007
Etka Tehran	Iran	2007	2008
Azad University Tehran	Iran	2007	2008
Persepolis	Iran	2008	2010
Paykan Tehran	Iran	2010	2011
Matin Varamin	Iran	2011	2014
Paykan Tehran	Iran	2014	2016
Shahrdari Urmia	Iran	2016	2017
Sarmayeh Bank Tehran	Iran	2017	2018
BCC Castellana Grotte	Italy	2018	2019
Shahrdari Varamin	Iran	2019	

== Personal life ==
He is married to Niloufar Ebrahimi. She is also a volleyball player who plays for Sarmayeh Bank VC.

== Honours ==
=== National team ===
- World Grand Champions Cup
  - Bronze medal (1): 2017
- Asian Games
  - Gold medal (1): 2014
- U19 World Championship
  - Silver medal (1): 2009

=== Club ===
- Asian Championship
  - Gold medal (2): 2014 (Matin), 2017 (Sarmayeh Bank)
- Iranian Super League
  - Champions (4): 2011 (Paykan), 2014 (Matin), 2015 (Paykan), 2018 (Sarmayeh Bank)
