= Łukasz Żygadło =

Polish volleyball player (born 1979)

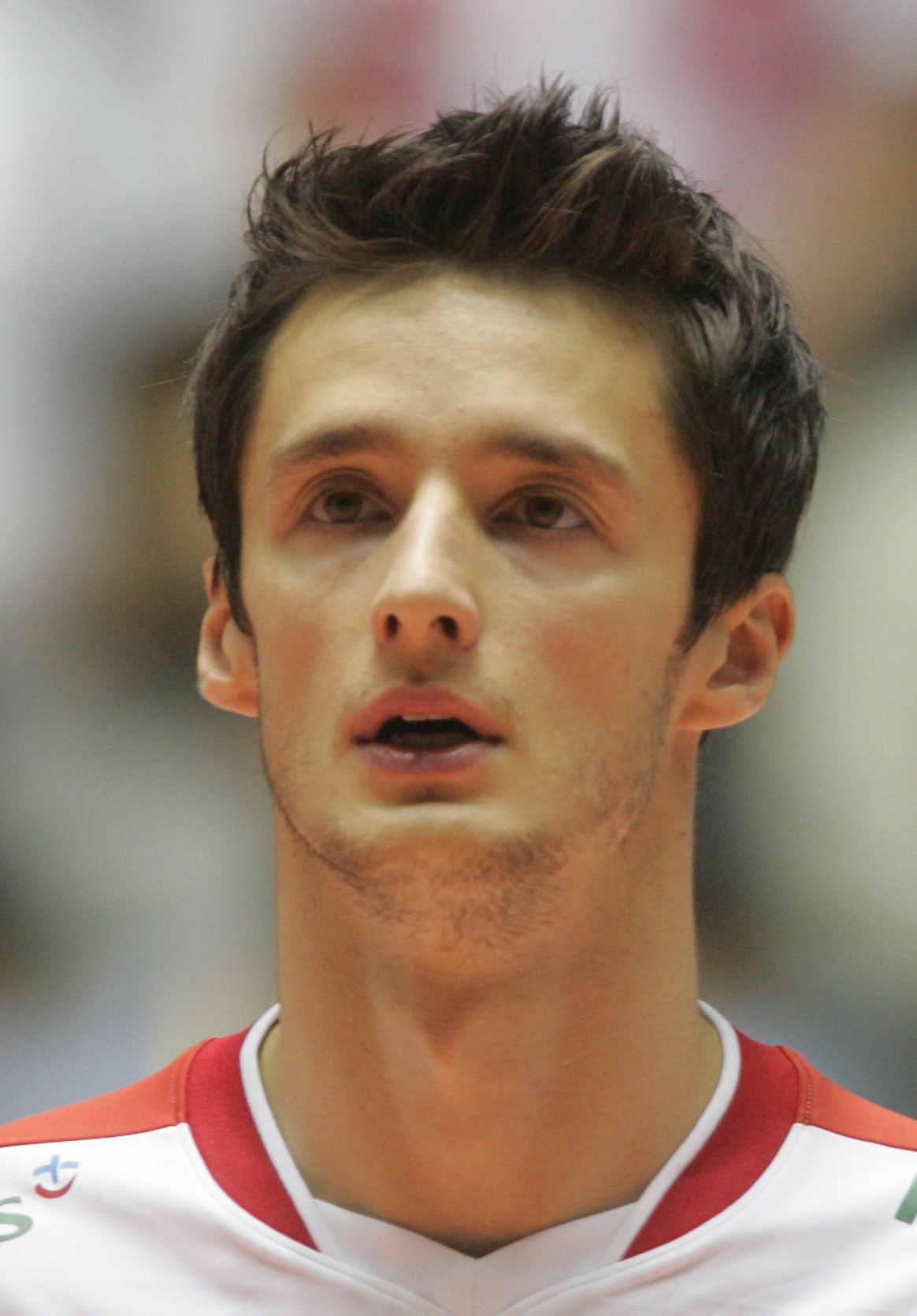

Personal information
- Full name: Łukasz Tomasz Żygadło
- Nickname: Ziomek
- Born: 2 August 1979 (age 47) Sulechów, Poland
- Height: 2.01 m (6 ft 7 in)

Volleyball information
- Position: Setter

Career
- Years: Team
- 1997–2001 2001–2002 2002–2003 2003–2004 2004–2005 2005–2006 2006–2007 2007–2008 2008–2012 2012–2013 2013–2014 2014–2015 2015–2018 2018 2019–2020 2020–2021 2021 2021–2023 2024–2025: AZS Częstochowa; Czarni Radom; Skra Bełchatów; Płomień Sosnowiec; Panathinaikos; Halkbank Ankara; Dynamo Kaliningrad; ZAKSA Kędzierzyn-Koźle; Trentino Volley; Fakel Novy Urengoy; Zenit Kazan; Trentino Volley; Sarmayeh Bank Tehran; Stocznia Szczecin; Al Arabi; Al Wakrah; Al Arabi; Qatar SC; Norwid Częstochowa

National team
- Years: Team
- 1998–2014: Poland (247)
Honours
Men's volleyball
Representing Poland
FIVB World Championship
Silver medal – second place	2006 Japan
FIVB World Cup
Silver medal – second place	2011 Japan
FIVB World League
Gold medal – first place	2012 Sofia
Bronze medal – third place	2011 Gdańsk
CEV European Championship
Bronze medal – third place	2011 Austria/Czech Republic

Łukasz Tomasz Żygadło (born 2 August 1979) is a Polish former professional volleyball player who serves as a chairman of the Polish PlusLiga team, Norwid Częstochowa. Żygadło was a member of the Poland national team from 1998 to 2014 (247 matches in the national team), participant in the 2012 Olympic Games, 2012 World League winner, and a silver medallist at the 2006 World Championship. He is also a multiple Champions League and Club World Championship winner with Trentino Volley.

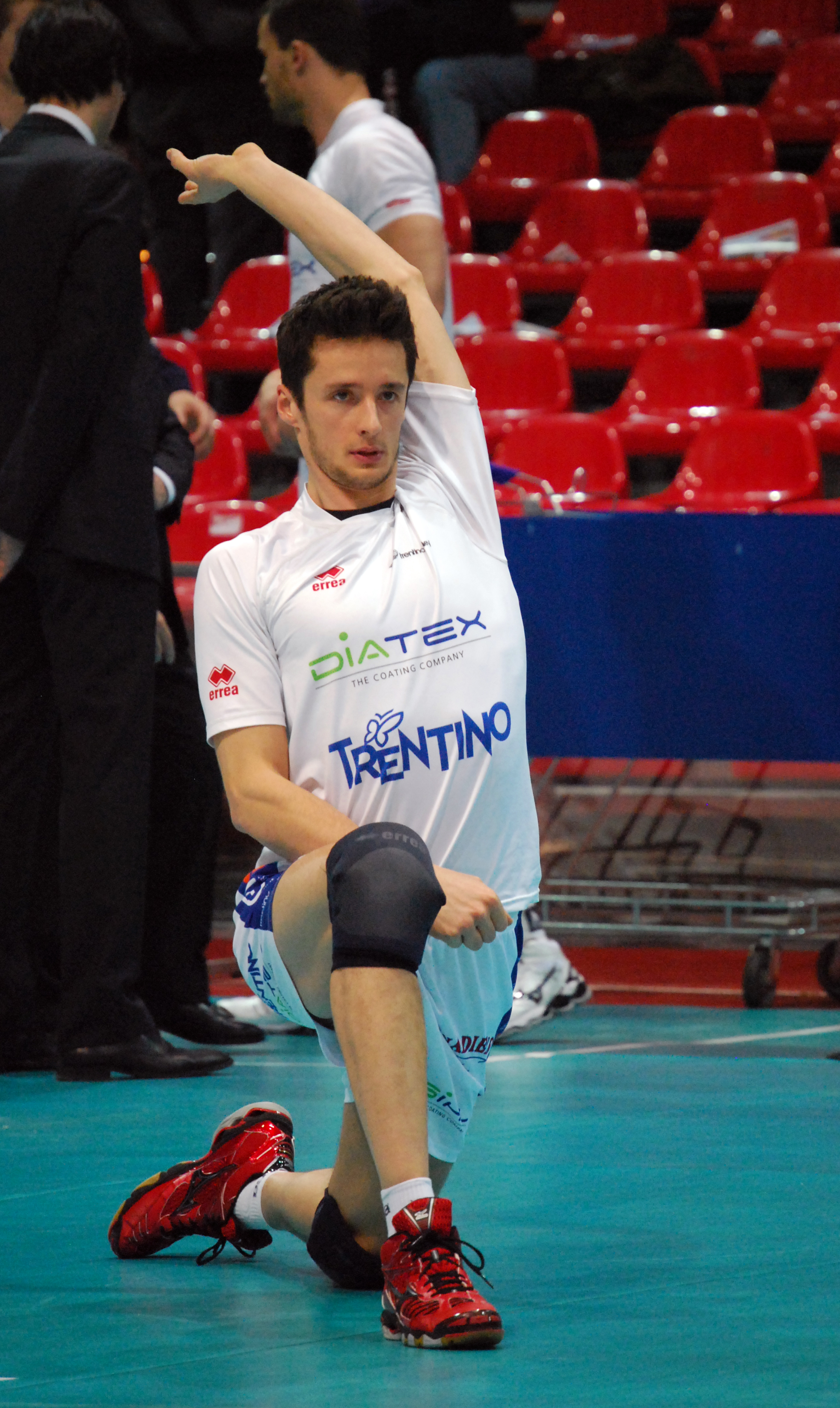
As a player of Itas Diatec Trentino.

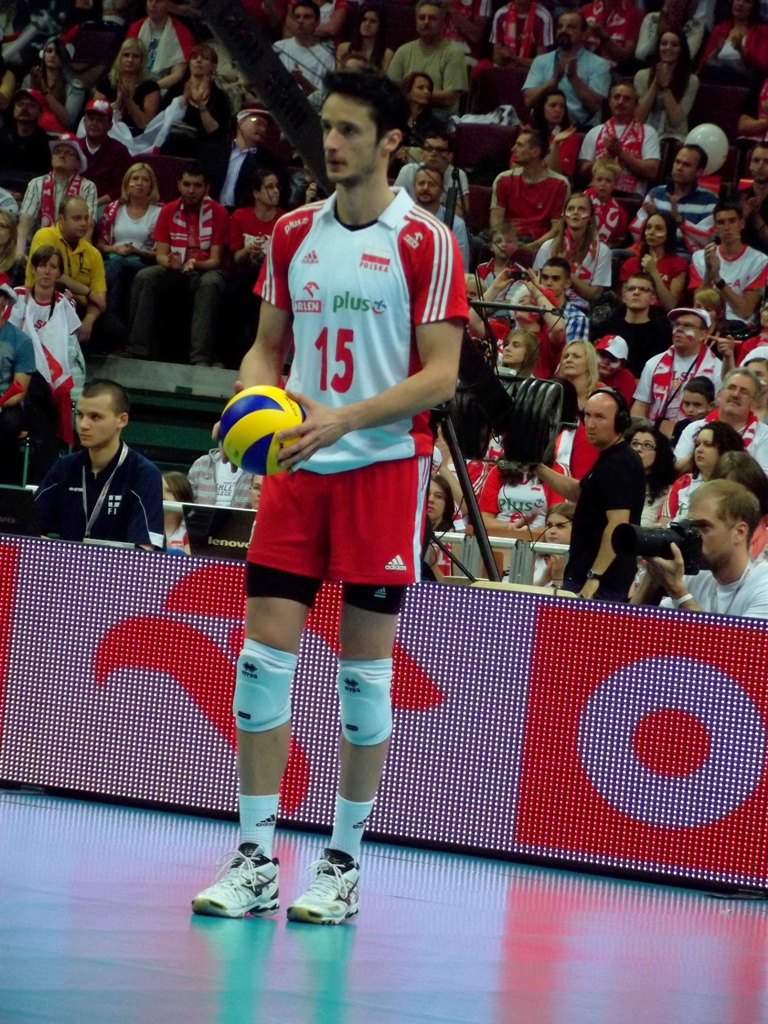
During the match at Spodek in Katowice (2012 World League).

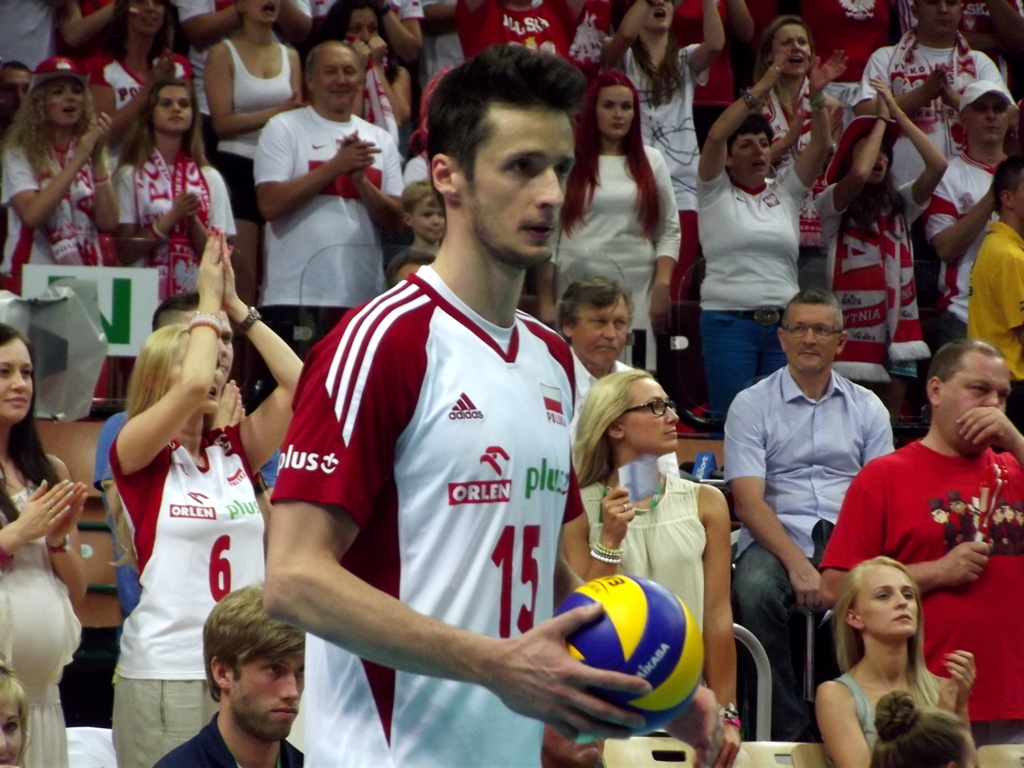
Łukasz Żygadło during the match at Spodek in Katowice (2013 World League).

== Personal life ==
Łukasz Żygadło was born in Sulechów, Poland. He attended School of Sports Championship in Rzeszów. He graduated from Częstochowa University of Technology with a master's degree in Management and Marketing. He is married to Agnieszka. He is an honorary resident of Trentino, Italy. He speaks Polish, Italian, English, Russian. He graduated in 2015 and receive diploma from Associazione Italiana Sommelier. He is a member of AIS in Italy.

== Career ==
=== Club ===
He started his career in club Orion Sulechów. When he was 15, he moved to AZS Częstochowa. After graduation, he continued his career at the club from Częstochowa. Between 1997 and 2001, he won gold, silver and bronze medals in the Polish Championship and Polish Cup of 1998. Then he played for Polish clubs Nordea Czarni Radom and Skra Bełchatów. In the 2003/2004 season, he won the Polish Cup with his club, Polska Energia Sosnowiec. In 2004 he moved to Greece, to play for Panathinaikos. With this club, he won the bronze medal of the Greek Championship. In the next season, 2005/2006, he played for Halkbank Ankara and won the bronze medal of the Turkish Championship. He was awarded the title of best setter of the Turkish League in 2006. In next the two seasons, he played for Polish club, ZAKSA Kędzierzyn-Koźle and Russian club Dinamo Kaliningrad.

In 2008, Żygadło moved to an Italian club, Itas Diatec Trentino, where he played for four seasons. During his time playing in Italy, he won the gold medal at the CEV Champions League three times with his club (2008/2009, 2009/2010, 2010/2011) and the bronze medal in 2012. He was chosen as the best setter of Champions League 2010. He won three gold medals in the FIVB Club World Championship (2009, 2010, 2011). With the club from Trentino, he won three silver (2008/2009, 2009/2010, 2011/2012) and one gold medal of the Italian Championship (2010/2011) and two Italian Cups (2010, 2012).

After four years, Żygadło moved to the Russian League, where he played for Fakel Novy Urengoy for one season, 2012/2013. Then he moved to another Russian club, Zenit Kazan. He signed a 2-year contract and replaced Italian setter Valerio Vermiglio. On October 6, 2013, he was injured during training. He lost season 2013/2014, because of injury. He broke his foot, which is after two surgeries and reconstructions of bone. In the club from Kazan he has been replaced by Serbian setter Nikola Grbić. After two surgeries, bone reconstruction and rehabilitation, Żygadło returned to training in March 2014. After the season 2013/2014 Żygadło left Zenit Kazan. The contract was terminated by mutual agreement of both parties. After two seasons spent in Russia Żygadło accepted an offer from Italian club Trentino Volley. He returned to the club, where he won several titles in 2008–2012. His official return to the club from Trentino was announced on July 10, 2014, and the player stated he was glad about his return to the city and the team. On May 13, 2015, he won title of Italian Champion with Trentino Volley.

In July 2015 he decided to leave the Italian team and signed a contract with newly founded Iranian club Sarmayeh Bank Tehran. On March 14, 2016, Iranian Volleyball Federation decided that Sarmayeh Bank Tehran achieved title of Iranian Champion because their opponent in finale Paykan Tehran was not able to attend in the third and the decisive game of the final series. Żygadło was one of the notable players in Iranian League that season and one of the best in his position. In 2016–2017 season he went on to win second Iranian Championship with his team. On 6 July he won for second time Asian Club Championship which were held in Vietnam, received Best Setter Award of the tournament.

=== National team ===
He debuted in the Polish national team in 2000, when he was appointed to the matches of the World League, European and World Championships. On December 3, 2006, he won with the national team the silver medal of World Championship 2006 in Japan. On July 5, 2010, he gave up his career in the national team, because of the lack of training and lack of competition for his position in the composition.

On March 31, 2011, he returned to the national team after receiving an appointment from coach Andrea Anastasi. In 2011, he won three medals with the Polish national team: silver at World Cup and two bronzes at World League and European Championship. He is a gold medalist of World League 2012 in Sofia, Bulgaria. Despite his injury and lack of play in the 2013/2014 season, Polish coach Antiga appointed Żygadło to the national team in summer 2014.

== Honours ==
=== Club ===
- CEV Champions League
  - 2008–09 – with Trentino Volley
  - 2009–10 – with Trentino Volley
  - 2010–11 – with Trentino Volley
- FIVB Club World Championship
  - 2009 Doha – with Trentino Volley
  - 2010 Doha – with Trentino Volley
  - 2011 Doha – with Trentino Volley
- AVC Asian Club Championship
  - 2016 Naypyidaw – with Sarmayeh Bank Tehran
  - 2017 Vietnam – with Sarmayeh Bank Tehran
- CEV Cup
  - 2014–15 – with Trentino Volley
- Domestic
  - 1997–98 Polish Cup, with AZS Częstochowa
  - 1998–99 Polish Championship, with AZS Częstochowa
  - 2003–04 Polish Cup, with Płomień Sosnowiec
  - 2009–10 Italian Cup, with Trentino Volley
  - 2010–11 Italian Championship, with Trentino Volley
  - 2011–12 Italian Cup, with Trentino Volley
  - 2014–15 Italian Championship, with Trentino Volley
  - 2015–16 Iranian Championship, with Sarmayeh Bank Tehran
  - 2016–17 Iranian Championship, with Sarmayeh Bank Tehran
  - 2017–18 Iranian Championship, with Sarmayeh Bank Tehran

=== Individual awards ===
- 2004: Polish Cup – Best setter
- 2010: CEV Champions League – Best setter
- 2017: AVC Asian Club Championship – Best setter

=== State awards ===
- 2006: Gold Cross of Merit
