= 2013 Asian Men's Volleyball Championship =

International volleyball tournament

Tournament details
- Host country: United Arab Emirates
- City: Dubai
- Dates: 28 September – 6 October
- Teams: 21
- Venues: 2 (in 1 host city)

Final positions
- Champions: Iran (2nd title)
- Runners-up: South Korea
- Third place: China
- Fourth place: Japan

Tournament awards
- MVP: (Iran) Saeid Marouf

The Asian Men's Volleyball Championship was the seventeenth staging of the Asian Men's Volleyball Championship, a biennial international volleyball tournament organised by the Asian Volleyball Confederation (AVC) with United Arab Emirates Volleyball Association (UAEVA). The tournament was held in Doha, United Arab Emirates from 28 September to 6 October 2013.

== Venues ==
Dubai, United Arab Emirates
Hamdan Sports Complex	Al-Maktoum Sports Hall
Capacity: 15,000	Capacity: Unknown

== Pools composition ==
The teams are distributed according to their position in the FIVB World Rankings as of 23 January 2013.

Pool A	Pool B	Pool C	Pool D
United Arab Emirates (Host); ~~Jordan~~ * ~~Indonesia~~ * Uzbekistan	Australia (11); Bahrain; Myanmar	Iran (14); Kuwait; Kazakhstan	China (16); Saudi Arabia; Chinese Taipei
Pool E	Pool F	Pool G	Pool H
Japan (19); Oman; Sri Lanka	South Korea (24); Iraq; Afghanistan	India (30); Qatar; ~~Uzbekistan~~ *	~~Pakistan (41)~~ * Lebanon; Thailand

* Jordan, Indonesia and Pakistan withdrew, Uzbekistan moved to Pool A to balance the number of teams in each pool.

== Preliminary round ==
=== Pool A ===
Pos	Team	Pld	W	L	Pts	SW	SL	SR	SPW	SPL	SPR	Qualification
1	United Arab Emirates	1	1	0	3	3	1	3.000	100	91	1.099	Final sixteen
2	Uzbekistan	1	0	1	0	1	3	0.333	91	100	0.910	Final sixteen

Date	Time		Score		Set 1	Set 2	Set 3	Set 4	Set 5	Total	Report
28 Sep	19:30	United Arab Emirates	3–1	Uzbekistan	25–21	28–26	22–25	25–19		100–91	Report

=== Pool B ===
Pos	Team	Pld	W	L	Pts	SW	SL	SR	SPW	SPL	SPR	Qualification
1	Australia	2	2	0	6	6	1	6.000	180	153	1.176	Final sixteen
2	Bahrain	2	1	1	3	4	4	1.000	185	193	0.959	Final sixteen
3	Myanmar	2	0	2	0	1	6	0.167	153	172	0.890	17th–21st places

Date	Time		Score		Set 1	Set 2	Set 3	Set 4	Set 5	Total	Report
28 Sep	16:00	Bahrain	3–1	Myanmar	25–21	22–25	25–20	25–22		97–88	Report
29 Sep	16:00	Australia	3–1	Bahrain	25–17	25–16	28–30	27–25		105–88	Report
30 Sep	18:30	Myanmar	0–3	Australia	22–25	23–25	20–25			65–75	Report

=== Pool C ===
Pos	Team	Pld	W	L	Pts	SW	SL	SR	SPW	SPL	SPR	Qualification
1	Iran	2	2	0	6	6	0	MAX	150	102	1.471	Final sixteen
2	Kazakhstan	2	1	1	3	3	3	1.000	135	130	1.038	Final sixteen
3	Kuwait	2	0	2	0	0	6	0.000	97	150	0.647	17th–21st places

Date	Time		Score		Set 1	Set 2	Set 3	Set 4	Set 5	Total	Report
28 Sep	14:00	Iran	3–0	Kazakhstan	25–21	25–17	25–22			75–60	Report
29 Sep	14:00	Kuwait	0–3	Iran	13–25	12–25	17–25			42–75	Report
30 Sep	12:00	Kazakhstan	3–0	Kuwait	25–23	25–15	25–17			75–55	Report

=== Pool D ===
Pos	Team	Pld	W	L	Pts	SW	SL	SR	SPW	SPL	SPR	Qualification
1	China	2	2	0	6	6	0	MAX	158	136	1.162	Final sixteen
2	Chinese Taipei	2	1	1	3	3	3	1.000	145	143	1.014	Final sixteen
3	Saudi Arabia	2	0	2	0	0	6	0.000	129	153	0.843	17th–21st places

Date	Time		Score		Set 1	Set 2	Set 3	Set 4	Set 5	Total	Report
28 Sep	16:00	Saudi Arabia	0–3	Chinese Taipei	20–25	21–25	22–25			63–75	Report
29 Sep	18:30	China	3–0	Saudi Arabia	28–26	25–18	25–22			78–66	Report
30 Sep	16:00	Chinese Taipei	0–3	China	24–26	19–25	27–29			70–80	Report

=== Pool E ===
Pos	Team	Pld	W	L	Pts	SW	SL	SR	SPW	SPL	SPR	Qualification
1	Japan	2	2	0	6	6	0	MAX	150	96	1.563	Final sixteen
2	Sri Lanka	2	1	1	3	3	3	1.000	128	130	0.985	Final sixteen
3	Oman	2	0	2	0	0	6	0.000	98	150	0.653	17th–21st places

Date	Time		Score		Set 1	Set 2	Set 3	Set 4	Set 5	Total	Report
28 Sep	14:00	Oman	0–3	Sri Lanka	21–25	15–25	19–25			55–75	Report
29 Sep	18:30	Japan	3–0	Oman	25–12	25–17	25–14			75–43	Report
30 Sep	16:00	Sri Lanka	0–3	Japan	16–25	23–25	14–25			53–75	Report

=== Pool F ===
Pos	Team	Pld	W	L	Pts	SW	SL	SR	SPW	SPL	SPR	Qualification
1	South Korea	2	2	0	6	6	0	MAX	150	102	1.471	Final sixteen
2	Iraq	2	1	1	3	3	3	1.000	131	124	1.056	Final sixteen
3	Afghanistan	2	0	2	0	0	6	0.000	95	150	0.633	17th–21st places

Date	Time		Score		Set 1	Set 2	Set 3	Set 4	Set 5	Total	Report
28 Sep	19:30	Iraq	3–0	Afghanistan	25–17	25–15	25–17			75–49	Report
29 Sep	16:00	South Korea	3–0	Iraq	25–19	25–18	25–19			75–56	Report
30 Sep	18:30	Afghanistan	0–3	South Korea	13–25	19–25	14–25			46–75	Report

=== Pool G ===
Pos	Team	Pld	W	L	Pts	SW	SL	SR	SPW	SPL	SPR	Qualification
1	Qatar	1	1	0	2	3	2	1.500	105	107	0.981	Final sixteen
2	India	1	0	1	1	2	3	0.667	107	105	1.019	Final sixteen

Date	Time		Score		Set 1	Set 2	Set 3	Set 4	Set 5	Total	Report
29 Sep	12:00	Qatar	3–2	India	17–25	25–21	23–25	25–23	15–13	105–107	Report

=== Pool H ===
Pos	Team	Pld	W	L	Pts	SW	SL	SR	SPW	SPL	SPR	Qualification
1	Thailand	1	1	0	3	3	1	3.000	102	95	1.074	Final sixteen
2	Lebanon	1	0	1	0	1	3	0.333	95	102	0.931	Final sixteen

Date	Time		Score		Set 1	Set 2	Set 3	Set 4	Set 5	Total	Report
30 Sep	14:00	Lebanon	1–3	Thailand	25–22	19–25	23–25	28–30		95–102	Report

== Classification 17th–21st ==
17th–21st places
1 October – Dubai
Bye
Afghanistan
1 October – Dubai
Myanmar
Bye
2 October – Dubai
Kuwait
Bye
2 October – Dubai
Saudi Arabia	1
Oman	3

17th–20th places
4 October – Dubai
Afghanistan	0
Myanmar	3
4 October – Dubai
Kuwait	3
Oman	2

17th place
5 October – Dubai
Myanmar	0
Kuwait	3
19th place
5 October – Dubai
Afghanistan	1
Oman	3

=== Quarterfinals ===
Date	Time		Score		Set 1	Set 2	Set 3	Set 4	Set 5	Total	Report
02 Oct	10:00	Saudi Arabia	1–3	Oman	22–25	25–13	18–25	19–25		84–88	Report

=== Semifinals ===
Date	Time		Score		Set 1	Set 2	Set 3	Set 4	Set 5	Total	Report
04 Oct	10:00	Afghanistan	0–3	Myanmar	16–25	16–25	23–25			55–75	Report
04 Oct	10:00	Kuwait	3–2	Oman	25–19	25–23	24–26	21–25	15–10	110–103	Report

=== 19th place ===
Date	Time		Score		Set 1	Set 2	Set 3	Set 4	Set 5	Total	Report
05 Oct	10:00	Afghanistan	1–3	Oman	25–18	23–25	17–25	17–25		82–93	Report

=== 17th place ===
Date	Time		Score		Set 1	Set 2	Set 3	Set 4	Set 5	Total	Report
05 Oct	10:00	Myanmar	0–3	Kuwait	23–25	23–25	20–25			66–75	Report

== Classification round ==
- The results and the points of the matches between the same teams that were already played during the preliminary round shall be taken into account for the classification round.

=== Pool I ===
Pos	Team	Pld	W	L	Pts	SW	SL	SR	SPW	SPL	SPR	Qualification
1	Thailand	3	3	0	9	9	1	9.000	252	211	1.194	Quarterfinals
2	Lebanon	3	2	1	6	7	3	2.333	248	210	1.181	Quarterfinals
3	United Arab Emirates	3	1	2	3	3	7	0.429	218	244	0.893	9th–16th places
4	Uzbekistan	3	0	3	0	1	9	0.111	197	250	0.788	9th–16th places

Date	Time		Score		Set 1	Set 2	Set 3	Set 4	Set 5	Total	Report
01 Oct	12:00	Thailand	3–0	Uzbekistan	25–15	25–19	25–21			75–55	Report
01 Oct	18:30	United Arab Emirates	0–3	Lebanon	15–25	16–25	26–28			57–78	Report
02 Oct	16:00	Uzbekistan	0–3	Lebanon	14–25	19–25	18–25			51–75	Report
02 Oct	18:30	United Arab Emirates	0–3	Thailand	19–25	22–25	20–25			61–75	Report

=== Pool J ===
Pos	Team	Pld	W	L	Pts	SW	SL	SR	SPW	SPL	SPR	Qualification
1	Australia	3	2	1	7	8	4	2.000	289	250	1.156	Quarterfinals
2	India	3	2	1	6	8	6	1.333	321	309	1.039	Quarterfinals
3	Bahrain	3	1	2	3	5	6	0.833	261	277	0.942	9th–16th places
4	Qatar	3	1	2	2	3	8	0.375	225	260	0.865	9th–16th places

Date	Time		Score		Set 1	Set 2	Set 3	Set 4	Set 5	Total	Report
01 Oct	14:00	Australia	2–3	India	23–25	24–26	25–23	25–23	12–15	109–112	Report
01 Oct	16:00	Qatar	0–3	Bahrain	22–25	26–28	22–25			70–78	Report
02 Oct	12:00	Bahrain	1–3	India	20–25	23–25	26–24	26–28		95–102	Report
02 Oct	14:00	Australia	3–0	Qatar	25–21	25–13	25–16			75–50	Report

=== Pool K ===
Pos	Team	Pld	W	L	Pts	SW	SL	SR	SPW	SPL	SPR	Qualification
1	Iran	3	3	0	9	9	1	9.000	247	196	1.260	Quarterfinals
2	South Korea	3	2	1	6	7	3	2.333	237	223	1.063	Quarterfinals
3	Kazakhstan	3	1	2	3	3	7	0.429	229	248	0.923	9th–16th places
4	Iraq	3	0	3	0	1	9	0.111	203	249	0.815	9th–16th places

Date	Time		Score		Set 1	Set 2	Set 3	Set 4	Set 5	Total	Report
01 Oct	12:00	Iran	3–0	Iraq	25–16	25–17	25–20			75–53	Report
01 Oct	14:00	South Korea	3–0	Kazakhstan	29–27	25–20	25–23			79–70	Report
02 Oct	12:00	Kazakhstan	3–1	Iraq	25–22	22–25	25–22	27–25		99–94	Report
02 Oct	14:00	Iran	3–1	South Korea	25–19	25–16	22–25	25–23		97–83	Report

=== Pool L ===
Pos	Team	Pld	W	L	Pts	SW	SL	SR	SPW	SPL	SPR	Qualification
1	China	3	3	0	9	9	1	9.000	248	210	1.181	Quarterfinals
2	Japan	3	2	1	6	7	3	2.333	241	204	1.181	Quarterfinals
3	Chinese Taipei	3	1	2	3	3	6	0.500	203	209	0.971	9th–16th places
4	Sri Lanka	3	0	3	0	0	9	0.000	156	225	0.693	9th–16th places

Date	Time		Score		Set 1	Set 2	Set 3	Set 4	Set 5	Total	Report
01 Oct	16:00	China	3–0	Sri Lanka	25–14	25–17	25–18			75–49	Report
01 Oct	18:30	Japan	3–0	Chinese Taipei	25–18	25–20	25–20			75–58	Report
02 Oct	16:00	China	3–1	Japan	18–25	25–22	25–22	25–22		93–91	Report
02 Oct	18:30	Chinese Taipei	3–0	Sri Lanka	25–18	25–17	25–19			75–54	Report

== Classification 9th–16th ==
9th–16th places
4 October – Dubai
United Arab Emirates	0
Qatar	3
4 October – Dubai
Kazakhstan	3
Sri Lanka	0
4 October – Dubai
Bahrain	3
Uzbekistan	0
4 October – Dubai
Chinese Taipei	3
Iraq	0

9th–12th places
5 October – Dubai
Qatar	1
Kazakhstan	3
5 October – Dubai
Bahrain	2
Chinese Taipei	3

9th place
6 October – Dubai
Kazakhstan	1
Chinese Taipei	3
11th place
6 October – Dubai
Qatar	3
Bahrain	2

13th–15th places
5 October – Dubai
United Arab Emirates	3
Sri Lanka	2
5 October – Dubai
Uzbekistan	2
Iraq	3

13th place
6 October – Dubai
United Arab Emirates	1
Iraq	3
15th place
6 October – Dubai
Sri Lanka	3
Uzbekistan	0

=== Quarterfinals ===
Date	Time		Score		Set 1	Set 2	Set 3	Set 4	Set 5	Total	Report
04 Oct	12:00	Kazakhstan	3–0	Sri Lanka	25–21	25–20	25–22			75–63	Report
04 Oct	14:00	Bahrain	3–0	Uzbekistan	25–15	25–18	25–23			75–56	Report
04 Oct	16:00	Chinese Taipei	3–0	Iraq	25–10	25–19	25–23			75–52	Report
04 Oct	18:30	United Arab Emirates	0–3	Qatar	22–25	21–25	14–25			57–75	Report

=== 13th–16th semifinals ===
Date	Time		Score		Set 1	Set 2	Set 3	Set 4	Set 5	Total	Report
05 Oct	12:00	Uzbekistan	2–3	Iraq	21–25	20–25	25–17	25–21	10–15	101–103	Report
05 Oct	18:30	United Arab Emirates	3–2	Sri Lanka	26–24	13–25	20–25	29–27	15–12	103–113	Report

=== 9th–12th semifinals ===
Date	Time		Score		Set 1	Set 2	Set 3	Set 4	Set 5	Total	Report
05 Oct	14:00	Qatar	1–3	Kazakhstan	25–19	17–25	24–26	22–25		88–95	Report
05 Oct	16:00	Bahrain	2–3	Chinese Taipei	20–25	25–22	25–23	23–25	13–15	106–110	Report

=== 15th place ===
Date	Time		Score		Set 1	Set 2	Set 3	Set 4	Set 5	Total	Report
06 Oct	09:00	Sri Lanka	3–0	Uzbekistan	25–19	25–17	25–20			75–56	Report

=== 13th place ===
Date	Time		Score		Set 1	Set 2	Set 3	Set 4	Set 5	Total	Report
06 Oct	15:00	United Arab Emirates	1–3	Iraq	19–25	25–15	23–25	22–25		89–90	Report

=== 11th place ===
Date	Time		Score		Set 1	Set 2	Set 3	Set 4	Set 5	Total	Report
06 Oct	11:00	Qatar	3–2	Bahrain	19–25	25–27	25–23	25–23	15–12	109–110	Report

=== 9th place ===
Date	Time		Score		Set 1	Set 2	Set 3	Set 4	Set 5	Total	Report
06 Oct	13:00	Kazakhstan	1–3	Chinese Taipei	23–25	21–25	25–17	16–25		85–92	Report

== Final round ==
Quarterfinals
4 October – Dubai
Thailand	0
Japan	3
4 October – Dubai
Iran	3
Lebanon	0
4 October – Dubai
Australia	0
South Korea	3
4 October – Dubai
China	3
India	1

Semifinals
5 October – Dubai
Japan	0
Iran	3
5 October – Dubai
South Korea	3
China	2

Final
6 October – Dubai
Iran	3
South Korea	0
3rd place
6 October – Dubai
Japan	1
China	3

5th–8th places
5 October – Dubai
Thailand	3
Lebanon	1
5 October – Dubai
Australia	3
India	1

5th place
6 October – Dubai
Thailand	1
Australia	3
7th place
6 October – Dubai
Lebanon	2
India	3

=== Quarterfinals ===
Date	Time		Score		Set 1	Set 2	Set 3	Set 4	Set 5	Total	Report
04 Oct	12:00	Thailand	0–3	Japan	24–26	21–25	16–25			61–76	Report
04 Oct	14:00	Iran	3–0	Lebanon	25–19	25–18	25–17			75–54	Report
04 Oct	16:00	China	3–1	India	22–25	25–22	25–21	25–18		97–86	Report
04 Oct	18:30	Australia	0–3	South Korea	14–25	17–25	16–25			47–75	Report

=== 5th–8th semifinals ===
Date	Time		Score		Set 1	Set 2	Set 3	Set 4	Set 5	Total	Report
05 Oct	12:00	Thailand	3–1	Lebanon	16–25	25–21	25–23	28–26		94–95	Report
05 Oct	14:00	Australia	3–1	India	25–20	25–18	21–25	25–12		96–75	Report

=== Semifinals ===
Date	Time		Score		Set 1	Set 2	Set 3	Set 4	Set 5	Total	Report
05 Oct	16:00	Japan	0–3	Iran	19–25	16–25	22–25			57–75	Report
05 Oct	18:30	South Korea	3–2	China	25–23	23–25	25–23	20–25	15–12	108–108	Report

=== 7th place ===
Date	Time		Score		Set 1	Set 2	Set 3	Set 4	Set 5	Total	Report
06 Oct	12:00	Lebanon	2–3	India	25–27	25–23	23–25	25–21	15–17	113–113	Report

=== 5th place ===
Date	Time		Score		Set 1	Set 2	Set 3	Set 4	Set 5	Total	Report
06 Oct	14:00	Thailand	1–3	Australia	28–26	14–25	18–25	24–26		84–102	Report

=== 3rd place ===
Date	Time		Score		Set 1	Set 2	Set 3	Set 4	Set 5	Total	Report
06 Oct	16:00	Japan	1–3	China	18–25	22–25	25–22	20–25		85–97	Report

=== Final ===
Date	Time		Score		Set 1	Set 2	Set 3	Set 4	Set 5	Total	Report
06 Oct	18:30	Iran	3–0	South Korea	25–19	25–22	25–19			75–60	Report

== Final standing ==
Rank	Team
1st place, gold medalist(s)	Iran
2nd place, silver medalist(s)	South Korea
3rd place, bronze medalist(s)	China
4	Japan
5	Australia
6	Thailand
7	India
8	Lebanon
9	Chinese Taipei
10	Kazakhstan
11	Qatar
12	Bahrain
13	Iraq
14	United Arab Emirates
15	Sri Lanka
16	Uzbekistan
17	Kuwait
18	Myanmar
19	Oman
20	Afghanistan
21	Saudi Arabia

Qualified for the 2013 World Grand Champions Cup
Already qualified as hosts for the 2013 World Grand Champions Cup

2013 Asian Men's champions

Iran
2nd title

Team Roster
Shahram Mahmoudi, Saeid Marouf, Farhad Ghaemi, Mohammad Mousavi, Hamzeh Zarini, Farhad Zarif, Adel Gholami, Amir Ghafour, Rahman Davoudi, Mehdi Mahdavi, Armin Tashakkori, Alireza Mobasheri
Head Coach: Julio Velasco

== Awards ==
- MVP: (Iran) Saeid Marouf
- Best Scorer: (China) Zhong Weijun
- Best Spiker: (Iran) Amir Ghafour
- Best Blocker: (Iran) Mohammad Mousavi
- Best Server: (China) Zhong Weijun
- Best Setter: (Iran) Saeid Marouf
- Best Libero: (Iran) Farhad Zarif
