= 2016 Asian Men's Club Volleyball Championship =

Tournament held in Naypyidaw, Myanmar

2016 Asian Men's Club Championship
Tournament details
- Host country: Myanmar
- Dates: 23–31 August
- Teams: 14
- Venues: 2 (in 1 host city)

Final positions
- Champions: (Iran) Sarmayeh Bank Tehran (1st title)

Tournament awards
- MVP: (Iran) Shahram Mahmoudi (SAR)

The 2016 Asian Men's Club Volleyball Championship was the 17th staging of the AVC Club Championships. The tournament was held in Naypyidaw, Myanmar from 23 to 31 August 2016. The champions qualified for the 2017 Club World Championship as Asia's representative.

== Pools composition ==
Teams were seeded in the first two positions of each pool following the Serpentine system according to their final standing of the 2015 edition. AVC reserved the right to seed the hosts as head of pool A regardless of the final standing of the 2015 edition. All teams not seeded were drawn. But, Turkmenistan later withdrew. Final standing of the 2015 edition are shown in brackets except the hosts who did not participate in the 2015 edition.

Pool A	Pool B	Pool C	Pool D
Myanmar (Hosts)	Chinese Taipei (1)	Qatar (2)	Iran (3)
~~Turkmenistan (8)~~	Iraq (7)	China (5)	Kazakhstan (4)
Vietnam (11)	Japan (10)	Thailand (9)	Malaysia (–)
	Indonesia (–)	United Arab Emirates (–)	Hong Kong (–)

== Venues ==
- Wunna Theikdi Sports Complex – Hall B, Naypyidaw, Myanmar – Preliminary round, Pool E, F and Final eight
- Wunna Theikdi Sports Complex – Hall C, Naypyidaw, Myanmar – Preliminary round, Pool H, 9th–12th places and 13th–14th places

== Pool standing procedure ==
1. Number of matches won
2. Match points
3. Sets ratio
4. Points ratio
5. Result of the last match between the tied teams

Match won 3–0 or 3–1: 3 match points for the winner, 0 match points for the loser
Match won 3–2: 2 match points for the winner, 1 match point for the loser

== Preliminary round ==
- All times are Myanmar Standard Time (UTC+06:30).

=== Pool A ===
Pos	Team	Pld	W	L	Pts	SW	SL	SR	SPW	SPL	SPR	Qualification
1	(Myanmar) Asia World	1	1	0	3	3	0	MAX	75	58	1.293	Pool E
2	(Vietnam) Maseco TP.HCM	1	0	1	0	0	3	0.000	58	75	0.773	Pool E

Date	Time		Score		Set 1	Set 2	Set 3	Set 4	Set 5	Total	Report
23 Aug	11:30	Maseco TP.HCM (Vietnam)	0–3	(Myanmar) Asia World	17–25	20–25	21–25			58–75	P2

=== Pool B ===
Pos	Team	Pld	W	L	Pts	SW	SL	SR	SPW	SPL	SPR	Qualification
1	(Chinese Taipei) Taiwan Power Company	3	3	0	8	9	3	3.000	282	240	1.175	Pool F
2	(Japan) Toyoda Gosei Trefuerza	3	2	1	6	8	5	1.600	298	270	1.104	Pool F
3	(Indonesia) Polri Samator	3	1	2	3	4	7	0.571	233	260	0.896	Pool H
4	(Iraq) Gas Al-Janoob	3	0	3	1	3	9	0.333	241	284	0.849	Pool H

Date	Time		Score		Set 1	Set 2	Set 3	Set 4	Set 5	Total	Report
23 Aug	11:30	Polri Samator (Indonesia)	1–3	(Chinese Taipei) Taiwan Power Company	11–25	25–23	15–25	21–25		72–98	P2
23 Aug	14:00	Toyoda Gosei Trefuerza (Japan)	3–2	(Iraq) Gas Al-Janoob	25–14	23–25	25–13	27–29	15–13	115–94	P2
24 Aug	11:30	Taiwan Power Company (Chinese Taipei)	3–0	(Iraq) Gas Al-Janoob	25–18	25–22	25–22			75–62	P2
24 Aug	11:40	Polri Samator (Indonesia)	0–3	(Japan) Toyoda Gosei Trefuerza	25–27	23–25	19–25			67–77	P2
25 Aug	11:40	Toyoda Gosei Trefuerza (Japan)	2–3	(Chinese Taipei) Taiwan Power Company	22–25	23–25	25–23	25–21	11–15	106–109	P2
25 Aug	14:00	Gas Al-Janoob (Iraq)	1–3	(Indonesia) Polri Samator	23–25	20–25	25–19	17–25		85–94	P2

=== Pool C ===
Pos	Team	Pld	W	L	Pts	SW	SL	SR	SPW	SPL	SPR	Qualification
1	(Qatar) Al Arabi	3	3	0	9	9	1	9.000	244	163	1.497	Pool E
2	(China) Shanghai Golden Age	3	2	1	6	7	3	2.333	231	198	1.167	Pool E
3	(Thailand) Wing 46 Phitsanulok	3	1	2	3	3	6	0.500	159	204	0.779	9th–12th semifinals
4	(United Arab Emirates) Al Jazira	3	0	3	0	0	9	0.000	156	225	0.693	9th–12th semifinals

Date	Time		Score		Set 1	Set 2	Set 3	Set 4	Set 5	Total	Report
23 Aug	14:10	Al Arabi (Qatar)	3–0	(Thailand) Wing 46 Phitsanulok	25–10	25–10	25–12			75–32	P2
23 Aug	16:40	Al Jazira (United Arab Emirates)	0–3	(China) Shanghai Golden Age	17–25	19–25	16–25			52–75	P2
24 Aug	14:10	Shanghai Golden Age (China)	3–0	(Thailand) Wing 46 Phitsanulok	25–20	25–14	25–18			75–52	P2
24 Aug	16:40	Al Jazira (United Arab Emirates)	0–3	(Qatar) Al Arabi	17–25	18–25	15–25			50–75	P2
25 Aug	14:30	Wing 46 Phitsanulok (Thailand)	3–0	(United Arab Emirates) Al Jazira	25–19	25–22	25–13			75–54	P2
25 Aug	16:40	Al Arabi (Qatar)	3–1	(China) Shanghai Golden Age	19–25	25–21	25–14	25–21		94–81	P2

=== Pool D ===
Pos	Team	Pld	W	L	Pts	SW	SL	SR	SPW	SPL	SPR	Qualification
1	(Iran) Sarmayeh Bank Tehran	3	3	0	9	9	1	9.000	245	171	1.433	Pool F
2	(Kazakhstan) Altay	3	2	1	6	7	3	2.333	235	173	1.358	Pool F
3	Malaysia	3	1	2	3	3	7	0.429	181	224	0.808	Pool H
4	Hong Kong	3	0	3	0	1	9	0.111	151	244	0.619	Pool H

Date	Time		Score		Set 1	Set 2	Set 3	Set 4	Set 5	Total	Report
23 Aug	17:05	Malaysia	3–1	Hong Kong	25–15	19–25	25–17	25–17		94–74	P2
23 Aug	18:30	Sarmayeh Bank Tehran (Iran)	3–1	(Kazakhstan) Altay	25–18	20–25	25–20	25–22		95–85	P2
24 Aug	16:30	Hong Kong	0–3	(Kazakhstan) Altay	15–25	12–25	14–25			41–75	P2
24 Aug	18:40	Malaysia	0–3	(Iran) Sarmayeh Bank Tehran	22–25	18–25	10–25			50–75	P2
25 Aug	16:30	Sarmayeh Bank Tehran (Iran)	3–0	Hong Kong	25–6	25–19	25–11			75–36	P2
25 Aug	19:05	Altay (Kazakhstan)	3–0	Malaysia	25–12	25–12	25–13			75–37	P2

== Classification round ==
- All times are Myanmar Standard Time (UTC+06:30).
- The results and the points of the matches between the same teams that were already played during the preliminary round shall be taken into account for the classification round.

=== Pool E ===
Pos	Team	Pld	W	L	Pts	SW	SL	SR	SPW	SPL	SPR	Qualification
1	(Qatar) Al Arabi	6	3	3	9	9	10	0.900	244	199	1.226	Quarterfinals
2	(China) Shanghai Golden Age	3	2	1	6	7	4	1.750	254	233	1.090	Quarterfinals
3	(Myanmar) Asia World	3	1	2	3	4	6	0.667	214	231	0.926	Quarterfinals
4	(Vietnam) Maseco TP.HCM	3	0	3	0	0	9	0.000	176	225	0.782	Quarterfinals

Date	Time		Score		Set 1	Set 2	Set 3	Set 4	Set 5	Total	Report
27 Aug	14:10	Asia World (Myanmar)	1–3	(China) Shanghai Golden Age	19–25	24–26	25–22	14–25		82–98	P2
27 Aug	19:10	Al Arabi (Qatar)	3–0	(Vietnam) Maseco TP.HCM	25–22	25–20	25–19			75–61	P2
28 Aug	14:10	Asia World (Myanmar)	0–3	(Qatar) Al Arabi	17–25	19–25	21–25			57–75	P2
28 Aug	19:10	Maseco TP.HCM (Vietnam)	0–3	(China) Shanghai Golden Age	20–25	18–25	19–25			57–75	P2

=== Pool F ===
Pos	Team	Pld	W	L	Pts	SW	SL	SR	SPW	SPL	SPR	Qualification
1	(Iran) Sarmayeh Bank Tehran	3	3	0	9	9	2	4.500	272	232	1.172	Quarterfinals
2	(Japan) Toyoda Gosei Trefuerza	3	1	2	4	6	6	1.000	263	268	0.981	Quarterfinals
3	(Kazakhstan) Altay	3	1	2	3	4	6	0.667	218	226	0.965	Quarterfinals
4	(Chinese Taipei) Taiwan Power Company	3	1	2	2	3	8	0.375	230	257	0.895	Quarterfinals

Date	Time		Score		Set 1	Set 2	Set 3	Set 4	Set 5	Total	Report
27 Aug	11:30	Taiwan Power Company (Chinese Taipei)	0–3	(Kazakhstan) Altay	21–25	17–25	18–25			56–75	P2
27 Aug	16:40	Sarmayeh Bank Tehran (Iran)	3–1	(Japan) Toyoda Gosei Trefuerza	28–26	25–18	23–25	25–13		101–82	P2
28 Aug	11:30	Toyoda Gosei Trefuerza (Japan)	3–0	(Kazakhstan) Altay	25–20	25–18	25–20			75–58	P2
28 Aug	16:40	Taiwan Power Company (Chinese Taipei)	0–3	(Iran) Sarmayeh Bank Tehran	21–25	24–26	20–25			65–76	P2

=== Pool H ===
Pos	Team	Pld	W	L	Pts	SW	SL	SR	SPW	SPL	SPR	Qualification
1	(Indonesia) Polri Samator	3	3	0	9	9	2	4.500	274	220	1.245	9th–12th semifinals
2	(Iraq) Gas Al-Janoob	3	2	1	6	7	4	1.750	266	237	1.122	9th–12th semifinals
3	Malaysia	3	1	2	3	5	7	0.714	272	285	0.954	13th place match
4	Hong Kong	3	0	3	0	1	9	0.111	174	244	0.713	13th place match

Date	Time		Score		Set 1	Set 2	Set 3	Set 4	Set 5	Total	Report
27 Aug	14:00	Polri Samator (Indonesia)	3–0	Hong Kong	25–14	25–20	25–13			75–47	P2
27 Aug	16:30	Malaysia	1–3	(Iraq) Gas Al-Janoob	32–30	18–25	16–25	24–26		90–106	P2
28 Aug	14:00	Gas Al-Janoob (Iraq)	3–0	Hong Kong	25–21	25–18	25–14			75–53	P2
28 Aug	16:30	Polri Samator (Indonesia)	3–1	Malaysia	25–23	25–17	30–32	25–16		105–88	P2

== Final round ==
- All times are Myanmar Standard Time (UTC+06:30).

=== 13th–14th places ===
==== 13th place match ====
Date	Time		Score		Set 1	Set 2	Set 3	Set 4	Set 5	Total	Report
30 Aug	14:00	Malaysia	3–0	Hong Kong	25–18	25–21	25–18			75–57	P2

=== 9th–12th places ===
- After the August 2016 Myanmar earthquake, (United Arab Emirates) Al Jazira decided to give up the 9th–12th places.

9th–12th semifinals
29 August
(Thailand) Phitsanulok	1
(Iraq) Gas Al-Janoob	3
(Indonesia) Polri Samator	Bye
(United Arab Emirates) Al Jazira

9th place match
30 August
(Iraq) Gas Al-Janoob	2
(Indonesia) Polri Samator	3
11th place match
(Thailand) Phitsanulok	Bye
(United Arab Emirates) Al Jazira

==== 9th–12th semifinals ====
Date	Time		Score		Set 1	Set 2	Set 3	Set 4	Set 5	Total	Report
29 Aug	14:00	Wing 46 Phitsanulok (Thailand)	1–3	(Iraq) Gas Al-Janoob	26–24	23–25	27–29	15–25		91–103	P2

==== 9th place match ====
Date	Time		Score		Set 1	Set 2	Set 3	Set 4	Set 5	Total	Report
30 Aug	16:30	Gas Al-Janoob (Iraq)	2–3	(Indonesia) Polri Samator	19–25	20–25	25–12	25–18	12–15	101–95	P2

=== Final eight ===
Quarterfinals
29 August
(Iran) Sarmayeh Bank	3
(Vietnam) Maseco TP.HCM	0
29 August
(China) Shanghai	3
(Kazakhstan) Altay	1
29 August
(Qatar) Al Arabi	3
(Chinese Taipei) Taiwan Power	1
29 August
(Japan) Toyoda Gosei	3
(Myanmar) Asia World	0

Semifinals
30 August
(Iran) Sarmayeh Bank	3
(China) Shanghai	0
30 August
(Qatar) Al Arabi	3
(Japan) Toyoda Gosei	2

Final
31 August
(Iran) Sarmayeh Bank	3
(Qatar) Al Arabi	1
3rd place match
31 August
(China) Shanghai	2
(Japan) Toyoda Gosei	3

5th–8th semifinals
30 August
(Vietnam) Maseco TP.HCM	2
(Kazakhstan) Altay	3
30 August
(Chinese Taipei) Taiwan Power	3
(Myanmar) Asia World	0

5th place match
31 August
(Kazakhstan) Altay	3
(Chinese Taipei) Taiwan Power	1
7th place match
31 August
(Vietnam) Maseco TP.HCM	3
(Myanmar) Asia World	1

==== Quarterfinals ====
Date	Time		Score		Set 1	Set 2	Set 3	Set 4	Set 5	Total	Report
29 Aug	11:40	Sarmayeh Bank Tehran (Iran)	3–0	(Vietnam) Maseco TP.HCM	25–18	25–16	25–18			75–52	P2
29 Aug	14:10	Toyoda Gosei Trefuerza (Japan)	3–0	(Myanmar) Asia World	25–12	25–19	25–17			75–48	P2
29 Aug	16:40	Shanghai Golden Age (China)	3–1	(Kazakhstan) Altay	29–27	23–25	36–34	25–23		113–109	P2
29 Aug	19:35	Al Arabi (Qatar)	3–1	(Chinese Taipei) Taiwan Power Company	25–18	19–25	25–12	25–18		94–73	P2

==== 5th–8th semifinals ====
Date	Time		Score		Set 1	Set 2	Set 3	Set 4	Set 5	Total	Report
30 Aug	11:30	Maseco TP.HCM (Vietnam)	2–3	(Kazakhstan) Altay	33–31	21–25	21–25	25–21	14–16	114–118	P2
30 Aug	14:30	Taiwan Power Company (Chinese Taipei)	3–0	(Myanmar) Asia World	25–21	30–28	25–21			80–70	P2

==== Semifinals ====
Date	Time		Score		Set 1	Set 2	Set 3	Set 4	Set 5	Total	Report
30 Aug	16:40	Sarmayeh Bank Tehran (Iran)	3–0	(China) Shanghai Golden Age	28–26	25–16	25–21			78–63	P2
30 Aug	19:10	Al Arabi (Qatar)	3–2	(Japan) Toyoda Gosei Trefuerza	25–19	19–25	23–25	28–26	15–9	110–104	P2

==== 7th place match ====
Date	Time		Score		Set 1	Set 2	Set 3	Set 4	Set 5	Total	Report
31 Aug	14:10	Maseco TP.HCM (Vietnam)	3–1	(Myanmar) Asia World	25–22	29–27	17–25	26–24		97–98	P2

==== 5th place match ====
Date	Time		Score		Set 1	Set 2	Set 3	Set 4	Set 5	Total	Report
31 Aug	11:30	Altay (Kazakhstan)	3–1	(Chinese Taipei) Taiwan Power Company	25–22	21–25	25–21	25–20		96–88	P2

==== 3rd place match ====
Date	Time		Score		Set 1	Set 2	Set 3	Set 4	Set 5	Total	Report
31 Aug	16:40	Shanghai Golden Age (China)	2–3	(Japan) Toyoda Gosei Trefuerza	21–25	25–23	19–25	25–17	13–15	103–105	P2

==== Final ====
Date	Time		Score		Set 1	Set 2	Set 3	Set 4	Set 5	Total	Report
31 Aug	19:30	Sarmayeh Bank Tehran (Iran)	3–1	(Qatar) Al Arabi	24–26	25–18	25–16	25–19		99–79	P2

== Final standing ==
Rank	Team
1st place, gold medalist(s)	(Iran) Sarmayeh Bank Tehran
2nd place, silver medalist(s)	(Qatar) Al Arabi
3rd place, bronze medalist(s)	(Japan) Toyoda Gosei Trefuerza
4	(China) Shanghai Golden Age
5	(Kazakhstan) Altay
6	(Chinese Taipei) Taiwan Power Company
7	(Vietnam) Maseco TP.HCM
8	(Myanmar) Asia World
9	(Indonesia) Polri Samator
10	(Iraq) Gas Al-Janoob
11	(Thailand) Wing 46 Phitsanulok
12	(United Arab Emirates) Al Jazira
13	Malaysia
14	Hong Kong

Qualified for the 2017 Club World Championship

2016 Asian Men's Club Champions

1st title

12–man Roster
Mahmoudi, Ebadipour, Ćaćić, Ghaemi, Mousavi, G. Karkhaneh, Zarif, Gholami, Mahdavi (c), Shafiei, Żygadło, Jalali
Head coach
M. Karkhaneh

== Awards ==
- Most Valuable Player
  (Iran) Shahram Mahmoudi (Sarmayeh Bank Tehran)
- Best Setter
  (Iran) Mehdi Mahdavi (Sarmayeh Bank Tehran)
- Best Outside Spikers
  (Serbia) Uroš Kovačević (Al Arabi)
  (Iran) Milad Ebadipour (Sarmayeh Bank Tehran)
- Best Middle Blockers
  (Brazil) Leandro Vissotto (Al Arabi)
  (Iran) Mohammad Mousavi (Sarmayeh Bank Tehran)
- Best Opposite Spiker
  (Germany) György Grozer (Shanghai Golden Age)
- Best Libero
  (Japan) Koichiro Koga (Toyoda Gosei Trefuerza)
