= Shahram Mahmoudi =

Iranian volleyball player

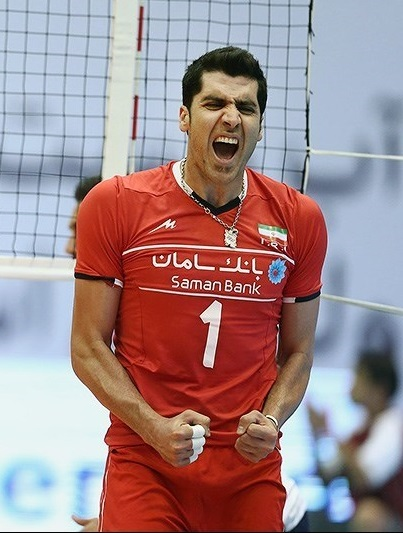
- Mahmoudi in 2015

Personal information
- Full name: Shahram Mahmoudi Khatounabadi
- Born: July 20, 1988 (age 38); Mianeh, East Azerbaijan, Iran
- Height: 1.98 m (6 ft 6 in)
- Weight: 95 kg (209 lb)
- Spike: 347 cm (137 in)
- Block: 332 cm (131 in)

Volleyball information
- Position: Opposite spiker
- Current club: None

Career
| Years | Teams |
|---|---|
| 2006–2007 | (Iran) Aidaneh Chaldoran |
| 2007–2009 | (Iran) Paykan Tehran |
| 2009–2010 | (Iran) Petrochimi Bandar Imam |
| 2010–2011 | (Iran) Aluminium Hormozgan |
| 2011–2013 | (Iran) Kalleh Mazandaran |
| 2013–2014 | (Iran) Matin Varamin |
| 2014–2015 | (Iran) Shahrdari Urmia |
| 2015–2018 | (Iran) Sarmayeh Bank Tehran |
| 2018–2019 | (Iran) Khatam Ardakan |
| 2019–2020 | (Iran) Shahrdari Urmia |

National team
| 2013–2019 | Iran |
Honours
Representing Iran
Men's volleyball
Asian Championship
| Gold medal – first place | 2013 Dubai | Team |
Asian Games
| Gold medal – first place | 2014 Incheon | Team |

Shahram Mahmoudi Khatounabadi (Persian: شهرام محمودی, born 20 July 1988 in Mianeh) is an Iranian volleyball player who plays for the Iran men's national volleyball team. He competed at the Rio 2016 Summer Olympics. Mahmoudi debuted national games in 2013 Grand Championship with invitations from Julio Velasco. He is the younger brother of volleyball player Behnam Mahmoudi. He and his brother are originally from Mianeh, East Azerbaijan. Mahmoudi has been, three times, named Most Valuable Player in Asian Club Championship.

== Awards ==
=== Individuals ===
- 2012 Asian Club Championship "Best Spiker"
- 2014 Asian Club Championship "Most Valuable Player"
- 2016 Asian Club Championship "Most Valuable Player"
- 2017 Asian Club Championship "Most Valuable Player"

=== National team ===
- 2007 FIVB U21 World Championship - Bronze Medal
- 2013 Asian Championship - Gold Medal
- 2014 Asian Games - Gold Medal

=== Clubs ===
- 2008 Iranian Super League - Champion, with Paykan
- 2008 Asian Club Championship - Champion, with Paykan
- 2009 Asian Club Championship - Champion, with Paykan
- 2009 Iranian Super League - Champion, with Paykan
- 2012 Iranian Super League - Champion, with Kalleh
- 2012 Asian Club Championship – Bronze medal, with Kalleh
- 2013 Iranian Super League - Champion, with Kalleh
- 2013 Asian Club Championship - Champion, with Kalleh
- 2014 Iranian Super League - Champion, with Matin
- 2014 Asian Club Championship - Champion, with Matin
- 2016 Iranian Super League - Champion, with Sarmayeh Bank
- 2016 Asian Club Championship - Champion, with Sarmayeh Bank
- 2017 Iranian Super League - Champion, with Sarmayeh Bank
- 2017 Asian Club Championship - Champion, with Sarmayeh Bank
- 2018 Iranian Super League - Champion, with Sarmayeh Bank
- 2018 Asian Club Championship - Champion, with Khatam Ardakan
