= Ghasem Karkhaneh =

Iranian volleyball player (born 1994)

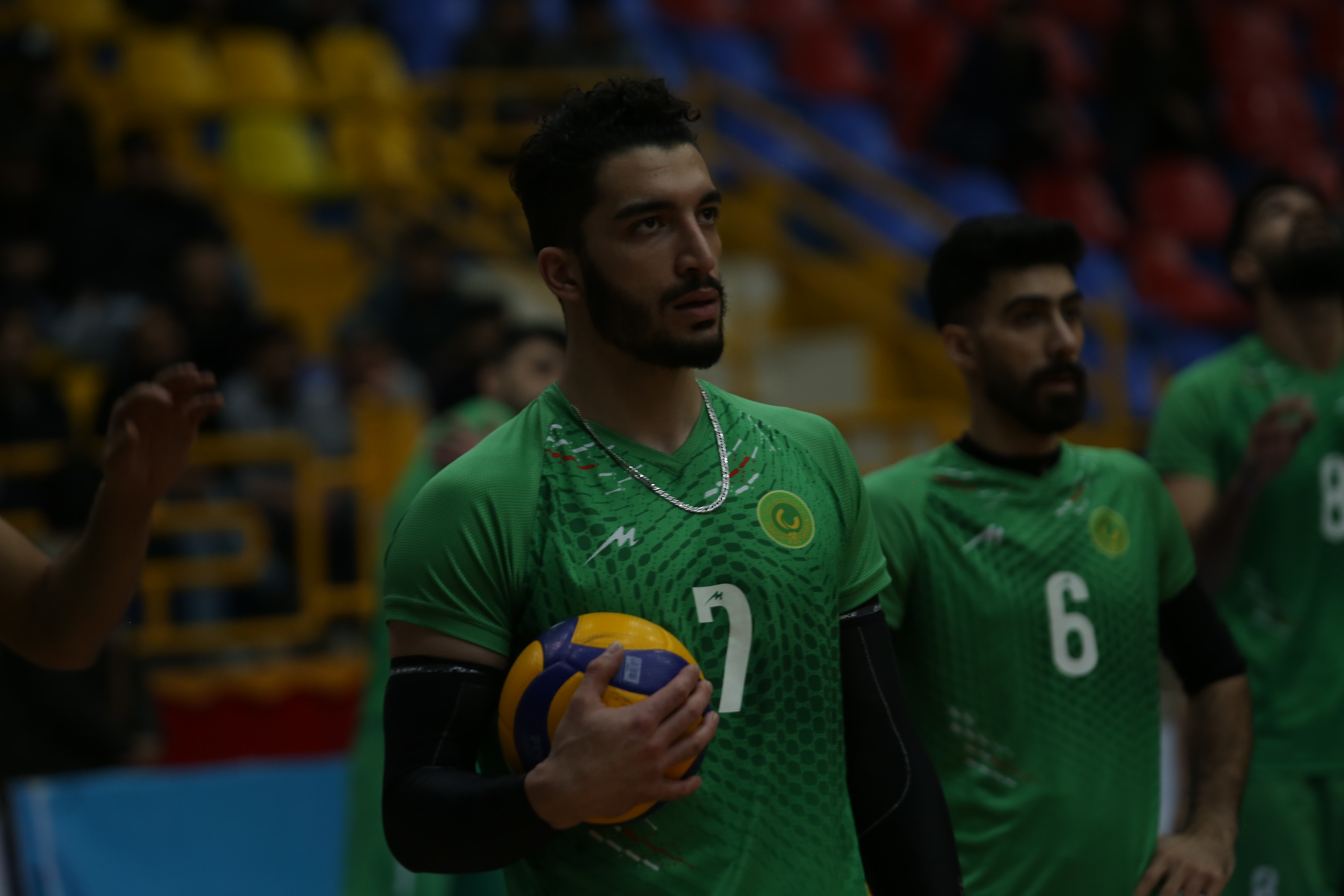

Personal information
- Full name: Ghasem Karkhaneh
- Born: August 22, 1994 (age 32); Varamin, Iran
- Height: 1.97 m (6 ft 6 in)
- Weight: 95 kg (209 lb)
- Spike: 3.38 m (133 in)
- Block: 3.35 m (132 in)

Volleyball information
- Position: Outside hitter
- Current club: (Iran) Pas Gorgan
- Number: 7

Career
Years	Teams
2010; 2011; 2012; 2013; 2014; 2015-2017; 2018-2019; 2020; 2021-2022; 2023	(Iran) Persepolis (Iran) Giti Pasand Isfahan (Iran) Shahrdari Varamin (Iran) Barij Essence Kashan (Iran) Mizan Khorasan (Iran) Sarmayeh Bank (Iran) Khatam Ardakan (Iran) Saipa Tehran (Iran) Shahrdari Urmia (Iran) Pas Gorgan

National team
2017	(Iran) students' volleyball
Honours
Representing Iran
Men's volleyball
World Games
Gold medal – first place	students' volleyball	Team

Ghasem Karkhaneh (Persian: قاسم کارخانه, born August 22, 1994, in Varamin) is an Iranian volleyball player who plays as an Outside hitter for the Iranian club Pas Gorgan.

Karkhaneh has a history of playing in Sarmayeh Bank, Shahrdari Urmia and Iranian students' volleyball.

Also, Ghasem Karkhaneh is the son of Mostafa Karkhaneh

== Honours ==
=== Iranian students' National team ===
- 2017 Iranian students' volleyball
  - (gold) Gold (1): 2017
