= Sarmayeh Bank Tehran VC =

Iranian volleyball club

Sarmayeh Bank
- Full name: Sarmayeh Bank Tehran
- Short name: Sarmayeh
- Nickname: Sarmayeh Daran (Capitalists)
- Founded: 2015
- Dissolved: March 2018
- Ground: House Of Volleyball; Tehran (Capacity: 1,500)
- Owner: Sarmayeh Bank
- Manager: (Iran) Mostafa Karkhaneh
- Captain: (Iran) Mehdi Mahdavi
- League: Iranian Super League
- 2017–18: 1st
- Website: Club home page

Uniforms
Home	Away

Sarmayeh Bank Volleyball Club (Persian: باشگاه والیبال بانک سرمایه, Bâshgâh-e Vâlibâl-e Bânk-e Sarmâye) was an Iranian professional volleyball team based in Tehran, Iran.

== History ==
In 2015 Sarmayeh Bank Volleyball Club was established in Tehran, Iran. Sarmayeh started its appearance in Iranian Volleyball Super League by hiring famous players from Iranian national team. They achieved the champion title in the first year of presence in Iranian Premiere League.

Invincible Sarmayeh Bank underlined their supremacy over the 2016 Asian Men’s Club Championship in Myanmar following their 3-1 victory over Qatar’s Al-Arabi in the final showdown and sweeping Toyoda Gosei Trefuerza 3-0 in the 2017 Asian Men’s Club Championship final in Vietnam.

The team was dissolved in March 2018 after the third consecutive championship in the Iranian Volleyball Super League.

== Men's team ==
Team roster - season 2016/2017
No.	Name	Date of birth	Position
1	(Iran) Shahram Mahmoudi	July 20, 1988 (age 38)	Opposite spiker
2	(Iran) Milad Ebadipour	October 17, 1993 (age 32)	Outside Spiker
4	(Montenegro) Vojin Ćaćić	March 31, 1990 (age 36)	Outside Spiker
5	(Iran) Farhad Ghaemi	August 28, 1989 (age 36)	Outside Spiker
6	(Iran) Seyed Mohammad Mousavi	August 22, 1987 (age 38)	Middle blocker
7	(Iran) Ghasem Karkhaneh	August 21, 1994 (age 31)	Outside Spiker
8	(Iran) Farhad Zarif	March 3, 1983 (age 43)	Libero
9	(Iran) Adel Gholami	February 9, 1986 (age 40)	Middle blocker
13 (c)	(Iran) Mehdi Mahdavi	February 13, 1984 (age 42)	Setter
14	(Iran) Ali Shafiei	September 21, 1991 (age 34)	Middle blocker
15	(Poland) Łukasz Żygadło	August 2, 1979 (age 47)	Setter
16	(Iran) Alireza Jalali	April 16, 1985 (age 41)	Opposite spiker
Head coach: (Iran) Mostafa Karkhaneh; Assistant: (Iran) Javad Mehregan; Trainer: Mohammadreza Tondravan; Scoutman: Ramin Tajedini; Doctor: Siyamak Afroozi; Masseur: Alireza Pishyareh

Team roster - season 2015/2016
No.	Name	Date of birth	Position
1	(Iran) Shahram Mahmoudi	July 20, 1988 (age 38)	Opposite spiker
2	(Iran) Hossein Hasanpour		Middle blocker
3	(Cuba) Yosleyder Cala	October 22, 1984 (age 41)	Outside Spiker
4	(Iran) Mohammadreza Soleimani		Opposite spiker
5	(Iran) Mohammad Fallah	March 3, 1993 (age 33)	Middle blocker
6	(Iran) Seyed Mohammad Mousavi	August 22, 1987 (age 38)	Middle blocker
7	(Iran) Ghasem Karkhaneh	August 21, 1994 (age 31)	Outside Spiker
8	(Iran) Farhad Zarif	March 3, 1983 (age 43)	Libero
9	(Iran) Adel Gholami	February 9, 1986 (age 40)	Middle blocker
10	(Iran) Alireza Mobasheri	June 10, 1988 (age 38)	Outside Spiker
12	(Iran) Farhad Nazari Afshar	May 22, 1984 (age 42)	Outside Spiker
13 (c)	(Iran) Mehdi Mahdavi	February 13, 1984 (age 42)	Setter
15	(Poland) Łukasz Żygadło	August 2, 1979 (age 47)	Setter
16	(Iran) Mir Babak Mousavi	April 8, 1997 (age 29)	Outside Spiker
18	(Iran) Faramarz Zarif	February 5, 1993 (age 33)	Libero
Head coach: (Iran) Mostafa Karkhaneh; Assistant: (Iran) Abbas Barghi; Trainer: Mohammadreza Tondravan; Scoutman: Mehrdad Mehranpour; Doctor: Siyamak Afroozi; Masseur: Alireza Pishyareh

== Women's team ==
Team roster - 2016 Asian Club Championship
No.	Name	Position
2	(Iran) Negin Shirtari Foumani	Setter
4	(Iran) Soudabeh Bagherpour	Middle blocker
6	(Iran) Shabnam Alikhani	Setter
7 (c)	(Iran) Zeinab Giveh	Outside hitter
8	(Iran) Mahsa Saberi	Outside hitter
9	(Iran) Neda Chamlanian	Opposite spiker
10	(Iran) Maedeh Borhani Esfahani	Opposite spiker
11	(Iran) Mahsa Kadkhoda	Outside hitter
12	(Iran) Farzaneh Zarei	Outside hitter
13	(Iran) Negar Kiani	Libero
16	(Iran) Farnoosh Sheikhi	Middle blocker
17	(Iran) Shekoufeh Safari	Middle blocker
Head Coach: (Slovenia) Majda Čičić

== Honors ==
- Iranian Super League

Winners (3): 2016, 2017, 2018

- Asian Club Championship

Winners (2): 2016, 2017

- Club World Championship

Seventh place (1): 2017
