= Farhad Ghaemi =

Iranian volleyball player (born 1989)

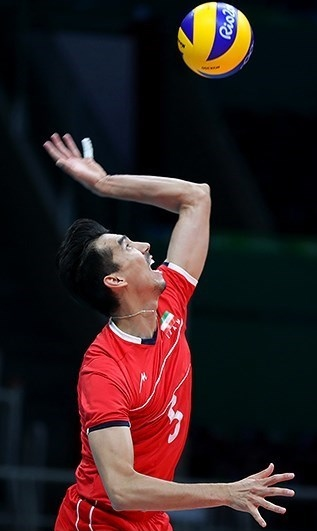
- Ghaemi at the 2016 Olympics

Personal information
- Full name: Farhad Ghaemi
- Born: August 28, 1989 (age 37); Gonbad-e Kavus, Iran
- Height: 1.97 m (6 ft 6 in)
- Weight: 73 kg (161 lb)
- Spike: 3.55 cm (1 in)
- Block: 3.15 cm (1 in)

Volleyball information
- Position: Outside spiker
- Current club: (Iran) Labanyat Haraz Amol

Career
Years	Teams
–2010; 2010–2012; 2012–2013; 2013–2014; 2014–2016; 2016–2018; 2018–2019; 2019–2020; 2020-2021; 2021–2022; 2022-	(Iran) Esteghlal Gonbad (Iran) BEEM Mazandaran (Iran) Javaheri Gonbad (Iran) Havash Gonbad (Iran) Kalleh Mazandaran (Iran) Barij Essence Kashan (Iran) Paykan Tehran (Iran) Sarmayeh Bank Tehran (Turkey) Ziraat Bankası Ankara (Iran) Shahrdari Urmia (Qatar) Al Rayyan (Iran) Sepahan S.C. (Iran) Foolad Sirjan Iranian

National team
2011–2020	Iran U19; Iran U21; Iran
Honours
Representing Iran
Men's volleyball
World Grand Champions Cup
Bronze medal – third place	2017 Japan	Team
Asian Championship
Gold medal – first place	2013 Dubai	Team
Gold medal – first place	2019 Tehran	Team
Asian Games
Gold medal – first place	2014 Incheon	Team
Gold medal – first place	2018 Jakarta–Palembang	Team

Farhad Ghaemi (Arabic: فرهاد قائمی; born 28 August 1989) is an Iranian Turkmen volleyball player from Iran, who plays as an outside spiker for the Men's National Team. He competed at the 2016 Summer Olympics in Rio de Janeiro, Brazil. His ethnicity is Iranian Turkmen. Ghaemi had his debut national match in the 2012 Summer Olympics qualification with an invitation from Julio Velasco. He is currently playing with Foolad Sirjan Iranian.

== Honours ==
=== National team ===
- World Grand Champions Cup
  - Bronze medal (1): 2017
- Asian Championship
  - Gold medal (2): 2013, 2019
- Asian Games
  - Gold medal (2): 2014, 2018
- Asian U20 Championship
  - Gold medal (1): 2008
- U19 World Championship
  - Gold medal (1): 2007
- Asian U18 Championship
  - Gold medal (1): 2007

=== Club ===
- Asian Championship
  - Gold medal (2): 2013 (Kalleh), 2016, 2017 (Sarmayeh Bank)
- Iranian Super League
  - Champions (2): 2013 (Kalleh), 2015 (Paykan)

=== Individual ===
- Best spiker: 2009 U21 World Championship
- Best server: 2013 Asian Club Championship
