= 2017 Asian Men's Club Volleyball Championship =

2017 Asian Men's Club Championship
Tournament details
- Host country: Vietnam
- Dates: 28 June – 6 July
- Teams: 13
- Venues: 2 (in 2 host cities)

Final positions
- Champions: (Iran) Sarmayeh Bank Tehran (2nd title)

Tournament awards
- MVP: (Iran) Shahram Mahmoudi (SAR)

The 2017 Asian Men's Club Volleyball Championship was the 18th staging of the AVC Club Championships. The tournament was held in Ninh Bình and Nam Định, Vietnam from 28 June to 6 July 2017.

== Pools composition ==
Teams were seeded in the first two positions of each pool following the Serpentine system according to their final standing of the 2016 edition. AVC reserved the right to seed the hosts as head of pool A regardless of the final standing of the 2016 edition. All teams not seeded were drawn in Bangkok, Thailand on 27 February 2017. But, United Arab Emirates later withdrew. Final standing of the 2016 edition are shown in brackets except the hosts who ranked 7th.

Pool A	Pool B	Pool C	Pool D
Vietnam (Hosts)	Iran (1)	Qatar (2)	Japan (3)
Iraq (10)	Chinese Taipei (6)	Kazakhstan (5)	China (4)
Sri Lanka (–)	~~United Arab Emirates (12)~~	Hong Kong (14)	Maldives (–)
		Australia (–)	Thailand (11)

== Venues ==
- Ninh Bình Gymnasium, Ninh Bình, Vietnam – Preliminary round, Pool E, F, Quarterfinals and Final four
- Nam Định Gymnasium, Nam Định, Vietnam – Preliminary round, Pool E, G, 5th-8th places and 9th–12th places

== Pool standing procedure ==
1. Number of matches won
2. Match points
3. Sets ratio
4. Points ratio
5. Result of the last match between the tied teams

Match won 3–0 or 3–1: 3 match points for the winner, 0 match points for the loser
Match won 3–2: 2 match points for the winner, 1 match point for the loser

== Preliminary round ==
- All times are Vietnam Standard Time (UTC+07:00).

=== Pool A ===
Pos	Team	Pld	W	L	Pts	SW	SL	SR	SPW	SPL	SPR	Qualification
1	Vietnam	2	2	0	6	6	2	3.000	190	177	1.073	Pool E
2	(Iraq) Al-Bahri SC	2	1	1	3	4	3	1.333	164	162	1.012	Pool E
3	Sri Lanka	2	0	2	0	1	6	0.167	153	168	0.911	Pool G

Date	Time		Score		Set 1	Set 2	Set 3	Set 4	Set 5	Total	Report
28 Jun	20:00	Vietnam	3–1	(Iraq) Al-Bahri SC	22–25	25–20	25–21	25–23		97–89	P2
29 Jun	20:00	Al-Bahri SC (Iraq)	3–0	Sri Lanka	25–21	25–21	25–23			75–65	P2
30 Jun	20:00	Sri Lanka	1–3	Vietnam	19–25	25–17	24–26	20–25		88–93	P2

=== Pool B ===
Pos	Team	Pld	W	L	Pts	SW	SL	SR	SPW	SPL	SPR	Qualification
1	(Iran) Sarmayeh Bank Tehran	1	1	0	3	3	0	MAX	75	60	1.250	Pool F
2	(Chinese Taipei) Taichung Bank	1	0	1	0	0	3	0.000	60	75	0.800	Pool F

Date	Time		Score		Set 1	Set 2	Set 3	Set 4	Set 5	Total	Report
29 Jun	20:00	Sarmayeh Bank Tehran (Iran)	3–0	(Chinese Taipei) Taichung Bank	25–19	25–20	25–21			75–60	P2

=== Pool C ===
Pos	Team	Pld	W	L	Pts	SW	SL	SR	SPW	SPL	SPR	Qualification
1	(Kazakhstan) Altay	3	3	0	9	9	0	MAX	228	169	1.349	Pool E
2	(Qatar) Al Arabi	3	2	1	6	6	3	2.000	221	180	1.228	Pool E
3	(Hong Kong) Yan Chai	3	1	2	2	3	8	0.375	201	255	0.788	Pool G
4	(Australia) Canberra Heat	3	0	3	1	2	9	0.222	201	247	0.814	Pool G

Date	Time		Score		Set 1	Set 2	Set 3	Set 4	Set 5	Total	Report
28 Jun	15:00	Altay (Kazakhstan)	3–0	(Hong Kong) Yan Chai	25–15	25–21	25–20			75–56	P2
28 Jun	17:30	Al Arabi (Qatar)	3–0	(Australia) Canberra Heat	25–15	25–18	25–21			75–54	P2
29 Jun	15:00	Canberra Heat (Australia)	0–3	(Kazakhstan) Altay	8–25	18–25	16–25			42–75	P2
29 Jun	17:30	Al Arabi (Qatar)	3–0	(Hong Kong) Yan Chai	25–14	25–15	25–19			75–48	P2
30 Jun	17:30	Al Arabi (Qatar)	0–3	(Kazakhstan) Altay	25–27	24–26	22–25			71–78	P2
30 Jun	17:30	Yan Chai (Hong Kong)	3–2	(Australia) Canberra Heat	25–18	10–25	18–25	29–27	15–10	97–105	P2

=== Pool D ===
Pos	Team	Pld	W	L	Pts	SW	SL	SR	SPW	SPL	SPR	Qualification
1	(Japan) Toyoda Gosei Trefuerza	3	3	0	9	9	0	MAX	227	151	1.503	Pool F
2	(China) Beijing BAIC Motor	3	2	1	5	6	5	1.200	232	219	1.059	Pool F
3	(Thailand) Air Force	3	1	2	4	5	6	0.833	238	226	1.053	Pool H
4	Maldives	3	0	3	0	0	9	0.000	124	225	0.551	Pool H

Date	Time		Score		Set 1	Set 2	Set 3	Set 4	Set 5	Total	Report
28 Jun	15:00	Toyoda Gosei Trefuerza (Japan)	3–0	(Thailand) Air Force	25–17	27–25	25–20			77–62	P2
28 Jun	17:30	Beijing BAIC Motor (China)	3–0	Maldives	25–11	25–9	25–23			75–43	P2
29 Jun	15:00	Air Force (Thailand)	2–3	(China) Beijing BAIC Motor	18–25	21–25	25–23	25–16	12–15	101–104	P2
29 Jun	17:30	Toyoda Gosei Trefuerza (Japan)	3–0	Maldives	25–14	25–8	25–14			75–36	P2
30 Jun	15:00	Maldives	0–3	(Thailand) Air Force	15–25	9–25	21–25			45–75	P2
30 Jun	20:00	Toyoda Gosei Trefuerza (Japan)	3–0	(China) Beijing BAIC Motor	25–19	25–15	25–19			75–53	P2

== Classification round ==
- All times are Vietnam Standard Time (UTC+07:00).
- The results and the points of the matches between the same teams that were already played during the preliminary round shall be taken into account for the classification round.

=== Pool E ===
Pos	Team	Pld	W	L	Pts	SW	SL	SR	SPW	SPL	SPR	Qualification
1	(Kazakhstan) Altay	3	3	0	9	9	2	4.500	271	234	1.158	Quarterfinals
2	(Qatar) Al Arabi	3	2	1	6	6	3	2.000	221	193	1.145	Quarterfinals
3	Vietnam	3	1	2	3	4	7	0.571	245	261	0.939	Quarterfinals
4	(Iraq) Al-Bahri SC	3	0	3	0	2	9	0.222	219	268	0.817	Quarterfinals

Date	Time		Score		Set 1	Set 2	Set 3	Set 4	Set 5	Total	Report
02 Jul	17:30	Altay (Kazakhstan)	3–1	(Iraq) Al-Bahri SC	21–25	25–8	25–19	25–22		96–74	P2
02 Jul	20:00	Vietnam	0–3	(Qatar) Al Arabi	15–25	22–25	22–25			59–75	P2
03 Jul	17:30	Al-Bahri SC (Iraq)	0–3	(Qatar) Al Arabi	22–25	15–25	19–25			56–75	P2
03 Jul	20:00	Vietnam	1–3	(Kazakhstan) Altay	21–25	22–25	25–22	21–25		89–97	P2

=== Pool F ===
Pos	Team	Pld	W	L	Pts	SW	SL	SR	SPW	SPL	SPR	Qualification
1	(Iran) Sarmayeh Bank Tehran	3	3	0	9	9	1	9.000	244	190	1.284	Quarterfinals
2	(Japan) Toyoda Gosei Trefuerza	3	2	1	6	6	4	1.500	233	204	1.142	Quarterfinals
3	(Chinese Taipei) Taichung Bank	3	1	2	3	4	7	0.571	240	273	0.879	Quarterfinals
4	(China) Beijing BAIC Motor	3	0	3	0	2	9	0.222	223	273	0.817	Quarterfinals

Date	Time		Score		Set 1	Set 2	Set 3	Set 4	Set 5	Total	Report
02 Jul	15:00	Sarmayeh Bank Tehran (Iran)	3–1	(China) Beijing BAIC Motor	25–14	19–25	25–18	25–15		94–72	P2
02 Jul	20:00	Toyoda Gosei Trefuerza (Japan)	3–1	(Chinese Taipei) Taichung Bank	25–27	25–19	25–13	25–17		100–76	P2
03 Jul	15:00	Sarmayeh Bank Tehran (Iran)	3–0	(Japan) Toyoda Gosei Trefuerza	25–14	25–22	25–22			75–58	P2
03 Jul	20:00	Taichung Bank (Chinese Taipei)	3–1	(China) Beijing BAIC Motor	26–28	26–24	25–21	27–25		104–98	P2

=== Pool G ===
Pos	Team	Pld	W	L	Pts	SW	SL	SR	SPW	SPL	SPR	Qualification
1	(Australia) Canberra Heat	2	1	1	4	5	4	1.250	192	179	1.073	9th–12th semifinals
2	Sri Lanka	2	1	1	3	4	4	1.000	182	170	1.071	9th–12th semifinals
3	(Hong Kong) Yan Chai	2	1	1	2	4	5	0.800	180	205	0.878	13th place

Date	Time		Score		Set 1	Set 2	Set 3	Set 4	Set 5	Total	Report
02 Jul	17:30	Sri Lanka	1–3	(Australia) Canberra Heat	19–25	25–12	20–25	18–25		82–87	P2
03 Jul	17:30	Sri Lanka	3–1	(Hong Kong) Yan Chai	25–20	25–17	25–27	25–19		100–83	P2

=== Pool H ===
Pos	Team	Pld	W	L	Pts	SW	SL	SR	SPW	SPL	SPR	Qualification
1	(Thailand) Air Force	1	1	0	3	3	0	MAX	75	45	1.667	9th–12th semifinals
2	Maldives	1	0	1	0	0	3	0.000	45	75	0.600	9th–12th semifinals

== Final round ==
- All times are Vietnam Standard Time (UTC+07:00).

=== 9th–12th places ===
9th–12th semifinals
04 July
(Australia) Canberra Heat	3
Maldives	2
04 July
(Thailand) Air Force	3
Sri Lanka	0

9th place match
05 July
(Australia) Canberra Heat	0
(Thailand) Air Force	3
11th place match
05 July
Maldives	1
Sri Lanka	3

==== 9th–12th semifinals ====
Date	Time		Score		Set 1	Set 2	Set 3	Set 4	Set 5	Total	Report
04 Jul	17:30	Canberra Heat (Australia)	3–2	Maldives	26–24	22–25	25–17	21–25	15–12	109–103	P2
04 Jul	20:00	Air Force (Thailand)	3–0	Sri Lanka	25–17	25–23	27–25			77–65	P2

==== 11th place match ====
Date	Time		Score		Set 1	Set 2	Set 3	Set 4	Set 5	Total	Report
05 Jul	17:00	Maldives	1–3	Sri Lanka	25–20	22–25	18–25	18–25		83–95	P2

==== 9th place match ====
Date	Time		Score		Set 1	Set 2	Set 3	Set 4	Set 5	Total	Report
05 Jul	20:00	Canberra Heat (Australia)	0–3	(Thailand) Air Force	20–25	15–25	21–25			56–75	P2

=== Final eight ===
Quarterfinals
04 July
(Kazakhstan) Altay	3
(China) Beijing BAIC Motor	0
04 July
(Japan) Toyoda Gosei Trefuerza	3
Vietnam	0
04 July
(Iran) Sarmayeh Bank Tehran	3
(Iraq) Al-Bahri SC	1
04 July
(Qatar) Al Arabi	3
(Chinese Taipei) Taichung Bank	0

Semifinals
05 July
(Kazakhstan) Altay	0
(Japan) Toyoda Gosei Trefuerza	3
06 July
(Iran) Sarmayeh Bank Tehran	3
(Qatar) Al Arabi	0

Final
06 July
(Japan) Toyoda Gosei Trefuerza	0
(Iran) Sarmayeh Bank Tehran	3
3rd place match
06 July
(Kazakhstan) Altay	1
(Qatar) Al Arabi	3

5th–8th semifinals
05 July
(Iraq) Al-Bahri SC	3
(Chinese Taipei) Taichung Bank	2
05 July
(China) Beijing BAIC Motor	3
Vietnam	0

5th place match
06 July
(Iraq) Al-Bahri SC	3
(China) Beijing BAIC Motor	1
7th place match
06 July
(Chinese Taipei) Taichung Bank	3
Vietnam	1

==== Quarterfinals ====
Date	Time		Score		Set 1	Set 2	Set 3	Set 4	Set 5	Total	Report
04 Jul	12:30	Sarmayeh Bank Tehran (Iran)	3–1	(Iraq) Al-Bahri SC	25–12	25–13	23–25	25-16		98–50	P2
04 Jul	15:00	Altay (Kazakhstan)	3–0	(China) Beijing BAIC Motor	25–19	25–22	25–14			75–55	P2
04 Jul	17:30	Al Arabi (Qatar)	3–0	(Chinese Taipei) Taichung Bank	25–19	25–22	25–16			75–57	P2
04 Jul	20:00	Toyoda Gosei Trefuerza (Japan)	3–0	Vietnam	25–19	25–20	25–21			75–60	P2

==== 5th–8th semifinals ====
Date	Time		Score		Set 1	Set 2	Set 3	Set 4	Set 5	Total	Report
05 Jul	12:30	Al-Bahri SC (Iraq)	3–2	(Chinese Taipei) Taichung Bank	20–25	25–23	23–25	25–19	15–13	108–105	P2
05 Jul	15:00	Beijing BAIC Motor (China)	3–0	Vietnam	26–24	25–19	25–19			76–62	P2

==== Semifinals ====
Date	Time		Score		Set 1	Set 2	Set 3	Set 4	Set 5	Total	Report
05 Jul	17:30	Altay (Kazakhstan)	0–3	(Japan) Toyoda Gosei Trefuerza	16–25	22–25	22–25			60–75	P2
05 Jul	20:00	Sarmayeh Bank Tehran (Iran)	3–0	(Qatar) Al Arabi	25–23	25–17	25–19			75–59	P2

==== 7th place match ====
Date	Time		Score		Set 1	Set 2	Set 3	Set 4	Set 5	Total	Report
06 Jul	15:00	Taichung Bank (Chinese Taipei)	3–1	Vietnam	21–25	25–20	25–22	25–17		96–84	P2

==== 5th place match ====
Date	Time		Score		Set 1	Set 2	Set 3	Set 4	Set 5	Total	Report
06 Jul	10:00	Al-Bahri SC (Iraq)	3–1	(China) Beijing BAIC Motor	25–14	25–14	19–25	25–22		94–75	P2

==== 3rd place match ====
Date	Time		Score		Set 1	Set 2	Set 3	Set 4	Set 5	Total	Report
06 Jul	17:30	Altay (Kazakhstan)	1–3	(Qatar) Al Arabi	25–22	13–25	20–25	19–25		77–97	P2

==== Final ====
Date	Time		Score		Set 1	Set 2	Set 3	Set 4	Set 5	Total	Report
06 Jul	20:00	Toyoda Gosei Trefuerza (Japan)	0–3	(Iran) Sarmayeh Bank Tehran	37–39	14–25	23–25			74–89	P2

== Final standing ==
Rank	Team
1st place, gold medalist(s)	(Iran) Sarmayeh Bank Tehran
2nd place, silver medalist(s)	(Japan) Toyoda Gosei Trefuerza
3rd place, bronze medalist(s)	(Qatar) Al Arabi
4	(Kazakhstan) Altay
5	(Iraq) Al-Bahri SC
6	(China) Beijing BAIC Motor
7	(Chinese Taipei) Taichung Bank
8	Vietnam
9	(Thailand) Air Force
10	(Australia) Canberra Heat
11	Sri Lanka
12	Maldives
13	(Hong Kong) Yan Chai

Qualified for the 2018 Club World Championship

2017 Asian Men's Club Champions

2nd title

14–man Roster
Mahmoudi, Ebadipour, Ghaemi, Mousavi, G. Karkhaneh, Zarif, Gholami, Davoudi, Mahdavi (c), Shafiei, Żygadło, Jalali, Yousefi, Heidarishahi
Head coach
M. Karkhaneh

== Awards ==
- Most Valuable Player
  (Iran) Shahram Mahmoudi (Sarmayeh Bank Tehran)
- Best Setter
  (Poland) Łukasz Żygadło (Sarmayeh Bank Tehran)
- Best Outside Spikers
  (Japan) Shuzo Yamada (Toyoda Gosei Trefuerza)
  (Iran) Milad Ebadipour (Sarmayeh Bank Tehran)
- Best Middle Blockers
  (Iran) Mohammad Mousavi (Sarmayeh Bank Tehran)
  (Kazakhstan) Damir Akimov (Altay)
- Best Opposite Spiker
  (Germany) György Grozer (Al Arabi)
- Best Libero
  (Japan) Koichiro Koga (Toyoda Gosei Trefuerza)
