= Adel Gholami =

Iranian volleyball player

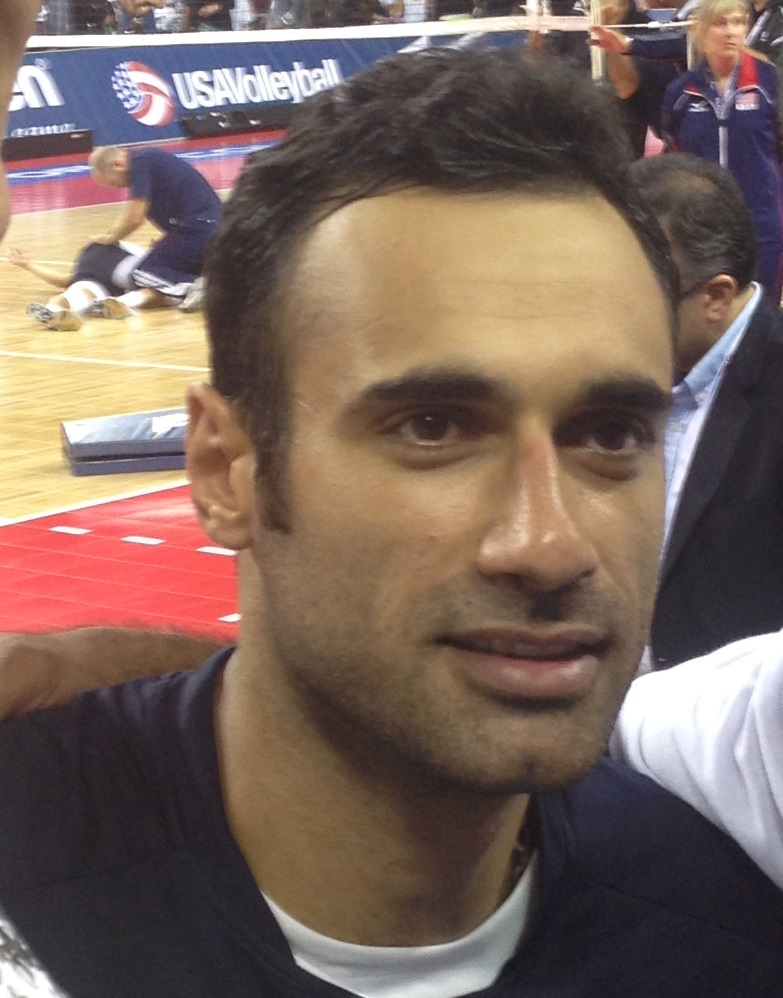

Personal information
- Born: February 9, 1986 (age 40); Amol, Iran
- Height: 1.95 m (6 ft 5 in)
- Weight: 88 kg (194 lb)
- Spike: 341 cm (134 in)
- Block: 330 cm (130 in)

Volleyball information
- Position: Middle Blocker
- Current club: Haraz Amol
- Number: 9

National team
2008–2018	Iran
Honours
Representing Iran
Men's volleyball
Asian Championship
Gold medal – first place	2013 Dubai	Team
Silver medal – second place	2009 Manila	Team
Asian Games
Gold medal – first place	2014 Incheon	Team
Silver medal – second place	2010 Guangzhou	Team

Adel Gholami (Persian: عادل غلامی, born 9 February 1986 in Amol) is a volleyball player from Iran, who plays as a middle blocker for the Iran men's national team and the club Haraz Amol. Gholami competed at the Rio 2016 Summer Olympics.

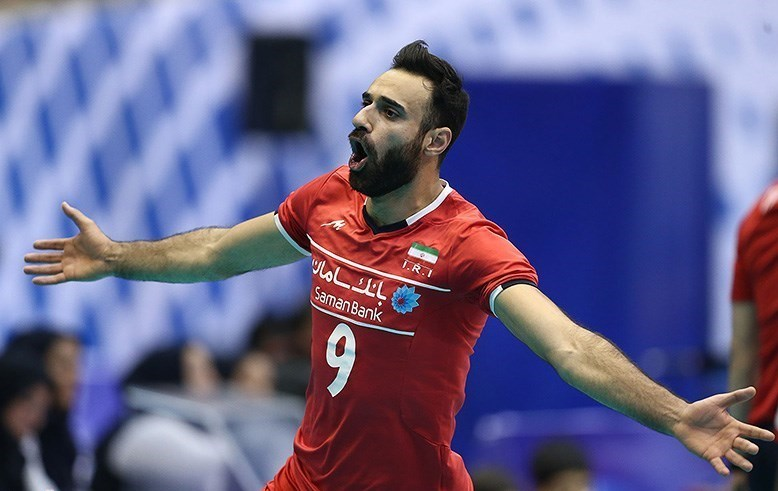
2014 FIVB World League, Iran vs Poland

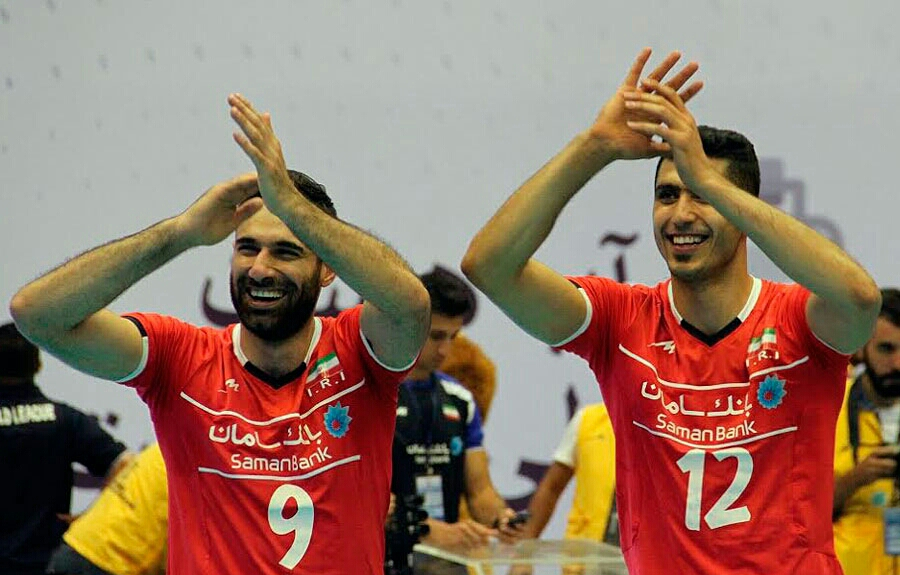
Mojtaba Mirzajanpour (Right) - Adel Gholami (left)

== Career ==
=== National team ===
He was invited to national team in 2008. Gholami playing in two World Championship 2010, 2014. They won the gold medals at the Asian Volleyball Championship and the 2014 Asian Games.

=== Clubs ===
Adel Gholami started playing volleyball in Amol. He started his career in his hometown volleyball club Abfa Amol. He has played for Narenjestan Noor, Sanam Tehran, Paykan Tehran, Pegah Urmia and Saipa. In a remarkable display of Saipa and Pegah game made. Gholami later joined Kalleh. In 2012, he was captain of the team and its luster with the Kalleh reached the winner Asian Championship. He is a four time gold medal winner in Iranian Super League.

== Honours ==
=== National team ===
- Asian Championship
  - Gold medal (1): 2013
  - Silver medal (1): 2009
- Asian Games
  - Gold medal (1): 2014
  - Silver medal (1): 2010

=== Club ===
- Asian Championship
  - Gold medal (4): 2013 (Kalleh), 2016, 2017 (Sarmayeh Bank), 2018 (Khatam Ardakan)
- Iranian Super League
  - Champions (4): 2012, 2013 (Kalleh), 2016, 2017 (Sarmayeh Bank)

=== Individual ===
- Best blocker: 2010 Asian Games
- Best blocker: 2012 Asian Club Championship
- Best blocker: 2018 Asian Club Championship
