= Mehdi Mahdavi =

Iranian volleyball player

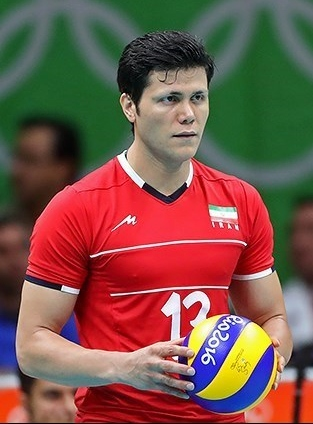
- Mahdavi at the 2016 Olympics

Personal information
- Full name: Mehdi Mahdavi
- Born: 13 February 1984 (age 42); Karaj, Iran
- Height: 1.91 m (6 ft 3 in)
- Weight: 96 kg (212 lb)
- Spike: 3.30 m (130 in)
- Block: 3.10 m (122 in)

Volleyball information
- Position: Setter
- Current club: (Iran) Sarmayeh Bank Tehran
- Number: 13

Career
Years	Teams
2004–2005; 2005–2006; 2006–2007; 2007–2008; 2008–2009; 2009–2010; 2010–2012; 2012–2013; 2013–2014; 2014–2015; 2015–	(Iran) Bargh Tehran (Iran) Azarpayam Urmia (Iran) Gol Gohar Sirjan (Iran) Shahrdari Hamedan (Iran) Foolad Urmia (Iran) Damash Gilan (Iran) Saipa Tehran (Iran) Pishgaman Kavir (Iran) Barij Kashan (Iran) Mizan Khorasan (Iran) Sarmayeh Bank Tehran
Honours
Men's volleyball
Representing Iran
Asian Championship
Gold medal – first place	2011 Tehran	Team
Gold medal – first place	2013 Dubai	Team
Silver medal – second place	2009 Manila	Team
Asian Games
Gold medal – first place	2014 Incheon	Team
Silver medal – second place	2010 Guangzhou	Team
Asian Cup
Gold medal – first place	2008 Nakhon Ratchasima	Team
Gold medal – first place	2010 Urmia	Team

Mehdi Mahdavi (Persian: مهدی مهدوی, born 13 February 1984) is an Iranian volleyball player, who former played as a setter for the Iran national team of the year 2007–2016. After competing at the 2016 Summer Olympics he announced his retirement from the national team aiming to give more chances to younger players. Mahdavi is married and has a daughter and a son.

== Honours ==
=== National team ===
- Asian Championship
  - Gold medal (2): 2011, 2013
  - Silver medal (1): 2009
- Asian Games
  - Gold medal (1): 2014
  - Silver medal (1): 2010
- Asian Cup
  - Gold medal (2): 2008, 2010
- Asian U20 Championship
  - Gold medal (1): 2002
- U19 World Championship
  - Silver medal (1): 2001
- Asian U18 Championship
  - Gold medal (1): 2001

=== Club ===
- Asian Championship
  - Gold medal (2): 2016, 2017 (Sarmayeh Bank)
- Iranian Super League
  - Champions (1): 2016 (Sarmayeh Bank)

=== Individual ===
- Best setter: 2016 Asian Club Championship
