= 2016–17 Iranian Volleyball Super League =

Locations of the 2016–17 season teams

The Iranian Volleyball Super League 2016–17 was the 30th season of the Iranian Volleyball Super League, the highest professional volleyball league in Iran.

== Regular season ==
=== Standings ===
Rank	Team	Matches			Pts	Details						Sets		
Rank	Team	Pld	W	L	Pts	3–0	3–1	3–2	2–3	1–3	0–3	W	L	Ratio
1	Sarmayeh Bank Tehran	22	20	2	55	10	5	5	0	2	0	62	21	2.952
2	Paykan Tehran	22	18	4	53	5	9	4	3	1	0	61	29	2.103
3	Shahrdari Urmia	22	14	8	42	8	5	1	1	3	4	47	31	1.516
4	Saipa Tehran	22	12	10	36	5	4	3	3	4	3	46	40	1.150
5	Salehin Varamin	22	11	11	30	4	2	5	2	5	4	42	45	0.933
6	Kalleh Mazandaran	22	10	12	32	6	3	1	3	5	4	41	41	1.000
7	Khatam Ardakan	22	10	12	32	2	6	2	4	4	4	42	46	0.913
8	Shahrdari Tabriz	22	10	12	31	5	3	2	3	3	6	39	43	0.907
9	Sazman Omran Shahrdari Sari	22	10	12	29	3	4	3	2	5	5	39	46	0.848
10	Parseh Tehran	22	8	14	29	4	2	2	7	3	4	41	48	0.854
11	Shahrdari Arak	22	5	17	15	0	4	1	1	7	9	24	57	0.421
12	Havash Gonbad	22	4	18	12	0	2	2	2	7	9	23	60	0.383

=== Results ===
	HAV	KAL	KHA	PAR	PAY	SAI	SAL	SAR	SAZ	ARA	TAB	URM
Havash Gonbad		1–3	3–2	2–3	1–3	1–3	3–2	0–3	3–1	3–1	0–3	1–3
Kalleh	3–0		3–1	3–2	2–3	3–0	2–3	0–3	1–3	3–1	3–0	1–3
Khatam	3–1	0–3		3–2	0–3	1–3	3–1	0–3	3–2	3–0	3–1	1–3
Parseh	3–0	0–3	1–3		3–1	0–3	3–0	2–3	2–3	3–0	3–2	0–3
Paykan	3–0	3–1	3–1	3–1		3–2	3–0	2–3	3–0	3–1	2–3	3–1
Saipa	3–2	3–1	3–2	1–3	2–3		2–3	0–3	3–0	1–3	3–0	3–0
Salehin	3–0	3–2	0–3	3–2	1–3	3–1		1–3	3–0	1–3	3–0	3–0
Sarmayeh Bank	3–0	3–0	3–2	3–1	3–2	3–0	1–3		3–0	3–1	3–0	1–3
Sazman Omran	3–1	3–0	1–3	3–2	1–3	1–3	3–2	2–3		3–1	3–1	3–0
Shahrdari Arak	3–1	0–3	3–2	0–3	0–3	2–3	3–1	1–3	0–3		0–3	0–3
Shahrdari Tabriz	3–0	3–1	1–3	3–2	2–3	0–3	3–0	0–3	3–1	3–1		3–0
Shahrdari Urmia	3–0	3–0	3–0	3–0	1–3	3–1	2–3	1–3	3–0	3–0	3–2	

== Playoffs ==
- All times are Iran Standard Time (UTC+03:30).
- All series were the best-of-three format.

Quarterfinals
1	Sarmayeh Bank	3	3	—
8	Shahrdari Tabriz	2	0	—
4	Saipa	3	0	3
5	Salehin	1	3	2
2	Paykan	3	3	—
7	Khatam	1	1	—
3	Shahrdari Urmia	3	1	3
6	Kalleh	1	3	2

Semifinals
1	Sarmayeh Bank	3	3	—
4	Saipa	1	1	—
2	Paykan	3	0	3
3	Shahrdari Urmia	0	3	1

Final
1	Sarmayeh Bank	3	3	—
2	Paykan	2	0	—
3rd place
4	Saipa	1	2	—
3	Shahrdari Urmia	3	3	—

=== Quarterfinals ===
Sarmayeh Bank Tehran vs. Shahrdari Tabriz

Date	Time		Score		Set 1	Set 2	Set 3	Set 4	Set 5	Total
9 Feb	17:00	Sarmayeh Bank Tehran	3–2	Shahrdari Tabriz	25–22	24–26	23–25	25–16	15–13	112–102
16 Feb	16:00	Shahrdari Tabriz	0–3	Sarmayeh Bank Tehran	14–25	18–25	20–25			52–75

Saipa Tehran vs. Salehin Varamin

Date	Time		Score		Set 1	Set 2	Set 3	Set 4	Set 5	Total
9 Feb	19:00	Saipa Tehran	3–1	Salehin Varamin	25–21	21–25	25–23	25–16		96–85
16 Feb	16:00	Salehin Varamin	3–0	Saipa Tehran	25–23	26–24	25–13			76–60
20 Feb	16:00	Saipa Tehran	3–2	Salehin Varamin	25–21	16–25	18–25	25–23	15–13	99–107

Paykan Tehran vs. Khatam Ardakan

Date	Time		Score		Set 1	Set 2	Set 3	Set 4	Set 5	Total
9 Feb	15:00	Paykan Tehran	3–1	Khatam Ardakan	25–18	25–20	21–25	25–21		96–84
16 Feb	16:00	Khatam Ardakan	1–3	Paykan Tehran	19–25	16–25	25–19	24–26		84–95

Shahrdari Urmia vs. Kalleh Mazandaran

Date	Time		Score		Set 1	Set 2	Set 3	Set 4	Set 5	Total
9 Feb	16:00	Shahrdari Urmia	3–1	Kalleh Mazandaran	21–25	25–17	25–21	25–22		96–85
16 Feb	16:00	Kalleh Mazandaran	3–1	Shahrdari Urmia	25–23	20–25	25–20	25–21		95–89
20 Feb	16:00	Shahrdari Urmia	3–2	Kalleh Mazandaran	22–25	23–25	25–19	25–23	15–10	110–102

=== Semifinals ===
Sarmayeh Bank Tehran vs. Saipa Tehran

Date	Time		Score		Set 1	Set 2	Set 3	Set 4	Set 5	Total
22 Feb	17:00	Sarmayeh Bank Tehran	3–1	Saipa Tehran	22–25	25–14	25–23	25–23		97–85
28 Feb	16:00	Saipa Tehran	1–3	Sarmayeh Bank Tehran	20–25	22–25	30–28	18–25		90–103

Paykan Tehran vs. Shahrdari Urmia

Date	Time		Score		Set 1	Set 2	Set 3	Set 4	Set 5	Total
22 Feb	15:00	Paykan Tehran	3–0	Shahrdari Urmia	25–20	25–15	25–23			75–58
28 Feb	16:00	Shahrdari Urmia	3–0	Paykan Tehran	25–22	25–23	25–21			75–66
5 Mar	16:00	Paykan Tehran	3–1	Shahrdari Urmia	25–22	25–22	18–25	25–19		93–88

=== 3rd place ===
Saipa Tehran vs. Shahrdari Urmia

Date	Time		Score		Set 1	Set 2	Set 3	Set 4	Set 5	Total
9 Mar	16:00	Shahrdari Urmia	3–1	Saipa Tehran	25–19	25–21	21–25	25–19		96–84
12 Mar	14:30	Saipa Tehran	2–3	Shahrdari Urmia	21–25	23–25	25–16	25–19	14–16	108–101

=== Final ===
Sarmayeh Bank Tehran vs. Paykan Tehran

Date	Time		Score		Set 1	Set 2	Set 3	Set 4	Set 5	Total
9 Mar	17:00	Sarmayeh Bank Tehran	3–2	Paykan Tehran	21–25	20–25	25–22	25–20	15–9	106–101
12 Mar	17:00	Paykan Tehran	0–3	Sarmayeh Bank Tehran	31–33	20–25	18–25			69–83

== Final standings ==
Rank	Team	Qualification or relegation
1	Sarmayeh Bank Tehran	2017 Asian Club Championship
2	Paykan Tehran	
3	Shahrdari Urmia	
4	Saipa Tehran	
5	Salehin Varamin	
6	Kalleh Mazandaran	
7	Khatam Ardakan	
8	Shahrdari Tabriz	
9	Sazman Omran Shahrdari Sari	
10	Parseh Tehran	
11	Shahrdari Arak	Relegation to the first division
12	Havash Gonbad	Relegation to the first division
