= 2017–18 Iranian Volleyball Super League =

Locations of the 2017–18 season teams

The Iranian Volleyball Super League 2017–18 was the 31st season of the Iranian Volleyball Super League, the highest professional volleyball league in Iran.

== Regular season ==
=== Standings ===
Rank	Team	Matches			Pts	Details						Sets		
Rank	Team	Pld	W	L	Pts	3–0	3–1	3–2	2–3	1–3	0–3	W	L	Ratio
1	Sarmayeh Bank Tehran	22	19	3	57	12	7	0	0	3	0	60	16	3.750
2	Saipa Tehran	22	16	6	47	6	7	3	2	2	2	54	31	1.742
3	Shahrdari Tabriz	22	16	6	44	5	6	5	1	2	3	52	34	1.529
4	Shahrdari Varamin	22	13	9	40	3	6	4	5	1	3	50	41	1.220
5	Paykan Tehran	22	13	9	39	9	1	3	3	3	3	48	34	1.412
6	Kalleh Mazandaran	22	13	9	39	6	5	2	2	4	3	47	36	1.306
7	Khatam Ardakan	22	11	11	30	3	4	4	1	7	3	42	45	0.933
8	Havash Gonbad	22	8	14	22	2	3	3	1	6	7	32	51	0.627
9	Shams Tehran	22	8	14	21	1	4	3	3	4	7	34	52	0.654
10	Shahrdari Urmia	22	7	15	23	1	3	3	5	7	3	38	54	0.704
11	Sari 21	22	5	17	20	2	3	0	5	5	7	30	54	0.556
12	Mohtasham Carpet Kashan	22	3	19	11	1	1	1	3	6	10	21	60	0.350

- Shams Tehran was docked 3 points due to the lack of participation in the youth league.

=== Results ===
	HAV	KAL	KHA	MOH	PAY	SAI	S21	SAR	TAB	URM	VAR	SHA
Havash Gonbad		0–3	3–0	3–1	0–3	2–3	0–3	1–3	0–3	3–1	3–1	3–0
Kalleh	3–0		3–1	3–0	3–0	0–3	1–3	1–3	3–2	3–1	3–0	3–0
Khatam	2–3	1–3		3–2	3–1	1–3	3–1	0–3	3–0	1–3	3–0	3–0
Mohtasham Carpet	2–3	1–3	1–3		0–3	0–3	3–0	0–3	1–3	3–1	2–3	1–3
Paykan	2–3	3–2	3–0	3–0		3–2	3–0	0–3	2–3	2–3	3–2	3–1
Saipa	3–1	3–1	3–1	3–0	3–0		3–1	3–1	0–3	3–0	3–2	3–0
Sari 21	3–0	1–3	2–3	3–1	0–3	2–3		0–3	0–3	2–3	0–3	1–3
Sarmayeh Bank	3–0	3–0	3–1	3–0	3–1	3–1	3–0		3–0	3–0	3–0	3–1
Shahrdari Tabriz	3–1	3–2	3–1	3–0	0–3	1–3	3–1	3–1		3–1	3–2	3–0
Shahrdari Urmia	3–1	2–3	1–3	3–0	0–3	3–1	3–2	1–3	2–3		1–3	2–3
Shahrdari Varamin	3–1	3–0	2–3	3–0	3–1	3–2	3–2	3–1	3–1	3–2		2–3
Shams	3–1	3–1	2–3	2–3	0–3	3–0	1–3	0–3	2–3	3–2	1–3	

== Playoffs ==
- All times are Iran Standard Time (UTC+03:30).
- All series were the best-of-three format.

Quarterfinals
1	Sarmayeh Bank	3	3	—
8	Havash	0	0	—
4	Shahrdari Varamin	0	0	—
5	Paykan	3	3	—
2	Saipa	0	0	—
7	Khatam	3	3	—
3	Shahrdari Tabriz	3	3	—
6	Kalleh	1	2	—

Semifinals
1	Sarmayeh Bank	3	3	—
5	Paykan	0	1	—
7	Khatam	3	3	—
3	Shahrdari Tabriz	0	1	—

Final
1	Sarmayeh Bank	3	3	—
7	Khatam	2	1	—
3rd place (Canceled)
5	Paykan	X	X	X
3	Shahrdari Tabriz	X	X	X

=== Quarterfinals ===
Sarmayeh Bank Tehran vs. Havash Gonbad

Date	Time		Score		Set 1	Set 2	Set 3	Set 4	Set 5	Total
7 Feb	17:30	Sarmayeh Bank Tehran	3–0	Havash Gonbad	25–20	25–18	25–14			75–52
14 Feb	17:30	Havash Gonbad	0–3	Sarmayeh Bank Tehran	22–25	25–27	19–25			66–77

Shahrdari Varamin vs. Paykan Tehran

Date	Time		Score		Set 1	Set 2	Set 3	Set 4	Set 5	Total
7 Feb	17:30	Shahrdari Varamin	0–3	Paykan Tehran	21–25	16–25	23–25			60–75
14 Feb	15:00	Paykan Tehran	3–0	Shahrdari Varamin	25–21	25–22	25–21			75–64

Saipa Tehran vs. Khatam Ardakan

Date	Time		Score		Set 1	Set 2	Set 3	Set 4	Set 5	Total
7 Feb	15:00	Saipa Tehran	0–3	Khatam Ardakan	25–27	18–25	17–25			60–77
14 Feb	16:00	Khatam Ardakan	3–0	Saipa Tehran	25–20	27–25	28–26			80–71

Shahrdari Tabriz vs. Kalleh Mazandaran

Date	Time		Score		Set 1	Set 2	Set 3	Set 4	Set 5	Total
7 Feb	17:00	Shahrdari Tabriz	3–1	Kalleh Mazandaran	25–23	22–25	25–22	25–18		97–88
14 Feb	17:30	Kalleh Mazandaran	2–3	Shahrdari Tabriz	23–25	21–25	25–23	25–20	13–15	107–108

=== Semifinals ===
Sarmayeh Bank Tehran vs. Paykan Tehran

Date	Time		Score		Set 1	Set 2	Set 3	Set 4	Set 5	Total
21 Feb	18:00	Sarmayeh Bank Tehran	3–0	Paykan Tehran	25–19	25–18	25–19			75–56
28 Feb	18:00	Paykan Tehran	1–3	Sarmayeh Bank Tehran	23–25	25–22	19–25	27–29		94–101

Khatam Ardakan vs. Shahrdari Tabriz

Date	Time		Score		Set 1	Set 2	Set 3	Set 4	Set 5	Total
21 Feb	16:00	Shahrdari Tabriz	0–3	Khatam Ardakan	21–25	20–25	21–25			62–75
28 Feb	16:00	Khatam Ardakan	3–1	Shahrdari Tabriz	18–25	25–19	25–23	25–19		93–86

=== 3rd place ===
Paykan Tehran vs. Shahrdari Tabriz

- The 3rd place playoffs between Shahrdari Tabriz and Paykan Tehran, initially scheduled for 7, 11 and 14(if necessary) March, were canceled by mutual agreement. The two teams shared the 3rd place.

=== Final ===
Sarmayeh Bank Tehran vs. Khatam Ardakan

Date	Time		Score		Set 1	Set 2	Set 3	Set 4	Set 5	Total
7 Mar	17:00	Sarmayeh Bank Tehran	3–2	Khatam Ardakan	25–19	24–26	25–27	25–15	15–11	114–98
14 Mar	16:00	Khatam Ardakan	1–3	Sarmayeh Bank Tehran	21–25	13–25	25–22	20–25		79–97

== Final standings ==
Rank	Team	Qualification or relegation
1	Sarmayeh Bank Tehran	
2	Khatam Ardakan	2018 Asian Club Championship
3	Paykan Tehran	
3	Shahrdari Tabriz	
5	Saipa Tehran	
6	Shahrdari Varamin	
7	Kalleh Mazandaran	
8	Havash Gonbad	
9	Shams Tehran	
10	Shahrdari Urmia	
11	Sari 21	Relegation to the first division
12	Mohtasham Carpet Kashan	Relegation to the first division

- Champions Sarmayeh Bank Tehran dissolved in March 2018, so runners-up Khatam Ardakan qualified for 2018 Asian Club Championship.
