= 2008–09 Iranian Volleyball Super League =

The following is the final results of the Iranian Volleyball Super League (Innovation and Flourishing Cup) 2008/09 season.

== Standings ==
| | | | Matches | | | Points ratio | Sets | | | Qualification or relegation |
| Rank | Team | Pts | Pld | W | L | Points ratio | W | L | Ratio | Qualification or relegation |
|---|---|---|---|---|---|---|---|---|---|---|
| 1 | Paykan Tehran | 46 | 24 | 22 | 2 | 1.227 | 67 | 13 | 5.154 | 2009 Asian Club Championship |
| 2 | Saipa Tehran | 46 | 24 | 22 | 2 | 1.130 | 68 | 22 | 3.091 | |
| 3 | Foolad Urmia | 39 | 24 | 15 | 9 | 1.053 | 55 | 45 | 1.222 | |
| 3 | BEEM Mazandaran | 39 | 24 | 15 | 9 | 1.050 | 55 | 41 | 1.341 | |
| 5 | Azad University Tehran | 39 | 24 | 15 | 9 | 1.034 | 53 | 41 | 1.293 | |
| 6 | Petrochimi Bandar Imam | 36 | 23 | 13 | 10 | 1.022 | 46 | 37 | 1.243 | |
| 7 | Bank Saderat Iran Mashhad | 34 | 24 | 10 | 14 | 0.964 | 40 | 54 | 0.741 | |
| 8 | Sang Ahan Bafgh | 34 | 24 | 10 | 14 | 0.947 | 42 | 55 | 0.764 | |
| 9 | Padisan Gonbad | 31 | 24 | 8 | 16 | 0.937 | 43 | 59 | 0.729 | |
| 10 | Erteashat Sanati Tehran | 31 | 24 | 7 | 17 | 0.913 | 29 | 58 | 0.500 | |
| 11 | Damash Gilan | 30 | 23 | 7 | 16 | 0.955 | 39 | 56 | 0.696 | |
| 12 | Bargh Kerman | 30 | 24 | 6 | 18 | 0.910 | 33 | 64 | 0.516 | |
| 13 | Gol Gohar Sirjan | 29 | 24 | 5 | 19 | 0.943 | 37 | 62 | 0.597 | |
| — | Shahrdari Hamedan | – | – | – | – | – | – | – | – | Relegation to the first division |

- Shahrdari Hamedan were excluded from the league with five games remaining. All results were declared null and void.
- Foolad and BEEM shared the third place because BEEM had the better points ratio before excluding Shahrdari Hamedan's results from the table.
- The match between Petrochimi and Damash remains unfinished in the fourth set by the match commissioner.

== Results ==
| | AZD | BSI | BRG | BEM | DAM | ERT | FOL | GOL | PAD | PAY | PET | SAI | SNG | HAM |
|---|---|---|---|---|---|---|---|---|---|---|---|---|---|---|
| Azad University | | 3–1 | 3–0 | 1–3 | 3–0 | 3–0 | 1–3 | 3–0 | 3–2 | 0–3 | 2–3 | 0–3 | 3–1 | X |
| Bank Saderat | 3–2 | | 3–2 | 3–1 | 3–2 | 3–0 | 2–3 | 3–0 | 3–1 | 0–3 | 1–3 | 0–3 | 0–3 | 3–0 |
| Bargh Kerman | 1–3 | 3–1 | | 3–2 | 2–3 | 0–3 | 1–3 | 3–2 | 3–1 | 2–3 | 0–3 | 0–3 | 3–2 | 0–3 |
| BEEM | 2–3 | 1–3 | 3–1 | | 3–1 | 3–0 | 3–0 | 3–2 | 3–2 | 3–1 | 0–3 | 2–3 | 3–1 | 3–1 |
| Damash | 2–3 | 2–3 | 3–1 | 1–3 | | 3–1 | 2–3 | 3–1 | 1–3 | 0–3 | 3–1 | 2–3 | 3–1 | 3–2 |
| Erteashat Sanati | 3–0 | 1–3 | 3–1 | 0–3 | 1–3 | | 3–1 | 3–1 | 3–2 | 0–3 | 0–3 | 0–3 | 1–3 | 3–1 |
| Foolad Urmia | 2–3 | 3–0 | 3–0 | 2–3 | 3–1 | 3–1 | | 0–3 | 3–2 | 2–3 | 3–1 | 3–2 | 3–0 | 3–2 |
| Gol Gohar | 0–3 | 3–2 | 2–3 | 3–2 | 3–1 | 2–3 | 2–3 | | 3–0 | 1–3 | 1–3 | 2–3 | 2–3 | 1–3 |
| Padisan Gonbad | 2–3 | 3–2 | 3–1 | 1–3 | 3–2 | 3–1 | 3–1 | 3–2 | | 0–3* | 3–1 | 2–3 | 2–3 | 3–1 |
| Paykan | 3–1 | 3–0 | 3–0 | 3–0 | 3–0 | 3–0 | 3–0 | 3–0 | 3–0 | | 3–0 | 3–0 | 3–0 | 3–0 |
| Petrochimi | 0–3 | 3–0 | 3–0 | 0–3 | X | 3–0 | 2–3 | 3–1 | 3–0 | 1–3 | | 1–3 | 3–1 | X |
| Saipa | 3–1 | 3–0 | 3–1 | 3–0 | 3–0 | 3–1 | 3–2 | 3–0 | 3–0 | 3–0 | 3–0 | | 3–1 | X |
| Sang Ahan | 1–3 | 3–1 | 3–2 | 1–3 | 3–1 | 3–1 | 1–3 | 3–1 | 3–2 | 0–3 | 1–3 | 1–3 | | 3–0 |
| Shahrdari Hamedan | 3–2 | 1–3 | X | 0–3 | 0–3 | 3–2 | 2–3 | 1–3 | X | 0–3 | 1–3 | 0–3 | 1–3 | |

* Forfeit
