= Armin Tashakkori =

Iranian volleyball player

Armin Tashakori
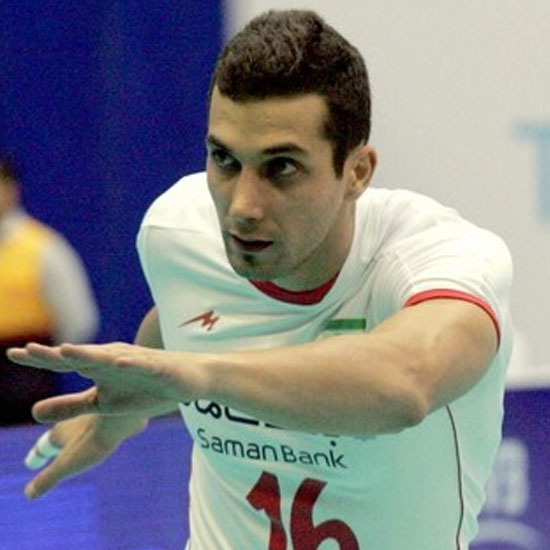

Personal information
- Nationality: Iranian
- Born: 8 December 1986 (age 39); Hamedan, Iran
- Height: 198 cm (6 ft 6 in)
- Weight: 96 kg (212 lb)
- Spike: 360 cm (142 in)
- Block: 350 cm (138 in)

Volleyball information
- Current club: Foolad Sirjan Iranian
- Number: 18

Career
Years	Teams
2008-09; 2009-10; 2010-11; 2011-13; 2013-14; 2014-15; 2015-17; 2017-18; 2018-19; 2019-20; 2020-	Shahrdari Hamedan; Sange Ahan Bafgh; Pishgaman Yazd; Saipa Karaj; Barij Essence; Mizan Khorasan; Shahrdari Urmia; Shahrdari Varamin; Paykan Tehran; Saipa Tehran; Foolad Sirjan Iranian

National team
(Iran) Iran2010_2016
Honours
Representing Iran
Men's volleyball
Asian Games
Gold medal – first place	2014 Incheon	Team
AVC Asian Championship
Gold medal – first place	2013 Dubai	Team
Olympic Qualification
Silver medal – second place	2015 Tokyo	Team
Military World Games
Gold medal – first place	2011 Tehran	Team

Armin Tashakori (Persian: آرمین تشکری, born 8 December 1986, in Hamedan) is an Iranian volleyball player who plays for Matin Varamin and Iran men's national volleyball team.

== Honours ==
=== National team ===
- Asian Championship
  - 2013 Dubai
- Asian Games
  - 2014 Incheon
- Military World Games
  - 2011 Tehran

=== Club ===
- 2011-2012 Iranian Runner-up with Saipa Karaj
- 2015-2016 Iranian Third place with Shahrdari Urmia
- 2016-2017 Iranian Third place with Shahrdari Urmia
- 2019-2020 Iranian Runner-up with Saipa Tehran

=== Individual ===
- Best middle blocker: 2011 Rio World Military Games
