= Arash Kamalvand =

Iranian volleyball player (born 1989)

Personal information
- Full name: Arash Kamalvand
- Born: May 11, 1989 (age 37); Khorramabad, Iran
- Height: 2.01 m (6 ft 7 in)
- Weight: 91 kg (201 lb)
- Spike: 334 cm (131 in)
- Block: 320 cm (130 in)

Volleyball information
- Position: Outside hitter

Career
Years	Teams
2007–2008; 2008–2009; 2009–2010; 2010–2018; 2018–2019; 2019–2020	Steel Azin Tehran; Petrochimi Bandar Imam; Paykan Tehran; Saipa Alborz; Folad Sirjan Iranian; Alarabi Kuwait

National team
2005–2007; 2008–2009; 2009–2013	Iran U19; Iran U21; Iran
Honours
Representing Iran
Men's volleyball
Asian Games
Silver medal – second place	2010 Guangzhou	Team
Asian Championship
Gold medal – first place	2011 Tehran	Team
AVC Cup
Gold medal – first place	2010 Urmia	Team

Arash Kamalvand (Persian: آرش کمالوند, born May 11, 1989, in Khorramabad) is a former volleyball player from Iran who played as an outside hitter for the Men's National Team from 2009 to 2013. Kamalvand was named Most Valuable Player in the 2011 Asian Championship ,

== Honours ==
=== National team ===
- Asian Championship
  - Gold medal (1): 2011
- Asian Games
  - Silver medal (1): 2010
- AVC Cup
  - Gold medal (1): 2010
- Asian Junior Championship
  - Gold medal (1): 2008
- Asian Youth Championship
  - Gold medal (1): 2007

=== Club ===
- World Championship
  - Bronze medal (1): 2010 (Paykan)
- Iranian Super League
  - Champions (1): 2010 (Paykan)

=== Individual ===
- MVP: 2011 Asian Championship
