= 2009 Asian Women's Club Volleyball Championship =

2009 Asian Club Championship

Tournament details
- Host country: Thailand
- Dates: 1–7 June
- Teams: 11
- Venue: 1 (in 1 host city)

Final positions
- Champions: (Thailand) Federbrau (1st title)

Tournament awards
- MVP: (Thailand) Onuma Sittirak

The 2009 Asian Women's Club Volleyball Championship was the 10th staging of the AVC Club Championships. The tournament was held in Nakhon Pathom, Thailand.

== Pools composition ==
The teams are seeded based on their final ranking at the 2008 Asian Women's Club Volleyball Championship.

| Pool A | Pool B |
|---|---|
| Thailand (Host & 2nd); North Korea (4th); Chinese Taipei; Iran; Uzbekistan | China (1st); Japan (3rd); Kazakhstan; Vietnam; Indonesia; Afghanistan |

== Preliminary round ==
=== Pool A ===
| Pos | Team | Pld | W | L | Pts | SW | SL | SR | SPW | SPL | SPR | Qualification |
|---|---|---|---|---|---|---|---|---|---|---|---|---|
| 1 | (Thailand) Federbrau | 4 | 4 | 0 | 8 | 12 | 0 | MAX | 300 | 161 | 1.863 | Final round |
| 2 | (North Korea) Sobaeksu | 4 | 3 | 1 | 7 | 9 | 4 | 2.250 | 291 | 231 | 1.260 | Final round |
| 3 | Chinese Taipei | 4 | 2 | 2 | 6 | 7 | 7 | 1.000 | 284 | 292 | 0.973 | Final round |
| 4 | (Iran) Saipa Tehran | 4 | 1 | 3 | 5 | 4 | 9 | 0.444 | 245 | 305 | 0.803 | Final round |
| 5 | (Uzbekistan) SKIF | 4 | 0 | 4 | 4 | 0 | 12 | 0.000 | 169 | 300 | 0.563 | |

| Date | Time | | Score | | Set 1 | Set 2 | Set 3 | Set 4 | Set 5 | Total | Report |
|---|---|---|---|---|---|---|---|---|---|---|---|
| 01 Jun | 14:00 | Saipa Tehran (Iran) | 0–3 | (North Korea) Sobaeksu | 17–25 | 18–25 | 10–25 | | | 45–75 | Report |
| 01 Jun | 17:00 | Federbrau (Thailand) | 3–0 | Chinese Taipei | 25–8 | 25–16 | 25–14 | | | 75–38 | Report |
| 02 Jun | 12:00 | SKIF (Uzbekistan) | 0–3 | (North Korea) Sobaeksu | 13–25 | 15–25 | 8–25 | | | 36–75 | Report |
| 02 Jun | 16:00 | Federbrau (Thailand) | 3–0 | (Iran) Saipa Tehran | 25–14 | 25–14 | 25–15 | | | 75–43 | Report |
| 03 Jun | 12:00 | Chinese Taipei | 3–1 | (Iran) Saipa Tehran | 25–20 | 21–25 | 25–17 | 25–20 | | 96–82 | Report |
| 03 Jun | 16:00 | SKIF (Uzbekistan) | 0–3 | (Thailand) Federbrau | 11–25 | 14–25 | 9–25 | | | 34–75 | Report |
| 04 Jun | 12:00 | Chinese Taipei | 3–0 | (Uzbekistan) SKIF | 25–12 | 25–11 | 25–17 | | | 75–40 | Report |
| 04 Jun | 16:00 | Sobaeksu (North Korea) | 0–3 | (Thailand) Federbrau | 11–25 | 20–25 | 15–25 | | | 46–75 | Report |
| 05 Jun | 14:00 | Saipa Tehran (Iran) | 3–0 | (Uzbekistan) SKIF | 25–20 | 25–21 | 25–18 | | | 75–59 | |
| 05 Jun | 16:00 | Sobaeksu (North Korea) | 3–1 | Chinese Taipei | 26–24 | 25–19 | 19–25 | 25–7 | | 95–75 | Report |

=== Pool B ===
| Pos | Team | Pld | W | L | Pts | SW | SL | SR | SPW | SPL | SPR | Qualification |
|---|---|---|---|---|---|---|---|---|---|---|---|---|
| 1 | (China) Tianjin Bridgestone | 5 | 5 | 0 | 10 | 15 | 2 | 7.500 | 417 | 269 | 1.550 | Final round |
| 2 | (Japan) Toray Arrows | 5 | 4 | 1 | 9 | 13 | 7 | 1.857 | 445 | 341 | 1.305 | Final round |
| 3 | (Kazakhstan) Zhetyssu Almaty | 5 | 3 | 2 | 8 | 12 | 6 | 2.000 | 420 | 299 | 1.405 | Final round |
| 4 | (Vietnam) Sport Center | 5 | 2 | 3 | 7 | 8 | 9 | 0.889 | 354 | 299 | 1.184 | Final round |
| 5 | (Indonesia) Petrokimia Gresik | 5 | 1 | 4 | 6 | 3 | 12 | 0.250 | 247 | 300 | 0.823 | |
| 6 | Afghanistan | 5 | 0 | 5 | 0 | 0 | 15 | 0.000 | 0 | 375 | 0.000 | |

| Date | Time | | Score | | Set 1 | Set 2 | Set 3 | Set 4 | Set 5 | Total | Report |
|---|---|---|---|---|---|---|---|---|---|---|---|
| 01 Jun | 10:00 | Tianjin Bridgestone (China) | 3–0 | Afghanistan | 25–0 | 25–0 | 25–0 | | | 75–0 | Forfeit |
| 01 Jun | 12:00 | Petrokimia Gresik (Indonesia) | 0–3 | (Kazakhstan) Zhetyssu Almaty | 19–25 | 12–25 | 16–25 | | | 47–75 | Report |
| 01 Jun | 19:00 | Sport Center (Vietnam) | 2–3 | (Japan) Toray Arrows | 25–21 | 25–20 | 21–25 | 18–25 | 9–15 | 98–106 | Report |
| 02 Jun | 10:00 | Afghanistan | 0–3 | (Kazakhstan) Zhetyssu Almaty | 0–25 | 0–25 | 0–25 | | | 0–75 | Forfeit |
| 02 Jun | 14:00 | Petrokimia Gresik (Indonesia) | 0–3 | (Vietnam) Sport Center | 19–25 | 9–25 | 15–25 | | | 43–75 | Report |
| 02 Jun | 18:00 | Tianjin Bridgestone (China) | 3–1 | (Japan) Toray Arrows | 25–17 | 21–25 | 25–19 | 25–21 | | 96–82 | Report |
| 03 Jun | 10:00 | Toray Arrows (Japan) | 3–0 | Afghanistan | 25–0 | 25–0 | 25–0 | | | 75–0 | Forfeit |
| 03 Jun | 14:00 | Zhetyssu Almaty (Kazakhstan) | 3–0 | (Vietnam) Sport Center | 25–19 | 25–20 | 25–10 | | | 75–49 | Report |
| 03 Jun | 18:00 | Tianjin Bridgestone (China) | 3–0 | (Indonesia) Petrokimia Gresik | 25–18 | 25–9 | 25–21 | | | 75–48 | Report |
| 04 Jun | 10:00 | Afghanistan | 0–3 | (Vietnam) Sport Center | 0–25 | 0–25 | 0–25 | | | 0–75 | Forfeit |
| 04 Jun | 14:00 | Toray Arrows (Japan) | 3–0 | (Indonesia) Petrokimia Gresik | 25–15 | 25–8 | 25–11 | | | 75–34 | Report |
| 04 Jun | 18:00 | Zhetyssu Almaty (Kazakhstan) | 1–3 | (China) Tianjin Bridgestone | 20–25 | 16–25 | 25–21 | 21–25 | | 82–96 | Report |
| 05 Jun | 10:00 | Petrokimia Gresik (Indonesia) | 3–0 | Afghanistan | 25–0 | 25–0 | 25–0 | | | 75–0 | Forfeit |
| 05 Jun | 12:00 | Sport Center (Vietnam) | 0–3 | (China) Tianjin Bridgestone | 11–25 | 23–25 | 23–25 | | | 57–75 | Report |
| 05 Jun | 18:00 | Toray Arrows (Japan) | 3–2 | (Kazakhstan) Zhetyssu Almaty | 19–25 | 26–24 | 25–22 | 18–25 | 19–17 | 107–113 | Report |

== Classification 9th–11th ==
9th–11th places
June 6 – Nakhon Pathom
(Indonesia) Petrokimia
Bye
June 6 – Nakhon Pathom
(Uzbekistan) SKIF | 3
Afghanistan | 0

9th place
June 7 – Nakhon Pathom
(Indonesia) Petrokimia | 2
(Uzbekistan) SKIF | 3

=== Semifinals ===
| Date | Time | | Score | | Set 1 | Set 2 | Set 3 | Set 4 | Set 5 | Total | Report |
|---|---|---|---|---|---|---|---|---|---|---|---|
| 06 Jun | 10:00 | SKIF (Uzbekistan) | 3–0 | Afghanistan | 25–0 | 25–0 | 25–0 | | | 75–0 | Forfeit |

=== 9th place ===
| Date | Time | | Score | | Set 1 | Set 2 | Set 3 | Set 4 | Set 5 | Total | Report |
|---|---|---|---|---|---|---|---|---|---|---|---|
| 07 Jun | 10:00 | Petrokimia Gresik (Indonesia) | 2–3 | (Uzbekistan) SKIF | 20–25 | 23–25 | 25–23 | 25–20 | 13–15 | 106–108 | Report |

== Final round ==
Quarterfinals
6 June – Nakhon Pathom
(Thailand) Federbrau | 3
(Vietnam) Sport Center | 0
6 June – Nakhon Pathom
(Japan) Toray Arrows | 3
Chinese Taipei | 0
6 June – Nakhon Pathom
(China) Tianjin | 3
(Iran) Saipa | 0
6 June – Nakhon Pathom
(North Korea) Sobaeksu | 0
(Kazakhstan) Zhetyssu | 3

Semifinals
7 June – Nakhon Pathom
(Thailand) Federbrau | 3
(Japan) Toray Arrows | 0
7 June – Nakhon Pathom
(China) Tianjin | 3
(Kazakhstan) Zhetyssu | 0

Final
8 June – Nakhon Pathom
(Thailand) Federbrau | 3
(China) Tianjin | 2
3rd place
8 June – Nakhon Pathom
(Japan) Toray Arrows | 3
(Kazakhstan) Zhetyssu | 2

5th–8th places
7 June – Nakhon Pathom
(Vietnam) Sport Center | 3
Chinese Taipei | 1
7 June – Nakhon Pathom
(Iran) Saipa | 0
(North Korea) Sobaeksu | 3

5th place
8 June – Nakhon Pathom
(Vietnam) Sport Center | 2
(North Korea) Sobaeksu | 3
7th place
8 June – Nakhon Pathom
Chinese Taipei | 3
(Iran) Saipa | 2

=== Quarterfinals ===
| Date | Time | | Score | | Set 1 | Set 2 | Set 3 | Set 4 | Set 5 | Total | Report |
|---|---|---|---|---|---|---|---|---|---|---|---|
| 06 Jun | 12:00 | Tianjin Bridgestone (China) | 3–0 | (Iran) Saipa Tehran | 25–13 | 25–18 | 25–10 | | | 75–41 | Report |
| 06 Jun | 14:00 | Sobaeksu (North Korea) | 0–3 | (Kazakhstan) Zhetyssu Almaty | 23–25 | 23–25 | 19–25 | | | 65–75 | Report |
| 06 Jun | 16:00 | Federbrau (Thailand) | 3–0 | (Vietnam) Sport Center | 25–17 | 25–19 | 25–22 | | | 75–58 | Report |
| 06 Jun | 18:00 | Toray Arrows (Japan) | 3–0 | Chinese Taipei | 25–18 | 25–22 | 26–24 | | | 76–64 | Report |

=== 5th–8th semifinals ===
| Date | Time | | Score | | Set 1 | Set 2 | Set 3 | Set 4 | Set 5 | Total | Report |
|---|---|---|---|---|---|---|---|---|---|---|---|
| 07 Jun | 12:00 | Sport Center (Vietnam) | 3–1 | Chinese Taipei | 25–18 | 25–20 | 15–25 | 25–21 | | 90–84 | Report |
| 07 Jun | 14:00 | Saipa Tehran (Iran) | 0–3 | (North Korea) Sobaeksu | 10–25 | 18–25 | 21–25 | | | 49–75 | Report |

=== Semifinals ===
| Date | Time | | Score | | Set 1 | Set 2 | Set 3 | Set 4 | Set 5 | Total | Report |
|---|---|---|---|---|---|---|---|---|---|---|---|
| 07 Jun | 16:00 | Federbrau (Thailand) | 3–0 | (Japan) Toray Arrows | 25–14 | 25–19 | 25–12 | | | 75–45 | Report |
| 07 Jun | 18:00 | Tianjin Bridgestone (China) | 3–0 | (Kazakhstan) Zhetyssu Almaty | 25–23 | 25–18 | 25–14 | | | 75–55 | Report |

=== 7th place ===
| Date | Time | | Score | | Set 1 | Set 2 | Set 3 | Set 4 | Set 5 | Total | Report |
|---|---|---|---|---|---|---|---|---|---|---|---|
| 08 Jun | 10:00 | Chinese Taipei | 3–2 | (Iran) Saipa Tehran | 25–22 | 25–18 | 21–25 | 20–25 | 15–13 | 106–103 | Report |

=== 5th place ===
| Date | Time | | Score | | Set 1 | Set 2 | Set 3 | Set 4 | Set 5 | Total | Report |
|---|---|---|---|---|---|---|---|---|---|---|---|
| 08 Jun | 12:00 | Sport Center (Vietnam) | 2–3 | (North Korea) Sobaeksu | 18–25 | 27–25 | 21–25 | 25–18 | 9–15 | 100–108 | Report |

=== 3rd place ===
| Date | Time | | Score | | Set 1 | Set 2 | Set 3 | Set 4 | Set 5 | Total | Report |
|---|---|---|---|---|---|---|---|---|---|---|---|
| 08 Jun | 14:00 | Toray Arrows (Japan) | 3–2 | (Kazakhstan) Zhetyssu Almaty | 25–22 | 22–25 | 14–25 | 25–18 | 15–9 | 101–99 | Report |

=== Final ===
| Date | Time | | Score | | Set 1 | Set 2 | Set 3 | Set 4 | Set 5 | Total | Report |
|---|---|---|---|---|---|---|---|---|---|---|---|
| 08 Jun | 16:00 | Federbrau (Thailand) | 3–2 | (China) Tianjin Bridgestone | 27–25 | 20–25 | 25–19 | 18–25 | 15–7 | 105–101 | Report |

== Final standing ==
| Rank | Team |
|---|---|
| 1st place, gold medalist(s) | (Thailand) Federbrau |
| 2nd place, silver medalist(s) | (China) Tianjin Bridgestone |
| 3rd place, bronze medalist(s) | (Japan) Toray Arrows |
| 4 | (Kazakhstan) Zhetyssu Almaty |
| 5 | (North Korea) Sobaeksu |
| 6 | (Vietnam) Sport Center |
| 7 | Chinese Taipei |
| 8 | (Iran) Saipa Tehran |
| 9 | (Uzbekistan) SKIF |
| 10 | (Indonesia) Petrokimia Gresik |
| 11 | Afghanistan |

== Awards ==
- MVP: (Thailand) Onuma Sittirak (Federbrau)
- Best scorer: (China) Chen Liyi (Tianjin)
- Best server: (Thailand) Nootsara Tomkom (Federbrau)
- Best spiker: (Thailand) Onuma Sittirak (Federbrau)
- Best blocker: (Kazakhstan) Olga Nassedkina (Zhetyssu)
- Best libero: (Thailand) Wanna Buakaew (Federbrau)
- Best setter: (China) Yu Jing (Tianjin)
