= Farhad Salafzoon =

Iranian volleyball player (born 1992)

Personal information
- Nationality: Iranian
- Born: 6 December 1992 (age 33); Kermanshah, Iran
- Height: 200 cm (6 ft 7 in)
- Weight: 91 kg (201 lb)
- Spike: 320 cm (126 in)
- Block: 313 cm (123 in)

Volleyball information
- Position: Setter
- Current club: (Iran) Shahrdari Urmia
- Number: 4

Career
Years	Teams
2007–2008; 2009–2010; 2011; 2012; 2013–2014; 2015–2016; 2017; 2018; 2019–	(Iran) Petrochimi Bandar Imam (Iran) Damash Gilan (Iran) Paykan Tehran (Iran) Matin Varamin (Iran) Aluminium Al-Mahdi (Iran) Paykan Tehran (Iran) Saipa Tehran (Greece) AEK (Iran) Shahrdari Urmia

National team
Iran
Honours
Representing Iran
Men's volleyball
World Grand Champions Cup
Bronze medal – third place	2017 Japan	Team
Asian Championship
Silver medal – second place	2015 Tehran	Team
Asian U20 Championship
Gold medal – first place	2008 Tehran	Team
World U19 Championship
Silver medal – second place	2009 Italy	Team
Gold medal – first place	2007 Mexico	Team
Asian U18 Championship
Gold medal – first place	2008 Sri Lanka	Team
Gold medal – first place	2007 Malaysia	Team
- Last updated: 13 March 20201

Farhad Salafzoon (Persian: فرهاد سال‌افزون; born 6 December 1992) is an Iranian male volleyball player. With his club Saipa he competed at the 2013 FIVB Volleyball Men's Club World Championship.

== Sporting achievements ==
=== National team ===
- 2017 World Grand Champions Cup
- 2015 Asian Men's Championship
- 2010 Asian U20 Championship
- 2009 World U19 Championship
- 2008 Asian U21 Championship
- 2008 Asian U18 Championship
- 2007 World U19 Championship
- 2007 Asian U19 Championship

=== Club ===
- 2015 Asian Men's Club Championship with Paykan Tehran

=== Individual ===
- 2008: Asian U20 Championship – Best Setter
- 2008: Asian U18 Championship – Most Valuable Player
