= Alireza Jadidi =

Iranian volleyball player (born 1989)

Personal information
- Full name: Alireza Jadidi
- Born: 11 February 1989 (age 37) Amol, Iran
- Height: 2.04 m (6 ft 8 in)
- Weight: 92 kg (203 lb)
- Spike: 360 cm (142 in)
- Block: 352 cm (139 in)

Volleyball information
- Position: Middle Blocker
- Current club: (Iran) Haraz Amol
- Number: 17

Career
- Years: Team
- 2004–2006 2007–2009 2006–2007 2011–2012 2012–2013 2013–2014 2014–2015 2017–2018 2018–2019 2021-2021: (Iran) Sanam Tehran (Iran) Petrochimi Bandar Imam VC (Iran) Damash Gilan (Iran) Kashan (Iran) Kalleh Mazandaran (Iran) Matin Varamin (Iran) SAIPA Tehran (Iran) Kalleh Mazandaran (Iran) SARAVIYE21 (Iran) Haraz Amol

National team
- Years: Team
- 2004–2008 2005–2021: Iran U19; Iran men's national volleyball team
Honours
Representing Iran
Men's volleyball
Gold medal – first place	2004–05 Iranian Volleyball Super League	Team
Gold medal – first place	2007 Asian Youth Boys Volleyball Championship	Team
Gold medal – first place	2007 FIVB Volleyball Boys' U19 World Championship	Team
Gold medal – first place	2008 Asian Junior Men's Volleyball Championship	Team
Silver medal – second place	2012 Asian Men's Volleyball Cup	Team

Alireza Jadidi (Persian: علیرضا جدیدی, born 11 February 1989) is an Iranian volleyball player. He made his first national team appearance in the 2005 FIVB Volleyball Boys' U19 World Championship, where Iran placed fifth. In 2007, he was invited to the national team by Jovica Cvetković which got first place in the 2007 Asian Youth Boys Volleyball Championship. His junior team won the 2007 FIVB Volleyball Boys' U19 World Championship in Mexico. He was on the Asian champion team at the 2008 Asian Junior Men's Volleyball Championship, where he was awarded best blocker at the tournament. At the 2009 FIVB Volleyball Men's U21 World Championship. Iran finished in seventh place in Pune, India with Jadidi contributing 12 points in their victory. Jadidi was the best blocker on the senior team at the 2012 Asian Men's Volleyball Cup. He was named the third best blocker among world clubs at the 2013 FIVB Volleyball Men's Club World Championship, in Brazil. He was chosen as best blocker in the Iranian Volleyball Super League in several seasons. He was a member of Iran men's national volleyball team.

== Career ==
=== Clubs in Iran ===
Jadidi started playing professional volleyball in 2004, playing for Sanam Tehran Sports Club. He went on to play for Matin Varamin VC, Saipa Tehran, Damash Gilan, and Kalleh Mazandaran. Jadidi's first championship experience in the Iranian Volleyball Super League was with Sanam Tehran. In the 2011 and 2012 seasons, he played for Kalleh Mazandaran.

=== National ===
In 2004, Jadidi was invited by Ivans Bugajenkovs to Iran's under 19 volleyball national team. Jadidi came fifth place with his team in the 2005 FIVB Volleyball Boys' U19 World Championship in his first national match. He was invited to the Iranian national volleyball team in 2007 by Jovica Cvetković, winning first place in the 2007 Asian Youth Boys Volleyball Championship in Malaysia. Jadidi also won first place at the 2007 FIVB Volleyball Boys' U19 World Championship again in Mexico. The championship was the first time the Iranian national volleyball team took part in a global competition.

In 2008, Jadidi won first place in the 2008 Asian Junior Men's Volleyball Championship in Tehran, Iran and was named the best blocker in Asia.

In 2008, Jadidi was invited to the senior Iran men's national volleyball team, for the first time, by Zoran Gajić.

In 2012, Jadidi got second place in the 2012 Asian Men's Club Volleyball Championship and he was named the best blocker among asian volleyball clubs.

He was in Iran men's national volleyball team when Julio Velasco was the coach of the team while playing in the world league. After playing for Velasco, Jadidi was again chosen for the national team by Slobodan Kovač.

In 2013, Jadidi was rewarded with a third middle blocker and sixth place serve ranking while playing in the Volleyball world club championship in Brazil. while playing for Kalleh Mazandaran team.

=== National team ===
  - Gold medal (1): 2007 FIVB Volleyball Boys' U19 World Championship
  - Gold medal (2): 2008 Asian Junior Men's Volleyball Championship
  - Gold medal (3): 2008 Asian Junior Men's Volleyball Championship
  - Silver medal (4): 2012 Asian Men's Volleyball Cup
  - Best Blocker (1): 2007 FIVB Volleyball Boys' U19 World Championship
  - Best Blocker (2): 2008 Asian Junior Men's Volleyball Championship
  - Best Blocker (3): 2012 Asian Men's Volleyball Cup

=== Clubs ===
- Iranian Volleyball Super League
  - Champions (1): 2004–05 Iranian Volleyball Super League Sanam Tehran Sports Club, 2011–12 Iranian Volleyball Super League Kalleh Mazandaran VC, 2013–14 Iranian Volleyball Super League Shahrdari Varamin VC
  - Bronze Medal (3): 2013 FIVB Volleyball Men's Club World Championship
