= Mojtaba Shaban =

Iranian volleyball player (born 1987)

Personal information
- Born: 18 March 1987 (age 39); Semnan, Iran
- Height: 1.92 m (6 ft 4 in)
- Weight: 86 kg (190 lb)
- Spike: 3.35 m (132 in)
- Block: 3.10 m (122 in)

Volleyball information
- Position: Wing-spiker
- Current club: Saipa
- Number: 2

Career
Years	Teams
2006–2007; 2007–2008; 2008–2011; 2011–2012; 2012–2015; 2015–	Paykan Tehran; Steel Azin Tehran; Paykan Tehran; Giti Pasand Isfahan; Paykan Tehran; Saipa

National team
2006–2007; 2008–2009	Iran U-19; Iran U-21

Mojtaba Shaban (Persian: مجتبی شبان, born 18 March 1987 in Semnan) is an Iranian professional volleyball player.

He was a member of the Iran national under-19 team that won the 2007 FIVB Boys' U19 Volleyball World Championship.

== Honours ==
=== National team ===
- Asian Junior Championship
  - Gold medal (1): 2008
- World Youth Championship
  - Gold medal (1): 2007
- Asian Youth Championship
  - Gold medal (1): 2007

=== Club ===
- Asian Championship
  - Gold medal (1): 2010 (Paykan)
- Iranian Super League
  - Champions (1): 2010 (Paykan)

=== Individual ===
- MVP:: 2007 Asian Youth Championship
