= Mahsa Arasteh =

Iranian Volleyball Coach

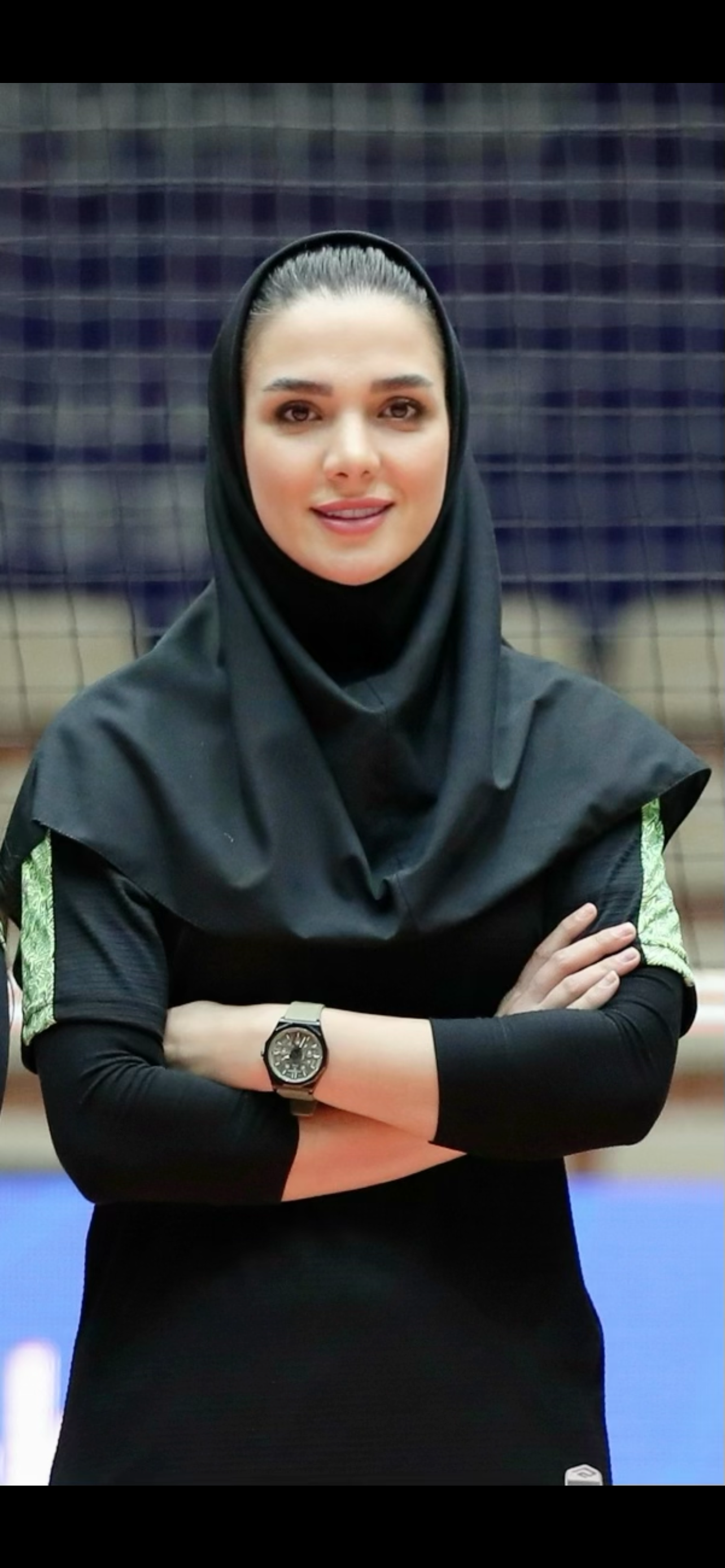
- Born: 1989/01/28; Iran, Qom
- Height: 178

Mahsa Arasteh (born January 28, 1989, in Qom, Iran) is an Iranian volleyball coach and former player. She currently serves as the head coach of the Iran Women’s National Volleyball Team and the Saipa Women's Volleyball Club. Arasteh has over 18 years of coaching experience, working with various teams at both club and national levels.

Arasteh began playing volleyball in 2004 and quickly progressed to the Qom Province Super League Team. She was invited to the Iran Women’s National Team for the first time in 2007 and continued to participate in training camps in subsequent years. After retiring as a player in 2015, she transitioned to full-time coaching, focusing on both youth and senior teams.

Her coaching career includes working with the Senior National Team, as well as U-16 and U-18 National Teams, where she has contributed to developing players across different age categories. At the club level, she has coached teams such as Saipa VC and Varamin VC, achieving several domestic league successes.

Arasteh holds a Ph.D. in Motor Behavior and is an International Level 2 Volleyball Coach certified by the Islamic Republic of Iran Volleyball Federation, where she also serves as an instructor.

== Achievements ==
Some of her most notable achievements as a coach include leading the Iranian national team to a silver medal at the Islamic Solidarity Games (2022) and participating in various international tournaments, including the Asian Women’s Volleyball Championship and the Asian Women’s Volleyball Challenge Cup.

== Coaching career ==
=== International level ===
- 2022: Coach of the Iran U16 National Team.
- 2021: Coach of the Immigrant Team Living in Iran, achieving first place in the Afghanistan National Team Qualification Tournament.
- 2021: Representative of the Iran Volleyball Federation in the Euro-Asia Project.
