= 2009–10 Iranian Volleyball Super League =

Iranian volleyball super league results for 2009/10

Locations of the 2009–10 season teams

The following is the final results of the Iranian Volleyball Super League (Unity Cup) 2009/10 season.

== Regular season ==
=== Standings ===
			Matches			Points ratio	Sets		
Rank	Team	Pts	Pld	W	L	Points ratio	W	L	Ratio
1	Paykan Tehran	54	28	26	2	1.156	81	21	3.857
2	Saipa Karaj	50	28	22	6	1.098	76	36	2.111
3	Damash Gilan	50	28	22	6	1.081	72	39	1.846
4	Kalleh Mazandaran	49	28	21	7	1.082	73	36	2.028
5	Petrochimi Bandar Imam	47	28	19	9	1.096	70	41	1.707
6	Javaheri Gonbad	43	28	15	13	1.013	59	57	1.035
7	Bargh Kerman	42	28	14	14	0.994	58	53	1.094
8	Bank Keshavarzi Tehran	40	28	12	16	1.005	52	60	0.867
9	Persepolis Tehran	39	28	11	17	0.956	48	59	0.814
10	Heyat Volleyball Khorasan Razavi	39	28	11	17	0.951	47	62	0.758
11	Azad University Tehran	37	28	9	19	0.925	38	65	0.585
12	Heyat Volleyball Urmia	37	28	9	19	0.904	34	69	0.493
13	Sang Ahan Bafgh	35	28	7	21	0.954	38	70	0.543
14	Erteashat Sanati Tehran	35	28	7	21	0.902	35	75	0.467
15	Gol Gohar Sirjan	33	28	5	23	0.915	38	76	0.500

=== Results ===
	AZD	KES	BRG	DAM	ERT	GOL	HVK	HVU	JAV	KAL	PAY	PRS	PET	SAI	SNG
Azad University		1–3	0–3	3–0	2–3	3–0	3–1	3–0	3–2	0–3	1–3	1–3	0–3	0–3	3–1
Bank Keshavarzi	3–1		0–3	1–3	2–3	2–3	3–1	3–1	2–3	2–3	0–3	3–1	3–2	0–3	3–0
Bargh Kerman	3–0	1–3		1–3	3–0	3–0	2–3	3–0	3–2	3–1	2–3	3–1	2–3	2–3	3–1
Damash	3–1	3–1	3–0		3–0	3–0	3–1	3–1	3–1	2–3	3–2	3–1	3–1	3–2	3–1
Erteashat Sanati	2–3	1–3	3–0	2–3		3–2	1–3	1–3	3–2	0–3	0–3	3–2	0–3	0–3	3–2
Gol Gohar	1–3	3–1	2–3	2–3	3–2		1–3	3–0	0–3	1–3	1–3	2–3	0–3	2–3	3–2
HV Khorasan Razavi	1–3	3–2	2–3	0–3	3–1	3–1		3–0	0–3	0–3	0–3	3–0	3–1	3–1	3–1
HV Urmia	3–1	3–1	1–3	1–3	3–2	3–1	3–2		3–2	1–3	0–3	1–3	1–3	3–2	0–3
Javaheri Gonbad	3–1	0–3	3–2	1–3	3–0	3–1	3–2	3–0		3–2	0–3	3–1	3–2	1–3	3–1
Kalleh	3–1	3–0	3–0	3–1	3–1	3–1	3–0	3–0	3–1		2–3	3–0	2–3	1–3	3–0
Paykan	3–0	3–0	3–1	3–1	3–0	3–1	3–0	3–0	3–0	1–3		3–0	3–0	3–2	3–0
Persepolis	3–0	2–3	1–3	0–3	3–0	3–1	3–1	3–0	3–1	1–3	0–3		2–3	0–3	3–0
Petrochimi	3–0	3–2	3–0	1–3	3–0	3–0	3–1	3–0	2–3	3–0	2–3	3–2		3–1	3–1
Saipa	3–1	3–0	3–1	3–1	3–1	3–1	3–0	3–0	3–1	3–2	2–3	3–1	3–2		3–1
Sang Ahan	3–0	1–3	3–2	3–1	3–0	3–2	3–2	0–3	2–3	2–3	0–3	1–3	0–3	0–3	

== Playoffs ==
=== Bottom 7 ===
Classification 9th–15th
9	Persepolis	—	—	—
–	Bye	—	—	—
12	HV Urmia	1	1	—
13	Sang Ahan	3	3	—
10	HV Khorasan Razavi	3	3	—
15	Gol Gohar	1	1	—
11	Azad University	1	2	—
14	Erteashat Sanati	3	3	—

Classification 9th–12th
9	Persepolis	3	3	—
13	Sang Ahan	0	0	—
10	HV Khorasan Razavi	3	2	0
14	Erteashat Sanati	2	3	3

9th place
9	Persepolis	3	1	3
14	Erteashat Sanati	1	3	1
11th place (Canceled)
13	Sang Ahan	—	—	—
10	HV Khorasan Razavi	—	—	—

Classification 13th–15th
–	Bye	—	—	—
12	HV Urmia	—	—	—
15	Gol Gohar	3	3	—
11	Azad University	2	0	—

13th place
12	HV Urmia	3	3	—
15	Gol Gohar	0	1	—

=== Top 8 ===
Quarterfinals
1	Paykan	3	3	—
8	Bank Keshavarzi	1	0	—
4	Kalleh	3	3	—
5	Petrochimi	1	1	—
2	Saipa	3	3	—
7	Bargh Kerman	0	0	—
3	Damash	3	2	3
6	Javaheri Gonbad	0	3	1

Semifinals
1	Paykan	3	3	—
4	Kalleh	1	2	—
2	Saipa	3	3	—
3	Damash	0	2	—

Final
1	Paykan	3	3	—
2	Saipa	2	1	—
3rd place
4	Kalleh	2	3	3
3	Damash	3	0	0

5th–8th places
8	Bank Keshavarzi	3	3	—
5	Petrochimi	2	0	—
7	Bargh Kerman	1	3	1
6	Javaheri Gonbad	3	1	3

5th place
8	Bank Keshavarzi	2	3	2
6	Javaheri Gonbad	3	1	3
7th place
5	Petrochimi	3	—	—
7	Bargh Kerman	1	—	—

==== Quarterfinals ====
Paykan vs. Bank Keshavarzi

Date		Score		Set 1	Set 2	Set 3	Set 4	Set 5	Total
18 Apr	Paykan Tehran	3–1	Bank Keshavarzi Tehran	25–23	23–25	25–22	25–16		98–86
21 Apr	Bank Keshavarzi Tehran	0–3	Paykan Tehran	15–25	21–25	19–25			55–75

Kalleh vs. Petrochimi

Date		Score		Set 1	Set 2	Set 3	Set 4	Set 5	Total
18 Apr	Kalleh Mazandaran	3–1	Petrochimi Bandar Imam	23–25	33–31	25–18	25–17		106–91
21 Apr	Petrochimi Bandar Imam	1–3	Kalleh Mazandaran	25–15	21–25	18–25	21–25		85–90

Saipa vs. Bargh Kerman

Date		Score		Set 1	Set 2	Set 3	Set 4	Set 5	Total
18 Apr	Saipa Karaj	3–0	Bargh Kerman	28–26	25–20	25–13			78–59
21 Apr	Bargh Kerman	0–3	Saipa Karaj	18–25	18–25	22–25			58–75

Damash vs. Javaheri Gonbad

Date		Score		Set 1	Set 2	Set 3	Set 4	Set 5	Total
18 Apr	Damash Gilan	3–0	Javaheri Gonbad	26–24	25–20	25–23			76–67
21 Apr	Javaheri Gonbad	3–2	Damash Gilan	25–22	25–21	23–25	17–25	15–11	105–104
25 Apr	Damash Gilan	3–1	Javaheri Gonbad	25–23	25–17	28–30	25–19		103–89

==== Semifinals ====
Paykan vs. Kalleh

Date		Score		Set 1	Set 2	Set 3	Set 4	Set 5	Total
28 Apr	Paykan Tehran	3–1	Kalleh Mazandaran	25–22	25–22	20–25	25–23		95–92
02 May	Kalleh Mazandaran	2–3	Paykan Tehran	12–25	25–23	25–18	22–25	15–17	99–108

Saipa vs. Damash

Date		Score		Set 1	Set 2	Set 3	Set 4	Set 5	Total
28 Apr	Saipa Karaj	3–0	Damash Gilan	25–18	25–20	25–20			75–58
02 May	Damash Gilan	2–3	Saipa Karaj	21–25	25–19	20–25	31–29	10–15	108–113

==== 3rd place ====
Damash vs. Kalleh

Date		Score		Set 1	Set 2	Set 3	Set 4	Set 5	Total
09 May	Damash Gilan	3–2	Kalleh Mazandaran	25–21	25–21	18–25	20–25	15–12	103–104
12 May	Kalleh Mazandaran	3–0	Damash Gilan	25–23	25–18	25–16			75–57
19 May	Damash Gilan	0–3	Kalleh Mazandaran	20–25	23–25	17–25			60–75

==== Final ====
Paykan vs. Saipa

Date		Score		Set 1	Set 2	Set 3	Set 4	Set 5	Total
09 May	Paykan Tehran	3–2	Saipa Karaj	25–22	25–22	19–25	23–25	15–10	107–104
13 May	Saipa Karaj	1–3	Paykan Tehran	23–25	25–16	20–25	25–27		93–93

== Final standings ==
Rank	Team	Qualification or relegation
1	Paykan Tehran	2010 Asian Club Championship
2	Saipa Karaj	
3	Kalleh Mazandaran	
4	Damash Gilan	
5	Javaheri Gonbad	
6	Bank Keshavarzi Tehran	
7	Petrochimi Bandar Imam	
8	Bargh Kerman	
9	Persepolis Tehran	
10	Erteashat Sanati Tehran	
11	Heyat Volleyball Khorasan Razavi	
12	Sang Ahan Bafgh	
13	Heyat Volleyball Urmia	Relegation playoff
14	Gol Gohar Sirjan	Relegation to the first division
15	Azad University Tehran	Relegation to the first division
