= 2010–11 Iranian Volleyball Super League =

Locations of the 2010–11 season teams

The following is the results of the Iranian Volleyball Super League 2010/11 season.

== Regular season ==
=== Pool A ===
			Matches			Points ratio	Sets		
Rank	Team	Pts	Pld	W	L	Points ratio	W	L	Ratio
1	Saipa Alborz	25	14	11	3	1.112	37	19	1.947
2	Barij Essence Kashan	24	14	10	4	1.054	33	24	1.375
3	Damash Gilan	22	14	8	6	1.059	32	22	1.455
4	Heyat Volleyball Kerman	22	14	8	6	1.018	30	25	1.200
5	Pishgaman Kavir Yazd	20	14	6	8	0.974	26	29	0.897
6	Bank Keshavarzi Tehran	20	14	6	8	0.967	24	32	0.750
7	Azad University Tehran	19	14	5	9	0.955	22	31	0.710
8	Erteashat Sanati Tehran	16	14	2	12	0.877	16	38	0.421

	AZD	KES	BRJ	DAM	ERT	HVK	PSH	SAI
Azad University		3–0	2–3	3–1	0–3	1–3	3–2	0–3
Bank Keshavarzi	3–1		3–2	3–2	3–1	0–3	3–1	0–3
Barij Essence	3–1	3–0		3–1	3–2	3–0	3–1	2–3
Damash	3–0	3–0	3–0		3–0	3–1	1–3	3–1
Erteashat Sanati	1–3	2–3	0–3	1–3		3–2	0–3	1–3
HV Kerman	3–1	2–3	3–1	1–3	3–2		3–1	3–1
Pishgaman Kavir	0–3	3–2	3–1	3–1	3–0	0–3		2–3
Saipa	3–1	3–1	2–3	3–2	3–0	3–0	3–1	

=== Pool B ===
			Matches			Points ratio	Sets		
Rank	Team	Pts	Pld	W	L	Points ratio	W	L	Ratio
1	Paykan Tehran	26	14	12	2	1.115	36	13	2.769
2	Kalleh Mazandaran	24	14	10	4	1.021	35	20	1.750
3	Aboumoslem Khorasan	22	14	8	6	0.999	27	25	1.080
4	Heyat Volleyball Urmia	21	14	7	7	1.037	28	25	1.120
5	Persepolis Tehran	21	14	7	7	1.036	31	31	1.000
6	Aluminium Al-Mahdi Hormozgan	19	14	5	9	0.940	19	35	0.543
7	Petrochimi Bandar Imam	19	14	5	9	0.921	22	32	0.688
8	Javaheri Gonbad	16	14	2	12	0.947	20	37	0.541

	ABU	ALU	HVU	JAV	KAL	PAY	PRS	PET
Aboumoslem		3–1	3–0	3–1	3–1	0–3	3–2	3–0
Aluminium	0–3		3–1	1–3	0–3	0–3	3–2	3–2
HV Urmia	3–0	3–0		3–2	3–2	3–0	1–3	3–0
Javaheri Gonbad	2–3	2–3	0–3		2–3	1–3	2–3	1–3
Kalleh	3–0	3–0	3–1	3–1		1–3	3–1	3–1
Paykan	3–1	3–0	3–1	3–0	3–1		3–1	3–0
Persepolis	3–1	3–2	3–2	3–0	1–3	1–3		2–3
Petrochimi	3–1	1–3	3–1	0–3	1–3	3–0	2–3	

== Playoffs ==
=== Relegation round ===
Relegation
A5	Azad University	3	2	2
B6	Javaheri Gonbad	1	3	3

Relegation
B5	Petrochimi	3	3	—
A5	Erteashat Sanati	1	0	—

=== Classification 9th–12th ===
9th–10th
A5	Pishgaman Kavir	3	1	4
B5	Persepolis	0	3	3

11th–12th
A6	Bank Keshavarzi	2	1	3
B6	Aluminium	3	3	6

=== Top 8 ===
Quarterfinals
A1	Saipa	3	3	—
B4	HV Urmia	0	1	—
B2	Kalleh	3	3	—
A3	Damash	0	1	—
B1	Paykan	3	3	—
A4	HV Kerman	1	1	—
A2	Barij Essence	3	2	3
B3	Aboumoslem	1	3	0

Semifinals
A1	Saipa	3	0	3
B2	Kalleh	1	3	1
B1	Paykan	3	2	3
A2	Barij Essence	2	3	0

Final
A1	Saipa	2	1	—
B1	Paykan	3	3	—
3rd place
B2	Kalleh	0	3	3
A2	Barij Essence	3	0	1

5th–8th places
B4	HV Urmia	3	1	WD
A3	Damash	2	3
A4	HV Kerman	3	—
B3	Aboumoslem	1	WD	—

5th place
A3	Damash	3	—	—
A4	HV Kerman	0	—	—
7th place
B4	HV Urmia	—	—
B3	Aboumoslem	WD	—	—

==== Quarterfinals ====
Saipa vs. HV Urmia

Date		Score		Set 1	Set 2	Set 3	Set 4	Set 5	Total
06 Apr	Saipa Alborz	3–0	Heyat Volleyball Urmia	26–24	25–21	25–19			76–64
10 Apr	Heyat Volleyball Urmia	1–3	Saipa Alborz	22–25	23–25	25–19	18–25		88–94

Kalleh vs. Damash

Date		Score		Set 1	Set 2	Set 3	Set 4	Set 5	Total
06 Apr	Kalleh Mazandaran	3–0	Damash Gilan	25–22	25–22	25–22			75–66
10 Apr	Damash Gilan	1–3	Kalleh Mazandaran	27–29	15–25	25–23	22–25		89–102

Paykan vs. HV Kerman

Date		Score		Set 1	Set 2	Set 3	Set 4	Set 5	Total
06 Apr	Paykan Tehran	3–1	Heyat Volleyball Kerman	25–20	23–25	25–20	25–19		98–84
10 Apr	Heyat Volleyball Kerman	1–3	Paykan Tehran	18–25	17–25	25–21	21–25		81–96

Barij Essence vs. Aboumoslem

Date		Score		Set 1	Set 2	Set 3	Set 4	Set 5	Total
06 Apr	Barij Essence Kashan	3–1	Aboumoslem Khorasan	25–23	25–15	22–25	25–13		97–76
10 Apr	Aboumoslem Khorasan	3–2	Barij Essence Kashan	25–23	24–26	25–22	29–31	15–12	118–114
13 Apr	Barij Essence Kashan	3–0	Aboumoslem Khorasan	25–21	25–23	25–19			75–63

==== Semifinals ====
Saipa vs. Kalleh

Date		Score		Set 1	Set 2	Set 3	Set 4	Set 5	Total
20 Apr	Saipa Alborz	3–1	Kalleh Mazandaran	25–19	25–19	22–25	25–18		97–81
24 Apr	Kalleh Mazandaran	3–0	Saipa Alborz	25–21	25–19	25–23			75–63
27 Apr	Saipa Alborz	3–1	Kalleh Mazandaran	30–28	25–22	24–26	25–22		104–98

Paykan vs. Barij Essence

Date		Score		Set 1	Set 2	Set 3	Set 4	Set 5	Total
20 Apr	Paykan Tehran	3–2	Barij Essence Kashan	25–15	18–25	27–29	25–19	16–14	111–102
24 Apr	Barij Essence Kashan	3–2	Paykan Tehran	22–25	25–21	25–18	20–25	15–12	107–101
27 Apr	Paykan Tehran	3–0	Barij Essence Kashan	25–14	25–23	25–21			75–58

==== 3rd place ====
Kalleh vs. Barij Essence

Date		Score		Set 1	Set 2	Set 3	Set 4	Set 5	Total
04 May	Barij Essence Kashan	3–0	Kalleh Mazandaran	25–17	25–21	25–22			75–60
11 May	Kalleh Mazandaran	3–0	Barij Essence Kashan	25–19	25–23	25–22			75–64
18 May	Barij Essence Kashan	1–3	Kalleh Mazandaran	25–22	20–25	22–25	18–25		85–97

==== Final ====
Saipa vs. Paykan

Date		Score		Set 1	Set 2	Set 3	Set 4	Set 5	Total
04 May	Saipa Alborz	2–3	Paykan Tehran	21–25	25–20	23–25	25–18	17–19	111–107
11 May	Paykan Tehran	3–1	Saipa Alborz	25–19	16–25	25–18	25–23		91–85

== Final standings ==
Rank	Team	Qualification or relegation
1	Paykan Tehran	2011 Asian Club Championship
2	Saipa Alborz	
3	Kalleh Mazandaran	
4	Barij Essence Kashan	
5	Damash Gilan	
6	Heyat Volleyball Kerman	
7	Heyat Volleyball Urmia	
8	Aboumoslem Khorasan	
9	Pishgaman Kavir Yazd	
10	Persepolis Tehran	
11	Aluminium Al-Mahdi Hormozgan	
12	Bank Keshavarzi Tehran	
13	Petrochimi Bandar Imam	
13	Javaheri Gonbad	
15	Azad University Tehran	Relegation to the first division
15	Erteashat Sanati Tehran	Relegation to the first division
