= 2007 Asian Youth Boys' Volleyball Championship =

Tournament details
- Host country: Malaysia
- Dates: 19–27 May
- Teams: 11
- Venue: 1 (in 1 host city)

Final positions
- Champions: Iran (3rd title)

Tournament awards
- MVP: (Iran) Mojtaba Shaban

The 2007 Asian Youth Boys' Volleyball Championship was held at the Stadium Badminton, Kuala Lumpur, Malaysia from 19 to 27 May 2007.

== Pools composition ==
The teams were seeded based on their final ranking at the 2005 Asian Youth Boys Volleyball Championship.

Pool A	Pool B
Malaysia (Host); India (3rd); Hong Kong; Japan; Australia	Iran (1st); South Korea (2nd); Chinese Taipei; China; Thailand; Sri Lanka

== Preliminary round ==
=== Pool A ===
Pos	Team	Pld	W	L	Pts	SW	SL	SR	SPW	SPL	SPR	Qualification
1	India	4	3	1	7	10	3	3.333	319	241	1.324	Quarterfinals
2	Japan	4	3	1	7	9	4	2.250	310	258	1.202	Quarterfinals
3	Australia	4	3	1	7	10	4	2.500	328	277	1.184	Quarterfinals
4	Malaysia	4	1	3	5	3	9	0.333	224	285	0.786	Quarterfinals
5	Hong Kong	4	0	4	4	0	12	0.000	181	301	0.601	

Date	Time		Score		Set 1	Set 2	Set 3	Set 4	Set 5	Total
19 May	12:00	Malaysia	3–0	Hong Kong	25–15	26–24	25–21			76–60
19 May	18:00	India	1–3	Australia	25–22	23–25	23–25	20–25		91–97
20 May	14:00	Japan	0–3	India	26–28	19–25	23–25			68–78
20 May	18:00	Australia	3–0	Malaysia	25–22	25–13	25–16			75–51
21 May	14:00	Hong Kong	0–3	Australia	16–25	11–25	16–25			43–75
21 May	20:00	Malaysia	0–3	Japan	19–25	12–25	21–25			52–75
22 May	16:00	Japan	3–0	Hong Kong	25–17	25–18	25–12			75–47
22 May	20:00	India	3–0	Malaysia	25–16	25–22	25–16			75–45
23 May	12:00	Australia	1–3	Japan	25–17	16–25	17–25	23–25		81–92
23 May	18:00	Hong Kong	0–3	India	12–25	10–25	9–25			31–75

=== Pool B ===
Pos	Team	Pld	W	L	Pts	SW	SL	SR	SPW	SPL	SPR	Qualification
1	South Korea	5	5	0	10	15	5	3.000	473	373	1.268	Quarterfinals
2	China	5	4	1	9	14	3	4.667	395	319	1.238	Quarterfinals
3	Iran	5	3	2	8	10	6	1.667	388	350	1.109	Quarterfinals
4	Chinese Taipei	5	2	3	7	6	9	0.667	355	356	0.997	Quarterfinals
5	Thailand	5	1	4	6	4	12	0.333	315	378	0.833	
6	Sri Lanka	5	0	5	5	1	15	0.067	249	399	0.624	

Date	Time		Score		Set 1	Set 2	Set 3	Set 4	Set 5	Total
19 May	14:00	Thailand	3–0	Sri Lanka	25–18	25–16	25–20			75–54
19 May	16:00	South Korea	3–0	Chinese Taipei	25–18	26–24	25–21			76–63
19 May	20:00	China	3–0	Iran	25–22	25–20	25–21			75–63
20 May	12:00	Chinese Taipei	3–0	Thailand	25–18	30–28	25–22			80–68
20 May	16:00	Iran	3–0	Sri Lanka	25–13	25–13	25–19			75–45
20 May	20:00	China	2–3	South Korea	18–25	25–17	26–24	20–25	6–15	95–106
21 May	12:00	Sri Lanka	0–3	Chinese Taipei	12–25	18–25	21–25			51–75
21 May	16:00	Thailand	0–3	China	18–25	17–25	16–25			51–75
21 May	18:00	South Korea	3–1	Iran	23–25	25–20	25–22	25–22		98–89
22 May	12:00	China	3–0	Sri Lanka	25–18	25–7	25–14			75–39
22 May	14:00	South Korea	3–1	Thailand	19–25	25–14	25–15	25–12		94–66
22 May	18:00	Iran	3–0	Chinese Taipei	27–25	34–32	25–20			86–77
23 May	14:00	Sri Lanka	1–3	South Korea	12–25	9–25	26–24	13–25		60–99
23 May	16:00	Chinese Taipei	0–3	China	19–25	23–25	18–25			60–75
23 May	20:00	Thailand	0–3	Iran	14–25	21–25	20–25			55–75

== Classification 9th–11th ==
9th–11th places
25 May – Kuala Lumpur
Hong Kong	0
Sri Lanka	3
25 May – Kuala Lumpur
Thailand
Bye

9th place
26 May – Kuala Lumpur
Sri Lanka	0
Thailand	3

=== Semifinals ===
Date	Time		Score		Set 1	Set 2	Set 3	Set 4	Set 5	Total
25 May	12:00	Hong Kong	0–3	Sri Lanka	33–35	20–25	18–25			71–85

=== 11th place ===
Date	Time		Score		Set 1	Set 2	Set 3	Set 4	Set 5	Total
26 May	12:00	Sri Lanka	0–3	Thailand	20–25	19–25	11–25			50–75

== Final round ==
Quarterfinals
25 May – Kuala Lumpur
India	3
Chinese Taipei	1
25 May – Kuala Lumpur
China	3
Australia	0
25 May – Kuala Lumpur
South Korea	3
Malaysia	0
25 May – Kuala Lumpur
Japan	0
Iran	3

Semifinals
26 May – Kuala Lumpur
India	3
China	2
26 May – Kuala Lumpur
South Korea	1
Iran	3

Final
27 May – Kuala Lumpur
India	0
Iran	3
3rd place
27 May – Kuala Lumpur
China	3
South Korea	2

5th–8th places
26 May – Kuala Lumpur
Chinese Taipei	3
Australia	0
26 May – Kuala Lumpur
Malaysia	0
Japan	3

5th place
27 May – Kuala Lumpur
Chinese Taipei	1
Japan	3
7th place
27 May – Kuala Lumpur
Australia	3
Malaysia	0

=== Quarterfinals ===
Date	Time		Score		Set 1	Set 2	Set 3	Set 4	Set 5	Total
25 May	14:00	India	3–1	Chinese Taipei	25–21	22–25	25–16	25–19		97–81
25 May	16:00	South Korea	3–0	Malaysia	25–20	25–13	25–14			75–47
25 May	18:00	Japan	0–3	Iran	19–25	22–25	30–32			71–82
25 May	20:00	China	3–0	Australia	25–18	25–20	25–19			75–57

=== 5th–8th semifinals ===
Date	Time		Score		Set 1	Set 2	Set 3	Set 4	Set 5	Total
26 May	14:00	Chinese Taipei	3–0	Australia	27–25	25–16	29–27			81–68
26 May	16:00	Malaysia	0–3	Japan	21–25	20–25	16–25			57–75

=== Semifinals ===
Date	Time		Score		Set 1	Set 2	Set 3	Set 4	Set 5	Total
26 May	18:00	India	3–2	China	25–21	21–25	25–20	20–25	15–13	106–104
26 May	20:00	South Korea	1–3	Iran	19–25	25–20	20–25	22–25		86–95

=== 7th place ===
Date	Time		Score		Set 1	Set 2	Set 3	Set 4	Set 5	Total
27 May	11:00	Australia	3–0	Malaysia	25–22	25–13	25–16			75–51

=== 5th place ===
Date	Time		Score		Set 1	Set 2	Set 3	Set 4	Set 5	Total
27 May	13:00	Chinese Taipei	1–3	Japan	25–23	26–28	26–28	23–25		100–104

=== 3rd place ===
Date	Time		Score		Set 1	Set 2	Set 3	Set 4	Set 5	Total
27 May	15:00	China	3–2	South Korea	25–18	17–25	24–26	25–20	15–6	106–95

=== Final ===
Date	Time		Score		Set 1	Set 2	Set 3	Set 4	Set 5	Total
27 May	17:00	India	0–3	Iran	16–25	22–25	11–25			49–75

== Final standing ==
Rank	Team
1st place, gold medalist(s)	Iran
2nd place, silver medalist(s)	India
3rd place, bronze medalist(s)	China
4	South Korea
5	Japan
6	Chinese Taipei
7	Australia
8	Malaysia
9	Thailand
10	Sri Lanka
11	Hong Kong

Qualified for the 2007 FIVB Youth World Championship

2007 Asian Youth Boys champions

Iran
Third title

Team Roster
Mojtaba Shaban, Moein Rahimi, Hamed Bagherpour, Ashkan Derakhshan, Farhad Salafzoun, Edris Daneshfar, Farhad Ghaemi, Ebrahim Chabokian, Arash Kamalvand, Amin Razavi, Golmohammad Sakhavi, Alireza Jadidi
Head Coach: Jovica Cvetković

== Awards ==
- MVP: (Iran) Mojtaba Shaban
- Best scorer: (Iran) Mojtaba Shaban
- Best spiker: (China) Chen Ping
- Best blocker: (Australia) Aidan Zingel
- Best server: (China) Chen Ping
- Best setter: (Chinese Taipei) Cheng Li-sheng
- Best digger: (Japan) Shogo Hayase
- Best receiver: (Chinese Taipei) Chien Wei-lun
