= Jadidi =

Jadidi is a surname. Notable people with the surname include:

- Abbas Jadidi (born 1969), Iranian wrestler
- Alireza Jadidi (born 1989), Iranian volleyball player
- Amir Jadidi (born 1984), Iranian actor and tennis player
