= Farhad Nazari Afshar =

Iranian volleyball player

Personal information
- Full name: Farhad Nazari Afshar
- Born: May 22, 1984 (age 42); Tehran, Iran
- Height: 1.95 m (6 ft 5 in)
- Weight: 82 kg (181 lb)
- Spike: 3.45 m (136 in)
- Block: 3.31 m (130 in)

Volleyball information
- Position: Outside hitter
- Current club: (Iran) Sarmayeh Bank Tehran
- Number: 12

Career
Years	Teams
2003–2005; 2005–2010; 2010–2012; 2012–2014; 2014–2015; 2015–2016	(Iran) Etka (Iran) Saipa (Iran) Kalleh (Iran) Matin (Iran) Shahrdari Urmia (Iran) Sarmayeh

National team
2008–2017	Iran
Honours
Representing Iran
Men's volleyball
World Grand Champions Cup
Bronze medal – third place	2017 Japan	Team
Asian Championship
Gold medal – first place	2011 Tehran	Team
Silver medal – second place	2009 Manila	Team
Asian Games
Silver medal – second place	2010 Guangzhou	Team
AVC Cup
Gold medal – first place	2008 Nakhon Ratchasima	Team
Gold medal – first place	2010 Urmia	Team

Farhad Nazari Afshar (Persian: فرهاد نظری افشار, born 22 May 1984 in Tehran) is an Iranian volleyball player, who former plays as an outside hitter for the Men's National Team of the year 2009–2017. Nazari Afshar announced his retirement on Sunday in Osaka after 2017 FIVB Volleyball Men's World Grand Champions Cup.

== Honours ==
=== National team ===
- World Grand Champions Cup
  - Bronze medal (1): 2017
- Asian Championship
  - Gold medal (1): 2011
  - Silver medal (1): 2009
- Asian Games
  - Silver medal (1): 2010
- AVC Cup
  - Gold medal (2): 2008, 2010

=== Club ===
- Iranian Super League
  - Champions (3): 2012 (Kalleh), 2014 (Matin), 2016 (Sarmayeh)

=== Individual ===
- Best scorer: 2009 Asian Club Championship
- Most valuable player: 2010 AVC Cup
