= 2008 Asian Junior Men's Volleyball Championship =

2008 Asian Junior Men's Championship

Tournament details
- Host country: Iran
- Dates: 23–31 August
- Teams: 13
- Venues: 2 (in 1 host city)

Final positions
- Champions: Iran (4th title)

Tournament awards
- MVP: (Iran) Mojtaba Ghiasi

The 2008 Asian Junior Men's Volleyball Championship was held in Azadi Sport Complex, Tehran, Iran from 23 August to 31 August 2008.

== Pools composition ==
The teams are seeded based on their final ranking at the 2006 Asian Junior Men's Volleyball Championship.

Pool A	Pool B	Pool C	Pool D
Iran (Host & 1st); Qatar (8th); Maldives	Japan (2nd); Australia (7th); Kazakhstan; ~~United Arab Emirates~~ *	India (3rd); South Korea (6th); Sri Lanka; Indonesia	Chinese Taipei (4th); China (5th); Pakistan; ~~Kyrgyzstan~~ *

* Kyrgyzstan withdrew after Iran Aseman Airlines Flight 6895 crashed en route to the tournament, killing 10 of 17 players.

== Preliminary round ==
=== Pool A ===
Pos	Team	Pld	W	L	Pts	SW	SL	SR	SPW	SPL	SPR	Qualification
1	Iran	2	2	0	4	6	0	MAX	150	66	2.273	Pool E
2	Qatar	2	1	1	3	3	3	1.000	116	117	0.991	Pool E
3	Maldives	2	0	2	2	0	6	0.000	67	150	0.447	Pool G

Date	Time		Score		Set 1	Set 2	Set 3	Set 4	Set 5	Total
23 Aug	17:30	Iran	3–0	Maldives	25–10	25–6	25–9			75–25
24 Aug	17:00	Qatar	3–0	Maldives	25–14	25–13	25–15			75–42
25 Aug	17:00	Iran	3–0	Qatar	25–13	25–13	25–15			75–41

=== Pool B ===
Pos	Team	Pld	W	L	Pts	SW	SL	SR	SPW	SPL	SPR	Qualification
1	Australia	2	2	0	4	6	1	6.000	173	145	1.193	Pool F
2	Japan	2	1	1	3	3	4	0.750	158	150	1.053	Pool F
3	Kazakhstan	2	0	2	2	2	6	0.333	158	194	0.814	Pool H

Date	Time		Score		Set 1	Set 2	Set 3	Set 4	Set 5	Total
23 Aug	17:30	Australia	3–1	Kazakhstan	25–19	23–25	25–19	25–20		98–83
24 Aug	17:00	Australia	3–0	Japan	25–17	25–23	25–22			75–62
25 Aug	15:00	Japan	3–1	Kazakhstan	25–19	25–18	21–25	25–13		96–75

=== Pool C ===
Pos	Team	Pld	W	L	Pts	SW	SL	SR	SPW	SPL	SPR	Qualification
1	India	3	3	0	6	9	1	9.000	250	196	1.276	Pool E
2	South Korea	3	2	1	5	7	3	2.333	238	198	1.202	Pool E
3	Indonesia	3	1	2	4	3	8	0.375	236	261	0.904	Pool G
4	Sri Lanka	3	0	3	3	2	9	0.222	200	269	0.743	Pool G

Date	Time		Score		Set 1	Set 2	Set 3	Set 4	Set 5	Total
23 Aug	14:00	Indonesia	3–2	Sri Lanka	25–16	31–33	23–25	25–23	15–12	119–109
23 Aug	19:30	South Korea	1–3	India	20–25	25–23	22–25	21–25		88–98
24 Aug	11:00	South Korea	3–0	Indonesia	25–19	25–20	25–14			75–53
24 Aug	15:00	India	3–0	Sri Lanka	25–15	25–17	25–12			75–44
25 Aug	11:00	Indonesia	0–3	India	21–25	18–25	25–27			64–77
25 Aug	17:00	Sri Lanka	0–3	South Korea	13–25	14–25	20–25			47–75

=== Pool D ===
Pos	Team	Pld	W	L	Pts	SW	SL	SR	SPW	SPL	SPR	Qualification
1	China	2	2	0	4	6	0	MAX	150	112	1.339	Pool F
2	Pakistan	2	1	1	3	3	4	0.750	156	156	1.000	Pool F
3	Chinese Taipei	2	0	2	2	1	6	0.167	135	173	0.780	Pool H

Date	Time		Score		Set 1	Set 2	Set 3	Set 4	Set 5	Total
23 Aug	11:00	Pakistan	3–1	Chinese Taipei	25–22	25–16	23–25	25–18		98–81
24 Aug	15:00	Pakistan	0–3	China	22–25	18–25	18–25			58–75
25 Aug	15:00	China	3–0	Chinese Taipei	25–14	25–21	25–19			75–54

== Classification round ==
- The results and the points of the matches between the same teams that were already played during the preliminary round shall be taken into account for the classification round.

=== Pool E ===
Pos	Team	Pld	W	L	Pts	SW	SL	SR	SPW	SPL	SPR	Qualification
1	Iran	3	3	0	6	9	2	4.500	272	212	1.283	Quarterfinals
2	India	3	2	1	5	7	4	1.750	252	228	1.105	Quarterfinals
3	South Korea	3	1	2	4	5	6	0.833	255	251	1.016	Quarterfinals
4	Qatar	3	0	3	3	0	9	0.000	137	225	0.609	Quarterfinals

Date	Time		Score		Set 1	Set 2	Set 3	Set 4	Set 5	Total
26 Aug	15:00	India	3–0	Qatar	25–14	25–14	25–13			75–41
26 Aug	17:00	Iran	3–1	South Korea	23–25	25–22	25–22	25–23		98–92
27 Aug	15:00	Qatar	0–3	South Korea	16–25	17–25	22–25			55–75
27 Aug	17:00	Iran	3–1	India	26–24	23–25	25–12	25–18		99–79

=== Pool F ===
Pos	Team	Pld	W	L	Pts	SW	SL	SR	SPW	SPL	SPR	Qualification
1	China	3	3	0	6	9	2	4.500	271	226	1.199	Quarterfinals
2	Pakistan	3	2	1	5	6	4	1.500	239	217	1.101	Quarterfinals
3	Australia	3	1	2	4	5	6	0.833	245	266	0.921	Quarterfinals
4	Japan	3	0	3	3	1	9	0.111	202	248	0.815	Quarterfinals

Date	Time		Score		Set 1	Set 2	Set 3	Set 4	Set 5	Total
26 Aug	13:00	Australia	1–3	Pakistan	25–20	15–25	34–36	16–25		90–106
26 Aug	19:00	China	3–1	Japan	25–21	25–20	23–25	25–22		98–88
27 Aug	13:00	Japan	0–3	Pakistan	15–25	22–25	15–25			52–75
27 Aug	19:00	Australia	1–3	China	25–23	14–25	18–25	23–25		80–98

=== Pool G ===
Pos	Team	Pld	W	L	Pts	SW	SL	SR	SPW	SPL	SPR	Qualification
1	Indonesia	2	2	0	4	6	2	3.000	194	137	1.416	9th–12th place
2	Sri Lanka	2	1	1	3	5	3	1.667	184	160	1.150	9th–12th place
3	Maldives	2	0	2	2	0	6	0.000	69	150	0.460	13th place

Date	Time		Score		Set 1	Set 2	Set 3	Set 4	Set 5	Total
26 Aug	09:00	Maldives	0–3	Sri Lanka	18–25	14–25	9–25			41–75
27 Aug	11:00	Maldives	0–3	Indonesia	13–25	10–25	5–25			28–75

=== Pool H ===
Pos	Team	Pld	W	L	Pts	SW	SL	SR	SPW	SPL	SPR	Qualification
1	Chinese Taipei	1	1	0	2	3	1	3.000	99	78	1.269	9th–12th place
2	Kazakhstan	1	0	1	1	1	3	0.333	78	99	0.788	9th–12th place

Date	Time		Score		Set 1	Set 2	Set 3	Set 4	Set 5	Total
26 Aug	11:00	Kazakhstan	1–3	Chinese Taipei	20–25	16–25	26–24	16–25		78–99

== Classification 9th–12th ==
9th–12th places
29 August – Tehran
Indonesia	3
Kazakhstan	0
29 August – Tehran
Chinese Taipei	3
Sri Lanka	0

9th place
30 August – Tehran
Indonesia	1
Chinese Taipei	3
11th place
30 August – Tehran
Kazakhstan	1
Sri Lanka	3

=== Semifinals ===
Date	Time		Score		Set 1	Set 2	Set 3	Set 4	Set 5	Total
29 Aug	09:00	Chinese Taipei	3–0	Sri Lanka	25–17	25–12	28–26			78–55
29 Aug	11:00	Indonesia	3–0	Kazakhstan	25–21	25–14	25–19			75–54

=== 11th place ===
Date	Time		Score		Set 1	Set 2	Set 3	Set 4	Set 5	Total
30 Aug	09:00	Kazakhstan	1–3	Sri Lanka	25–20	17–25	19–25	24–26		85–96

=== 9th place ===
Date	Time		Score		Set 1	Set 2	Set 3	Set 4	Set 5	Total
30 Aug	11:00	Indonesia	1–3	Chinese Taipei	25–23	18–25	17–25	22–25		82–98

== Final round ==
Quarterfinals
29 August – Tehran
Iran	3
Japan	0
29 August – Tehran
Pakistan	3
South Korea	0
29 August – Tehran
China	3
Qatar	0
29 August – Tehran
India	3
Australia	0

Semifinals
30 August – Tehran
Iran	3
Pakistan	0
30 August – Tehran
China	3
India	1

Final
31 August – Tehran
Iran	3
China	1
3rd place
31 August – Tehran
Pakistan	3
India	0

5th–8th places
30 August – Tehran
Japan	2
South Korea	3
30 August – Tehran
Qatar	0
Australia	3

5th place
31 August – Tehran
South Korea	0
Australia	3
7th place
31 August – Tehran
Japan	3
Qatar	0

=== Quarterfinals ===
Date	Time		Score		Set 1	Set 2	Set 3	Set 4	Set 5	Total
29 Aug	13:00	India	3–0	Australia	25–16	25–17	31–29			81–62
29 Aug	15:00	Pakistan	3–0	South Korea	25–18	25–21	27–25			77–64
29 Aug	17:00	Iran	3–0	Japan	25–23	25–22	25–12			75–57
29 Aug	19:00	China	3–0	Qatar	25–14	25–17	25–21			75–52

=== 5th–8th semifinals ===
Date	Time		Score		Set 1	Set 2	Set 3	Set 4	Set 5	Total
30 Aug	13:00	Japan	2–3	South Korea	25–21	22–25	27–25	22–25	11–15	107–111
30 Aug	15:00	Qatar	0–3	Australia	17–25	19–25	13–25			49–75

=== Semifinals ===
Date	Time		Score		Set 1	Set 2	Set 3	Set 4	Set 5	Total
30 Aug	17:00	Iran	3–0	Pakistan	25–23	25–20	25–20			75–63
30 Aug	19:00	China	3–1	India	21–25	25–18	25–19	25–23		96–85

=== 7th place ===
Date	Time		Score		Set 1	Set 2	Set 3	Set 4	Set 5	Total
31 Aug	10:00	Japan	3–0	Qatar	25–14	27–25	25–20			77–59

=== 5th place ===
Date	Time		Score		Set 1	Set 2	Set 3	Set 4	Set 5	Total
31 Aug	12:00	South Korea	0–3	Australia	25–27	26–28	21–25			72–80

=== 3rd place ===
Date	Time		Score		Set 1	Set 2	Set 3	Set 4	Set 5	Total
31 Aug	15:00	Pakistan	3–0	India	25–12	25–11	25–20			75–43

=== Final ===
Date	Time		Score		Set 1	Set 2	Set 3	Set 4	Set 5	Total
31 Aug	17:00	Iran	3–1	China	25–15	25–18	23–25	25–22		98–80

== Final standing ==
Rank	Team
1st place, gold medalist(s)	Iran
2nd place, silver medalist(s)	China
3rd place, bronze medalist(s)	Pakistan
4	India
5	Australia
6	South Korea
7	Japan
8	Qatar
9	Chinese Taipei
10	Indonesia
11	Sri Lanka
12	Kazakhstan
13	Maldives

Qualified for the 2009 World Junior Championship
Qualified for the 2009 World Junior Championship as hosts

2008 Asian Junior Men's champions

Iran
Fourth title

Team Roster

Mojtaba Shaban, Alireza Jadidi, Hamed Bagherpour, Golmohammad Sakhavi, Farhad Salafzoun, Edris Daneshfar, Farhad Ghaemi, Ebrahim Chabokian, Arash Kamalvand, Mohammad Taher Vadi, Mojtaba Ghiasi

Head Coach: Mostafa Karkhaneh

== Awards ==
- MVP: (Iran) Mojtaba Ghiasi
- Best scorer: (China) Dai Qingyao
- Best spiker: (China) Dai Qingyao
- Best blocker: (Iran) Alireza Jadidi
- Best server: (Iran) Mojtaba Ghiasi
- Best setter: (Iran) Farhad Salafzoun
- Best digger: (Iran) Golmohammad Sakhavi
- Best receiver: (Pakistan) Shahrukh Khan
