= Volleyball at the Military World Games =

Volleyball has been in the Military World Games event since the first inaugural edition in 1995 in Rome, Italy, Ruled and managed by the International Military Sports Council Body, The tournament serve as a friendship competitions between military nations it is a biennial multi-sport event.

== Indoor Volleyball ==
=== Men's tournaments ===
==== Summaries ====
Year	Host	Final			Third Place Game		
Year	Host	Gold Medal	Score	Silver Medal	Bronze Medal	Score	Fourth Place
1995; Details	(Italy); Rome	South Korea	3 – 2	Russia	Italy	3 – 0	China
1999; Details	(Croatia); Zagreb	Italy		Greece	Croatia		
2003; Details	(Italy); Catania	Italy	3 – 1	China	South Korea	3 – 1	Cameroon
2007; Details	(India); Hyderabad	China	Final Group	South Korea	India	Final Group	Qatar
2011; Details	(Brazil); Rio de Janeiro	Brazil	3 – 0	China	South Korea	3 – 1	Iran
2015; Details	(South Korea); Mungyeong	Brazil	3 – 1	Egypt	South Korea	3 – 0	Iran
2019; Details	(China); Wuhan	China	3 – 1	South Korea	Pakistan	3 – 0	Qatar

^n/a A round-robin tournament determined the final standings.

=== Medal summary ===
Rank	Nation	Gold	Silver	Bronze	Total
1	China	2	2	0	4
2	Italy	2	0	1	3
3	Brazil	2	0	0	2
4	South Korea	1	2	3	6
5	Egypt	0	1	0	1
5	Greece	0	1	0	1
5	Russia	0	1	0	1
8	Croatia	0	0	1	1
8	India	0	0	1	1
8	Pakistan	0	0	1	1
Totals (10 entries)		7	7	7	21

=== Women's tournaments ===
==== Summaries ====
Year	Host	Final			Third Place Game		
Year	Host	Champion	Score	Second Place	Third Place	Score	Fourth Place
1995; Details	(Italy); Rome	Canada	3 – 1	Netherlands	United States	3 – 0	China
1999; Details	(Croatia); Zagreb	Croatia		China	North Korea		
2003; Details	(Italy); Catania	North Korea	3 – 0	Greece	Italy	3 – 0	Netherlands
2007; Details	(India); Hyderabad	China	3 – 2	North Korea	Italy	3 – 1	United States
2011; Details	(Brazil); Rio de Janeiro	Brazil	3 – 1	China	Germany	3 – 1	Italy
2015; Details	(South Korea); Mungyeong	Brazil	3 – 0	China	Vietnam	3 – 0	Venezuela
2019; Details	(China); Wuhan	Brazil	3 – 1	China	North Korea	3 – 0	Germany

^n/a A round-robin tournament determined the final standings.

=== Medal summary ===
Rank	Nation	Gold	Silver	Bronze	Total
1	Brazil	3	0	0	3
2	China	1	4	0	5
3	North Korea	1	1	2	4
4	Canada	1	0	0	1
4	Croatia	1	0	0	1
6	Greece	0	1	0	1
6	Netherlands	0	1	0	1
8	Italy	0	0	2	2
9	Germany	0	0	1	1
9	United States	0	0	1	1
9	Vietnam	0	0	1	1
Totals (11 entries)		7	7	7	21

== The Combined medal table ==
Rank	Nation	Gold	Silver	Bronze	Total
1	Brazil (BRA)	5	0	0	5
2	China (CHN)	3	6	0	9
3	Italy (ITA)	2	0	3	5
4	South Korea (KOR)	1	2	3	6
5	North Korea (PRK)	1	1	2	4
6	Croatia (CRO)	1	0	1	2
7	Canada (CAN)	1	0	0	1
8	Greece (GRE)	0	2	0	2
9	Egypt (EGY)	0	1	0	1
9	Netherlands (NED)	0	1	0	1
9	Russia (RUS)	0	1	0	1
12	Germany (GER)	0	0	1	1
12	India (IND)	0	0	1	1
12	Pakistan (PAK)	0	0	1	1
12	United States (USA)	0	0	1	1
12	Vietnam (VIE)	0	0	1	1
Totals (16 entries)		14	14	14	42
