= Rasoul Najafi =

Iranian volleyball player (born 1991)

Personal information
- Nationality: Iranian
- Born: 23 July 1991 (age 35)
- Height: 196 cm (6 ft 5 in)
- Weight: 85 kg (187 lb)
- Spike: 325 cm (128 in)
- Block: 317 cm (125 in)

Volleyball information
- Number: 25 (national team)

Career
Years	Teams
2014; 2015; 2016	Matin Varamin; Vezarat Defa; Saipa Tehran

National team
2012–present	Iran

Rasoul Najafi (born 23 July 1991) is an Iranian male volleyball player. He is part of the Iran men's national volleyball team. On club level he plays for Saipa Tehran.

== Career ==
As a junior player he competed at the 2011 FIVB Men's Junior World Championship finishing 6th. Two years later he became with the national U23 team 5th at the 2013 FIVB Volleyball Men's U23 World Championship. With the national team he finished 5th at the 2015 Summer Universiade and competed in the 2015 FIVB Volleyball World League. With his club Saipa Tehran he played in the 2015–16 Iran Super League.

== Personal ==
He studied Physical Education at the Islamic Azad University in Tehran.
