= 2003 Military World Games =

International multi-sport event

2003 Military World Games 2003 Giochi mondiali militari
- Host city: Catania
- Country: Italy
- Nations: 87
- Athletes: 2800
- Events: 13
- Opening: December 4, 2003
- Closing: December 11, 2003
- Opened by: President Carlo Azeglio Ciampi
- Main venue: Cibali

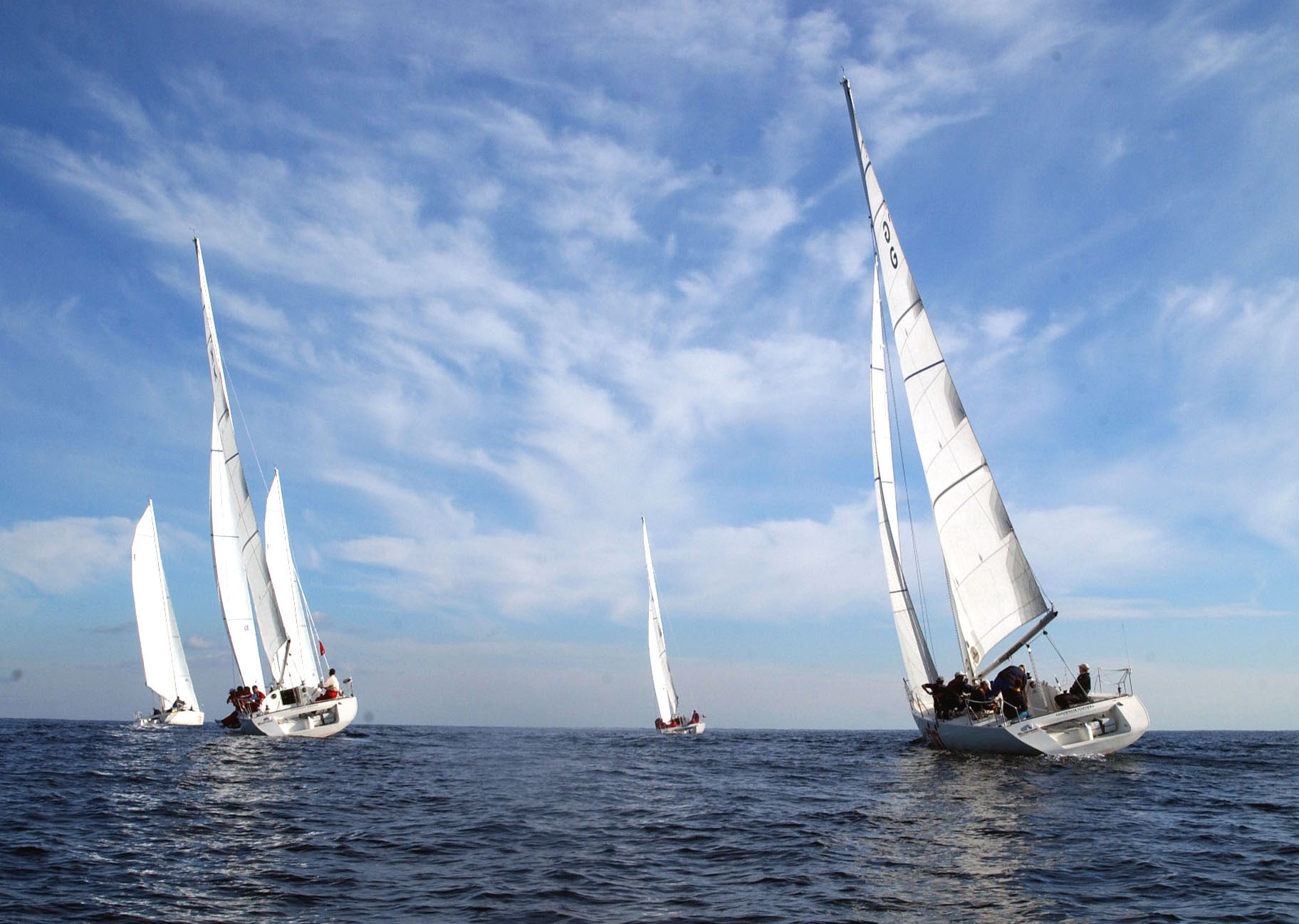
The sailing competition in the Mediterranean Sea.

The 2003 Military World Games was an international multi-sport event for military personnel which was held in Catania, Italy from 4–11 December 2003. It was the third edition of the Military World Games, competition organised by the Conseil International du Sport Militaire. A total of 84 nations were represented at the event, with some 2800 military servicemen and women competing in the tournament. The games opening ceremony took place at the Stadio Angelo Massimino in front of 5000 spectators.

== Sports ==
A total of thirteen sports were contested at the 2003 Games.

- Basketball
- Boxing
- Cycling
- Diving
- Fencing
- Football
- Judo
- Lifesaving
- Modern pentathlon
- Sailing
- Swimming
- Track and field
- Volleyball

== Games schedule ==
-	Ceremony	C	Competition	F	Finals

Competition schedule
December →	4	5	6	7	8	9	10	11
Opening ceremony								
Basketball	C						F	
Boxing	C							F
Cycling		F			F			
Diving		C			C			
Fencing			C	F				
Football		C		C				F
Judo		F		F				
Lifesaving			C					
Modern pentathlon		C				C	F	
Swimming		C						
Sailing			C					
Track and field			F					
Volleyball	C					F		
Closing ceremony								

- Note: The football tournament began before the Games opening ceremony, with the first matches taking place on 2 and 3 December.

== Medal table ==
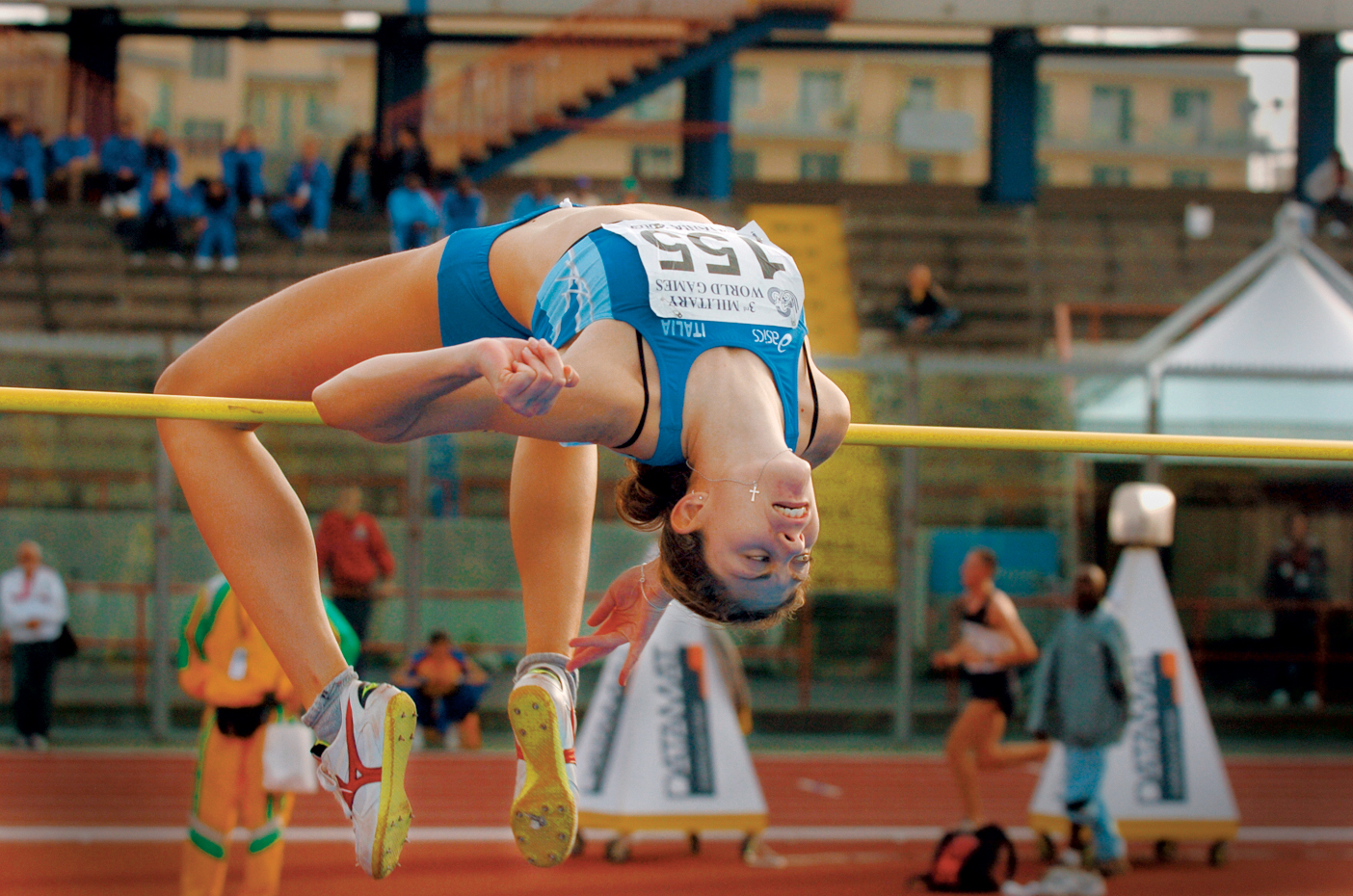
Action from the women's high jump in the track and field competition

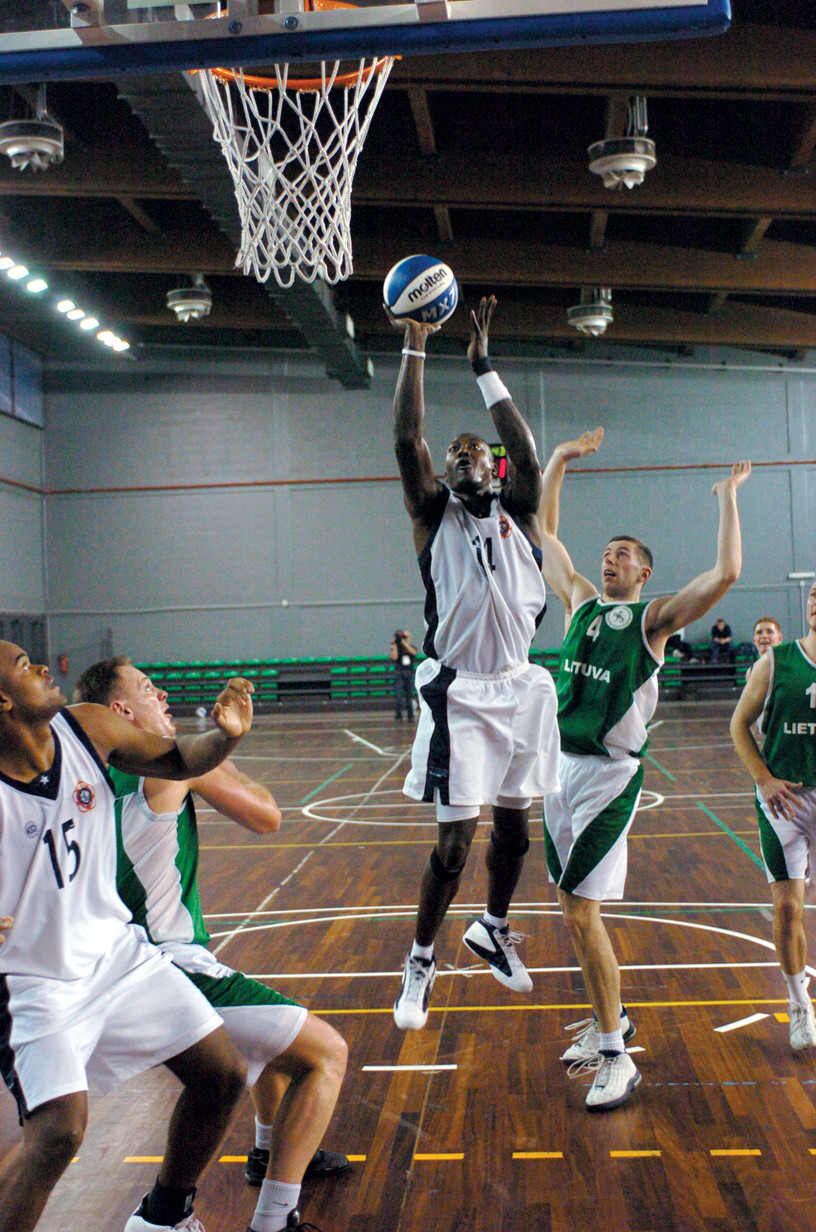
The basketball competition underway in Catania

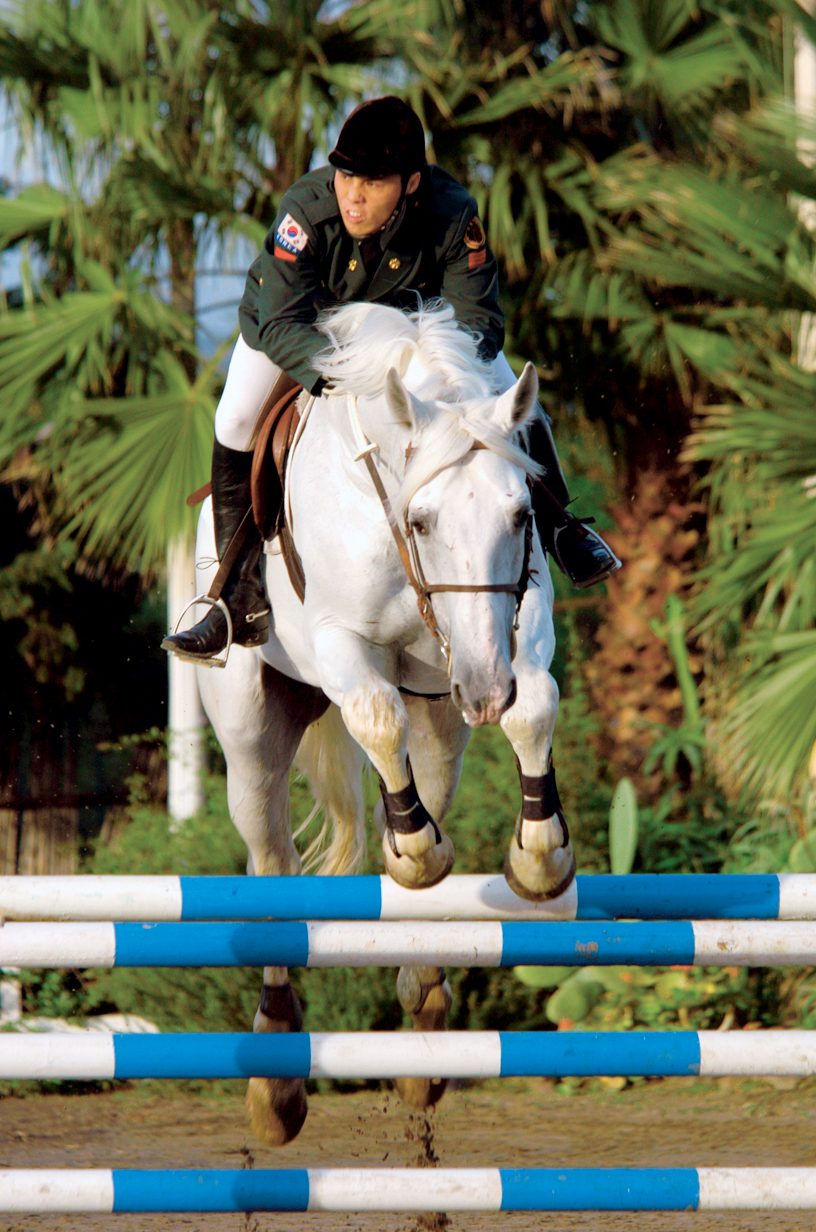
Equestrian events in the modern pentathlon in Catania

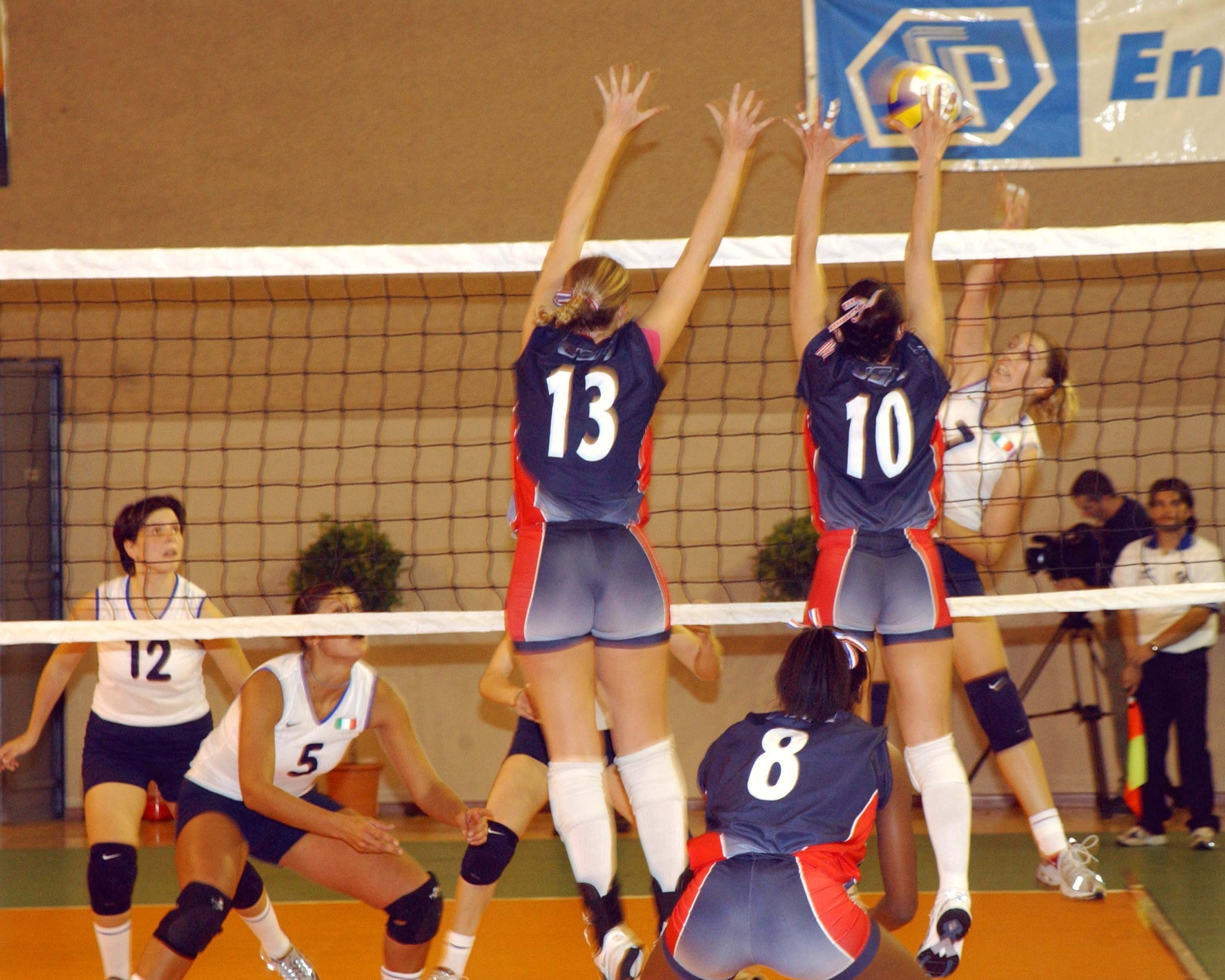
The 2003 women's volleyball competition

* Host nation (Italy)

Rank	Nation	Gold	Silver	Bronze	Total
1	China	31	15	12	58
2	Russia	25	34	33	92
3	Italy*	20	14	19	53
4	Ukraine	6	11	5	22
5	South Korea	5	4	5	14
6	Kenya	4	3	2	9
7	Belarus	4	1	5	10
8	Slovakia	4	1	1	6
9	Morocco	4	0	1	5
10	Latvia	2	1	3	6
11	Poland	2	1	1	4
12	Romania	1	5	8	14
13	Brazil	1	5	0	6
14	United Arab Emirates	1	3	2	6
15	Slovenia	1	2	3	6
16	United States	1	1	2	4
17	Greece	1	1	1	3
18	Bahrain	1	1	0	2
18	Estonia	1	1	0	2
20	Canada	1	0	4	5
21	Czech Republic	1	0	1	2
21	Netherlands	1	0	1	2
21	Serbia and Montenegro	1	0	1	2
24	Tunisia	1	0	0	1
25	Hungary	0	6	3	9
26	Austria	0	3	4	7
27	France	0	2	1	3
28	Rwanda	0	1	0	1
28	Sri Lanka	0	1	0	1
28	Tanzania	0	1	0	1
28	Turkey	0	1	0	1
32	Kazakhstan	0	0	3	3
32	Sweden	0	0	3	3
34	Azerbaijan	0	0	2	2
34	Belgium	0	0	2	2
34	Finland	0	0	2	2
37	Algeria	0	0	1	1
37	Botswana	0	0	1	1
37	Colombia	0	0	1	1
37	Cyprus	0	0	1	1
37	Qatar	0	0	1	1
Totals (41 entries)		120	119	135	374

- All information taken from Armed Forces Sports.

== Participation ==
- Afghanistan
- Albania
- Algeria
- Angola
- Argentina
- Austria
- Azerbaijan
- Bahrain
- Barbados
- Belarus
- Belgium
- Botswana
- Brazil
- Bulgaria
- Burkina Faso
- Burundi
- Cameroon
- Canada
- Chad
- Chile
- China
- Colombia
- Republic of the Congo
- Ivory Coast
- Croatia
- Cyprus
- Czech Republic
- Denmark
- Egypt
- Estonia
- Finland
- France
- Gabon
- Greece
- Guinea
- Hungary
- India
- Ireland
- Italy
- Jamaica
- Jordan
- Kazakhstan
- Kenya
- Kuwait
- Latvia
- Lebanon
- Libya
- Lithuania
- Luxembourg
- Mali
- Morocco
- Namibia
- Netherlands
- Niger
- North Korea
- Norway
- Pakistan
- Poland
- Portugal
- Qatar
- Romania
- Russia
- Rwanda
- Senegal
- Serbia and Montenegro
- South Africa
- Slovakia
- Slovenia
- South Korea
- Sri Lanka
- Sudan
- Sweden
- Switzerland
- Syria
- Tanzania
- Thailand
- Tunisia
- Turkey
- Ukraine
- United Arab Emirates
- United States
- Uzbekistan
- Vietnam
- Yemen
