= 2007 FIVB Volleyball Boys' U19 World Championship =

2007 Boys' Youth World Championship

Tournament details
- Host country: Mexico
- Dates: 15–26 August
- Teams: 16
- Venues: 2 (in 2 host cities)

Final positions
- Champions: Iran (1st title)

Tournament awards
- MVP: (Iran) Mojtaba Ghiasi

The 2007 FIVB Volleyball Boys' Youth World Championship took place from 15 to 26 August in the Mexican cities of Tijuana and Mexicali, Baja California.

== Competing nations ==
The following national teams have qualified:

Pool A	Pool B	Pool C	Pool D
Mexico; Tunisia; India; Belgium	Brazil; France; Egypt; Germany	Russia; Argentina; United States; China	Iran; Cuba; Poland; Puerto Rico

== Venues ==
- Gimnasio de Usos Multiples (Tijuana) – Pool A, C, E, F
- Auditorio del Estado (Mexicali) – Pool B, D, G, H

== First round ==
=== Pool A ===
Pos	Team	Pld	W	L	Pts	SW	SL	SR	SPW	SPL	SPR	Qualification
1	India	3	3	0	6	9	2	4.500	278	174	1.598	Pool E or Pool F
2	Belgium	3	2	1	5	7	3	2.333	238	202	1.178	Pool E or Pool F
3	Mexico	3	0	3	3	3	9	0.333	248	290	0.855	Pool G or Pool H
4	Tunisia	3	1	2	3	3	8	0.375	160	258	0.620	Pool G or Pool H

Date		Score		Set 1	Set 2	Set 3	Set 4	Set 5	Total
15 Aug	Tunisia	0–3*	India	0–25	0–25	0–25			0–75
15 Aug	Mexico	0–3	Belgium	17–25	15–25	22–25			54–75
16 Aug	Belgium	1–3	India	25–23	20–25	22–25	21–25		88–98
16 Aug	Mexico	2–3	Tunisia	23–25	26–24	23–25	25–21	11–15	108–110
17 Aug	Tunisia	0–3	Belgium	15–25	18–25	17–25			50–75
17 Aug	Mexico	1–3	India	28–30	27–25	15–25	16–25		86–105

* Forfeit

=== Pool B ===
Pos	Team	Pld	W	L	Pts	SW	SL	SR	SPW	SPL	SPR	Qualification
1	France	3	2	1	5	8	3	2.667	249	216	1.153	Pool E or Pool F
2	Brazil	3	2	1	5	6	4	1.500	230	215	1.070	Pool E or Pool F
3	Germany	3	2	1	5	7	5	1.400	254	239	1.063	Pool G or Pool H
4	Egypt	3	0	3	3	0	9	0.000	162	225	0.720	Pool G or Pool H

Date		Score		Set 1	Set 2	Set 3	Set 4	Set 5	Total
15 Aug	Egypt	0–3	France	9–25	20–25	16–25			45–75
15 Aug	Brazil	3–1	Germany	14–25	25–12	25–20	25–17		89–74
16 Aug	France	2–3	Germany	15–25	18–25	25–16	26–24	13–15	97–105
16 Aug	Brazil	3–0	Egypt	25–21	25–20	25–23			75–64
17 Aug	Germany	3–0	Egypt	25–17	25–17	25–19			75–53
17 Aug	Brazil	0–3	France	25–27	20–25	21–25			66–77

=== Pool C ===
Pos	Team	Pld	W	L	Pts	SW	SL	SR	SPW	SPL	SPR	Qualification
1	Argentina	3	2	1	5	8	5	1.600	306	287	1.066	Pool E or Pool F
2	China	3	2	1	5	6	5	1.200	251	258	0.973	Pool E or Pool F
3	United States	3	1	2	4	6	6	1.000	267	268	0.996	Pool G or Pool H
4	Russia	3	1	2	4	4	8	0.500	269	280	0.961	Pool G or Pool H

Date		Score		Set 1	Set 2	Set 3	Set 4	Set 5	Total
15 Aug	Argentina	3–1	United States	25–21	25–19	23–25	25–20		98–85
15 Aug	Russia	0–3	China	26–28	23–25	21–25			70–78
16 Aug	Russia	1–3	Argentina	25–27	25–18	21–25	26–28		97–98
16 Aug	China	0–3	United States	26–28	21–25	21–25			68–78
17 Aug	Argentina	2–3	China	26–24	25–16	23–25	23–25	13–15	110–105
17 Aug	Russia	3–2	United States	17–25	20–25	25–23	25–18	15–13	102–104

=== Pool D ===
Pos	Team	Pld	W	L	Pts	SW	SL	SR	SPW	SPL	SPR	Qualification
1	Poland	3	2	1	5	8	5	1.600	308	276	1.116	Pool E or Pool F
2	Iran	3	2	1	5	6	7	0.857	305	299	1.020	Pool E or Pool F
3	Cuba	3	1	2	4	7	6	1.167	276	282	0.979	Pool G or Pool H
4	Puerto Rico	3	1	2	4	5	8	0.625	274	306	0.895	Pool G or Pool H

Date		Score		Set 1	Set 2	Set 3	Set 4	Set 5	Total
15 Aug	Poland	3–2	Cuba	25–14	25–13	26–28	22–25	15–11	113–91
15 Aug	Iran	3–2	Puerto Rico	23–25	25–21	32–30	24–26	15–4	119–106
16 Aug	Iran	3–2	Poland	21–25	25–21	25–19	24–26	25–23	120–114
16 Aug	Cuba	2–3	Puerto Rico	25–17	25–20	24–26	19–25	13–15	106–103
17 Aug	Puerto Rico	0–3	Poland	22–25	29–31	14–25			65–81
17 Aug	Iran	0–3	Cuba	27–29	17–25	22–25			66–79

== Second round ==
=== Pool E ===
Pos	Team	Pld	W	L	Pts	SW	SL	SR	SPW	SPL	SPR	Qualification
1	Argentina	3	3	0	6	9	5	1.800	291	264	1.102	Championship round
2	Iran	3	1	2	4	6	7	0.857	281	283	0.993	Championship round
3	Brazil	3	1	2	4	4	6	0.667	223	233	0.957	5th–8th classification
4	India	3	1	2	4	4	7	0.571	254	269	0.944	5th–8th classification

Date		Score		Set 1	Set 2	Set 3	Set 4	Set 5	Total
20 Aug	India	1–3	Argentina	39–37	21–25	22–25	21–25		103–112
20 Aug	Iran	3–1	Brazil	25–15	22–25	28–26	25–20		100–86
21 Aug	India	3–1	Iran	18–25	25–17	25–21	25–19		93–82
21 Aug	Brazil	0–3	Argentina	20–25	21–25	21–25			62–75
22 Aug	India	0–3	Brazil	22–25	23–25	13–25			58–75
22 Aug	Argentina	3–2	Iran	25–17	18–25	21–25	25–21	15–11	104–99

=== Pool F ===
Pos	Team	Pld	W	L	Pts	SW	SL	SR	SPW	SPL	SPR	Qualification
1	France	3	2	1	5	7	5	1.400	263	235	1.119	Championship round
2	China	3	2	1	5	8	5	1.600	292	274	1.066	Championship round
3	Poland	3	2	1	5	8	7	1.143	317	324	0.978	5th–8th classification
4	Belgium	3	0	3	3	3	9	0.333	250	289	0.865	5th–8th classification

Date		Score		Set 1	Set 2	Set 3	Set 4	Set 5	Total
20 Aug	Belgium	1–3	China	25–21	21–25	21–25	18–25		85–96
20 Aug	France	3–2	Poland	25–18	21–25	25–13	21–25	15–10	107–91
21 Aug	Belgium	2–3	Poland	25–20	21–25	22–25	35–33	8–15	111–118
21 Aug	France	1–3	China	16–25	21–25	25–15	19–25		81–90
22 Aug	Poland	3–2	China	19–25	24–26	25–23	25–20	15–12	108–106
22 Aug	France	3–0	Belgium	25–20	25–18	25–16			75–54

=== Pool G ===
Pos	Team	Pld	W	L	Pts	SW	SL	SR	SPW	SPL	SPR	Qualification
1	Mexico	3	3	0	6	9	6	1.500	318	322	0.988	9th–12th classification
2	Puerto Rico	3	2	1	5	8	5	1.600	294	268	1.097	9th–12th classification
3	United States	3	1	2	4	7	6	1.167	286	256	1.117	13th–16th classification
4	Egypt	3	0	3	3	2	9	0.222	202	254	0.795	13th–16th classification

Date		Score		Set 1	Set 2	Set 3	Set 4	Set 5	Total
20 Aug	Puerto Rico	3–0	Egypt	25–17	25–21	25–17			75–55
20 Aug	Mexico	3–2	United States	23–25	25–22	18–25	25–21	15–13	106–106
21 Aug	United States	2–3	Puerto Rico	27–25	19–25	21–25	25–18	13–15	105–108
21 Aug	Mexico	3–2	Egypt	21–25	25–21	18–25	25–23	15–11	104–105
22 Aug	Egypt	0–3	United States	13–25	15–25	14–25			42–75
22 Aug	Mexico	3–2	Puerto Rico	15–25	23–25	26–24	25–20	19–17	108–111

=== Pool H ===
Pos	Team	Pld	W	L	Pts	SW	SL	SR	SPW	SPL	SPR	Qualification
1	Germany	3	3	0	6	9	3	3.000	282	239	1.180	9th–12th classification
2	Russia	3	2	1	5	7	3	2.333	238	220	1.082	9th–12th classification
3	Cuba	3	1	2	4	5	6	0.833	231	251	0.920	13th–16th classification
4	Tunisia	3	0	3	3	0	9	0.000	191	232	0.823	13th–16th classification

Date		Score		Set 1	Set 2	Set 3	Set 4	Set 5	Total
20 Aug	Russia	3–0	Tunisia	25–23	25–17	25–19			75–59
20 Aug	Germany	3–2	Cuba	18–25	25–14	22–25	25–13	15–13	105–90
21 Aug	Germany	3–0	Tunisia	29–27	25–16	25–21			79–64
21 Aug	Cuba	0–3	Russia	16–25	21–25	26–28			63–78
22 Aug	Tunisia	0–3	Cuba	26–28	19–25	23–25			68–78
22 Aug	Germany	3–1	Russia	23–25	25–22	25–23	25–15		95–85

== Final round ==
=== Classification 13th–16th ===
13th–16th places
25 August – Mexicali
United States	1
Tunisia	3
25 August – Mexicali
Cuba	3
Egypt	2

13th place
26 August – Mexicali
Tunisia	1
Cuba	3
15th place
26 August – Mexicali
United States	3
Egypt	0

Date		Score		Set 1	Set 2	Set 3	Set 4	Set 5	Total
25 Aug	United States	1–3	Tunisia	22–25	24–26	25–19	20–25		91–95
25 Aug	Cuba	3–2	Egypt	23–25	24–26	25–19	25–18	15–6	112–94

Date		Score		Set 1	Set 2	Set 3	Set 4	Set 5	Total
26 Aug	United States	3–0	Egypt	25–21	25–20	25–19			75–60
26 Aug	Tunisia	1–3	Cuba	21–25	32–30	23–25	21–25		97–105

=== Classification 9th–12th ===
9th–12th places
25 August – Mexicali
Mexico	0
Russia	3
25 August – Mexicali
Germany	3
Puerto Rico	1

9th place
26 August – Mexicali
Russia	3
Germany	1
11th place
26 August – Mexicali
Mexico	0
Puerto Rico	3

Date		Score		Set 1	Set 2	Set 3	Set 4	Set 5	Total
25 Aug	Germany	3–1	Puerto Rico	24–26	27–25	25–19	25–16		101–86
25 Aug	Mexico	0–3	Russia	13–25	12–25	16–25			41–75

Date		Score		Set 1	Set 2	Set 3	Set 4	Set 5	Total
26 Aug	Mexico	0–3	Puerto Rico	20–25	18–25	14–25			52–75
26 Aug	Russia	3–1	Germany	23–25	25–18	25–23	25–17		98–83

=== Classification 5th–8th ===
5th–8th places
25 August – Tijuana
Brazil	2
Belgium	3
25 August – Tijuana
Poland	3
India	1

5th place
26 August – Tijuana
Belgium	1
Poland	3
7th place
26 August – Tijuana
Brazil	3
India	1

Date		Score		Set 1	Set 2	Set 3	Set 4	Set 5	Total
25 Aug	Brazil	2–3	Belgium	25–21	28–30	16–25	25–17	15–17	109–110
25 Aug	Poland	3–1	India	25–20	20–25	25–18	25–23		95–86

Date		Score		Set 1	Set 2	Set 3	Set 4	Set 5	Total
26 Aug	Brazil	3–1	India	25–17	25–22	16–25	25–16		91–80
26 Aug	Belgium	1–3	Poland	13–25	23–25	25–17	15–25		76–92

=== Championship ===
Semifinals
25 August – Tijuana
France	0
Iran	3
25 August – Tijuana
Argentina	0
China	3

Final
26 August – Tijuana
Iran	3
China	2
3rd place
26 August – Tijuana
France	3
Argentina	1

Date		Score		Set 1	Set 2	Set 3	Set 4	Set 5	Total
25 Aug	France	0–3	Iran	22–25	19–25	23–25			64–75
25 Aug	Argentina	0–3	China	16–25	25–27	17–25			58–77

Date		Score		Set 1	Set 2	Set 3	Set 4	Set 5	Total
26 Aug	France	3–1	Argentina	25–20	18–25	26–24	27–25		96–94
26 Aug	Iran	3–2	China	21–25	25–22	26–24	29–31	15–7	116–109

== Final standing ==
Rank	Team
1st place, gold medalist(s)	Iran
2nd place, silver medalist(s)	China
3rd place, bronze medalist(s)	France
4	Argentina
5	Poland
6	Belgium
7	Brazil
8	India
9	Russia
10	Germany
11	Puerto Rico
12	Mexico
13	Cuba
14	Tunisia
15	United States
16	Egypt

2007 Boys' Youth World champions

Iran
1st title

Team Roster

Mojtaba Shaban, Moein Rahimi, Hamed Bagherpour, Ashkan Derakhshan, Farhad Salafzoun, Edris Daneshfar, Farhad Ghaemi, Ebrahim Chabokian, Mojtaba Ghiasi, Amin Razavi, Golmohammad Sakhavi, Alireza Jadidi

Head Coach: Jovica Cvetković

== Awards ==
- MVP: (Iran) Mojtaba Ghiasi
- Best scorer: (India) Mandeep Singh
- Best spiker: (China) Huang Bin
- Best blocker: (Iran) Alireza Jadidi
- Best server: (Cuba) Rolando Cepeda
- Best setter: (Argentina) Nicolás Uriarte
- Best digger: (United States) Erik Shoji
- Best receiver: (Puerto Rico) Dennis Del Valle
