= 2015–16 Iranian Volleyball Super League =

Locations of the 2015–16 season teams

The Iranian Volleyball Super League 2015–16 was the 29th season of the Iranian Volleyball Super League, the highest professional volleyball league in Iran.

== Regular season ==
=== Standings ===
Rank	Team	Matches			Pts	Details						Sets		
Rank	Team	Pld	W	L	Pts	3–0	3–1	3–2	2–3	1–3	0–3	W	L	Ratio
1	Sarmayeh Bank Tehran	20	17	3	50	9	7	1	0	2	1	53	18	2.944
2	Paykan Tehran	20	16	4	45	8	4	4	1	2	1	52	24	2.167
3	Shahrdari Urmia	20	15	5	46	5	9	1	2	1	2	50	26	1.923
4	Samen Al-hojaj Khorasan	20	11	9	34	4	5	2	3	2	4	41	36	1.139
5	Shahrdari Tabriz	20	11	9	32	5	1	5	4	3	2	44	38	1.158
6	Saipa Tehran	20	10	10	29	4	0	6	5	3	2	43	42	1.024
7	Matin Varamin	20	9	11	30	3	3	3	6	3	2	42	42	1.000
8	Arman Ardakan	20	9	11	23	2	1	6	2	5	4	36	46	0.783
9	Kalleh Mazandaran	20	7	13	22	4	2	1	2	5	6	30	43	0.698
10	Javaheri Gonbad	20	4	16	11	0	1	3	2	5	9	21	55	0.382
11	Aluminium Al-Mahdi Hormozgan	20	1	19	8	0	1	0	5	3	11	16	58	0.276
—	Gohar Kavir Zahedan	–	–	–	–	–	–	–	–	–	–	–	–	–

- Gohar Kavir Zahedan withdrew during the regular season due to financial problems. All results were declared null and void.

=== Results ===
	ALU	ARM	JAV	KAL	MAT	PAY	SAI	SAM	SAR	TAB	URM
Aluminium		3–1	2–3	1–3	2–3	0–3	2–3	0–3	0–3	2–3	1–3
Arman	3–0		3–1	3–2	3–2	1–3	3–2	1–3	0–3	3–2	3–2
Javaheri Gonbad	3–2	0–3		0–3	0–3	0–3	3–2	3–1	1–3	0–3	0–3
Kalleh	3–0	3–0	3–0		1–3	0–3	0–3	1–3	1–3	3–1	1–3
Matin	3–0	3–1	3–1	3–2		2–3	2–3	1–3	3–0	2–3	2–3
Paykan	3–0	3–0	3–0	3–0	3–1		3–2	2–3	1–3	3–1	3–0
Saipa	3–0	2–3	3–2	3–0	3–2	2–3		0–3	1–3	3–0	1–3
Samen Al-hojaj	3–0	3–2	3–1	3–0	3–1	1–3	2–3		2–3	0–3	0–3
Sarmayeh Bank	3–0	3–0	3–1	3–1	3–0	3–0	3–0	3–0		1–3	3–1
Shahrdari Tabriz	3–0	3–2	3–2	2–3	3–0	2–3	2–3	3–2	0–3		3–0
Shahrdari Urmia	3–1	3–1	3–0	3–0	2–3	3–1	3–1	3–0	3–1	3–1	

== Playoffs ==
- All times are Iran Standard Time (UTC+03:30).
- All series were the best-of-three format.

Quarterfinals
1	Sarmayeh Bank	3	3	—
8	Arman	0	0	—
4	Samen Al-hojaj	3	0	3
5	Shahrdari Tabriz	1	3	1
2	Paykan	3	0	3
7	Matin	2	3	1
3	Shahrdari Urmia	3	3	—
6	Saipa	1	0	—

Semifinals
1	Sarmayeh Bank	3	3	—
4	Samen Al-hojaj	1	1	—
2	Paykan	3	1	3
3	Shahrdari Urmia	1	3	2

Final
1	Sarmayeh Bank	2	3	3
2	Paykan	3	0	0
3rd place
4	Samen Al-hojaj	0	3	X
3	Shahrdari Urmia	3	0	X

=== Quarterfinals ===
Sarmayeh Bank Tehran vs. Arman Ardakan

Date	Time		Score		Set 1	Set 2	Set 3	Set 4	Set 5	Total
14 Feb	16:00	Sarmayeh Bank Tehran	3–0	Arman Ardakan	25–22	25–12	25–19			75–53
17 Feb	17:00	Arman Ardakan	0–3	Sarmayeh Bank Tehran	22–25	21–25	23–25			66–75

Samen Al-hojaj Khorasan vs. Shahrdari Tabriz

Date	Time		Score		Set 1	Set 2	Set 3	Set 4	Set 5	Total
14 Feb	17:00	Samen Al-hojaj Khorasan	3–1	Shahrdari Tabriz	26–24	26–24	22–25	25–23		99–96
25 Feb	17:00	Shahrdari Tabriz	3–0	Samen Al-hojaj Khorasan	25–16	25–22	25–23			75–61
21 Feb	17:00	Samen Al-hojaj Khorasan	3–1	Shahrdari Tabriz	27–29	25–23	25–18	25–21		102–91

Paykan Tehran vs. Matin Varamin

Date	Time		Score		Set 1	Set 2	Set 3	Set 4	Set 5	Total
14 Feb	18:00	Paykan Tehran	3–2	Matin Varamin	27–29	25–15	25–21	21–25	18–16	116–106
17 Feb	17:30	Matin Varamin	3–0	Paykan Tehran	25–23	26–24	25–19			76–66
21 Feb	17:00	Paykan Tehran	3–1	Matin Varamin	25–21	25–21	17–25	25–22		92–89

Shahrdari Urmia vs. Saipa Tehran

Date	Time		Score		Set 1	Set 2	Set 3	Set 4	Set 5	Total
14 Feb	17:00	Shahrdari Urmia	3–1	Saipa Tehran	28–26	25–15	25–27	25–16		103–84
17 Feb	17:00	Saipa Tehran	0–3	Shahrdari Urmia	18–25	19–25	22–25			59–75

=== Semifinals ===
Sarmayeh Bank Tehran vs. Samen Al-hojaj Khorasan

Date	Time		Score		Set 1	Set 2	Set 3	Set 4	Set 5	Total
24 Feb	17:30	Sarmayeh Bank Tehran	3–1	Samen Al-hojaj Khorasan	25–21	28–30	25–23	27–25		105–99
28 Feb	17:00	Samen Al-hojaj Khorasan	1–3	Sarmayeh Bank Tehran	26–24	24–26	22–25	20–25		92–100

Paykan Tehran vs. Shahrdari Urmia

Date	Time		Score		Set 1	Set 2	Set 3	Set 4	Set 5	Total
24 Feb	15:30	Paykan Tehran	3–1	Shahrdari Urmia	17–25	25–23	25–23	25–22		92–93
28 Feb	17:00	Shahrdari Urmia	3–1	Paykan Tehran	25–22	26–28	25–20	25–14		101–84
2 Mar	15:30	Paykan Tehran	3–2	Shahrdari Urmia	23–25	22–25	25–19	25–18	15–9	110–96

=== 3rd place ===
Samen Al-hojaj Khorasan vs. Shahrdari Urmia

Date	Time		Score		Set 1	Set 2	Set 3	Set 4	Set 5	Total
6 Mar	17:00	Shahrdari Urmia	3–0	Samen Al-hojaj Khorasan	25–0	25–0	25–0			75–0
9 Mar	17:00	Samen Al-hojaj Khorasan	3–0	Shahrdari Urmia	25–0	25–0	25–0			75–0
14 Mar	17:00	Shahrdari Urmia	–	Samen Al-hojaj Khorasan						Canceled

- Shahrdari Urmia and Samen Al-hojaj Khorasan shared the 3rd place.

=== Final ===
Sarmayeh Bank Tehran vs. Paykan Tehran

Date	Time		Score		Set 1	Set 2	Set 3	Set 4	Set 5	Total
6 Mar	15:30	Sarmayeh Bank Tehran	2–3	Paykan Tehran	25–21	25–23	16–25	20–25	10–15	96–109
7 Mar	15:30	Sarmayeh Bank Tehran	3–0	Paykan Tehran	28–26	25–21	25–20			78–67
14 Mar	16:00	Sarmayeh Bank Tehran	3–0	Paykan Tehran	25–0	25–0	25–0			75–0

== Final standings ==
Rank	Team	Qualification or relegation
1	Sarmayeh Bank Tehran	2016 Asian Club Championship
2	Paykan Tehran	
3	Samen Al-hojaj Khorasan	
3	Shahrdari Urmia	
5	Shahrdari Tabriz	
6	Saipa Tehran	
7	Matin Varamin	
8	Arman Ardakan	
9	Kalleh Mazandaran	
10	Javaheri Gonbad	
11	Aluminium Al-Mahdi Hormozgan	Relegation to the first division
—	Gohar Kavir Zahedan	Relegation to the first division

== Notable foreign players ==
- (Poland) Łukasz Żygadło (Sarmayeh Bank Tehran)
- (Italy) Valerio Vermiglio (Paykan Tehran)
- (Bulgaria) Nikolay Nikolov (Paykan Tehran)
- (Montenegro) Vojin Ćaćić (Samen Al-hojaj Khorasan)
- (Bulgaria) Valentin Bratoev (Shahrdari Tabriz)
- (Netherlands) Nico Freriks (Kalleh Mazandaran)
