= Afghanistan National Volleyball Federation =

Governing body of volleyball in Afghanistan

- Sport: Volleyball
- Abbreviation: ANVF
- Affiliation: International Volleyball Federation (FIVB)
- Regional affiliation: Asian Volleyball Confederation
- Headquarters: Kabul, Afghanistan
- Secretary: Khoshhal Malikzani
- (Islamic Republic of Afghanistan)

The Afghanistan National Volleyball Federation (ANVF) is the governing body of volleyball in Afghanistan.

The federation had called up a total 14 players for the 2014 Asian Games.

In order to pick players for the national team as well as 'A team', the federation conducted a 10-day national volleyball tournament for both men's and women's.
