= Bargh Kerman VC =

Iranian volleyball club

Bargh Kerman Volleyball Club (Persian: باشگاه والیبال برق کرمان) was an Iranian professional volleyball team based in Kerman, Iran. In 2011, Bargh was officially dissolved.
