= Javaheri Gonbad VC =

Javaheri Gonbad
- Full name: Bazargani Javaheri Gonbad Volleyball Club
- Short name: Gonbad
- Founded: 1996
- Ground: Olympic Arena, Gonbad-e Kavus
- Chairman: Rahmatollah Javaheri
- Manager: Baimohammad Davaji
- League: Iranian Super League
- 2015–16: 10th
- Website: Club home page

Uniforms
Home	Away

Bazargani Javaheri Gonbad Volleyball Club (Persian: باشگاه والیبال بازرگانی جواهری گنبد) is an Iranian professional volleyball team based in Gonbad-e Kavus, Iran. They compete in the Iranian Volleyball Super League.

== Sponsorship names ==
- Neopan (1996–2006)
- Esteghlal (2006–2008)
- Padisan (2008–2009)
- Bazargani Javaheri (2009–2011)
- Bazargani Javaheri (2012–present)

== Current squad ==
- 1. (Iran) Mehran Zare
- 3. (Iran) Abdolmajid Chogan
- 4. (Iran) Sakhi Eidi
- 6. (Iran) Ehsan Davaji
- 7. (Iran) Masoud Azizi
- 8. (Iran) Mohammad Reza Soleimani
- 10. (Iran) Mohammad Amin Hassanzadeh
- 11. (Iran) Abdollah Nazeri
- 13. (Iran) Kamal Ghoreishi
- 14. (Iran) Matin Takavar
- 15. (Iran) Golmohammad Sakhavi
- 17. (Iran) Vafa Zeinounli
- 18. (Iran) Hamid Mohammadalegh
- 19. (Brazil) João Ricardo Silva
- Heach coach: (Iran) Baimohammad Davaji
- Assistant coach: (Iran) Ahad Armashi
