= Damash Gilan VC =

Damash Gilan
- Full name: Damash Gilan Volleyball Club
- Short name: Damash
- Founded: 2008
- Dissolved: 2010
- Ground: Takhti Arena, Azodi Complex, Rasht
- Chairman: Amir Abedini
- League: Iranian Super League
- 2010–11: 5th
- Website: Club home page

Damash Gilan Volleyball Club (Persian: باشگاه والیبال داماش گیلان) was an Iranian professional volleyball team based in Rasht, Iran. The team is owned by Amir Abedini. They competed in the Iranian Volleyball Super League. Damash was dissolved after Presence Three year in volleyball Super League.

== Notable former players ==
- (Bulgaria) Miroslav Gradinarov
- (Bulgaria) Danail Milushev
- (Iran) Arash Keshavarzi
- (Iran) Mehdi Mahdavi
- (Iran) Mohammad Mohammad-Kazem
- (Iran) Alireza Nadi
- (Iran) Hamzeh Zarini
- (Iran) Saeed Marouf
