= Saipa Cultural and Athletic Corporation =

Saipa Tehran Athletic and Cultural Club is an Iranian multisport club based in Tehran and Karaj, Iran. The club was founded in 1989.

== Teams ==
- Saipa Football Club, competing in the Iran Pro League
- Saipa Volleyball Club, competing in the Iranian Super League
- Saipa Auto Racing Club
- Saipa Athletics Club
