= Saipa Tehran VC =

Saipa
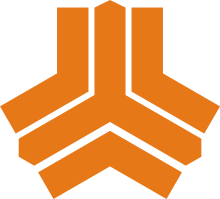
- Full name: Saipa Tehran Volleyball Club
- Short name: Saipa
- Founded: 1989; 31 years ago
- Ground: Tehran
- Chairman: (Iran) Beitollah Rezaei
- Manager: (Iran) Nasser Shahnazi
- League: Iranian Super League
- 2020–21: 5th
- Website: Club home page

Uniforms
Home	Away

Saipa Tehran Volleyball Club (Persian: باشگاه والیبال سایپا تهران, Bâshgâh-e Vâlibâl-e Sâipâ-ye Tehrân) (formerly known as Saipa Alborz) is an Iranian professional volleyball team based in Tehran, Iran. They compete in the Iranian Volleyball Super League. The team is owned by SAIPA, an Iranian automobile manufacturer. Saipa VC is the volleyball club of the multisport Saipa Cultural and Athletic Corporation.

== Names ==
- Saipa Tehran (1989–2009)
- Saipa Karaj (2009–2010)
- Saipa Alborz (2010–2015)
- Saipa Tehran (2015–)

== Current squad ==
- 1. (Bulgaria) Konstantin Mitev
- 2. (Iran) Moein Moeinifar
- 3. (Iran) Hamid Amini
- 4. (Iran) Rashid Yousefi
- 5. (Iran) Mohammad Fallah
- 6. (Iran) Asghar Najafi
- 8. (Iran) Alireza Safaei
- 9. (Iran) Mohammad Razipour
- 10. (Iran) Mohammad Daliri
- 11. (Iran) Rasoul Najafi
- 12. (Iran) Saeid Javaheri
- 13. (Iran) Hamed Tariverdi
- 14. (Iran) Jaber Esmaeilpour
- 16. (Iran) Mostafa Heydari
- 17. (Iran) Armin Ranjbar
- 18. (Iran) Amir Ali Fathali
- 19. (Bulgaria) Aleksandar Gorbatkov
- Heach coach: (Iran) Farhad Nafarzadeh
- Assistant coach: (Iran) Farshad Saeidi

== Notable former players ==
- (Bulgaria) Evgeni Ivanov
- (Bulgaria) Aleksandar Simeonov
- (Cuba) Ángel Dennis
- (Iran) Mehdi Mahdavi
- (Iran) Saeid Marouf
- (Iran) Farhad Nazari Afshar
- (Iran) Mohammad Torkashvand

== Honors ==
- Iranian Super League

Runners-up (7): 2006, 2008, 2009, 2010, 2011, 2012, 2019
Third place (1): 2007

- Asian Club Championships

Runners-up (1): 2005
