= 2022 AVC Cup for Men =

International indoor volleyball tournament

2022 Asian Men's Volleyball Cup
"เอสโคล่า" 2022 เอวีซี คัพ

Tournament details
- Host country: Thailand
- City: Nakhon Pathom
- Dates: 7–14 August
- Teams: 11 (from 1 confederation)
- Venue: 2 (in 1 host city)

Final positions
- Champions: China (2nd title)
- Runners-up: Japan
- Third place: Bahrain
- Fourth place: South Korea

Tournament awards
- MVP: (China) Zhang Jingyin
- Best Setter: (Japan) Akihiro Fukatsu
- Best OH: (China) Zhang Jingyin (Bahrain) Mohamed Abdulla
- Best MB: (China) Zhang Zhejia (China) Peng Shikun
- Best OPP: (Japan) Issei Otake
- Best Libero: (Bahrain) Husain Sultan

Tournament statistics
- Matches played: 29
- Attendance: 26,319 (908 per match)

The 2022 Asian Men's Volleyball Cup, so-called 2022 AVC Cup for Men was the seventh edition of the Asian Cup, a biennial international volleyball tournament organised by the Asian Volleyball Confederation (AVC) with Thailand Volleyball Association (TVA). The tournament was held at Nakhon Pathom Gymnasium, Nakhon Pathom, Thailand from 7 to 14 August 2022.

As hosts, Thailand automatically participate for the tournament, while the remaining 10 teams, qualified from the 2021 Asian Men's Volleyball Championship in Chiba, Japan.

== Host selection ==
On 2 December 2021, at the AVC meeting in Bangkok, Thailand, AVC initially announced that the tournament would be held in Taiwan. The tournament was to take place in the city of Taipei. But with Taiwan's strict COVID-19 protocols conflicting with FIVB and AVC's guideline, the tournament relocated to a new host country.

On 23 June 2022, AVC announced that Thailand will host the relocated 2022 Asian Men's Volleyball Cup.

== Qualification ==
The 12 AVC member associations qualified for the 2022 Asian Men's Volleyball Cup. Thailand qualified as hosts and the 11 remaining teams qualified from the 2021 Asian Championship and zonal wildcards. But later Qatar withdrew and China took its place, and Kazakhstan also withdrew. The 11 AVC member associations were from five zonal associations, including, Central Asia (3 teams), East Asia (5 teams), Oceania (1 team), Southeast Asia (1 team) and West Asia (1 team).

=== Qualified teams ===
The following teams qualified for the tournament.

Country	Zone	Qualified as	Qualified on	Previous appearances			Previous best performance
Country	Zone	Qualified as	Qualified on	Total	First	Last	Previous best performance
Iran	CAZVA	2021 Asian Championship champions	19 September 2021	7	2008	2018	Champions (2008, 2010, 2016)
Japan	EAZVA	2021 Asian Championship runners-up	19 September 2021	7	2008	2018	3rd place (2012, 2016, 2018)
Chinese Taipei	EAZVA	2021 Asian Championship 4th place	19 September 2021	5	2008	2018	4th place (2010, 2016, 2018)
~~Qatar~~	~~WAZVA~~	~~2021 Asian Championship 5th place~~	~~19 September 2021~~	~~1~~	~~2018~~	~~2018~~	~~Champions (2018)~~
Australia	OZVA	2021 Asian Championship 6th place	19 September 2021	7	2008	2018	5th place (2008, 2010)
Pakistan	CAZVA	2021 Asian Championship 7th place	19 September 2021	0	None		None
South Korea	EAZVA	2021 Asian Championship 8th place	19 September 2021	7	2008	2008	Champions (2014)
Bahrain	WAZVA	1st WAZVA wildcard team	2 February 2022	0	None		None
Hong Kong	EAZVA	1st EAZVA wildcard team	2 February 2021	0	None		None
India	CAZVA	2nd CAZVA wildcard team	2 February 2021	4	2010	2014	Runners-up (2014)
~~Kazakhstan~~	~~CAZVA~~	~~1st CAZVA wildcard team~~	~~2 February 2021~~	~~4~~	~~2010~~	~~2018~~	~~3rd place (2014)~~
Thailand	SEAZVA	Host country	23 June 2022	5	2018	2018	5th place (2018)
China	EAZVA	Reallocation	2 August 2022	6	2008	2018	Champions (2012)

== Pools composition ==
The overview of pools was released on 17 March 2022.

Pool A	Pool B	Pool C	Pool D
Thailand (Hosts)	Iran (1)	Japan (2)	Chinese Taipei (4)
South Korea (8)	Pakistan (7)	Australia (6)	~~Qatar (5)~~ China*
Hong Kong	~~Kazakhstan~~**	India	Bahrain

* Qatar withdrew and China took its place.
** Kazakhstan also withdrew.

== Venues ==
All matches (except Pool G)	Pool G
Nakhon Pathom, Thailand
Nakhon Pathom Gymnasium	RMUT Rattanakosin Sports Complex
Capacity: 4,000	Capacity: Unknown

== Pool standing procedure ==
1. Total number of victories (matches won, matches lost)
2. In the event of a tie, the following first tiebreaker will apply: The teams will be ranked by the most point gained per match as follows:
  - Match won 3–0 or 3–1: 3 points for the winner, 0 points for the loser
  - Match won 3–2: 2 points for the winner, 1 point for the loser
  - Match forfeited: 3 points for the winner, 0 points (0–25, 0–25, 0–25) for the loser
3. If teams are still tied after examining the number of victories and points gained, then the AVC will examine the results in order to break the tie in the following order:
  - Set quotient: if two or more teams are tied on the number of points gained, they will be ranked by the quotient resulting from the division of the number of all set won by the number of all sets lost.
  - Points quotient: if the tie persists based on the set quotient, the teams will be ranked by the quotient resulting from the division of all points scored by the total of points lost during all sets.
  - If the tie persists based on the point quotient, the tie will be broken based on the team that won the match of the Round Robin Phase between the tied teams. When the tie in point quotient is between three or more teams, these teams ranked taking into consideration only the matches involving the teams in question.

== Preliminary round ==
- All times are Indochina Time (UTC+7:00).

=== Pool A ===
Pos	Team	Pld	W	L	Pts	SW	SL	SR	SPW	SPL	SPR	Qualification
1	Thailand (H)	2	2	0	5	6	2	3.000	185	177	1.045	Pools E and F
2	South Korea	2	1	1	4	5	3	1.667	179	145	1.234	Pools E and F
3	Hong Kong	2	0	2	0	0	6	0.000	113	155	0.729	Pool G

(H) Host

Date	Time	Venue		Score		Set 1	Set 2	Set 3	Set 4	Set 5	Total	Report
7 Aug	15:00	NPG	Hong Kong	0–3	Thailand	22–25	28–30	23–25			73–80	Report
8 Aug	12:00	NPG	South Korea	3–0	Hong Kong	25–11	25–13	25–16			75–40	Report
9 Aug	15:00	NPG	Thailand	3–2	South Korea	17–25	23–25	25–19	25–23	15–12	105–104	Report

=== Pool B ===
Pos	Team	Pld	W	L	Pts	SW	SL	SR	SPW	SPL	SPR	Qualification
1	Iran	1	1	0	3	3	1	3.000	96	80	1.200	Pools E and F
2	Pakistan	1	0	1	0	1	3	0.333	80	96	0.833	Pools E and F

Date	Time	Venue		Score		Set 1	Set 2	Set 3	Set 4	Set 5	Total	Report
8 Aug	15:00	NPG	Pakistan	1–3	Iran	25–21	16–25	18–25	21–25		80–96	Report

=== Pool C ===
Pos	Team	Pld	W	L	Pts	SW	SL	SR	SPW	SPL	SPR	Qualification
1	Japan	2	2	0	6	6	0	MAX	152	99	1.535	Pools E and F
2	Australia	2	1	1	3	3	3	1.000	129	126	1.024	Pools E and F
3	India	2	0	2	0	0	6	0.000	94	150	0.627	Pool G

Date	Time	Venue		Score		Set 1	Set 2	Set 3	Set 4	Set 5	Total	Report
7 Aug	12:00	NPG	India	0–3	Japan	15–25	15–25	15–25			45–75	Report
8 Aug	09:00	NPG	Australia	3–0	India	25–17	25–20	25–12			75–49	Report
9 Aug	12:00	NPG	Japan	3–0	Australia	27–25	25–15	25–14			77–54	Report

=== Pool D ===
Pos	Team	Pld	W	L	Pts	SW	SL	SR	SPW	SPL	SPR	Qualification
1	China	2	2	0	6	6	2	3.000	198	175	1.131	Pools E and F
2	Bahrain	2	1	1	3	4	3	1.333	164	157	1.045	Pools E and F
3	Chinese Taipei	2	0	2	0	1	6	0.167	141	171	0.825	Pool G

Date	Time	Venue		Score		Set 1	Set 2	Set 3	Set 4	Set 5	Total	Report
7 Aug	18:00	NPG	Chinese Taipei	0–3	Bahrain	18–25	21–25	16–25			55–75	Report
8 Aug	18:00	NPG	China	3–1	Chinese Taipei	25–19	25–23	21–25	25–19		96–86	Report
9 Aug	18:00	NPG	Bahrain	1–3	China	29–27	19–25	19–25	22–25		89–102	Report

== Classification round ==
- All times are Indochina Time (UTC+7:00).
- The results and the points of the matches between the same teams that were already played during the preliminary round shall be taken into account for the classification round.

=== Pool E ===
Pos	Team	Pld	W	L	Pts	SW	SL	SR	SPW	SPL	SPR	Qualification
1	Japan	3	2	1	7	8	3	2.667	262	226	1.159	Semifinals
2	South Korea	3	2	1	5	8	7	1.143	331	324	1.022	Semifinals
3	Australia	3	1	2	4	5	7	0.714	264	282	0.936	5th–8th semifinals
4	Thailand (H)	3	1	2	2	4	8	0.500	255	280	0.911	5th–8th semifinals

(H) Host

Date	Time	Venue		Score		Set 1	Set 2	Set 3	Set 4	Set 5	Total	Report
11 Aug	15:00	NPG	Thailand	1–3	Australia	25–23	23–25	19–25	25–27		92–100	Report
11 Aug	18:00	NPG	Japan	2–3	South Korea	18–25	25–27	28–26	25–21	13–15	109–114	Report
12 Aug	15:00	NPG	Thailand	0–3	Japan	23–25	24–26	11–25			58–76	Report
12 Aug	18:00	NPG	South Korea	3–2	Australia	20–25	22–25	25–20	25–21	21–19	113–110	Report

=== Pool F ===
Pos	Team	Pld	W	L	Pts	SW	SL	SR	SPW	SPL	SPR	Qualification
1	China	3	3	0	9	9	2	4.500	273	228	1.197	Semifinals
2	Bahrain	3	2	1	6	7	4	1.750	263	243	1.082	Semifinals
3	Iran	3	1	2	3	5	7	0.714	256	273	0.938	5th–8th semifinals
4	Pakistan	3	0	3	0	1	9	0.111	200	248	0.806	5th–8th semifinals

Date	Time	Venue		Score		Set 1	Set 2	Set 3	Set 4	Set 5	Total	Report
11 Aug	09:00	NPG	Iran	1–3	Bahrain	16–25	19–25	25–22	18–25		78–97	Report
11 Aug	12:00	NPG	China	3–0	Pakistan	25–22	25–17	25–18			75–57	Report
12 Aug	09:00	NPG	Pakistan	0–3	Bahrain	18–25	25–27	20–25			63–77	Report
12 Aug	12:00	NPG	Iran	1–3	China	19–25	22–25	25–21	16–25		82–96	Report

=== Pool G ===
Pos	Team	Pld	W	L	Pts	SW	SL	SR	SPW	SPL	SPR
1	Chinese Taipei	2	2	0	6	6	0	MAX	150	108	1.389
2	India	2	1	1	3	3	4	0.750	160	175	0.914
3	Hong Kong	2	0	2	0	1	6	0.167	154	181	0.851

Date	Time	Venue		Score		Set 1	Set 2	Set 3	Set 4	Set 5	Total	Report
11 Aug	10:00	RRSC	Hong Kong	1–3	India	23–25	21–25	31–29	25–27		100–106	Report
12 Aug	10:00	RRSC	India	0–3	Chinese Taipei	22–25	18–25	14–25			54–75	Report
13 Aug	10:00	RRSC	Hong Kong	0–3	Chinese Taipei	17–25	21–25	16–25			54–75	Report

== Final round ==
- All times are Indochina Time (UTC+7:00).

=== 5th–8th places ===
5th–8th semifinals
13 August – Nakhon Pathom
Australia	2
Pakistan	3
13 August – Nakhon Pathom
Thailand	1
Iran	3

5th place match
14 August – Nakhon Pathom
Pakistan	0
Iran	3
7th place match
14 August – Nakhon Pathom
Australia	1
Thailand	3

==== 5th–8th semifinals ====
Date	Time	Venue		Score		Set 1	Set 2	Set 3	Set 4	Set 5	Total	Report
13 Aug	09:00	NPG	Thailand	1–3	Iran	14–25	23–25	25–20	22–25		84–95	Report
13 Aug	12:00	NPG	Australia	2–3	Pakistan	25–21	16–25	25–17	23–25	6–15	95–103	Report

==== 7th place match ====
Date	Time	Venue		Score		Set 1	Set 2	Set 3	Set 4	Set 5	Total	Report
14 Aug	09:00	NPG	Australia	1–3	Thailand	19–25	18–25	25–21	24–26		86–97	Report

==== 5th place match ====
Date	Time	Venue		Score		Set 1	Set 2	Set 3	Set 4	Set 5	Total	Report
14 Aug	12:00	NPG	Pakistan	0–3	Iran	18–25	16–25	24–26			58–76	Report

=== Final four ===
Semifinals
13 August – Nakhon Pathom
Japan	3
Bahrain	0
13 August – Nakhon Pathom
South Korea	2
China	3

Final
14 August – Nakhon Pathom
Japan	0
China	3
3rd place match
14 August – Nakhon Pathom
Bahrain	3
South Korea	0

==== Semifinals ====
Date	Time	Venue		Score		Set 1	Set 2	Set 3	Set 4	Set 5	Total	Report
13 Aug	15:00	NPG	Japan	3–0	Bahrain	27–25	25–15	25–20			77–60	Report
13 Aug	18:00	NPG	South Korea	2–3	China	25–20	17–25	34–32	27–29	15–17	118–123	Report

==== 3rd place match ====
Date	Time	Venue		Score		Set 1	Set 2	Set 3	Set 4	Set 5	Total	Report
14 Aug	15:00	NPG	Bahrain	3–0	South Korea	25–23	27–25	32–30			84–78	Report

==== Final ====
Date	Time	Venue		Score		Set 1	Set 2	Set 3	Set 4	Set 5	Total	Report
14 Aug	18:00	NPG	Japan	0–3	China	20–25	23–25	22–25			65–75	Report

== Final standing ==
Rank	Team
1st place, gold medalist(s)	China
2nd place, silver medalist(s)	Japan
3rd place, bronze medalist(s)	Bahrain
4	South Korea
5	Iran
6	Pakistan
7	Thailand
8	Australia
9	Chinese Taipei
10	India
11	Hong Kong

2022 Asian Men's Cup champions

China
2nd title

14–man roster
Dai Qingyao, Qu Zongshuai, Yang Yiming, Zhang Binglong, Yu Yuantai, Yu Yaochen (c), Li Yongzhen, Liu Meng, Jiang Zhengyang, Zhang Zhejia, Peng Shikun, Zhang Guanhua, Zhang Jingyin, Wang Bin
Head coach
Wu Sheng

== Awards ==
- Most valuable player
  Zhang Jingyin (CHN)
- Best setter
  Akihiro Fukatsu (JPN)
- Best outside spikers
  Zhang Jingyin (CHN)
  Mohamed Abdulla (BHR)
- Best middle blockers
  Zhang Zhejia (CHN)
  Peng Shikun (CHN)
- Best opposite spiker
  Issei Otake (JPN)
- Best libero
  Husain Sultan (BHR)

== See also ==
- 2022 Asian Women's Volleyball Cup
- 2022 Asian Men's Volleyball Challenge Cup
