= Aliasghar Mojarad =

Iranian volleyball player (born 1997)

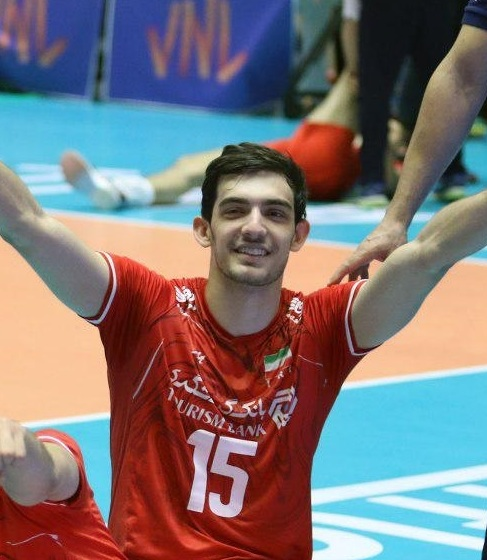

Personal information
- Full name: Aliasghar Mojarad
- Born: October 30, 1997 (age 28); Bojnord, Iran
- Height: 2.06 m (6 ft 9 in)
- Weight: 90 kg (198 lb)
- Spike: 3.70 m (146 in)
- Block: 3.50 m (138 in)

Volleyball information
- Position: Middle blocker
- Current club: (Romania) Rapid Bucuresti
- Number: 15

Career
Years	Teams
2013–2014; 2014–2015; 2015–2016; 2018–2020; 2020–2021; 2021–2022; 2022-2023; 2023-	(Iran) Erteashat Sanati (Iran) Shahrdari Bojnurd (Iran) Parseh Tehran (Iran) Shahrdari Varamin (Iran) Foolad Sepahan (Iran) Shahrdari Urmia (Iran) EEFA Ceram Ardakan (Romania) Rapid Bucuresti

National team
2014–15; 2015–16; 2016–	Iran U-19; Iran U-21; Iran
Honours
Representing Iran
Men's volleyball
Islamic Solidarity Games
Gold medal – first place	2017 Islamic Solidarity Games	Team
AVC Cup
Silver medal – second place	2018 Asian Men's Volleyball Cup	Team
Asian Championship
Gold medal – first place	2019 Iran	Team
Gold medal – first place	2021 Japan	Team
Men's Asian U20 Championship
Silver medal – second place	2016 Taiwan	Team
U19 World Championship
Bronze medal – third place	2015 Argentina	Team
U18 Asian Championship
Gold medal – first place	2014 Sri Lanka	Team

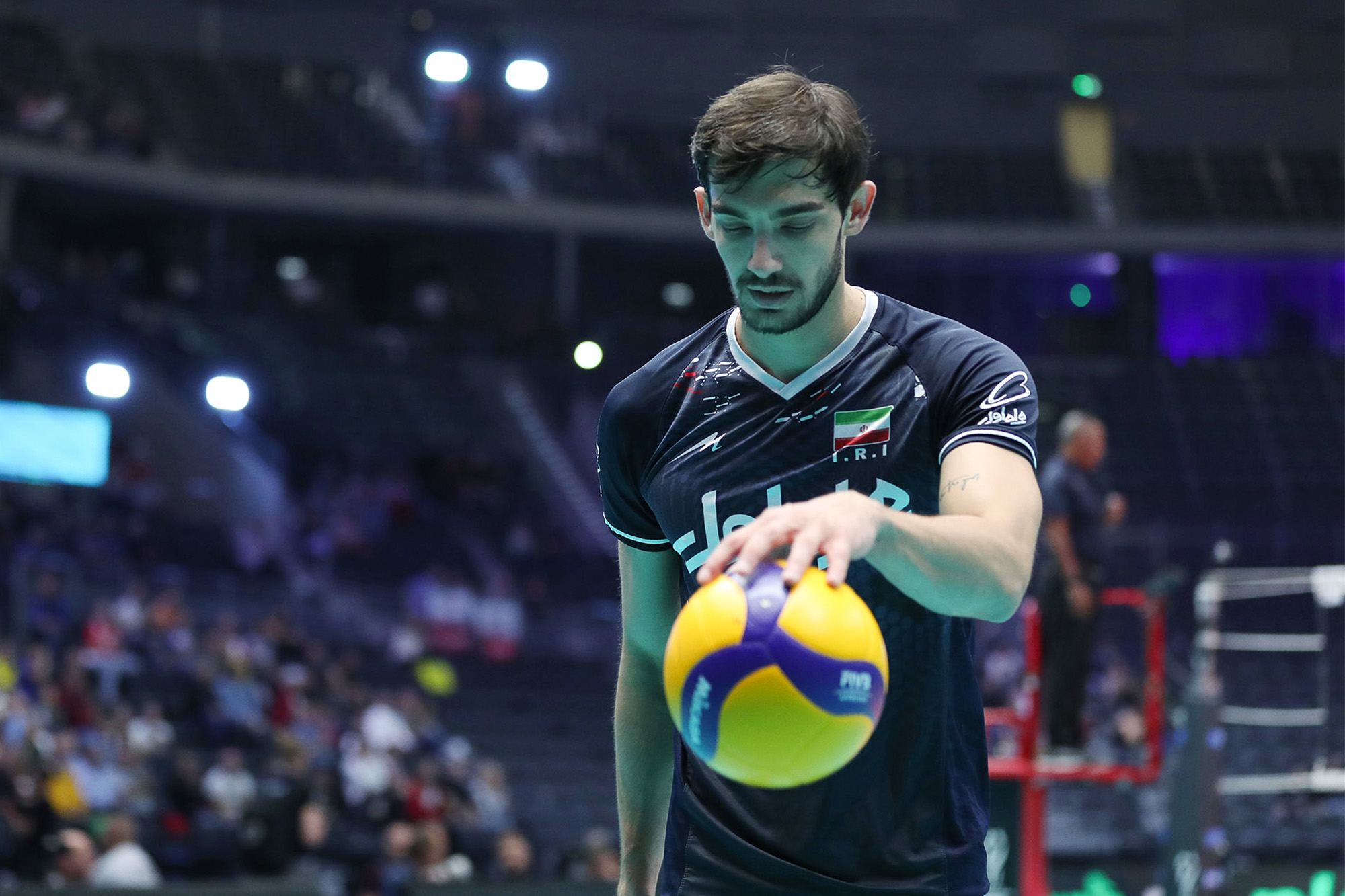

Aliasghar Mojarad (Persian: علی‌اصغر مجرد, born October 30, 1997, in Bojnord) is an Iranian Olympian volleyball player who plays as a middle blocker for the Iranian national team, Iranian clubs and European clubs.

He made his debut for Iranian national team in first fixtures of 2019 FIVB Volleyball Nations League against Italy. He was named best middle blocker at several international and national tournaments including 2014 Asian Boys' U18 Volleyball Championship, 2015 FIVB Volleyball Boys' U19 World Championship, 2015 Asian Men's U23 Volleyball Championship, 2018 Asian Men's Volleyball Cup, Iranian Volleyball Super League 2017, 2018 and 2019 as well as second middle blocker at 2019 FIVB Volleyball Men's World Cup.

== Honours ==
=== National team ===
- U19 World Championship
  - (bronze) Bronze (1): 2015
  - (bronze) Bronze (1): 2022
- Asian Championship
  - (gold) Gold (1): 2019
- Asian U18 Championship
  - (gold) Gold (1): 2014

=== Individual ===
- Best Middle Blocker: 2014 Asian U18 Championship
- Best Middle Blocker: 2015 U19 World Championship
- Best Middle Blocker: 2015 Asian U23 Championship
- Best Middle Blocker: 2018 Asian Cup
- Best Middle Blocker: Iranian Volleyball Super League 2017, 2018 and 2019
- Best Middle Blocker: 2021 Asian Championship

== See also ==
- Milad Ebadipour
