= Rahman Davoudi =

Iranian volleyball player

Personal information
- Full name: Rahman Davoudi
- Born: February 18, 1988 (age 38); Malayer, Iran
- Height: 1.95 m (6 ft 5 in)
- Weight: 95 kg (209 lb)
- Spike: 3.48 m (137 in)
- Block: 3.28 m (129 in)

Volleyball information
- Position: Outside spiker
- Number: 11
Honours
Representing Iran
Men's volleyball
Asian Championship
Gold medal – first place	2013 Dubai	Team
Silver medal – second place	2015 Tehran	Team
Asian Cup
Gold medal – first place	2016 Nakhon Pathom	Team

Rahman Davoudi (Persian: رحمان داوودی; born February 18, 1988, in Malayer), is an Iranian volleyball player who plays for Matin Varamin and Iran men's national volleyball team.

== Honours ==
=== National team ===
- Asian Championship
  - Gold medal (1): 2013
  - Silver medal (1): 2015
- Asian Cup
  - Gold medal (1): 2016
- U21 World Championship
  - Bronze medal (1): 2007
- Asian U20 Championship
  - Gold medal (1): 2006
- Asian U18 Championship
  - Gold medal (1): 2005

=== Individual ===
- Best outside spiker: 2016 Asian Cup
