= 2005 Asian Youth Boys' Volleyball Championship =

Tournament details
- Host country: Iran
- Dates: 13–19 May
- Teams: 8
- Venue: 1 (in 1 host city)

Final positions
- Champions: Iran (2nd title)

Tournament awards
- MVP: (Iran) Saber Narimannejad

The 2005 Asian Youth Boys' Volleyball Championship was held at the Azadi Volleyball Hall, Tehran, Iran from 13 to 19 May 2005.

== Pools composition ==
The teams were seeded based on their final ranking at the 2003 Asian Youth Boys Volleyball Championship.

Pool A	Pool B
Iran (Host & 2nd); Thailand (5th); Japan; Chinese Taipei	India (1st); China (4th); South Korea; Australia

== Preliminary round ==
=== Pool A ===
Pos	Team	Pld	W	L	Pts	SW	SL	SR	SPW	SPL	SPR	Qualification
1	Iran	3	3	0	6	9	1	9.000	248	206	1.204	Quarterfinals
2	Chinese Taipei	3	2	1	5	6	4	1.500	238	225	1.058	Quarterfinals
3	Japan	3	1	2	4	4	6	0.667	222	227	0.978	Quarterfinals
4	Thailand	3	0	3	3	1	9	0.111	198	248	0.798	Quarterfinals

Date		Score		Set 1	Set 2	Set 3	Set 4	Set 5	Total
13 May	Chinese Taipei	3–0	Thailand	25–20	25–20	25–18			75–58
13 May	Iran	3–0	Japan	25–16	25–17	25–22			75–55
14 May	Japan	1–3	Chinese Taipei	20–25	25–22	21–25	26–28		92–100
14 May	Thailand	1–3	Iran	25–23	19–25	23–25	21–25		88–98
15 May	Japan	3–0	Thailand	25–13	25–19	25–20			75–52
15 May	Chinese Taipei	0–3	Iran	20–25	20–25	18–25			63–75

=== Pool B ===
Pos	Team	Pld	W	L	Pts	SW	SL	SR	SPW	SPL	SPR	Qualification
1	South Korea	3	3	0	6	9	2	4.500	268	233	1.150	Quarterfinals
2	India	3	2	1	5	7	6	1.167	297	281	1.057	Quarterfinals
3	China	3	1	2	4	6	8	0.750	287	305	0.941	Quarterfinals
4	Australia	3	0	3	3	3	9	0.333	247	280	0.882	Quarterfinals

Date		Score		Set 1	Set 2	Set 3	Set 4	Set 5	Total
13 May	China	3–2	Australia	25–22	21–25	21–25	25–23	15–8	107–103
13 May	India	1–3	South Korea	25–23	23–25	21–25	23–25		92–98
14 May	South Korea	3–1	China	25–22	25–17	20–25	25–18		95–82
14 May	Australia	1–3	India	22–25	25–23	17–25	21–25		85–98
15 May	South Korea	3–0	Australia	25–21	25–17	25–21			75–59
15 May	China	2–3	India	17–25	25–20	21–25	25–22	10–15	98–107

== Final round ==
Quarterfinals
17 May – Tehran
Iran	3
Australia	1
17 May – Tehran
India	3
Japan	2
17 May – Tehran
South Korea	3
Thailand	2
17 May – Tehran
Chinese Taipei	3
China	2

Semifinals
18 May – Tehran
Iran	3
India	0
18 May – Tehran
South Korea	3
Chinese Taipei	1

Final
19 May – Tehran
Iran	3
South Korea	0
3rd place
19 May – Tehran
India	3
Chinese Taipei	0

5th–8th places
18 May – Tehran
Australia	0
Japan	3
18 May – Tehran
Thailand	0
China	3

5th place
19 May – Tehran
Japan	3
China	1
7th place
19 May – Tehran
Australia	0
Thailand	3

=== Quarterfinals ===
Date		Score		Set 1	Set 2	Set 3	Set 4	Set 5	Total
17 May	India	3–2	Japan	20–25	27–29	25–20	25–23	15–11	112–108
17 May	South Korea	3–2	Thailand	19–25	25–14	25–20	24–26	15–11	108–96
17 May	Iran	3–1	Australia	26–24	23–25	25–14	25–18		99–81
17 May	Chinese Taipei	3–2	China	28–30	27–29	25–23	25–20	15–12	120–114

=== 5th–8th semifinals ===
Date		Score		Set 1	Set 2	Set 3	Set 4	Set 5	Total
18 May	Thailand	0–3	China	19–25	16–25	22–25			57–75
18 May	Australia	0–3	Japan	23–25	15–25	15–25			53–75

=== Semifinals ===
Date		Score		Set 1	Set 2	Set 3	Set 4	Set 5	Total
18 May	Iran	3–0	India	25–19	25–15	25–22			75–56
18 May	South Korea	3–1	Chinese Taipei	23–25	25–21	25–23	25–16		98–85

=== 7th place ===
Date		Score		Set 1	Set 2	Set 3	Set 4	Set 5	Total
19 May	Australia	0–3	Thailand	23–25	22–25	23–25			68–75

=== 5th place ===
Date		Score		Set 1	Set 2	Set 3	Set 4	Set 5	Total
19 May	Japan	3–1	China	22–25	25–15	28–26	25–15		100–81

=== 3rd place ===
Date		Score		Set 1	Set 2	Set 3	Set 4	Set 5	Total
19 May	India	3–0	Chinese Taipei	25–21	25–22	25–22			75–65

=== Final ===
Date		Score		Set 1	Set 2	Set 3	Set 4	Set 5	Total
19 May	Iran	3–0	South Korea	25–20	25–16	25–12			75–48

== Final standing ==
Rank	Team
1st place, gold medalist(s)	Iran
2nd place, silver medalist(s)	South Korea
3rd place, bronze medalist(s)	India
4	Chinese Taipei
5	Japan
6	China
7	Thailand
8	Australia

Qualified for the 2005 FIVB U19 World Championship

2005 Asian Youth Boys champions

Iran
Second title

Team Roster
Arash Keshavarzi, Mohammad Mousavi, Abdolreza Alizadeh, Mansour Zadvan, Saber Narimannejad, Ali Sajjadi, Milad Sadeghi, Ashkan Derakhshan, Vali Nourmohammadi, Ali Najafi, Mostafa Sharifat, Rahman Davoudi
Head Coach: Ahmad Pourkashian

== Awards ==
- MVP: (Iran) Saber Narimannejad
- Best scorer: (Iran) Mansour Zadvan
- Best spiker: (South Korea) Kang Young-jun
- Best blocker: (India) Guttikonda Pradeep
- Best server: (Iran) Arash Keshavarzi
- Best setter: (South Korea) Kim Gwang-guk
- Best libero: (Iran) Abdolreza Alizadeh
