= Young-jun =

- Hangul: 영준
- RR: Yeongjun
- MR: Yŏngjun
- IPA: [jʌŋd͡ʑun]

Young-jun, also spelled Yeong-joon, Yeong-jun, Young-joon, or Yong-jun, is a Korean given name.

People with this name include:

- Seo Yeong-jun (born 1995), South Korean ice hockey player
- Byun Young-joon (born 1984), South Korean racewalker
- Choi Young-jun (footballer, born 1965), South Korean footballer
- Choi Young-jun (footballer, born 1991), South Korean footballer
- Goh Young-jun (born 2001), South Korean footballer
- Ji Young-jun (born 1981), South Korean long-distance runner
- Kang Young-jun (born 1987), South Korean volleyball player
- Kim Young-jun (wrestler) (born 1948), South Korean former wrestler
- Yoo Ha (born Kim Young-joon, 1963), South Korean film director
- Kim Young-jun (tennis) (born 1980), South Korean former tennis player
- Kim Si-hoo (born Kim Young-joon, 1988), South Korean actor
- Kim Yong-jun (footballer) (born 1983), North Korean football manager
- Lee Young-jun (ice hockey) (born 1991), South Korean ice hockey player
- Lee Young-jun (footballer) (born 2003), South Korean footballer
- Park Yeong-jun (born 1965), South Korean track and field athlete
- Shin Young-jun (born 1989), South Korean footballer
- Won Young-jun (born 1998), South Korean swimmer

== See also ==
- List of Korean given names
