= Masoud Gholami =

Iranian volleyball player (born 1991)

Personal information
- Full name: Masoud Gholami
- Born: April 2, 1991 (age 35); Kashan, Iran
- Height: 2.00 m (6 ft 7 in)
- Weight: 95 kg (209 lb)
- Spike: 2.89 m (114 in)
- Block: 2.75 m (108 in)

Volleyball information
- Position: Middle blocker
- Current club: (Iran) Shahrdari Urmia
- Number: 9

Career
Years	Teams
2009–2012; 2012–2014; 2014–2015; 2015–2017; 2017–2018; 2019–2020; 2020–	(Iran) Barij Essence Kashan (Iran) Saipa Alborz (Iran) Vezarat Defa (Iran) Paykan Tehran (Iran) Sazman Omran Shahrdari Sari (Iran) Shahrdari Varamin (Iran) Shahrdari Urmia
Honours
Representing Iran
Men's volleyball
World Grand Champions Cup
Bronze medal – third place	2017 Japan	Team
Asian Championship
Gold medal – first place	2019 Tehran	Team
Silver medal – second place	2015 Tehran	Team
Asian Cup
Gold medal – first place	2016 Nakhon Pathom	Team

Masoud Gholami (Persian: مسعود غلامی, born 2 April 1991) is an Iranian volleyball player who plays as a middle blocker for the Iranian national team. He was part of national team in the 2015 Asian Championship.

== Honours ==
=== National team ===
- World Grand Champions Cup
  - Bronze medal (1): 2017
- Asian Championship
  - Gold medal (1): 2019
  - Silver medal (1): 2015
- Asian Cup
  - Gold medal (1): 2016

=== Individual ===
- Best Middle Blocker: 2016 Asian Cup
