= Arash Keshavarzi =

Iranian volleyball player

Personal information
- Full name: Arash Keshavarzi
- Born: 1987 (age 38–39); Tehran, Iran
- Height: 1.98 m (6 ft 6 in)
- Weight: 94 kg (207 lb)
- Spike: 3.50 m (138 in)
- Block: 3.40 m (134 in)

Volleyball information
- Position: Outside hitter
- Current club: Shahrdari Tabriz

Career
Teams
	(Iran) Etka (Iran) Persepolis (Iran) Damash (Iran) Paykan (Iran) Matin (Iran) Shahrdari Tabriz (Iran) Shahrdari Urmia; Shahrdari Tabriz

National team
2004–2006; 2008–2013	Juniors; Iran
Honours
Men's volleyball
Representing Iran
Asian Youth Volleyball Championship
Gold medal – first place	2005 Tehran	Team
Asian Junior Championship
Gold medal – first place	2006 Tehran	Team
Asian Games
Silver medal – second place	2010 Guangzhou	Team
Asian Championship
Gold medal – first place	2011 Tehran	Team
AVC Cup
Gold medal – first place	2008 Nakhon Ratchasima	Team
Gold medal – first place	2010 Urmia	Team

Arash Keshavarzi (Persian: آرش کشاورزی, born 1987 in Tehran) is a volleyball player from Iran, who plays as an outside hitter for the Men's National Team and Shahrdari Tabriz in Iranian Volleyball Super League. He is of Iranian Azerbaijani descent. Arash Keshavarzi has been a member of the national volleyball team in 2013, 2014 and 2015 World League.
