= Issei Otake =

Japanese volleyball player (born 1995)

Personal information
- Full name: Issei Ōtake
- Born: 3 December 1995 (age 30) Kanagawa Prefecture, Japan
- Education: Chuo University
- Height: 2.01 m (6 ft 7 in)
- Weight: 98 kg (216 lb)
- Spike: 345 cm (136 in)
- Block: 327 cm (129 in)

Volleyball information
- Position: Opposite spiker
- Current club: (South Korea) Seoul Woori Card Woori Won
- Number: 4

National team
- Years: Team
- 2013: Japan U-19 national team
- 2015: Japan U-21 national team
- 2017: Japan U-23 national team
- 2017–2022: Japan senior national team
Medal record
Men's volleyball
Representing Japan
Asian Championship
Gold medal – first place	2017 Gresik	Team
Bronze medal – third place	2019 Tehran	Team
Silver medal – second place	2021 Chiba/Funabashi	Team
Asian Cup
Bronze medal – third place	2016 Nakhon Pathom	Team
Silver medal – second place	2022 Nakhon Pathom	Team
Asian U23 Championship
Silver medal – second place	2017 Ardabil	Team

Issei Otake (大竹 壱青, Ōtake Issei; born 3 December 1995) is a Japanese volleyball player. He plays in V.League 1 for Panasonic Panthers and Japan's national team.

== Career ==
=== Clubs ===
Issei Otake joined the Asian quota try-out for Korean volleyball league and was selected by Seoul Woori Card Woori Won as its first Asian foreign player.

== Personal life ==
Otake's older sister, Riho Otake, and father, Hideyuki Otake, are also national volleyball players.

== Clubs ==
- (Japan) Chuo University (2014–2017)
- (Germany) United Volleys Rhein-Main (2017–2018)
- (Japan) Panasonic Panthers (2018–2023)
- (South Korea) Seoul Woori Card Woori Won (2023–Present)

== Awards ==
=== Individual ===
- 2022 AVC Cup – Best opposite spiker

Awards
Preceded by (Qatar) Mubarak Hammad	Best Opposite Spiker of Asian Volleyball Cup; 2022	Succeeded by TBD
