= Mohammad Taher Vadi =

Iranian volleyball player (born 1989)

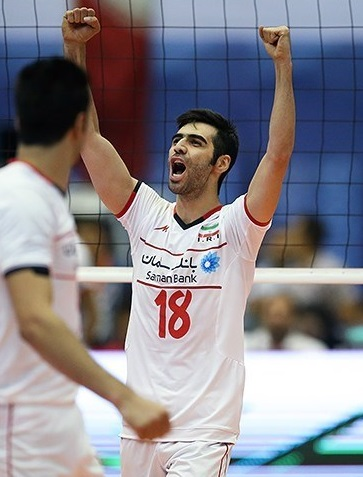

Personal information
- Full name: Mohammad Taher Vadi
- Born: November 10, 1989 (age 36); Mashhad, Iran
- Height: 1.94 m (6 ft 4 in)
- Weight: 85 kg (187 lb)
- Spike: 3.29 m (130 in)
- Block: 3.15 m (124 in)

Volleyball information
- Position: Setter
- Current club: (Iran) Tabiat Eslamshahr
- Number: 18

Career
Years	Teams
2011–2012; 2012–2014; 2014–2015; 2015–2018; 2018–2019; 2019–2020; 2020–	(Iran) Barij Essence Kashan (Italy) Vibo Valentia (Iran) Matin Varamin (Iran) Shahrdari Tabriz (Iran) Khatam Ardakan (Iran) Foolad Sepahan (Iran) Tabiat Eslamshahr

National team
2008–2009; 2012–	Iran U21; Iran
Honours
Representing Iran
Men's volleyball
Asian Championship
Silver medal – second place	2015 Tehran	Team
Silver medal – second place	2023 Urmia	Team
Asian Games
Gold medal – first place	2018 Jakarta–Palembang	Team
Gold medal – first place	2022 Hangzhou	Team
Asian Cup
Gold medal – first place	2016 Nakhon Pathom	Team
Silver medal – second place	2012 Vĩnh Yên	Team

Mohammad Taher Vadi (Persian: محمد طاهر وادی; born 10 October 1989, in Mashhad) is an Iranian volleyball player who plays as a setter for the Iranian national team. He has played for national team in several tournaments like 2012, 2014 and 2016 Asian Cup, 2014 FIVB World Championship qualification tournament and 2015 Asian Championship.

== Honours ==
=== National team ===
- Asian Championship
  - Silver medal (×2): 2015, 2023
- Asian Games
  - Gold medal (×1): 2018
- Asian Cup
  - Gold medal (×1): 2016
  - Silver medal (×1): 2012
- Asian U20 Championship
  - Gold medal (×1): 2008

=== Individual ===
- Best Server: 2012 Asian Cup
- Best Server: 2023 Asian Championship
