= Zhang Jingyin =

Chinese volleyball player (born 1999)

Personal information
- Full name: 张景胤
- Nicknames: Big Pao, Little Sun
- Nationality: Chinese
- Born: 20 December 1999 (age 26) Jiangsu, China
- Home town: Jiangsu, China
- Height: 207 cm (6 ft 9 in)
- Weight: 88 kg (194 lb)
- Spike: 357 cm (141 in)
- Block: 345 cm (136 in)

Volleyball information
- Position: Outsider spiker
- Current club: (Russia) Belogorie Belgorod
- Number: 22 (National Team & Club)

Career
- Years: Team
- 2017–2023: (China) Zhejiang Sports Lottery
- 2023–2023: (Poland) Trefl Gdańsk
- 2023–2025: (Russia) Belogorie Belgorod

National team
- Years: Team
- 2018–present: China
Honours
Men's volleyball
Representing China
FIVB Challenger Cup
Gold medal – first place	2024 Linyi
Asian Championship
Bronze medal – third place	2021 Chiba	Team
Asian Games
Silver medal – second place	2022 Hangzhou	Team
Asian Cup
Gold medal – first place	2022 Nakhon Pathom	Team
World University Games
Bronze medal – third place	2021 Chengdu	Team
- Updated on July, 2023

Zhang Jingyin (Chinese: 张景胤; pinyin: Zhāng Jǐngyìn; born December 12, 1999, in Jiangsu) is a male Chinese volleyball player. He is a member of China men's national volleyball team. On club level he plays for Belogorie Belgorod.

== Career ==
In 2013, Zhang at the age of 14 started learning to play volleyball at Xuzhou Tsinghua Middle School. He was 1.7 meters tall at the time.

In April 2015, Zhang accompanied by his mother, came to the second team of Zhejiang Men's Volleyball Team. And under the recommendation of coach Li Quncheng, Zhang transferred to Xinhe Middle School, a traditional volleyball school that combines physical education and paved the way for him to eventually enter the professional team in Wenling, Zhejiang.

On January 20, 2017, Zhang was selected for the first time in the National Junior Men's Volleyball Team to compete in the 2017 Asian Boys' U19 Volleyball Championship in Myanmar. He is also the team's top scorer, averaging 28.5 points per game and the biggest contributor to win the team's bronze medal.

In August 2017, Zhang with other three players of Zhejiang second team was promoted to Zhejiang's main team after they won as the runners up in the Tianjin National Games.

In 2018, Zhang was selected for the first time as a member of the National Senior Men's Volleyball Team.

In 2025, Belogorie officially terminated its contract with Jingyin Zhang due to his ongoing knee injury and his slow recovery process in China.

== Awards ==
=== Clubs ===
- 2022–2023 Chinese Volleyball League — Bronze medal, with Zhejiang

=== Individual ===
- 2022 Asian Men's Volleyball Cup: Most Valuable Player (MVP) & Best Outside Spiker
- 2022–23 Chinese Men's Volleyball Super League: Best Outside Spiker & Most Popular Player
