= Abdolreza Alizadeh =

Iranian volleyball player

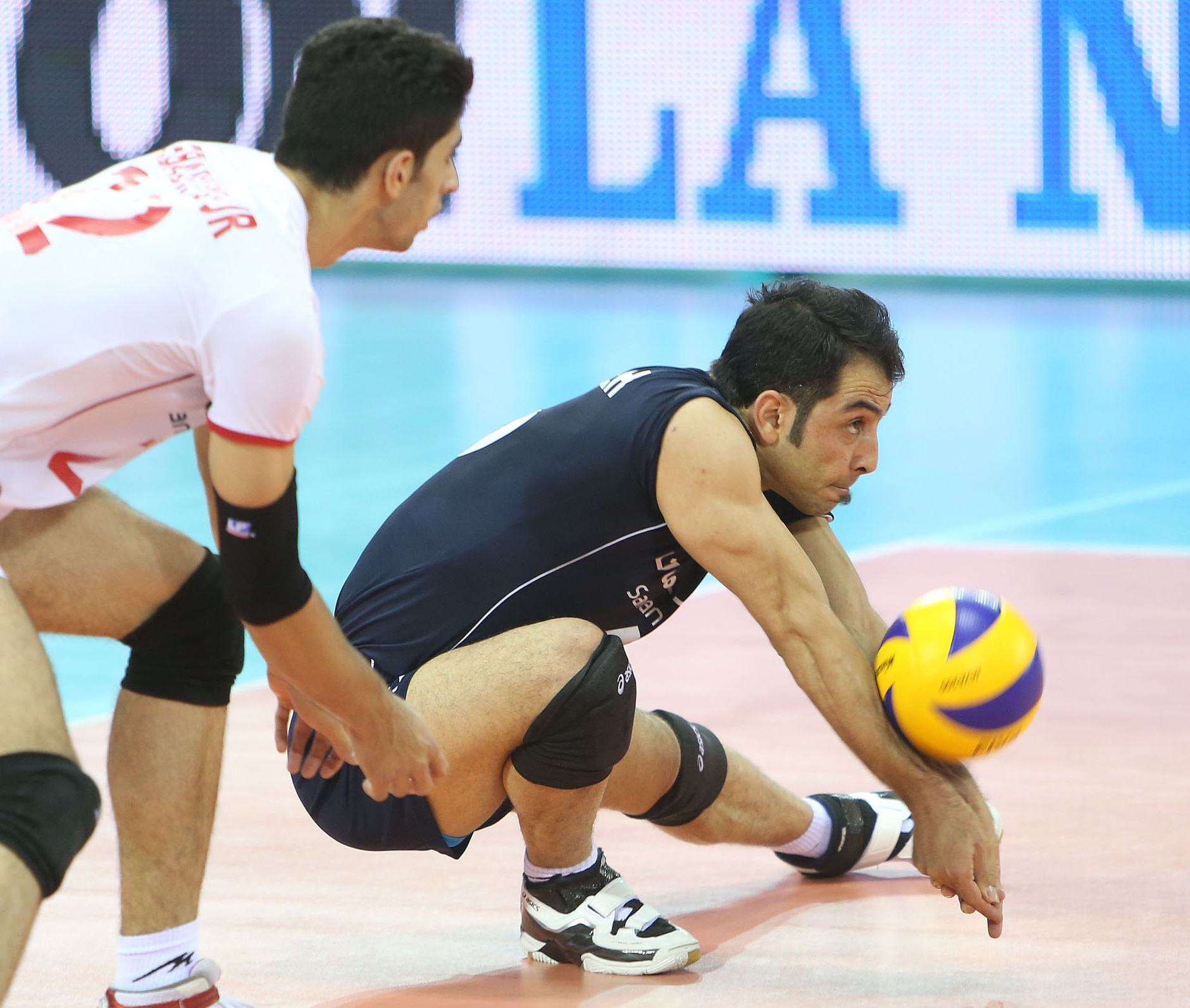

Personal information
- Born: February 19, 1987 (age 39); Urmia, Iran
- Height: 1.83 m (6 ft 0 in)
- Weight: 80 kg (176 lb)
- Spike: 2.72 m (107 in)
- Block: 2.52 m (99 in)

Volleyball information
- Position: Libero
- Current club: (Iran) Haraz Amol
- Number: 16

Career
Teams
	(Iran) Paykan Tehran (Iran) Pegah Urmia (Iran) Foolad Urmia (Iran) Heyat Volleyball Urmia (Iran) Kalleh Mazandaran (Iran) Shahrdari Urmia (Iran) Shahrdari Gonbad (Iran) Haraz Amol

National team
Iran U19; Iran U21; Iran
Honours
Representing Iran
Men's volleyball
Asian Championship
Silver medal – second place	2009 Manila
AVC Cup
Gold medal – first place	2010 Urmia

Abdolreza Alizadeh (Persian: عبدالرضا علیزاده, born 19 February 1987 in Urmia) is a volleyball player from Iran, who plays as a libero for Haraz Amol and the Men's National Team in the 2010 FIVB Men's World Championship and 2014 FIVB Volleyball World League.

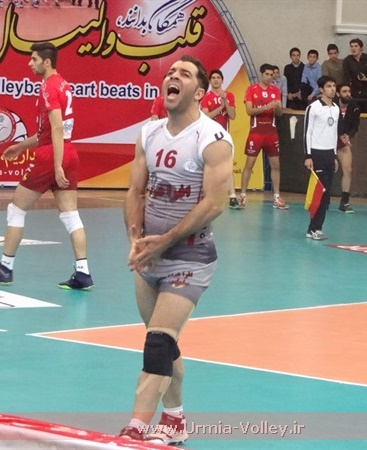
Iran Volleyball Super League Shahrdari Urmia

== Honours ==
=== National team ===
- Asian Championship
  - Silver medal (1): 2009
- AVC Cup
  - Gold medal (1):2010
- World Junior Championship
  - Bronze medal (1): 2007
- Asian Junior Championship
  - Gold medal (1): 2006
- Asian Youth Championship
  - Gold medal (1): 2005

=== Individual ===
- Best libero: 2005 Asian Youth Championship
- Best libero: 2010 AVC Cup
