= AVC Cup for Men =

International indoor volleyball tournament

- Sport: Volleyball
- Founded: 2008; 18 years ago
- First season: 2008
- Folded: 2022
- No. of teams: 12 (Finals)
- Continent: Asia and Oceania (AVC)
- Last champions: China (2nd title)
- Most titles: Iran (3 titles)
- Website: Asian Volleyball Confederation

The AVC Cup for Men, also known as the Asian Men's Volleyball Cup, was an international volleyball competition in Asia and Oceania contested by the top senior men's national teams of the members of Asian Volleyball Confederation, the sport's continent governing body. The tournaments have been awarded every two years since 2008. The champion is China, which won its second title at the 2022 tournament.

The 7 Asian Volleyball Cup tournaments have been won by four different national teams. Iran have won three times. The other Asian Cup winners are China, with two titles; and both South Korea and Qatar, with one title each.

The 2022 Asian Cup was to take place in Taipei, Taiwan, but because of its strict COVID-19 protocols, it was reallocated to Nakhon Pathom, Thailand.

This event should not be confused with the other, continental competition for Asian national volleyball teams, the Asian Volleyball Championship and Asian Volleyball Challenge Cup.

== Results summary ==
| Year | Host | Final | | | 3rd place match | | | Teams |
| Year | Host | Champions | Score | Runners-up | 3rd place | Score | 4th place | Teams |
| 2008; Details | (Thailand); Nakhon Ratchasima | Iran | 3–2 | South Korea | China | 3–0 | Japan | 8 |
| 2010; Details | (Iran); Urmia | Iran | 3–0 | China | India | 3–1 | Chinese Taipei | 8 |
| 2012; Details | (Vietnam); Vĩnh Phúc | China | 3–1 | Iran | Japan | 3–1 | India | 8 |
| 2014; Details | (Kazakhstan); Almaty | South Korea | 3–0 | India | Kazakhstan | 3–1 | Iran | 8 |
| 2016; Details | (Thailand); Nakhon Pathom | Iran | 3–1 | China | Japan | 3–1 | Chinese Taipei | 8 |
| 2018; Details | (Taiwan); Taipei | Qatar | 3–2 | Iran | Japan | 3–2 | Chinese Taipei | 9 |
| 2020 | (Myanmar); Naypyitaw | Cancelled due to COVID-19 pandemic | | | | | | |
| 2022; Details | (Thailand); Nakhon Pathom | China | 3–0 | Japan | Bahrain | 3–0 | South Korea | 11 |

=== Teams reaching the top four ===
| Team | Champions | Runners-up | 3rd place | 4th place |
|---|---|---|---|---|
| Iran | 3 (2008, 2010, 2016) | 2 (2012, 2018) | | 1 (2014) |
| China | 2 (2012, 2022) | 2 (2010, 2016) | 1 (2008) | |
| South Korea | 1 (2014) | 1 (2008) | | 1 (2022) |
| Qatar | 1 (2018) | | | |
| Japan | | 1 (2022) | 3 (2012, 2016, 2018) | 1 (2008) |
| India | | 1 (2014) | 1 (2010) | 1 (2012) |
| Kazakhstan | | | 1 (2014) | |
| Bahrain | | | 1 (2022) | |
| Chinese Taipei | | | | 3 (2010, 2016, 2018) |

=== Champions by region ===
| Federation (Region) | Champion(s) | Number |
|---|---|---|
| CAZVA (Central Asia) | Iran (3) | 3 titles |
| EAZVA (East Asia) | China (2), South Korea (1) | 3 titles |
| WAZVA (West Asia) | Qatar (1) | 1 title |

== Hosts ==
List of hosts by number of cups hosted.

| Times Hosted | Nations | Year(s) |
|---|---|---|
| 3 | Thailand | 2008, 2016, 2022 |
| 1 | Iran | 2010 |
| 1 | Kazakhstan | 2014 |
| 1 | Taiwan | 2018 |
| 1 | Vietnam | 2012 |

== Medal summary ==
| Rank | Nation | Gold | Silver | Bronze | Total |
|---|---|---|---|---|---|
| 1 | Iran | 3 | 2 | 0 | 5 |
| 2 | China | 2 | 2 | 1 | 5 |
| 3 | South Korea | 1 | 1 | 0 | 2 |
| 4 | Qatar | 1 | 0 | 0 | 1 |
| 5 | Japan | 0 | 1 | 3 | 4 |
| 6 | India | 0 | 1 | 1 | 2 |
| 7 | Bahrain | 0 | 0 | 1 | 1 |
| 7 | Kazakhstan | 0 | 0 | 1 | 1 |
| Totals (8 entries) | | 7 | 7 | 7 | 21 |

== Participating nations ==
Legend

- 1st – Champions
- 2nd – Runners-up
- 3rd – Third place
- 4th – Fourth place
- • – Did not enter / Did not qualify
- – Hosts
- Q – Qualified for forthcoming tournament

| Team | (Thailand); 2008 (8) | (Iran); 2010 (8) | (Vietnam); 2012 (8) | (Kazakhstan); 2014 (8) | (Thailand); 2016 (8) | (Taiwan); 2018 (9) | (Thailand); 2022 (11) | Total |
| Australia | 5th | 5th | 7th | 7th | 6th | 6th | 8th | 7 |
| Bahrain | • | • | • | • | • | • | 3rd | 1 |
| China | 3rd | 2nd | 1st | 5th | 2nd | • | 1st | 6 |
| Chinese Taipei | 7th | 4th | • | • | 4th | 4th | 9th | 5 |
| Hong Kong | • | • | • | • | • | • | 11th | 1 |
| India | • | 3rd | 4th | 2nd | • | • | 10th | 4 |
| Indonesia | 8th | • | • | • | • | • | • | 1 |
| Iran | 1st | 1st | 2nd | 4th | 1st | 2nd | 5th | 7 |
| Japan | 4th | 8th | 3rd | 6th | 3rd | 3rd | 2nd | 7 |
| Kazakhstan | • | 7th | • | 3rd | 5th | 7th | • | 4 |
| Myanmar | • | • | 8th | • | • | • | • | 1 |
| Pakistan | • | • | • | • | • | • | 6th | 1 |
| Qatar | • | • | • | • | • | 1st | • | 1 |
| South Korea | 2nd | 6th | 5th | 1st | 8th | 8th | 4th | 7 |
| Thailand | 6th | • | • | 8th | 7th | 5th | 7th | 5 |
| Vietnam | • | • | 6th | • | • | 9th | • | 2 |

=== Debut of teams ===
| Year | Debutants | Total |
|---|---|---|
| 2008 | Australia | 8 |
| 2008 | China | 8 |
| 2008 | Chinese Taipei | 8 |
| 2008 | Indonesia | 8 |
| 2008 | Iran | 8 |
| 2008 | Japan | 8 |
| 2008 | South Korea | 8 |
| 2008 | Thailand | 8 |
| 2010 | India | 2 |
| 2010 | Kazakhstan | 2 |
| 2012 | Myanmar | 2 |
| 2012 | Vietnam | 2 |
| 2014 | None | 0 |
| 2016 | None | 0 |
| 2018 | Qatar | 1 |
| 2022 | Bahrain | 3 |
| 2022 | Hong Kong | 3 |
| 2022 | Pakistan | 3 |

== Awards ==
| Year | Most Valuable Player |
|---|---|
| 2008 | (Iran) Hamzeh Zarini |
| 2010 | (Iran) Farhad Nazari Afshar |
| 2012 | (China) Zhan Guojun |
| 2014 | (South Korea) Seo Jae-duck |
| 2016 | (Iran) Alireza Behboudi |
| 2018 | (Qatar) Mohamed Ibrahim |
| 2022 | (China) Zhang Jingyin |

| Year | Best Setter |
|---|---|
| 2008 | (Thailand) Saranchit Charoensuk |
| 2010 | (Iran) Saeid Marouf |
| 2012 | (Japan) Hideomi Fukatsu |
| 2014 | (South Korea) Han Sun-soo |
| 2016 | (Japan) Shohei Yamaguchi |
| 2018 | (Iran) Javad Karimi |
| 2022 | (Japan) Akihiro Fukatsu |

| Year | Best Outside Spikers |
|---|---|
| 2014 | (India) Sinnadhu Prabagaran |
| 2014 | (Iran) Saeid Shiroud |
| 2016 | (China) Liu Libin |
| 2016 | (Iran) Rahman Davoudi |
| 2018 | (Qatar) Renan Ribeiro |
| 2018 | (Chinese Taipei) Liu Hung-min |
| 2022 | (China) Zhang Jingyin |
| 2022 | (Bahrain) Mohamed Abdulla |

| Year | Best Middle Blockers |
|---|---|
| 2014 | (India) G. R. Vaishnav |
| 2014 | (Iran) Mostafa Sharifat |
| 2016 | (China) Miao Ruantong |
| 2016 | (Iran) Masoud Gholami |
| 2018 | (Qatar) Mohamed Ibrahim |
| 2018 | (Iran) Rahman Taghizadeh |
| 2022 | (China) Zhang Zhejia |
| 2022 | (China) Peng Shikun |

| Year | Best Opposite Spiker |
|---|---|
| 2014 | (South Korea) Seo Jae-duck |
| 2016 | (China) Jiang Chuan |
| 2018 | (Qatar) Mubarak Hammad |
| 2022 | (Japan) Issei Otake |

| Year | Best Libero |
|---|---|
| 2008 | (South Korea) Yeo Oh-hyun |
| 2010 | (Iran) Abdolreza Alizadeh |
| 2012 | (China) Kong Fanwei |
| 2014 | (Kazakhstan) Kairat Baibekov |
| 2016 | (Chinese Taipei) Tung Li-yi |
| 2018 | (Japan) Tomohiro Ogawa |
| 2022 | (Bahrain) Husain Sultan |

== Former awards ==
| Year | Best Scorer |
|---|---|
| 2008 | (Japan) Yasuyuki Shibakoya |
| 2010 | (India) Sanjay Kumar |
| 2012 | (India) Gurinder Singh |

| Year | Best Spiker |
|---|---|
| 2008 | (South Korea) Park Chul-woo |
| 2010 | (China) Cui Jianjun |
| 2012 | (China) Zhong Weijun |

| Tournament | Best Blocker |
|---|---|
| 2010 | (Iran) Alireza Nadi |
| 2012 | (Iran) Alireza Jadidi |

| Tournament | Best Server |
|---|---|
| 2008 | (China) Cui Jianjun |
| 2010 | (Chinese Taipei) Wang Ming-chun |
| 2012 | (Iran) Mohammad Taher Vadi |

| Tournament | Best Digger |
|---|---|
| 2008 | (Chinese Taipei) Chien Wei-lun |

| Tournament | Best Receiver |
|---|---|
| 2008 | (South Korea) Yeo Oh-hyun |

== See also ==
- AVC Cup for Women
- AVC Men's Volleyball Cup
