= Riho Otake =

Japanese volleyball player (born 1993)

Riho Ōtake

Personal information
- Full name: Riho Ōtake
- Nickname: Riho
- Born: December 23, 1993 (age 32); Yokohama, Kanagawa, Japan
- Height: 1.83 m (6 ft 0 in)
- Weight: 65 kg (143 lb)
- Spike: 306 cm (120 in)
- Block: 299 cm (118 in)

Volleyball information
- Position: Middle blocker
- Current club: (Japan) Hisamitsu Springs
- Number: 10

National team
2012–2016	Japan

Riho Otake (大竹 里歩, Ōtake Riho; born December 23, 1993) is a Japanese volleyball player who plays for Hisamitsu Springs. She also plays for the All-Japan women's volleyball team. Her father is Hideyuki Ōtake, who is a former volleyball player. Her younger brother, Issei Otake [大竹壱青], is also a volleyball player and plays for the national men's team as well as Panasonic Panthers.

On 19 December 2011, Denso announced that she was joining the team.

Ōtake played for the All-Japan team for the first time at the 2012 Asian Women's Cup Volleyball Championship in September 2012.

== Clubs ==
- (Japan) ShukutokuSC Junior High
- (Japan) Shimokitazawa Seitoku Highschool
- (Japan) Denso Airybees (2012–2021)
- (Japan) Hisamitsu Springs (2021–present)

== Awards ==
=== Individuals ===
- 2012 - All Japan Highschools championship - Excellent player award

=== Clubs ===
- 2012 - All Japan Highschools championship - Bronze Medal with Shimokitazawa Seitoku Highschool

=== National team ===
- 2013 Asian Championship - Silver medal
