= Hideyuki Otake =

Japanese volleyball player (born 1967)

Hideyuki Ōtake

Personal information
- Born: 16 July 1967 (age 59); Yokohama, Kanagawa, Japan
- Height: 2.08 m (6 ft 10 in)
- Weight: 85 kg (187 lb)
- Spike: 349 cm (11 ft 5 in)
- Block: 335 cm (11 ft 0 in)

Volleyball information
- Position: Middle blocker
- Number: 14

National team
1989–1999	Japan
Honours
Men's volleyball
Representing Japan
Asian Games
Gold medal – first place	1994 Hiroshima	Team
Bronze medal – third place	1990 Beijing	Team

Hideyuki Otake (大竹 秀之, Ōtake Hideyuki; born 16 July 1967) is a Japanese former volleyball player, who played as a middle blocker for the Men's National Team in the 1990s. He competed at the 1992 Summer Olympics in Barcelona, finishing in sixth place.

== Personal life ==
Otake's children, Riho and Issei, are also volleyball players.

== Honours ==
- 1992 Olympic Games — 6th place
- 1998 World Championship — 16th place
