= 2006 Asian Junior Men's Volleyball Championship =

2006 Asian Junior Men's Championship

Tournament details
- Host country: Iran
- Dates: 13–21 September
- Teams: 16
- Venues: 2 (in 1 host city)

Final positions
- Champions: Iran (3rd title)

Tournament awards
- MVP: (Iran) Pouria Fathollahi

The 2006 Asian Junior Men's Volleyball Championship was held in Azadi Sport Complex, Tehran, Iran from 13 September to 21 September 2006.

== Pools composition ==
The teams are seeded based on their final ranking at the 2004 Asian Junior Men's Volleyball Championship.

Pool A	Pool B	Pool C	Pool D
Iran (Host & 2nd)	South Korea (1st)	Qatar (3rd)	Japan (4th)
~~Oman (8th)~~ * Kuwait; Chinese Taipei	Australia (7th); United Arab Emirates; Sri Lanka	China (6th); Bahrain; Indonesia; ~~Iraq~~ *	India (5th); Yemen; Pakistan; Thailand

* Withdrew

== Preliminary round ==
=== Pool A ===
Pos	Team	Pld	W	L	Pts	SW	SL	SR	SPW	SPL	SPR	Qualification
1	Chinese Taipei	1	1	0	2	3	0	MAX	150	66	2.273	Pool E
2	Kuwait	1	0	1	1	0	3	0.000	116	117	0.991	Pool G

Date	Time		Score		Set 1	Set 2	Set 3	Set 4	Set 5	Total
13 Sep	14:30	Chinese Taipei	3–0	Kuwait	25–10	25–13	25–10			75–33

=== Pool B ===
Pos	Team	Pld	W	L	Pts	SW	SL	SR	SPW	SPL	SPR	Qualification
1	Australia	2	2	0	4	6	2	3.000	187	163	1.147	Pool F
2	United Arab Emirates	2	1	1	3	5	5	1.000	217	209	1.038	Pool H
3	Sri Lanka	2	0	2	2	2	6	0.333	154	186	0.828	Pool H

Date	Time		Score		Set 1	Set 2	Set 3	Set 4	Set 5	Total
13 Sep	11:00	Sri Lanka	0–3	Australia	19–25	18–25	20–25			57–75
14 Sep	15:00	Sri Lanka	2–3	United Arab Emirates	26–24	25–22	23–25	12–25	11–15	97–111
15 Sep	09:00	Australia	3–2	United Arab Emirates	23–25	25–23	23–25	25–19	16–14	112–106

=== Pool C ===
Pos	Team	Pld	W	L	Pts	SW	SL	SR	SPW	SPL	SPR	Qualification
1	China	2	2	0	4	6	0	MAX	150	100	1.500	Pool E
2	Bahrain	2	1	1	3	3	5	0.600	164	185	0.886	Pool G
3	Indonesia	2	0	2	2	2	6	0.333	157	186	0.844	Pool G

Date	Time		Score		Set 1	Set 2	Set 3	Set 4	Set 5	Total
13 Sep	17:30	Indonesia	0–3	China	15–25	14–25	18–25			47–75
14 Sep	11:00	Bahrain	3–2	Indonesia	25–22	26–24	21–25	24–26	15–13	111–110
15 Sep	11:00	China	3–0	Bahrain	25–22	25–14	25–17			75–53

=== Pool D ===
Pos	Team	Pld	W	L	Pts	SW	SL	SR	SPW	SPL	SPR	Qualification
1	India	3	3	0	6	9	0	MAX	225	170	1.324	Pool F
2	Pakistan	3	2	1	5	6	3	2.000	211	176	1.199	Pool H
3	Thailand	3	1	2	4	3	6	0.500	174	195	0.892	Pool H
4	Yemen	3	0	3	3	0	9	0.000	156	225	0.693	

Date	Time		Score		Set 1	Set 2	Set 3	Set 4	Set 5	Total
13 Sep	09:00	India	3–0	Yemen	25–17	25–17	25–22			75–59
13 Sep	19:30	Thailand	0–3	Pakistan	16–25	14–25	19–25			49–75
14 Sep	17:00	Thailand	0–3	India	16–25	15–25	19–25			50–75
14 Sep	19:00	Pakistan	3–0	Yemen	25–16	25–16	25–20			75–52
15 Sep	17:00	India	3–0	Pakistan	25–23	25–18	25–21			75–61
15 Sep	19:00	Yemen	0–3	Thailand	11–25	13–25	21–25			45–75

== Quarterfinals ==
- The results and the points of the matches between the same teams that were already played during the preliminary round shall be taken into account for the Quarterfinals.

=== Pool E ===
Pos	Team	Pld	W	L	Pts	SW	SL	SR	SPW	SPL	SPR	Qualification
1	Iran	3	3	0	6	9	3	3.000	284	236	1.203	Championship round
2	Chinese Taipei	3	2	1	5	7	7	1.000	294	311	0.945	Championship round
3	China	3	1	2	4	5	6	0.833	240	247	0.972	5th–8th place
4	Qatar	3	0	3	3	4	9	0.444	280	304	0.921	5th–8th place

Date	Time		Score		Set 1	Set 2	Set 3	Set 4	Set 5	Total
16 Sep	15:00	Qatar	2–3	Chinese Taipei	27–29	25–18	25–22	24–26	11–15	112–110
16 Sep	17:00	Iran	3–0	China	25–17	25–19	25–20			75–56
17 Sep	17:00	Iran	3–1	Chinese Taipei	25–18	22–25	25–18	25–15		97–76
17 Sep	19:00	Qatar	0–3	China	30–32	14–25	20–25			64–82
18 Sep	15:00	Chinese Taipei	3–2	China	21–25	19–25	28–26	25–18	15–8	108–102
18 Sep	17:00	Iran	3–2	Qatar	25–19	20–25	24–26	25–18	18–16	112–104

=== Pool F ===
Pos	Team	Pld	W	L	Pts	SW	SL	SR	SPW	SPL	SPR	Qualification
1	India	3	3	0	6	9	3	3.000	298	262	1.137	Championship round
2	Japan	3	2	1	5	7	5	1.400	281	269	1.045	Championship round
3	South Korea	3	1	2	4	6	6	1.000	262	267	0.981	5th–8th place
4	Australia	3	0	3	3	1	9	0.111	204	247	0.826	5th–8th place

Date	Time		Score		Set 1	Set 2	Set 3	Set 4	Set 5	Total
16 Sep	16:00	South Korea	1–3	India	25–20	19–25	26–28	12–25		82–98
16 Sep	18:00	Japan	3–0	Australia	25–20	25–20	25–21			75–61
17 Sep	10:00	South Korea	3–0	Australia	25–21	25–21	25–17			75–59
17 Sep	15:00	Japan	1–3	India	28–26	21–25	25–27	22–25		96–103
18 Sep	16:00	Australia	1–3	India	15–25	25–22	23–25	21–25		84–97
18 Sep	18:00	South Korea	2–3	Japan	25–23	25–19	21–25	18–25	16–18	105–110

=== Pool G ===
Pos	Team	Pld	W	L	Pts	SW	SL	SR	SPW	SPL	SPR	Qualification
1	Bahrain	2	2	0	4	6	2	3.000	186	164	1.134	9th–12th place
2	Indonesia	2	1	1	3	5	4	1.250	208	178	1.169	9th–12th place
3	Kuwait	2	0	2	2	1	6	0.167	121	173	0.699	13th–15th place

Date	Time		Score		Set 1	Set 2	Set 3	Set 4	Set 5	Total
16 Sep	11:00	Kuwait	1–3	Indonesia	10–25	25–23	15–25	17–25		67–98
18 Sep	11:00	Kuwait	0–3	Bahrain	16–25	20–25	18–25			54–75

=== Pool H ===
Pos	Team	Pld	W	L	Pts	SW	SL	SR	SPW	SPL	SPR	Qualification
1	Pakistan	3	3	0	6	9	2	4.500	259	205	1.263	9th–12th place
2	Thailand	3	2	1	5	6	4	1.500	223	218	1.023	9th–12th place
3	United Arab Emirates	3	1	2	4	6	8	0.750	298	305	0.977	13th–15th place
4	Sri Lanka	3	0	3	3	2	9	0.222	209	261	0.801	13th–15th place

Date	Time		Score		Set 1	Set 2	Set 3	Set 4	Set 5	Total
16 Sep	09:00	United Arab Emirates	1–3	Thailand	20–25	25–23	24–26	22–25		91–99
16 Sep	11:00	Pakistan	3–0	Sri Lanka	25–16	25–21	25–23			75–60
18 Sep	09:00	Sri Lanka	0–3	Thailand	22–25	14–25	16–25			52–75
18 Sep	11:00	United Arab Emirates	2–3	Pakistan	17–25	25–20	26–24	18–25	10–15	96–109

== Final round ==
- The results and the points of the matches between the same teams that were already played during the previous rounds shall be taken into account for the final round.

=== Classification 13th–15th ===
Pos	Team	Pld	W	L	Pts	SW	SL	SR	SPW	SPL	SPR
13	United Arab Emirates	2	2	0	4	6	3	2.000	211	181	1.166
14	Sri Lanka	2	1	1	3	5	4	1.250	193	201	0.960
15	Kuwait	2	0	2	2	2	6	0.333	174	196	0.888

Date	Time		Score		Set 1	Set 2	Set 3	Set 4	Set 5	Total
19 Sep	15:00	Kuwait	1–3	Sri Lanka	20–25	25–20	24–26	21–25		90–96
20 Sep	09:00	Kuwait	1–3	United Arab Emirates	20–25	27–25	22–25	15–25		84–100

=== Classification 9th–12th ===
Pos	Team	Pld	W	L	Pts	SW	SL	SR	SPW	SPL	SPR
9	Pakistan	3	3	0	6	9	0	MAX	225	160	1.406
10	Thailand	3	2	1	5	6	3	2.000	199	187	1.064
11	Bahrain	3	1	2	4	3	8	0.375	212	260	0.815
12	Indonesia	3	0	3	3	2	9	0.222	232	261	0.889

Date	Time		Score		Set 1	Set 2	Set 3	Set 4	Set 5	Total
19 Sep	17:00	Bahrain	0–3	Thailand	21–25	15–25	19–25			55–75
19 Sep	19:00	Pakistan	3–0	Indonesia	25–20	25–22	25–23			75–65
20 Sep	15:00	Bahrain	0–3	Pakistan	16–25	13–25	17–25			46–75
20 Sep	16:00	Indonesia	0–3	Thailand	19–25	20–25	18–25			57–75

=== Classification 5th–8th ===
Pos	Team	Pld	W	L	Pts	SW	SL	SR	SPW	SPL	SPR
5	China	3	3	0	6	9	2	4.500	276	235	1.174
6	South Korea	3	2	1	5	7	3	2.333	246	214	1.150
7	Australia	3	1	2	4	4	7	0.571	231	263	0.878
8	Qatar	3	0	3	3	1	9	0.111	213	254	0.839

Date	Time		Score		Set 1	Set 2	Set 3	Set 4	Set 5	Total
20 Sep	11:00	China	3–1	Australia	19–25	25–15	25–17	25–18		94–75
20 Sep	17:00	South Korea	3–0	Qatar	25–20	25–21	25–14			75–55
21 Sep	09:00	Qatar	1–3	Australia	22–25	25–21	24–26	23–25		94–97
21 Sep	11:00	China	3–1	South Korea	25–23	23–25	25–23	27–25		100–96

=== Championship ===
Pos	Team	Pld	W	L	Pts	SW	SL	SR	SPW	SPL	SPR
1	Iran	3	2	1	5	8	4	2.000	278	240	1.158
2	Japan	3	2	1	5	7	5	1.400	288	273	1.055
3	India	3	2	1	5	6	4	1.500	228	234	0.974
4	Chinese Taipei	3	0	3	3	1	9	0.111	203	250	0.812

Date	Time		Score		Set 1	Set 2	Set 3	Set 4	Set 5	Total
20 Sep	17:00	Iran	2–3	Japan	25–27	19–25	28–26	25–22	9–15	106–115
20 Sep	19:00	India	3–0	Chinese Taipei	25–20	25–19	26–24			76–63
21 Sep	16:00	Chinese Taipei	0–3	Japan	25–27	17–25	22–25			64–77
21 Sep	18:00	Iran	3–0	India	25–15	25–17	25–17			75–49

== Final standing ==
Rank	Team
1st place, gold medalist(s)	Iran
2nd place, silver medalist(s)	Japan
3rd place, bronze medalist(s)	India
4	Chinese Taipei
5	China
6	South Korea
7	Australia
8	Qatar
9	Pakistan
10	Thailand
11	Bahrain
12	Indonesia
13	United Arab Emirates
14	Sri Lanka
15	Kuwait
16	Yemen

Qualified for the 2007 World Junior Championship

2006 Asian Junior Men's champions

Iran
Third title

Team Roster
Saber Narimannejad, Mansour Zadvan, Mohammad Mousavi, Pouria Fathollahi, Abdolreza Alizadeh, Ali Najafi, Mostafa Sharifat, Ali Sajjadi, Arash Keshavarzi, Rahman Davoudi, Ashkan Derakhshan, Yashar Taeihagh

Head Coach: Sergey Gribov

== Awards ==
- MVP: (Iran) Pouria Fathollahi
- Best scorer: (Japan) Hiromitsu Matsuzaki
- Best spiker: (India) Guttikonda Pradeep
- Best blocker: (Iran) Mohammad Mousavi
- Best server: (Iran) Mansour Zadvan
- Best setter: (Japan) Shogo Okamoto
- Best digger: (Japan) Tomohiko Sakanashi
- Best receiver: (Chinese Taipei) Chien Wei-lun
