= Akihiro Fukatsu =

Japanese volleyball player (born 1987)

Personal information
- Nationality: Japanese
- Born: 23 July 1987 (age 39); Hiroshima, Japan
- Height: 183 cm (6 ft 0 in)
- Weight: 68 kg (150 lb)
- Spike: 334 cm (131 in)
- Block: 315 cm (124 in)
- Education: Tokai University

Volleyball information
- Position: Setter
- Current club: (Japan) Tokyo Great Bears
- Number: 3 (National); 3 (Club)

Career
Years	Teams
N/A	(Japan) Seijoh High School
N/A	(Japan) Tokai University
N/A	(Japan) Toyoda Volleyball Club
2013–2021	(Japan) JT Thunders
2021–2023	(Japan) Osaka Blazers Sakai
2023–Present	(Japan) Tokyo Great Bears

National team
2015–2017, 2019, 2022–present	Japan
Medal record
Men's volleyball
Representing Japan
FIVB Nations League
Silver medal – second place	2024 Łódź	Team
Asian Games
Bronze medal – third place	2022 Hangzhou	Team
Asian Cup
Silver medal – second place	2022 Nakhon Pathom	Team

Akihiro Fukatsu (深津 旭弘, Fukatsu Akihiro; born 23 July 1987) is a Japanese male volleyball player. He was part of the Japan men's national volleyball team. On club level, he plays for Tokyo Great Bears.

== Awards ==
=== Individual ===
- V.League 2020–21 season — V.League Honor Award
- 2022 Asian Men's Volleyball Cup - Best Setter

Awards
Preceded by (Iran) Javad Karimi	Best Setter of Asian Volleyball Cup; 2022	Succeeded by TBD
