= Gurinder Singh (volleyball) =

Indian volleyball player (born 1989)

Personal information
- Full name: Gurinder Singh
- Born: 2 March 1989 (age 37); Chandigarh, India
- Height: 195 cm (6 ft 5 in)
- Weight: 86 kg (190 lb)
- Spike: 395 cm (156 in)
- Block: 398 cm (157 in)

Volleyball information
- Position: Universal spiker

Career
Teams
	Sai Nagar Amaravati,

National team
2010 - 2015	India

Gurinder Singh (born 2 March 1989), known as Gurinder is the former captain of India men's national volleyball team. He played for Ahmedabad Defenders in Pro Volleyball League.

== Early life ==
Gurinder Singh was born on 2 March 1989 at Chandigarh, Punjab. Having been noticed by SAI Coach Mohan Nargeta with a talent for volleyball, he started his national career in 2004. Because of his national level recognition, he was rewarded with a job in Punjab Police Department as Officer. His Instagram is shrutx3
