= Kang Young-jun =

South Korean volleyball player (born 1987)

Personal information
- Nationality: South Korean
- Born: 27 February 1987 (age 39); Anyang, Gyeonggi-do
- Hometown: Seoul
- Height: 193 cm (6 ft 4 in)
- Weight: 89 kg (196 lb)
- Spike: 329 cm (130 in)
- Block: 320 cm (126 in)
- Education: Kyonggi University

Volleyball information
- Position: Opposite spiker
- Current club: Uijeongbu KB Stars
- Number: 14

Career
Years	Teams
2009–2013; 2013–2017; 2017–	Woori Capital Dream Six; OK Savings Bank; KB Insurance Stars
Honours
Asian Junior Championship
Gold medal – first place	2004 Doha
Asian Youth Championship
Silver medal – second place	2005 Tehran

Kang Young-jun (Korean: 강영준; born 27 February 1987) is a South Korean male volleyball player. He currently plays for the Uijeongbu KB Insurance Stars.

== Career ==
=== Clubs ===
Kang was selected first overall by the Woori Capital Dream Six in the 2009 V-League Draft.

Kang was drafted to expansion team OK Savings Bank Rush & Cash in the 2013 V-League Expansion Draft. Kang helped the team to win two consecutive championships serving as the backup opposite spiker to Robertlandy Simon.

After the 2016–17 season, Kang was traded to the KB Insurance Stars for Kim Yo-han.

=== National team ===
While attending Inchang High School in Guri, Kang was selected for the South Korean junior national team, which won the 2004 Asian Junior Volleyball Championship in Doha. At the 2005 Asian Youth Volleyball Championship in Tehran, Kang played as the starting opposite spiker and helped Team Korea to the gold medal match, where they lost to Iran. He was named the tournament's "Best Spiker".

As a senior at Kyonggi University in 2009, Kang got called up to the South Korean collegiate national team for the 2009 Summer Universiade in Belgrade, where the team finished in 10th place.

== Individual awards ==
=== National team ===
- 2005 Asian Youth Championship – Best Spiker
