= Mostafa Sharifat =

Iranian volleyball player

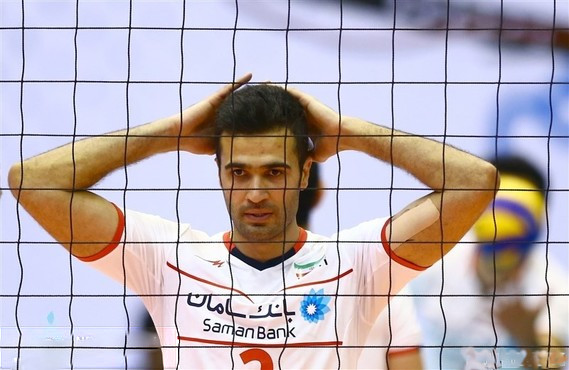

Personal information
- Full name: Mostafa Sharifat
- Born: September 16, 1987 (age 39); Ahvaz, Iran
- Height: 2.01 m (6 ft 7 in)
- Weight: 100 kg (220 lb)
- Spike: 3.48 m (137 in)
- Block: 3.26 m (128 in)

Volleyball information
- Position: Middle Blocker
- Current club: Shahrdari Tabriz

Career
Years	Teams
2004-2010; 2010-2011; 2011-2012; 2012–2015; 2015–2017; 2017–	(Iran) Petrochimi Bandar Emam (Iran) Persepolis (Iran) Shahrdari Tabriz (Iran) Matin Varamin (Iran) Paykan (Iran) Shahrdari Tabriz

National team
2014–	Iran men's national volleyball team
Honours
Representing Iran
Men's volleyball
Asian Championship
Silver medal – second place	2015 Tehran	Team

Mostafa Sharifat (Persian: مصطفی شریفات, born 16 September 1987 in Ahvaz) is an Iranian volleyball player who plays as a middle blocker for the Iran national team. He competed at the 2015 Asian Championship and the 2016 Summer Olympics.

== Honours ==
=== National team ===
- Asian Championship
  - Silver medal (1): 2015
- U21 World Championship
  - Bronze medal (1): 2007
- Asian U20 Championship
  - Gold medal (1): 2006
- Asian U18 Championship
  - Gold medal (1): 2005

=== Club ===
- Asian Championship
  - Gold medal (1): 2014 (Matin)
- Iranian Super League
  - Champions (1): 2014 (Matin)
  - Runners-up (1): 2013 (Matin)

=== Individual ===
- Best Middle Blocker: 2014 Asian Club Championship
- Best Middle Blocker: 2014 Asian Cup
- Best Middle Blocker: 2015 Asian Championship
