= 2016 AVC Cup for Men =

International indoor volleyball tournament

2016 Asian Men's Volleyball Cup
Tournament details
- Host country: Thailand
- City: Nakhon Pathom
- Dates: 22–28 September
- Teams: 8 (from 1 confederation)
- Venue: 1 (in 1 host city)

Final positions
- Champions: Iran (3rd title)
- Runners-up: China
- Third place: Japan
- Fourth place: Chinese Taipei

Tournament awards
- MVP: (Iran) Alireza Behboudi

The 2016 Asian Men's Volleyball Cup, so-called 2016 AVC Cup for Men was the fifth edition of the Asian Men's Volleyball Cup, a biennial international volleyball tournament organised by the Asian Volleyball Confederation (AVC) with Thailand Volleyball Association (TVA). The tournament was held at Nakhon Pathom Gymnasium, Nakhon Pathom, Thailand from 22 to 28 September 2016.

== Pools composition ==
Teams were seeded in the first two positions of each pool following the Serpentine system according to their final standing of the 2015 Asian Championship. AVC reserved the right to seed the hosts as head of Pool A regardless of the final standing of the 2015 Asian Championship. All teams not seeded were drawn. Final standing of the 2015 Asian Championship are shown in brackets except Hosts who ranked 8th.

Pool A	Pool B
Thailand (Hosts); China (3); Qatar (4)*; Chinese Taipei (6)	Japan (1); Iran (2); Australia (5); South Korea (7)

* Kazakhstan replaced Qatar, who withdrew from the tournament.

== Venue ==
All matches
Nakhon Pathom, Thailand
Nakhon Pathom Gymnasium
Capacity: 4,500

== Pool standing procedure ==
1. Number of matches won
2. Match points
3. Sets ratio
4. Points ratio
5. Result of the last match between the tied teams

Match won 3–0 or 3–1: 3 match points for the winner, 0 match points for the loser
Match won 3–2: 2 match points for the winner, 1 match point for the loser

== Preliminary round ==
- All times are Indochina Time (UTC+07:00).

=== Pool A ===
Pos	Team	Pld	W	L	Pts	SW	SL	SR	SPW	SPL	SPR	Qualification
1	China	3	3	0	8	9	2	4.500	261	217	1.203	Quarterfinals
2	Kazakhstan	3	2	1	5	6	6	1.000	271	273	0.993	Quarterfinals
3	Chinese Taipei	3	1	2	4	7	8	0.875	334	339	0.985	Quarterfinals
4	Thailand	3	0	3	1	3	9	0.333	255	292	0.873	Quarterfinals

Date	Time		Score		Set 1	Set 2	Set 3	Set 4	Set 5	Total	Report
22 Sep	16:55	Thailand	2–3	Chinese Taipei	23–25	25–23	20–25	25–22	25–27	118–122	Report
22 Sep	19:45	China	3–0	Kazakhstan	25–23	25–23	25–20			75–66	Report
23 Sep	16:30	Thailand	0–3	China	13–25	18–25	20–25			51–75	Report
23 Sep	19:00	Chinese Taipei	2–3	Kazakhstan	20–25	25–16	27–29	27–25	13–15	112–110	Report
24 Sep	16:40	Kazakhstan	3–1	Thailand	25–22	25–21	20–25	25–18		95–86	Report
24 Sep	19:10	China	3–2	Chinese Taipei	25–14	23–25	23–25	25–23	15–13	111–100	Report

=== Pool B ===
Pos	Team	Pld	W	L	Pts	SW	SL	SR	SPW	SPL	SPR	Qualification
1	Iran	3	3	0	9	9	1	9.000	248	188	1.319	Quarterfinals
2	South Korea	3	2	1	5	6	5	1.200	233	253	0.921	Quarterfinals
3	Japan	3	1	2	4	5	6	0.833	230	227	1.013	Quarterfinals
4	Australia	3	0	3	0	1	9	0.111	211	254	0.831	Quarterfinals

Date	Time		Score		Set 1	Set 2	Set 3	Set 4	Set 5	Total	Report
22 Sep	11:30	Iran	3–1	Australia	25–21	23–25	25–17	25–18		98–81	Report
22 Sep	14:15	Japan	2–3	South Korea	25–19	25–12	22–25	21–25	11–15	104–96	Report
23 Sep	11:40	South Korea	3–0	Australia	26–24	30–28	25–22			81–74	Report
23 Sep	14:10	Japan	0–3	Iran	10–25	18–25	23–25			51–75	Report
24 Sep	11:40	Iran	3–0	South Korea	25–23	25–17	25–16			75–56	Report
24 Sep	14:10	Australia	0–3	Japan	14–25	19–25	23–25			56–75	Report

== Final round ==
- All times are Indochina Time (UTC+07:00).

Quarterfinals
26 September
Iran	3
Thailand	1
26 September
Kazakhstan	1
Japan	3
26 September
China	3
Australia	0
26 September
South Korea	0
Chinese Taipei	3

Semifinals
27 September
Iran	3
Japan	2
27 September
China	3
Chinese Taipei	0

Final
28 September
Iran	3
China	1
3rd place match
28 September
Japan	3
Chinese Taipei	1

5th–8th semifinals
27 September
Thailand	1
Kazakhstan	3
27 September
Australia	3
South Korea	1

5th place match
28 September
Kazakhstan	3
Australia	0
7th place match
28 September
Thailand	3
South Korea	0

=== Quarterfinals ===
Date	Time		Score		Set 1	Set 2	Set 3	Set 4	Set 5	Total	Report
26 Sep	11:40	China	3–0	Australia	25–22	32–30	25–23			82–75	Report
26 Sep	14:10	South Korea	0–3	Chinese Taipei	16–25	17–25	26–28			59–78	Report
26 Sep	16:40	Kazakhstan	1–3	Japan	25–23	19–25	22–25	25–27		91–100	Report
26 Sep	19:10	Iran	3–1	Thailand	25–22	28–30	25–20	25–16		103–88	Report

=== 5th–8th semifinals ===
Date	Time		Score		Set 1	Set 2	Set 3	Set 4	Set 5	Total	Report
27 Sep	11:30	Thailand	1–3	Kazakhstan	25–18	17–25	17–25	23–25		82–93	Report
27 Sep	14:00	Australia	3–1	South Korea	25–23	25–18	25–27	25–19		100–87	Report

=== Semifinals ===
Date	Time		Score		Set 1	Set 2	Set 3	Set 4	Set 5	Total	Report
27 Sep	16:30	Iran	3–2	Japan	25–21	17–25	25–20	23–25	15–11	105–102	Report
27 Sep	19:00	China	3–0	Chinese Taipei	25–23	34–32	25–22			84–77	Report

=== 7th place match ===
Date	Time		Score		Set 1	Set 2	Set 3	Set 4	Set 5	Total	Report
28 Sep	11:40	Thailand	3–0	South Korea	28–26	25–17	25–17			78–60	Report

=== 5th place match ===
Date	Time		Score		Set 1	Set 2	Set 3	Set 4	Set 5	Total	Report
28 Sep	14:10	Kazakhstan	3–0	Australia	25–17	25–20	25–21			75–58	Report

=== 3rd place match ===
Date	Time		Score		Set 1	Set 2	Set 3	Set 4	Set 5	Total	Report
28 Sep	16:40	Japan	3–1	Chinese Taipei	25–18	17–25	28–26	25–12		95–81	Report

=== Final ===
Date	Time		Score		Set 1	Set 2	Set 3	Set 4	Set 5	Total	Report
28 Sep	19:10	Iran	3–1	China	23–25	25–23	25–21	25–21		98–90	Report

== Final standing ==
Rank	Team
1st place, gold medalist(s)	Iran
2nd place, silver medalist(s)	China
3rd place, bronze medalist(s)	Japan
4	Chinese Taipei
5	Kazakhstan
6	Australia
7	Thailand
8	South Korea

2016 Asian Men's Cup champions

Iran
3rd title

14–man roster
Esmaeilnejad, Faezi, Fallah, Shafiei, Amiri, Gholami, Mobasheri, Davoudi, Behboudi (c), Moazzen, Heidari, Ghara, Vadi, Cheperli
Head coach
Shahnazi

== Awards ==
- Most valuable player
  (Iran) Alireza Behboudi
- Best setter
  (Japan) Shohei Yamaguchi
- Best outside spikers
  (China) Liu Libin
  (Iran) Rahman Davoudi
- Best middle blockers
  (China) Miao Ruantong
  (Iran) Masoud Gholami
- Best opposite spiker
  (China) Jiang Chuan
- Best libero
  (Chinese Taipei) Tung Li-yi
