= Kim Gwang-guk =

South Korean volleyball player (born 1987)

Kim Gwang-Guk

Personal information
- Nationality: South Korean
- Born: 13 August 1987 (age 39)
- Height: 188 cm (6 ft 2 in)
- Weight: 77 kg (170 lb)
- Spike: 305 cm (120 in)
- Block: 300 cm (118 in)

Volleyball information
- Number: 3 (national team)

Career
Years	Teams
2015	Woori Card

National team
2015	South Korea

Kim Gwang-Guk (born 13 August 1987) is a South Korean male volleyball player. He is part of the South Korea men's national volleyball team. On club level he plays for Woori Card.
