= 2018 AVC Cup for Men =

International indoor volleyball tournament

2018 Asian Men's Volleyball Cup

Tournament details
- Host country: Taiwan
- City: Taipei
- Dates: 8–15 August
- Teams: 9 (from 1 confederation)
- Venue: 1 (in 1 host city)

Final positions
- Champions: Qatar (1st title)
- Runners-up: Iran
- Third place: Japan
- Fourth place: Chinese Taipei

Tournament awards
- MVP: (Qatar) Mohamed Ibrahim
- Best Setter: (Iran) Javad Karimi
- Best OH: (Qatar) Renan Ribeiro (Chinese Taipei) Liu Hung-min
- Best MB: (Qatar) Mohamed Ibrahim (Iran) Rahman Taghizadeh
- Best OPP: (Qatar) Mubarak Hammad
- Best Libero: (Japan) Tomohiro Ogawa

The 2018 Asian Men's Volleyball Cup, so-called 2018 AVC Cup for Men was the sixth edition of the Asian Men's Volleyball Cup, a biennial international volleyball tournament organised by the Asian Volleyball Confederation (AVC) with Chinese Taipei Volleyball Association (CTVA). The tournament was held at University of Taipei Gymnasium, Taipei, Taiwan (referred to as Chinese Taipei by the AVC) from 8 to 15 August 2018.

As hosts, Chinese Taipei automatically participated for the tournament, while the remaining 8 teams, qualified from the 2017 Asian Men's Volleyball Championship in Gresik, Indonesia.

== Qualification ==
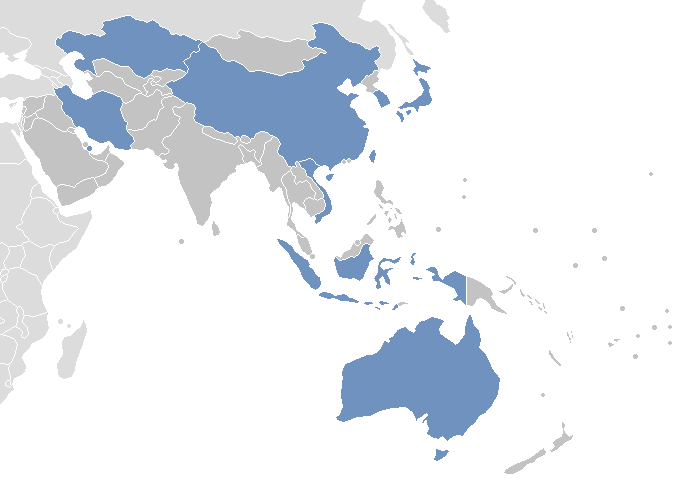
Qualified

The 10 AVC member associations qualified for the 2018 Asian Cup. Chinese Taipei qualified as hosts and the 9 remaining teams qualified from the 2017 Asian Championship. But, China later withdrew. The 9 AVC member associations were from five zonal associations, including, Central Asia (2 teams), East Asia (3 teams), Oceania (1 team), Southeast Asia (2 teams) and West Asia (1 team).

=== Qualified teams ===
The following teams qualified for the tournament.

Means of qualification	Berths	Qualified
Host Country	1	Chinese Taipei
Central Asian teams	2	Iran
Central Asian teams	2	Kazakhstan
East Asian teams	2	~~China~~
East Asian teams	2	Japan
East Asian teams	2	South Korea
Oceanian team	1	Australia
Southeast Asian teams	2	Thailand
Southeast Asian teams	2	Vietnam
West Asian team	1	Qatar
Total 9

== Pools composition ==
This was the first Asian Cup which used the new competition format. Following the 2017 AVC Board of Administration’s unanimous decision, the new format saw teams were drawn into three pools up to the total amount of the participating teams. Each team as well as the hosts was assigned into a pool according to their final standing of the 2017 Asian Championship. As the three best ranked teams were drawn in the same pool A, the next best three contested pool B, the next best three contested pool C. Final standing of the 2017 Asian Championship are shown in brackets.

Pool A	Pool B	Pool C
Japan (1); Kazakhstan (2); South Korea (3)	Iran (5); Chinese Taipei (Hosts, 7); Australia (8)	Qatar (9); Vietnam (10); Thailand (11)

== Venue ==
All matches
Taipei, Taiwan
University of Taipei Gymnasium
Capacity: 4,500

== Pool standing procedure ==
1. Number of matches won
2. Match points
3. Sets ratio
4. Points ratio
5. If the tie continues as per the point ratio between two teams, the priority will be given to the team which won the last match between them. When the tie in points ratio is between three or more teams, a new classification of these teams in the terms of points 1, 2 and 3 will be made taking into consideration only the matches in which they were opposed to each other.

Match won 3–0 or 3–1: 3 match points for the winner, 0 match points for the loser
Match won 3–2: 2 match points for the winner, 1 match point for the loser

== Preliminary round ==
- All times are National Standard Time (UTC+08:00).

=== Pool A ===
Pos	Team	Pld	W	L	Pts	SW	SL	SR	SPW	SPL	SPR	Qualification
1	Kazakhstan	2	2	0	6	6	1	6.000	176	152	1.158	Quarterfinals
2	South Korea	2	1	1	2	3	5	0.600	181	189	0.958	Quarterfinals
3	Japan	2	0	2	1	3	6	0.500	192	208	0.923	Quarterfinals

Date	Time		Score		Set 1	Set 2	Set 3	Set 4	Set 5	Total	Report
8 Aug	13:00	Japan	2–3	South Korea	25–20	19–25	23–25	25–23	17–19	109–112	P2
9 Aug	13:30	Kazakhstan	3–1	Japan	25–22	25–23	21–25	25–13		96–83	P2
10 Aug	16:10	South Korea	0–3	Kazakhstan	22–25	19–25	28–30			69–80	P2

=== Pool B ===
Pos	Team	Pld	W	L	Pts	SW	SL	SR	SPW	SPL	SPR	Qualification
1	Iran	2	2	0	6	6	2	3.000	182	175	1.040	Quarterfinals
2	Chinese Taipei	2	1	1	3	4	3	1.333	167	132	1.265	Playoff
3	Australia	2	0	2	0	1	6	0.167	126	168	0.750	Quarterfinals

Date	Time		Score		Set 1	Set 2	Set 3	Set 4	Set 5	Total	Report
8 Aug	19:20	Iran	3–1	Chinese Taipei	25–23	14–25	25–21	25–23		89–92	P2
9 Aug	18:30	Australia	1–3	Iran	20–25	22–25	25–18	16–25		83–93	P2
10 Aug	18:30	Chinese Taipei	3–0	Australia	25–17	25–14	25–12			75–43	P2

=== Pool C ===
Pos	Team	Pld	W	L	Pts	SW	SL	SR	SPW	SPL	SPR	Qualification
1	Qatar	2	2	0	6	6	0	MAX	150	124	1.210	Quarterfinals
2	Thailand	2	1	1	2	3	5	0.600	172	178	0.966	Playoff
3	Vietnam	2	0	2	1	2	6	0.333	165	185	0.892	Quarterfinals

Date	Time		Score		Set 1	Set 2	Set 3	Set 4	Set 5	Total	Report
8 Aug	15:50	Qatar	3–0	Vietnam	25–20	25–19	25–23			75–62	P2
9 Aug	16:00	Thailand	0–3	Qatar	23–25	23–25	16–25			62–75	P2
10 Aug	13:30	Vietnam	2–3	Thailand	24–26	27–25	25–19	16–25	11–15	103–110	P2

== Final round ==
- All times are National Standard Time (UTC+08:00).

Playoff
11 August
Chinese Taipei	3
Thailand	2

Quarterfinals
11 August
South Korea	0
Qatar	3
11 August
Japan	3
Australia	1
13 August
Kazakhstan	1
Chinese Taipei	3
11 August
Iran	3
Vietnam	0

Semifinals
14 August
Qatar	3
Japan	1
14 August
Chinese Taipei	0
Iran	3

Final
15 August
Qatar	3
Iran	2
3rd place match
15 August
Japan	3
Chinese Taipei	2

5th–9th quarterfinals
South Korea	3
Australia	0
Vietnam	2
Thailand	3

5th–8th semifinals
Australia	3
Kazakhstan	1
Thailand	3
South Korea	1

5th place match
Australia	2
Thailand	3
7th place match
Kazakhstan	3
South Korea	1

=== Playoff ===
Date	Time		Score		Set 1	Set 2	Set 3	Set 4	Set 5	Total	Report
11 Aug	18:30	Chinese Taipei	3–2	Thailand	23–25	25–14	23–25	25–14	15–12	111–90	P2

=== 5th–9th quarterfinals ===
Date	Time		Score		Set 1	Set 2	Set 3	Set 4	Set 5	Total	Report
13 Aug	13:30	South Korea	3–0	Australia	25–23	26–24	25–19			76–66	P2
13 Aug	16:00	Vietnam	2–3	Thailand	18–25	25–18	20–25	39–37	10–15	112–120	P2

=== Quarterfinals ===
Date	Time		Score		Set 1	Set 2	Set 3	Set 4	Set 5	Total	Report
11 Aug	11:00	Iran	3–0	Vietnam	25–19	25–14	25–19			75–52	P2
11 Aug	13:30	Japan	3–1	Australia	25–21	25–17	21–25	25–15		96–78	P2
11 Aug	16:00	South Korea	0–3	Qatar	19–25	14–25	22–25			55–75	P2
13 Aug	18:45	Kazakhstan	1–3	Chinese Taipei	25–23	20–25	20–25	21–25		86–98	P2

=== 5th–8th semifinals ===
Date	Time		Score		Set 1	Set 2	Set 3	Set 4	Set 5	Total	Report
14 Aug	11:00	Australia	3–1	Kazakhstan	25–19	25–18	23–25	25–16		98–78	P2
14 Aug	13:30	Thailand	3–1	South Korea	25–23	27–25	21–25	25–16		98–89	P2

=== Semifinals ===
Date	Time		Score		Set 1	Set 2	Set 3	Set 4	Set 5	Total	Report
14 Aug	16:00	Qatar	3–1	Japan	25–21	22–25	25–19	25–16		97–81	P2
14 Aug	18:30	Chinese Taipei	0–3	Iran	19–25	20–25	23–25			62–75	P2

=== 7th place match ===
Date	Time		Score		Set 1	Set 2	Set 3	Set 4	Set 5	Total	Report
15 Aug	11:00	Kazakhstan	3–1	South Korea	25–21	25–23	14–25	25–19		89–88	P2

=== 5th place match ===
Date	Time		Score		Set 1	Set 2	Set 3	Set 4	Set 5	Total	Report
15 Aug	13:30	Australia	2–3	Thailand	25–21	27–25	16–25	17–25	5–15	90–111	P2

=== 3rd place match ===
Date	Time		Score		Set 1	Set 2	Set 3	Set 4	Set 5	Total	Report
15 Aug	16:10	Japan	3–2	Chinese Taipei	21–25	20–25	32–30	29–27	17–15	119–122	P2

=== Final ===
Date	Time		Score		Set 1	Set 2	Set 3	Set 4	Set 5	Total	Report
15 Aug	19:15	Qatar	3–2	Iran	23–25	21–25	25–22	25–18	15–10	109–100	P2

== Final standing ==
Rank	Team
1st place, gold medalist(s)	Qatar
2nd place, silver medalist(s)	Iran
3rd place, bronze medalist(s)	Japan
4	Chinese Taipei
5	Thailand
6	Australia
7	Kazakhstan
8	South Korea
9	Vietnam

2018 Asian Men's Cup champions

Qatar
1st title

14–man roster
Ibrahim (c), M. Essam, Renan, Sultan, Sulaiman, Belal, Miloš, Ababacar, Nikola, Mubarak, Osman, Ali, Ahmed G., Khaled
Head coach
Soto

== Awards ==
- Most valuable player
  (Qatar) Mohamed Ibrahim
- Best setter
  (Iran) Javad Karimi
- Best outside spikers
  (Qatar) Renan Ribeiro
  (Chinese Taipei) Liu Hung-min
- Best middle blockers
  (Qatar) Mohamed Ibrahim
  (Iran) Rahman Taghizadeh
- Best opposite spiker
  (Qatar) Mubarak Hammad
- Best libero
  (Japan) Tomohiro Ogawa

== See also ==
- 2018 Asian Women's Volleyball Cup
- 2018 Asian Men's Volleyball Challenge Cup
- List of sporting events in Taiwan
