= 2015 Asian Men's Volleyball Championship =

International volleyball tournament

- Tehran 2015 Official Logo

Tournament details
- Host country: Iran
- City: Tehran
- Dates: 31 July – 8 August
- Teams: 16
- Venues: 2 (in 1 host city)

Final positions
- Champions: Japan (8th title)
- Runners-up: Iran
- Third place: China
- Fourth place: Qatar

Tournament awards
- MVP: (Japan) Kunihiro Shimizu

The Asian Men's Volleyball Championship was the eighteenth staging of the Asian Men's Volleyball Championship, a biennial international volleyball tournament organised by the Asian Volleyball Confederation (AVC) with Islamic Republic of Iran Volleyball Federation (IRIVF). The tournament was held in Tehran, Iran from 31 July to 8 August 2015.

== Qualification ==
If there are not more than 16 teams, all teams will compete in the tournament.
If there are more than 16 teams, participating teams are:
– The host nation
– Top 10 ranked teams from the previous edition
– Representatives from each of the five Asian Volleyball Confederation Zonal Associations

There are 17 teams applied for the competition. But all teams can participate in the tournament.

Central Asia	Eastern Asia	Oceania	Southeastern Asia	Western Asia
Iran; India; Kazakhstan; Pakistan; Sri Lanka; Turkmenistan	China; Chinese Taipei; Japan; South Korea	Australia	Thailand	Bahrain; Kuwait; Oman; Qatar; Saudi Arabia

== Pools composition ==
Teams were seeded in the first two positions of each pool following the serpentine system according to their FIVB World Ranking as of 22 September 2014. AVC reserved the right to seed the hosts as head of pool A regardless of the World Ranking. All teams not seeded were drawn in Tehran, Iran on 22 April 2015. But, Saudi Arabia later withdrew and Oman moved from pool A to C to balance the number of teams in each pool. Rankings are shown in brackets except the hosts who ranked 10th.

Pool A	Pool B	Pool C	Pool D
Iran (Hosts)	Australia (13)	South Korea (16)	China (17)
Kazakhstan (42)	India (39)	Thailand (36)	Japan (21)
Kuwait (56)	Turkmenistan (141)	Pakistan (52)	Sri Lanka (68)
~~Oman (138)~~	Qatar (45)	~~Saudi Arabia (56)~~	Bahrain (42)
Chinese Taipei (45)		Oman (138)	

== Venues ==
Preliminary round, Pool E, F and Final eight	Preliminary round, Pool G, H and Final round
Tehran, Iran
Azadi Indoor Stadium	Azadi Volleyball Hall
Capacity: 12,000	Capacity: 3,000

== Pool standing procedure ==
1. Number of matches won
2. Match points
3. Points ratio
4. Sets ratio
5. Result of the last match between the tied teams

Match won 3–0 or 3–1: 3 match points for the winner, 0 match points for the loser
Match won 3–2: 2 match points for the winner, 1 match point for the loser

== Preliminary round ==
- All times are Iran Daylight Time (UTC+04:30).

=== Pool A ===
Pos	Team	Pld	W	L	Pts	SPW	SPL	SPR	SW	SL	SR	Qualification
1	Iran	3	3	0	9	227	163	1.393	9	0	MAX	Final eight (Pools E and F)
2	Chinese Taipei	3	2	1	6	228	222	1.027	6	4	1.500	Final eight (Pools E and F)
3	Kazakhstan	3	1	2	3	229	231	0.991	4	6	0.667	9th–16th places (Pools G and H)
4	Kuwait	3	0	3	0	160	228	0.702	0	9	0.000	9th–16th places (Pools G and H)

Date	Time	Venue		Score		Set 1	Set 2	Set 3	Set 4	Set 5	Total	Report
31 Jul	13:00	AVH	Chinese Taipei	3–1	Kazakhstan	25–22	24–26	25–21	25–21		99–90	Report
31 Jul	19:00	AIS	Kuwait	0–3	Iran	13–25	22–25	13–25			48–75	Report
1 Aug	15:00	AVH	Chinese Taipei	3–0	Kuwait	28–26	25–17	25–14			78–57	Report
1 Aug	19:00	AIS	Kazakhstan	0–3	Iran	23–25	16–25	25–27			64–77	Report
2 Aug	17:00	AVH	Kazakhstan	3–0	Kuwait	25–17	25–20	25–18			75–55	Report
2 Aug	19:00	AIS	Iran	3–0	Chinese Taipei	25–16	25–16	25–19			75–51	Report

=== Pool B ===
Pos	Team	Pld	W	L	Pts	SPW	SPL	SPR	SW	SL	SR	Qualification
1	Qatar	3	3	0	9	279	228	1.224	9	2	4.500	Final eight (Pools E and F)
2	Australia	3	2	1	6	244	211	1.156	7	3	2.333	Final eight (Pools E and F)
3	India	3	1	2	3	190	217	0.876	3	6	0.500	9th–16th places (Pools G and H)
4	Turkmenistan	3	0	3	0	196	253	0.775	1	9	0.111	9th–16th places (Pools G and H)

Date	Time	Venue		Score		Set 1	Set 2	Set 3	Set 4	Set 5	Total	Report
31 Jul	15:00	AVH	India	3–0	Turkmenistan	27–25	25–21	25–21			77–67	Report
31 Jul	17:00	AVH	Qatar	3–1	Australia	25–22	28–30	25–22	25–20		103–94	Report
1 Aug	13:00	AIS	Turkmenistan	0–3	Australia	11–25	21–25	22–25			54–75	Report
1 Aug	17:00	AVH	India	0–3	Qatar	18–25	19–25	22–25			59–75	Report
2 Aug	13:00	AVH	Turkmenistan	1–3	Qatar	14–25	28–26	13–25	20–25		75–101	Report
2 Aug	15:00	AVH	Australia	3–0	India	25–19	25–19	25–16			75–54	Report

=== Pool C ===
Pos	Team	Pld	W	L	Pts	SPW	SPL	SPR	SW	SL	SR	Qualification
1	South Korea	3	3	0	8	265	220	1.205	9	2	4.500	Final eight (Pools E and F)
2	Thailand	3	2	1	5	328	308	1.065	8	7	1.143	Final eight (Pools E and F)
3	Pakistan	3	1	2	4	229	246	0.931	5	6	0.833	9th–16th places (Pools G and H)
4	Oman	3	0	3	1	219	267	0.820	2	9	0.222	9th–16th places (Pools G and H)

Date	Time	Venue		Score		Set 1	Set 2	Set 3	Set 4	Set 5	Total	Report
31 Jul	13:00	AIS	Oman	0–3	South Korea	19–25	17–25	27–29			63–79	Report
31 Jul	15:00	AIS	Pakistan	2–3	Thailand	25–23	25–20	23–25	18–25	13–15	104–108	Report
1 Aug	13:00	AVH	Oman	0–3	Pakistan	23–25	21–25	19–25			63–75	Report
1 Aug	15:00	AIS	South Korea	3–2	Thailand	26–24	21–25	24–26	25–21	15–11	111–107	Report
2 Aug	13:00	AIS	South Korea	3–0	Pakistan	25–21	25–12	25–17			75–50	Report
2 Aug	15:00	AIS	Thailand	3–2	Oman	25–27	25–20	23–25	25–11	15–10	113–93	Report

=== Pool D ===
Pos	Team	Pld	W	L	Pts	SPW	SPL	SPR	SW	SL	SR	Qualification
1	China	3	3	0	9	248	199	1.246	9	1	9.000	Final eight (Pools E and F)
2	Japan	3	2	1	6	256	234	1.094	7	4	1.750	Final eight (Pools E and F)
3	Bahrain	3	1	2	3	196	210	0.933	3	6	0.500	9th–16th places (Pools G and H)
4	Sri Lanka	3	0	3	0	189	246	0.768	1	9	0.111	9th–16th places (Pools G and H)

Date	Time	Venue		Score		Set 1	Set 2	Set 3	Set 4	Set 5	Total	Report
31 Jul	17:00	AIS	China	3–0	Sri Lanka	25–11	25–22	25–20			75–53	Report
31 Jul	19:00	AVH	Japan	3–0	Bahrain	26–24	25–12	25–23			76–59	Report
1 Aug	17:00	AIS	China	3–1	Japan	25–20	25–17	23–25	25–22		98–84	Report
1 Aug	19:00	AVH	Sri Lanka	0–3	Bahrain	21–25	22–25	16–25			59–75	Report
2 Aug	17:00	AIS	Bahrain	0–3	China	18–25	23–25	21–25			62–75	Report
2 Aug	19:00	AVH	Sri Lanka	1–3	Japan	16–25	25–21	16–25	20–25		77–96	Report

== Classification round ==
- All times are Iran Daylight Time (UTC+04:30).
- The results and the points of the matches between the same teams that were already played during the preliminary round shall be taken into account for the classification round.

=== Pool E ===
Pos	Team	Pld	W	L	Pts	SPW	SPL	SPR	SW	SL	SR	Qualification
1	South Korea	3	3	0	8	281	253	1.111	9	3	3.000	Quarterfinals
2	Iran	3	2	1	6	244	197	1.239	7	3	2.333	Quarterfinals
3	Chinese Taipei	3	1	2	3	178	214	0.832	3	6	0.500	Quarterfinals
4	Thailand	3	0	3	1	222	261	0.851	2	9	0.222	Quarterfinals

Date	Time		Score		Set 1	Set 2	Set 3	Set 4	Set 5	Total	Report
3 Aug	13:00	South Korea	3–0	Chinese Taipei	25–15	25–20	25–17			75–52	Report
3 Aug	19:00	Iran	3–0	Thailand	25–20	25–11	25–20			75–51	Report
4 Aug	13:00	Chinese Taipei	3–0	Thailand	25–22	25–20	25–22			75–64	Report
4 Aug	19:00	Iran	1–3	South Korea	25–17	26–28	20–25	23–25		94–95	Report

=== Pool F ===
Pos	Team	Pld	W	L	Pts	SPW	SPL	SPR	SW	SL	SR	Qualification
1	China	3	3	0	8	273	247	1.105	9	3	3.000	Quarterfinals
2	Qatar	3	2	1	6	299	300	0.997	8	6	1.333	Quarterfinals
3	Australia	3	1	2	3	260	269	0.967	4	7	0.571	Quarterfinals
4	Japan	3	0	3	1	281	297	0.946	4	9	0.444	Quarterfinals

Date	Time		Score		Set 1	Set 2	Set 3	Set 4	Set 5	Total	Report
3 Aug	15:00	Qatar	3–2	Japan	25–19	25–23	15–25	19–25	17–15	101–107	Report
3 Aug	17:00	China	3–0	Australia	25–23	25–21	26–24			76–68	Report
4 Aug	15:00	Australia	3–1	Japan	23–25	25–21	25–23	25–21		98–90	Report
4 Aug	17:00	Qatar	2–3	China	25–17	16–25	25–17	19–25	10–15	95–99	Report

=== Pool G ===
Pos	Team	Pld	W	L	Pts	SPW	SPL	SPR	SW	SL	SR	Qualification
1	Kazakhstan	3	3	0	8	274	241	1.137	9	3	3.000	9th–12th semifinals
2	Pakistan	3	2	1	6	281	269	1.045	8	5	1.600	9th–12th semifinals
3	Kuwait	3	1	2	4	255	273	0.934	5	7	0.714	13th–16th semifinals
4	Oman	3	0	3	0	241	268	0.899	2	9	0.222	13th–16th semifinals

Date	Time		Score		Set 1	Set 2	Set 3	Set 4	Set 5	Total	Report
3 Aug	13:00	Kazakhstan	3–1	Oman	25–22	25–23	20–25	25–17		95–87	Report
3 Aug	15:00	Pakistan	3–2	Kuwait	25–19	25–23	21–25	21–25	15–10	107–102	Report
4 Aug	13:00	Kuwait	3–1	Oman	25–22	23–25	25–21	25–23		98–91	Report
4 Aug	15:00	Kazakhstan	3–2	Pakistan	21–25	25–20	18–25	25–17	15–12	104–99	Report

=== Pool H ===
Pos	Team	Pld	W	L	Pts	SPW	SPL	SPR	SW	SL	SR	Qualification
1	Bahrain	3	3	0	8	249	227	1.097	9	2	4.500	9th–12th semifinals
2	India	3	2	1	7	254	221	1.149	8	3	2.667	9th–12th semifinals
3	Sri Lanka	3	1	2	3	217	236	0.919	3	7	0.429	13th–16th semifinals
4	Turkmenistan	3	0	3	0	219	255	0.859	1	9	0.111	13th–16th semifinals

Date	Time		Score		Set 1	Set 2	Set 3	Set 4	Set 5	Total	Report
3 Aug	17:00	India	3–0	Sri Lanka	25–17	25–22	25–20			75–59	Report
3 Aug	19:00	Bahrain	3–0	Turkmenistan	29–27	25–17	25–22			79–66	Report
4 Aug	17:00	Turkmenistan	1–3	Sri Lanka	19–25	18–25	26–24	23–25		86–99	Report
4 Aug	19:00	India	2–3	Bahrain	16–25	25–15	25–14	22–25	14–16	102–95	Report

== Final round ==
- All times are Iran Daylight Time (UTC+04:30).

=== 13th–16th places ===
13th–16th semifinals
6 August
Kuwait	3
Turkmenistan	1
6 August
Sri Lanka	3
Oman	1

13th place match
7 August
Kuwait	0
Sri Lanka	3
15th place match
7 August
Turkmenistan	2
Oman	3

==== 13th–16th semifinals ====
Date	Time		Score		Set 1	Set 2	Set 3	Set 4	Set 5	Total	Report
6 Aug	13:00	Kuwait	3–1	Turkmenistan	23–25	25–20	25–19	27–25		100–89	Report
6 Aug	15:00	Sri Lanka	3–1	Oman	25–22	25–19	21–25	25–14		96–80	Report

==== 15th place match ====
Date	Time		Score		Set 1	Set 2	Set 3	Set 4	Set 5	Total	Report
7 Aug	13:00	Turkmenistan	2–3	Oman	25–22	26–24	19–25	28–30	10–15	108–116	Report

==== 13th place match ====
Date	Time		Score		Set 1	Set 2	Set 3	Set 4	Set 5	Total	Report
7 Aug	15:00	Kuwait	0–3	Sri Lanka	26–28	17–25	14–25			57–78	Report

=== 9th–12th places ===
9th–12th semifinals
6 August
Kazakhstan	3
India	1
6 August
Bahrain	2
Pakistan	3

9th place match
7 August
Kazakhstan	3
Pakistan	0
11th place match
7 August
India	3
Bahrain	2

==== 9th–12th semifinals ====
Date	Time		Score		Set 1	Set 2	Set 3	Set 4	Set 5	Total	Report
6 Aug	17:00	Kazakhstan	3–1	India	25–15	26–24	30–32	25–21		106–92	Report
6 Aug	19:00	Bahrain	2–3	Pakistan	25–21	20–25	25–27	25–15	9–15	104–103	Report

==== 11th place match ====
Date	Time		Score		Set 1	Set 2	Set 3	Set 4	Set 5	Total	Report
7 Aug	17:00	India	3–2	Bahrain	18–25	25–23	25–13	18–25	15–13	101–99	Report

==== 9th place match ====
Date	Time		Score		Set 1	Set 2	Set 3	Set 4	Set 5	Total	Report
7 Aug	19:00	Kazakhstan	3–0	Pakistan	25–22	25–19	25–22			75–63	Report

=== Final eight ===
Quarterfinals
6 August
China	3
Thailand	0
6 August
Iran	3
Australia	1
6 August
South Korea	2
Japan	3
6 August
Qatar	3
Chinese Taipei	1

Semifinals
7 August
China	2
Iran	3
7 August
Japan	3
Qatar	1

Final
8 August
Iran	1
Japan	3
3rd place match
8 August
China	3
Qatar	2

5th–8th semifinals
7 August
Thailand	0
Australia	3
7 August
South Korea	1
Chinese Taipei	3

5th place match
8 August
Australia	3
Chinese Taipei	1
7th place match
8 August
Thailand	0
South Korea	3

==== Quarterfinals ====
Date	Time	Venue		Score		Set 1	Set 2	Set 3	Set 4	Set 5	Total	Report
6 Aug	13:00	AIS	South Korea	2–3	Japan	23–25	16–25	25–20	25–15	13–15	102–100	Report
6 Aug	15:00	AIS	China	3–0	Thailand	25–20	27–25	30–28			82–73	Report
6 Aug	17:00	AIS	Qatar	3–1	Chinese Taipei	25–20	25–19	17–25	25–22		92–86	Report
6 Aug	19:00	AIS	Iran	3–1	Australia	25–20	14–25	25–18	25–20		89–83	Report

==== 5th–8th semifinals ====
Date	Time	Venue		Score		Set 1	Set 2	Set 3	Set 4	Set 5	Total	Report
7 Aug	13:00	AIS	Thailand	0–3	Australia	14–25	22–25	16–25			52–75	Report
7 Aug	15:00	AIS	South Korea	1–3	Chinese Taipei	25–21	15–25	19–25	16–25		75–96	Report

==== Semifinals ====
Date	Time	Venue		Score		Set 1	Set 2	Set 3	Set 4	Set 5	Total	Report
7 Aug	17:00	AIS	Japan	3–1	Qatar	22–25	25–23	25–17	25–23		97–88	Report
7 Aug	19:00	AIS	China	2–3	Iran	25–21	25–20	9–25	19–25	14–16	92–107	Report

==== 7th place match ====
Date	Time	Venue		Score		Set 1	Set 2	Set 3	Set 4	Set 5	Total	Report
8 Aug	13:00	AVH	Thailand	0–3	South Korea	22–25	18–25	22–25			62–75	Report

==== 5th place match ====
Date	Time	Venue		Score		Set 1	Set 2	Set 3	Set 4	Set 5	Total	Report
8 Aug	15:00	AVH	Australia	3–1	Chinese Taipei	32–30	25–15	21–25	25–22		103–92	Report

==== 3rd place match ====
Date	Time	Venue		Score		Set 1	Set 2	Set 3	Set 4	Set 5	Total	Report
8 Aug	15:00	AIS	China	3–2	Qatar	25–23	25–19	21–25	24–26	15–9	110–102	Report

==== Final ====
Date	Time	Venue		Score		Set 1	Set 2	Set 3	Set 4	Set 5	Total	Report
8 Aug	17:30	AIS	Iran	1–3	Japan	17–25	22–25	25–18	22–25		86–93	Report

== Final standing ==
Rank	Team
1st place, gold medalist(s)	Japan
2nd place, silver medalist(s)	Iran
3rd place, bronze medalist(s)	China
4	Qatar
5	Australia
6	Chinese Taipei
7	South Korea
8	Thailand
9	Kazakhstan
10	Pakistan
11	India
12	Bahrain
13	Sri Lanka
14	Kuwait
15	Oman
16	Turkmenistan

2015 Asian Men's champions

Japan
8th title

12–man roster
Kunihiro Shimizu (c), Daisuke Sakai, Yuta Matsuoka, Yoshifumi Suzuki, Akihiro Fukatsu, Masashi Kuriyama, Akihiro Yamauchi, Hideomi Fukatsu, Masahiro Yanagida, Takashi Dekita, Yuta Yoneyama, Hiroaki Asano
Head coach
Masashi Nambu

== Awards ==
- Most valuable player
  (Japan) Kunihiro Shimizu
- Best setter
  (Japan) Hideomi Fukatsu
- Best outside spikers
  (Iran) Purya Fayazi
  (Iran) Hamzeh Zarini
- Best middle blockers
  (China) Zhang Zhejia
  (Iran) Mostafa Sharifat
- Best opposite spiker
  (Iran) Farhad Piroutpour
- Best libero
  (Japan) Daisuke Sakai

== See also ==
- 2015 Asian Women's Volleyball Championship
