= 2017 FIVB Volleyball Men's U21 World Championship squads =

This article shows the rosters of all participating teams at the 2017 FIVB Volleyball Men's U21 World Championship in Czech Republic.

== Argentina ==
The following is the Argentine roster in the 2017 FIVB Volleyball Men's U21 World Championship.

Head coach: Alejandro Grossi

No.	Name	Date of birth	Height	Weight	Spike	Block	2017 club
1	Santiago Arroyo	10 August 1999	1.73 m (5 ft 8 in)	75 kg (165 lb)	305 cm (120 in)	290 cm (110 in)	(Argentina) Club de Amigos
2	Gerónimo Elgueta	19 July 1997	1.83 m (6 ft 0 in)	79 kg (174 lb)	328 cm (129 in)	315 cm (124 in)	(Argentina) Obras Pocito
3	Jan Martinez Franchi	28 January 1998	1.90 m (6 ft 3 in)	85 kg (187 lb)	333 cm (131 in)	316 cm (124 in)	(Argentina) Club Ciudad de Buenos Aires
4	Sergio Soria	20 April 1997	1.96 m (6 ft 5 in)	90 kg (200 lb)	335 cm (132 in)	315 cm (124 in)	(Argentina) Club Ciudad de Buenos Aires
7	Matias Giraudo	13 March 1998	1.96 m (6 ft 5 in)	85 kg (187 lb)	330 cm (130 in)	315 cm (124 in)	(Argentina) Club Atlético River Plate
9	Felipe Benavidez	31 January 1997	1.92 m (6 ft 4 in)	83 kg (183 lb)	330 cm (130 in)	315 cm (124 in)	(Argentina) Club Ciudad de Buenos Aires
10	Liam Ernesto Arreche	30 December 1997	1.94 m (6 ft 4 in)	92 kg (203 lb)	339 cm (133 in)	320 cm (130 in)	(Argentina) Club de Amigos
11	Juan Horacio Bucciarelli	26 November 1997	1.93 m (6 ft 4 in)	86 kg (190 lb)	336 cm (132 in)	315 cm (124 in)	(Argentina) CoDeBa de San Juan
12	Manuel Balague	12 August 1998	1.90 m (6 ft 3 in)	85 kg (187 lb)	332 cm (131 in)	317 cm (125 in)	(Argentina) Club Atlético River Plate
13	Agustín Loser	12 October 1997	1.93 m (6 ft 4 in)	77 kg (170 lb)	335 cm (132 in)	310 cm (120 in)	(Argentina) Club Ciudad de Buenos Aires
15	Ignacio Roberts (C)	28 July 1997	1.82 m (6 ft 0 in)	78 kg (172 lb)	315 cm (124 in)	295 cm (116 in)	(Argentina) Club Ciudad de Buenos Aires
19	Luciano Palonsky	8 July 1999	1.98 m (6 ft 6 in)	72 kg (159 lb)	330 cm (130 in)	310 cm (120 in)	(Argentina) Club Ciudad de Buenos Aires

== Brazil ==
The following is the Brazilian roster in the 2017 FIVB Volleyball Men's U21 World Championship.

Head coach: Tambeiro Nery Pereira Jr.

No.	Name	Date of birth	Height	Weight	Spike	Block	2017 club
3	Davy Moraes	4 April 1997	1.99 m (6 ft 6 in)	93 kg (205 lb)	.353 cm (139 in)	330 cm (130 in)	(Brazil) Minas Tênis Clube
4	Felipe Roque	19 May 1997	2.05 m (6 ft 9 in)	94 kg (207 lb)	355 cm (140 in)	335 cm (132 in)	(Brazil) Minas Tênis Clube
5	Matheus Silva (C)	1 April 1997	1.78 m (5 ft 10 in)	86 kg (190 lb)	312 cm (123 in)	290 cm (110 in)	(Brazil) São Bernardo Vôlei
8	Henrique Honorato	18 March 1997	1.90 m (6 ft 3 in)	85 kg (187 lb)	335 cm (132 in)	310 cm (120 in)	(Brazil) Minas Tênis Clube
9	Victor Cardoso	22 March 1999	1.99 m (6 ft 6 in)	86 kg (190 lb)	334 cm (131 in)	325 cm (128 in)	(Brazil) SESI São Paulo
11	Daniel Mascarenhas	13 April 1997	2.02 m (6 ft 8 in)	91 kg (201 lb)	342 cm (135 in)	317 cm (125 in)	
12	Gabriel Bertolini	20 August 1997	1.99 m (6 ft 6 in)	93 kg (205 lb)	338 cm (133 in)	315 cm (124 in)	(Brazil) SESI São Paulo
13	Maique Nascimento	16 July 1997	1.87 m (6 ft 2 in)	78 kg (172 lb)	0 cm (0 in)	0 cm (0 in)	
15	Luis Rodrigues	3 August 1998	1.88 m (6 ft 2 in)	69 kg (152 lb)	318 cm (125 in)	285 cm (112 in)	(Brazil) Santo André Vôlei
17	Alexandre Elias	30 September 1997	1.90 m (6 ft 3 in)	85 kg (187 lb)	358 cm (141 in)	335 cm (132 in)	
18	Lucas Adriano Barreto	24 June 1997	2.07 m (6 ft 9 in)	88 kg (194 lb)	349 cm (137 in)	322 cm (127 in)	(Brazil) SESI São Paulo
19	Pablo Natan Ventura	29 April 1998	1.94 m (6 ft 4 in)	92 kg (203 lb)	336 cm (132 in)	315 cm (124 in)	(Brazil) Sada Cruzeiro

== Canada ==
The following is the Canadian roster in the 2017 FIVB Volleyball Men's U21 World Championship.

Head coach: Gino Brousseau

No.	Name	Date of birth	Height	Weight	Spike	Block	2017 club
3	Jesse Elser	27 May 1999	2.03 m (6 ft 8 in)	86 kg (190 lb)	342 cm (135 in)	315 cm (124 in)	
4	Taryq Sani	6 November 1998	1.86 m (6 ft 1 in)	84 kg (185 lb)	366 cm (144 in)	330 cm (130 in)	(Canada) Alberta Golden Bears
5	Eric Loeppky	1 August 1998	1.97 m (6 ft 6 in)	89 kg (196 lb)	348 cm (137 in)	325 cm (128 in)	(Canada) Trinity Western Spartans
7	Jordan Pereira	8 March 1998	1.83 m (6 ft 0 in)	72 kg (159 lb)	323 cm (127 in)	297 cm (117 in)	(Canada) McMaster Marauders
8	Max Vriend	23 August 1997	2.02 m (6 ft 8 in)	88 kg (194 lb)	348 cm (137 in)	326 cm (128 in)	(Canada) MacEwan Griffins
9	Matthew Mawdsley (C)	21 January 1997	2.08 m (6 ft 10 in)	90 kg (200 lb)	350 cm (140 in)	328 cm (129 in)	(Canada) Waterloo Warriors
11	Fynn McCarthy	4 December 1999	2.00 m (6 ft 7 in)	89 kg (196 lb)	362 cm (143 in)	321 cm (126 in)	(Canada) Kelowna Volleyball Club
12	Mikael Clegg	11 August 1997	1.95 m (6 ft 5 in)	75 kg (165 lb)	342 cm (135 in)	319 cm (126 in)	(Canada) Winnipeg Wesmen
13	Matthew Passalent	8 June 1997	1.95 m (6 ft 5 in)	82 kg (181 lb)	351 cm (138 in)	322 cm (127 in)	(Canada) McMaster Marauders
14	Derek Epp	15 June 1998	1.96 m (6 ft 5 in)	88 kg (194 lb)	335 cm (132 in)	315 cm (124 in)	(Canada) Saskatchewan Huskies
15	Joel Rudd	28 August 1998	1.92 m (6 ft 4 in)	80 kg (180 lb)	331 cm (130 in)	310 cm (120 in)	(Canada) Queen's Golden Gaels
16	Daenan Gyimah	16 January 1998	1.99 m (6 ft 6 in)	75 kg (165 lb)	372 cm (146 in)	339 cm (133 in)	(United States) UCLA Bruins

== China ==
The following is the Chinese roster in the 2017 FIVB Volleyball Men's U21 World Championship.

Head coach: Ju Genyin

No.	Name	Date of birth	Height	Weight	Spike	Block	2017 club
1	Fei Chen	19 March 1997	1.88 m (6 ft 2 in)	75 kg (165 lb)	335 cm (132 in)	328 cm (129 in)	(China) Jiangsu
2	Zhihao Liu (C)	29 June 1997	1.91 m (6 ft 3 in)	94 kg (207 lb)	345 cm (136 in)	345 cm (136 in)	(China) Shandong
3	Hongbin Jiang	16 April 1997	1.91 m (6 ft 3 in)	92 kg (203 lb)	345 cm (136 in)	340 cm (130 in)	(China) Shanghai
4	Nan Li	10 April 1998	1.99 m (6 ft 6 in)	85 kg (187 lb)	345 cm (136 in)	339 cm (133 in)	(China) Shanghai
5	Yuantai Yu	3 December 1997	1.83 m (6 ft 0 in)	75 kg (165 lb)	320 cm (130 in)	310 cm (120 in)	(China) Jiangsu
7	Jingyi Wang	7 February 1998	2.01 m (6 ft 7 in)	95 kg (209 lb)	340 cm (130 in)	330 cm (130 in)	(China) Shandong
8	Liying Zhou	3 September 1997	1.95 m (6 ft 5 in)	95 kg (209 lb)	345 cm (136 in)	340 cm (130 in)	(China) Jiangsu
9	Zixuan Tao	5 April 1999	2.00 m (6 ft 7 in)	95 kg (209 lb)	316 cm (124 in)	305 cm (120 in)	(China) Shanghai
10	Lei Guo	25 December 1997	2.08 m (6 ft 10 in)	90 kg (200 lb)	357 cm (141 in)	345 cm (136 in)	(China) Shandong
11	Haoyu Du	2 August 1997	2.00 m (6 ft 7 in)	92 kg (203 lb)	332 cm (131 in)	325 cm (128 in)	(China) Bayi
12	Huaxing Yang	18 February 1997	1.81 m (5 ft 11 in)	78 kg (172 lb)	330 cm (130 in)	320 cm (130 in)	(China) Shandong
16	Zhengyang Jiang	25 August 1998	2.02 m (6 ft 8 in)	92 kg (203 lb)	345 cm (136 in)	340 cm (130 in)	(China) Henan

== Cuba ==
The following is the Cuban roster in the 2017 FIVB Volleyball Men's U21 World Championship.

Head coach: Nicolas Vives Coffigny

No.	Name	Date of birth	Height	Weight	Spike	Block	2017 club
1	José Israel Alvarez	2 December 1997	1.99 m (6 ft 6 in)	79 kg (174 lb)	349 cm (137 in)	347 cm (137 in)	(Cuba) Guantanamo
2	Osniel Melgarejo	18 December 1997	1.95 m (6 ft 5 in)	83 kg (183 lb)	345 cm (136 in)	320 cm (130 in)	(Greece) Panathinaikos V.C.
3	Marlon Yang Herrera	23 May 2001	2.02 m (6 ft 8 in)	75 kg (165 lb)	345 cm (136 in)	320 cm (130 in)	(Cuba) Villa Clara
5	Javier Octavio Rojas	27 December 1997	2.00 m (6 ft 7 in)	84 kg (185 lb)	356 cm (140 in)	350 cm (140 in)	(Cuba) La Habana
10	Miguel Gutiérrez	21 February 1997	1.97 m (6 ft 6 in)	86 kg (190 lb)	355 cm (140 in)	340 cm (130 in)	(Cuba) Villa Clara
11	Livan Taboada Diaz	4 October 1998	1.91 m (6 ft 3 in)	75 kg (165 lb)	343 cm (135 in)	327 cm (129 in)	(Cuba) La Habana
12	Raciel Cabrera	2 July 1998	1.98 m (6 ft 6 in)	85 kg (187 lb)	345 cm (136 in)	325 cm (128 in)	(Cuba) Pinar Del Rio
14	Adrian Arredondo (C)	26 June 1998	1.91 m (6 ft 3 in)	80 kg (180 lb)	344 cm (135 in)	340 cm (130 in)	(Cuba) Santic Spiritus
16	Victor Flores	31 August 2001	1.88 m (6 ft 2 in)	72 kg (159 lb)	345 cm (136 in)	338 cm (133 in)	(Cuba) Camaguey
17	Roamy Arce	24 July 1997	2.01 m (6 ft 7 in)	93 kg (205 lb)	350 cm (140 in)	330 cm (130 in)	(Cuba) Matanzas
18	Miguel Angel Castro	25 March 1997	1.89 m (6 ft 2 in)	75 kg (165 lb)	345 cm (136 in)	320 cm (130 in)	(Cuba) Cienfuegos
19	Lionnis Rubiera	25 July 1997	1.85 m (6 ft 1 in)	77 kg (170 lb)	332 cm (131 in)	332 cm (131 in)	Santiago de Cuba

== Czech Republic ==
The following is the Czech roster in the 2017 FIVB Volleyball Men's U21 World Championship.

Head coach: Ivan Pelikan

No.	Name	Date of birth	Height	Weight	Spike	Block	2017 club
1	Tomas Kunc	18 November 1997	1.84 m (6 ft 0 in)	80 kg (180 lb)	306 cm (120 in)	295 cm (116 in)	(Czech Republic) Dukla Liberec
2	Matyas Džavoronok	5 September 2001	1.94 m (6 ft 4 in)	80 kg (180 lb)	326 cm (128 in)	315 cm (124 in)	(Czech Republic) ČZU Praha
3	Vladimir Mikulenka	30 October 1997	1.96 m (6 ft 5 in)	95 kg (209 lb)	346 cm (136 in)	330 cm (130 in)	(Czech Republic) ČZU Praha
4	Donovan Dzavoronok	23 July 1997	2.02 m (6 ft 8 in)	85 kg (187 lb)	345 cm (136 in)	334 cm (131 in)	(Italy) Gi Group Monza
7	Marek Sulc	15 February 1998	1.90 m (6 ft 3 in)	84 kg (185 lb)	343 cm (135 in)	325 cm (128 in)	(Czech Republic) ČZU Praha
8	Martin Hudak	11 September 1997	2.04 m (6 ft 8 in)	105 kg (231 lb)	348 cm (137 in)	324 cm (128 in)	(Czech Republic) ČZU Praha
9	Kristian Cervinka (C)	20 March 1997	1.86 m (6 ft 1 in)	77 kg (170 lb)	325 cm (128 in)	318 cm (125 in)	(Czech Republic) Jihostroj České Budějovice
11	Patrik Indra	8 December 1997	2.00 m (6 ft 7 in)	83 kg (183 lb)	355 cm (140 in)	334 cm (131 in)	(Czech Republic) TJ Spartak Velké Meziříčí
13	Matej Smidl	25 February 1997	2.05 m (6 ft 9 in)	105 kg (231 lb)	350 cm (140 in)	335 cm (132 in)	(Czech Republic) VK Ostrava
15	Lukas Vasina	6 July 1999	1.92 m (6 ft 4 in)	75 kg (165 lb)	340 cm (130 in)	330 cm (130 in)	(Czech Republic) VK Ostrava
18	Pavel Horák	27 June 1999	2.02 m (6 ft 8 in)	86 kg (190 lb)	339 cm (133 in)	328 cm (129 in)	(Czech Republic) ČZU Praha
19	Radek Suda	20 November 1998	1.92 m (6 ft 4 in)	82 kg (181 lb)	342 cm (135 in)	328 cm (129 in)	(Czech Republic) VK Pribram

== Egypt ==
The following is the Egyptian roster in the 2017 FIVB Volleyball Men's U21 World Championship.

Head coach: Maged Mohamed Mostafa

No.	Name	Date of birth	Height	Weight	Spike	Block	2017 club
1	Youssef Hamdy Awad	27 August 2000	1.95 m (6 ft 5 in)	72 kg (159 lb)	316 cm (124 in)	306 cm (120 in)	(Egypt) Al Ahly SC
3	Omar Akram Ahmed	3 August 1998	1.95 m (6 ft 5 in)	72 kg (159 lb)	338 cm (133 in)	313 cm (123 in)	(Egypt) Al Ahly SC
4	Omar Mohamed	8 November 1998	1.87 m (6 ft 2 in)	87 kg (192 lb)	333 cm (131 in)	314 cm (124 in)	(Egypt) Al Ahly SC
5	Mahmoud Mostafa	22 December 1998	1.77 m (5 ft 10 in)	73 kg (161 lb)	292 cm (115 in)	280 cm (110 in)	(Egypt) Petrojet SC
8	Omar Aly	26 July 1997	1.93 m (6 ft 4 in)	88 kg (194 lb)	336 cm (132 in)	319 cm (126 in)	(Egypt) Al Ittihad Alexandria SC
10	Mohamed Zayed	16 December 1998	1.93 m (6 ft 4 in)	84 kg (185 lb)	327 cm (129 in)	314 cm (124 in)	(Egypt) Zamalek SC
13	Yasser Soliman	21 January 1998	1.92 m (6 ft 4 in)	75 kg (165 lb)	331 cm (130 in)	316 cm (124 in)	(Egypt) Heliopolis SC
15	Abdelrahman Seoudy (C)	21 August 1997	2.06 m (6 ft 9 in)	100 kg (220 lb)	344 cm (135 in)	332 cm (131 in)	(Egypt) Al Ahly SC
17	Mohamed Aly	20 February 1998	1.98 m (6 ft 6 in)	90 kg (200 lb)	336 cm (132 in)	327 cm (129 in)	(Egypt) Zamalek SC
18	Fathy Reda Abdelgwad	29 January 1998	2.04 m (6 ft 8 in)	97 kg (214 lb)	339 cm (133 in)	326 cm (128 in)	(Egypt) Alexandria SC
19	Abdelrahman Mahmoud Hussien	13 April 1998	1.95 m (6 ft 5 in)	82 kg (181 lb)	339 cm (133 in)	321 cm (126 in)	(Egypt) Zamalek SC
20	Marwan Badawi	14 May 1997	1.90 m (6 ft 3 in)	74 kg (163 lb)	331 cm (130 in)	314 cm (124 in)	(Egypt) Al Ahly SC

== Iran ==
The following is the Iranian roster in the 2017 FIVB Volleyball Men's U21 World Championship.

Head coach: Ataei Nouri Behrouz

No.	Name	Date of birth	Height	Weight	Spike	Block	2017 club
1	Rasoul Aghchehli (C)	28 January 1998	2.00 m (6 ft 7 in)	82 kg (181 lb)	340 cm (130 in)	315 cm (124 in)	(Iran) Kalleh Mazandaran VC
3	Esmaeil Mosaferdashliboroun	21 November 1997	1.92 m (6 ft 4 in)	71 kg (157 lb)	310 cm (120 in)	290 cm (110 in)	(Iran) Kalleh Mazandaran VC
5	Shayan Shahsavand	4 July 1997	1.91 m (6 ft 3 in)	84 kg (185 lb)	310 cm (120 in)	290 cm (110 in)	(Iran) Paykan Tehran VC
6	Aliasghar Mojarad	30 October 1997	2.05 m (6 ft 9 in)	90 kg (200 lb)	330 cm (130 in)	310 cm (120 in)	(Iran) Shahrdari Varamin VC
8	Esmaeil Talebi Khameneh	9 June 1998	1.90 m (6 ft 3 in)	80 kg (180 lb)	295 cm (116 in)	275 cm (108 in)	(Iran) Kalleh Mazandaran VC
9	Tayeb Einisamarein	30 May 1997	2.05 m (6 ft 9 in)	93 kg (205 lb)	320 cm (130 in)	300 cm (120 in)	(Iran)
12	Amirhossein Esfandiar	24 January 1999	2.05 m (6 ft 9 in)	110 kg (240 lb)	330 cm (130 in)	310 cm (120 in)	(Iran) Kalleh Mazandaran VC
13	Ali Ramezani	5 May 1998	2.00 m (6 ft 7 in)	103 kg (227 lb)	330 cm (130 in)	310 cm (120 in)	(Iran) Kalleh Mazandaran VC
14	Javad Karimisouchelmaei	1 March 1998	2.04 m (6 ft 8 in)	104 kg (229 lb)	330 cm (130 in)	310 cm (120 in)	(Iran) Kalleh Mazandaran VC
16	Ali Yousefpoornesfeji	20 April 1997	2.05 m (6 ft 9 in)	90 kg (200 lb)	335 cm (132 in)	320 cm (130 in)	(Iran) Saipa Tehran VC
19	Meisam Salehi	17 November 1998	1.98 m (6 ft 6 in)	89 kg (196 lb)	345 cm (136 in)	330 cm (130 in)	(Iran) Kalleh Mazandaran VC
20	Porya Yali	21 January 1999	2.09 m (6 ft 10 in)	81 kg (179 lb)	335 cm (132 in)	320 cm (130 in)	(Iran) Paykan Tehran VC

== Italy ==
The following is the Italian roster in the 2017 FIVB Volleyball Men's U21 World Championship.

Head coach: Michele Totire

No.	Name	Date of birth	Height	Weight	Spike	Block	2017 club
1	Davide Gardini	11 February 1999	2.00 m (6 ft 7 in)	80 kg (180 lb)	330 cm (130 in)	310 cm (120 in)	(Italy) Club Italia Roma
2	Alessandro Piccinelli	30 January 1997	1.89 m (6 ft 2 in)	98 kg (216 lb)	315 cm (124 in)	290 cm (110 in)	(Italy) Club Italia Roma
5	Roberto Cominetti	20 April 1997	1.90 m (6 ft 3 in)	78 kg (172 lb)	335 cm (132 in)	315 cm (124 in)	(Italy) Libertas Cantù
6	Riccardo Sbertoli	23 May 1998	1.88 m (6 ft 2 in)	85 kg (187 lb)	326 cm (128 in)	246 cm (97 in)	(Italy) Revivre Milano
7	Francesco Zoppellari	27 May 1997	1.85 m (6 ft 1 in)	79 kg (174 lb)	316 cm (124 in)	300 cm (120 in)	(Italy) Kioene Padova
8	Paolo Zonca	13 May 1997	1.95 m (6 ft 5 in)	86 kg (190 lb)	336 cm (132 in)	315 cm (124 in)	(Italy) Volley Potentino
9	Paolo Di Silvestre	31 January 1998	1.91 m (6 ft 3 in)	86 kg (190 lb)	330 cm (130 in)	325 cm (128 in)	(Italy) Cucine Lube Civitanova
10	Giulio Pinali	2 April 1997	1.99 m (6 ft 6 in)	91 kg (201 lb)	349 cm (137 in)	338 cm (133 in)	(Italy) Azimut Modena
12	Gianluca Galassi (C)	24 July 1997	2.01 m (6 ft 7 in)	94 kg (207 lb)	350 cm (140 in)	325 cm (128 in)	(Italy) Revivre Milano
17	Yuri Romanò	26 July 1997	2.01 m (6 ft 7 in)	89 kg (196 lb)	350 cm (140 in)	343 cm (135 in)	(Italy) Diavoli Rosa Brugherio
18	Gabriele Di Martino	20 July 1997	1.99 m (6 ft 6 in)	88 kg (194 lb)	340 cm (130 in)	320 cm (130 in)	(Italy) LPR Piacenza
19	Roberto Russo	23 February 1997	2.05 m (6 ft 9 in)	80 kg (180 lb)	340 cm (130 in)	320 cm (130 in)	(Italy) Club Italia Roma

== Japan ==
The following is the Japanese roster in the 2017 FIVB Volleyball Men's U21 World Championship.

Head coach: Tokunaga Fumitoshi

No.	Name	Date of birth	Height	Weight	Spike	Block	2017 club
1	Kenta Takanashi (C)	25 March 1997	1.90 m (6 ft 3 in)	77 kg (170 lb)	333 cm (131 in)	312 cm (123 in)	(Japan) Nippon Sport Science University
3	Takaki Koyama	23 November 1997	1.91 m (6 ft 3 in)	76 kg (168 lb)	330 cm (130 in)	315 cm (124 in)	(Japan) Osaka Sangyo University
4	Yudai Arai	27 June 1998	1.88 m (6 ft 2 in)	86 kg (190 lb)	345 cm (136 in)	333 cm (131 in)	(Japan) Tokai University
5	Kenyu Nakamoto	21 November 1997	1.87 m (6 ft 2 in)	68 kg (150 lb)	325 cm (128 in)	305 cm (120 in)	(Japan) Nippon Sport Science University
6	Kento Miyaura	22 February 1999	1.89 m (6 ft 2 in)	73 kg (161 lb)	338 cm (133 in)	320 cm (130 in)	(Japan) Waseda University
7	Jin Tsuzuki	28 December 1998	1.94 m (6 ft 4 in)	78 kg (172 lb)	340 cm (130 in)	320 cm (130 in)	(Japan) Chuo University
8	Taisei Muraoka	18 October 1998	1.90 m (6 ft 3 in)	85 kg (187 lb)	335 cm (132 in)	320 cm (130 in)	(Japan) Tokyo Gakugei University
10	Alan Kono	21 January 1999	1.80 m (5 ft 11 in)	74 kg (163 lb)	320 cm (130 in)	308 cm (121 in)	(Japan) Aichi Gakuin University
11	Shunichiro Sato	17 May 2000	2.03 m (6 ft 8 in)	92 kg (203 lb)	335 cm (132 in)	320 cm (130 in)	(Japan) Tohoku High School
12	Masaki Kaneko	23 October 1997	1.88 m (6 ft 2 in)	70 kg (150 lb)	333 cm (131 in)	320 cm (130 in)	(Japan) JT Thunders Hiroshima
14	Tomohiro Horie	23 June 1997	1.83 m (6 ft 0 in)	70 kg (150 lb)	315 cm (124 in)	305 cm (120 in)	(Japan) Waseda University
15	Yusuke Makiyama	4 November 1997	1.85 m (6 ft 1 in)	65 kg (143 lb)	320 cm (130 in)	303 cm (119 in)	(Japan) Chuo University

== Morocco ==
The following is the Moroccan roster in the 2017 FIVB Volleyball Men's U21 World Championship.

Head coach: Abdellaoui Maan Mohammed

No.	Name	Date of birth	Height	Weight	Spike	Block	2017 club
1	Oussama Elazhari	9 April 1999	1.93 m (6 ft 4 in)	80 kg (180 lb)	318 cm (125 in)	308 cm (121 in)	(Morocco) AS FAR Salé
2	Mohamed Elhindi	16 August 1998	1.90 m (6 ft 3 in)	74 kg (163 lb)	306 cm (120 in)	300 cm (120 in)	(Morocco) AS FAR Salé
4	Saad Marchoud	24 August 1998	2.04 m (6 ft 8 in)	99 kg (218 lb)	333 cm (131 in)	310 cm (120 in)	(Morocco) AS FAR Salé
5	M’Hamed Mifdal	3 June 1998	1.94 m (6 ft 4 in)	78 kg (172 lb)	318 cm (125 in)	308 cm (121 in)	(Morocco) ASS Salé
7	Mohamed En-Nakhai	2 April 1998	1.97 m (6 ft 6 in)	86 kg (190 lb)	315 cm (124 in)	309 cm (122 in)	(Morocco) AS FAR Salé
8	Karim Lamri (C)	6 August 1997	1.89 m (6 ft 2 in)	76 kg (168 lb)	320 cm (130 in)	310 cm (120 in)	(Morocco) TSC Casablanca
9	Ahmed Kerroumi	25 January 1998	1.90 m (6 ft 3 in)	76 kg (168 lb)	335 cm (132 in)	310 cm (120 in)	(Morocco) AOSF Figuig
10	Mehdi Ouriaghli Youma	8 September 1997	1.88 m (6 ft 2 in)	72 kg (159 lb)	316 cm (124 in)	307 cm (121 in)	(Morocco) IRT Tanger
11	Soufiane El Gharrouti	23 January 1998	1.84 m (6 ft 0 in)	66 kg (146 lb)	325 cm (128 in)	312 cm (123 in)	(Morocco) TSC Casablanca
12	Youssef Aatata	5 October 1998	1.90 m (6 ft 3 in)	72 kg (159 lb)	340 cm (130 in)	315 cm (124 in)	(Morocco) AS FAR Salé
13	Othman Ghassel	4 May 1998	1.99 m (6 ft 6 in)	86 kg (190 lb)	325 cm (128 in)	310 cm (120 in)	(Morocco) IRT Tanger
14	Abdelaziz Boulehena	30 November 1997	1.76 m (5 ft 9 in)	66 kg (146 lb)	288 cm (113 in)	280 cm (110 in)	(Morocco) IRT Tanger

== Poland ==
The following is the Polish roster in the 2017 FIVB Volleyball Men's U21 World Championship.

Head coach: Sebastian Pawlik

No.	Name	Date of birth	Height	Weight	Spike	Block	2017 club
2	Bartosz Kwolek	17 July 1997	1.92 m (6 ft 4 in)	91 kg (201 lb)	343 cm (135 in)	310 cm (120 in)	(Poland) AZS Politechnika Warszawska
3	Jakub Kochanowski (C)	17 July 1997	1.99 m (6 ft 6 in)	89 kg (196 lb)	353 cm (139 in)	323 cm (127 in)	(Poland) Indykpol AZS Olsztyn
4	Łukasz Kozub	3 November 1997	1.86 m (6 ft 1 in)	88 kg (194 lb)	333 cm (131 in)	300 cm (120 in)	(Poland) MKS Będzin
5	Radosław Gil	25 January 1997	1.92 m (6 ft 4 in)	81 kg (179 lb)	327 cm (129 in)	310 cm (120 in)	(Poland) Jastrzębski Węgiel
6	Szymon Jakubiszak	13 February 1998	2.07 m (6 ft 9 in)	88 kg (194 lb)	350 cm (140 in)	322 cm (127 in)	(Poland) Lotos Trefl Gdańsk
8	Jędrzej Gruszczyński	13 November 1997	1.86 m (6 ft 1 in)	78 kg (172 lb)	328 cm (129 in)	306 cm (120 in)	(Poland) AZS Politechnika Warszawska
9	Jakub Ziobrowski	23 January 1997	2.02 m (6 ft 8 in)	96 kg (212 lb)	353 cm (139 in)	325 cm (128 in)	(Poland) Cerrad Czarni Radom
10	Damian Domagała	23 April 1998	1.99 m (6 ft 6 in)	82 kg (181 lb)	346 cm (136 in)	320 cm (130 in)	(Poland) KS Wifama Łódź (U23)
13	Mateusz Masłowski	13 June 1997	1.85 m (6 ft 1 in)	78 kg (172 lb)	328 cm (129 in)	304 cm (120 in)	(Poland) Asseco Resovia Rzeszów
15	Norbert Huber	14 August 1998	2.04 m (6 ft 8 in)	80 kg (180 lb)	351 cm (138 in)	316 cm (124 in)	(Poland) AKS Resovia Rzeszow (U23)
16	Jarosław Mucha	25 May 1997	2.00 m (6 ft 7 in)	88 kg (194 lb)	340 cm (130 in)	315 cm (124 in)	(Poland) KS Norwid Częstochowa (U23)
18	Tomasz Fornal	31 August 1997	1.98 m (6 ft 6 in)	92 kg (203 lb)	340 cm (130 in)	315 cm (124 in)	(Poland) Cerrad Czarni Radom

== Russia ==
The following is the Russian roster in the 2017 FIVB Volleyball Men's U21 World Championship.

Head coach: Vladimir Khromenkov

No.	Name	Date of birth	Height	Weight	Spike	Block	2017 club
1	Anton Semyshev	22 August 1997	2.01 m (6 ft 7 in)	90 kg (200 lb)	350 cm (140 in)	340 cm (130 in)	(Russia) Gazprom-Ugra Surgut
3	Ilia Spodobets	26 July 1997	2.00 m (6 ft 7 in)	80 kg (180 lb)	350 cm (140 in)	340 cm (130 in)	(Russia) Belogorie Belgorod
5	Konstantin Abaev (C)	17 June 1999	1.92 m (6 ft 4 in)	82 kg (181 lb)	320 cm (130 in)	310 cm (120 in)	(Russia) Lokomotiv Novosibirsk
6	Aleksei Kononov	9 April 1997	2.05 m (6 ft 9 in)	93 kg (205 lb)	350 cm (140 in)	340 cm (130 in)	(Russia) Zenit Kazan
7	Vladimir Kupriashkin	18 May 1997	2.00 m (6 ft 7 in)	85 kg (187 lb)	340 cm (130 in)	330 cm (130 in)	(Russia) Gazprom-Ugra Surgut
8	Aleksandr Melnikov	3 May 1997	2.00 m (6 ft 7 in)	90 kg (200 lb)	350 cm (140 in)	340 cm (130 in)	(Russia) Dinamo Moscow
9	Aleksei Chanchikov	30 January 1997	1.90 m (6 ft 3 in)	80 kg (180 lb)	330 cm (130 in)	320 cm (130 in)	(Russia) Dinamo Moscow
10	Dmitry Yakovlev	21 June 1998	2.01 m (6 ft 7 in)	90 kg (200 lb)	350 cm (140 in)	340 cm (130 in)	(Russia) Dinamo Moscow
11	Slavomir Biarda	24 August 1997	2.05 m (6 ft 9 in)	95 kg (209 lb)	340 cm (130 in)	330 cm (130 in)	(Russia) Zenit Kazan
12	Sergei Melkozerov	25 April 1997	1.77 m (5 ft 10 in)	65 kg (143 lb)	310 cm (120 in)	295 cm (116 in)	(Russia) Lokomotiv Izumrud
14	Kirill Klets	15 March 1998	2.02 m (6 ft 8 in)	92 kg (203 lb)	340 cm (130 in)	330 cm (130 in)	(Russia) Lokomotiv Novosibirsk
20	Ivan Piskarev	7 June 1997	1.98 m (6 ft 6 in)	88 kg (194 lb)	340 cm (130 in)	330 cm (130 in)	(Russia) Yaroslavich Yaroslavl

== Turkey ==
The following is the Turkish roster in the 2017 FIVB Volleyball Men's U21 World Championship.

Head coach: Ali Kazım Hidayetoğlu

No.	Name	Date of birth	Height	Weight	Spike	Block	2017 club
2	Batuhan Avci	2 August 2000	1.96 m (6 ft 5 in)	72 kg (159 lb)	328 cm (129 in)	318 cm (125 in)	(Turkey) Beşiktaş Istanbul
3	Mustafa Cengiz	29 May 1998	2.01 m (6 ft 7 in)	85 kg (187 lb)	335 cm (132 in)	325 cm (128 in)	(Turkey) Arkas Izmir
4	Muzaffer Yonet	18 June 1997	1.90 m (6 ft 3 in)	70 kg (150 lb)	318 cm (125 in)	300 cm (120 in)	(Turkey) Arkas Izmir
5	Ogulcan Yatgin	28 April 1997	1.97 m (6 ft 6 in)	87 kg (192 lb)	320 cm (130 in)	309 cm (122 in)	(Turkey) Fenerbahçe Istanbul
6	Abdullah Cam (C)	30 March 1997	1.95 m (6 ft 5 in)	80 kg (180 lb)	316 cm (124 in)	300 cm (120 in)	(Turkey) Halkbank Ankara
9	Halil Ibrahim Kurt	16 February 1998	2.03 m (6 ft 8 in)	90 kg (200 lb)	323 cm (127 in)	311 cm (122 in)	(Turkey) Fenerbahçe Istanbul
10	Özgür Türkmen	22 January 1998	1.90 m (6 ft 3 in)	75 kg (165 lb)	325 cm (128 in)	312 cm (123 in)	(Turkey) Galatasaray Istanbul
12	Yunus Emre Tayaz	20 March 1998	2.01 m (6 ft 7 in)	95 kg (209 lb)	335 cm (132 in)	325 cm (128 in)	(Turkey) Bornova Anadolu Lisesi
13	Anil Durgut	25 June 1997	2.00 m (6 ft 7 in)	90 kg (200 lb)	328 cm (129 in)	313 cm (123 in)	(Turkey) Fenerbahçe Istanbul
15	Adis Lagumdzija	19 March 1999	2.04 m (6 ft 8 in)	96 kg (212 lb)	330 cm (130 in)	310 cm (120 in)	(Turkey) Galatasaray Istanbul
19	Oguzhan Dogruluk	1 January 1998	1.98 m (6 ft 6 in)	90 kg (200 lb)	325 cm (128 in)	310 cm (120 in)	(Turkey) Ziraat Bankası Ankara
20	Hüseyin Şahin	1 September 1998	1.86 m (6 ft 1 in)	80 kg (180 lb)	320 cm (130 in)	305 cm (120 in)	(Turkey) Arkas Izmir

== Ukraine ==
The following is the Ukrainian roster in the 2017 FIVB Volleyball Men's U21 World Championship.

Head coach: Mykola Pasazhin

No.	Name	Date of birth	Height	Weight	Spike	Block	2017 club
1	Tymofii Poluian (C)	10 January 1998	0 m (0 in)	0 kg (0 lb)	0 cm (0 in)	0 cm (0 in)	
2	Vitalii Kucher	27 October 1997	1.96 m (6 ft 5 in)	82 kg (181 lb)	325 cm (128 in)	300 cm (120 in)	(Ukraine) Lokomotyv Kharkiv
3	Volodymyr Ostapenko	28 July 1998	1.98 m (6 ft 6 in)	82 kg (181 lb)	330 cm (130 in)	305 cm (120 in)	(Ukraine) Lokomotyv Kharkiv
5	Oleh Plotnytskyi	5 June 1997	0 m (0 in)	0 kg (0 lb)	0 cm (0 in)	0 cm (0 in)	
6	Oleksii Holoven	12 January 1999	0 m (0 in)	0 kg (0 lb)	0 cm (0 in)	0 cm (0 in)	
7	Kyrylo Lykhodid	19 February 1997	1.98 m (6 ft 6 in)	88 kg (194 lb)	330 cm (130 in)	310 cm (120 in)	(Ukraine) Dnipro Dnipropetrovsk
8	Andrii Rohozhyn	13 July 1997	2.03 m (6 ft 8 in)	95 kg (209 lb)	345 cm (136 in)	325 cm (128 in)	(Ukraine) Yurydychna Akademiya Kharkiv
9	Dmytro Vietskiy	19 February 1998	0 m (0 in)	0 kg (0 lb)	0 cm (0 in)	0 cm (0 in)	
11	Dmytro Kanaiev	3 October 1997	1.75 m (5 ft 9 in)	73 kg (161 lb)	310 cm (120 in)	290 cm (110 in)	
12	Mykhailo Stolbunov	3 June 1997	1.88 m (6 ft 2 in)	82 kg (181 lb)	315 cm (124 in)	290 cm (110 in)	(Ukraine) Yurydychna Akademiya Kharkiv
13	Heorhii Klepko	12 February 1997	2.00 m (6 ft 7 in)	90 kg (200 lb)	345 cm (136 in)	320 cm (130 in)	(Ukraine) VPS Vinnytsia
15	Luciano Palonsky	8 July 1999	1.94 m (6 ft 4 in)	89 kg (196 lb)	315 cm (124 in)	305 cm (120 in)	(Ukraine) Lokomotyv Kharkiv

== United States ==
The following is the American roster in the 2017 FIVB Volleyball Men's U21 World Championship.

Head coach: Jay Hosack

No.	Name	Date of birth	Height	Weight	Spike	Block	2017 club
2	Gage Worsley	21 October 1998	1.88 m (6 ft 2 in)	84 kg (185 lb)	318 cm (125 in)	305 cm (120 in)	(United States) Pacific Rim Volley. Academy
3	Joshua Tuaniga (C)	18 March 1997	1.91 m (6 ft 3 in)	102 kg (225 lb)	320 cm (130 in)	307 cm (121 in)	(United States) Long Beach State 49ers
4	Micah Maʻa	16 April 1997	1.92 m (6 ft 4 in)	88 kg (194 lb)	333 cm (131 in)	318 cm (125 in)	(United States) UCLA Bruins
5	Dylan Missry	28 November 1997	1.93 m (6 ft 4 in)	98 kg (216 lb)	348 cm (137 in)	325 cm (128 in)	(United States) UCLA Bruins
7	Jordan Ewert	18 March 1997	1.96 m (6 ft 5 in)	91 kg (201 lb)	335 cm (132 in)	320 cm (130 in)	(United States) Stanford Cardinal
8	Austin Matautia	6 February 1998	1.96 m (6 ft 5 in)	84 kg (185 lb)	348 cm (137 in)	338 cm (133 in)	(United States) University of Hawaii
9	Brett Rosenmeier	5 February 1997	1.96 m (6 ft 5 in)	96 kg (212 lb)	338 cm (133 in)	323 cm (127 in)	(United States) University of Hawaii
14	Kyle Ensing	6 March 1997	2.01 m (6 ft 7 in)	100 kg (220 lb)	366 cm (144 in)	353 cm (139 in)	(United States) Long Beach State 49ers
15	Matthew Szews	26 April 1998	2.03 m (6 ft 8 in)	93 kg (205 lb)	344 cm (135 in)	325 cm (128 in)	(United States) Ball State Cardinals
16	Patrick Gasman	2 January 1997	2.08 m (6 ft 10 in)	107 kg (236 lb)	351 cm (138 in)	338 cm (133 in)	(United States) University of Hawaii
19	George Huhmann	17 October 1997	2.12 m (6 ft 11 in)	93 kg (205 lb)	358 cm (141 in)	345 cm (136 in)	(United States) Princeton Tigers
20	Scott Stadick	15 January 1998	2.13 m (7 ft 0 in)	95 kg (209 lb)	358 cm (141 in)	351 cm (138 in)	(United States) UC Irvine Anteaters
