= 2019 FIVB Volleyball Men's World Cup squads =

This article shows the rosters of all participating teams at the 2019 FIVB Volleyball Men's World Cup in Japan.

== Argentina ==
The following is the Argentine roster in the 2019 FIVB Volleyball Men's World Cup.

Head coach: Marcelo Méndez

No.	Name	Date of birth	Height	Weight	Spike	Block	2018–19 club
1	Matías Sánchez	20 September 1996	1.73 m (5 ft 8 in)	67 kg (148 lb)	306 cm (120 in)	290 cm (110 in)	(Argentina) Bolívar
2	Nicolás Serba	13 June 1999	2.03 m (6 ft 8 in)	94 kg (207 lb)	334 cm (131 in)	311 cm (122 in)	(Argentina) UPCN San Juan
3	Jan Martínez	28 January 1998	1.90 m (6 ft 3 in)	85 kg (187 lb)	333 cm (131 in)	316 cm (124 in)	(Argentina) Buenos Aires
4	Luciano Palonsky	8 July 1999	1.98 m (6 ft 6 in)	72 kg (159 lb)	330 cm (130 in)	310 cm (120 in)	(Argentina) Buenos Aires
7	Matías Giraudo	13 March 1998	1.96 m (6 ft 5 in)	85 kg (187 lb)	330 cm (130 in)	315 cm (124 in)	(Argentina) River Plate
8	Agustín Loser	12 October 1997	1.93 m (6 ft 4 in)	77 kg (170 lb)	335 cm (132 in)	310 cm (120 in)	(Argentina) Buenos Aires
9	Santiago Danani	12 December 1995	1.76 m (5 ft 9 in)	77 kg (170 lb)	324 cm (128 in)	309 cm (122 in)	(Argentina) Club de Amigos
10	Nicolás Lazo	16 April 1995	1.92 m (6 ft 4 in)	85 kg (187 lb)	340 cm (130 in)	320 cm (130 in)	(Argentina) UPCN San Juan
12	Bruno Lima	4 February 1996	1.98 m (6 ft 6 in)	87 kg (192 lb)	345 cm (136 in)	320 cm (130 in)	(Argentina) Bolívar
13	Ezequiel Palacios	2 October 1992	1.98 m (6 ft 6 in)	95 kg (209 lb)	345 cm (136 in)	325 cm (128 in)	(Argentina) La Unión de Formosa
14	Luciano Vicentín	4 April 2000	1.97 m (6 ft 6 in)	84 kg (185 lb)	333 cm (131 in)	315 cm (124 in)	(Argentina) UPCN San Juan
18	Martín Ramos (c)	26 August 1991	1.97 m (6 ft 6 in)	94 kg (207 lb)	348 cm (137 in)	328 cm (129 in)	(Argentina) UPCN San Juan
23	Joaquín Gallego	21 November 1996	2.04 m (6 ft 8 in)	102 kg (225 lb)	343 cm (135 in)	323 cm (127 in)	(Argentina) Bolívar
24	Germán Johansen	2 September 1995	2.00 m (6 ft 7 in)	85 kg (187 lb)	351 cm (138 in)	336 cm (132 in)	(Argentina) Club de Amigos

== Australia ==
The following is the Australian roster in the 2019 FIVB Volleyball Men's World Cup.

Head coach: Mark Lebedew

No.	Name	Date of birth	Height	Weight	Spike	Block	2018–19 club
2	Arshdeep Dosanjh	30 July 1996	2.05 m (6 ft 9 in)	85 kg (187 lb)	347 cm (137 in)	335 cm (132 in)	(Switzerland) Chênois Genève
4	Paul Sanderson	7 January 1986	1.95 m (6 ft 5 in)	94 kg (207 lb)	348 cm (137 in)	335 cm (132 in)	(Tunisia) Sahel
5	Travis Passier	26 April 1989	2.08 m (6 ft 10 in)	100 kg (220 lb)	355 cm (140 in)	340 cm (130 in)	(Czech Republic) Příbram
8	Trent O'Dea	11 May 1994	2.01 m (6 ft 7 in)	98 kg (216 lb)	354 cm (139 in)	344 cm (135 in)	(Finland) Raision
9	Max Staples (c)	27 July 1994	1.94 m (6 ft 4 in)	83 kg (183 lb)	358 cm (141 in)	345 cm (136 in)	(Finland) Hurrikaani Loimaa
10	Jordan Richards	25 September 1993	1.93 m (6 ft 4 in)	80 kg (180 lb)	354 cm (139 in)	342 cm (135 in)	(Italy) Grottazzolina
11	Luke Perry	20 November 1995	1.80 m (5 ft 11 in)	75 kg (165 lb)	331 cm (130 in)	315 cm (124 in)	(Germany) Berlin Recycling Volleys
12	Nehemiah Mote	21 June 1993	2.04 m (6 ft 8 in)	91 kg (201 lb)	362 cm (143 in)	354 cm (139 in)	(Switzerland) Amriswil
13	Samuel Walker	19 February 1995	2.08 m (6 ft 10 in)	90 kg (200 lb)	350 cm (140 in)	337 cm (133 in)	(Estonia) Tartu
14	Benjamin Bell	24 February 1990	2.00 m (6 ft 7 in)	92 kg (203 lb)	345 cm (136 in)	333 cm (131 in)	(Australia) Queensland Pirates
15	Luke Smith	30 August 1990	2.04 m (6 ft 8 in)	95 kg (209 lb)	360 cm (140 in)	342 cm (135 in)	(Portugal) Sporting
18	Lincoln Williams	6 October 1993	2.00 m (6 ft 7 in)	104 kg (229 lb)	353 cm (139 in)	330 cm (130 in)	(Germany) United Rhein-Main
22	Curtis Stockton	22 April 1993	1.98 m (6 ft 6 in)	94 kg (207 lb)	351 cm (138 in)	330 cm (130 in)	(Estonia) Tartu
23	James Weir	20 July 1995	2.04 m (6 ft 8 in)	95 kg (209 lb)	348 cm (137 in)	342 cm (135 in)	(Australia) Brandon University

== Brazil ==
The following is the Brazilian roster in the 2019 FIVB Volleyball Men's World Cup.

Head coach: Renan Dal Zotto

No.	Name	Date of birth	Height	Weight	Spike	Block	2018–19 club
1	Bruno Rezende (c)	2 July 1986	1.90 m (6 ft 3 in)	76 kg (168 lb)	323 cm (127 in)	302 cm (119 in)	(Italy) Lube Civitanova
2	Isac Santos	13 December 1990	2.08 m (6 ft 10 in)	99 kg (218 lb)	339 cm (133 in)	306 cm (120 in)	(Brazil) Sada Cruzeiro
5	Maurício Borges Silva	4 February 1989	1.99 m (6 ft 6 in)	99 kg (218 lb)	335 cm (132 in)	315 cm (124 in)	(Brazil) SESC-RJ
6	Fernando Kreling	13 January 1996	1.85 m (6 ft 1 in)	85 kg (187 lb)	319 cm (126 in)	301 cm (119 in)	(Brazil) Sada Cruzeiro
9	Yoandy Leal	31 August 1988	2.02 m (6 ft 8 in)	107 kg (236 lb)	361 cm (142 in)	348 cm (137 in)	(Italy) Lube Civitanova
12	Douglas Souza	20 August 1995	1.99 m (6 ft 6 in)	75 kg (165 lb)	338 cm (133 in)	317 cm (125 in)	(Brazil) Funvic Taubaté
13	Maurício Souza	29 September 1988	2.09 m (6 ft 10 in)	93 kg (205 lb)	344 cm (135 in)	323 cm (127 in)	(Brazil) SESC-RJ
16	Lucas Saatkamp	6 March 1986	2.09 m (6 ft 10 in)	101 kg (223 lb)	340 cm (130 in)	321 cm (126 in)	(Brazil) Funvic Taubaté
17	Thales Hoss	26 April 1989	1.90 m (6 ft 3 in)	74 kg (163 lb)	320 cm (130 in)	303 cm (119 in)	(Brazil) Funvic Taubaté
18	Ricardo Lucarelli Souza	14 February 1992	1.96 m (6 ft 5 in)	87 kg (192 lb)	348 cm (137 in)	326 cm (128 in)	(Brazil) Funvic Taubaté
19	Felipe Roque	19 May 1997	2.06 m (6 ft 9 in)	99 kg (218 lb)	337 cm (133 in)	317 cm (125 in)	(Brazil) Minas T.C.
21	Alan Souza	21 March 1994	2.02 m (6 ft 8 in)	98 kg (216 lb)	336 cm (132 in)	320 cm (130 in)	(Brazil) SESI-SP
22	Maique Nascimento	16 July 1997	1.82 m (6 ft 0 in)	76 kg (168 lb)	310 cm (120 in)	255 cm (100 in)	(Brazil) Minas T.C.
23	Flávio Gualberto	22 April 1993	1.99 m (6 ft 6 in)	84 kg (185 lb)	356 cm (140 in)	329 cm (130 in)	(Brazil) Minas T.C.

== Canada ==
The following is the Canadian roster in the 2019 FIVB Volleyball Men's World Cup.

Head coach: Daniel Lewis

No.	Name	Date of birth	Height	Weight	Spike	Block	2018–19 club
3	Steven Marshall	23 November 1989	1.93 m (6 ft 4 in)	87 kg (192 lb)	350 cm (140 in)	322 cm (127 in)	(Turkey) İnegöl Belediye
4	Nicholas Hoag (c)	19 August 1992	2.00 m (6 ft 7 in)	91 kg (201 lb)	342 cm (135 in)	322 cm (127 in)	(Italy) Perugia
6	Ryley Barnes	11 October 1993	2.00 m (6 ft 7 in)	92 kg (203 lb)	348 cm (137 in)	325 cm (128 in)	(Italy) Pallavolo Padova
7	Stephen Timothy Maar	6 December 1994	2.01 m (6 ft 7 in)	103 kg (227 lb)	350 cm (140 in)	328 cm (129 in)	(Italy) Milano
9	Jason DeRocco	19 September 1989	1.98 m (6 ft 6 in)	94 kg (207 lb)	342 cm (135 in)	318 cm (125 in)	(Japan) FC Tokyo
10	Sharone Vernon-Evans	28 August 1998	2.02 m (6 ft 8 in)	94 kg (207 lb)	374 cm (147 in)	347 cm (137 in)	(Poland) Onico Warszawa
11	Daniel Jansen Van Doorn	21 March 1990	2.07 m (6 ft 9 in)	98 kg (216 lb)	351 cm (138 in)	328 cm (129 in)	(Finland) VaLePa Sastamala
12	Lucas Van Berkel	29 November 1991	2.10 m (6 ft 11 in)	108 kg (238 lb)	350 cm (140 in)	326 cm (128 in)	(Germany) United Volleys Frankfurt
13	Byron Keturakis	11 January 1996	2 m (6 ft 7 in)	88 kg (194 lb)	348 cm (137 in)	0 cm (0 in)	(France) Narbonne
19	Blair Cameron Bann	26 February 1988	1.84 m (6 ft 0 in)	84 kg (185 lb)	314 cm (124 in)	8 cm (3.1 in)	(France) Chaumont V.C.
20	Arthur Szwarc	30 March 1995	2.09 m (6 ft 10 in)	99 kg (218 lb)	356 cm (140 in)	8 cm (3.1 in)	(France) Arago de Sete
21	Brett James Walsh	19 February 1994	1.95 m (6 ft 5 in)	84 kg (185 lb)	332 cm (131 in)	0 cm (0 in)	(Belgium) Knack Roeselare
22	Blake Scheerhoorn	6 January 1995	2.02 m (6 ft 8 in)	90 kg (200 lb)	359 cm (141 in)	0 cm (0 in)	(France) Nantes V.C.
23	Danny Demyanenko	13 July 1994	1.94 m (6 ft 4 in)	101 kg (223 lb)	357 cm (141 in)	6 cm (2.4 in)	(Canada) Toulouse

== Egypt ==
The following is the Egyptian roster in the 2019 FIVB Volleyball Men's World Cup.

Head Coach: Gido Vermeulen

No.	Name	Date of birth	Height	Weight	Spike	Block	2018–19 club
1	Ahmed Mohamed	1 March 1989	1.93 m (6 ft 4 in)	83 kg (183 lb)	335 cm (132 in)	330 cm (130 in)	(Egypt) Al Ahly SC
2	Abdallah Abdalsalam Abdallah Bekhit	10 October 1983	2.02 m (6 ft 8 in)	85 kg (187 lb)	346 cm (136 in)	330 cm (130 in)	(Egypt) Al Ahly SC
4	Ahmed Abdelhay (c)	19 August 1984	1.97 m (6 ft 6 in)	87 kg (192 lb)	342 cm (135 in)	316 cm (124 in)	(Egypt) Al Ahly SC
5	Abdelrahman Seoudy	21 August 1997	2.07 m (6 ft 9 in)	100 kg (220 lb)	350 cm (140 in)	337 cm (133 in)	(Egypt) Al Ahly SC
6	Mohamed Hassan	28 September 1993	1.93 m (6 ft 4 in)	76 kg (168 lb)	319 cm (126 in)	302 cm (119 in)	(Egypt) Zamalek SC
7	Hisham Ewais	26 February 1995	1.96 m (6 ft 5 in)	75 kg (165 lb)	346 cm (136 in)	322 cm (127 in)	(Egypt) Smouha SC
9	Rashad Atia	2 September 1986	2.01 m (6 ft 7 in)	91 kg (201 lb)	348 cm (137 in)	342 cm (135 in)	(Egypt) Tala'ea El Gaish SC
10	Mohamed Masoud	1 May 1994	2.11 m (6 ft 11 in)	105 kg (231 lb)	358 cm (141 in)	342 cm (135 in)	(Egypt) Al Ahly SC
12	Hossam Abdalla	16 February 1988	2.03 m (6 ft 8 in)	97 kg (214 lb)	345 cm (136 in)	338 cm (133 in)	(Egypt) Al Ahly SC
14	Omar Hassan	4 April 1991	1.91 m (6 ft 3 in)	104 kg (229 lb)	333 cm (131 in)	324 cm (128 in)	(Egypt) Tala'ea El Gaish SC
16	Mohamed Abdelmohsen Seliman	4 January 1995	2.08 m (6 ft 10 in)	90 kg (200 lb)	336 cm (132 in)	322 cm (127 in)	(Egypt) Zamalek SC
18	Ahmed Shafik	7 December 1994	1.9 m (6 ft 3 in)	89 kg (196 lb)	358 cm (141 in)	341 cm (134 in)	(Egypt) Al Ahly SC
23	Ahmed Omar	4 March 1995	1.96 m (6 ft 5 in)	93 kg (205 lb)	326 cm (128 in)	315 cm (124 in)	(Egypt) Zamalek SC
24	Mahmoud Mohamed	7 April 1986	1.97 m (6 ft 6 in)	93 kg (205 lb)	350 cm (140 in)	335 cm (132 in)	(Egypt) Smouha SC

== Iran ==
The following is the Iranian roster in the 2019 FIVB Volleyball Men's World Cup.

Head coach: Igor Kolaković

No.	Name	Date of birth	Height	Weight	Spike	Block	2018–19 club
2	Milad Ebadipour	17 October 1993	1.96 m (6 ft 5 in)	78 kg (172 lb)	350 cm (140 in)	310 cm (120 in)	(Poland) Skra Bełchatów
4	Saeid Marouf (c)	20 October 1985	1.89 m (6 ft 2 in)	81 kg (179 lb)	331 cm (130 in)	311 cm (122 in)	(Italy) Emma Villas Siena
5	Farhad Ghaemi	28 August 1989	1.97 m (6 ft 6 in)	73 kg (161 lb)	355 cm (140 in)	335 cm (132 in)	(Turkey) Ziraat Bankası
7	Pouria Fayazi	12 January 1993	1.95 m (6 ft 5 in)	92 kg (203 lb)	335 cm (132 in)	325 cm (128 in)	(Iran) Shahrdari Varamin
8	Mohammad Reza Hazratpour	31 March 1999	1.87 m (6 ft 2 in)	87 kg (192 lb)	300 cm (120 in)	290 cm (110 in)	(Iran) Saipa
9	Masoud Gholami	2 April 1990	2.04 m (6 ft 8 in)	93 kg (205 lb)	349 cm (137 in)	331 cm (130 in)	(Iran) Shahrdari Varamin
10	Amir Ghafour	6 June 1991	2.02 m (6 ft 8 in)	90 kg (200 lb)	354 cm (139 in)	334 cm (131 in)	(Italy) Gi Group Monza
15	Aliasghar Mojarad	30 October 1997	2.05 m (6 ft 9 in)	90 kg (200 lb)	330 cm (130 in)	310 cm (120 in)	(Iran) Shahrdari Varamin
16	Ali Shafiei	21 September 1991	1.90 m (6 ft 3 in)	80 kg (180 lb)	348 cm (137 in)	345 cm (136 in)	(Iran) Saipa
19	Mohammad Reza Moazzen	20 September 1991	1.75 m (5 ft 9 in)	75 kg (165 lb)	292 cm (115 in)	281 cm (111 in)	(Iran) Shahrdari Tabriz
20	Porya Yali	21 January 1999	2.09 m (6 ft 10 in)	81 kg (179 lb)	335 cm (132 in)	320 cm (130 in)	(Iran) Paykan
22	Amirhossein Esfandiar	24 January 1999	2.05 m (6 ft 9 in)	110 kg (240 lb)	330 cm (130 in)	310 cm (120 in)	(Iran) Paykan
24	Javad Karimi	1 March 1998	2.04 m (6 ft 8 in)	104 kg (229 lb)	330 cm (130 in)	310 cm (120 in)	(Iran) Paykan

== Italy ==
The following is the Italian roster in the 2019 FIVB Volleyball Men's World Cup.

Head coach: Gianlorenzo Blengini

No.	Name	Date of birth	Height	Weight	Spike	Block	2018–19 club
1	Davide Candellaro	7 June 1989	2.00 m (6 ft 7 in)	88 kg (194 lb)	340 cm (130 in)	320 cm (130 in)	(Italy) Trentino
2	Riccardo Sbertoli	23 May 1998	1.88 m (6 ft 2 in)	85 kg (187 lb)	326 cm (128 in)	346 cm (136 in)	(Italy) Power
11	Fabio Balaso	20 October 1995	1.78 m (5 ft 10 in)	73 kg (161 lb)	305 cm (120 in)	280 cm (110 in)	(Italy) Lube
12	Dick Kooy	3 December 1987	2.02 m (6 ft 8 in)	80 kg (180 lb)	360 cm (140 in)	340 cm (130 in)	(Turkey) Halkbank Ankara
14	Matteo Piano (c)	24 October 1990	2.08 m (6 ft 10 in)	102 kg (225 lb)	352 cm (139 in)	325 cm (128 in)	(Italy) Power
15	Roberto Russo	23 February 1997	2.07 m (6 ft 9 in)	91 kg (201 lb)	340 cm (130 in)	320 cm (130 in)	(Italy) Perugia
16	Oleg Antonov	28 July 1988	1.98 m (6 ft 6 in)	88 kg (194 lb)	340 cm (130 in)	310 cm (120 in)	(Turkey) Galatasaray
17	Simone Anzani	24 February 1992	2.04 m (6 ft 8 in)	100 kg (220 lb)	350 cm (140 in)	330 cm (130 in)	(Italy) Perugia
18	Nicola Pesaresi	11 February 1991	1.90 m (6 ft 3 in)	80 kg (180 lb)	315 cm (124 in)	309 cm (122 in)	(Italy) Power
19	Daniele Lavia	4 November 1999	2.00 m (6 ft 7 in)	89 kg (196 lb)	345 cm (136 in)	316 cm (124 in)	(Italy) Porto Robur Costa
20	Gabriele Nelli	4 December 1993	2.10 m (6 ft 11 in)	100 kg (220 lb)	355 cm (140 in)	320 cm (130 in)	(Italy) Piacenza
22	Oreste Cavuto	5 December 1996	1.96 m (6 ft 5 in)	87 kg (192 lb)	353 cm (139 in)	344 cm (135 in)	(Italy) Robur Ravenna
24	Giulio Pinali	2 April 1997	1.99 m (6 ft 6 in)	91 kg (201 lb)	349 cm (137 in)	338 cm (133 in)	(Italy) Modena Volley
25	Francesco Zoppellari	27 May 1997	1.85 m (6 ft 1 in)	79 kg (174 lb)	316 cm (124 in)	300 cm (120 in)	(Italy) Padova

== Japan ==
The following is the Japanese roster in the 2019 FIVB Volleyball Men's World Cup.

Head coach: Yuichi Nakagaichi

No.	Name	Date of birth	Height	Weight	Spike	Block	2018–19 club
1	Kunihiro Shimizu	11 August 1986	1.93 m (6 ft 4 in)	97 kg (214 lb)	330 cm (130 in)	320 cm (130 in)	(Japan) Panasonic Panthers
3	Naonobu Fujii	5 January 1992	1.83 m (6 ft 0 in)	78 kg (172 lb)	312 cm (123 in)	297 cm (117 in)	(Japan) Toray Arrows
4	Issei Otake	3 December 1995	2.01 m (6 ft 7 in)	98 kg (216 lb)	345 cm (136 in)	327 cm (129 in)	(Japan) Panasonic Panthers
5	Tatsuya Fukuzawa	1 July 1986	1.89 m (6 ft 2 in)	88 kg (194 lb)	355 cm (140 in)	330 cm (130 in)	(Japan) Panasonic Panthers
6	Akihiro Yamauchi	30 November 1993	2.04 m (6 ft 8 in)	80 kg (180 lb)	353 cm (139 in)	335 cm (132 in)	(Japan) Panasonic Panthers
8	Masahiro Yanagida (c)	6 July 1992	1.86 m (6 ft 1 in)	79 kg (174 lb)	328 cm (129 in)	301 cm (119 in)	Free agent
10	Taichiro Koga	4 October 1989	1.70 m (5 ft 7 in)	70 kg (150 lb)	292 cm (115 in)	277 cm (109 in)	(Japan) Toyoda Gosei Trefuerza
11	Yūji Nishida	30 January 2000	1.86 m (6 ft 1 in)	80 kg (180 lb)	346 cm (136 in)	330 cm (130 in)	(Japan) JTEKT Stings
12	Masahiro Sekita	20 November 1993	1.75 m (5 ft 9 in)	73 kg (161 lb)	331 cm (130 in)	296 cm (117 in)	(Japan) Osaka Blazers Sakai
13	Naoya Takano	30 April 1993	1.90 m (6 ft 3 in)	78 kg (172 lb)	338 cm (133 in)	316 cm (124 in)	(Japan) Osaka Blazers Sakai
14	Yūki Ishikawa	11 December 1995	1.91 m (6 ft 3 in)	84 kg (185 lb)	351 cm (138 in)	327 cm (129 in)	Free agent
15	Haku Ri	27 December 1990	1.93 m (6 ft 4 in)	82 kg (181 lb)	344 cm (135 in)	330 cm (130 in)	(Japan) Toray Arrows
16	Kentaro Takahashi	8 February 1995	2.01 m (6 ft 7 in)	103 kg (227 lb)	351 cm (138 in)	338 cm (133 in)	(Japan) Toray Arrows
17	Tsubasa Hisahara	18 March 1995	1.88 m (6 ft 2 in)	80 kg (180 lb)	339 cm (133 in)	320 cm (130 in)	(Japan) Panasonic Panthers
20	Taishi Onodera	27 February 1996	2.01 m (6 ft 7 in)	98 kg (216 lb)	346 cm (136 in)	323 cm (127 in)	(Japan) JT Thunders
22	Tomohiro Yamamoto	5 November 1994	1.71 m (5 ft 7 in)	69 kg (152 lb)	301 cm (119 in)	299 cm (118 in)	(Japan) Sakai Blazers

== Poland ==
The following is the Polish roster in the 2019 FIVB Volleyball Men's World Cup.

Head coach: Vital Heynen

No.	Name	Date of birth	Height	Weight	Spike	Block	2018–19 club
2	Maciej Muzaj	21 May 1994	2.08 m (6 ft 10 in)	86 kg (190 lb)	360 cm (140 in)	320 cm (130 in)	(Poland) Trefl Gdańsk
4	Marcin Komenda	24 May 1996	1.98 m (6 ft 6 in)	90 kg (200 lb)	335 cm (132 in)	315 cm (124 in)	(Poland) GKS Katowice
5	Łukasz Kaczmarek	29 June 1994	2.04 m (6 ft 8 in)	99 kg (218 lb)	345 cm (136 in)	332 cm (131 in)	(Poland) ZAKSA Kędzierzyn-Koźle
6	Bartosz Kurek (c)	29 August 1988	2.05 m (6 ft 9 in)	87 kg (192 lb)	352 cm (139 in)	326 cm (128 in)	(Poland) ONICO Warszawa
7	Artur Szalpuk	20 March 1995	2.01 m (6 ft 7 in)	93 kg (205 lb)	350 cm (140 in)	335 cm (132 in)	(Poland) PGE Skra Bełchatów
9	Wilfredo León	31 July 1993	2.02 m (6 ft 8 in)	96 kg (212 lb)	350 cm (140 in)	345 cm (136 in)	(Italy) Perugia Volley
10	Damian Wojtaszek	7 September 1988	1.80 m (5 ft 11 in)	76 kg (168 lb)	330 cm (130 in)	301 cm (119 in)	(Poland) ONICO Warszawa
11	Fabian Drzyzga	3 January 1990	1.96 m (6 ft 5 in)	90 kg (200 lb)	325 cm (128 in)	304 cm (120 in)	(Russia) VC Lokomotiv Novosibirsk
12	Grzegorz Łomacz	1 October 1987	1.87 m (6 ft 2 in)	80 kg (180 lb)	335 cm (132 in)	315 cm (124 in)	(Poland) PGE Skra Bełchatów
13	Michał Kubiak	23 February 1988	1.91 m (6 ft 3 in)	80 kg (180 lb)	328 cm (129 in)	312 cm (123 in)	(Japan) Panasonic Panthers
14	Aleksander Śliwka	24 May 1995	1.96 m (6 ft 5 in)	88 kg (194 lb)	340 cm (130 in)	315 cm (124 in)	(Poland) ZAKSA Kędzierzyn-Koźle
15	Jakub Kochanowski	17 July 1997	1.99 m (6 ft 6 in)	89 kg (196 lb)	353 cm (139 in)	323 cm (127 in)	(Poland) PGE Skra Bełchatów
17	Paweł Zatorski	21 June 1990	1.84 m (6 ft 0 in)	73 kg (161 lb)	328 cm (129 in)	304 cm (120 in)	(Poland) ZAKSA Kędzierzyn-Koźle
18	Bartosz Kwolek	17 July 1997	1.92 m (6 ft 4 in)	91 kg (201 lb)	343 cm (135 in)	310 cm (120 in)	(Poland) ONICO Warszawa
19	Marcin Janusz	31 July 1994	1.95 m (6 ft 5 in)	85 kg (187 lb)	330 cm (130 in)	316 cm (124 in)	(Poland) Trefl Gdańsk
20	Mateusz Bieniek	5 April 1994	2.10 m (6 ft 11 in)	98 kg (216 lb)	351 cm (138 in)	326 cm (128 in)	(Poland) ZAKSA Kędzierzyn-Koźle
21	Tomasz Fornal	31 August 1997	1.98 m (6 ft 6 in)	92 kg (203 lb)	340 cm (130 in)	315 cm (124 in)	(Poland) Cerrad Czarni Radom
23	Jakub Popiwczak	17 April 1996	1.80 m (5 ft 11 in)	77 kg (170 lb)	315 cm (124 in)	300 cm (120 in)	(Poland) Jastrzębski Węgiel
25	Michal Szalacha	15 January 1994	2.02 m (6 ft 8 in)	97 kg (214 lb)	364 cm (143 in)	340 cm (130 in)	(Poland) Luczniczka Bydgoszcz
27	Piotr Łukasik	11 July 1994	2.08 m (6 ft 10 in)	112 kg (247 lb)	350 cm (140 in)	330 cm (130 in)	(Poland) ONICO Warszawa
33	Bartłomiej Lemański	19 March 1996	2.17 m (7 ft 1 in)	103 kg (227 lb)	369 cm (145 in)	345 cm (136 in)	(Poland) Asseco Resovia
77	Karol Kłos	8 August 1989	2.01 m (6 ft 7 in)	87 kg (192 lb)	357 cm (141 in)	326 cm (128 in)	(Poland) PGE Skra Bełchatów
95	Rafał Szymura	29 August 1995	1.96 m (6 ft 5 in)	93 kg (205 lb)	340 cm (130 in)	310 cm (120 in)	(Poland) ZAKSA Kędzierzyn-Koźle
99	Norbert Huber	14 August 1998	2.04 m (6 ft 8 in)	80 kg (180 lb)	351 cm (138 in)	316 cm (124 in)	(Poland) Cerrad Czarni Radom

== Russia ==
The following is the Russian roster in the 2019 FIVB Volleyball Men's World Cup.

Head coach: Tuomas Sammelvuo

No.	Name	Date of birth	Height	Weight	Spike	Block	2018–19 club
1	Yaroslav Podlesnykh	3 September 1994	1.98 m (6 ft 6 in)	89 kg (196 lb)	341 cm (134 in)	330 cm (130 in)	(Russia) Kuzbass Kemerovo
2	Ilya Vlasov	3 August 1995	2.12 m (6 ft 11 in)	98 kg (216 lb)	360 cm (140 in)	345 cm (136 in)	(Russia) Fakel Novy Urengoy
3	Dmitry Kovalyov	15 March 1991	1.98 m (6 ft 6 in)	82 kg (181 lb)	340 cm (130 in)	330 cm (130 in)	(Russia) Ural Ufa
5	Sergey Grankin (c)	21 January 1985	1.95 m (6 ft 5 in)	96 kg (212 lb)	351 cm (138 in)	320 cm (130 in)	(Germany) Berlin Recycling Volleys
8	Anton Semyshev	22 August 1997	2.01 m (6 ft 7 in)	90 kg (200 lb)	350 cm (140 in)	340 cm (130 in)	(Russia) Belogorie
9	Ivan Iakovlev	17 April 1995	2.07 m (6 ft 9 in)	89 kg (196 lb)	360 cm (140 in)	350 cm (140 in)	(Russia) Fakel Novy Urengoy
10	Fedor Voronkov	10 December 1995	2.07 m (6 ft 9 in)	85 kg (187 lb)	350 cm (140 in)	340 cm (130 in)	(Russia) NOVA Novokuybyshevsk
11	Igor Filippov	19 March 1991	2.05 m (6 ft 9 in)	107 kg (236 lb)	340 cm (130 in)	326 cm (128 in)	(Russia) Ural Ufa
14	Dmitry Shcherbinin	10 September 1989	2.05 m (6 ft 9 in)	95 kg (209 lb)	350 cm (140 in)	335 cm (132 in)	(Russia) Dynamo Moscow
16	Evgenii Andreev	6 January 1995	1.80 m (5 ft 11 in)	72 kg (159 lb)	305 cm (120 in)	295 cm (116 in)	(Russia) Gazprom-Ugra Surgut
23	Andrey Surmachevskiy	22 June 1996	1.95 m (6 ft 5 in)	85 kg (187 lb)	335 cm (132 in)	325 cm (128 in)	(Russia) Zenit Kazan
25	Pavel Kruglov	17 September 1985	2.05 m (6 ft 9 in)	98 kg (216 lb)	351 cm (138 in)	342 cm (135 in)	(Russia) Dynamo Moscow
27	Valentin Golubev	3 May 1992	1.90 m (6 ft 3 in)	70 kg (150 lb)	310 cm (120 in)	305 cm (120 in)	(Russia) Belogorie
44	Denis Zemchenok	11 August 1987	2.03 m (6 ft 8 in)	93 kg (205 lb)	350 cm (140 in)	333 cm (131 in)	(Russia) Belogorie

== Tunisia ==
The following is the Tunisian roster in the 2019 FIVB Volleyball Men's World Cup.

Head Coach: Antonio Giaccobe

No.	Name	Date of birth	Height	Weight	Spike	Block	2018–19 club
3	Khaled Ben Slimene	14 December 1994	1.93 m (6 ft 4 in)	78 kg (172 lb)	290 cm (110 in)	285 cm (112 in)	(Tunisia) E.S. Tunis
4	Aymen Redissi	5 December 1992	1.75 m (5 ft 9 in)	75 kg (165 lb)	290 cm (110 in)	270 cm (110 in)	(Tunisia) E.S. Tunis
5	Hosni Kara Mosly (c)	1 June 1980	1.97 m (6 ft 6 in)	82 kg (181 lb)	338 cm (133 in)	315 cm (124 in)	(Tunisia) E.S. Tunis
6	Mohamed Ali Ben Othmen Miladi	12 May 1991	1.88 m (6 ft 2 in)	73 kg (161 lb)	315 cm (124 in)	289 cm (114 in)	(Tunisia) E.S. Tunis
7	Elyes Karamosli	22 August 1989	1.98 m (6 ft 6 in)	99 kg (218 lb)	330 cm (130 in)	320 cm (130 in)	(Tunisia) E.S. Tunis
10	Hamza Nagga	29 May 1990	1.91 m (6 ft 3 in)	86 kg (190 lb)	335 cm (132 in)	311 cm (122 in)	(Tunisia) E.S. Sahel
11	Ismaïl Moalla	30 January 1990	1.95 m (6 ft 5 in)	87 kg (192 lb)	324 cm (128 in)	308 cm (121 in)	(Tunisia) C.S. Sfaxien
13	Selim Mbareki	6 March 1996	1.98 m (6 ft 6 in)	79 kg (174 lb)	320 cm (130 in)	305 cm (120 in)	(Tunisia) C.O. Kelibia
14	Haykel Jerbi	4 April 1988	1.99 m (6 ft 6 in)	81 kg (179 lb)	280 cm (110 in)	290 cm (110 in)	(Tunisia) E.S. Sahel
16	Mohamed Ayech	31 March 1991	1.98 m (6 ft 6 in)	86 kg (190 lb)	324 cm (128 in)	310 cm (120 in)	(Tunisia) E.S. Sahel
17	Chokri Jouini	25 April 1989	1.96 m (6 ft 5 in)	72 kg (159 lb)	355 cm (140 in)	330 cm (130 in)	(Tunisia) E.S. Tunis
18	Ali Bongui	14 August 1996	2.02 m (6 ft 8 in)	75 kg (165 lb)	225 cm (89 in)	324 cm (128 in)	(Tunisia) C.S. Sfaxien
20	Saddem Hmissi	16 February 1991	1.86 m (6 ft 1 in)	75 kg (165 lb)	312 cm (123 in)	285 cm (112 in)	(Tunisia) E.S. Tunis
22	Nabil Miladi	28 February 1988	1.96 m (6 ft 5 in)	73 kg (161 lb)	355 cm (140 in)	340 cm (130 in)	(Tunisia) E.S. Tunis

== United States ==
The following is the American roster in the 2019 FIVB Volleyball Men's World Cup.

Head coach: John Speraw

No.	Name	Date of birth	Height	Weight	Spike	Block	2018–19 club
1	Matt Anderson	18 April 1987	2.02 m (6 ft 8 in)	100 kg (220 lb)	360 cm (140 in)	332 cm (131 in)	(Russia) Zenit Kazan
2	Aaron Russell	4 June 1993	2.05 m (6 ft 9 in)	98 kg (216 lb)	356 cm (140 in)	337 cm (133 in)	(Italy) Trentino Volley
4	Jeffrey Jendryk	15 September 1995	2.08 m (6 ft 10 in)	89 kg (196 lb)	353 cm (139 in)	345 cm (136 in)	(Germany) SCC Berlin
6	Mitchell Stahl	31 August 1994	2.03 m (6 ft 8 in)	84 kg (185 lb)	350 cm (140 in)	325 cm (128 in)	(France) Paris
8	Torey Defalco	10 April 1997	1.98 m (6 ft 6 in)	95 kg (209 lb)	340 cm (130 in)	328 cm (129 in)	(United States) California State University
9	Michael Saeta	19 April 1994	1.96 m (6 ft 5 in)	77 kg (170 lb)	345 cm (136 in)	327 cm (129 in)	(France) Chaumont Volley
11	Micah Christenson (c)	8 May 1993	1.98 m (6 ft 6 in)	88 kg (194 lb)	349 cm (137 in)	340 cm (130 in)	(Italy) Modena
12	Maxwell Holt	12 March 1987	2.05 m (6 ft 9 in)	90 kg (200 lb)	351 cm (138 in)	333 cm (131 in)	(Italy) Modena
13	Benjamin Patch	21 June 1994	2.03 m (6 ft 8 in)	90 kg (200 lb)	368 cm (145 in)	348 cm (137 in)	(Germany) SCC Berlin
14	Micah Maʻa	16 April 1997	1.92 m (6 ft 4 in)	88 kg (194 lb)	333 cm (131 in)	318 cm (125 in)	(United States) UCLA
16	Joshua Tuaniga	18 March 1997	1.91 m (6 ft 3 in)	102 kg (225 lb)	320 cm (130 in)	306 cm (120 in)	(United States) Long Beach State University
18	Garrett Muagututia	26 February 1988	1.97 m (6 ft 6 in)	92 kg (203 lb)	359 cm (141 in)	345 cm (136 in)	(Greece) P.A.O.K. Thessaloniki
20	David Smith	15 May 1985	2.01 m (6 ft 7 in)	86 kg (190 lb)	348 cm (137 in)	314 cm (124 in)	(Poland) Zawiercie
22	Erik Shoji	24 August 1989	1.84 m (6 ft 0 in)	83 kg (183 lb)	330 cm (130 in)	321 cm (126 in)	(Russia) Fakel Novy Urengoy

== See also ==
- 2019 FIVB Volleyball Women's World Cup squads
