= José Martínez (volleyball) =

Mexican volleyball player (born 1993)

José Martinez
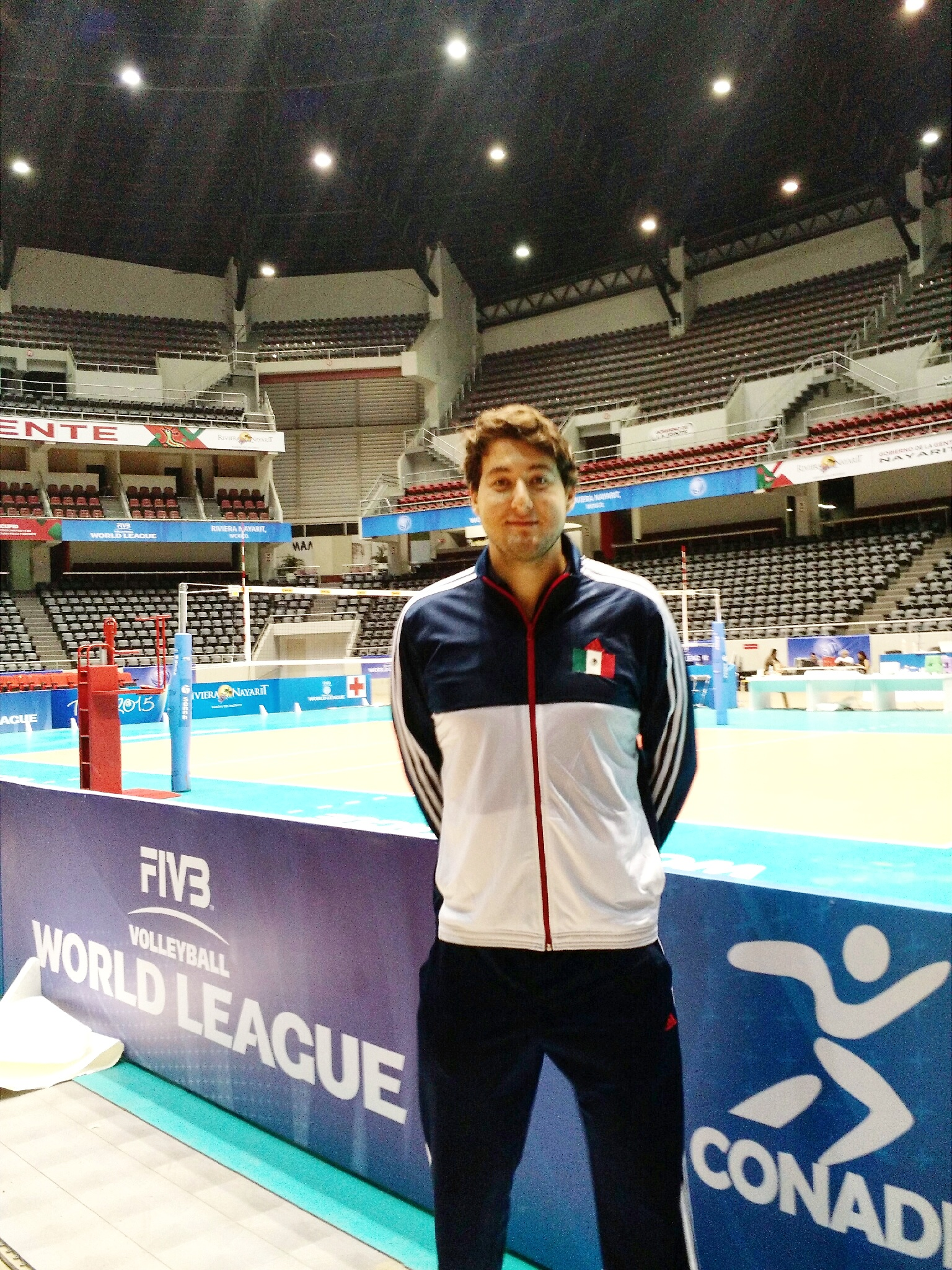

Personal information
- Full name: José Manuel Martínez Rebollar
- Nickname: El Manu
- Nationality: Mexican
- Born: 23 January 1993 (age 33); Tijuana, México
- Height: 200 cm (6 ft 7 in)
- Weight: 100 kg (220 lb)
- Spike: 349 cm (137 in)
- Block: 334 cm (131 in)
- Education: Instituto Tecnológico y de Estudios Superiores de Monterrey, Campus Ciudad de México

Volleyball information
- Position: Middle Blocker
- Number: 21

Career
| Years | Teams |
|---|---|
| 2012–2015; 2015–2017; 2017-2018; 2018-2019; 2019-2022; 2022- | (Mexico) IMSS ATN (Mexico) Virtus Guanajuato (France) Strasbourg Volley-Ball (Mexico) Virtus Guanajuato (Australia) Melbourne Vipers (Australia) WA Steel |

National team
| 2012– | Mexico |
Medal record
Representing Mexico
Men's Volleyball
U-21 NORCECA Championships
| Bronze medal – third place | 2012 Colorado Springs |
U-23 Pan-American Cup
| Silver medal – second place | 2014 Havana |
Central American and Caribbean Games
| Bronze medal – third place | 2018 Barranquilla |

Jose Martinez (born 23 January 1993) is a Mexican volleyball player. He is part of Mexico men's national volleyball team, and represented Mexico at the Olympic Games 2016 Rio. At club level he currently plays for the WA Steel, who play in the Australian Volleyball League Previously, he played for Strasbourg Volley-Ball in France.

== Early life ==
Martínez was born in Tijuana, Baja California. He attended Mater Dei Catholic High School in Chula Vista, California, where he started playing volleyball and graduated in 2011. A four-year varsity starter, he was named to the second All-Metro League team. He also lettered in water polo under coach Guy Souza.

== Career ==
During the summer of 2016, Martínez along with Mexico men's national volleyball team, ended their 48-year absence in the Olympic Games, when they secured the final place at stake for the Rio 2016 Olympic Games through the World Olympic Qualification Tournament, which took place in their home turf in Mexico City.
