= Men's U21 NORCECA Continental Championship =

Sports championship

The Men's U21 NORCECA Continental Championship is a volleyball competition for national teams, currently held biannually and organized by the NORCECA, the North America, Central America and Caribbean volleyball federation. The competition is played by men's under-21 teams.

== History ==
NORCECA Championship
Year	Host	Champion	Runner Up	3rd Place
1998; Details	Guatemala	Canada	Dominican Republic	United States
2000; Details	Cuba	Cuba	Puerto Rico	United States
2002; Details	Canada	Canada	Puerto Rico	United States
2004; Details	Canada	Cuba	United States	Puerto Rico
2006; Details	Mexico	Cuba	United States	Canada
2008; Details	El Salvador	Cuba	Canada	United States
2010; Details	Canada	United States	Canada	Puerto Rico
2012; Details	United States	United States	Canada	Mexico
2014; Details	El Salvador	Cuba	Canada	United States
2016; Details	Canada	United States	Cuba	Canada
2018; Details	Cuba	Cuba	Dominican Republic	Canada
2024; Details	Mexico	United States	Canada	Cuba

== Medal table ==
Rank	Nation	Gold	Silver	Bronze	Total
1	Cuba	6	1	1	8
2	United States	4	2	5	11
3	Canada	2	5	3	10
4	Puerto Rico	0	2	2	4
5	Dominican Republic	0	2	0	2
6	Mexico	0	0	1	1
Totals (6 entries)		12	12	12	36

== See also ==
- Women's Junior NORCECA Volleyball Championship
