= The Passport (2018 film) =

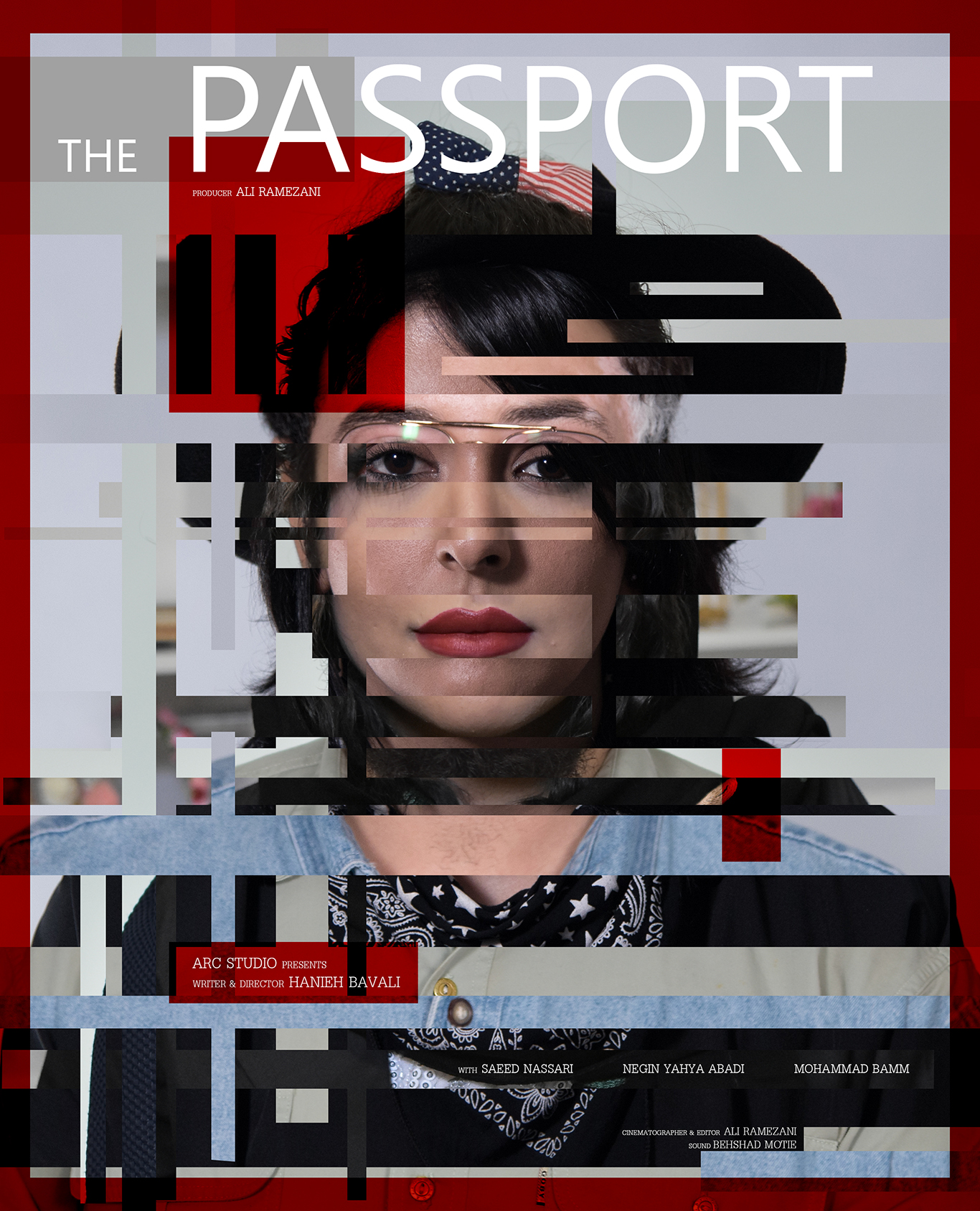
- Directed by: Hanieh Bavali
- Written by: Hanieh Bavali
- Produced by: Ali Ramezani
- Release date: 2018
- Running time: 14 minutes
- Country: Iran
- Language: Persian

The Passport is a 2018 Iranian short film written and directed by Hanieh Bavali. It won Creativity Award at A Show For A Change film festival in California and Audience award of Ongezien Kort festival in Belgium. also film was screened at many festivals in various cities of US and elsewhere.

== Plot ==
A young photographer takes passport photos of others who want to leave Iran, while he must stay.
