= Sharone Vernon-Evans =

Canadian volleyball player (born 1998)

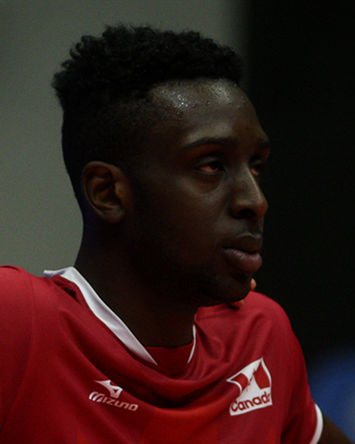
- Vernon-Evans in 2019

Personal information
- Born: 28 August 1998 (age 28); Scarborough, Ontario, Canada
- Height: 2.06 m (6 ft 9 in)
- Weight: 101 kg (223 lb)
- Spike: 382 cm (150 in)
- Block: 347 cm (137 in)

Volleyball information
- Position: Opposite

Career
Years	Teams
2017–2019; 2019–2020; 2020–2021; 2021–2025; 2025–	ONICO Warszawa; Consar Ravenna; Sir Safety Perugia; Osaka Blazers Sakai; Suwon KEPCO Vixtorm

National team
2016–2017; 2017–2021; 2025	Canada U21; Canada
Honours
Men's volleyball
Representing Canada
FIVB World League
Bronze medal – third place	2017 Curitiba
NORCECA Championship
Bronze medal – third place	2017 Colorado Springs
Bronze medal – third place	2019 Winnipeg

Sharone Vernon-Evans (born 28 August 1998) is a Canadian professional volleyball player. He is a member of the Canada men's national volleyball team and Korean club Suwon KEPCO Vixtorm.

== Personal life ==
Vernon-Evans started playing volleyball at a young age in his hometown of Scarborough, Ontario and attended Agincourt Collegiate Institute. He initially wanted to play basketball but switched to volleyball after his school's basketball team folded. He played club volleyball for the Pakmen Volleyball Club, winning multiple provincial championships and national medals. At the Team Canada tryouts, Vernon-Evans set a national record, touching 12'6.5" in the spike touch test

== Career ==
Vernon-Evans began his post high-school volleyball career with the Team Canada FTC in Gatineau. In 2017, he signed with PlusLiga club ONICO Warszawa, joining up with national team head coach Stephane Antiga.

=== National team ===
Vernon-Evans first joined the national team volleyball program in 2016 with the Canada men's junior national volleyball team. With the junior national team, he helped them to a bronze medal finish at the 2016 Men's Junior NORCECA Volleyball Championship and the 2017 Men's Junior Pan-American Volleyball Cup. In May 2017, he was announced to be a member of the Senior National Team's roster for the 2017 FIVB Volleyball World League. He helped the team to a team best finish of 3rd place in World League. Few months later Vernon-Evans was named the Best Opposite Spiker at the 2017 Norceca Championship, helping the team win bronze along the way. In June 2021, Vernon-Evans was named to Canada's 2020 Olympic team.

== Sporting achievements ==
=== National team ===
- 2016 Junior NORCECA Championship
- 2017 Junior Pan-Am Cup
- 2017 FIVB World League
- 2017 NORCECA Championship

=== Individual ===
- 2017 NORCECA Championship - Best Opposite Spiker
