= Canada men's junior national volleyball team =

Canadian volleyball team

Canada men's national junior volleyball team
Medal record

Junior NORCECA Championship
Gold medal – first place	1998 Guatemala	
Gold medal – first place	2002 Canada	
Bronze medal – third place	2006 Mexico	
Silver medal – second place	2008 El Salvador	
Silver medal – second place	2010 Canada	
Silver medal – second place	2012 United States	
Silver medal – second place	2014 El Salvador	
Bronze medal – third place	2016 Canada	

The Canada men's national junior volleyball team is the men's national under-21 volleyball team of Canada. The team is controlled by Volleyball Canada, which represents the country in international competitions - Junior NORCECA Championship and FIVB U21 World Championships. The Canadian junior national team is ranked 7th (as of September 2015) in the FIVB world ranking.

== International competitions ==
=== Junior NORCECA Championship ===
- 1998 Guatemala –– Gold medal
- 2000 Cuba –– 4th place
- 2002 Canada –– Gold medal
- 2004 Canada –– 4th place
- 2006 Mexico –– Bronze medal
- 2008 El Salvador –– Silver medal
- 2010 Canada –– Silver medal
- 2012 United States –– Silver medal
- 2014 El Salvador –– Silver medal
- 2016 Canada –– Bronze medal
- (Canada) 2018 Cuba –– Bronze medal

=== Junior Pan-American Cup ===
- 2011 Panama –– Silver medal
- 2015 Canada –– Bronze medal
- 2017 Canada –– Bronze medal
- 2019 Peru –– Silver medal
- (Cuba) 2022 CUB –– Bronze medal

=== U21 World Championship ===
- 1977 Brazil –– 10th place
- 1981 United States –– 13th place
- 1985 Italy –– Did not qualify
- 1987 Bahrain –– 12th place
- 1989 Greece — Did not qualify
- 1991 Egypt –– Did not qualify
- 1993 Argentina –– Did not qualify
- 1995 Malaysia — Did not qualify
- 1997 Bahrain — Did not qualify
- 1999 Thailand — 5th place
- 2001 Poland — Did not qualify
- 2003 Iran — 9th place
- 2005 India –– Did not qualify
- 2007 Morocco –– Did not qualify
- 2009 India — 12th place
- 2011 Brazil –– 11th place
- 2013 Turkey –– 13th place
- 2015 Mexico — 8th place
- 2017 Czech Republic - 8th place
- 2019 Bahrain - 12th place
- 2021 Italy Bulgaria - 10th place
- (Bahrain) 2023 - 11th place

== Current squad ==
The following is the Canadian roster in the 2016 Men's Junior NORCECA Volleyball Championship.

Head Coach: Gino Brousseau

No.	Name	Date of birth	Height	Weight	Spike	Block	2016 club
1	Elijah Risso	6 November 1997	1.83 m (6 ft 0 in)	70 kg (150 lb)	329 cm (130 in)	300 cm (120 in)	(Canada) UBC Okanagan Heat
2	Sharone Vernon-Evans	28 August 1998	2.02 m (6 ft 8 in)	94 kg (207 lb)	374 cm (147 in)	347 cm (137 in)	(Canada) Pakmen VBC
4	Taryq Sani	6 November 1998	1.86 m (6 ft 1 in)	84 kg (185 lb)	366 cm (144 in)	330 cm (130 in)	(Canada) Pakmen VBC
5	Eric Loeppky	1 September 1998	1.97 m (6 ft 6 in)	89 kg (196 lb)	348 cm (137 in)	325 cm (128 in)	(Canada) Winman VBC
7	Jordan Pereira	8 March 1998	1.83 m (6 ft 0 in)	72 kg (159 lb)	323 cm (127 in)	297 cm (117 in)	(Canada) Pakmen VBC
9	Matthew Mawdsley (C)	21 January 1997	2.08 m (6 ft 10 in)	90 kg (200 lb)	350 cm (140 in)	328 cm (129 in)	(Canada) LVC Fire
10	Pearson Eshenko	16 October 1997	2.04 m (6 ft 8 in)	96 kg (212 lb)	360 cm (140 in)	336 cm (132 in)	(Canada) Trinity Western Spartans
11	Cristopher Jay Gavlas	22 April 1997	1.83 m (6 ft 0 in)	70 kg (150 lb)	340 cm (130 in)	313 cm (123 in)	(Canada) Saskatchewan Huskies
13	Matthew Passalent	8 June 1997	1.95 m (6 ft 5 in)	82 kg (181 lb)	351 cm (138 in)	332 cm (131 in)	(Canada) McMaster Marauders
14	Derek Epp	15 June 1998	1.96 m (6 ft 5 in)	88 kg (194 lb)	335 cm (132 in)	315 cm (124 in)	(Canada) Junior Huskies
15	Jacob Kern	26 August 1997	2.00 m (6 ft 7 in)	87 kg (192 lb)	346 cm (136 in)	324 cm (128 in)	(Canada) Trinity Western Spartans
16	Daenan Gyimah	16 January 1998	1.99 m (6 ft 6 in)	75 kg (165 lb)	372 cm (146 in)	339 cm (133 in)	(Canada) STVC Nemesis
