= Miguel Gutiérrez (volleyball) =

Cuban volleyball player (born 1997)

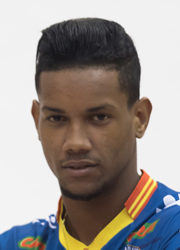
- Gutiérrez in 2018

Personal information
- Full name: Miguel David Gutiérrez Suárez
- Nickname: Metralla ("Shrapnel")
- Born: 21 February 1997 (age 29); Villa Clara, Cuba
- Height: 1.99 m (6 ft 6 in)
- Weight: 96 kg (212 lb)
- Spike: 363 cm (143 in)
- Block: 355 cm (140 in)

Volleyball information
- Position: Opposite
- Current club: Modena voley
- Number: 10 (national team)

Career
Years	Teams
2015–2017; 2017–2018; 2018–2019; 2021–2022; 2022–present	Villa Clara; Bunge Ravenna; Gigantes del Sur; Al-Kweldeh; Volley Prata

National team
2016–present	Cuba
Honours
Men's volleyball
Representing Cuba
Pan-American Cup
Gold medal – first place	2022 Gatineau
U19 Pan-American Volleyball Cup
Gold medal – first place	2019 Dominican Republic
U19 Norceca Championship
Silver medal – second place	2014 United States
U21 Norceca Championship
Gold medal – first place	2014 El Salvador
Silver medal – second place	2016 Canada
U21 Pan-American Cup
Silver medal – second place	2017 Canada
U23 Pan-American Cup
Silver medal – second place	2016 Mexico
U21 World Championship
Silver medal – second place	2017 Czech Republic
U23 World Championship
Bronze medal – third place	2017 Egypt

Miguel David Gutiérrez Suárez (born 21 February 1997) is a Cuban volleyball player. He is part of the Cuba men's national volleyball team. On club level he plays for Volley Prata.

== Sporting achievements ==
=== Clubs ===
==== CEV Challenge Cup ====
- 2017/2018 – with Bunge Ravenna
