= 2017 Men's Junior Pan-American Volleyball Cup =

Tournament details
- Host country: Canada
- Dates: May 16 – 21, 2017
- Teams: 7
- Venue: 1 (in Fort McMurray host cities)

Final positions
- Champions: Brazil (2nd title)

Tournament awards
- MVP: Victor Cardoso (BRA)

The 2017 Men's Junior Pan-American Volleyball Cup was the third edition of the bi-annual men's volleyball tournament. Seven teams participated in this edition held in Fort McMurray.

== Competing nations ==
Group A	Group B
Cuba; Chile; Puerto Rico	Brazil; Barbados; Canada; Guatemala

== Competition format ==
- Seven teams will be divided into two pools. In the group stage each pool will play round robin.
- The first rank teams of each pool after group stage will receive byes into the semifinals.
- The second and third rank teams in each pool will play in the quarterfinals.

== Preliminary round ==
- All times are in Canada Standard Time (UTC−06:00)

=== Group A ===
Pos	Team	Pld	W	L	Pts	SPW	SPL	SPR	SW	SL	SR	Qualification
1	Cuba	2	2	0	10	150	90	1.667	6	0	MAX	Semifinals
2	Puerto Rico	2	1	1	4	145	143	1.014	3	4	0.750	Quarterfinals
3	Chile	2	0	2	1	111	173	0.642	1	6	0.167	Quarterfinals

Date	Time		Score		Set 1	Set 2	Set 3	Set 4	Set 5	Total	Report
16 May	12:00	Cuba	3–0	Chile	25–11	25–17	25–15			75–43	P2 P3
17 May	16:00	Chile	1–3	Puerto Rico	25–23	12–25	21–25	10–25		68–98	P2 P3
18 May	16:00	Cuba	3–0	Puerto Rico	25–15	25–12	25–20			75–47	P2 P3

=== Group B ===
Pos	Team	Pld	W	L	Pts	SPW	SPL	SPR	SW	SL	SR	Qualification
1	Brazil	3	3	0	14	246	143	1.720	9	1	9.000	Semifinals
2	Canada	3	2	1	11	226	191	1.183	7	3	2.333	Quarterfinals
3	Guatemala	3	1	2	4	191	243	0.786	3	7	0.429	Quarterfinals
4	Barbados	3	0	3	1	172	258	0.667	1	9	0.111	

Date	Time		Score		Set 1	Set 2	Set 3	Set 4	Set 5	Total	Report
16 May	18:00	Brazil	3–0	Barbados	25–12	25–8	25–12			75–32	P2 P3
16 May	20:00	Canada	3–0	Guatemala	25–16	25–17	25–15			75–48	P2 P3
17 May	18:30	Guatemala	0–3	Brazil	14–25	10–25	11–25			35–75	P2 P3
17 May	20:00	Canada	3–0	Barbados	25–14	25–17	25–16			75–47	P2 P3
18 May	18:00	Barbados	1–3	Guatemala	32–34	26–24	14–25	21–25		93–108	P2 P3
18 May	20:00	Canada	1–3	Brazil	17–25	25–21	20–25	14–25		76–96	P2 P3

== Final round ==
=== Championship bracket ===
Quarterfinals
A2	Puerto Rico	2
B3	Guatemala	3
B2	Canada	3
A3	Chile	1

Semifinals
B1	Brazil	3
B3	Guatemala	0
A1	Cuba	3
B2	Canada	1

Finals
B1	Brazil	3
A1	Cuba	1
Third place
B3	Guatemala	0
B2	Canada	3

=== Quarterfinals ===
Date	Time		Score		Set 1	Set 2	Set 3	Set 4	Set 5	Total	Report
19 May	18:00	Puerto Rico	2–3	Guatemala	13–25	25–22	21–25	25–22	14–16	98–110	P2 P3
19 May	20:00	Canada	3–1	Chile	25–15	25–18	22–25	25–10		97–68	P2 P3

=== 5th place match ===
Date	Time		Score		Set 1	Set 2	Set 3	Set 4	Set 5	Total	Report
20 May	14:00	Puerto Rico	3–0	Chile	25–22	25–14	25–18			75–54	P2 P3

=== Semifinals ===
Date	Time		Score		Set 1	Set 2	Set 3	Set 4	Set 5	Total	Report
20 May	16:00	Brazil	3–0	Guatemala	25–10	25–16	25–20			75–46	P2 P3
20 May	18:00	Cuba	3–1	Canada	19–25	25–22	25–18	25–19		94–84	P2 P3

=== 6th place match ===
Date	Time		Score		Set 1	Set 2	Set 3	Set 4	Set 5	Total	Report
21 May	14:00	Barbados	0–3	Chile	20–25	18–25	17–25			55–75	P2 P3

=== 3rd place match ===
Date	Time		Score		Set 1	Set 2	Set 3	Set 4	Set 5	Total	Report
21 May	16:00	Guatemala	0–3	Canada	15–25	17–25	19–25			51–75	P2 P3

=== Final ===
Date	Time		Score		Set 1	Set 2	Set 3	Set 4	Set 5	Total	Report
21 May	18:00	Brazil	3–1	Cuba	25–23	17–25	25–18	25–18		92–84	P2 P3

== Final standing ==
Rank	Team
1st place, gold medalist(s)	Brazil
2nd place, silver medalist(s)	Cuba
3rd place, bronze medalist(s)	Canada
4	Guatemala
5	Puerto Rico
6	Chile
7	Barbados

Qualified for FIVB U21 World Championship

2017 Men's Junior Pan-American Cup champions

Brazil
2nd title

== Individual awards ==
- Most valuable player
  - Victor Cardoso (BRA)
- Best scorer
  - Eric Loeppky (CAN)
- Best setter
  - Adrián Goide (CUB)
- Best Opposite
  - Miguel Gutiérrez (CUB)
- Best Outside Hitters
  - Miguel Ángel López (CUB)
  - Henrique Honorato (BRA)
- Best Middle Blockers
  - Javier Concepción (CUB)
  - Fynn McCarthy (CAN)
- Best libero
  - Lucas Lavín (CHI)
- Best server
  - Miguel Gutiérrez (CUB)
- Best receiver
  - Jordan Pereira (CAN)
- Best digger
  - Lionnis Salazar (CUB)
