= Ryley Barnes =

Canadian volleyball player (born 1993)

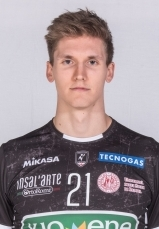
- Barnes in 2019

Personal information
- Full name: Ryley Brendan Barnes
- Nationality: (Canada) Canadian
- Born: 11 October 1993 (age 33) Edmonton, Alberta, Canada
- Home town: St. Paul, Alberta
- Education: University of Alberta
- Height: 2.00 m (6 ft 7 in)
- Weight: 92 kg (203 lb)
- Spike: 348 cm (137 in)
- Block: 325 cm (128 in)

Volleyball information
- Position: Outside hitter
- Current club: (Greece) PAOK Thessaloniki

Career
- Years: Team
- 2011–2016 2016–2017 2017–2018 2018–2020 2022–: (Canada) Alberta Golden Bears (France) Tours VB (Russia) Ural Ufa (Italy) Kioene Padova (Greece) PAOK Thessaloniki

National team
- Years: Team
- 2016–: Canada
Honours
Representing Canada
Men's volleyball
FIVB World League
Bronze medal – third place	2017 Curitiba

Ryley Brendan Barnes (born 11 October 1993) is a Canadian volleyball player. He is a member of the Canada men's national volleyball team and Greek club PAOK Thessaloniki.

== Career ==
Ryley Barnes began his post-secondary volleyball career with the Alberta Golden Bears in 2011. He went on to spend 5 years at the club, helping the team win back to back CIS championships in 2014 and 2015, in addition to being named CIS MVP for the 2013-14 season. In 2016, he signed with French team Tours VB.

=== National team ===
Ryley first joined the national team program in 2012, helping the team win silver at the 2012 NORCECA U21 Championship and qualify for the 2013 FIVB U21 World Championship.

He joined the senior national team in 2017, being named to Canada's 2017 FIVB World League team.

== Sporting achievements ==
=== College ===
- National championships
  - 2013/2014 CIS Championship, with Alberta Golden Bears
  - 2014/2015 CIS Championship, with Alberta Golden Bears
  - 2015/2016 CIS Championship, with Alberta Golden Bears

=== Clubs ===
- CEV Cup
  - 2016/2017 – with Tours VB

=== National team ===
- 2012 NORCECA U21 Championship
- 2016 Pan-American Cup
- 2017 FIVB World League
- 2019 NORCECA Champions Cup

=== Individually ===
- 2014: CIS Championship – Tournament All-Stars (Most Valuable Player)
- 2015: CIS Championship – Tournament All-Stars
- 2016: CIS Championship – Tournament All-Stars
