= 2014 Men's Junior NORCECA Volleyball Championship =

Volleyball Championship

2014 Men's Junior NORCECA Championship
Tournament details
- Host country: El Salvador
- Dates: July 29 – August 3
- Teams: 10
- Venue: 1 (in San Salvador host cities)

Final positions
- Champions: Cuba (5th title)
- Runners-up: Canada
- Third place: United States

Tournament awards
- MVP: Ricardo Calvo (CUB)

The 2014 Men's Junior NORCECA Volleyball Championship was the ninth edition of the bi-annual volleyball tournament, played by ten countries from July 29 – August 3, 2014 in San Salvador, El Salvador. Cuba won their 5th championship. Cuba, Canada and United States also qualify for the 2015 Men's Junior World Championship.

== Competing nations ==
Group A	Group B	Group C
Barbados; El Salvador; Honduras	Puerto Rico; Saint Lucia; Canada	Cuba; Nicaragua; Mexico; United States

== Pool standing procedure ==
Match won 3–0: 5 points for the winner, 0 point for the loser
Match won 3–1: 4 points for the winner, 1 points for the loser
Match won 3–2: 3 points for the winner, 2 points for the loser
In case of tie, the teams were classified according to the following criteria:
points ratio and sets ratio.

== First round ==
=== Pool A ===
Pos	Team	Pld	W	L	Pts	SPW	SPL	SPR	SW	SL	SR	Qualification
1	Barbados	2	2	0	8	187	167	1.120	6	2	3.000	Quarterfinals
2	El Salvador	2	1	1	5	180	178	1.011	4	4	1.000	Quarterfinals
3	Honduras	2	0	2	2	172	194	0.887	2	6	0.333	

Date	Time		Score		Set 1	Set 2	Set 3	Set 4	Set 5	Total	Report
29-jul	20:00	Barbados	3–1	El Salvador	25–21	15–25	25–17	25–20		90–83	P2P3
30-jul	18:00	Honduras	1–3	Barbados	25–22	18–25	22–25	19–25		84–97	P2P3
31-jul	20:00	El Salvador	3–1	Honduras	22–25	25–21	25–23	25–19		97–88	P2P3

=== Pool B ===
Pos	Team	Pld	W	L	Pts	SPW	SPL	SPR	SW	SL	SR	Qualification
1	Canada	2	2	0	8	188	133	1.414	6	2	3.000	Semifinals
2	Puerto Rico	2	1	1	7	183	150	1.220	5	3	1.667	Quarterfinals
3	Saint Lucia	2	0	2	0	62	150	0.413	0	6	0.000	

Date	Time		Score		Set 1	Set 2	Set 3	Set 4	Set 5	Total	Report
29-jul	16:00	Puerto Rico	3–0	Saint Lucia	25–10	25–15	25–12			75–37	P2P3
30-jul	16:00	Saint Lucia	0–3	Canada	10–25	7–25	8–25			25–75	P2P3
31-jul	16:00	Canada	3–2	Puerto Rico	25–23	25–27	25–23	23–25	15–10	113–108	P2P3

=== Pool C ===
Pos	Team	Pld	W	L	Pts	SPW	SPL	SPR	SW	SL	SR	Qualification
1	Cuba	3	3	0	14	248	145	1.710	9	1	9.000	Semifinals
2	United States	3	2	1	9	214	195	1.097	6	4	1.500	Quarterfinals
3	Mexico	3	1	2	7	221	231	0.957	5	6	0.833	
4	Nicaragua	3	0	3	0	113	225	0.502	0	9	0.000	

Date	Time		Score		Set 1	Set 2	Set 3	Set 4	Set 5	Total	Report
29-jul	14:00	United States	3–0	Nicaragua	25–12	25–13	25–20			75–45	P2P3
29-jul	18:00	Mexico	1–3	Cuba	17–25	13–25	25–23	16–25		71–98	P2P3
30-jul	14:00	Nicaragua	0–3	Mexico	11–25	19–25	11–25			41–75	P2P3
30-jul	20:00	United States	0–3	Cuba	13–25	16–25	18–25			47–75	P2P3
31-jul	14:00	Cuba	3–0	Nicaragua	25–6	25–10	25–11			75–27	P2P3
31-jul	18:00	United States	3–1	Mexico	25–18	25–21	17–25	25–11		92–75	P2P3

== Final round ==
=== Championship bracket ===
Quarterfinals
A1	Barbados	0
B2	Puerto Rico	3
C2	United States	3
A2	El Salvador	0

Semifinals
C1	Cuba	3
B2	Puerto Rico	0
B1	Canada	3
C2	United States	2
Classification 5–6
A1	Barbados	1
A2	El Salvador	3

Finals
C1	Cuba	3
B1	Canada	0
Classification 3–4
B2	Puerto Rico	0
C2	United States	3

=== Classification 9 ===
Date	Time		Score		Set 1	Set 2	Set 3	Set 4	Set 5	Total	Report
1-Aug	15:00	Honduras	3–0	Saint Lucia	25–10	25–10	25–19			75–39	P2P3

=== Quarterfinals ===
Date	Time		Score		Set 1	Set 2	Set 3	Set 4	Set 5	Total	Report
1-Aug	17:00	United States	3–0	El Salvador	25–15	25–21	25–18			75–54	P2P3
1-Aug	19:00	Barbados	0–3	Puerto Rico	13–25	18–25	12–25			43–75	P2P3

=== Classification 7-8 ===
Date	Time		Score		Set 1	Set 2	Set 3	Set 4	Set 5	Total	Report
2-Aug	15:00	Mexico	3–0	Honduras	25–17	25–15	25–20			75–52	P2P3

=== Semifinals ===
Date	Time		Score		Set 1	Set 2	Set 3	Set 4	Set 5	Total	Report
2-Aug	17:00	Canada	3–2	United States	23–25	25–14	20–25	25–22	15–9	108–95	P2P3
2-Aug	19:00	Cuba	3–0	Puerto Rico	25–19	25–18	25–19			75–56	P2P3

=== Classification 5-6 ===
Date	Time		Score		Set 1	Set 2	Set 3	Set 4	Set 5	Total	Report
3-Aug	15:00	El Salvador	3–1	Barbados	25–21	21–25	25–18	25–22		96–86	P2P3

=== Classification 3-4 ===
Date	Time		Score		Set 1	Set 2	Set 3	Set 4	Set 5	Total	Report
3-Aug	17:00	United States	3–0	Puerto Rico	26–24	25–19	27–25			78–68	P2P3

=== Final ===
Date	Time		Score		Set 1	Set 2	Set 3	Set 4	Set 5	Total	Report
3-Aug	19:00	Canada	0–3	Cuba	27–29	21–25	21–25			69–79	P2P3

== Final standing ==
Rank	Team
1st place, gold medalist(s)	Cuba
2nd place, silver medalist(s)	Canada
3rd place, bronze medalist(s)	United States
4	Puerto Rico
5	El Salvador
6	Barbados
7	Mexico
8	Honduras
9	Saint Lucia
10	Nicaragua

== All-Star Team ==
- Most valuable player
  - Ricardo Calvo (CUB)
- Best setter
  - Ricardo Calvo (CUB)
- Best Opposite
  - Samuel Valdez (ESA)
- Best Outside Hitters
  - Osmany Uriarte (CUB)
  - Brandon Koppers (CAN)
- Best Middle Blockers
  - Jose Mejia (ESA)
  - Luis Sosa (CUB)
- Best libero
  - Juan Napky (HON)
