= Hanieh Bavali =

Iranian filmmaker

- هانیه بوالی
- Born: 22 February 1990 (age 35); Abadan, Iran
- Occupations: Film director; screenwriter
- Years active: 2018-present
- Notable work: The Passport (Iranian film)

Hanieh Bavali (Persian: هانیه بوالی, born 1990 in Abadan) is an Iranian female filmmaker and screenwriter.

She is most known for her first short film The Passport, which won the Creativity Award at A Show For A Change film festival in California and the Audience award of Ongezien Kort festival in Belgium.
