= 2018 Men's Junior NORCECA Volleyball Championship =

Tournament details
- Host country: Cuba
- Dates: 25 August–2 September
- Teams: 8
- Venue: 1 (in 1 host city)

Final positions
- Champions: Cuba (6th title)

Tournament awards
- MVP: José Carlos Romero (CUB)

The 2018 Men's Junior Continental Championship is the eleventh edition of the bi-annual tournament, played by eight countries from 25 August–2 September 2018 in Havana, Cuba. The top finisher at the final standing will qualify to 2019 U-21 World Championship.

== Pool composition ==
Group A	Group B
Cuba; Guatemala; Barbados; Dominican Republic	Canada; United States; Nicaragua; Haiti

== Pool standing procedure ==
Match won 3–0: 5 points for the winner, 0 point for the loser
Match won 3–1: 4 points for the winner, 1 points for the loser
Match won 3–2: 3 points for the winner, 2 points for the loser
In case of tie, the teams were classified according to the following criteria:
points ratio and sets ratio.

== Preliminary round ==
- Venue: Coliseo de la Ciudad Deportiva, Havana, Cuba
- All times are Cuba Daylight Time (UTC−04:00).

=== Pool A ===
Pos	Team	Pld	W	L	Pts	SPW	SPL	SPR	SW	SL	SR	Qualification
1	Cuba	3	3	0	15	226	148	1.527	9	0	MAX	Semifinals
2	Dominican Republic	3	2	1	10	209	200	1.045	6	3	2.000	Quarterfinals
3	Barbados	3	1	2	4	199	242	0.822	3	7	0.429	Quarterfinals
4	Guatemala	3	0	3	1	204	248	0.823	1	9	0.111	

Date	Time		Score		Set 1	Set 2	Set 3	Set 4	Set 5	Total	Report
27 Aug	12:00	Barbados	0–3	Dominican Republic	21–25	21–25	18–25			60–75	P2 P3
27 Aug	18:00	Cuba	3–0	Guatemala	25–17	25–18	25–13			75–48	P2 P3
28 Aug	12:00	Dominican Republic	3–0	Guatemala	25–23	25–19	25–22			75–64	P2 P3
28 Aug	18:00	Cuba	3–0	Barbados	25–13	25–17	25–11			75–41	P2 P3
29 Aug	12:00	Guatemala	1–3	Barbados	27–29	25–19	23–25	17–25		92–98	P2 P3
29 Aug	18:00	Cuba	3–0	Dominican Republic	26–24	25–18	25–17			76–59	P2 P3

=== Pool B ===
Pos	Team	Pld	W	L	Pts	SPW	SPL	SPR	SW	SL	SR	Qualification
1	United States	3	3	0	14	249	194	1.284	9	1	9.000	Semifinals
2	Canada	3	2	1	11	236	199	1.186	7	3	2.333	Quarterfinals
3	Nicaragua	3	1	2	4	196	225	0.871	3	7	0.429	Quarterfinals
4	Haiti	3	0	3	1	179	242	0.740	1	9	0.111	

Date	Time		Score		Set 1	Set 2	Set 3	Set 4	Set 5	Total	Report
27 Aug	14:00	Canada	3–0	Haiti	25–14	25–17	25–18			75–49	P2 P3
27 Aug	16:00	United States	3–0	Nicaragua	25–23	25–15	25–15			75–53	P2 P3
28 Aug	14:00	Canada	3–0	Nicaragua	25–16	25–20	25–15			75–51	P2 P3
28 Aug	16:00	United States	3–0	Haiti	25–20	25–18	25–17			75–55	P2 P3
29 Aug	14:00	Nicaragua	3–1	Haiti	25–17	17–25	25–20	25–13		92–75	P2 P3
29 Aug	16:00	Canada	1–3	United States	14–25	25–23	23–25	24–26		86–99	P2 P3

== Final round ==
=== Quarterfinals ===
Date	Time		Score		Set 1	Set 2	Set 3	Set 4	Set 5	Total	Report
30 Aug	14:00	Dominican Republic	3–0	Nicaragua	25–23	25–19	25–17			75–59	P2 P3
30 Aug	16:00	Canada	3–0	Barbados	25–13	25–14	25–20			75–47	P2 P3

=== Classification 5–8 ===
Date	Time		Score		Set 1	Set 2	Set 3	Set 4	Set 5	Total	Report
31 Aug	12:00	Guatemala	3–0	Nicaragua	25–22	25–21	25–16			75–59	P2 P3
31 Aug	14:00	Haiti	3–2	Barbados	14–25	25–23	18–25	31–29	15–10	103–112	P2 P3

=== Semifinals ===
Date	Time		Score		Set 1	Set 2	Set 3	Set 4	Set 5	Total	Report
31 Aug	16:00	United States	1–3	Dominican Republic	25–21	23–25	24–26	18–25		90–97	P2 P3
31 Aug	18:00	Cuba	3–1	Canada	21–25	25–21	25–18	25–18		96–82	P2 P3

=== 7th Place ===
Date	Time		Score		Set 1	Set 2	Set 3	Set 4	Set 5	Total	Report
1 Sep	12:00	Nicaragua	3–0	Barbados	25–18	25–23	25–14			75–55	P2 P3

=== 5th Place ===
Date	Time		Score		Set 1	Set 2	Set 3	Set 4	Set 5	Total	Report
1 Sep	14:00	Guatemala	3–0	Haiti	25–16	25–16	25–19			75–51	P2 P3

=== 3rd Place ===
Date	Time		Score		Set 1	Set 2	Set 3	Set 4	Set 5	Total	Report
1 Sep	16:00	Canada	3–1	United States	25–22	25–23	25–27	25–17		100–89	P2 P3

=== Final ===
Date	Time		Score		Set 1	Set 2	Set 3	Set 4	Set 5	Total	Report
1 Sep	18:00	Cuba	3–0	Dominican Republic	25–16	25–15	25–20			75–51	P2 P3

== Final standing ==
Qualified to 2019 U-21 World Championship

Rank	Team
1st place, gold medalist(s)	Cuba
2nd place, silver medalist(s)	Dominican Republic
3rd place, bronze medalist(s)	Canada
4	United States
5	Guatemala
6	Haiti
7	Nicaragua
8	Barbados
