= Jordan Pereira (volleyball) =

Canadian volleyball player (born 1997)

Personal information
- Nationality: Uruguayan
- Born: July 21, 1998 (age 28)
- Hometown: Chuy, Rocha
- Height: 1.83 m (6 ft 0 in)
- Weight: 72 kg (159 lb)
- Spike: 323 cm (127 in)
- Block: 297 cm (117 in)
- Education: McMaster University

Volleyball information
- Position: Libero
- Current club: (Canada) McMaster University
- Number: 7

Career
Years	Teams
2016–	(Canada) McMaster University

National team
2016	Canada U21
- Last updated: 18 February 2018

Jordan Pereira (born 21 July 1998) is a Uruguayan-born Canadian male volleyball player. He was a member of the Canada men's junior national volleyball team at the 2016 Men's Junior NORCECA Volleyball Championship.

== Sporting achievements ==
=== Individual awards ===
- 2016 Junior NORCECA Championship - Best Receiver
- 2016 Junior NORCECA Championship - Best Digger
- 2016 Junior NORCECA Championship - Best Libero
- 2017 U-21 Pan-American Cup - Best Receiver
