= Ricardo Calvo (volleyball) =

Cuban volleyball player (born 1996)

Personal information
- Full name: Ricardo Norberto Calvo Manzano
- Nationality: Cuban
- Born: 2 October 1996 (age 30)
- Height: 1.93 m (6 ft 4 in)
- Weight: 74 kg (163 lb)
- Spike: 343 cm (135 in)
- Block: 334 cm (131 in)

Volleyball information
- Position: Setter
- Current club: (Serbia) Partizan
- Number: 3 (national team); 12 (club)

Career
Years	Teams
2014–2016; 2016; 2018–2019; 2020–2021; 2021–2022; 2022–2023; 2023–2024; 2024–	(Cuba) Villa Clara (Greece) PAOK (Lebanon) Zahra Club (Serbia) Spartak Subotica (Serbia) Radnički Kragujevac (China) Shanghai Bright (Turkey) Develi Belediyespor (Serbia) Partizan

National team
2014–2016	Cuba

Ricardo Norberto Calvo Manzano (born 2 October 1996), commonly referred to as Ricardo Calvo, is a Cuban male volleyball player. Calvo was part of the Cuba men's national volleyball team at the 2014 FIVB World Championship in Poland. On club level, he played for Villa Clara.

Calvo did not play in the 2016 Summer Olympics in Rio de Janeiro because he was one of six players of the Cuban national volleyball team that were suspected of committing aggravated rape in July 2016 in Tampere, Finland. In September 2016, he was sentenced to five years in prison. In June 2017, his sentence was reduced to 3 1/2 years.

== Clubs ==
- Villa Clara (2014–2016)
- PAOK (2016)
- Zahra Club (2018–2019)
- Spartak Subotica (2020–2021)
- Radnički Kragujevac (2021–2022)
- Shanghai Bright (2022–2023)
- Develi Belediyespor (2023–2024)
- Partizan (2024–present)
