= Benjamin Patch =

American volleyball player (born 1994)

Ben Patch
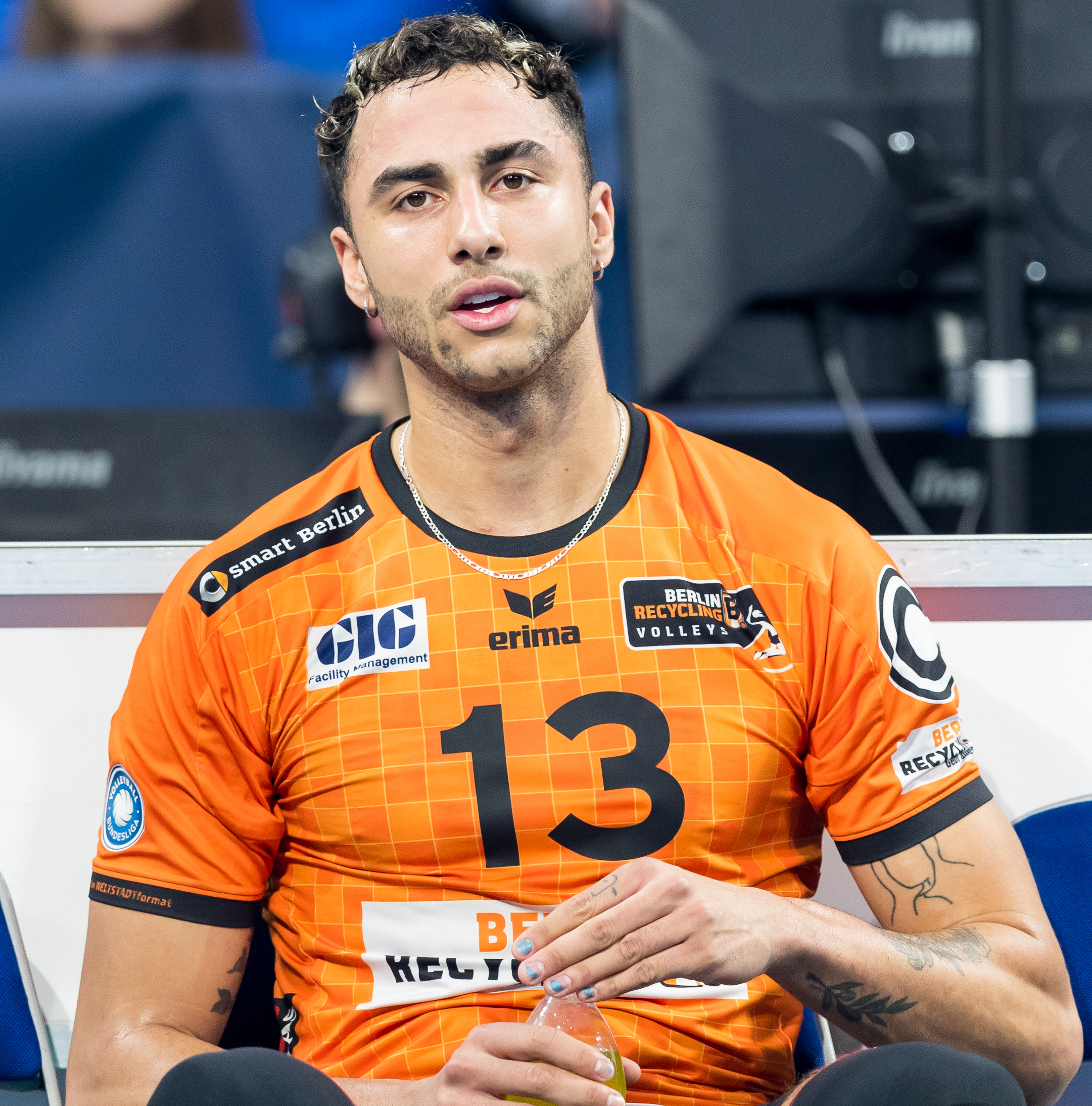
- Patch in 2020

Personal information
- Full name: Benjamin Patch
- Born: June 21, 1994 (age 32); Layton, Utah, U.S.
- Hometown: Provo, Utah, U.S.
- Height: 6 ft 8 in (2.03 m)
- Weight: 198 lb (90 kg)
- Spike: 150 in (382 cm)
- Block: 141 in (358 cm)
- Education: Brigham Young University

Volleyball information
- Position: Opposite
- Number: 13

Career
Years	Teams
2013; 2016–2017; 2017–2018; 2018–2022	BYU Cougars; BYU Cougars; Volley Callipo; Berlin Recycling Volleys

National team
2015–2021	United States
Medal record
Men's volleyball
Representing United States
FIVB World Championship
Bronze medal – third place	2018 Italy/Bulgaria
FIVB World Cup
Bronze medal – third place	2019 Japan
FIVB Nations League
Silver medal – second place	2019 Chicago
Bronze medal – third place	2018 Lille
NORCECA Championship
Gold medal – first place	2017 United States

Benjamin Patch (born June 21, 1994) is an American former volleyball player who played for the United States national volleyball team. Patch helped the United States national team win the gold medal at the 2017 NORCECA Championship.

== Personal life ==
Patch was raised by white, Mormon adoptive parents in Utah, and he served as a missionary in Columbus, Ohio, for one year.

In October 2020, Patch publicly came out as queer in the German publication Der Tagesspiegel. He became the first openly queer active player in a German men's professional sports league.

Patch maintains an active ceramic art practice and a photography business alongside his professional volleyball career.

== Sporting achievements ==
=== College ===
- National championships
  - 2013 NCAA national championship, with BYU Cougars
  - 2016 NCAA national championship, with BYU Cougars
  - 2017 NCAA national championship, with BYU Cougars

=== Clubs ===
- National championships
  - 2018/2019 German Championship, with Berlin Recycling Volleys
  - 2019/2020 German SuperCup, with Berlin Recycling Volleys
  - 2019/2020 German Cup, with Berlin Recycling Volleys
  - 2021/2022 German SuperCup, with Berlin Recycling Volleys
  - 2021/2022 German Championship, with Berlin Recycling Volleys

=== Youth national team ===
- 2012 NORCECA U21 Championship

=== Individual awards ===
- 2012: NORCECA U21 Championship – Most Valuable Player
- 2013: NCAA national championship – All-Tournament Team
