= 2016 Men's Junior NORCECA Volleyball Championship =

Tournament details
- Host country: Canada
- Dates: 5–10 July
- Teams: 7
- Venue: Centre Sportif de Gatineau (in 1 host city)

Final positions
- Champions: United States (3rd title)

Tournament awards
- MVP: Joshua Tuaniga (USA)

The 2016 Men's Junior Continental Championship is the tenth edition of the bi-annual tournament. It is played from 5–10 July on Gatineau, Quebec. The tournament will consist of seven teams. The top finisher at the final standing will qualify to 2017 U-21 World Championship.

== Pool composition ==
Teams are distributed using the Serpentine system according NORCECA U-21 Ranking as of January 1, 2016

Pool A	Pool B
United States (2); Barbados (6); Saint Vincent (8)	Canada (Host - 1); Cuba (3); Guatemala (12); Trinidad and Tobago (14)

== Pool standing procedure ==
Match won 3–0: 5 points for the winner, 0 point for the loser
Match won 3–1: 4 points for the winner, 1 points for the loser
Match won 3–2: 3 points for the winner, 2 points for the loser
In case of tie, the teams were classified according to the following criteria:
points ratio and sets ratio.

== Preliminary round ==
All times are in Eastern Daylight Time–(UTC-04:00)

=== Pool A ===
Pos	Team	Pld	W	L	Pts	SPW	SPL	SPR	SW	SL	SR	Qualification
1	United States	2	2	0	10	150	79	1.899	6	0	MAX	Semifinals
2	Barbados	2	1	1	5	121	134	0.903	3	3	1.000	Quarterfinals
3	Saint Vincent	2	0	2	0	92	150	0.613	0	6	0.000	Quarterfinals

Date	Time		Score		Set 1	Set 2	Set 3	Set 4	Set 5	Total	Report
5 Jul	16:00	United States	3–0	Barbados	25–15	25–15	25–16			75–46	P2 P3
6 Jul	16:00	Barbados	3–0	Saint Vincent	25–23	25–19	25–17			75–59	P2 P3
7 Jul	16:00	Saint Vincent	0–3	United States	11–25	12–25	10–25			33–75	P2 P3

=== Pool B ===
Pos	Team	Pld	W	L	Pts	SPW	SPL	SPR	SW	SL	SR	Qualification
1	Cuba	3	3	0	15	225	132	1.705	9	0	MAX	Semifinals
2	Canada	3	2	1	10	201	166	1.211	6	3	2.000	Quarterfinals
3	Guatemala	3	1	2	5	164	200	0.820	3	6	0.500	Quarterfinals
4	Trinidad and Tobago	3	0	3	0	133	225	0.591	0	9	0.000	

Date	Time		Score		Set 1	Set 2	Set 3	Set 4	Set 5	Total	Report
5 Jul	18:00	Trinidad and Tobago	0–3	Cuba	15–25	6–25	16–25			37–75	P2 P3
5 Jul	20:00	Canada	3–0	Guatemala	25–12	25–18	25–15			75–45	P2 P3
6 Jul	18:00	Cuba	3–0	Guatemala	25–17	25–17	25–10			75–44	P2 P3
6 Jul	20:00	Canada	3–0	Trinidad and Tobago	25–19	25–9	25–18			75–46	P2 P3
7 Jul	18:00	Guatemala	3–0	Trinidad and Tobago	25–21	25–12	25–17			75–50	P2 P3
7 Jul	20:00	Canada	0–3	Cuba	17–25	18–25	16–25			51–75	P2 P3

== Final round ==
=== Bracket ===
Quarterfinals
B2	Canada	3
A3	Saint Vincent	0
A2	Barbados	1
B3	Guatemala	3

Semifinals
A1	United States	3
B2	Canada	0
B1	Cuba	3
B3	Guatemala	0
5th place
A3	Saint Vincent	1
A2	Barbados	3

Final
A1	United States	3
B1	Cuba	1
3rd place
B2	Canada	3
B3	Guatemala	0

=== Quarterfinals ===
Date	Time		Score		Set 1	Set 2	Set 3	Set 4	Set 5	Total	Report
8 Jul	18:00	Canada	3–0	Saint Vincent	25–13	25–14	25–10			75–37	P2 P3
8 Jul	20:00	Barbados	1–3	Guatemala	21–25	25–19	21–25	23–25		90–94	P2 P3

=== Classification - 5th place ===
Date	Time		Score		Set 1	Set 2	Set 3	Set 4	Set 5	Total	Report
9 Jul	16:00	Saint Vincent	1–3	Barbados	17–25	24–26	25–23	18–25		84–99	P2 P3

=== Semifinals ===
Date	Time		Score		Set 1	Set 2	Set 3	Set 4	Set 5	Total	Report
9 Jul	18:00	Cuba	3–0	Guatemala	25–15	25–15	25–17			75–47	P2 P3
9 Jul	20:00	United States	3–0	Canada	25–9	26–24	25–21			76–54	P2 P3

=== 6th place ===
Date	Time		Score		Set 1	Set 2	Set 3	Set 4	Set 5	Total	Report
10 Jul	16:00	Trinidad and Tobago	1–3	Saint Vincent	26–24	19–25	19–25	21–25		85–99	P2 P3

=== 3rd place ===
Date	Time		Score		Set 1	Set 2	Set 3	Set 4	Set 5	Total	Report
10 Jul	18:00	Guatemala	0–3	Canada	13–25	12–25	19–25			44–75	P2 P3

=== Final ===
Date	Time		Score		Set 1	Set 2	Set 3	Set 4	Set 5	Total	Report
10 Jul	20:00	Cuba	1–3	United States	17–25	27–29	25–19	22–25		91–98	P2 P3

== Final standing ==
Qualified to 2017 U-21 World Championship

Rank	Team
1st place, gold medalist(s)	United States
2nd place, silver medalist(s)	Cuba
3rd place, bronze medalist(s)	Canada
4	Guatemala
5	Barbados
6	Saint Vincent
7	Trinidad and Tobago

2016 Men's Junior NORCECA Volleyball champions

United States
3rd title

12-man roster:
K. Ensing, R. Devilbiss, J. Cole, G. Huhmann, S. Stadick,
J. Tuaniga, A. Matauia, M. Wexter, J. Worsley, M. Douglas, E. Jordan, D. Missry
Head Coach:
Jay Hosack

== All-Star Team ==
- Most valuable player
  - Joshua Tuaniga (USA)
- Best setter
  - Joshua Tuaniga (USA)
- Best Opposite
  - Erik Flores (GUA)
- Best Outside Hitters
  - Jordan Ewert (USA)
  - Miguel Gutiérrez (CUB)
- Best Middle Blockers
  - Marcus Thomas (VCT)
  - Roamy Alonso (CUB)
- Best libero
  - Jordan Pereira (CAN)

== See also ==
- 2016 Women's Junior NORCECA Volleyball Championship
