= Gino Brousseau =

Canadian volleyball player (born 1966)

Personal information
- Full name: Gino Brousseau
- Born: September 4, 1966 (age 60); Quebec City, Quebec, Canada
- Hometown: Quebec City, Quebec
- Height: 1.90 m (6 ft 3 in)
- Weight: 85 kg (187 lb)
- Education: Université Laval

Coaching information
- Current team: Canada U21; Laval Rouge et Or
Previous teams coached
Years	Teams
2010– 2016–	Laval Rouge et Or; Canada U21

Volleyball information
- Position: Outside hitter

Career
Years	Teams
1986–1990; 1990–1992; 1992–1994; 1994–1997; 1997–1998; 1998–1999; 2001–2002; 2002–2003	Laval Rouge et Or; Fréjus; Asnières; Suntory Sunbirds; Cannes; Poitiers; Poitiers; Paris Volley

National team
1984-2000	Canada
- Last updated: May 19, 2017

Gino Brousseau (born September 4, 1966) is a former Canadian volleyball player, a member of Canada men's national volleyball team from 1984 to 2000, and a participant in the 1992 Olympic Games. He is the current head coach of Laval Rouge et Or men's volleyball team and the Canada men's junior national volleyball team.

== Personal life ==
Brousseau was born in Quebec City, Quebec. He went to the Université Laval for five years, being names student-athlete of the year in both 1988 and 1990.
