= Joshua Tuaniga =

American volleyball player (born 1997)

Josh Tuaniga

Personal information
- Full name: Joshua Michael Tuaniga
- Born: March 18, 1997 (age 29); Long Beach, California, U.S.
- Height: 6 ft 3 in (1.91 m)
- Weight: 223 lb (101 kg)
- Spike: 130 in (320 cm)
- Education: Long Beach State

Volleyball information
- Position: Setter
- Current club: Berlin Recycling Volleys
- Number: 91

Career
Years	Teams
2016–2019; 2019–2022; 2022–2024; 2024–2025; 2025–2026; 2026–	Long Beach State; Ślepsk Suwałki; AZS Olsztyn; GKS Katowice; Jastrzębski Węgiel; Berlin Recycling Volleys

National team
United States
Medal record
Men's volleyball
Representing United States
FIVB World Cup
Bronze medal – third place	2019 Japan
FIVB Nations League
Silver medal – second place	2022 Bologna

Joshua Michael Tuaniga (born March 18, 1997) is an American professional volleyball player who plays as a setter for Berlin Recycling Volleys and the U.S. national team.

== Personal life ==
Tuaniga is of Samoan descent. His older brother Gustiano "Gus" Tuaniga played college volleyball at Hawaii and younger sister Amelia "Mia" Tuaniga played at USC before playing professionally with the Indy Ignite and Atlanta Vibe. On July 11, 2025, Tuaniga married fellow volleyball player Harlee Kekauoha.

== Honors ==
=== College ===
- Domestic
  - 2018 NCAA National Championship, with Long Beach State
  - 2019 NCAA National Championship, with Long Beach State

=== Youth national team ===
- 2014 NORCECA U19 Championship
- 2016 NORCECA U21 Championship

=== Individual awards ===
- 2016: NORCECA U21 Championship – Most valuable player
- 2016: NORCECA U21 Championship – Best setter
- 2018: AVCA National Player of the Year
- 2018: NCAA National Championship – All-tournament team (Most outstanding player)
- 2019: NCAA National Championship – All-tournament team
