= Ali Ramezani =

Iranian footballer (born 2001)

Personal information
- Date of birth: 14 April 2001 (age 25)
- Place of birth: Rasht، Iran
- Position: Forward

Team information
- Current team: Paykan
- Number: 19

Youth career
- 2020–2021: Saipa
- 2021–2022: Moghavemat Tehran

Senior career*
Years	Team	Apps	(Gls)
2021–	Paykan	28	(0)
- * Club domestic league appearances and goals as of 1 July 2023

Ali Ramezani (born 14 April 2001) is an Iranian professional footballer who plays as a forward for Paykan Tehran in the Persian Gulf Pro League.
