= 2012 Men's Junior NORCECA Volleyball Championship =

2012 Men's Junior NORCECA Championship

Tournament details
- Host country: United States
- Dates: August 27 – September 1
- Teams: 8
- Venue: 1 (in Colorado Springs host cities)

Final positions
- Champions: United States (2nd title)

Tournament awards
- MVP: Benjamin Patch (USA)

The 2012 Men's Junior NORCECA Volleyball Championship was the eighth edition of the bi-annual Volleyball Tournament, played by eight countries from August 27 – September 1, 2012 in Colorado Springs, Colorado, United States. The top three teams will qualify to the 2013 Men's Junior World Championship.

== Teams ==
Pool A	Pool B
Honduras; Mexico; Saint Vincent and the Grenadines; United States	Canada; Curaçao; Guatemala; Puerto Rico

== Pool standing procedure ==
Match won 3–0: 5 points for the winner, 0 point for the loser
Match won 3–1: 4 points for the winner, 1 points for the loser
Match won 3–2: 3 points for the winner, 2 points for the loser
In case of tie, the teams were classified according to the following criteria:
points ratio and sets ratio

== First round ==
All times are MST, Colorado Standard Time (UTC -07)

=== Pool A ===
Pos	Team	Pld	W	L	Pts	SPW	SPL	SPR	SW	SL	SR	Qualification
1	United States	3	3	0	15	225	121	1.860	9	0	MAX	Semifinals
2	Mexico	3	2	1	10	207	160	1.294	6	3	2.000	Quarterfinals
3	Honduras	3	1	2	5	168	199	0.844	3	6	0.500	Quarterfinals
4	Saint Vincent and the Grenadines	3	0	3	0	105	225	0.467	0	9	0.000	

Date	Time		Score		Set 1	Set 2	Set 3	Set 4	Set 5	Total	Report
27 Aug	13:00	Mexico	3–0	Saint Vincent and the Grenadines	25–7	25–10	25–15			75–32	P2P3
27 Aug	17:30	United States	3–0	Honduras	25–12	25–12	25–16			75–40	P2P3
28 Aug	13:00	Mexico	3–0	Honduras	25–15	25–14	25–14			75–43	P2P3
28 Aug	17:30	United States	3–0	Saint Vincent and the Grenadines	25–8	25–8	25–9			75–25	P2P3
29 Aug	13:00	Honduras	3–0	Saint Vincent and the Grenadines	25–17	25–11	25–20			75–48	P2P3
29 Aug	17:30	United States	3–0	Mexico	25–18	25–18	25–20			75–56	P2P3

=== Pool B ===
Pos	Team	Pld	W	L	Pts	SPW	SPL	SPR	SW	SL	SR	Qualification
1	Canada	3	3	0	14	253	161	1.571	9	1	9.000	Semifinals
2	Puerto Rico	3	2	1	11	222	223	0.996	7	3	2.333	Quarterfinals
3	Guatemala	3	1	2	4	206	226	0.912	3	7	0.429	Quarterfinals
4	Curaçao	3	0	3	1	179	250	0.716	1	9	0.111	

Date	Time		Score		Set 1	Set 2	Set 3	Set 4	Set 5	Total	Report
27 Aug	11:00	Puerto Rico	3–0	Curaçao	27–25	25–13	25–23			77–61	P2P3
27 Aug	15:00	Canada	3–0	Guatemala	25–15	25–13	25–21			75–49	P2P3
28 Aug	11:00	Canada	3–0	Curaçao	25–13	25–7	25–22			75–42	P2P3
28 Aug	15:00	Puerto Rico	3–0	Guatemala	25–20	25–19	25–20			75–59	P2P3
29 Aug	11:00	Guatemala	3–1	Curaçao	25–14	23–25	25–19	25–18		98–76	P2P3
29 Aug	15:00	Canada	3–1	Puerto Rico	25–13	25–15	28–30	25–12		103–70	P2P3

== Final round ==
=== Championship bracket ===
Quarterfinals
A2	Mexico	3
B3	Guatemala	0
B2	Puerto Rico	3
A3	Honduras	0

Semifinals
B1	Canada	3
A2	Mexico	1
A1	United States	3
B2	Puerto Rico	0

Finals
B1	Canada	1
A1	United States	3
Third place
A2	Mexico	3
B2	Puerto Rico	0

=== 5th–8th places bracket ===
Classification 5/8
Saint Vincent and the Grenadines	0
Guatemala	3
Curaçao	1
Honduras	3

5th Place Match
Guatemala	3
Honduras	2
7th Place Match
Saint Vincent and the Grenadines	0
Curaçao	3

=== Quarterfinals ===
Date	Time		Score		Set 1	Set 2	Set 3	Set 4	Set 5	Total	Report
30 Aug	15:00	Puerto Rico	3–0	Honduras	25–16	25–16	25–11			75–43	P2P3
30 Aug	17:00	Mexico	3–0	Guatemala	25–23	25–17	25–23			75–63	P2P3

=== 5th to 8th Classification ===
Date	Time		Score		Set 1	Set 2	Set 3	Set 4	Set 5	Total	Report
31 Aug	11:00	Saint Vincent and the Grenadines	0–3	Guatemala	12-25	16-25	16-25			44–0	P2P3
31 Aug	13:00	Curaçao	1–3	Honduras	27-25	19-25	25-27	19-25		90–0	P2P3

=== Semifinals ===
Date	Time		Score		Set 1	Set 2	Set 3	Set 4	Set 5	Total	Report
31 Aug	15:00	Canada	3–1	Mexico	25–17	25–18	24–26	25–21		99–82	P2P3
31 Aug	17:00	United States	3–0	Puerto Rico	25–15	25–16	25–20			75–51	P2P3

=== 7th place match ===
Date	Time		Score		Set 1	Set 2	Set 3	Set 4	Set 5	Total	Report
1 Sep	11:00	Saint Vincent and the Grenadines	0–3	Curaçao	11–25	16–25	19–25			46–75	P2P3

=== 5th place match ===
Date	Time		Score		Set 1	Set 2	Set 3	Set 4	Set 5	Total	Report
1 Sep	13:00	Guatemala	3–2	Honduras	25–18	20–25	25–20	24–26	15–9	109–98	P2P3

=== 3rd place match ===
Date	Time		Score		Set 1	Set 2	Set 3	Set 4	Set 5	Total	Report
1 Sep	15:00	Mexico	3–0	Puerto Rico	25-12	25-21	25-16			75–0	P2P3

=== Final ===
Date	Time		Score		Set 1	Set 2	Set 3	Set 4	Set 5	Total	Report
1 Sep	17:00	Canada	1–3	United States	24-26	17-25	25-23	21-25		87–0	P2P3

== Final standing ==
Rank	Team
1st place, gold medalist(s)	United States
2nd place, silver medalist(s)	Canada
3rd place, bronze medalist(s)	Mexico
4	Puerto Rico
5	Guatemala
6	Honduras
7	Curaçao
8	Saint Vincent and the Grenadines

== Individual awards ==
- Most valuable player
  - Benjamin Patch (USA)
- Best scorer
  - Gerardo González (GUA)
- Best spiker
  - Dany Demyanenko (CAN)
- Best blocker
  - Alexander William Russell (CAN)
- Best server
  - Gregory Petty (USA)
- Best digger
  - José Mendoza (MEX)
- Best setter
  - Micah Christenson (USA)
- Best receiver
  - Luís Bertrán (PUR)
- Best libero
  - José Mendoza (MEX)
