= Barbados men's national volleyball team =

National volleyball team

Barbados
- Association: Barbados Volleyball Association
- Confederation: NORCECA
- Head coach: Andrew Culpepper
- FIVB ranking: 64 ▲4 (1 October 2026)

Uniforms
Home	Away
- volleybarbados.com (in English)

The Barbados men's national volleyball team represents Barbados in international volleyball competitions. The dominant forces in men's volleyball in North and Central America are Cuba and the United States.

== Results ==
7th - 2001 Men's NORCECA Volleyball Championship
8th - 2006 Central American and Caribbean Games
6th - 2007 Men's NORCECA Volleyball Championship

== Squads ==
=== 2001 Men's NORCECA Volleyball Championship Squad ===
- Head Coach: Ludger Niles

#	Name	Date of Birth	Weight	Height	Spike	Block
1	Paul Nicholls	20.04.1981	61	178	318	305
2	Jamal Nedd	19.02.1982	87	195	325	315
3	Fabian Cox	09.01.1980	81	180	335	315
4	Rodney Mayers	10.02.1976	84	178	318	305
6	Renier Grace	26.10.1978	85	195	325	315
9	Andy Jordan	15.03.1966	88	195	335	320
10	Gregory Burke	05.11.1973	87	195	335	320
11	Henderson Dottin	09.11.1980	81	196	335	330
13	Adrian Price	01.03.1982	77	185	325	315
16	Cedric Proverbs	27.10.1971	87	193	330	320
17	Dale Addison	22.02.1976	90	187	325	320

=== 2007 Men's NORCECA Volleyball Championship Squad ===
- Head Coach: Ludger Niles

#	Name	Date of Birth	Weight	Height	Spike	Block
1	Dwight Carter	23.07.1986	86	185	305	300
2	Jamal Nedd	19.02.1982	87	195	325	315
5	Elwyn Oxley (c)	11.02.1987	85	185	320	315
6	Renier Grace	26.10.1978	90	195	325	315
8	Romel Agard	28.11.1985	88	200	330	320
9	Daran Gill	02.01.1985	86	195	325	320
11	Adrian Price	01.03.1982	85	187	320	315
12	Justin Bennett	04.04.1989	86	190	320	315
13	Alain London	14.10.1987	86	190	320	315
14	Shawn Simpson	08.03.1984	88	197	325	320
17	Dale Addison	22.02.1976	90	187	325	320
18	Damien Danzell	12.03.1985	86	190	320	315
