= Men's Junior Pan-American Volleyball Cup =

Men's U21 NORCECA Pan American Cup
- Most recent season or competition: 2026 Men's U21 NORCECA Pan American Cup
- Conference: NORCECA
- Sport: Volleyball
- First season: 2011
- No. of teams: 8
- Most recent champion: United States (3th title)
- Most titles: United States (3 titles)

The Men's Junior Pan-American Volleyball Cup is a bi-annual Continental Cup organized by NORCECA for U21 teams from South-, North- and Central America, and the Caribbean.

This tournament also serves as qualifier to U21 World Championship.

== History ==
Junior Pan-American Cup
Year	Host	Champion	Runner-up	3rd place
2011; Details	Panama City	Venezuela	Canada	Chile
2015; Details	(Canada); Gatineau	Brazil	United States	Canada
2017; Details	(Canada); Fort McMurray	Brazil	Cuba	Canada
2019; Details	(Peru); Lima	Cuba	Canada	Puerto Rico
2022; Details	(Cuba); Havana	United States	Mexico	Canada
2023; Details	(Cuba); Havana	Cuba	United States	Canada
2025; Details	(Canada); Calgary	United States	Canada	Chile
2026; Details	Guatemala City	United States	Canada	Costa Rica

== Medal table ==
Rank	Nation	Gold	Silver	Bronze	Total
1	United States	3	2	0	5
2	Cuba	2	1	0	3
3	Brazil	2	0	0	2
4	Venezuela	1	0	0	1
5	Canada	0	4	4	8
6	Mexico	0	1	0	1
7	Chile	0	0	2	2
8	Costa Rica	0	0	1	1
8	Puerto Rico	0	0	1	1
Totals (9 entries)		8	8	8	24

== Participating nations ==
Nation	(Panama) 2011	(Canada) 2015	(Canada) 2017	(Peru) 2019	(Cuba) 2022	(Cuba) 2023	(Canada) 2025	(Guatemala) 2026	Years
Barbados	–	6th	7th	–	–	–	6th	–	3
Brazil	–	1st	1st	–	–	–	–	–	2
Canada	2nd	3rd	3rd	2nd	3rd	3rd	2nd	2nd	8
Chile	3rd	4th	6th	4th	6th	–	3rd	–	6
Colombia	–	–	–	7th	–	–	–	–	1
Costa Rica	–	–	–	–	–	–	–	3rd	1
Cuba	–	–	2nd	1st	4th	1st	–	–	4
Dominican Republic	6th	–	–	6th	5th	6th	–	6th	5
El Salvador	–	7th	–	–	–	–	–	–	1
Guatemala	–	–	4th	–	–	7th	–	7th	3
Haiti	–	–	–	–	7th	8th	–	–	2
Honduras	8th	–	–	–	–	–	–	–	1
Mexico	5th	5th	–	–	2nd	–	5th	4th	5
Nicaragua	–	–	–	–	8th	5th	–	8th	3
Panama	7th	–	–	–	–	–	–	–	1
Peru	–	–	–	8th	–	–	–	–	1
Puerto Rico	4th	–	5th	3rd	–	4th	4th	–	5
United States	–	2nd	–	5th	1st	2nd	1st	1st	6
Venezuela	1st	–	–	–	–	–	–	5th	2

== Most valuable player by edition ==
- 2011 – Kervin Piñerua (VEN)
- 2015 – Lucas Madaloz (BRA)
- 2017 – Victor Cardoso (BRA)
- 2019 – José Romero (CUB)
- 2022 – Andrew Rowan (USA)
- 2023 – Alejandro Miguel González (CUB)
- 2025 – Sebastiano Sani (USA)
- 2026 – Kyler Wade (USA)

== See also ==
- Men's Pan-American Volleyball Cup
- Men's U23 Pan-American Volleyball Cup
- Boys' Youth Pan-American Volleyball Cup
- Women's Junior Pan-American Volleyball Cup
