= United States men's national under-21 volleyball team =

United States U21
- Association: USA Volleyball
- Confederation: NORCECA

Uniforms
Home	Away	Third

FIVB U21 World Championship
- Appearances: 11 (First in 1977)
- Best result: Bronze : (2025)

U21 NORCECA Continental Championship
- Appearances: 12 (First in 1998)
- Best result: (gold) Gold : 2010, 2012, 2016, 2024
- www.usavolleyball.org
Honours
FIVB U21 World Championship
Bronze medal – third place	2025 China	Team
U21 NORCECA Continental Championship
Gold medal – first place	2010 Canada	Team
Gold medal – first place	2012 Colorado Springs	Team
Gold medal – first place	2016 Canada	Team
Gold medal – first place	2024 Mexico	Team
Silver medal – second place	2004 Canada	Team
Silver medal – second place	2006 Mexico	Team
Bronze medal – third place	1998 Guatemala	Team
Bronze medal – third place	2000 Cuba	Team
Bronze medal – third place	2002 Canada	Team
Bronze medal – third place	2008 El Salvador	Team
Bronze medal – third place	2014 El Salvador	Team
U21 NORCECA Pan American Cup
Gold medal – first place	2022 Cuba	Team
Gold medal – first place	2025 Canada	Team
Gold medal – first place	2026 Guatemala City	Team
Silver medal – second place	2015 Canada	Team
Silver medal – second place	2023 Cuba	Team

The United States men's national under-21 volleyball team represents the United States in international men's volleyball competitions and friendly matches under the age 21 and it is ruled by the USA Volleyball USAV body That is an affiliate of the International Volleyball Federation FIVB and also a part of the North, Central America and Caribbean Volleyball Confederation NORCECA.

== Results ==
=== FIVB U21 World Championship ===
Champions Runners up Third place Fourth place

FIVB U21 World Championship
Year	Round	Position	Pld	W	L	SW	SL	Squad
(Brazil) 1977	—N/a	7th place	—N/a					Squad
(United States) 1981	—N/a	7th place	—N/a					—N/a
(Italy) 1985	Didn't Qualify							
(Bahrain) 1987	Didn't Qualify							
(Greece) 1989	Didn't Qualify							
(Egypt) 1991	Didn't Qualify							
(Argentina) 1993	Didn't Qualify							
(Malaysia) 1995	Didn't Qualify							
(Bahrain) 1997	Didn't Qualify							
(Thailand) 1999	Didn't Qualify							
(Poland) 2001	Didn't Qualify							
(Iran) 2003	Didn't Qualify							
(India) 2005	—N/a	8th place	—N/a					Squad
(Morocco) 2007	First round	7th place	7	4	3	13	14	Squad
(India) 2009	Second round	8th place	8	2	6	10	20	Squad
(Brazil) 2011	Semifinals	Fourth place	8	4	4	10	12	Squad
(Turkey) 2013	Round of 16	11th place	8	4	4	15	14	Squad
(Mexico) 2015	First round	11th place	8	4	4	15	17	Squad
(Czech Republic) 2017	First round	14th place	8	2	6	8	20	Squad
(Bahrain) 2019	Didn't Qualify							
(Italy) (Bulgaria) 2021	Didn't Qualify							
(Bahrain) 2023	First round	13th place	8	2	6	10	19	Squad
(China) 2025	Semifinals	Third place	9	8	1	24	10	Squad
Total	0 Title	11/23	—N/a					

=== U21 NORCECA Continental Championship ===
Champions Runners up Third place Fourth place

U21 NORCECA Continental Championship
Year	Round	Position	Pld	W	L	SW	SL	Squad
(Guatemala) 1998	Semi-Final	Bronze	6	4	2	14	9	Squad
(Cuba) 2000	Semi-Final	Bronze	6	4	2	15	6	Squad
(Canada) 2002	Semi-Final	Bronze	5	2	3	8	11	Squad
(Canada) 2004	Final	Silver	5	3	2	10	7	Squad
(Mexico) 2006	Final	Silver	5	4	1	12	3	Squad
(El Salvador) 2008	Semi-Final	Bronze	6	4	2	12	7	Squad
(Canada) 2010	Final	Gold	5	5	0	15	0	Squad
(United States) 2012	Final	Gold	5	5	0	15	1	Squad
(El Salvador) 2014	Semi-Final	Bronze	6	4	2	14	7	Squad
(Canada) 2016	Final	Gold	4	4	0	12	1	Squad
(Cuba) 2018	Semifinals	Fourth place	5	3	2	11	7	Squad
(Mexico) 2024	Final	Gold	5	5	0	15	1	Squad
Total	4 Titles	12/12	63	47	16	153	60	—N/a

=== U21 NORCECA Pan American Cup ===
Champions Runners up Third place Fourth place

U21 NORCECA Pan American Cup
Year	Round	Position	Pld	W	L	SW	SL	Squad
(Panama) 2011	Didn't participate							
(Canada) 2015	Final	Runners up	6	4	2	13	7	Squad
(Canada) 2017	Didn't participate							
(Peru) 2019	Quarterfinals	5th place	6	3	3	12	13	Squad
(Cuba) 2022	Final	Champions	5	5	0	15	4	Squad
(Cuba) 2023	Final	Runners up	6	4	2	16	8	Squad
(Canada) 2025	Final	Champions	6	6	0	18	2	Squad
(Guatemala) 2026	Final	Champions	5	5	0	15	1	Squad
Total	3 Titles	6/8	34	27	7	89	35	—N/a

== Team ==
=== Current squad ===
The following is the American roster in the 2026 Men's U21 NORCECA Pan American Cup.

Head coach: Donan Cruz

No.	Name	Date of birth	Height	Weight	Spike	Block	School/club
1	Cameron Kosty		1.96 m (6 ft 5 in)				(United States) UC Irvine
3	Drake Foley		1.94 m (6 ft 4 in)				(United States) Corona Del Mar HS
7	Mateo Fuerbringer		1.96 m (6 ft 5 in)				(United States) Mira Costa HS
9	Trevell Jordan		2.08 m (6 ft 10 in)				(United States) Univ. of Hawaii
10	Johnny Dykstra		1.88 m (6 ft 2 in)				(United States) Calif., USC
12	Rafa Urbina		1.96 m (6 ft 5 in)				(United States) UCLA
14	Aleksey Mikhailenko		2.04 m (6 ft 8 in)				(United States) Homestead HS
15	Blake Fahlbusch		2.04 m (6 ft 8 in)				(United States) Loyola HS of Los Angeles
18	Kainoa Wade		2.06 m (6 ft 9 in)				(United States) Univ. of Hawaii
20	Grant Lamoureux		2.08 m (6 ft 10 in)				(United States) Pepperdine University
21	Jackson Cryst		2.08 m (6 ft 10 in)				(United States) Long Beach State
22	Grayson Bradford		2.10 m (6 ft 11 in)				(United States) UCLA
24	Isiah Powell		2.04 m (6 ft 8 in)				(United States) Springbrook HS
28	Tommy Henige		2.06 m (6 ft 9 in)				(United States) Perry HS
