= 2022 Men's Junior Pan-American Volleyball Cup =

Tournament details
- Host country: Cuba
- Dates: 1–8 October 2022
- Teams: 8
- Venue: 1 (in Havana host cities)

Final positions
- Champions: United States (1st title)
- Runners-up: Mexico
- Third place: Canada

Tournament awards
- MVP: (United States) Andrew Rowan

The 2022 Men's Junior Pan-American Volleyball Cup was the fifth edition of the bi-annual NORCECA Men U21 Pan-American Cup. Eight teams participated in this edition held in Havana, Cuba. This tournament served as qualifier to 2023 FIVB Volleyball Men's U21 World Championship.

Players must born on 1 January 2003, and after.

The United States winning the first title of the tournament, after beat Mexico in 3 set. Both teams were qualified to 2023 U21 World Championship.

== Competing nations ==
Group A	Group B
Dominican Republic; United States; Mexico; Chile	Canada; Nicaragua; Cuba; Haiti

== Qualification to 2023 FIVB Men U21 World Championship ==
There are 2 vacancies will be granted to this tournament. One will be granted to the top place team in the final ranking from NORCECA. Another one will be granted to the top team which not qualified to 2023 FIVB Men U21 World Championship regardless of their Confederation (NORCECA or CSV).

== Competition format ==
- Eight teams will be divided into two pools. In the group stage each pool will play round robin.
- The first rank teams of each pool after group stage will receive byes into the semifinals.
- The second and third rank teams in each pool will play in the quarterfinals.

== Competition venue ==
All matches
Havana, Cuba
Ciudad Deportiva
Capacity: 15,000
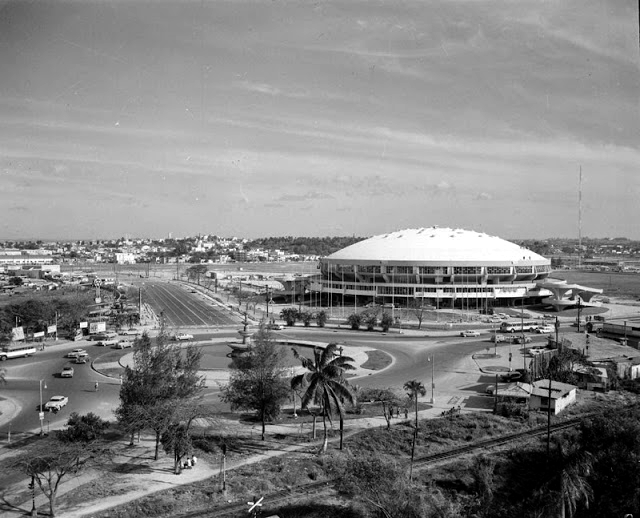

== Pool standing procedure ==
1. Number of matches won
2. Match points
3. Sets ratio
4. Points ratio
5. If the tie continues as per the point ratio between two teams, the priority will be given to the team which won the match between them. When the tie in points ratio is between three or more teams, a new classification of these teams in the terms of points 1, 2, 3 and 4 will be made taking into consideration only the matches in which they were opposed to each other.
- Match won 3-0 = 5 points
- Match won 3-1 = 4 points
- Match won 3-2 = 3 points
- Match lost 0-3 = 0 point
- Match lost 1-3 = 1 points
- Match lost 2-3 = 2 points
- Match forfeited = 0 points (0-25, 0-25, 0-25)

== Preliminary round ==
- All times are in Cuba local Time

=== Group A ===
Pos	Team	Pld	W	L	Pts	SPW	SPL	SPR	SW	SL	SR	Qualification
1	United States	3	3	0	13	261	212	1.231	9	2	4.500	Semifinals
2	Mexico	3	2	1	10	284	286	0.993	8	5	1.600	Quarterfinals
3	Chile	3	1	2	6	231	242	0.955	4	6	0.667	Quarterfinals
4	Dominican Republic	3	0	3	1	225	261	0.862	1	9	0.111	

Date	Time		Score		Set 1	Set 2	Set 3	Set 4	Set 5	Total	Report
3 Oct	10:30	Dominican Republic	1–3	Mexico	25–20	23–25	24–26	20–25		92–96	P2 P3
6 Oct	10:00	United States	3–0	Chile	25–18	25–23	25–17			75–58	P2 P3
4 Oct	10:30	United States	3–2	Mexico	25–13	24–26	25–21	22–25	15–12	111–97	P2 P3
4 Oct	14:30	Dominican Republic	0–3	Chile	17–25	21–25	38–40			76–90	P2 P3
5 Oct	10:30	Chile	1–3	Mexico	13–25	25–15	24–26	21–25		83–91	P2 P3
5 Oct	14:30	United States	3–0	Dominican Republic	25–21	25–15	25–21			75–57	P2 P3

Reschedule due to Hurricane Ian

=== Group B ===
Pos	Team	Pld	W	L	Pts	SPW	SPL	SPR	SW	SL	SR	Qualification
1	Canada	3	3	0	14	247	185	1.335	9	1	9.000	Semifinals
2	Cuba	3	2	1	10	256	213	1.202	7	4	1.750	Quarterfinals
3	Haiti	3	1	2	5	209	247	0.846	4	7	0.571	Quarterfinals
4	Nicaragua	3	0	3	1	177	244	0.725	1	9	0.111	

Date	Time		Score		Set 1	Set 2	Set 3	Set 4	Set 5	Total	Report
3 Oct	12:30	Nicaragua	0–3	Canada	15–25	21–25	11–25			47–75	P2 P3
3 Oct	16:30	Cuba	3–1	Haiti	18–25	25–17	25–12	25–11		93–65	P2 P3
4 Oct	12:30	Canada	3–0	Haiti	25–17	25–19	25–14			75–50	P2 P3
4 Oct	16:30	Nicaragua	0–3	Cuba	16–25	20–25	15–25			51–75	P2 P3
5 Oct	12:30	Nicaragua	1–3	Haiti	25–18	9–25	24–26	21–25		79–94	P2 P3
5 Oct	16:30	Cuba	1–3	Canada	25–22	23–25	23–25	17–25		88–97	P2 P3

== Final round ==
=== Championship bracket ===
Quarterfinals
A2	Mexico	3
B3	Haiti	0
B2	Cuba	3
A3	Chile	0

Semifinals
B1	Canada	2
A2	Mexico	3
A1	United States	3
B2	Cuba	2

Finals
A2	Mexico	0
A1	United States	3
Third place
B1	Canada	3
B2	Cuba	2

==== Quarterfinals ====
Date	Time		Score		Set 1	Set 2	Set 3	Set 4	Set 5	Total	Report
6 Oct	17:00	Mexico	3–0	Haiti	26–24	25–18	25–17			76–59	P2 P3
6 Oct	19:00	Cuba	3–0	Chile	25–18	25–15	25–19			75–52	P2 P3

==== Semifinals ====
Date	Time		Score		Set 1	Set 2	Set 3	Set 4	Set 5	Total	Report
7 Oct	14:30	Canada	2–3	Mexico	23–25	18–25	25–23	25–20	13–15	104–108	P2P3
7 Oct	16:30	United States	3–2	Cuba	25–21	25–14	20–25	24–26	12–25	106–111	P2P3

==== Classification 5/8 ====
Date	Time		Score		Set 1	Set 2	Set 3	Set 4	Set 5	Total	Report
7 Oct	10:30	Dominican Republic	3–0	Haiti	25–23	25–23	25–19			75–65	P2P3
7 Oct	12:30	Nicaragua	1–3	Chile	25–21	13–25	19–25	18–25		75–96	P2P3

===== 7th place match =====
Date	Time		Score		Set 1	Set 2	Set 3	Set 4	Set 5	Total	Report
8 Oct	10:30	Haiti	3–1	Nicaragua	22–25	25–22	25–23	25–18		97–88	P2 P3

===== 5th place match =====
Date	Time		Score		Set 1	Set 2	Set 3	Set 4	Set 5	Total	Report
8 Oct	12:30	Dominican Republic	3–2	Chile	15–25	25–21	19–25	25–22	15–13	99–106	P2 P3

==== 3rd place match ====
Date	Time		Score		Set 1	Set 2	Set 3	Set 4	Set 5	Total	Report
8 Oct	14:30	Canada	3–2	Cuba	13–25	25–19	25–15	22–25	15–12	100–96	P2 P3

==== Final ====
Date	Time		Score		Set 1	Set 2	Set 3	Set 4	Set 5	Total	Report
8 Oct	16:30	Mexico	0–3	United States	19–25	28–30	14–25			61–80	P2 P3

== Final standing ==
Rank	Team
1st place, gold medalist(s)	United States
2nd place, silver medalist(s)	Mexico
3rd place, bronze medalist(s)	Canada
4	Cuba
5	Dominican Republic
6	Chile
7	Haiti
8	Nicaragua

Qualified for FIVB U21 World Championship

2022 Men's Junior Pan-American Cup champions

United States
1st title

Team Roster: Christopher Connelly, Dane Hillis, Kyle Teune, Tyler Morgan, Noah Roberts, Andrew Rowan, Shane Wetzel, Maxwell McCullough, Nyerovwome Omene, Trenton Moser, Zachary Rama, Marc Smith
Head Coach: Andy Read

== Individual awards ==
- Most valuable player
  - Andrew Rowan (USA)
- Best scorer
  - Alejandro Miguel González (CUB)
- Best setter
  - Andrew Rowan (USA)
- Best Opposite
  - Alejandro Miguel González (CUB)
- Best outside hitters
  - Bryan Camin (CUB)
  - Zachary Rama (USA)
- Best middle blockers
  - Martin Collao (CHI)
  - Marc Smith (USA)
- Best libero
  - Axel Altamirano (NIC)
- Best server
  - Andrew Rowan (USA)
- Best receiver
  - Logan Greves (CAN)
- Best digger
  - Axel Altamirano (NIC)
