= 2024 Men's U21 NORCECA Continental Championship =

Tournament details
- Host country: Mexico
- Dates: 9–17 June
- Teams: 8
- Venue: 1 (in 1 host city)

Final positions
- Champions: United States (4th title)
- Runners-up: Canada
- Third place: Cuba

Tournament awards
- MVP: Sterling Foley (USA)

The 2024 Men's U21 NORCECA Continental Championship is the twelfth edition of the bi-annual volleyball tournament, played by eight countries from 9 to 17 June 2024 in Nogales, Mexico.

The United States won their fourth title, after defeating Canada 3–0 in final. Sterling Foley of the United States won the Most Valuable Player award.

== Preliminary round ==
=== Group A ===
Pos	Team	Pld	W	L	Pts	SPW	SPL	SPR	SW	SL	SR	Qualification
1	Canada	3	3	0	14	243	195	1.246	9	1	9.000	Semifinals
2	Cuba	3	2	1	9	264	260	1.015	7	5	1.400	Quarterfinals
3	Puerto Rico	3	1	2	5	195	200	0.975	3	6	0.500	Quarterfinals
4	Guatemala	3	0	3	2	213	260	0.819	2	9	0.222	

Date	Time		Score		Set 1	Set 2	Set 3	Set 4	Set 5	Total	Report
11 June	14:00	Cuba	3–2	Guatemala	22–25	25–20	25–20	22–25	15–13	109–103	P2 P3
11 June	18:00	Canada	3–0	Puerto Rico	25–19	25–23	25–13			75–55	P2 P3
12 June	14:00	Canada	3–0	Guatemala	26–24	25–19	25–17			76–60	P2 P3
12 June	18:00	Cuba	3–0	Puerto Rico	25–23	25–19	25–23			75–65	P2 P3
13 June	14:00	Guatemala	0–3	Puerto Rico	21–25	13–25	16–25			50–75	P2 P3
13 June	18:00	Cuba	1–3	Canada	25–17	18–25	16–25	21–25		80–92	P2 P3

=== Group B ===
Pos	Team	Pld	W	L	Pts	SPW	SPL	SPR	SW	SL	SR	Qualification
1	United States	3	3	0	14	247	165	1.497	9	1	9.000	Semifinals
2	Mexico	3	2	1	11	224	196	1.143	7	3	2.333	Quarterfinals
3	Suriname	3	1	2	4	190	232	0.819	3	7	0.429	Quarterfinals
4	Nicaragua	3	0	3	1	179	247	0.725	1	9	0.111	

Date	Time		Score		Set 1	Set 2	Set 3	Set 4	Set 5	Total	Report
11 June	16:00	Nicaragua	0–3	United States	20–25	17–25	12–25			49–75	P2 P3
11 June	20:00	Mexico	3–0	Suriname	25–21	25–16	25–14			75–51	P2 P3
12 June	16:00	Suriname	0–3	United States	12–25	15–25	15–25			42–75	P2 P3
12 June	20:00	Nicaragua	0–3	Mexico	8–25	19–25	21–25			48–75	P2 P3
13 June	16:00	Suriname	3–1	Nicaragua	22–25	25–21	25–15	25–21		97–82	P2 P3
13 June	20:00	Mexico	1–3	United States	13–25	20–25	25–22	16–25		74–97	P2 P3

== Final round ==
=== Bracket ===
Quarterfinals
Cuba	3
Suriname	0
Mexico	1
Puerto Rico	3

Semifinals
Cuba	0
United States	3
Canada	3
Puerto Rico	1

Final
United States	3
Canada	0
Third place
Cuba	3
Puerto Rico	1

=== Quarterfinals ===
Date	Time		Score		Set 1	Set 2	Set 3	Set 4	Set 5	Total	Report
14 June	18:00	Cuba	3–0	Suriname	25–18	25–22	25–22			75–62	P2 P3
14 June	20:00	Mexico	1–3	Puerto Rico	21–25	25–21	21–25	22–25		89–96	P2 P3

=== Classification 5th–8th ===
Date	Time		Score		Set 1	Set 2	Set 3	Set 4	Set 5	Total	Report
15 June	14:00	Guatemala	1–3	Suriname	19–25	25–22	22–25	23–25		89–97	P2 P3
15 June	16:00	Nicaragua	0–3	Mexico	17–25	16–25	18–25			51–75	P2 P3

=== Semifinals ===
Date	Time		Score		Set 1	Set 2	Set 3	Set 4	Set 5	Total	Report
15 June	18:00	Canada	3–1	Puerto Rico	25–12	23–25	25–14	25–19		98–70	P2 P3
15 June	20:00	United States	3–0	Cuba	25–20	25–21	25–16			75–57	P2 P3

=== Seventh Place game ===
Date	Time		Score		Set 1	Set 2	Set 3	Set 4	Set 5	Total	Report
16 June	12:00	Guatemala	3–0	Nicaragua	25–22	28–26	25–22			78–70	P2 P3

=== Fifth Place game ===
Date	Time		Score		Set 1	Set 2	Set 3	Set 4	Set 5	Total	Report
16 June	14:00	Suriname	0–3	Mexico	14–25	20–25	18–25			52–75	P2 P3

=== Third Place game ===
Date	Time		Score		Set 1	Set 2	Set 3	Set 4	Set 5	Total	Report
16 June	16:00	Puerto Rico	1–3	Cuba	25–13	20–25	18–25	22–25		85–88	P2 P3

=== Final ===
Date	Time		Score		Set 1	Set 2	Set 3	Set 4	Set 5	Total	Report
16 June	18:00	Canada	0–3	United States	18–25	21–25	25–27			64–77	P2 P3

== Final standing ==
Rank	Team
1st place, gold medalist(s)	United States
2nd place, silver medalist(s)	Canada
3rd place, bronze medalist(s)	Cuba
4	Puerto Rico
5	Mexico
6	Suriname
7	Guatemala
8	Nicaragua

== Individual awards ==
- Most valuable player
  - Sterling Foley (USA)
- Best scorer
  - Daniel Martinez (CUB)
- Best setter
  - Kale Fisher (CAN)
- Best Opposite
  - Daniel Martinez (CUB)
- Best spikers
  - Sterling Foley (USA)
  - Piers De Greef (CAN)
- Best middle blockers
  - Jackson Cryst (USA)
  - Piers De Greef (CAN)
- Best libero
  - Osmar Peralta (NCA)
- Best server
  - Daniel Martinez (CUB)
- Best receiver
  - libero Quintin Greenidge (CAN)
- Best digger
  - Osmar Peralta (NCA)
