= 2021 Asian Men's Club Volleyball Championship =

Volleyball club tournament held in Thailand

Tournament details
- Host country: Thailand
- City: Nakhon Ratchasima
- Dates: 8–15 October
- Teams: 10
- Venue: 1 (in 1 host city)

Final positions
- Champions: (Iran) Foolad Sirjan Iranian (1st title)

Tournament awards
- MVP: (Iran) Saber Kazemi

The 2021 Asian Men's Club Volleyball Championship was the eleventh edition of the Asian Men's Club Volleyball Championship, an annual international volleyball club tournament organized by the Asian Volleyball Confederation (AVC) with Thailand Volleyball Association (TVA). The tournament was held in Nakhon Ratchasima, Thailand, from 8 to 15 October 2021. The champions qualified for the 2021 FIVB Volleyball Men's Club World Championship.

The last edition was held in 2019. A tournament was supposed to be held in 2020 in Nakhon Ratchasima, Thailand but was cancelled due to the COVID-19 pandemic.

== Qualification ==
Following the AVC regulations, the maximum of 16 teams in all AVC events will be selected by:

- 1 team for the host country
- 10 teams based on the final standing of the previous edition
- 5 teams from each of 5 zones (with a qualification tournament if needed)

=== Qualified associations ===
Event(s)	Dates	Location	Berths	Qualifier(s)
Host country	—N/a	—N/a	1	(Thailand) Thailand^{A}
2019 Asian Championship	27 April–5 May 2019	(Taiwan) Taipei	5	Iran; ~~Japan~~; Qatar; ~~India~~; Sri Lanka; ~~Chinese Taipei~~; ~~Vietnam~~; ~~Australia~~; ~~Indonesia~~ (Thailand) Thailand^{A} (Kazakhstan) Kazakhstan^{B}
CAZVA representatives	No later than 2 February 2021	(Thailand) Bangkok	1	Uzbekistan
SEAZVA representatives	No later than 2 February 2021	(Thailand) Bangkok	1	Philippines
WAZVA representatives	No later than 2 February 2021	(Thailand) Bangkok	2	Iraq; Kuwait
Total			10	

^A Thailand as host country is entitled to enter two teams if they are less than 16 entrants. Their two berths are credited to have been attained as host nation and tenth placers in the 2019 championships.
^B As Thailand already qualified as host, a berth was given to Kazakhstan through their eleventh place finishing of the 2019 championship.

== Participating teams ==
The following teams participated for the tournament.

Association	Team	Domestic league standing
Thailand	Nakhon Ratchasima QminC	2020–21 Men's Volleyball Thailand League champions
Thailand	Diamond Food	2020–21 Men's Volleyball Thailand League runner-up
Iran	Foolad Sirjan	2020–21 Iranian Volleyball Super League champions
Qatar	Al Arabi	
Sri Lanka	CEB	
Kazakhstan	Burevestnik Almaty	
Uzbekistan	AGMK	
Philippines	Rebisco	N/A (National team)
Iraq	South Gas	
Kuwait	Kazma	

== Draw ==
The draw was held on 3 August 2021 in Bangkok, Thailand.

== Pool standing procedure ==
1. Number of matches won
2. Match points
3. Sets ratio
4. Points ratio
5. If the tie continues as per the point ratio between two teams, the priority will be given to the team which won the last match between them. When the tie in points ratio is between three or more teams, a new classification of these teams in the terms of points 1, 2 and 3 will be made taking into consideration only the matches in which they were opposed to each other.

Match won 3–0 or 3–1: 3 match points for the winner, 0 match points for the loser
Match won 3–2: 2 match points for the winner, 1 match point for the loser

== Venues ==
Matches will be held at the Terminal Hall – Terminal 21 Korat, an indoor arena within the Terminal 21

All rounds
Nakhon Ratchasima, Thailand
Terminal 21 Korat
Capacity: 3,500

== Preliminary round ==
- All times are Indochina Time (UTC+07:00).

=== Pool A ===
Pos	Team	Pld	W	L	Pts	SW	SL	SR	SPW	SPL	SPR	Qualification
1	(Kazakhstan) Burevestnik Almaty	4	3	1	10	11	3	3.667	328	284	1.155	Semifinals
2	(Thailand) Nakhon Ratchasima QminC	4	3	1	8	9	6	1.500	346	334	1.036	Semifinals
3	(Iraq) South Gas	4	3	1	7	10	7	1.429	393	361	1.089	5th–8th semifinals
4	(Kuwait) Kazma	4	1	3	5	7	9	0.778	334	344	0.971	5th–8th semifinals
5	(Sri Lanka) CEB	4	0	4	0	0	12	0.000	222	300	0.740	9th place match

Date	Time		Score		Set 1	Set 2	Set 3	Set 4	Set 5	Total	Report
8 Oct	15:50	Nakhon Ratchasima QminC (Thailand)	3–2	(Kuwait) Kazma	25–22	19–25	18–25	25–21	16–14	103–107	P2
8 Oct	19:30	South Gas (Iraq)	3–2	(Kazakhstan) Burevestnik Almaty	25–16	26–24	23–25	23–25	15–13	112–103	P2
9 Oct	12:50	CEB (Sri Lanka)	0–3	(Kuwait) Kazma	19–25	22–25	17–25			58–75	P2
9 Oct	15:30	South Gas (Iraq)	1–3	(Thailand) Nakhon Ratchasima QminC	28–30	29–27	21–25	20–25		98–107	P2
10 Oct	10:00	CEB (Sri Lanka)	0–3	(Iraq) South Gas	18–25	19–25	21–25			58–75	P2
10 Oct	15:30	Nakhon Ratchasima QminC (Thailand)	0–3	(Kazakhstan) Burevestnik Almaty	18–25	21–25	22–25			61–75	P2
11 Oct	10:00	CEB (Sri Lanka)	0–3	(Kazakhstan) Burevestnik Almaty	20–25	12–25	20–25			52–75	P2
11 Oct	12:30	South Gas (Iraq)	3–2	(Kuwait) Kazma	22–25	25–15	21–25	25–15	15–13	108–93	P2
12 Oct	10:00	Kazma (Kuwait)	0–3	(Kazakhstan) Burevestnik Almaty	17–25	20–25	22–25			59–75	P2
12 Oct	12:30	Nakhon Ratchasima QminC (Thailand)	3–0	(Sri Lanka) CEB	25–21	25–20	25–13			75–54	P2

=== Pool B ===
Pos	Team	Pld	W	L	Pts	SW	SL	SR	SPW	SPL	SPR	Qualification
1	(Iran) Foolad Sirjan	4	4	0	12	12	3	4.000	370	288	1.285	Semifinals
2	(Qatar) Al Arabi	4	3	1	9	10	3	3.333	307	253	1.213	Semifinals
3	(Thailand) Diamond Food	4	2	2	4	7	10	0.700	382	396	0.965	5th–8th semifinals
4	(Uzbekistan) AGMK	4	1	3	4	6	10	0.600	321	368	0.872	5th–8th semifinals
5	(Philippines) Rebisco	4	0	4	1	3	12	0.250	300	375	0.800	9th place match

Date	Time		Score		Set 1	Set 2	Set 3	Set 4	Set 5	Total	Report
8 Oct	10:00	Rebisco (Philippines)	0–3	(Iran) Foolad Sirjan	15–25	22–25	5–25			42–75	P2
8 Oct	12:30	AGMK (Uzbekistan)	2–3	(Thailand) Diamond Food	25–19	18–25	25–23	23–25	13–15	104–107	P2
9 Oct	10:00	Rebisco (Philippines)	1–3	(Uzbekistan) AGMK	26–24	23–25	18–25	19–25		86–99	P2
9 Oct	18:45	Al Arabi (Qatar)	3–0	(Thailand) Diamond Food	25–23	25–17	25–19			75–59	P2
10 Oct	12:30	Foolad Sirjan (Iran)	3–1	(Uzbekistan) AGMK	26–24	25–14	24–26	25–10		100–74	P2
10 Oct	18:30	Al Arabi (Qatar)	3–0	(Philippines) Rebisco	25–19	25–15	25–19			75–53	P2
11 Oct	15:50	Rebisco (Philippines)	2–3	(Thailand) Diamond Food	34–36	26–24	28–26	19–25	12–15	119–126	P2
11 Oct	19:25	Foolad Sirjan (Iran)	3–1	(Qatar) Al Arabi	25–23	22–25	25–16	25–18		97–82	P2
12 Oct	15:30	Foolad Sirjan (Iran)	3–1	(Thailand) Diamond Food	25–19	25–23	23–25	25–23		98–90	P2
12 Oct	18:30	AGMK (Uzbekistan)	0–3	(Qatar) Al Arabi	12–25	20–25	12–25			44–75	P2

== Final round ==
- All times are Indochina Time (UTC+07:00).

=== 9th–10th places ===
==== 9th place match ====
Date	Time		Score		Set 1	Set 2	Set 3	Set 4	Set 5	Total	Report
13 Oct	15:30	CEB (Sri Lanka)	2–3	(Philippines) Rebisco	14–25	25–22	18–25	25–21	11–15	93–108	P2

=== 5th–8th places ===
5th–8th semifinals
14 October
(Iraq) South Gas	3
(Uzbekistan) AGMK	1
14 October
(Thailand) Diamond Food	1
(Kuwait) Kazma	3

5th place match
15 October
(Iraq) South Gas	3
(Kuwait) Kazma	0
7th place match
15 October
(Uzbekistan) AGMK	1
(Thailand) Diamond Food	3

==== 5th–8th semifinals ====
Date	Time		Score		Set 1	Set 2	Set 3	Set 4	Set 5	Total	Report
14 Oct	10:00	South Gas (Iraq)	3–1	(Uzbekistan) AGMK	25–21	25–21	22–25	25–21		97–88	P2
14 Oct	12:45	Diamond Food (Thailand)	1–3	(Kuwait) Kazma	22–25	25–20	23–25	21–25		91–95	P2

==== 7th place match ====
Date	Time		Score		Set 1	Set 2	Set 3	Set 4	Set 5	Total	Report
15 Oct	10:00	AGMK (Uzbekistan)	1–3	(Thailand) Diamond Food	25–22	34–36	21–25	18–25		98–108	P2

==== 5th place match ====
Date	Time		Score		Set 1	Set 2	Set 3	Set 4	Set 5	Total	Report
15 Oct	13:00	South Gas (Iraq)	3–0	(Kuwait) Kazma	25–20	25–22	25–14			75–56	P2

=== Final four ===
Semifinals
14 October
(Kazakhstan) Burevestnik Almaty	2
(Qatar) Al Arabi	3
14 October
(Iran) Foolad Sirjan	3
(Thailand) Nakhon Ratchasima QminC	0

Final
15 October
(Qatar) Al Arabi	1
(Iran) Foolad Sirjan	3
3rd place match
15 October
(Kazakhstan) Burevestnik Almaty	3
(Thailand) Nakhon Ratchasima QminC	0

==== Semifinals ====
Date	Time		Score		Set 1	Set 2	Set 3	Set 4	Set 5	Total	Report
14 Oct	15:45	Burevestnik Almaty (Kazakhstan)	2–3	(Qatar) Al Arabi	25–15	15–25	25–15	26–28	9–15	100–98	P2
14 Oct	18:45	Foolad Sirjan (Iran)	3–0	(Thailand) Nakhon Ratchasima QminC	25–19	25–23	25–22			75–64	P2

==== 3rd place match ====
Date	Time		Score		Set 1	Set 2	Set 3	Set 4	Set 5	Total	Report
15 Oct	15:30	Burevestnik Almaty (Kazakhstan)	3–0	(Thailand) Nakhon Ratchasima QminC	25–23	25–17	25–21			75–61	P2

==== Final ====
Date	Time		Score		Set 1	Set 2	Set 3	Set 4	Set 5	Total	Report
15 Oct	18:30	Al Arabi (Qatar)	1–3	(Iran) Foolad Sirjan	19–25	25–21	23–25	22–25		89–96	P2

== Final standing ==
Rank	Team
1st place, gold medalist(s)	(Iran) Foolad Sirjan
2nd place, silver medalist(s)	(Qatar) Al Arabi
3rd place, bronze medalist(s)	(Kazakhstan) Burevestnik Almaty
4	(Thailand) Nakhon Ratchasima QminC
5	(Iraq) South Gas
6	(Kuwait) Kazma
7	(Thailand) Diamond Food
8	(Uzbekistan) AGMK
9	(Philippines) Rebisco
10	(Sri Lanka) CEB

Qualified for the 2021 Club World Championship

2021 Asian Men's Club Champions

1st title

14–man roster
Sahand Allah Verdian, Mahdi Jelveh, Aleksandar Blagojević, Amir Hossein Derakhshan, Ramin Khani, Rasoul Shahsavari Nejad, Ali Asghar Razmfar, Mohammad Sadeghi Malati, Shahrooz Homayonfarmanesh, Mojtaba Gholizad, Alireza Behboudi (c), Armin Tashakkori, Saber Kazemi, Mostafa Heidari
Head coach
Saeid Rezaei

== Awards ==
- Most valuable player
  (Iran) Saber Kazemi (Foolad Sirjan)
- Best setter
  (Qatar) Georgiev Borislav (Al Arabi)
- Best outside spikers
  (Serbia) Konstantin Čupković (Al Arabi)
  (Kazakhstan) Vitaliy Vorivodin (Burevestnik Almaty)
- Best middle blockers
  (Iran) Mahdi Jelveh (Foolad Sirjan)
  (Kazakhstan) Nodirkhan Kadirkhanov (Burevestnik Almaty)
- Best opposite spiker
  (Brazil) Felipe Bandero (Al Arabi)
- Best libero
  (Thailand) Tanapat Charoensuk (Nakhon Ratchasima QminC)

== See also ==
- 2021 Asian Women's Club Volleyball Championship
- 2021 Asian Men's Volleyball Championship
