= 2024 Asian Men's Club Volleyball Championship =

Volleyball competition held in Iran

Tournament details
- Host country: Iran
- City: Yazd
- Dates: 8–15 September
- Teams: 8 (from 1 confederation)
- Venue: 1 (in 1 host city)

Final positions
- Champions: (Iran) Foolad Sirjan Iranian (2nd title)
- Runners-up: (Iran) Shahdab Yazd
- Third place: (Indonesia) Jakarta Bhayangkara Presisi
- Fourth place: (Kazakhstan) Pavlodar

Tournament awards
- MVP: (Iran) Ali Hajipour
- Best Setter: (Iran) Ali Ramezani
- Best OH: (Iran) Amirhossein Esfandiar
- Best MB: (Iran) Armin Ghelichniazi; (Iran) Masoud Gholami
- Best OPP: (France) Jean Patry
- Best Libero: (Iran) Mehdi Marandi

Tournament statistics
- Matches played: 24
- Attendance: 41,934 (1,747 per match)

The 2024 Asian Men's Club Volleyball Championship was the 24th edition of the Asian Men's Club Volleyball Championship, an annual international men's volleyball club tournament organized by the Asian Volleyball Confederation (AVC) with Iran Volleyball Association (IRIVF).

The tournament was held in Yazd, Iran, from 8 to 15 September 2024. The champions qualified for the 2024 FIVB Volleyball Men's Club World Championship.

== Qualification ==
Following the AVC regulations, the maximum of 12 teams in all AVC events will be selected by:

- 1 team for the Host team
- 3 teams based on the final standing of the previous edition.
- 5 teams from the best-ranked team of each zone from the previous Asian Club Championship. In case no team from a zone participated in the previous championship, the world ranking will be considered.
- 2 teams based on FIVB NF world ranking (excluding host country).
- 1 wildcard from the hosting NF

=== Qualified associations ===
Event(s)		Dates	Location	Berths	Qualifier(s)
Host country		15 July 2024	—N/a	1	(Iran) Iran^{A}
2023 Asian Championship		14–21 May 2023	(Bahrain) Manama	8	(Iran) Iran^{A} Indonesia; Kazakhstan; Qatar; Kuwait; Iraq; Afghanistan; ~~Japan~~
Direct zonal wildcards	East Asia	2 August 2024	(Thailand) Bangkok	3	~~China~~; ~~Chinese Taipei~~; ~~Mongolia~~
Direct zonal wildcards	Oceania	2 August 2024	(Thailand) Bangkok	1	~~Australia~~

^A Iran as host country is entitled to enter two teams if there are less than 16 entrants.

=== Participating teams ===
The following teams participated for the tournament.

Wolfdogs Nagoya withdrew from the tournament due to the security reason.

Association	Team	Domestic league standing
Iran	Foolad Sirjan	2023–24 Iranian Volleyball Super League champions
Iran	Shahdab Yazd	2023–24 Iranian Volleyball Super League runners-up
Afghanistan	Kam Air	
Indonesia	Jakarta Bhayangkara Presisi	2024 Proliga champions
Iraq	South Gas	2023–24 Iraq Premier League champions
Kazakhstan	Pavlodar	2023–24 Kazakhstan Men's National League champions
Kuwait	Kuwait SC	
Qatar	Al Rayyan	2023–24 Qatari Volleyball League champions

== Venues ==
The tournament will be host in Shahediyeh Indoor Stadium, located in Yazd, Iran.

All matches
Yazd
Shahediyeh Indoor Stadium
Capacity: —

== Pool standing procedure ==
1. Total number of victories (matches won, matches lost)
2. In the event of a tie, the following first tiebreaker will apply: The teams will be ranked by the most point gained per match as follows:
  - Match won 3–0 or 3–1: 3 points for the winner, 0 points for the loser
  - Match won 3–2: 2 points for the winner, 1 point for the loser
  - Match forfeited: 3 points for the winner, 0 points (0–25, 0–25, 0–25) for the loser
3. If teams are still tied after examining the number of victories and points gained, then the AVC will examine the results in order to break the tie in the following order:
  - Set quotient: if two or more teams are tied on the number of points gained, they will be ranked by the quotient resulting from the division of the number of all set won by the number of all sets lost.
  - Points quotient: if the tie persists based on the set quotient, the teams will be ranked by the quotient resulting from the division of all points scored by the total of points lost during all sets.
  - If the tie persists based on the point quotient, the tie will be broken based on the team that won the match of the Round Robin Phase between the tied teams. When the tie in point quotient is between three or more teams, these teams ranked taking into consideration only the matches involving the teams in question.

== Preliminary round ==
- All times are Iran Standard Time (UTC+03:30).

=== Pool A ===
Pos	Team	Pld	W	L	Pts	SW	SL	SR	SPW	SPL	SPR	Qualification
1	(Iran) Shahdab Yazd	3	3	0	9	9	2	4.500	270	215	1.256	Quarterfinals
2	(Indonesia) Jakarta Bhayangkara Presisi	3	2	1	6	7	4	1.750	249	239	1.042	Quarterfinals
3	(Kazakhstan) Pavlodar	3	1	2	3	5	7	0.714	265	285	0.930	Quarterfinals
4	Kuwait SC	3	0	3	0	1	9	0.111	206	251	0.821	Quarterfinals

Source: Bulletin No.4

Date	Time		Score		Set 1	Set 2	Set 3	Set 4	Set 5	Total	Report
8 Sep	11:00	Kuwait SC	1–3	(Kazakhstan) Pavlodar	26–28	22–25	25–23	23–25		96–101	Report
8 Sep	17:00	Shahdab Yazd (Iran)	3–1	(Indonesia) Jakarta Bhayangkara Presisi	25–19	25–18	23–25	25–20		98–82	Report
9 Sep	11:00	Kuwait SC	0–3	(Indonesia) Jakarta Bhayangkara Presisi	18–25	20–25	19–25			57–75	Report
9 Sep	17:00	Shahdab Yazd (Iran)	3–1	(Kazakhstan) Pavlodar	22–25	25–18	25–17	25–20		97–80	Report
10 Sep	11:00	Pavlodar (Kazakhstan)	1–3	(Indonesia) Jakarta Bhayangkara Presisi	17–25	20–25	25–17	22–25		84–92	Report
10 Sep	17:00	Shahdab Yazd (Iran)	3–0	Kuwait SC	25–22	25–11	25–20			75–53	Report

=== Pool B ===
Pos	Team	Pld	W	L	Pts	SW	SL	SR	SPW	SPL	SPR	Qualification
1	(Iran) Foolad Sirjan	3	3	0	9	9	0	MAX	225	154	1.461	Quarterfinals
2	(Afghanistan) Kam Air	3	1	2	3	4	6	0.667	193	235	0.821	Quarterfinals
3	(Qatar) Al Rayyan	3	1	2	3	4	7	0.571	244	246	0.992	Quarterfinals
4	(Iraq) South Gas	3	1	2	3	3	7	0.429	212	239	0.887	Quarterfinals

Source: Bulletin No.4

Date	Time		Score		Set 1	Set 2	Set 3	Set 4	Set 5	Total	Report
8 Sep	14:00	South Gas (Iraq)	3–1	(Qatar) Al Rayyan	25–23	25–20	20–25	25–21		95–89	Report
8 Sep	20:00	Foolad Sirjan (Iran)	3–0	Kam Air	25–11	25–11	25–20			75–42	Report
9 Sep	14:00	Al Rayyan (Qatar)	3–1	Kam Air	25–16	23–25	25–16	25–19		98–76	Report
9 Sep	20:00	Foolad Sirjan (Iran)	3–0	(Iraq) South Gas	25–20	25–16	25–19			75–55	Report
10 Sep	14:00	South Gas (Iraq)	0–3	Kam Air	22–25	22–25	18–25			62–75	Report
10 Sep	20:00	Foolad Sirjan (Iran)	3–0	(Qatar) Al Rayyan	25–18	25–16	25–23			75–57	Report

== Final round ==
- All times are Iran Standard Time (UTC+03:30).

Quarterfinals
12 September
(Qatar) Al Rayyan	0
(Indonesia) Jakarta Bhayangkara Presisi	3
12 September
(Iran) Foolad Sirjan	3
Kuwait SC	0
12 September
(Afghanistan) Kam Air	0
(Kazakhstan) Pavlodar	3
12 September
(Iran) Shahdab Yazd	3
(Iraq) South Gas	0

Semifinals
13 September
(Indonesia) Jakarta Bhayangkara Presisi	2
(Iran) Foolad Sirjan	3
13 September
(Kazakhstan) Pavlodar	0
(Iran) Shahdab Yazd	3

Final
15 September
(Iran) Foolad Sirjan	3
(Iran) Shahdab Yazd	0
3rd place match
15 September
(Indonesia) Jakarta Bhayangkara Presisi	3
(Kazakhstan) Pavlodar	0

5th–8th semifinals
13 September
(Qatar) Al Rayyan	3
Kuwait SC	1
13 September
(Afghanistan) Kam Air	0
(Iraq) South Gas	3

5th place match
14 September
(Qatar) Al Rayyan	3
(Iraq) South Gas	1
7th place match
14 September
Kuwait SC	1
(Afghanistan) Kam Air	3

=== Quarterfinals ===
Date	Time		Score		Set 1	Set 2	Set 3	Set 4	Set 5	Total	Report
12 Sep	11:00	Al Rayyan (Qatar)	0–3	(Indonesia) Jakarta Bhayangkara Presisi	18–25	17–25	23–25			58–75	Report
12 Sep	14:00	Kam Air	0–3	(Kazakhstan) Pavlodar	20–25	13–25	22–25			55–75	Report
12 Sep	17:00	Shahdab Yazd (Iran)	3–0	(Iraq) South Gas	25–15	25–21	25–23			75–59	Report
12 Sep	20:00	Foolad Sirjan (Iran)	3–0	Kuwait SC	25–21	25–17	25–17			75–55	Report

=== 5th–8th semifinals ===
Date	Time		Score		Set 1	Set 2	Set 3	Set 4	Set 5	Total	Report
13 Sep	11:00	South Gas (Iraq)	3–0	Kam Air	25–22	25–17	25–15			75–54	Report
13 Sep	14:00	Kuwait SC	1–3	(Qatar) Al Rayyan	25–23	15–25	15–25	19–25		74–98	Report

=== Semifinals ===
Date	Time		Score		Set 1	Set 2	Set 3	Set 4	Set 5	Total	Report
13 Sep	17:00	Shahdab Yazd (Iran)	3–0	(Kazakhstan) Pavlodar	25–21	25–20	25–19			75–60	Report
13 Sep	20:00	Foolad Sirjan (Iran)	3–2	(Indonesia) Jakarta Bhayangkara Presisi	25–22	23–25	22–25	25–21	16–14	111–107	Report

=== 7th place match ===
Date	Time		Score		Set 1	Set 2	Set 3	Set 4	Set 5	Total	Report
14 Sep	14:00	Kam Air	3–1	Kuwait SC	25–19	25–20	23–25	29–27		102–91	Report

=== 5th place match ===
Date	Time		Score		Set 1	Set 2	Set 3	Set 4	Set 5	Total	Report
14 Sep	17:00	South Gas (Iraq)	1–3	(Qatar) Al Rayyan	25–20	25–27	17–25	26–28		93–100	Report

=== 3rd place match ===
Date	Time		Score		Set 1	Set 2	Set 3	Set 4	Set 5	Total	Report
15 Sep	14:00	Jakarta Bhayangkara Presisi (Indonesia)	3–0	(Kazakhstan) Pavlodar	25–15	25–14	25–19			75–48	Report

=== Final ===
Date	Time		Score		Set 1	Set 2	Set 3	Set 4	Set 5	Total	Report
15 Sep	17:00	Shahdab Yazd (Iran)	0–3	(Iran) Foolad Sirjan	20–25	18–25	23–25			61–75	Report

== Final standing ==
Rank	Team
1st place, gold medalist(s)	(Iran) Foolad Sirjan
2nd place, silver medalist(s)	(Iran) Shahdab Yazd
3rd place, bronze medalist(s)	(Indonesia) Jakarta Bhayangkara Presisi
4	(Kazakhstan) Pavlodar
5	(Qatar) Al Rayyan
6	(Iraq) South Gas
7	(Afghanistan) Kam Air
8	Kuwait SC

Qualified for the 2024 Club World Championship

2024 Asian Men's Club champions
(Iran)
Foolad Sirjan
2nd title

14–man roster
Amir Karami, Ashkan Haghdoust, Mohammad Mousavi, Esmaeil Mosafer, Ahmed Reza Shahsavarineghad, Mojtaba Mirzajanpour, Alireza Abdolhamidi, Amirhossein Esfandiar, Ali Ramezani, Amin Khajeh Khalili, Ali Hajipour Moghadam Faroji, Mehdi Marandi, Armin Ghelichniazi, Mohammad Valizadeh
Head coach
Behrouz Ataei

== Awards ==
- Most Valuable Player
  Ali Hajipour (IRI) (Foolad Sirjan)
- Best Setter
  Ali Ramezani (IRI) (Foolad Sirjan)
- Best Outside Spikers
  Amirhossein Esfandiar (IRI) (Foolad Sirjan)
  Mikhail Ustinov (KAZ) (Pavlodar)
- Best Middle Blockers
  Armin Ghelichniazi (IRI) (Foolad Sirjan)
  Masoud Gholami (IRI) (Shahdab Yazd)
- Best Opposite Spiker
  Jean Patry (FRA) (Jakarta Bhayangkara Presisi)
- Best Libero
  Mehdi Marandi (IRI) (Foolad Sirjan)

== See also ==
- 2024 Asian Women's Club Volleyball Championship
