= 2021 FIVB Volleyball Men's Club World Championship =

Volleyball event

2021 Men's Club World Championship

Tournament details
- Host country: Brazil
- City: Betim
- Dates: 7–11 December
- Teams: 6 (from 3 confederations)
- Venue: 1 (in 1 host city)

Final positions
- Champions: (Brazil) Sada Cruzeiro (4th title)

Tournament awards
- MVP: (Cuba) Miguel Ángel López
- Best Setter: (Brazil) Fernando Kreling
- Best OH: (Italy) Alessandro Michieletto (Cuba) Miguel Ángel López
- Best MB: (Brazil) Otávio Pinto (Cuba) Robertlandy Simón
- Best OPP: (Brazil) Wallace de Souza
- Best Libero: (Italy) Fabio Balaso

Tournament statistics
- Matches played: 10
- Attendance: 22,200 (2,220 per match)

The 2021 FIVB Volleyball Men's Club World Championship was the 16th edition of the competition. It was held in Betim, Brazil for the second consecutive time from 7 to 11 December 2021.

Sada Cruzeiro won their 4th title of the world champions, having beaten Cucine Lube Civitanova in the final (3–0).

== Qualification ==
| Team (Confederation) | Qualified as |
|---|---|
| (Brazil) Sada Cruzeiro (CSV) | Hosts and 2020 South American Champions |
| (Poland) ~~ZAKSA Kędzierzyn-Koźle~~ (CEV) | 2021 European Champions |
| (Italy) Itas Trentino (CEV) | 2021 European Runners-up |
| (Argentina) UPCN San Juan (CSV) | 2020 South American Runners-up |
| (Iran) Foolad Sirjan Iranian (AVC) | 2021 Asian Champions |
| (Brazil) Funvic Natal (CSV) | 2021 Brazilian Champions |
| (Italy) Cucine Lube Civitanova (CEV) | Wild Card (2019 World Champions) |

- Cucine Lube Civitanova replaced ZAKSA Kędzierzyn-Koźle which has decided to withdraw from the competition.

== Venue ==
All matches
Betim, Brazil
Ginásio Poliesportivo Divino Braga
Capacity: 6,000
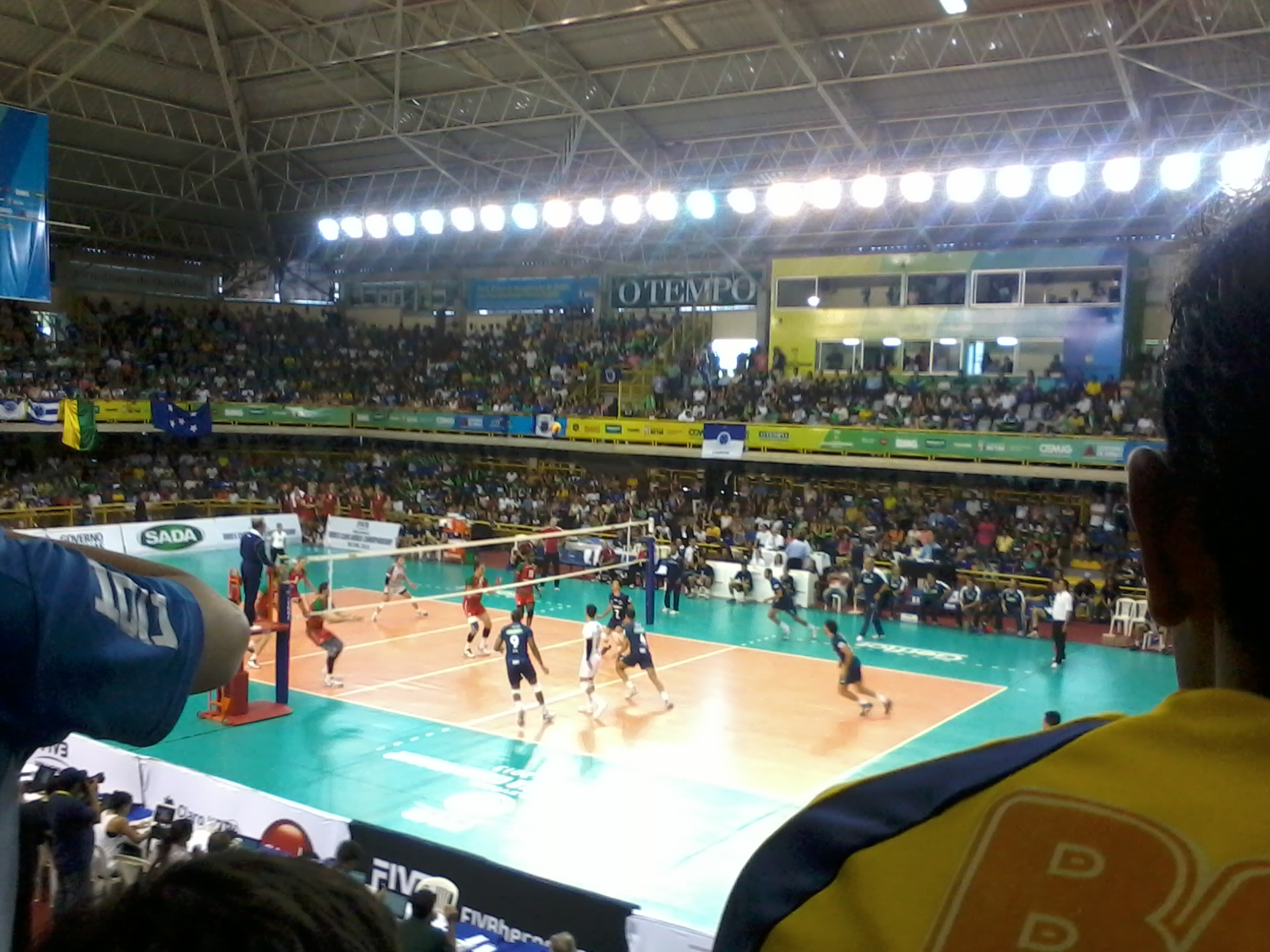

== Pools composition ==
| Pool A | Pool B |
|---|---|
| (Italy) Cucine Lube Civitanova | (Brazil) Sada Cruzeiro |
| (Argentina) UPCN San Juan | (Italy) Itas Trentino |
| (Brazil) Funvic Natal | (Iran) Foolad Sirjan Iranian |

== Pool ranking criteria ==
Ranking system:

1. Number of victories
2. Match points
3. Set ratio
4. Setpoint ratio
5. H2H results

| Result | Winners | Losers |
|---|---|---|
| 3–0 | 3 points | 0 points |
| 3–1 | 3 points | 0 points |
| 3–2 | 2 points | 1 point |

== Preliminary round ==
- All times are Brasília Time (UTC−03:00).

=== Pool A ===
| Pos | Team | Pld | W | L | Pts | SW | SL | SR | SPW | SPL | SPR | Qualification |
|---|---|---|---|---|---|---|---|---|---|---|---|---|
| 1 | (Italy) Cucine Lube Civitanova | 2 | 2 | 0 | 6 | 6 | 0 | MAX | 150 | 111 | 1.351 | Semifinals |
| 2 | (Brazil) Funvic Natal | 2 | 1 | 1 | 2 | 3 | 5 | 0.600 | 166 | 178 | 0.933 | Semifinals |
| 3 | (Argentina) UPCN San Juan | 2 | 0 | 2 | 1 | 2 | 6 | 0.333 | 156 | 183 | 0.852 | |

| Date | Time | | Score | | Set 1 | Set 2 | Set 3 | Set 4 | Set 5 | Total | Report |
|---|---|---|---|---|---|---|---|---|---|---|---|
| 7 Dec | 18:00 | Funvic Natal (Brazil) | 3–2 | (Argentina) UPCN San Juan | 21–25 | 22–25 | 25–20 | 25–21 | 15–12 | 108–103 | Report |
| 8 Dec | 17:00 | Cucine Lube Civitanova (Italy) | 3–0 | (Argentina) UPCN San Juan | 25–19 | 25–13 | 25–21 | | | 75–53 | Report |
| 9 Dec | 17:00 | Cucine Lube Civitanova (Italy) | 3–0 | (Brazil) Funvic Natal | 25–22 | 25–20 | 25–16 | | | 75–58 | Report |

=== Pool B ===
| Pos | Team | Pld | W | L | Pts | SW | SL | SR | SPW | SPL | SPR | Qualification |
|---|---|---|---|---|---|---|---|---|---|---|---|---|
| 1 | (Brazil) Sada Cruzeiro | 2 | 2 | 0 | 6 | 6 | 0 | MAX | 150 | 112 | 1.339 | Semifinals |
| 2 | (Italy) Itas Trentino | 2 | 1 | 1 | 3 | 3 | 3 | 1.000 | 135 | 134 | 1.007 | Semifinals |
| 3 | (Iran) Foolad Sirjan Iranian | 2 | 0 | 2 | 0 | 0 | 6 | 0.000 | 111 | 150 | 0.740 | |

| Date | Time | | Score | | Set 1 | Set 2 | Set 3 | Set 4 | Set 5 | Total | Report |
|---|---|---|---|---|---|---|---|---|---|---|---|
| 7 Dec | 21:30 | Foolad Sirjan Iranian (Iran) | 0–3 | (Brazil) Sada Cruzeiro | 20–25 | 16–25 | 16–25 | | | 52–75 | Report |
| 8 Dec | 20:30 | Foolad Sirjan Iranian (Iran) | 0–3 | (Italy) Itas Trentino | 18–25 | 22–25 | 19–25 | | | 59–75 | Report |
| 9 Dec | 20:30 | Itas Trentino (Italy) | 0–3 | (Brazil) Sada Cruzeiro | 19–25 | 23–25 | 18–25 | | | 60–75 | Report |

== Final round ==
- All times are Brasília Time (UTC−03:00).

Semifinals
10 December
(Italy) Lube | 3
(Italy) Trentino | 2
10 December
(Brazil) Funvic | 1
(Brazil) Sada Cruzeiro | 3

Final
11 December
(Italy) Lube | 0
(Brazil) Sada Cruzeiro | 3
3rd place match
11 December
(Italy) Trentino | 3
(Brazil) Funvic | 0

=== Semifinals ===
| Date | Time | | Score | | Set 1 | Set 2 | Set 3 | Set 4 | Set 5 | Total | Report |
|---|---|---|---|---|---|---|---|---|---|---|---|
| 10 Dec | 17:00 | Cucine Lube Civitanova (Italy) | 3–2 | (Italy) Itas Trentino | 25–20 | 22–25 | 23–25 | 25–20 | 21–19 | 116–109 | Report |
| 10 Dec | 20:30 | Funvic Natal (Brazil) | 1–3 | (Brazil) Sada Cruzeiro | 17–25 | 22–25 | 25–23 | 16–25 | | 80–98 | Report |

=== 3rd place match ===
| Date | Time | | Score | | Set 1 | Set 2 | Set 3 | Set 4 | Set 5 | Total | Report |
|---|---|---|---|---|---|---|---|---|---|---|---|
| 11 Dec | 17:00 | Itas Trentino (Italy) | 3–0 | (Brazil) Funvic Natal | 25–18 | 25–18 | 25–18 | | | 75–54 | Report |

=== Final ===
| Date | Time | | Score | | Set 1 | Set 2 | Set 3 | Set 4 | Set 5 | Total | Report |
|---|---|---|---|---|---|---|---|---|---|---|---|
| 11 Dec | 20:30 | Cucine Lube Civitanova (Italy) | 0–3 | (Brazil) Sada Cruzeiro | 17–25 | 22–25 | 23–25 | | | 62–75 | Report |

== Final standings ==
| Rank | Team |
|---|---|
| 1st place, gold medalist(s) | (Brazil) Sada Cruzeiro |
| 2nd place, silver medalist(s) | (Italy) Cucine Lube Civitanova |
| 3rd place, bronze medalist(s) | (Italy) Itas Trentino |
| 4 | (Brazil) Funvic Natal |
| 5 | (Argentina) UPCN San Juan |
| 6 | (Iran) Foolad Sirjan Iranian |

2021 Club World Champions

14–man roster
Welinton Oppenkoski, Lucas de Deus, Otávio Pinto, Lucas Lóh, Guilherme Rech, Wallace de Souza (c), Cledenilson Souza, Rodrigo Leão, Isac Santos, Fernando Kreling, Lucas Bauer, Rhendrick Resley, Matias Provensi, Miguel Ángel López
Head coach
Filipe Ferraz

== Awards ==
- Most valuable player
  (Cuba) Miguel Ángel López (Sada Cruzeiro)
- Best setter
  (Brazil) Fernando Kreling (Sada Cruzeiro)
- Best outside spikers
  (Italy) Alessandro Michieletto (Itas Trentino)
  (Cuba) Miguel Ángel López (Sada Cruzeiro)
- Best middle blockers
  (Brazil) Otávio Pinto (Sada Cruzeiro)
  (Cuba) Robertlandy Simón (Cucine Lube Civitanova)
- Best opposite spiker
  (Brazil) Wallace de Souza (Sada Cruzeiro)
- Best libero
  (Italy) Fabio Balaso (Cucine Lube Civitanova)
