= 2011 Men's South American Volleyball Championship =

Coordinates: 15°36′19″S 56°07′25″W

2011 Men's South American Championship
Tournament details
- Host country: Brazil
- Dates: 19–25 September
- Teams: 7
- Venues: 2 (in 1 host city)

Final positions
- Champions: Brazil (28th title)

Tournament awards
- MVP: (Brazil) Sérgio Santos

The 2011 Men's South American Volleyball Championship was the 29th edition of the tournament, organised by CSV. It was held in Cuiabá, Brazil from 19 to 25 September 2011. The top two teams qualified for the 2011 World Cup.

== Teams ==
- Brazil (Hosts)
- Argentina
- Chile
- Colombia
- Paraguay
- Uruguay
- Venezuela

== Venues ==
- Ginásio Aecim Tocantins, Cuiabá, Brazil – All matches (excl. Colombia vs. Uruguay on 25 September)
- Ginásio da UFMT, Cuiabá, Brazil – Colombia vs. Uruguay on 25 September

== Round robin ==
- All times are Brasília Time –1 (UTC−04:00).

Pos	Team	Pld	W	L	Pts	SW	SL	SR	SPW	SPL	SPR
1	Brazil	6	6	0	12	18	1	18.000	471	312	1.510
2	Argentina	6	5	1	11	16	3	5.333	469	381	1.231
3	Venezuela	6	3	3	9	11	9	1.222	451	424	1.064
4	Colombia	6	3	3	9	11	13	0.846	522	530	0.985
5	Chile	6	3	3	9	9	11	0.818	429	441	0.973
6	Paraguay	6	1	5	7	4	15	0.267	355	469	0.757
7	Uruguay	6	0	6	6	1	18	0.056	333	473	0.704

Date	Time		Score		Set 1	Set 2	Set 3	Set 4	Set 5	Total	Report
19 Sep	15:30	Argentina	3–0	Chile	25–23	25–21	25–16			75–60	Bulletin
19 Sep	18:00	Brazil	3–0	Uruguay	25–10	25–10	25–14			75–34	Bulletin
19 Sep	20:30	Venezuela	2–3	Colombia	17–25	27–25	25–17	26–28	10–15	105–110	Bulletin
20 Sep	16:30	Argentina	3–0	Colombia	25–18	25–17	25–20			75–55	Bulletin
20 Sep	19:00	Uruguay	0–3	Paraguay	22–25	22–25	24–26			68–76	Bulletin
20 Sep	21:30	Brazil	3–0	Chile	25–21	25–19	25–10			75–50	Bulletin
21 Sep	16:30	Venezuela	3–0	Chile	25–14	25–23	25–18			75–55	Bulletin
21 Sep	19:00	Argentina	3–0	Uruguay	25–14	25–16	25–21			75–51	Bulletin
21 Sep	21:30	Brazil	3–0	Paraguay	25–10	25–14	25–11			75–35	Bulletin
22 Sep	16:30	Chile	3–0	Paraguay	25–23	25–18	25–13			75–54	Bulletin
22 Sep	19:00	Argentina	3–0	Venezuela	30–28	25–20	25–19			80–67	Bulletin
22 Sep	21:40	Brazil	3–0	Colombia	25–18	25–13	25–19			75–50	Bulletin
23 Sep	13:30	Venezuela	3–0	Uruguay	25–14	25–22	25–13			75–49	Bulletin
23 Sep	16:00	Colombia	2–3	Chile	25–22	26–24	26–28	20–25	12–15	109–114	Bulletin
23 Sep	19:20	Argentina	3–0	Paraguay	25–18	25–16	25–20			75–54	Bulletin
24 Sep	11:00	Brazil	3–0	Venezuela	25–14	25–15	27–25			77–54	Bulletin
24 Sep	13:30	Colombia	3–1	Paraguay	25–9	25–23	26–28	25–23		101–83	Bulletin
24 Sep	16:10	Chile	3–0	Uruguay	25–15	25–20	25–18			75–53	Bulletin
25 Sep	08:00	Colombia	3–1	Uruguay	25–17	25–20	22–25	25–16		97–78	Bulletin
25 Sep	08:00	Venezuela	3–0	Paraguay	25–19	25–16	25–18			75–53	Bulletin
25 Sep	11:00	Brazil	3–1	Argentina	25–20	19–25	25–23	25–21		94–89	Bulletin

== Final standing ==
Rank	Team
1st place, gold medalist(s)	Brazil
2nd place, silver medalist(s)	Argentina
3rd place, bronze medalist(s)	Venezuela
4	Colombia
5	Chile
6	Paraguay
7	Uruguay

Qualified for the 2011 World Cup

2011 Men's South American champions

Brazil
28th title

12–man Roster
Bruno, Wallace, Sidão, Murilo (c), Théo, Sérgio, Thiago, Rodrigão, J. Bravo, Lucas, Marlon, Dante
Head coach
Bernardinho

== Awards ==
- Most valuable player
  (Brazil) Sérgio Santos
- Best spiker
  (Brazil) Dante Amaral
- Best blocker
  (Argentina) Sebastian Solé
- Best server
  (Venezuela) Kervin Piñerua
- Best digger
  (Brazil) Sérgio Santos
- Best setter
  (Argentina) Luciano De Cecco
- Best receiver
  (Brazil) Sérgio Santos
- Best libero
  (Brazil) Sérgio Santos
