= 2024 FIVB Volleyball Men's Club World Championship =

International volleyball men's club competition

Tournament details
- Host country: Brazil
- City: Uberlândia
- Dates: 10–15 December
- Teams: 8 (from 4 confederations)
- Venue: 1 (in 1 host city)

Final positions
- Champions: (Brazil) Sada Cruzeiro (5th title)

Tournament awards
- MVP: (Brazil) Wallace de Souza
- Best Setter: (Brazil) Matheus Brasília
- Best OH: (Italy) A. Michieletto; (Iran) Alireza Abdolhamidi
- Best MB: (Brazil) Lucas Saatkamp; (Italy) Marco Pellacani
- Best OPP: (Brazil) Wallace de Souza
- Best Libero: (Brazil) Alexandre Elias

The 2024 FIVB Volleyball Men's Club World Championship was the 19th edition of the competition. It was held in Uberlândia, Brazil. The tournament took place from 10 to 15 December 2024.

Sada Cruzeiro won their fifth title after defeating Trentino Itas in four sets (3–1) in the final. Foolad Sirjan claimed bronze, their first medal and Iran's second podium overall, after they defeated Cucine Lube Civitanova. Wallace de Souza was named the MVP of the tournament.

== Qualification ==
Starting from 2024, the qualification for the Club World Championships will be as follows: two places per continent for Europe, Asia, and South America; one place for Africa; and finally, a club from the host nation will be granted a place. This change aims to ensure the fair representation from different continents and provides an opportunity for the host country to participate in the tournament.

Slots	Qualified as
1	Host club
2	CEV Champions League winners
2	CEV Champions League runners-up
2	CSV Club Championship winners
2	CSV Club Championship runners-up
2	AVC Club Championship winners
2	AVC Club Championship runners-up
1	CAVB Club Championship winners
Total: 8

=== Participating teams ===
Team (Confederation)	Qualified as
(Brazil) Praia Clube (CSV)	Hosts
(Brazil) Sada Cruzeiro (CSV)	2024 South American champions
(Argentina) Ciudad Vóley (CSV)	2024 South American runners-up
(Italy) Trentino Itas (CEV)	2024 European champions
(Poland) ~~Jastrzębski Węgiel~~ (Note: Jastrzębski Węgiel declined the invitation to participate in the Club World Championship citing cost and logistical concerns. They were replaced by Cucine Lube Civitanova.) (CEV)	2024 European runners-up
(Iran) Foolad Sirjan (AVC)	2024 Asian champions
(Iran) Shahdab Yazd (AVC)	2024 Asian runners-up
(Egypt) Al Ahly (CAVB)	2024 African champions
(Italy) Cucine Lube Civitanova (CEV)	Wild card

== Venue ==
All matches
Uberlândia, Brazil
Sabiazinho Arena
Capacity: 8,000
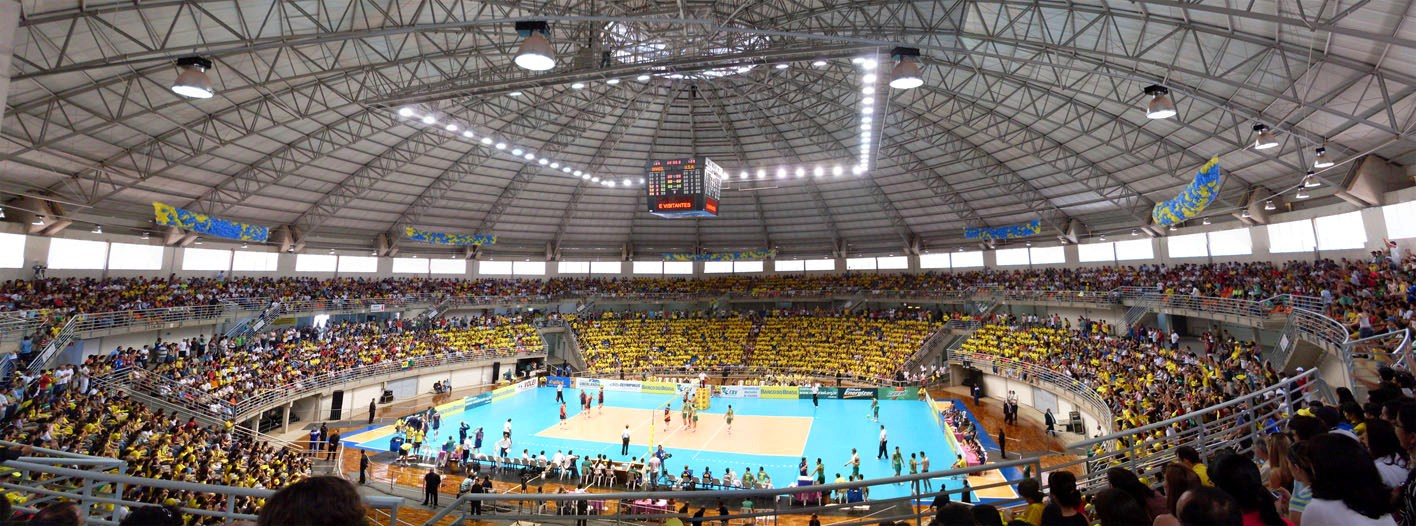

== Format ==
Eight participating teams are divided into two pools of four teams each in a round-robin match. The top two teams of each pool advance to the semifinals (Pool A winner vs. Pool B runner-up and the Pool B winner vs. Pool A runner-up). The winners of the two semifinals advance to the gold medal match and the losers to the bronze medal match.

== Pool standing procedure ==
1. Number of victories
2. Match points
3. Sets ratio
4. Points ratio
5. Result of the last match between the tied teams.

Match won 3–0 or 3–1: 3 match points for the winner and 0 match point for the loser.

Match won 3–2: 2 match points for the winner and 1 match point for the loser.

== Preliminary round ==
- All times are Brasília time (UTC−03:00).

=== Pool A ===
Pos	Team	Pld	W	L	Pts	SW	SL	SR	SPW	SPL	SPR	Qualification
1	(Iran) Foolad Sirjan	3	3	0	8	9	3	3.000	273	239	1.142	Semifinals
2	(Italy) Cucine Lube Civitanova	3	2	1	7	8	4	2.000	286	247	1.158	Semifinals
3	(Egypt) Al Ahly	3	1	2	3	5	7	0.714	260	287	0.906	
4	(Brazil) Praia Clube	3	0	3	0	1	9	0.111	207	253	0.818	

Source: FIVB

Date	Time		Score		Set 1	Set 2	Set 3	Set 4	Set 5	Total	Report
10 Dec	13:30	Foolad Sirjan (Iran)	3–2	(Italy) Cucine Lube Civitanova	25–21	14–25	24–26	25–23	16–14	104–109	P2 Report
10 Dec	17:00	Praia Clube (Brazil)	1–3	(Egypt) Al Ahly	23–25	25–23	21–25	25–27		94–100	P2 Report
11 Dec	10:00	Foolad Sirjan (Iran)	3–1	(Egypt) Al Ahly	19–25	25–15	25–21	25–19		94–80	P2 Report
11 Dec	17:00	Praia Clube (Brazil)	0–3	(Italy) Cucine Lube Civitanova	18–25	19–25	26–28			63–78	P2 Report
12 Dec	17:00	Praia Clube (Brazil)	0–3	(Iran) Foolad Sirjan	16–25	13–25	21–25			50–75	P2 Report
13 Dec	20:30	Cucine Lube Civitanova (Italy)	3–1	(Egypt) Al Ahly	25–21	24–26	25–16	25–17		99–80	P2 Report

=== Pool B ===
Pos	Team	Pld	W	L	Pts	SW	SL	SR	SPW	SPL	SPR	Qualification
1	(Italy) Trentino Itas	3	2	1	7	8	3	2.667	249	218	1.142	Semifinals
2	(Brazil) Sada Cruzeiro	3	2	1	5	7	6	1.167	296	286	1.035	Semifinals
3	(Iran) Shahdab Yazd	3	1	2	3	4	7	0.571	242	259	0.934	
4	(Argentina) Ciudad Vóley	3	1	2	3	4	7	0.571	242	266	0.910	

Source: FIVB

Date	Time		Score		Set 1	Set 2	Set 3	Set 4	Set 5	Total	Report
10 Dec	10:00	Trentino Itas (Italy)	3–0	(Iran) Shahdab Yazd	25–12	25–22	25–21			75–55	P2 Report
10 Dec	20:30	Sada Cruzeiro (Brazil)	3–1	(Argentina) Ciudad Vóley	27–29	25–21	25–17	25–22		102–89	P2 Report
11 Dec	13:30	Trentino Itas (Italy)	3–0	(Argentina) Ciudad Vóley	25–22	25–23	25–16			75–61	P2 Report
11 Dec	20:30	Sada Cruzeiro (Brazil)	1–3	(Iran) Shahdab Yazd	18–25	25–20	24–26	25–27		92–98	P2 Report
12 Dec	20:30	Trentino Itas (Italy)	2–3	(Brazil) Sada Cruzeiro	25–19	21–25	25–18	16–25	12–15	99–102	P2 Report
13 Dec	17:00	Ciudad Vóley (Argentina)	3–1	(Iran) Shahdab Yazd	25–23	25–23	17–25	25–18		92–89	P2 Report

== Final round ==
- All times are Brasília time (UTC−03:00).

Semi-finals
14 December
(Iran) Foolad Sirjan	1
(Brazil) Sada Cruzeiro	3
14 December
(Italy) Trentino Itas	3
(Italy) Cucine Lube Civitanova	0

Final
15 December
(Brazil) Sada Cruzeiro	3
(Italy) Trentino Itas	1
Third place match
15 December
(Iran) Foolad Sirjan	3
(Italy) Cucine Lube Civitanova	2

=== Semi-finals ===
Date	Time		Score		Set 1	Set 2	Set 3	Set 4	Set 5	Total	Report
14 Dec	13:30	Foolad Sirjan (Iran)	1–3	(Brazil) Sada Cruzeiro	23–25	11–25	25–23	24–26		83–99	P2 Report
14 Dec	17:00	Trentino Itas (Italy)	3–0	(Italy) Cucine Lube Civitanova	25–20	28–26	25–19			78–65	P2 Report

=== Third place match ===
Date	Time		Score		Set 1	Set 2	Set 3	Set 4	Set 5	Total	Report
15 Dec	11:00	Foolad Sirjan (Iran)	3–2	(Italy) Cucine Lube Civitanova	23–25	25–23	21–25	26–24	19–17	114–114	P2 Report

=== Final ===
Date	Time		Score		Set 1	Set 2	Set 3	Set 4	Set 5	Total	Report
15 Dec	14:30	Sada Cruzeiro (Brazil)	3–1	(Italy) Trentino Itas	25–22	20–25	25–16	25–22		95–85	P2 Report

== Final standing ==
Rank	Team
1st place, gold medalist(s)	(Brazil) Sada Cruzeiro
2nd place, silver medalist(s)	(Italy) Trentino Itas
3rd place, bronze medalist(s)	(Iran) Foolad Sirjan
4	(Italy) Cucine Lube Civitanova
5	(Egypt) Al Ahly
6	(Iran) Shahdab Yazd
7	(Argentina) Ciudad Vóley
8	(Brazil) Praia Clube

Source: Men's CWC 2024 – Final Standings

2024 Club World champions
(Brazil)
Sada Cruzeiro
Fifth title

Team
Welinton Oppenkoski, Felipe Albuquerque, Otávio Pinto, Matheus Gonçalves, Juan Velasco, Lucas Batista Silva, Wallace de Souza (c), Rodrigo Leão, Rodrigo Ribeiro, Douglas Souza, Gabriel Vaccari, Lucas Saatkamp, Alexandre Elias, Martos Soares
Coach
(Brazil) Filipe Ferraz

== See also ==
- 2024 FIVB Volleyball Women's Club World Championship
