= Julio Alberto Gómez Gálvez =

Cuban volleyball player (born 1999)

Julio Gómez
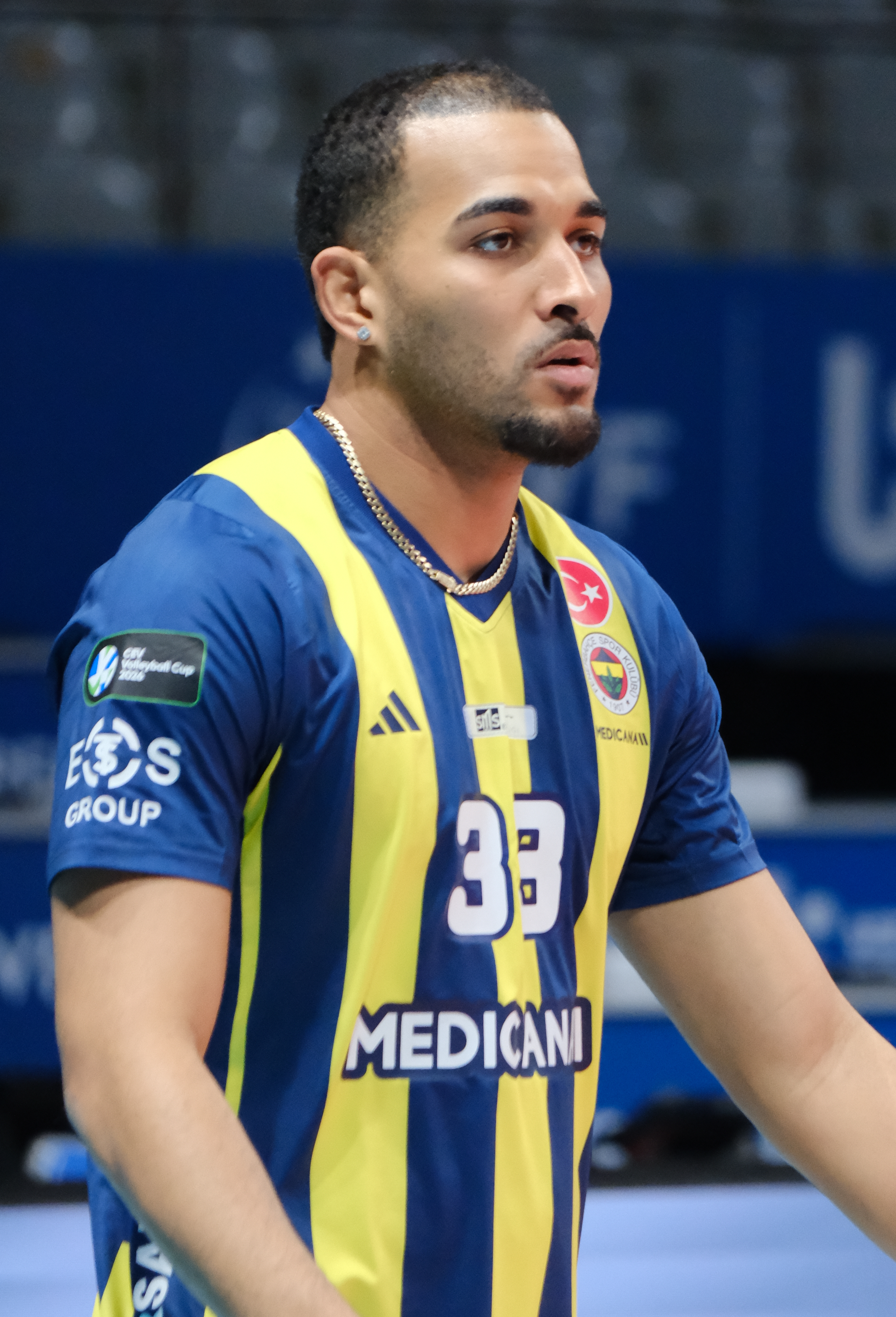

Personal information
- Full name: Julio Alberto Gómez Gálvez
- Nationality: (Cuba) Cuban
- Born: 24 July 1999 (age 27); Havana, Cuba
- Height: 1.94 m (6 ft 4 in)
- Weight: 86 kg (190 lb)
- Spike: 353 cm (139 in)
- Block: 335 cm (132 in)

Volleyball information
- Position: Setter
- Current club: (Turkey) Fenerbahçe
- Number: 33

Career
Years	Teams
2015–2021; 2021–2023; 2023; 2023–2024; 2024–2025; 2024–2025	La Habana; MAFC-BME; VC Limax; SK Zadruga Aich/Dob; Calcit Volley; Fenerbahçe

National team
2019	Cuba
Honours
Men's volleyball
Representing Cuba
Pan American Cup
Gold medal – first place	2019 Peru U21

Julio Alberto Gómez Gálvez (born 24 July 1999) is a Cuban volleyball player. At the professional club level, he plays for Fenerbahçe in Turkey.

== Career ==
He started his professional career with Capitalinos de La Habana in the 2015–2016 season, later played for MAFC-BME, VC Limax, SK Zadruga Aich/Dob and Calcit Volley before joined to Fenerbahçe.

He received the ‘Best Server’ awards in the 2024-25 Slovenia 1A DOL, the ‘Best Setter’ and ‘Best Server’ awards in the 2023-24 Austrian Power Fusion Volley League, also won the ‘Best Server’ award in the 2022-23 Dutch Eredivisie.

== Clubs ==
Club history
Club	Season(s)	Position
(Turkey) Fenerbahçe	2024/25 – present	Setter
(Slovenia) Calcit Volley	2023/24 – 2024/25	Setter
(Austria) SK Zadruga Aich/Dob	2022/23 – 2023/24	Setter
(Netherlands) VC Limax	2023/24 – 2023/24	Setter
(Hungary) MAFC-BME	2020/21 – 2022/23	Setter
(Cuba) La Habana	2015/16 – 2020/21	Setter

== Sporting achievements ==
=== Youth national team ===
- 2019 U21 Pan American Cup

=== Individual awards ===
- 2019: U21 Pan American Cup – Best Setter
