= Rodrigo Leão (volleyball) =

Brazilian volleyball player (born 1996)

Personal information
- Full name: Rodrigo Pimentel Souza Leão
- Nickname: Rodriguinho
- Born: 5 June 1996 (age 30); Rio de Janeiro, Brazil
- Height: 1.98 m (6 ft 6 in)
- Weight: 85 kg (187 lb)
- Spike: 331 cm (130 in)
- Block: 316 cm (124 in)

Volleyball information
- Position: Outside spiker
- Current club: Sada Cruzeiro
- Number: 11

Career
Years	Teams
2013–2014	RJX Rio de Janeiro
2014–	Sada Cruzeiro

National team
2017–	Brazil
Honours
Men's volleyball
Representing Brazil
FIVB World Championship
Bronze medal – third place	2022 Poland/Slovenia	Team
FIVB World Grand Champions Cup
Gold medal – first place	2017 Japan	Team
World League
Silver medal – second place	2017 Curitiba	Team
Pan American Games
Bronze medal – third place	2019 Lima	Team
South American Championship
Gold medal – first place	2017 Santiago/Temuco

Rodrigo Leão (born 5 June 1996) is a Brazilian indoor volleyball player. He is a current member of the Brazil men's national volleyball team.

== Career ==
He participated at the 2017 FIVB Volleyball Men's U23 World Championship, 2017 FIVB Volleyball World League and 2019 FIVB Volleyball Men's Nations League.

== Sporting achievements ==
=== Clubs ===
- 2014–2015 Brazilian Superliga – with Sada Cruzeiro
- 2015–2016 Brazilian Superliga – with Sada Cruzeiro
- 2016–2017 Brazilian Superliga – with Sada Cruzeiro
- 2017–2018 Brazilian Superliga – with Sada Cruzeiro

==== South American Club Championship ====
- 2015 – with Sada Cruzeiro
- 2016 – with Sada Cruzeiro
- 2017 – with Sada Cruzeiro
- 2018 – with Sada Cruzeiro
- 2019 – with Sada Cruzeiro
- 2021 – with Sada Cruzeiro

==== FIVB Club World Championship ====
- 2015 – with Sada Cruzeiro
- 2016 – with Sada Cruzeiro
- 2024 – with Sada Cruzeiro
- 2017 – with Sada Cruzeiro
- 2022 – with Sada Cruzeiro

=== National team ===
- 2017 FIVB World League
- 2017 South American Championship
- 2017 FIVB World Grand Champions Cup
- 2019 Pan American Games
- 2022 FIVB World Championship

=== Individuals ===
- 2015 U21 Pan-American Cup – Best server
- 2016 U23 South American Championship – Best outside spiker
- 2017 South American Club Championship – Best outside spiker
- 2019 South American Club Championship – Best outside spiker
