= Armin Ghelichniazi =

Iranian volleyball player (born 2005)

Personal information
- Full name: Armin Ghelichniazi
- Nationality: Iranian
- Born: 20 January 2005 (age 21); Gomishan, Iran
- Height: 2.01 m (6 ft 7 in)
- Weight: 73 kg (161 lb)
- Spike: 346 cm (136 in)
- Block: 328 cm (129 in)

Volleyball information
- Position: Middle blocker
- Current club: Chadormalu Ardakan
- Number: 20

Career
| Years | Teams |
|---|---|
| 2023–2024; 2024–2025; 2025– | (Iran) Hoorsun Ramsar (Iran) Foolad Sirjan (Iran) Chadormalu Ardakan |

National team
| 2025– | Iran |

Armin Ghelichniazi (Persian: آرمین قلیچ نیازی, born January 20, 2005, in Gomishan) is an Iranian volleyball player who plays as a middle blocker for the Iranian national team and Iranian club Chadormalu Ardakan.
