= Landon Currie =

Canadian volleyball player (born 1999)

Personal information
- Nationality: Canadian
- Born: 16 October 1999 (age 27)
- Hometown: Vernon, British Columbia, Canada
- Height: 1.75 m (5 ft 9 in)
- Weight: 170 lb (77 kg)
- Spike: 310 cm (10 ft 2 in)
- Block: 225 cm (7 ft 5 in)
- Education: Thompson Rivers University; University of Alberta

Volleyball information
- Position: Libero
- Current club: Cisterna Volley
- Number: 1

Career
Years	Teams
2017–2020; 2021–2023; 2023–2024; 2024–2025; 2025–	TRU WolfPack; Alberta Golden Bears; Nice Volley-Ball; VC Maaseik; Cisterna Volley

National team
2019; 2023–	Canada U21; Canada
Honours
Men's volleyball
Representing Canada
NORCECA Championship
Silver medal – second place	2023 Charleston
Pan American Cup
Gold medal – first place	2024 Santo Domingo
- Last updated: 2025-09-20

Landon Currie (born 16 October 1999) is a Canadian volleyball player. He is a member of the Canada men's national volleyball team.

== Career ==
=== Club ===
Currie played university volleyball at both Thompson Rivers University and the University of Alberta.

In 2023, Currie signed for Nice Volley-Ball in the French Ligue A, his first professional volleyball club. In 2024, he signed for Belgian volleyball club VC Maaseik. For the 2025-2026 season, Currie signed with Cisterna Volley playing in the Italian SuperLega.

=== National team ===
In 2019, Currie played for the U21 National Team at the U21 Pan-American Volleyball Cup. For his play during the tournament, Currie was named "Best Digger".

Currie was named to the senior Canadian National Team for the first time in 2023, helping the team win silver at the NORCECA Championship. In 2025, Currie was named to the team for the FIVB World Championship.

== Honours ==
=== University ===
- 2021–22 U Sports Men's Volleyball Championship, with Alberta Golden Bears
