= 2026 Men's U21 NORCECA Pan American Cup =

2026 Men's Junior Pan-American Volleyball Cup

Tournament details
- Host country: Guatemala
- Dates: 23–28 June 2026
- Teams: 8
- Venue: 1 (in Guatemala City host cities)

Final positions
- Champions: United States (3rd title)
- Runners-up: Canada
- Third place: Costa Rica

Tournament awards
- MVP: Kyler Wade (USA)

The 2026 Men's U21 NORCECA Pan American Cup was the eighth edition of the Men's Junior Pan-American Volleyball Cup. Eight teams participated in this edition held at the Gimnasio Teodoro Palacios Flores in Guatemala City, Guatemala.

The United States won their second consecutive and overall third title, after defeated Canada 3–0 in final. Kyler Wade of the United States won the Most Valuable Player award.

== Participation nations ==
Group A	Group B
Dominican Republic; Mexico; United States; Venezuela	Canada; Costa Rica; Guatemala; Nicaragua

== Competition format ==
Eight teams was divided into two pools. In the group stage each pool was played round robin. The first rank teams of each pool after group stage received byes into the semifinals. The second and third rank teams in each pool played in the quarterfinals.

== Competition venue ==
All matches
Guatemala City, Guatemala
Gimnasio Teodoro Palacios Flores
Capacity: 3,835
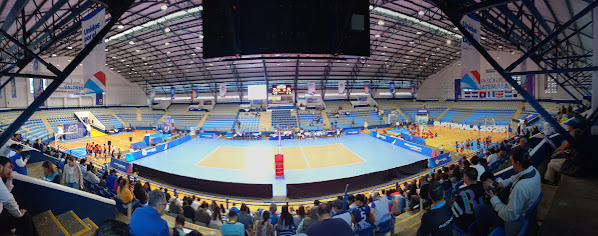

== Pool standing procedure ==
1. Number of matches won
2. Match points
3. Sets ratio
4. Points ratio
5. If the tie continues as per the point ratio between two teams, the priority will be given to the team which won the match between them. When the tie in points ratio is between three or more teams, a new classification of these teams in the terms of points 1, 2, 3 and 4 will be made taking into consideration only the matches in which they were opposed to each other.
- Match won 3–0 = 5 points
- Match won 3–1 = 4 points
- Match won 3–2 = 3 points
- Match lost 0–3 = 0 point
- Match lost 1–3 = 1 points
- Match lost 2–3 = 2 points
- Match forfeited = 0 points (0–25, 0–25, 0–25)

== Preliminary round ==
- All times are in local time (UTC−6)

=== Group A ===
Pos	Team	Pld	W	L	Pts	SPW	SPL	SPR	SW	SL	SR	Qualification
1	United States	3	3	0	14	247	171	1.444	9	1	9.000	Semifinals
2	Mexico	3	2	1	10	207	187	1.107	6	3	2.000	Quarterfinals
3	Venezuela	3	1	2	6	205	228	0.899	4	6	0.667	Quarterfinals
4	Dominican Republic	3	0	3	0	152	225	0.676	0	9	0.000	

Source: NORCECA

Date	Time		Score		Set 1	Set 2	Set 3	Set 4	Set 5	Total	Report
23 Jun	14:00	Mexico	3–0	Venezuela	25–23	25–17	25–19			75–59	P2 P3
23 Jun	16:00	United States	3–0	Dominican Republic	25–13	25–9	25–21			75–43	P2 P3
24 Jun	14:00	United States	3–1	Venezuela	22–25	25–12	25–15	25–19		97–71	P2 P3
24 Jun	16:00	Mexico	3–0	Dominican Republic	25–12	25–23	25–18			75–53	P2 P3
25 Jun	14:00	Venezuela	3–0	Dominican Republic	25–18	25–17	25–21			75–56	P2 P3
25 Jun	16:00	United States	3–0	Mexico	25–23	25–15	25–19			75–57	P2 P3

=== Group B ===
Pos	Team	Pld	W	L	Pts	SPW	SPL	SPR	SW	SL	SR	Qualification
1	Canada	3	3	0	13	260	201	1.294	9	2	4.500	Semifinals
2	Costa Rica	3	2	1	12	251	195	1.287	8	3	2.667	Quarterfinals
3	Guatemala	3	1	2	5	175	209	0.837	3	6	0.500	Quarterfinals
4	Nicaragua	3	0	3	0	144	225	0.640	0	9	0.000	

Source: NORCECA

Date	Time		Score		Set 1	Set 2	Set 3	Set 4	Set 5	Total	Report
23 Jun	18:00	Canada	3–0	Nicaragua	25–12	25–15	25–15			75–42	P2 P3
23 Jun	20:00	Guatemala	0–3	Costa Rica	16–25	12–25	14–25			42–75	P2 P3
24 Jun	18:00	Canada	3–2	Costa Rica	22–25	25–22	25–18	22–25	15–11	109–101	P2 P3
24 Jun	20:00	Guatemala	3–0	Nicaragua	25–19	25–19	25–20			75–58	P2 P3
25 Jun	18:00	Costa Rica	3–0	Nicaragua	25–17	25–12	25–15			75–44	P2 P3
25 Jun	20:00	Canada	3–0	Guatemala	25–21	25–13	26–24			76–58	P2 P3

== Final round ==
=== Championship bracket ===
Quarterfinals
B2	Costa Rica	3
A3	Venezuela	2
A2	Mexico	3
B3	Guatemala	0

Semifinals
A1	United States	3
B2	Costa Rica	0
B1	Canada	3
A2	Mexico	2

Finals
A1	United States	3
B1	Canada	0
Third place
B2	Costa Rica	3
A2	Mexico	1

==== Quarterfinals ====
Date	Time		Score		Set 1	Set 2	Set 3	Set 4	Set 5	Total	Report
26 Jun	17:00	Mexico	3–0	Guatemala	25–23	25–13	25–22			75–58	P2 P3
26 Jun	19:00	Costa Rica	3–2	Venezuela	25–17	25–27	18–25	25–20	15–10	108–99	P2 P3

==== Classification 5–8 ====
Date	Time		Score		Set 1	Set 2	Set 3	Set 4	Set 5	Total	Report
27 Jun	14:00	Dominican Republic	3–0	Guatemala	25–23	27–25	25–23			77–71	P2 P3
27 Jun	16:00	Nicaragua	1–3	Venezuela	25–23	23–25	19–25	16–25		83–98	P2 P3

==== Semifinals ====
Date	Time		Score		Set 1	Set 2	Set 3	Set 4	Set 5	Total	Report
27 Jun	18:00	United States	3–0	Costa Rica	25–14	27–25	25–18			77–57	P2 P3
27 Jun	20:00	Canada	3–2	Mexico	22–25	25–23	25–22	30–32	15–10	117–112	P2 P3

===== 7th place match =====
Date	Time		Score		Set 1	Set 2	Set 3	Set 4	Set 5	Total	Report
28 Jun	10:00	Guatemala	3–0	Nicaragua	25–17	25–13	25–16			75–46	P2 P3

===== 5th place match =====
Date	Time		Score		Set 1	Set 2	Set 3	Set 4	Set 5	Total	Report
28 Jun	12:00	Dominican Republic	1–3	Venezuela	21–25	29–27	22–25	24–26		96–103	P2 P3

==== 3rd place match ====
Date	Time		Score		Set 1	Set 2	Set 3	Set 4	Set 5	Total	Report
28 Jun	14:00	Costa Rica	3–1	Mexico	25–23	16–25	25–21	25–19		91–88	P2 P3

==== Final ====
Date	Time		Score		Set 1	Set 2	Set 3	Set 4	Set 5	Total	Report
28 Jun	16:00	United States	3–0	Canada	25–15	25–19	25–14			75–48	P2 P3

== Final standing ==
Rank	Team
1st place, gold medalist(s)	United States
2nd place, silver medalist(s)	Canada
3rd place, bronze medalist(s)	Costa Rica
4	Mexico
5	Venezuela
6	Dominican Republic
7	Guatemala
8	Nicaragua

== Individual awards ==
- Most valuable player
  - Kyler Wade (USA)
- Best scorer
  - Stanley Grant (CRC)
- Best setter
  - Matthew Brown (CAN)
- Best opposite
  - Yoisbel Galeno (VEN)
- Best spikers
  - Mateo Fuerbringer (USA)
  - Tyson Dezutter (CAN)
- Best middle blockers
  - Matthew Siebenga (CAN)
  - Jeremy Vanega (CRC)
- Best libero
  - Emanuel Ramírez (DOM)
- Best server
  - Kyler Wade (USA)
- Best receiver
  - Jonathan Dykstra (USA)
- Best digger
  - Emanuel Ramírez (DOM)
