= Saber Kazemi =

Iranian volleyball player (1998–2025)

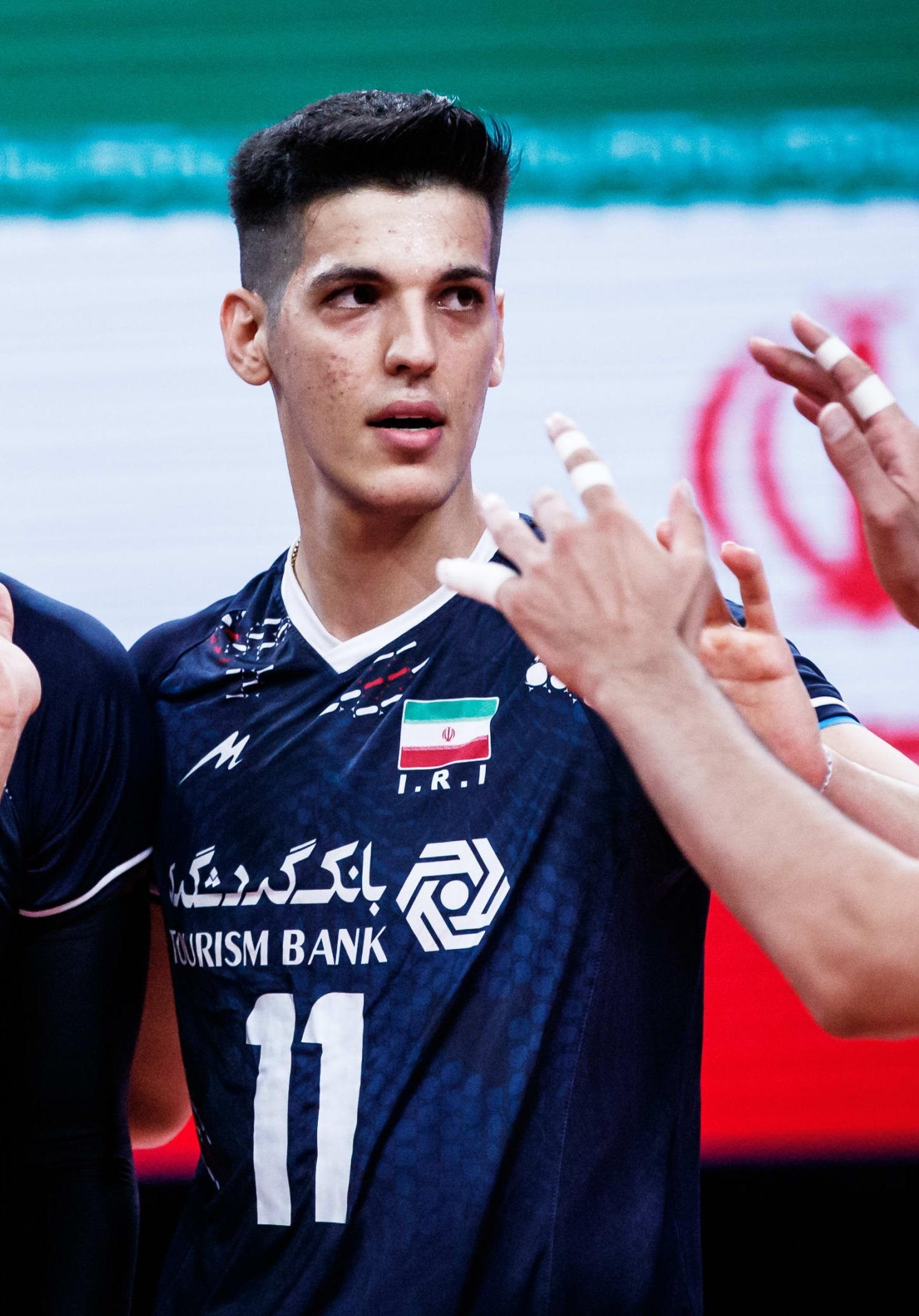
- Kazemi in 2021

Personal information
- Born: 24 December 1998; Qanqormeh, Iran
- Died: 5 November 2025 (aged 26); Tehran, Iran
- Height: 2.05 m (6 ft 9 in)
- Weight: 94 kg (207 lb)
- Spike: 3.60 m (142 in)
- Block: 3.47 m (137 in)

Volleyball information
- Position: Opposite spiker

Career
Years	Teams
2017; 2018; 2019; 2020; 2021; 2022; 2023; 2024; 2025	(Iran) Shams Tehran (Turkey) Ziraat Bankası Ankara (Iran) Khatam Ardakan (Iran) Shahrdari Urmia (Iran) Foolad Sirjan (Qatar) Al Arabi; Kuwait SC (Indonesia) Jakarta Bhayangkara Presisi (Qatar) Al Rayyan

National team
2018–2024	Iran U-19; Iran U-23; Iran
Honours
Representing Iran
Men's volleyball
Asian Championship
Gold medal – first place	2021 Chiba-Funabashi	Team
Silver medal – second place	2023 Urmia	Team
Asian Games
Gold medal – first place	2018 Jakarta–Palembang	Team
Gold medal – first place	2022 Hangzhou	Team

Saber Kazemi (Arabic: صابر کاظمی; 24 December 1998 – 5 November 2025) was an Iranian Turkmen volleyball player, who played as an opposite spiker for the Iranian national team and Qatari club Al Rayyan.

Kazemi was invited to the Iran senior national team by Igor Kolaković in 2018 and made his debut match against Italy in the 2018 Nations League.

In October 2025, Kazemi was initially reported to have died following an accident; however, this was later updated to state he had been declared brain-dead and was on life support. Kazemi later died in hospital in Tehran, on 5 November 2025, at the age of 26.

== Honours ==
=== National team ===
- Asian Championship
  - Gold medal (1): 2021
  - Silver medal (1): 2023
- Asian Games
  - Gold medal (2): 2018, 2022

=== Club ===
- Asian Championship
  - Gold medal (1): 2021 (Foolad Sirjan Iranian)
- Iranian Super League
  - Champions (1): 2021 (Foolad Sirjan Iranian)

=== Individual ===
- Most Valuable Player: 2021 Asian Championship
- Most Valuable Player: 2021 Asian Club Championship

Awards
Preceded by (Australia) Thomas Edgar	Most Valuable Player of Asian Men's Championship; 2021	Succeeded by (Japan) Yūki Ishikawa
Preceded by (Iran) Alireza Jalali	Most Valuable Player of Asian Men's Club Championship; 2021	Succeeded by (Iran) Saeid Marouf
