= Qatari Women's Volleyball League =

- Current season, competition or edition: 2025–26 Qatari League
- Sport: Volleyball
- First season: 2023; 3 years ago
- Administrator: QVF
- No. of teams: 6 teams
- Country: Qatar
- Confederation: AVC
- Continent: Asia
- Most recent champion: Al-Arabi SC (1st title) (2025–26)
- Most titles: Three teams (1 titles)
- Level on pyramid: Level 1
- Relegation to: National 2
- Domestic cups: Qatar Emir Cup; Qatar Crown Cup
- International cups: AVC Champions League; Arab Clubs Championship

The Qatar Women's Volleyball League ( Arabic : الدوري القطري لكرة الطائرة للسيدات ) is an annual women's volleyball competition in Qatar, organized by the Qatar Volleyball Association in cooperation with the Qatar Women's Volleyball League Organization. The championship has been held since 2023.

== Competition format ==
The inaugural Qatar Women's Volleyball Championship, which was held with open participation, took place from October 2023 to January 2024. Ten teams competed, including nine from Qatar and one from Sri Lanka: F45 Doha , Waed Academy (Doha), Al-Arabi SC (Doha), Belgravia Academy (Doha), Qatar SC (Doha), Sri Lanka Lions (Colombo, Sri Lanka), Hamad Bin Khalifa University (Doha), Doha University (Doha), Qatar Foundation (Doha), and Qatar University (Doha). The teams played a single Round-robin tournament, with the final standings determined by the overall results. Matches were played in a best-of-three format. F45 Doha won the inaugural championship, while Waed Academy finished as runners-up and Al-Arabi SC placed third. The second championship was held from January to May 2025 and featured six teams : Al-Rayyan SC, Al-Arabi SC (Doha), Qatar SC (Doha), Al Ahli SC (Doha), Al Khor, and Qatar Foundation (Doha). The competition was contested as a double round-robin tournament. Al-Rayyan SC claimed its first championship title, Al-Arabi SC finished second, and Qatar SC placed third.

== Titles by Clubs ==
Titles by club
Club	Titles won	Runners-up
Al-Rayyan SC	1	1
Al-Arabi SC	1	1
F45 Doha	1	0
Waed Academy	0	1

== Winners list ==
Medalists by season
Season	Champions	Runners-up	Third place
2023–24	F45 Doha	Waed Academy (Doha)	Al-Arabi SC (Doha)
2025	Al-Rayyan SC	Al-Arabi SC (Doha)	Qatar SC (Doha)
2026	Al-Arabi SC (Doha)	Al-Rayyan SC	Qatar SC (Doha)

Sources :
