= 2015 Men's Junior Pan-American Volleyball Cup =

Tournament details
- Host country: Canada
- Dates: June 23 – 28, 2015
- Teams: 7
- Venue: 1 (in Gatineau host cities)

Final positions
- Champions: Brazil (1st title)
- Runners-up: United States
- Third place: Canada

Tournament awards
- MVP: Lucas Madaloz (BRA)

The 2015 Men's Junior Pan-American Volleyball Cup was the second edition of the bi-annual men's volleyball tournament, played by seven countries from June 23 – 28, 2015 in Gatineau, Canada.

== Competing nations ==
Group A	Group B
Canada; Chile; Mexico	Barbados; Brazil; El Salvador; United States

== Competition format ==
The competition format for the 2015 Junior Pan American Volleyball Cup divides the 7 participating teams in 2 groups (one of 3 and one of 4 teams).

The best team from Group A and Group B will advance to the semifinals, the second and third teams from Group B will play the quarterfinals against the second and third teams from Pool A.

=== Pool standing procedure ===
Match won 3–0: 5 points for the winner, 0 point for the loser
Match won 3–1: 4 points for the winner, 1 points for the loser
Match won 3–2: 3 points for the winner, 2 points for the loser
In case of tie, the teams were classified according to the following criteria:
points ratio and sets ratio

== Preliminary round ==
- All times are in Eastern Standard Time (UTC−05:00)

=== Group A ===
Pos	Team	Pld	W	L	Pts	SPW	SPL	SPR	SW	SL	SR	Qualification
1	Canada	2	2	0	8	181	164	1.104	6	2	3.000	Semifinals
2	Chile	2	1	1	7	179	165	1.085	5	3	1.667	Quarterfinals
3	Mexico	2	0	2	0	119	150	0.793	0	6	0.000	Quarterfinals

Date	Time		Score		Set 1	Set 2	Set 3	Set 4	Set 5	Total	Report
23 Jun	20:00	Mexico	0–3	Canada	23–25	23–25	14–25			60–75	P2 P3
24 Jun	18:00	Chile	3–0	Mexico	25–22	25–18	25–19			75–59	P2 P3
25 Jun	20:00	Canada	3–2	Chile	25–21	25–22	21–25	20–25	15–11	106–104	P2 P3

=== Group B ===
Pos	Team	Pld	W	L	Pts	SPW	SPL	SPR	SW	SL	SR	Qualification
1	Brazil	3	3	0	14	238	155	1.535	9	1	9.000	Semifinals
2	United States	3	2	1	11	236	185	1.276	7	3	2.333	Quarterfinals
3	Barbados	3	1	2	3	187	250	0.748	3	8	0.375	Quarterfinals
4	El Salvador	3	0	3	2	187	258	0.725	2	9	0.222	

Date	Time		Score		Set 1	Set 2	Set 3	Set 4	Set 5	Total	Report
23 Jun	16:00	El Salvador	0–3	Brazil	11–25	11–25	14–25			36–75	P2 P3
23 Jun	18:00	Barbados	0–3	United States	17–25	11–25	18–25			46–75	P2 P3
24 Jun	16:00	El Salvador	2–3	Barbados	25–19	26–24	17–25	21–25	11–15	100–108	P2 P3
24 Jun	20:00	Brazil	3–1	United States	25–23	25–18	13–25	25–20		88–86	P2 P3
25 Jun	16:00	Brazil	3–0	Barbados	25–13	25–12	25–8			75–33	P2 P3
25 Jun	18:00	United States	3–0	El Salvador	25–15	25–14	25–22			75–51	P2 P3

== Final round ==
=== Championship bracket ===
Quarterfinals
A2	Chile	3
B3	Barbados	0
B2	United States	3
A3	Mexico	0

Semifinals
B1	Brazil	3
A2	Chile	1
A1	Canada	1
B2	United States	3

Finals
B1	Brazil	3
B2	United States	0
Third place
A2	Chile	2
A1	Canada	3

=== Quarterfinals ===
Date	Time		Score		Set 1	Set 2	Set 3	Set 4	Set 5	Total	Report
26 Jun	18:00	Chile	3–0	Barbados	25–17	25–10	25–20			75–47	P2 P3
26 Jun	20:00	United States	3–0	Mexico	25–19	25–18	25–12			75–49	P2 P3

=== Classification 5 ===
Date	Time		Score		Set 1	Set 2	Set 3	Set 4	Set 5	Total	Report
27 Jun	16:00	Barbados	0–3	Mexico	22–25	21–25	19–25			62–75	P2 P3

=== Semifinals ===
Date	Time		Score		Set 1	Set 2	Set 3	Set 4	Set 5	Total	Report
27 Jun	18:00	Brazil	3–1	Chile	25–17	25–15	22–25	25–19		97–76	P2 P3
27 Jun	20:00	Canada	1–3	United States	19–25	22–25	25–20	22–25		88–95	P2 P3

=== Sixth place match ===
Date	Time		Score		Set 1	Set 2	Set 3	Set 4	Set 5	Total	Report
28 Jun	16:00	El Salvador	1–3	Barbados	11–25	15–25	25–21	18–25		69–96	P2 P3

=== Bronze medal match ===
Date	Time		Score		Set 1	Set 2	Set 3	Set 4	Set 5	Total	Report
28 Jun	18:00	Chile	2–3	Canada	23–25	25–19	25–20	16–25	11–25	100–114	P2 P3

=== Final ===
Date	Time		Score		Set 1	Set 2	Set 3	Set 4	Set 5	Total	Report
28 Jun	20:00	Brazil	3–0	United States	25–22	25–23	25–17			75–62	P2 P3

== Final standing ==
Rank	Team
1st place, gold medalist(s)	Brazil
2nd place, silver medalist(s)	United States
3rd place, bronze medalist(s)	Canada
4	Chile
5	Mexico
6	Barbados
7	El Salvador

2015 Men's Junior Pan-American Cup champions

Brazil
1st title

== Individual awards ==
- Most valuable player
  - Lucas Madaloz (BRA)
- Best scorer
  - Jabarry Gooddridge (BAR)
- Best setter
  - Pedro Silva (BRA)
- Best Opposite
  - Andriy Stapleton (BAR)
- Best Outside Hitters
  - Brandon Koppers (CAN)
  - Ryan Nickifor (CAN)
- Best Middle Blockers
  - Gabriel Arraya (CHI)
  - Ammuniki Wood (BAR)
- Best server
  - Rodrigo Leão (BRA)
- Best digger
  - Andrew Richards (CAN)
- Best receiver
  - Rogério Carvalho (BRA)
- Best libero
  - Rogério Carvalho (BRA)
