= Foolad Sirjan VC =

Iranian volleyball team

- Full name: Foolad Sirjan Iranian Volleyball Club
- Founded: 2017
- Ground: Gol Gohar Sports Complex, Sirjan, Kerman Province, Iran
- Chairman: (Iran) Mohammadreza Amani Lari
- Head coach: (Iran) Behrouz Ataei
- League: Iranian Super League
- 2024–25: Champions

Foolad Sirjan, officially Foolad Sirjan Iranian Volleyball Club is an Iranian professional volleyball team based in Sirjan, Kerman Province. The club competes in the Iranian Volleyball Super League (ISVL). The team plays its home games at the Gol Gohar Sports Complex in Sirjan.

Founded in 2017, the club quickly rose to prominence in the Iranian volleyball scene. The team is known for its strong performances in domestic competitions, securing its place as one of the top teams in the country. The club's management is headed by Mohammadreza Amani Lari, who has played a key role in the club's development and success.

Under the leadership of head coach Behrouz Ataei, Foolad Sirjan has seen notable success. The club is a three-time Iranian volleyball champion, having won the 2020–21, 2023–24, and 2024–25 seasons of the Iranian Volleyball Super League. The team is also a two-time champion in the AVC Men's Champions League (formerly the Asian Men's Club Volleyball Championship), having won the tournament in 2021 and 2024.

In the 2024 FIVB Club World Championship, Foolad Sirjan finished first in their group, ultimately securing third place in the tournament, marking a significant achievement on the international stage.

== Honours ==
- FIVB Club World Championship

(bronze) Third place (1): 2024

- AVC Champions League

(gold) Champions (2): 2021, 2024

- Iranian League

Champions (3): 2020–21, 2023–24, 2024–25,2025–26
