= Kervin Piñerua =

Venezuelan volleyball player (1991–2016)

Kervin Piñerúa
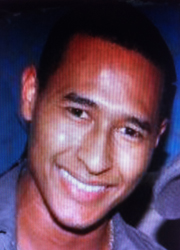
- Piñerúa in 2012

Personal information
- Full name: Kervin Martin Piñerúa Urbina
- Born: February 22, 1991; Caracas, Venezuela
- Died: November 18, 2016 (aged 25); Ankara, Turkey
- Hometown: Costas, Medina, Venezuela
- Height: 1.91 m (6 ft 3 in)
- Weight: 85 kg (187 lb)
- Spike: 346 cm (136 in)
- Block: 342 cm (135 in)

Volleyball information
- Position: Opposite

Career
Years	Teams
2010–2011; 2011–2012; 2012–2013; 2013–2015; 2015; 2015; 2016	SOS Villa María; Galatasaray; Matera Bulls; VK Prievidza; Zahra Club; Vikingos de Miranda; Afyonkarahisar Belediyespor

National team
2010–2016	Venezuela
Honours
Men's volleyball
Representing Venezuela
South American Championship
Bronze medal – third place	2011 Cuiabá
- Last updated: 18 November 2016

Kervin Martin Piñerúa Urbina (22 February 1991 – 18 November 2016) was a Venezuelan volleyball player who played as an opposite hitter for Miranda and as captain for Venezuela's national team. On November 18, 2016 he died at a hospital in Ankara after a heart attack.

== Personal life ==
Piñerúa started playing baseball and competing in athletics at an early age. He was convinced by his mother to play volleyball and entered Venezuela's national team at the age of 18.

== Career ==
=== 2011 ===
Piñerúa represented his country at the First Junior Pan-American Cup in Panama City where he helped his team win the Gold Medal and was named MVP of the competition. He represented his country again in the Pan American Games finishing 8th and the 2011 South American Championship winning the Bronze Medal and the award for "Best Server".

== Awards ==
=== Individuals ===
- 2010 Junior South American Championship "Best Spiker"
- 2011 Junior Pan-American Cup "Most Valuable Player"
- 2011 South American Championship "Best Server"
- 2016 Lebanese Volleyball Championship "Most Valuable Player"
- 2016 Lebanese Volleyball Championship "Best Opposite"
- 2016 Lebanese Volleyball Championship "Best Server"

=== National team ===
==== Senior team ====
- 2011 South American Championship - Gold Medal

==== Junior team ====
- 2011 Junior Pan-American Cup - Gold Medal
