= 2025 Men's U21 NORCECA Pan American Cup =

Tournament details
- Host country: Canada
- Dates: 3–11 August 2025
- Teams: 6
- Venue: (in Calgary host cities)

Final positions
- Champions: United States (2nd title)
- Runners-up: Canada
- Third place: Chile

Tournament awards
- MVP: Sebastiano Sani (USA)

The 2025 Men's U21 NORCECA Pan American Cup was the seventh edition of the bi-annual men's volleyball tournament. Six teams participated in this edition held in Calgary.

The United States won their second title, after defeated Canada 3–1 in final. Sebastiano Sani of the United States won the Most Valuable Player award.

== Preliminary round ==
Pos	Team	Pld	W	L	Pts	SPW	SPL	SPR	SW	SL	SR	Qualification
1	United States	5	5	0	24	399	294	1.357	15	1	15.000	Final
2	Canada	5	4	1	20	406	358	1.134	13	4	3.250	Final
3	Chile	5	3	2	14	355	342	1.038	9	7	1.286	Third place match
4	Puerto Rico	5	2	3	10	405	428	0.946	8	11	0.727	Third place match
5	Mexico	5	1	4	7	356	379	0.939	5	12	0.417	
6	Barbados	5	0	5	0	255	375	0.680	0	15	0.000	

Date	Time		Score		Set 1	Set 2	Set 3	Set 4	Set 5	Total	Report
5 Aug	14:30	Mexico	2–3	Puerto Rico	22–25	25–19	19–25	25–19	10–15	101–103	P2 P3
5 Aug	16:30	United States	3–0	Chile	25–15	25–14	25–15			75–44	P2 P3
5 Aug	19:00	Canada	3–0	Barbados	25–14	25–14	25–19			75–47	P2 P3
6 Aug	14:30	United States	3–0	Barbados	25–18	25–23	25–14			75–55	P2 P3
6 Aug	16:30	Chile	3–0	Mexico	25–21	25–17	25–18			75–56	P2 P3
6 Aug	19:00	Canada	3–1	Puerto Rico	25–16	25–21	23–25	25–23		98–85	P2 P3
7 Aug	14:30	Mexico	3–0	Barbados	25–13	25–17	25–17			75–47	P2 P3
7 Aug	16:30	Puerto Rico	1–3	Chile	25–21	16–25	24–26	22–25		87–97	P2 P3
7 Aug	19:00	Canada	1–3	United States	11–25	22–25	25–23	22–25		80–98	P2 P3
8 Aug	14:30	Puerto Rico	3–0	Barbados	25–16	25–18	25–23			75–57	P2 P3
8 Aug	16:30	United States	3–0	Mexico	25–17	25–19	26–24			76–60	P2 P3
8 Aug	19:00	Canada	3–0	Chile	25–20	25–23	25–21			75–64	P2 P3
9 Aug	14:30	Chile	3–0	Barbados	25–13	25–13	25–23			75–49	P2 P3
9 Aug	16:30	United States	3–0	Puerto Rico	25–19	25–18	25–18			75–55	P2 P3
9 Aug	19:00	Canada	3–0	Mexico	28–26	25–19	25–19			78–64	P2 P3

== Final round ==
=== Championship bracket ===
Final
United States	3
Canada	1
Third place
Chile	3
Puerto Rico	0

=== Fifth place match ===
Date	Time		Score		Set 1	Set 2	Set 3	Set 4	Set 5	Total	Report
10 Aug	12:00	Mexico	3–0	Barbados	31–29	25–16	25–17			81–62	P2 P3

=== Third place match ===
Date	Time		Score		Set 1	Set 2	Set 3	Set 4	Set 5	Total	Report
10 Aug	14:00	Chile	3–0	Puerto Rico	25–18	25–23	25–14			75–55	P2 P3

=== Final ===
Date	Time		Score		Set 1	Set 2	Set 3	Set 4	Set 5	Total	Report
10 Aug	16:30	United States	3–1	Canada	26–24	25–21	22–25	25–18		98–88	P2 P3

== Final standing ==
Rank	Team
1st place, gold medalist(s)	United States
2nd place, silver medalist(s)	Canada
3rd place, bronze medalist(s)	Chile
4	Puerto Rico
5	Mexico
6	Barbados

== Individual awards ==
- Most valuable player
  - Sebastiano Sani (USA)
- Best scorer
  - Eliel Salva Torres (PUR)
- Best setter
  - Juan José Vivanco (CHI)
- Best Opposite
  - Daniil Hershtynovich (CAN)
- Best spikers
  - Riggs Guy (USA)
  - Sebastiano Sani (USA)
- Best middle blockers
  - Gabriel Contreras (CHI)
  - Yann Gabriel Colón (PUR)
- Best libero
  - Quintin Greenidge (CAN)
- Best server
  - Owen Harris (CAN)
- Best receiver
  - Quintin Greenidge (CAN)
- Best digger
  - Alfredo Vázquez (MEX)
