= Qatar Volleyball Association =

Governing body of volleyball in Qatar

- Sport: Volleyball
- Abbreviation: QVF
- Affiliation: International Volleyball Federation (FIVB)
- Regional affiliation: Asian Volleyball Confederation
- Headquarters: Doha, Qatar
- (Qatar)

The Qatar Volleyball Association (QVF) is the governing body of volleyball in Qatar.

The Qatar Volleyball Association (QVA) recently held the Regular General Assembly at the QVA's headquarters in the presence of all members of the General Assembly of club representatives. The meeting discussed a number of important topics related to the future of volleyball in Qatar.

== Controversies ==
In 2021 Beach Volleyball world tour, German beach volleyball players Karla Borger and Julia Sude had said Qatar is "the only country" where players are forbidden from wearing bikinis on court. They also mentioned that they will boycott the tournament in Qatar because of the country's tough restrictions on what players wear on court. After players threatened for boycott, the Qatar Volleyball Federation lifted the bikini restrictions.

== See Also ==
- Qatari Volleyball League
- Qatari Women's Volleyball League
