= 2011 Men's Junior Pan-American Volleyball Cup =

Men's volleyball tournament

Tournament details
- Host country: Panama
- Dates: June 22–27, 2011
- Teams: 8
- Venue: 1 (in 1 host city)

Final positions
- Champions: Venezuela (1st title)

Tournament awards
- MVP: Kervin Piñerua (VEN)

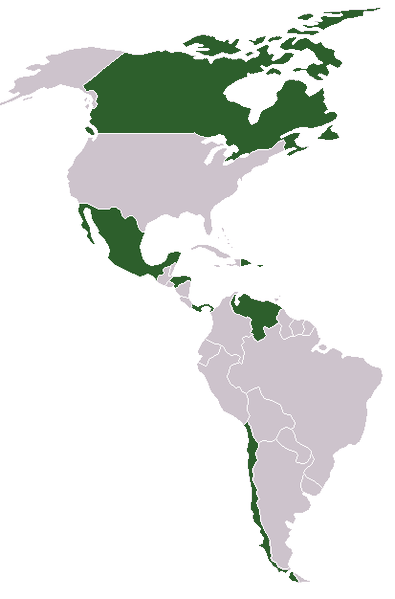
Map of countries that participated in the men’s U-21 Pan American Cup

The 2011 Men's Junior Pan-American Volleyball Cup was the first edition of the annual men's volleyball tournament, played by eight countries from June 22–27, 2011 in Panama City, Panama.

== Competing nations ==
Group A	Group B
Dominican Republic; Honduras; Panama; Venezuela	Canada; Chile; Mexico; Puerto Rico

== Preliminary round ==
=== Group A ===
Pos	Team	Pld	W	L	Pts	SPW	SPL	SPR	SW	SL	SR	Qualification
1	Venezuela	3	3	0	9	226	119	1.899	9	0	MAX	Semifinals
2	Dominican Republic	3	2	1	6	214	170	1.259	6	3	2.000	Quarterfinals
3	Panama	3	1	2	2	194	240	0.808	3	8	0.375	Quarterfinals
4	Honduras	3	0	3	1	149	254	0.587	2	9	0.222	

Date	Time		Score		Set 1	Set 2	Set 3	Set 4	Set 5	Total	Report
22 June	16:00	Venezuela	3–0	Dominican Republic	26–24	25–20	25–20			76–64	P2
22 June	20:00	Panama	3–2	Honduras	20–25	25–19	19–25	25–17	15–4	104–90	P2
23 June	16:00	Venezuela	3–0	Honduras	25–3	25–7	25–9			75–19	P2
23 June	20:00	Dominican Republic	3–0	Panama	25–18	25–17	25–19			75–54	P2
24 June	16:00	Dominican Republic	3–0	Honduras	25–12	25–13	25–15			75–40	P2
24 June	20:00	Panama	0–3	Venezuela	10–25	16–25	10–25			36–75	36–75

=== Group B ===
Pos	Team	Pld	W	L	Pts	SPW	SPL	SPR	SW	SL	SR	Qualification
1	Chile	3	3	0	8	269	255	1.055	9	3	3.000	Semifinals
2	Puerto Rico	3	2	1	6	225	225	1.000	6	4	1.500	Quarterfinals
3	Canada	3	1	2	4	290	277	1.047	6	7	0.857	Quarterfinals
4	Mexico	3	0	3	0	237	264	0.898	2	9	0.222	

Date	Time		Score		Set 1	Set 2	Set 3	Set 4	Set 5	Total	Report
22 June	14:00	Canada	2–3	Chile	25–15	19–25	26–28	25–17	11–15	106–100	P2
22 June	18:00	Puerto Rico	3–0	Mexico	20–18	25–21	25–22			70–61	P2
23 June	14:00	Puerto Rico	0–3	Chile	12–25	22–25	22–25			56–75	P2
23 June	18:00	Canada	3–1	Mexico	25–16	25–22	20–25	25–20		95–83	P2
24 June	14:00	Mexico	1–3	Chile	24–26	23–25	25–18	21–25		93–94	P2
24 June	18:00	Canada	1–3	Puerto Rico	25–17	23–25	25–27	16–25		89–94	89–94

== Final round ==
=== Championship bracket ===
Quarterfinals
B2	Puerto Rico	3
A3	Panama	0
A2	Dominican Republic	0
B3	Canada	3

Semifinals
A1	Venezuela	3
B2	Puerto Rico	1
B1	Chile	0
B3	Canada	3

Finals
A1	Venezuela	3
B3	Canada	1
Third place
B1	Chile	3
A2	Puerto Rico	1

=== 5th–8th places bracket ===
Classification 5/8
Honduras	0
Dominican Republic	3
Mexico	3
Panama	0

5th Place Match
Dominican Republic	2
Mexico	3
7th Place Match
Honduras	0
Panama	3

=== Quarterfinals ===
Date	Time		Score		Set 1	Set 2	Set 3	Set 4	Set 5	Total	Report
25 June	18:00	Puerto Rico	3–0	Panama	25–14	25–14	25–17			75–45	P2
25 June	20:00	Canada	3–0	Dominican Republic	25–17	25–14	25–16			75–47	75–47

=== Classification 5/8 ===
Date	Time		Score		Set 1	Set 2	Set 3	Set 4	Set 5	Total	Report
26 June	14:00	Honduras	0–3	Dominican Republic	8–25	11–25	10–25			29–75	P2
26 June	16:00	Mexico	3–0	Panama	25–19	25–19	25–18			75–56	75–56

=== Semifinals ===
Date	Time		Score		Set 1	Set 2	Set 3	Set 4	Set 5	Total	Report
26 June	18:00	Chile	0–3	Canada	17–25	18–25	23–25			58–75	P2
26 June	20:00	Venezuela	3–1	Puerto Rico	25–21	21–25	25–21	25–20		96–87	96–87

=== Seventh place match ===
Date	Time		Score		Set 1	Set 2	Set 3	Set 4	Set 5	Total	Report
27 June	14:00	Honduras	2–3	Panama	25–22	19–25	27–25	21–25	9–15	101–112	101–112

=== Fifth place match ===
Date	Time		Score		Set 1	Set 2	Set 3	Set 4	Set 5	Total	Report
27 June	16:00	Dominican Republic	2–3	Mexico	25–23	25–20	17–25	21–25	8–15	96–108	101–108

=== Bronze medal match ===
Date	Time		Score		Set 1	Set 2	Set 3	Set 4	Set 5	Total	Report
27 June	18:00	Chile	3–1	Puerto Rico	26–24	19–25	25–22	25–19		95–90	95–90

=== Final ===
Date	Time		Score		Set 1	Set 2	Set 3	Set 4	Set 5	Total	Report
27 June	20:00	Canada	1–3	Venezuela	23–25	25–16	19–25	23–25		90–91	90–91

== Final standing ==
Rank	Team
1st place, gold medalist(s)	Venezuela
2nd place, silver medalist(s)	Canada
3rd place, bronze medalist(s)	Chile
4	Puerto Rico
5	Mexico
6	Dominican Republic
7	Panama
8	Honduras

2011 Men's Junior Pan-American Cup champions

Venezuela
1st title

== Individual awards ==
- Most valuable player
  - Kervin Piñerua (VEN)
- Best scorer
  - Anaury Burgos (DOM)
- Best spiker
  - Nicholas Hoag (CAN)
- Best blocker
  - Domenico Giuria (CHI)
- Best server
  - Jhoser Contreras (VEN)
- Best digger
  - José Mulero (PUR)
- Best setter
  - Jorge Barajas (MEX)
- Best receiver
  - José Mulero (PUR)
- Best libero
  - José Mulero (PUR)
