= 2019 Men's Junior Pan-American Volleyball Cup =

Tournament details
- Host country: Peru
- Dates: May 2 – 12, 2019
- Teams: 8
- Venue: 1 (in Tarapoto host cities)

Final positions
- Champions: Cuba (1st title)

Tournament awards
- MVP: José Romero (CUB)

The 2019 Men's Junior Pan-American Volleyball Cup was the fourth edition of the bi-annual men's volleyball tournament. Eight teams participated in this edition held in Tarapoto, Peru. Cuba defeated Canada in the final match to win the tournament. As Cuba had already qualified for the 2019 Men's U21 World Championship through the NORCECA championship and Canada qualified through world ranking, Puerto Rico as the bronze medalist qualified for the World Championship. José Romero won the MVP award.

== Competing nations ==
Group A	Group B
Cuba; United States; Puerto Rico; Dominican Republic	Canada; Colombia; Chile; Peru

== Competition format ==
- Eight teams will be divided into two pools. In the group stage each pool will play round robin.
- The first rank teams of each pool after group stage will receive byes into the semifinals.
- The second and third rank teams in each pool will play in the quarterfinals.

== Preliminary round ==
- All times are in Peru Standard Time (UTC−05:00)

=== Group A ===
Pos	Team	Pld	W	L	Pts	SPW	SPL	SPR	SW	SL	SR	Qualification
1	Cuba	3	3	0	15	225	163	1.380	9	0	MAX	Semifinals
2	United States	3	1	2	6	225	236	0.953	4	6	0.667	Quarterfinals
3	Puerto Rico	3	1	2	6	249	273	0.912	5	7	0.714	Quarterfinals
4	Dominican Republic	3	1	2	3	224	251	0.892	3	8	0.375	

Date	Time		Score		Set 1	Set 2	Set 3	Set 4	Set 5	Total	Report
5 May	14:00	United States	1–3	Puerto Rico	25–27	25–27	25–21	20–25		95–100	P2 P3
5 May	18:00	Cuba	3–0	Dominican Republic	25–19	25–18	25–23			75–60	P2 P3
6 May	16:00	Puerto Rico	0–3	Cuba	19–25	13–25	16–25			48–75	P2 P3
6 May	18:00	Dominican Republic	0–3	United States	17–25	21–25	23–25			61–75	P2 P3
7 May	16:00	Puerto Rico	2–3	Dominican Republic	25–20	19–25	23–25	25–18	9–15	101–103	P2 P3
7 May	18:00	Cuba	3–0	United States	25–21	25–15	25–19			75–55	P2 P3

=== Group B ===
Pos	Team	Pld	W	L	Pts	SPW	SPL	SPR	SW	SL	SR	Qualification
1	Canada	3	3	0	13	273	181	1.508	9	2	4.500	Semifinals
2	Colombia	3	2	1	8	222	237	0.937	6	5	1.200	Quarterfinals
3	Chile	3	1	2	8	248	260	0.954	6	6	1.000	Quarterfinals
4	Peru	3	0	3	1	189	254	0.744	1	9	0.111	

Date	Time		Score		Set 1	Set 2	Set 3	Set 4	Set 5	Total	Report
5 May	16:00	Canada	3–1	Chile	25–17	25–12	22–25	25–15		97–69	P2 P3
5 May	20:00	Peru	0–3	Colombia	23–25	21–25	17–25			61–75	P2 P3
6 May	14:00	Colombia	0–3	Canada	16–25	15–25	14–25			45–75	P2 P3
6 May	20:00	Peru	0–3	Chile	18–25	26–28	17–25			61–78	P2 P3
7 May	14:00	Chile	2–3	Colombia	18–25	21–25	25–18	25–19	12–15	101–102	P2 P3
7 May	20:00	Peru	1–3	Canada	9–25	26–28	15–25	15–25		65–103	P2 P3

== Final round ==
=== Championship bracket ===
Quarterfinals
A2	United States	2
B3	Chile	3
B2	Colombia	0
A3	Puerto Rico	3

Semifinals
B3	Chile	0
A1	Cuba	3
A3	Puerto Rico	0
B1	Canada	3

Finals
A1	Cuba	3
B1	Canada	0
Third place
B3	Chile	0
A3	Puerto Rico	3

=== Quarterfinals ===
Date	Time		Score		Set 1	Set 2	Set 3	Set 4	Set 5	Total	Report
8 May	16:00	United States	2–3	Chile	26–24	25–17	21–25	24–26	10–15	106–107	P2 P3
8 May	18:00	Colombia	0–3	Puerto Rico	16–25	20–25	31–33			67–83	P2 P3

=== Classification 5/8 ===
Date	Time		Score		Set 1	Set 2	Set 3	Set 4	Set 5	Total	Report
10 May	14:00	Dominican Republic	3–0	Colombia	25–21	25–20	25–20			75–61	P2 P3
10 May	16:00	Peru	2–3	United States	25–20	25–19	20–25	21–25	11–15	102–104	P2 P3

=== Semifinals ===
Date	Time		Score		Set 1	Set 2	Set 3	Set 4	Set 5	Total	Report
10 May	18:00	Cuba	3–0	Chile	25–15	25–17	28–08			78–40	P2 P3
10 May	20:00	Canada	3–0	Puerto Rico	25–19	25–18	25–15			75–52	P2 P3

=== Classification 7/8 ===
Date	Time		Score		Set 1	Set 2	Set 3	Set 4	Set 5	Total	Report
11 May	09:00	Colombia	3–1	Peru	14–25	25–13	27–25	25–20		91–83	P2 P3

=== Classification 5/6 ===
Date	Time		Score		Set 1	Set 2	Set 3	Set 4	Set 5	Total	Report
11 May	11:00	Dominican Republic	2–3	United States	17–25	14–25	25–20	26–24		82–94	P2 P3

=== 3rd place match ===
Date	Time		Score		Set 1	Set 2	Set 3	Set 4	Set 5	Total	Report
11 May	13:00	Chile	0–3	Puerto Rico	21–25	17–25	16–25			54–75	P2 P3

=== Final ===
Date	Time		Score		Set 1	Set 2	Set 3	Set 4	Set 5	Total	Report
11 May	15:00	Cuba	3–0	Canada	25–19	25–22	29–27			79–68	P2 P3

== Final standing ==
Rank	Team
1st place, gold medalist(s)	Cuba
2nd place, silver medalist(s)	Canada
3rd place, bronze medalist(s)	Puerto Rico
4	Chile
5	United States
6	Dominican Republic
7	Colombia
8	Peru

Qualified for FIVB U21 World Championship

2019 Men's Junior Pan-American Cup champions

Cuba
1st title

Team Roster:

Jose Gutierrez, Julio Cardenas, Carlos Charles, Adrian Chirino, Julio Gómez, Henry Pelayo, Gustavo Bolaños, Jose Romero, Luis Alfen, Víctor Andreu,

Raico Altunaga
Head Coach: (Cuba) Jesus Cruz

== Individual awards ==
- Most valuable player
  - José Romero (CUB)
- Best scorer
  - Brett Wildman (USA)
- Best setter
  - Julio Gómez (CUB)
- Best Opposite
  - Xander Ketrzynski (CAN)
- Best outside hitters
  - Julio Cardenas (CUB)
  - José Gutiérrez (CUB)
- Best middle blockers
  - Daniel Aponza (COL)
  - Luis López (COL)
- Best libero
  - Garland Peed (USA)
- Best server
  - Xander Ketrzynski (CAN)
- Best receiver
  - Ryan Wilcox (USA)
- Best digger
  - Landon Currie (CAN)
