= Cuba men's national under-21 volleyball team =

Youth volleyball team representing Cuba

Cuba U21
- Nickname(s): Powerful
- Association: Cuban Volleyball Federation
- Confederation: NORCECA

Uniforms
Home	Away	Third

FIVB U21 World Championship
- Appearances: 15 (First in 1981)
- Best result: (silver) Runners-Up : (1987, 2009, 2017)

NORCECA U21 Championship
- Appearances: 7 (First in 2000)
- Best result: (gold) Champions : (2000, 2004, 2006, 2008, 2014)

The Cuba men's national under-21 volleyball team represents Cuba in international men's volleyball competitions and friendly matches under the age 21 and it is ruled by the Cuban Volleyball Federation body That is an affiliate of the International Volleyball Federation FIVB and also a part of the North, Central America and Caribbean Volleyball Confederation NORCECA.

== Results ==
=== FIVB U21 World Championship ===
Champions Runners up Third place Fourth place

FIVB U21 World Championship
Year	Round	Position	Pld	W	L	SW	SL	Squad
(Brazil) 1977	Didn't qualify							
(United States) 1981		6th place						Squad
(Italy) 1985		Third place						Squad
(Bahrain) 1987		Runners-Up						Squad
(Greece) 1989		5th place						Squad
(Egypt) 1991		8th place						Squad
(Argentina) 1993		11th place						Squad
(Malaysia) 1995	Didn't qualify							
(Bahrain) 1997	Didn't qualify							
(Thailand) 1999	Didn't qualify							
(Poland) 2001		5th place						Squad
(Iran) 2003	Didn't qualify							
(India) 2005		Third place						Squad
(Morocco) 2007		8th place						Squad
(India) 2009		Runners-Up						Squad
(Brazil) 2011	Didn't qualify							
(Turkey) 2013	Didn't qualify							
(Mexico) 2015		13th place						Squad
(Czech Republic) 2017		Runners-Up						Squad
(Bahrain) 2019		10th place						Squad
(Italy) (Bulgaria) 2021		11th place						Squad
(Bahrain) 2023	Didn't qualify							
(China) 2025		7th place						Squad
Total	0 Titles	15/23						

=== NORCECA U21 Championship ===
Champions Runners up Third place Fourth place

NORCECA U21 Championship
Year	Round	Position	Pld	W	L	SW	SL	Squad
(Guatemala) 1998	Didn't enter							
(Cuba) 2000	Final	Champions						Squad
(Canada) 2002	Didn't enter							
(Canada) 2004	Final	Champions						Squad
(Mexico) 2006	Final	Champions						Squad
(El Salvador) 2008	Final	Champions						Squad
(Canada) 2010	Semifinals	4th place						Squad
(United States) 2012	Didn't enter							
(El Salvador) 2014	Final	Champions						Squad
(Canada) 2016	Final	Runners-Up						Squad
Total	5 Titles	7/10						

== Team ==
=== Current squad ===
The following is the Cuban roster in the 2017 FIVB Volleyball Men's U21 World Championship.

Head coach: Nicolas Vives Coffigny

No.	Name	Date of birth	Height	Weight	Spike	Block	2017 club
1	José Israel Alvarez	2 December 1997	1.99 m (6 ft 6 in)	79 kg (174 lb)	349 cm (137 in)	347 cm (137 in)	(Cuba) Guantanamo
2	Osniel Melgarejo	18 December 1997	1.95 m (6 ft 5 in)	83 kg (183 lb)	345 cm (136 in)	320 cm (130 in)	(Greece) Panathinaikos V.C.
3	Marlon Yant Herrera	23 May 2001	2.02 m (6 ft 8 in)	75 kg (165 lb)	345 cm (136 in)	320 cm (130 in)	(Cuba) Villa Clara
5	Javier Octavio Rojas	27 December 1997	2.00 m (6 ft 7 in)	84 kg (185 lb)	356 cm (140 in)	350 cm (140 in)	(Cuba) La Habana
10	Miguel Gutiérrez	21 February 1997	1.97 m (6 ft 6 in)	86 kg (190 lb)	355 cm (140 in)	340 cm (130 in)	(Cuba) Villa Clara
11	Livan Taboada Diaz	4 October 1998	1.91 m (6 ft 3 in)	75 kg (165 lb)	343 cm (135 in)	327 cm (129 in)	(Cuba) La Habana
12	Raciel Cabrera	2 July 1998	1.98 m (6 ft 6 in)	85 kg (187 lb)	345 cm (136 in)	325 cm (128 in)	(Cuba) Pinar del Río
14	Adrian Arredondo (C)	26 June 1998	1.91 m (6 ft 3 in)	80 kg (180 lb)	344 cm (135 in)	340 cm (130 in)	(Cuba) Santic Spiritus
16	Victor Flores	31 August 2001	1.88 m (6 ft 2 in)	72 kg (159 lb)	345 cm (136 in)	338 cm (133 in)	(Cuba) Camagüey
17	Roamy Arce	24 July 1997	2.01 m (6 ft 7 in)	93 kg (205 lb)	350 cm (140 in)	330 cm (130 in)	(Cuba) Matanzas
18	Miguel Angel Castro	25 March 1997	1.89 m (6 ft 2 in)	75 kg (165 lb)	345 cm (136 in)	320 cm (130 in)	(Cuba) Cienfuegos
19	Lionnis Rubiera	25 July 1997	1.85 m (6 ft 1 in)	77 kg (170 lb)	332 cm (131 in)	332 cm (131 in)	Santiago de Cuba
