= Mahmoud Afshardoust =

Iranian volleyball official and player

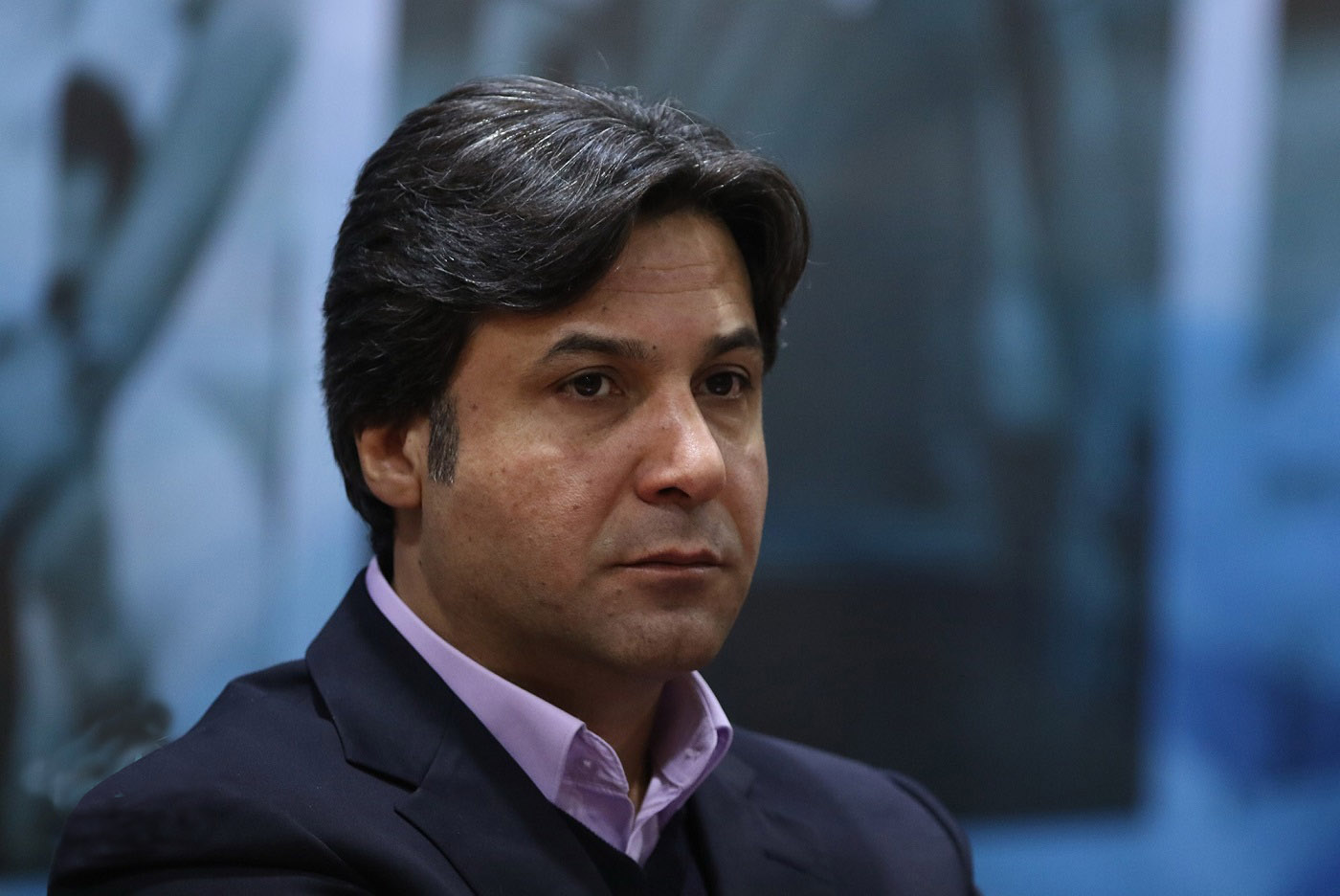

Personal information
- Nationality: (Iran) Iranian
- Born: 22 May 1975 (age 51); Karaj, Iran
- Height: 190 cm (6 ft 3 in)
- Weight: 95 kg (209 lb)

Coaching information
Previous teams coached
Years	Teams
2011; 2009-10	Iran U18; Iran men's national volleyball team

Volleyball information
- Position: Outside spiker

Career
Years	Teams
1991-93; 1994-96; 1997-98; 1999-2004; 2005-06; 2006-07; 2007-08	Shishe va Gaz; Persepolis; Moghavemat Urmia; Paykan Tehran; Sanam Tehran; Pegah Urmia; Still Azin

National team
1991-1994; 1995-2003	Iran U21; Iran
Honours
Representing Iran
Men's volleyball
Asian Games
Gold medal – first place	2014 Incheon	Technical director
Silver medal – second place	2010 Guangzhou	Coach
Silver medal – second place	2002 Busan	Team
Asian Championship
Silver medal – second place	2009 Manila	Coach
Bronze medal – third place	2003 Tianjin	Team
AVC Cup
Gold medal – first place	2010 Urmia	Coach

Mahmoud Afshardoust (Persian: محمود افشاردوست, born 22 March 1975 in Karaj) is the secretary general of the Iranian Volleyball Federation, a former player and coach of the Iran men's national volleyball team. Afshardoust was invited to the national youth team of Iran in 1991, and in 1993 and 1994 he was the captain of the national youth team. In 1994, he became the most valuable (MVP) youth player in Asia. He was invited to the senior national team in 1995, and was in the senior national team until September 2003, won a silver medal in the 2002 Asian Games, and a bronze medal in the 2003 Asian Championship (China). Afshardoust was the coach of the Iranian national team from 2008 to 2010. He won a silver medal at the 2010 Asian Games in Guangzhou, and a silver medal at the 2009 Asian Championships in the Philippines. He was introduced as the Secretary General of the Volleyball Federation of Iran, and resigned from this position in April 2016.

Afshardoust was appointed as the director of the Kish Free Zone Organization's Institute of Healthy Sports and Recreation on April 12, 1997.

Afshardoust is a graduate of Kharazmi University, with a PhD in Sports Management, and has translated and authored several scientific and research articles, as well as five books on volleyball and fitness.

Afshardoust has been a lecturer at Kharazmi University and the Islamic Azad University, Karaj Branch.

== Achievements ==
- Secretary General of the Volleyball Federation of Iran (2012-2018)
- Expert and member of the board of directors of the Volleyball Federation of Iran by order of the Minister of Sports and Youth
- Member of the technical committee of the Volleyball Federation of Iran
- Managing Director of Kish Healthy Sports and Recreation Institute
- Member of the Coach Committee of the Asian Volleyball Confederation AVC
- Technical director of Iran's national adult volleyball team at the 2014 Incheon Asian Games and the 2016 Rio Olympics
- President of the Volleyball Association of the University Sports Federation
- Executive Director of International Tournament hosted by Iran (World League - Asian Championship)
- Holds the highest international coaching qualification (level 3) from the FIVB World Volleyball Federation
- Member of the think tank of the Volleyball Federation of Iran
- Instructor of Iran Volleyball Federation
- Member of Alborz Sports Strategic Council
- Senior Advisor to the executive board of the Sports and Healthy Recreation Committee of the Assembly of Mayors of Iranian Metropolises
- Head of Iran's national team B in the championship of Islamic countries. Indonesia
- Member of the Control and Organizing Committee of the World Student Olympics selected by the World Federation. Chinese Taipei 1396

== Professional career ==
=== As player ===
==== National ====
- Asian Games
  - Silver: Busan, South Korea, 2002
- Asian Championship
  - Bronze: Tianjin, China, 2003

==== Club ====
- Asian Club Championship
  - 1996: with Paykan Tehran
  - 1997: with Paykan Tehran
  - 1999: with Paykan Tehran
  - 2000: with Paykan Tehran
  - 2002: with Paykan Tehran
  - 2004: with Paykan Tehran

=== As Coach ===
==== National ====
- Asian Volleyball Cup (AVC)
  - Gold: Urmia, Iran, 2010
- Asian Games
  - Gold: Incheon, South Korea, 2014 (As Technical director)
  - Silver: Guangzhou, China, 2010
- Asian Championship
  - Silver: Manila, Philippines, 2009
