= Alireza Nadi =

Iranian volleyball player (born 1980)

Personal information
- Full name: Alireza Nadi
- Born: September 2, 1980 (age 46); Tehran, Iran
- Height: 2.00 m (6 ft 6 1/2 in)
- Weight: 90 kg (198 lb)
- Spike: 3.34 m (131 in)
- Block: 3.20 m (126 in)

Volleyball information
- Position: Middle-blocker
- Current club: (Iran) havadar
- Number: 9

Career
Years	Teams
1999–2006; 2006–2008; 2008–2009; 2009–2011; 2011–2012; 2012–2013; 2013–2014; 2014–2015; 2016–2017; 2017–2018	Sanam Tehran; Saipa Tehran; Paykan Tehran; Damash Gilan; Kalleh Mazandaran; Shahrdari Urmia; Barij Essence Kashan; Matin Varamin; Shahrdari Arak; Iranian Gonbad havadar

National team
1997–1998; 1998–1999; 2003–2012	Iran U19; Iran U21; Iran
Honours
Representing Iran
Men's volleyball
Asian Games
Silver medal – second place	2010 Guangzhou	Team
Asian Championship
Gold medal – first place	2011 Tehran	Team
Silver medal – second place	2009 Manila	Team
Bronze medal – third place	2003 Tianjin	Team
AVC Cup
Gold medal – first place	2008 Nakhon Ratchasima	Team
Gold medal – first place	2010 Urmia	Team

Alireza Nadi (Persian: علیرضا نادی, born September 2, 1980) is a former volleyball player from Iran, who played as a middle-blocker for the Men's National Team of the year 2003–2012.

== Honours ==
=== National team ===
- Asian Championship
  - Gold medal (1): 2011
  - Silver medal (1): 2009
  - Bronze medal (1): 2003
- Asian Games
  - Silver medal (1): 2010
- AVC Cup
  - Gold medal (2): 2008, 2010
- West Asian Games
  - Silver medal (1): 2005
- Islamic Solidarity Games
  - Gold medal (1): 2005
- Asian Junior Championship
  - Gold medal (1): 1998

=== Club ===
- Asian Championship
  - Gold medal (6): 2004 (Sanam), 2006, 2007, 2008, 2009, 2011 (Paykan)
  - Silver medal (1): 2002 (Sanam)
  - Bronze medal (1): 2012 (Kalleh)
- Iranian Super League
  - Champions (6): 2001, 2002, 2004, 2005 (Sanam), 2009 (Paykan), 2012 (Kalleh)

=== Individual ===
- MVP: 1998 Asian Junior Championship
- Best blocker: 2008 Asian Club Championship
- Best blocker: 2010 AVC Cup
