= Mohammad Mohammadkazem =

Iranian volleyball player (born 1985)

Personal information
- Full name: Mohammad Mohammadkazem
- Born: September 28, 1985 (age 41); Tehran, Iran
- Height: 2.00 m (6 ft 6 1/2 in)
- Weight: 92 kg (203 lb)
- Spike: 3.50 m (138 in)
- Block: 3.23 m (127 in)

Volleyball information
- Position: Opposite
- Current club: (Iran) Matin Varamin

Career
| Years | Teams |
|---|---|
| 2003–2006; 2006–2007; 2007–2010; 2010–2011; 2012–2013; 2013–2014; 2014–2015; 2015– | Bargh Tehran; Saipa Tehran; Paykan Tehran; Damash Gilan; Shahrdari Urmia; Paykan Tehran; Novin Keshavarz; Matin Varamin |

National team
| 2002–2003; 2004–2005; 2005–2011 | Iran U19; Iran U21; Iran |
Honours
Representing Iran
Men's volleyball
Asian Games
| Silver medal – second place | 2010 Guangzhou | Team |
Asian Championship
| Silver medal – second place | 2009 Manila | Team |
AVC Cup
| Gold medal – first place | 2008 Nakhon Ratchasima | Team |
| Gold medal – first place | 2010 Urmia | Team |

Mohammad Mohammadkazem (Persian: محمد محمدكاظم, born September 28, 1985, in Tehran) is a volleyball player from Iran, who former plays as an Opposite-hitter for the Men's National Team of the year 2005–2011.

== Honours ==
=== National team ===
- Asian Championship
  - Silver medal (1): 2009
- Asian Games
  - Silver medal (1): 2010
- AVC Cup
  - Gold medal (2): 2008, 2010
- Asian Junior Championship
  - Silver medal (1): 2004
- World Youth Championship
  - Bronze medal (1): 2003
- Asian Youth Championship
  - Silver medal (1): 2003

=== Club ===
- Asian Championship
  - Gold medal (4): 2006, 2007, 2008, 2009, 2010 (Paykan)
  - Silver medal (1): 2005 (Saipa)
- Iranian League
  - Champions (2): 2008, 2009, 2010 (Paykan)

=== Individual ===
- Best Server:: 2006 Asian Club Championship
- Best Scorer:: 2007 Asian Championship
