= AVC Men's Volleyball Champions League =

Asian men's club volleyball tournament

AVC Men's Champions League
- Most recent season or competition: 2026 AVC Men's Volleyball Champions League
- Formerly: AVC Cup Men's Club Tournament (1999–2003); Asian Men's Club Volleyball Championship (2004–2024)
- Sport: volleyball
- Founded: 1999; 27 years ago
- First season: 1999
- Organizing body: AVC
- No. of teams: 12
- Continents: Asia and Oceania
- Most recent champion: (Indonesia) Jakarta Bhayangkara Presisi (2026)
- Most titles: (Iran) Paykan Tehran (8 titles)
- Qualification: FIVB Men's Club World Championship
- Streaming partner: Volleyball TV
- Website: asianvolleyball.net

The AVC Men's Volleyball Champions League is an annual continental club volleyball competition organised by the Asian Volleyball Confederation (AVC), and contested by Asia and Oceania's top-division volleyball clubs. It is the most prestigious club competition in Asia and Oceanian volleyball, played by the national league champions (and, for some nations, one or more runners-up) of their national federations.

Introduced in 1999 as the AVC Cup Men's Club Tournament, the competition rebranded as Asian Men's Club Volleyball Championship in 2004. It was rebranded again in 2025 to its current name.

Despite its name implying a league format, the competition is structured as a tournament featuring 12 elite clubs from across Asia and Oceania. The champion and runner-up of the competition earn qualification for the prestigious FIVB Men's Volleyball Club World Championship.

The most successful club in the competition is Paykan Tehran with a total of eight titles. Iran's teams have been dominating the tournament by winning 17 times, the most for any nation. The current Asian club champions are Jakarta Bhayangkara Presisi from Indonesia, who defeated Foolad Sirjan Iranian from Iran (3–0) in the 2026 final.

== History ==
The competition began in 1999 when the Asian Volleyball Confederation (AVC) announced the establishment of the first official men's and women's club championships, to be held under its supervision. The tournament was initially known as the AVC Cup Men's Club Volleyball Tournament for its first four editions, before being renamed the Asian Men's Club Volleyball Championship in 2004.

The inaugural edition was played in a round-robin format. From 2000 to 2004, the competition adopted a two-round system: a preliminary round (featuring a pool round, from which the top four teams advanced) followed by a final round (consisting of semi-finals and a final). In 2005, the tournament reverted to a round-robin format. Between 2006 and 2009, it once again featured two rounds: preliminary and final rounds. Currently, the tournament follows a similar format to the 2006–2009 editions, but the final stage now includes quarter-finals, semi-finals, and a final.

Starting with the 2025 edition, the tournament will be rebranded as the AVC Men's Volleyball Champions League.

== Competition formula ==
=== Qualification ===
The tournament features a maximum of 12 participating teams, with the host country automatically qualifying. The host nation is permitted to field up to two teams in the competition. Other teams will qualify through the designated qualification pathway established for that particular year.

For the 2025 edition, all remaining participating teams were granted entry by invitation only.

=== Final tournament ===
The tournament consists of two rounds: a preliminary round (pool phase) and a final round (direct elimination phase). During the preliminary round, the 12 qualified teams are divided into four pools—labeled A through D—each containing three teams. Within each pool, teams compete in a round-robin format, with each team playing against the other two teams once. Following the pool phase, the top two teams from each pool advance to the final round, which includes the quarter-finals, semi-finals, and the final match.

=== Prize money ===
The teams advancing to the semifinals of this competition will be awarded a total prize of US$50,000 by the Asian Volleyball Confederation (AVC). This marks the first time that a prize has been introduced in an AVC event in 2025.

- Champions: US$20,000
- Runners-up: US$15,000
- Third place: US$10,000
- Fourth place: US$5,000

== Results ==
#	Year	Host	Final			Third place match			Teams
#	Year	Host	Champions	Score	Runners-up	3rd place	Score	4th place	Teams
1	1999; Details	(China); Hefei	(China); Sichuan Fulan	Round-robin	(South Korea); Samsung Fire	(Iran); Paykan Tehran	Round-robin	(China); Chengdu Enwei	6
2	2000; Details	(Thailand); Suphanburi	(South Korea); Samsung Fire	3–1	(Iran); Paykan Tehran	(China); Jin Han Wang	3–1	(Thailand); PTT	8
3	2001; Details	(China); Shehong	(South Korea); Samsung Fire	3–0	(Japan); Suntory Sunbirds	(China); Shanghai Cable TV	3–1	(China); Sichuan Fulan	7
4	2002; Details	(Iran); Tehran	(Iran); Paykan Tehran	3–1	(Iran); Sanam Tehran	(Kazakhstan); Atyrau	3–1	(Qatar); Al Rayyan	6
–	2003	(Indonesia); Jakarta	Canceled due to 2002–2004 SARS outbreak						
5	2004; Details	(Iran); Tehran	(Iran); Sanam Tehran	3–0	(Iran); Paykan Tehran	(Kazakhstan); Atyrau	3–0	(China); Shanghai Oriental	7
6	2005; Details	(Pakistan); Islamabad	(Kazakhstan); Rahat CSKA	Round-robin	(Iran); Saipa Tehran	(China); Shanghai Oriental	Round-robin	(Pakistan); Habib Bank Limited	7
7	2006; Details	(Vietnam); Hanoi	(Iran); Paykan Tehran	3–1	(Kazakhstan); Rahat CSKA	(Indonesia); Jakarta BNI Taplus	3–2	(Thailand); Army	10
8	2007; Details	(Bahrain); Manama	(Iran); Paykan Tehran	3–0	(Saudi Arabia); Al Hilal	(Qatar); Al Arabi	3–1	(Bahrain); Al Najma	12
9	2008; Details	(Kazakhstan); Almaty	(Iran); Paykan Tehran	3–1	(Kazakhstan); Rahat Almaty	(Japan); Suntory Sunbirds	3–2	(United Arab Emirates); Al Nasr	8
10	2009; Details	(United Arab Emirates); Dubai	(Iran); Paykan Tehran	3–0	(Saudi Arabia); Al Hilal	(Qatar); Al Arabi	3–0	(United Arab Emirates); Al Nasr	13
11	2010; Details	(China); Zhenjiang	(Iran); Paykan Tehran	3–1	(Qatar); Al Arabi	(Japan); Panasonic Panthers	3–0	(China); Shanghai Tang Dynasty	10
12	2011; Details	(Indonesia); Palembang	(Iran); Paykan Tehran	3–0	(Kazakhstan); Rahat Almaty	(China); Shanghai Tang Dynasty	3–0	(Japan); Osaka Blazers Sakai	12
13	2012; Details	(China); Shanghai	(Qatar); Al Arabi	3–1	(China); Shanghai Tang Dynasty	(Iran); Kalleh Mazandaran	3–0	(Kazakhstan); Rahat Almaty	16
14	2013; Details	(Iran); Tehran	(Iran); Kalleh Mazandaran	3–1	(Qatar); Al Rayyan	(Chinese Taipei); Taiwan Power	3–0	(China); Liaoning	13
15	2014; Details	(Philippines); Pasay	(Iran); Matin Varamin	3–1	(Qatar); Al Rayyan	(China); Beijing BAIC Motor	3–0	(Kazakhstan); Kondensat Zhaikmunay	16
16	2015; Details	(Taiwan); Taipei	(Chinese Taipei); Taichung Bank	3–1	(Qatar); Al Arabi	(Iran); Paykan Tehran	3–1	(Kazakhstan); Pavlodar	16
17	2016; Details	(Myanmar); Naypyidaw	(Iran); Sarmayeh Bank Tehran	3–1	(Qatar); Al Arabi	(Japan); Toyoda Gosei Trefuerza	3–2	(China); Shanghai Golden Age	14
18	2017; Details	(Vietnam); Ninh Bình / Nam Định	(Iran); Sarmayeh Bank Tehran	3–0	(Japan); Toyoda Gosei Trefuerza	(Qatar); Al Arabi	3–1	(Kazakhstan); Altay	13
19	2018; Details	(Myanmar); Naypyidaw	(Iran); Khatam Ardakan	3–0	(Kazakhstan); Atyrau	(Pakistan); Wapda	3–2	(Vietnam); Sanest Khánh Hòa	13
20	2019; Details	(Taiwan); Taipei	(Iran); Shahrdari Varamin	3–2	(Japan); Panasonic Panthers	(Qatar); Al Rayyan	3–0	(India); Chennai Spartans	14
–	2020	(Thailand); Nakhon Ratchasima	Canceled due to COVID-19 pandemic						
21	2021; Details	(Thailand); Nakhon Ratchasima	(Iran); Foolad Sirjan Iranian	3–1	(Qatar); Al Arabi	(Kazakhstan); Burevestnik Almaty	3–0	(Thailand); Nakhon Ratchasima QminC	10
22	2022; Details	(Iran); Tehran	(Iran); Paykan Tehran	3–2	(Japan); Suntory Sunbirds	(Iran); Shahdab Yazd	3–0	(Kazakhstan); Taraz	8
23	2023; Details	(Bahrain); Manama	(Japan); Suntory Sunbirds	3–1	(Indonesia); Jakarta Bhayangkara Presisi	(Qatar); Police SC	3–1	(Iran); Shahdab Yazd	16
24	2024; Details	(Iran); Yazd	(Iran); Foolad Sirjan Iranian	3–0	(Iran); Shahdab Yazd	(Indonesia); Jakarta Bhayangkara Presisi	3–0	(Kazakhstan); Pavlodar	8
25	2025; Details	(Japan); Hirakata / Kyoto	(Qatar); Al-Rayyan Sports Club	3–0	(Japan); Osaka Bluteon	(Japan); Suntory Sunbirds Osaka	3–0	(Iran); Foolad Sirjan Iranian	12
26	2026; Details	(Indonesia); Pontianak	(Indonesia); Jakarta Bhayangkara Presisi	3–1	(Iran); Foolad Sirjan Iranian	(Japan); JTEKT Stings Aichi	3–0	(South Korea); Hyundai Capital Skywalkers	8

== Performances by club ==
Club	Champions	Runners-up	Third place	Years champions	Years runners-up	Years third place
(Iran) Paykan Tehran	8	2	2	2002, 2006, 2007, 2008, 2009, 2010, 2011, 2022	2000, 2004	1999, 2015
(South Korea) Samsung Fire	2	1	0	2000, 2001	1999	—
(Iran) Foolad Sirjan Iranian	2	1	0	2021, 2024	2026	—
(Iran) Shahrdari Varamin	2	0	0	2014, 2019	—	—
(Iran) Sarmayeh Bank Tehran	2	0	0	2016, 2017	—	—
(Qatar) Al Arabi	1	4	3	2012	2010, 2015, 2016, 2021	2007, 2009, 2017
(Japan) Suntory Sunbirds Osaka	1	2	2	2023	2001, 2022	2008, 2025
(Qatar) Al-Rayyan Sports Club	1	2	1	2025	2013, 2014	2019
(Indonesia) Jakarta Bhayangkara Presisi	1	1	1	2026	2023	2024
(Iran) Sanam Tehran	1	1	0	2004	2002	—
(Kazakhstan) Rahat CSKA	1	1	0	2005	2006	—
(Iran) Kalleh Mazandaran	1	0	1	2013	—	2012
(China) Sichuan	1	0	0	1999	—	—
(Chinese Taipei) Taichung Bank	1	0	0	2015	—	—
(Iran) Khatam Ardakan	1	0	0	2018	—	—
(Japan) Osaka Bluteon	0	2	1	—	2019, 2025	2010
(Saudi Arabia) Al Hilal	0	2	0	—	2007, 2009	—
(Kazakhstan) Rahat Almaty	0	2	0	—	2008, 2011	—
(China) Shanghai Bright	0	1	3	—	2012	2001, 2005, 2011
(Kazakhstan) Atyrau	0	1	2	—	2018	2002, 2004
(Japan) Toyoda Gosei Trefuerza	0	1	1	—	2017	2016
(Iran) Shahdab Yazd	0	1	1	—	2024	2022
(Iran) Saipa Tehran	0	1	0	—	2005	—
(China) Jin Han Wang	0	0	1	—	—	2000
(Indonesia) Jakarta BNI 46	0	0	1	—	—	2006
(Chinese Taipei) Taiwan Power	0	0	1	—	—	2013
(China) Beijing BAIC Motor	0	0	1	—	—	2014
(Pakistan) Wapda	0	0	1	—	—	2018
(Kazakhstan) Burevestnik Almaty	0	0	1	—	—	2021
(Qatar) Police SC	0	0	1	—	—	2023
(Japan) JTEKT Stings Aichi	0	0	1	—	—	2026

== Performances by country ==
Country	Champions	Runners-up	Third place	Years champions	Years runners-up	Years third place
Iran	17	6	4	2002, 2004, 2006, 2007, 2008, 2009, 2010, 2011, 2013, 2014, 2016, 2017, 2018, 2019, 2021, 2022, 2024	2000, 2002, 2004, 2005, 2024, 2026	1999, 2012, 2015, 2022
Qatar	2	6	5	2012, 2025	2010, 2013, 2014, 2015, 2016, 2021	2007, 2009, 2017, 2019, 2023
South Korea	2	1	0	2000, 2001	1999	—
Japan	1	5	5	2023	2001, 2017, 2019, 2022, 2025	2008, 2010, 2016, 2025, 2026
Kazakhstan	1	4	3	2005	2006, 2008, 2011, 2018	2002, 2004, 2021
China	1	1	5	1999	2012	2000, 2001, 2005, 2011, 2014
Indonesia	1	1	2	2026	2023	2006, 2024
Chinese Taipei	1	0	1	2015	—	2013
Saudi Arabia	0	2	0	—	2007, 2009	—
Pakistan	0	0	1	—	—	2018

== Performances by zonal association ==
Zonal association	Champions	Runners-up	Third place
CAVA	18	10	8
EAVA	5	7	11
WAVA	2	8	5
SAVA	1	1	2
Total	26	26	26

== Hosts ==
List of hosts by number of championships hosted.

Times hosted	Nations	Year(s)
5	Iran	2002, 2004, 2013, 2022, 2024
4	China	1999, 2001, 2010, 2012
2	Thailand	2000, 2021
2	Vietnam	2006, 2017
2	Bahrain	2007, 2023
2	Taiwan	2015, 2019
2	Myanmar	2016, 2018
2	Indonesia	2011, 2026
1	Pakistan	2005
1	Kazakhstan	2008
1	United Arab Emirates	2009
1	Philippines	2014
1	Japan	2025

== Medals ==
As of 2026 AVC Men's Volleyball Champions League.

Rank	Nation	Gold	Silver	Bronze	Total
1	Iran	17	6	4	27
2	Qatar	2	6	5	13
3	South Korea	2	1	0	3
4	Japan	1	5	5	11
5	Kazakhstan	1	4	3	8
6	China	1	1	5	7
7	Indonesia	1	1	2	4
8	Chinese Taipei	1	0	1	2
9	Saudi Arabia	0	2	0	2
10	Pakistan	0	0	1	1
Totals (10 entries)		26	26	26	78

== MVP by edition ==
- 1999 – Zhang Xiang (CHN) (Sichuan Fulan)
- 2000 – Kim Se-jin (KOR) (Samsung Fire)
- 2001 – Shin Jin-sik (KOR) (Samsung Fire)
- 2002 – Behnam Mahmoudi (IRI) (Paykan Tehran)
- 2003 – tournament canceled
- 2004 – Mohammad Torkashvand (IRI) (Sanam Tehran)
- 2005 – not awarded
- 2006 – Mohammad Soleimani (IRI) (Paykan Tehran)
- 2007 – Mohammad Soleimani (IRI) (Paykan Tehran)
- 2008 – Marat Imangaliyev (KAZ) (Rahat Almaty)
- 2009 – Hicham Guemmadi (ALG) (Al Nasr)
- 2010 – Peyman Akbari (IRI) (Paykan Tehran)
- 2011 – Hamzeh Zarini (IRI) (Paykan Tehran)
- 2012 – Salvador Hidalgo (CUB) (Al Arabi)
- 2013 – Hamzeh Zarini (IRI) (Kalleh Mazandaran)
- 2014 – Shahram Mahmoudi (IRI) (Matin Varamin)
- 2015 – Huang Pei-hung (TPE) (Taichung Bank)
- 2016 – Shahram Mahmoudi (IRI) (Sarmayeh Bank Tehran)
- 2017 – Shahram Mahmoudi (IRI) (Sarmayeh Bank Tehran)
- 2018 – Hamzeh Zarini (IRI) (Khatam Ardakan)
- 2019 – Alireza Jalali (IRI) (Shahrdari Varamin)
- 2020 – tournament canceled
- 2021 – Saber Kazemi (IRI) (Foolad Sirjan Iranian)
- 2022 – Saeid Marouf (IRI) (Paykan Tehran)
- 2023 – Dmitry Muserskiy (RUS) (Suntory Sunbirds)
- 2024 – Ali Hajipour (IRI) (Foolad Sirjan Iranian)
- 2025 – Nimir Abdel-Aziz (NED) (Al-Rayyan Sports Club)
- 2026 – Noumory Keita (MLI) (Jakarta Bhayangkara Presisi)

== See also ==
- AVC Women's Volleyball Champions League
