= 2011 Asian Men's Club Volleyball Championship =

2011 Asian Club Championship

Tournament details
- Host country: Indonesia
- Dates: 23–30 July
- Teams: 12
- Venue: 1 (in 1 host city)

Final positions
- Champions: (Iran) Paykan Tehran (7th title)

Tournament awards
- MVP: (Iran) Hamzeh Zarini

The 2011 Asian Men's Club Volleyball Championship was the 12th staging of the AVC Club Championships. The tournament was held in Palembang Sport and Convention Center, Palembang, South Sumatra, Indonesia.

== Pools composition ==
The teams are seeded based on their final ranking at the 2010 Asian Men's Club Volleyball Championship.

Pool A	Pool B
Indonesia (Host); Japan (3rd); China (4th); Afghanistan; Uzbekistan; Vietnam	Iran (1st); Qatar (2nd); Kazakhstan (5th); Turkmenistan; Thailand; Myanmar

== Preliminary round ==
=== Pool A ===
Pos	Team	Pld	W	L	Pts	SPW	SPL	SPR	SW	SL	SR	Qualification
1	(Japan) Osaka Blazers Sakai	5	4	1	12	445	370	1.203	14	5	2.800	Quarterfinals
2	(China) Shanghai Tang Dynasty	5	4	1	12	432	367	1.177	14	5	2.800	Quarterfinals
3	(Vietnam) PTCS	5	3	2	10	480	426	1.127	13	8	1.625	Quarterfinals
4	(Indonesia) Bank Sumsel Babel	5	3	2	8	380	360	1.056	9	8	1.125	Quarterfinals
5	(Uzbekistan) Uzbektelecom	5	1	4	3	316	373	0.847	3	12	0.250	
6	(Afghanistan) Etisalat	5	0	5	0	221	378	0.585	0	15	0.000	

Date	Time		Score		Set 1	Set 2	Set 3	Set 4	Set 5	Total	Report
23 Jul	10:50	Bank Sumsel Babel (Indonesia)	3–2	(Vietnam) PTCS	25–23	18–25	21–25	25–20	15–11	104–104	Report
23 Jul	14:00	Shanghai Tang Dynasty (China)	3–0	(Afghanistan) Etisalat	25–7	25–13	25–15			75–35	Report
23 Jul	18:00	Osaka Blazers Sakai (Japan)	3–0	(Uzbekistan) Uzbektelecom	25–16	28–26	25–22			78–64	Report
24 Jul	12:00	PTCS (Vietnam)	3–0	(Afghanistan) Etisalat	25–12	25–18	25–10			75–40	Report
24 Jul	16:00	Bank Sumsel Babel (Indonesia)	3–0	(Uzbekistan) Uzbektelecom	25–21	25–18	25–17			75–56	Report
24 Jul	20:00	Shanghai Tang Dynasty (China)	2–3	(Japan) Osaka Blazers Sakai	25–21	18–25	19–25	25–21	13–15	100–107	Report
25 Jul	10:00	Uzbektelecom (Uzbekistan)	0–3	(Vietnam) PTCS	15–25	32–34	18–25			65–84	Report
25 Jul	14:00	Etisalat (Afghanistan)	0–3	(Japan) Osaka Blazers Sakai	10–25	19–25	6–25			35–75	Report
25 Jul	18:00	Bank Sumsel Babel (Indonesia)	0–3	(China) Shanghai Tang Dynasty	22–25	20–25	18–25			60–75	Report
26 Jul	10:00	PTCS (Vietnam)	3–2	(Japan) Osaka Blazers Sakai	25–23	22–25	25–23	17–25	16–14	105–110	Report
26 Jul	14:00	Uzbektelecom (Uzbekistan)	0–3	(China) Shanghai Tang Dynasty	19–25	18–25	16–25			53–75	Report
26 Jul	18:00	Etisalat (Afghanistan)	0–3	(Indonesia) Bank Sumsel Babel	19–25	15–25	16–25			50–75	Report
27 Jul	12:00	Shanghai Tang Dynasty (China)	3–2	(Vietnam) PTCS	22–25	16–25	29–27	25–22	15–13	107–112	Report
27 Jul	16:00	Osaka Blazers Sakai (Japan)	3–0	(Indonesia) Bank Sumsel Babel	25–21	25–23	25–22			75–66	Report
27 Jul	20:00	Uzbektelecom (Uzbekistan)	3–0	(Afghanistan) Etisalat	25–18	28–26	25–17			78–61	Report

=== Pool B ===
Pos	Team	Pld	W	L	Pts	SPW	SPL	SPR	SW	SL	SR	Qualification
1	(Iran) Paykan Tehran	5	5	0	15	416	323	1.288	15	2	7.500	Quarterfinals
2	(Kazakhstan) Almaty	5	4	1	12	399	343	1.163	13	3	4.333	Quarterfinals
3	(Qatar) Al-Rayyan	5	3	2	8	428	407	1.052	10	9	1.111	Quarterfinals
4	(Thailand) Chang	5	2	3	7	368	375	0.981	8	9	0.889	Quarterfinals
5	(Myanmar) Asia World	5	1	4	2	365	422	0.865	4	14	0.286	
6	(Turkmenistan) Talyp Sporty Ashgabat	5	0	5	1	318	424	0.750	2	15	0.133	

Date	Time		Score		Set 1	Set 2	Set 3	Set 4	Set 5	Total	Report
23 Jul	12:00	Paykan Tehran (Iran)	3–1	(Qatar) Al-Rayyan	25–19	25–13	17–25	25–17		92–74	Report
23 Jul	16:00	Almaty (Kazakhstan)	3–0	(Myanmar) Asia World	25–20	25–17	25–20			75–57	Report
23 Jul	20:00	Chang (Thailand)	3–0	(Turkmenistan) Talyp Sporty Ashgabat	25–20	25–22	25–16			75–58	Report
24 Jul	10:00	Al-Rayyan (Qatar)	3–1	(Myanmar) Asia World	25–19	27–29	25–18	25–20		102–86	Report
24 Jul	14:00	Paykan Tehran (Iran)	3–0	(Turkmenistan) Talyp Sporty Ashgabat	25–15	25–15	25–22			75–52	Report
24 Jul	18:00	Almaty (Kazakhstan)	3–0	(Thailand) Chang	25–14	25–20	25–23			75–57	Report
25 Jul	12:00	Talyp Sporty Ashgabat (Turkmenistan)	0–3	(Qatar) Al-Rayyan	18–25	16–25	14–25			48–75	Report
25 Jul	16:00	Asia World (Myanmar)	0–3	(Thailand) Chang	14–25	22–25	19–25			55–75	Report
25 Jul	20:00	Paykan Tehran (Iran)	3–1	(Kazakhstan) Almaty	25–22	24–26	25–18	25–18		99–84	Report
26 Jul	12:00	Al-Rayyan (Qatar)	3–2	(Thailand) Chang	25–18	28–26	24–26	20–25	15–11	112–106	Report
26 Jul	16:00	Talyp Sporty Ashgabat (Turkmenistan)	0–3	(Kazakhstan) Almaty	38–40	14–25	13–25			65–90	Report
26 Jul	20:00	Asia World (Myanmar)	0–3	(Iran) Paykan Tehran	21–25	20–25	17–25			58–75	Report
27 Jul	10:00	Almaty (Kazakhstan)	3–0	(Qatar) Al-Rayyan	25–22	25–23	25–20			75–65	Report
27 Jul	14:00	Chang (Thailand)	0–3	(Iran) Paykan Tehran	18–25	19–25	18–25			55–75	Report
27 Jul	18:00	Talyp Sporty Ashgabat (Turkmenistan)	2–3	(Myanmar) Asia World	25–21	14–25	25–23	21–25	10–15	95–109	Report

== Classification 9th–12th ==
9th–12th places
28 July – Palembang
(Uzbekistan) Uzbektelecom	2
(Turkmenistan) Talyp Sporty	3
28 July – Palembang
(Myanmar) Asia World	3
(Afghanistan) Etisalat	0

9th place
29 July – Palembang
(Turkmenistan) Talyp Sporty	2
(Myanmar) Asia World	3
11th place
29 July – Palembang
(Uzbekistan) Uzbektelecom	3
(Afghanistan) Etisalat	2

=== Semifinals ===
Date	Time		Score		Set 1	Set 2	Set 3	Set 4	Set 5	Total	Report
28 Jul	10:00	Uzbektelecom (Uzbekistan)	2–3	(Turkmenistan) Talyp Sporty Ashgabat	21–25	25–23	16–25	25–23	14–16	101–112	Report
28 Jul	12:00	Asia World (Myanmar)	3–0	(Afghanistan) Etisalat	25–17	25–17	25–11			75–45	Report

=== 11th place ===
Date	Time		Score		Set 1	Set 2	Set 3	Set 4	Set 5	Total	Report
29 Jul	08:00	Uzbektelecom (Uzbekistan)	3–2	(Afghanistan) Etisalat	21–25	25–22	21–25	25–11	15–11	107–94	Report

=== 9th place ===
Date	Time		Score		Set 1	Set 2	Set 3	Set 4	Set 5	Total	Report
29 Jul	10:00	Talyp Sporty Ashgabat (Turkmenistan)	2–3	(Myanmar) Asia World	29–27	23–25	31–29	25–27	9–15	117–123	Report

== Final round ==
Quarterfinals
28 July – Palembang
(Japan) Sakai	3
(Thailand) Chang	1
28 July – Palembang
(Kazakhstan) Almaty	3
(Vietnam) PTCS	0
28 July – Palembang
(Iran) Paykan	3
(Indonesia) Bank Sumsel	1
28 July – Palembang
(China) Shanghai	3
(Qatar) Al-Rayyan	0

Semifinals
29 July – Palembang
(Japan) Sakai	1
(Kazakhstan) Almaty	3
29 July – Palembang
(Iran) Paykan	3
(China) Shanghai	0

Final
30 July – Palembang
(Kazakhstan) Almaty	0
(Iran) Paykan	3
3rd place
30 July – Palembang
(Japan) Sakai	0
(China) Shanghai	3

5th–8th places
29 July – Palembang
(Thailand) Chang	3
(Vietnam) PTCS	1
29 July – Palembang
(Indonesia) Bank Sumsel	3
(Qatar) Al-Rayyan	0

5th place
30 July – Palembang
(Thailand) Chang	3
(Indonesia) Bank Sumsel	1
7th place
30 July – Palembang
(Vietnam) PTCS	1
(Qatar) Al-Rayyan	3

=== Quarterfinals ===
Date	Time		Score		Set 1	Set 2	Set 3	Set 4	Set 5	Total	Report
28 Jul	14:00	Osaka Blazers Sakai (Japan)	3–1	(Thailand) Chang	20–25	25–21	25–22	25–20		95–88	Report
28 Jul	16:00	Paykan Tehran (Iran)	3–1	(Indonesia) Bank Sumsel Babel	25–14	25–18	25–27	25–23		100–82	Report
28 Jul	18:00	Shanghai Tang Dynasty (China)	3–0	(Qatar) Al-Rayyan	25–20	25–23	25–9			75–52	Report
28 Jul	20:00	Almaty (Kazakhstan)	3–0	(Vietnam) PTCS	27–25	25–18	25–21			77–64	Report

=== 5th–8th semifinals ===
Date	Time		Score		Set 1	Set 2	Set 3	Set 4	Set 5	Total	Report
29 Jul	15:00	Chang (Thailand)	3–1	(Vietnam) PTCS	23–25	25–16	25–17	25–18		98–76	Report
29 Jul	17:00	Bank Sumsel Babel (Indonesia)	3–0	(Qatar) Al-Rayyan	25–23	26–24	25–16			76–63	Report

=== Semifinals ===
Date	Time		Score		Set 1	Set 2	Set 3	Set 4	Set 5	Total	Report
29 Jul	19:00	Osaka Blazers Sakai (Japan)	1–3	(Kazakhstan) Almaty	26–24	23–25	16–25	21–25		86–99	Report
29 Jul	21:00	Paykan Tehran (Iran)	3–0	(China) Shanghai Tang Dynasty	25–21	25–21	25–17			75–59	Report

=== 7th place ===
Date	Time		Score		Set 1	Set 2	Set 3	Set 4	Set 5	Total	Report
30 Jul	13:00	PTCS (Vietnam)	0–3	(Qatar) Al-Rayyan	22–25	24–26	22–25			68–76	Report

=== 5th place ===
Date	Time		Score		Set 1	Set 2	Set 3	Set 4	Set 5	Total	Report
30 Jul	15:00	Chang (Thailand)	3–1	(Indonesia) Bank Sumsel Babel	25–23	20–25	25–22	25–17		95–87	Report

=== 3rd place ===
Date	Time		Score		Set 1	Set 2	Set 3	Set 4	Set 5	Total	Report
30 Jul	17:00	Osaka Blazers Sakai (Japan)	0–3	(China) Shanghai Tang Dynasty	16–25	20–25	17–25			53–75	Report

=== Final ===
Date	Time		Score		Set 1	Set 2	Set 3	Set 4	Set 5	Total	Report
30 Jul	19:00	Almaty (Kazakhstan)	0–3	(Iran) Paykan Tehran	16–25	15–25	19–25			50–75	Report

== Final standing ==
Rank	Team
1st place, gold medalist(s)	(Iran) Paykan Tehran
2nd place, silver medalist(s)	(Kazakhstan) Almaty
3rd place, bronze medalist(s)	(China) Shanghai Tang Dynasty
4	(Japan) Osaka Blazers Sakai
5	(Thailand) Chang
6	(Indonesia) Bank Sumsel Babel
7	(Qatar) Al-Rayyan
8	(Vietnam) PTCS
9	(Myanmar) Asia World
10	(Turkmenistan) Talyp Sporty Ashgabat
11	(Uzbekistan) Uzbektelecom
12	(Afghanistan) Etisalat

Qualified for the 2011 Club World Championship

== Awards ==
- MVP: (Iran) Hamzeh Zarini (Paykan)
- Best scorer: (Japan) Daisaku Nishio (Sakai)
- Best spiker: (Iran) Mehdi Bazargard (Paykan)
- Best blocker: (Iran) Hesam Bakhsheshi (Paykan)
- Best server: (Iran) Hamzeh Zarini (Paykan)
- Best setter: (Japan) Shun Imamura (Sakai)
- Best libero: (Japan) Yusuke Inoue (Sakai)
