= 2007 Asian Men's Club Volleyball Championship =

2007 Asian Club Championship

Tournament details
- Host country: Bahrain
- Dates: 1–8 June
- Teams: 12
- Venues: 2 (in 1 host city)

Final positions
- Champions: (Iran) Paykan Tehran (3rd title)

Tournament awards
- MVP: (Iran) Mohammad Soleimani

The 2007 Asian Men's Club Volleyball Championship was the 8th staging of the AVC Club Championships. The tournament was held in Manama, bahrain. Paykan of Iran won the tournament after beating Al-Hilal of Saudi Arabia.

== Pools composition ==
The teams are seeded based on their final ranking at the 2006 Asian Men's Club Volleyball Championship.

Pool A	Pool B
Bahrain (Host); Indonesia (3rd); Japan; Qatar; Thailand; Uzbekistan	Iran (1st); Kazakhstan (2nd); China; Saudi Arabia; Myanmar; United Arab Emirates

== Preliminary round ==
=== Pool A ===
Pos	Team	Pld	W	L	Pts	SW	SL	SR	SPW	SPL	SPR	Qualification
1	(Bahrain) Al-Najma	5	4	1	9	14	5	2.800	434	359	1.209	Semifinals
2	(Qatar) Al-Arabi	5	4	1	9	13	5	2.600	425	357	1.190	Semifinals
3	Garuda Indonesia	5	4	1	9	14	7	2.000	465	462	1.006	5th–8th place
4	(Japan) Suntory Sunbirds	5	2	3	7	8	10	0.800	401	394	1.018	5th–8th place
5	(Thailand) Sang Som	5	1	4	6	5	13	0.385	361	441	0.819	9th–12th place
6	(Uzbekistan) AGMK	5	0	5	5	1	15	0.067	323	396	0.816	9th–12th place

Date	Time		Score		Set 1	Set 2	Set 3	Set 4	Set 5	Total
01 Jun	09:00	Garuda Indonesia	3–1	(Qatar) Al-Arabi	25–21	25–23	13–25	25–22		88–91
01 Jun	11:00	Suntory Sunbirds (Japan)	3–1	(Thailand) Sang Som	25–14	23–25	25–18	25–20		98–77
01 Jun	17:00	Al-Najma (Bahrain)	3–0	(Uzbekistan) AGMK	25–21	25–20	25–14			75–55
02 Jun	11:00	Garuda Indonesia	3–2	(Japan) Suntory Sunbirds	25–21	25–23	16–25	23–25	15–13	104–107
02 Jun	15:00	Al-Arabi (Qatar)	3–0	(Uzbekistan) AGMK	25–20	25–23	25–16			75–59
02 Jun	19:00	Sang Som (Thailand)	0–3	(Bahrain) Al-Najma	10–25	17–25	11–25			38–75
03 Jun	11:00	AGMK (Uzbekistan)	1–3	(Thailand) Sang Som	25–19	25–27	22–25	15–25		87–96
03 Jun	13:00	Suntory Sunbirds (Japan)	0–3	(Qatar) Al-Arabi	16–25	20–25	20–25			56–75
03 Jun	19:00	Al-Najma (Bahrain)	3–2	Garuda Indonesia	22–25	19–25	25–19	25–12	15–11	106–92
04 Jun	11:00	AGMK (Uzbekistan)	0–3	(Japan) Suntory Sunbirds	22–25	22–25	19–25			63–75
04 Jun	15:00	Sang Som (Thailand)	1–3	Garuda Indonesia	29–31	20–25	26–24	24–26		99–106
04 Jun	19:00	Al-Arabi (Qatar)	3–2	(Bahrain) Al-Najma	21–25	25–23	23–25	25–23	15–7	109–103
05 Jun	09:00	AGMK (Uzbekistan)	0–3	Garuda Indonesia	17–25	19–25	23–25			59–75
05 Jun	11:00	Al-Arabi (Qatar)	3–0	(Thailand) Sang Som	25–20	25–14	25–17			75–51
05 Jun	19:00	Suntory Sunbirds (Japan)	0–3	(Bahrain) Al-Najma	23–25	23–25	19–25			65–75

=== Pool B ===
Pos	Team	Pld	W	L	Pts	SW	SL	SR	SPW	SPL	SPR	Qualification
1	(Iran) Paykan Tehran	5	5	0	10	15	2	7.500	426	337	1.264	Semifinals
2	(Saudi Arabia) Al-Hilal	5	4	1	9	13	6	2.167	463	404	1.146	Semifinals
3	(China) Shanghai Oriental	5	3	2	8	9	6	1.500	357	342	1.044	5th–8th place
4	(United Arab Emirates) Al-Ahli	5	2	3	7	7	11	0.636	368	415	0.887	5th–8th place
5	(Kazakhstan) Rahat CSKA	5	1	4	6	6	12	0.500	385	428	0.900	9th–12th place
6	(Myanmar) Asia World	5	0	5	5	2	15	0.133	341	414	0.824	9th–12th place

Date	Time		Score		Set 1	Set 2	Set 3	Set 4	Set 5	Total
01 Jun	09:00	Al-Hilal (Saudi Arabia)	3–1	(United Arab Emirates) Al-Ahli	25–21	22–25	25–13	25–22		97–81
01 Jun	11:00	Asia World (Myanmar)	0–3	(China) Shanghai Oriental	21–25	19–25	24–26			64–76
01 Jun	15:00	Paykan Tehran (Iran)	3–1	(Kazakhstan) Rahat CSKA	22–25	25–16	25–16	25–21		97–78
02 Jun	09:00	Asia World (Myanmar)	0–3	(Iran) Paykan Tehran	19–25	20–25	16–25			55–75
02 Jun	13:00	Shanghai Oriental (China)	3–0	(United Arab Emirates) Al-Ahli	25–20	25–14	25–14			75–48
02 Jun	17:00	Rahat CSKA (Kazakhstan)	1–3	(Saudi Arabia) Al-Hilal	21–25	25–22	13–25	22–25		81–97
03 Jun	09:00	Al-Hilal (Saudi Arabia)	3–1	(Myanmar) Asia World	25–20	23–25	25–17	25–22		98–84
03 Jun	15:00	Al-Ahli (United Arab Emirates)	3–1	(Kazakhstan) Rahat CSKA	25–21	18–25	25–17	25–23		93–86
03 Jun	17:00	Paykan Tehran (Iran)	3–0	(China) Shanghai Oriental	25–19	25–13	26–24			76–56
04 Jun	09:00	Asia World (Myanmar)	1–3	(United Arab Emirates) Al-Ahli	22–25	25–15	16–25	19–25		82–90
04 Jun	13:00	Paykan Tehran (Iran)	3–1	(Saudi Arabia) Al-Hilal	25–23	28–30	25–21	25–18		103–92
04 Jun	17:00	Shanghai Oriental (China)	3–0	(Kazakhstan) Rahat CSKA	31–29	25–19	29–27			85–75
05 Jun	13:00	Rahat CSKA (Kazakhstan)	3–0	(Myanmar) Asia World	25–22	25–18	25–16			75–56
05 Jun	15:00	Al-Hilal (Saudi Arabia)	3–0	(China) Shanghai Oriental	29–27	25–19	25–19			79–65
05 Jun	17:00	Al-Ahli (United Arab Emirates)	0–3	(Iran) Paykan Tehran	15–25	18–25	23–25			56–75

== Classification 9th–12th ==
9th–12th places
7 June – Manama
(Kazakhstan) Rahat	3
(Uzbekistan) AGMK	0
7 June – Manama
(Thailand) Sang Som	0
(Myanmar) Asia World	3

9th place
8 June – Manama
(Kazakhstan) Rahat	3
(Myanmar) Asia World	1
11th place
8 June – Manama
(Uzbekistan) AGMK	3
(Thailand) Sang Som	2

=== Semifinals ===
Date	Time		Score		Set 1	Set 2	Set 3	Set 4	Set 5	Total
07 Jun	09:00	Rahat CSKA (Kazakhstan)	3–0	(Uzbekistan) AGMK	28–26	25–15	25–14			78–55
07 Jun	11:00	Sang Som (Thailand)	0–3	(Myanmar) Asia World	17–25	13–25	17–25			47–75

=== 11th place ===
Date	Time		Score		Set 1	Set 2	Set 3	Set 4	Set 5	Total
08 Jun	10:00	AGMK (Uzbekistan)	3–2	(Thailand) Sang Som	25–27	25–23	19–25	25–13	15–5	109–93

=== 9th place ===
Date	Time		Score		Set 1	Set 2	Set 3	Set 4	Set 5	Total
08 Jun	12:00	Rahat CSKA (Kazakhstan)	3–1	(Myanmar) Asia World	25–16	23–25	25–10	25–17		98–68

== Classification 5th–8th ==
5th–8th places
7 June – Manama
(China) Shanghai	1
(Japan) Suntory	3
7 June – Manama
(Indonesia) Garuda	3
(United Arab Emirates) Al-Ahli	2

5th place
8 June – Manama
(Japan) Suntory	3
(Indonesia) Garuda	1
7th place
8 June – Manama
(China) Shanghai	3
(United Arab Emirates) Al-Ahli	0

=== Semifinals ===
Date	Time		Score		Set 1	Set 2	Set 3	Set 4	Set 5	Total
07 Jun	13:00	Shanghai Oriental (China)	1–3	(Japan) Suntory Sunbirds	36–34	21–25	12–25	16–25		85–109
07 Jun	15:00	Garuda Indonesia	3–2	(United Arab Emirates) Al-Ahli	22–25	25–19	18–25	25–20	15–11	105–100

=== 7th place ===
Date	Time		Score		Set 1	Set 2	Set 3	Set 4	Set 5	Total
08 Jun	10:00	Shanghai Oriental (China)	3–0	(United Arab Emirates) Al-Ahli	25–20	25–21	25–19			75–60

=== 5th place ===
Date	Time		Score		Set 1	Set 2	Set 3	Set 4	Set 5	Total
08 Jun	12:00	Suntory Sunbirds (Japan)	3–1	Garuda Indonesia	19–25	25–21	25–20	25–19		94–85

== Final round ==
Semifinals
7 June – Manama
(Iran) Paykan	3
(Qatar) Al-Arabi	0
7 June – Manama
(Bahrain) Al-Najma	1
(Saudi Arabia) Al-Hilal	3

Final
8 June – Manama
(Iran) Paykan	3
(Saudi Arabia) Al-Hilal	0
3rd place
8 June – Manama
(Qatar) Al-Arabi	3
(Bahrain) Al-Najma	1

=== Semifinals ===
Date	Time		Score		Set 1	Set 2	Set 3	Set 4	Set 5	Total
07 Jun	17:00	Paykan Tehran (Iran)	3–0	(Qatar) Al-Arabi	25–22	25–14	25–22			75–58
07 Jun	19:00	Al-Najma (Bahrain)	1–3	(Saudi Arabia) Al-Hilal	23–25	25–21	21–25	21–25		90–96

=== 3rd place ===
Date	Time		Score		Set 1	Set 2	Set 3	Set 4	Set 5	Total
08 Jun	16:00	Al-Arabi (Qatar)	3–1	(Bahrain) Al-Najma	19–25	25–20	25–18	28–26		97–89

=== Final ===
Date	Time		Score		Set 1	Set 2	Set 3	Set 4	Set 5	Total
08 Jun	19:00	Paykan Tehran (Iran)	3–0	(Saudi Arabia) Al-Hilal	25–14	25–22	25–17			75–53

== Final standing ==
Rank	Team
1st place, gold medalist(s)	(Iran) Paykan Tehran
2nd place, silver medalist(s)	(Saudi Arabia) Al-Hilal
3rd place, bronze medalist(s)	(Qatar) Al-Arabi
4	(Bahrain) Al-Najma
5	(Japan) Suntory Sunbirds
6	Garuda Indonesia
7	(China) Shanghai Oriental
8	(United Arab Emirates) Al-Ahli
9	(Kazakhstan) Rahat CSKA
10	(Myanmar) Asia World
11	(Uzbekistan) AGMK
12	(Thailand) Sang Som

== Awards ==
- MVP: (Iran) Mohammad Soleimani (Paykan)
- Best scorer: (Iran) Peyman Akbari (Paykan)
- Best server: (Iran) Mohammad Torkashvand (Paykan)
- Best spiker: (Qatar) Jumaa Faraj (Al-Arabi)
- Best blocker: (Iran) Mohammad Mousavi (Paykan)
- Best libero: (Iran) Farhad Zarif (Paykan)
- Best setter: (Saudi Arabia) Khalil Hajji (Al-Hilal)
- Best digger: (Saudi Arabia) Ahmed Al-Bakhit (Al-Hilal)
