= 2001 AVC Cup Men's Club Tournament =

2001 Asian Club Tournament
Tournament details
- Host country: China
- Dates: 24–29 June
- Teams: 7
- Venue: 1 (in 1 host city)

Final positions
- Champions: (South Korea) Samsung Fire (2nd title)

Tournament awards
- MVP: (South Korea) Shin Jin-sik

The 2001 AVC Cup Men's Club Tournament was the 3rd staging of the AVC Club Championships. The tournament was held in Shehong, China. Samsung Fire & Marine Insurance of Korea won the tournament after beating Suntory Sunbirds of Japan.

== Preliminary round ==
=== Pool A ===
| Pos | Team | Pld | W | L | Pts | SW | SL | SR | SPW | SPL | SPR | Qualification |
|---|---|---|---|---|---|---|---|---|---|---|---|---|
| 1 | (Japan) Suntory Sunbirds | 2 | 2 | 0 | 4 | 6 | 1 | 6.000 | 183 | 151 | 1.212 | Semifinals |
| 2 | (China) Shanghai Cable TV | 2 | 1 | 1 | 3 | 4 | 4 | 1.000 | 179 | 190 | 0.942 | Semifinals |
| 3 | (Kazakhstan) CSKA | 2 | 0 | 2 | 2 | 1 | 6 | 0.167 | 153 | 174 | 0.879 | |

| Date | | Score | | Set 1 | Set 2 | Set 3 | Set 4 | Set 5 | Total |
|---|---|---|---|---|---|---|---|---|---|
| 24 Jun | Shanghai Cable TV (China) | 3–1 | (Kazakhstan) CSKA | 26–24 | 25–19 | 20–25 | 25–17 | | 96–85 |
| 25 Jun | Suntory Sunbirds (Japan) | 3–1 | (China) Shanghai Cable TV | 25–19 | 30–32 | 25–17 | 25–15 | | 105–83 |
| 26 Jun | CSKA (Kazakhstan) | 0–3 | (Japan) Suntory Sunbirds | 26–28 | 22–25 | 20–25 | | | 68–78 |

=== Pool B ===
| Pos | Team | Pld | W | L | Pts | SW | SL | SR | SPW | SPL | SPR | Qualification |
|---|---|---|---|---|---|---|---|---|---|---|---|---|
| 1 | (South Korea) Samsung Fire & Marine Insurance | 3 | 3 | 0 | 6 | 9 | 0 | MAX | 227 | 160 | 1.419 | Semifinals |
| 2 | (China) Sichuan Fulan | 3 | 2 | 1 | 5 | 6 | 6 | 1.000 | 257 | 261 | 0.985 | Semifinals |
| 3 | (Iran) Sanam Tehran | 3 | 1 | 2 | 4 | 5 | 7 | 0.714 | 252 | 240 | 1.050 | |
| 4 | (Qatar) Al-Rayyan | 3 | 0 | 3 | 3 | 2 | 9 | 0.222 | 192 | 267 | 0.719 | |

| Date | | Score | | Set 1 | Set 2 | Set 3 | Set 4 | Set 5 | Total |
|---|---|---|---|---|---|---|---|---|---|
| 24 Jun | Samsung Fire & Marine Insurance (South Korea) | 3–0 | (Qatar) Al-Rayyan | 25–20 | 25–11 | 25–17 | | | 75–48 |
| 24 Jun | Sichuan Fulan (China) | 3–2 | (Iran) Sanam Tehran | 25–23 | 19–25 | 25–22 | 19–25 | 15–7 | 103–102 |
| 25 Jun | Sanam Tehran (Iran) | 0–3 | (South Korea) Samsung Fire & Marine Insurance | 20–25 | 19–25 | 17–25 | | | 56–75 |
| 25 Jun | Al-Rayyan (Qatar) | 1–3 | (China) Sichuan Fulan | 12–25 | 25–22 | 24–26 | 21–25 | | 82–98 |
| 26 Jun | Sanam Tehran (Iran) | 3–1 | (Qatar) Al-Rayyan | 19–25 | 25–17 | 25–10 | 25–10 | | 94–62 |
| 26 Jun | Samsung Fire & Marine Insurance (South Korea) | 3–0 | (China) Sichuan Fulan | 25–17 | 27–25 | 25–14 | | | 77–56 |

== Classification 5th–7th ==
5th–7th places
28 June – Shehong
(Kazakhstan) CSKA | 3
(Qatar) Al-Rayyan | 1
28 June – Shehong
(Iran) Sanam
Bye

5th place
29 June – Shehong
(Kazakhstan) CSKA | 1
(Iran) Sanam | 3

=== Semifinals ===
| Date | | Score | | Set 1 | Set 2 | Set 3 | Set 4 | Set 5 | Total |
|---|---|---|---|---|---|---|---|---|---|
| 28 Jun | CSKA (Kazakhstan) | 3–1 | (Qatar) Al-Rayyan | 20–25 | 25–21 | 25–19 | 25–16 | | 95–81 |

=== 5th place ===
| Date | | Score | | Set 1 | Set 2 | Set 3 | Set 4 | Set 5 | Total |
|---|---|---|---|---|---|---|---|---|---|
| 29 Jun | CSKA (Kazakhstan) | 1–3 | (Iran) Sanam Tehran | 28–26 | 23–25 | 22–25 | 22–25 | | 95–101 |

== Final round ==
Semifinals
28 June – Shehong
(Japan) Suntory | 3
(China) Sichuan | 1
28 June – Shehong
(South Korea) Samsung | 3
(China) Shanghai | 0

Final
29 June – Shehong
(Japan) Suntory | 0
(South Korea) Samsung | 3
3rd place
29 June – Shehong
(China) Sichuan | 1
(China) Shanghai | 3

=== Semifinals ===
| Date | | Score | | Set 1 | Set 2 | Set 3 | Set 4 | Set 5 | Total |
|---|---|---|---|---|---|---|---|---|---|
| 28 Jun | Suntory Sunbirds (Japan) | 3–1 | (China) Sichuan Fulan | 25–23 | 25–19 | 27–29 | 25–19 | | 102–90 |
| 28 Jun | Samsung Fire & Marine Insurance (South Korea) | 3–0 | (China) Shanghai Cable TV | 25–21 | 25–22 | 25–21 | | | 75–64 |

=== 3rd place ===
| Date | | Score | | Set 1 | Set 2 | Set 3 | Set 4 | Set 5 | Total |
|---|---|---|---|---|---|---|---|---|---|
| 29 Jun | Sichuan Fulan (China) | 1–3 | (China) Shanghai Cable TV | 25–23 | 21–25 | 16–25 | 26–28 | | 88–101 |

=== Final ===
| Date | | Score | | Set 1 | Set 2 | Set 3 | Set 4 | Set 5 | Total |
|---|---|---|---|---|---|---|---|---|---|
| 29 Jun | Suntory Sunbirds (Japan) | 0–3 | (South Korea) Samsung Fire & Marine Insurance | 20–25 | 15–25 | 19–25 | | | 54–75 |

== Final standing ==
| Rank | Team |
|---|---|
| 1st place, gold medalist(s) | (South Korea) Samsung Fire & Marine Insurance |
| 2nd place, silver medalist(s) | (Japan) Suntory Sunbirds |
| 3rd place, bronze medalist(s) | (China) Shanghai Cable TV |
| 4 | (China) Sichuan Fulan |
| 5 | (Iran) Sanam Tehran |
| 6 | (Kazakhstan) CSKA |
| 7 | (Qatar) Al-Rayyan |

== Awards ==
- MVP: (South Korea) Shin Jin-sik (Samsung)
- Best scorer: (China) Zhao Zhiang (Sichuan)
- Best spiker: (China) Zhao Zhiang (Sichuan)
- Best blocker: (China) Ding Jun (Shanghai)
- Best server: (Iran) Behnam Mahmoudi (Sanam)
- Best libero: (Japan) Katsutoshi Tsumagari (Suntory)
- Best setter: (South Korea) Choi Tae-woong (Samsung)
- Best Digger: (Japan) Katsutoshi Tsumagari (Suntory)
