= 2013 Asian Men's Club Volleyball Championship =

2013 Asian Club Championship

Tournament details
- Host country: Iran
- Dates: 21–29 April
- Teams: 13
- Venues: 2 (in 1 host city)

Final positions
- Champions: (Iran) Kalleh Mazandaran (1st title)

Tournament awards
- MVP: (Iran) Hamzeh Zarini

The 2013 Asian Men's Club Volleyball Championship was the 14th staging of the AVC Club Championships. The tournament was held in Azadi Indoor Stadium, Tehran, Iran.

== Pools composition ==
The teams are seeded based on their final ranking at the 2012 Asian Men's Club Volleyball Championship.

Pool A	Pool B	Pool C	Pool D
Iran (Host & 3rd); ~~Kuwait (14th)~~ * United Arab Emirates; Chinese Taipei	Qatar (1st); Uzbekistan (13th); Iraq	China (2nd); India (8th); Lebanon	Kazakhstan (4th); Japan (7th); Oman; Maldives

* Withdrew

== Preliminary round ==
=== Pool A ===
Pos	Team	Pld	W	L	Pts	SW	SL	SR	SPW	SPL	SPR	Qualification
1	(Iran) Kalleh Mazandaran	2	2	0	6	6	0	MAX	157	120	1.308	Pool E
2	(Chinese Taipei) Taiwan Power Company	2	1	1	3	3	4	0.750	169	172	0.983	Pool E
3	(United Arab Emirates) Al-Ain	2	0	2	0	1	6	0.167	141	175	0.806	Pool G

Date	Time		Score		Set 1	Set 2	Set 3	Set 4	Set 5	Total	Report
21 Apr	17:00	Taiwan Power Company (Chinese Taipei)	0–3	(Iran) Kalleh Mazandaran	30–32	22–25	17–25			69–82	Report
22 Apr	17:00	Al-Ain (United Arab Emirates)	0–3	(Iran) Kalleh Mazandaran	16–25	16–25	19–25			51–75	Report
23 Apr	09:00	Taiwan Power Company (Chinese Taipei)	3–1	(United Arab Emirates) Al-Ain	25–27	25–21	25–19	25–23		100–90	Report

=== Pool B ===
Pos	Team	Pld	W	L	Pts	SW	SL	SR	SPW	SPL	SPR	Qualification
1	(Qatar) Al-Rayyan	2	2	0	5	6	2	3.000	182	152	1.197	Pool F
2	(Iraq) Gas Al-Janoob	2	1	1	4	5	4	1.250	194	178	1.090	Pool F
3	(Uzbekistan) Uzbektelecom	2	0	2	0	1	6	0.167	126	172	0.733	Pool H

Date	Time		Score		Set 1	Set 2	Set 3	Set 4	Set 5	Total	Report
21 Apr	11:00	Uzbektelecom (Uzbekistan)	1–3	(Iraq) Gas Al-Janoob	25–21	16–25	16–25	15–25		72–96	Report
22 Apr	09:00	Al-Rayyan (Qatar)	3–0	(Uzbekistan) Uzbektelecom	25–12	26–24	25–18			76–54	Report
23 Apr	11:00	Gas Al-Janoob (Iraq)	2–3	(Qatar) Al-Rayyan	25–23	25–18	22–25	18–25	8–15	98–106	Report

=== Pool C ===
Pos	Team	Pld	W	L	Pts	SW	SL	SR	SPW	SPL	SPR	Qualification
1	(China) Liaoning	2	2	0	6	6	1	6.000	173	131	1.321	Pool E
2	(India) ONGC Dehradun	2	1	1	3	4	4	1.000	188	195	0.964	Pool E
3	(Lebanon) Jeunesse Bauchrieh	2	0	2	0	1	6	0.167	145	180	0.806	Pool G

Date	Time		Score		Set 1	Set 2	Set 3	Set 4	Set 5	Total	Report
21 Apr	09:00	Jeunesse Bauchrieh (Lebanon)	1–3	(India) ONGC Dehradun	20–25	25–22	21–25	31–33		97–105	Report
22 Apr	11:00	Liaoning (China)	3–0	(Lebanon) Jeunesse Bauchrieh	25–15	25–15	25–18			75–48	Report
23 Apr	13:00	ONGC Dehradun (India)	1–3	(China) Liaoning	22–25	25–23	20–25	16–25		83–98	Report

=== Pool D ===
Pos	Team	Pld	W	L	Pts	SW	SL	SR	SPW	SPL	SPR	Qualification
1	(Kazakhstan) Almaty	3	3	0	9	9	1	9.000	248	195	1.272	Pool F
2	(Japan) Toyoda Gosei Trefuerza	3	2	1	5	6	5	1.200	250	221	1.131	Pool F
3	(Oman) Saham	3	1	2	4	6	7	0.857	299	289	1.035	Pool H
4	(Maldives) STO RC	3	0	3	0	1	9	0.111	160	252	0.635	Pool H

Date	Time		Score		Set 1	Set 2	Set 3	Set 4	Set 5	Total	Report
21 Apr	13:00	Saham (Oman)	1–3	(Kazakhstan) Almaty	22–25	25–23	22–25	19–25		88–98	Report
21 Apr	15:00	STO RC (Maldives)	0–3	(Japan) Toyoda Gosei Trefuerza	10–25	9–25	18–25			37–75	Report
22 Apr	13:00	Almaty (Kazakhstan)	3–0	(Japan) Toyoda Gosei Trefuerza	25–20	25–23	25–20			75–63	Report
22 Apr	15:00	Saham (Oman)	3–1	(Maldives) STO RC	25–17	27–29	25–16	25–17		102–79	Report
23 Apr	15:00	STO RC (Maldives)	0–3	(Kazakhstan) Almaty	11–25	16–25	17–25			44–75	Report
23 Apr	17:00	Toyoda Gosei Trefuerza (Japan)	3–2	(Oman) Saham	25–22	21–25	22–25	29–27	15–10	112–109	Report

== Classification round ==
- The results and the points of the matches between the same teams that were already played during the preliminary round shall be taken into account for the classification round.

=== Pool E ===
Pos	Team	Pld	W	L	Pts	SW	SL	SR	SPW	SPL	SPR	Qualification
1	(Iran) Kalleh Mazandaran	3	3	0	9	9	0	MAX	232	170	1.365	Quarterfinals
2	(Chinese Taipei) Taiwan Power Company	3	2	1	6	6	5	1.200	267	268	0.996	Quarterfinals
3	(China) Liaoning	3	1	2	3	4	7	0.571	246	259	0.950	Quarterfinals
4	(India) ONGC Dehradun	3	0	3	0	2	9	0.222	222	270	0.822	Quarterfinals

Date	Time		Score		Set 1	Set 2	Set 3	Set 4	Set 5	Total	Report
24 Apr	11:00	Liaoning (China)	1–3	(Chinese Taipei) Taiwan Power Company	26–24	24–26	21–25	24–26		95–101	Report
24 Apr	17:00	Kalleh Mazandaran (Iran)	3–0	(India) ONGC Dehradun	25–15	25–14	25–19			75–48	Report
25 Apr	13:00	Taiwan Power Company (Chinese Taipei)	3–1	(India) ONGC Dehradun	19–25	28–26	25–17	25–23		97–91	Report
25 Apr	17:00	Kalleh Mazandaran (Iran)	3–0	(China) Liaoning	25–17	25–17	25–19			75–53	Report

=== Pool F ===
Pos	Team	Pld	W	L	Pts	SW	SL	SR	SPW	SPL	SPR	Qualification
1	(Qatar) Al-Rayyan	3	3	0	8	9	3	3.000	280	241	1.162	Quarterfinals
2	(Kazakhstan) Almaty	3	2	1	5	6	5	1.200	250	243	1.029	Quarterfinals
3	(Japan) Toyoda Gosei Trefuerza	3	1	2	3	4	6	0.667	217	235	0.923	Quarterfinals
4	(Iraq) Gas Al-Janoob	3	0	3	2	4	9	0.444	264	292	0.904	Quarterfinals

Date	Time		Score		Set 1	Set 2	Set 3	Set 4	Set 5	Total	Report
24 Apr	13:00	Al-Rayyan (Qatar)	3–1	(Japan) Toyoda Gosei Trefuerza	25–18	24–26	25–15	25–20		99–79	Report
24 Apr	15:00	Almaty (Kazakhstan)	3–2	(Iraq) Gas Al-Janoob	18–25	25–16	24–26	25–21	19–17	111–105	Report
25 Apr	15:00	Gas Al-Janoob (Iraq)	0–3	(Japan) Toyoda Gosei Trefuerza	21–25	17–25	23–25			61–75	Report
25 Apr	19:00	Al-Rayyan (Qatar)	3–0	(Kazakhstan) Almaty	25–23	25–20	25–21			75–64	Report

=== Pool G ===
Pos	Team	Pld	W	L	Pts	SW	SL	SR	SPW	SPL	SPR	Qualification
1	(United Arab Emirates) Al-Ain	1	1	0	3	3	1	3.000	96	92	1.043	9th–12th place
2	(Lebanon) Jeunesse Bauchrieh	1	0	1	0	1	3	0.333	92	96	0.958	9th–12th place

Date	Time		Score		Set 1	Set 2	Set 3	Set 4	Set 5	Total	Report
25 Apr	09:00	Al-Ain (United Arab Emirates)	3–1	(Lebanon) Jeunesse Bauchrieh	25–23	20–25	26–24	25–20		96–92	Report

=== Pool H ===
Pos	Team	Pld	W	L	Pts	SW	SL	SR	SPW	SPL	SPR	Qualification
1	(Oman) Saham	2	2	0	6	6	2	3.000	197	173	1.139	9th–12th place
2	(Uzbekistan) Uzbektelecom	2	1	1	3	4	3	1.333	169	142	1.190	9th–12th place
3	(Maldives) STO RC	2	0	2	0	1	6	0.167	126	177	0.712	

Date	Time		Score		Set 1	Set 2	Set 3	Set 4	Set 5	Total	Report
24 Apr	09:00	Uzbektelecom (Uzbekistan)	3–0	(Maldives) STO RC	25–19	25–14	25–14			75–47	Report
25 Apr	11:00	Uzbektelecom (Uzbekistan)	1–3	(Oman) Saham	25–27	22–25	25–18	22–25		94–95	Report

== Classification 9th–12th ==
9th–12th places
27 April – Tehran
(United Arab Emirates) Al-Ain	3
(Uzbekistan) Uzbektelecom	0
27 April – Tehran
(Oman) Saham	3
(Lebanon) Bauchrieh	1

9th place
28 April – Tehran
(United Arab Emirates) Al-Ain	2
(Oman) Saham	3
11th place
28 April – Tehran
(Uzbekistan) Uzbektelecom	3
(Lebanon) Bauchrieh	2

=== Semifinals ===
Date	Time		Score		Set 1	Set 2	Set 3	Set 4	Set 5	Total	Report
27 Apr	09:00	Al-Ain (United Arab Emirates)	3–0	(Uzbekistan) Uzbektelecom	25–20	25–13	25–15			75–48	Report
27 Apr	09:00	Saham (Oman)	3–1	(Lebanon) Jeunesse Bauchrieh	25–19	20–25	25–22	26–24		96–90	Report

=== 11th place ===
Date	Time		Score		Set 1	Set 2	Set 3	Set 4	Set 5	Total	Report
28 Apr	09:00	Uzbektelecom (Uzbekistan)	3–2	(Lebanon) Jeunesse Bauchrieh	21–25	25–16	25–17	21–25	19–17	111–100	Report

=== 9th place ===
Date	Time		Score		Set 1	Set 2	Set 3	Set 4	Set 5	Total	Report
28 Apr	09:00	Al-Ain (United Arab Emirates)	2–3	(Oman) Saham	21–25	28–26	22–25	25–23	11–15	107–114	Report

== Final round ==
Quarterfinals
27 April – Tehran
(Iran) Kalleh	3
(Iraq) Gas Al-Janoob	1
27 April – Tehran
(Kazakhstan) Almaty	1
(China) Liaoning	3
27 April – Tehran
(Qatar) Al-Rayyan	3
(India) ONGC	2
27 April – Tehran
(Chinese Taipei) Taiwan Power	3
(Japan) Toyoda	0

Semifinals
28 April – Tehran
(Iran) Kalleh	3
(China) Liaoning	0
28 April – Tehran
(Qatar) Al-Rayyan	3
(Chinese Taipei) Taiwan Power	2

Final
29 April – Tehran
(Iran) Kalleh	3
(Qatar) Al-Rayyan	0
3rd place
29 April – Tehran
(China) Liaoning	0
(Chinese Taipei) Taiwan Power	3

5th–8th places
28 April – Tehran
(Iraq) Gas Al-Janoob	0
(Kazakhstan) Almaty	3
28 April – Tehran
(India) ONGC	2
(Japan) Toyoda	3

5th place
29 April – Tehran
(Kazakhstan) Almaty	3
(Japan) Toyoda	1
7th place
29 April – Tehran
(Iraq) Gas Al-Janoob	3
(India) ONGC	2

=== Quarterfinals ===
Date	Time		Score		Set 1	Set 2	Set 3	Set 4	Set 5	Total	Report
27 Apr	11:00	Taiwan Power Company (Chinese Taipei)	3–0	(Japan) Toyoda Gosei Trefuerza	29–27	25–22	25–22			79–71	Report
27 Apr	13:00	Al-Rayyan (Qatar)	3–2	(India) ONGC Dehradun	23–25	25–16	25–18	21–25	15–13	109–97	Report
27 Apr	17:00	Kalleh Mazandaran (Iran)	3–1	(Iraq) Gas Al-Janoob	25–15	25–18	21–25	25–12		96–70	Report
27 Apr	19:00	Almaty (Kazakhstan)	1–3	(China) Liaoning	21–25	25–23	20–25	26–28		92–101	Report

=== 5th–8th semifinals ===
Date	Time		Score		Set 1	Set 2	Set 3	Set 4	Set 5	Total	Report
28 Apr	11:00	Gas Al-Janoob (Iraq)	0–3	(Kazakhstan) Almaty	19–25	19–25	19–25			57–75	Report
28 Apr	13:00	ONGC Dehradun (India)	2–3	(Japan) Toyoda Gosei Trefuerza	25–19	21–25	19–25	26–24	5–15	96–108	Report

=== Semifinals ===
Date	Time		Score		Set 1	Set 2	Set 3	Set 4	Set 5	Total	Report
28 Apr	17:00	Kalleh Mazandaran (Iran)	3–0	(China) Liaoning	25–12	25–17	25–12			75–41	Report
28 Apr	19:00	Al-Rayyan (Qatar)	3–2	(Chinese Taipei) Taiwan Power Company	25–15	26–28	18–25	25–19	15–13	109–100	Report

=== 7th place ===
Date	Time		Score		Set 1	Set 2	Set 3	Set 4	Set 5	Total	Report
29 Apr	09:00	Gas Al-Janoob (Iraq)	3–2	(India) ONGC Dehradun	25–23	25–27	25–20	22–25	15–8	112–103	

=== 5th place ===
Date	Time		Score		Set 1	Set 2	Set 3	Set 4	Set 5	Total	Report
29 Apr	11:00	Almaty (Kazakhstan)	3–1	(Japan) Toyoda Gosei Trefuerza	25–20	17–25	25–17	25–23		92–85	

=== 3rd place ===
Date	Time		Score		Set 1	Set 2	Set 3	Set 4	Set 5	Total	Report
29 Apr	14:00	Liaoning (China)	0–3	(Chinese Taipei) Taiwan Power Company	22–25	23–25	13–25			58–75	

=== Final ===
Date	Time		Score		Set 1	Set 2	Set 3	Set 4	Set 5	Total	Report
29 Apr	16:30	Kalleh Mazandaran (Iran)	3–0	(Qatar) Al-Rayyan	25–22	25–17	25–21			75–60	

== Final standing ==
Rank	Team
1st place, gold medalist(s)	(Iran) Kalleh Mazandaran
2nd place, silver medalist(s)	(Qatar) Al-Rayyan
3rd place, bronze medalist(s)	(Chinese Taipei) Taiwan Power Company
4	(China) Liaoning
5	(Kazakhstan) Almaty
6	(Japan) Toyoda Gosei Trefuerza
7	(Iraq) Gas Al-Janoob
8	(India) ONGC Dehradun
9	(Oman) Saham
10	(United Arab Emirates) Al-Ain
11	(Uzbekistan) Uzbektelecom
12	(Lebanon) Jeunesse Bauchrieh
13	(Maldives) STO RC

Qualified for the 2013 Club World Championship

== Awards ==
- MVP: (Iran) Hamzeh Zarini (Kalleh)
- Best scorer: (Cuba) Michael Sánchez (Al-Rayyan)
- Best spiker: (Chinese Taipei) Huang Chien-feng (Taiwan Power)
- Best blocker: (Iran) Mohammad Mousavi (Kalleh)
- Best server: (Iran) Farhad Ghaemi (Kalleh)
- Best setter: (Serbia) Vlado Petković (Kalleh)
- Best libero: (China) Kong Fanwei (Liaoning)
