= Behnam Mahmoudi =

Iranian volleyball player (born 1980)

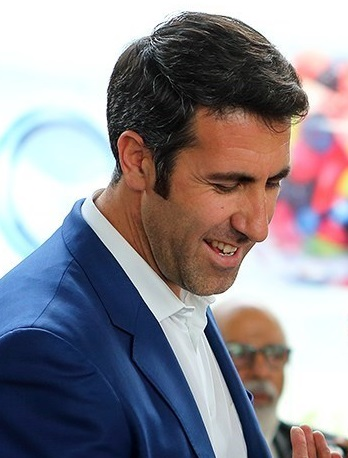

Personal information
- Full name: Behnam Mahmoudi
- Born: April 25, 1980 (age 46); Meyaneh, Iran
- Height: 2.00 m (6 ft 7 in)

Volleyball information
- Position: Opposite

Career
Years	Teams
1996-2000; 2000-2001; 2001; 2001-2002; 2002; 2002; 2002-2003; 2003-2004; 2004-2005; 2005; 2005-2006; 2006; 2007; 2007-2008; 2008-2009	(Iran) Paykan Tehran (Italy) Lupi Santa Croce (Iran) Sanam Tehran (Iran) Paykan Tehran (Italy) Lupi Santa Croce (Iran) Paykan Tehran (Iran) Sanam Tehran (Iran) Pegah Urmia (Iran) Paykan Tehran (Italy) Pallavolo Reima Crema (Iran) Aidaneh Chaldoran (Italy) Perugia Volley (Iran) Pegah Urmia (Iran) Steel Azin Tehran (Iran) Erteashat Sanati

National team
1998–2006	Iran
Honours
Representing Iran
Men's volleyball
Asian Games
Silver medal – second place	2002 Busan	Team
Asian Championship
Bronze medal – third place	2003 Tianjin	Team
Islamic Solidarity Games
Gold medal – first place	2005 Saudi Arabia	Team

Behnam Mahmoudi (Persian: بهنام محمودی, born April 25, 1980, in Meyaneh) is an Iranian former volleyball player, who capped for more than 8 years in the Iran National Volleyball Team of the year 1998–2006. His brother Shahram Mahmoudi is also a successful international player.

Mahmoudi was famous for being the first Iranian volleyball player to ever play professionally outside of his country in a world top league when he signed for Perugia Volley in the first division of Italian Volleyball League, Serie A1. He was vice-chairman of the fourth City Council of Karaj .

== Honours ==
=== National team ===
- Asian Championship
  - Bronze medal (1): 2003
- Asian Games
  - Silver medal (1): 2002

=== Club ===
- AVC Club Championships
  - Gold medal (1): 2002, Paykan
  - Silver medal (2): 2000, 2004, Paykan
  - Bronze medal (1): 1999, Paykan
- Iranian Volleyball Super League
  - Champions (4): 1997, 1998, 1999, 2000, Paykan

=== Individual ===
- MVP: 1999 Asian Championship
- Best Server: 2004 Olympic Qualification Tournament
- Best Scorer: 2000 Asian Club Championship
- Best Server: 2001 Asian Club Championship
- MVP: 2002 Asian Club Championship
