= Amir Hosseini =

Iranian volleyball player

Personal information
- Full name: Amir Hosseini
- Born: July 23, 1975 (age 51); Mashhad, Iran
- Height: 1.83 m (6 ft 0 in)
- Weight: 78 kg (172 lb)
- Spike: 275 cm (108 in)
- Block: 270 cm (106 in)

Volleyball information
- Position: Setter
- Current club: Paykan
- Number: 3

Career
Teams
| | Basij; Sanam; Paykan |

National team
| 1994–2012 | Iran |
Honours
Representing Iran
Men's volleyball
Asian Championship
| Gold medal – first place | 2011 Tehran | Team |
| Bronze medal – third place | 2003 Tianjin | Team |
Asian Games
| Silver medal – second place | 2002 Busan | Team |

Amir Hosseini (Persian: امیر حسینی, born 23 July 1975 in Mashhad) is a retired Iranian volleyball player who former played as a setter for the Iranian national team of the year 2002–2012.

== Honours ==
=== National team ===
- Asian Championship
  - Gold medal (1): 2011
  - Bronze medal (1): 2003
- Asian Games
  - Silver medal (1): 2002

=== Club ===
- World Championship
  - Bronze medal (1): 2010 (Paykan)

- Iranian Super League
  - Champions (10)

=== Individual ===
- Best server: 2002 Asian Club Championship
- Best setter: 2004 Asian Club Championship
- Best setter: 2011 Asian Championship
