= 2010 Asian Men's Club Volleyball Championship =

2010 Asian Club Championship

Tournament details
- Host country: China
- Dates: 5–13 June
- Teams: 10
- Venue: 1 (in 1 host city)

Final positions
- Champions: (Iran) Paykan Tehran (6th title)

Tournament awards
- MVP: (Iran) Peyman Akbari

The 2010 Asian Men's Club Volleyball Championship was the 11th staging of the AVC Club Championships. The tournament was held in Zhenjiang Gymnasium, Zhenjiang, China.

== Pools composition ==
The teams were seeded based on their final ranking at the 2009 Asian Men's Club Volleyball Championship.

Pool A	Pool B
China (Host); Japan (5th); Vietnam; Indonesia; Kazakhstan	Iran (1st); Qatar (3rd); Uzbekistan; ~~Bahrain~~ * Thailand; Myanmar

* Withdrew

== Preliminary round ==
=== Pool A ===
Pos	Team	Pld	W	L	Pts	SW	SL	SR	SPW	SPL	SPR	Qualification
1	(China) Shanghai Tang Dynasty	4	4	0	8	12	3	4.000	355	297	1.195	Quarterfinals
2	(Japan) Panasonic Panthers	4	3	1	7	10	4	2.500	348	302	1.152	Quarterfinals
3	(Kazakhstan) Almaty	4	2	2	6	8	7	1.143	328	320	1.025	Quarterfinals
4	(Vietnam) Sports Center 1	4	1	3	5	4	9	0.444	285	314	0.908	Quarterfinals
5	(Indonesia) Jakarta BNI 46	4	0	4	4	1	12	0.083	239	322	0.742	

Date	Time		Score		Set 1	Set 2	Set 3	Set 4	Set 5	Total	Report
05 Jun	16:00	Panasonic Panthers (Japan)	3–0	(Kazakhstan) Almaty	25–21	25–23	25–14			75–58	Report
05 Jun	19:00	Jakarta BNI 46 (Indonesia)	0–3	(China) Shanghai Tang Dynasty	18–25	20–25	19–25			57–75	Report
06 Jun	14:00	Sports Center 1 (Vietnam)	1–3	(Kazakhstan) Almaty	18–25	25–20	22–25	20–25		85–95	Report
06 Jun	19:00	Jakarta BNI 46 (Indonesia)	1–3	(Japan) Panasonic Panthers	15–25	25–22	17–25	13–25		70–97	Report
07 Jun	16:00	Sports Center 1 (Vietnam)	3–0	(Indonesia) Jakarta BNI 46	25–23	25–20	25–16			75–59	Report
07 Jun	19:00	Shanghai Tang Dynasty (China)	3–1	(Japan) Panasonic Panthers	25–22	23–25	25–21	25–23		98–91	Report
08 Jun	12:00	Almaty (Kazakhstan)	3–0	(Indonesia) Jakarta BNI 46	25–14	25–20	25–19			75–53	Report
08 Jun	19:00	Shanghai Tang Dynasty (China)	3–0	(Vietnam) Sports Center 1	25–19	25–15	25–15			75–49	Report
09 Jun	16:00	Panasonic Panthers (Japan)	3–0	(Vietnam) Sports Center 1	29–27	25–20	31–29			85–76	Report
09 Jun	19:00	Almaty (Kazakhstan)	2–3	(China) Shanghai Tang Dynasty	19–25	25–21	25–21	19–25	12–15	100–107	Report

=== Pool B ===
Pos	Team	Pld	W	L	Pts	SW	SL	SR	SPW	SPL	SPR	Qualification
1	(Iran) Paykan Tehran	4	4	0	8	12	1	12.000	326	263	1.240	Quarterfinals
2	(Qatar) Al-Arabi	4	3	1	7	10	5	2.000	351	312	1.125	Quarterfinals
3	(Thailand) Federbrau	4	2	2	6	8	6	1.333	330	297	1.111	Quarterfinals
4	(Myanmar) Asia World	4	1	3	5	3	9	0.333	250	295	0.847	Quarterfinals
5	(Uzbekistan) Uzbektelecom	4	0	4	4	0	12	0.000	210	300	0.700	

Date	Time		Score		Set 1	Set 2	Set 3	Set 4	Set 5	Total	Report
05 Jun	12:00	Paykan Tehran (Iran)	3–0	(Thailand) Federbrau	25–20	25–21	27–25			77–66	Report
05 Jun	14:00	Uzbektelecom (Uzbekistan)	0–3	(Myanmar) Asia World	22–25	23–25	22–25			67–75	Report
06 Jun	12:00	Asia World (Myanmar)	0–3	(Thailand) Federbrau	17–25	18–25	18–25			53–75	Report
06 Jun	16:00	Uzbektelecom (Uzbekistan)	0–3	(Qatar) Al-Arabi	13–25	12–25	15–25			40–75	Report
07 Jun	12:00	Uzbektelecom (Uzbekistan)	0–3	(Iran) Paykan Tehran	21–25	13–25	16–25			50–75	Report
07 Jun	14:00	Al-Arabi (Qatar)	3–0	(Myanmar) Asia World	25–23	25–21	25–18			75–62	Report
08 Jun	14:00	Federbrau (Thailand)	3–0	(Uzbekistan) Uzbektelecom	25–13	25–17	25–23			75–53	Report
08 Jun	16:00	Al-Arabi (Qatar)	1–3	(Iran) Paykan Tehran	25–21	22–25	19–25	21–25		87–96	Report
09 Jun	12:00	Al-Arabi (Qatar)	3–2	(Thailand) Federbrau	33–35	15–25	25–22	25–18	16–14	114–114	Report
09 Jun	14:00	Paykan Tehran (Iran)	3–0	(Myanmar) Asia World	25–12	25–22	28–26			78–60	Report

== Classification 9th–10th ==
Date	Time		Score		Set 1	Set 2	Set 3	Set 4	Set 5	Total	Report
11 Jun	10:00	Jakarta BNI 46 (Indonesia)	3–1	(Uzbekistan) Uzbektelecom	25–27	25–21	25–20	25–18		100–86	Report

== Final round ==
Quarterfinals
11 June – Zhenjiang
(China) Shanghai	3
(Myanmar) Asia World	1
11 June – Zhenjiang
(Qatar) Al-Arabi	3
(Kazakhstan) Almaty	1
11 June – Zhenjiang
(Iran) Paykan	3
(Vietnam) Sports Center 1	0
11 June – Zhenjiang
(Japan) Panasonic	3
(Thailand) Federbrau	1

Semifinals
12 June – Zhenjiang
(China) Shanghai	1
(Qatar) Al-Arabi	3
12 June – Zhenjiang
(Iran) Paykan	3
(Japan) Panasonic	0

Final
13 June – Zhenjiang
(Qatar) Al-Arabi	1
(Iran) Paykan	3
3rd place
13 June – Zhenjiang
(China) Shanghai	0
(Japan) Panasonic	3

5th–8th places
12 June – Zhenjiang
(Myanmar) Asia World	0
(Kazakhstan) Almaty	3
12 June – Zhenjiang
(Vietnam) Sports Center 1	0
(Thailand) Federbrau	3

5th place
13 June – Zhenjiang
(Kazakhstan) Almaty	3
(Thailand) Federbrau	1
7th place
13 June – Zhenjiang
(Myanmar) Asia World	0
(Vietnam) Sports Center 1	3

=== Quarterfinals ===
Date	Time		Score		Set 1	Set 2	Set 3	Set 4	Set 5	Total	Report
11 Jun	12:00	Shanghai Tang Dynasty (China)	3–1	(Myanmar) Asia World	25–19	25–23	18–25	25–23		93–90	Report
11 Jun	14:00	Paykan Tehran (Iran)	3–0	(Vietnam) Sports Center 1	25–13	25–20	25–19			75–52	Report
11 Jun	16:00	Panasonic Panthers (Japan)	3–1	(Thailand) Federbrau	25–17	20–25	25–22	25–22		95–86	Report
11 Jun	19:00	Al-Arabi (Qatar)	3–1	(Kazakhstan) Almaty	25–19	23–25	25–23	25–17		98–84	Report

=== 5th–8th semifinals ===
Date	Time		Score		Set 1	Set 2	Set 3	Set 4	Set 5	Total	Report
12 Jun	12:30	Asia World (Myanmar)	0–3	(Kazakhstan) Almaty	22–25	23–25	23–25			68–75	Report
12 Jun	14:30	Sports Center 1 (Vietnam)	0–3	(Thailand) Federbrau	21–25	19–25	23–25			63–75	Report

=== Semifinals ===
Date	Time		Score		Set 1	Set 2	Set 3	Set 4	Set 5	Total	Report
12 Jun	16:30	Shanghai Tang Dynasty (China)	1–3	(Qatar) Al-Arabi	22–25	25–15	19–25	12–25		78–90	Report
12 Jun	19:30	Paykan Tehran (Iran)	3–0	(Japan) Panasonic Panthers	25–17	25–18	25–20			75–55	Report

=== 7th place ===
Date	Time		Score		Set 1	Set 2	Set 3	Set 4	Set 5	Total	Report
13 Jun	08:30	Asia World (Myanmar)	0–3	(Vietnam) Sports Center 1	21–25	13–25	25–27			59–77	Report

=== 5th place ===
Date	Time		Score		Set 1	Set 2	Set 3	Set 4	Set 5	Total	Report
13 Jun	10:30	Almaty (Kazakhstan)	3–1	(Thailand) Federbrau	25–17	25–19	18–25	25–17		93–78	Report

=== 3rd place ===
Date	Time		Score		Set 1	Set 2	Set 3	Set 4	Set 5	Total	Report
13 Jun	12:30	Shanghai Tang Dynasty (China)	0–3	(Japan) Panasonic Panthers	25–27	20–25	19–25			64–77	Report

=== Final ===
Date	Time		Score		Set 1	Set 2	Set 3	Set 4	Set 5	Total	Report
13 Jun	14:30	Al-Arabi (Qatar)	1–3	(Iran) Paykan Tehran	24–26	22–25	25–22	19–25		90–98	Report

== Final standing ==
Rank	Team
1st place, gold medalist(s)	(Iran) Paykan Tehran
2nd place, silver medalist(s)	(Qatar) Al-Arabi
3rd place, bronze medalist(s)	(Japan) Panasonic Panthers
4	(China) Shanghai Tang Dynasty
5	(Kazakhstan) Almaty
6	(Thailand) Federbrau
7	(Vietnam) Sports Center 1
8	(Myanmar) Asia World
9	(Indonesia) Jakarta BNI 46
10	(Uzbekistan) Uzbektelecom

Qualified for the 2010 Club World Championship

== Awards ==
- MVP: (Iran) Peyman Akbari (Paykan)
- Best scorer: (Germany) Christian Pampel (Al-Arabi)
- Best spiker: (Japan) Tatsuya Fukuzawa (Panasonic)
- Best blocker: (Qatar) Ibrahim Mohammed (Al-Arabi)
- Best server: (Cuba) Salvador Hidalgo (Al-Arabi)
- Best setter: (Qatar) Saeed Juma Al-Hitmi (Al-Arabi)
- Best libero: (Vietnam) Nguyen Xuan Thanh (Sports Center 1)
