= Hossein Maadani =

Iranian volleyball player and coach (1971–2014)

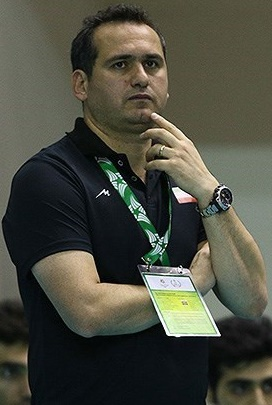

Personal information
- Full name: Hossein Maadani
- Nationality: Iranian
- Born: 7 May 1971; Ardabil, Iran
- Died: 1 August 2014 (aged 43); Tehran, Iran

National team
Iran
Honours
Representing Iran
Men's volleyball as coach
Asian Championship
Silver medal – second place	2009 Manila
AVC Cup
Gold medal – first place	2008 Nakhon Ratchasima
Gold medal – first place	2010 Urmia

Hossein Maadani (Persian: حسین معدنی, 7 May 1971 – 1 August 2014) was an Iranian volleyball player and coach. He was assistant coach and head coach of Iran men's national volleyball team from 2007 to 2014.

== Individual ==
- Best setter: 2002 Asian Club Championship
