= Hamzeh Zarini =

Iranian volleyball player (born 1985)

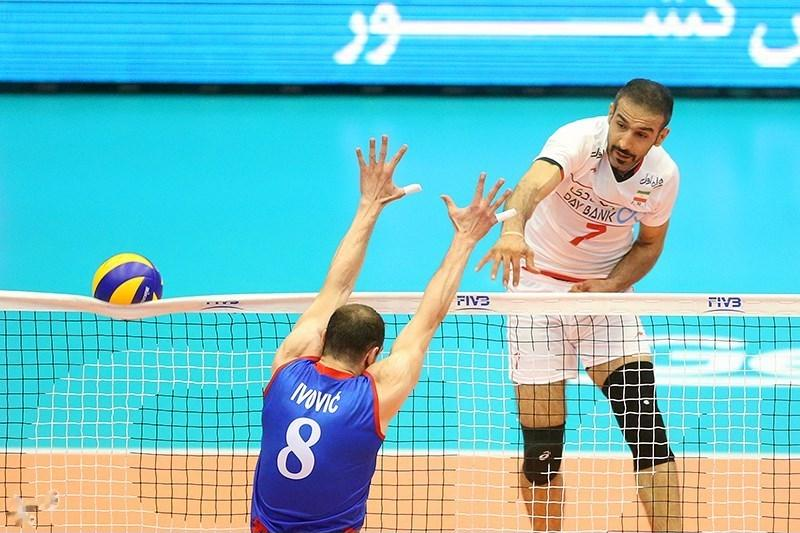

Personal information
- Full name: Hamzeh Zarini
- Born: October 18, 1985 (age 41); Eslamshahr, Iran
- Height: 1.98 m (6 ft 6 in)
- Weight: 91 kg (201 lb)
- Spike: 3.36 m (132 in)
- Block: 3.18 m (125 in)

Volleyball information
- Position: Outside spiker
- Current club: (Iran) Haraz Amol
- Number: 7

Career
| Years | Teams |
|---|---|
| 2004–2005; 2005–2006; 2006–2007; 2007–2008; 2008–2009; 2009–2011; 2011–2014; 2014–2015; 2015–2016; 2017–2018; 2019–2020; 2020–2021; 2021- | Saipa Tehran; Bargh Tehran; Paykan Tehran; Pegah Urmia; Petrochimi Bandar Imam; Damash Gilan; Kalleh Mazandaran; Matin Varamin; Kalleh Mazandaran; Shahrdari Tabriz; Shahrdari Urmia; Haraz Amol; Paykan Tehran |

National team
| 2004–2005; 2005–2016 | Iran U21; Iran |
Honours
Representing Iran
Men's volleyball
Asian Championship
| Gold medal – first place | 2011 Tehran | Team |
| Gold medal – first place | 2013 Dubai | Team |
| Silver medal – second place | 2009 Manila | Team |
| Silver medal – second place | 2015 Tehran | Team |
Asian Games
| Silver medal – second place | 2010 Guangzhou | Team |
Asian Cup
| Gold medal – first place | 2008 Nakhon Ratchasima | Team |
| Gold medal – first place | 2010 Urmia | Team |

Hamzeh Zarini (Persian: حمزه زرینی, born October 18, 1985, in Eslamshahr) is a volleyball player from Iran, who plays as an outside spiker for the national team and Haraz Amol club. He competed at the Rio 2016 Summer Olympics. Zarini two named Most Valuable Player in Asian Club Championship. Zarini in 2005 was invited to Iran national team. He won two gold and a silver team medal at Asian Championship.

== Honours ==
=== National team ===
- Asian Championship
  - Gold medal (2): 2011, 2013
  - Silver medal (2): 2009, 2015
- Asian Games
  - Silver medal (1): 2010
- Asian Cup
  - Gold medal (2): 2008, 2010
- West Asian Games
  - Silver medal (1): 2005
- Asian U20 Championship
  - Silver medal (1): 2004

=== Club ===
- Asian Championship
  - Gold medal (4): 2011 (Paykan), 2013 (Kalleh), 2018 (Khatam),2022 (Paykan)

=== Individual ===
- MVP: 2008 AVC Cup
- Best server: 2010 Asian Games
- Best server: 2011 Asian Club Championship
- MVP: 2011 Asian Club Championship
- MVP: 2013 Asian Club Championship
- Best outside spiker: 2015 Asian Volleyball Championship
- MVP: 2018 Asian Club Championship
