= 2000 AVC Cup men's club tournament =

2000 Asian Club Tournament
Tournament details
- Host country: Thailand
- Dates: 22–26 May
- Teams: 8
- Venue: 1 (in 1 host city)

Final positions
- Champions: (South Korea) Samsung Fire (1st title)

Tournament awards
- MVP: (South Korea) Kim Se-jin

The 2000 Asian Men's Club Volleyball Championship was the 2nd staging of the AVC Club Championships. The tournament was held in Suphanburi, Thailand. Samsung Fire & Marine Insurance of Korea won the tournament after beating Paykan of Tehran, Iran.

== Preliminary round ==
=== Pool A ===
Pos	Team	Pld	W	L	Pts	SW	SL	SR	SPW	SPL	SPR	Qualification
1	(Iran) Paykan Tehran	3	2	1	5	8	4	2.000	0	0	—	Semifinals
2	(Thailand) PTT	3	2	1	5	6	7	0.857	0	0	—	Semifinals
3	(Japan) Suntory Sunbirds	3	1	2	4	5	6	0.833	0	0	—	
4	(Kazakhstan) CSKA	3	1	2	4	4	6	0.667	0	0	—	

Date		Score		Set 1	Set 2	Set 3	Set 4	Set 5	Total
22 May	Suntory Sunbirds (Japan)	0–3	(Iran) Paykan Tehran	23–25	17–25	25–27			65–77
22 May	CSKA (Kazakhstan)	3–0	(Thailand) PTT						
23 May	PTT (Thailand)	3–2	(Japan) Suntory Sunbirds						
23 May	Paykan Tehran (Iran)	3–1	(Kazakhstan) CSKA	23–25	25–20	25–21	25–20		98–86
24 May	Suntory Sunbirds (Japan)	3–0	(Kazakhstan) CSKA						
24 May	PTT (Thailand)	3–2	(Iran) Paykan Tehran						

=== Pool B ===
Pos	Team	Pld	W	L	Pts	SW	SL	SR	SPW	SPL	SPR	Qualification
1	(South Korea) Samsung Fire & Marine Insurance	3	3	0	6	9	0	MAX	0	0	—	Semifinals
2	(China) Jin Han Wang	3	2	1	5	6	5	1.200	0	0	—	Semifinals
3	(Indonesia) DPPK Jakarta	3	1	2	4	5	6	0.833	0	0	—	
4	(Lebanon) Ghazir	3	0	3	3	0	9	0.000	0	0	—	

Date		Score		Set 1	Set 2	Set 3	Set 4	Set 5	Total
22 May	Ghazir (Lebanon)	0–3	(China) Jin Han Wang						
22 May	Samsung Fire & Marine Insurance (South Korea)	3–0	(Indonesia) DPPK Jakarta						
23 May	Jin Han Wang (China)	3–2	(Indonesia) DPPK Jakarta						
23 May	Ghazir (Lebanon)	0–3	(South Korea) Samsung Fire & Marine Insurance						
24 May	Samsung Fire & Marine Insurance (South Korea)	3–0	(China) Jin Han Wang						
24 May	DPPK Jakarta (Indonesia)	3–0	(Lebanon) Ghazir						

== Classification 5th–8th ==
5th–8th places
25 May – Suphanburi
(Japan) Suntory	3
(Lebanon) Ghazir	0
25 May – Suphanburi
(Indonesia) DPPK	0
(Kazakhstan) CSKA	3

5th place
26 May – Suphanburi
(Japan) Suntory	0
(Kazakhstan) CSKA	3
7th place
26 May – Suphanburi
(Lebanon) Ghazir	3
(Indonesia) DPPK	0

=== Semifinals ===
Date		Score		Set 1	Set 2	Set 3	Set 4	Set 5	Total
25 May	Suntory Sunbirds (Japan)	3–0	(Lebanon) Ghazir						
25 May	DPPK Jakarta (Indonesia)	0–3	(Kazakhstan) CSKA						

=== 7th place ===
Date		Score		Set 1	Set 2	Set 3	Set 4	Set 5	Total
26 May	Suntory Sunbirds (Japan)	0–3	(Kazakhstan) CSKA						

=== 5th place ===
Date		Score		Set 1	Set 2	Set 3	Set 4	Set 5	Total
26 May	Suntory Sunbirds (Japan)	0–3	(Kazakhstan) CSKA						

== Final round ==
Semifinals
25 May – Suphanburi
(Iran) Paykan	3
(China) Jin Han Wang	1
25 May – Suphanburi
(South Korea) Samsung	3
(Thailand) PTT	0

Final
26 May – Suphanburi
(Iran) Paykan	1
(South Korea) Samsung	3
3rd place
26 May – Suphanburi
(China) Jin Han Wang	3
(Thailand) PTT	1

=== Semifinals ===
Date		Score		Set 1	Set 2	Set 3	Set 4	Set 5	Total
25 May	Paykan Tehran (Iran)	3–1	(China) Jin Han Wang						
25 May	Samsung Fire & Marine Insurance (South Korea)	3–0	(Thailand) PTT						

=== 3rd place ===
Date		Score		Set 1	Set 2	Set 3	Set 4	Set 5	Total
26 May	Jin Han Wang (China)	3–1	(Thailand) PTT						

=== Final ===
Date		Score		Set 1	Set 2	Set 3	Set 4	Set 5	Total
26 May	Paykan Tehran (Iran)	1–3	(South Korea) Samsung Fire & Marine Insurance	22–25	19–25	25–18	18–25		84–93

== Final standing ==
Rank	Team
1st place, gold medalist(s)	(South Korea) Samsung Fire & Marine Insurance
2nd place, silver medalist(s)	(Iran) Paykan Tehran
3rd place, bronze medalist(s)	(China) Jin Han Wang
4	(Thailand) PTT
5	(Kazakhstan) CSKA
6	(Japan) Suntory Sunbirds
7	(Lebanon) Ghazir
8	(Indonesia) DPPK Jakarta

== Awards ==
- MVP: (South Korea) Kim Se-jin (Samsung)
- Best scorer: (Iran) Behnam Mahmoudi (Paykan)
- Best spiker: (South Korea) Kim Se-jin (Samsung)
- Best blocker: (Iran) Keivan Mojarradi (Paykan)
- Best receiver: (China) Wan Hong (Jin Han Wang)
- Best setter: (South Korea) Bang Ji-sub (Samsung)
