= 2006 Asian Men's Club Volleyball Championship =

2006 Asian Club Championship
Tournament details
- Host country: Vietnam
- Dates: 21–28 May
- Teams: 10
- Venue: 1 (in 1 host city)

Final positions
- Champions: (Iran) Paykan Tehran (2nd title)

Tournament awards
- MVP: (Iran) Mohammad Soleimani

The 2006 Asian Men's Club Volleyball Championship was the 7th staging of the AVC Club Championships. The tournament was held in Hanoi, Vietnam. Paykan of Iran won the tournament after beating Rahat CSKA of Kazakhstan.

== Preliminary round ==
=== Pool A ===
Pos	Team	Pld	W	L	Pts	SW	SL	SR	SPW	SPL	SPR	Qualification
1	(Iran) Paykan Tehran	4	4	0	8	12	0	MAX	304	229	1.328	Semifinals
2	(Thailand) Army	4	3	1	7	9	7	1.286	355	342	1.038	Semifinals
3	(Bahrain) Al-Muharraq	4	2	2	6	7	10	0.700	357	394	0.906	5th–8th place
4	(China) Shanghai Oriental	4	1	3	5	7	9	0.778	359	356	1.008	5th–8th place
5	(Myanmar) Asia World	4	0	4	4	3	12	0.250	300	354	0.847	9th–10th place

Date		Score		Set 1	Set 2	Set 3	Set 4	Set 5	Total
21 May	Paykan Tehran (Iran)	3–0	(Myanmar) Asia World	25–20	25–10	25–17			75–47
21 May	Army (Thailand)	3–2	(China) Shanghai Oriental	19–25	25–21	23–25	29–27	15–11	111–109
22 May	Al-Muharraq (Bahrain)	1–3	(Thailand) Army	25–22	16–25	20–25	21–25		82–97
22 May	Shanghai Oriental (China)	0–3	(Iran) Paykan Tehran	22–25	21–25	26–28			69–78
23 May	Asia World (Myanmar)	0–3	(China) Shanghai Oriental	19–25	18–25	24–26			61–76
23 May	Paykan Tehran (Iran)	3–0	(Bahrain) Al-Muharraq	25–15	26–24	25–17			76–56
24 May	Al-Muharraq (Bahrain)	3–2	(Myanmar) Asia World	27–25	24–26	18–25	26–24	18–16	113–116
24 May	Army (Thailand)	0–3	(Iran) Paykan Tehran	21–25	18–25	18–25			57–75
25 May	Asia World (Myanmar)	1–3	(Thailand) Army	25–15	17–25	20–25	14–25		76–90
25 May	Shanghai Oriental (China)	2–3	(Bahrain) Al-Muharraq	25–23	23–25	21–25	25–18	11–15	105–106

=== Pool B ===
Pos	Team	Pld	W	L	Pts	SW	SL	SR	SPW	SPL	SPR	Qualification
1	(Kazakhstan) Rahat CSKA	4	4	0	8	12	2	6.000	334	255	1.310	Semifinals
2	(Indonesia) Jakarta BNI Taplus	4	3	1	7	9	3	3.000	283	261	1.084	Semifinals
3	(Japan) Osaka Blazers Sakai	4	2	2	6	8	7	1.143	343	318	1.079	5th–8th place
4	(Vietnam) Sport Center 1	4	1	3	5	4	9	0.444	260	305	0.852	5th–8th place
5	(Chinese Taipei) Royal China Express	4	0	4	4	0	12	0.000	223	304	0.734	9th–10th place

Date		Score		Set 1	Set 2	Set 3	Set 4	Set 5	Total
21 May	Sport Center 1 (Vietnam)	0–3	(Indonesia) Jakarta BNI Taplus	20–25	22–25	19–25			61–75
21 May	Rahat CSKA (Kazakhstan)	3–2	(Japan) Osaka Blazers Sakai	18–25	19–25	31–29	25–22	15–9	108–110
22 May	Rahat CSKA (Kazakhstan)	3–0	(Vietnam) Sport Center 1	25–16	25–20	26–24			76–60
22 May	Osaka Blazers Sakai (Japan)	3–0	(Chinese Taipei) Royal China Express	25–18	25–16	25–15			75–49
23 May	Sport Center 1 (Vietnam)	1–3	(Japan) Osaka Blazers Sakai	20–25	17–25	25–21	22–25		84–96
23 May	Royal China Express (Chinese Taipei)	0–3	(Indonesia) Jakarta BNI Taplus	24–26	26–28	23–25			73–79
24 May	Rahat CSKA (Kazakhstan)	3–0	(Chinese Taipei) Royal China Express	25–11	25–14	25–18			75–43
24 May	Osaka Blazers Sakai (Japan)	0–3	(Indonesia) Jakarta BNI Taplus	19–25	18–25	25–27			62–77
25 May	Royal China Express (Chinese Taipei)	0–3	(Vietnam) Sport Center 1	20–25	19–25	19–25			58–75
25 May	Jakarta BNI Taplus (Indonesia)	0–3	(Kazakhstan) Rahat CSKA	19–25	13–25	20–25			52–75

== Classification 9th–10th ==
Date		Score		Set 1	Set 2	Set 3	Set 4	Set 5	Total
27 May	Asia World (Myanmar)	3–0	(Chinese Taipei) Royal China Express	25–17	25–19	25–22			75–58

== Classification 5th–8th ==
5th–8th places
27 May – Hanoi
(Bahrain) Al-Muharraq	2
(Vietnam) Sport Center 1	3
27 May – Hanoi
(Japan) Sakai	0
(China) Shanghai	3

5th place
28 May – Hanoi
(Vietnam) Sport Center 1	0
(China) Shanghai	3
7th place
28 May – Hanoi
(Bahrain) Al-Muharraq	2
(Japan) Sakai	3

=== Semifinals ===
Date		Score		Set 1	Set 2	Set 3	Set 4	Set 5	Total
27 May	Al-Muharraq (Bahrain)	2–3	(Vietnam) Sport Center 1	30–32	19–25	25–15	25–12	11–15	110–99
27 May	Osaka Blazers Sakai (Japan)	0–3	(China) Shanghai Oriental	23–25	28–30	22–25			73–80

=== 7th place ===
Date		Score		Set 1	Set 2	Set 3	Set 4	Set 5	Total
28 May	Al-Muharraq (Bahrain)	2–3	(Japan) Osaka Blazers Sakai	25–23	26–24	19–25	23–25	14–16	107–113

=== 5th place ===
Date		Score		Set 1	Set 2	Set 3	Set 4	Set 5	Total
28 May	Sport Center 1 (Vietnam)	0–3	(China) Shanghai Oriental	20–25	30–32	12–25			62–82

== Final round ==
Semifinals
27 May – Hanoi
(Iran) Paykan	3
(Indonesia) BNI Taplus	0
27 May – Hanoi
(Kazakhstan) Rahat	3
(Thailand) Army	1

Final
28 May – Hanoi
(Iran) Paykan	3
(Kazakhstan) Rahat	1
3rd place
28 May – Hanoi
(Indonesia) BNI Taplus	3
(Thailand) Army	2

=== Semifinals ===
Date		Score		Set 1	Set 2	Set 3	Set 4	Set 5	Total
27 May	Paykan Tehran (Iran)	3–0	(Indonesia) Jakarta BNI Taplus	32–30	25–11	25–17			82–58
27 May	Rahat CSKA (Kazakhstan)	3–1	(Thailand) Army	25–23	24–26	25–21	25–20		99–90

=== 3rd place ===
Date		Score		Set 1	Set 2	Set 3	Set 4	Set 5	Total
28 May	Jakarta BNI Taplus (Indonesia)	3–2	(Thailand) Army	29–27	19–25	27–25	12–25	15–13	102–115

=== Final ===
Date		Score		Set 1	Set 2	Set 3	Set 4	Set 5	Total
28 May	Paykan Tehran (Iran)	3–1	(Kazakhstan) Rahat CSKA	25–22	25–18	26–28	25–22		101–90

== Final standing ==
Rank	Team
1st place, gold medalist(s)	(Iran) Paykan Tehran
2nd place, silver medalist(s)	(Kazakhstan) Rahat CSKA
3rd place, bronze medalist(s)	(Indonesia) Jakarta BNI Taplus
4	(Thailand) Army
5	(China) Shanghai Oriental
6	(Vietnam) Sport Center 1
7	(Japan) Osaka Blazers Sakai
8	(Bahrain) Al-Muharraq
9	(Myanmar) Asia World
10	(Chinese Taipei) Royal China Express

== Awards ==
- MVP: (Iran) Mohammad Soleimani (Paykan)
- Best scorer: (Japan) Daisaku Nishino (Sakai)
- Best server: (Iran) Mohammad Mohammadkazem (Paykan)
- Best spiker: (China) Fang Yingchao (Shanghai)
- Best blocker: (Iran) Mohammad Mansouri (Paykan)
- Best libero: (Iran) Farhad Zarif (Paykan)
- Best setter: (China) He Jiong (Shanghai)
- Best digger: (Thailand) Srophum Supachai (Army)
