= 2010 AVC Cup for Men =

International indoor volleyball tournament

2010 Asian Men's Volleyball Cup

Tournament details
- Host country: Iran
- City: Urmia
- Dates: 1–7 August
- Teams: 8 (from 1 confederation)
- Venue: 1 (in 1 host city)

Final positions
- Champions: Iran (2nd title)
- Runners-up: China
- Third place: India
- Fourth place: Chinese Taipei

Tournament awards
- MVP: (Iran) Farhad Nazari Afshar

The 2010 Asian Men's Volleyball Cup, so-called 2010 AVC Cup for Men was the second edition of the Asian Cup, played by top eight teams of the 2009 Asian Championship. The tournament was held at Ghadir Arena, Urmia, Iran from 1 to 7 August 2010.

== Pools composition ==
The teams are seeded based on their final ranking at the 2009 Asian Men's Volleyball Championship.

Pool A	Pool B
Iran (Host & 2nd); China (4th); Chinese Taipei; ~~Indonesia~~ *	Japan (1st); South Korea (3rd); Australia; Kazakhstan

* Indonesia withdrew and replaced by India.

== Venue ==
All matches
Urmia, Iran
Ghadir Arena
Capacity: 6,000
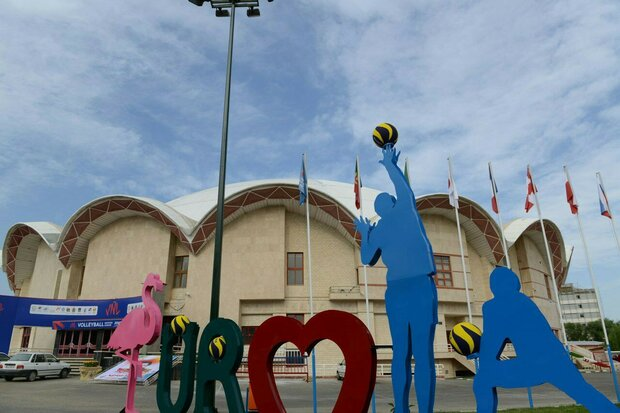

== Preliminary round ==
=== Pool A ===
Pos	Team	Pld	W	L	Pts	SW	SL	SR	SPW	SPL	SPR	Qualification
1	Iran	3	3	0	6	9	4	2.250	302	267	1.131	Quarterfinals
2	China	3	2	1	5	8	4	2.000	278	250	1.112	Quarterfinals
3	India	3	1	2	4	6	7	0.857	283	301	0.940	Quarterfinals
4	Chinese Taipei	3	0	3	3	1	9	0.111	211	256	0.824	Quarterfinals

Date	Time		Score		Set 1	Set 2	Set 3	Set 4	Set 5	Total	Report
01 Aug	13:30	Chinese Taipei	0–3	China	19–25	16–25	14–25			49–75	Report
01 Aug	18:00	Iran	3–2	India	25–15	25–17	23–25	23–25	15–10	111–92	Report
02 Aug	13:30	China	3–1	India	25–22	25–19	21–25	25–20		96–86	Report
02 Aug	18:00	Chinese Taipei	0–3	Iran	23–25	21–25	24–26			68–76	Report
03 Aug	13:30	India	3–1	Chinese Taipei	22–25	33–31	25–18	25–20		105–94	Report
03 Aug	18:00	China	2–3	Iran	26–24	25–22	23–25	16–25	17–19	107–115	Report

=== Pool B ===
Pos	Team	Pld	W	L	Pts	SW	SL	SR	SPW	SPL	SPR	Qualification
1	Australia	3	2	1	5	8	3	2.667	259	232	1.116	Quarterfinals
2	South Korea	3	2	1	5	7	7	1.000	312	298	1.047	Quarterfinals
3	Kazakhstan	3	2	1	5	6	4	1.500	227	231	0.983	Quarterfinals
4	Japan	3	0	3	3	2	9	0.222	228	265	0.860	Quarterfinals

Date	Time		Score		Set 1	Set 2	Set 3	Set 4	Set 5	Total	Report
01 Aug	10:00	Australia	3–0	Kazakhstan	25–15	25–23	25–21			75–59	Report
01 Aug	15:30	South Korea	3–2	Japan	25–18	23–25	25–17	21–25	17–15	111–100	Report
02 Aug	10:00	Japan	0–3	Kazakhstan	27–29	16–25	20–25			63–79	Report
02 Aug	15:30	South Korea	3–2	Australia	23–25	25–23	25–23	20–25	15–13	108–109	Report
03 Aug	10:00	Australia	3–0	Japan	25–21	25–22	25–22			75–65	Report
03 Aug	15:30	Kazakhstan	3–1	South Korea	26–24	25–21	13–25	25–23		89–93	Report

== Final round ==
Quarterfinals
5 August
Iran	3
Japan	0
5 August
South Korea	2
India	3
5 August
Australia	2
Chinese Taipei	3
5 August
China	3
Kazakhstan	1

Semifinals
6 August
Iran	3
India	2
6 August
Chinese Taipei	1
China	3

Final
7 August
Iran	3
China	0
3rd place
7 August
India	3
Chinese Taipei	1

5th–8th places
6 August
Japan	1
South Korea	3
6 August
Australia	3
Kazakhstan	0

5th place
7 August
South Korea	1
Australia	3
7th place
7 August
Japan	1
Kazakhstan	3

=== Quarterfinals ===
Date	Time		Score		Set 1	Set 2	Set 3	Set 4	Set 5	Total	Report
05 Aug	10:00	Australia	2–3	Chinese Taipei	25–23	26–24	22–25	23–25	19–21	115–118	Report
05 Aug	14:00	China	3–1	Kazakhstan	25–19	23–25	25–22	29–27		102–93	Report
05 Aug	16:30	Iran	3–0	Japan	26–24	25–16	25–22			76–62	Report
05 Aug	18:30	South Korea	2–3	India	23–25	25–12	25–20	19–25	11–15	103–97	Report

=== 5th–8th semifinals ===
Date	Time		Score		Set 1	Set 2	Set 3	Set 4	Set 5	Total	Report
06 Aug	10:00	Japan	1–3	South Korea	25–22	17–25	17–25	23–25		82–97	Report
06 Aug	14:00	Australia	3–0	Kazakhstan	25–21	25–15	25–21			75–57	Report

=== Semifinals ===
Date	Time		Score		Set 1	Set 2	Set 3	Set 4	Set 5	Total	Report
06 Aug	16:30	Iran	3–2	India	25–19	22–25	20–25	25–17	15–11	107–97	Report
06 Aug	18:30	Chinese Taipei	1–3	China	25–19	21–25	20–25	27–29		93–98	Report

=== 7th place ===
Date	Time		Score		Set 1	Set 2	Set 3	Set 4	Set 5	Total	Report
07 Aug	10:00	Japan	1–3	Kazakhstan	16–25	15–25	25–15	21–25		77–90	Report

=== 5th place ===
Date	Time		Score		Set 1	Set 2	Set 3	Set 4	Set 5	Total	Report
07 Aug	13:30	South Korea	1–3	Australia	31–29	23–25	19–25	22–25		95–104	Report

=== 3rd place ===
Date	Time		Score		Set 1	Set 2	Set 3	Set 4	Set 5	Total	Report
07 Aug	15:30	India	3–1	Chinese Taipei	22–25	25–20	25–16	27–25		99–86	Report

=== Final ===
Date	Time		Score		Set 1	Set 2	Set 3	Set 4	Set 5	Total	Report
07 Aug	18:00	Iran	3–0	China	25–18	25–18	25–18			75–54	Report

== Final standing ==
Rank	Team
1st place, gold medalist(s)	Iran
2nd place, silver medalist(s)	China
3rd place, bronze medalist(s)	India
4	Chinese Taipei
5	Australia
6	South Korea
7	Kazakhstan
8	Japan

2010 Asian Men's Cup champions

Iran
2nd title

Team Roster
Javad Mohammadinejad, Saeid Marouf, Mohammad Mousavi, Hamzeh Zarini, Alireza Nadi, Mohsen Andalib, Farhad Nazari Afshar, Mehdi Mahdavi, Arash Keshavarzi, Abdolreza Alizadeh, Mohammad Mohammadkazem, Arash Kamalvand
Head Coach: Hossein Maadani

== Awards ==
- MVP: (Iran) Farhad Nazari Afshar
- Best scorer: (India) Sanjay Kumar
- Best spiker: (China) Cui Jianjun
- Best blocker: (Iran) Alireza Nadi
- Best server: (Chinese Taipei) Wang Ming-chun
- Best setter: (Iran) Saeid Marouf
- Best libero: (Iran) Abdolreza Alizadeh
