= 2002 AVC Cup Men's Club Tournament =

2002 Asian Club Tournament
Tournament details
- Host country: Iran
- Dates: 16–20 May
- Teams: 6
- Venue: 1 (in 1 host city)

Final positions
- Champions: (Iran) Paykan Tehran (1st title)

Tournament awards
- MVP: (Iran) Behnam Mahmoudi

The 2002 AVC Cup Men's Club Tournament was the 4th staging of the AVC Club Championships. The tournament was held in Azadi Volleyball Hall, Tehran, Iran. Paykan of Iran won the tournament after beating Sanam.

== Preliminary round ==
=== Pool A ===
Pos	Team	Pld	W	L	Pts	SW	SL	SR	SPW	SPL	SPR	Qualification
1	(Iran) Sanam Tehran	2	2	0	4	6	0	MAX	150	101	1.485	Semifinals
2	(Kazakhstan) Atyrau	2	1	1	3	3	3	1.000	128	136	0.941	Semifinals
3	(Malaysia) Shah Alam	2	0	2	2	0	6	0.000	109	150	0.727	

Date		Score		Set 1	Set 2	Set 3	Set 4	Set 5	Total
16 May	Sanam Tehran (Iran)	3–0	(Kazakhstan) Atyrau	25–18	25–15	25–20			75–53
17 May	Shah Alam (Malaysia)	0–3	(Iran) Sanam Tehran	18–25	14–25	16–25			48–75
18 May	Atyrau (Kazakhstan)	3–0	(Malaysia) Shah Alam	25–19	25–22	25–20			75–61

=== Pool B ===
Pos	Team	Pld	W	L	Pts	SW	SL	SR	SPW	SPL	SPR	Qualification
1	(Iran) Paykan Tehran	2	2	0	4	6	3	2.000	209	179	1.168	Semifinals
2	(Qatar) Al-Rayyan	2	1	1	3	4	5	0.800	191	205	0.932	Semifinals
3	(Japan) Suntory Sunbirds	2	0	2	2	4	6	0.667	209	225	0.929	

Date		Score		Set 1	Set 2	Set 3	Set 4	Set 5	Total
16 May	Paykan Tehran (Iran)	3–2	(Japan) Suntory Sunbirds	24–26	22–25	25–18	25–20	15–13	111–102
17 May	Al-Rayyan (Qatar)	1–3	(Iran) Paykan Tehran	25–23	17–25	19–25	16–25		77–98
18 May	Suntory Sunbirds (Japan)	2–3	(Qatar) Al-Rayyan	25–21	30–28	18–25	21–25	13–15	107–114

== Classification 5th–6th ==
Date		Score		Set 1	Set 2	Set 3	Set 4	Set 5	Total
19 May	Shah Alam (Malaysia)	0–3	(Japan) Suntory Sunbirds	9–25	17–25	20–25			46–75

== Final round ==
Semifinals
19 May – Tehran
(Iran) Sanam	3
(Qatar) Al-Rayyan	0
19 May – Tehran
(Iran) Paykan	3
(Kazakhstan) Atyrau	0

Final
20 May – Tehran
(Iran) Sanam	1
(Iran) Paykan	3
3rd place
20 May – Tehran
(Qatar) Al-Rayyan	1
(Kazakhstan) Atyrau	3

=== Semifinals ===
Date		Score		Set 1	Set 2	Set 3	Set 4	Set 5	Total
19 May	Paykan Tehran (Iran)	3–0	(Kazakhstan) Atyrau	29–27	25–22	25–14			79–63
19 May	Sanam Tehran (Iran)	3–0	(Qatar) Al-Rayyan	25–22	25–19	25–18			75–59

=== 3rd place ===
Date		Score		Set 1	Set 2	Set 3	Set 4	Set 5	Total
20 May	Al-Rayyan (Qatar)	1–3	(Kazakhstan) Atyrau	22–25	25–19	23–25	24–26		94–95

=== Final ===
Date		Score		Set 1	Set 2	Set 3	Set 4	Set 5	Total
20 May	Sanam Tehran (Iran)	1–3	(Iran) Paykan Tehran	23–25	25–22	20–25	14–25		82–97

== Final standing ==
Rank	Team
1st place, gold medalist(s)	(Iran) Paykan Tehran
2nd place, silver medalist(s)	(Iran) Sanam Tehran
3rd place, bronze medalist(s)	(Kazakhstan) Atyrau
4	(Qatar) Al-Rayyan
5	(Japan) Suntory Sunbirds
6	(Malaysia) Shah Alam

== Awards ==
- MVP: (Iran) Behnam Mahmoudi (Paykan)
- Best scorer: (India) Amir Singh (Al-Rayyan)
- Best spiker: (Iran) Mohammad Torkashvand (Sanam)
- Best server: (Iran) Amir Hosseini (Sanam)
- Best blocker: (Kazakhstan) Danil Siminov (Atyrau)
- Best libero: (Japan) Katsutoshi Tsumagari (Suntory)
- Best setter: (Iran) Hossein Maadani (Paykan)
