= 1999 AVC Cup Men's Club Tournament =

1999 Asian Club Tournament
Tournament details
- Host country: China
- Dates: 2–6 June
- Teams: 6
- Venue: 1 (in 1 host city)

Final positions
- Champions: (China) Sichuan Fulan (1st title)

Tournament awards
- MVP: (China) Zhang Xiang

The 1999 Asian Men's Club Volleyball Championship was the first staging of the AVC Club Championships. The tournament was held in Hefei, China. Sichuan Fulan of China won the tournament in round robin format.

== Results ==
Pos	Team	Pld	W	L	Pts	SW	SL	SR	SPW	SPL	SPR
1	(China) Sichuan Fulan	5	5	0	10	15	2	7.500	423	348	1.216
2	(South Korea) Samsung Fire & Marine Insurance	5	4	1	9	13	3	4.333	390	320	1.219
3	(Iran) Paykan Tehran	5	2	3	7	8	9	0.889	374	369	1.014
4	(China) Chengdu Enwei	5	2	3	7	6	9	0.667	330	346	0.954
5	(Japan) NEC Blue Rockets	5	2	3	7	7	11	0.636	395	418	0.945
6	(Qatar) Al-Rayyan	5	0	5	5	0	15	0.000	264	375	0.704

Date		Score		Set 1	Set 2	Set 3	Set 4	Set 5	Total
02 Jun	Samsung Fire & Marine Insurance (South Korea)	3–0	(Iran) Paykan Tehran	25–20	25–17	25–20			75–57
02 Jun	Sichuan Fulan (China)	3–1	(Japan) NEC Blue Rockets	25–22	25–20	23–25	25–21		98–88
02 Jun	Chengdu Enwei (China)	3–0	(Qatar) Al-Rayyan	25–22	25–11	25–18			75–51
03 Jun	Al-Rayyan (Qatar)	0–3	(South Korea) Samsung Fire & Marine Insurance	13–25	21–25	17–25			51–75
03 Jun	Paykan Tehran (Iran)	0–3	(China) Sichuan Fulan	21–25	22–25	13–25			56–75
03 Jun	NEC Blue Rockets (Japan)	0–3	(China) Chengdu Enwei	19–25	21–25	23–25			63–75
04 Jun	Paykan Tehran (Iran)	3–0	(Qatar) Al-Rayyan	25–11	25–14	25–15			75–40
04 Jun	Sichuan Fulan (China)	3–0	(China) Chengdu Enwei	25–20	25–20	25–18			75–58
04 Jun	NEC Blue Rockets (Japan)	0–3	(South Korea) Samsung Fire & Marine Insurance	22–25	18–25	18–25			58–75
05 Jun	Chengdu Enwei (China)	0–3	(Iran) Paykan Tehran	20–25	18–25	30–32			68–82
05 Jun	Al-Rayyan (Qatar)	0–3	(Japan) NEC Blue Rockets	22–25	21–25	23–25			66–75
05 Jun	Samsung Fire & Marine Insurance (South Korea)	1–3	(China) Sichuan Fulan	25–23	21–25	25–27	19–25		90–100
06 Jun	NEC Blue Rockets (Japan)	3–2	(Iran) Paykan Tehran	25–27	21–25	25–18	25–21	15–13	111–104
06 Jun	Sichuan Fulan (China)	3–0	(Qatar) Al-Rayyan	25–15	25–20	25–21			75–56
06 Jun	Chengdu Enwei (China)	0–3	(South Korea) Samsung Fire & Marine Insurance	19–25	14–25	21–25			54–75

== Final standing ==
Rank	Team
1st place, gold medalist(s)	(China) Sichuan Fulan
2nd place, silver medalist(s)	(South Korea) Samsung Fire & Marine Insurance
3rd place, bronze medalist(s)	(Iran) Paykan Tehran
4	(China) Chengdu Enwei
5	(Japan) NEC Blue Rockets
6	(Qatar) Al-Rayyan

== Awards ==
- MVP: (China) Zhang Xiang (Sichuan)
- Best spiker: (South Korea) Shin Jin-sik (Samsung)
- Best blocker: (China) Zhu Gang (Sichuan)
- Best server: (China) Zhang Liming (Sichuan)
- Best receiver: (Iran) Azim Jazideh (Paykan)
- Best setter: (China) Yi Van (Sichuan)
- Best digger: (South Korea) Suk Jin-wook (Samsung)
