= Mohammad Torkashvand =

Iranian volleyball player

Mohammad Torkashvand (Persian: محمد ترکاشوند born 25 January 1979, in Kermanshah) is an Iranian former volleyball player. Torkashvand was one of Iran's volleyball stars.

== Honours ==
- Best spiker: 1998 Asian Junior Championship
- Best spiker: 2002 Asian Club Championship
- MVP: 2004 Asian Club Championship
- Best server: 2007 Asian Club Championship
