= 2005 Asian Men's Club Volleyball Championship =

2005 Asian Club Championship
Tournament details
- Host country: Pakistan
- Dates: 1–8 June
- Teams: 7
- Venue: 1 (in 1 host city)

Final positions
- Champions: (Kazakhstan) Rahat CSKA (1st title)

The 2005 Asian Men's Club Volleyball Championship was the 6th staging of the AVC Club Championships. The tournament was held in Liaqut Gymnasium, Islamabad, Pakistan. Rahat CSKA of Kazakhstan won the tournament in round robin format.

== Results ==
Pos	Team	Pld	W	L	Pts	SW	SL	SR	SPW	SPL	SPR
1	(Kazakhstan) Rahat CSKA	6	5	1	11	17	4	4.250	498	389	1.280
2	(Iran) Saipa Tehran	6	5	1	11	15	5	3.000	485	407	1.192
3	(China) Shanghai Oriental	6	4	2	10	14	8	1.750	502	454	1.106
4	(Pakistan) Habib Bank Limited	6	4	2	10	13	9	1.444	505	462	1.093
5	(Thailand) Sang Som	6	1	5	7	5	15	0.333	426	475	0.897
6	(Uzbekistan) Uzi Samarkand	6	1	5	7	5	16	0.313	398	507	0.785
7	(India) HSIDC	6	1	5	7	5	17	0.294	394	514	0.767

Date	Time		Score		Set 1	Set 2	Set 3	Set 4	Set 5	Total
01 Jun	14:00	Saipa Tehran (Iran)	3–1	(China) Shanghai Oriental	23–25	26–24	25–19	25–21		99–89
01 Jun	16:35	Uzi Samarkand (Uzbekistan)	0–3	(Pakistan) Habib Bank Limited	18–25	20–25	18–25			56–75
02 Jun	12:00	Sang Som (Thailand)	1–3	(Uzbekistan) Uzi Samarkand	25–20	23–25	25–27	24–26		97–98
02 Jun	14:00	Rahat CSKA (Kazakhstan)	3–0	(India) HSIDC	25–14	25–17	25–14			75–45
02 Jun	16:00	Habib Bank Limited (Pakistan)	0–3	(Iran) Saipa Tehran	22–25	21–25	24–26			67–76
03 Jun	12:00	Uzi Samarkand (Uzbekistan)	0–3	(Kazakhstan) Rahat CSKA	16–25	14–25	22–25			52–75
03 Jun	14:00	Saipa Tehran (Iran)	3–1	(Thailand) Sang Som	23–25	25–19	25–18	25–18		98–80
03 Jun	16:00	Shanghai Oriental (China)	1–3	(Pakistan) Habib Bank Limited	28–26	17–25	16–25	20–25		81–101
04 Jun	12:00	HSIDC (India)	3–2	(Uzbekistan) Uzi Samarkand	25–21	22–25	25–16	23–25	15–13	110–100
04 Jun	14:00	Rahat CSKA (Kazakhstan)	3–0	(Iran) Saipa Tehran	25–19	25–21	25–22			75–62
04 Jun	16:00	Sang Som (Thailand)	0–3	(China) Shanghai Oriental	21–25	23–25	18–25			62–75
05 Jun	14:00	HSIDC (India)	0–3	(Thailand) Sang Som	19–25	20–25	15–25			54–75
05 Jun	16:00	Shanghai Oriental (China)	3–0	(Uzbekistan) Uzi Samarkand	25–17	25–12	25–17			75–46
06 Jun	12:00	Saipa Tehran (Iran)	3–0	(India) HSIDC	25–14	25–20	25–16			75–50
06 Jun	14:00	Shanghai Oriental (China)	3–2	(Kazakhstan) Rahat CSKA	23–25	19–25	25–22	25–20	15–7	107–99
06 Jun	16:00	Habib Bank Limited (Pakistan)	3–0	(Thailand) Sang Som	25–22	25–19	25–21			75–62
07 Jun	12:00	Uzi Samarkand (Uzbekistan)	0–3	(Iran) Saipa Tehran	15–25	16–25	15–25			46–75
07 Jun	14:00	HSIDC (India)	0–3	(China) Shanghai Oriental	19–25	9–25	19–25			47–75
07 Jun	16:00	Rahat CSKA (Kazakhstan)	3–1	(Pakistan) Habib Bank Limited	25–14	25–17	24–26	25–16		99–73
08 Jun	12:00	Sang Som (Thailand)	0–3	(Kazakhstan) Rahat CSKA	15–25	21–25	14–25			50–75
08 Jun	14:00	Habib Bank Limited (Pakistan)	3–2	(India) HSIDC	25–9	25–19	24–26	25–27	15–7	114–88

== Final standing ==
Rank	Team
1st place, gold medalist(s)	(Kazakhstan) Rahat CSKA
2nd place, silver medalist(s)	(Iran) Saipa Tehran
3rd place, bronze medalist(s)	(China) Shanghai Oriental
4	(Pakistan) Habib Bank Limited
5	(Thailand) Sang Som
6	(Uzbekistan) Uzi Samarkand
7	(India) HSIDC
