= Katsutoshi Tsumagari =

Japanese volleyball player (born 1975)

Katsutoshi Tsumagari (津曲 勝利; born November 2, 1975) is a volleyball player from Japan, who plays as a libero for the Men's National Team. He was named Best Digger at the 2008 Olympic Qualification Tournament, where Japan ended up in second place and qualified for the 2008 Summer Olympics in Beijing, PR China.

== Honours ==
- 2002 World Championship — 9th place
- 2003 FIVB World Cup — 9th place
- 2004 Olympic Qualification Tournament — 6th place (did not qualify)
- 2006 World Championship — 8th place
- 2007 FIVB World Cup — 9th place
- 2008 Olympic Qualification Tournament — 2nd place (qualified)
