= Shin Jin-sik =

South Korean volleyball player (born 1975)

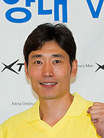
- Shin Jin-sik in 2012

Personal information
- Nationality: South Korean
- Born: 1 February 1975 (age 50)

Sport
- Sport: Volleyball

Shin Jin-sik (born 1 February 1975) is a South Korean volleyball player. He competed at the 1996 Summer Olympics and the 2000 Summer Olympics.

== Television appearances ==
- 2020, King of Mask Singer (MBC): Contestant as "Crunchy Balloon Bread" (episode 285)
