= Mohammad Soleimani (volleyball) =

Iranian volleyball player (born 1987)

Personal information
- Nationality: Iranian
- Born: 23 September 1987 (age 39)
- Height: 193 cm (6 ft 4 in)
- Weight: 90 kg (198 lb)
- Spike: 335 cm (132 in)
- Block: 313 cm (123 in)

Volleyball information
- Number: 14 (national team)

Career
Years	Teams
2006	Paykan Tehran

National team
2006	Iran
Honours
Men's volleyball
Representing Iran
U19 World Championship
Silver medal – second place	2001 Cairo
Bronze medal – third place	2003 Suphanburi

Mohammad Soleimani (born 23 September 1987) is a former Iranian male volleyball player. He was part of the Iran men's national volleyball team at the 2006 FIVB Volleyball Men's World Championship in Japan. He played for Paykan Tehran.

== Clubs ==
- Paykan Tehran
- Pegah Urmia
- Al-Ahli
- Erteashat Sanati
- Azad University
- Saipa
