= 2004 Asian Men's Club Volleyball Championship =

Tournament held in Iran

2004 Asian Club Championship
Tournament details
- Host country: Iran
- Dates: 23–28 April
- Teams: 7
- Venue: 1 (in 1 host city)

Final positions
- Champions: (Iran) Sanam Tehran (1st title)

Tournament awards
- MVP: (Iran) Mohammad Torkashvand

The 2004 Asian Men's Club Volleyball Championship was the 5th staging of the AVC Club Championships. The tournament was held in Azadi Volleyball Hall, Tehran, Iran. Sanam of Iran won the tournament after beating Paykan of Iran.

== Preliminary round ==
=== Pool A ===
Pos	Team	Pld	W	L	Pts	SW	SL	SR	SPW	SPL	SPR	Qualification
1	(Iran) Sanam Tehran	3	3	0	6	9	1	9.000	252	186	1.355	Semifinals
2	(China) Shanghai Oriental	3	2	1	5	7	4	1.750	256	233	1.099	Semifinals
3	(Qatar) Al-Arabi	3	1	2	4	4	6	0.667	220	237	0.928	5th–7th place
4	(Uzbekistan) AGMK	3	0	3	3	0	9	0.000	153	225	0.680	5th–7th place

Date	Time		Score		Set 1	Set 2	Set 3	Set 4	Set 5	Total
23 Apr	14:00	AGMK (Uzbekistan)	0–3	(China) Shanghai Oriental	22–25	13–25	12–25			47–75
23 Apr	17:00	Sanam Tehran (Iran)	3–0	(Qatar) Al-Arabi	25–23	25–19	25–19			75–61
24 Apr	17:00	Sanam Tehran (Iran)	3–0	(Uzbekistan) AGMK	25–11	25–19	25–12			75–42
24 Apr	19:00	Al-Arabi (Qatar)	1–3	(China) Shanghai Oriental	19–25	25–23	18–25	22–25		84–98
25 Apr	17:00	Shanghai Oriental (China)	1–3	(Iran) Sanam Tehran	25–23	27–29	12–25	19–25		83–102
25 Apr	19:00	AGMK (Uzbekistan)	0–3	(Qatar) Al-Arabi	23–25	18–25	23–25			64–75

=== Pool B ===
Pos	Team	Pld	W	L	Pts	SW	SL	SR	SPW	SPL	SPR	Qualification
1	(Iran) Paykan Tehran	2	2	0	4	6	1	6.000	170	129	1.318	Semifinals
2	(Kazakhstan) Atyrau	2	1	1	3	4	3	1.333	160	143	1.119	Semifinals
3	(Chinese Taipei) National Train Center	2	0	2	2	0	6	0.000	92	150	0.613	5th–7th place

Date	Time		Score		Set 1	Set 2	Set 3	Set 4	Set 5	Total
23 Apr	19:00	National Train Center (Chinese Taipei)	0–3	(Kazakhstan) Atyrau	12–25	17–25	19–25			48–75
24 Apr	17:00	National Train Center (Chinese Taipei)	0–3	(Iran) Paykan Tehran	15–25	16–25	13–25			44–75
25 Apr	15:00	Atyrau (Kazakhstan)	1–3	(Iran) Paykan Tehran	25–20	19–25	22–25	19–25		85–95

== Classification 5th–7th ==
5th–7th places
27 April – Tehran
(Qatar) Al-Arabi
Bye
27 April – Tehran
(Chinese Taipei) NTC	3
(Uzbekistan) AGMK	2

5th place
28 April – Tehran
(Qatar) Al-Arabi	3
(Chinese Taipei) NTC	1

=== Semifinals ===
Date	Time		Score		Set 1	Set 2	Set 3	Set 4	Set 5	Total
27 Apr	15:00	National Train Center (Chinese Taipei)	3–2	(Uzbekistan) AGMK	25–19	24–26	19–25	26–24	15–13	109–107

=== 5th place ===
Date	Time		Score		Set 1	Set 2	Set 3	Set 4	Set 5	Total
28 Apr	10:00	Al-Arabi (Qatar)	3–1	(Chinese Taipei) National Train Center	23–25	27–25	25–22	25–16		100–88

== Final round ==
Semifinals
27 April – Tehran
(Iran) Sanam	3
(Kazakhstan) Atyrau	0
27 April – Tehran
(Iran) Paykan	3
(China) Shanghai	0

Final
28 April – Tehran
(Iran) Sanam	3
(Iran) Paykan	0
3rd place
28 April – Tehran
(Kazakhstan) Atyrau	3
(China) Shanghai	0

=== Semifinals ===
Date	Time		Score		Set 1	Set 2	Set 3	Set 4	Set 5	Total
27 Apr	17:15	Sanam Tehran (Iran)	3–0	(Kazakhstan) Atyrau	25–17	25–21	25–20			75–58
27 Apr	19:00	Paykan Tehran (Iran)	3–0	(China) Shanghai Oriental	25–23	25–23	25–20			75–66

=== 3rd place ===
Date	Time		Score		Set 1	Set 2	Set 3	Set 4	Set 5	Total
28 Apr	15:00	Atyrau (Kazakhstan)	3–0	(China) Shanghai Oriental	25–21	25–18	25–18			75–57

=== Final ===
Date	Time		Score		Set 1	Set 2	Set 3	Set 4	Set 5	Total
28 Apr	17:00	Sanam Tehran (Iran)	3–0	(Iran) Paykan Tehran	26–24	25–21	26–24			77–69

== Final standing ==
Rank	Team
1st place, gold medalist(s)	(Iran) Sanam Tehran
2nd place, silver medalist(s)	(Iran) Paykan Tehran
3rd place, bronze medalist(s)	(Kazakhstan) Atyrau
4	(China) Shanghai Oriental
5	(Qatar) Al-Arabi
6	(Chinese Taipei) National Train Center
7	(Uzbekistan) AGMK

== Awards ==
- MVP: (Iran) Mohammad Torkashvand (Sanam)
- Best scorer: (China) Fang Yingchao (Shanghai)
- Best spiker: (Kazakhstan) Yevgeniy Senatorov (Atyrau)
- Best server: (Iran) Amir Hossein Monazzami (Sanam)
- Best blocker: (Iran) Saeid Rezaei (Paykan)
- Best receiver: (Iran) Azim Jazideh (Sanam)
- Best setter: (Iran) Amir Hosseini (Sanam)
- Best digger: (Iran) Azim Jazideh (Sanam)
