= Sanam Tehran Sports Club =

Sanam Tehran Sports Club (Persian: باشگاه ورزشی صنام تهران, Bâshgâh-e Varzeshi-ye Sanâm-e Tehrân) was an Iranian multisport club based in Tehran, Iran.

== Basketball ==
- Iranian Super League

Winners (2): 2003, 2005
Runners-up (2): 2002, 2004

- West Asian Club Championships

Winners (1): 2003
Third place (1): 2004

== Volleyball ==
- Iranian Super League

Winners (4): 2001, 2002, 2004, 2005
Runners-up (2): 1999, 2003
Third place (1): 2000

- Asian Club Championships

Winners (1): 2004
Runners-up (1): 2002
