= Volleyball Federation of the Republic of Kazakhstan =

Governing body for volleyball in Kazakhstan

Kazakhstan Volleyball Federation
- Sport: Volleyball
- Jurisdiction: Kazakhstan
- Abbreviation: KVF
- Founded: 1992; 34 years ago
- Affiliation: FIVB
- Regional affiliation: AVC
- Headquarters: Bogenbay Batyr str. 132, Almaty
- President: Madi Takiyev

Official website
- volley.kz
- (Kazakhstan)

The Kazakhstan Volleyball Federation (KVF; Kazakh: Қазақстанның волейбол федерациясы) is the governing body for volleyball in Kazakhstan. It was founded in 1992, and has been a member of FIVB. It is also a member of the Asian Volleyball Confederation. The VFRK is responsible for organizing the men's and women's national volleyball team.

== National teams ==
For details please refer to main articles for dedicated teams.

Men's

- Kazakhstan men's national volleyball team
- Under-21
- Under-19
- Under-17

Women's

- Kazakhstan women's national volleyball team
- Under-21
- Under-19
- Under-17
