= Islamic Republic of Iran Volleyball Federation =

- IRIVF logo
- Formation: 1945
- Type: Sports organization
- Members: Fédération Internationale de Volleyball (1959)
- Official language: Persian
- President: Milad Taghavi
- Website: volleyball.ir

The Islamic Republic of Iran Volleyball Federation (I.R.I.V.F.) is the governing body for Volleyball in Iran. It was founded in 1945, and has been a member of FIVB. It was a part of Iranian Basketball Federation till 1957. It is also a member of the Asian Volleyball Confederation. The IRIVF is responsible for organizing the Iran men's national volleyball team and Iran women's national volleyball team.

== Previous Presidents ==
1. Amir Abbas Amin (1957–1963)
2. Kazem Rahbari (1963–1967)
3. Ali Akbar Mirfakhraei (1967–1968)
4. Kamal Khanli (1968–1969)
5. Fereidoun Farrokhnia (1969–1972)
6. Mehdi Khazaei (1972–1974)
7. Farhad Masoudi (1974–1978)
8. Manouchehr Shapouri (1978–1979)
9. Mahmoud Adl (1979–1980)
10. Gholamreza Jabbari (1980–1981)
11. Jaber Khalafzadeh (1981–1982)
12. Hossein Alirezaei (1982–1984)
13. Gholamreza Jabbari (1984–1987)
14. Parviz Khaki (1987–1990)
15. Mohammad Reza Yazdani-Khorram (1990–2006)
16. Mohammad Reza Davarzani (2006–2017)
17. Ahmad Ziaei (2017–2018)
18. Afshin Davari (Acting) (2018–2019)
19. Ali Fattahi (Acting) (2019)
20. Mohammad Reza Davarzani (2019–2023)
21. Vahid Moradi (Acting) (2023–2024)
22. Milad Taghavi (2024–Present)
