= China Volleyball Association =

Volleyball governing body of China

China Volleyball Association 中国排球协会
- Sport: Volleyball; Beach volleyball
- Jurisdiction: China
- Abbreviation: CVA
- Founded: 1953; 73 years ago
- Affiliation: FIVB
- Regional affiliation: AVC
- Headquarters: Beijing, China
- Location: 2 Tiyuguan Road, 100763, Beijing
- President: Yuan Weimin
- Secretary: Lai Yawen

Official website
- volleyballchina.com
- (China)

China Volleyball Association (Chinese: 中国排球协会; pinyin: Zhōngguó Páiqiú Xiéhuì) is a national non-governmental, nonprofit sports organization in the People's Republic of China. It represents China in the Fédération Internationale de Volleyball and the Asian Volleyball Confederation, as well as the volleyball sports in the All-China Sports Federation. It also manages men's and women's national volleyball team of China and organizes Chinese Volleyball Super League.

== National teams ==
For details please refer to main articles for dedicated teams.

Men's

- China men's national volleyball team
- Under-21
- Under-19
- Under-17

Women's

- China women's national volleyball team
- Under-21
- Under-19
- Under-17

== See also ==
- Chinese Volleyball Super League
