= Abdylla Gurbannepesow =

Turkmen futsal player and footballer

Abdylla Gurbannepesov
Personal information
- Full name: Abdylla Gurbannepesow
- Date of birth: 13 August 1985 (age 41)
- Place of birth: Aşgabat, USSR
- Position: Midfielder

Team information
- Current team: Migrasiya
- Number: 12

Senior career*
Years	Team	Apps	(Gls)
2006-2010	FC HTTU		
2019–	Migrasiya		

International career^{‡}
2009	Turkmenistan	2	(0)
2009	Turkmenistan (futsal)		
- * Club domestic league appearances and goals as of 8 November 2019 ‡ National team caps and goals as of 23 September 2019

Abdylla Gurbannepesov (Turkmen: Abdylla Gurbannepesow) is a Turkmen professional futsal and former soccer player. He is currently a member of Migrasiya futsal club in the Turkmenistan Futsal League. Captain of Turkmenistan national futsal team.

== Biography ==
Employee of the State Migration Service of Turkmenistan.

== Football career ==
As part of the FC Altyn Asyr won the 2009 Turkmenistan Cup, scored one goal in the final match against FC Merw (3:0).

In 2010 he played for the FC HTTU in Ýokary Liga and AFC President's Cup.

== Futsal career ==
In recent years he has been playing for the futsal club Migrasiya. He became the winner of the Futsal Cup of Turkmenistan 2019 and the best player of the tournament.

== International career ==
He was involved in the national football team of Turkmenistan for games at Ho Chi Minh City Cup in Vietnam. Gurbannepesow made his senior national team debut on 20 October 2009 against Vietnami, coming to the substitution at the 46 minute. The last call for football national team received in 2011.

He played for Turkmenistan futsal team at 2017 Asian Indoor and Martial Arts Games.

As a captain of the futsal team of Turkmenistan, participated in the final draw of 2020 AFC Futsal Championship.

== Honours ==
Turkmenistan Cup:

- Winner: 2009

Turkmenistan Futsal Cup:

- Winner: 2019

Turkmenistan Futsal Championship:

- Runner-up: 2018
