= Turkmenistan Futsal Super Cup =

- Founded: 2019; 6 years ago
- Region: Turkmenistan (Football Federation of Turkmenistan)
- Teams: 2
- Current champions: Köpetdag (2nd title)
- Most championships: Köpetdag (2nd title)
- Broadcaster: Sport (Turkmen TV channel)

The Turkmenistan Futsal Super Cup is a Turkmenistan futsal competition contested by the winners of the Turkmenistan Futsal League and the winners of the Turkmenistan Futsal Cup.

== Winners ==
Year	Winners	Runners-up	Score
2019	Köpetdag	Deňizçi	3:3 (3:1 by penalty)
2020	Köpetdag	Migrasiya	5:2

== Performance by club ==
Team	Winners	Runners-up	Winning years
Köpetdag	2	0	2019, 2020
Deňizçi	0	1	
Migrasiya	0	1	
