= 2009 Asian Men's Club Volleyball Championship =

2009 Asian Club Championship

Tournament details
- Host country: United Arab Emirates
- Dates: 17–24 June
- Teams: 13
- Venue: 1 (in 1 host city)

Final positions
- Champions: (Iran) Paykan Tehran (5th title)

Tournament awards
- MVP: (Algeria) Hicham Guemmadi

The 2009 Asian Men's Club Volleyball Championship was the 10th staging of the AVC Club Championships. The tournament was held in Dubai, United Arab Emirates.

== Pools composition ==
The teams are seeded based on their final ranking at the 2008 Asian Men's Club Volleyball Championship.

Pool A	Pool B	Pool C	Pool D
United Arab Emirates (Host); Kuwait (6th); ~~Afghanistan~~ *	Iran (1st); Bahrain (7th); Lebanon	Kazakhstan (2nd); Uzbekistan; Qatar; Thailand	Japan (3rd); Saudi Arabia; Indonesia; Maldives

* Withdrew

== Preliminary round ==
=== Pool A ===
Pos	Team	Pld	W	L	Pts	SW	SL	SR	SPW	SPL	SPR	Qualification
1	(United Arab Emirates) Al-Nasr	1	1	0	2	3	1	3.000	97	87	1.115	Pool E
2	(Kuwait) Al-Qadsia	1	0	1	1	1	3	0.333	87	97	0.897	Pool E

Date	Time		Score		Set 1	Set 2	Set 3	Set 4	Set 5	Total	Report
17 Jun	17:00	Al-Nasr (United Arab Emirates)	3–1	(Kuwait) Al-Qadsia	25–21	25–21	22–25	25–20		97–87	Report

=== Pool B ===
Pos	Team	Pld	W	L	Pts	SW	SL	SR	SPW	SPL	SPR	Qualification
1	(Iran) Paykan Tehran	2	2	0	4	6	0	MAX	150	99	1.515	Pool F
2	(Bahrain) Dar Kulaib	2	1	1	3	3	3	1.000	142	135	1.052	Pool F
3	(Lebanon) Jeunesse Bauchrieh	2	0	2	2	0	6	0.000	101	159	0.635	Pool H

Date	Time		Score		Set 1	Set 2	Set 3	Set 4	Set 5	Total	Report
17 Jun	19:30	Paykan Tehran (Iran)	3–0	(Bahrain) Dar Kulaib	25–22	25–21	25–15			75–58	Report
18 Jun	12:00	Jeunesse Bauchrieh (Lebanon)	0–3	(Iran) Paykan Tehran	14–25	13–25	14–25			41–75	Report
19 Jun	19:00	Dar Kulaib (Bahrain)	3–0	(Lebanon) Jeunesse Bauchrieh	25–16	25–12	34–32			84–60	Report

=== Pool C ===
Pos	Team	Pld	W	L	Pts	SW	SL	SR	SPW	SPL	SPR	Qualification
1	(Qatar) Al-Arabi	3	3	0	6	9	0	MAX	225	171	1.316	Pool E
2	(Thailand) Royal Thai	3	2	1	5	6	4	1.500	226	201	1.124	Pool E
3	(Kazakhstan) Almaty	3	1	2	4	4	6	0.667	220	212	1.038	Pool G
4	(Uzbekistan) AGMK	3	0	3	3	0	9	0.000	138	225	0.613	Pool G

Date	Time		Score		Set 1	Set 2	Set 3	Set 4	Set 5	Total	Report
17 Jun	12:00	Royal Thai (Thailand)	3–1	(Kazakhstan) Almaty	25–21	25–20	16–25	25–22		91–88	
17 Jun	21:30	AGMK (Uzbekistan)	0–3	(Qatar) Al-Arabi	16–25	15–25	23–25			54–75	Report
18 Jun	17:00	Royal Thai (Thailand)	3–0	(Uzbekistan) AGMK	25–12	25–14	25–12			75–38	Report
18 Jun	19:00	Almaty (Kazakhstan)	0–3	(Qatar) Al-Arabi	20–25	19–25	18–25			57–75	Report
19 Jun	09:30	AGMK (Uzbekistan)	0–3	(Kazakhstan) Almaty	16–25	12–25	18–25			46–75	Report
19 Jun	21:00	Al-Arabi (Qatar)	3–0	(Thailand) Royal Thai	25–21	25–17	25–22			75–60	Report

=== Pool D ===
Pos	Team	Pld	W	L	Pts	SW	SL	SR	SPW	SPL	SPR	Qualification
1	(Saudi Arabia) Al-Hilal	3	3	0	6	9	1	9.000	247	167	1.479	Pool F
2	(Japan) Suntory Sunbirds	3	2	1	5	7	4	1.750	251	214	1.173	Pool F
3	(Indonesia) Surabaya Samator	3	1	2	4	4	6	0.667	210	214	0.981	Pool H
4	(Maldives) Dhivehi Sifainge	3	0	3	3	0	9	0.000	112	225	0.498	Pool H

Date	Time		Score		Set 1	Set 2	Set 3	Set 4	Set 5	Total	Report
17 Jun	10:00	Suntory Sunbirds (Japan)	3–0	(Maldives) Dhivehi Sifainge	25–8	25–18	25–10			75–36	
17 Jun	15:00	Al-Hilal (Saudi Arabia)	3–0	(Indonesia) Surabaya Samator	25–19	25–22	25–13			75–54	Report
18 Jun	15:00	Dhivehi Sifainge (Maldives)	0–3	(Indonesia) Surabaya Samator	13–25	18–25	14–25			45–75	Report
18 Jun	21:00	Suntory Sunbirds (Japan)	1–3	(Saudi Arabia) Al-Hilal	25–22	16–25	21–25	20–25		82–97	Report
19 Jun	15:00	Surabaya Samator (Indonesia)	1–3	(Japan) Suntory Sunbirds	25–19	17–25	19–25	20–25		81–94	Report
19 Jun	17:00	Al-Hilal (Saudi Arabia)	3–0	(Maldives) Dhivehi Sifainge	25–5	25–11	25–15			75–31	Report

== Quarterfinals ==
- The results and the points of the matches between the same teams that were already played during the preliminary round shall be taken into account for the Quarterfinals.

=== Pool E ===
Pos	Team	Pld	W	L	Pts	SW	SL	SR	SPW	SPL	SPR	Qualification
1	(United Arab Emirates) Al-Nasr	3	3	0	6	9	5	1.800	322	310	1.039	Semifinals
2	(Qatar) Al-Arabi	3	2	1	5	8	3	2.667	260	219	1.187	Semifinals
3	(Thailand) Royal Thai	3	1	2	4	5	7	0.714	268	276	0.971	5th–8th place
4	(Kuwait) Al-Qadsia	3	0	3	3	2	9	0.222	222	267	0.831	5th–8th place

Date	Time		Score		Set 1	Set 2	Set 3	Set 4	Set 5	Total	Report
20 Jun	15:00	Al-Nasr (United Arab Emirates)	3–2	(Thailand) Royal Thai	23–25	25–20	23–25	27–25	20–18	118–113	Report
20 Jun	17:00	Al-Arabi (Qatar)	3–0	(Kuwait) Al-Qadsia	25–18	25–11	25–23			75–52	Report
21 Jun	15:00	Al-Qadsia (Kuwait)	1–3	(Thailand) Royal Thai	16–25	21–25	25–20	21–25		83–95	Report
21 Jun	17:00	Al-Nasr (United Arab Emirates)	3–2	(Qatar) Al-Arabi	17–25	25–22	29–27	21–25	15–11	107–110	Report

=== Pool F ===
Pos	Team	Pld	W	L	Pts	SW	SL	SR	SPW	SPL	SPR	Qualification
1	(Iran) Paykan Tehran	3	3	0	6	9	0	MAX	226	165	1.370	Semifinals
2	(Saudi Arabia) Al-Hilal	3	2	1	5	6	5	1.200	248	239	1.038	Semifinals
3	(Japan) Suntory Sunbirds	3	1	2	4	4	7	0.571	232	252	0.921	5th–8th place
4	(Bahrain) Dar Kulaib	3	0	3	3	2	9	0.222	219	269	0.814	5th–8th place

Date	Time		Score		Set 1	Set 2	Set 3	Set 4	Set 5	Total	Report
20 Jun	19:00	Paykan Tehran (Iran)	3–0	(Japan) Suntory Sunbirds	26–24	25–19	25–13			76–56	Report
20 Jun	21:00	Al-Hilal (Saudi Arabia)	3–1	(Bahrain) Dar Kulaib	25–19	25–27	25–23	25–13		100–82	Report
21 Jun	19:00	Dar Kulaib (Bahrain)	1–3	(Japan) Suntory Sunbirds	25–19	20–25	12–25	22–25		79–94	Report
21 Jun	21:00	Paykan Tehran (Iran)	3–0	(Saudi Arabia) Al-Hilal	25–18	25–17	25–16			75–51	Report

=== Pool G ===
Pos	Team	Pld	W	L	Pts	SW	SL	SR	SPW	SPL	SPR	Qualification
1	(Kazakhstan) Almaty	1	1	0	2	3	0	MAX	75	46	1.630	9th–12th place
2	(Uzbekistan) AGMK	1	0	1	1	0	3	0.000	46	75	0.613	9th–12th place

=== Pool H ===
Pos	Team	Pld	W	L	Pts	SW	SL	SR	SPW	SPL	SPR	Qualification
1	(Indonesia) Surabaya Samator	2	2	0	4	6	0	MAX	150	93	1.613	9th–12th place
2	(Lebanon) Jeunesse Bauchrieh	2	1	1	3	3	4	0.750	145	164	0.884	9th–12th place
3	(Maldives) Dhivehi Sifainge	2	0	2	2	1	6	0.167	134	172	0.779	

Date	Time		Score		Set 1	Set 2	Set 3	Set 4	Set 5	Total	Report
20 Jun	12:00	Jeunesse Bauchrieh (Lebanon)	3–1	(Maldives) Dhivehi Sifainge	25–22	25–19	22–25	25–23		97–89	Report
21 Jun	12:00	Jeunesse Bauchrieh (Lebanon)	0–3	(Indonesia) Surabaya Samator	14–25	16–25	18–25			48–75	Report

== Classification 9th–12th ==
9th–12th places
23 June – Dubai
(Kazakhstan) Almaty	3
(Lebanon) Bauchrieh	1
23 June – Dubai
(Indonesia) Samator	3
(Uzbekistan) AGMK	0

9th place
24 June – Dubai
(Kazakhstan) Almaty	3
(Indonesia) Samator	0
11th place
24 June – Dubai
(Lebanon) Bauchrieh	1
(Uzbekistan) AGMK	3

=== Semifinals ===
Date	Time		Score		Set 1	Set 2	Set 3	Set 4	Set 5	Total	Report
23 Jun	10:00	Almaty (Kazakhstan)	3–1	(Lebanon) Jeunesse Bauchrieh	25–16	25–23	26–28	25–17		101–84	Report
23 Jun	12:00	Surabaya Samator (Indonesia)	3–0	(Uzbekistan) AGMK	25–15	25–19	25–18			75–52	Report

=== 11th place ===
Date	Time		Score		Set 1	Set 2	Set 3	Set 4	Set 5	Total	Report
24 Jun	09:30	Jeunesse Bauchrieh (Lebanon)	1–3	(Uzbekistan) AGMK	21–25	23–25	25–23	7–25		76–98	

=== 9th place ===
Date	Time		Score		Set 1	Set 2	Set 3	Set 4	Set 5	Total	Report
24 Jun	11:30	Almaty (Kazakhstan)	3–0	(Indonesia) Surabaya Samator	25–17	25–17	25–21			75–55	Report

== Classification 5th–8th ==
5th–8th places
23 June – Dubai
(Thailand) Royal Thai	3
(Bahrain) Dar Kulaib	2
23 June – Dubai
(Japan) Suntory	3
(Kuwait) Al-Qadsia	0

5th place
24 June – Dubai
(Thailand) Royal Thai	0
(Japan) Suntory	3
7th place
24 June – Dubai
(Bahrain) Dar Kulaib	0
(Kuwait) Al-Qadsia	3

=== Semifinals ===
Date	Time		Score		Set 1	Set 2	Set 3	Set 4	Set 5	Total	Report
23 Jun	15:00	Royal Thai (Thailand)	3–2	(Bahrain) Dar Kulaib	21–25	20–25	25–23	25–21	15–12	106–106	Report
23 Jun	17:00	Suntory Sunbirds (Japan)	3–0	(Kuwait) Al-Qadsia	25–17	25–23	25–22			75–62	Report

=== 7th place ===
Date	Time		Score		Set 1	Set 2	Set 3	Set 4	Set 5	Total	Report
24 Jun	13:30	Dar Kulaib (Bahrain)	0–3	(Kuwait) Al-Qadsia	27–29	18–25	30–32			75–86	Report

=== 5th place ===
Date	Time		Score		Set 1	Set 2	Set 3	Set 4	Set 5	Total	Report
24 Jun	15:30	Royal Thai (Thailand)	0–3	(Japan) Suntory Sunbirds	18–25	17–25	19–25			54–75	Report

== Final round ==
Semifinals
23 June – Dubai
(United Arab Emirates) Al-Nasr	2
(Saudi Arabia) Al-Hilal	3
23 June – Dubai
(Iran) Paykan	3
(Qatar) Al-Arabi	0

Final
24 June – Dubai
(Saudi Arabia) Al-Hilal	0
(Iran) Paykan	3
3rd place
24 June – Dubai
(United Arab Emirates) Al-Nasr	0
(Qatar) Al-Arabi	3

=== Semifinals ===
Date	Time		Score		Set 1	Set 2	Set 3	Set 4	Set 5	Total	Report
23 Jun	19:00	Al-Nasr (United Arab Emirates)	2–3	(Saudi Arabia) Al-Hilal	15–25	25–18	25–19	23–25	18–20	106–107	Report
23 Jun	21:00	Paykan Tehran (Iran)	3–0	(Qatar) Al-Arabi	25–23	25–15	25–21			75–59	Report

=== 3rd place ===
Date	Time		Score		Set 1	Set 2	Set 3	Set 4	Set 5	Total	Report
24 Jun	17:30	Al-Nasr (United Arab Emirates)	0–3	(Qatar) Al-Arabi	19–25	19–25	15–25			53–75	Report

=== Final ===
Date	Time		Score		Set 1	Set 2	Set 3	Set 4	Set 5	Total	Report
24 Jun	19:30	Al-Hilal (Saudi Arabia)	0–3	(Iran) Paykan Tehran	20–25	22–25	19–25			61–75	Report

== Final standing ==
Rank	Team
1st place, gold medalist(s)	(Iran) Paykan Tehran
2nd place, silver medalist(s)	(Saudi Arabia) Al-Hilal
3rd place, bronze medalist(s)	(Qatar) Al-Arabi
4	(United Arab Emirates) Al-Nasr
5	(Japan) Suntory Sunbirds
6	(Thailand) Royal Thai
7	(Kuwait) Al-Qadsia
8	(Bahrain) Dar Kulaib
9	(Kazakhstan) Almaty
10	(Indonesia) Surabaya Samator
11	(Uzbekistan) AGMK
12	(Lebanon) Jeunesse Bauchrieh
13	(Maldives) Dhivehi Sifainge

Qualified for the 2009 Club World Championship

== Awards ==
- MVP: (Algeria) Hicham Guemmadi (Al-Nasr)
- Best scorer: (Iran) Farhad Nazari Afshar (Paykan)
- Best server: (Croatia) Igor Omrčen (Al-Arabi)
- Best spiker: (Saudi Arabia) Ahmed Al-Bakhit (Al-Hilal)
- Best blocker: (Qatar) Ibrahim Mohammed (Al-Arabi)
- Best setter: (United Arab Emirates) Khaled Al-Hosni (Al-Nasr)
- Best libero: (Iran) Farhad Zarif (Paykan)
