= Emirati Men's Volleyball League =

- Current season, competition or edition: 2024–25 Emirati League
- Sport: Volleyball
- First season: 1974; 52 years ago
- Administrator: UAEVBA
- No. of teams: 9 teams
- Country: United Arab Emirates
- Confederation: AVC
- Continent: Asia
- Most recent champion: Baniyas Club (5th titles) (2024–25)
- Most titles: Al Wasl Dubai (12 titles)
- Level on pyramid: Level 1
- Relegation to: National 2
- Domestic cups: Emirati Cup; Emirati Super Cup
- International cups: AVC Champions League; Arab Clubs Championship

The Emirati Volleyball League ( Arabic : الدوري العام الإماراتي لكرة الطائرة للرجال ) is the highest level of men's volleyball in the United Arab Emirates and it is organized by United Arab Emirates Volleyball Association. Emirati Volleyball League is currently contested by 9 clubs around the country as of the last season 2024–25.

The regular season is played by 9 teams, playing each other twice, once at home and once away from home. After the regular season, the four best-placed teams enter the play-offs and the last two teams were automatically relegated to the second division.

== Teams by Titles ==
Rank	Team	Titles
1	Al Wasl Dubai	12
2	Al Ain Abu Dhabi	11
3	Al Nasr SC Dubai	8
4	Shabab Al Ahli Club	5
=	Baniyas Club	5
6	Al Jazira Abu Dhabi	4
7	Sharjah Sport Club	1
=	Al Shabab El Arabi	1

== Winners list ==
Year	Champion
1974–75	Sharjah SC
1975–76	Shabab Al Ahli
1976–77	Not Played
1977–78	Not Played
1978–79	Shabab Al Ahli
1979–80	Al Ain SC
1980–81	Al Jazira SC
1981–82	Al Jazira SC
1982–83	Al Ain SC
1983–84	Al Wasl Dubai
1984–85	Al Ain SC
1985–86	Shabab Al Ahli
1986–87	Shabab Al Ahli
1987–88	Al Wasl Dubai
1988–89	Al Wasl Dubai
1989–90	Al Wasl Dubai
1990–91	Not Played
1991–92	Al Ain SC

Year	Champion
1992–93	Al Wasl Dubai
1993–94	Al Wasl Dubai
1994–95	Al Wasl Dubai
1995–96	Al Ain SC
1996–97	Al Wasl Dubai
1997–98	Al Wasl Dubai
1998–99	Al Wasl Dubai
1999–2000	Al Wasl Dubai
2000–01	Al Wasl Dubai
2001–02	Al Jazira SC
2002–03	Al Nasr SC
2003–04	Al Nasr SC
2004–05	Al Nasr SC
2005–06	Al Nasr SC
2006–07	Al Nasr SC
2007–08	Al Ain SC
2008–09	Al Nasr SC
2009–10	Al Shabab El Arabi

Year	Champion
2010–11	Al Ain SC
2011–12	Al Ain SC
2012–13	Al Nasr SC
2013–14	Baniyas Club
2014–15	Baniyas Club
2015–16	Al Ain SC
2016–17	Al Ain SC
2017–18	Baniyas Club
2018–19	Al Ain SC
2019–20	Not Played
2020–21	Al Nasr SC
2021–22	Shabab Al Ahli
2022–23	Baniyas Club
2023–24	Al Jazira SC
2024–25	Baniyas Club
2025–26	in progress
