= Emirati Women's Volleyball League =

- Current season, competition or edition: 2025–26 Emirati League
- Sport: Volleyball
- First season: 2008; 18 years ago
- Administrator: UAEVBA
- No. of teams: 15 teams
- Country: United Arab Emirates
- Confederation: AVC
- Continent: Asia
- Most recent champion: Al Wasl (2nd title) (2025–26)
- Most titles: Al Wasl / AUD (2 titles)
- Level on pyramid: Level 1
- Relegation to: National 2
- Domestic cups: UAE Cup; UAE Super Cup
- International cups: AVC Champions League; Arab Clubs Championship

The UAE Women’s Volleyball League (Arabic : الدوري الاماراتي للكرة الطائرة للسيدات ) is the main domestic competition for women’s volleyball clubs in the United Arab Emirates. It is organized by the UAE Volleyball Federation and includes clubs and academy teams from different parts of the country. In the 2025/26 season, the Women’s League included 15 teams, including Al Wasl, Sharjah Sports Club, Khorfakkan SC, Fatima Academy, Star Academy, CSA, Elite Academy, Abu Dhabi Spikers, Epic Academy, Elite Wolves, Abu Dhabi, Linux Academy, Aspiria, AUD, and Rio Academy. The season was divided into two stages: the preliminary stage and the playoffs. During the preliminary stage, the 15 teams were divided into five groups, with teams playing against each other twice. The five group winners and three of the teams that finished second qualified for the playoffs. AUD, which finished first in Group 4, later withdrew from the playoffs, so another second-placed team was included. In the playoffs, the quarter-finals and semi-finals were played as single matches. The matches for first and third place were played as series, with the first team to win two matches taking the position. Al Wasl won the 2025/26 championship, defeating Sharjah Sports Club 2–0 in the final series, with both matches ending 3–0. Khorfakkan SC finished third.

== Titles by Clubs ==
| Rank | Club | Titles | Winning seasons |
|---|---|---|---|
| 1 | Al Wasl | 2 | 2022–23, 2025–26 |
| 1 | American University Dubai | 2 | 2021–22, 2024–25 |
| 1 | Sharjah Sports Club | 2 | 2018–19, 2023–24 |
| 4 | Esperia Volley | 1 | 2020–21 |
| 4 | Al Jazira Sport Club | 1 | 2008–09 |

== Winners list ==
| Season | Champions |
|---|---|
| 2026–27 | |
| 2025–26 | Al Wasl |
| 2024–25 | American University Dubai |
| 2023–24 | Sharjah Sports Club |
| 2022–23 | Al Wasl |
| 2021–22 | American University Dubai |
| 2020–21 | Esperia Volley |
| 2018–19 | Sharjah Sports Club |
| 2008–09 | Al Jazira Sport Club |

Sources :
