= 2012 Asian Men's Club Volleyball Championship =

2012 Asian Club Championship

Tournament details
- Host country: China
- Dates: 30 June – 8 July
- Teams: 16
- Venues: 2 (in 1 host city)

Final positions
- Champions: (Qatar) Al-Arabi (1st title)

Tournament awards
- MVP: (Cuba) Salvador Hidalgo

The 2012 Asian Men's Club Volleyball Championship was the 13th staging of the AVC Club Championships. The tournament was held in Shanghai, China.

== Pools composition ==
The teams are seeded based on their final ranking at the 2011 Asian Men's Club Volleyball Championship.

Pool A	Pool B	Pool C	Pool D
China (Host & 3rd); Vietnam (8th); Afghanistan; ~~United Arab Emirates~~ *	Iran (1st); Qatar (7th); Uzbekistan; Myanmar	Kazakhstan (2nd); Indonesia (6th); India; Kuwait	Japan (4th); Thailand (5th); Turkmenistan; Singapore; Mongolia

* Withdrew

== Preliminary round ==
=== Pool A ===
Pos	Team	Pld	W	L	Pts	SW	SL	SR	SPW	SPL	SPR	Qualification
1	(China) Shanghai Tang Dynasty	2	2	0	6	6	0	MAX	150	40	3.750	Quarterfinals
2	(Vietnam) PTCS	2	1	1	3	3	3	1.000	115	75	1.533	Quarterfinals
3	(Afghanistan) Etisalat	2	0	2	0	0	6	0.000	0	150	0.000	9th–12th place

Date	Time		Score		Set 1	Set 2	Set 3	Set 4	Set 5	Total	Report
30 Jun	10:30	PTCS (Vietnam)	3–0	(Afghanistan) Etisalat	25–0	25–0	25–0			75–0	Forfeit
01 Jul	16:30	Shanghai Tang Dynasty (China)	3–0	(Afghanistan) Etisalat	25–0	25–0	25–0			75–0	Forfeit
03 Jul	16:30	PTCS (Vietnam)	0–3	(China) Shanghai Tang Dynasty	12–25	17–25	11–25			40–75	

=== Pool B ===
Pos	Team	Pld	W	L	Pts	SW	SL	SR	SPW	SPL	SPR	Qualification
1	(Iran) Kalleh Mazandaran	3	3	0	9	9	1	9.000	253	172	1.471	Quarterfinals
2	(Qatar) Al-Arabi	3	2	1	6	7	3	2.333	239	199	1.201	Quarterfinals
3	(Myanmar) Asia World	3	1	2	3	3	7	0.429	190	232	0.819	9th–12th place
4	(Uzbekistan) Uzbektelecom	3	0	3	0	1	9	0.111	172	251	0.685	13th–15th place

Date	Time		Score		Set 1	Set 2	Set 3	Set 4	Set 5	Total	Report
30 Jun	10:30	Uzbektelecom (Uzbekistan)	0–3	(Iran) Kalleh Mazandaran	9–25	19–25	14–25			42–75	
01 Jul	16:30	Asia World (Myanmar)	0–3	(Qatar) Al-Arabi	23–25	13–25	12–25			48–75	
02 Jul	10:30	Uzbektelecom (Uzbekistan)	1–3	(Myanmar) Asia World	25–22	17–25	13–25	27–29		82–101	
02 Jul	16:30	Kalleh Mazandaran (Iran)	3–1	(Qatar) Al-Arabi	25–20	29–27	24–26	25–16		103–89	
03 Jul	16:30	Asia World (Myanmar)	0–3	(Iran) Kalleh Mazandaran	13–25	17–25	11–25			41–75	
04 Jul	13:30	Al-Arabi (Qatar)	3–0	(Uzbekistan) Uzbektelecom	25–16	25–15	25–17			75–48	

=== Pool C ===
Pos	Team	Pld	W	L	Pts	SW	SL	SR	SPW	SPL	SPR	Qualification
1	(Kazakhstan) Almaty	3	3	0	9	9	2	4.500	272	218	1.248	Quarterfinals
2	(India) ONGC Dehradun	3	2	1	6	7	3	2.333	236	222	1.063	Quarterfinals
3	(Indonesia) Surabaya Samator	3	1	2	3	4	7	0.571	248	251	0.988	9th–12th place
4	(Kuwait) Al-Qadsia	3	0	3	0	1	9	0.111	183	248	0.738	13th–15th place

Date	Time		Score		Set 1	Set 2	Set 3	Set 4	Set 5	Total	Report
30 Jun	13:30	Almaty (Kazakhstan)	3–1	(Indonesia) Surabaya Samator	25–22	25–19	24–26	25–17		99–84	
01 Jul	10:30	ONGC Dehradun (India)	3–0	(Kuwait) Al-Qadsia	25–18	25–20	25–20			75–58	
02 Jul	13:30	Surabaya Samator (Indonesia)	3–1	(Kuwait) Al-Qadsia	23–25	25–18	25–17	25–16		98–76	
02 Jul	16:30	Almaty (Kazakhstan)	3–1	(India) ONGC Dehradun	25–20	23–25	25–21	25–19		98–85	
03 Jul	13:30	ONGC Dehradun (India)	3–0	(Indonesia) Surabaya Samator	25–22	25–20	26–24			76–66	
04 Jul	16:30	Al-Qadsia (Kuwait)	0–3	(Kazakhstan) Almaty	14–25	17–25	18–25			49–75	

=== Pool D ===
Pos	Team	Pld	W	L	Pts	SW	SL	SR	SPW	SPL	SPR	Qualification
1	(Thailand) Chonburi	4	4	0	11	12	2	6.000	345	271	1.273	Quarterfinals
2	(Japan) Toray Arrows	4	3	1	10	11	3	3.667	349	283	1.233	Quarterfinals
3	(Turkmenistan) Migrasiya	4	2	2	6	6	6	1.000	264	267	0.989	9th–12th place
4	(Mongolia) Buyant-Ukhaa	4	1	3	3	3	9	0.333	235	279	0.842	13th–15th place
5	Singapore	4	0	4	0	0	12	0.000	207	300	0.690	

Date	Time		Score		Set 1	Set 2	Set 3	Set 4	Set 5	Total	Report
30 Jun	13:30	Singapore	0–3	(Turkmenistan) Migrasiya	17–25	16–25	20–25			53–75	
30 Jun	16:30	Buyant-Ukhaa (Mongolia)	0–3	(Thailand) Chonburi	6–25	20–25	16–25			42–75	
01 Jul	10:30	Toray Arrows (Japan)	3–0	(Mongolia) Buyant-Ukhaa	25–17	25–20	25–22			75–59	
01 Jul	13:30	Chonburi (Thailand)	3–0	Singapore	25–12	25–19	25–20			75–51	
02 Jul	10:30	Migrasiya (Turkmenistan)	0–3	(Thailand) Chonburi	17–25	26–28	13–25			56–78	
02 Jul	13:30	Singapore	0–3	(Japan) Toray Arrows	16–25	12–25	21–25			49–75	
03 Jul	10:30	Buyant-Ukhaa (Mongolia)	3–0	Singapore	25–19	25–15	25–20			75–54	
03 Jul	13:30	Toray Arrows (Japan)	3–0	(Turkmenistan) Migrasiya	25–14	27–25	25–19			77–58	
04 Jul	10:30	Migrasiya (Turkmenistan)	3–0	(Mongolia) Buyant-Ukhaa	25–23	25–18	25–18			75–59	
04 Jul	16:30	Chonburi (Thailand)	3–2	(Japan) Toray Arrows	29–27	26–28	16–25	31–29	15–13	117–122	

== Classification 13th–15th ==
13th–15th places
6 July – Shanghai
Bye
(Kuwait) Al-Qadsia
6 July – Shanghai
(Uzbekistan) Uzbektelecom	3
(Mongolia) Buyant-Ukhaa	0

13th place
7 July – Shanghai
(Kuwait) Al-Qadsia	1
(Uzbekistan) Uzbektelecom	3

=== Semifinals ===
Date	Time		Score		Set 1	Set 2	Set 3	Set 4	Set 5	Total	Report
06 Jul	10:30	Uzbektelecom (Uzbekistan)	3–0	(Mongolia) Buyant-Ukhaa	25–15	25–17	25–18			75–50	Report

=== 13th place ===
Date	Time		Score		Set 1	Set 2	Set 3	Set 4	Set 5	Total	Report
07 Jul	13:30	Al-Qadsia (Kuwait)	1–3	(Uzbekistan) Uzbektelecom	21–25	20–25	25–18	11–25		77–93	Report

== Classification 9th–12th ==
9th–12th places
6 July – Shanghai
(Afghanistan) Etisalat	0
(Indonesia) Samator	3
6 July – Shanghai
(Myanmar) Asia World	0
(Turkmenistan) Migrasiya	3

9th place
7 July – Shanghai
(Indonesia) Samator	1
(Turkmenistan) Migrasiya	3
11th place
7 July – Shanghai
(Afghanistan) Etisalat	0
(Myanmar) Asia World	3

=== Semifinals ===
Date	Time		Score		Set 1	Set 2	Set 3	Set 4	Set 5	Total	Report
06 Jul	13:30	Etisalat (Afghanistan)	0–3	(Indonesia) Surabaya Samator	13–25	18–25	29–31			60–81	Report
06 Jul	13:30	Asia World (Myanmar)	0–3	(Turkmenistan) Migrasiya	20–25	21–25	16–25			57–75	Report

=== 11th place ===
Date	Time		Score		Set 1	Set 2	Set 3	Set 4	Set 5	Total	Report
07 Jul	16:30	Etisalat (Afghanistan)	0–3	(Myanmar) Asia World	19–25	19–25	16–25			54–75	Report

=== 9th place ===
Date	Time		Score		Set 1	Set 2	Set 3	Set 4	Set 5	Total	Report
07 Jul	19:30	Surabaya Samator (Indonesia)	1–3	(Turkmenistan) Migrasiya	13–25	20–25	25–19	20–25		78–94	Report

== Final round ==
Quarterfinals
6 July – Shanghai
(China) Shanghai	3
(India) ONGC	0
6 July – Shanghai
(Kazakhstan) Almaty	3
(Vietnam) PTCS	0
6 July – Shanghai
(Iran) Kalleh	3
(Japan) Toray Arrows	0
6 July – Shanghai
(Thailand) Chonburi	0
(Qatar) Al-Arabi	3

Semifinals
7 July – Shanghai
(China) Shanghai	3
(Kazakhstan) Almaty	1
7 July – Shanghai
(Iran) Kalleh	1
(Qatar) Al-Arabi	3

Final
8 July – Shanghai
(China) Shanghai	1
(Qatar) Al-Arabi	3
3rd place
8 July – Shanghai
(Kazakhstan) Almaty	0
(Iran) Kalleh	3

5th–8th places
7 July – Shanghai
(India) ONGC	0
(Vietnam) PTCS	3
7 July – Shanghai
(Japan) Toray Arrows	1
(Thailand) Chonburi	3

5th place
8 July – Shanghai
(Vietnam) PTCS	1
(Thailand) Chonburi	3
7th place
8 July – Shanghai
(India) ONGC	2
(Japan) Toray Arrows	3

=== Quarterfinals ===
Date	Time		Score		Set 1	Set 2	Set 3	Set 4	Set 5	Total	Report
06 Jul	16:30	Shanghai Tang Dynasty (China)	3–0	(India) ONGC Dehradun	25–23	31–29	25–22			81–74	Report
06 Jul	16:30	Kalleh Mazandaran (Iran)	3–0	(Japan) Toray Arrows	25–15	25–18	25–17			75–50	Report
06 Jul	19:30	Almaty (Kazakhstan)	3–0	(Vietnam) PTCS	25–16	25–17	25–16			75–49	
06 Jul	19:30	Chonburi (Thailand)	0–3	(Qatar) Al-Arabi	26–28	26–28	17–25			69–81	

=== 5th–8th semifinals ===
Date	Time		Score		Set 1	Set 2	Set 3	Set 4	Set 5	Total	Report
07 Jul	10:00	ONGC Dehradun (India)	0–3	(Vietnam) PTCS	20–25	17–25	21–25			58–75	Report
07 Jul	12:00	Toray Arrows (Japan)	1–3	(Thailand) Chonburi	35–37	26–24	20–25	15–25		96–111	Report

=== Semifinals ===
Date	Time		Score		Set 1	Set 2	Set 3	Set 4	Set 5	Total	Report
07 Jul	14:00	Shanghai Tang Dynasty (China)	3–1	(Kazakhstan) Almaty	21–25	25–15	25–18	25–20		96–78	Report
07 Jul	16:00	Kalleh Mazandaran (Iran)	1–3	(Qatar) Al-Arabi	25–22	25–27	17–25	17–25		84–99	Report

=== 7th place ===
Date	Time		Score		Set 1	Set 2	Set 3	Set 4	Set 5	Total	Report
08 Jul	10:00	ONGC Dehradun (India)	2–3	(Japan) Toray Arrows	23–25	28–26	25–20	22–25	15–17	113–113	

=== 5th place ===
Date	Time		Score		Set 1	Set 2	Set 3	Set 4	Set 5	Total	Report
08 Jul	12:00	PTCS (Vietnam)	1–3	(Thailand) Chonburi	23–25	22–25	25–20	19–25		89–95	

=== 3rd place ===
Date	Time		Score		Set 1	Set 2	Set 3	Set 4	Set 5	Total	Report
08 Jul	14:00	Almaty (Kazakhstan)	0–3	(Iran) Kalleh Mazandaran	22–25	17–25	23–25			62–75	

=== Final ===
Date	Time		Score		Set 1	Set 2	Set 3	Set 4	Set 5	Total	Report
08 Jul	16:00	Shanghai Tang Dynasty (China)	1–3	(Qatar) Al-Arabi	25–17	17–25	22–25	23–25		87–92	

== Final standing ==
Rank	Team
1st place, gold medalist(s)	(Qatar) Al-Arabi
2nd place, silver medalist(s)	(China) Shanghai Tang Dynasty
3rd place, bronze medalist(s)	(Iran) Kalleh Mazandaran
4	(Kazakhstan) Almaty
5	(Thailand) Chonburi
6	(Vietnam) PTCS
7	(Japan) Toray Arrows
8	(India) ONGC Dehradun
9	(Turkmenistan) Migrasiya
10	(Indonesia) Surabaya Samator
11	(Myanmar) Asia World
12	(Afghanistan) Etisalat
13	(Uzbekistan) Uzbektelecom
14	(Kuwait) Al-Qadsia
15	(Mongolia) Buyant-Ukhaa
16	Singapore

Qualified for the 2012 Club World Championship

== Awards ==
- MVP: (Cuba) Salvador Hidalgo (Al-Arabi)
- Best scorer: (Germany) Christian Pampel (Al-Arabi)
- Best spiker: (Iran) Shahram Mahmoudi (Kalleh)
- Best blocker: (Iran) Adel Gholami (Kalleh)
- Best server: (Cuba) Salvador Hidalgo (Al-Arabi)
- Best setter: (Qatar) Saeed Juma Al-Hitmi (Al-Arabi)
- Best libero: (China) Tong Jihua (Shanghai)
