= 2015 Asian Men's Club Volleyball Championship =

2015 Asian Men's Club Championship
Tournament details
- Host country: Taiwan
- Dates: 13–21 August
- Teams: 16
- Venues: 2 (in 1 host city)

Final positions
- Champions: Taichung Bank (1st title)

Tournament awards
- MVP: (Chinese Taipei) Huang Pei-Hung (TPE)

The 2015 Asian Men's Club Volleyball Championship was the 16th staging of the AVC Club Championships. The tournament was held in Taipei, Taiwan from 13 to 21 August 2015. The champions qualified for the 2016 FIVB Volleyball Men's Club World Championship as Asia's representative.

== Pools composition ==
Teams were seeded in the first two positions of each pool following the serpentine system according to their final standing of the 2014 edition. AVC reserved the right to seed the hosts as head of pool A regardless of the final standing of the 2014 edition. All teams not seeded were drawn. Final standing of the 2014 edition are shown in brackets except the hosts who ranked 5th.

Pool A	Pool B	Pool C	Pool D
Chinese Taipei (Hosts)	Iran (1)	Qatar (2)	China (3)
Turkmenistan (10)	Philippines (7)	Iraq (6)	Kazakhstan (4)
Japan (13)	South Korea (–)	Thailand (–)	Vietnam (11)
Afghanistan (–)	Kuwait (–)	Australia (–)	Oman (12)

== Venues ==
- University of Taipei Gymnasium, Taipei, Taiwan – Pool A, B, E, F and Final eight
- Taipei Gymnasium, Taipei, Taiwan – Pool C, D, G, H, 13th–16th places and 9th–12th places

== Pool standing procedure ==
1. Number of matches won
2. Match points
3. Sets ratio
4. Points ratio
5. Result of the last match between the tied teams

Match won 3–0 or 3–1: 3 match points for the winner, 0 match points for the loser
Match won 3–2: 2 match points for the winner, 1 match point for the loser

== Preliminary round ==
- All times are Taiwan National Standard Time (UTC+08:00).

=== Pool A ===
Pos	Team	Pld	W	L	Pts	SW	SL	SR	SPW	SPL	SPR	Qualification
1	(Chinese Taipei) Taichung Bank	3	3	0	9	9	1	9.000	245	183	1.339	Pool E
2	(Turkmenistan) Migrasiya	3	2	1	5	7	5	1.400	260	251	1.036	Pool E
3	(Japan) Panasonic Panthers	3	1	2	4	5	6	0.833	239	218	1.096	Pool G
4	(Afghanistan) NDS	3	0	3	0	0	9	0.000	133	225	0.591	Pool G

Date	Time		Score		Set 1	Set 2	Set 3	Set 4	Set 5	Total	Report
13 Aug	11:00	Panasonic Panthers (Japan)	3–0	(Afghanistan) NDS	25–12	25–12	25–12			75–36	P2
13 Aug	19:00	Taichung Bank (Chinese Taipei)	3–1	(Turkmenistan) Migrasiya	20–25	25–19	25–19	25–15		95–78	P2
14 Aug	17:00	NDS (Afghanistan)	0–3	(Turkmenistan) Migrasiya	18–25	17–25	16–25			51–75	P2
14 Aug	19:00	Taichung Bank (Chinese Taipei)	3–0	(Japan) Panasonic Panthers	25–19	25–20	25–20			75–59	P2
15 Aug	17:00	Migrasiya (Turkmenistan)	3–2	(Japan) Panasonic Panthers	19–25	25–22	23–25	25–22	15–11	107–105	P2
15 Aug	19:45	Taichung Bank (Chinese Taipei)	3–0	(Afghanistan) NDS	25–20	25–10	25–16			75–46	P2

=== Pool B ===
Pos	Team	Pld	W	L	Pts	SW	SL	SR	SPW	SPL	SPR	Qualification
1	(Iran) Paykan Tehran	3	3	0	9	9	0	MAX	228	159	1.434	Pool F
2	(South Korea) Sangmu	3	2	1	6	6	3	2.000	210	180	1.167	Pool F
3	(Philippines) Cignal HD Spikers	3	1	2	3	3	6	0.500	197	219	0.900	Pool H
4	(Kuwait) Qadsia	3	0	3	0	0	9	0.000	147	226	0.650	Pool H

Date	Time		Score		Set 1	Set 2	Set 3	Set 4	Set 5	Total	Report
13 Aug	13:00	Qadsia (Kuwait)	0–3	(Iran) Paykan Tehran	12–25	11–25	19–25			42–75	P2
13 Aug	15:00	Cignal HD Spikers (Philippines)	0–3	(South Korea) Sangmu	24–26	18–25	21–25			63–76	P2
14 Aug	13:00	Qadsia (Kuwait)	0–3	(Philippines) Cignal HD Spikers	22–25	17–25	24–26			63–76	P2
14 Aug	15:00	Sangmu (South Korea)	0–3	(Iran) Paykan Tehran	17–25	22–25	20–25			59–75	P2
15 Aug	13:00	Cignal HD Spikers (Philippines)	0–3	(Iran) Paykan Tehran	18–25	14–25	26–28			58–78	P2
15 Aug	15:00	Sangmu (South Korea)	3–0	(Kuwait) Qadsia	25–15	25–12	25–15			75–42	P2

=== Pool C ===
Pos	Team	Pld	W	L	Pts	SW	SL	SR	SPW	SPL	SPR	Qualification
1	(Qatar) Al-Arabi	3	3	0	9	9	1	9.000	251	194	1.294	Pool E
2	(Iraq) Gas Al-Janoob	3	2	1	5	7	5	1.400	260	242	1.074	Pool E
3	(Thailand) Nakhon Ratchasima	3	1	2	4	5	6	0.833	232	233	0.996	Pool G
4	(Australia) Victorian Volleyball Academy	3	0	3	0	0	9	0.000	151	225	0.671	Pool G

Date	Time		Score		Set 1	Set 2	Set 3	Set 4	Set 5	Total	Report
13 Aug	11:00	Gas Al-Janoob (Iraq)	1–3	(Qatar) Al-Arabi	20–25	28–26	22–25	19–25		89–101	P2
13 Aug	19:30	Nakhon Ratchasima (Thailand)	3–0	(Australia) Victorian Volleyball Academy	25–18	25–23	25–21			75–62	P2
14 Aug	17:15	Victorian Volleyball Academy (Australia)	0–3	(Qatar) Al-Arabi	20–25	18–25	9–25			47–75	P2
14 Aug	19:00	Nakhon Ratchasima (Thailand)	2–3	(Iraq) Gas Al-Janoob	23–25	25–15	25–16	15–25	11–15	99–96	P2
15 Aug	17:45	Nakhon Ratchasima (Thailand)	0–3	(Qatar) Al-Arabi	21–25	18–25	19–25			58–75	P2
15 Aug	19:45	Gas Al-Janoob (Iraq)	3–0	(Australia) Victorian Volleyball Academy	25–12	25–17	25–13			75–42	P2

=== Pool D ===
Pos	Team	Pld	W	L	Pts	SW	SL	SR	SPW	SPL	SPR	Qualification
1	(Kazakhstan) Pavlodar	3	3	0	9	9	1	9.000	250	197	1.269	Pool F
2	(China) Beijing BAIC Motors	3	2	1	6	7	4	1.750	263	228	1.154	Pool F
3	(Vietnam) Trang An Ninh Binh	3	1	2	3	4	6	0.667	206	235	0.877	Pool H
4	(Oman) Sohar	3	0	3	0	0	9	0.000	166	225	0.738	Pool H

Date	Time		Score		Set 1	Set 2	Set 3	Set 4	Set 5	Total	Report
13 Aug	13:15	Trang An Ninh Binh (Vietnam)	0–3	(Kazakhstan) Pavlodar	21–25	17–25	19–25			57–75	P2
13 Aug	15:20	Beijing BAIC Motors (China)	3–0	(Oman) Sohar	25–18	25–17	25–19			75–54	P2
14 Aug	13:00	Pavlodar (Kazakhstan)	3–0	(Oman) Sohar	25–20	25–13	25–19			75–52	P2
14 Aug	15:00	Beijing BAIC Motors (China)	3–1	(Vietnam) Trang An Ninh Binh	25–18	25–13	25–27	25–16		100–74	P2
15 Aug	13:00	Sohar (Oman)	0–3	(Vietnam) Trang An Ninh Binh	20–25	20–25	20–25			60–75	P2
15 Aug	15:00	Beijing BAIC Motors (China)	1–3	(Kazakhstan) Pavlodar	25–23	25–27	17–25	21–25		88–100	P2

== Classification round ==
- All times are Taiwan National Standard Time (UTC+08:00).
- The results and the points of the matches between the same teams that were already played during the preliminary round shall be taken into account for the classification round.

=== Pool E ===
Pos	Team	Pld	W	L	Pts	SW	SL	SR	SPW	SPL	SPR	Qualification
1	(Chinese Taipei) Taichung Bank	3	3	0	8	9	3	3.000	279	227	1.229	Quarterfinals
2	(Qatar) Al-Arabi	3	2	1	7	8	4	2.000	275	237	1.160	Quarterfinals
3	(Iraq) Gas Al-Janoob	3	1	2	2	4	8	0.500	250	281	0.890	Quarterfinals
4	(Turkmenistan) Migrasiya	3	0	3	1	3	9	0.333	222	281	0.790	Quarterfinals

Date	Time		Score		Set 1	Set 2	Set 3	Set 4	Set 5	Total	Report
16 Aug	17:50	Al-Arabi (Qatar)	3–0	(Turkmenistan) Migrasiya	25–15	25–13	25–11			75–39	P2
16 Aug	19:00	Taichung Bank (Chinese Taipei)	3–0	(Iraq) Gas Al-Janoob	25–19	25–17	25–14			75–50	P2
17 Aug	17:55	Migrasiya (Turkmenistan)	2–3	(Iraq) Gas Al-Janoob	21–25	25–21	27–25	19–25	13–15	105–111	P2
17 Aug	20:50	Taichung Bank (Chinese Taipei)	3–2	(Qatar) Al-Arabi	25–18	22–25	22–25	25–20	15–11	109–99	P2

=== Pool F ===
Pos	Team	Pld	W	L	Pts	SW	SL	SR	SPW	SPL	SPR	Qualification
1	(Iran) Paykan Tehran	3	2	1	6	7	4	1.750	268	228	1.175	Quarterfinals
2	(Kazakhstan) Pavlodar	3	2	1	6	7	4	1.750	247	250	0.988	Quarterfinals
3	(China) Beijing BAIC Motors	3	2	1	6	7	5	1.400	283	278	1.018	Quarterfinals
4	(South Korea) Sangmu	3	0	3	0	1	9	0.111	206	248	0.831	Quarterfinals

Date	Time		Score		Set 1	Set 2	Set 3	Set 4	Set 5	Total	Report
16 Aug	13:00	Paykan Tehran (Iran)	1–3	(China) Beijing BAIC Motors	22–25	26–28	25–20	23–25		96–98	P2
16 Aug	15:40	Pavlodar (Kazakhstan)	3–0	(South Korea) Sangmu	25–23	25–18	26–24			76–65	P2
17 Aug	13:00	Sangmu (South Korea)	1–3	(China) Beijing BAIC Motors	18–25	25–21	15–25	24–26		82–97	P2
17 Aug	15:30	Paykan Tehran (Iran)	3–1	(Kazakhstan) Pavlodar	22–25	25–15	25–20	25–11		97–71	P2

=== Pool G ===
Pos	Team	Pld	W	L	Pts	SW	SL	SR	SPW	SPL	SPR	Qualification
1	(Thailand) Nakhon Ratchasima	3	3	0	9	9	1	9.000	249	191	1.304	9th–12th semifinals
2	(Japan) Panasonic Panthers	3	2	1	6	7	3	2.333	224	185	1.211	9th–12th semifinals
3	(Afghanistan) NDS	3	1	2	2	3	8	0.375	186	254	0.732	13th–16th semifinals
4	(Australia) Victorian Volleyball Academy	3	0	3	1	2	9	0.222	216	245	0.882	13th–16th semifinals

Date	Time		Score		Set 1	Set 2	Set 3	Set 4	Set 5	Total	Report
16 Aug	13:00	Panasonic Panthers (Japan)	3–0	(Australia) Victorian Volleyball Academy	25–18	25–17	25–18			75–53	P2
16 Aug	15:00	Nakhon Ratchasima (Thailand)	3–0	(Afghanistan) NDS	25–14	25–15	28–26			78–55	P2
17 Aug	13:00	NDS (Afghanistan)	3–2	(Australia) Victorian Volleyball Academy	25–18	11–25	25–21	19–25	15–12	95–101	P2
17 Aug	15:35	Panasonic Panthers (Japan)	1–3	(Thailand) Nakhon Ratchasima	15–25	25–21	15–25	19–25		74–96	P2

=== Pool H ===
Pos	Team	Pld	W	L	Pts	SW	SL	SR	SPW	SPL	SPR	Qualification
1	(Vietnam) Trang An Ninh Binh	3	3	0	9	9	1	9.000	249	204	1.221	9th–12th semifinals
2	(Philippines) Cignal HD Spikers	3	2	1	5	7	5	1.400	284	285	0.996	9th–12th semifinals
3	(Kuwait) Qadsia	3	1	2	3	3	7	0.429	215	236	0.911	13th–16th semifinals
4	(Oman) Sohar	3	0	3	1	3	9	0.333	268	291	0.921	13th–16th semifinals

Date	Time		Score		Set 1	Set 2	Set 3	Set 4	Set 5	Total	Report
16 Aug	17:00	Cignal HD Spikers (Philippines)	3–2	(Oman) Sohar	18–25	22–25	29–27	35–33	15–13	119–123	P2
16 Aug	20:00	Trang An Ninh Binh (Vietnam)	3–0	(Kuwait) Qadsia	25–15	25–17	25–23			75–55	P2
17 Aug	17:50	Qadsia (Kuwait)	3–1	(Oman) Sohar	25–16	25–22	22–25	25–22		97–85	P2
17 Aug	20:05	Cignal HD Spikers (Philippines)	1–3	(Vietnam) Trang An Ninh Binh	21–25	26–24	22–25	20–25		89–99	P2

== Final round ==
- All times are Taiwan National Standard Time (UTC+08:00).

=== 13th–16th places ===
13th–16th semifinals
19 August
(Afghanistan) NDS	2
(Oman) Sohar	3
19 August
(Kuwait) Qadsia	1
(Australia) Victorian	3

13th place match
20 August
(Oman) Sohar	3
(Australia) Victorian	1
15th place match
20 August
(Afghanistan) NDS	3
(Kuwait) Qadsia	0

==== 13th–16th semifinals ====
Date	Time		Score		Set 1	Set 2	Set 3	Set 4	Set 5	Total	Report
19 Aug	13:00	NDS (Afghanistan)	2–3	(Oman) Sohar	26–24	25–19	23–25	28–30	11–15	113–113	P2
19 Aug	15:45	Qadsia (Kuwait)	1–3	(Australia) Victorian Volleyball Academy	25–15	28–30	17–25	17–25		87–95	P2

==== 15th place match ====
Date	Time		Score		Set 1	Set 2	Set 3	Set 4	Set 5	Total	Report
20 Aug	13:00	NDS (Afghanistan)	3–0	(Kuwait) Qadsia	25–20	25–23	25–14			75–57	

==== 13th place match ====
Date	Time		Score		Set 1	Set 2	Set 3	Set 4	Set 5	Total	Report
20 Aug	15:00	Sohar (Oman)	3–1	(Australia) Victorian Volleyball Academy	27–25	25–19	22–25	25–17		99–86	

=== 9th–12th places ===
9th–12th semifinals
19 August
(Thailand) Nakhon R.	3
(Philippines) Cignal	0
19 August
(Vietnam) Ninh Bình	0
(Japan) Panasonic	3

9th place match
20 August
(Thailand) Nakhon R.	3
(Japan) Panasonic	1
11th place match
20 August
(Philippines) Cignal	0
(Vietnam) Ninh Bình	3

==== 9th–12th semifinals ====
Date	Time		Score		Set 1	Set 2	Set 3	Set 4	Set 5	Total	Report
19 Aug	18:00	Nakhon Ratchasima (Thailand)	3–0	(Philippines) Cignal HD Spikers	25–18	25–16	25–14			75–48	P2
19 Aug	19:45	Trang An Ninh Binh (Vietnam)	0–3	(Japan) Panasonic Panthers	13–25	23–25	28–30			64–80	P2

==== 11th place match ====
Date	Time		Score		Set 1	Set 2	Set 3	Set 4	Set 5	Total	Report
20 Aug	17:00	Cignal HD Spikers (Philippines)	0–3	(Vietnam) Trang An Ninh Binh	20–25	18–25	21–25			59–75	

==== 9th place match ====
Date	Time		Score		Set 1	Set 2	Set 3	Set 4	Set 5	Total	Report
20 Aug	19:00	Nakhon Ratchasima (Thailand)	3–1	(Japan) Panasonic Panthers	25–23	25–19	22–25	25–23		97–90	

=== Final eight ===
Quarterfinals
19 August
(Chinese Taipei) Taichung Bank	3
(South Korea) Sangmu	1
19 August
(Kazakhstan) Pavlodar	3
(Iraq) Gas Al-Janoob	1
19 August
(Iran) Paykan	3
(Turkmenistan) Migrasiya	0
19 August
(Qatar) Al-Arabi	3
(China) Beijing	0

Semifinals
20 August
(Chinese Taipei) Taichung Bank	3
(Kazakhstan) Pavlodar	0
20 August
(Iran) Paykan	0
(Qatar) Al-Arabi	3

Final
21 August
(Chinese Taipei) Taichung Bank	3
(Qatar) Al-Arabi	1
3rd place match
21 August
(Kazakhstan) Pavlodar	1
(Iran) Paykan	3

5th–8th semifinals
20 August
(South Korea) Sangmu	3
(Iraq) Gas Al-Janoob	1
20 August
(Turkmenistan) Migrasiya	0
(China) Beijing	3

5th place match
21 August
(South Korea) Sangmu	1
(China) Beijing	3
7th place match
21 August
(Iraq) Gas Al-Janoob	3
(Turkmenistan) Migrasiya	2

==== Quarterfinals ====
Date	Time		Score		Set 1	Set 2	Set 3	Set 4	Set 5	Total	Report
19 Aug	13:00	Paykan Tehran (Iran)	3–0	(Turkmenistan) Migrasiya	25–21	25–13	25–13			75–47	P2
19 Aug	15:00	Al-Arabi (Qatar)	3–0	(China) Beijing BAIC Motors	25–18	25–17	25–22			75–57	P2
19 Aug	17:00	Pavlodar (Kazakhstan)	3–1	(Iraq) Gas Al-Janoob	19–25	25–16	25–19	25–21		94–81	P2
19 Aug	19:35	Taichung Bank (Chinese Taipei)	3–1	(South Korea) Sangmu	25–18	25–19	26–28	25–17		101–82	P2

==== 5th–8th semifinals ====
Date	Time		Score		Set 1	Set 2	Set 3	Set 4	Set 5	Total	Report
20 Aug	13:00	Sangmu (South Korea)	3–1	(Iraq) Gas Al-Janoob	25–23	21–25	27–25	25–22		98–95	
20 Aug	15:00	Migrasiya (Turkmenistan)	0–3	(China) Beijing BAIC Motors	19–25	23–25	19–25			61–75	

==== Semifinals ====
Date	Time		Score		Set 1	Set 2	Set 3	Set 4	Set 5	Total	Report
20 Aug	17:00	Paykan Tehran (Iran)	0–3	(Qatar) Al-Arabi	23–25	21–25	15–25			59–75	
20 Aug	19:00	Taichung Bank (Chinese Taipei)	3–0	(Kazakhstan) Pavlodar	25–19	25–18	25–21			75–58	

==== 7th place match ====
Date	Time		Score		Set 1	Set 2	Set 3	Set 4	Set 5	Total	Report
21 Aug	11:00	Gas Al-Janoob (Iraq)	3–2	(Turkmenistan) Migrasiya	16–25	25–15	25–18	14–25	15–13	95–96	

==== 5th place match ====
Date	Time		Score		Set 1	Set 2	Set 3	Set 4	Set 5	Total	Report
21 Aug	13:00	Sangmu (South Korea)	1–3	(China) Beijing BAIC Motors	17–25	23–25	25–14	19–25		84–89	

==== 3rd place match ====
Date	Time		Score		Set 1	Set 2	Set 3	Set 4	Set 5	Total	Report
21 Aug	15:00	Pavlodar (Kazakhstan)	1–3	(Iran) Paykan Tehran	13–25	23–25	28–26	18–25		82–101	

==== Final ====
Date	Time		Score		Set 1	Set 2	Set 3	Set 4	Set 5	Total	Report
21 Aug	17:00	Taichung Bank (Chinese Taipei)	3–1	(Qatar) Al-Arabi	21–25	25–21	25–23	25–17		96–86	

== Final standing ==
Rank	Team
1st place, gold medalist(s)	(Chinese Taipei) Taichung Bank
2nd place, silver medalist(s)	(Qatar) Al-Arabi
3rd place, bronze medalist(s)	(Iran) Paykan Tehran
4	(Kazakhstan) Pavlodar
5	(China) Beijing BAIC Motors
6	(South Korea) Sangmu
7	(Iraq) Gas Al-Janoob
8	(Turkmenistan) Migrasiya
9	(Thailand) Nakhon Ratchasima
10	(Japan) Panasonic Panthers
11	(Vietnam) Trang An Ninh Binh
12	(Philippines) Cignal HD Spikers
13	(Oman) Sohar
14	(Australia) Victorian Volleyball Academy
15	(Afghanistan) NDS
16	(Kuwait) Qadsia

Qualified for the 2016 Club World Championship

2015 Asian Men's Club Champions

1st title

12–man Roster
Wu.T.H, Liu.H.J, Tai.J.C, Liu.H.M, Chang.L.H, Huang.C.F, Huang.C.C, Wang.M.C, Lin.Y.S, Huang.P.H, Chen.C.C (c), Chuang.S.C
Head coach
Chen.K.C

== Awards ==
- Most Valuable Player
  (Chinese Taipei) Huang Pei-Hung (Taichung Bank)
- Best Setter
  (Chinese Taipei) Huang Pei-Hung (Taichung Bank)
- Best Outside Spikers
  (Chinese Taipei) Chen Chien-Chen (Taichung Bank)
  (Chinese Taipei) Liu Hung-Min (Taichung Bank)
- Best Middle Blockers
  (Qatar) Ibrahim Ibrahim (Al Arabi)
  (Iran) Saeid Mostafavand (Paykan Tehran)
- Best Opposite Spiker
  (Cuba) Osmel Camejo (Al Arabi)
- Best Libero
  (Chinese Taipei) Lin Yung-Shun (Taichung Bank)

== See also ==
- List of sporting events in Taiwan
