= 2008 Asian Men's Club Volleyball Championship =

2008 Asian Club Championship
Tournament details
- Host country: Kazakhstan
- Dates: 17–22 July
- Teams: 8
- Venue: 1 (in 1 host city)

Final positions
- Champions: (Iran) Paykan Tehran (4th title)

Tournament awards
- MVP: (Kazakhstan) Marat Imangaliyev

The 2008 Asian Men's Club Volleyball Championship was the 9th staging of the AVC Club Championships. The tournament was held in Almaty, Kazakhstan.

== Pools composition ==
The teams are seeded based on their final ranking at the 2007 Asian Men's Club Volleyball Championship.

Pool A	Pool B
Kazakhstan (Host); Bahrain (4th); Japan; Kuwait	Iran (1st); ~~Qatar (3rd)~~ * China; United Arab Emirates; ~~Indonesia~~ *

* Withdrew, replaced by Kazakhstan B.

== Preliminary round ==
=== Pool A ===
Pos	Team	Pld	W	L	Pts	SW	SL	SR	SPW	SPL	SPR	Qualification
1	(Kazakhstan) Almaty	3	3	0	6	9	1	9.000	252	211	1.194	Semifinals
2	(Japan) Suntory Sunbirds	3	2	1	5	7	4	1.750	270	251	1.076	Semifinals
3	(Kuwait) Al-Arabi	3	1	2	4	4	6	0.667	229	240	0.954	
4	(Bahrain) Al-Najma	3	0	3	3	0	9	0.000	179	228	0.785	

Date	Time		Score		Set 1	Set 2	Set 3	Set 4	Set 5	Total
17 Jul	16:00	Al-Arabi (Kuwait)	1–3	(Japan) Suntory Sunbirds	19–25	25–20	15–25	31–33		90–103
17 Jul	19:00	Al-Najma (Bahrain)	0–3	(Kazakhstan) Almaty	19–25	20–25	19–25			58–75
18 Jul	16:00	Al-Najma (Bahrain)	0–3	(Kuwait) Al-Arabi	18–25	21–25	23–25			62–75
18 Jul	18:00	Almaty (Kazakhstan)	3–1	(Japan) Suntory Sunbirds	25–21	25–20	27–29	25–19		102–89
19 Jul	16:00	Suntory Sunbirds (Japan)	3–0	(Bahrain) Al-Najma	25–18	28–26	25–15			78–59
19 Jul	18:00	Al-Arabi (Kuwait)	0–3	(Kazakhstan) Almaty	23–25	19–25	22–25			64–75

=== Pool B ===
Pos	Team	Pld	W	L	Pts	SW	SL	SR	SPW	SPL	SPR	Qualification
1	(Iran) Paykan Tehran	3	3	0	6	9	1	9.000	249	180	1.383	Semifinals
2	(United Arab Emirates) Al-Nasr	3	2	1	5	6	3	2.000	208	191	1.089	Semifinals
3	(China) Henan Tianguan	3	1	2	4	4	6	0.667	233	237	0.983	
4	(Kazakhstan) Esil Petropavlovsk	3	0	3	3	0	9	0.000	143	225	0.636	

Date	Time		Score		Set 1	Set 2	Set 3	Set 4	Set 5	Total
17 Jul	11:00	Paykan Tehran (Iran)	3–1	(China) Henan Tianguan	24–26	25–23	25–15	25–20		99–84
17 Jul	14:00	Al-Nasr (United Arab Emirates)	3–0	(Kazakhstan) Esil Petropavlovsk	25–15	25–13	25–14			75–42
18 Jul	11:00	Henan Tianguan (China)	3–0	(Kazakhstan) Esil Petropavlovsk	25–17	25–18	25–21			75–56
18 Jul	14:00	Paykan Tehran (Iran)	3–0	(United Arab Emirates) Al-Nasr	25–18	25–19	25–14			75–51
19 Jul	11:00	Al-Nasr (United Arab Emirates)	3–0	(China) Henan Tianguan	25–22	32–30	25–22			82–74
19 Jul	14:00	Esil Petropavlovsk (Kazakhstan)	0–3	(Iran) Paykan Tehran	21–25	9–25	15–25			45–75

== Classification 5th–8th ==
5th–8th places
21 July – Almaty
(Kuwait) Al-Arabi	3
(Kazakhstan) Esil	1
21 July – Almaty
(China) Henan	3
(Bahrain) Al-Najma	1

5th place
22 July – Almaty
(Kuwait) Al-Arabi	1
(China) Henan	3
7th place
22 July – Almaty
(Kazakhstan) Esil	0
(Bahrain) Al-Najma	3

=== Semifinals ===
Date	Time		Score		Set 1	Set 2	Set 3	Set 4	Set 5	Total
21 Jul	11:00	Al-Arabi (Kuwait)	3–1	(Kazakhstan) Esil Petropavlovsk	23–25	25–20	25–22	25–18		98–85
21 Jul	14:00	Henan Tianguan (China)	3–1	(Bahrain) Al-Najma	25–23	25–17	23–25	25–21		98–86

=== 7th place ===
Date	Time		Score		Set 1	Set 2	Set 3	Set 4	Set 5	Total
22 Jul	11:00	Esil Petropavlovsk (Kazakhstan)	0–3	(Bahrain) Al-Najma	19–25	20–25	16–25			55–75

=== 5th place ===
Date	Time		Score		Set 1	Set 2	Set 3	Set 4	Set 5	Total
22 Jul	14:00	Al-Arabi (Kuwait)	1–3	(China) Henan Tianguan	19–25	22–25	25–23	24–26		90–99

== Final round ==
Semifinals
21 July – Almaty
(Kazakhstan) Almaty	3
(United Arab Emirates) Al-Nasr	2
21 July – Almaty
(Iran) Paykan	3
(Japan) Suntory	0

Final
22 July – Almaty
(Kazakhstan) Almaty	1
(Iran) Paykan	3
3rd place
22 July – Almaty
(United Arab Emirates) Al-Nasr	2
(Japan) Suntory	3

=== Semifinals ===
Date	Time		Score		Set 1	Set 2	Set 3	Set 4	Set 5	Total
21 Jul	16:00	Paykan Tehran (Iran)	3–0	(Japan) Suntory Sunbirds	25–20	25–20	25–15			75–55
21 Jul	18:00	Almaty (Kazakhstan)	3–2	(United Arab Emirates) Al-Nasr	23–25	25–20	25–19	25–27	15–10	113–101

=== 3rd place ===
Date	Time		Score		Set 1	Set 2	Set 3	Set 4	Set 5	Total
22 Jul	16:00	Al-Nasr (United Arab Emirates)	2–3	(Japan) Suntory Sunbirds	25–22	16–25	25–20	13–25	13–15	92–107

=== Final ===
Date	Time		Score		Set 1	Set 2	Set 3	Set 4	Set 5	Total
22 Jul	18:00	Almaty (Kazakhstan)	1–3	(Iran) Paykan Tehran	25–20	26–28	22–25	19–25		92–98

== Final standing ==
Rank	Team
1st place, gold medalist(s)	(Iran) Paykan Tehran
2nd place, silver medalist(s)	(Kazakhstan) Almaty
3rd place, bronze medalist(s)	(Japan) Suntory Sunbirds
4	(United Arab Emirates) Al-Nasr
5	(China) Henan Tianguan
6	(Kuwait) Al-Arabi
7	(Bahrain) Al-Najma
8	(Kazakhstan) Esil Petropavlovsk

== Awards ==
- MVP: (Kazakhstan) Marat Imangaliyev (Almaty)
- Best scorer: (Algeria) Hicham Guemmadi (Al-Nasr)
- Best server: (Algeria) Ali Kerboua (Al-Nasr)
- Best spiker: (Iran) Mohsen Andalib (Paykan)
- Best blocker: (Iran) Alireza Nadi (Paykan)
- Best receiver: (Kazakhstan) Dmitriy Gorbatkov (Almaty)
- Best setter: (Kazakhstan) Alexey Stepanov (Almaty)
- Best digger: (Japan) Kenji Sabato (Suntory)
