= Markus Steuerwald =

German volleyball player (born 1989)

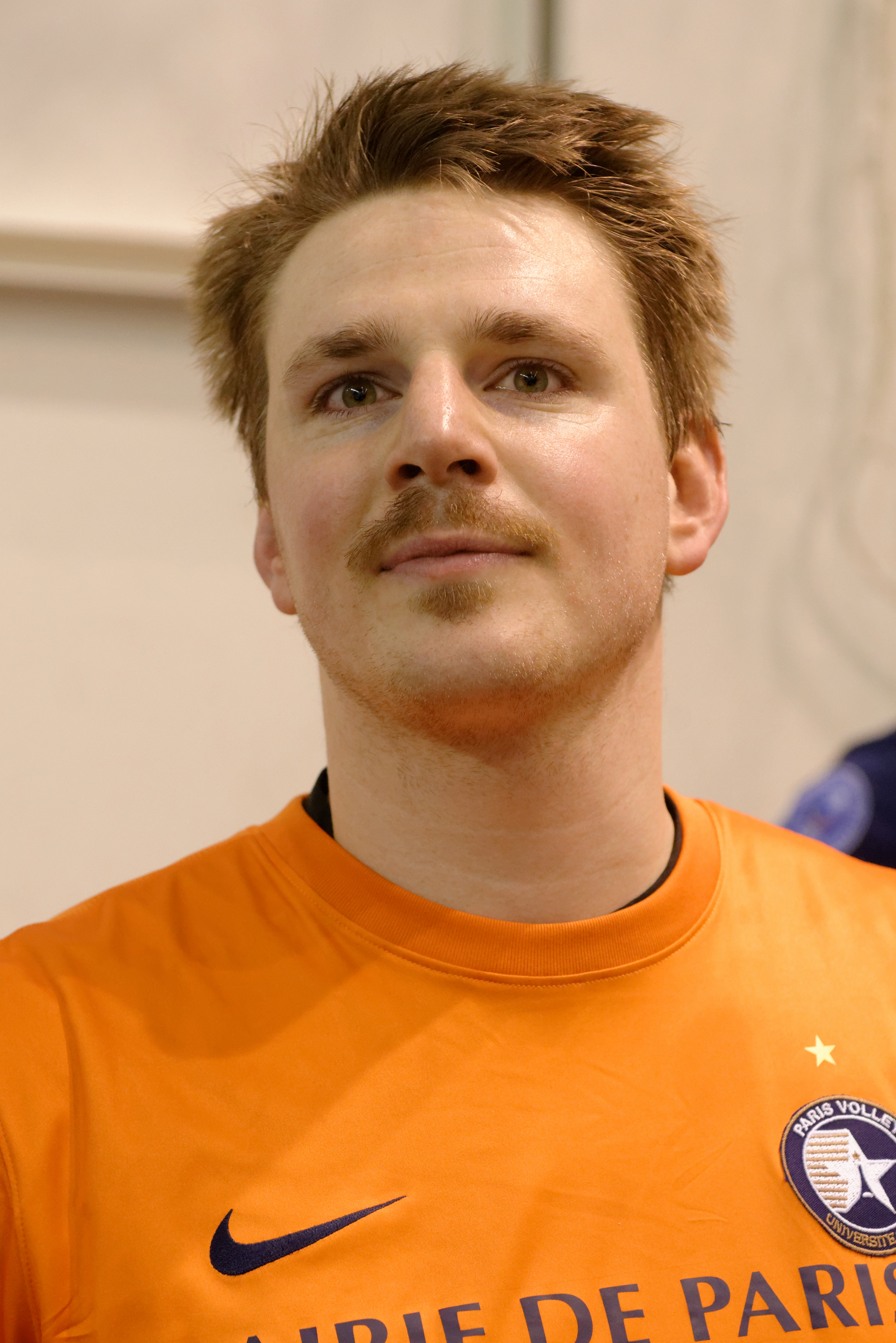

Personal information
- Nationality: German
- Born: 7 March 1989 (age 37); Wolfach, West Germany
- Height: 1.82 m (6 ft 0 in)

Volleyball information
- Position: Libero

Career
Years	Teams
2006–2010; 2010–2016; 2016–2021	VfB Friedrichshafen; Paris Volley; VfB Friedrichshafen

National team
Germany
Honours
Men's volleyball
Representing Germany
FIVB World Championship
Bronze medal – third place	2014 Poland

Markus Steuerwald (born 7 March 1989) is a German former professional volleyball player, a former member of the Germany national team, a participant at the Olympic Games London 2012, 2006–07 CEV Champions League winner, and a bronze medallist at the 2014 World Championship.

== Honours ==
=== Clubs ===
- CEV Champions League
  - 2006/2007 – with VfB Friedrichshafen
- CEV Cup
  - 2013/2014 – with Paris Volley
- National championships
  - 2006/2007 German Cup, with VfB Friedrichshafen
  - 2006/2007 German Championship, with VfB Friedrichshafen
  - 2007/2008 German Cup, with VfB Friedrichshafen
  - 2007/2008 German Championship, with VfB Friedrichshafen
  - 2008/2009 German Championship, with VfB Friedrichshafen
  - 2009/2010 German Championship, with VfB Friedrichshafen
  - 2013/2014 French SuperCup, with Paris Volley
  - 2015/2016 French Championship, with Paris Volley
  - 2016/2017 German SuperCup, with VfB Friedrichshafen
  - 2016/2017 German Cup, with VfB Friedrichshafen
  - 2017/2018 German SuperCup, with VfB Friedrichshafen
  - 2017/2018 German Cup, with VfB Friedrichshafen
  - 2018/2019 German SuperCup, with VfB Friedrichshafen
  - 2018/2019 German Cup, with VfB Friedrichshafen

=== Individual awards ===
- 2007: CEV Champions League – Best Libero
- 2007: CEV U19 European Championship – Best Server
- 2012: Olympic Games – Best Libero
