= 2016 FIVB Volleyball Men's Club World Championship =

2016 Men's Club World Championship
Tournament details
- Host country: Brazil
- Dates: 18–23 October
- Teams: 8 (from 4 confederations)
- Venue: 1 (in 1 host city)

Final positions
- Champions: (Brazil) Sada Cruzeiro (3rd title)

Tournament awards
- MVP: (Brazil) William Arjona (SDC)

Tournament statistics
- Matches played: 16
- Attendance: 41,286 (2,580 per match)

The 2016 FIVB Volleyball Men's Club World Championship was the 12th edition of the event. It was held in Betim, Brazil from 18 to 23 October 2016.

Brazil's Sada Cruzeiro defeated Russia's Zenit Kazan in the final and won FIVB Men's Club World Championship for the second time in a row and third on their history. Italy's Trentino Diatec claimed the bronze medal by defeating Argentina's Personal Bolívar in the third place match. William Arjona from Sada Cruzeiro was elected the Most Valuable Player.

== Qualification ==
Team (Confederation)	Qualified as
(Brazil) Minas Tênis Clube (CSV)	Hosts
(Egypt) Tala'ea El-Gaish (CAVB)	2016 African Champions
(Chinese Taipei) Taichung Bank (AVC)	2015 Asian Champions
(Russia) Zenit Kazan (CEV)	2016 European Champions
(Brazil) Sada Cruzeiro (CSV)	2016 South American Champions
(Italy) Trentino Diatec (CEV)	Wild Card
(Argentina) UPCN San Juan (CSV)	Wild Card
(Argentina) Personal Bolívar (CSV)	Wild Card

== Pools composition ==
Pool A	Pool B
(Brazil) Sada Cruzeiro	(Argentina) Personal Bolívar
(Chinese Taipei) Taichung Bank	(Argentina) UPCN San Juan
(Egypt) Tala'ea El-Gaish	(Italy) Trentino Diatec
(Russia) Zenit Kazan	(Brazil) Minas Tênis Clube

== Venue ==
All matches
Betim, Brazil
Ginásio Poliesportivo Divino Braga
Capacity: 6,000
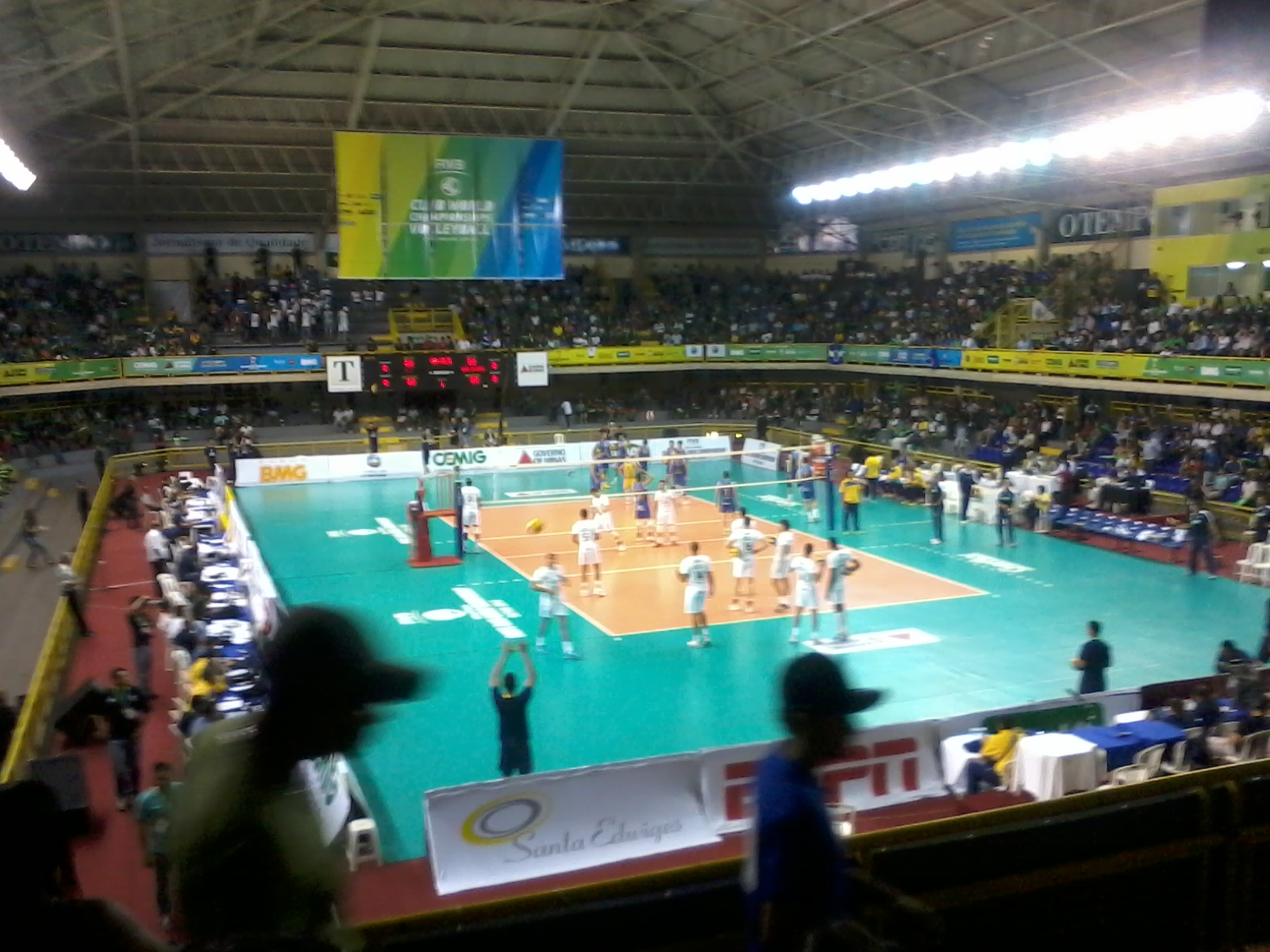

== Pool standing procedure ==
1. Number of matches won
2. Match points
3. Sets ratio
4. Points ratio
5. Result of the last match between the tied teams

Match won 3–0 or 3–1: 3 match points for the winner, 0 match points for the loser
Match won 3–2: 2 match points for the winner, 1 match point for the loser

== Preliminary round ==
- All times are Brasília Summer Time (UTC−02:00).

=== Pool A ===
Pos	Team	Pld	W	L	Pts	SW	SL	SR	SPW	SPL	SPR	Qualification
1	(Brazil) Sada Cruzeiro	3	3	0	9	9	1	9.000	246	181	1.359	Semifinals
2	(Russia) Zenit Kazan	3	2	1	6	7	3	2.333	239	199	1.201	Semifinals
3	(Chinese Taipei) Taichung Bank	3	1	2	3	3	7	0.429	192	232	0.828	
4	(Egypt) Tala'ea El-Gaish	3	0	3	0	1	9	0.111	183	248	0.738	

Date	Time		Score		Set 1	Set 2	Set 3	Set 4	Set 5	Total	Report
18 Oct	14:30	Zenit Kazan (Russia)	3–0	(Egypt) Tala'ea El-Gaish	25–14	25–19	25–15			75–48	P2 P3
18 Oct	19:30	Sada Cruzeiro (Brazil)	3–0	(Chinese Taipei) Taichung Bank	25–10	25–16	25–13			75–39	P2 P3
19 Oct	19:00	Sada Cruzeiro (Brazil)	3–0	(Egypt) Tala'ea El-Gaish	25–18	25–20	25–15			75–53	P2 P3
20 Oct	15:00	Tala'ea El-Gaish (Egypt)	1–3	(Chinese Taipei) Taichung Bank	25–23	20–25	14–25	23–25		82–98	P2 P3
20 Oct	20:00	Sada Cruzeiro (Brazil)	3–1	(Russia) Zenit Kazan	25–20	20–25	26–24	25–20		96–89	P2 P3
21 Oct	17:30	Zenit Kazan (Russia)	3–0	(Chinese Taipei) Taichung Bank	25–22	25–16	25–17			75–55	P2 P3

=== Pool B ===
Pos	Team	Pld	W	L	Pts	SW	SL	SR	SPW	SPL	SPR	Qualification
1	(Italy) Trentino Diatec	3	3	0	9	9	1	9.000	249	210	1.186	Semifinals
2	(Argentina) Personal Bolívar	3	2	1	6	7	5	1.400	284	292	0.973	Semifinals
3	(Argentina) UPCN San Juan	3	1	2	3	4	6	0.667	250	246	1.016	
4	(Brazil) Minas Tênis Clube	3	0	3	0	1	9	0.111	208	243	0.856	

Date	Time		Score		Set 1	Set 2	Set 3	Set 4	Set 5	Total	Report
18 Oct	17:00	Minas Tênis Clube (Brazil)	0–3	(Argentina) UPCN San Juan	22–25	18–25	18–25			58–75	P2 P3
19 Oct	14:00	Personal Bolívar (Argentina)	3–1	(Argentina) UPCN San Juan	33–31	22–25	30–28	27–25		112–109	P2 P3
19 Oct	16:45	Trentino Diatec (Italy)	3–0	(Brazil) Minas Tênis Clube	25–23	25–19	25–23			75–65	P2 P3
20 Oct	17:30	Trentino Diatec (Italy)	3–1	(Argentina) Personal Bolívar	25–18	23–25	25–17	25–19		98–79	P2 P3
21 Oct	15:00	Personal Bolívar (Argentina)	3–1	(Brazil) Minas Tênis Clube	18–25	25–19	25–19	25–22		93–85	P2 P3
21 Oct	20:00	UPCN San Juan (Argentina)	0–3	(Italy) Trentino Diatec	24–26	19–25	23–25			66–76	P2 P3

== Final round ==
- All times are Brasília Summer Time (UTC−02:00).

Semifinals
22 October
(Brazil) Sada	3
(Argentina) Bolívar	1
22 October
(Russia) Kazan	3
(Italy) Trentino	0

Final
23 October
(Brazil) Sada	3
(Russia) Kazan	0
3rd place match
23 October
(Argentina) Bolívar	2
(Italy) Trentino	3

=== Semifinals ===
Date	Time		Score		Set 1	Set 2	Set 3	Set 4	Set 5	Total	Report
22 Oct	15:00	Zenit Kazan (Russia)	3–0	(Italy) Trentino Diatec	25–18	25–23	25–18			75–59	P2 P3
22 Oct	18:00	Sada Cruzeiro (Brazil)	3–1	(Argentina) Personal Bolívar	21–25	25–15	25–15	25–19		96–74	P2 P3

=== 3rd place match ===
Date	Time		Score		Set 1	Set 2	Set 3	Set 4	Set 5	Total	Report
23 Oct	14:00	Personal Bolívar (Argentina)	2–3	(Italy) Trentino Diatec	22–25	25–23	23–25	31–29	15–17	116–119	P2 P3

=== Final ===
Date	Time		Score		Set 1	Set 2	Set 3	Set 4	Set 5	Total	Report
23 Oct	17:00	Sada Cruzeiro (Brazil)	3–0	(Russia) Zenit Kazan	25–21	25–23	25–15			75–59	P2 P3

== Final standing ==
Rank	Team
1st place, gold medalist(s)	(Brazil) Sada Cruzeiro
2nd place, silver medalist(s)	(Russia) Zenit Kazan
3rd place, bronze medalist(s)	(Italy) Trentino Diatec
4	(Argentina) Personal Bolívar
5	(Chinese Taipei) Taichung Bank
5	(Argentina) UPCN San Juan
7	(Brazil) Minas Tênis Clube
7	(Egypt) Tala'ea El-Gaish

2016 Men's Club World Champions

14–man roster
Éder Levi Kock, Leonardo Nascimento, Vanderson Malta, William Arjona (c), Evandro Guerra, Yoandy Leal, Robertlandy Simón, Rodrigo Leão, Isac Santos, Fernando Kreling, Pedro Luiz Santos, Sérgio Nogueira, Filipe Ferraz, Renan Buiatti
Head coach
Marcelo Méndez

== Awards ==
- Most valuable player
  (Brazil) William Arjona (Sada Cruzeiro)
- Best setter
  (Italy) Simone Giannelli (Trentino Diatec)
- Best outside spikers
  (Cuba) Yoandy Leal (Sada Cruzeiro)
  (Cuba) Wilfredo León (Zenit Kazan)
- Best middle blockers
  (Argentina) Pablo Crer (Personal Bolívar)
  (Russia) Artem Volvich (Zenit Kazan)
- Best opposite spiker
  (Brazil) Evandro Guerra (Sada Cruzeiro)
- Best libero
  (Brazil) Sérgio Nogueira (Sada Cruzeiro)

== See also ==
- 2016 FIVB Volleyball Women's Club World Championship
