= 2006–07 CEV Champions League =

- League: CEV Champions League
- Sport: Volleyball
- Duration: 27 September 2006 – 1 April 2007
- Number of teams: 24

Finals
- Venue: (Russia) Moscow
- Champions: (Germany) VfB Friedrichshafen
- Finals MVP: (Germany) Jochen Schöps

CEV Champions League seasons
- ← 2005–06 2007–08 →

The 2006–07 CEV Champions League was the 48th edition of the highest level European volleyball club competition organised by the European Volleyball Confederation.

== League round ==
=== Pool A ===
Pos	Team	Pld	W	L	Pts	SW	SL	SR	SPW	SPL	SPR	Qualification
1	(Spain) Pòrtol Drac Palma Mallorca	10	8	2	18	27	15	1.800	975	904	1.079	Playoffs
2	(France) Tours VB	10	7	3	17	24	16	1.500	920	818	1.125	Playoffs
3	(Russia) Lokomotiv Belgorod	10	6	4	16	22	18	1.222	788	856	0.921	Playoffs
4	(Montenegro) Budućnost Podgorička Banka	10	5	5	15	20	22	0.909	932	965	0.966	
5	(Germany) Evivo Düren	10	3	7	13	16	24	0.667	879	830	1.059	
6	(Austria) Hypo Tirol Innsbruck	10	1	9	11	13	27	0.481	833	854	0.975	

=== Pool B ===
Pos	Team	Pld	W	L	Pts	SW	SL	SR	SPW	SPL	SPR	Qualification
1	(Russia) Dynamo Moscow (Note: Qualified as hosts) (H)	10	9	1	19	27	12	2.250	907	802	1.131	Final Four
2	(Italy) Sisley Treviso	10	7	3	17	23	13	1.769	821	800	1.026	Playoffs
3	(Belgium) Noliko Maaseik	10	6	4	16	20	15	1.333	821	795	1.033	Playoffs
4	(Greece) Iraklis Thessaloniki	10	4	6	14	17	19	0.895	807	834	0.968	
5	(France) Paris Volley	10	4	6	14	16	21	0.762	856	828	1.034	
6	(Netherlands) Ortec Rotterdam Nesselande	10	0	10	10	7	30	0.233	803	916	0.877	

(H) Host

=== Pool C ===
Pos	Team	Pld	W	L	Pts	SW	SL	SR	SPW	SPL	SPR	Qualification
1	(Belgium) Knack Randstad Roeselare	10	9	1	19	29	12	2.417	960	886	1.084	Playoffs
2	(Italy) Lube Banca Marche Macerata	10	6	4	16	23	14	1.643	884	803	1.101	Playoffs
3	(Poland) BOT Skra Bełchatów	10	6	4	16	22	20	1.100	964	953	1.012	Playoffs
4	(Bulgaria) Levski Siconco Sofia	10	4	6	14	16	21	0.762	795	854	0.931	
5	(Greece) Olympiacos Piraeus	10	3	7	13	13	23	0.565	795	837	0.950	
6	(Austria) Hotvolleys Vienna	10	2	8	12	12	25	0.480	795	860	0.924	

=== Pool D ===
Pos	Team	Pld	W	L	Pts	SW	SL	SR	SPW	SPL	SPR	Qualification
1	(Germany) VfB Friedrichshafen	10	8	2	18	26	13	2.000	910	834	1.091	Playoffs
2	(Greece) Panathinaikos Athens	10	7	3	17	25	12	2.083	848	769	1.103	Playoffs
3	(Italy) Bre Banca Lannutti Cuneo	10	7	3	17	21	12	1.750	764	681	1.122	Playoffs
4	(Czech Republic) DHL Ostrava	10	5	5	15	21	22	0.955	910	934	0.974	Playoffs
5	(Serbia) Vojvodina Novolin Novi Sad	10	2	8	12	10	27	0.370	768	873	0.880	
6	(Spain) Numancia Soria	10	1	9	11	12	29	0.414	851	960	0.886	

== Playoffs ==
=== Playoff 12 ===
Team 1	Agg.	Team 2	1st leg	2nd leg	Setpoints
VfB Friedrichshafen (Germany)	5–3	(Belgium) Noliko Maaseik	3–0	2–3	
Bre Banca Lannutti Cuneo (Italy)	3–4	(Italy) Sisley Treviso	3–1	0–3	
Lube Banca Marche Macerata (Italy)	6–3	(Greece) Panathinaikos Athens	3–1	3–2	
Lokomotiv Belgorod (Russia)	3–6	(Belgium) Knack Randstad Roeselare	2–3	1–3	
Pòrtol Drac Palma Mallorca (Spain)	5–5	(Poland) BOT Skra Bełchatów	3–2	2–3	221–209
DHL Ostrava (Czech Republic)	2–6	(France) Tours VB	1–3	1–3	

==== First leg ====
Date	Time		Score		Set 1	Set 2	Set 3	Set 4	Set 5	Total
14 Feb	20:00	VfB Friedrichshafen (Germany)	3–0	(Belgium) Noliko Maaseik	25–20	25–23	33–31			83–74
14 Feb	20:30	Bre Banca Lannutti Cuneo (Italy)	3–1	(Italy) Sisley Treviso	20–25	27–25	28–26	25–18		100–94
13 Feb	20:30	Lube Banca Marche Macerata (Italy)	3–1	(Greece) Panathinaikos Athens	25–20	25–22	20–25	28–26		98–93
14 Feb	19:00	Lokomotiv Belgorod (Russia)	2–3	(Belgium) Knack Randstad Roeselare	16–25	25–22	19–25	25–20	13–15	98–107
15 Feb	20:30	Pòrtol Drac Palma Mallorca (Spain)	3–2	(Poland) BOT Skra Bełchatów	25–21	21–25	25–20	22–25	15–9	108–100
14 Feb	17:45	DHL Ostrava (Czech Republic)	1–3	(France) Tours VB	25–19	19–25	13–25	19–25		76–94

==== Second leg ====
Date	Time		Score		Set 1	Set 2	Set 3	Set 4	Set 5	Total
22 Feb	20:30	Noliko Maaseik (Belgium)	3–2	(Germany) VfB Friedrichshafen	22–25	25–14	25–20	25–27	15–13	112–99
20 Feb	20:30	Sisley Treviso (Italy)	3–0	(Italy) Bre Banca Lannutti Cuneo	25–19	25–22	25–23			75–64
20 Feb	18:00	Panathinaikos Athens (Greece)	2–3	(Italy) Lube Banca Marche Macerata	25–22	22–25	23–25	25–18	14–16	109–106
21 Feb	20:30	Knack Randstad Roeselare (Belgium)	3–1	(Russia) Lokomotiv Belgorod	25–16	32–30	40–42	25–14		122–102
21 Feb	18:00	BOT Skra Bełchatów (Poland)	3–2	(Spain) Pòrtol Drac Palma Mallorca	18–25	25–19	31–29	18–25	17–15	109–113
21 Feb	20:00	Tours VB (France)	3–1	(Czech Republic) DHL Ostrava	25–21	17–25	25–19	29–27		96–92

=== Playoff 6 ===
Team 1	Agg.	Team 2	1st leg	2nd leg
VfB Friedrichshafen (Germany)	5–3	(Italy) Sisley Treviso	3–0	2–3
Lube Banca Marche Macerata (Italy)	4–3	(Belgium) Knack Randstad Roeselare	3–0	1–3
Pòrtol Drac Palma Mallorca (Spain)	3–6	(France) Tours VB	1–3	2–3

==== First leg ====
Date	Time		Score		Set 1	Set 2	Set 3	Set 4	Set 5	Total
7 Mar	20:00	VfB Friedrichshafen (Germany)	3–0	(Italy) Sisley Treviso	25–20	25–21	25–21			75–62
6 Mar	20:30	Lube Banca Marche Macerata (Italy)	3–0	(Belgium) Knack Randstad Roeselare	25–20	25–21	25–20			75–61
8 Mar	20:30	Pòrtol Drac Palma Mallorca (Spain)	1–3	(France) Tours VB	16–25	25–17	18–25	21–25		80–92

==== Second leg ====
Date	Time		Score		Set 1	Set 2	Set 3	Set 4	Set 5	Total
13 Mar	20:30	Sisley Treviso (Italy)	3–2	(Germany) VfB Friedrichshafen	14–25	25–22	25–20	23–25	15–10	102–102
14 Mar	20:30	Knack Randstad Roeselare (Belgium)	3–1	(Italy) Lube Banca Marche Macerata	26–28	25–19	25–22	25–19		101–88
13 Mar	20:00	Tours VB (France)	3–2	(Spain) Pòrtol Drac Palma Mallorca	25–20	20–25	25–15	22–25	15–12	107–97

== Final Four ==
- Organizer: (Russia) Dynamo Moscow
- Place: Moscow

Semifinals
31 March
(France) Tours VB	3
(Russia) Dynamo Moscow	1
31 March
(Italy) Lube Banca Marche Macerata	2
(Germany) VfB Friedrichshafen	3

Final
1 April
(France) Tours VB	1
(Germany) VfB Friedrichshafen	3
3rd place match
1 April
(Russia) Dynamo Moscow	3
(Italy) Lube Banca Marche Macerata	0

=== Semifinals ===
Date	Time		Score		Set 1	Set 2	Set 3	Set 4	Set 5	Total
31 Mar	18:30	Tours VB (France)	3–1	(Russia) Dynamo Moscow	25–18	28–26	19–25	25–22		97–91
31 Mar	16:00	Lube Banca Marche Macerata (Italy)	2–3	(Germany) VfB Friedrichshafen	25–20	24–26	19–25	25–13	13–15	106–99

=== 3rd place match ===
Date	Time		Score		Set 1	Set 2	Set 3	Set 4	Set 5	Total
1 Apr	15:00	Dynamo Moscow (Russia)	3–0	(Italy) Lube Banca Marche Macerata	25–18	25–23	25–18			75–59

=== Final ===
Date	Time		Score		Set 1	Set 2	Set 3	Set 4	Set 5	Total
1 Apr	17:30	Tours VB (France)	1–3	(Germany) VfB Friedrichshafen	20–25	24–26	25–23	19–25		88–99

== Final standings ==
Rank	Team
1st place, gold medalist(s)	(Germany) VfB Friedrichshafen
2nd place, silver medalist(s)	(France) Tours VB
3rd place, bronze medalist(s)	(Russia) Dynamo Moscow
4	(Italy) Lube Banca Marche Macerata

2006–07 CEV Champions League winners
(Germany)
VfB Friedrichshafen
1st title

== Awards ==
- Most valuable player
  (Germany) Jochen Schöps (VfB Friedrichshafen)
- Best scorer
  (Algeria) Hichem Guemmadi (Tours VB)
- Best spiker
  (Italy) Alessandro Paparoni (Lube Banca Marche Macerata)
- Best server
  (Bulgaria) Matey Kaziyski (Dynamo Moscow)
- Best blocker
  (Russia) Aleksandr Volkov (Dynamo Moscow)
- Best receiver
  (Slovakia) Lukáš Diviš (VfB Friedrichshafen)
- Best libero
  (Germany) Markus Steuerwald (VfB Friedrichshafen)
- Best setter
  (France) Loïc De Kergret (Tours VB)
