= Turkmenistan Futsal Cup =

- Founded: 2018; 8 years ago
- Region: Turkmenistan
- Teams: 12
- Current champions: Migrasiya (1st title)
- Most championships: Denizchi Turkmenbashi (1 title)

The Turkmenistan Futsal Cup, is the top knockout tournament of Turkmenistan futsal and the second most important futsal competition in Turkmenistan after the Turkmenistan Futsal League. It is organized by the Football Federation of Turkmenistan and was established in the 2018 season.

== Cup Winners ==
- 2018: Denizchi Turkmenbashi
- 2019: Migrasiya Ashgabat

== Super Cup Winners ==
- 2019: Kopetdag Ashgabat

== See also ==
- AFC Futsal club championship
- Football Federation of Turkmenistan
- Turkmenistan national futsal team
- Turkmenistan Futsal League
