= Turkmenistan Futsal League =

Turkmenistan futsal league
- Country: Turkmenistan
- Confederation: AFC
- Divisions: 1
- Number of clubs: 6
- Level on pyramid: 1
- Domestic cup: Turkmenistan Futsal Cup
- International cup: AFC Futsal Club Championship
- Current champions: Köpetdag Aşgabat (2024)
- Broadcaster(s): Turkmenistan Sport
- Website: http://tff.com.tm/
- Current: 2024 Turkmenistan futsal league

The Turkmenistan Futsal League (turkm. Türkmenistanyň Naýbaşy Futzal Ligasy), is the top league for Futsal in Turkmenistan. The winning team obtains the participation right to the AFC Futsal Club Championship.

== Competition format ==
The Turkmenistan Futsal League 2021 features a total of 8 teams, who have been played each other in two rounds. The season runs from June to December 2021.

== Champions ==
- 2017: Talyp sport Ashgabat
- 2016: Ahal Änew
- 2015: Denizchi Turkmenbashi
- 2014: Galkan Ashgabat
- 2013: Arvana Ashgabat
- 2012: Galkan Ashgabat
- 2011: Arvana Ashgabat
- 2009–10: Arvana Ashgabat
- 2008–09: Fakel Ahal Änew
- 2007–08: Arvana Ashgabat
- 2006: Asudalyk Ashgabat
- 2005: Melik Ashgabat
- 2004: Turan Dashoguz

Season	1st place, gold medalist(s)	2nd place, silver medalist(s)	3rd place, bronze medalist(s)
2018	Migrasiya Ashgabat	Kopetdag Ashgabat	Denizchi Turkmenbashi
2019	Kopetdag Ashgabat	Talyp Sport Ashgabat	Denizchi Turkmenbashi
2020	Kopetdag Ashgabat	Senagatbank Ashgabat	Denizchi Turkmenbashi
2021	Denizchi Turkmenbashi	Kopetdag Ashgabat	Gumrukchi Ashgabat
2022	Denizchi Turkmenbashi	Kopetdag Ashgabat	Senagatbank Ashgabat
2023	Denizchi Turkmenbashi	Kopetdag Ashgabat	Gumrukchi Ashgabat
2024	Kopetdag Ashgabat	Senagatbank Ashgabat	Denizchi Turkmenbashi
2025	Kopetdag Ashgabat	Denizchi Turkmenbashi	Ahal

== See also ==
- AFC Futsal club championship
- Football Federation of Turkmenistan
- Turkmenistan national futsal team
- Turkmenistan Futsal Cup
