= Hichem Guemmadi =

Algerian volleyball player (born 1976)

Personal information
- Full name: Hichem Guemmadi
- Nationality: Algeria
- Born: April 16, 1976 (age 50) Constantine, Algeria
- Home town: Dubai, UAE
- Height: 1.94 m (6 ft 4 1/2 in)
- Weight: 82 kg (181 lb)
- Spike: 341 cm (134 in)
- Block: 324 cm (128 in)

Volleyball information
- Position: Wing Spiker
- Current club: (United Arab Emirates) Al-Nasr Dubaï
- Number: 15

National team
- Years: Team
- 1993 -: Algeria
- Updated on June 2010

Hichem Guemmadi (born April 16, 1976) is an Algerian international volleyball player.

Representing with his home team at the 1998 World Championship, his team finished in 19th place.

He participated in the 2006 and 2008 Arab Nations Championship with the Algeria men's national volleyball team.

With the professional Club Tours Volley-Ball, he won the 2004–05 CEV Champions League. At the 2006–07 CEV Champions League season, his team finished as runner-up, losing the final game to German team VfB Friedrichshafen. He also took home the Best Scorer award.

== Clubs ==
- (Algeria) NC Béjaïa (1994–1996)
- (Algeria) Annaba HVB 1996-1999)
- (France) Chaumont Volley-Ball 52 (1999–2000)
- (France) AS Cannes (2000–2002)
- (France) Tours Volley-Ball (2002–2007)
- (United Arab Emirates) Al-Nasr Dubaï (2007–2009)

== Awards ==
=== Individuals ===
- 2009 Asian Men's Club Championship "Most Valuable Player"
- 2008 Asian Men's Club Championship "Best Scorer"
- 2006–07 CEV Champions League "Best Scorer"

=== Clubs ===
- 2003 France Cup - Champion, with Tours Volley-Ball
- 2004 France Championship - Champion, with Tours Volley-Ball
- 2004 France Supercup - Runner-Up, with Tours Volley-Ball
- 2004–05 CEV Champions League - Champion, with Tours Volley-Ball
- 2005 France Supercup - Champion, with Tours Volley-Ball
- 2005 France Cup - Champion, with Tours Volley-Ball
- 2006 France Championship - Runner-Up, with Tours Volley-Ball
- 2006 France Supercup - Runner-Up, with Tours Volley-Ball
- 2006 France Cup - Champion, with Tours Volley-Ball
- 2006–07 CEV Champions League - Runner-Up, with Tours Volley-Ball
