= Taichung Bank Club =

Taichung Bank
- Manager: M: (Taiwan) Chen Ke-chou; W: (Taiwan) Lo Chung-jen

The Taichung Bank Club is a Taiwanese volleyball club. They have represented Chinese Taipei in international club volleyball competitions.

Their men's team has won the 2015 Asian Men's Club Volleyball Championship without losing a single match, beating Qatari club Al-Arabi in the final, thus qualifying for the 2016 FIVB Volleyball Men's Club World Championship.

They participated at the 2016 Asian Women's Club Volleyball Championship under the name "T. Grand".

== Roster ==
2016 Asian Women's Club Volleyball Championship

Head coach: (Taiwan) Lo Chung-jen

No.	Name	Date of birth	Height	Weight	Spike	Block
1	(Taiwan) Cheng Tzu-yun	9 April 1999	1.69 m (5 ft 7 in)	61 kg (134 lb)	285 cm (112 in)	276 cm (109 in)
2	(Taiwan) Liu Shuang-ling	2 February 2000	1.77 m (5 ft 10 in)	68 kg (150 lb)	295 cm (116 in)	285 cm (112 in)
3	(Taiwan) Huang Ching-hsuan	16 November 1998	1.80 m (5 ft 11 in)	64 kg (141 lb)	305 cm (120 in)	300 cm (120 in)
4	(Taiwan) Wen Yi-chin	21 January 2001	1.75 m (5 ft 9 in)	68 kg (150 lb)	290 cm (110 in)	282 cm (111 in)
6	(Taiwan) Chang Jia-ling	29 September 1999	1.77 m (5 ft 10 in)	73 kg (161 lb)	300 cm (120 in)	292 cm (115 in)
7	(Taiwan) Liu Yu-chun	10 May 2000	1.72 m (5 ft 8 in)	62 kg (137 lb)	280 cm (110 in)	273 cm (107 in)
8	(Taiwan) Liao Ying-chun	28 January 1999	1.74 m (5 ft 9 in)	59 kg (130 lb)	288 cm (113 in)	281 cm (111 in)
9	(Taiwan) Chen Jia-man	27 July 1999	1.67 m (5 ft 6 in)	57 kg (126 lb)	273 cm (107 in)	270 cm (110 in)
10	(Taiwan) Chen Yu-chieh	13 November 2000	1.72 m (5 ft 8 in)	55 kg (121 lb)	295 cm (116 in)	288 cm (113 in)
11	(Taiwan) Chiu Ya-hui (C)	4 April 1998	1.80 m (5 ft 11 in)	64 kg (141 lb)	300 cm (120 in)	290 cm (110 in)
12	(Taiwan) Tsai Qin-yao	20 September 1998	1.76 m (5 ft 9 in)	71 kg (157 lb)	290 cm (110 in)	283 cm (111 in)
13	(Taiwan) Liu Kuei-ling	28 January 1998	1.60 m (5 ft 3 in)	56 kg (123 lb)	275 cm (108 in)	285 cm (112 in)
14	(Taiwan) Huang Man-ya	10 October 1999	1.78 m (5 ft 10 in)	56 kg (123 lb)	291 cm (115 in)	278 cm (109 in)
15	(Taiwan) Wang Yu-han	3 September 2000	1.76 m (5 ft 9 in)	66 kg (146 lb)	292 cm (115 in)	285 cm (112 in)
17	(Taiwan) Huang Chen-yu	26 February 1998	1.75 m (5 ft 9 in)	56 kg (123 lb)	300 cm (120 in)	290 cm (110 in)
18	(Taiwan) Wu Sin-yu	6 February 2000	1.56 m (5 ft 1 in)	53 kg (117 lb)	265 cm (104 in)	258 cm (102 in)
19	(Taiwan) Lee Yun-shiou	11 June 2000	1.70 m (5 ft 7 in)	60 kg (130 lb)	270 cm (110 in)	255 cm (100 in)

== Honors ==
Asian Men's Club Volleyball Championship

- Champions: 2015
