= 2014 Asian Men's Club Volleyball Championship =

2014 Asian Club Championship

Tournament details
- Host country: Philippines
- Dates: 8–16 April
- Teams: 16
- Venues: 2 (in 1 host city)

Final positions
- Champions: (Iran) Matin Varamin (1st title)

Tournament awards
- MVP: (Iran) Shahram Mahmoudi

The 2014 Asian Men's Club Volleyball Championship, also known as the PLDT HOME Fibr 2014 Asian Men's Club Volleyball Championship due to sponsorship reasons, was the 15th staging of the AVC Club Championships. The tournament was supposed to be held in Vietnam but later withdrew from hosting. The tournament was instead held in Pasay, Philippines from 8 to 16 April 2014. The champions qualified for the 2014 and 2015 Club World Championship as Asia's representative.

== Venues ==
- Mall of Asia Arena, Pasay, Philippines – Pool A, B and Final Round
- Cuneta Astrodome, Pasay, Philippines – Pool C, D and Classification 9th–16th

== Pools composition ==
The teams are seeded based on their final ranking at the 2013 Asian Men's Club Volleyball Championship. The draw took place on February 14 at the Grand Ballroom of the New World Hotel in Makati.

Pool A	Pool B	Pool C	Pool D
Philippines (Host); Iraq (7th); ~~Kuwait~~ * Mongolia	Iran (1st); Japan (6th); Lebanon; Vietnam	Qatar (2nd); Kazakhstan (5th); Oman; Hong Kong; Turkmenistan	Chinese Taipei (3rd); China (4th); United Arab Emirates; ~~India~~ * Papua New Guinea

* Withdrew

== Preliminary round ==
=== Pool A ===
Pos	Team	Pld	W	L	Pts	SW	SL	SR	SPW	SPL	SPR	Qualification
1	(Iraq) Gas Al-Janoob	2	2	0	6	6	1	6.000	173	128	1.352	Quarterfinals
2	(Philippines) PLDT HOME TVolution	2	1	1	3	3	3	1.000	134	127	1.055	Quarterfinals
3	(Mongolia) Altain Bars	2	0	2	0	1	6	0.167	121	173	0.699	

Date	Time		Score		Set 1	Set 2	Set 3	Set 4	Set 5	Total	Report
08 Apr	14:00	PLDT HOME TVolution (Philippines)	3–0	(Mongolia) Altain Bars	25–13	25–23	25–16			75–52	Report
10 Apr	12:00	PLDT HOME TVolution (Philippines)	0–3	(Iraq) Gas Al-Janoob	22–25	19–25	18–25			59–75	Report
12 Apr	12:00	Gas Al-Janoob (Iraq)	3–1	(Mongolia) Altain Bars	25–12	25–17	23–25	25–15		98–69	Report

=== Pool B ===
Pos	Team	Pld	W	L	Pts	SW	SL	SR	SPW	SPL	SPR	Qualification
1	(Iran) Matin Varamin	3	3	0	9	9	2	4.500	271	206	1.316	Quarterfinals
2	(Lebanon) Al-Zahra Al-Mina	3	2	1	4	7	7	1.000	303	307	0.987	Quarterfinals
3	(Japan) Oita Miyoshi Weisse Adler	3	1	2	4	6	7	0.857	282	304	0.928	
4	(Vietnam) Đức Long Gia Lai	3	0	3	1	3	9	0.333	241	280	0.861	

Date	Time		Score		Set 1	Set 2	Set 3	Set 4	Set 5	Total	Report
08 Apr	16:00	Đức Long Gia Lai (Vietnam)	2–3	(Lebanon) Al-Zahra Al-Mina	25–20	20–25	25–22	18–25	13–15	101–107	Report
09 Apr	12:00	Matin Varamin (Iran)	3–1	(Japan) Oita Miyoshi Weisse Adler	25–18	21–25	25–13	25–22		96–78	Report
10 Apr	14:00	Al-Zahra Al-Mina (Lebanon)	3–2	(Japan) Oita Miyoshi Weisse Adler	25–22	28–30	23–25	25–23	15–6	116–106	Report
10 Apr	16:00	Đức Long Gia Lai (Vietnam)	0–3	(Iran) Matin Varamin	17–25	16–25	15–25			48–75	Report
11 Apr	12:00	Oita Miyoshi Weisse Adler (Japan)	3–1	(Vietnam) Đức Long Gia Lai	25–22	22–25	26–24	25–21		98–92	Report
12 Apr	14:00	Matin Varamin (Iran)	3–1	(Lebanon) Al-Zahra Al-Mina	25–16	25–20	25–27	25–17		100–80	Report

=== Pool C ===
Pos	Team	Pld	W	L	Pts	SW	SL	SR	SPW	SPL	SPR	Qualification
1	(Qatar) Al-Rayyan	4	4	0	12	12	1	12.000	320	254	1.260	Quarterfinals
2	(Kazakhstan) Kondensat-Zhaikmunay	4	3	1	9	9	4	2.250	312	261	1.195	Quarterfinals
3	(Turkmenistan) Migrasiya	4	2	2	6	8	8	1.000	368	368	1.000	
4	(Oman) Sohar	4	1	3	3	4	10	0.400	274	319	0.859	
5	(Hong Kong) Green Dragon	4	0	4	0	2	12	0.167	268	340	0.788	

Date	Time		Score		Set 1	Set 2	Set 3	Set 4	Set 5	Total	Report
08 Apr	14:00	Migrasiya (Turkmenistan)	1–3	(Qatar) Al-Rayyan	23–25	20–25	25–19	16–25		84–94	Report
08 Apr	16:00	Kondensat-Zhaikmunay (Kazakhstan)	3–0	(Hong Kong) Green Dragon	25–16	25–17	25–20			75–53	Report
09 Apr	14:00	Sohar (Oman)	3–1	(Hong Kong) Green Dragon	14–25	25–14	25–12	25–20		89–71	Report
09 Apr	16:00	Migrasiya (Turkmenistan)	1–3	(Kazakhstan) Kondensat-Zhaikmunay	17–25	25–23	21–25	22–25		85–98	Report
10 Apr	14:00	Al-Rayyan (Qatar)	3–0	(Kazakhstan) Kondensat-Zhaikmunay	26–24	25–22	25–18			76–64	Report
10 Apr	16:00	Sohar (Oman)	1–3	(Turkmenistan) Migrasiya	25–23	18–25	22–25	17–25		82–98	Report
11 Apr	14:00	Green Dragon (Hong Kong)	1–3	(Turkmenistan) Migrasiya	21–25	22–25	28–26	23–25		94–101	Report
11 Apr	16:00	Al-Rayyan (Qatar)	3–0	(Oman) Sohar	25–19	25–23	25–14			75–56	Report
12 Apr	14:00	Kondensat-Zhaikmunay (Kazakhstan)	3–0	(Oman) Sohar	25–13	25–16	25–18			75–47	Report
12 Apr	16:00	Green Dragon (Hong Kong)	0–3	(Qatar) Al-Rayyan	17–25	11–25	22–25			50–75	Report

=== Pool D ===
Pos	Team	Pld	W	L	Pts	SW	SL	SR	SPW	SPL	SPR	Qualification
1	(China) Beijing BAIC Motor	3	3	0	9	9	1	9.000	248	200	1.240	Quarterfinals
2	(Chinese Taipei) Taipei City	3	2	1	6	7	4	1.750	256	209	1.225	Quarterfinals
3	(United Arab Emirates) Al-Nasr	3	1	2	3	4	6	0.667	220	227	0.969	
4	(Papua New Guinea) Amoa NCD	3	0	3	0	0	9	0.000	137	225	0.609	

Date	Time		Score		Set 1	Set 2	Set 3	Set 4	Set 5	Total	Report
08 Apr	18:00	Amoa NCD (Papua New Guinea)	0–3	(Chinese Taipei) Taipei City	12–25	14–25	7–25			33–75	Report
09 Apr	16:00	Beijing BAIC Motor (China)	3–1	(Chinese Taipei) Taipei City	20–25	25–18	25–23	25–21		95–87	Report
09 Apr	18:00	Al-Nasr (United Arab Emirates)	3–0	(Papua New Guinea) Amoa NCD	25–17	25–22	25–16			75–55	Report
10 Apr	18:00	Beijing BAIC Motor (China)	3–0	(United Arab Emirates) Al-Nasr	25–22	28–26	25–16			78–64	Report
11 Apr	18:00	Taipei City (Chinese Taipei)	3–1	(United Arab Emirates) Al-Nasr	19–25	25–18	25–15	25–23		94–81	Report
12 Apr	18:00	Amoa NCD (Papua New Guinea)	0–3	(China) Beijing BAIC Motor	12–25	17–25	20–25			49–75	Report

== Classification 9th–16th ==
9th–16th places
13 April – Pasay
(Mongolia) Altain Bars	1
(Vietnam) Đức Long Gia Lai	3
13 April – Pasay
(Turkmenistan) Migrasiya	3
(Papua New Guinea) Amoa NCD	0
13 April – Pasay
(Japan) Oita Miyoshi	2
(Oman) Sohar	3
13 April – Pasay
(United Arab Emirates) Al-Nasr	3
(Hong Kong) Green Dragon	0

9th–12th places
14 April – Pasay
(Vietnam) Đức Long Gia Lai	1
(Turkmenistan) Migrasiya	3
14 April – Pasay
(Oman) Sohar	0
(United Arab Emirates) Al-Nasr	3

9th place
15 April – Pasay
(Turkmenistan) Migrasiya	0
(United Arab Emirates) Al-Nasr	3
11th place
15 April – Pasay
(Vietnam) Đức Long Gia Lai	3
(Oman) Sohar	0

13th–16th places
14 April – Pasay
(Mongolia) Altain Bars	2
(Papua New Guinea) Amoa NCD	3
14 April – Pasay
(Japan) Oita Miyoshi	3
(Hong Kong) Green Dragon	0

13th place
15 April – Pasay
(Papua New Guinea) Amoa NCD	1
(Japan) Oita Miyoshi	3
15th place
15 April – Pasay
(Mongolia) Altain Bars	1
(Hong Kong) Green Dragon	3

=== Quarterfinals ===
Date	Time		Score		Set 1	Set 2	Set 3	Set 4	Set 5	Total	Report
13 Apr	12:00	Altain Bars (Mongolia)	1–3	(Vietnam) Đức Long Gia Lai	20–25	25–20	20–25	23–25		88–95	Report
13 Apr	14:00	Oita Miyoshi Weisse Adler (Japan)	2–3	(Oman) Sohar	25–17	25–23	22–25	26–28	7–15	105–108	Report
13 Apr	16:00	Migrasiya (Turkmenistan)	3–0	(Papua New Guinea) Amoa NCD	25–22	25–19	26–24			76–65	Report
13 Apr	18:00	Al-Nasr (United Arab Emirates)	3–0	(Hong Kong) Green Dragon	25–21	25–13	25–18			75–52	Report

=== 13th–16th semifinals ===
Date	Time		Score		Set 1	Set 2	Set 3	Set 4	Set 5	Total	Report
14 Apr	12:00	Altain Bars (Mongolia)	2–3	(Papua New Guinea) Amoa NCD	25–19	25–22	20–25	20–25	10–15	100–106	Report
14 Apr	14:00	Oita Miyoshi Weisse Adler (Japan)	3–0	(Hong Kong) Green Dragon	25–23	25–19	25–22			75–64	Report

=== 9th–12th semifinals ===
Date	Time		Score		Set 1	Set 2	Set 3	Set 4	Set 5	Total	Report
14 Apr	16:00	Đức Long Gia Lai (Vietnam)	1–3	(Turkmenistan) Migrasiya	20–25	26–24	19–25	22–25		87–99	Report
14 Apr	18:00	Sohar (Oman)	0–3	(United Arab Emirates) Al-Nasr	18–25	18–25	15–25			51–75	Report

=== 15th place ===
Date	Time		Score		Set 1	Set 2	Set 3	Set 4	Set 5	Total	Report
15 Apr	12:00	Altain Bars (Mongolia)	1–3	(Hong Kong) Green Dragon	23–25	16–25	25–23	17–25		81–98	Report

=== 13th place ===
Date	Time		Score		Set 1	Set 2	Set 3	Set 4	Set 5	Total	Report
15 Apr	14:00	Amoa NCD (Papua New Guinea)	1–3	(Japan) Oita Miyoshi Weisse Adler	21–25	25–22	20–25	15–25		81–97	Report

=== 11th place ===
Date	Time		Score		Set 1	Set 2	Set 3	Set 4	Set 5	Total	Report
15 Apr	16:00	Đức Long Gia Lai (Vietnam)	3–0	(Oman) Sohar	25–18	25–12	25–22			75–52	Report

=== 9th place ===
Date	Time		Score		Set 1	Set 2	Set 3	Set 4	Set 5	Total	Report
15 Apr	18:00	Migrasiya (Turkmenistan)	0–3	(United Arab Emirates) Al-Nasr	22–25	20–25	19–25			61–75	Report

== Final round ==
Quarterfinals
14 April – Pasay
(Iraq) Gas Al-Janoob	0
(Kazakhstan) Kondensat	3
14 April – Pasay
(Qatar) Al-Rayyan	3
(Philippines) PLDT	0
14 April – Pasay
(Iran) Matin	3
(Chinese Taipei) Taipei City	1
14 April – Pasay
(China) Beijing	3
(Lebanon) Al-Zahra	1

Semifinals
15 April – Pasay
(Kazakhstan) Kondensat	0
(Qatar) Al-Rayyan	3
15 April – Pasay
(Iran) Matin	3
(China) Beijing	0

Final
16 April – Pasay
(Qatar) Al-Rayyan	1
(Iran) Matin	3
3rd place
16 April – Pasay
(Kazakhstan) Kondensat	0
(China) Beijing	3

5th–8th places
15 April – Pasay
(Iraq) Gas Al-Janoob	3
(Philippines) PLDT	0
15 April – Pasay
(Chinese Taipei) Taipei City	3
(Lebanon) Al-Zahra	0

5th place
16 April – Pasay
(Iraq) Gas Al-Janoob	0
(Chinese Taipei) Taipei City	3
7th place
16 April – Pasay
(Philippines) PLDT	3
(Lebanon) Al-Zahra	2

=== Quarterfinals ===
Date	Time		Score		Set 1	Set 2	Set 3	Set 4	Set 5	Total	Report
14 Apr	12:00	Gas Al-Janoob (Iraq)	0–3	(Kazakhstan) Kondensat-Zhaikmunay	21–25	16–25	20–25			57–75	Report
14 Apr	14:00	Matin Varamin (Iran)	3–1	(Chinese Taipei) Taipei City	24–26	25–21	27–25	25–22		101–94	Report
14 Apr	16:00	Al-Rayyan (Qatar)	3–0	(Philippines) PLDT HOME TVolution	25–17	25–14	25–21			75–52	Report
14 Apr	18:00	Beijing BAIC Motor (China)	3–1	(Lebanon) Al-Zahra Al-Mina	23–25	25–12	25–22	25–16		98–75	Report

=== 5th–8th semifinals ===
Date	Time		Score		Set 1	Set 2	Set 3	Set 4	Set 5	Total	Report
15 Apr	12:00	Gas Al-Janoob (Iraq)	3–0	(Philippines) PLDT HOME TVolution	25–17	25–21	25–21			75–59	Report
15 Apr	14:00	Taipei City (Chinese Taipei)	3–0	(Lebanon) Al-Zahra Al-Mina	25–12	25–23	25–17			75–52	Report

=== Semifinals ===
Date	Time		Score		Set 1	Set 2	Set 3	Set 4	Set 5	Total	Report
15 Apr	16:00	Kondensat-Zhaikmunay (Kazakhstan)	0–3	(Qatar) Al-Rayyan	22–25	22–25	19–25			63–75	Report
15 Apr	18:00	Matin Varamin (Iran)	3–0	(China) Beijing BAIC Motor	27–25	25–23	25–20			77–68	Report

=== 7th place ===
Date	Time		Score		Set 1	Set 2	Set 3	Set 4	Set 5	Total	Report
16 Apr	10:00	PLDT HOME TVolution (Philippines)	3–2	(Lebanon) Al-Zahra Al-Mina	25–19	26–24	13–25	21–25	15–13	100–106	Report

=== 5th place ===
Date	Time		Score		Set 1	Set 2	Set 3	Set 4	Set 5	Total	Report
16 Apr	12:00	Gas Al-Janoob (Iraq)	0–3	(Chinese Taipei) Taipei City	22–25	18–25	19–25			59–75	Report

=== 3rd place ===
Date	Time		Score		Set 1	Set 2	Set 3	Set 4	Set 5	Total	Report
16 Apr	14:00	Kondensat-Zhaikmunay (Kazakhstan)	0–3	(China) Beijing BAIC Motor	17–25	14–25	20–25			51–75	Report

=== Final ===
Date	Time		Score		Set 1	Set 2	Set 3	Set 4	Set 5	Total	Report
16 Apr	16:00	Al-Rayyan (Qatar)	1–3	(Iran) Matin Varamin	25–19	17–25	24–26	16–25		82–95	Report

== Final standing ==
Rank	Team
1st place, gold medalist(s)	(Iran) Matin Varamin
2nd place, silver medalist(s)	(Qatar) Al-Rayyan
3rd place, bronze medalist(s)	(China) Beijing BAIC Motor
4	(Kazakhstan) Kondensat-Zhaikmunay
5	(Chinese Taipei) Taipei City
6	(Iraq) Gas Al-Janoob
7	(Philippines) PLDT HOME TVolution
8	(Lebanon) Al-Zahra Al-Mina
9	(United Arab Emirates) Al-Nasr
10	(Turkmenistan) Migrasiya
11	(Vietnam) Đức Long Gia Lai
12	(Oman) Sohar
13	(Japan) Oita Miyoshi Weisse Adler
14	(Papua New Guinea) Amoa NCD
15	(Hong Kong) Green Dragon
16	(Mongolia) Altain Bars

Qualified for the 2014 and 2015 Club World Championship

2014 Asian Men's Club Champions

1st title

== Awards ==
- MVP: (Iran) Shahram Mahmoudi (Matin)
- Best setter: (China) Li Runming (Beijing)
- Best outside spikers: (Kazakhstan) Maxim Samarin (Kondensat) and (Italy) Cristian Savani (Al-Rayyan)
- Best middle blockers: (Iran) Mohammad Mousavi (Matin) and (Iran) Mostafa Sharifat (Matin)
- Best opposite spiker: (Kazakhstan) Vitaliy Vorivodin (Kondensat)
- Best libero: (Qatar) Sulaiman Saeed (Al-Rayyan)
