= Turkmenistan national futsal team =

Turkmenistan
- Association: Football Federation of Turkmenistan
- Confederation: AFC (Asia)
- Head coach: Ýakup Öwezow
- Captain: Abdylla Gurbannepesow
- FIFA code: TKM
- FIFA ranking: 69 ▼1 (12 December 2025)
Home colours	Away colours

First international
- Thailand 23 – 2 Turkmenistan (Ho Chi Minh City, Vietnam, May 23, 2005)

Biggest win
- Turkmenistan 8 – 0 Maldives (Kuantan, Malaysia, April 18, 2006)

Biggest defeat
- Thailand 23 – 2 Turkmenistan (Ho Chi Minh City, Vietnam, May 23, 2005)

FIFA World Cup
- Appearances: none

AFC Futsal Championship
- Appearances: 7 (First in 2005)
- Best result: Round 1, 6 times

Asian Indoor and Martial Arts Games
- Appearances: 3 (First in 2009)
- Best result: 4th Place (2009)

The Turkmenistan national futsal team represents Turkmenistan in international futsal competitions and is controlled by the Football Federation of Turkmenistan.

== Overview ==
The team avoided preliminary qualification for the 2008 AFC Futsal Championship. They made the last direct spot in the finals despite finishing bottom of their finals group in 2007. Turkmenistan caused the first real upset of the championship with a 1–0 win over Australia in their opening game, Elman Tagayev scoring the only goal in the first half. After this came a 1–7 loss to Kyrgyzstan and a 2–5 reversal to Korea Republic. Turkmenistan was not expected to make it out of the group after poor performances in previous championships. The team performed poorly in 2005, and in the following year they had little chance in a group that included Iran and Thailand.

In March 2019, the Football Federation of Turkmenistan named Robert Grdović as the head coach of the Turkmenistan national futsal team, signing a one-year contract.

== Tournament records ==
=== FIFA Futsal World Cup ===
- 1989 – Part of Soviet Union
- 1992 – Did not enter
- 1996 – Did not enter
- 2000 – Did not enter
- 2004 – Did not enter
- 2008 – Did not qualify
- 2012 – Did not qualify
- 2016 – Did not qualify
- 2021 – Did not qualify
- 2024 – Withdrew

=== AFC Futsal Asian Cup ===
AFC Futsal Asian Cup									Qualification							
Year	Round	M	W	D	L	GF	GA	GD	M	W	D	L	GF	GA	GD	Link
(Malaysia) 1999	Did not enter															
(Thailand) 2000	Did not enter															
(Iran) 2001	Did not enter															
(Indonesia) 2002	Withdrew															
(Iran) 2003	Withdrew															
(Macau) 2004	Did not enter															
(Vietnam) 2005	Round 1	6	3	0	3	28	53	-25								
(Uzbekistan) 2006	Round 1	3	1	0	2	11	25	-14								
(Japan) 2007	Round 1	3	1	0	2	4	12	-8								
(Thailand) 2008	Round 1	3	1	0	2	8	9	-1								
(Uzbekistan) 2010	Round 1	3	0	0	3	5	12	-7								
(United Arab Emirates) 2012	Round 1	3	0	0	3	3	10	-7								
(Vietnam) 2014	Did not qualify															
(Uzbekistan) 2016	Did not qualify															
(Taiwan) 2018	Did not qualify															
(Turkmenistan) 2020	Cancelled															
(Kuwait) 2022	Round 1	3	0	1	2	9	20	-11								
(Thailand) 2024	Withdrew															
(Indonesia) 2026	Did not qualify															
Total	7/18	24	6	1	17	68	141	-73								

=== Futsal at the Asian Indoor and Martial Arts Games ===
- 2005 - Did not enter
- 2007 - Did not enter
- 2009 - 4th Place
- 2013 - Round 1
- 2017 - Quarterfinals (host)

== Squad ==
Squad for the 2020 AFC Futsal Championship qualification

1. Mulkaman Annagulyýew
2. Myrat Annaýew
3. Watan Ataýew
4. Meretgeldi Baýramow
5. Dayanç Garadjaýew
6. Abdylla Gurbannepesow
7. Allamyrat Gurbanow
8. Allaberdi Meredow
9. Öwezbaý Muhammetmyradow
10. Maksat Myradow
11. Serdar Rejepow
12. Berdymyrat Sapardurdyýew
13. Arzuwguly Sapargulyýew
14. Gurbangeldi Sähedow

=== Manager history ===
As of 14 January 2022

Name	Period
(Croatia) Robert Grdović	2019–2020
(Turkmenistan) Guwanç Kanaýew	2020–2022
(Turkmenistan) Ýakup Öwezow	2023–

== See also ==
- Turkmenistan national football team
