= Migrasiya =

Migrasiýa
- Full name: Migrasiýa woleýbol topary
- Chairman: (Turkmenistan) Aman Toylyyev
- Manager: (Turkmenistan) Serdar Tachnazarov
- League: Turkmenistan Volleyball Championship

Migrasiýa is a men's volleyball team based in Ashgabat, Turkmenistan. Club of State Migration Service of Turkmenistan. It played in Turkmenistan Volleyball Championship. It represented Turkmenistan at the 2012, 2014 and 2015 Asian Men's Club Volleyball Championship. Migrasiýa means "migration" in Turkmen.

== Honours ==
Turkmenistan Championship

- Champion (1): 2013
