= United Arab Emirates Volleyball Association =

Sports governing body in the UAE

- Sport: Volleyball; Beach volleyball
- Jurisdiction: United Arab Emirates
- Abbreviation: UAEVBA
- Founded: 1976
- Affiliation: FIVB
- Affiliation date: 1976
- Headquarters: Dubai
- Location: United Arab Emirates

Official website
- m.uaevba.ae
- (United Arab Emirates)

The United Arab Emirates Volleyball Association (UAEVBA) (Arabic: الأتحاد الاماراتي للكرة الطائرة), is the governing body for Volleyball in the United Arab Emirates since 1976.

== History ==
The United Arab Emirates Volleyball Association has been recognised by FIVB from 1976 and is a member of the Asian Volleyball Confederation and the Arab Volleyball Association. The Federation organizes all domestic volleyball competitions for men and women as well it rules over Beach Volleyball activities in the country for both genders.
