= Radostin Stoychev =

Bulgarian volleyball player and coach

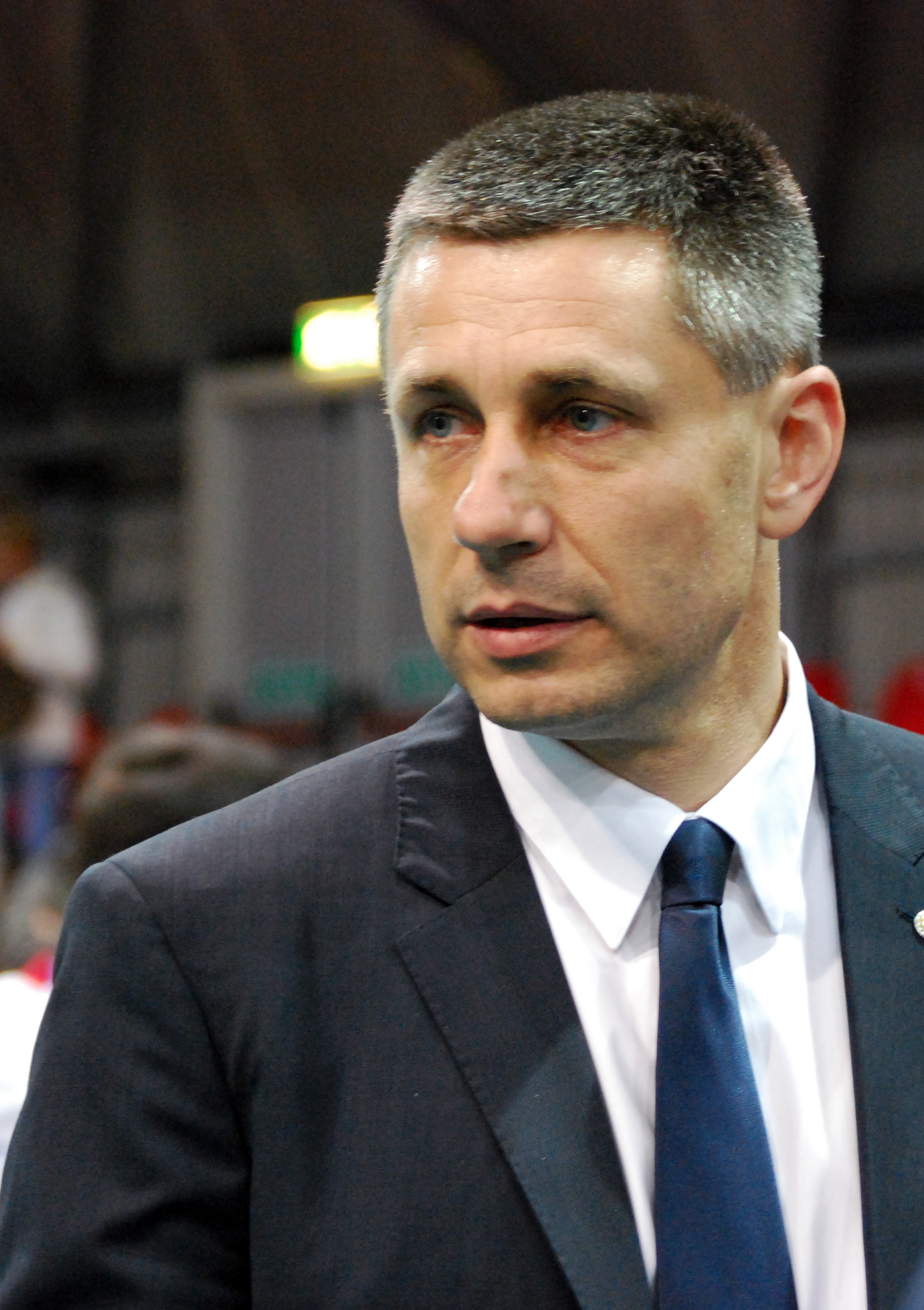

Personal information
- Full name: Radostin Stoychev
- Nationality: Bulgarian
- Born: September 25, 1969 (age 57); Sofia, Bulgaria
- Height: 1.88 m (6 ft 2 in)

Coaching information
Previous teams coached
Years	Teams
2003–2005; 2005–2007; 2007–2013; 2010–2012; 2013–2014; 2014–2016; 2017–2018; 2019–2025	Slavia Sofia; VC Dynamo Moscow (assistant); Itas Diatec Trentino; Bulgaria; Halkbank Ankara; Trentino Volley; Modena Volley; Verona Volley

Volleyball information
- Position: Setter

Career
Years	Teams
1988–1990; 1990–1991; 1991–1992; 1992–1992; 1992–1993; 1993–1994; 1994–1995; 1995–1996; 1996–1997; 1997–1998; 1999–2000; 2000–2001	VC CSKA Sofia; Georesurs Buhovo; Benfica Lisboa; VC CSKA Sofia; Slavia Sofia; San Lucar; Balkan Car; Neftohimik Burgas; Aon hotVolleys Vienna; Smederevo Volley; Chaumont VB; Tours VB

National team
Bulgaria
- Last updated: 14 March 2025

Radostin Svetoslavov Stoychev (Bulgarian: Радостин Светославов Стойчев;) (born September 25, 1969) is a former Bulgarian volleyball player and head coach.

== Personal life ==
Radostin Stoychev was born in the Bulgarian capital Sofia into the family of volleyball coach Svetoslav Stoychev, whose achievements include a world championship title with the junior Bulgarian national team.

He owns a restaurant chain and several laundries, and also holds a volleyball academy for children in Bulgaria together with Matey Kaziyski.

== Career as player ==
As a player, Radostin Stoychev represented CSKA Sofia, Minyor Buhovo (with whom he won the national title) as well as teams from Portugal, Spain, Austria, Serbia and France (Tours VB). He played as a setter.

== Career as coach ==
Stoychev's managerial career began at Slavia Sofia, whom he coached from 2003 to 2005, winning the Bulgarian Volleyball Cup in 2003. From 2005 to 2007, Stoychev was with VC Dynamo Moscow as their assistant manager. In Russia, he won the national championship in 2006 and the national cup in 2007.

In 2007, Stoychev was appointed the manager of Trento-based Italian Volleyball League team Trentino Volley. Stoychev attracted several of Bulgaria's top volleyball players to the club, such as Matey Kaziyski, Vladimir Nikolov, Smilen Mlyakov. In his debut 2007–08 season, he won the Italian national championship, an achievement comparable to the feats of Julio Velasco and Paulo Roberto de Freitas. In the following 2008–09 season, Trentino Volley's first season in the CEV Champions League, Stoychev led the club to the title in Europe's premier volleyball competition. The Bulgarian coach would sit on the bench of Trentino Volley until 2013. Stoychev in the season 2010–11 with Trentino won the FIVB Club World Championship, CEV Champions League and the Italian Scudetto. In 2011, Radostin Stoychev replaced Silvano Prandi and became head coach of the Bulgarian national team. He was released from his duties in May 2012, following a 1:3 loss against Germany during one of the qualification tournaments for the 2012 Summer Olympics. Nevertheless, Stoychev was reinstated as head coach a few days later following a heavily publicized media cross-fire between him, also supported by several of the team's star players, and the Bulgarian Volleyball Federation's Administration, which prompted the personal involvement of Boyko Borisov himself, the then Prime Minister of Bulgaria, in order to resolve the critical situation. Stoychev succeeded in qualifying the team for the 2012 London Olympics on his second attempt, but subsequently decided to step down due to a conflict of interest with the Bulgarian Volleyball Federation. Stoychev in three consecutive years named Best coach of the year in Bulgaria 2010, 2011 and 2012.

In the season 2012 he won the FIVB Club World Championship with Trentino club. In 2013 year he moved to Turkiah club Halkbank Ankara. He brought the Super league, SuperCup and cup champions. Stoychev returned to Italy in the next season, again on the bench of Trentino Volley, winning the Italian Championship and losing the final of the 2015–16 CEV Champions League.

== Achievements ==
- 2005 Bulgarian Cup, with Slavia Sofia
- 2006 Russian Cup, with VC Dynamo Moscow
- 2006 Russian Championship - with VC Dynamo Moscow
- 2009 CEV Champions League - with Itas Diatec Trentino
- 2009 Italian Championship, with Itas Diatec Trentino
- 2009 FIVB Club World Championship - with Itas Diatec Trentino
- 2010 CEV Champions League - with Itas Diatec Trentino
- 2010 Italian Cup Serie A, with Itas Diatec Trentino
- 2010 Italian Championship, with Itas Diatec Trentino
- 2010 FIVB Club World Championship - with Itas Diatec Trentino
- 2011 CEV Champions League - with Itas Diates Trentino
- 2011 Italian Championship, with Itas Diatec Trentino
- 2011 FIVB Club World Championship - with Itas Diatec Trentino
- 2012 CEV Champions League - with Itas Diatec Trentino
- 2012 Italian Cup Serie A, with Itas Diatec Trentino
- 2012 Italian Championship, with Itas Diatec Trentino
- 2012 FIVB Club World Championship - with Itas Diatec Trentino
- 2013 Italian Cup Serie A, with Itas Diatec Trentino
- 2013 Italian Championship, with Itas Diatec Trentino
- 2014 Turkish SuperCup 2013, with Halkbank Ankara
- 2014 Turkish Cup, with Halkbank Ankara
- 2014 Turkish Championship, with Halkbank Ankara
- 2015 Italian Cup Serie A, with Trentino Volley
- 2015 Italian Championship, with Trentino Volley
- 2016 CEV Champions League - with Trentino Diatec

== Individual awards ==
- 2010 - Best coach of the year in Bulgaria 56.23%
- 2011 - Costa-Aderlini Award for Best coach of the Serie A1
- 2011 - Panchina D.o.c. Award the Triveneto
- 2011 - Best coach of the year in Bulgaria 62.81%
- 2012 - Best coach of the year in Bulgaria 49.49%
- 2012 - Best coach of the year in Italy
- 2015 - Costa-Aderlini Award for Best coach of the Serie A1
