= Emanuele Birarelli =

Italian volleyball player (born 1981)

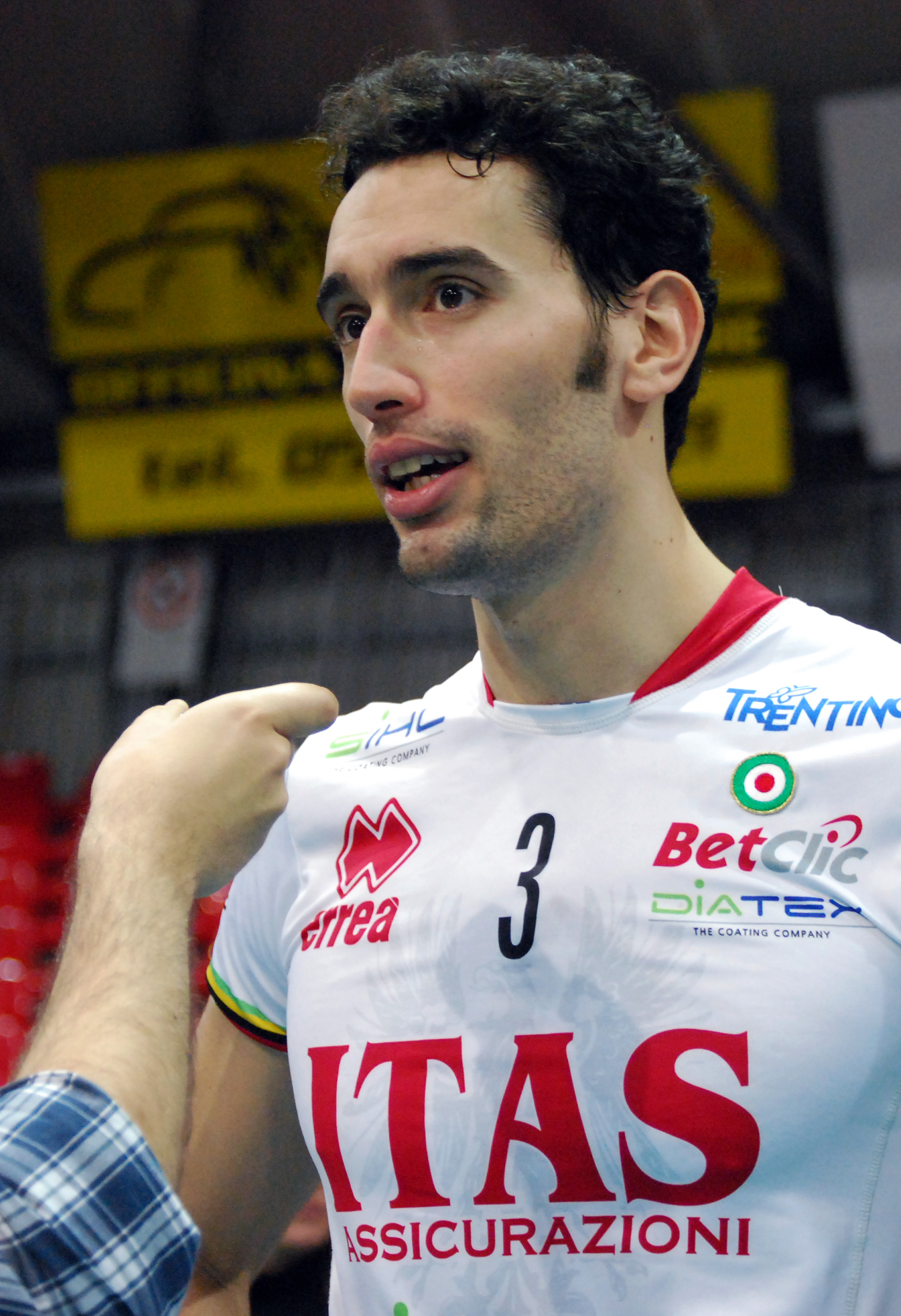

Personal information
- Born: 8 February 1981 (age 45); Senigallia, Italy
- Height: 2.02 m (6 ft 8 in)
- Weight: 95 kg (209 lb)
- Spike: 340 cm (134 in)
- Block: 316 cm (124 in)

Volleyball information
- Position: Middle blocker
- Current team: Sir Safety Perugia
- Number: 18

Career
Years	Teams
1995–1999	Pallavolo Falconara
1999–2000	Bottega Colbordolo
2000–2002	Pallavolo Falconara
2002–2003	Dorica Pallavolo Ancona
2005–2006	Pineto Volley
2006–2007	BluVolley Verona
2007–2015	Itas Diatec Trentino
2015–2016	Sir Safety Perugia

National team
2008–2016	Italy
Honours
Men's volleyball
Representing Italy
Olympic Games
Olympic Games
Silver medal – second place	2016 Rio de Janeiro	Team
Bronze medal – third place	2012 London	Team
European Championship
Silver medal – second place	2011 Austria/Czech Republic
Silver medal – second place	2013 Denmark/Poland
World League
Bronze medal – third place	2013 Mar del Plata
Bronze medal – third place	2014 Florence

Emanuele Birarelli (born 8 February 1981) is an Italian volleyball player, a member of Italy men's national volleyball team and Italian club Sir Safety Perugia, silver medalist of 2016 Summer Olympics, bronze medalist of 2012 Summer Olympics and participant of the Olympic Games 2008 Summer Olympics, World League (2013, 2014) and silver medalist of European Championship (2011, 2013).

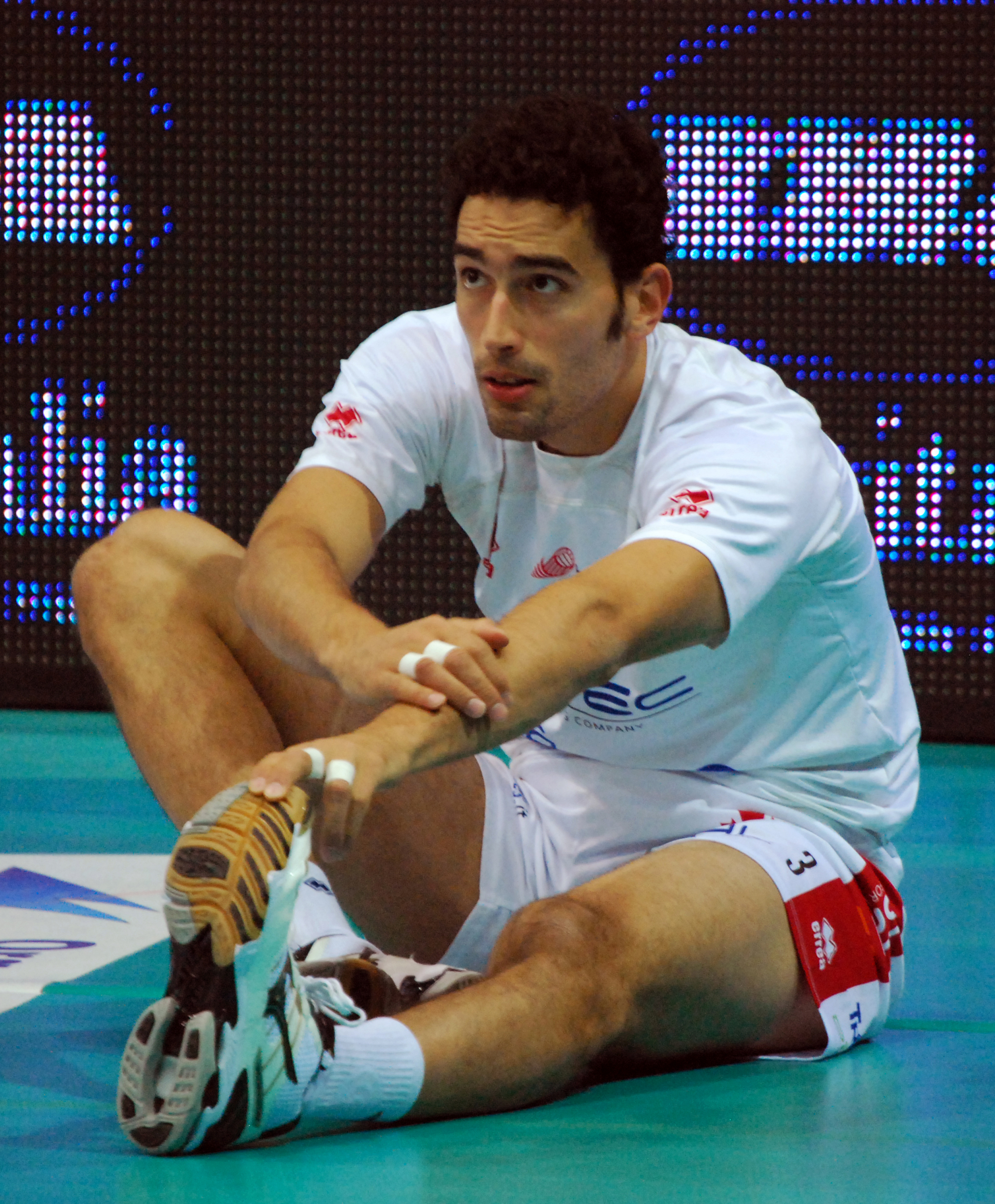
Birarelli during the match with Copra Elior Piacenza on 2 October 2011

== Career ==
Birarelli was born at Senigallia. He debuted in the Italian top championship in 1998 for Pallavolo Falconara. He remained there until 2003, when he was diagnosed an arm ischemia which forced him away from the field for two years.

He returned to play volleyball in 2005, first at Pineto, then for Verona and, from 2007, for Trentino Volley, with which he won an Italian national title in 2008. In the same year he debuted for Italy's national team. In 2009, he won the CEV Champions League with Trentino Volley, a feat he repeated the following year. He achieved bronze medal at the 2012 Summer Olympics. In 2015, he left Trentino Volley after eight seasons and went to another Italian club Sir Safety Perugia. He was a member of the Italy at the 2016 Summer Olympics and won silver medal after lost finale against Brazil. Birarelli received individual award for the Best Middle Blocker.

After retirement from the sports, he turned into volleyball agent to seek talent young players.

== Sporting achievements ==
=== CEV Champions League ===
- 2008/2009 - with Itas Diates Trentino
- 2009/2010 - with Itas Diates Trentino
- 2010/2011 - with Itas Diates Trentino
- 2011/2012 - with Itas Diates Trentino
- 2016/2017 - with Sir Sicoma Colussi Perugia

=== FIVB Club World Championship ===
- Qatar 2009 - with Itas Diates Trentino
- Qatar 2010 - with Itas Diates Trentino
- Qatar 2011 - with Itas Diates Trentino
- Qatar 2012 - with Itas Diates Trentino

=== National championship ===
- 2007/2008 Italian Championship, with Itas Diates Trentino
- 2008/2009 Italian Championship, with Itas Diates Trentino
- 2009/2010 Italian Cup Serie A, with Itas Diates Trentino
- 2009/2010 Italian Championship, with Itas Diates Trentino
- 2010/2011 Italian Championship, with Itas Diates Trentino
- 2011/2012 Italian Cup Serie A, with Itas Diates Trentino
- 2011/2012 Italian Championship, with Itas Diates Trentino
- 2012/2013 Italian Cup Serie A, with Itas Diates Trentino
- 2012/2013 Italian Championship, with Itas Diates Trentino
- 2014/2015 Italian Championship, with Trentino Volley

=== National team ===
- 2011 CEV European Championship
- 2012 Olympic Games
- 2013 FIVB World League
- 2013 CEV European Championship
- 2014 FIVB World League
- 2016 Olympic Games

=== Individual ===
- 2012 FIVB Club World Championship - Best Blocker
- 2013 FIVB World League - Best Middle Blocker
- 2013 FIVB Club World Championship - Best Middle Blocker
- 2013 FIVB World Grand Champions Cup - Best Middle Blocker
- 2016 Olympic Games - Best Middle Blocker

Awards
Preceded by (Poland) Marcin Możdżonek	Best Middle Blocker of FIVB World League; 2013 ex aequo (Russia) Dmitriy Muserskiy	Succeeded by (United States) David Lee (Brazil) Lucas Saatkamp
Preceded by (United States) Russell Holmes	Best Blocker of FIVB Club World Championship; 2012 2013 ex aequo (Italy) Matteo Burgsthaler	Succeeded by (Cuba) Robertlandy Simón (Brazil) José Santos Júnior
Preceded by -	Best Middle Blocker of FIVB World Grand Champions Cup; 2013 ex aequo (United States) Maxwell Holt	Succeeded by (Italy) Matteo Piano (Brazil) Lucas Saatkamp
Preceded by -	Best Middle Blocker of Olympic Games; 2016 ex aequo (Russia) Artem Volvich	Succeeded by (Russia) Ivan Iakovlev (France) Barthélémy Chinenyeze
