= Trentino (disambiguation) =

Trentino is an Italian province.

Trentino may also refer to:

- Trentino-Alto Adige/Südtirol, an Italian region
- Trentino Volley, a volleyball team from Trentino
