= Angelo Lorenzetti =

Italian volleyball coach (born 1964)

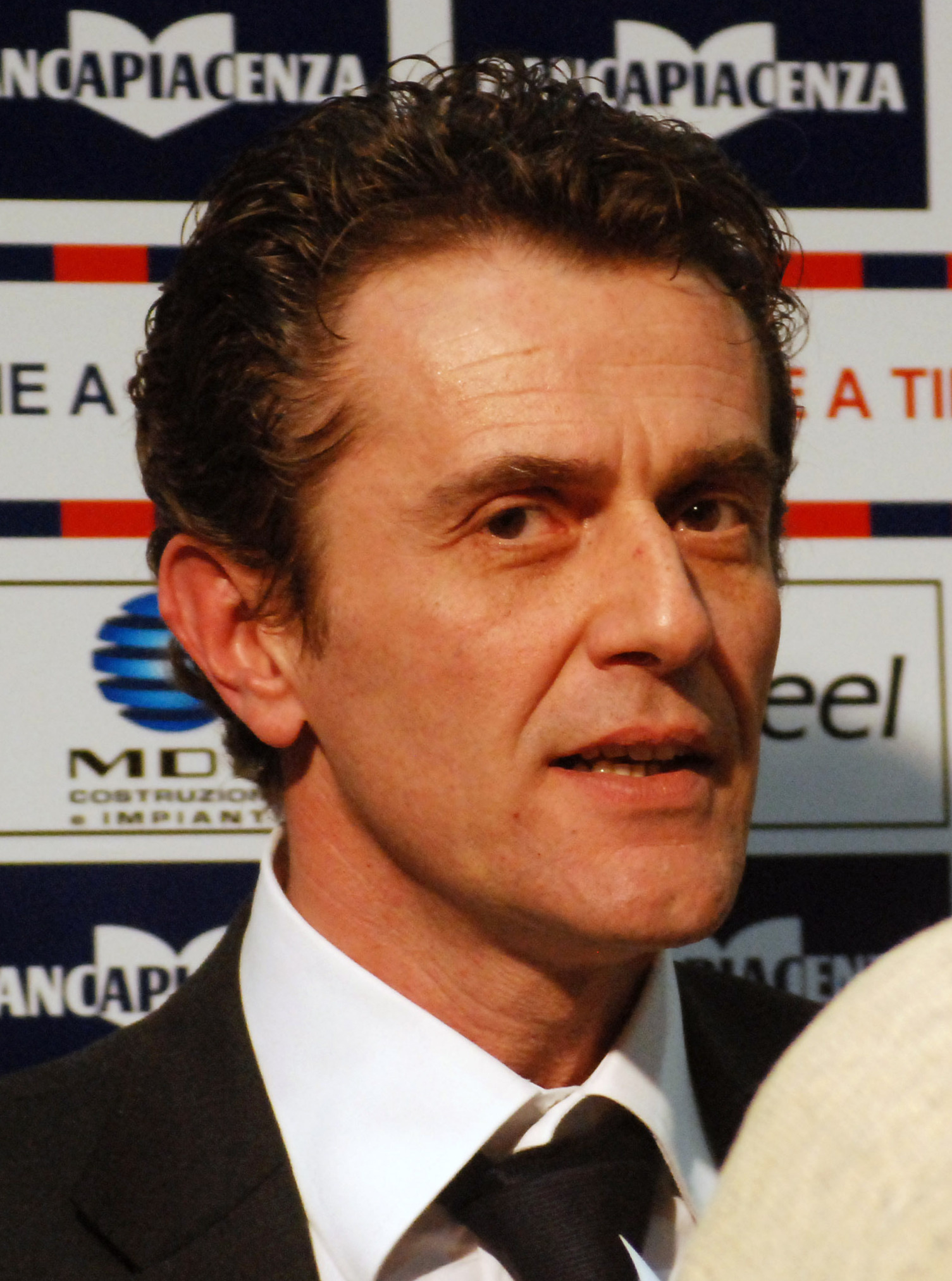
- Lorenzetti in 2009

Personal information
- Nationality: Italy
- Born: 11 May 1964 (age 62); Fano
- Hometown: Trento

Angelo Lorenzetti (born 11 May 1964 in Fano) is an Italian volleyball coach. He is the coach Italian Club Sir Safety Susa Perugia.

Lorenzetti former coach Italy u21 team, Padova, Verona, Piacenza and Modena. He firstly in Fano, before moving on to lead various junior and youth National Teams of Italy. He took charge of Trentino in the summer of 2016 , replacing Radostin Stoychev, leading the side to the silver medal in the 2017 European CEV Cup. Under his guidance, Trentino were also runners-up in last year's Italian League and Italian Cup.

After his successful coaching career in Trentino, he was introduced as new head coach of top volleyball club team Sir Safety Susa Perugia starting from 2023.
