= Marcelo Mendes =

Marcelo Mendes may refer to:

- Marcelo Mendes (beach soccer) (born 1970), Brazilian beach soccer manager
- Marcelo Mendes (footballer) (born 1979), Brazilian football manager and former player

== See also ==
- Marcelo Méndez (disambiguation)
