= Osmany Juantorena =

Cuban-Italian volleyball player

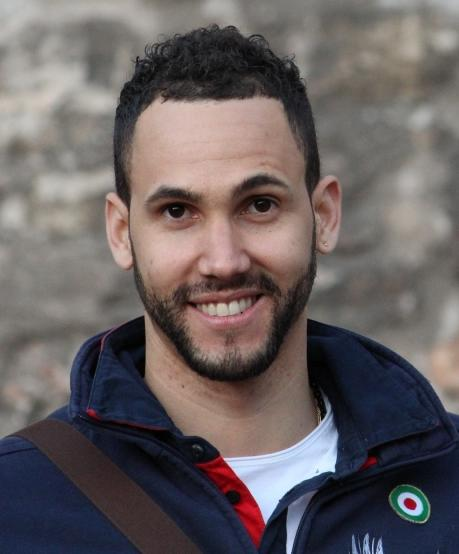

Personal information
- Full name: Osmany Juantorena Portuondo
- Nationality: Cuban; Italian
- Born: 12 August 1985 (age 41); Santiago de Cuba, Cuba
- Height: 2.00 m (6 ft 7 in)
- Weight: 85 kg (187 lb)
- Spike: 370 cm (146 in)
- Block: 340 cm (134 in)

Volleyball information
- Position: Outside hitter
- Current club: Valsa Group Modena
- Number: 5

Career
Years	Teams
1997–2004	Orientales de Santiago
2004–2006	Ural Ufa
2009–2010	Itas Diatec Trentino
2010	→ Al Arabi Ad-Dauha (loan)
2010–2013	Itas Diatec Trentino
2013–2015	Halkbank Ankara
2015–2022	Cucine Lube Civitanova
2022–2023	Shanghai Golden Age
2023	Ziraat Bankasi
2023–2024	Valsa Group Modena
2024–	Vero Volley Monza

National team
2003–2006	Cuba (76)
2015–2021	Italy
Honours
Men's volleyball
Representing Cuba
World League
Bronze medal – third place	2005 Belgrade
Pan American Games
Silver medal – second place	2003 San Domingo	Team
Representing Italy
Olympic Games
Silver medal – second place	2016 Rio de Janeiro	Team
World Cup
Silver medal – second place	2015 Japan
European Championship
Bronze medal – third place	2015 Bulgaria/Italy
- Last updated: 21 October 2022

Osmany Juantorena Portuondo (born 12 August 1985) is a Cuban-born Italian professional volleyball player who plays as an outside hitter for Spanish club CV Guaguas. Juantorena was bronze medalist of the 2005 World League and silver medalist 2016 Summer Olympics. He is a multiple winner of the CEV Champions League and FIVB Club World Championship with the Italian club Trentino Volley. Juantorena is the record owner of the highest number of Most Valuable Player awards at FIVB Club World Championship, with 4 times.

He was a member of the Cuba national volleyball team from 2003 to 2006.

== Personal life ==
Juantorena was born in Santiago de Cuba. He is a nephew of Alberto Juantorena, a Cuban former track runner and politician. Osmany Juantorena and his wife Glenda became first time parents on May 3, 2013 with the arrival of their first baby daughter named Victoria. On September 23, 2018 with arrival second baby daughter named Angelica.

He is fan of Inter and in 2019 he launched a shoe line.

== Career ==
=== Clubs ===
He started his junior career at 12 years old in the Orientales de Santiago. After several years in Cuba, he moved to his first professional club in the Russian league – Ural Ufa – but in November 2006 he received a two-year ban for doping. He agreed to move to Italian club Itas Diatec Trentino when the suspension ended, but the move was obstructed by the Cuban authorities (he was still under their jurisdiction, having moved to Russia with permission rather than defected like some compatriots) and his absence continued across a third year into 2009.

He had immediate success upon resuming his career with Trentino, winning the gold medal at the CEV Champions League twice (2009/10, 2010/11) and the bronze medal in 2012, four gold medals in the FIVB Volleyball Men's Club World Championship (2009, 2010, 2011, 2012), one gold medal (2010/11) and two silver (2009/10, 2011/12) in the Italian Championship, and two Italian Cups (2010, 2012). In May 2010 he had a short loan in Qatar, returning to Trentino in September of that year where he agreed a contract extension and obtained Italian citizenship. In 2012/13 he won another domestic Cup and League Championship.

After moving to Halkbank Ankara in 2013, Juantorena helped the team achieve the Turkish SuperCup and the title of Turkish champion. Another SuperCup followed in 2014. In April 2015, he announced that he would continue his career with Cucine Lube Civitanova.

=== National team ===
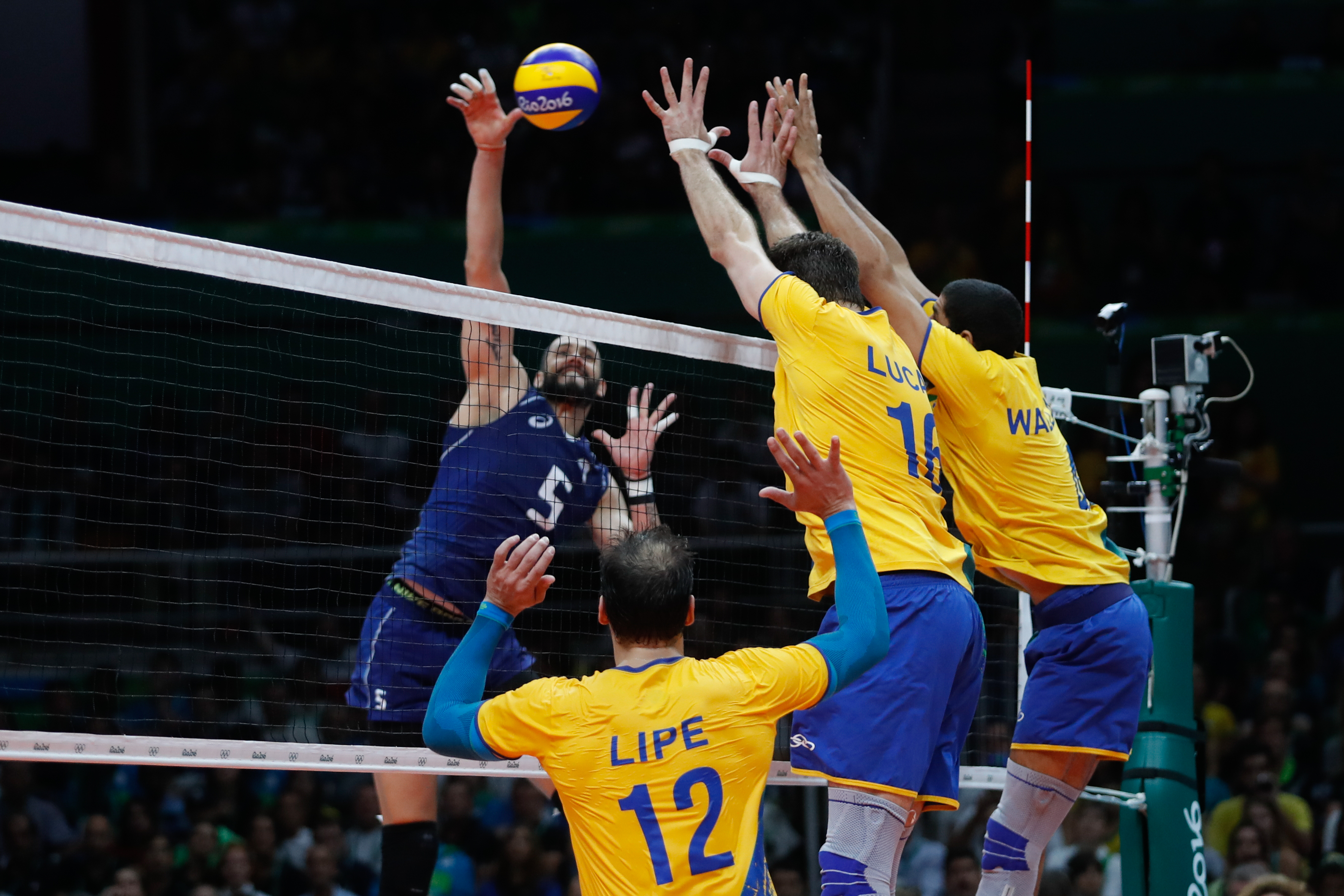
Juantorena (blue #5) at the Rio 2016 Olympic Games final, Italy against Brazil

Juantorena first stormed the international stage from 2003 up to 2006 with Cuba; he won a bronze medal at the 2005 FIVB World League. Juantorena joined the Italy national team in 2015, claiming a European championship bronze and FIVB World Cup silver medal in the same year. He had a hugely positive impact on Italy's attacking prowess going into the 2016 Summer Olympics, his first such tournament, and the team claimed the silver medal.

== Sporting achievements ==
=== Clubs ===
Itas Diatec Trentino

- CEV Champions League:
  - Winner 2009/10, 2010/2011
  - 3rd 2011/12
- FIVB Club World Championship:
  - Winner Qatar 2009, Qatar 2010, Qatar 2011, Qatar 2012
- Italian Championship:
  - Winner 2010/11
  - Runner-up 2009/10, 2011/12, 2012/13
- Italian Cup Serie A:
  - Winner 2009/10, 2011/12, 2012/13

Halkbank Ankara

- CEV Champions League:
  - Finalist 2013/14
- Turkish Championship:
  - Winner 2013/14
  - Runner-up 2014/15
- Turkish Cup:
  - Winner 2014/15
- Turkish SuperCup:
  - Winner 2013, 2014

Cucine Lube Civitanova

- CEV Champions League:
  - Winner 2018/19
  - Finalist 2017/18
  - 3rd 2015/16, 2016/17
- FIVB Club World Championship:
  - Winner Brazil 2019
  - Finalist Poland 2017, Poland 2018, Brazil 2021
- Italian Championship:
  - Winner 2016/17, 2018/19, 2020/21, 2021/22
  - Runner-up 2017/18
- Italian Cup:
  - Winner 2016/17, 2019/20, 2020/21
  - Finalist 2017/18, 2018/19

=== National team ===
Cuba

- Pan American Games:
  - Finalist 2003
- FIVB World League:
  - 3rd 2005

Italy

- Olympic Games:
  - Silver medal 2016
- FIVB Volleyball Men's World Cup:
  - Finalist 2015
- CEV European Championship:
  - 3rd 2015

=== Individual ===
- Russian Volleyball Super League:
  - MVP: 2005
- FIVB World League:
  - Best receiver: 2005
- FIVB Volleyball Men's Club World Championship:
  - MVP: 2010, 2011, 2012, 2017
  - Best server: 2009
  - Best spiker: 2010, 2011
  - Best outside spiker: 2019
- CEV Champions League:
  - MVP: 2010, 2011, 2019
  - Best outside spiker: 2018
- Lega Pallavolo Serie A:
  - Best server: 2011
- Italian Cup:
  - MVP: 2012, 2014, 2020
- Emir of Qatar Cup:
  - MVP: 2012, 2015
- Turkish Men's Volleyball League:
  - MVP: 2014
- FIVB World Cup:
  - Best outside spiker: 2015

Awards
Preceded by (Brazil) Dante Amaral	Best Receiver of FIVB World League; 2005	Succeeded by -
Preceded by -	Best Server of FIVB Club World Championship; 2009	Succeeded by (Argentina) Luciano De Cecco
Preceded by (Bulgaria) Matey Kaziyski	Best Spiker of FIVB Club World Championship; 2010; 2011	Succeeded by (Czech Republic) Jan Štokr
Preceded by (Bulgaria) Matey Kaziyski (Brazil) William Arjona	Most Valuable Player of FIVB Club World Championship; 2010; 2011; 2012; 2017	Succeeded by (Brazil) Wallace de Souza (United States) Aaron Russell
Preceded by (Bulgaria) Matey Kaziyski (Russia) Maxim Mikhaylov	Most Valuable Player of CEV Champions League; 2009/2010; 2010/2011; 2018/2019	Succeeded by (Poland) Mariusz Wlazły
Preceded by (Poland) Wilfredo León (Italy) Ivan Zaytsev	Best Outside Spiker of CEV Champions League; 2017/2018 ex aequo (Poland) Wilfredo León	Succeeded by TBD
Preceded by –	Best Outside Hitter of FIVB World Cup; 2015 ex aequo (Japan) Yūki Ishikawa	Succeeded by (Poland) Wilfredo León (Japan) Yūki Ishikawa
