= Trentino Volley =

Italian volleyball team

Itas Trentino
- Full name: Trentino Volley
- Founded: 2000
- Ground: PalaTrento; Trento, Italy (Capacity: 4,360)
- Chairman: Bruno Da Re
- Manager: Marcelo Méndez
- Captain: Riccardo Sbertoli
- League: Italian Volleyball League
- Website: Club home page

Uniforms
Home	Away

Trentino Volley is a professional Italian volleyball team based in Trento. It has played in the Italian Volleyball League since 2000. They have 5 titles in the FIVB Men's Club World Volleyball Championship, tied with Brazil's Sada Cruzeiro as the most successful men's teams in volleyball history. The team has five wins in the Italian Volleyball League, three in the Italian Cup, three in the Italian Super Cup and three consecutive wins in the CEV Champions League. In the 2010–11 season, the team made history by being the first to win the national, continental and world championship.

Trentino Volley is a Joint stock company, and its president is Diego Mosna. The company has a budget of €4.5 million and about 225 employees. The actions of the company was awarded at continental level with the acknowledgment Testimonial of the Year at the Sport Business Ambitions Awards 2010 and the awarding of the 2010–11 Champions League Final Four, held at PalaOnda, Bolzano.

== Achievements ==
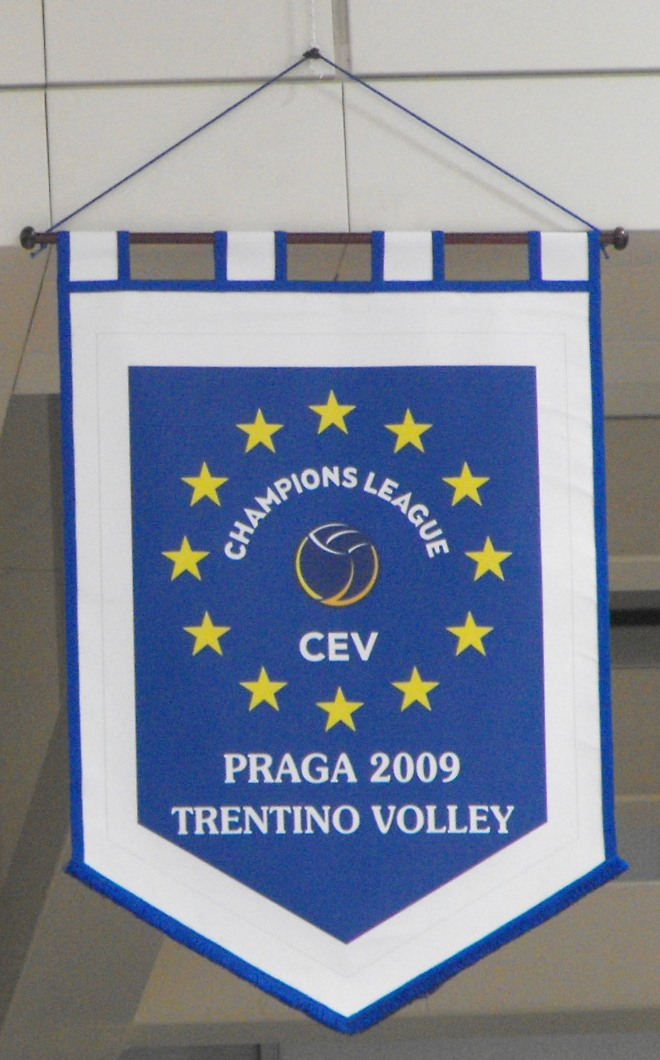
European memorial banner

- CEV Champions League
  (×4) 2009, 2010, 2011, 2024
  (×3) 2016, 2021, 2022
  (×1) 2012
- CEV Cup
  (×1) 2019
  (×2) 2015, 2017
- FIVB Club World Championship
  (×5) 2009, 2010, 2011, 2012, 2018
  (×1) 2022
  (×3) 2013, 2016, 2021
- Italian Championship
  (×6) 2008, 2011, 2013, 2015, 2023, 2025
  (×4) 2009, 2010, 2012, 2017
- Italian Cup
  (×3) 2010, 2012, 2013
  (×6) 2011, 2015, 2016, 2017, 2022, 2023
- Italian SuperCup
  (×3) 2011, 2013, 2021
  (×5) 2008, 2010, 2012, 2015, 2018

== History ==
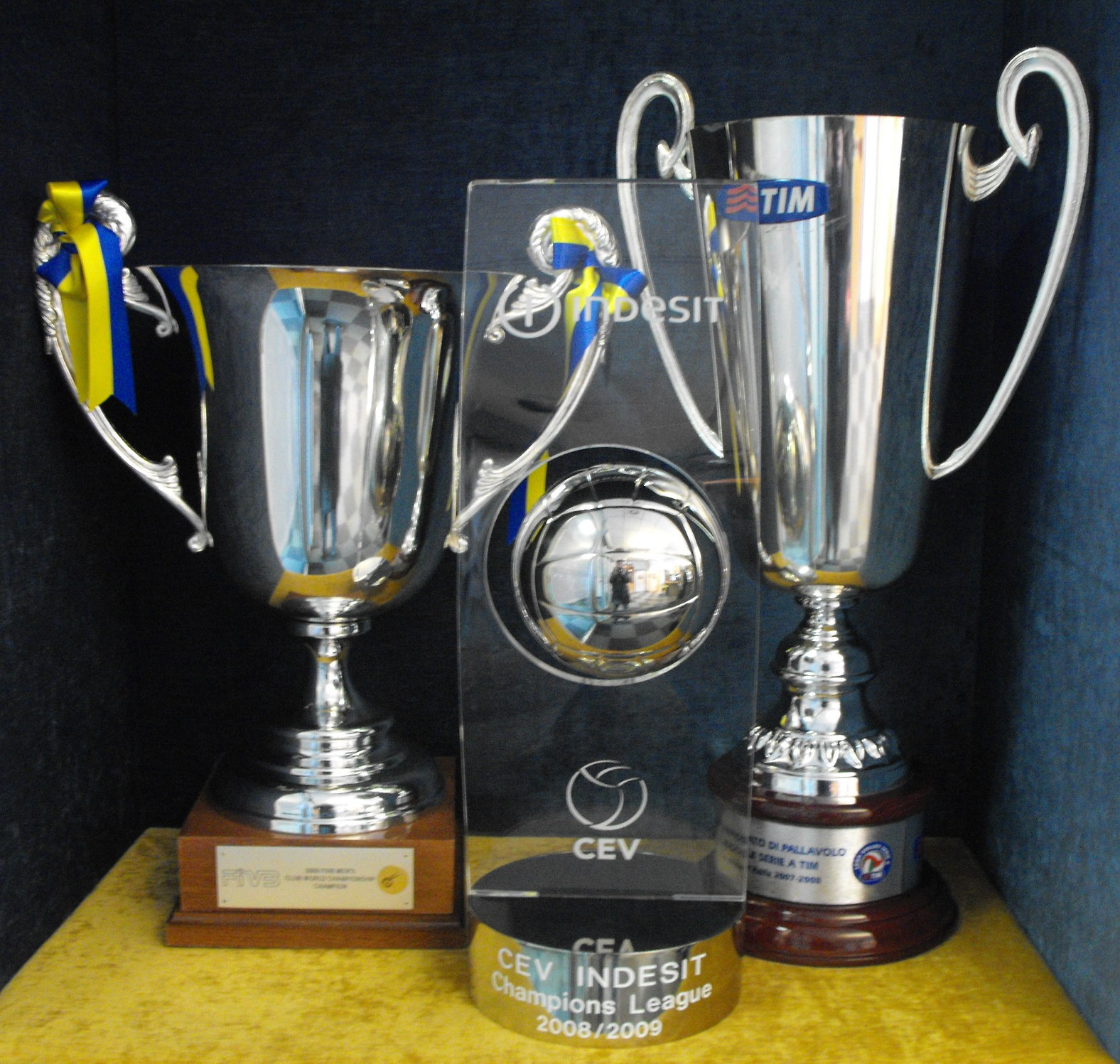
First trophies of Trentino Club

Trentino Volley was founded on 23 May 2000; and two days later, it purchased the rights to play in the Serie A1 (Italy's First Division) from Ravenna, that had retired due to financial problems. The club played its first Serie A1 match in Parma on 15 October 2000 against Maxicono Parma, and was defeated 3–0. The first home match of the Trentino Volley was played on 22 October 2000 against Padova, and the home team came out victorious with a result of 3–2. Trentino Volley are by far the most successful side in the history of the FIVB Volleyball Men’s Club World Championship, having won the title a total of four times. However, the Italian club, founded in 2000 and based in the city of Trento in the northeast of the country, only managed a bronze in 2013, were knocked out during pool play in 2014 (ending up 5th) and missed out on the 2015 edition of the competition. During its first two seasons, the team managed a tenth, and a ninth place finish at the end of the regular season.

Players acquired by the team in his first Italian Serie A years included Lorenzo Bernardi and Andrea Sartoretti. In the summer of 2007 Trentino Volley made substantial purchases, as part of a strategy that would focus on a young team with talented players, such as Serbian Nikola Grbić, Bulgarians Vladimir Nikolov and Matey Kaziyski and Italian Emanuele Birarelli. Itas Trentino Diatec ended the following regular season with a first-place finish, and stepped into the finals. On 7 May 2008 Trentino Volley defeated Piacenza 3–0, to win its first national championship title, and gain access to the CEV Champions League 2008–2009.

Trento run undefeated in the pool stages, with a first-place finish in Group E. On 5 April 2009, at the O2 Arena in Prague, Trento defeated Iraklis Thessaloniki 3–1 in the final. In 2009, the team flew to Doha (Qatar), to compete in the FIVB Men's Club World Volleyball Championship. On Sunday 8 November Trentino Betclic won the final, with a score of 3–0 against the Poles of Skra Bełchatów, and became FIVB Club World Champion. In 2010, it won the Italian Cup and then successfully defended its Champions League title with a 3–0 victory (25–12, 25–20, 25–21) over Dynamo Moscow.

Trentino retired NO.1 jersey for Matey Kaziyski after all the achievements he helped to make for the team. The President of Trentino Volley Bruno Da Re said that "it will no longer be used by any Trentino Volley player", "unless he (Matey Kaziyski) wants to come back to use it again".

== Former names ==
2000–2001	Itas Gruppo Diatec Trentino
2001–2013	Itas Diatec Trentino
2013–2014	Diatec Trentino
2014–2015	Energy T.I. Diatec Trentino
2015–2018	Diatec Trentino
2018–present	Itas Trentino

== Symbols ==
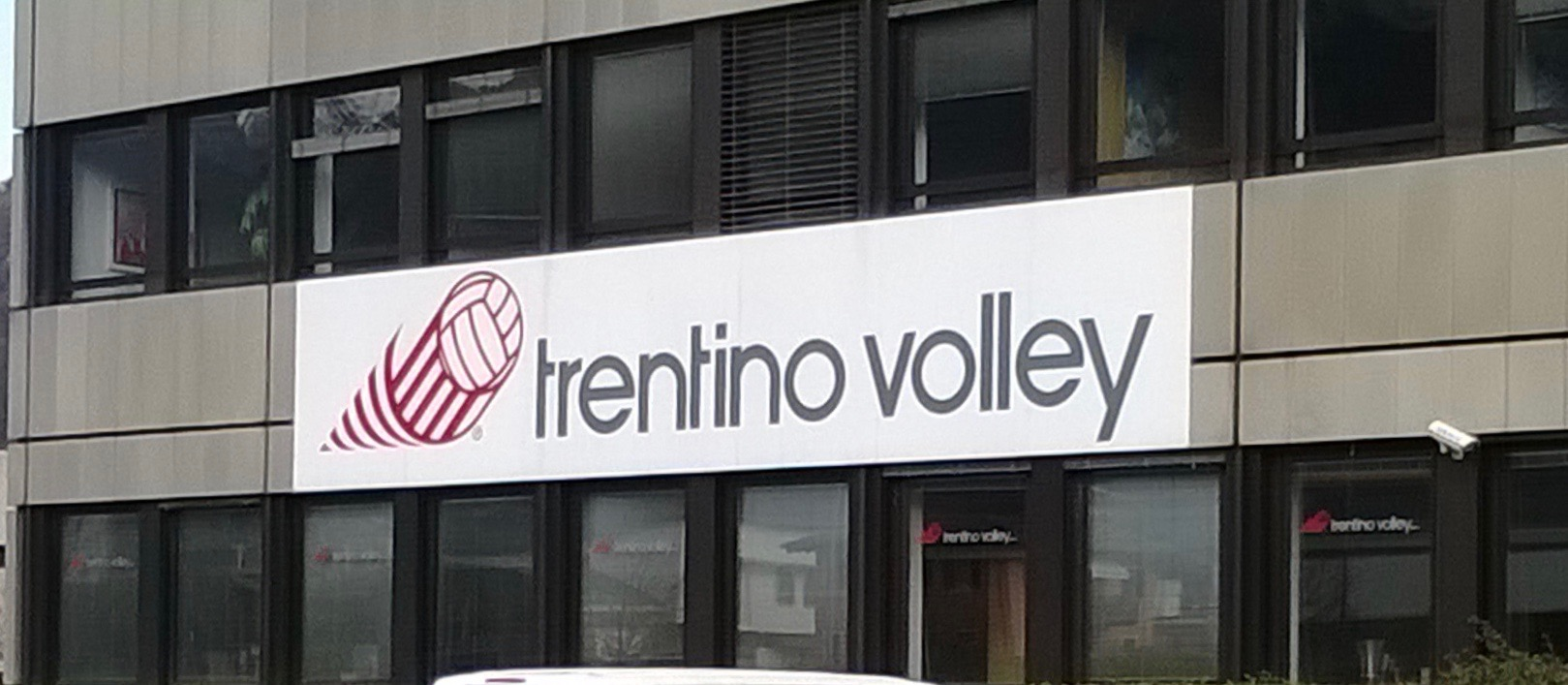
Old logo club in the Building of the Trentino

Club logos and brand names are composed of a red ball. The eagle is the symbol of the club, Autonomous province of Trento is the club's flag.

Trentino Volley unveiled their new logo on 4 July 2022 after sticking with the same for some 22 years. The new logo is to specifically for a digital and young audience. The aim is to make TRENTINO Volley more interesting and captivating, with a focus on the actual name of the club – summarised in the initials “TV”, which stand for TRENTINO Volley.

== Team ==
Team roster – season 2026/2027

No.	Name	Date of birth	Position
2	(Italy) Federico Roberti	19 March 2004 (age 22)	outside hitter
5	(Italy) Alessandro Michieletto	5 December 2001 (age 24)	outside hitter
15	(Italy) Daniele Lavia	4 November 1999 (age 27)	outside hitter
18	(Brazil) Adriano Xavier	6 February 2002 (age 24)	outside hitter
4	(Italy) Nicola Zonta	15 May 2000 (age 26)	setter
6	(Italy) Riccardo Sbertoli (C)	23 May 1998 (age 28)	setter
7	(Italy) Riccardo Gollini	5 July 2000 (age 26)	libero
13	(Italy) Gabriele Laurenzano	12 June 2003 (age 23)	libero
12	(Italy) Elia Bossi	15 August 1994 (age 32)	middle blocker
23	(Brazil) Flávio Gualberto	22 April 1993 (age 33)	middle blocker
29	(Serbia) Aleksandar Nedeljković	27 October 1997 (age 29)	middle blocker
33	(Germany) Simon Torwie	1 November 2001 (age 25)	middle blocker
11	(France) Théo Faure	12 October 1999 (age 27)	opposite
17	(Latvia) Renārs-Pauls Jansons	17 May 2002 (age 24)	opposite
Head coach: (Argentina) Marcelo Méndez

Team roster – season 2022/2023

No.	Name	Date of birth	Position
1	(Bulgaria) Matey Kaziyski (C)	23 September 1984 (age 42)	outside hitter
2	(Italy) Gabriele Nelli	4 December 1993 (age 32)	opposite
3	(Belgium) Wout D'Heer	26 April 2001 (age 25)	middle blocker
4	(Czech Republic) Donovan Džavoronok	23 July 1997 (age 29)	outside hitter
5	(Italy) Alessandro Michieletto	5 December 2001 (age 24)	outside hitter
6	(Italy) Riccardo Sbertoli	23 May 1998 (age 28)	setter
7	(Italy) Oreste Cavuto	5 December 1996 (age 29)	outside hitter
8	(Italy) Domenico Pace	2 October 2000 (age 26)	libero
10	(Italy) Martin Berger	3 April 2003 (age 23)	middle blocker
11	(Italy) Niccolò Depalma	9 November 2002 (age 23)	setter
13	(Italy) Gabriele Laurenzano	12 June 2003 (age 23)	libero
15	(Italy) Daniele Lavia	4 November 1999 (age 27)	outside hitter
18	(Serbia) Marko Podraščanin	29 August 1987 (age 39)	middle blocker
20	(Serbia) Srećko Lisinac	17 May 1992 (age 34)	middle blocker
Head coach: (Italy) Angelo Lorenzetti; Assistant: (Italy) Francesco Petrella

Team roster – season 2021/2022
No.	Name	Date of birth	Position
1	(Bulgaria) Matey Kaziyski (C)	September 23, 1984 (age 42)	outside hitter
3	(Belgium) Wout D'Heer	April 26, 2001 (age 25)	middle blocker
5	(Italy) Alessandro Michieletto	December 5, 2001 (age 24)	outside hitter
6	(Italy) Riccardo Sbertoli	May 23, 1998 (age 28)	setter
7	(Italy) Oreste Cavuto	December 5, 1996 (age 29)	outside hitter
10	(Italy) Giulio Pinali	April 2, 1997 (age 29)	opposite
12	(Italy) Daniele Albergati	June 21, 1993 (age 33)	opposite
15	(Italy) Daniele Lavia	November 4, 1999 (age 27)	outside hitter
16	(Germany) Julian Zenger	August 26, 1997 (age 29)	libero
18	(Serbia) Marko Podraščanin	August 29, 1987 (age 39)	middle blocker
20	(Serbia) Srećko Lisinac	May 17, 1992 (age 34)	middle blocker
22	(Italy) Lorenzo Sperotto	April 28, 1999 (age 27)	setter
24	(Italy) Carlo De Angelis	January 10, 1996 (age 30)	libero
Head coach: Angelo Lorenzetti

Team roster – season 2020/2021
Diatec Trentino
No.	Name	Date of birth	Position
2	(Italy) Lorenzo Cortesia	September 26, 1999	middle blocker
3	(Italy) Andrea Argenta	June 1, 1996	opposite
5	(Italy) Alessandro Michieletto	December 5, 2001	outside hitter
6	(Italy) Lorenzo Sperotto	April 28, 1999	setter
7	(Italy) Salvatore Rossini	July 13, 1986	libero
8	(Brazil) Ricardo Lucarelli	February 14, 1992	outside hitter
9	(Italy) Simone Giannelli (C)	August 9, 1996	setter
11	(Netherlands) Dick Kooy	December 3, 1987	outside hitter
14	(Netherlands) Nimir Abdel-Aziz	February 5, 1992	opposite
16	(Cuba) Luis Tomas Sosa	May 18, 1995	outside hitter
18	(Serbia) Marko Podraščanin	August 29, 1987	middle blocker
20	(Serbia) Srećko Lisinac	May 17, 1992	middle blocker
24	(Italy) Carlo De Angelis	January 10, 1996	libero
Head coach: Angelo Lorenzetti

Team roster – season 2019/2020
Diatec Trentino
No.	Name	Date of birth	Position
2	(United States) Aaron Russell	June 4, 1993	outside hitter
6	(Italy) Nicola Daldello	May 6, 1983	setter
7	(Italy) Luca Vettori	April 26, 1991	opposite
8	(Italy) Carlo De Angelis	January 10, 1996	libero
9	(Italy) Simone Giannelli (C)	August 9, 1996	setter
10	(France) Jenia Grebennikov	August 13, 1990	libero
11	(Italy) Davide Candellaro	June 7, 1989	middle blocker
12	(Greece) Mitar Tzourits	April 25, 1989	opposite
15	(Italy) Lorenzo Codarin	September 13, 1996	middle blocker
16	(Cuba) Luis Tomas Sosa	May 18, 1995	outside hitter
18	(Slovenia) Klemen Čebulj	February 21, 1992	outside hitter
20	(Serbia) Srećko Lisinac	May 17, 1992	middle blocker
93	(Serbia) Uroš Kovačević	May 6, 1993	outside hitter
Head coach: Angelo Lorenzetti

Team roster – season 2018/2019
Diatec Trentino
No.	Name	Date of birth	Position
2	(United States) Aaron Russell	June 4, 1993	outside hitter
3	(Netherlands) Maarten van Garderen	January 24, 1990	outside hitter
4	(Italy) Gabriele Nelli	December 4, 1993	opposite
5	(Italy) Oreste Cavuto	December 5, 1996	outside hitter
6	(Italy) Nicola Daldello	May 6, 1983	setter
7	(Italy) Luca Vettori	April 26, 1991	opposite
8	(Italy) Carlo De Angelis	January 10, 1996	libero
9	(Italy) Simone Giannelli (C)	August 9, 1996	setter
10	(France) Jenia Grebennikov	August 13, 1990	libero
11	(Italy) Davide Candellaro	June 7, 1989	middle blocker
15	(Italy) Lorenzo Codarin	September 13, 1996	middle blocker
20	(Serbia) Srećko Lisinac	May 17, 1992	middle blocker
93	(Serbia) Uroš Kovačević	May 6, 1993	outside hitter
Head coach: Angelo Lorenzetti

Team roster – season 2017/2018
Diatec Trentino
No.	Name	Date of birth	Position
2	(Serbia) Uroš Kovačević	May 6, 1993	outside hitter
3	(Canada) Nicholas Hoag	May 19, 1992	outside hitter
4	(Slovenia) Jan Kozamernik	December 24, 1995	middle blocker
5	(Italy) Oreste Cavuto	December 5, 1996	outside hitter
7	(Italy) Luca Vettori	April 26, 1991	opposite
8	(Italy) Matteo Chiappa	July 6, 1993	libero
9	(Italy) Simone Giannelli	August 9, 1996	setter
10	(Italy) Filippo Lanza (C)	March 3, 1991	outside hitter
11	(Australia) Aidan Zingel	November 19, 1990	middle blocker
12	(Estonia) Renee Teppan	September 26, 1993	opposite
15	(Italy) Pier Paolo Partenio	February 6, 1993	setter
16	(Brazil) Eder Carbonera	October 19, 1983	middle blocker
17	(Italy) Daniele De Pandis	June 30, 1984	libero
Head coach: Angelo Lorenzetti; Assistant: Francesco Petrella

Team roster – season 2016/2017
Diatec Trentino
No.	Name	Date of birth	Position
2	(Italy) Gabriele Nelli	December 4, 1993	opposite
3	(Italy) Matteo Burgsthaler	February 18, 1981	middle blocker
4	(Italy) Oleg Antonov	July 28, 1988	outside hitter
5	(Italy) Tiziano Mazzone	July 22, 1995	outside hitter
6	(Italy) Alessandro Blasi	March 22, 1992	setter
8	(Italy) Matteo Chiappa	July 6, 1993	libero
9	(Italy) Simone Giannelli	August 9, 1996	setter
10	(Italy) Filippo Lanza (C)	March 3, 1991	outside hitter
11	(Argentina) Sebastián Solé	June 12, 1991	middle blocker
12	(Belgium) Simon Van De Voorde	December 19, 1989	middle blocker
13	(Italy) Massimo Colaci	February 21, 1985	libero
14	(Czech Republic) Jan Štokr	January 16, 1983	outside hitter
17	(Slovenia) Tine Urnaut	September 3, 1988	outside hitter
18	(Italy) Daniele Mazzone	June 4, 1992	middle blocker
Head coach: Angelo Lorenzetti; Assistant: Dario Simoni

Team roster – season 2015/2016
Diatec Trentino
No.	Name	Date of birth	Position
1	(Bulgaria) Matey Kaziyski	September 23, 1984	outside hitter
2	(Italy) Gabriele Nelli	December 4, 1993	opposite
4	(Italy) Oleg Antonov	July 28, 1988	outside hitter
6	(Bulgaria) Georgi Bratoev	October 21, 1987	setter
8	(Italy) Carlo De Angelis	January 10, 1996	libero
9	(Italy) Simone Giannelli	August 9, 1996	setter
10	(Italy) Filippo Lanza (C)	March 3, 1991	outside hitter
11	(Argentina) Sebastian Solé	June 12, 1991	middle blocker
12	(Greece) Mitar Tzourits	April 25, 1989	opposite
13	(Italy) Massimo Colaci	February 21, 1985	libero
14	(Belgium) Simon Van De Voorde	December 19, 1989	middle blocker
16	(Italy) Tiziano Mazzone	July 22, 1995	outside hitter
17	(Slovenia) Tine Urnaut	September 3, 1988	outside hitter
18	(Italy) Daniele Mazzone	June 4, 1992	middle blocker
Head coach: Radostin Stoychev; Assistant: Dario Simoni

=== Coach history ===
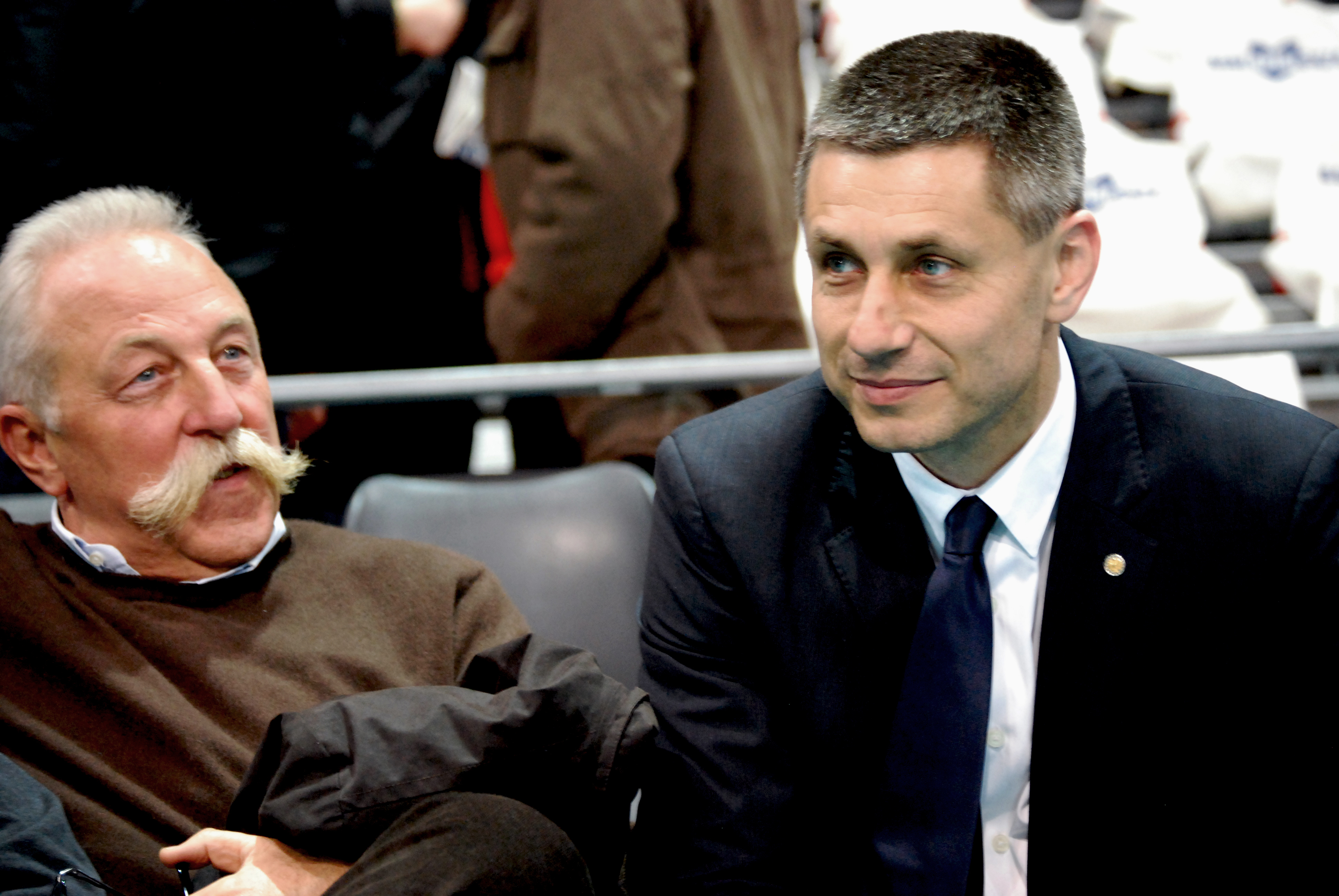
Stoytchev with Mosna

Years (seasons)	Coach	Matches	Win	Lost	Titles won
2000 – 2003 (3)	(Italy) Bruno Bagnoli	88	40	48	
2003 – 2005 (2)	(Italy) Silvano Prandi	61	38	23	
2005 (1)	(Italy) Andrea Burattini	10	3	7	
2005 – 2007 (2)	(Brazil) Radames Lattari	64	31	33	
2007 – 2013 (6)	(Bulgaria) Radostin Stoychev	293	244	49	14 (3x 3x 1x 3x 4x)
2013 – 2014 (1)	(Italy) Roberto Serniotti	47	29	18	1x
2014 – 2016 (2) (Note: Total de Stoytchev: 8 temporadas, 389 partidos, 319 ganados, 70 perdidos y 15 títulos ganados.)	(Bulgaria) Radostin Stoychev	96	75	21	1x
2016 – present	(Italy) Angelo Lorenzetti	156	110	46	1x 1x 1x

== Notable players ==
- 1999–2001 Enrique de la Fuente
- 2000–2001 Igor Shulepov
- 2000–2002 Konstantin Ushakov
- 2000–2002 Slobodan Boškan
- 2000–2002 Đula Mešter
- 2001–2005 Paolo Tofoli
- 2002–2003 Igor Vušurović
- 2002–2004 Lorenzo Bernardi
- 2002–2004 Aleksey Kazakov
- 2002–2005 Andrea Sartoretti
- 2004–2005 Goran Vujević
- 2004–2007 André Heller
- 2005–2006 Ryan Millar
- 2005–2007 André Nascimento
- 2005–2007 Marco Meoni
- 2006–2009 Michał Winiarski
- 2007–2008 Vladimir Nikolov
- 2007–2009 Nikola Grbić
- 2007–2013, 2014–2015 Matey Kaziyski
- 2007–2015 Emanuele Birarelli
- 2008–2010 Leandro Vissotto
- 2008–2012, 2014–2015 Łukasz Żygadło
- 2009–2010, 2010–2013 Osmany Juantorena
- 2009–2012, 2013–2014 Tsvetan Sokolov
- 2009–2013 Raphael Vieira de Oliveira
- 2010–2011 Valentin Bratoev
- 2010–2017 Massimo Colaci
- 2011–2016 Filippo Lanza
- 2012–2021 Simone Giannelli
- 2016–2018 Jenia Grebennikov

=== Individual records ===
- Number of matches

Matches	Player	Position	Seasons
345	(Italy) Emanuele Birarelli	C	2007–2015 (8)
345	(Italy) Massimo Colaci	L	2010–present (7)
339	(Italy) Andrea Bari	L	2005–2013 (8)
334	(Bulgaria) Matey Kaziyski	R/A	2007–2013 & 2014–16 (8)
252	(Italy) Filippo Lanza	R/A	2011–present (6)
215	(Italy) Dore Della Lunga	R/A	2005–2009 & 2010–2012 (6)
193	(Cuba) (Italy) Osmany Juantorena	R/A	2009–2013 (4)
191	(Poland) Łukasz Żygadło	A	2008–2012 & 2014–2015 (5)
191	(Brazil) Raphael	A	2009–2013 (4)
191	(Czech Republic) Jan Štokr	O	2010–2013 & 2016–2017 (4)

- Points Record

Points	Player	Position	Seasons
4945	(Bulgaria) Matey Kaziyski	R/A	2007–2013 & 2014–16 (8)
2622	(Cuba) (Italy) Osmany Juantorena	R/A	2009–2013 (4)
2539	(Italy) Emanuele Birarelli	C	2007–2015 (8)
2535	(Czech Republic) Jan Štokr	O	2010–2013 y 2016–2017 (4)
2301	(Italy) Filippo Lanza	R/A	2011–present (6)
1425	(Bulgaria) Tsvetan Sokolov	O	2009–2012 & 2013–14 (4)
1401	(Greece) Mitar Djuric (Note: En la temporada 2014–15 Djuric disputó solamente los playoff sumando 9 partidos y 119 puntos.)	C/O	2011–2013 & 2014–16 (4)
1362	(Brazil) Leandro Vissotto	O	2008–2010 (2)
1209	(Italy) Andrea Sartoretti	O	2003–2005 (3)
1191	(Poland) Michał Winiarski	R/A	2006–2009 (3

== Stadium ==
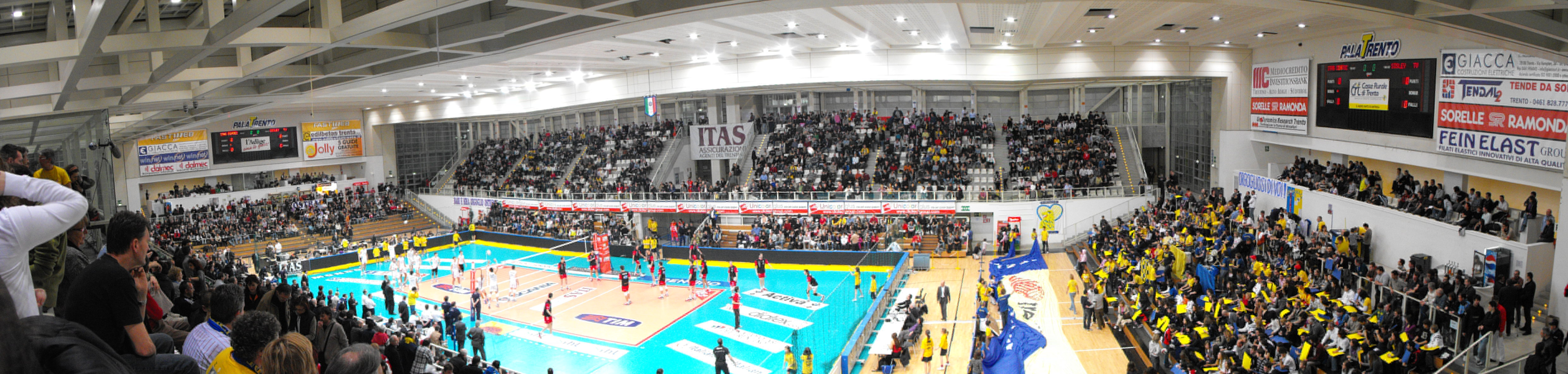
One match in PalaTrento

The PalaTrento arena has always been the place where the club's at home games have been disputed, ever since its opening in 2000 during the first at home game in the history of Trentino Volley (Itas Diatec Trentino-European Padua 3–2 on 22 October 2000), The arena is in the south of the city of Trento on the Ghiaie sport groundsthat also includes the PalaGhiaccio, a football field, and a ballpark.

== Kit providers ==
The table below shows the history of kit providers for the Trentino team.

Period	Kit provider
2000–	Mikasa; Kappa; Erreà

=== Sponsorship ===
Primary sponsors include: main sponsors like Diatec Group other sponsors: Volkswagen, Consorzio Melinda, Dorigoni Trento, Scania, Mediocredito Italiano, McDonald's, Intesa Sanpaolo, Marzadro Distillery, Südtiroler Volksbank, Grand Hotel Trento, Sparco, Forst, Superpoli, Menz & Gasser and Policura.
