= 2008–09 CEV Champions League =

- League: CEV Champions League
- Sport: Volleyball
- Duration: 4 November 2008 – 5 April 2009
- Number of teams: 24

Finals
- Venue: (Czech Republic) Prague
- Champions: (Italy) Trentino Volley
- Finals MVP: (Bulgaria) Matey Kaziyski

CEV Champions League seasons
- ← 2007–08 2009–10 →

The 2008–09 CEV Champions League was the 50th edition of the highest level European volleyball club competition organised by the European Volleyball Confederation.

== Participating teams ==
Rank	Country	Number of teams	Teams
1	Italy	3	Trentino Volley; Lube Banca Marche Macerata; Copra Nord Meccanica Piacenza
2	Russia	3	Dynamo Moscow; Zenit Kazan; Iskra Odintsovo
3	Greece	2	Iraklis Thessaloniki; Panathinaikos Athens
4	Poland	2	PGE Skra Bełchatów; Domex Tytan AZS Częstochowa
5	Spain	1	Pòrtol Palma Mallorca
6	France	2	Paris Volley; Beauvais Oise
7	Belgium	2	Knack Randstad Roeselare; Noliko Maaseik
8	Germany	1	VfB Friedrichshafen
9	Austria	1	Hotvolleys Vienna
10	Czech Republic	1	Jihostroj České Budějovice
11	Netherlands	1	Piet Zoomers/D Apeldoorn
12	Turkey	1	Fenerbahçe İstanbul
13	Slovenia	1	ACH Volley Bled
14	Serbia	1	Crvena Zvezda Beograd
21	Bulgaria	1	CSKA Sofia
25	Portugal	1	Vitória SC

== League round ==
24 teams will be drawn to 6 pools of 4 teams each. The 1st – 2nd ranked and four with best score 3rd teams ranked will qualify for the Play-off 1/8 finals. The 2 remaining 3rd ranked teams and the two 4th ranked teams with the best score move to CEV Cup. The remaining 4th ranked teams are eliminated.

=== Pool A ===
Pos	Team	Pld	W	L	Pts	SW	SL	SR	SPW	SPL	SPR	Qualification
1	(Greece) Iraklis Thessaloniki	6	6	0	12	18	4	4.500	544	461	1.180	8th Finals
2	(Poland) Domex Tytan AZS Częstochowa	6	3	3	9	12	10	1.200	496	475	1.044	8th Finals
3	(Turkey) Fenerbahçe İstanbul	6	3	3	9	10	12	0.833	476	513	0.928	8th Finals
4	(Bulgaria) CSKA Sofia	6	0	6	6	4	18	0.222	476	543	0.877	

=== Pool B ===
Pos	Team	Pld	W	L	Pts	SW	SL	SR	SPW	SPL	SPR	Qualification
1	(Russia) Dynamo Moscow	6	6	0	12	18	5	3.600	550	470	1.170	8th Finals
2	(Belgium) Noliko Maaseik	6	3	3	9	11	10	1.100	478	450	1.062	8th Finals
3	(Portugal) Vitória SC	6	3	3	9	11	11	1.000	492	506	0.972	8th Finals
4	(Czech Republic) Jihostroj České Budějovice	6	0	6	6	4	18	0.222	441	535	0.824	

=== Pool C ===
Pos	Team	Pld	W	L	Pts	SW	SL	SR	SPW	SPL	SPR	Qualification
1	(Italy) Lube Banca Marche Macerata	6	5	1	11	16	6	2.667	535	458	1.168	8th Finals
2	(Belgium) Knack Randstad Roeselare	6	4	2	10	13	7	1.857	467	453	1.031	8th Finals
3	(Spain) Pòrtol Palma Mallorca	6	3	3	9	9	10	0.900	427	437	0.977	8th Finals
4	(Serbia) Crvena Zvezda Beograd	6	0	6	6	3	18	0.167	429	510	0.841	

=== Pool D ===
Pos	Team	Pld	W	L	Pts	SW	SL	SR	SPW	SPL	SPR	Qualification
1	(Italy) Copra Nord Meccanica Piacenza	6	5	1	11	17	9	1.889	619	548	1.130	8th Finals
2	(Russia) Zenit Kazan	6	4	2	10	14	9	1.556	529	503	1.052	8th Finals
3	(France) Paris Volley	6	2	4	8	10	13	0.769	523	545	0.960	2008–09 CEV Cup
4	(Netherlands) Piet Zoomers/D Apeldoorn	6	1	5	7	7	17	0.412	484	559	0.866	

=== Pool E ===
Pos	Team	Pld	W	L	Pts	SW	SL	SR	SPW	SPL	SPR	Qualification
1	(Italy) Trentino Volley	6	6	0	12	18	3	6.000	510	411	1.241	8th Finals
2	(Slovenia) ACH Volley Bled	6	3	3	9	10	12	0.833	489	497	0.984	8th Finals
3	(France) Beauvais Oise	6	2	4	8	8	15	0.533	495	553	0.895	2008–09 CEV Cup
4	(Austria) Hotvolleys Vienna	6	1	5	7	9	15	0.600	523	556	0.941	2008–09 CEV Cup

=== Pool F ===
Pos	Team	Pld	W	L	Pts	SW	SL	SR	SPW	SPL	SPR	Qualification
1	(Russia) Iskra Odintsovo	6	4	2	10	13	9	1.444	493	494	0.998	8th Finals
2	(Germany) VfB Friedrichshafen	6	3	3	9	13	10	1.300	533	503	1.060	8th Finals
3	(Poland) PGE Skra Bełchatów	6	3	3	9	9	10	0.900	424	436	0.972	8th Finals
4	(Greece) Panathinaikos Athens	6	2	4	8	9	15	0.600	536	553	0.969	2008–09 CEV Cup

== 8th Finals ==
Team 1	Agg.	Team 2	1st leg	2nd leg
Lube Banca Marche Macerata (Italy)	5–3	(Turkey) Fenerbahçe İstanbul	3–0	2–3
ACH Volley Bled (Slovenia)	2–6	(Russia) Zenit Kazan	2–3	0–3
Copra Nord Meccanica Piacenza (Italy)	2–6	(Poland) Domex Tytan AZS Częstochowa	2–3	0–3
Pòrtol Palma Mallorca (Spain)	0–6	(Italy) Trentino Volley	0–3	0–3
Dynamo Moscow (Russia)	4–5	(Poland) PGE Skra Bełchatów	3–2	1–3
Noliko Maaseik (Belgium)	1–6	(Russia) Iskra Odintsovo	1–3	0–3
Knack Randstad Roeselare (Russia)	4–5	(Germany) VfB Friedrichshafen	1–3	3–2
Vitória SC (Portugal)	2–6	(Greece) Iraklis Thessaloniki	0–3	2–3

=== First leg ===
Date	Time		Score		Set 1	Set 2	Set 3	Set 4	Set 5	Total
11 Feb	20:30	Lube Banca Marche Macerata (Italy)	3–0	(Turkey) Fenerbahçe İstanbul	25–22	25–23	25–21			75–66
12 Feb	20:15	ACH Volley Bled (Slovenia)	2–3	(Russia) Zenit Kazan	28–30	33–31	25–19	13–25	10–15	109–120
12 Feb	20:30	Copra Nord Meccanica Piacenza (Italy)	2–3	(Poland) Domex Tytan AZS Częstochowa	23–25	23–25	25–23	25–17	14–16	110–106
10 Feb	20:30	Pòrtol Palma Mallorca (Spain)	0–3	(Italy) Trentino Volley	17–25	20–25	18–25			75–63
11 Feb	19:00	Dynamo Moscow (Russia)	3–2	(Poland) PGE Skra Bełchatów	25–21	22–25	25–23	28–30	15–13	115–112
10 Feb	20:30	Noliko Maaseik (Belgium)	1–3	(Russia) Iskra Odintsovo	21–25	25–20	16–25	23–25		85–95
11 Feb	20:30	Knack Randstad Roeselare (Belgium)	1–3	(Germany) VfB Friedrichshafen	27–25	20–25	15–25	21–25		83–100
12 Feb	20:30	Vitória SC (Portugal)	0–3	(Greece) Iraklis Thessaloniki	23–25	23–25	19–25			65–75

=== Second leg ===
Date	Time		Score		Set 1	Set 2	Set 3	Set 4	Set 5	Total
18 Feb	19:00	Fenerbahçe İstanbul (Turkey)	3–2	(Italy) Lube Banca Marche Macerata	19–25	27–29	25–16	25–23	15–13	111–106
18 Feb	20:00	Zenit Kazan (Russia)	3–0	(Slovenia) ACH Volley Bled	25–18	25–20	25–19			75–57
18 Feb	20:30	Domex Tytan AZS Częstochowa (Poland)	3–0	(Italy) Copra Nord Meccanica Piacenza	25–22	25–20	25–23			75–65
18 Feb	20:30	Trentino Volley (Italy)	3–0	(Spain) Pòrtol Palma Mallorca	25–13	25–14	25–19			75–46
18 Feb	18:00	PGE Skra Bełchatów (Poland)	3–1	(Russia) Dynamo Moscow	18–25	25–21	25–21	25–19		93–86
18 Feb	18:00	Iskra Odintsovo (Russia)	3–0	(Belgium) Noliko Maaseik	25–16	25–21	25–21			75–58
18 Feb	20:00	VfB Friedrichshafen (Germany)	2–3	(Belgium) Knack Randstad Roeselare	25–16	22–25	25–22	22–25	11–15	105–103
19 Feb	18:05	Iraklis Thessaloniki (Greece)	3–2	(Portugal) Vitória SC	25–13	21–25	23–25	25–19	15–9	109–91

== 4th Finals ==
Team 1	Agg.	Team 2	1st leg	2nd leg
Lube Banca Marche Macerata (Italy)	5–3	(Russia) Zenit Kazan	3–0	2–3
Domex Tytan AZS Częstochowa (Poland)	1–6	(Italy) Trentino Volley	1–3	0–3
PGE Skra Bełchatów (Poland)	3–5	(Russia) Iskra Odintsovo	3–2	0–3
VfB Friedrichshafen (Germany)	0–6	(Greece) Iraklis Thessaloniki	0–3	0–3

=== First leg ===
Date	Time		Score		Set 1	Set 2	Set 3	Set 4	Set 5	Total
4 Mar	20:30	Lube Banca Marche Macerata (Italy)	3–0	(Russia) Zenit Kazan	26–24	25–18	25–20			76–62
4 Mar	18:30	Domex Tytan AZS Częstochowa (Poland)	1–3	(Italy) Trentino Volley	25–22	21–25	17–25	18–25		81–97
3 Mar	18:00	PGE Skra Bełchatów (Poland)	3–2	(Russia) Iskra Odintsovo	25–27	25–15	25–23	23–25	17–15	115–105
4 Mar	20:00	VfB Friedrichshafen (Germany)	0–3	(Greece) Iraklis Thessaloniki	21–25	25–27	18–25			64–77

=== Second leg ===
Date	Time		Score		Set 1	Set 2	Set 3	Set 4	Set 5	Total
11 Mar	19:00	Zenit Kazan (Russia)	3–2	(Italy) Lube Banca Marche Macerata	20–25	25–23	23–25	25–20	15–11	108–104
11 Mar	20:30	Trentino Volley (Italy)	3–0	(Poland) Domex Tytan AZS Częstochowa	25–19	25–14	25–12			75–45
12 Mar	19:00	Iskra Odintsovo (Russia)	3–0	(Poland) PGE Skra Bełchatów	25–20	25–18	25–16			75–54
11 Mar	19:15	Iraklis Thessaloniki (Greece)	3–0	(Germany) VfB Friedrichshafen	25–18	25–20	28–26			78–64

== Final Four ==
- Place: (Czech Republic) Prague
- All times are Central European Summer Time (UTC+02:00).

Semifinals
4 April
(Russia) Iskra Odintsovo	1
(Greece) Iraklis Thessaloniki	3
4 April
(Italy) Trentino Volley	3
(Italy) Lube Banca Marche Macerata	0

Final
5 April
(Greece) Iraklis Thessaloniki	1
(Italy) Trentino Volley	3
3rd place match
5 April
(Russia) Iskra Odintsovo	3
(Italy) Lube Banca Marche Macerata	2

=== Semifinals ===
Date	Time		Score		Set 1	Set 2	Set 3	Set 4	Set 5	Total
4 April	16:00	Iskra Odintsovo (Russia)	1–3	(Greece) Iraklis Thessaloniki	25–19	22–25	23–25	23–25		93–94
4 April	19:00	Trentino Volley (Italy)	3–0	(Italy) Lube Banca Marche Macerata	25–21	25–19	25–23			75–63

=== 3rd place match ===
Date	Time		Score		Set 1	Set 2	Set 3	Set 4	Set 5	Total
5 April	14:30	Iskra Odintsovo (Russia)	3–2	(Italy) Lube Banca Marche Macerata	25–23	25–23	28–30	21–25	17–15	116–116

=== Final ===
Date	Time		Score		Set 1	Set 2	Set 3	Set 4	Set 5	Total
5 April	17:30	Iraklis Thessaloniki (Greece)	1–3	(Italy) Trentino Volley	12–25	25–21	24–26	22–25		83–97

== Final standings ==
Qualified for the 2009 FIVB Club World Championship

Rank	Team
1st place, gold medalist(s)	(Italy) Trentino Volley
2nd place, silver medalist(s)	(Greece) Iraklis Thessaloniki
3rd place, bronze medalist(s)	(Russia) Iskra Odintsovo
4	(Italy) Lube Banca Marche Macerata

2008–09 CEV Champions League winners
(Italy)
Trentino Volley
1st title

== Awards ==
- Most valuable player
  (Bulgaria) Matey Kaziyski (Trentino Volley)
- Best scorer
  (Germany) Jochen Schöps (Iskra Odintsovo)
- Best spiker
  (Czech Republic) Martin Lébl (Lube Banca Marche Macerata)
- Best server
  (Italy) Emanuele Birarelli (Trentino Volley)
- Best blocker
  (Poland) Michał Winiarski (Trentino Volley)
- Best receiver
  (Bulgaria) Plamen Konstantinov (Iraklis Thessaloniki)
- Best libero
  (Russia) Aleksey Verbov (Iskra Odintsovo)
- Best setter
  (Russia) Aleksandr Butko (Iskra Odintsovo)
