= 2009–10 CEV Champions League =

- League: CEV Champions League
- Sport: Volleyball
- Duration: 1 December 2009 – 2 May 2010
- Teams: 24

Finals
- Venue: (Poland) Łódź
- Champions: (Italy) Trentino BetClic
- Finals MVP: (Cuba) Osmany Juantorena

CEV Champions League seasons
- ← 2008–09 2010–11 →

The 2009–10 CEV Champions League was the 51st edition of the highest level European volleyball club competition organised by the European Volleyball Confederation.

== Participating teams ==
Rank	Country	Number of teams	Teams
1	Italy	3	Trentino BetClic; Lube Banca Marche Macerata; CoprAtlantide Piacenza
2	Russia	2	Zenit Kazan; Dynamo Moscow
3	Poland	3	PGE Skra Bełchatów; Asseco Resovia; Jastrzębski Węgiel
4	Greece	2	Olympiacos Piraeus; Panathinaikos Athens
5	France	2	Paris Volley; Tours VB
6	Belgium	2	Noliko Maaseik; Knack Randstad Roeselare
7	Spain	2	CAI Teruel; Unicaja Almería
8	Germany	1	VfB Friedrichshafen
9	Austria	1	Hypo Tirol Innsbruck
10	Turkey	1	İstanbul BBSK
12	Czech Republic	1	Jihostroj České Budějovice
13	Serbia	1	Radnički Kragujevac
14	Montenegro	1	Budvanska Rivijera Budva
15	Slovenia	1	ACH Volley Bled
21	Bulgaria	1	CSKA Sofia

== League round ==
24 teams will be drawn to 6 pools of 4 teams each.
The 1st – 2nd ranked will qualify for the Playoffs 12.
The organizer of the Final Four will be determined after the end of the League Round and qualifies directly for the Final Four.
The team of the organizer of the Final Four will be replaced by the 3rd ranked team with the best score.
The four next 3rd ranked teams move to CEV Cup. The remaining teams are eliminated.

=== Pool A ===
Pos	Team	Pld	W	L	Pts	SW	SL	SR	SPW	SPL	SPR	Qualification
1	(Italy) Trentino BetClic	6	4	2	10	15	9	1.667	549	492	1.116	Playoffs
2	(Russia) Dynamo Moscow	6	4	2	10	14	9	1.556	537	495	1.085	Playoffs
3	(Greece) Olympiacos Piraeus	6	4	2	10	15	10	1.500	557	537	1.037	Playoffs
4	(Czech Republic) Jihostroj České Budějovice	6	0	6	6	2	18	0.111	386	507	0.761	

=== Pool B ===
Pos	Team	Pld	W	L	Pts	SW	SL	SR	SPW	SPL	SPR	Qualification
1	(Russia) Zenit Kazan	6	5	1	11	16	6	2.667	531	471	1.127	Playoffs
2	(Bulgaria) CSKA Sofia	6	3	3	9	10	14	0.714	504	538	0.937	Playoffs
3	(France) Tours VB	6	2	4	8	12	14	0.857	562	566	0.993	2009–10 CEV Cup
4	(Spain) Unicaja Almería	6	2	4	8	10	14	0.714	496	520	0.954	

=== Pool C ===
Pos	Team	Pld	W	L	Pts	SW	SL	SR	SPW	SPL	SPR	Qualification
1	(Italy) Lube Banca Marche Macerata	6	5	1	11	17	5	3.400	536	478	1.121	Playoffs
2	(Austria) Hypo Tirol Innsbruck	6	3	3	9	12	12	1.000	521	523	0.996	Playoffs
3	(Belgium) Noliko Maaseik	6	3	3	9	11	13	0.846	524	518	1.012	2009–10 CEV Cup
4	(Montenegro) Budvanska Rivijera Budva	6	1	5	7	7	17	0.412	520	582	0.893	

=== Pool D ===
Pos	Team	Pld	W	L	Pts	SW	SL	SR	SPW	SPL	SPR	Qualification
1	(Poland) PGE Skra Bełchatów (Note: Qualified as hosts) (H)	6	5	1	11	17	5	3.400	525	478	1.098	Final Four
2	(Belgium) Knack Randstad Roeselare	6	4	2	10	14	9	1.556	522	494	1.057	Playoffs
3	(Spain) CAI Teruel	6	3	3	9	11	12	0.917	522	512	1.020	2009–10 CEV Cup
4	(Serbia) Radnički Kragujevac	6	0	6	6	2	18	0.111	418	503	0.831	

(H) Host

=== Pool E ===
Pos	Team	Pld	W	L	Pts	SW	SL	SR	SPW	SPL	SPR	Qualification
1	(Germany) VfB Friedrichshafen	6	4	2	10	14	7	2.000	499	459	1.087	Playoffs
2	(Greece) Panathinaikos Athens	6	4	2	10	12	9	1.333	489	488	1.002	Playoffs
3	(Italy) CoprAtlantide Piacenza	6	2	4	8	10	12	0.833	496	488	1.016	2009–10 CEV Cup
4	(Poland) Jastrzębski Węgiel	6	2	4	8	8	16	0.500	518	567	0.914	

=== Pool F ===
Pos	Team	Pld	W	L	Pts	SW	SL	SR	SPW	SPL	SPR	Qualification
1	(Poland) Asseco Resovia	6	5	1	11	17	8	2.125	576	504	1.143	Playoffs
2	(Slovenia) ACH Volley Bled	6	3	3	9	12	13	0.923	530	542	0.978	Playoffs
3	(Turkey) İstanbul BBSK	6	2	4	8	10	12	0.833	480	499	0.962	
4	(France) Paris Volley	6	2	4	8	9	15	0.600	503	544	0.925	

== Playoffs ==
=== Playoffs 12 ===
Team 1	Agg.	Team 2	1st leg	2nd leg
Trentino BetClic (Italy)	6–2	(Belgium) Knack Randstad Roeselare	3–1	3–1
CSKA Sofia (Bulgaria)	1–6	(Poland) Asseco Resovia	1–3	0–3
VfB Friedrichshafen (Germany)	3–4	(Austria) Hypo Tirol Innsbruck	3–1	0–3
ACH Volley Bled (Slovenia)	6–4	(Italy) Lube Banca Marche Macerata	3–2	3–2
Dynamo Moscow (Russia)	6–2	(Greece) Panathinaikos Athens	3–0	3–2
Olympiacos Piraeus (Greece)	5–4	(Russia) Zenit Kazan	3–1	2–3

==== First leg ====
Date	Time		Score		Set 1	Set 2	Set 3	Set 4	Set 5	Total	Report
9 Feb	20:30	Trentino BetClic (Italy)	3–1	(Belgium) Knack Randstad Roeselare	25–19	21–25	25–18	25–22		96–84	Report
10 Feb	19:30	CSKA Sofia (Bulgaria)	1–3	(Poland) Asseco Resovia	19–25	16–25	25–22	22–25		82–97	Report
10 Feb	20:00	VfB Friedrichshafen (Germany)	3–1	(Austria) Hypo Tirol Innsbruck	26–28	25–16	25–23	25–14		101–81	Report
10 Feb	20:15	ACH Volley Bled (Slovenia)	3–2	(Italy) Lube Banca Marche Macerata	15–25	25–22	20–25	34–32	18–16	112–120	Report
10 Feb	19:00	Dynamo Moscow (Russia)	3–0	(Greece) Panathinaikos Athens	25–23	25–21	25–19			75–63	Report
10 Feb	18:00	Olympiacos Piraeus (Greece)	3–1	(Russia) Zenit Kazan	25–21	20–25	25–20	25–19		95–85	Report

==== Second leg ====
Date	Time		Score		Set 1	Set 2	Set 3	Set 4	Set 5	Total	Report
17 Feb	20:30	Knack Randstad Roeselare (Belgium)	1–3	(Italy) Trentino BetClic	26–28	25–18	21–25	14–25		86–96	Report
17 Feb	18:00	Asseco Resovia (Poland)	3–0	(Bulgaria) CSKA Sofia	25–20	25–15	25–18			75–53	Report
17 Feb	20:15	Hypo Tirol Innsbruck (Austria)	3–0	(Germany) VfB Friedrichshafen	25–22	25–18	25–17			75–57	Report
17 Feb	20:30	Lube Banca Marche Macerata (Italy)	2–3	(Slovenia) ACH Volley Bled	23–25	25–17	25–20	19–25	12–15	104–102	Report
18 Feb	18:00	Panathinaikos Athens (Greece)	2–3	(Russia) Dynamo Moscow	25–18	14–25	27–25	32–34	12–15	110–117	Report
17 Feb	19:00	Zenit Kazan (Russia)	3–2	(Greece) Olympiacos Piraeus	21–25	25–20	25–19	27–29	15–8	113–101	Report

=== Playoffs 6 ===
Team 1	Agg.	Team 2	1st leg	2nd leg	Golden Set
Trentino BetClic (Italy)	6–1	(Poland) Asseco Resovia	3–0	3–1	
Hypo Tirol Innsbruck (Austria)	4–4	(Slovenia) ACH Volley Bled	3–1	1–3	10–15
Dynamo Moscow (Russia)	6–2	(Greece) Olympiacos Piraeus	3–1	3–1	

==== First leg ====
Date	Time		Score		Set 1	Set 2	Set 3	Set 4	Set 5	Total	Report
3 Mar	19:00	Dynamo Moscow (Russia)	3–1	(Greece) Olympiacos Piraeus	25–16	22–25	25–22	25–22		97–85	Report
3 Mar	20:25	Hypo Tirol Innsbruck (Austria)	3–1	(Slovenia) ACH Volley Bled	25–20	26–24	14–25	25–19		90–88	Report
3 Mar	20:30	Trentino BetClic (Italy)	3–0	(Poland) Asseco Resovia	27–25	25–18	25–17			77–60	Report

==== Second leg ====
Date	Time		Score		Set 1	Set 2	Set 3	Set 4	Set 5	Total	Report
9 Mar	18:00	Asseco Resovia (Poland)	1–3	(Italy) Trentino BetClic	18–25	28–26	21–25	18–25		85–101	Report
10 Mar	18:30	Olympiacos Piraeus (Greece)	1–3	(Russia) Dynamo Moscow	32–34	17–25	25–16	27–29		101–104	Report
10 Mar	20:15	ACH Volley Bled (Slovenia)	3–1	(Austria) Hypo Tirol Innsbruck	25–20	19–25	25–20	25–19		94–84	Report
Golden set		ACH Volley Bled (Slovenia)	15–10	(Austria) Hypo Tirol Innsbruck							

== Final Four ==
- Organizer: (Poland) PGE Skra Bełchatów
- Place: Łódź
- All times are Central European Summer Time (UTC+02:00).
- The tournament was originally scheduled to be held on 10–11 April 2010, but was postponed because of the national mourning for President Lech Kaczyński and other Polish dignitaries who perished in the Smolensk air disaster.

Semifinals
1 May
(Poland) PGE Skra Bełchatów	1
(Russia) Dynamo Moscow	3
1 May
(Slovenia) ACH Volley Bled	1
(Italy) Trentino BetClic	3

Final
2 May
(Russia) Dynamo Moscow	0
(Italy) Trentino BetClic	3
3rd place match
2 May
(Poland) PGE Skra Bełchatów	3
(Slovenia) ACH Volley Bled	1

=== Semifinals ===
Date	Time		Score		Set 1	Set 2	Set 3	Set 4	Set 5	Total	Report
1 May	16:45	PGE Skra Bełchatów (Poland)	1–3	(Russia) Dynamo Moscow	25–23	19–25	21–25	17–25		82–98	Report
1 May	19:45	ACH Volley Bled (Slovenia)	1–3	(Italy) Trentino BetClic	13–25	25–23	21–25	17–25		76–98	Report

=== 3rd place match ===
Date	Time		Score		Set 1	Set 2	Set 3	Set 4	Set 5	Total	Report
2 May	11:30	PGE Skra Bełchatów (Poland)	3–1	(Slovenia) ACH Volley Bled	25–16	22–25	31–29	25–20		103–90	Report

=== Final ===
Date	Time		Score		Set 1	Set 2	Set 3	Set 4	Set 5	Total	Report
2 May	14:45	Dynamo Moscow (Russia)	0–3	(Italy) Trentino BetClic	12–25	20–25	21–25			53–75	Report

== Final standings ==
Qualified for the 2010 FIVB Club World Championship

Rank	Team
1st place, gold medalist(s)	(Italy) Trentino BetClic
2nd place, silver medalist(s)	(Russia) Dynamo Moscow
3rd place, bronze medalist(s)	(Poland) PGE Skra Bełchatów
4	(Slovenia) ACH Volley Bled

2009–10 CEV Champions League winners

2nd title

== Awards ==
- Most valuable player
  (Cuba) Osmany Juantorena (Trentino BetClic)
- Best scorer
  (Poland) Mariusz Wlazły (PGE Skra Bełchatów)
- Best spiker
  (Brazil) Dante Amaral (Dynamo Moscow)
- Best server
  (Cuba) Osmany Juantorena (Trentino BetClic)
- Best blocker
  (Slovenia) Matevž Kamnik (ACH Volley Bled)
- Best receiver
  (Canada) Daniel Lewis (ACH Volley Bled)
- Best libero
  (Italy) Andrea Bari (Trentino BetClic)
- Best setter
  (Poland) Łukasz Żygadło (Trentino BetClic)
