= Marcelo Méndez =

Marcelo Méndez may refer to:

- Marcelo Méndez (fencer)
- Marcelo Méndez (footballer)
- Marcelo Méndez (volleyball)

== See also ==
- Marcelo Mendes (disambiguation)
