= 2010–11 CEV Champions League =

- League: CEV Champions League
- Sport: Volleyball
- Duration: 16 October 2010 – 27 March 2011
- Teams: 24

Finals
- Venue: (Italy) Bolzano
- Champions: (Italy) Trentino BetClic
- Finals MVP: (Cuba) Osmany Juantorena

CEV Champions League seasons
- ← 2009–10 2011–12 →

The 2010–11 CEV Champions League was the 52nd edition of the highest level European volleyball club competition organised by the European Volleyball Confederation.

== Participating teams ==
Rank	Country	Number of teams	Teams
1	Italy	3	Bre Banca Lannutti Cuneo; Trentino BetClic; Sisley Treviso
2	Russia	3	Zenit Kazan; Lokomotiv Belgorod; Dynamo Moscow
3	Greece	2	Olympiacos Piraeus; Panathinaikos Athens
4	Poland	2	PGE Skra Bełchatów; Jastrzębski Węgiel
5	France	2	Tours VB; AS Cannes
6	Belgium	2	Knack Randstad Roeselare; Noliko Maaseik
7	Germany	2	VfB Friedrichshafen; Generali Unterhaching
8	Spain	1	CAI Teruel
9	Turkey	1	Fenerbahçe İstanbul
10	Austria	1	Hypo Tirol Innsbruck
12	Slovenia	1	ACH Volley Bled
13	Serbia	1	Radnički Kragujevac
15	Montenegro	1	Budvanska Rivijera Budva
16	Romania	1	Remat Zalău
20	Bulgaria	1	CSKA Sofia

== League round ==
- 24 teams were drawn to 6 pools of 4 teams each.
- The 1st – 2nd ranked qualified for the Playoffs 12.
- The organizer of the Final Four was determined after the end of the League Round and qualifies directly for the Final Four.
- The team of the organizer of the Final Four was replaced by the 3rd ranked team with the best score.
- The four next 3rd ranked teams moved to CEV Cup. The remaining teams were eliminated.
- All times are local.

=== Pool A ===
Pos	Team	Pld	W	L	Pts	SW	SL	SR	SPW	SPL	SPR	Qualification
1	(Russia) Zenit Kazan	6	4	2	13	16	8	2.000	548	477	1.149	Playoffs
2	(Germany) Generali Unterhaching	6	3	3	11	13	10	1.300	513	496	1.034	Playoffs
3	(Bulgaria) CSKA Sofia	6	3	3	7	11	15	0.733	518	567	0.914	2010–11 CEV Cup
4	(France) AS Cannes	6	2	4	5	9	16	0.563	527	566	0.931	

Date	Time		Score		Set 1	Set 2	Set 3	Set 4	Set 5	Total	Report
16 Nov	20:00	AS Cannes (France)	0–3	(Russia) Zenit Kazan	22–25	20–25	21–25			63–75	Report
17 Nov	20:30	Generali Unterhaching (Germany)	3–0	(Bulgaria) CSKA Sofia	25–18	25–18	25–14			75–50	Report
24 Nov	19:00	Zenit Kazan (Russia)	3–0	(Germany) Generali Unterhaching	25–14	25–18	25–21			75–53	Report
24 Nov	19:30	CSKA Sofia (Bulgaria)	3–2	(France) AS Cannes	21–25	25–17	27–25	18–25	15–6	106–98	Report
8 Dec	19:30	CSKA Sofia (Bulgaria)	3–2	(Russia) Zenit Kazan	25–23	16–25	25–23	22–25	15–10	103–106	Report
8 Dec	20:30	Generali Unterhaching (Germany)	3–1	(France) AS Cannes	25–27	25–20	25–18	25–19		100–84	Report
14 Dec	20:00	AS Cannes (France)	0–3	(Germany) Generali Unterhaching	24–26	21–25	24–26			69–77	Report
15 Dec	20:15	Zenit Kazan (Russia)	3–0	(Bulgaria) CSKA Sofia	25–8	25–19	25–23			75–50	Report
5 Jan	20:00	AS Cannes (France)	3–2	(Bulgaria) CSKA Sofia	20–25	25–19	22–25	25–15	16–14	108–98	Report
5 Jan	20:30	Generali Unterhaching (Germany)	2–3	(Russia) Zenit Kazan	25–20	23–25	22–25	25–22	8–15	103–107	Report
12 Jan	18:30	Zenit Kazan (Russia)	2–3	(France) AS Cannes	25–20	23–25	24–26	25–19	13–15	110–105	Report
12 Jan	19:30	CSKA Sofia (Bulgaria)	3–2	(Germany) Generali Unterhaching	23–25	25–22	23–25	25–23	15–10	111–105	Report

=== Pool B ===
Pos	Team	Pld	W	L	Pts	SPW	SPL	SPR	SW	SL	SR	Qualification
1	(Belgium) Noliko Maaseik	6	5	1	15	522	462	1.130	15	7	2.143	Playoffs
2	(Italy) Bre Banca Lannutti Cuneo	6	5	1	14	520	439	1.185	16	6	2.667	Playoffs
3	(Spain) CAI Teruel	6	2	4	7	535	543	0.985	11	13	0.846	2010–11 CEV Cup
4	(Serbia) Radnički Kragujevac	6	0	6	0	365	498	0.733	2	18	0.111	

Date	Time		Score		Set 1	Set 2	Set 3	Set 4	Set 5	Total	Report
17 Nov	20:15	CAI Teruel (Spain)	2–3	(Italy) Bre Banca Lannutti Cuneo	16–25	25–20	25–23	21–25	12–15	99–108	Report
18 Nov	18:00	Radnički Kragujevac (Serbia)	1–3	(Belgium) Noliko Maaseik	18–25	16–25	25–23	19–25		78–98	Report
23 Nov	20:30	Noliko Maaseik (Belgium)	3–1	(Spain) CAI Teruel	25–17	25–15	24–26	25–20		99–78	Report
24 Nov	20:30	Bre Banca Lannutti Cuneo (Italy)	3–0	(Serbia) Radnički Kragujevac	25–21	25–20	25–12			75–53	Report
8 Dec	18:00	CAI Teruel (Spain)	3–0	(Serbia) Radnički Kragujevac	25–17	25–16	25–15			75–48	Report
8 Dec	18:00	Bre Banca Lannutti Cuneo (Italy)	3–0	(Belgium) Noliko Maaseik	25–18	25–19	25–17			75–54	Report
14 Dec	20:30	Noliko Maaseik (Belgium)	3–1	(Italy) Bre Banca Lannutti Cuneo	25–22	15–25	25–18	25–23		90–88	Report
15 Dec	19:30	Radnički Kragujevac (Serbia)	1–3	(Spain) CAI Teruel	23–25	27–25	19–25	14–25		83–100	Report
5 Jan	18:00	Radnički Kragujevac (Serbia)	0–3	(Italy) Bre Banca Lannutti Cuneo	19–25	20–25	18–25			57–75	Report
6 Jan	18:00	CAI Teruel (Spain)	1–3	(Belgium) Noliko Maaseik	28–30	28–26	19–25	22–25		97–106	Report
12 Jan	20:30	Noliko Maaseik (Belgium)	3–0	(Serbia) Radnički Kragujevac	25–16	25–14	25–16			75–46	Report
12 Jan	20:30	Bre Banca Lannutti Cuneo (Italy)	3–1	(Spain) CAI Teruel	24–26	25–20	25–18	25–22		99–86	Report

=== Pool C ===
Pos	Team	Pld	W	L	Pts	SPW	SPL	SPR	SW	SL	SR	Qualification
1	(Poland) Jastrzębski Węgiel	6	3	3	11	541	509	1.063	14	9	1.556	Playoffs
2	(Slovenia) ACH Volley Bled	6	4	2	11	566	538	1.052	14	11	1.273	Playoffs
3	(Montenegro) Budvanska Rivijera Budva	6	4	2	9	517	530	0.975	12	12	1.000	Playoffs
4	(Greece) Olympiacos Piraeus	6	1	5	5	553	600	0.922	9	17	0.529	

Date	Time		Score		Set 1	Set 2	Set 3	Set 4	Set 5	Total	Report
17 Nov	17:30	Jastrzębski Węgiel (Poland)	1–3	(Slovenia) ACH Volley Bled	22–25	21–25	25–21	26–28		94–99	Report
17 Nov	20:00	Budvanska Rivijera Budva (Montenegro)	3–0	(Greece) Olympiacos Piraeus	27–25	25–21	25–20			77–66	Report
24 Nov	19:30	Olympiacos Piraeus (Greece)	3–2	(Poland) Jastrzębski Węgiel	28–26	25–22	23–25	17–25	15–13	108–111	Report
24 Nov	20:15	ACH Volley Bled (Slovenia)	3–0	(Montenegro) Budvanska Rivijera Budva	25–21	25–19	25–16			75–56	Report
8 Dec	19:30	Olympiacos Piraeus (Greece)	2–3	(Slovenia) ACH Volley Bled	20–25	25–22	25–20	31–33	9–15	110–115	Report
8 Dec	20:00	Budvanska Rivijera Budva (Montenegro)	3–2	(Poland) Jastrzębski Węgiel	25–20	28–26	23–25	24–26	16–14	116–111	Report
14 Dec	20:15	ACH Volley Bled (Slovenia)	3–2	(Greece) Olympiacos Piraeus	25–20	25–21	23–25	23–25	15–11	111–102	Report
15 Dec	17:30	Jastrzębski Węgiel (Poland)	3–0	(Montenegro) Budvanska Rivijera Budva	25–23	25–20	25–13			75–56	Report
5 Jan	17:30	Jastrzębski Węgiel (Poland)	3–0	(Greece) Olympiacos Piraeus	25–23	25–20	25–22			75–65	Report
5 Jan	20:00	Budvanska Rivijera Budva (Montenegro)	3–2	(Slovenia) ACH Volley Bled	25–22	21–25	25–17	15–25	15–12	101–101	Report
12 Jan	19:30	Olympiacos Piraeus (Greece)	2–3	(Montenegro) Budvanska Rivijera Budva	26–24	17–25	25–17	28–30	6–15	102–111	Report
12 Jan	20:15	ACH Volley Bled (Slovenia)	0–3	(Poland) Jastrzębski Węgiel	21–25	21–25	23–25			65–75	Report

=== Pool D ===
Pos	Team	Pld	W	L	Pts	SPW	SPL	SPR	SW	SL	SR	Qualification
1	(Poland) PGE Skra Bełchatów	6	5	1	15	468	403	1.161	16	3	5.333	Playoffs
2	(Italy) Trentino BetClic	6	4	2	12	520	490	1.061	14	9	1.556	Final Four
3	(Germany) VfB Friedrichshafen	6	3	3	9	504	491	1.026	11	12	0.917	2010–11 CEV Cup
4	(Romania) Remat Zalău	6	0	6	0	365	473	0.772	1	18	0.056	

Date	Time		Score		Set 1	Set 2	Set 3	Set 4	Set 5	Total	Report
17 Nov	17:00	Remat Zalău (Romania)	0–3	(Poland) PGE Skra Bełchatów	23–25	21–25	18–25			62–75	Report
17 Nov	20:30	Trentino BetClic (Italy)	3–2	(Germany) VfB Friedrichshafen	18–25	25–18	23–25	25–22	15–10	106–100	Report
24 Nov	18:00	PGE Skra Bełchatów (Poland)	3–0	(Italy) Trentino BetClic	31–29	25–18	25–22			81–69	Report
24 Nov	20:00	VfB Friedrichshafen (Germany)	3–1	(Romania) Remat Zalău	23–25	25–19	25–15	25–11		98–70	Report
8 Dec	17:00	Remat Zalău (Romania)	0–3	(Italy) Trentino BetClic	15–25	14–25	20–25			49–75	Report
8 Dec	18:00	PGE Skra Bełchatów (Poland)	3–0	(Germany) VfB Friedrichshafen	25–22	25–21	25–21			75–64	Report
12 Dec	16:30	VfB Friedrichshafen (Germany)	0–3	(Poland) PGE Skra Bełchatów	20–25	19–25	18–25			57–75	Report
13 Dec	20:30	Trentino BetClic (Italy)	3–0	(Romania) Remat Zalău	25–18	25–22	25–23			75–63	Report
5 Jan	20:30	Trentino BetClic (Italy)	3–1	(Poland) PGE Skra Bełchatów	25–23	25–23	21–25	25–16		96–87	Report
6 Jan	19:00	Remat Zalău (Romania)	0–3	(Germany) VfB Friedrichshafen	23–25	21–25	22–25			66–75	Report
12 Jan	18:00	PGE Skra Bełchatów (Poland)	3–0	(Romania) Remat Zalău	25–19	25–14	25–22			75–55	Report
12 Jan	19:15	VfB Friedrichshafen (Germany)	3–2	(Italy) Trentino BetClic	23–25	25–20	22–25	25–19	15–10	110–99	Report

=== Pool E ===
Pos	Team	Pld	W	L	Pts	SPW	SPL	SPR	SW	SL	SR	Qualification
1	(Russia) Lokomotiv Belgorod	6	4	2	13	512	491	1.043	14	8	1.750	Playoffs
2	(France) Tours VB	6	5	1	12	585	560	1.045	16	9	1.778	Playoffs
3	(Italy) Sisley Treviso	6	2	4	7	587	604	0.972	11	15	0.733	2010–11 CEV Cup
4	(Turkey) Fenerbahçe İstanbul	6	1	5	4	522	551	0.947	7	16	0.438	

Date	Time		Score		Set 1	Set 2	Set 3	Set 4	Set 5	Total	Report
17 Nov	19:00	Lokomotiv Belgorod (Russia)	2–3	(France) Tours VB	23–25	36–34	23–25	25–18	10–15	117–117	Report
17 Nov	19:30	Fenerbahçe İstanbul (Turkey)	2–3	(Italy) Sisley Treviso	23–25	25–20	26–28	25–23	11–15	110–111	Report
25 Nov	20:00	Tours VB (France)	1–3	(Turkey) Fenerbahçe İstanbul	25–21	22–25	22–25	23–25		92–96	Report
25 Nov	20:30	Sisley Treviso (Italy)	0–3	(Russia) Lokomotiv Belgorod	25–27	20–25	15–25			60–77	Report
7 Dec	19:00	Lokomotiv Belgorod (Russia)	3–0	(Turkey) Fenerbahçe İstanbul	26–24	25–23	25–19			76–66	Report
8 Dec	20:00	Tours VB (France)	3–2	(Italy) Sisley Treviso	24–26	27–25	19–25	25–22	18–16	113–114	Report
15 Dec	19:30	Fenerbahçe İstanbul (Turkey)	1–3	(Russia) Lokomotiv Belgorod	25–20	18–25	21–25	23–25		87–95	Report
16 Dec	20:30	Sisley Treviso (Italy)	2–3	(France) Tours VB	25–20	23–25	23–25	29–27	14–16	114–113	Report
5 Jan	19:00	Lokomotiv Belgorod (Russia)	3–1	(Italy) Sisley Treviso	25–20	19–25	25–20	25–21		94–86	Report
5 Jan	19:30	Fenerbahçe İstanbul (Turkey)	0–3	(France) Tours VB	21–25	22–25	23–25			66–75	Report
12 Jan	20:00	Tours VB (France)	3–0	(Russia) Lokomotiv Belgorod	25–19	25–15	25–19			75–53	Report
12 Jan	20:30	Sisley Treviso (Italy)	3–1	(Turkey) Fenerbahçe İstanbul	26–28	25–23	25–22	26–24		102–97	Report

=== Pool F ===
Pos	Team	Pld	W	L	Pts	SPW	SPL	SPR	SW	SL	SR	Qualification
1	(Russia) Dynamo Moscow	6	5	1	14	545	506	1.077	16	7	2.286	Playoffs
2	(Belgium) Knack Randstad Roeselare	6	4	2	10	536	513	1.045	13	11	1.182	Playoffs
3	(Austria) Hypo Tirol Innsbruck	6	2	4	7	499	522	0.956	9	13	0.692	
4	(Greece) Panathinaikos Athens	6	1	5	5	512	551	0.929	8	15	0.533	

Date	Time		Score		Set 1	Set 2	Set 3	Set 4	Set 5	Total	Report
16 Nov	18:00	Panathinaikos Athens (Greece)	2–3	(Russia) Dynamo Moscow	28–30	21–25	27–25	25–22	15–17	116–119	Report
17 Nov	20:30	Knack Randstad Roeselare (Belgium)	3–2	(Austria) Hypo Tirol Innsbruck	22–25	25–23	22–25	25–20	15–9	109–102	Report
23 Nov	19:00	Dynamo Moscow (Russia)	3–1	(Belgium) Knack Randstad Roeselare	17–25	25–18	25–23	25–20		92–86	Report
25 Nov	20:15	Hypo Tirol Innsbruck (Austria)	3–1	(Greece) Panathinaikos Athens	25–17	30–32	25–17	25–17		105–83	Report
8 Dec	20:30	Knack Randstad Roeselare (Belgium)	3–2	(Greece) Panathinaikos Athens	25–17	25–16	21–25	20–25	15–9	106–92	Report
9 Dec	20:15	Hypo Tirol Innsbruck (Austria)	0–3	(Russia) Dynamo Moscow	18–25	24–26	18–25			60–76	Report
14 Dec	12:00	Dynamo Moscow (Russia)	3–1	(Austria) Hypo Tirol Innsbruck	25–21	25–20	23–25	25–15		98–81	Report
14 Dec	18:00	Panathinaikos Athens (Greece)	3–0	(Belgium) Knack Randstad Roeselare	25–23	25–16	25–23			75–62	Report
4 Jan	18:00	Panathinaikos Athens (Greece)	0–3	(Austria) Hypo Tirol Innsbruck	23–25	25–27	30–32			78–84	Report
5 Jan	20:30	Knack Randstad Roeselare (Belgium)	3–1	(Russia) Dynamo Moscow	25–23	25–21	20–25	25–16		95–85	Report
12 Jan	20:30	Dynamo Moscow (Russia)	3–0	(Greece) Panathinaikos Athens	25–22	25–23	25–23			75–68	Report
12 Jan	20:15	Hypo Tirol Innsbruck (Austria)	0–3	(Belgium) Knack Randstad Roeselare	26–28	20–25	21–25			67–78	Report

== Playoffs ==
=== Playoff 12 ===
Team 1	Agg.	Team 2	1st leg	2nd leg	Golden Set
Bre Banca Lannutti Cuneo (Italy)	2–0	(Russia) Lokomotiv Belgorod	3–0	3–1	
Tours VB (France)	1–1	(Russia) Dynamo Moscow	3–2	1–3	11–15
Knack Randstad Roeselare (Belgium)	1–1	(Poland) PGE Skra Bełchatów	3–1	0–3	12–15
ACH Volley Bled (Slovenia)	0–2	(Russia) Zenit Kazan	0–3	0–3	
Generali Unterhaching (Germany)	1–1	(Poland) Jastrzębski Węgiel	3–1	1–3	9–15
Budvanska Rivijera Budva (Montenegro)	0–2	(Belgium) Noliko Maaseik	1–3	1–3	

==== First leg ====
Date	Time		Score		Set 1	Set 2	Set 3	Set 4	Set 5	Total	Report
2 Feb	20:30	Bre Banca Lannutti Cuneo (Italy)	3–0	(Russia) Lokomotiv Belgorod	25–23	25–16	25–20			75–59	Report
3 Feb	20:00	Tours VB (France)	3–2	(Russia) Dynamo Moscow	20–25	18–25	25–19	25–23	15–6	103–98	Report
2 Feb	20:30	Knack Randstad Roeselare (Belgium)	3–1	(Poland) PGE Skra Bełchatów	26–24	23–25	25–23	25–21		99–93	Report
2 Feb	20:15	ACH Volley Bled (Slovenia)	0–3	(Russia) Zenit Kazan	21–25	18–25	16–25			55–75	Report
2 Feb	19:00	Generali Unterhaching (Germany)	3–1	(Poland) Jastrzębski Węgiel	25–22	25–20	20–25	25–19		95–86	Report
1 Feb	20:00	Budvanska Rivijera Budva (Montenegro)	1–3	(Belgium) Noliko Maaseik	29–27	21–25	22–25	20–25		92–102	Report

==== Second leg ====
Date	Time		Score		Set 1	Set 2	Set 3	Set 4	Set 5	Total	Report
9 Feb	18:00	Lokomotiv Belgorod (Russia)	1–3	(Italy) Bre Banca Lannutti Cuneo	25–21	13–25	21–25	18–25		77–96	Report
8 Feb	19:00	Dynamo Moscow (Russia)	3–1	(France) Tours VB	25–21	25–23	18–25	25–22		93–91	Report
Golden set		Dynamo Moscow (Russia)	15–11	(France) Tours VB							
9 Feb	18:00	PGE Skra Bełchatów (Poland)	3–0	(Belgium) Knack Randstad Roeselare	25–21	25–17	25–15			75–53	Report
Golden set		PGE Skra Bełchatów (Poland)	15–12	(Belgium) Knack Randstad Roeselare							
9 Feb	20:00	Zenit Kazan (Russia)	3–0	(Slovenia) ACH Volley Bled	25–17	25–22	25–18			75–57	Report
8 Feb	18:00	Jastrzębski Węgiel (Poland)	3–1	(Germany) Generali Unterhaching	25–21	25–22	22–25	25–19		97–87	Report
Golden set		Jastrzębski Węgiel (Poland)	15–9	(Germany) Generali Unterhaching							
8 Feb	20:30	Noliko Maaseik (Belgium)	3–1	(Montenegro) Budvanska Rivijera Budva	25–18	23–25	25–17	28–26		101–86	Report

=== Playoff 6 ===
Team 1	Agg.	Team 2	1st leg	2nd leg	Golden Set
Bre Banca Lannutti Cuneo (Italy)	1–1	(Russia) Dynamo Moscow	1–3	3–1	11–15
PGE Skra Bełchatów (Poland)	1–1	(Russia) Zenit Kazan	2–3	3–1	11–15
Jastrzębski Węgiel (Poland)	1–1	(Belgium) Noliko Maaseik	3–2	0–3	17–15

==== First leg ====
Date	Time		Score		Set 1	Set 2	Set 3	Set 4	Set 5	Total	Report
2 Mar	20:30	Bre Banca Lannutti Cuneo (Italy)	1–3	(Russia) Dynamo Moscow	25–21	22–25	22–25	22–25		91–96	Report
2 Mar	18:00	PGE Skra Bełchatów (Poland)	2–3	(Russia) Zenit Kazan	25–17	27–29	25–21	17–25	8–15	102–107	Report
1 Mar	18:00	Jastrzębski Węgiel (Poland)	3–2	(Belgium) Noliko Maaseik	17–25	25–19	19–25	25–23	15–7	101–99	Report

==== Second leg ====
Date	Time		Score		Set 1	Set 2	Set 3	Set 4	Set 5	Total	Report
10 Mar	19:00	Dynamo Moscow (Russia)	1–3	(Italy) Bre Banca Lannutti Cuneo	22–25	25–23	17–25	17–25		81–98	Report
Golden set		Dynamo Moscow (Russia)	15–11	(Italy) Bre Banca Lannutti Cuneo							
9 Mar	18:00	Zenit Kazan (Russia)	1–3	(Poland) PGE Skra Bełchatów	22–25	25–17	23–25	19–25		89–92	Report
Golden set		Zenit Kazan (Russia)	15–11	(Poland) PGE Skra Bełchatów							
8 Mar	20:30	Noliko Maaseik (Belgium)	3–0	(Poland) Jastrzębski Węgiel	25–12	25–16	25–23			75–51	Report
Golden set		Noliko Maaseik (Belgium)	15–17	(Poland) Jastrzębski Węgiel							

== Final Four ==
- Organizer: (Italy) Trentino BetClic
- Place: Bolzano
- All times on 26 March are Central European Time (UTC+01:00) and all times on 27 March are Central European Summer Time (UTC+02:00).

Semifinals
26 March
(Poland) Jastrzębski Węgiel	0
(Italy) Trentino BetClic	3
26 March
(Russia) Dynamo Moscow	0
(Russia) Zenit Kazan	3

Final
27 March
(Italy) Trentino BetClic	3
(Russia) Zenit Kazan	1
3rd place match
27 March
(Poland) Jastrzębski Węgiel	1
(Russia) Dynamo Moscow	3

=== Semifinals ===
Date	Time		Score		Set 1	Set 2	Set 3	Set 4	Set 5	Total	Report
26 Mar	15:00	Jastrzębski Węgiel (Poland)	0–3	(Italy) Trentino BetClic	16–25	25–27	22–25			63–77	Report
26 Mar	18:00	Dynamo Moscow (Russia)	0–3	(Russia) Zenit Kazan	24–26	20–25	21–25			65–76	Report

=== 3rd place match ===
Date	Time		Score		Set 1	Set 2	Set 3	Set 4	Set 5	Total	Report
27 Mar	14:30	Jastrzębski Węgiel (Poland)	1–3	(Russia) Dynamo Moscow	25–23	22–25	16–25	21–25		84–98	Report

=== Final ===
Date	Time		Score		Set 1	Set 2	Set 3	Set 4	Set 5	Total	Report
27 Mar	18:00	Trentino BetClic (Italy)	3–1	(Russia) Zenit Kazan	25–17	20–25	25–23	25–20		95–85	Report

== Final standings ==
Qualified for the 2011 FIVB Club World Championship

Rank	Team
1st place, gold medalist(s)	(Italy) Trentino BetClic
2nd place, silver medalist(s)	(Russia) Zenit Kazan
3rd place, bronze medalist(s)	(Russia) Dynamo Moscow
4	(Poland) Jastrzębski Węgiel

2010–11 CEV Champions League winners

3rd title

== Awards ==
- Most valuable player
  (Cuba) Osmany Juantorena (Trentino BetClic)
- Best scorer
  (Russia) Maxim Mikhaylov (Zenit Kazan)
- Best spiker
  (Bulgaria) Matey Kaziyski (Trentino BetClic)
- Best server
  (Russia) Sergey Tetyukhin (Zenit Kazan)
- Best blocker
  (Russia) Aleksandr Abrosimov (Zenit Kazan)
- Best receiver
  (Hungary) Péter Veres (Dynamo Moscow)
- Best libero
  (Italy) Andrea Bari (Trentino BetClic)
- Best setter
  (United States) Lloy Ball (Zenit Kazan)
