= 2011–12 CEV Champions League =

- League: CEV Champions League
- Sport: Volleyball
- Duration: 18 October 2011 – 18 March 2012
- Teams: 24

Finals
- Venue: (Poland) Łódź
- Champions: (Russia) Zenit Kazan
- Finals MVP: (Poland) Mariusz Wlazły

CEV Champions League seasons
- ← 2010–11 2012–13 →

The 2011–12 CEV Champions League was the 53rd edition of the highest level European volleyball club competition organised by the European Volleyball Confederation.

== Participating teams ==
Rank	Country	Number of teams	Teams
1	Italy	3	Trentino PlanetWin365; Bre Banca Lannutti Cuneo; Lube Banca Marche Macerata
2	Russia	2	Zenit Kazan; Lokomotiv Novosibirsk
3	Greece	1	Iraklis Thessaloniki
4	Poland	2	PGE Skra Bełchatów; ZAKSA Kędzierzyn-Koźle
5	France	2	Tours VB; Stade Poitevin Poitiers
6	Belgium	2	Euphony Asse-Lennik; Noliko Maaseik
7	Turkey	2	Fenerbahçe Grundig İstanbul; Arkas İzmir
8	Spain	1	CAI Teruel
9	Germany	2	VfB Friedrichshafen; Generali Unterhaching
10	Austria	1	Hypo Tirol Innsbruck
11	Slovenia	1	ACH Volley Ljubljana
12	Serbia	1	Partizan Termoelektro Beograd
13	Czech Republic	1	Jihostroj České Budějovice
15	Montenegro	1	Budvanska Rivijera Budva
16	Romania	1	Remat Zalău
17	Bulgaria	1	CSKA Sofia

== League round ==
24 teams were drawn to 6 pools of 4 teams each.
The 1st – 2nd ranked qualified for the Playoffs 12.
The organizer of the Final Four were determined after the end of the League Round and qualified directly for the Final Four.
The team of the organizer of the Final Four was replaced by the 3rd ranked team with the best score.
The four next 3rd ranked teams moved to the CEV Cup. The remaining teams are eliminated.

- All times are local.

=== Pool A ===
Pos	Team	Pld	W	L	Pts	SW	SL	SR	SPW	SPL	SPR	Qualification
1	(Turkey) Arkas İzmir	6	5	1	15	16	6	2.667	544	479	1.136	Playoffs
2	(Belgium) Noliko Maaseik	6	4	2	12	15	10	1.500	586	529	1.108	Playoffs
3	(Greece) Iraklis Thessaloniki	6	3	3	8	10	12	0.833	469	510	0.920	2011–12 CEV Cup
4	(Bulgaria) CSKA Sofia	6	0	6	1	5	18	0.278	460	541	0.850	

Date	Time		Score		Set 1	Set 2	Set 3	Set 4	Set 5	Total	Report
19 Oct	19:00	Arkas İzmir (Turkey)	3–1	(Bulgaria) CSKA Sofia	20–25	25–21	25–11	25–13		95–70	Report
19 Oct	20:00	Iraklis Thessaloniki (Greece)	3–2	(Belgium) Noliko Maaseik	25–23	27–25	14–25	22–25	15–11	103–109	Report
25 Oct	19:00	CSKA Sofia (Bulgaria)	0–3	(Greece) Iraklis Thessaloniki	19–25	21–25	21–25			61–75	Report
25 Oct	20:30	Noliko Maaseik (Belgium)	3–1	(Turkey) Arkas İzmir	23–25	27–25	25–20	25–21		100–91	Report
13 Dec	20:30	Noliko Maaseik (Belgium)	3–1	(Bulgaria) CSKA Sofia	25–27	25–16	25–22	25–20		100–85	Report
14 Dec	20:00	Iraklis Thessaloniki (Greece)	0–3	(Turkey) Arkas İzmir	19–25	21–25	23–25			63–75	Report
21 Dec	19:00	CSKA Sofia (Bulgaria)	2–3	(Belgium) Noliko Maaseik	26–24	16–25	25–16	20–25	12–15	99–105	Report
21 Dec	19:00	Arkas İzmir (Turkey)	3–1	(Greece) Iraklis Thessaloniki	25–27	25–22	25–14	29–27		104–90	Report
11 Jan	19:00	Arkas İzmir (Turkey)	3–1	(Belgium) Noliko Maaseik	25–27	29–27	25–23	25–20		104–97	Report
11 Jan	20:00	Iraklis Thessaloniki (Greece)	3–1	(Bulgaria) CSKA Sofia	25–21	25–19	16–25	25–21		91–86	Report
18 Jan	19:00	CSKA Sofia (Bulgaria)	0–3	(Turkey) Arkas İzmir	17–25	23–25	19–25			59–75	Report
18 Jan	20:30	Noliko Maaseik (Belgium)	3–0	(Greece) Iraklis Thessaloniki	25–17	25–14	25–16			75–47	Report

=== Pool B ===
Pos	Team	Pld	W	L	Pts	SW	SL	SR	SPW	SPL	SPR	Qualification
1	(Russia) Zenit Kazan	6	5	1	15	17	5	3.400	502	447	1.123	Playoffs
2	(Germany) VfB Friedrichshafen	6	5	1	14	15	8	1.875	567	531	1.068	Playoffs
3	(Romania) Remat Zalău	6	1	5	4	6	15	0.400	447	496	0.901	2011–12 CEV Cup
4	(Belgium) Euphony Asse-Lennik	6	1	5	3	7	17	0.412	539	581	0.928	

Date	Time		Score		Set 1	Set 2	Set 3	Set 4	Set 5	Total	Report
18 Oct	20:30	Euphony Asse-Lennik (Belgium)	3–2	(Romania) Remat Zalău	23–25	25–18	23–25	25–20	15–13	111–101	Report
19 Oct	19:00	Zenit Kazan (Russia)	3–0	(Germany) VfB Friedrichshafen	25–20	25–23	25–22			75–65	Report
25 Oct	16:30	Remat Zalău (Romania)	0–3	(Russia) Zenit Kazan	22–25	16–25	22–25			60–75	Report
26 Oct	20:15	VfB Friedrichshafen (Germany)	3–1	(Belgium) Euphony Asse-Lennik	25–27	29–27	42–40	25–18		121–112	Report
14 Dec	18:00	Zenit Kazan (Russia)	3–0	(Belgium) Euphony Asse-Lennik	25–21	25–21	25–18			75–60	Report
14 Dec	20:30	VfB Friedrichshafen (Germany)	3–0	(Romania) Remat Zalău	25–22	25–16	25–17			75–55	Report
20 Dec	20:30	Euphony Asse-Lennik (Belgium)	2–3	(Russia) Zenit Kazan	21–25	25–19	12–25	25–22	14–16	97–107	Report
21 Dec	19:00	Remat Zalău (Romania)	1–3	(Germany) VfB Friedrichshafen	25–23	22–25	23–25	25–27		95–100	Report
10 Jan	20:30	Euphony Asse-Lennik (Belgium)	1–3	(Germany) VfB Friedrichshafen	30–32	23–25	25–20	21–25		99–102	Report
11 Jan	20:00	Zenit Kazan (Russia)	3–0	(Romania) Remat Zalău	25–21	25–20	25–20			75–61	Report
18 Jan	19:00	Remat Zalău (Romania)	3–0	(Belgium) Euphony Asse-Lennik	25–20	25–20	25–20			75–60	Report
18 Jan	20:00	VfB Friedrichshafen (Germany)	3–2	(Russia) Zenit Kazan	18–25	25–18	25–20	21–25	15–7	104–95	Report

=== Pool C ===
Pos	Team	Pld	W	L	Pts	SW	SL	SR	SPW	SPL	SPR	Qualification
1	(Italy) Trentino PlanetWin365	6	5	1	16	17	3	5.667	484	391	1.238	Playoffs
2	(Poland) ZAKSA Kędzierzyn-Koźle	6	5	1	13	15	9	1.667	551	512	1.076	Playoffs
3	(Spain) CAI Teruel	6	1	5	4	6	16	0.375	460	513	0.897	
4	(Serbia) Partizan Termoelektro Beograd	6	1	5	3	7	17	0.412	477	556	0.858	

Date	Time		Score		Set 1	Set 2	Set 3	Set 4	Set 5	Total	Report
19 Oct	18:00	ZAKSA Kędzierzyn-Koźle (Poland)	3–1	(Serbia) Partizan	25–20	25–18	21–25	25–16		96–79	Report
20 Oct	20:30	Trentino PlanetWin365 (Italy)	3–0	(Spain) CAI Teruel	25–22	26–24	25–14			76–60	Report
25 Oct	18:00	Partizan (Serbia)	0–3	(Italy) Trentino PlanetWin365	18–25	14–25	19–25			51–75	Report
26 Oct	20:15	CAI Teruel (Spain)	1–3	(Poland) ZAKSA Kędzierzyn-Koźle	22–25	16–25	28–26	24–26		90–102	Report
14 Dec	20:15	CAI Teruel (Spain)	3–1	(Serbia) Partizan	25–14	25–14	18–25	26–24		94–77	Report
14 Dec	20:30	Trentino PlanetWin365 (Italy)	2–3	(Poland) ZAKSA Kędzierzyn-Koźle	23–25	17–25	25–23	26–24	17–19	108–116	Report
20 Dec	18:00	Partizan (Serbia)	3–2	(Spain) CAI Teruel	25–18	25–27	25–23	17–25	15–12	107–105	Report
22 Dec	18:00	ZAKSA Kędzierzyn-Koźle (Poland)	0–3	(Italy) Trentino PlanetWin365	20–25	21–25	9–25			50–75	Report
10 Jan	18:00	ZAKSA Kędzierzyn-Koźle (Poland)	3–0	(Spain) CAI Teruel	25–14	26–24	25–15			76–53	Report
11 Jan	20:30	Trentino PlanetWin365 (Italy)	3–0	(Serbia) Partizan	25–16	25–20	25–20			75–56	Report
18 Jan	20:00	Partizan (Serbia)	2–3	(Poland) ZAKSA Kędzierzyn-Koźle	25–23	18–25	25–20	23–25	16–18	107–111	Report
18 Jan	20:15	CAI Teruel (Spain)	0–3	(Italy) Trentino PlanetWin365	22–25	16–25	20–25			58–75	Report

=== Pool D ===
Pos	Team	Pld	W	L	Pts	SW	SL	SR	SPW	SPL	SPR	Qualification
1	(Italy) Bre Banca Lannutti Cuneo	6	4	2	12	12	7	1.714	453	420	1.079	Playoffs
2	(France) Stade Poitevin Poitiers	6	4	2	11	12	11	1.091	507	514	0.986	Playoffs
3	(Germany) Generali Unterhaching	6	3	3	9	13	12	1.083	562	540	1.041	Playoffs
4	(Czech Republic) Jihostroj České Budějovice	6	1	5	4	8	15	0.533	494	542	0.911	

Date	Time		Score		Set 1	Set 2	Set 3	Set 4	Set 5	Total	Report
19 Oct	18:00	České Budějovice (Czech Republic)	1–3	(France) Stade Poitevin Poitiers	20–25	25–22	14–25	20–25		79–97	Report
19 Oct	20:00	Generali Unterhaching (Germany)	1–3	(Italy) Cuneo	25–16	16–25	23–25	23–25		87–91	Report
26 Oct	20:30	Cuneo (Italy)	0–3	(Czech Republic) České Budějovice	28–30	20–25	23–25			71–80	Report
27 Oct	20:00	Stade Poitevin Poitiers (France)	3–1	(Germany) Generali Unterhaching	18–25	25–21	28–26	25–23		96–95	Report
13 Dec	18:00	České Budějovice (Czech Republic)	1–3	(Germany) Generali Unterhaching	25–18	21–25	20–25	20–25		86–93	Report
13 Dec	20:00	Stade Poitevin Poitiers (France)	0–3	(Italy) Cuneo	19–25	15–25	17–25			51–75	Report
21 Dec	20:00	Generali Unterhaching (Germany)	3–2	(Czech Republic) České Budějovice	25–21	20–25	23–25	25–22	15–8	108–101	Report
21 Dec	20:30	Cuneo (Italy)	3–0	(France) Stade Poitevin Poitiers	25–18	28–26	25–18			78–62	Report
11 Jan	20:00	Generali Unterhaching (Germany)	2–3	(France) Stade Poitevin Poitiers	16–25	26–24	22–25	25–14	11–15	100–103	Report
11 Jan	20:00	České Budějovice (Czech Republic)	0–3	(Italy) Cuneo	18–25	22–25	21–25			61–75	Report
18 Jan	20:00	Stade Poitevin Poitiers (France)	3–1	(Czech Republic) České Budějovice	25–18	25–23	23–25	25–21		98–87	Report
18 Jan	20:30	Cuneo (Italy)	0–3	(Germany) Generali Unterhaching	24–26	13–25	26–28			63–79	Report

=== Pool E ===
Pos	Team	Pld	W	L	Pts	SW	SL	SR	SPW	SPL	SPR	Qualification
1	(Russia) Lokomotiv Novosibirsk	6	5	1	14	16	6	2.667	532	461	1.154	Playoffs
2	(Italy) Lube Banca Marche Macerata	6	4	2	13	15	9	1.667	576	558	1.032	Playoffs
3	(Turkey) Fenerbahçe Grundig İstanbul	6	3	3	8	9	12	0.750	471	476	0.989	2011–12 CEV Cup
4	(Austria) Hypo Tirol Innsbruck	6	0	6	1	5	18	0.278	461	545	0.846	

Date	Time		Score		Set 1	Set 2	Set 3	Set 4	Set 5	Total	Report
20 Oct	20:25	Hypo Tirol Innsbruck (Austria)	1–3	(Turkey) Fenerbahçe	22–25	15–25	25–21	16–25		78–96	Report
20 Oct	20:30	Lube (Italy)	3–1	(Russia) Lokomotiv Novosibirsk	19–25	25–21	25–21	25–22		94–89	Report
26 Oct	19:00	Lokomotiv Novosibirsk (Russia)	3–0	(Austria) Hypo Tirol Innsbruck	25–19	25–19	25–20			75–58	Report
26 Oct	19:30	Fenerbahçe (Turkey)	3–2	(Italy) Lube	25–22	28–26	25–27	25–27	15–13	118–115	Report
13 Dec	19:30	Fenerbahçe (Turkey)	0–3	(Russia) Lokomotiv Novosibirsk	20–25	21–25	23–25			64–75	Report
15 Dec	20:25	Hypo Tirol Innsbruck (Austria)	1–3	(Italy) Lube	25–18	15–25	23–25	20–25		83–93	Report
20 Dec	20:30	Lube (Italy)	3–1	(Austria) Hypo Tirol Innsbruck	23–25	25–23	25–21	25–21		98–90	Report
21 Dec	19:00	Lokomotiv Novosibirsk (Russia)	3–0	(Turkey) Fenerbahçe	25–17	25–18	25–15			75–50	Report
11 Jan	20:30	Lube (Italy)	3–0	(Turkey) Fenerbahçe	25–21	25–21	28–26			78–68	Report
12 Jan	20:25	Hypo Tirol Innsbruck (Austria)	2–3	(Russia) Lokomotiv Novosibirsk	15–25	25–22	25–21	19–25	13–15	97–108	Report
18 Jan	19:00	Lokomotiv Novosibirsk (Russia)	3–1	(Italy) Lube	25–21	32–30	28–30	25–17		110–98	Report
18 Jan	19:30	Fenerbahçe (Turkey)	3–0	(Austria) Hypo Tirol Innsbruck	25–17	25–23	25–15			75–55	Report

=== Pool F ===
Pos	Team	Pld	W	L	Pts	SW	SL	SR	SPW	SPL	SPR	Qualification
1	(France) Tours VB	6	5	1	15	16	5	3.200	511	433	1.180	Playoffs
2	(Poland) PGE Skra Bełchatów (Note: Qualified as hosts) (H)	6	5	1	14	15	6	2.500	511	451	1.133	Final Four
3	(Slovenia) ACH Volley Ljubljana	6	2	4	6	9	14	0.643	499	527	0.947	2011–12 CEV Cup
4	(Montenegro) Budvanska Rivijera Budva	6	0	6	1	3	18	0.167	398	508	0.783	

(H) Host
Notes:

Date	Time		Score		Set 1	Set 2	Set 3	Set 4	Set 5	Total	Report
20 Oct	18:00	Budvanska Rivijera Budva (Montenegro)	0–3	(Poland) PGE Skra Bełchatów	21–25	17–25	22–25			60–75	Report
20 Oct	20:30	Tours VB (France)	3–0	(Slovenia) ACH Volley Ljubljana	25–17	25–19	25–21			75–57	Report
26 Oct	18:00	PGE Skra Bełchatów (Poland)	3–1	(France) Tours VB	25–22	25–21	19–25	25–22		94–90	Report
26 Oct	20:30	ACH Volley Ljubljana (Slovenia)	3–2	(Montenegro) Budvanska Rivijera Budva	20–25	23–25	25–18	25–10	15–12	108–90	Report
14 Dec	18:00	PGE Skra Bełchatów (Poland)	3–2	(Slovenia) ACH Volley Ljubljana	23–25	28–30	25–21	25–18	15–12	116–106	Report
15 Dec	18:00	Budvanska Rivijera Budva (Montenegro)	0–3	(France) Tours VB	19–25	14–25	20–25			53–75	Report
20 Dec	20:30	ACH Volley Ljubljana (Slovenia)	0–3	(Poland) PGE Skra Bełchatów	32–34	18–25	21–25			71–84	Report
21 Dec	20:30	Tours VB (France)	3–1	(Montenegro) Budvanska Rivijera Budva	25–22	25–18	22–25	25–18		97–83	Report
11 Jan	18:00	Budvanska Rivijera Budva (Montenegro)	0–3	(Slovenia) ACH Volley Ljubljana	26–28	17–25	21–25			64–78	Report
12 Jan	20:30	Tours VB (France)	3–0	(Poland) PGE Skra Bełchatów	25–22	25–21	26–24			76–67	Report
18 Jan	18:00	PGE Skra Bełchatów (Poland)	3–0	(Montenegro) Budvanska Rivijera Budva	25–16	25–15	25–17			75–48	Report
18 Jan	20:30	ACH Volley Ljubljana (Slovenia)	1–3	(France) Tours VB	13–25	25–23	21–25	20–25		79–98	Report

== Playoffs ==
=== Playoff 12 ===
Team 1	Agg.	Team 2	1st leg	2nd leg	Golden Set
ZAKSA Kędzierzyn-Koźle (Poland)	0–2	(Turkey) Arkas İzmir	1–3	0–3	
Generali Unterhaching (Germany)	0–2	(Russia) Lokomotiv Novosibirsk	1–3	0–3	
Lube Banca Marche Macerata (Italy)	1–1	(Italy) Bre Banca Lannutti Cuneo	0–3	3–2	16–14
Noliko Maaseik (Belgium)	0–2	(Italy) Trentino PlanetWin365	0–3	1–3	
VfB Friedrichshafen (Germany)	2–0	(France) Tours VB	3–0	3–2	
Stade Poitevin Poitiers (France)	0–2	(Russia) Zenit Kazan	2–3	0–3	

==== First leg ====
Date	Time		Score		Set 1	Set 2	Set 3	Set 4	Set 5	Total	Report
1 Feb	18:00	ZAKSA Kędzierzyn-Koźle (Poland)	1–3	(Turkey) Arkas İzmir	25–27	25–23	16–25	23–25		89–100	Report
1 Feb	20:30	Generali Unterhaching (Germany)	1–3	(Russia) Lokomotiv Novosibirsk	19–25	25–20	16–25	23–25		83–95	Report
1 Feb	20:30	Lube (Italy)	0–3	(Italy) Cuneo	20–25	24–26	22–25			66–76	Report
31 Jan	20:30	Noliko Maaseik (Belgium)	0–3	(Italy) Trentino PlanetWin365	18–25	22–25	18–25			58–75	Report
1 Feb	20:00	VfB Friedrichshafen (Germany)	3–0	(France) Tours VB	29–27	25–18	25–21			79–66	Report
1 Feb	20:30	Stade Poitevin Poitiers (France)	2–3	(Russia) Zenit Kazan	20–25	25–23	25–22	23–25	12–15	105–110	Report

==== Second leg ====
Date	Time		Score		Set 1	Set 2	Set 3	Set 4	Set 5	Total	Report
8 Feb	19:30	Arkas İzmir (Turkey)	3–0	(Poland) ZAKSA Kędzierzyn-Koźle	25–23	25–16	25–18			75–57	Report
8 Feb	19:00	Lokomotiv Novosibirsk (Russia)	3–0	(Germany) Generali Unterhaching	25–19	25–19	25–16			75–54	Report
8 Feb	20:30	Cuneo (Italy)	2–3	(Italy) Lube	22–25	25–20	25–21	24–26	14–16	110–108	Report
Golden set		Cuneo (Italy)	14–16	(Italy) Lube							
8 Feb	20:30	Trentino PlanetWin365 (Italy)	3–1	(Belgium) Noliko Maaseik	25–20	17–25	25–17	25–21		92–83	Report
8 Feb	20:30	Tours VB (France)	2–3	(Germany) VfB Friedrichshafen	20–25	25–20	25–15	25–27	14–16	109–103	Report
8 Feb	19:00	Zenit Kazan (Russia)	3–0	(France) Stade Poitevin Poitiers	25–12	25–23	25–19			75–54	Report

=== Playoff 6 ===
Team 1	Agg.	Team 2	1st leg	2nd leg	Golden Set
Lokomotiv Novosibirsk (Russia)	1–1	(Turkey) Arkas İzmir	3–0	2–3	11–15
Lube Banca Marche Macerata (Italy)	1–1	(Italy) Trentino PlanetWin365	3–2	0–3	9–15
Zenit Kazan (Russia)	2–0	(Germany) VfB Friedrichshafen	3–0	3–0	

==== First leg ====
Date	Time		Score		Set 1	Set 2	Set 3	Set 4	Set 5	Total	Report
21 Feb	19:00	Lokomotiv Novosibirsk (Russia)	3–0	(Turkey) Arkas İzmir	25–22	25–21	25–23			75–66	Report
22 Feb	20:30	Lube (Italy)	3–2	(Italy) Trentino PlanetWin365	16–25	19–25	25–18	25–22	15–9	100–99	Report
22 Feb	17:00	Zenit Kazan (Russia)	3–0	(Germany) VfB Friedrichshafen	25–17	25–21	25–18			75–56	Report

==== Second leg ====
Date	Time		Score		Set 1	Set 2	Set 3	Set 4	Set 5	Total	Report
1 Mar	19:00	Arkas İzmir (Turkey)	3–2	(Russia) Lokomotiv Novosibirsk	25–27	18–25	25–22	25–23	16–14	109–111	Report
Golden set		Arkas İzmir (Turkey)	15–11	(Russia) Lokomotiv Novosibirsk							
1 Mar	20:30	Trentino PlanetWin365 (Italy)	3–0	(Italy) Lube	25–18	25–22	25–21			75–61	Report
Golden set		Trentino PlanetWin365 (Italy)	15–9	(Italy) Lube							
28 Feb	20:00	VfB Friedrichshafen (Germany)	0–3	(Russia) Zenit Kazan	21–25	21–25	24–26			66–76	Report

== Final Four ==
- Organizer: (Poland) PGE Skra Bełchatów
- Place: Łódź
- All times are Central European Time (UTC+01:00).

Semifinals
17 March
(Poland) PGE Skra Bełchatów	3
(Turkey) Arkas İzmir	0
17 March
(Italy) Trentino PlanetWin365	1
(Russia) Zenit Kazan	3

Final
18 March
(Poland) PGE Skra Bełchatów	2
(Russia) Zenit Kazan	3
3rd place match
18 March
(Turkey) Arkas İzmir	0
(Italy) Trentino PlanetWin365	3

=== Semifinals ===
Date	Time		Score		Set 1	Set 2	Set 3	Set 4	Set 5	Total	Report
17 Mar	14:30	PGE Skra Bełchatów (Poland)	3–0	(Turkey) Arkas İzmir	25–23	25–21	28–26			78–70	Report
17 Mar	17:30	Trentino PlanetWin365 (Italy)	1–3	(Russia) Zenit Kazan	33–31	20–25	23–25	17–25		93–106	Report

=== 3rd place match ===
Date	Time		Score		Set 1	Set 2	Set 3	Set 4	Set 5	Total	Report
18 Mar	14:30	Arkas İzmir (Turkey)	0–3	(Italy) Trentino PlanetWin365	20–25	19–25	19–25			58–75	Report

=== Final ===
Date	Time		Score		Set 1	Set 2	Set 3	Set 4	Set 5	Total	Report
18 Mar	17:30	PGE Skra Bełchatów (Poland)	2–3	(Russia) Zenit Kazan	15–25	25–16	25–22	24–26	15–17	104–106	Report

== Final standings ==
Qualified for the 2012 FIVB Club World Championship

Rank	Team
1st place, gold medalist(s)	(Russia) Zenit Kazan
2nd place, silver medalist(s)	(Poland) PGE Skra Bełchatów
3rd place, bronze medalist(s)	(Italy) Trentino PlanetWin365
4	(Turkey) Arkas İzmir

2011–12 CEV Champions League winners

2nd title

== Awards ==
- Most valuable player
  (Poland) Mariusz Wlazły (PGE Skra Bełchatów)
- Best scorer
  (Russia) Maxim Mikhaylov (Zenit Kazan)
- Best spiker
  (Poland) Bartosz Kurek (PGE Skra Bełchatów)
- Best server
  (Russia) Maxim Mikhaylov (Zenit Kazan)
- Best blocker
  (Russia) Nikolay Apalikov (Zenit Kazan)
- Best receiver
  (Poland) Michał Winiarski (PGE Skra Bełchatów)
- Best libero
  (Russia) Aleksey Obmochaev (Zenit Kazan)
- Best setter
  (Italy) Valerio Vermiglio (Zenit Kazan)
