= 2019 FIVB Volleyball Men's Club World Championship squads =

This article shows the rosters of all participating teams at the 2019 FIVB Volleyball Men's Club World Championship in Betim, Brazil.

== Al-Rayyan SC ==
The following is the roster of the Qatari club Al-Rayyan SC in the 2019 FIVB Volleyball Men's Club World Championship.

- Head coach: (Brazil) Carlos Schwanke

No.	Name	Date of birth	Height	Weight	Spike	Block
1	(Montenegro) Marko Vukašinović	30 July 1993	1.95 m (6 ft 5 in)	86 kg (190 lb)	330 cm (130 in)	320 cm (130 in)
2	(Qatar) Saifeddine Aziz Elmajid	10 September 1984	1.97 m (6 ft 6 in)	91 kg (201 lb)	335 cm (132 in)	314 cm (124 in)
3	(Qatar) Mohamedamine Ouertani (L)	18 March 1993	0 m (0 in)	0 kg (0 lb)	0 cm (0 in)	0 cm (0 in)
4	(Qatar) Abdelrahman Ouda	12 April 2000	0 m (0 in)	0 kg (0 lb)	0 cm (0 in)	0 cm (0 in)
5	(Qatar) Miloš Stevanović	27 September 1988	1.92 m (6 ft 4 in)	85 kg (187 lb)	320 cm (130 in)	310 cm (120 in)
7	(Qatar) Belal Abunabot (C)	1 January 1991	2.00 m (6 ft 7 in)	95 kg (209 lb)	355 cm (140 in)	330 cm (130 in)
8	(Portugal) Marco Ferreira	4 October 1987	2.02 m (6 ft 8 in)	94 kg (207 lb)	359 cm (141 in)	337 cm (133 in)
9	(Qatar) Ali Bairami	13 February 1979	1.88 m (6 ft 2 in)	80 kg (180 lb)	320 cm (130 in)	300 cm (120 in)
10	(Brazil) Marcus Vinícius Costa	16 August 1994	0 m (0 in)	0 kg (0 lb)	0 cm (0 in)	0 cm (0 in)
16	(Qatar) Birama Faye	18 April 1995	2.10 m (6 ft 11 in)	95 kg (209 lb)	350 cm (140 in)	335 cm (132 in)
17	(Qatar) Ahmed Noaman	8 February 1994	2.02 m (6 ft 8 in)	85 kg (187 lb)	330 cm (130 in)	310 cm (120 in)

== Cucine Lube Civitanova ==
The following is the roster of the Italian club Cucine Lube Civitanova in the 2019 FIVB Volleyball Men's Club World Championship.

- Head coach: (Italy) Ferdinando De Giorgi

No.	Name	Date of birth	Height	Weight	Spike	Block
1	(Italy) Simone Anzani	24 February 1992	2.04 m (6 ft 8 in)	100 kg (220 lb)	350 cm (140 in)	330 cm (130 in)
2	(Italy) Jiří Kovář	10 April 1989	2.02 m (6 ft 8 in)	95 kg (209 lb)	353 cm (139 in)	330 cm (130 in)
3	(Belgium) Stijn D'Hulst	24 April 1991	1.87 m (6 ft 2 in)	75 kg (165 lb)	321 cm (126 in)	305 cm (120 in)
4	(Italy) Andrea Marchisio (L)	6 November 1990	1.82 m (6 ft 0 in)	86 kg (190 lb)	315 cm (124 in)	305 cm (120 in)
5	(Italy) Osmany Juantorena (C)	12 August 1985	2.00 m (6 ft 7 in)	85 kg (187 lb)	370 cm (150 in)	340 cm (130 in)
6	(Italy) Jacopo Massari	2 June 1988	1.85 m (6 ft 1 in)	79 kg (174 lb)	352 cm (139 in)	310 cm (120 in)
9	(Brazil) Yoandy Leal	31 August 1988	2.02 m (6 ft 8 in)	107 kg (236 lb)	361 cm (142 in)	348 cm (137 in)
10	(Iran) Amir Ghafour	6 June 1991	2.02 m (6 ft 8 in)	90 kg (200 lb)	354 cm (139 in)	334 cm (131 in)
11	(Luxembourg) Kamil Rychlicki	1 November 1996	2.04 m (6 ft 8 in)	98 kg (216 lb)	368 cm (145 in)	345 cm (136 in)
12	(Italy) Enrico Diamantini	4 April 1993	2.04 m (6 ft 8 in)	90 kg (200 lb)	340 cm (130 in)	260 cm (100 in)
13	(Cuba) Robertlandy Simón	11 June 1987	2.08 m (6 ft 10 in)	114 kg (251 lb)	358 cm (141 in)	326 cm (128 in)
14	(Brazil) Bruno Rezende	2 July 1986	1.90 m (6 ft 3 in)	76 kg (168 lb)	323 cm (127 in)	302 cm (119 in)
16	(Poland) Mateusz Bieniek	5 April 1994	2.10 m (6 ft 11 in)	106 kg (234 lb)	365 cm (144 in)	330 cm (130 in)
17	(Italy) Fabio Balaso (L)	20 October 1995	1.78 m (5 ft 10 in)	73 kg (161 lb)	305 cm (120 in)	280 cm (110 in)

== Sada Cruzeiro Vôlei ==
The following is the roster of the Brazilian club Sada Cruzeiro Vôlei in the 2019 FIVB Volleyball Men's Club World Championship.

- Head coach: (Argentina) Marcelo Méndez

No.	Name	Date of birth	Height	Weight	Spike	Block
1	(Brazil) Luan Weber	12 February 1991	2.00 m (6 ft 7 in)	85 kg (187 lb)	339 cm (133 in)	315 cm (124 in)
2	(Canada) John Gordon Perrin	17 August 1989	2.01 m (6 ft 7 in)	95 kg (209 lb)	353 cm (139 in)	329 cm (130 in)
3	(Brazil) Lucas de Deus (L)	26 January 1987	1.77 m (5 ft 10 in)	67 kg (148 lb)	301 cm (119 in)	282 cm (111 in)
4	(Brazil) Otávio Pinto	27 February 1991	2.00 m (6 ft 7 in)	85 kg (187 lb)	347 cm (137 in)	319 cm (126 in)
6	(Brazil) Rodrigo Leme	9 April 1980	1.83 m (6 ft 0 in)	73 kg (161 lb)	319 cm (126 in)	301 cm (119 in)
7	(Argentina) Facundo Conte	25 August 1989	1.97 m (6 ft 6 in)	88 kg (194 lb)	354 cm (139 in)	334 cm (131 in)
8	(Brazil) Evandro Guerra	27 December 1981	2.07 m (6 ft 9 in)	106 kg (234 lb)	359 cm (141 in)	332 cm (131 in)
10	(Brazil) Cledenílson Batista	9 June 1998	2.10 m (6 ft 11 in)	104 kg (229 lb)	379 cm (149 in)	359 cm (141 in)
12	(Brazil) Isac Santos	13 December 1990	2.08 m (6 ft 10 in)	99 kg (218 lb)	339 cm (133 in)	306 cm (120 in)
14	(Brazil) Fernando Kreling	13 January 1996	1.85 m (6 ft 1 in)	85 kg (187 lb)	319 cm (126 in)	301 cm (119 in)
15	(Brazil) Lucas Batista Silva (L)	28 September 1999	1.74 m (5 ft 9 in)	73 kg (161 lb)	300 cm (120 in)	290 cm (110 in)
17	(Brazil) Welinton Oppenkoski	28 March 2000	1.95 m (6 ft 5 in)	90 kg (200 lb)	337 cm (133 in)	325 cm (128 in)
18	(Brazil) Filipe Ferraz (C)	1 March 1980	1.94 m (6 ft 4 in)	90 kg (200 lb)	335 cm (132 in)	305 cm (120 in)
20	(Brazil) Hugo Hamacher Silva	13 April 1991	1.94 m (6 ft 4 in)	87 kg (192 lb)	340 cm (130 in)	312 cm (123 in)

== Zenit Kazan ==
The following is the roster of the Russian club Zenit Kazan in the 2019 FIVB Volleyball Men's Club World Championship.

- Head coach: (Russia) Vladimir Alekno

No.	Name	Date of birth	Height	Weight	Spike	Block
1	(Bulgaria) Tsvetan Sokolov	31 December 1989	2.06 m (6 ft 9 in)	100 kg (220 lb)	370 cm (150 in)	350 cm (140 in)
2	(Russia) Fedor Voronkov	10 December 1995	2.07 m (6 ft 9 in)	85 kg (187 lb)	350 cm (140 in)	340 cm (130 in)
3	(Russia) Andrey Surmachevskiy	22 June 1996	1.95 m (6 ft 5 in)	85 kg (187 lb)	335 cm (132 in)	325 cm (128 in)
4	(Russia) Artem Volvich	22 January 1990	2.08 m (6 ft 10 in)	96 kg (212 lb)	350 cm (140 in)	330 cm (130 in)
5	(Russia) Loran Alekno	18 September 1996	1.96 m (6 ft 5 in)	90 kg (200 lb)	330 cm (130 in)	320 cm (130 in)
7	(Russia) Vadym Likhosherstov	23 January 1989	2.15 m (7 ft 1 in)	104 kg (229 lb)	356 cm (140 in)	336 cm (132 in)
9	(France) Earvin N'Gapeth	12 February 1991	1.94 m (6 ft 4 in)	96 kg (212 lb)	358 cm (141 in)	327 cm (129 in)
10	(Russia) Aleksei Kononov	9 April 1997	2.05 m (6 ft 9 in)	93 kg (205 lb)	350 cm (140 in)	340 cm (130 in)
11	(Russia) Valentin Krotkov (L)	1 September 1991	1.95 m (6 ft 5 in)	84 kg (185 lb)	340 cm (130 in)	330 cm (130 in)
12	(Russia) Aleksandr Butko (C)	18 March 1986	1.98 m (6 ft 6 in)	97 kg (214 lb)	339 cm (133 in)	327 cm (129 in)
13	(Russia) Alexey Samoylenko	23 June 1985	2.07 m (6 ft 9 in)	98 kg (216 lb)	360 cm (140 in)	330 cm (130 in)
15	(Russia) Denis Zemchenok	11 August 1987	2.03 m (6 ft 8 in)	93 kg (205 lb)	350 cm (140 in)	333 cm (131 in)
17	(Russia) Valentin Golubev (L)	3 May 1992	1.90 m (6 ft 3 in)	70 kg (150 lb)	310 cm (120 in)	305 cm (120 in)
18	(Russia) Maxim Mikhaylov	19 March 1988	2.02 m (6 ft 8 in)	103 kg (227 lb)	345 cm (136 in)	330 cm (130 in)
