= Giampaolo Medei =

Italian volleyball coach

Personal information
- Born: 14 December 1973 (age 52); Treia, Italy

Coaching information
- Current team: Volley Lube
Previous teams coached
Years	Teams
2001–2006; 2006–2008; 2008–2009; 2009; 2009–2011; 2011–2012; 2012–2014; 2014–2016; 2016–2017; 2016–2017; 2017–2018; 2019–2021; 2022–2024; 2024–	Volley Lube (AC); Sparkling Milano (AC); Porto Potenza Picena; Andreoli Latina (AC); Andreoli Latina; Casa Modena (AC); Narbonne Volley; Beauvais Oise UC; Italy (AC); Tours VB; Volley Lube; Ziraat Bankası Ankara; Asseco Resovia; Volley Lube

Giampaolo Medei (born 14 December 1973) is an Italian professional volleyball coach. Since the 2024–25 season, he serves as head coach for Volley Lube.

== Honours ==
=== Club ===
- CEV Champions League
  - 2017–18 – with Cucine Lube Civitanova
- FIVB Club World Championship
  - Poland 2018 – with Cucine Lube Civitanova
- CEV Cup
  - 2016–17 – with Tours VB
  - 2023–24 – with Asseco Resovia
- CEV Challenge Cup
  - 2020–21 – with Ziraat Bankası Ankara
- Domestic
  - 2017–18 Italian Championship, with Cucine Lube Civitanova
  - 2020–21 Turkish Championship, with Ziraat Bankası Ankara
