= Stijn D'Hulst =

Belgian volleyball player (born 1991)

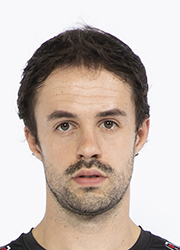

Personal information
- Born: 24 April 1991 (age 35); Kortrijk, Belgium
- Height: 1.87 m (6 ft 2 in)
- Weight: 75 kg (165 lb)
- Spike: 325 cm (128 in)
- Block: 307 cm (121 in)

Volleyball information
- Position: Setter
- Current club: Knack Roeselare
- Number: 4

Career
Years	Teams
2010–2017; 2017–2018; 2018–2020; 2020–	Knack Roeselare; SWD Powervolleys Düren; Cucine Lube Civitanova; Knack Roeselare

National team
2013–	Belgium
Honours
Men's volleyball
Representing Belgium
European League
Gold medal – first place	2013 Turkey

Stijn D'Hulst (born 24 April 1991) is a Belgian professional volleyball player who plays as a setter for Knack Roeselare and the Belgium national team.

== Honours ==
=== Club ===
- CEV Champions League
  - 2018–19 – with Cucine Lube Civitanova
- FIVB Club World Championship
  - Poland 2018 – with Cucine Lube Civitanova
  - Betim 2019 – with Cucine Lube Civitanova
- CEV Cup
  - 2022–23 – with Knack Roeselare
- Domestic
  - 2012–13, 2013–14, 2014–15, 2015–16, 2016–17, 2020–21, 2021–22, 2022–23, 2023–24, 2024–25 Belgian Championship (x10), with Knack Roeselare
  - 2010–11, 2012–13, 2015–16, 2016–17, 2020–21, 2022–23, 2023–24, 2024–25 Belgian Cup (x8), with Knack Roeselare
  - 2010–11, 2013–14, 2014–15, 2022–23, 2023–24, 2026–27 Belgian SuperCup (x6), with Knack Roeselare
  - 2018–19 Italian Championship, with Cucine Lube Civitanova
  - 2019–20 Italian Cup, with Cucine Lube Civitanova
