= Dragan Stanković =

Serbian volleyball player

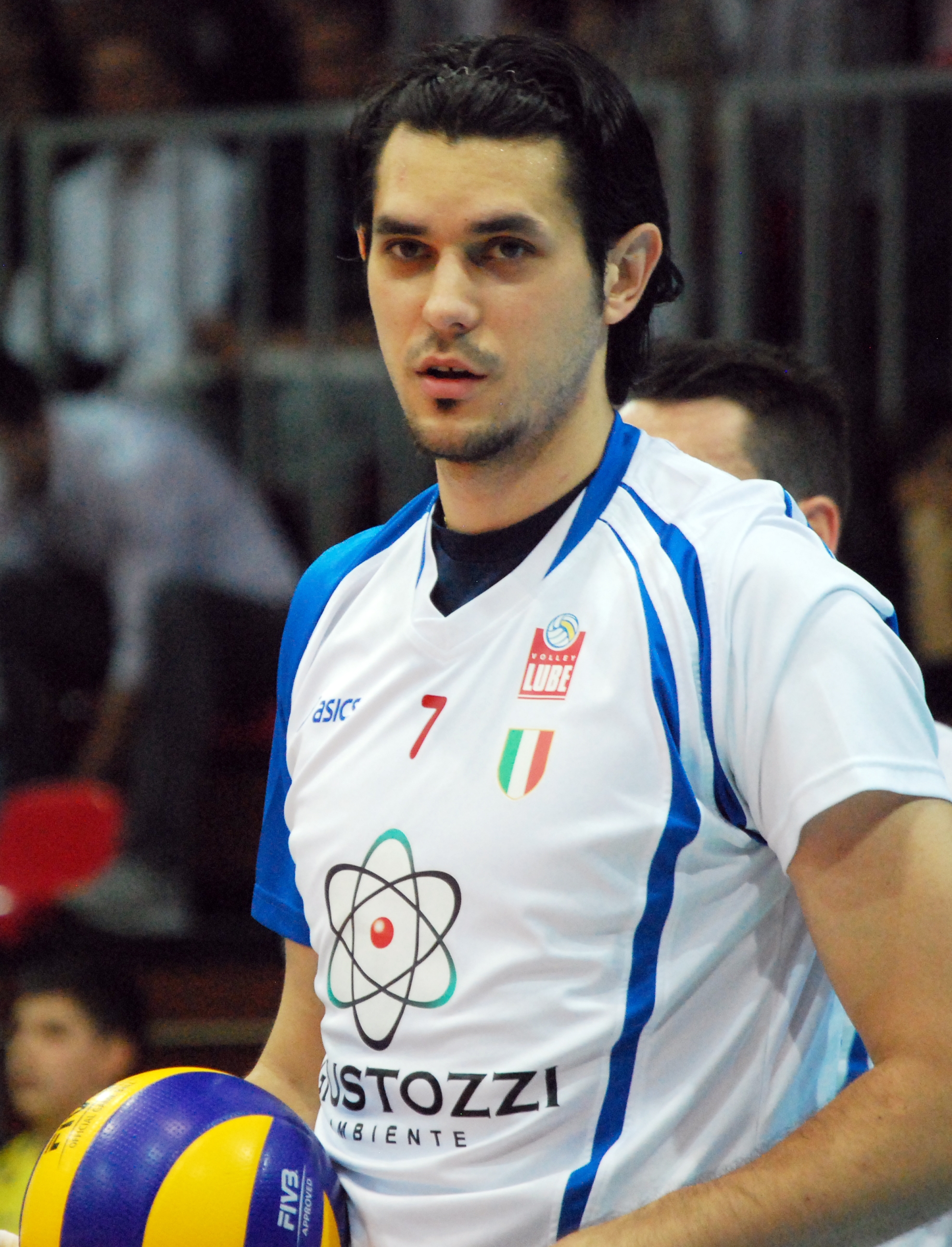

Personal information
- Born: 18 October 1985 (age 41); Zaječar, SR Serbia, SFR Yugoslavia
- Height: 2.05 m (6 ft 9 in)
- Weight: 94 kg (207 lb)
- Spike: 355 cm (140 in)
- Block: 330 cm (130 in)

Volleyball information
- Position: Middle blocker
- Current club: Modena Volley
- Number: 7

Career
Years	Teams
2001–2004; 2004–2008; 2008–2009; 2009–2019; 2019–2020; 2020–	OK Timok Zaječar; OK Crvena Zvezda; Budvanska Rivijera Budva; Cucine Lube Civitanova; You Energy Volley; Modena Volley

National team
2005–2006; 2006–	Serbia and Montenegro; Serbia
Honours
Men's volleyball
Representing Serbia and Montenegro
World League
Silver medal – second place	2005 Belgrade	Team
European Championship
Bronze medal – third place	2005 Italy/Serbia and Montenegro	Team
Representing Serbia
World Championship
Bronze medal – third place	2010 Italy	Team
World League
Gold medal – first place	2016 Kraków	Team
Silver medal – second place	2008 Rio de Janeiro	Team
Silver medal – second place	2009 Belgrade	Team
Silver medal – second place	2015 Rio de Janeiro	Team
Bronze medal – third place	2010 Córdoba	Team
European Championship
Gold medal – first place	2011 Austria/Czech Republic	Team
Bronze medal – third place	2007 Russia	Team
Bronze medal – third place	2013 Denmark/Poland	Team
Bronze medal – third place	2017 Poland	Team
- Last updated: 3 September 2017

Dragan Stanković (Serbian Cyrillic: Драган Станковић, born 18 October 1985) is a Serbian professional volleyball player, a member of Serbian national team and Italian club Modena Volley, a participant of the Olympic Games London 2012, bronze medalist of the World Championship, European Champion 2011, medalist of World League.

In 2020 Stanković changed the Federation of origin, playing with the Italian sporting nationality from the 2020-2021 season.

== Career ==
=== National team ===
He has been a long time member of Serbian national team, where he became squad captain after Bojan Janić decided to retire from national team. With national team he won a gold medal at the European Championships in 2011 which was held in Austria and Czech Republic. In his collection he also have a four silver medals and one bronze from the World Leagues. In 2010 he won a bronze medal in the World Championship in Italy, so as on three European Championships before. He was also a participant of Olympic Games in London in 2012. On 19 July 2015 Serbian national team with him in squad went to the final of World League, but they lost with United States 0–3 and achieved silver medal.

== Sporting achievements ==
=== Clubs ===
==== FIVB Club World Championship ====
- 2017 – with Cucine Lube Civitanova
- 2018 – with Cucine Lube Civitanova

==== CEV Champions League ====
- 2015/2016 - with Cucine Lube Civitanova
- 2016/2017 - with Cucine Lube Civitanova
- 2017/2018 - with Cucine Lube Civitanova
- 2018/2019 - with Cucine Lube Civitanova

==== CEV Challenge Cup ====
- 2010/2011 - with Lube Banca Macerata
- 2022–23 – with Valsa Group Modena

==== National championships ====
- 2007/2008 Serbian Championship, with OK Crvena Zvezda
- 2008/2009 Montenegrin Championship, with Budvanska Rivijera Budva
- 2011/2012 Italian Championship, with Lube Banca Macerata
- 2012/2013 Italian SuperCup 2012, with Lube Banca Macerata
- 2013/2014 Italian Championship, with Lube Banca Macerata
- 2014/2015 Italian SuperCup 2014, with Lube Banca Macerata
- 2016/2017 Italian Cup, with Cucine Lube Civitanova
- 2016/2017 Italian Championship, with Cucine Lube Civitanova
- 2018/2019 Italian Championship, with Cucine Lube Civitanova

=== National team ===
- 2005 FIVB World League
- 2005 CEV European Championship
- 2007 CEV European Championship
- 2008 FIVB World League
- 2009 FIVB World League
- 2010 FIVB World League
- 2010 FIVB World Championship
- 2011 CEV European Championship
- 2013 CEV European Championship
- 2015 FIVB World League
- 2016 FIVB World League
- 2017 CEV European Championship

Sporting positions
Preceded by Bojan Janić	Serbia captain 2013 – 2017	Succeeded by Nemanja Petrić
