= Fabio Balaso =

Italian volleyball player (born 1995)

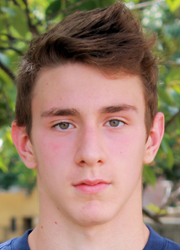

Personal information
- Nationality: Italian
- Born: 20 October 1995 (age 31); Camposampiero, Italy
- Height: 1.82 m (6 ft 0 in)
- Weight: 74 kg (163 lb)
- Spike: 310 cm (122 in)
- Block: 290 cm (114 in)

Volleyball information
- Position: Libero
- Current club: Cucine Lube Civitanova
- Number: 7

Career
Years	Teams
2011–2012; 2012–2018; 2018–	Trebaseleghe; Kioene Padova; Cucine Lube Civitanova

National team
Italy
Honours
Men's volleyball
Representing Italy
FIVB World Championship
Gold medal – first place	2022 Poland/Slovenia
Gold medal – first place	2025 Philippines
FIVB Nations League
Silver medal – second place	2025 Ningbo
CEV European Championship
Gold medal – first place	2021 Poland/Czechia/Estonia/Finland
Silver medal – second place	2023 Italy/Bulgaria/North Macedonia/Israel
Mediterranean Games
Gold medal – first place	2018 Tarragona	Team

Fabio Balaso (born 20 October 1995) is an Italian professional volleyball player who plays as a libero for Lega Pallavolo Serie A club Cucine Lube Civitanova, which he captains, and the Italy national team.

He participated at the 2017, 2019 and 2021 Men's European Volleyball Championship.

== Sporting achievements ==
=== Clubs ===
==== CEV Champions League ====
- 2018/2019 – with Cucine Lube Civitanova

==== FIVB Club World Championship ====
- Poland 2018 – with Cucine Lube Civitanova
- Betim 2019 – with Cucine Lube Civitanova
- Betim 2021 – with Cucine Lube Civitanova

=== National championship ===
- 2018/2019 Italian Cup, with Cucine Lube Civitanova
- 2018/2019 Italian Championship, with Cucine Lube Civitanova
- 2019/2020 Italian Cup, with Cucine Lube Civitanova
- 2020/2021 Italian Supercup, with Cucine Lube Civitanova
- 2020/2021 Italian Cup, with Cucine Lube Civitanova
- 2020/2021 Italian Championship, with Cucine Lube Civitanova
- 2022/2023 Italian Championship, with Cucine Lube Civitanova

== Individual awards ==
- 2019: FIVB Club World Championship – Best Libero
- 2021: Italian Serie A1 – Best Libero
- 2021: CEV European Championship – Best Libero
- 2021: FIVB Club World Championship – Best Libero
- 2022: FIVB World Championship – Best Libero

2025: world volleyvol championship: Best Libero

Awards
Preceded by (France) Jenia Grebennikov	Best Libero of FIVB Club World Championship; 2019; 2021	Succeeded by Incumbent
Preceded by (Slovenia) Jani Kovačič	Best Libero of CEV European Championship; 2021	Succeeded by Incumbent
Preceded by (Poland) Paweł Zatorski	Best Libero of FIVB World Championship; 2022	Succeeded by Incumbent
