= Yoandy Leal =

Cuban-Brazilian volleyball player (born 1988)

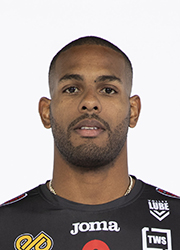
- Leal in 2019

Personal information
- Full name: Yoandy Leal Hidalgo
- Nationality: Cuban; Brazilian (since 2015)
- Born: 31 August 1988 (age 38); Havana, Cuba
- Height: 2.01 m (6 ft 7 in)
- Weight: 105 kg (231 lb)
- Spike: 371 cm (146 in)
- Block: 348 cm (137 in)

Volleyball information
- Position: Outside hitter
- Current club: Sada Cruzeiro
- Number: 17

Career
| Years | Teams |
|---|---|
| 2006–2011; 2012–2017; 2018–2021; 2021–2022; 2022–2024; 2024; 2025–2026; 2026– | La Habana; Sada Cruzeiro; Volley Lube; Modena Volley; Gas Sales Piacenza; Lokomotiv Novosibirsk; Halkbank; Sada Cruzeiro |

National team
| 2007–2010; 2019–2024 | Cuba; Brazil |
Honours
Men's volleyball
Representing Brazil
FIVB World Championship
| Bronze medal – third place | 2022 Poland/Slovenia | Team |
FIVB World Cup
| Gold medal – first place | 2019 Japan |
FIVB Nations League
| Gold medal – first place | 2021 Rimini |
CSV South American Championship
| Gold medal – first place | 2019 Chile |
| Silver medal – second place | 2023 Recife |
Representing Cuba
FIVB World Championship
| Silver medal – second place | 2010 Italy |
FIVB World Grand Champions Cup
| Silver medal – second place | 2009 Japan |
NORCECA Championship
| Gold medal – first place | 2009 Puerto Rico |

Yoandy Leal Hidalgo (born 31 August 1988) is a volleyball player who plays as a wing-spiker for club Sada Cruzeiro. Born in Cuba, he is a former member of the Cuban national volleyball team (2007–2010), and currently represents Brazil (since 2019) after gaining Brazilian citizenship in June 2015.

Leal played four years with the Cuban national team, debuting at the 2007 FIVB Volleyball Men's U21 World Championship. In the 2008 World Olympic Qualification Tournament in Düsseldorf that would give a spot at the 2008 Summer Olympics. Cuba did not qualify, finishing second to hosts Germany, but Leal was chosen Best Spiker and Server of the championship. His last tournament with Cuba was the 2010 FIVB Volleyball Men's World Championship, where Leal won the silver medal.

Still pursuing his dream of playing in the Olympics, Leal left Cuba in 2010, establishing himself as a volleyball star in Belo Horizonte, Brazil. After two years of not playing, Leal signed with local team Sada Cruzeiro. Soon he was a vital part of the team, winning two editions each of the Brazilian Superligas, South American Championships, and FIVB Volleyball Men's Club World Championship. Leal started his naturalization process in 2013, and in 2015 he was given Brazilian nationality. Afterward, he contacted the International Volleyball Federation to see how soon he could play for Brazil's national team, as team coach Bernardo Rezende already expressed interest in having Leal in the squad for the 2016 Summer Olympics. He joined the Brazilian national team in 2019.

== Sporting achievements ==
=== Clubs ===
- CEV Champions League
  - 2018/2019 – with Cucine Lube Civitanova
- FIVB Club World Championship
  - Betim 2013 – with Sada Cruzeiro
  - Betim 2015 – with Sada Cruzeiro
  - Betim 2016 – with Sada Cruzeiro
  - Poland 2018 – with Cucine Lube Civitanova
  - Betim 2019 – with Cucine Lube Civitanova
- CSV South American Club Championship
  - Belo Horizonte 2014 – with Sada Cruzeiro
  - Taubate 2016 – with Sada Cruzeiro
  - Montes Claros 2017 – with Sada Cruzeiro
- National championships
  - 2013/2014 Brazilian Championship, with Sada Cruzeiro
  - 2013/2014 Brazilian Cup, with Sada Cruzeiro
  - 2014/2015 Brazilian Championship, with Sada Cruzeiro
  - 2015/2016 Brazilian Championship, with Sada Cruzeiro
  - 2015/2016 Brazilian Cup, with Sada Cruzeiro
  - 2016/2017 Brazilian Championship, with Sada Cruzeiro
  - 2018/2019 Italian Championship, with Cucine Lube Civitanova
  - 2022/2023 Italian Cup, with Gas Sales Bluenergy Piacenza

=== Individual awards ===
- 2010: FIVB World League – Best server
- 2013: FIVB Club World Championship – Best spiker
- 2014: CSV South American Club Championship – Best spiker
- 2015: CSV South American Club Championship – Best spiker
- 2015: FIVB Club World Championship – Most valuable player
- 2016: CSV South American Club Championship – Most valuable player
- 2016: FIVB Club World Championship – Best spiker
- 2017: CSV South American Club Championship – Best spiker
- 2017: CSV South American Club Championship – Most valuable player
- 2017: FIVB Club World Championship – Best outside spiker
- 2019: CSV South American Championship – Best outside spiker
- 2021: FIVB Nations League – Best outside spiker
- 2022: FIVB World Championship – Best outside spiker
- 2023: Italian Cup – Most valuable player

Awards
| Preceded by (Russia) Dmitry Muserskiy | Most Valuable Player of FIVB Club World Championship; 2015 | Succeeded by (Brazil) William Arjona |
| Preceded by (Cuba) Wilfredo León (Bulgaria) Todor Aleksiev | Best Outside Spiker of FIVB Club World Championship; 2016 ex aequo (Cuba) Wilfredo León | Succeeded by (Cuba) Wilfredo León (Brazil) Yoandy Leal |
| Preceded by (Poland) Bartosz Bednorz (Russia) Dmitry Volkov (Russia) Egor Kliuka | Best Outside Spiker of FIVB Nations League; Rimini 2021 (with (Poland) Michał Kubiak) | Succeeded by (France) Trévor Clévenot (France) Earvin N'Gapeth |
