= Tsvetan Sokolov =

Bulgarian volleyball player (born 1989)

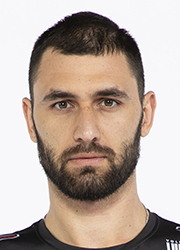
- Sokolov in 2019

Personal information
- Full name: Tsvetan Nikolaev Sokolov
- Born: 31 December 1989 (age 36) Dupnitsa, Bulgaria
- Height: 2.06 m (6 ft 9 in)
- Weight: 113 kg (249 lb)
- Spike: 357 cm (141 in)
- Block: 338 cm (133 in)

Volleyball information
- Position: Opposite
- Current club: Halkbank Ankara
- Number: 19

Career
- Years: Team
- 2003–2009 2009–2012 2012–2013 2013–2014 2014–2016 2016–2019 2019–2020 2020–2025 2025-: Marek Union-Ivkoni; Itas Diatec Trentino; Bre Banca Lannutti Cuneo; Diatec Trentino; Halkbank Ankara; Cucine Lube Civitanova; Zenit Kazan; Dynamo Moscow; Halkbank Ankara

National team
- Years: Team
- 2007–2023: Bulgaria
Honours
Men's volleyball
Representing Bulgaria
CEV European Championship
Bronze medal – third place	2009 Turkey

Tsvetan Nikolaev Sokolov (Bulgarian: Цветан Николаев Соколов; born 31 December 1989) is a Bulgarian professional volleyball player who plays as an opposite spiker for Halkbank Ankara. Sokolov is a former member of the Bulgaria national team, a participant in the Olympic Games London 2012, and a multiple winner of the CEV Champions League and Club World Championship.

== Personal life ==
Sokolov was born in Dupnitsa, Bulgaria. In 2014, he married Deliyana Hristova. On 27 October 2014, his wife gave birth to their children – twins Nikola and Viktor.

== Honours ==
=== Club ===
- CEV Champions League
  - 2009–10 – with Itas Diatec Trentino
  - 2010–11 – with Itas Diatec Trentino
  - 2018–19 – with Cucine Lube Civitanova
- FIVB Club World Championship
  - Doha 2009 – with Itas Diatec Trentino
  - Doha 2010 – with Itas Diatec Trentino
  - Doha 2011 – with Itas Diatec Trentino
- CEV Cup
  - 2020–21 – with Dynamo Moscow
- Domestic
  - 2009–10 Italian Cup, with Itas Diatec Trentino
  - 2010–11 Italian Championship, with Itas Diatec Trentino
  - 2011–12 Italian SuperCup, with Itas Diatec Trentino
  - 2011–12 Italian Cup, with Itas Diatec Trentino
  - 2013–14 Italian SuperCup, with Diatec Trentino
  - 2014–15 Turkish SuperCup, with Halkbank Ankara
  - 2014–15 Turkish Cup, with Halkbank Ankara
  - 2015–16 Turkish SuperCup, with Halkbank Ankara
  - 2015–16 Turkish Championship, with Halkbank Ankara
  - 2016–17 Italian Cup, with Cucine Lube Civitanova
  - 2016–17 Italian Championship, with Cucine Lube Civitanova
  - 2018–19 Italian Championship, with Cucine Lube Civitanova
  - 2019–20 Russian Cup, with Zenit Kazan
  - 2020–21 Russian Cup, with Dynamo Moscow
  - 2020–21 Russian Championship, with Dynamo Moscow
  - 2020–21 Russian SuperCup, with Dynamo Moscow
  - 2021–22 Russian Championship, with Dynamo Moscow
  - 2021–22 Russian SuperCup, with Dynamo Moscow

=== Individual awards ===
- 2013: FIVB World League – Best opposite spiker
- 2013: FIVB Club World Championship – Best opposite spiker
- 2017: FIVB Club World Championship – Best opposite spiker
- 2018: CEV Champions League – Best opposite spiker
- 2018: FIVB Club World Championship – Best opposite spiker

Awards
Preceded by (Poland) Zbigniew Bartman	Best Opposite Spiker of FIVB World League; 2013	Succeeded by (Brazil) Wallace de Souza
Preceded by (Brazil) Evandro Guerra	Best Opposite Spiker of FIVB Club World Championship; 2017; 2018	Succeeded by (Brazil) Evandro Guerra
Preceded by (Serbia) Aleksandar Atanasijević	Best Opposite Spiker of CEV Champions League; 2017/2018	Succeeded by Not awarded
