= Ferdinando De Giorgi =

Italian volleyball player and coach

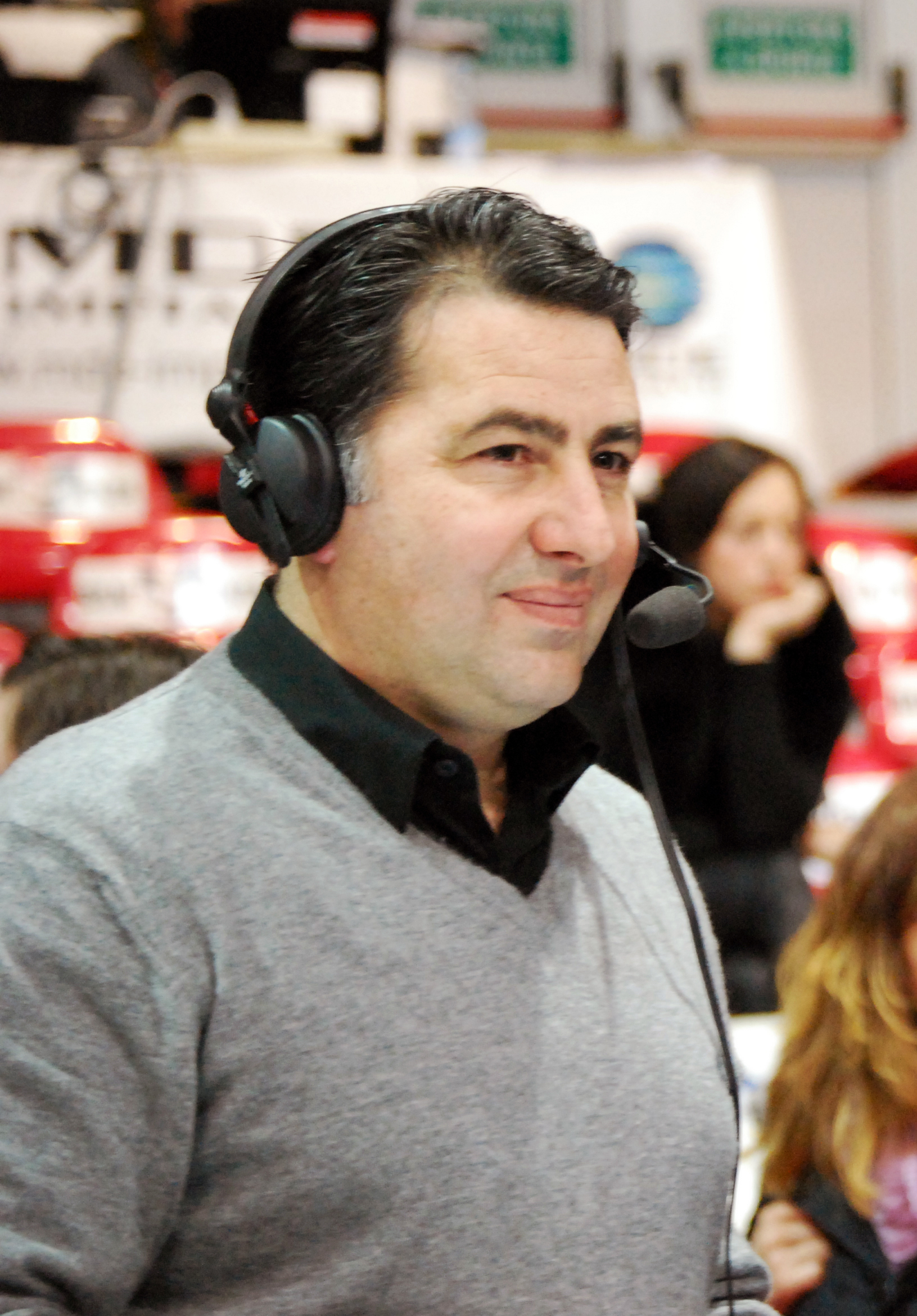
- De Giorgi in 2011

Personal information
- Nickname: Fefè
- Born: 10 October 1961 (age 65); Squinzano, Italy
- Height: 1.78 m (5 ft 10 in)

Coaching information
- Current team: Italy
Previous teams coached
Years	Teams
2000–2003; 2003–2005; 2005–2010; 2011–2012; 2012–2014; 2014–2015; 2015–2017; 2017; 2018; 2018–2021; 2021–	Piemonte Volley; Umbria Volley; Volley Lube; Umbria Volley; Fakel Novy Urengoy; Volley Callipo; ZAKSA Kędzierzyn-Koźle; Poland; Jastrzębski Węgiel; Volley Lube; Italy

Volleyball information
- Position: Setter
- Number: 4 (national team)

Career
Years	Teams
1977–1981; 1981–1986; 1986–1987; 1987–1990; 1990–1992; 1992–1994; 1994–1997; 1997–2000; 2000–2002	Vis Squinzano; Pallavolo Falchi Ugento; Modena Volley; Gabeca Pallavolo; Pallavolo Padova; Pallavolo Falconara; Piemonte Volley; Gabeca Pallavolo; Piemonte Volley

National team
1987–2002	Italy (330)
Honours
Men's volleyball
Representing Italy
FIVB World Championship
Gold medal – first place	1990 Brazil
Gold medal – first place	1994 Greece
Gold medal – first place	1998 Japan
FIVB World Cup
Silver medal – second place	1989 Japan
FIVB World League
Gold medal – first place	1990 Osaka
Gold medal – first place	1991 Milan
Gold medal – first place	1992 Genoa
Gold medal – first place	1994 Milan
Gold medal – first place	1995 Rio de Janeiro
CEV European Championship
Gold medal – first place	1989 Sweden
Silver medal – second place	1991 Germany
Head coach Italy
FIVB World Championship
Gold medal – first place	2022 Poland/Slovenia
Gold medal – first place	2025 Philippines
FIVB Nations League
Silver medal – second place	2025 Ningbo
CEV European Championship
Gold medal – first place	2021 Poland/Czechia/Estonia/Finland
Silver medal – second place	2023 Italy/Bulgaria/North Macedonia/Israel

Ferdinando De Giorgi (born 10 October 1961) is an Italian professional volleyball coach and former player.

He competed in the Seoul 1988 Olympic Games and is a three-time World Champion (1990, 1994, 1998), as well as the 1989 European Champion.

He currently serves as head coach of the Italian national team.

De Giorgi has been part of every Italian men’s national volleyball team that won the World Championship: three times as a player and twice as a coach.

== Career as coach ==
In March 2015, he signed a contract with ZAKSA Kędzierzyn-Koźle. On 20 December 2016, he was appointed new head coach of the Poland national team. He replaced the previous head coach, Stéphane Antiga.

== Honours ==
=== As a player ===
- CEV Cup
  - 1996–97 – with Alpitur Traco Cuneo
- CEV Challenge Cup
  - 1995–96 – with Alpitur Cuneo
  - 2001–02 – with Noicom Cuneo
- Domestic
  - 1986–87 Italian Championship, with Panini Modena
  - 1995–96 Italian Cup, with Alpitur Traco Cuneo
  - 1996–97 Italian SuperCup, with Alpitur Traco Cuneo
  - 2001–02 Italian Cup, with Noicom Brebanca Cuneo

=== As a coach ===
- CEV Champions League
  - 2018–19 – with Cucine Lube Civitanova
- FIVB Club World Championship
  - Betim 2019 – with Cucine Lube Civitanova
- CEV Challenge Cup
  - 2001–02 – with Noicom Cuneo
  - 2005–06 – with Lube Macerata
- Domestic
  - 2001–02 Italian Cup, with Noicom Brebanca Cuneo
  - 2002–03 Italian SuperCup, with Noicom Brebanca Cuneo
  - 2005–06 Italian Championship, with Lube Banca Marche Macerata
  - 2006–07 Italian SuperCup, with Lube Banca Marche Macerata
  - 2007–08 Italian Cup, with Lube Banca Marche Macerata
  - 2008–09 Italian SuperCup, with Lube Banca Marche Macerata
  - 2008–09 Italian Cup, with Lube Banca Marche Macerata
  - 2015–16 Polish Championship, with ZAKSA Kędzierzyn-Koźle
  - 2016–17 Polish Cup, with ZAKSA Kędzierzyn-Koźle
  - 2016–17 Polish Championship, with ZAKSA Kędzierzyn-Koźle
  - 2018–19 Italian Championship, with Cucine Lube Civitanova
  - 2019–20 Italian Cup, with Cucine Lube Civitanova
  - 2020–21 Italian Cup, with Cucine Lube Civitanova

=== Individual awards ===
- 2022: Coach of the Year (according to La Gazzetta dello Sport)

Sporting positions
Preceded by (France) Stéphane Antiga	Head coach of Poland; 2017	Succeeded by (Belgium) Vital Heynen
Preceded by (Italy) Gianlorenzo Blengini	Head coach of Italy; 2021-	Succeeded by -
