= Jiří Kovář =

Italian volleyball player (born 1989)

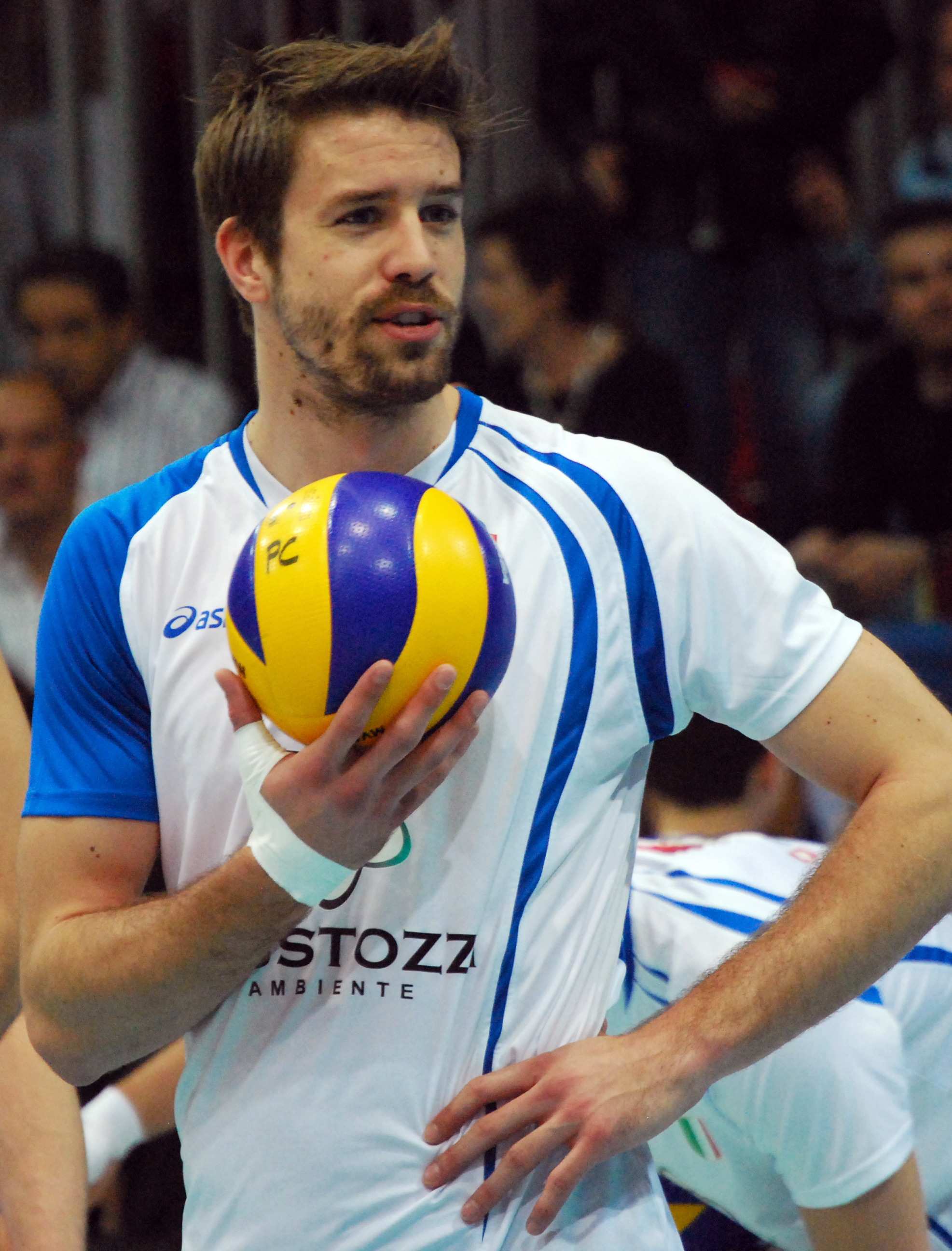

Personal information
- Full name: Jiří Kovář
- Nationality: Italian; Czech
- Born: 10 April 1989 (age 37) Gottwaldov, Czechoslovakia
- Height: 2.02 m (6 ft 8 in)
- Weight: 95 kg (209 lb)
- Spike: 353 cm (139 in)
- Block: 330 cm (130 in)

Volleyball information
- Position: Outside Hitter
- Current team: Free agent

Career
- Years: Team
- 2006–2008 2008–2009 2009–2010 2010–2011 2011–2022 2022–2024 2024–2025: (Italy) Sisley Treviso (Italy) Pallavolo Loreto (Italy) Marmi Lanza Verona (Italy) Sisley Treviso (Italy) Cucine Lube Civitanova (Greece) Panathinaikos (Turkey) Galatasaray

National team
- Years: Team
- 2011–2021: Italy
Honours
Representing Italy
Men's volleyball
European Championship
Silver medal – second place	2013 Denmark/Poland
World League
Bronze medal – third place	2014 Florence
- Updated on 30 April 2017

Jiří Kovář (born 10 April 1989) is a Czech-born Italian volleyball player, a member of Italy men's national volleyball team and Turkish club Galatasaray. He was silver medalist of the European Championship 2013, bronze medalist of the World League 2014, and triple Italian Champion (2012, 2014 and 2017).

== Career ==
=== Clubs ===
In 2014, he won a title of Italian Champion after winning matches against Sir Safety Perugia. On 15 October 2014 Lube Banca Macerata, including Kovář, won their first trophy of the 2014/2015 season. The Macerata club beat Copra Elior Piacenza (3–2) and won Italian SuperCup2014.

==== Galatasaray ====
On 12 July 2024, he signed a 1-year contract with Galatasaray. Galatasaray said goodbye to the player on 12 May 2025.

=== National team ===
On 20 July 2014 Italy, including Kovář, claimed the bronze medal of the World League 2014, beating Iran 3-0. In 2014 played at World Championship 2014 held in Poland. Italy after promotion from Pool C, took 7th place in Pool E and they were eliminated from further fighting for medals. Italy took 13th place.

== Sporting achievements ==
=== Clubs ===
==== FIVB Club World Championship ====
- Poland 2017 – with Cucine Lube Civitanova
- Brazil 2019 – with Cucine Lube Civitanova
- Brazil 2021 – with Cucine Lube Civitanova

==== CEV Champions League ====
- 2018/2019 - with Cucine Lube Civitanova

==== CEV Cup ====
- 2010/2011 - with Sisley Treviso

==== National championships ====
- 2011/2012 Italian Championship, with Lube Banca Macerata
- 2012/2013 Italian SuperCup2012, with Lube Banca Macerata
- 2013/2014 Italian Championship, with Lube Banca Macerata
- 2014/2015 Italian SuperCup2014, with Lube Banca Macerata
- 2016/2017 Italian Cup, with Cucine Lube Civitanova
- 2016/2017 Italian Championship, with Cucine Lube Civitanova

=== National team ===
- 2013 CEV European Championship
- 2014 FIVB World League

=== Individually ===
- 2011 CEV Cup – Best Server
- 2012 Italian Championship – Most Valuable Player
- 2017 Italian Championship – Most Valuable Player
- 2017 Italian Cup – Best Receiver
- 2023 Hellenic League Cup – Most Valuable Player
- 2023 Hellenic Championship – Best Outside Spiker
