= Aaron Russell =

American volleyball player (born 1993)

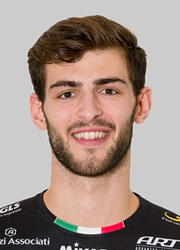
- Russell in 2017

Personal information
- Full name: Aaron Joseph Russell
- Nickname: Ronnie; Ron
- Born: June 4, 1993 (age 33); Arbutus, Maryland, U.S.
- Hometown: Ellicott City, Maryland, U.S.
- Height: 6 ft 9 in (2.05 m)
- Weight: 216 lb (98 kg)
- Spike: 140 in (360 cm)
- Block: 130 in (340 cm)
- Education: Pennsylvania State University

Volleyball information
- Position: Outside hitter
- Current club: Warta Zawiercie
- Number: 3

Career
Years	Teams
2012–2015; 2015–2018; 2018–2020; 2020–2022; 2022–2024; 2024–	Penn State Nittany Lions; Sir Safety Perugia; Itas Trentino; Gas Sales Piacenza; JT Thunders; Warta Zawiercie

National team
2014–	United States
Medal record
Men's volleyball
Representing United States
Olympic Games
Bronze medal – third place	2016 Rio de Janeiro	Team
Bronze medal – third place	2024 Paris	Team
FIVB World Championship
Bronze medal – third place	2018 Italy/Bulgaria
FIVB World Cup
Gold medal – first place	2015 Japan
Gold medal – first place	2023 Japan
Bronze medal – third place	2019 Japan
FIVB Nations League
Silver medal – second place	2019 Chicago
Silver medal – second place	2022 Bologna
Silver medal – second place	2023 Gdańsk
Bronze medal – third place	2018 Lille
FIVB World League
Bronze medal – third place	2015 Rio de Janeiro
NORCECA Championship
Gold medal – first place	2017 Colorado Springs
Gold medal – first place	2023 Charleston

Aaron Joseph Russell (born June 4, 1993) is an American professional volleyball player who plays as an outside hitter for Aluron CMC Warta Zawiercie and the U.S. national team. He was a bronze medalist at the Olympic Games Rio 2016, Paris 2024 and the 2018 World Championship.

== Personal life ==
Russell grew up in Ellicott City, Maryland, U.S. His parents are Stewart and Marian Russell. Russell was born the second of five boys. The other brothers are Peter (1992), Samuel (1995), Tim (1999), and Paul (2002). Peter also plays volleyball professionally. Russell was a top soccer player for Centennial High School in Maryland. The school did not have a boys' volleyball team so he helped the girls' team train while playing club volleyball at MVP (Maryland Volleyball Program). In 2015, he graduated from Pennsylvania State University. On July 30, 2017, he married former Penn State women's volleyball player Kendall Pierce, his college sweetheart. They have one daughter.

== Career ==
In 2015, he completed his volleyball career at Penn State, where he was named an AVCA First Team All–American in 2014 and 2015. All four years he helped Penn State reach the NCAA men's championship semifinals. Russell was a member of the Boys’ Youth Team in 2010 and 2011 and a member of the Men's Junior National Team in 2013. He made his debut with the senior national team in 2014.

In 2015, he joined his first professional team, Sir Safety Perugia of Italy.

In 2016, Russell took part in his first Olympic Games in Rio de Janeiro as a member of the U.S Olympic team and won a bronze medal when the U.S. beat Russia in five sets. Russell was named one of the Best Outside Spikers of the tournament.

In June 2018, after 3 years spent playing for Perugia, Russell signed for another Italian team, Diatec Trentino. At the 2018 Club World Championship held in Poland, he was named the Most Valuable Player for his contribution to Diatec Trentino's 5th gold medal, the most by any club team in the history of the tournament.

In 2024, Russell took part in his second Olympic Games in Paris as a member of the U.S Olympic team and won a bronze medal when the U.S beat Italy in three sets.

== Honors ==
=== Club ===
- CEV Champions League
  - 2016–17 – with Sir Safety Perugia
  - 2024–25 – with Aluron CMC Warta Zawiercie
  - 2025–26 – with Aluron CMC Warta Zawiercie
- FIVB Club World Championship
  - Poland 2018 – with Trentino Volley
- CEV Cup
  - 2018–19 – with Diatec Trentino
- Domestic
  - 2017–18 Italian SuperCup, with Sir Safety Perugia
  - 2017–18 Italian Cup, with Sir Safety Perugia
  - 2017–18 Italian Championship, with Sir Safety Perugia
  - 2024–25 Polish SuperCup, with Aluron CMC Warta Zawiercie
  - 2025–26 Polish Championship, with Aluron CMC Warta Zawiercie

=== Individual awards ===
- 2016: Olympic Games – Best outside spiker
- 2017: NORCECA Championship – Best outside spiker
- 2017: Italian SuperCup – Most valuable player
- 2018: FIVB Club World Championship – Most valuable player
- 2023: V.League Division 1 – Best server
- 2024: Polish SuperCup – Most valuable player

=== College ===
- AVCA First Team All–American – 2014, 2015
- NCAA Championship All–Tournament Team – 2015
- Uvaldo Acosta Memorial EIVA Player of the Year – 2013, 2014, 2015
- EIVA First Team All–Conference – 2012, 2013, 2014, 2015
- EIVA Championship Most Outstanding Player – 2013, 2015
- EIVA Championship All–Tournament Team – 2012, 2013, 2014, 2015

== See also ==
- List of Pennsylvania State University Olympians

Awards
Preceded by First award	Best Outside Spiker of Olympic Games; 2016 ex aequo (Brazil) Ricardo Lucarelli	Succeeded by (France) Earvin N'Gapeth (Russia) Egor Kliuka
Preceded by (Italy) Osmany Juantorena	Most Valuable Player of FIVB Club World Championship; 2018	Succeeded by (Brazil) Bruno Rezende
