= Jacopo Massari =

Italian volleyball player (born 1988)

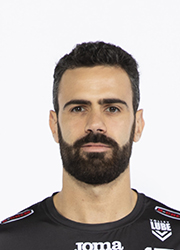
- Massari in 2019

Personal information
- Full name: Jacopo Massari
- Nationality: Italian
- Born: June 2, 1988 (age 38); Parma, Italy
- Height: 1.85 m (6 ft 1 in)
- Weight: 82 kg (181 lb)
- Spike: 340 cm (130 in)
- Block: 318 cm (125 in)

Volleyball information
- Position: Outside hitter
- Current club: Cucine Lube Civitanova
- Number: 6 (club), 22 (national team)

Career
Years	Teams
2002–2007; 2007–2012; 2012–2014; 2014–2015; 2015–2016; 2016–2017; 2017–2018; 2018–	Pallavolo Parma; Volley Piacenza; Pallavolo Città di Castello; Volley Piacenza; Paris Volley; Azimut Modena; Callipo Sport; Cucine Lube Civitanova

National team
2015–	Italy
Honours
Representing Italy
Men's volleyball
World Cup
Silver medal – second place	2015 Japan
European Championship
Bronze medal – third place	2015 Bulgaria/Italy
- Last updated: 11 February 2017

Jacopo Massari (born 2 June 1988) is an Italian volleyball player, a member of the Italy men's national volleyball team and Italian club Cucine Lube Civitanova, silver medalist of the 2015 World Cup, bronze medalist of the 2015 European Championship. He wears Solhanspor jersey in Turkish Men's Volleyball League.

== Sporting achievements ==
=== Clubs ===
- FIVB Club World Championship
  - Poland 2019 – with Cucine Lube Civitanova
  - Brazil 2019 – with Cucine Lube Civitanova
