= Alessandro Paparoni =

Italian volleyball player (born 1981)

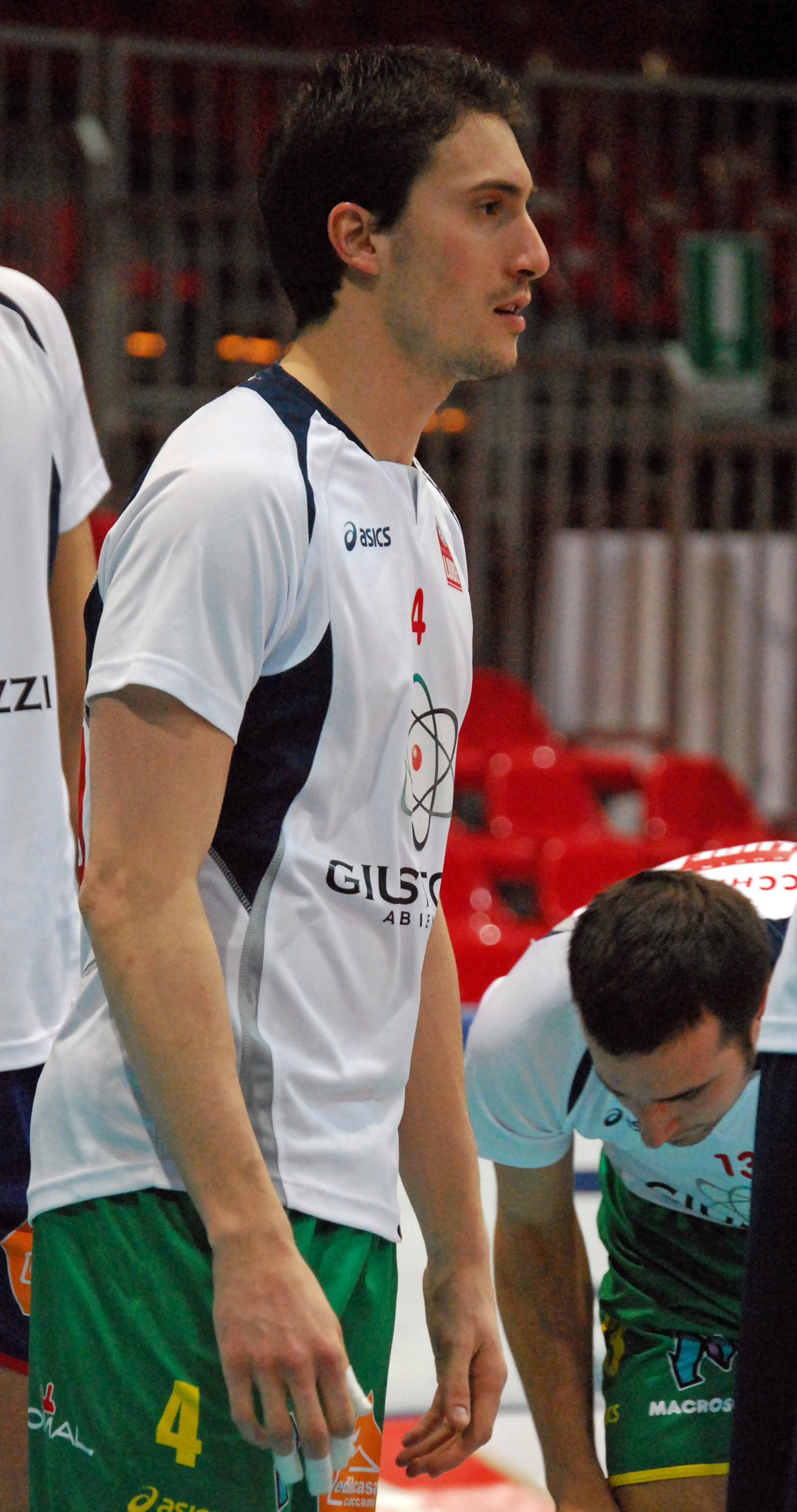

Personal information
- Born: 17 August 1981 (age 45); San Severino Marche, Italy
- Height: 1.91 m (6 ft 3 in)
- Weight: 75 kg (165 lb)
- Spike: 335 cm (132 in)
- Block: 322 cm (127 in)

Volleyball information
- Position: Libero/Receiver
- Current team: (Italy) Lube Banca Macerata
- Number: 4

National team
Italy
Honours
Men's volleyball
Representing Italy
European Championships
Gold medal – first place	2005 Italy/Serbia
- Last updated: 4 May 2014

Alessandro Paparoni (born 17 August 1981) is an Italian volleyball player. He is a gold medalist of European Championship 2005. Paparoni competed for Italy at the 2008 Summer Olympics. He has been playing for Lube Banca Macerata since 2013.

== Career ==
=== Clubs ===
Club	Country	From	To
Lube Banca Macerata	Italy	1997	2002
Dorica Ancona	Italy	2002	2003
Lube Banca Macerata	Italy	2003	2008
Gabeca Montichiari	Italy	2008	2009
Lube Banca Macerata	Italy	2009	2011
M. Roma Volley	Italy	2011	2012
NMV Castellana	Italy	2012	2013
Lube Banca Macerata	Italy	2013	

== Sporting achievements ==
=== Clubs ===
==== CEV Champions League ====
- 2001/2002 – with Lube Banca Macerata

==== CEV Cup ====
- 2000/2001 – with Lube Banca Macerata
- 2004/2005 – with Lube Banca Macerata
- 2005/2006 – with Lube Banca Macerata

==== CEV Challenge Cup ====
- 2010/2011 – with Lube Banca Macerata

==== National championships ====
- 2000/2001 Italian Cup, with Lube Banca Macerata
- 2005/2006 Italian SuperCup, with Lube Banca Macerata
- 2005/2006 Italian Championship, with Lube Banca Macerata
- 2007/2008 Italian Cup, with Lube Banca Macerata
- 2013/2014 Italian Championship, with Lube Banca Macerata

=== National team ===
==== CEV European Championships ====
- 2005 Italy/Serbia
