= 2017–18 CEV Champions League =

- League: CEV Champions League
- Sport: Volleyball
- Duration: Qualifying round: 18 October – 12 November 2017; Main tournament: 5 December 2017 – 13 May 2018
- Number of teams: 32 (20 qual. + 12 main tourn.)

Finals
- Venue: (Russia) Kazan
- Champions: (Russia) Zenit Kazan
- Finals MVP: (Russia) Maxim Mikhaylov

CEV Champions League seasons
- ← 2016–17 2018–19 →

The 2017–18 CEV Champions League was the 59th edition of the highest level European volleyball club competition organised by the European Volleyball Confederation.

== Qualification ==
Rank	Country	Vacancies	Qualified teams
1	Russia	2	Zenit Kazan
1	Russia	2	Dynamo Moscow
2	Italy	2	Cucine Lube Civitanova
2	Italy	2	Diatec Trentino
3	Turkey	2	Halkbank Ankara
3	Turkey	2	Arkas İzmir
4	Poland	2	ZAKSA Kędzierzyn-Koźle
4	Poland	2	PGE Skra Bełchatów
5	France	1	Chaumont VB 52 Haute Marne
6	Belgium	1	Knack Roeselare
7	Germany	1	Berlin Recycling Volleys
8	Greece	1	PAOK Thessaloniki
Qualification round		8	Lokomotiv Novosibirsk
Qualification round		8	Sir Colussi Sicoma Perugia
Qualification round		8	Fenerbahçe SK Istanbul
Qualification round		8	Jastrzębski Węgiel
Qualification round		8	Spacer's Toulouse VB
Qualification round		8	Noliko Maaseik
Qualification round		8	VfB Friedrichshafen
Qualification round		8	Ford Store Levoranta Sastamala

== Pools composition ==
Drawing of Lots was held on 17 November 2017 in Moscow.

Pool A	Pool B	Pool C
Cucine Lube Civitanova	Halkbank Ankara	Chaumont VB 52 Haute Marne
Knack Roeselare	PAOK Thessaloniki	Dynamo Moscow
Sir Colussi Sicoma Perugia	VfB Friedrichshafen	PGE Skra Bełchatów
Fenerbahçe SK Istanbul	Ford Store Levoranta Sastamala	Lokomotiv Novosibirsk

Pool D	Pool E
Zenit Kazan	ZAKSA Kędzierzyn-Koźle
Berlin Recycling Volleys	Diatec Trentino
Spacer's Toulouse VB	Arkas İzmir
Jastrzębski Węgiel	Noliko Maaseik

== League round ==
- All times are local

=== Pool A ===
Pos	Team	Pld	W	L	Pts	SW	SL	SR	SPW	SPL	SPR	Qualification
1	(Italy) Sir Colussi Sicoma Perugia	6	6	0	16	18	5	3.600	546	476	1.147	Playoffs
2	(Italy) Cucine Lube Civitanova	6	4	2	13	14	7	2.000	500	448	1.116	Playoffs
3	(Belgium) Knack Roeselare	6	2	4	7	8	14	0.571	481	483	0.996	
4	(Turkey) Fenerbahçe SK Istanbul	6	0	6	0	4	18	0.222	416	536	0.776	

Date	Time		Score		Set 1	Set 2	Set 3	Set 4	Set 5	Total	Report
6 Dec	20:30	Sir Colussi Sicoma Perugia (Italy)	3–2	(Italy) Cucine Lube Civitanova	28–30	20–25	25–23	25–19	15–9	113–106	Report
7 Dec	18:00	Fenerbahçe SK Istanbul (Turkey)	1–3	(Belgium) Knack Roeselare	20–25	19–25	25–21	16–25		80–96	Report
20 Dec	18:00	Fenerbahçe SK Istanbul (Turkey)	0–3	(Italy) Sir Colussi Sicoma Perugia	20–25	21–25	23–25			64–75	Report
21 Dec	20:00	Cucine Lube Civitanova (Italy)	3–0	(Belgium) Knack Roeselare	25–22	26–24	25–22			76–68	Report
16 Jan	20:30	Knack Roeselare (Belgium)	2–3	(Italy) Sir Colussi Sicoma Perugia	25–21	25–27	15–25	25–21	12–15	102–109	Report
17 Jan	20:30	Cucine Lube Civitanova (Italy)	3–1	(Turkey) Fenerbahçe SK Istanbul	25–22	25–11	21–25	25–12		96–70	Report
31 Jan	18:00	Fenerbahçe SK Istanbul (Turkey)	0–3	(Italy) Cucine Lube Civitanova	20–25	19–25	18–25			57–75	Report
31 Jan	18:00	Sir Colussi Sicoma Perugia (Italy)	3–0	(Belgium) Knack Roeselare	25–16	25–22	25–17			75–55	Report
13 Feb	20:30	Knack Roeselare (Belgium)	0–3	(Italy) Cucine Lube Civitanova	16–25	23–25	23–25			62–75	Report
15 Feb	20:30	Sir Colussi Sicoma Perugia (Italy)	3–1	(Turkey) Fenerbahçe SK Istanbul	25–22	25–12	20–25	25–18		95–77	Report
28 Feb	20:30	Knack Roeselare (Belgium)	3–1	(Turkey) Fenerbahçe SK Istanbul	25–19	25–9	23–25	25–15		98–68	Report
28 Feb	20:30	Cucine Lube Civitanova (Italy)	0–3	(Italy) Sir Colussi Sicoma Perugia	24–26	23–25	25–27			72–78	Report

=== Pool B ===
Pos	Team	Pld	W	L	Pts	SW	SL	SR	SPW	SPL	SPR	Qualification
1	(Germany) VfB Friedrichshafen	6	6	0	17	18	4	4.500	533	412	1.294	Playoffs
2	(Turkey) Halkbank Ankara	6	3	3	9	12	10	1.200	513	491	1.045	Playoffs
3	(Greece) PAOK Thessaloniki	6	2	4	8	11	14	0.786	547	581	0.941	
4	(Finland) Ford Store Levoranta Sastamala	6	1	5	2	4	17	0.235	423	514	0.823	

Date	Time		Score		Set 1	Set 2	Set 3	Set 4	Set 5	Total	Report
5 Dec	19:00	Ford Store Levoranta Sastamala (Finland)	3–2	(Greece) PAOK Thessaloniki	25–19	27–29	33–35	25–23	15–11	125–117	Report
7 Dec	20:00	VfB Friedrichshafen (Germany)	3–1	(Turkey) Halkbank Ankara	25–14	25–23	21–25	28–26		99–88	Report
19 Dec	19:00	Ford Store Levoranta Sastamala (Finland)	0–3	(Germany) VfB Friedrichshafen	22–25	15–25	15–25			52–75	Report
21 Dec	17:30	Halkbank Ankara (Turkey)	3–1	(Greece) PAOK Thessaloniki	25–21	24–26	25–20	25–22		99–89	Report
17 Jan	17:30	Halkbank Ankara (Turkey)	3–0	(Finland) Ford Store Levoranta Sastamala	25–22	25–21	25–16			75–59	Report
18 Jan	19:00	PAOK Thessaloniki (Greece)	2–3	(Germany) VfB Friedrichshafen	25–17	30–28	14–25	17–25	9–15	95–110	Report
31 Jan	20:00	VfB Friedrichshafen (Germany)	3–0	(Greece) PAOK Thessaloniki	25–22	25–17	25–18			75–57	Report
1 Feb	19:00	Ford Store Levoranta Sastamala (Finland)	0–3	(Turkey) Halkbank Ankara	21–25	18–25	21–25			60–75	Report
13 Feb	19:00	PAOK Thessaloniki (Greece)	3–1	(Turkey) Halkbank Ankara	25–16	16–25	26–24	25–20		92–85	Report
14 Feb	20:00	VfB Friedrichshafen (Germany)	3–0	(Finland) Ford Store Levoranta Sastamala	25–15	25–13	25–12			75–40	Report
28 Feb	17:30	Halkbank Ankara (Turkey)	1–3	(Germany) VfB Friedrichshafen	14–25	21–25	26–24	19–25		80–99	Report
28 Feb	19:00	PAOK Thessaloniki (Greece)	3–1	(Finland) Ford Store Levoranta Sastamala	22–25	25–22	25–20	25–20		97–87	Report

=== Pool C ===
Pos	Team	Pld	W	L	Pts	SW	SL	SR	SPW	SPL	SPR	Qualification
1	(Russia) Lokomotiv Novosibirsk	6	5	1	13	15	8	1.875	521	501	1.040	Playoffs
2	(Poland) PGE Skra Bełchatów	6	3	3	9	12	12	1.000	532	536	0.993	Playoffs
3	(France) Chaumont VB 52 Haute Marne	6	3	3	8	13	14	0.929	585	602	0.972	Playoffs
4	(Russia) Dynamo Moscow	6	1	5	6	10	16	0.625	555	576	0.964	

Date	Time		Score		Set 1	Set 2	Set 3	Set 4	Set 5	Total	Report
6 Dec	18:00	PGE Skra Bełchatów (Poland)	1–3	(France) Chaumont VB 52 Haute Marne	25–19	18–25	19–25	27–29		89–98	Report
7 Dec	19:30	Lokomotiv Novosibirsk (Russia)	3–0	(Russia) Dynamo Moscow	25–23	25–17	25–22			75–62	Report
20 Dec	19:30	Lokomotiv Novosibirsk (Russia)	3–0	(Poland) PGE Skra Bełchatów	25–18	25–18	25–19			75–55	Report
20 Dec	20:30	Chaumont VB 52 Haute Marne (France)	3–2	(Russia) Dynamo Moscow	22–25	19–25	25–22	25–22	15–11	106–105	Report
16 Jan	20:30	Chaumont VB 52 Haute Marne (France)	2–3	(Russia) Lokomotiv Novosibirsk	27–29	25–22	25–18	19–25	15–17	111–111	Report
17 Jan	19:00	Dynamo Moscow (Russia)	2–3	(Poland) PGE Skra Bełchatów	15–25	25–23	20–25	25–23	12–15	97–111	Report
31 Jan	19:30	Lokomotiv Novosibirsk (Russia)	3–1	(France) Chaumont VB 52 Haute Marne	23–25	25–22	25–19	25–18		98–84	Report
31 Jan	18:00	PGE Skra Bełchatów (Poland)	3–1	(Russia) Dynamo Moscow	25–23	22–25	25–22	25–13		97–83	Report
13 Feb	18:00	PGE Skra Bełchatów (Poland)	3–0	(Russia) Lokomotiv Novosibirsk	25–19	25–15	25–19			75–53	Report
14 Feb	19:00	Dynamo Moscow (Russia)	3–1	(France) Chaumont VB 52 Haute Marne	25–16	19–25	25–19	25–18		94–78	Report
28 Feb	19:00	Dynamo Moscow (Russia)	2–3	(Russia) Lokomotiv Novosibirsk	25–16	25–21	21–25	24–26	19–21	114–109	Report
28 Feb	20:30	Chaumont VB 52 Haute Marne (France)	3–2	(Poland) PGE Skra Bełchatów	25–22	25–19	20–25	22–25	16–14	108–105	Report

=== Pool D ===
Pos	Team	Pld	W	L	Pts	SW	SL	SR	SPW	SPL	SPR	Qualification
1	(Russia) Zenit Kazan (Note: Qualified as hosts) (H)	6	6	0	18	18	3	6.000	528	414	1.275	Final Four
2	(Poland) Jastrzębski Węgiel	6	3	3	9	11	11	1.000	464	486	0.955	Playoffs
3	(Germany) Berlin Recycling Volleys	6	3	3	8	11	12	0.917	511	509	1.004	Playoffs
4	(France) Spacer's Toulouse VB	6	0	6	1	4	18	0.222	437	533	0.820	

(H) Host
Notes:

Date	Time		Score		Set 1	Set 2	Set 3	Set 4	Set 5	Total	Report
6 Dec	20:00	Spacer's Toulouse VB (France)	1–3	(Russia) Zenit Kazan	31–29	20–25	23–25	19–25		93–104	Report
6 Dec	20:30	Jastrzębski Węgiel (Poland)	3–0	(Germany) Berlin Recycling Volleys	25–21	25–19	26–24			76–64	Report
19 Dec	18:00	Jastrzębski Węgiel (Poland)	3–0	(France) Spacer's Toulouse VB	25–10	25–21	25–20			75–51	Report
21 Dec	19:00	Zenit Kazan (Russia)	3–1	(Germany) Berlin Recycling Volleys	25–20	25–19	25–27	25–22		100–88	Report
16 Jan	18:00	Zenit Kazan (Russia)	3–0	(Poland) Jastrzębski Węgiel	25–13	25–23	25–12			75–48	Report
17 Jan	19:30	Berlin Recycling Volleys (Germany)	3–0	(France) Spacer's Toulouse VB	25–15	28–26	25–16			78–57	Report
30 Jan	20:00	Spacer's Toulouse VB (France)	1–3	(Germany) Berlin Recycling Volleys	20–25	25–15	23–25	18–25		86–90	Report
31 Jan	20:30	Jastrzębski Węgiel (Poland)	0–3	(Russia) Zenit Kazan	24–26	20–25	18–25			62–76	Report
13 Feb	20:00	Spacer's Toulouse VB (France)	2–3	(Poland) Jastrzębski Węgiel	17–25	22–25	25–23	25–23	12–15	101–111	Report
14 Feb	19:30	Berlin Recycling Volleys (Germany)	1–3	(Russia) Zenit Kazan	17–25	20–25	25–23	23–25		85–98	Report
28 Feb	19:00	Zenit Kazan (Russia)	3–0	(France) Spacer's Toulouse VB	25–15	25–10	25–13			75–38	Report
28 Feb	20:00	Berlin Recycling Volleys (Germany)	3–2	(Poland) Jastrzębski Węgiel	23–25	25–16	18–25	25–17	15–9	106–92	Report

=== Pool E ===
Pos	Team	Pld	W	L	Pts	SW	SL	SR	SPW	SPL	SPR	Qualification
1	(Poland) ZAKSA Kędzierzyn-Koźle	6	5	1	14	17	7	2.429	560	521	1.075	Playoffs
2	(Italy) Diatec Trentino	6	4	2	14	16	9	1.778	589	526	1.120	Playoffs
3	(Belgium) Noliko Maaseik	6	3	3	7	11	13	0.846	534	549	0.973	Playoffs
4	(Turkey) Arkas İzmir	6	0	6	1	3	18	0.167	426	513	0.830	

Date	Time		Score		Set 1	Set 2	Set 3	Set 4	Set 5	Total	Report
5 Dec	20:30	Noliko Maaseik (Belgium)	1–3	(Italy) Diatec Trentino	17–25	23–25	25–23	17–25		82–98	Report
6 Dec	19:00	Arkas İzmir (Turkey)	0–3	(Poland) ZAKSA Kędzierzyn-Koźle	23–25	28–30	23–25			74–80	Report
20 Dec	20:30	ZAKSA Kędzierzyn-Koźle (Poland)	3–2	(Italy) Diatec Trentino	18–25	24–26	25–23	25–16	15–12	107–102	Report
20 Dec	20:30	Noliko Maaseik (Belgium)	3–2	(Turkey) Arkas İzmir	25–23	22–25	23–25	25–21	15–10	110–104	Report
17 Jan	20:30	ZAKSA Kędzierzyn-Koźle (Poland)	3–0	(Belgium) Noliko Maaseik	25–22	25–20	25–18			75–60	Report
18 Jan	20:30	Diatec Trentino (Italy)	3–0	(Turkey) Arkas İzmir	25–22	26–24	25–17			76–63	Report
30 Jan	20:30	Noliko Maaseik (Belgium)	3–2	(Poland) ZAKSA Kędzierzyn-Koźle	26–24	24–26	25–20	22–25	17–15	114–110	Report
1 Feb	19:00	Arkas İzmir (Turkey)	1–3	(Italy) Diatec Trentino	25–22	9–25	17–25	17–25		68–97	Report
14 Feb	20:30	Arkas İzmir (Turkey)	0–3	(Belgium) Noliko Maaseik	16–25	21–25	21–25			58–75	Report
14 Feb	20:30	Diatec Trentino (Italy)	2–3	(Poland) ZAKSA Kędzierzyn-Koźle	25–23	22–25	25–27	25–21	15–17	112–113	Report
28 Feb	18:00	ZAKSA Kędzierzyn-Koźle (Poland)	3–0	(Turkey) Arkas İzmir	25–17	25–19	25–23			75–59	Report
28 Feb	20:30	Diatec Trentino (Italy)	3–1	(Belgium) Noliko Maaseik	25–16	29–27	24–26	26–24		104–93	Report

=== Third place ranking ===
Pos	Team	Pld	W	L	Pts	SW	SL	SR	SPW	SPL	SPR	Qualification
1	(France) Chaumont VB 52 Haute Marne	6	3	3	8	13	14	0.929	585	602	0.972	Playoffs
2	(Germany) Berlin Recycling Volleys	6	3	3	8	11	12	0.917	511	509	1.004	Playoffs
3	(Belgium) Noliko Maaseik	6	3	3	7	11	13	0.846	534	549	0.973	Playoffs
4	(Greece) PAOK Thessaloniki	6	2	4	8	11	14	0.786	547	581	0.941	
5	(Belgium) Knack Roeselare	6	2	4	7	8	14	0.571	481	483	0.996	

== Playoffs ==
=== Playoff 12 ===
Team 1	Agg.	Team 2	1st leg	2nd leg	Golden Set
Halkbank Ankara (Turkey)	0–6	(Italy) Sir Colussi Sicoma Perugia	0–3	0–3	
Noliko Maaseik (Belgium)	3–3	(Russia) Lokomotiv Novosibirsk	3–0	1–3	12–15
PGE Skra Bełchatów (Poland)	1–5	(Italy) Cucine Lube Civitanova	2–3	0–3	
Chaumont VB 52 Haute Marne (France)	2–4	(Italy) Diatec Trentino	3–2	0–3	
Jastrzębski Węgiel (Poland)	0–6	(Poland) ZAKSA Kędzierzyn-Koźle	1–3	0–3	
Berlin Recycling Volleys (Germany)	1–5	(Germany) VfB Friedrichshafen	2–3	0–3	

==== First leg ====
Date	Time		Score		Set 1	Set 2	Set 3	Set 4	Set 5	Total	Report
13 Mar	17:30	Halkbank Ankara (Turkey)	0–3	(Italy) Sir Colussi Sicoma Perugia	18–25	22–25	29–31			69–81	Report
14 Mar	20:30	Noliko Maaseik (Belgium)	3–0	(Russia) Lokomotiv Novosibirsk	25–23	26–24	30–28			81–75	Report
14 Mar	18:00	PGE Skra Bełchatów (Poland)	2–3	(Italy) Cucine Lube Civitanova	27–25	28–26	13–25	22–25	10–15	100–116	Report
14 Mar	20:30	Chaumont VB 52 Haute Marne (France)	3–2	(Italy) Diatec Trentino	17–25	25–22	25–20	21–25	15–10	103–102	Report
14 Mar	20:30	Jastrzębski Węgiel (Poland)	1–3	(Poland) ZAKSA Kędzierzyn-Koźle	19–25	19–25	25–21	33–35		96–106	Report
14 Mar	19:30	Berlin Recycling Volleys (Germany)	2–3	(Germany) VfB Friedrichshafen	22–25	25–23	23–25	25–18	12–15	107–106	Report

==== Second leg ====
Date	Time		Score		Set 1	Set 2	Set 3	Set 4	Set 5	Total	Report
21 Mar	20:30	Sir Colussi Sicoma Perugia (Italy)	3–0	(Turkey) Halkbank Ankara	25–23	25–23	25–13			75–59	Report
21 Mar	19:30	Lokomotiv Novosibirsk (Russia)	3–1	(Belgium) Noliko Maaseik	25–18	25–22	19–25	26–24		95–89	Report
Golden set		Lokomotiv Novosibirsk (Russia)	15–12	(Belgium) Noliko Maaseik							
22 Mar	20:30	Cucine Lube Civitanova (Italy)	3–0	(Poland) PGE Skra Bełchatów	25–17	25–18	25–21			75–56	Report
20 Mar	20:30	Diatec Trentino (Italy)	3–0	(France) Chaumont VB 52 Haute Marne	26–24	25–23	27–25			78–72	Report
21 Mar	20:00	ZAKSA Kędzierzyn-Koźle (Poland)	3–0	(Poland) Jastrzębski Węgiel	25–21	25–20	25–12			75–53	Report
22 Mar	20:00	VfB Friedrichshafen (Germany)	3–0	(Germany) Berlin Recycling Volleys	25–19	25–23	25–22			75–64	Report

=== Playoff 6 ===
Team 1	Agg.	Team 2	1st leg	2nd leg
Sir Colussi Sicoma Perugia (Italy)	4–2	(Russia) Lokomotiv Novosibirsk	3–1	2–3
Cucine Lube Civitanova (Italy)	5–1	(Italy) Diatec Trentino	3–1	3–2
ZAKSA Kędzierzyn-Koźle (Poland)	5–1	(Germany) VfB Friedrichshafen	3–2	3–0

==== First leg ====
Date	Time		Score		Set 1	Set 2	Set 3	Set 4	Set 5	Total	Report
4 April	20:30	Sir Colussi Sicoma Perugia (Italy)	3–1	(Russia) Lokomotiv Novosibirsk	24–26	25–15	25–19	25–21		99–81	Report
4 April	20:30	Cucine Lube Civitanova (Italy)	3–1	(Italy) Diatec Trentino	25–22	23–25	25–19	28–26		101–92	Report
4 April	20:30	ZAKSA Kędzierzyn-Koźle (Poland)	3–2	(Germany) VfB Friedrichshafen	25–23	25–21	22–25	22–25	15–13	109–107	Report

==== Second leg ====
Date	Time		Score		Set 1	Set 2	Set 3	Set 4	Set 5	Total	Report
11 April	19:30	Lokomotiv Novosibirsk (Russia)	3–2	(Italy) Sir Colussi Sicoma Perugia	20–25	25–22	17–25	25–21	15–11	102–104	Report
11 April	20:30	Diatec Trentino (Italy)	2–3	(Italy) Cucine Lube Civitanova	19–25	21–25	25–20	27–25	15–17	107–112	Report
10 April	20:00	VfB Friedrichshafen (Germany)	0–3	(Poland) ZAKSA Kędzierzyn-Koźle	19–25	18–25	13–25			50–75	Report

== Final Four ==
- Organizer: (Russia) Zenit Kazan
- Place: Kazan
- All times are Moscow Time (UTC+03:00).

Semifinals
12 May
(Poland) ZAKSA Kędzierzyn-Koźle	1
(Italy) Cucine Lube Civitanova	3
12 May
(Italy) Sir Colussi Sicoma Perugia	0
(Russia) Zenit Kazan	3

Final
13 May
(Italy) Cucine Lube Civitanova	2
(Russia) Zenit Kazan	3
3rd place match
13 May
(Poland) ZAKSA Kędzierzyn-Koźle	2
(Italy) Sir Colussi Sicoma Perugia	3

=== Semifinals ===
Date	Time		Score		Set 1	Set 2	Set 3	Set 4	Set 5	Total	Report
12 May	16:00	ZAKSA Kędzierzyn-Koźle (Poland)	1–3	(Italy) Cucine Lube Civitanova	21–25	25–22	15–25	18–25		79–97	Report
12 May	19:00	Sir Colussi Sicoma Perugia (Italy)	0–3	(Russia) Zenit Kazan	22–25	20–25	20–25			62–75	Report

=== 3rd place match ===
Date	Time		Score		Set 1	Set 2	Set 3	Set 4	Set 5	Total	Report
13 May	16:00	ZAKSA Kędzierzyn-Koźle (Poland)	2–3	(Italy) Sir Colussi Sicoma Perugia	25–17	27–29	25–19	23–25	7–15	107–105	Report

=== Final ===
Date	Time		Score		Set 1	Set 2	Set 3	Set 4	Set 5	Total	Report
13 May	19:00	Cucine Lube Civitanova (Italy)	2–3	(Russia) Zenit Kazan	27–29	25–18	25–23	23–25	15–17	115–112	Report

== Final standings ==
Qualified for the 2018 FIVB Club World Championship

Rank	Team
1st place, gold medalist(s)	Zenit Kazan
2nd place, silver medalist(s)	Cucine Lube Civitanova
3rd place, bronze medalist(s)	Sir Colussi Sicoma Perugia
4	ZAKSA Kędzierzyn-Koźle

2017–18 CEV Champions League winners

Zenit Kazan
6th title

== Awards ==
- Most valuable player
  (Russia) Maxim Mikhaylov (Zenit Kazan)
- Best setter
  (Russia) Alexander Butko (Zenit Kazan)
- Best outside spikers
  (Italy) Osmany Juantorena (Cucine Lube Civitanova)
  (Cuba) Wilfredo León (Zenit Kazan)
- Best middle blockers
  (Serbia) Dragan Stanković (Cucine Lube Civitanova)
  (Serbia) Marko Podraščanin (Sir Colussi Sicoma Perugia)
- Best opposite spiker
  (Bulgaria) Tsvetan Sokolov (Cucine Lube Civitanova)
- Best libero
  (France) Jenia Grebennikov (Cucine Lube Civitanova)
