= Amir Ghafour =

Iranian volleyball player (born 1991)

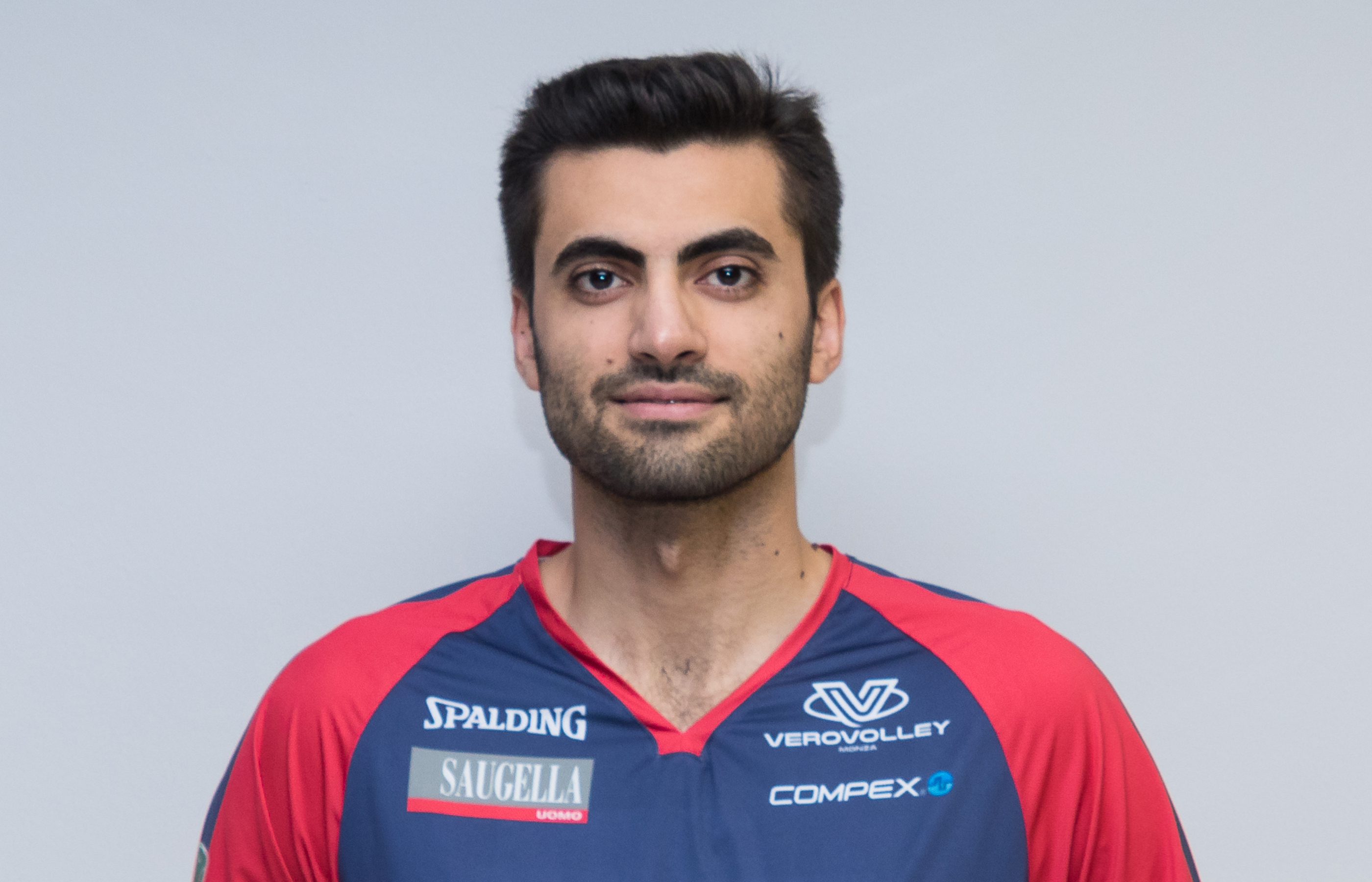
- Amir Ghafour in 2019

Personal information
- Nickname: Emperor
- Nationality: (Iran) Iranian
- Born: 6 June 1991 (age 35) Kashan, Iran
- Height: 2.02 m (6 ft 8 in)
- Weight: 90 kg (198 lb)
- Spike: 371 cm (146 in)
- Block: 350 cm (138 in)

Volleyball information
- Position: Opposite spiker
- Current club: (Iran) Shahdab Yazd
- Number: 10

Career
- Years: Team
- 2009–2014 2014–2015 2015–2017 2017–2018 2018–2019 2019–2020 2020–2021 2021–2022 2022–2023 2023 2023 2023–2024 2024–: (Iran) Barij Essence Kashan (Iran) Shahrdari Varamin (Iran) Paykan Tehran (Iran) Saipa Tehran (Italy) Vero Volley Monza (Italy) Volley Lube (Turkey) Bursa B.B. SK (Iran) Sepahan Isfahan (Iran) Shahdab Yazd (Iraq) Ghaz Al-Junoob (Iran) Shahdab Yazd (Romania) Rapid București (Iran) Shahdab Yazd

National team
- Years: Team
- 2011–2022: Iran
Honours
Representing Iran
Men's volleyball
FIVB World Grand Champions Cup
Bronze medal – third place	2017 Japan
AVC Asian Championship
Gold medal – first place	2011 Tehran
Gold medal – first place	2013 Dubai
Gold medal – first place	2019 Tehran

Amir Ghafour (Persian: امیر غفور , born 6 June 1991 in Kashan) is an Iranian volleyball player who plays as an opposite spiker for Iranian club Shahdab Yazd. He is a former member of the Iranian national team.

== Career ==
=== National team ===
He was invited to national team in 2011 and made his debut in the adult Iranian national team and participated in the Asian Championship, when Iran won inaugural gold medals. Ghafour debut national game as a fix player in 2012 Summer Olympics qualification with invitations Julio Velasco. Ghafour helped the Iran national team win the second gold medal Asian Championship in 2013 and was named Best Spiker in the tournament. Ghafour competed at the Rio 2016 Summer Olympics. He helped Iran to win a bronze medal in 2017 FIVB Volleyball Men's World Grand Champions Cup and Iran Best scorer with 90 point.

In 2023, it's announced that Amir Ghafour ended his national team career.

=== Clubs ===
Amir Ghafour's career began in 2009, with the Barij Essence Kashan. He after 9 consecutive years played in different Iranian teams like Paykan Tehran, and in 2019 year move to Italian SuperLega. He after having played his first season in Italy with the Vero Volley Monza, joined to the Cucine Lube Civitanova.

== Sporting achievements ==
- FIVB Club World Championship
  - Brazil 2019 – with Cucine Lube Civitanova
- CEV Challenge Cup
  - 2018/2019 – with Vero Volley Monza
- National championships
  - 2015/2016 Iranian Championship, with Paykan Tehran
  - 2016/2017 Iranian Championship, with Paykan Tehran
  - 2019/2020 Italian Cup, with Cucine Lube Civitanova
- National team
  - 2008 AVC U18 Asian Championship
  - 2009 FIVB U19 World Championship
  - 2010 AVC U20 Asian Championship
  - 2011 AVC Asian Championship
  - 2013 AVC Asian Championship
  - 2014 Asian Games
  - 2017 FIVB World Grand Champions Cup
  - 2018 Asian Games
  - 2019 AVC Asian Championship

=== Individual awards ===
- 2011: FIVB U21 World Championship – Best server
- 2013: AVC Asian Championship – Best spiker
- 2019: AVC Asian Championship – Best opposite
- 2023: Asian Club Championship – Best opposite
