= Simone Anzani =

Italian volleyball player (born 1992)

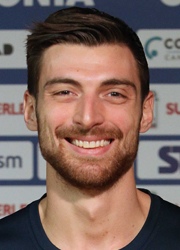

Personal information
- Nationality: Italian
- Born: 24 February 1992 (age 34); Como, Italy
- Height: 2.04 m (6 ft 8 in)
- Weight: 100 kg (220 lb)
- Spike: 350 cm (138 in)
- Block: 330 cm (130 in)

Volleyball information
- Position: Middle blocker
- Current club: Rana Verona
- Number: 17

Career
Years	Teams
2008–2011; 2011–2012; 2012–2013; 2013–2017; 2017–2018; 2018–2019; 2019–2024; 2024–2026; 2026–	Sisley Treviso; Pallavolo Loreto; Argos Volley; Calzedonia Verona; Sir Safety Perugia; Modena Volley; Cucine Lube Civitanova; Modena Volley; Rana Verona

National team
2012–2025	Italy
Honours
Men's volleyball
Representing Italy
FIVB World Championship
Gold medal – first place	2022 Poland/Slovenia
Gold medal – first place	2025 Philippines
World Cup
Silver medal – second place	2015 Japan
World League
Bronze medal – third place	2014 Florence
FIVB Nations League
Silver medal – second place	2025 Ningbo
European Championship
Gold medal – first place	2021 Poland/Czechia/Estonia/Finland
Bronze medal – third place	2015 Bulgaria/Italy
- Last updated: 2 January 2018

Simone Anzani (born 24 February 1992 in Como) is an Italian professional volleyball player who plays as a middle blocker for Lega Pallavolo Serie A club Rana Verona, silver medalist of the 2015 World Cup, bronze medalist of the 2015 European Championship and the 2014 World League.

He was a member of Italy men's national volleyball team to win 2022 FIVB Volleyball Men's World Championship, and retired from international volleyball after the 2025 World Championships in the Philippines.

== Sporting achievements ==
=== Clubs ===
- FIVB Club World Championship
  - Brazil 2019 – with Cucine Lube Civitanova
  - Brazil 2021 – with Cucine Lube Civitanova

==== National championships ====
- 2022/2023 Italian Championship, with Cucine Lube Civitanova
