= Volley Lube =

Italian volleyball team

Cucine Lube Civitanova
- Full name: Associazione Sportiva Volley Lube
- Short name: Lube
- Founded: 1990
- Ground: PalaCivitanova; Civitanova Marche (Capacity: 4,200)
- Chairman: Simona Sileoni
- Manager: Giampaolo Medei
- Captain: Fabio Balaso
- League: Italian Volleyball League
- Website: Club home page

Uniforms
Home	Away

Associazione Sportiva Volley Lube is a professional volleyball team based in Treia, Italy. Since 1995 the club has been playing in the Serie A of the Italian Volleyball League. It won the Italian Championship seven times, the Italian Cup five times, and the Italian SuperCup three-times.

At European level, Lube won two CEV Champions League in 2002 and 2019, the CEV Cup in 2001, 2005, 2006 and a CEV Challenge Cup 2011. In 2019, it won the FIVB Men's Club World Volleyball Championship.

== Achievements ==
- CEV Champions League
  (×2) 2002, 2019
  (×1) 2018
  (×2) 2016, 2017
- CEV Challenge Cup
  (×4) 2001, 2005, 2006, 2011
  (×1) 2003
  (×1) 1998
- FIVB Club World Championship
  (×1) 2019
  (×3) 2017, 2018, 2021
- Italian Championship
  (×7) 2006, 2012, 2014, 2017, 2019, 2021, 2022
  (×2) 2018, 2023
  (×5) 2003, 2004, 2009, 2011, 2013
- Italian Cup
  (×8) 2001, 2003, 2008, 2009, 2017, 2020, 2021, 2025
  (×4) 2012, 2013, 2018, 2019
- Italian SuperCup
  (×4) 2006, 2008, 2012, 2014
  (×7) 2001, 2003, 2009, 2013, 2017, 2020, 2022

== Former names ==
- 1990–1994: Lube Carima Treia
- 1994–1995: Lube Carima Macerata
- 1995–2012: Lube Banca Marche Macerata
- 2012–2014: Cucine Lube Banca Marche Macerata
- 2014–2015: Cucine Lube Banca Marche Treia
- 2015–2016: Cucine Lube Banca Marche Civitanova
- 2016–present: Cucine Lube Civitanova

== Grounds ==
Although until the landing in Serie A2 the team kept the name of the town Treia (a village near Macerata), given the lack of a building or a simple gym it was immediately associated with the PalaFontescodella, which was the historic building of the Lube until 2015. The small capacity of the building (2,100 seats) condemned it to play all the Champions League matches and the important Serie A1 matches in larger arenas around the Marche (Pesaro, Ancona etc ...). After an infinite number of disputes with the Municipality of Macerata (owner of the building) for the expansion of the sports hall, the team decided to accept the offer of the Municipality of Civitanova Marche to move to a new sports hall built by them exclusively for Lube. The new 4,200-seat sports hall was inaugurated in 2015 and was called Eurosuole Forum for sponsorship reasons.

== Team ==
Team roster – season 2023/2024

No.	Name	Date of birth	Position
1	(France) Barthélémy Chinenyeze	February 28, 1998 (age 27)	Middle blocker
4	(Italy) Matheus Motzo	September 9, 1999 (age 26)	Opposite
6	(Italy) Francesco Bisotto	May 20, 2002 (age 23)	Libero
7	(Italy) Fabio Balaso	October 20, 1995 (age 30)	Libero
9	(Italy) Ivan Zaytsev	October 2, 1988 (age 37)	Opposite
10	(Turkey) Adis Lagumdžija	March 29, 1999 (age 26)	Opposite
11	(Bulgaria) Aleksandar Nikolov	November 30, 2003 (age 22)	Outside hitter
12	(Italy) Enrico Diamantini	April 4, 1993 (age 32)	Middle blocker
15	(Argentina) Luciano De Cecco	June 2, 1988 (age 37)	Setter
17	(Italy) Simone Anzani	February 24, 1992 (age 33)	Middle blocker
21	(Italy) Mattia Bottolo	January 3, 2000 (age 26)	Outside hitter
22	(Italy) Jacopo Larizza	August 22, 1998 (age 27)	Middle blocker
23	(Cuba) Marlon Yant	May 23, 2001 (age 24)	Outside hitter
Head coach: (Italy) Gianlorenzo Blengini; Assistant: (Italy) Romano Giannini

Team roster - season 2022/2023
No.	Name	Date of birth	Position
1	(Puerto Rico) Gabi García Fernández	January 8, 1999 (age 27)	opposite
3	(Italy) Daniele Sottile	August 17, 1979 (age 46)	setter
6	(Italy) Francesco D'Amico	October 9, 1999 (age 26)	libero
7	(Italy) Fabio Balaso	October 20, 1995 (age 30)	libero
9	(Italy) Ivan Zaytsev	October 2, 1988 (age 37)	opposite
10	(France) Barthélémy Chinenyeze	February 28, 1998 (age 27)	middle blocker
11	(Bulgaria) Aleksandar Nikolov	November 30, 2003 (age 22)	outside hitter
12	(Italy) Enrico Diamantini	April 4, 1993 (age 32)	middle blocker
13	(Italy) Mattia Gottardo	February 26, 2001 (age 24)	outside hitter
14	(Italy) Ionut Ambrose	August 13, 2004 (age 21)	middle blocker
15	(Argentina) Luciano De Cecco	June 2, 1988 (age 37)	setter
17	(Italy) Simone Anzani	February 24, 1992 (age 33)	middle blocker
21	(Italy) Mattia Bottolo	January 3, 2000 (age 26)	outside hitter
23	(Cuba) Marlon Yant	May 23, 2001 (age 24)	outside hitter
Head coach: (Italy) Gianlorenzo Blengini; Assistant: (Italy) Romano Giannini

Team roster - season 2021/2022
No.	Name	Date of birth	Position
1	(Puerto Rico) Gabi García Fernández	January 8, 1999 (age 27)	opposite
2	(Italy) Jiří Kovář	April 10, 1989 (age 36)	outside hitter
3	(Italy) Daniele Sottile	August 17, 1979 (age 46)	setter
4	(Italy) Andrea Marchisio	November 6, 1990 (age 35)	libero
5	(Italy) Osmany Juantorena (C)	August 12, 1985 (age 40)	outside hitter
6	(Italy) Rok Jerončič	November 10, 2001 (age 24)	middle blocker
7	(Italy) Fabio Balaso	October 20, 1995 (age 30)	libero
8	(Brazil) Ricardo Lucarelli	February 14, 1992 (age 33)	outside hitter
9	(Italy) Ivan Zaytsev	October 2, 1988 (age 37)	opposite / outside hitter
12	(Italy) Enrico Diamantini	April 4, 1993 (age 32)	outside hitter
13	(Cuba) Robertlandy Simón	June 11, 1987 (age 38)	middle blocker
15	(Argentina) Luciano De Cecco	June 2, 1988 (age 37)	setter
17	(Italy) Simone Anzani	February 24, 1992 (age 33)	middle blocker
23	(Cuba) Marlon Yant	May 23, 2001 (age 24)	outside hitter
Head coach: Gianlorenzo Blengini; Assistant: Romano Giannini

Team roster - season 2020/2021
No.	Name	Date of birth	Position
2	(Italy) Jiri Kovar		outside hitter
4	(Italy) Andrea Marchisio		libero
5	(Italy) Osmany Juantorena		outside hitter
7	(Italy) Fabio Balaso		libero
9	(Brazil) Yoandy Leal		outside hitter
10	(Italy) Jacopo Larizza		middle blocker
11	(Luxembourg) Kamil Rychlicki		opposite
12	(Italy) Enrico Diamantini		middle blocker
13	(Cuba) Robertlandy Simon		middle blocker
15	(Argentina) Luciano De Cecco		setter
17	(Italy) Simone Anzani		middle blocker
18	(Italy) Marco Falaschi		setter
22	(Czech Republic) Jan Hadrava		opposite
23	(Cuba) Marlon Yant Herrera		outside hitter
Head coach: Ferdinando de Giorgi (until February 25, 2021), Gianlorenzo Blengini (from February 25, 2021); Assistant: Nicola Giolito (until February 25, 2021), Enrico Massaccesi (from February 25, 2021)

Team roster - season 2019/2020
No.	Name	Date of birth	Position
1	(Italy) Simone Anzani		middle blocker
2	(Italy) Jiri Kovar		outside hitter
3	(Belgium) Stijn d'Hulst		setter
4	(Italy) Andrea Marchisio		libero
5	(Italy) Osmany Juantorena		outside hitter
6	(Italy) Jacopo Massari		outside hitter
9	(Brazil) Yoandy Leal		outside hitter
10	(Iran) Amir Ghafour		opposite
11	(Luxembourg) Kamil Rychlicki		opposite
12	(Italy) Enrico Diamantini		middle blocker
13	(Cuba) Robertlandy Simon		middle blocker
14	(Brazil) Bruno Rezende		setter
16	(Poland) Mateusz Bieniek		middle blocker
17	(Italy) Fabio Balaso		libero
Head coach: Ferdinando de Giorgi; Assistant: Nicola Giolito

Team roster - season 2018/2019
No.	Name	Date of birth	Position
1	(Bulgaria) Tsvetan Sokolov		opposite
2	(Italy) Jiri Kovar		outside hitter
3	(Belgium) Stijn d'Hulst		setter
4	(Italy) Andrea Marchisio		libero
5	(Italy) Osmany Juantorena		outside hitter
6	(Italy) Jacopo Massari		outside hitter
7	(Serbia) Dragan Stanković		middle blocker
8	(Italy) Enrico Diamantini		middle blocker
9	(Brazil) Yoandy Leal		outside hitter
11	(Italy) Diego Cantagalli		opposite
12	(Italy) Enrico Cester		middle blocker
13	(Cuba) Robertlandy Simon		middle blocker / opposite
14	(Brazil) Bruno Rezende		setter
17	(Italy) Fabio Balaso		libero
Head coach: Ferdinando de Giorgi; Assistant: Marco Camperi

== Notable players ==
- 1994–1999 (Serbia) Slobodan Kovač
- 1996–1998 (Italy) Andrea Zorzi
- 1996–2003 (Italy) Marco Meoni
- 1997–2001 (Italy) Simone Rosalba
- 1997–2002, 2003–2008,
  2009–2011, 2013–2015 (Italy) Alessandro Paparoni
- 1999–2010 (Italy) Mirko Corsano
- 2000–2001 (Serbia) Dejan Brđović
- 2001–2003 (Italy) Pasquale Gravina
- 2001–2002, 2003–2008 (Serbia) Andrija Gerić
- 2001–2005 (Italy) Marco Bracci
- 2001–2003 (Belgium) Wout Wijsmans
- 2002–2003 (Serbia) Edin Škorić
- 2002–2004 (Brazil) Nalbert Bitencourt
- 2002–2005 (Italy) Luigi Mastrangelo
- 2003–2004 (Italy) Fabio Vullo
- 2003–2008 (Serbia) Andrija Gerić
- 2004–2005 (Italy) Lorenzo Bernardi
- 2005–2009 (Brazil) Rodrigão
- 2007–2010 (Poland) Sebastian Świderski
- 2007–2011 (Italy) Valerio Vermiglio
- 2009–2010 (Italy) Alberto Cisolla
- 2010–2011 (Argentina) Facundo Conte
- 2010–2011 (France) Romain Vadeleux
- 2010–2013 (Italy) Cristian Savani
- 2012–2014, 2021–present (Italy) Ivan Zaytsev
- 2012–2014 (Serbia) Saša Starović
- 2012–2015 (France) Hubert Henno
- 2003–2004 (Italy) Leondino Giombini
- 2013–2015 (Poland) Bartosz Kurek
- 2015 (Brazil) Ricardo Garcia
- 2008–2016 (Serbia) Marko Podraščanin
- 2011–2016 (Italy) Simone Parodi
- 2014–2016 (Italy) Alessandro Fei
- 2000–2007, 2015–2016 (Serbia) Ivan Miljković
- 2009–2019 (Serbia) Dragan Stanković
- 2015–2022 (Italy) Osmany Juantorena
- 2015–2018 (France) Jenia Grebennikov
- 2015–2018 (United States) Micah Christenson
- 2016–2019 (Bulgaria) Tsvetan Sokolov
- 2017–2018 (United States) Taylor Sander
- 2018–2020 (Brazil) Bruno Rezende
- 2019–2020 (Iran) Amir Ghafour
- 2018–2022 (Cuba) Robertlandy Simón
- 2021–2022 (Brazil) Ricardo Lucarelli
- 2024–still (Iran) Poriya Hossein Khanzadeh

== Kit manufacturer ==
The table below shows the history of kit providers for the Lube team.

Period	Kit provider
1997–2014	Champion
1997–2014	Nike
1997–2014	Asics
1997–2014	Mizuno
1997–2014	Erreà
2014-2017	Mikasa
2017-	Joma

=== Sponsorship ===
The main sponsor has always been the furniture company Cucine Lube, owner of the team, from 1995 (with the arrival in Serie A1) to 2005 and from 2008 to 2016 another main sponsor was added: the Banca Marche bank. In the 2010/11 season, other shirt sponsors were seen: the agricultural company Oro della Terra, the computer company Microsoft and the University of Macerata. Banca Marche's successor "UBI Banca" was a main sponsor in the 2017/18 season. From 2018 the subsection of Cucine Lube "Creo Kitchens" appeared in the jersey and from 2019 the company Var Group is also seen.
