= 2019 FIVB Volleyball Men's Club World Championship =

Volleyball event

2019 Men's Club World Championship
Tournament details
- Host country: Brazil
- City: Betim
- Dates: 3–8 December
- Teams: 4 (from 3 confederations)
- Venue: 1 (in 1 host city)

Final positions
- Champions: (Italy) Cucine Lube Civitanova (1st title)

Tournament awards
- MVP: (Brazil) Bruno Rezende (LUB)
- Best Setter: (Brazil) Bruno Rezende (LUB)
- Best OH: (Italy) Osmany Juantorena (LUB) (Argentina) Facundo Conte (SDC)
- Best MB: (Russia) Artem Volvich (ZEN) (Cuba) Robertlandy Simón (LUB)
- Best OPP: (Brazil) Evandro Guerra (SDC)
- Best Libero: (Italy) Fabio Balaso (LUB)

Tournament statistics
- Matches played: 10
- Attendance: 24,955 (2,496 per match)

The 2019 FIVB Volleyball Men's Club World Championship was the 15th edition of the event. It was held in Betim, Brazil from 3 to 8 December 2019.

Cucine Lube Civitanova won their first title and Bruno Rezende was chosen to be MVP of the tournament.

== Qualification ==
Team (Confederation)	Qualified as
(Brazil) Sada Cruzeiro (CSV)	Hosts and 2019 South American Champions
(Qatar) Al-Rayyan (AVC)*	2019 Asian 3rd place
(Iran) ~~Shahrdari Varamin VC~~ * (AVC)	2019 Asian Champions*
(Italy) Cucine Lube Civitanova (CEV)	2019 European Champions
(Russia) Zenit Kazan (CEV)	2019 European Runners-up

* Al-Rayyan replaced Shahrdari Varamin (2019 Asian Champions), who were banned by the FIVB. Panasonic Panthers (2019 Asian Runners-up), who were invited by the FIVB before Al-Rayyan, declined the invitation.

== Venue ==
All matches
Betim, Brazil
Ginásio Poliesportivo Divino Braga
Capacity: 6,000
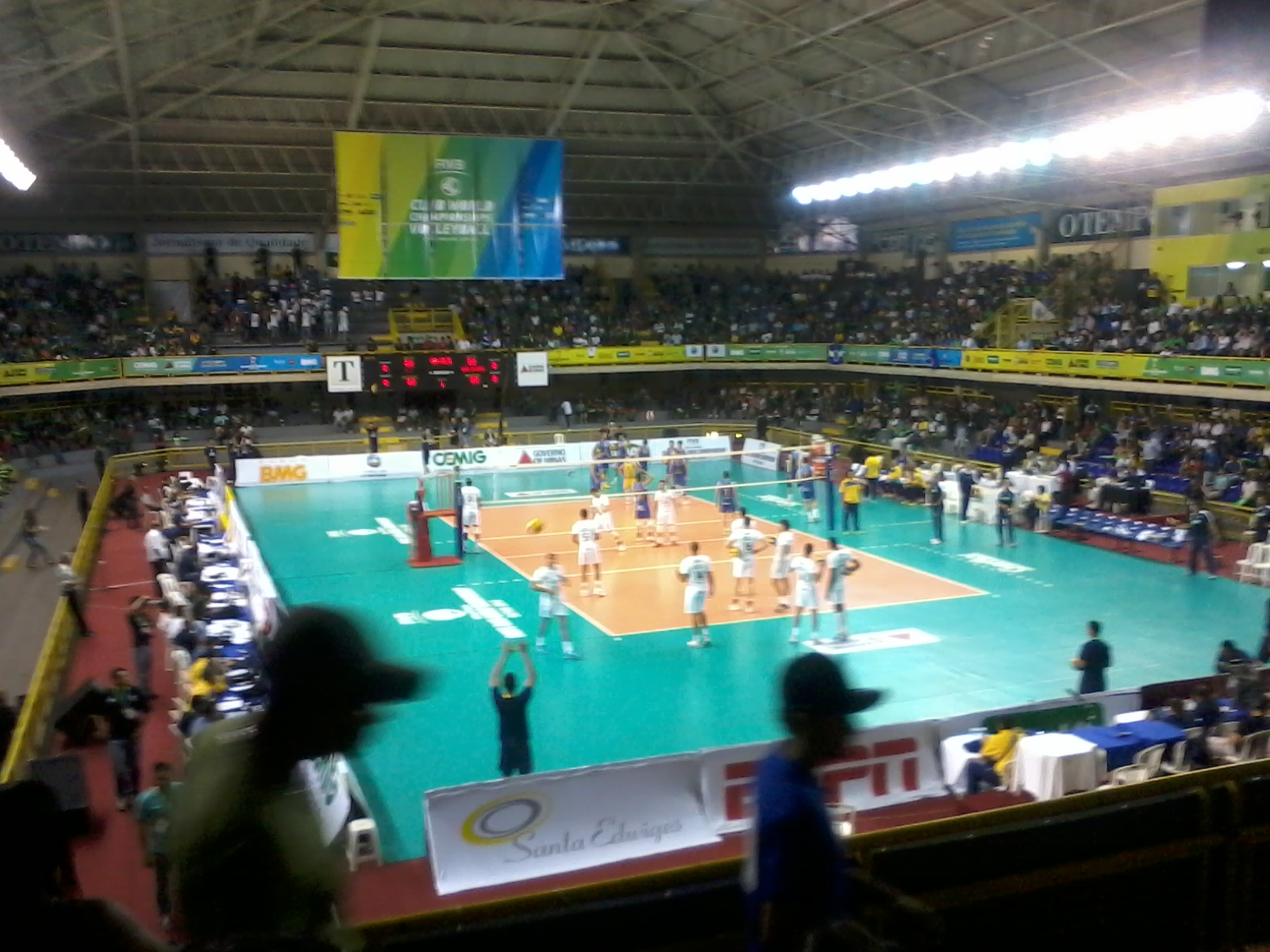

== Pool standing procedure ==
1. Number of matches won
2. Match points
3. Sets ratio
4. Points ratio
5. If the tie continues as per the points ratio between two teams, the priority will be given to the team which won the last match between them. When the tie in points ratio is between three or more teams, a new classification of these teams in the terms of points 1, 2 and 3 will be made taking into consideration only the matches in which they were opposed to each other.

Match won 3–0 or 3–1: 3 match points for the winner, 0 match points for the loser
Match won 3–2: 2 match points for the winner, 1 match point for the loser

== Preliminary round ==
- All times are Brasília Time (UTC−03:00).

Pos	Team	Pld	W	L	Pts	SW	SL	SR	SPW	SPL	SPR	Qualification
1	(Italy) Cucine Lube Civitanova	3	2	1	7	8	3	2.667	247	213	1.160	Semifinals
2	(Brazil) Sada Cruzeiro	3	2	1	6	6	3	2.000	216	195	1.108	Semifinals
3	(Russia) Zenit Kazan	3	2	1	5	6	6	1.000	258	256	1.008	Semifinals
4	(Qatar) Al-Rayyan	3	0	3	0	1	9	0.111	189	246	0.768	Semifinals

Date	Time		Score		Set 1	Set 2	Set 3	Set 4	Set 5	Total	Report
3 Dec	18:00	Cucine Lube Civitanova (Italy)	3–0	(Qatar) Al-Rayyan	25–16	25–18	25–13			75–47	P2
3 Dec	20:30	Sada Cruzeiro (Brazil)	3–0	(Russia) Zenit Kazan	25–20	25–20	25–22			75–62	P2
4 Dec	18:00	Zenit Kazan (Russia)	3–1	(Qatar) Al-Rayyan	21–25	25–20	25–23	25–21		96–89	P2
4 Dec	20:30	Sada Cruzeiro (Brazil)	0–3	(Italy) Cucine Lube Civitanova	23–25	28–30	15–25			66–80	P2
5 Dec	18:00	Cucine Lube Civitanova (Italy)	2–3	(Russia) Zenit Kazan	25–12	25–23	12–25	20–25	10–15	92–100	P2
5 Dec	20:30	Sada Cruzeiro (Brazil)	3–0	(Qatar) Al-Rayyan	25–20	25–16	25–17			75–53	P2

== Final round ==
- All times are Brasília Time (UTC−03:00).

Semifinals
7 December
(Italy) Civitanova	3
(Qatar) Al-Rayyan	0
7 December
(Brazil) Sada	3
(Russia) Kazan	0

Final
8 December
(Italy) Civitanova	3
(Brazil) Sada	1
3rd place match
8 December
(Qatar) Al-Rayyan	0
(Russia) Kazan	3

=== Semifinals ===
Date	Time		Score		Set 1	Set 2	Set 3	Set 4	Set 5	Total	Report
7 Dec	14:00	Cucine Lube Civitanova (Italy)	3–0	(Qatar) Al-Rayyan	25–15	25–17	25–22			75–54	P2
7 Dec	17:00	Sada Cruzeiro (Brazil)	3–0	(Russia) Zenit Kazan	25–21	25–22	25–23			75–66	P2

=== 3rd place match ===
Date	Time		Score		Set 1	Set 2	Set 3	Set 4	Set 5	Total	Report
8 Dec	09:30	Al-Rayyan (Qatar)	0–3	(Russia) Zenit Kazan	21–25	18–25	17–25			56–75	P2

=== Final ===
Date	Time		Score		Set 1	Set 2	Set 3	Set 4	Set 5	Total	Report
8 Dec	12:30	Cucine Lube Civitanova (Italy)	3–1	(Brazil) Sada Cruzeiro	25–23	19–25	31–29	25–21		100–98	P2

== Final standing ==
Rank	Team
1st place, gold medalist(s)	(Italy) Cucine Lube Civitanova
2nd place, silver medalist(s)	(Brazil) Sada Cruzeiro
3rd place, bronze medalist(s)	(Russia) Zenit Kazan
4	(Qatar) Al-Rayyan

2019 Men's Club World Champions

1st title

14–man roster
Simone Anzani, Jiří Kovář, Stijn D'Hulst, Andrea Marchisio, Osmany Juantorena (c), Jacopo Massari, Yoandy Leal, Amir Ghafour, Kamil Rychlicki, Enrico Diamantini, Robertlandy Simón, Bruno Rezende, Mateusz Bieniek, Fabio Balaso
Head coach
Ferdinando De Giorgi

== Awards ==
- Most valuable player
  (Brazil) Bruno Rezende (Cucine Lube Civitanova)
- Best setter
  (Brazil) Bruno Rezende (Cucine Lube Civitanova)
- Best outside spikers
  (Italy) Osmany Juantorena (Cucine Lube Civitanova)
  (Argentina) Facundo Conte (Sada Cruzeiro)
- Best middle blockers
  (Russia) Artem Volvich (Zenit Kazan)
  (Cuba) Robertlandy Simón (Cucine Lube Civitanova)
- Best opposite spiker
  (Brazil) Evandro Guerra (Sada Cruzeiro)
- Best libero
  (Italy) Fabio Balaso (Cucine Lube Civitanova)

== See also ==
- 2019 FIVB Volleyball Women's Club World Championship
