= 2018 FIVB Volleyball Men's Club World Championship =

2018 Men's Club World Championship
Tournament details
- Host country: Poland
- Dates: 26 November – 2 December
- Teams: 8 (from 3 confederations)
- Venues: 3 (in 3 host cities)

Final positions
- Champions: (Italy) Trentino Volley (5th title)

Tournament awards
- MVP: (United States) Aaron Russell (TRE)
- Best Setter: (Italy) Simone Giannelli (TRE)
- Best OH: (Serbia) Uroš Kovačević (TRE) (Russia) Dmitry Volkov (FAK)
- Best MB: (Cuba) Robertlandy Simón (LUB) (Serbia) Dragan Stanković (LUB)
- Best OPP: (Bulgaria) Tsvetan Sokolov (LUB)
- Best Libero: (France) Jenia Grebennikov (TRE)

Tournament statistics
- Matches played: 16
- Attendance: 38,600 (2,413 per match)

The 2018 FIVB Men's Club World Championship was the 14th edition of the tournament. It was held in Poland for the second straight time from 26 November to 2 December 2018. Eight teams competed in the tournament, including four wild cards.

In an all-Italian final Trentino Volley defeated Cucine Lube Civitanova and won the title for the fifth time. Russia's Fakel Novy Urengoy claimed the bronze medal by defeating Poland's Asseco Resovia in the 3rd place match. Aaron Russell from Trentino Volley was elected the Most Valuable Player.

== Qualification ==
Team (Confederation)	Qualified as
(Poland) PGE Skra Bełchatów (CEV)	Hosts (2018 Polish Champions)
(Russia) Zenit Kazan (CEV)	2018 European Champions
(Brazil) Sada Cruzeiro (CSV)	2018 South American Champions
(Iran) Khatam Ardakan (AVC)*	2018 Asian Champions
(Russia) Fakel Novy Urengoy (CEV)	Wild Card
(Italy) Cucine Lube Civitanova (CEV)	Wild Card
(Poland) Asseco Resovia (CEV)	Wild Card
(Italy) Trentino Volley (CEV)	Wild Card

* Khatam Ardakan replaced Sarmayeh Bank Tehran (2017 Asian Champions), who dissolved in March 2018.

== Pools composition ==
Pool A	Pool B
(Poland) PGE Skra Bełchatów	(Iran) Khatam Ardakan
(Russia) Fakel Novy Urengoy	(Poland) Asseco Resovia
(Italy) Cucine Lube Civitanova	(Brazil) Sada Cruzeiro
(Russia) Zenit Kazan	(Italy) Trentino Volley

== Venues ==
Pool A	Pool B	Final round	Host cities in Poland
Płock, Poland	Rzeszów, Poland	Częstochowa, Poland	Host cities in Poland
Orlen Arena	Hala Podpromie	Hala Sportowa	Host cities in Poland
Capacity: 5,000	Capacity: 7,100	Capacity: 7,000	Host cities in Poland

== Pool standing procedure ==
1. Number of matches won
2. Match points
3. Sets ratio
4. Points ratio
5. If the tie continues as per the points ratio between two teams, the priority will be given to the team which won the last match between them. When the tie in points ratio is between three or more teams, a new classification of these teams in the terms of points 1, 2 and 3 will be made taking into consideration only the matches in which they were opposed to each other.

Match won 3–0 or 3–1: 3 match points for the winner, 0 match points for the loser
Match won 3–2: 2 match points for the winner, 1 match point for the loser

== Preliminary round ==
- All times are Central European Time (UTC+01:00).

=== Pool A ===
Pos	Team	Pld	W	L	Pts	SW	SL	SR	SPW	SPL	SPR	Qualification
1	(Italy) Cucine Lube Civitanova	3	3	0	8	9	3	3.000	287	259	1.108	Semifinals
2	(Russia) Fakel Novy Urengoy	3	2	1	4	6	7	0.857	292	306	0.954	Semifinals
3	(Russia) Zenit Kazan	3	1	2	5	7	7	1.000	318	314	1.013	
4	(Poland) PGE Skra Bełchatów	3	0	3	1	4	9	0.444	303	321	0.944	

Date	Time		Score		Set 1	Set 2	Set 3	Set 4	Set 5	Total	Report
26 Nov	17:30	PGE Skra Bełchatów (Poland)	1–3	(Italy) Cucine Lube Civitanova	21–25	25–22	21–25	25–27		92–99	P2
26 Nov	20:30	Zenit Kazan (Russia)	2–3	(Russia) Fakel Novy Urengoy	23–25	28–26	25–21	22–25	11–15	109–112	P2
27 Nov	17:30	Cucine Lube Civitanova (Italy)	3–2	(Russia) Zenit Kazan	20–25	25–22	24–26	25–23	19–17	113–113	P2
27 Nov	20:50	Fakel Novy Urengoy (Russia)	3–2	(Poland) PGE Skra Bełchatów	23–25	27–29	30–28	25–21	21–19	126–122	P2
29 Nov	17:30	Fakel Novy Urengoy (Russia)	0–3	(Italy) Cucine Lube Civitanova	17–25	18–25	19–25			54–75	P2
29 Nov	20:30	PGE Skra Bełchatów (Poland)	1–3	(Russia) Zenit Kazan	16–25	25–17	27–29	21–25		89–96	P2

=== Pool B ===
Pos	Team	Pld	W	L	Pts	SW	SL	SR	SPW	SPL	SPR	Qualification
1	(Italy) Trentino Volley	3	3	0	9	9	1	9.000	248	219	1.132	Semifinals
2	(Poland) Asseco Resovia	3	2	1	5	6	5	1.200	256	236	1.085	Semifinals
3	(Brazil) Sada Cruzeiro	3	1	2	4	6	6	1.000	283	268	1.056	
4	(Iran) Khatam Ardakan	3	0	3	0	0	9	0.000	163	227	0.718	

Date	Time		Score		Set 1	Set 2	Set 3	Set 4	Set 5	Total	Report
26 Nov	17:30	Trentino Volley (Italy)	3–0	(Iran) Khatam Ardakan	25–19	25–15	25–19			75–53	P2
26 Nov	20:30	Asseco Resovia (Poland)	3–2	(Brazil) Sada Cruzeiro	23–25	25–18	25–23	24–26	17–15	114–107	P2
28 Nov	17:30	Sada Cruzeiro (Brazil)	1–3	(Italy) Trentino Volley	25–17	26–28	23–25	25–27		99–97	P2
28 Nov	20:45	Khatam Ardakan (Iran)	0–3	(Poland) Asseco Resovia	21–25	21–25	11–25			53–75	P2
29 Nov	17:30	Asseco Resovia (Poland)	0–3	(Italy) Trentino Volley	24–26	23–25	20–25			67–76	P2
29 Nov	20:30	Khatam Ardakan (Iran)	0–3	(Brazil) Sada Cruzeiro	16–25	25–27	16–25			57–77	P2

== Final round ==
- All times are Central European Time (UTC+01:00).

Semifinals
1 December
(Italy) Civitanova	3
(Poland) Rzeszów	1
1 December
(Russia) Novy Urengoy	1
(Italy) Trentino	3

Final
2 December
(Italy) Civitanova	1
(Italy) Trentino	3
3rd place match
2 December
(Poland) Asseco Resovia	1
(Russia) Novy Urengoy	3

=== Semifinals ===
Date	Time		Score		Set 1	Set 2	Set 3	Set 4	Set 5	Total	Report
1 Dec	17:30	Cucine Lube Civitanova (Italy)	3–1	(Poland) Asseco Resovia	29–31	25–19	25–14	25–23		104–87	P2
1 Dec	20:40	Fakel Novy Urengoy (Russia)	1–3	(Italy) Trentino Volley	25–22	14–25	16–25	19–25		74–97	P2

=== 3rd place match ===
Date	Time		Score		Set 1	Set 2	Set 3	Set 4	Set 5	Total	Report
2 Dec	17:30	Asseco Resovia (Poland)	1–3	(Russia) Fakel Novy Urengoy	25–19	20–25	23–25	23–25		91–94	P2

=== Final ===
Date	Time		Score		Set 1	Set 2	Set 3	Set 4	Set 5	Total	Report
2 Dec	20:30	Cucine Lube Civitanova (Italy)	1–3	(Italy) Trentino Volley	20–25	25–22	20–25	18–25		83–97	P2

== Final standing ==
Rank	Team
1st place, gold medalist(s)	(Italy) Trentino Volley
2nd place, silver medalist(s)	(Italy) Cucine Lube Civitanova
3rd place, bronze medalist(s)	(Russia) Fakel Novy Urengoy
4	(Poland) Asseco Resovia
5	(Brazil) Sada Cruzeiro
5	(Russia) Zenit Kazan
7	(Iran) Khatam Ardakan
7	(Poland) PGE Skra Bełchatów

2018 Men's Club World Champions

5th title

13–man roster
Aaron Russell, Maarten van Garderen, Gabriele Nelli, Oreste Cavuto, Nicola Daldello, Luca Vettori, Carlo De Angelis, Simone Giannelli (c), Jenia Grebennikov, Davide Candellaro, Uroš Kovačević, Lorenzo Codarin, Srećko Lisinac
Head coach
Angelo Lorenzetti

== Awards ==
- Most valuable player
  (United States) Aaron Russell (Trentino Volley)
- Best setter
  (Italy) Simone Giannelli (Trentino Volley)
- Best outside spikers
  (Serbia) Uroš Kovačević (Trentino Volley)
  (Russia) Dmitry Volkov (Fakel Novy Urengoy)
- Best middle blockers
  (Cuba) Robertlandy Simón (Cucine Lube Civitanova)
  (Serbia) Dragan Stanković (Cucine Lube Civitanova)
- Best opposite spiker
  (Bulgaria) Tsvetan Sokolov (Cucine Lube Civitanova)
- Best libero
  (France) Jenia Grebennikov (Trentino Volley)

== See also ==
- 2018 FIVB Volleyball Women's Club World Championship
