= 2018–19 CEV Champions League =

- League: CEV Champions League
- Sport: Volleyball
- Duration: Qualifying round: 9 October – 13 November 2018; Main tournament: 20 November 2018 – 19 May 2019
- Number of teams: 34 (16 qual. + 18 main tourn.)

Finals
- Venue: (Germany) Berlin
- Champions: (Italy) Cucine Lube Civitanova
- Finals MVP: (Italy) Osmany Juantorena

CEV Champions League seasons
- ← 2017–18 2019–20 →

The 2018–19 CEV Champions League was the 60th edition of the highest level European volleyball club competition organised by the European Volleyball Confederation.

== Qualification ==
Rank	Country	Number of teams			Qualified teams
Rank	Country	Vac	Qual	Total	Qualified teams
1	Italy	3	–	3	Sir Colussi Sicoma Perugia
1	Italy	3	–	3	Cucine Lube Civitanova
1	Italy	3	–	3	Azimut Modena
2	Russia	3	–	3	Zenit Kazan
2	Russia	3	–	3	Zenit Saint Petersburg
2	Russia	3	–	3	Dynamo Moscow
3	Poland	3	–	3	PGE Skra Bełchatów
3	Poland	3	–	3	ZAKSA Kędzierzyn-Koźle
3	Poland	3	–	3	Trefl Gdańsk
4	Turkey	2	–	2	Halkbank Ankara
4	Turkey	2	–	2	Arkas İzmir
5	Germany	2	1	3	Berlin Recycling Volleys
5	Germany	2	1	3	VfB Friedrichshafen
5	Germany	2	1	3	United Volleys Frankfurt
6	Belgium	2	–	2	Greenyard Maaseik
6	Belgium	2	–	2	Knack Roeselare
7	France	1	1	2	Tours VB
7	France	1	1	2	Chaumont VB 52 HM
8	Slovenia	1	–	1	ACH Volley Ljubljana
10	Czech Republic	1	–	1	ČEZ Karlovarsko

== Pools composition ==
Drawing of Lots was held on 25 October 2019 in Budapest.

Pool A	Pool B	Pool C
Zenit Kazan	Cucine Lube Civitanova	Zenit Saint Petersburg
Halkbank Ankara	ZAKSA Kędzierzyn-Koźle	VfB Friedrichshafen
Knack Roeselare	ČEZ Karlovarsko	ACH Volley Ljubljana
United Volleys Frankfurt	Azimut Modena	Chaumont VB 52 HM

Pool D	Pool E
PGE Skra Bełchatów	Sir Colussi Sicoma Perugia
Berlin Recycling Volleys	Arkas İzmir
Greenyard Maaseik	Tours VB
Trefl Gdańsk	Dynamo Moscow

== League round ==
- 20 teams compete in the League round.
- The teams are split into 5 groups, each one featuring four teams.
- The top team in each pool and 3 best 2nd placed teams qualify for the quarterfinals.
- All times are local.

=== Pool A ===
Pos	Team	Pld	W	L	Pts	SW	SL	SR	SPW	SPL	SPR	Qualification
1	(Russia) Zenit Kazan	6	6	0	18	18	4	4.500	540	440	1.227	Quarterfinals
2	(Turkey) Halkbank Ankara	6	3	3	8	10	13	0.769	512	518	0.988	
3	(Belgium) Knack Roeselare	6	2	4	6	11	15	0.733	556	573	0.970	
4	(Germany) United Volleys Frankfurt	6	1	5	4	8	15	0.533	458	535	0.856	

Date	Time		Score		Set 1	Set 2	Set 3	Set 4	Set 5	Total	Report
20 Nov	17:00	Halkbank Ankara (Turkey)	3–2	(Belgium) Knack Roeselare	29–31	25–23	22–25	25–15	15–9	116–103	Report
21 Nov	19:00	Zenit Kazan (Russia)	3–0	(Germany) United Volleys Frankfurt	25–18	25–17	25–13			75–48	Report
18 Dec	19:00	United Volleys Frankfurt (Germany)	3–0	(Turkey) Halkbank Ankara	25–18	25–19	25–23			75–60	Report
20 Dec	20:30	Knack Roeselare (Belgium)	1–3	(Russia) Zenit Kazan	18–25	25–20	23–25	19–25		85–95	Report
15 Jan	19:00	United Volleys Frankfurt (Germany)	2–3	(Belgium) Knack Roeselare	20–25	17–25	25–21	25–21	8–15	95–107	Report
16 Jan	17:00	Halkbank Ankara (Turkey)	1–3	(Russia) Zenit Kazan	15–25	18–25	26–24	22–25		81–99	Report
29 Jan	19:00	Zenit Kazan (Russia)	3–1	(Belgium) Knack Roeselare	20–25	25–18	25–18	25–20		95–81	Report
30 Jan	17:30	Halkbank Ankara (Turkey)	3–1	(Germany) United Volleys Frankfurt	25–12	23–25	25–22	25–21		98–80	Report
14 Feb	19:00	United Volleys Frankfurt (Germany)	1–3	(Russia) Zenit Kazan	19–25	21–25	25–23	18–25		83–98	Report
14 Feb	20:30	Knack Roeselare (Belgium)	1–3	(Turkey) Halkbank Ankara	22–25	25–20	17–25	19–25		83–95	Report
27 Feb	19:00	Zenit Kazan (Russia)	3–0	(Turkey) Halkbank Ankara	25–14	25–22	28–26			78–62	Report
27 Feb	20:30	Knack Roeselare (Belgium)	3–1	(Germany) United Volleys Frankfurt	25–22	25–15	22–25	25–15		97–77	Report

=== Pool B ===
Pos	Team	Pld	W	L	Pts	SW	SL	SR	SPW	SPL	SPR	Qualification
1	(Italy) Cucine Lube Civitanova	6	6	0	17	18	3	6.000	524	435	1.205	Quarterfinals
2	(Poland) ZAKSA Kędzierzyn-Koźle	6	3	3	10	12	10	1.200	511	490	1.043	
3	(Italy) Azimut Modena	6	3	3	9	11	10	1.100	510	495	1.030	
4	(Czech Republic) ČEZ Karlovarsko	6	0	6	0	0	18	0.000	326	451	0.723	

25

Date	Time		Score		Set 1	Set 2	Set 3	Set 4	Set 5	Total	Report
21 Nov	18:00	ZAKSA Kędzierzyn-Koźle (Poland)	3–0	(Czech Republic) ČEZ Karlovarsko	25–16	25–16	25–17			75–49	Report
22 Nov	20:30	Cucine Lube Civitanova (Italy)	3–0	(Italy) Azimut Modena	25–22	30–28	25–22			80–72	Report
19 Dec	18:00	ČEZ Karlovarsko (Czech Republic)	0–3	(Italy) Cucine Lube Civitanova	16–25	18–25	14–25			48–75	Report
19 Dec	20:30	Azimut Modena (Italy)	3–1	(Poland) ZAKSA Kędzierzyn-Koźle	25–23	25–21	22–25	26–24		98–93	Report
15 Jan	20:30	ZAKSA Kędzierzyn-Koźle (Poland)	0–3	(Italy) Cucine Lube Civitanova	19–25	17–25	19–25			55–75	Report
16 Jan	20:30	Azimut Modena (Italy)	3–0	(Czech Republic) ČEZ Karlovarsko	26–24	25–22	25–17			76–63	Report
31 Jan	18:00	ZAKSA Kędzierzyn-Koźle (Poland)	3–1	(Italy) Azimut Modena	22–25	26–24	25–21	25–22		98–92	Report
31 Jan	20:30	Cucine Lube Civitanova (Italy)	3–0	(Czech Republic) ČEZ Karlovarsko	25–16	25–18	25–14			75–48	Report
13 Feb	18:00	ČEZ Karlovarsko (Czech Republic)	0–3	(Poland) ZAKSA Kędzierzyn-Koźle	19–25	23–25	18–25			60–75	Report
13 Feb	20:30	Azimut Modena (Italy)	1–3	(Italy) Cucine Lube Civitanova	27–25	26–28	23–25	21–25		97–103	Report
27 Feb	18:00	ČEZ Karlovarsko (Czech Republic)	0–3	(Italy) Azimut Modena	18–25	21–25	19–25			58–75	Report
27 Feb	20:30	Cucine Lube Civitanova (Italy)	3–2	(Poland) ZAKSA Kędzierzyn-Koźle	20–25	22–25	34–32	25–21	15–12	116–115	Report

=== Pool C ===
Pos	Team	Pld	W	L	Pts	SW	SL	SR	SPW	SPL	SPR	Qualification
1	(Russia) Zenit Saint Petersburg	6	6	0	15	18	6	3.000	546	517	1.056	Quarterfinals
2	(France) Chaumont VB 52 HM	6	4	2	13	16	10	1.600	605	525	1.152	Quarterfinals
3	(Germany) VfB Friedrichshafen	6	2	4	6	8	14	0.571	486	503	0.966	
4	(Slovenia) ACH Volley Ljubljana	6	0	6	2	6	18	0.333	487	579	0.841	

Date	Time		Score		Set 1	Set 2	Set 3	Set 4	Set 5	Total	Report
20 Nov	19:30	Zenit Saint Petersburg (Russia)	3–2	(France) Chaumont VB 52 HM	25–22	20–25	25–22	20–25	16–14	106–108	Report
21 Nov	20:00	VfB Friedrichshafen (Germany)	3–0	(Slovenia) ACH Volley Ljubljana	36–34	25–19	25–15			86–68	Report
18 Dec	18:00	ACH Volley Ljubljana (Slovenia)	2–3	(Russia) Zenit Saint Petersburg	19–25	21–25	25–19	25–21	14–16	104–106	Report
18 Dec	20:30	Chaumont VB 52 HM (France)	3–0	(Germany) VfB Friedrichshafen	25–15	25–23	25–18			75–56	Report
15 Jan	20:30	Chaumont VB 52 HM (France)	3–1	(Slovenia) ACH Volley Ljubljana	25–18	25–13	28–30	28–26		106–87	Report
16 Jan	20:00	VfB Friedrichshafen (Germany)	0–3	(Russia) Zenit Saint Petersburg	17–25	20–25	31–33			68–83	Report
30 Jan	20:00	VfB Friedrichshafen (Germany)	2–3	(France) Chaumont VB 52 HM	19–25	19–25	25–22	25–19	14–16	102–107	Report
31 Jan	19:00	Zenit Saint Petersburg (Russia)	3–0	(Slovenia) ACH Volley Ljubljana	25–19	25–22	25–19			75–60	Report
13 Feb	20:00	Chaumont VB 52 HM (France)	2–3	(Russia) Zenit Saint Petersburg	24–26	25–13	19–25	25–17	18–20	111–101	Report
14 Feb	18:00	ACH Volley Ljubljana (Slovenia)	2–3	(Germany) VfB Friedrichshafen	25–21	22–25	16–25	25–22	7–15	95–108	Report
27 Feb	18:00	ACH Volley Ljubljana (Slovenia)	1–3	(France) Chaumont VB 52 HM	17–25	25–23	15–25	16–25		73–98	Report
27 Feb	19:00	Zenit Saint Petersburg (Russia)	3–0	(Germany) VfB Friedrichshafen	25–22	25–22	25–22			75–66	Report

=== Pool D ===
Pos	Team	Pld	W	L	Pts	SW	SL	SR	SPW	SPL	SPR	Qualification
1	(Poland) Trefl Gdańsk	6	5	1	14	16	6	2.667	545	508	1.073	Quarterfinals
2	(Poland) PGE Skra Bełchatów	6	3	3	11	13	10	1.300	550	539	1.020	Quarterfinals
3	(Belgium) Greenyard Maaseik	6	2	4	6	10	14	0.714	540	551	0.980	
4	(Germany) Berlin Recycling Volleys	6	2	4	5	6	15	0.400	487	524	0.929	

Date	Time		Score		Set 1	Set 2	Set 3	Set 4	Set 5	Total	Report
20 Nov	18:00	PGE Skra Bełchatów (Poland)	3–1	(Poland) Trefl Gdańsk	21–25	35–33	25–19	26–24		107–101	Report
22 Nov	19:30	Berlin Recycling Volleys (Germany)	3–1	(Belgium) Greenyard Maaseik	25–23	25–22	18–25	25–18		93–88	Report
18 Dec	20:30	Greenyard Maaseik (Belgium)	3–0	(Poland) PGE Skra Bełchatów	25–21	25–22	29–27			79–70	Report
19 Dec	18:00	Trefl Gdańsk (Poland)	3–0	(Germany) Berlin Recycling Volleys	26–24	25–19	25–18			76–61	Report
16 Jan	18:00	Trefl Gdańsk (Poland)	3–1	(Belgium) Greenyard Maaseik	22–25	25–22	25–20	25-22		97–67	Report
16 Jan	20:00	Berlin Recycling Volleys (Germany)	0–3	(Poland) PGE Skra Bełchatów	21–25	22–25	23–25			66–75	Report
30 Jan	18:00	PGE Skra Bełchatów (Poland)	2–3	(Belgium) Greenyard Maaseik	16–25	29–27	25–16	21–25	12–15	103–108	Report
30 Jan	20:00	Berlin Recycling Volleys (Germany)	0–3	(Poland) Trefl Gdańsk	20–25	21–25	36–38			77–88	Report
13 Feb	20:30	Greenyard Maaseik (Belgium)	2–3	(Germany) Berlin Recycling Volleys	25–22	25–20	29–31	22–25	13–15	114–113	Report
14 Feb	18:00	Trefl Gdańsk (Poland)	3–2	(Poland) PGE Skra Bełchatów	25–22	28–26	21–25	18–25	16–14	108–112	Report
27 Feb	18:00	PGE Skra Bełchatów (Poland)	3–0	(Germany) Berlin Recycling Volleys	27–25	25–23	31–29			83–77	Report
27 Feb	20:30	Greenyard Maaseik (Belgium)	0–3	(Poland) Trefl Gdańsk	20–25	21–25	21–25			62–75	Report

=== Pool E ===
Pos	Team	Pld	W	L	Pts	SW	SL	SR	SPW	SPL	SPR	Qualification
1	(Italy) Sir Colussi Sicoma Perugia	6	6	0	18	18	4	4.500	539	468	1.152	Quarterfinals
2	(Russia) Dynamo Moscow	6	4	2	12	13	6	2.167	470	432	1.088	Quarterfinals
3	(France) Tours VB	6	2	4	5	7	14	0.500	473	491	0.963	
4	(Turkey) Arkas İzmir	6	0	6	1	4	18	0.222	438	529	0.828	

Date	Time		Score		Set 1	Set 2	Set 3	Set 4	Set 5	Total	Report
21 Nov	19:00	Arkas İzmir (Turkey)	0–3	(France) Tours VB	20–25	23–25	19–25			62–75	Report
21 Nov	20:30	Sir Colussi Sicoma Perugia (Italy)	3–0	(Russia) Dynamo Moscow	25–23	27–25	25–21			77–69	Report
18 Dec	19:00	Dynamo Moscow (Russia)	3–0	(Turkey) Arkas İzmir	25–23	25–20	25–15			75–58	Report
19 Dec	20:00	Tours VB (France)	1–3	(Italy) Sir Colussi Sicoma Perugia	19–25	25–16	19–25	25–27		88–93	Report
15 Jan	19:00	Arkas İzmir (Turkey)	1–3	(Italy) Sir Colussi Sicoma Perugia	10–25	19–25	25–22	23–25		77–97	Report
17 Jan	19:00	Dynamo Moscow (Russia)	3–0	(France) Tours VB	27–25	26–24	26–24			79–73	Report
29 Jan	19:00	Arkas İzmir (Turkey)	0–3	(Russia) Dynamo Moscow	22–25	18–25	16–25			56–75	Report
30 Jan	20:30	Sir Colussi Sicoma Perugia (Italy)	3–0	(France) Tours VB	25–20	25–20	25–19			75–59	Report
12 Feb	20:00	Tours VB (France)	3–2	(Turkey) Arkas İzmir	25–21	25–16	20–25	22–25	15–12	107–99	Report
13 Feb	19:00	Dynamo Moscow (Russia)	1–3	(Italy) Sir Colussi Sicoma Perugia	25–22	21–25	20–25	23–25		89–97	Report
27 Feb	20:00	Tours VB (France)	0–3	(Russia) Dynamo Moscow	23–25	17–25	31–33			71–83	Report
27 Feb	20:30	Sir Colussi Sicoma Perugia (Italy)	3–1	(Turkey) Arkas İzmir	25–21	25–22	25–27	25–16		100–86	Report

=== Second place ranking ===
Pos	Team	Pld	W	L	Pts	SW	SL	SR	SPW	SPL	SPR	Qualification
1	(France) Chaumont VB 52 HM	6	4	2	13	16	10	1.600	605	525	1.152	Quarterfinals
2	(Russia) Dynamo Moscow	6	4	2	12	13	6	2.167	470	432	1.088	Quarterfinals
3	(Poland) PGE Skra Bełchatów	6	3	3	11	13	10	1.300	550	539	1.020	Quarterfinals
4	(Poland) ZAKSA Kędzierzyn-Koźle	6	3	3	10	12	10	1.200	511	490	1.043	
5	(Turkey) Halkbank Ankara	6	3	3	8	10	13	0.769	512	518	0.988	

== Quarterfinals ==
- The winners of the ties qualify for the semifinals.
- In case the teams are tied after two legs, a Golden Set is played immediately at the completion of the second leg.
- All times are local.

Pot 1	Pot 2
Zenit Kazan; Sir Colussi Sicoma Perugia; Cucine Lube Civitanova; Zenit Saint Petersburg	Trefl Gdańsk; Chaumont VB 52 HM; Dynamo Moscow; PGE Skra Bełchatów

Team 1	Agg.	Team 2	1st leg	2nd leg	Golden Set
Chaumont VB 52 HM (France)	1–5	(Italy) Sir Colussi Sicoma Perugia	2–3	0–3	
Trefl Gdańsk (Poland)	3–3	(Russia) Zenit Kazan	2–3	3–2	12–15
PGE Skra Bełchatów (Poland)	3–3	(Russia) Zenit Saint Petersburg	3–1	1–3	15–11
Dynamo Moscow (Russia)	1–5	(Italy) Cucine Lube Civitanova	2–3	0–3	

=== First leg ===
Date	Time		Score		Set 1	Set 2	Set 3	Set 4	Set 5	Total	Report
12 Mar	19:00	Dynamo Moscow (Russia)	2–3	(Italy) Cucine Lube Civitanova	10–25	25–23	25–23	18–25	13–15	91–111	Report
13 Mar	18:00	Trefl Gdańsk (Poland)	2–3	(Russia) Zenit Kazan	19–25	25–23	23–25	25–23	13–15	105–111	Report
14 Mar	18:00	PGE Skra Bełchatów (Poland)	3–1	(Russia) Zenit Saint Petersburg	25–18	13–25	25–22	25–18		88–83	Report
14 Mar	20:30	Chaumont VB 52 HM (France)	2–3	(Italy) Sir Colussi Sicoma Perugia	21–25	31–29	25–17	19–25	14–16	110–112	Report

=== Second leg ===
Date	Time		Score		Set 1	Set 2	Set 3	Set 4	Set 5	Total	Report
19 Mar	19:00	Zenit Kazan (Russia)	2–3	(Poland) Trefl Gdańsk	23–25	23–25	25–23	29–27	15–17	115–117	Report
Golden set		Zenit Kazan (Russia)	15–12	(Poland) Trefl Gdańsk							
20 Mar	19:30	Zenit Saint Petersburg (Russia)	3–1	(Poland) PGE Skra Bełchatów	25–22	21–25	25–20	25–20		96–87	Report
Golden set		Zenit Saint Petersburg (Russia)	11–15	(Poland) PGE Skra Bełchatów							
20 Mar	20:30	Sir Colussi Sicoma Perugia (Italy)	3–0	(France) Chaumont VB 52 HM	25–21	25–16	25–17			75–54	Report
21 Mar	20:30	Cucine Lube Civitanova (Italy)	3–0	(Russia) Dynamo Moscow	25–16	25–21	25–21			75–58	Report

== Semifinals ==
- The winners of the ties qualify for the final.
- In case the teams are tied after two legs, a Golden Set is played immediately at the completion of the second leg.
- All times are local.

Team 1	Agg.	Team 2	1st leg	2nd leg
Sir Colussi Sicoma Perugia (Italy)	1–5	(Russia) Zenit Kazan	2–3	1–3
PGE Skra Bełchatów (Poland)	0–6	(Italy) Cucine Lube Civitanova	0–3	0–3

=== First leg ===
Date	Time		Score		Set 1	Set 2	Set 3	Set 4	Set 5	Total	Report
3 Apr	20:30	Sir Colussi Sicoma Perugia (Italy)	2–3	(Russia) Zenit Kazan	22–25	26–24	25–27	25–20	13–15	111–111	Report
3 Apr	18:00	PGE Skra Bełchatów (Poland)	0–3	(Italy) Cucine Lube Civitanova	14–25	20–25	23–25			57–75	Report

=== Second leg ===
Date	Time		Score		Set 1	Set 2	Set 3	Set 4	Set 5	Total	Report
10 Apr	19:00	Zenit Kazan (Russia)	3–1	(Italy) Sir Colussi Sicoma Perugia	22–25	25–23	25–23	26–24		98–95	Report
10 Apr	20:30	Cucine Lube Civitanova (Italy)	3–0	(Poland) PGE Skra Bełchatów	25–15	25–20	27–25			77–60	Report

== Final ==
- Place: Berlin
- Time: Central European Summer Time (UTC+02:00).

Date	Time		Score		Set 1	Set 2	Set 3	Set 4	Set 5	Total	Report
18 May	19:00	Zenit Kazan (Russia)	1–3	(Italy) Cucine Lube Civitanova	25–16	15–25	12–25	19–25		71–91	Report

== Final standings ==
Qualified for the 2019 FIVB Club World Championship

Rank	Team
1st place, gold medalist(s)	(Italy) Cucine Lube Civitanova
2nd place, silver medalist(s)	(Russia) Zenit Kazan
Semifinalists	(Poland) PGE Skra Bełchatów (Italy) Sir Colussi Sicoma Perugia

2018–19 CEV Champions League winners
(Italy)
Cucine Lube Civitanova
2nd title
