= 2018 FIVB Volleyball Men's Club World Championship squads =

This article shows the rosters of all participating teams at the 2018 FIVB Volleyball Men's Club World Championship in Poland.

== Pool A ==
=== PGE Skra Bełchatów ===
The following is the roster of the Polish club PGE Skra Bełchatów in the 2018 FIVB Volleyball Men's Club World Championship.

- Head coach: (Italy) Roberto Piazza

No.	Name	Date of birth	Height	Weight	Spike	Block
1	(Poland) Kamil Droszyński	28 January 1997	1.90 m (6 ft 3 in)	86 kg (190 lb)	335 cm (132 in)	310 cm (120 in)
2	(Poland) Mariusz Wlazły (C)	4 August 1983	1.94 m (6 ft 4 in)	80 kg (180 lb)	360 cm (140 in)	329 cm (130 in)
3	(Estonia) Renee Teppan	26 September 1993	1.97 m (6 ft 6 in)	89 kg (196 lb)	352 cm (139 in)	337 cm (133 in)
6	(Poland) Karol Kłos	8 August 1989	2.01 m (6 ft 7 in)	87 kg (192 lb)	357 cm (141 in)	326 cm (128 in)
7	(Poland) Jakub Kochanowski	17 July 1997	1.99 m (6 ft 6 in)	89 kg (196 lb)	353 cm (139 in)	323 cm (127 in)
8	(Serbia) Milan Katić	22 October 1993	2.02 m (6 ft 8 in)	99 kg (218 lb)	345 cm (136 in)	331 cm (130 in)
10	(Poland) Robert Milczarek (L)	28 November 1983	1.88 m (6 ft 2 in)	78 kg (172 lb)	340 cm (130 in)	320 cm (130 in)
11	(Iran) Milad Ebadipour	17 October 1993	1.96 m (6 ft 5 in)	78 kg (172 lb)	350 cm (140 in)	310 cm (120 in)
12	(Poland) Artur Szalpuk	20 March 1995	2.01 m (6 ft 7 in)	93 kg (205 lb)	350 cm (140 in)	335 cm (132 in)
14	(Cuba) David Fiel Rodríguez	28 August 1993	2.05 m (6 ft 9 in)	98 kg (216 lb)	374 cm (147 in)	369 cm (145 in)
15	(Poland) Grzegorz Łomacz	1 October 1987	1.87 m (6 ft 2 in)	80 kg (180 lb)	335 cm (132 in)	315 cm (124 in)
16	(Poland) Kacper Piechocki (L)	17 December 1995	1.84 m (6 ft 0 in)	74 kg (163 lb)	316 cm (124 in)	305 cm (120 in)
17	(Poland) Piotr Orczyk	19 March 1993	1.98 m (6 ft 6 in)	88 kg (194 lb)	355 cm (140 in)	332 cm (131 in)

=== Fakel Novy Urengoy ===
The following is the roster of the Russian club Fakel Novy Urengoy in the 2018 FIVB Volleyball Men's Club World Championship.

- Head coach: (Italy) Camillo Placì

No.	Name	Date of birth	Height	Weight	Spike	Block
4	(Russia) Dmitrii Kolenkovskii	15 January 1995	2.06 m (6 ft 9 in)	102 kg (225 lb)	357 cm (141 in)	341 cm (134 in)
5	(Russia) Andrey Ananiev	21 June 1992	2.05 m (6 ft 9 in)	96 kg (212 lb)	340 cm (130 in)	330 cm (130 in)
6	(Russia) Denis Getman	27 February 1994	2.00 m (6 ft 7 in)	90 kg (200 lb)	355 cm (140 in)	315 cm (124 in)
7	(Russia) Igor Kolodinsky (C)	7 July 1983	1.97 m (6 ft 6 in)	92 kg (203 lb)	340 cm (130 in)	325 cm (128 in)
8	(Belarus) Artur Udrys	18 October 1990	2.12 m (6 ft 11 in)	99 kg (218 lb)	382 cm (150 in)	366 cm (144 in)
9	(Russia) Ivan Iakovlev	17 April 1995	2.07 m (6 ft 9 in)	89 kg (196 lb)	360 cm (140 in)	350 cm (140 in)
10	(Russia) Denis Bogdan	13 October 1996	2.00 m (6 ft 7 in)	92 kg (203 lb)	350 cm (140 in)	340 cm (130 in)
12	(Russia) Evgenii Rukavishnikov	3 June 1991	1.99 m (6 ft 6 in)	92 kg (203 lb)	342 cm (135 in)	321 cm (126 in)
14	(United States) Erik Shoji (L)	24 August 1989	1.84 m (6 ft 0 in)	83 kg (183 lb)	330 cm (130 in)	321 cm (126 in)
15	(Russia) Dmitry Volkov	25 May 1995	2.01 m (6 ft 7 in)	88 kg (194 lb)	340 cm (130 in)	330 cm (130 in)
16	(Russia) Ilya Petrushov (L)	9 August 1994	1.82 m (6 ft 0 in)	75 kg (165 lb)	310 cm (120 in)	300 cm (120 in)
17	(Russia) Denis Shenkel	18 September 1995	1.96 m (6 ft 5 in)	80 kg (180 lb)	350 cm (140 in)	332 cm (131 in)
18	(Russia) Egor Kliuka	15 June 1995	2.09 m (6 ft 10 in)	93 kg (205 lb)	360 cm (140 in)	350 cm (140 in)
19	(Russia) Alexander Kimerov	11 September 1996	2.15 m (7 ft 1 in)	103 kg (227 lb)	355 cm (140 in)	335 cm (132 in)

=== Cucine Lube Civitanova ===
The following is the roster of the Italian club Cucine Lube Civitanova in the 2018 FIVB Volleyball Men's Club World Championship.

- Head coach: (Italy) Giampaolo Medei

No.	Name	Date of birth	Height	Weight	Spike	Block
1	(Bulgaria) Tsvetan Sokolov	31 December 1989	2.06 m (6 ft 9 in)	100 kg (220 lb)	370 cm (150 in)	350 cm (140 in)
3	(Belgium) Stijn D'Hulst	24 April 1991	1.87 m (6 ft 2 in)	75 kg (165 lb)	321 cm (126 in)	305 cm (120 in)
4	(Italy) Andrea Marchisio (L)	6 November 1990	1.82 m (6 ft 0 in)	86 kg (190 lb)	315 cm (124 in)	305 cm (120 in)
5	(Italy) Osmany Juantorena	12 August 1985	2.00 m (6 ft 7 in)	85 kg (187 lb)	370 cm (150 in)	340 cm (130 in)
6	(Italy) Jacopo Massari	2 June 1988	1.85 m (6 ft 1 in)	79 kg (174 lb)	352 cm (139 in)	310 cm (120 in)
7	(Serbia) Dragan Stanković (C)	18 October 1985	2.05 m (6 ft 9 in)	94 kg (207 lb)	355 cm (140 in)	330 cm (130 in)
8	(Italy) Enrico Diamantini	4 April 1993	2.04 m (6 ft 8 in)	90 kg (200 lb)	340 cm (130 in)	260 cm (100 in)
9	(Brazil) Yoandy Leal	31 August 1988	2.02 m (6 ft 8 in)	107 kg (236 lb)	361 cm (142 in)	348 cm (137 in)
10	(United States) Brenden Sander	22 December 1995	1.93 m (6 ft 4 in)	78 kg (172 lb)	358 cm (141 in)	337 cm (133 in)
11	(Italy) Diego Cantagalli	13 February 1999	2.01 m (6 ft 7 in)	89 kg (196 lb)	348 cm (137 in)	310 cm (120 in)
12	(Italy) Enrico Cester	16 March 1988	2.02 m (6 ft 8 in)	93 kg (205 lb)	336 cm (132 in)	321 cm (126 in)
13	(Cuba) Robertlandy Simón	11 June 1987	2.08 m (6 ft 10 in)	114 kg (251 lb)	358 cm (141 in)	326 cm (128 in)
14	(Brazil) Bruno Rezende	2 July 1986	1.90 m (6 ft 3 in)	76 kg (168 lb)	323 cm (127 in)	302 cm (119 in)
17	(Italy) Fabio Balaso (L)	20 October 1995	1.78 m (5 ft 10 in)	73 kg (161 lb)	305 cm (120 in)	280 cm (110 in)

=== Zenit Kazan ===
The following is the roster of the Russian club Zenit Kazan in the 2018 FIVB Volleyball Men's Club World Championship.

- Head coach: (Russia) Vladimir Alekno

No.	Name	Date of birth	Height	Weight	Spike	Block
1	(United States) Matt Anderson	18 April 1987	2.02 m (6 ft 8 in)	100 kg (220 lb)	360 cm (140 in)	332 cm (131 in)
3	(Russia) Andrey Surmachevskiy	22 June 1996	1.95 m (6 ft 5 in)	85 kg (187 lb)	335 cm (132 in)	325 cm (128 in)
4	(Russia) Artem Volvich	22 January 1990	2.08 m (6 ft 10 in)	96 kg (212 lb)	350 cm (140 in)	330 cm (130 in)
5	(Russia) Loran Alekno	18 September 1996	1.96 m (6 ft 5 in)	90 kg (200 lb)	330 cm (130 in)	320 cm (130 in)
7	(Russia) Vadym Likhosherstov	23 January 1989	2.15 m (7 ft 1 in)	104 kg (229 lb)	356 cm (140 in)	336 cm (132 in)
8	(Russia) Nikita Alekseev	15 July 1992	2.06 m (6 ft 9 in)	102 kg (225 lb)	340 cm (130 in)	330 cm (130 in)
9	(France) Earvin N'Gapeth	12 February 1991	1.94 m (6 ft 4 in)	101 kg (223 lb)	358 cm (141 in)	327 cm (129 in)
10	(Russia) Aleksei Kononov	9 April 1997	2.05 m (6 ft 9 in)	93 kg (205 lb)	350 cm (140 in)	340 cm (130 in)
11	(Russia) Valentin Krotkov (L)	1 September 1991	1.95 m (6 ft 5 in)	84 kg (185 lb)	340 cm (130 in)	330 cm (130 in)
12	(Russia) Aleksandr Butko (C)	18 March 1986	1.98 m (6 ft 6 in)	97 kg (214 lb)	339 cm (133 in)	327 cm (129 in)
13	(Russia) Alexey Samoylenko	23 June 1985	2.07 m (6 ft 9 in)	98 kg (216 lb)	360 cm (140 in)	330 cm (130 in)
15	(Russia) Alexey Spiridonov	26 June 1988	1.96 m (6 ft 5 in)	96 kg (212 lb)	347 cm (137 in)	328 cm (129 in)
16	(Russia) Aleksey Verbov (L)	31 January 1982	1.86 m (6 ft 1 in)	79 kg (174 lb)	250 cm (98 in)	250 cm (98 in)
18	(Russia) Maxim Mikhaylov	19 March 1988	2.02 m (6 ft 8 in)	103 kg (227 lb)	345 cm (136 in)	330 cm (130 in)

== Pool B ==
=== Khatam Ardakan ===
The following is the roster of the Iranian club Khatam Ardakan in the 2018 FIVB Volleyball Men's Club World Championship.

- Head coach: (Iran) Mohammad Reza Salek

No.	Name	Date of birth	Height	Weight	Spike	Block
3	(Iran) Mohammad Hassan Senobar	11 July 1989	2.10 m (6 ft 11 in)	94 kg (207 lb)	370 cm (150 in)	361 cm (142 in)
4	(Iran) Akbar Velaei	2 September 1997	1.90 m (6 ft 3 in)	90 kg (200 lb)	340 cm (130 in)	320 cm (130 in)
6	(Iran) Mohammad Bagheri	2 December 1983	1.90 m (6 ft 3 in)	88 kg (194 lb)	310 cm (120 in)	300 cm (120 in)
7	(Iran) Ramin Khani	27 November 1992	1.94 m (6 ft 4 in)	86 kg (190 lb)	330 cm (130 in)	320 cm (130 in)
9	(Iran) Adel Gholami	9 February 1986	1.95 m (6 ft 5 in)	88 kg (194 lb)	341 cm (134 in)	330 cm (130 in)
10	(Iran) Ghasem Karkhaneh	22 August 1994	1.95 m (6 ft 5 in)	80 kg (180 lb)	338 cm (133 in)	335 cm (132 in)
12	(Iran) Farhad Nazari Afshar (L)	22 May 1984	1.95 m (6 ft 5 in)	95 kg (209 lb)	320 cm (130 in)	315 cm (124 in)
13	(Iran) Bahman Jahandideh (C)	5 March 1988	1.94 m (6 ft 4 in)	90 kg (200 lb)	289 cm (114 in)	268 cm (106 in)
14	(Iran) Ali Tabari	20 August 1999	1.96 m (6 ft 5 in)	80 kg (180 lb)	330 cm (130 in)	310 cm (120 in)
18	(Iran) Mohammad Taher Vadi	10 October 1989	1.94 m (6 ft 4 in)	72 kg (159 lb)	329 cm (130 in)	315 cm (124 in)
20	(Iran) Tayeb Eini	30 May 1997	2.05 m (6 ft 9 in)	93 kg (205 lb)	330 cm (130 in)	300 cm (120 in)

=== Asseco Resovia Rzeszów ===
The following is the roster of the Polish club Asseco Resovia Rzeszów in the 2018 FIVB Volleyball Men's Club World Championship.

- Head coach: (Romania) Gheorghe Crețu

No.	Name	Date of birth	Height	Weight	Spike	Block
2	(United States) Kawika Shoji	11 November 1987	1.90 m (6 ft 3 in)	79 kg (174 lb)	331 cm (130 in)	315 cm (124 in)
3	(Poland) Bartłomiej Lemański	19 March 1996	2.17 m (7 ft 1 in)	103 kg (227 lb)	360 cm (140 in)	345 cm (136 in)
4	(Australia) Luke Perry (L)	20 November 1995	1.80 m (5 ft 11 in)	75 kg (165 lb)	331 cm (130 in)	315 cm (124 in)
5	(France) Rafael Redwitz	12 August 1980	1.90 m (6 ft 3 in)	85 kg (187 lb)	330 cm (130 in)	312 cm (123 in)
7	(Poland) Jakub Jarosz	10 February 1987	1.95 m (6 ft 5 in)	84 kg (185 lb)	353 cm (139 in)	328 cm (129 in)
8	(Poland) Damian Schulz	26 February 1990	2.08 m (6 ft 10 in)	95 kg (209 lb)	355 cm (140 in)	330 cm (130 in)
9	(France) Thibault Rossard	28 August 1993	1.94 m (6 ft 4 in)	85 kg (187 lb)	350 cm (140 in)	320 cm (130 in)
10	(France) Nicolas Szerszen	31 December 1996	1.92 m (6 ft 4 in)	81 kg (179 lb)	325 cm (128 in)	305 cm (120 in)
14	(Poland) Rafał Buszek	28 April 1987	1.94 m (6 ft 4 in)	81 kg (179 lb)	345 cm (136 in)	327 cm (129 in)
15	(Poland) Mateusz Mika	21 January 1991	2.06 m (6 ft 9 in)	86 kg (190 lb)	352 cm (139 in)	320 cm (130 in)
16	(Poland) Maciej Czyrek (L)	17 December 2000	1.83 m (6 ft 0 in)	75 kg (165 lb)	330 cm (130 in)	315 cm (124 in)
17	(Poland) Marcin Możdżonek (C)	9 February 1985	2.11 m (6 ft 11 in)	93 kg (205 lb)	358 cm (141 in)	338 cm (133 in)
18	(Poland) Dawid Dryja	21 July 1992	2.01 m (6 ft 7 in)	91 kg (201 lb)	345 cm (136 in)	312 cm (123 in)
20	(United States) David Smith	15 May 1985	2.01 m (6 ft 7 in)	86 kg (190 lb)	348 cm (137 in)	314 cm (124 in)

=== Sada Cruzeiro ===
The following is the roster of the Brazilian club Sada Cruzeiro in the 2018 FIVB Volleyball Men's Club World Championship.

- Head coach: (Argentina) Marcelo Méndez

No.	Name	Date of birth	Height	Weight	Spike	Block
1	(Brazil) Luan Weber	12 February 1991	2.00 m (6 ft 7 in)	85 kg (187 lb)	339 cm (133 in)	315 cm (124 in)
3	(Brazil) Éder Levy Kock	4 July 1993	2.07 m (6 ft 9 in)	99 kg (218 lb)	335 cm (132 in)	315 cm (124 in)
4	(Brazil) Leonardo Nascimento	16 March 1995	1.99 m (6 ft 6 in)	87 kg (192 lb)	338 cm (133 in)	316 cm (124 in)
5	(Brazil) Sandro Carvalho	4 February 1981	1.87 m (6 ft 2 in)	82 kg (181 lb)	300 cm (120 in)	285 cm (112 in)
6	(Brazil) Robert Araújo	10 March 1996	2.03 m (6 ft 8 in)	97 kg (214 lb)	359 cm (141 in)	325 cm (128 in)
8	(Brazil) Evandro Guerra	27 December 1981	2.07 m (6 ft 9 in)	106 kg (234 lb)	359 cm (141 in)	332 cm (131 in)
10	(France) Kévin Le Roux	11 May 1989	2.09 m (6 ft 10 in)	95 kg (209 lb)	365 cm (144 in)	345 cm (136 in)
11	(Brazil) Rodrigo Leão	5 June 1996	1.97 m (6 ft 6 in)	85 kg (187 lb)	331 cm (130 in)	316 cm (124 in)
12	(Brazil) Isac Santos	13 December 1990	2.08 m (6 ft 10 in)	99 kg (218 lb)	339 cm (133 in)	306 cm (120 in)
14	(Brazil) Fernando Kreling	13 January 1996	1.85 m (6 ft 1 in)	85 kg (187 lb)	319 cm (126 in)	301 cm (119 in)
15	(United States) Taylor Sander	17 March 1992	1.96 m (6 ft 5 in)	80 kg (180 lb)	345 cm (136 in)	320 cm (130 in)
16	(Brazil) Lucas Bauer (L)	20 October 1999	1.92 m (6 ft 4 in)	86 kg (190 lb)	325 cm (128 in)	309 cm (122 in)
17	(Brazil) Sérgio Nogueira	25 August 1978	1.84 m (6 ft 0 in)	79 kg (174 lb)	322 cm (127 in)	319 cm (126 in)
18	(Brazil) Filipe Ferraz (C)	1 March 1980	1.94 m (6 ft 4 in)	90 kg (200 lb)	335 cm (132 in)	305 cm (120 in)

=== Trentino Volley ===
The following is the roster of the Italian club Trentino Volley in the 2018 FIVB Volleyball Men's Club World Championship.

- Head coach: (Italy) Angelo Lorenzetti

No.	Name	Date of birth	Height	Weight	Spike	Block
2	(United States) Aaron Russell	4 June 1993	2.05 m (6 ft 9 in)	98 kg (216 lb)	356 cm (140 in)	337 cm (133 in)
3	(Netherlands) Maarten van Garderen	24 January 1990	2.00 m (6 ft 7 in)	89 kg (196 lb)	359 cm (141 in)	338 cm (133 in)
4	(Italy) Gabriele Nelli	4 December 1993	2.10 m (6 ft 11 in)	100 kg (220 lb)	355 cm (140 in)	320 cm (130 in)
5	(Italy) Oreste Cavuto	5 December 1996	1.96 m (6 ft 5 in)	87 kg (192 lb)	353 cm (139 in)	344 cm (135 in)
6	(Italy) Nicola Daldello	6 May 1983	1.80 m (5 ft 11 in)	75 kg (165 lb)	330 cm (130 in)	315 cm (124 in)
7	(Italy) Luca Vettori	26 April 1991	2.00 m (6 ft 7 in)	95 kg (209 lb)	345 cm (136 in)	323 cm (127 in)
8	(Italy) Carlo De Angelis (L)	10 January 1996	1.88 m (6 ft 2 in)	81 kg (179 lb)	330 cm (130 in)	315 cm (124 in)
9	(Italy) Simone Giannelli (C)	9 August 1996	1.98 m (6 ft 6 in)	92 kg (203 lb)	350 cm (140 in)	330 cm (130 in)
10	(France) Jenia Grebennikov (L)	13 August 1990	1.88 m (6 ft 2 in)	85 kg (187 lb)	345 cm (136 in)	330 cm (130 in)
11	(Italy) Davide Candellaro	7 June 1989	2.00 m (6 ft 7 in)	88 kg (194 lb)	340 cm (130 in)	320 cm (130 in)
12	(Serbia) Uroš Kovačević	6 May 1993	1.97 m (6 ft 6 in)	90 kg (200 lb)	340 cm (130 in)	320 cm (130 in)
15	(Italy) Lorenzo Codarin	3 September 1996	2.00 m (6 ft 7 in)	90 kg (200 lb)	360 cm (140 in)	340 cm (130 in)
20	(Serbia) Srećko Lisinac	17 May 1992	2.05 m (6 ft 9 in)	90 kg (200 lb)	355 cm (140 in)	342 cm (135 in)
