= Alexander Gutsalyuk =

Russian volleyball player (born 1988)

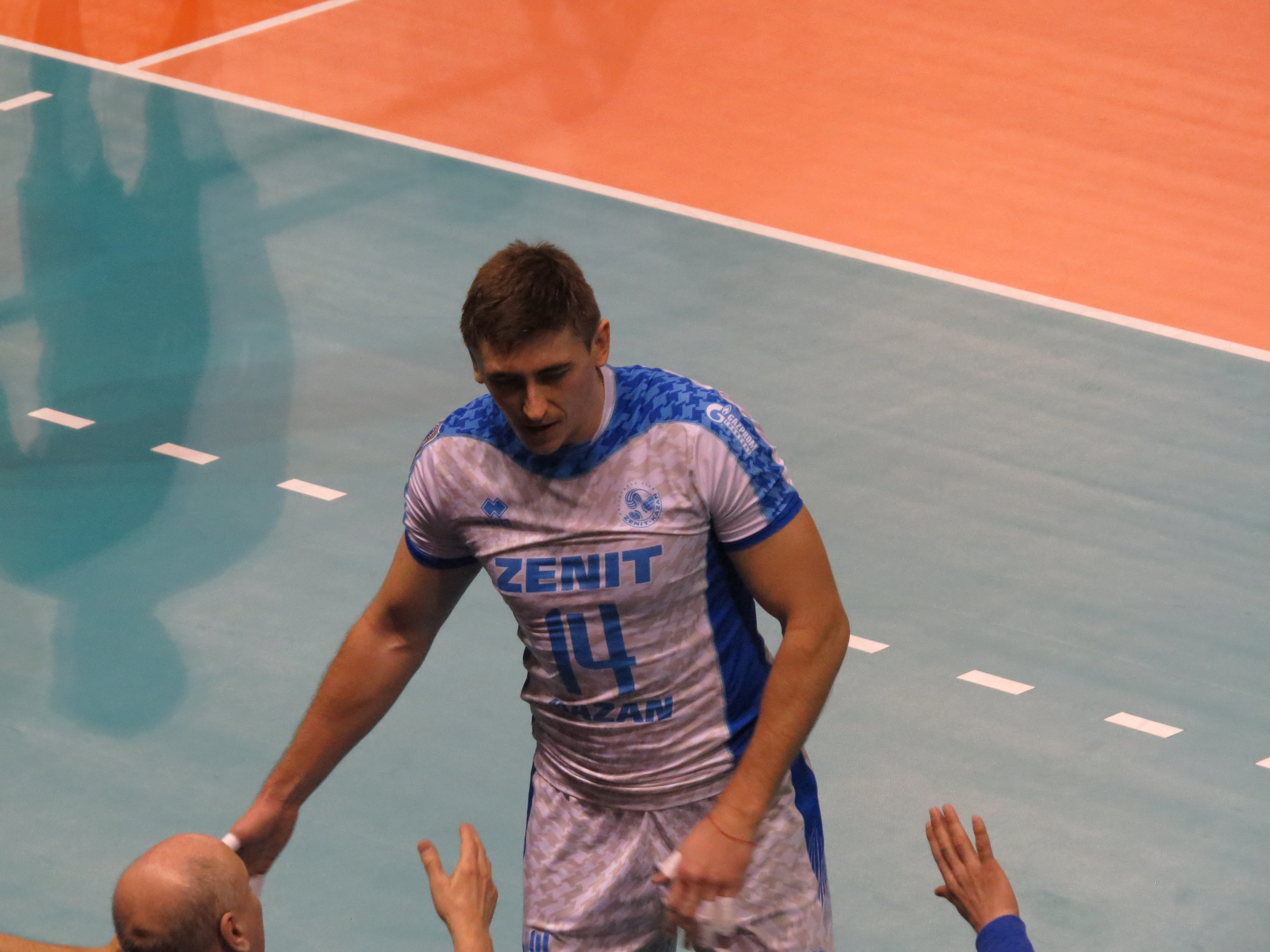

Personal information
- Full name: Alexander Alexandrovich Gutsalyuk
- Nationality: Russian
- Born: 15 January 1988 (age 38); Krasnodar, Russia, USSR
- Height: 2.05 m (6 ft 9 in)
- Weight: 105 kg (231 lb)
- Spike: 362 cm (143 in)
- Block: 345 cm (136 in)

Volleyball information
- Position: Middle blocker
- Current club: Ural Ufa
- Number: 8

Career
Years	Teams
2005–2009; 2009–2011; 2011–2012; 2012–2013; 2013–2014; 2014–2018; 2018-2019; 2019-2021; 2021-	Dinamo Krasnodar; Gazprom-Ugra Surgut; Zenit Kazan; Lokomotiv Novosibirsk; Fakel Novy Urengoy; Zenit Kazan; Belogorie Belgorod; Fakel Novy Urengoy; Ural Ufa
- Last updated: 5 October 2021

Alexander Alexandrovich Gutsalyuk (Russian: Александр Александрович Гуцалюк; born 15 January 1988) is a Russian male volleyball player. With his club Zenit Kazan he competed at the 2011 FIVB Volleyball Men's Club World Championship.

== Sporting achievements ==
=== Clubs ===
==== CEV Champions League ====
- 2011/2012 - with Zenit Kazan
- 2012/2013 - with Lokomotiv Novosibirsk
- 2014/2015 - with Zenit Kazan
- 2015/2016 - with Zenit Kazan
- 2016/2017 - with Zenit Kazan

==== FIVB Club World Championship ====
- 2011 Qatar - with Zenit Kazan
- 2015 Brazil - with Zenit Kazan
- 2016 Brazil - with Zenit Kazan
- 2017 Poland - with Zenit Kazan

==== National championships ====
- 2011/2012 Russian SuperCup 2011, with Zenit Kazan
- 2011/2012 Russian Championship, with Zenit Kazan
- 2013/2014 Russian Cup, with Zenit Kazan
- 2014/2015 Russian Cup, with Zenit Kazan
- 2014/2015 Russian Championship, with Zenit Kazan
- 2015/2016 Russian SuperCup 2015, with Zenit Kazan
- 2015/2016 Russian Cup, with Zenit Kazan
- 2015/2016 Russian Championship, with Zenit Kazan
- 2016/2017 Russian SuperCup 2016, with Zenit Kazan
- 2016/2017 Russian Cup, with Zenit Kazan
- 2016/2017 Russian Championship, with Zenit Kazan
- 2017/2018 Russian SuperCup 2017, with Zenit Kazan
