= Aleksey Spiridonov =

Aleksey Spiridonov may refer to:

- Aleksey Spiridonov (athlete)
- Aleksey Spiridonov (volleyball)
