= Butko =

Butko (Ukrainian: Бутко Russian: Бутько) is a Ukrainian surname and Russian surname. Notable people with the surname include:

- Aleksandr Butko
- Bohdan Butko (born 1991), Ukrainian footballer
- Oleksandr Butko (born 1957), Ukrainian journalist, editor, and television manager
