= 2017 FIVB Volleyball Men's Club World Championship =

2017 Men's Club World Championship
Tournament details
- Host country: Poland
- Dates: 12–17 December
- Teams: 8 (from 3 confederations)
- Venues: 3 (in 3 host cities)

Final positions
- Champions: (Russia) Zenit Kazan (1st title)

Tournament awards
- MVP: (Italy) Osmany Juantorena (LUB)

Tournament statistics
- Matches played: 16
- Attendance: 53,110 (3,319 per match)

The 2017 FIVB Men's Club World Championship was the 13th edition of the tournament. It was held in Poland for the first time from 12 to 17 December 2017. Eight teams competed in the tournament, including two wild cards.

Russia's Zenit Kazan defeated Italy's Cucine Lube Civitanova in the final and won the title for the first time. Brazil's Sada Cruzeiro claimed the bronze medal by defeating Poland's PGE Skra Bełchatów in the 3rd place match. Osmany Juantorena from Cucine Lube Civitanova was elected the Most Valuable Player.

== Qualification ==
Team (Confederation)	Qualified as
(Poland) ZAKSA Kędzierzyn-Koźle (CEV)	Hosts (2017 Polish Champions)
(Iran) Sarmayeh Bank Tehran (AVC)	2016 Asian Champions
(Brazil) Sada Cruzeiro (CSV)	2017 South American Champions
(Russia) Zenit Kazan (CEV)	2017 European Champions
(Italy) Cucine Lube Civitanova (CEV)	2017 National Champions from the top 2 countries, not yet qualified, in the FIVB World Ranking as of 31 December 2016
(Argentina) Personal Bolívar (CSV)	2017 National Champions from the top 2 countries, not yet qualified, in the FIVB World Ranking as of 31 December 2016
(Poland) PGE Skra Bełchatów (CEV)	Wild Card
(China) Shanghai Golden Age (AVC)	Wild Card

== Pools composition ==
Pool A	Pool B
(Poland) ZAKSA Kędzierzyn-Koźle	(Poland) PGE Skra Bełchatów
(Italy) Cucine Lube Civitanova	(Russia) Zenit Kazan
(Brazil) Sada Cruzeiro	(Argentina) Personal Bolívar
(Iran) Sarmayeh Bank Tehran	(China) Shanghai Golden Age

== Venues ==
Pool A	Pool B	Final round	Host cities in Poland
Opole, Poland	Łódź, Poland	Kraków, Poland	Host cities in Poland
Stegu Arena	Atlas Arena	Tauron Arena Kraków	Host cities in Poland
Capacity: 3,500	Capacity: 12,100	Capacity: 14,752	Host cities in Poland

== Pool standing procedure ==
1. Number of matches won
2. Match points
3. Sets ratio
4. Points ratio
5. If the tie continues as per the points ratio between two teams, the priority will be given to the team which won the last match between them. When the tie in points ratio is between three or more teams, a new classification of these teams in the terms of points 1, 2 and 3 will be made taking into consideration only the matches in which they were opposed to each other.

Match won 3–0 or 3–1: 3 match points for the winner, 0 match points for the loser
Match won 3–2: 2 match points for the winner, 1 match point for the loser

== Preliminary round ==
- All times are Central European Time (UTC+01:00).

=== Pool A ===
Pos	Team	Pld	W	L	Pts	SW	SL	SR	SPW	SPL	SPR	Qualification
1	(Italy) Cucine Lube Civitanova	3	3	0	8	9	2	4.500	265	227	1.167	Semifinals
2	(Brazil) Sada Cruzeiro	3	2	1	6	6	3	2.000	212	203	1.044	Semifinals
3	(Poland) ZAKSA Kędzierzyn-Koźle	3	1	2	3	5	8	0.625	283	306	0.925	
4	(Iran) Sarmayeh Bank Tehran	3	0	3	1	2	9	0.222	239	263	0.909	

Date	Time		Score		Set 1	Set 2	Set 3	Set 4	Set 5	Total	Report
12 Dec	17:30	ZAKSA Kędzierzyn-Koźle (Poland)	3–2	(Iran) Sarmayeh Bank Tehran	19–25	20–25	25–16	31–29	17–15	112–110	P2 P3
12 Dec	20:50	Sada Cruzeiro (Brazil)	0–3	(Italy) Cucine Lube Civitanova	21–25	16–25	18–25			55–75	P2 P3
13 Dec	17:30	ZAKSA Kędzierzyn-Koźle (Poland)	2–3	(Italy) Cucine Lube Civitanova	25–23	21–25	25–23	21–25	16–18	108–114	P2 P3
13 Dec	20:50	Sarmayeh Bank Tehran (Iran)	0–3	(Brazil) Sada Cruzeiro	23–25	20–25	22–25			65–75	P2 P3
14 Dec	17:30	ZAKSA Kędzierzyn-Koźle (Poland)	0–3	(Brazil) Sada Cruzeiro	13–25	30–32	20–25			63–82	P2 P3
14 Dec	20:30	Cucine Lube Civitanova (Italy)	3–0	(Iran) Sarmayeh Bank Tehran	26–24	25–17	25–23			76–64	P2 P3

=== Pool B ===
Pos	Team	Pld	W	L	Pts	SW	SL	SR	SPW	SPL	SPR	Qualification
1	(Russia) Zenit Kazan	3	3	0	9	9	0	MAX	229	171	1.339	Semifinals
2	(Poland) PGE Skra Bełchatów	3	2	1	6	6	4	1.500	236	217	1.088	Semifinals
3	(China) Shanghai Golden Age	3	1	2	2	3	8	0.375	220	251	0.876	
4	(Argentina) Personal Bolívar	3	0	3	1	3	9	0.333	237	283	0.837	

Date	Time		Score		Set 1	Set 2	Set 3	Set 4	Set 5	Total	Report
12 Dec	17:30	Zenit Kazan (Russia)	3–0	(Argentina) Personal Bolívar	25–20	25–19	25–17			75–56	P2 P3
12 Dec	20:30	PGE Skra Bełchatów (Poland)	3–0	(China) Shanghai Golden Age	25–18	25–19	25–21			75–58	P2 P3
13 Dec	17:30	Zenit Kazan (Russia)	3–0	(China) Shanghai Golden Age	25–15	25–16	25–21			75–52	P2 P3
13 Dec	20:30	PGE Skra Bełchatów (Poland)	3–1	(Argentina) Personal Bolívar	23–25	25–15	25–21	25–19		98–80	P2 P3
14 Dec	17:30	Shanghai Golden Age (China)	3–2	(Argentina) Personal Bolívar	22–25	25–20	23–25	25–18	15–13	110–101	P2 P3
14 Dec	20:30	PGE Skra Bełchatów (Poland)	0–3	(Russia) Zenit Kazan	27–29	20–25	16–25			63–79	P2 P3

== Final round ==
- All times are Central European Time (UTC+01:00).

Semifinals
16 December
(Italy) Civitanova	3
(Poland) Bełchatów	0
16 December
(Brazil) Sada	0
(Russia) Kazan	3

Final
17 December
(Italy) Civitanova	0
(Russia) Kazan	3
3rd place match
17 December
(Poland) Bełchatów	0
(Brazil) Sada	3

=== Semifinals ===
Date	Time		Score		Set 1	Set 2	Set 3	Set 4	Set 5	Total	Report
16 Dec	17:30	Sada Cruzeiro (Brazil)	0–3	(Russia) Zenit Kazan	23–25	19–25	18–25			60–75	P2 P3
16 Dec	20:30	Cucine Lube Civitanova (Italy)	3–0	(Poland) PGE Skra Bełchatów	25–23	25–23	25–23			75–69	P2 P3

=== 3rd place match ===
Date	Time		Score		Set 1	Set 2	Set 3	Set 4	Set 5	Total	Report
17 Dec	17:30	PGE Skra Bełchatów (Poland)	0–3	(Brazil) Sada Cruzeiro	19–25	18–25	13–25			50–75	P2 P3

=== Final ===
Date	Time		Score		Set 1	Set 2	Set 3	Set 4	Set 5	Total	Report
17 Dec	20:30	Cucine Lube Civitanova (Italy)	0–3	(Russia) Zenit Kazan	25–27	22–25	22–25			69–77	P2 P3

== Final standing ==
Rank	Team
1st place, gold medalist(s)	(Russia) Zenit Kazan
2nd place, silver medalist(s)	(Italy) Cucine Lube Civitanova
3rd place, bronze medalist(s)	(Brazil) Sada Cruzeiro
4	(Poland) PGE Skra Bełchatów
5	(China) Shanghai Golden Age
5	(Poland) ZAKSA Kędzierzyn-Koźle
7	(Argentina) Personal Bolívar
7	(Iran) Sarmayeh Bank Tehran

2017 Men's Club World Champions

1st title

14–man roster
Matt Anderson, Artem Volvich, Loran Alekno, Igor Yudin, Maxim Panteleymonenko, Nikita Alekseev, Wilfredo León, Aleksei Kononov, Valentin Krotkov, Aleksandr Butko (c), Aleksey Samoylenko, Alexander Gutsalyuk, Aleksey Verbov, Maxim Mikhaylov
Head coach
Vladimir Alekno

== Awards ==
- Most valuable player
  (Italy) Osmany Juantorena (Cucine Lube Civitanova)
- Best setter
  (Russia) Aleksandr Butko (Zenit Kazan)
- Best outside spikers
  (Cuba) Wilfredo León (Zenit Kazan)
  (Brazil) Yoandy Leal (Sada Cruzeiro)
- Best middle blockers
  (Russia) Aleksey Samoylenko (Zenit Kazan)
  (Cuba) Robertlandy Simón (Sada Cruzeiro)
- Best opposite spiker
  (Bulgaria) Tsvetan Sokolov (Cucine Lube Civitanova)
- Best libero
  (France) Jenia Grebennikov (Cucine Lube Civitanova)

== See also ==
- 2017 FIVB Volleyball Women's Club World Championship
