= Aleksey Verbov =

Russian volleyball player (born 1982)

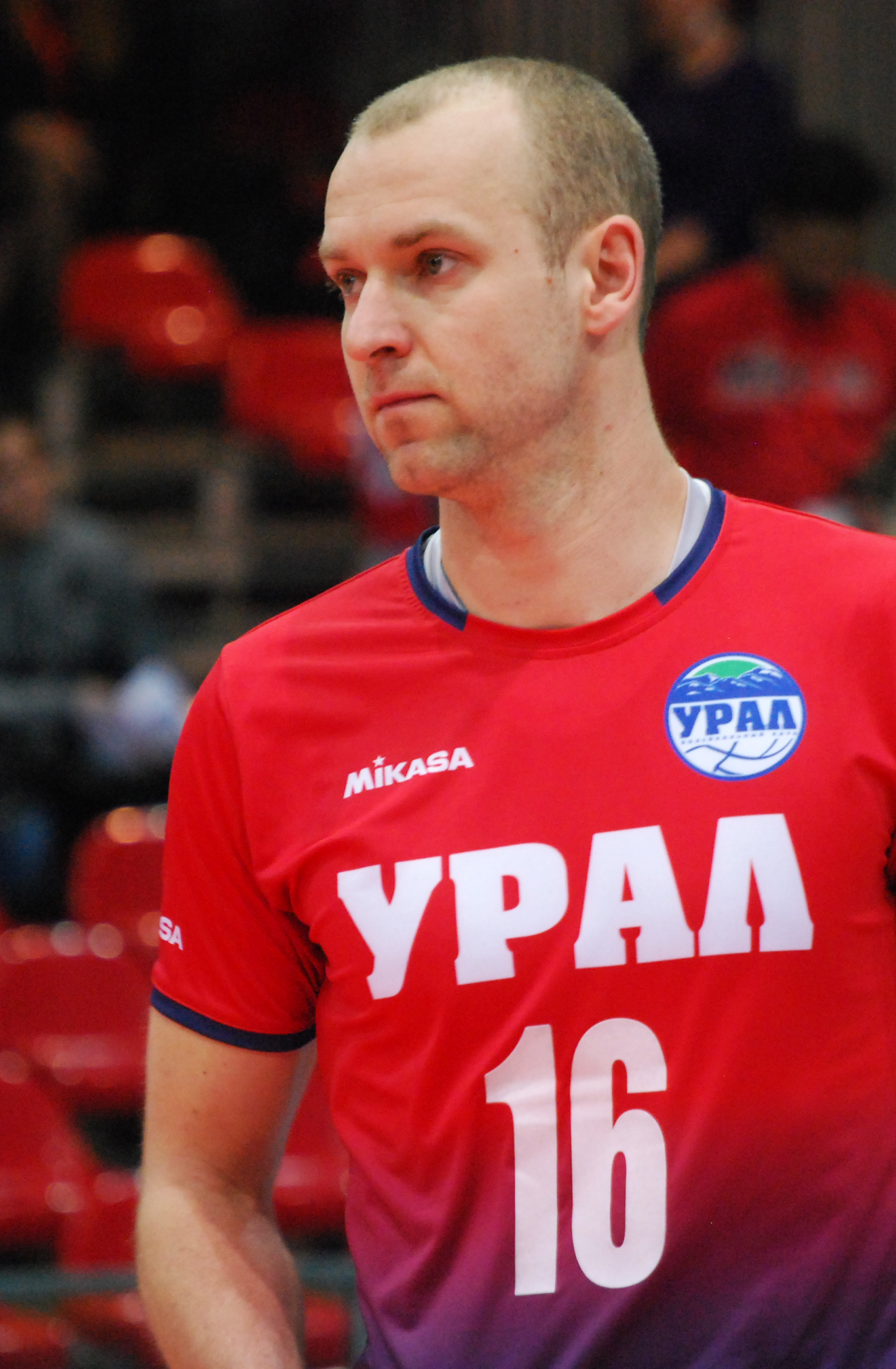

Personal information
- Full name: Aleksey Igorevich Verbov
- Nationality: Russian
- Born: 31 January 1982 (age 44); Moscow, Russia
- Height: 1.85 m (6 ft 1 in)
- Weight: 77 kg (170 lb)
- Spike: 315 cm (124 in)
- Block: 310 cm (122 in)

Coaching information
- Current team: Zenit Kazan
Previous teams coached
Years	Teams
2016–2017; 2018–2020; 2020–2021; 2021–	Zenit Kazan (coach); Zenit Kazan (coach); Kuzbass Kemerovo; Zenit Kazan

Volleyball information
- Position: Libero

Career
Years	Teams
1998–1999; 1999–2000; 2000–2002; 2003–2004; 2004–2005; 2005–2007; 2007–2009; 2009–2010; 2010–2012; 2012–2013; 2013–2019	Dynamo Moscow; MGTU-Luzhniki; CSKA Moscow; Belogorie Belgorod; Gazprom-Ugra Surgut; Belogorie Belgorod; Iskra Odintsovo; Zenit Kazan; Iskra Odintsovo; Ural Ufa; Zenit Kazan

National team
2004–2018	Russia
Honours
Men's volleyball
Representing Russia
Olympic Games
Bronze medal – third place	2004 Athens
Bronze medal – third place	2008 Beijing
World Cup
Silver medal – second place	2007 Japan
European Championship
Gold medal – first place	2013 Denmark/Poland
Silver medal – second place	2005 Italy/Serbia and Montenegro
Silver medal – second place	2007 Russia
World League
Silver medal – second place	2007 Katowice
Bronze medal – third place	2006 Moscow
Bronze medal – third place	2008 Rio de Janeiro
Bronze medal – third place	2009 Belgrade
- Last updated: 22 December 2020

Aleksey Igorevich Verbov (Russian: Алексей Игоревич Вербов, born 31 January 1982) is a retired Russian volleyball player, a former member of Russia men's national volleyball team and the Russian club Zenit Kazan. He is currently coaching the men's Zenit Kazan team.

With the Russian men's national team, he won the gold medal at the 2013 Men's European Volleyball Championship played in Denmark and Poland. He won the award as Best Libero in the tournament. He also won the bronze medal in the 2004 Summer Olympics in Athens, Greece.

He played with Lokomotiv Belgorod winning the bronze medal at the 2005–06 CEV Champions League; he won the award "Best Libero" also in this tournament.

== Sporting achievements ==
=== Clubs ===
==== CEV Champions League ====
- 2015/2016 - with Zenit Kazan
- 2016/2017 - with Zenit Kazan

==== FIVB Club World Championship ====
- Poland 2017 - with Zenit Kazan

==== National championships ====
- 2015/2016 Russian Championship, with Zenit Kazan

=== Individually ===
- 2006 CEV Champions League - Best Libero
- 2006 FIVB World Championship 2006 - Best Libero
- 2007 CEV European Championship - Best Libero
- 2008 Olympic Games Beijing - Best Digger
- 2009 CEV Champions League - Best Libero
- 2009 FIVB World League - Best Libero
- 2013 CEV European Championship - Best Libero

Awards
Preceded by (France) Hubert Henno	Best Libero of CEV Champions League; 2005/2006	Succeeded by (Germany) Markus Steuerwald
Preceded by (France) Hubert Henno	Best Libero of FIVB World Championship; 2006	Succeeded by (Germany) Ferdinand Tille
Preceded by (Italy) Mirko Corsano	Best Libero of CEV European Championship; 2007	Succeeded by (France) Hubert Henno
Preceded by (Brazil) Sérgio Santos	Best Digger; Olympic Games; Beijing 2008	Succeeded by (Bulgaria) Teodor Salparov
Preceded by (Brazil) Sérgio Santos	Best Libero of CEV Champions League; 2008/2009	Succeeded by (Italy) Andrea Bari
Preceded by (United States) Richard Lambourne	Best Libero of FIVB World League; 2009	Succeeded by (Brazil) Mario Pedreira
Preceded by (Italy) Andrea Bari	Best Libero of CEV European Championship; 2013	Succeeded by (France) Jenia Grebennikov
