= Loran Alekno =

Russian volleyball player (born 1996)

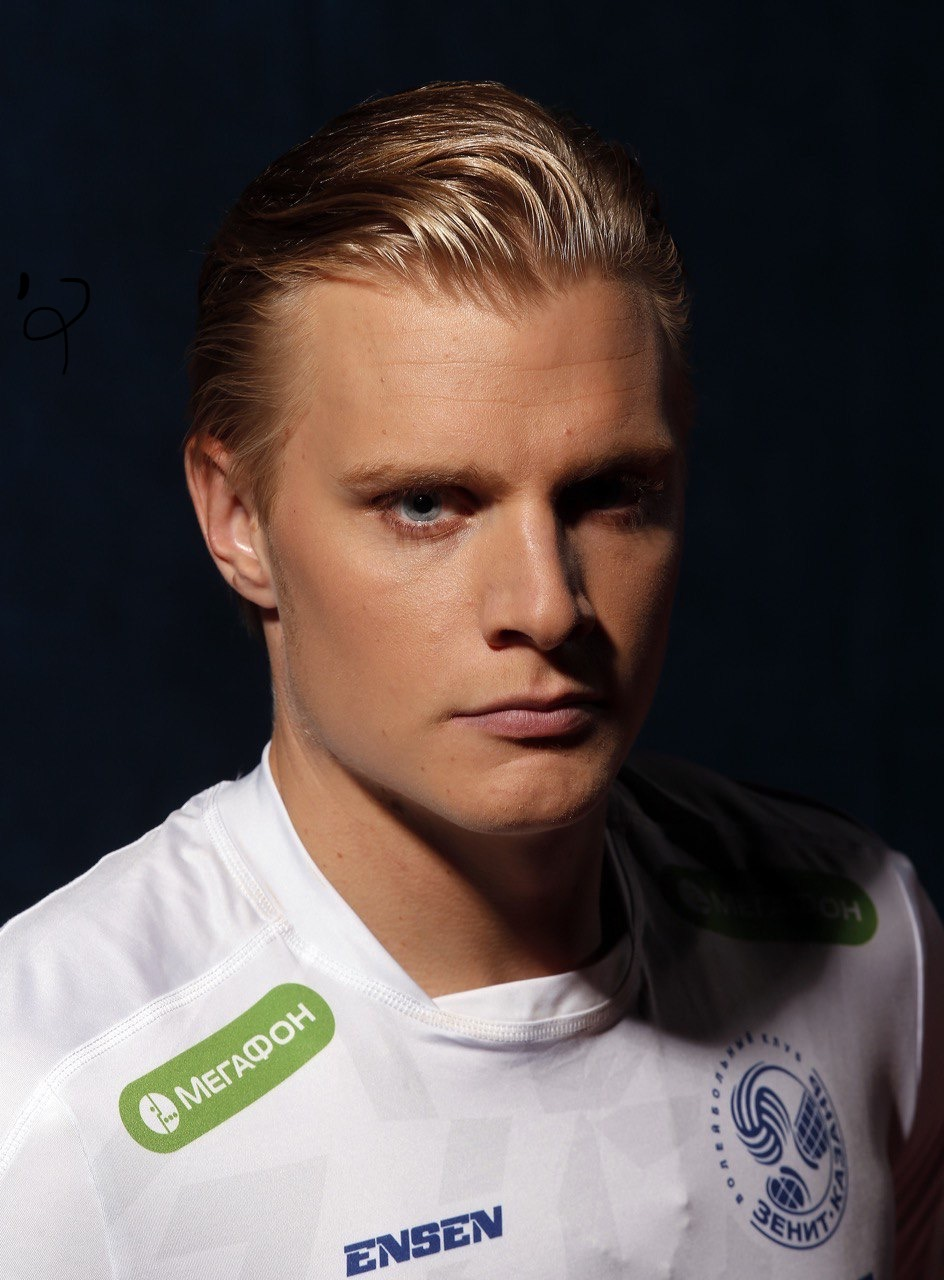
- Alekno in 2020

Personal information
- Full name: Loran Vladimirovich Alekno
- Nationality: Russian
- Born: 18 September 1996 (age 30); Tours, France
- Height: 1.90 m (6 ft 3 in)
- Weight: 90 kg (198 lb)
- Spike: 322 cm (127 in)
- Block: 315 cm (124 in)

Volleyball information
- Position: Setter
- Current club: Zenit Kazan
- Number: 5

Career
Years	Teams
2017–2021	Zenit Kazan
- Last updated: 5 October 2021

Loran Vladimirovich Alekno (Russian: Лоран Владимирович Алекно; born 18 September 1996) is former Russian volleyball player, known as a player for Russian club Zenit Kazan.

== Personal life ==
He is son of notable volleyball head coach Vladimir Alekno. He has an older sister Ekaterina (born 1987).

== Career ==
In 2017, Zenit Kazan coached by his father, added him to the main roster as backup setter. Previously he was educated in volleyball Academy of Kazan. On 17 December 2017 his team won the 2017 Club World Champion title.

== Sporting achievements ==
=== Clubs ===
==== FIVB Club World Championship ====
- Poland 2017 – with Zenit Kazan
- Betim 2019 – with Zenit Kazan

==== National championship ====
- 2016/2017 Russian Cup, with Zenit Kazan
- 2016/2017 Russian Championship, with Zenit Kazan

=== National team ===
- 2014 FIVB U21 World Championship
