= Artem Volvich =

Russian volleyball player (born 1990)

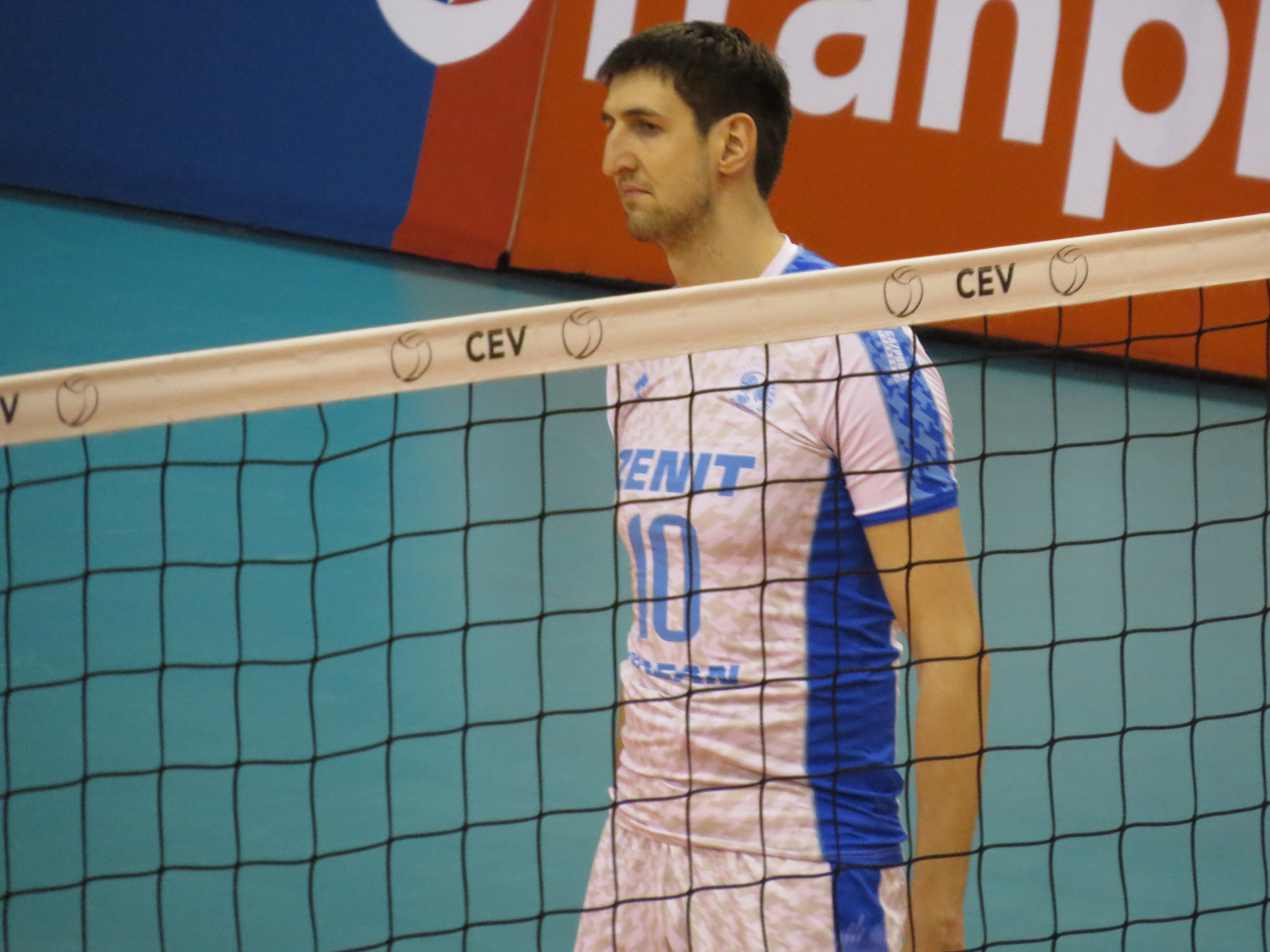

Personal information
- Nationality: Russian
- Born: 22 January 1990 (age 36); Nizhnevartovsk, Russia
- Height: 2.12 m (6 ft 11 in)
- Weight: 98 kg (216 lb)
- Spike: 352 cm (139 in)
- Block: 339 cm (133 in)

Volleyball information
- Position: Middle blocker
- Current club: VC Zenit-Kazan
- Number: 4

Career
Years	Teams
2007–2009; 2009–2011; 2011–2016; 2016–	Yugra Nizhnevartovsk; Ural Ufa; Lokomotiv Novosibirsk; VC Zenit-Kazan

National team
Russia
Honours
Volleyball
Representing ROC
Olympic Games
Silver medal – second place	2020 Tokyo	Team
Representing Russia
World Grand Champions Cup
Silver medal – second place	2013 Japan	Team
FIVB Nations League
Gold medal – first place	2018 Lille	Team
European Championship
Gold medal – first place	2013 Denmark/Poland	Team
Gold medal – first place	2017 Poland	Team
Summer Universiade
Gold medal – first place	2013 Kazan	Team
- Last updated: 3 September 2017

Artem Aleksandrovich Volvich (Russian: Артём Александрович Вольвич, IPA: [ɐrˈtʲɵm ˈvolʲvʲɪtɕ]; born 22 January 1990) is a Russian volleyball player, a member of Russia men's national volleyball team and Russian club VC Zenit-Kazan.

== Career ==
On March 17, 2013, he achieved with Lokomotiv Novosibirsk gold medal of the 2012–13 CEV Champions League. In 2013 he won the gold medal at the Universiade. He was a member of the Russian team at the 2016 Olympics and he received and individual award for the Best Middle Blocker. At his second Olympics in Tokyo, he won the silver medal.

== Sporting achievements ==
=== Clubs ===
==== CEV Champions League ====
- 2012/2013 – with Lokomotiv Novosibirsk
- 2016/2017 – with Zenit Kazan
- 2017/2018 – with Zenit Kazan
- 2018/2019 – with Zenit Kazan

==== FIVB Club World Championship ====
- Betim 2013 – with Lokomotiv Novosibirsk
- Betim 2016 – with Zenit Kazan
- Poland 2017 - with Zenit Kazan
- Brazil 2019 – with Zenit Kazan

==== National championships ====
- 2011/2012 Russian Cup 2012, with Lokomotiv Novosibirsk
- 2013/2014 Russian Championship, with Lokomotiv Novosibirsk
- 2016/2017 Russian SuperCup 2016, with Zenit Kazan
- 2016/2017 Russian Cup, with Zenit Kazan
- 2016/2017 Russian Championship, with Zenit Kazan
- 2017/2018 Russian SuperCup 2017, with Zenit Kazan
- 2017/2018 Russian Cup, with Zenit Kazan
- 2018/2019 Russian Championship, with Zenit Kazan

=== National team ===
- 2017 CEV European Championship
- 2018 FIVB Nations League

=== Individual ===
- 2016 Olympic Games – Best Middle Blocker
- 2016 FIVB Club World Championship – Best Middle Blocker
- 2016/2017 CEV Champions League – Best Middle Blocker
- 2019 FIVB Club World Championship – Best Middle Blocker

Awards
Preceded by First Award	Best Middle Blocker of Olympic Games; 2016 ex aequo (Italy) Emanuele Birarelli	Succeeded by (Russia) Ivan Iakovlev (France) Barthélémy Chinenyeze
Preceded by (Russia) Aleksandr Gutsalyuk (Bulgaria) Nikolay Nikolov	Best Middle Blocker of FIVB Club World Championship; 2016 ex aequo (Argentina) Pablo Crer; 2019 ex aequo (Cuba) Robertlandy Simón	Succeeded by (Cuba) Robertlandy Simón (Russia) Alexey Samoylenko
Preceded by (Argentina) Sebastian Sole (United States) Russell Holmes	Best Middle Blocker of CEV Champions League; 2016/2017 ex aequo (Serbia) Marko Podraščanin	Succeeded by (Serbia) Marko Podraščanin (Serbia) Dragan Stanković
