= Aleksandr Butko =

Russian volleyball player (born 1986)

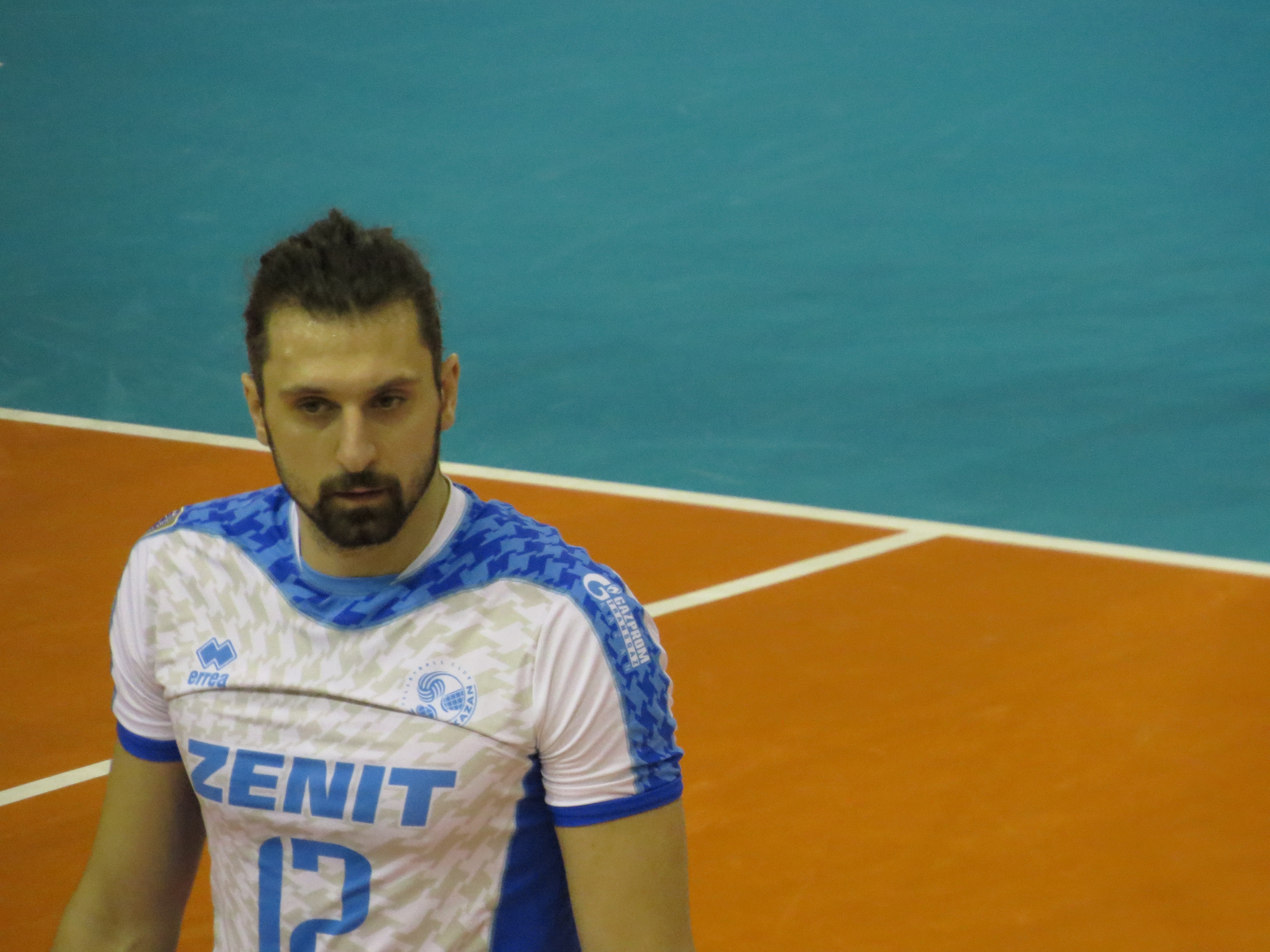

Personal information
- Nationality: Belarusian; Russian
- Born: March 18, 1986 (age 40); Grodno, Byelorussian SSR, Soviet Union
- Height: 1.98 m (6 ft 6 in)
- Weight: 97 kg (214 lb)
- Spike: 328 cm (129 in)
- Block: 319 cm (126 in)

Volleyball information
- Position: Setter
- Current club: Ural Ufa

Career
Years	Teams
2001–2003; 2003–2004; 2004–2006; 2006–2007; 2007–2009; 2009–2016; 2016–2021; 2021–2022; 2023; 2023–	Kommunalnik Grodno; Dynamo Moscow; Lutch Moscow; Lokomotiv Novosibirsk; Iskra Odintsovo; Lokomotiv Novosibirsk; Zenit Kazan; Kuzbass Kemerovo; Zenit Kazan; Ural Ufa

National team
2003; 2005–2019	Belarus; Russia
Honours
Men's volleyball
Representing Russia
Olympic Games
Gold medal – first place	2012 London	Team
World Cup
Gold medal – first place	2011 Japan
World League
Bronze medal – third place	2009 Belgrade
European Championship
Gold medal – first place	2017 Poland
- Last updated: 3 September 2017

Aleksandr Anatolyevich Butko (Russian: Александр Анатольевич Бутько; born 18 March 1986) is a Russian volleyball player, a member of Russia men's national volleyball team and Russian club Ural Ufa, 2012 Olympic Games.

In 2022, Butko was issued with a 15-month ban that ran from January 2022 to March 2023 for an anti-doping rule violation for trimetazidine following retesting of a sample made at the 2014 Russian National Volleyball Championships.

== Sporting achievements ==
=== Clubs ===
==== CEV Champions League ====
- 2008/2009 – with Iskra Odintsovo
- 2013/2014 – with Lokomotiv Novosibirsk
- 2015/2016 – with Zenit Kazan
- 2016/2017 – with Zenit Kazan
- 2017/2018 – with Zenit Kazan
- 2018/2019 – with Zenit Kazan

==== FIVB Club World Championship ====
- 2013 – with Lokomotiv Novosibirsk
- 2016 – with Zenit Kazan
- 2017 – with Zenit Kazan
- 2019 – with Zenit Kazan

==== National championships ====
- 2003/2004 Russian Championship, with Dynamo Moscow
- 2007/2008 Russian Championship, with Iskra Odintsovo
- 2008/2009 Russian Championship, with Iskra Odintsovo
- 2013/2014 Russian Championship, with Lokomotiv Novosibirsk
- 2015/2016 Russian Championship, with Zenit Kazan
- 2016/2017 Russian Championship, with Zenit Kazan
- 2017/2018 Russian Championship, with Zenit Kazan
- 2018/2019 Russian Championship, with Zenit Kazan
- 2019/2020 Russian Championship, with Zenit Kazan

=== National team ===
- 2011 FIVB World League
- 2011 FIVB World Cup
- 2012 Olympic Games
- 2017 CEV European Championship

=== Individual ===
- 2017 FIVB Club World Championship – Best Setter
- 2018 CEV Champions League – Best Setter
