= Aleksey Spiridonov (volleyball) =

Russian volleyball player (born 1988)

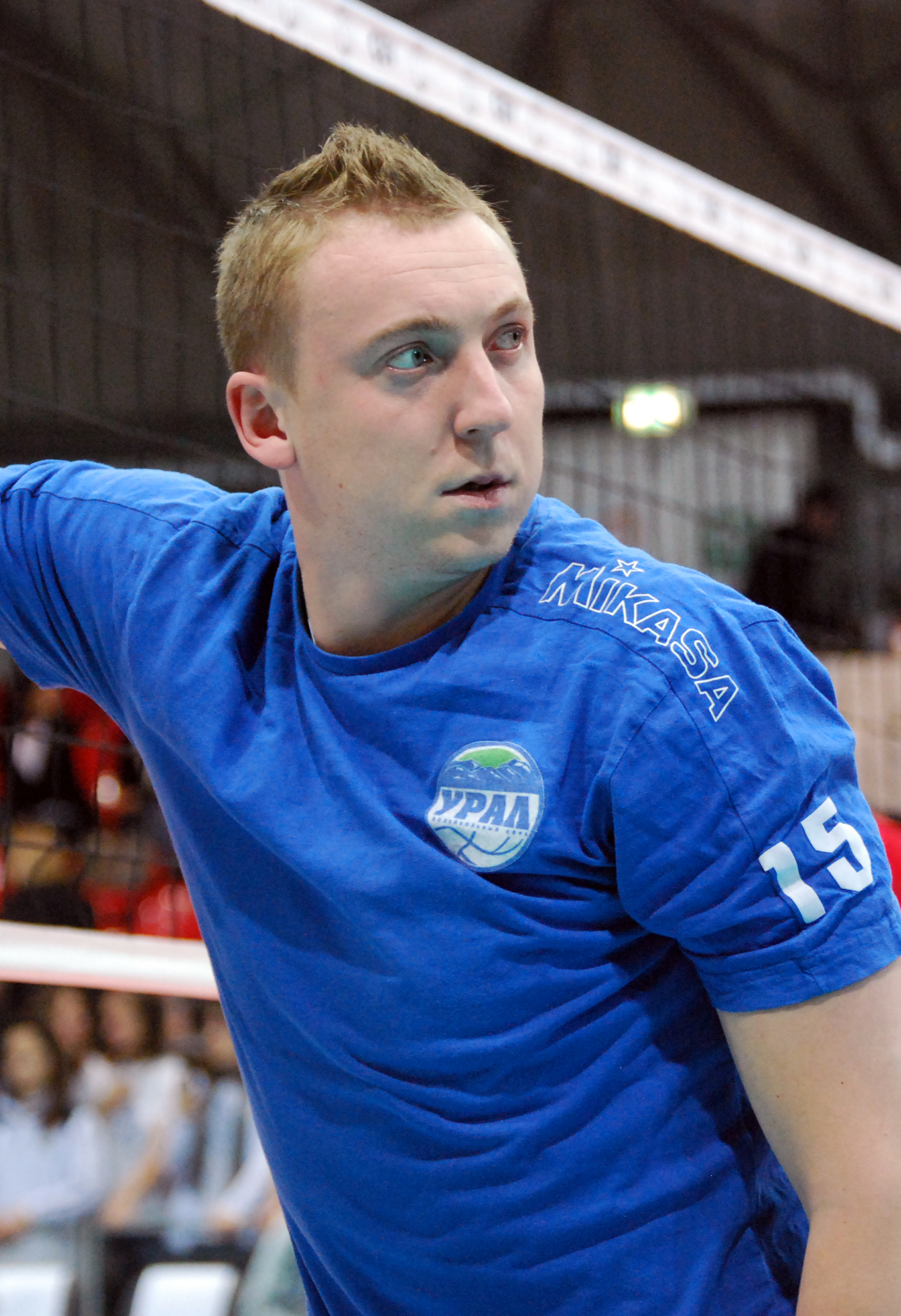

Personal information
- Full name: Aleksey Gayovitch Spiridonov
- Born: June 26, 1988 (age 38) Revyakino, Russia
- Height: 1.96 m (6 ft 5 in)
- Weight: 96 kg (212 lb)
- Spike: 347 cm (137 in)
- Block: 328 cm (129 in)

Volleyball information
- Position: Outside hitter
- Current club: Zenit Kazan
- Number: 15 (club), 9 (national team)

Career
- Years: Team
- 2008–2012 2012–2013 2013–2014 2014–2016 2016–2018 2018–: Iskra Odintsovo; Ural Ufa; Fakel Novy Urengoy; Zenit Kazan; Yenisey Krasnoyarsk; Zenit Kazan

National team
- Years: Team
- 2011–: Russia
Honours
Men's volleyball
Representing Russia
European Championship
Gold medal – first place	2013 Denmark/Poland
World Grand Champions Cup
Silver medal – second place	2013 Japan
World League
Gold medal – first place	2011 Gdańsk
Gold medal – first place	2013 Mar del Plata
- Updated on 21 December 2017

Aleksey Spiridonov (born 26 June 1988) is a Russian volleyball player, a member of Russia men's national volleyball team and Russian club Zenit Kazan, European Champion 2011, gold medalist of the World League (2011, 2013).

The player has attracted much controversy, especially due to his repeated and ongoing extreme Polonophobic statements.

== Career ==
In 2011 he was punished by Volleyball Federation of Russia because of drunkenness for six months.

During match with Germany at World Championship 2014 held in Poland, he made a "rifle shooting" gesture in the direction of fans. This was seen as a lack of respect for the fans and he was cautioned by the FIVB. He repeatedly insulted Poland in interviews with Russian media. During a match against Poland, he was accused of spitting on MP Marek Matuszewski, which he denied. In May 2015 Spiridonov was suspended for two matches for his misbehavior in the match against Germany. He missed two games at the start of the World League on May 28 and 29 against Poland.

== Sporting achievements ==
=== Clubs ===
==== CEV Champions League ====
- 2008/2009 - with Iskra Odintsovo
- 2014/2015 - with Zenit Kazan
- 2015/2016 - with Zenit Kazan

==== CEV Cup ====
- 2009/2010 - with Iskra Odintsovo

==== CEV Challenge Cup ====
- 2012/2013 - with Ural Ufa

==== FIVB Club World Championship ====
- Betim 2015 - with Zenit Kazan

==== National championships ====
- 2008/2009 Russian Championship, with Iskra Odintsovo
- 2011/2012 Russian Championship, with Iskra Odintsovo
- 2012/2013 Russian Championship, with Ural Ufa
- 2014/2015 Russian Cup 2015, with Zenit Kazan
- 2014/2015 Russian Championship, with Zenit Kazan
- 2015/2016 Russian SuperCup 2015, with Zenit Kazan
- 2015/2016 Russian Cup 2016, with Zenit Kazan
- 2015/2016 Russian Championship, with Zenit Kazan

=== Individually ===
- 2014 Memorial of Hubert Jerzy Wagner - Best Receiver
