= Jenia Grebennikov =

French volleyball player (born 1990)

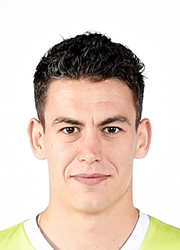
- Grebennikov in 2019

Personal information
- Born: 13 August 1990 (age 36); Rennes, France
- Height: 1.88 m (6 ft 2 in)
- Weight: 85 kg (187 lb)
- Spike: 345 cm (136 in)
- Block: 300 cm (118 in)

Volleyball information
- Position: Libero
- Current club: Wolfdogs Nagoya
- Number: 10

Career
Years	Teams
2008–2013; 2013–2015; 2015–2018; 2018–2020; 2020–2021; 2021–2026; 2026–	Rennes Volley 35; VfB Friedrichshafen; Cucine Lube Civitanova; Itas Trentino; Valsa Group Modena; Zenit Saint Petersburg; Wolfdogs Nagoya

National team
2011–	France
Honours
Men's volleyball
Representing France
Olympic Games
Gold medal – first place	2020 Tokyo	Team
Gold medal – first place	2024 Paris	Team
FIVB World League
Gold medal – first place	2015 Rio de Janeiro
Gold medal – first place	2017 Curitiba
Bronze medal – third place	2016 Kraków
FIVB Nations League
Gold medal – first place	2022 Bologna
Gold medal – first place	2024 Łódź
Silver medal – second place	2018 Lille
Bronze medal – third place	2021 Rimini
CEV European Championship
Gold medal – first place	2015 Bulgaria/Italy

Jenia Grebennikov (born 13 August 1990) is a French professional volleyball player of Russian descent who plays as a libero for SV League club Wolfdogs Nagoya and the France national team. Grebennikov won a gold medal in the men's tournament at the Olympic Games Tokyo 2020 and is the 2015 European Champion.

== Personal life ==
Grebennikov was born in Rennes, France. His father Boris Grebennikov is a former Soviet and Kazakh volleyball player and coach. He married his longtime girlfriend Wiem on 31 December 2018.

== Career ==
=== Clubs ===
In April 2015, he signed a contract with the Italian team, Cucine Lube Civitanova.

=== National team ===
Jenia Grebennikov debuted on the French national team in 2011. In 2014 he played at the World Championship 2014 held in Poland. France lost the match for the bronze medal with Germany and took 4th place. Grebennikov received an individual award for the Best Libero of the tournament. On 18 October 2015 the French national team, including Grebennikov, achieved the title of the European Champion 2015 (3–0 with Slovenia in the finale). He was awarded Best Libero of the championships.

== Honours ==
=== Club ===
- CEV Champions League
  - 2017–18 – with Cucine Lube Civitanova
- FIVB Club World Championship
  - Poland 2017 – with Cucine Lube Civitanova
  - Poland 2018 – with Trentino Volley
- CEV Cup
  - 2018–19 – with Trentino Volley
- Domestic
  - 2011–12 French Cup, with Rennes Volley 35
  - 2013–14 German Cup, with VfB Friedrichshafen
  - 2014–15 German Cup, with VfB Friedrichshafen
  - 2014–15 German Championship, with VfB Friedrichshafen
  - 2016–17 Italian Cup, with Cucine Lube Civitanova
  - 2016–17 Italian Championship, with Cucine Lube Civitanova

=== Individual awards ===
- 2011: French Championship – Best libero
- 2012: French Championship – Most valuable player
- 2012: French Championship – Best libero
- 2014: FIVB World Championship – Best libero
- 2015: CEV European Championship – Best libero
- 2016: CEV Champions League – Best libero
- 2016: FIVB World League – Best libero
- 2017: CEV Champions League – Best libero
- 2017: FIVB Club World Championship – Best libero
- 2018: CEV Champions League – Best libero
- 2018: FIVB Nations League – Best libero
- 2018: FIVB Club World Championship – Best libero
- 2021: Olympic Games – Best libero
- 2022: FIVB Nations League – Best libero
- 2024: Olympic Games Paris – Best libero

=== State awards ===
- 2021: Knight of the Legion of Honour

Awards
Preceded by (Germany) Ferdinand Tille	Best Libero of FIVB World Championship; 2014	Succeeded by (Poland) Paweł Zatorski
Preceded by (Russia) Aleksey Verbov	Best Libero of CEV European Championship; 2015	Succeeded by (Belgium) Lowie Stuer
Preceded by (Bulgaria) Teodor Salparov	Best Libero of CEV Champions League; 2015/2016; 2016/2017; 2017/2018	Succeeded by Not awarded
Preceded by (Poland) Paweł Zatorski	Best Libero of FIVB World League; 2016	Succeeded by (Canada) Blair Bann
Preceded by (Brazil) Sérgio Nogueira	Best Libero of FIVB Club World Championship; 2017; 2018	Succeeded by (Italy) Fabio Balaso
Preceded by FIVB World League	Best Libero of FIVB Nations League; 2018	Succeeded by (United States) Erik Shoji
Preceded by (Brazil) Sérgio Santos	Best Libero of Olympic Games; Tokyo 2020; Paris 2024	Succeeded by –
Preceded by (Brazil) Thales Hoss	Best Libero of FIVB Nations League; 2022	Succeeded by (Poland) Paweł Zatorski
