= 2016–17 CEV Champions League =

- League: CEV Champions League
- Sport: Volleyball
- Duration: Qualifying round: 1 November – 20 November 2016; Main tournament: 6 December 2016 – 30 April 2017
- Number of teams: 36 (24 qual. + 12 main tourn.)

Finals
- Venue: (Italy) Rome
- Champions: (Russia) Zenit Kazan
- Finals MVP: (Russia) Maxim Mikhaylov

CEV Champions League seasons
- ← 2015–16 2017–18 →

The 2016–17 CEV Champions League was the 58th edition of the highest level European volleyball club competition organised by the European Volleyball Confederation.

== Qualification ==
Rank	Country	Vacancies	Qualified teams
1	Russia	2	Zenit Kazan
1	Russia	2	Dynamo Moscow
2	Italy	2	Azimut Modena
2	Italy	2	Cucine Lube Civitanova
3	Turkey	2	Halkbank Ankara
3	Turkey	2	İstanbul BBSK
4	Poland	2	ZAKSA Kędzierzyn-Koźle
4	Poland	2	Asseco Resovia
5	Germany	1	Berlin Recycling Volleys
6	Belgium	1	Knack Roeselare
7	France	1	Paris Volley
8	Romania	1	SCM U Craiova
Qualification round		8	Belogorie Belgorod
Qualification round		8	Sir Sicoma Colussi Perugia
Qualification round		8	Arkas İzmir
Qualification round		8	PGE Skra Bełchatów
Qualification round		8	VfB Friedrichshafen
Qualification round		8	Noliko Maaseik
Qualification round		8	ACH Volley Ljubljana
Qualification round		8	Dukla Liberec

== Pools composition ==
Pool A	Pool B	Pool C
ZAKSA Kędzierzyn-Koźle	Berlin Recycling Volleys	Zenit Kazan
Dynamo Moscow	Cucine Lube Civitanova	Paris Volley
İstanbul BBSK	Asseco Resovia	Arkas İzmir
Noliko Maaseik	Dukla Liberec	VfB Friedrichshafen

Pool D	Pool E
Azimut Modena	Halkbank Ankara
SCM U Craiova	Knack Roeselare
PGE Skra Bełchatów	Belogorie Belgorod
ACH Volley Ljubljana	Sir Sicoma Colussi Perugia

== League round ==
- All times are local

=== Pool A ===
Pos	Team	Pld	W	L	Pts	SW	SL	SR	SPW	SPL	SPR	Qualification
1	(Poland) ZAKSA Kędzierzyn-Koźle	6	5	1	15	16	5	3.200	531	469	1.132	Playoffs
2	(Russia) Dynamo Moscow	6	4	2	11	14	10	1.400	563	552	1.020	Playoffs
3	(Turkey) İstanbul BBSK	6	2	4	7	9	14	0.643	506	534	0.948	Playoffs
4	(Belgium) Noliko Maaseik	6	1	5	3	7	17	0.412	513	557	0.921	

Date	Time		Score		Set 1	Set 2	Set 3	Set 4	Set 5	Total	Report
6 Dec	18:00	ZAKSA Kędzierzyn-Koźle (Poland)	3–0	(Turkey) İstanbul BBSK	25–12	28–26	29–27			82–65	Report
7 Dec	19:00	Dynamo Moscow (Russia)	3–1	(Belgium) Noliko Maaseik	25–22	23–25	25–22	25–20		98–89	Report
21 Dec	18:00	İstanbul BBSK (Turkey)	1–3	(Russia) Dynamo Moscow	25–19	18–25	18–25	22–25		83–94	Report
21 Dec	20:30	Noliko Maaseik (Belgium)	0–3	(Poland) ZAKSA Kędzierzyn-Koźle	23–25	22–25	21–25			66–75	Report
18 Jan	19:00	Dynamo Moscow (Russia)	1–3	(Poland) ZAKSA Kędzierzyn-Koźle	23–25	21–25	30–28	20–25		94–103	Report
18 Jan	20:30	Noliko Maaseik (Belgium)	3–2	(Turkey) İstanbul BBSK	25–22	25–21	17–25	21–25	15–11	103–104	Report
31 Jan	18:00	ZAKSA Kędzierzyn-Koźle (Poland)	3–1	(Russia) Dynamo Moscow	25–17	25–22	27–29	25–21		102–89	Report
1 Feb	18:00	İstanbul BBSK (Turkey)	3–1	(Belgium) Noliko Maaseik	25–19	19–25	25–22	25–18		94–84	Report
14 Feb	18:00	ZAKSA Kędzierzyn-Koźle (Poland)	3–0	(Belgium) Noliko Maaseik	25–23	25–19	25–21			75–63	Report
15 Feb	19:00	Dynamo Moscow (Russia)	3–0	(Turkey) İstanbul BBSK	25–21	25–22	27–25			77–68	Report
1 Mar	18:00	İstanbul BBSK (Turkey)	3–1	(Poland) ZAKSA Kędzierzyn-Koźle	25–23	16–25	25–22	26–24		92–94	Report
1 Mar	20:30	Noliko Maaseik (Belgium)	2–3	(Russia) Dynamo Moscow	22–25	25–18	30–28	18–25	12–15	107–111	Report

=== Pool B ===
Pos	Team	Pld	W	L	Pts	SW	SL	SR	SPW	SPL	SPR	Qualification
1	(Italy) Cucine Lube Civitanova	6	5	1	15	16	4	4.000	485	397	1.222	Playoffs
2	(Germany) Berlin Recycling Volleys	6	4	2	12	14	9	1.556	504	487	1.035	Playoffs
3	(Poland) Asseco Resovia	6	3	3	8	11	14	0.786	522	530	0.985	Playoffs
4	(Czech Republic) Dukla Liberec	6	0	6	1	4	18	0.222	436	533	0.818	

Date	Time		Score		Set 1	Set 2	Set 3	Set 4	Set 5	Total	Report
6 Dec	19:30	Berlin Recycling Volleys (Germany)	3–1	(Italy) Cucine Lube Civitanova	21–25	25–16	25–18	26–24		97–83	Report
8 Dec	18:00	Dukla Liberec (Czech Republic)	2–3	(Poland) Asseco Resovia	14–25	16–25	25–21	25–23	15–17	95–111	Report
20 Dec	20:30	Cucine Lube Civitanova (Italy)	3–0	(Czech Republic) Dukla Liberec	25–21	25–15	25–20			75–56	Report
22 Dec	18:00	Asseco Resovia (Poland)	3–2	(Germany) Berlin Recycling Volleys	21–25	25–15	23–25	25–22	15–12	109–99	Report
18 Jan	18:00	Dukla Liberec (Czech Republic)	0–3	(Germany) Berlin Recycling Volleys	18–25	23–25	16–25			57–75	Report
19 Jan	20:30	Asseco Resovia (Poland)	0–3	(Italy) Cucine Lube Civitanova	22–25	13–25	14–25			49–75	Report
1 Feb	20:30	Cucine Lube Civitanova (Italy)	3–0	(Poland) Asseco Resovia	25–21	25–16	25–16			75–53	Report
2 Feb	19:30	Berlin Recycling Volleys (Germany)	3–0	(Czech Republic) Dukla Liberec	25–17	25–22	25–19			75–58	Report
14 Feb	19:30	Berlin Recycling Volleys (Germany)	3–2	(Poland) Asseco Resovia	25–20	25–22	21–25	20–25	15–13	106–105	Report
15 Feb	18:00	Dukla Liberec (Czech Republic)	1–3	(Italy) Cucine Lube Civitanova	25–22	28–30	23–25	14–25		90–102	Report
1 Mar	18:00	Asseco Resovia (Poland)	3–1	(Czech Republic) Dukla Liberec	20–25	25–18	25–19	25–18		95–80	Report
1 Mar	20:30	Cucine Lube Civitanova (Italy)	3–0	(Germany) Berlin Recycling Volleys	25–14	25–23	25–15			75–52	Report

=== Pool C ===
Pos	Team	Pld	W	L	Pts	SW	SL	SR	SPW	SPL	SPR	Qualification
1	(Russia) Zenit Kazan	6	6	0	18	18	1	18.000	489	355	1.377	Playoffs
2	(Turkey) Arkas İzmir	6	4	2	9	12	13	0.923	517	560	0.923	Playoffs
3	(Germany) VfB Friedrichshafen	6	1	5	5	10	17	0.588	572	601	0.952	
4	(France) Paris Volley	6	1	5	4	8	17	0.471	503	565	0.890	

Date	Time		Score		Set 1	Set 2	Set 3	Set 4	Set 5	Total	Report
6 Dec	20:30	Paris Volley (France)	2–3	(Germany) VfB Friedrichshafen	25–22	26–24	18–25	18–25	13–15	100–111	Report
7 Dec	19:30	Arkas İzmir (Turkey)	0–3	(Russia) Zenit Kazan	14–25	11–25	17–25			42–75	Report
21 Dec	19:00	Zenit Kazan (Russia)	3–0	(France) Paris Volley	25–17	25–15	25–21			75–53	Report
22 Dec	20:00	VfB Friedrichshafen (Germany)	2–3	(Turkey) Arkas İzmir	21–25	23–25	25–22	25–19	12–15	106–106	Report
18 Jan	20:00	VfB Friedrichshafen (Germany)	1–3	(Russia) Zenit Kazan	13–25	25–23	13–25	21–25		72–98	Report
18 Jan	20:30	Paris Volley (France)	1–3	(Turkey) Arkas İzmir	20–25	17–25	25–15	22–25		84–90	Report
31 Jan	19:00	Zenit Kazan (Russia)	3–0	(Germany) VfB Friedrichshafen	25–18	40–38	25–17			90–73	Report
1 Feb	19:30	Arkas İzmir (Turkey)	3–2	(France) Paris Volley	25–21	23–25	16–25	25–19	23–21	112–111	Report
15 Feb	19:00	Paris Volley (France)	0–3	(Russia) Zenit Kazan	19–25	21–25	20–25			60–75	Report
15 Feb	19:30	Arkas İzmir (Turkey)	3–2	(Germany) VfB Friedrichshafen	25–22	25–27	26–24	21–25	15–10	112–108	Report
1 Mar	19:00	Zenit Kazan (Russia)	3–0	(Turkey) Arkas İzmir	25–15	26–24	25–16			76–55	Report
1 Mar	20:00	VfB Friedrichshafen (Germany)	2–3	(France) Paris Volley	20–25	25–9	23–25	25–21	9–15	102–95	Report

=== Pool D ===
Pos	Team	Pld	W	L	Pts	SW	SL	SR	SPW	SPL	SPR	Qualification
1	(Italy) Azimut Modena	6	5	1	15	17	8	2.125	583	526	1.108	Playoffs
2	(Poland) PGE Skra Bełchatów	6	3	3	9	12	11	1.091	533	509	1.047	Playoffs
3	(Romania) SCM U Craiova	6	2	4	7	9	14	0.643	498	544	0.915	
4	(Slovenia) ACH Volley Ljubljana	6	2	4	5	11	16	0.688	569	604	0.942	

Date	Time		Score		Set 1	Set 2	Set 3	Set 4	Set 5	Total	Report
6 Dec	18:00	SCM U Craiova (Romania)	3–1	(Poland) PGE Skra Bełchatów	30–28	25–23	19–25	25–22		99–98	Report
6 Dec	20:30	Azimut Modena (Italy)	3–2	(Slovenia) ACH Volley Ljubljana	25–22	21–25	25–19	23–25	15–11	109–102	Report
20 Dec	17:30	PGE Skra Bełchatów (Poland)	1–3	(Italy) Azimut Modena	22–25	25–21	17–25	22–25		86–96	Report
20 Dec	18:00	ACH Volley Ljubljana (Slovenia)	3–2	(Romania) SCM U Craiova	25–17	18–25	17–25	25–21	15–13	100–101	Report
17 Jan	20:30	Azimut Modena (Italy)	3–1	(Romania) SCM U Craiova	24–26	29–27	25–18	25–16		103–87	Report
19 Jan	18:00	ACH Volley Ljubljana (Slovenia)	1–3	(Poland) PGE Skra Bełchatów	19–25	21–25	25–18	15–25		80–93	Report
31 Jan	19:00	SCM U Craiova (Romania)	0–3	(Italy) Azimut Modena	16–25	19–25	18–25			53–75	Report
1 Feb	18:00	PGE Skra Bełchatów (Poland)	3–1	(Slovenia) ACH Volley Ljubljana	25–17	25–23	20–25	25–17		95–82	Report
14 Feb	20:30	Azimut Modena (Italy)	3–1	(Poland) PGE Skra Bełchatów	25–16	21–25	25–22	25–22		96–85	Report
15 Feb	19:00	SCM U Craiova (Romania)	3–1	(Slovenia) ACH Volley Ljubljana	25–19	27–29	25–21	25–23		102–92	Report
1 Mar	17:00	ACH Volley Ljubljana (Slovenia)	3–2	(Italy) Azimut Modena	25–21	23–25	25–27	25–20	15–11	113–104	Report
1 Mar	20:00	PGE Skra Bełchatów (Poland)	3–0	(Romania) SCM U Craiova	26–24	25–18	25–14			76–56	Report

=== Pool E ===
Pos	Team	Pld	W	L	Pts	SW	SL	SR	SPW	SPL	SPR	Qualification
1	(Italy) Sir Sicoma Colussi Perugia (Note: Qualified as hosts) (H)	6	5	1	14	17	8	2.125	556	519	1.071	Final Four
2	(Russia) Belogorie Belgorod	6	3	3	11	15	12	1.250	570	567	1.005	Playoffs
3	(Belgium) Knack Roeselare	6	3	3	9	12	12	1.000	542	524	1.034	Playoffs
4	(Turkey) Halkbank Ankara	6	1	5	2	5	17	0.294	467	525	0.890	

(H) Host
Notes:

Date	Time		Score		Set 1	Set 2	Set 3	Set 4	Set 5	Total	Report
7 Dec	17:30	Halkbank Ankara (Turkey)	0–3	(Italy) Sir Sicoma Colussi Perugia	19–25	23–25	23–25			65–75	Report
8 Dec	20:30	Knack Roeselare (Belgium)	2–3	(Russia) Belogorie Belgorod	25–27	20–25	25–19	25–19	13–15	108–105	Report
22 Dec	19:00	Belogorie Belgorod (Russia)	3–0	(Turkey) Halkbank Ankara	25–14	30–28	25–21			80–63	Report
22 Dec	20:30	Sir Sicoma Colussi Perugia (Italy)	3–0	(Belgium) Knack Roeselare	25–22	25–21	25–23			75–66	Report
18 Jan	17:30	Halkbank Ankara (Turkey)	1–3	(Belgium) Knack Roeselare	24–26	19–25	26–24	23–25		92–100	Report
18 Jan	20:30	Sir Sicoma Colussi Perugia (Italy)	3–2	(Russia) Belogorie Belgorod	11–25	25–14	31–29	18–25	15–13	100–106	Report
1 Feb	19:00	Belogorie Belgorod (Russia)	2–3	(Italy) Sir Sicoma Colussi Perugia	19–25	25–16	26–24	17–25	11–15	98–105	Report
1 Feb	20:30	Knack Roeselare (Belgium)	3–0	(Turkey) Halkbank Ankara	25–12	31–29	25–18			81–59	Report
15 Feb	17:30	Halkbank Ankara (Turkey)	3–2	(Russia) Belogorie Belgorod	25–19	22–25	25–14	22–25	15–8	109–91	Report
15 Feb	20:30	Knack Roeselare (Belgium)	3–2	(Italy) Sir Sicoma Colussi Perugia	25–18	20–25	20–25	25–22	15–13	105–103	Report
1 Mar	18:00	Belogorie Belgorod (Russia)	3–1	(Belgium) Knack Roeselare	25–20	25–20	15–25	25–17		90–82	Report
1 Mar	19:00	Sir Sicoma Colussi Perugia (Italy)	3–1	(Turkey) Halkbank Ankara	23–25	25–18	25–20	25–16		98–79	Report

=== Third place ranking ===
Pos	Team	Pld	W	L	Pts	SW	SL	SR	SPW	SPL	SPR	Qualification
1	(Belgium) Knack Roeselare	6	3	3	9	12	12	1.000	542	524	1.034	Playoffs
2	(Poland) Asseco Resovia	6	3	3	8	11	14	0.786	522	530	0.985	Playoffs
3	(Turkey) İstanbul BBSK	6	2	4	7	9	14	0.643	506	534	0.948	Playoffs
4	(Romania) SCM U Craiova	6	2	4	7	9	14	0.643	498	544	0.915	
5	(Germany) VfB Friedrichshafen	6	1	5	5	10	17	0.588	572	601	0.952	

== Playoffs ==
- All times are local

=== Playoff 12 ===
Team 1	Agg.	Team 2	1st leg	2nd leg	Golden Set
Arkas İzmir (Turkey)	0–6	(Russia) Dynamo Moscow	0–3	0–3	
İstanbul BBSK (Turkey)	3–3	(Germany) Berlin Recycling Volleys	3–2	2–3	11–15
Asseco Resovia (Poland)	1–5	(Italy) Azimut Modena	2–3	1–3	
PGE Skra Bełchatów (Poland)	2–4	(Italy) Cucine Lube Civitanova	1–3	3–2	
Belogorie Belgorod (Russia)	6–0	(Poland) ZAKSA Kędzierzyn-Koźle	3–1	3–1	
Knack Roeselare (Belgium)	0–6	(Russia) Zenit Kazan	0–3	0–3	

==== First leg ====
Date	Time		Score		Set 1	Set 2	Set 3	Set 4	Set 5	Total	Report
16 Mar	19:00	Arkas İzmir (Turkey)	0–3	(Russia) Dynamo Moscow	20–25	17–25	16–25			53–75	Report
15 Mar	18:00	İstanbul BBSK (Turkey)	3–2	(Germany) Berlin Recycling Volleys	25–20	30–32	25–22	20–25	15–13	115–112	Report
15 Mar	20:30	Asseco Resovia (Poland)	2–3	(Italy) Azimut Modena	25–23	19–25	27–25	19–25	12–15	102–113	Report
15 Mar	18:00	PGE Skra Bełchatów (Poland)	1–3	(Italy) Cucine Lube Civitanova	21–25	25–21	23–25	21–25		90–96	Report
15 Mar	19:00	Belogorie Belgorod (Russia)	3–1	(Poland) ZAKSA Kędzierzyn-Koźle	13–25	25–21	25–23	25–20		88–89	Report
14 Mar	20:30	Knack Roeselare (Belgium)	0–3	(Russia) Zenit Kazan	23–25	19–25	18–25			60–75	Report

==== Second leg ====
Date	Time		Score		Set 1	Set 2	Set 3	Set 4	Set 5	Total	Report
21 Mar	19:00	Dynamo Moscow (Russia)	3–0	(Turkey) Arkas İzmir	25–23	25–22	33–31			83–76	Report
21 Mar	19:30	Berlin Recycling Volleys (Germany)	3–2	(Turkey) İstanbul BBSK	21–25	18–25	25–13	25–14	16–14	105–91	Report
Golden set		Berlin Recycling Volleys (Germany)	15–11	(Turkey) İstanbul BBSK							
23 Mar	20:30	Azimut Modena (Italy)	3–1	(Poland) Asseco Resovia	25–23	20–25	25–23	25–23		95–94	Report
22 Mar	20:30	Cucine Lube Civitanova (Italy)	2–3	(Poland) PGE Skra Bełchatów	26–24	25–16	26–28	15–25	13–15	105–108	Report
22 Mar	18:00	ZAKSA Kędzierzyn-Koźle (Poland)	1–3	(Russia) Belogorie Belgorod	22–25	25–20	24–26	21–25		92–96	Report
22 Mar	19:00	Zenit Kazan (Russia)	3–0	(Belgium) Knack Roeselare	25–19	25–16	25–20			75–55	Report

=== Playoff 6 ===
Team 1	Agg.	Team 2	1st leg	2nd leg
Berlin Recycling Volleys (Germany)	4–2	(Russia) Dynamo Moscow	3–2	3–2
Azimut Modena (Italy)	0–6	(Italy) Cucine Lube Civitanova	0–3	0–3
Zenit Kazan (Russia)	6–0	(Russia) Belogorie Belgorod	3–1	3–0

==== First leg ====
Date	Time		Score		Set 1	Set 2	Set 3	Set 4	Set 5	Total	Report
5 Apr	19:30	Berlin Recycling Volleys (Germany)	3–2	(Russia) Dynamo Moscow	23–25	22–25	25–19	25–18	15–10	110–97	Report
5 Apr	20:30	Azimut Modena (Italy)	0–3	(Italy) Cucine Lube Civitanova	23–25	18–25	27–29			68–79	Report
4 Apr	19:30	Zenit Kazan (Russia)	3–1	(Russia) Belogorie Belgorod	25–14	25–17	23–25	26–24		99–80	Report

==== Second leg ====
Date	Time		Score		Set 1	Set 2	Set 3	Set 4	Set 5	Total	Report
12 Apr	19:00	Dynamo Moscow (Russia)	2–3	(Germany) Berlin Recycling Volleys	35–37	25–22	25–21	15–25	8–15	108–120	Report
13 Apr	20:30	Cucine Lube Civitanova (Italy)	3–0	(Italy) Azimut Modena	25–21	25–21	25–18			75–60	Report
13 Apr	19:00	Belogorie Belgorod (Russia)	0–3	(Russia) Zenit Kazan	22–25	28–30	21–25			71–80	Report

== Final Four ==
- Organizer: (Italy) Sir Sicoma Colussi Perugia
- Place: Rome
- All times are Central European Summer Time (UTC+02:00).

Semifinals
29 April
(Italy) Sir Sicoma Colussi Perugia	3
(Italy) Cucine Lube Civitanova	2
29 April
(Germany) Berlin Recycling Volleys	0
(Russia) Zenit Kazan	3

Final
30 April
(Italy) Sir Sicoma Colussi Perugia	0
(Russia) Zenit Kazan	3
3rd place match
30 April
(Italy) Cucine Lube Civitanova	3
(Germany) Berlin Recycling Volleys	1

=== Semifinals ===
Date	Time		Score		Set 1	Set 2	Set 3	Set 4	Set 5	Total	Report
29 Apr	16:30	Berlin Recycling Volleys (Germany)	0–3	(Russia) Zenit Kazan	21–25	22–25	13–25			56–75	Report
29 Apr	19:30	Sir Sicoma Colussi Perugia (Italy)	3–2	(Italy) Cucine Lube Civitanova	25–19	22–25	25–19	21–25	15–9	108–97	Report

=== 3rd place match ===
Date	Time		Score		Set 1	Set 2	Set 3	Set 4	Set 5	Total	Report
30 Apr	16:00	Cucine Lube Civitanova (Italy)	3–1	(Germany) Berlin Recycling Volleys	29–27	22–25	25–21	25–21		101–94	Report

=== Final ===
Date	Time		Score		Set 1	Set 2	Set 3	Set 4	Set 5	Total	Report
30 Apr	19:00	Sir Sicoma Colussi Perugia (Italy)	0–3	(Russia) Zenit Kazan	15–25	23–25	14–25			52–75	Report

== Final standings ==
Qualified for the 2017 FIVB Club World Championship

Rank	Team
1st place, gold medalist(s)	(Russia) Zenit Kazan
2nd place, silver medalist(s)	(Italy) Sir Sicoma Colussi Perugia
3rd place, bronze medalist(s)	(Italy) Cucine Lube Civitanova
4	(Germany) Berlin Recycling Volleys

2016–17 CEV Champions League winners
(Russia)
Zenit Kazan
5th title

== Awards ==
- Most valuable player
  (Russia) Maxim Mikhaylov (Zenit Kazan)
- Best setter
  (Argentina) Luciano De Cecco (Sir Sicoma Colussi Perugia)
- Best outside spikers
  (Cuba) Wilfredo León (Zenit Kazan)
  (Italy) Ivan Zaytsev (Sir Sicoma Colussi Perugia)
- Best middle blockers
  (Serbia) Marko Podraščanin (Sir Sicoma Colussi Perugia)
  (Russia) Artem Volvich (Zenit Kazan)
- Best opposite spiker
  (Serbia) Aleksandar Atanasijević (Sir Sicoma Colussi Perugia)
- Best libero
  (France) Jenia Grebennikov (Cucine Lube Civitanova)

== Attendances ==
- Attendances include playoff games:

Pos	Team	Total	High	Low	Average	Change
	Final Four games	39,500	11,500	8,000	9,875	
1	(Poland) PGE Skra Bełchatów	24,100	10,900	2,550	6,025	
2	(Russia) Belogorie Belgorod	21,950	5,150	3,400	4,390	
3	(Germany) Berlin Recycling Volleys	21,773	5,400	3,462	4,355	
4	(Poland) Asseco Resovia Rzeszów	16,220	4,258	3,752	4,055	
5	(Italy) Azimut Modena	18,336	4,407	3,208	3,667	
6	(Italy) Sir Sicoma Colussi Perugia	9,923	3,932	2,813	3,308	
7	(Russia) Zenit Kazan	15,750	4,450	1,950	3,150	
8	(Italy) Cucine Lube Civitanova	15,276	3,821	2,320	3,055	
9	(Russia) Dinamo Moscow	12,900	3.100	2,000	2,580	
10	(Germany) VfB Friedrichshafen	7,004	2,709	1,940	2,335	
11	(Poland) Zaksa Kędzierzyn-Koźle	8,950	3,000	1,400	2,238	
12	(Czech Republic) Dukla Liberec	6,365	2,180	2,035	2,122	
13	(Turkey) Halkbank Ankara	6,182	4,320	750	2,061	
14	(Belgium) Knack Roeselare	7,810	2,200	1,750	1,953	
15	(Turkey) Arkas Izmir	7,700	2,100	1,700	1,925	
16	(Belgium) Noliko Maaseik	5,220	1,950	1,520	1,740	
17	(Romania) SCM U Craiova	5,000	2,585	1,200	1,667	
18	(France) Paris Volley	4,931	2,680	751	1,644	
19	(Slovenia) ACH Volley Ljubljana	3,580	1,530	800	1,193	
20	(Turkey) Istanbul BBSK	3,594	1,370	200	899	
	League total	262,064	11,500	200	2,718	
