= Vladimir Alekno =

Russian volleyball player and coach (born 1966)

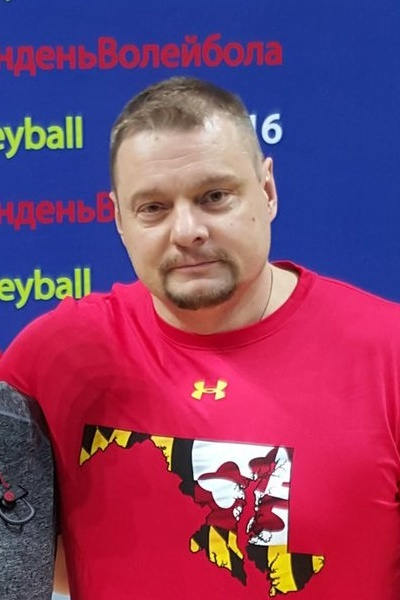
- Valdimer Alekno portrait

Personal information
- Full name: Vladimir Romanovich Alekno
- Nationality: Russian
- Born: December 4, 1966 (age 59) Polotsk, Byelorussian SSR, USSR
- Height: 1.96 m (6 ft 5 in)

Coaching information
- Previous teams coached
- Years: Teams
- 1999–2004 2004–2007 2007–2008 2008–2020 2010–2012 2015–2016 2020–2021: Tours VB; Dinamo Moscow; Russia; Zenit Kazan; Russia; Russia; Iran

Volleyball information
- Position: Middle blocker

Career
- Years: Team
- 1984–1987 1987–1990 1990–1991 1992–1993 1993–1994 1994–1996 1996–1999: CSKA Moscow; SKA Minsk; Levski Sofia; Voluntas Asti; Marconi Spoleto; AS Cannes VB; Tours VB

National team
- Years: Team
- –: Russia
Honours
Men's volleyball
Representing Russia
World Cup
Gold medal – first place	1999 Japan
European Championship
Silver medal – second place	1999 Austria
Bronze medal – third place	1993 Finland
World League
Silver medal – second place	1993 São Paulo
Silver medal – second place	1998 Milan
Bronze medal – third place	1996 Rotterdam
Bronze medal – third place	1997 Moscow
- Updated on 28 December 2017

Vladimir Romanovich Alekno (Russian: Владимир Романович Алекно; born in Polotsk on 4 December 1966) is a former Russian volleyball player and current volleyball coach.

Alekno's volleyball career started in 1984 in the SKA Minsk. Alekno coached the Russian national volleyball team in 2007-2008 and 2011–2012. Under his leadership, the Russian players won the gold medal in 2012 and the bronze medal in 2008 at the Summer Olympic Games. Also, they won the World League and the World Cup, both times in 2011.

In 2020, Alekno was announced as head coach of the Iran national volleyball team.

He publicly supported Russian invasion of Ukraine, calling for participation in supplying one of the Russian army units. Vladimir Alekno was brought to the Ukrainian Mirotvorets list as an accomplice in the crimes of the Russian authorities against Ukraine and its citizens.

== Early life ==
Alekno was born on 4 December 1966, in Polotsk, Vitebsk Voblast, to a Belarusian mother and a Lithuanian father.

== Awards ==
=== Individual ===
- 2013 Order of Honour
- 2019 Order of Friendship
