= 2015–16 CEV Champions League =

- League: CEV Champions League
- Sport: Volleyball
- Duration: 4 November 2015 – 17 April 2016
- Teams: 28

Finals
- Venue: (Poland) Kraków
- Champions: (Russia) Zenit Kazan
- Finals MVP: (Cuba) Wilfredo León

CEV Champions League seasons
- ← 2014–15 2016–17 →

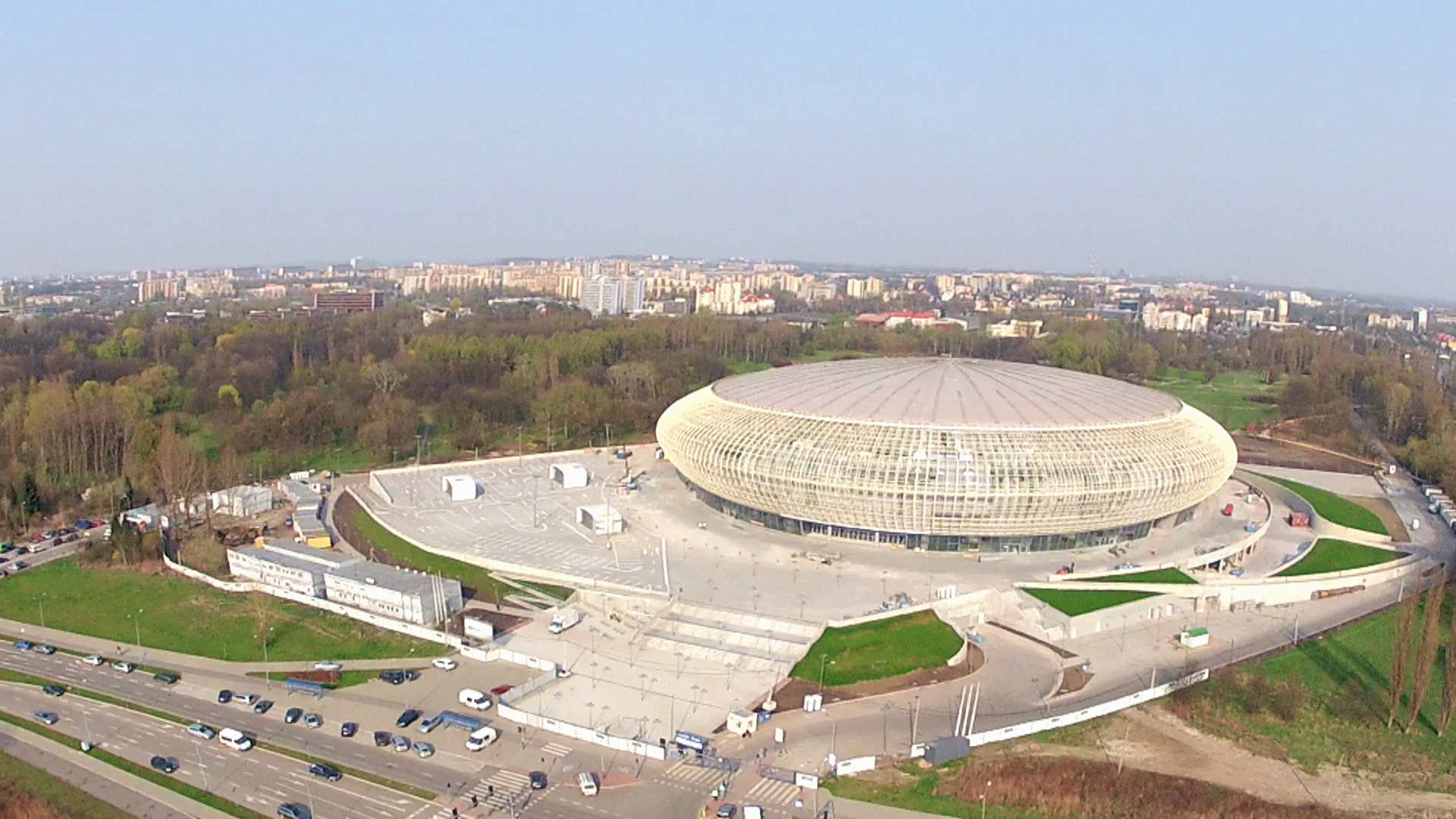
Krakow Arena

The 2015–16 CEV Champions League was the 57th edition of the highest level European volleyball club competition organised by the European Volleyball Confederation.

== Participating teams ==
Rank	Country	Number of teams	Teams
1	Russia	3	Zenit Kazan; Belogorie Belgorod; Dynamo Moscow
2	Italy	3	Diatec Trentino; DHL Modena; Cucine Lube Civitanova
3	Poland	3	Asseco Resovia; Lotos Trefl Gdańsk; PGE Skra Bełchatów
4	Turkey	3	Arkas İzmir; Halkbank Ankara; Ziraat Bankası Ankara
5	Belgium	3	Knack Roeselare; Volley Asse-Lennik; Noliko Maaseik
6	France	2	Tours VB; Paris Volley
7	Germany	2	VfB Friedrichshafen; Berlin Recycling Volleys
8	Romania	1	Tomis Constanța
9	Greece	1	PAOK Thessaloniki
10	Czech Republic	1	Dukla Liberec
11	Austria	1	Hypo Tirol Innsbruck
12	Slovenia	1	ACH Volley Ljubljana
13	Bulgaria	1	Marek Union-Ivkoni Dupnitsa
14	Switzerland	1	#Dragons Lugano
15	Montenegro	1	Budvanska Rivijera Budva
16	Serbia	1	Vojvodina NS Seme Novi Sad

== Format ==
=== League round ===
28 teams have been drawn to 7 pools of 4 teams each.

In each pool, the competition is organised on the basis of a double round-robin system. Each team will thus play 6 matches: twice against each opponent.

In the League Round, the placing of the teams is determined by the number of matches won.

In case of a tie in the number of matches won by two or more teams, they will be ranked on the basis of the following criteria:

- match points;
- set quotient (the number of total sets won divided by the number of total sets lost);
- points quotient (the number of total points scored divided by the number of total points lost);
- results of head-to-head matches between the teams in question.

Match points are awarded as follows:

- 3 points for a 3:0 or 3:1 victory;
- 2 points for a 3:2 victory;
- 1 point for a 2:3 defeat;
- 0 points for a 1:3 or 0:3 defeat.

12 teams will qualify for the Playoff 12:

- the winner of each pool, and
- 5 second-ranked teams with the best score.

After the end of the League Round, the organizer of the Final Four will be determined. That team will qualify directly for the Final Four. It will be replaced in Playoff 12 by the next best second-ranked team.

The remaining second-ranked team as well 3 third-ranked teams with the best score will move to the Challenge Round of the CEV Cup.

The remaining third-ranked and all fourth-ranked teams will be eliminated.

=== Playoffs ===
The playoffs will consist of two rounds: Playoff 12 and Playoff 6. Each round is played in two legs.

If the teams are tied after two legs, a "Golden Set" is played. The winner is the team that first obtains 15 points, provided that the points difference between the two teams is at least 2 points (thus, the Golden Set is similar to a tiebreak set in a normal match).

At each leg, points are awarded to the teams in the same manner as in the Group Round (3 for 3:0 or 3:1, 2 for 3:2 etc.). So, if team A defeat team B in the first leg 3:0 and lose in the second leg 1:3, team A does not advance to the next round (as it would have been expected on the basis of analogy with football competitions), but the two teams are tied with 3 points each, and a Golden Set is played.

The three teams that win in Playoff 6 round advance to the Final Four along with the organizer of the Final Four.

== Pools composition ==
The drawing of lots was held in Vienna, Austria on 2 July 2015. The 28 participated teams of the competition were divided by 4 pots based on the latest European Cups Ranking List and their National Rankings. Exception, the teams which received wild cards had to be in the 4th pot.

Pool A	Pool B	Pool C	Pool D
(Russia) Belogorie Belgorod	(Russia) Dynamo Moscow	(Italy) Diatec Trentino	(Russia) Zenit Kazan
(Turkey) Arkas İzmir	(France) Paris Volley	(France) Tours VB	(Turkey) Halkbank Ankara
(Germany) Berlin Recycling Volleys	(Germany) VfB Friedrichshafen	(Greece) PAOK Thessaloniki	(Austria) Hypo Tirol Innsbruck
(Bulgaria) Marek Union-Ivkoni Dupnitsa	(Turkey) Ziraat Bankası Ankara	(Belgium) Noliko Maaseik	(Montenegro) Budvanska Rivijera Budva

Pool E	Pool F	Pool G
(Italy) Cucine Lube Civitanova	(Italy) DHL Modena	(Poland) Asseco Resovia
(Belgium) Knack Roeselare	(Poland) Lotos Trefl Gdańsk	(Belgium) Volley Asse-Lennik
(Czech Republic) Dukla Liberec	(Slovenia) ACH Volley Ljubljana	(Romania) Tomis Constanța
(Poland) PGE Skra Bełchatów	(Serbia) Vojvodina NS Seme Novi Sad	(Switzerland) #Dragons Lugano

== League round ==
- All times are local.

=== Pool A ===
Pos	Team	Pld	W	L	Pts	SW	SL	SR	SPW	SPL	SPR	Qualification
1	(Russia) Belogorie Belgorod	6	5	1	15	15	4	3.750	395	373	1.059	Playoffs
2	(Turkey) Arkas İzmir	6	4	2	12	14	9	1.556	516	408	1.265	Playoffs
3	(Germany) Berlin Recycling Volleys	6	3	3	9	12	11	1.091	502	492	1.020	2015–16 CEV Cup
4	(Bulgaria) Marek Union-Ivkoni Dupnitsa	6	0	6	0	1	18	0.056	333	473	0.704	

Date	Time		Score		Set 1	Set 2	Set 3	Set 4	Set 5	Total	Report
4 Nov	18:00	Marek Union-Ivkoni (Bulgaria)	0–3	(Russia) Belogorie Belgorod	15–25	15–25	17–25			47–75	Report
4 Nov	19:30	Berlin Recycling Volleys (Germany)	2–3	(Turkey) Arkas İzmir	27–25	18–25	22–25	25–13	12–15	104–103	Report
17 Nov	19:00	Belogorie Belgorod (Russia)	3–0	(Germany) Berlin Recycling Volleys	25–18	25–17	26–24			76–59	Report
17 Nov	19:00	Arkas İzmir (Turkey)	3–1	(Bulgaria) Marek Union-Ivkoni	25–17	21–25	25–22	25–18		96–82	Report
2 Dec	19:00	Arkas İzmir (Turkey)	3–0	(Russia) Belogorie Belgorod	25–0	25–0	25–0			75–0	Report
2 Dec	19:30	Berlin Recycling Volleys (Germany)	3–0	(Bulgaria) Marek Union-Ivkoni	25–18	25–20	25–17			75–55	Report
16 Dec	19:00	Belogorie Belgorod (Russia)	3–0	(Turkey) Arkas İzmir	25–20	25–18	25–23			75–61	Report
16 Dec	18:30	Marek Union-Ivkoni (Bulgaria)	0–3	(Germany) Berlin Recycling Volleys	14–25	19–25	25–27			58–77	Report
20 Jan	18:30	Marek Union-Ivkoni (Bulgaria)	0–3	(Turkey) Arkas İzmir	15–25	19–25	16–25			50–75	Report
20 Jan	19:30	Berlin Recycling Volleys (Germany)	1–3	(Russia) Belogorie Belgorod	23–25	25–17	25–27	17–25		90–94	Report
26 Jan	19:00	Belogorie Belgorod (Russia)	3–0	(Bulgaria) Marek Union-Ivkoni	25–11	25–16	25–14			75–41	Report
26 Jan	19:00	Arkas İzmir (Turkey)	2–3	(Germany) Berlin Recycling Volleys	25–8	24–26	19–25	25–23	13–15	106–97	Report

=== Pool B ===
Pos	Team	Pld	W	L	Pts	SW	SL	SR	SPW	SPL	SPR	Qualification
1	(Turkey) Ziraat Bankası Ankara	6	5	1	15	15	6	2.500	503	389	1.293	Playoffs
2	(Russia) Dynamo Moscow	6	3	3	10	11	9	1.222	404	445	0.908	2015–16 CEV Cup
3	(Germany) VfB Friedrichshafen	6	2	4	6	8	12	0.667	441	465	0.948	
4	(France) Paris Volley	6	2	4	5	7	14	0.500	460	509	0.904	

Date	Time		Score		Set 1	Set 2	Set 3	Set 4	Set 5	Total	Report
3 Nov	19:00	Dynamo Moscow (Russia)	3–0	(Germany) VfB Friedrichshafen	25–16	25–20	25–16			75–52	Report
4 Nov	19:00	Ziraat Bankası Ankara (Turkey)	3–0	(France) Paris Volley	25–16	25–17	25–16			75–49	Report
18 Nov	20:00	VfB Friedrichshafen (Germany)	1–3	(Turkey) Ziraat Bankası Ankara	20–25	25–18	15–25	23–25		83–93	Report
1 Dec	20:30	Paris Volley (France)	3–0	(Germany) VfB Friedrichshafen	25–23	25–16	25–22			75–61	Report
2 Dec	19:00	Ziraat Bankası Ankara (Turkey)	3–0	(Russia) Dynamo Moscow	25–0	25–0	25–0			75–0	Report
8 Dec	20:00	Paris Volley (France)	3–2	(Russia) Dynamo Moscow	29–27	15–25	27–29	30–28	15–12	116–121	Report
16 Dec	20:00	VfB Friedrichshafen (Germany)	3–0	(France) Paris Volley	26–24	27–25	25–19			78–68	Report
17 Dec	19:00	Dynamo Moscow (Russia)	3–0	(Turkey) Ziraat Bankası Ankara	25–21	25–22	25–22			75–65	Report
20 Jan	19:00	Dynamo Moscow (Russia)	3–0	(France) Paris Volley	25–15	25–23	26–24			76–62	Report
21 Jan	19:00	Ziraat Bankası Ankara (Turkey)	3–1	(Germany) VfB Friedrichshafen	25–23	22–25	25–21	25–23		97–92	Report
26 Jan	20:00	VfB Friedrichshafen (Germany)	3–0	(Russia) Dynamo Moscow	25–22	25–22	25–13			75–57	Report
26 Jan	20:30	Paris Volley (France)	1–3	(Turkey) Ziraat Bankası Ankara	25–21	23–25	21–25	21–25		90–96	Report

=== Pool C ===
Pos	Team	Pld	W	L	Pts	SW	SL	SR	SPW	SPL	SPR	Qualification
1	(Italy) Diatec Trentino	6	5	1	16	17	4	4.250	502	415	1.210	Playoffs
2	(France) Tours VB	6	5	1	14	15	8	1.875	528	479	1.102	Playoffs
3	(Greece) PAOK Thessaloniki	6	1	5	3	6	16	0.375	474	537	0.883	
4	(Belgium) Noliko Maaseik	6	1	5	3	5	15	0.333	422	495	0.853	

Date	Time		Score		Set 1	Set 2	Set 3	Set 4	Set 5	Total	Report
4 Nov	20:30	Tours VB (France)	3–1	(Greece) PAOK Thessaloniki	25–20	21–25	25–17	25–16		96–78	Report
5 Nov	20:30	Diatec Trentino (Italy)	3–0	(Belgium) Noliko Maaseik	25–18	25–19	25–21			75–58	Report
18 Nov	19:00	PAOK Thessaloniki (Greece)	1–3	(Italy) Diatec Trentino	22–25	25–18	21–25	13–25		81–93	Report
18 Nov	20:30	Noliko Maaseik (Belgium)	1–3	(France) Tours VB	19–25	22–25	25–23	21–25		87–98	Report
1 Dec	20:30	Noliko Maaseik (Belgium)	3–0	(Greece) PAOK Thessaloniki	37–35	25–22	25–19			87–76	Report
2 Dec	20:30	Diatec Trentino (Italy)	3–0	(France) Tours VB	25–10	25–20	26–24			76–54	Report
16 Dec	19:00	PAOK Thessaloniki (Greece)	3–1	(Belgium) Noliko Maaseik	25–21	21–25	25–21	25–19		96–86	Report
16 Dec	20:30	Tours VB (France)	3–2	(Italy) Diatec Trentino	18–25	25–21	27–25	22–25	15–10	107–106	Report
19 Jan	20:30	Diatec Trentino (Italy)	3–0	(Greece) PAOK Thessaloniki	25–18	25–20	27–25			77–63	Report
20 Jan	20:30	Tours VB (France)	3–0	(Belgium) Noliko Maaseik	25–22	25–15	25–15			75–52	Report
26 Jan	19:00	PAOK Thessaloniki (Greece)	1–3	(France) Tours VB	18–25	21–25	25–23	16–25		80–98	Report
26 Jan	20:30	Noliko Maaseik (Belgium)	0–3	(Italy) Diatec Trentino	21–25	10–25	21–25			52–75	Report

=== Pool D ===
Pos	Team	Pld	W	L	Pts	SW	SL	SR	SPW	SPL	SPR	Qualification
1	(Russia) Zenit Kazan	6	6	0	18	18	1	18.000	486	376	1.293	Playoffs
2	(Turkey) Halkbank Ankara	6	4	2	11	13	9	1.444	503	482	1.044	Playoffs
3	(Austria) Hypo Tirol Innsbruck	6	2	4	6	9	14	0.643	516	537	0.961	
4	(Montenegro) Budvanska Rivijera Budva	6	0	6	1	2	18	0.111	375	485	0.773	

Date	Time		Score		Set 1	Set 2	Set 3	Set 4	Set 5	Total	Report
5 Nov	18:00	Budvanska Rivijera Budva (Montenegro)	0–3	(Turkey) Halkbank Ankara	20–25	20–25	26–28			66–78	Report
5 Nov	20:25	Hypo Tirol Innsbruck (Austria)	0–3	(Russia) Zenit Kazan	17–25	22–25	38–40			77–90	Report
18 Nov	19:00	Zenit Kazan (Russia)	3–0	(Montenegro) Budvanska Rivijera Budva	25–20	25–15	25–19			75–54	Report
18 Nov	19:00	Halkbank Ankara (Turkey)	3–2	(Austria) Hypo Tirol Innsbruck	23–25	25–21	30–32	25–21	15–12	118–111	Report
2 Dec	19:00	Zenit Kazan (Russia)	3–0	(Turkey) Halkbank Ankara	25–23	25–14	25–16			75–53	Report
3 Dec	20:25	Hypo Tirol Innsbruck (Austria)	3–0	(Montenegro) Budvanska Rivijera Budva	25–21	25–19	25–21			75–61	Report
16 Dec	19:00	Halkbank Ankara (Turkey)	1–3	(Russia) Zenit Kazan	25–21	21–25	23–25	14–25		83–96	Report
17 Dec	18:00	Budvanska Rivijera Budva (Montenegro)	2–3	(Austria) Hypo Tirol Innsbruck	25–19	22–25	25–23	20–25	5–15	97–107	Report
21 Jan	18:00	Budvanska Rivijera Budva (Montenegro)	0–3	(Russia) Zenit Kazan	17–25	16–25	17–25			50–75	Report
21 Jan	20:25	Hypo Tirol Innsbruck (Austria)	1–3	(Turkey) Halkbank Ankara	22–25	25–21	21–25	19–25		87–96	Report
26 Jan	19:00	Zenit Kazan (Russia)	3–0	(Austria) Hypo Tirol Innsbruck	25–16	25–22	25–21			75–59	Report
26 Jan	19:00	Halkbank Ankara (Turkey)	3–0	(Montenegro) Budvanska Rivijera Budva	25–15	25–16	25–16			75–47	Report

=== Pool E ===
Pos	Team	Pld	W	L	Pts	SW	SL	SR	SPW	SPL	SPR	Qualification
1	(Italy) Cucine Lube Civitanova	6	5	1	15	16	5	3.200	512	459	1.115	Playoffs
2	(Poland) PGE Skra Bełchatów	6	4	2	12	13	7	1.857	480	431	1.114	Playoffs
3	(Belgium) Knack Roeselare	6	3	3	9	11	12	0.917	516	521	0.990	2015–16 CEV Cup
4	(Czech Republic) Dukla Liberec	6	0	6	0	2	18	0.111	399	496	0.804	

Date	Time		Score		Set 1	Set 2	Set 3	Set 4	Set 5	Total	Report
4 Nov	20:30	Cucine Lube Civitanova (Italy)	3–1	(Belgium) Knack Roeselare	25–18	25–18	24–26	25–17		99–79	Report
5 Nov	18:00	Dukla Liberec (Czech Republic)	0–3	(Poland) PGE Skra Bełchatów	16–25	22–25	19–25			57–75	Report
17 Nov	20:30	Knack Roeselare (Belgium)	3–1	(Czech Republic) Dukla Liberec	22–25	25–17	25–22	25–22		97–86	Report
18 Nov	18:00	PGE Skra Bełchatów (Poland)	1–3	(Italy) Cucine Lube Civitanova	28–30	25–18	21–25	20–25		94–98	Report
1 Dec	18:00	PGE Skra Bełchatów (Poland)	3–0	(Belgium) Knack Roeselare	25–23	27–25	25–18			77–66	Report
3 Dec	18:00	Dukla Liberec (Czech Republic)	0–3	(Italy) Cucine Lube Civitanova	18–25	24–26	15–25			57–76	Report
15 Dec	20:30	Knack Roeselare (Belgium)	1–3	(Poland) PGE Skra Bełchatów	19–25	15–25	25–21	14–25		73–96	Report
16 Dec	20:30	Cucine Lube Civitanova (Italy)	3–0	(Czech Republic) Dukla Liberec	25–20	25–23	25–20			75–63	Report
20 Jan	20:30	Cucine Lube Civitanova (Italy)	3–0	(Poland) PGE Skra Bełchatów	25–16	33–31	25–16			83–63	Report
21 Jan	18:00	Dukla Liberec (Czech Republic)	1–3	(Belgium) Knack Roeselare	20–25	18–25	25–23	19–25		82–98	Report
26 Jan	18:00	PGE Skra Bełchatów (Poland)	3–0	(Czech Republic) Dukla Liberec	25–18	25–17	25–19			75–54	Report
26 Jan	20:30	Knack Roeselare (Belgium)	3–1	(Italy) Cucine Lube Civitanova	28–30	25–19	25–15	25–17		103–81	Report

=== Pool F ===
Pos	Team	Pld	W	L	Pts	SW	SL	SR	SPW	SPL	SPR	Qualification
1	(Italy) DHL Modena	6	5	1	16	17	3	5.667	493	386	1.277	Playoffs
2	(Poland) Lotos Trefl Gdańsk	6	5	1	14	15	6	2.500	484	433	1.118	Playoffs
3	(Serbia) Vojvodina NS Seme Novi Sad	6	1	5	3	5	15	0.333	404	481	0.840	
4	(Slovenia) ACH Volley Ljubljana	6	1	5	3	3	16	0.188	387	468	0.827	

Date	Time		Score		Set 1	Set 2	Set 3	Set 4	Set 5	Total	Report
3 Nov	18:00	Lotos Trefl Gdańsk (Poland)	3–0	(Serbia) Vojvodina NS Seme Novi Sad	25–18	25–16	25–19			75–53	Report
5 Nov	18:00	ACH Volley Ljubljana (Slovenia)	0–3	(Italy) DHL Modena	25–27	17–25	17–25			59–77	Report
18 Nov	20:00	Vojvodina NS Seme Novi Sad (Serbia)	3–0	(Slovenia) ACH Volley Ljubljana	25–22	25–21	25–19			75–62	Report
19 Nov	20:30	DHL Modena (Italy)	3–0	(Poland) Lotos Trefl Gdańsk	25–16	30–28	25–12			80–56	Report
3 Dec	18:00	ACH Volley Ljubljana (Slovenia)	0–3	(Poland) Lotos Trefl Gdańsk	18–25	17–25	14–25			49–75	Report
3 Dec	20:30	DHL Modena (Italy)	3–0	(Serbia) Vojvodina NS Seme Novi Sad	25–6	25–14	27–25			77–45	Report
16 Dec	20:00	Vojvodina NS Seme Novi Sad (Serbia)	0–3	(Italy) DHL Modena	21–25	22–25	14–25			57–75	Report
17 Dec	18:00	Lotos Trefl Gdańsk (Poland)	3–0	(Slovenia) ACH Volley Ljubljana	25–19	25–17	25–23			75–59	Report
21 Jan	18:00	Lotos Trefl Gdańsk (Poland)	3–2	(Italy) DHL Modena	25–22	21–25	26–24	22–25	15–13	109–109	Report
21 Jan	18:00	ACH Volley Ljubljana (Slovenia)	3–1	(Serbia) Vojvodina NS Seme Novi Sad	19–25	25–21	29–27	25–18		98–91	Report
26 Jan	20:00	Vojvodina NS Seme Novi Sad (Serbia)	1–3	(Poland) Lotos Trefl Gdańsk	20–25	21–25	25–19	17–25		83–94	Report
26 Jan	20:30	DHL Modena (Italy)	3–0	(Slovenia) ACH Volley Ljubljana	25–20	25–23	25–17			75–60	Report

=== Pool G ===
Pos	Team	Pld	W	L	Pts	SW	SL	SR	SPW	SPL	SPR	Qualification
1	(Poland) Asseco Resovia	6	6	0	18	18	1	18.000	472	298	1.584	Qualified as hosts for the Final Four
2	(Belgium) Volley Asse-Lennik	6	4	2	10	13	10	1.300	505	437	1.156	Playoffs
3	(Switzerland) #Dragons Lugano	6	2	4	7	8	12	0.667	427	457	0.934	2015–16 CEV Cup
4	(Romania) Tomis Constanța	6	0	6	1	2	18	0.111	276	488	0.566	

Date	Time		Score		Set 1	Set 2	Set 3	Set 4	Set 5	Total	Report
4 Nov	18:00	Asseco Resovia (Poland)	3–0	(Switzerland) #Dragons Lugano	25–16	25–17	25–19			75–52	Report
5 Nov	20:30	Volley Asse-Lennik (Belgium)	3–2	(Romania) Tomis Constanța	28–26	23–25	25–13	21–25	15–10	112–99	Report
17 Nov	18:00	Tomis Constanța (Romania)	0–3	(Poland) Asseco Resovia	20–25	19–25	21–25			60–75	Report
19 Nov	19:30	#Dragons Lugano (Switzerland)	2–3	(Belgium) Volley Asse-Lennik	28–26	24–26	25–23	22–25	8–15	107–115	Report
2 Dec	18:00	Asseco Resovia (Poland)	3–0	(Belgium) Volley Asse-Lennik	25–16	25–18	25–18			75–52	Report
3 Dec	19:30	#Dragons Lugano (Switzerland)	3–0	(Romania) Tomis Constanța	26–24	25–23	25–22			76–69	Report
17 Dec	18:00	Tomis Constanța (Romania)	0–3	(Switzerland) #Dragons Lugano	18–25	8–25	22–25			48–75	Report
17 Dec	20:30	Volley Asse-Lennik (Belgium)	1–3	(Poland) Asseco Resovia	25–21	13–25	24–26	14–25		76–97	Report
20 Jan	20:30	Asseco Resovia (Poland)	3–0	(Romania) Tomis Constanța	25–0	25–0	25–0			75–0	Report
21 Jan	20:30	Volley Asse-Lennik (Belgium)	3–0	(Switzerland) #Dragons Lugano	25–17	25–22	25–20			75–59	Report
26 Jan	18:00	Tomis Constanța (Romania)	0–3	(Belgium) Volley Asse-Lennik	0–25	0–25	0–25			0–75	Report
26 Jan	19:30	#Dragons Lugano (Switzerland)	0–3	(Poland) Asseco Resovia	23–25	17–25	18–25			58–75	Report

=== Second and third place ranking ===
The first 7 teams are 2nd placed teams. The other teams are 3rd placed teams.

Pos	Team	Pld	W	L	Pts	SW	SL	SR	SPW	SPL	SPR	Qualification
1	(Poland) Lotos Trefl Gdańsk	6	5	1	14	15	6	2.500	484	433	1.118	Playoffs
2	(France) Tours VB	6	5	1	14	15	8	1.875	528	479	1.102	Playoffs
3	(Poland) PGE Skra Bełchatów	6	4	2	12	13	7	1.857	480	431	1.114	Playoffs
4	(Turkey) Arkas İzmir	6	4	2	12	14	9	1.556	516	408	1.265	Playoffs
5	(Turkey) Halkbank Ankara	6	4	2	11	13	9	1.444	503	482	1.044	Playoffs
6	(Belgium) Volley Asse-Lennik	6	4	2	10	13	10	1.300	505	437	1.156	Playoffs
7	(Russia) Dynamo Moscow	6	3	3	10	11	9	1.222	404	445	0.908	2015–16 CEV Cup
8	(Germany) Berlin Recycling Volleys	6	3	3	9	12	11	1.091	502	492	1.020	2015–16 CEV Cup
9	(Belgium) Knack Roeselare	6	3	3	9	11	12	0.917	516	521	0.990	2015–16 CEV Cup
10	(Switzerland) #Dragons Lugano	6	2	4	7	8	12	0.667	427	457	0.934	2015–16 CEV Cup
11	(Germany) VfB Friedrichshafen	6	2	4	6	8	12	0.667	441	465	0.948	
12	(Austria) Hypo Tirol Innsbruck	6	2	4	6	9	14	0.643	516	537	0.961	
13	(Greece) PAOK Thessaloniki	6	1	5	3	6	16	0.375	474	537	0.883	
14	(Serbia) Vojvodina NS Seme Novi Sad	6	1	5	3	5	15	0.333	404	481	0.840	

== Playoffs ==
Pool	Winners	Second place
A	(Russia) Belogorie Belgorod	(Turkey) Arkas İzmir
B	(Turkey) Ziraat Bankası Ankara	
C	(Italy) Diatec Trentino	(France) Tours VB
D	(Russia) Zenit Kazan	(Turkey) Halkbank Ankara
E	(Italy) Cucine Lube Civitanova	(Poland) PGE Skra Bełchatów
F	(Italy) DHL Modena	(Poland) Lotos Trefl Gdańsk
G	(Poland) Asseco Resovia (F4 Hosts)	(Belgium) Volley Asse-Lennik

- All times are local.

=== Playoff 12 ===
Team 1	Agg.	Team 2	1st leg	2nd leg
PGE Skra Bełchatów (Poland)	4–2	(Turkey) Ziraat Bankası Ankara	3–1	2–3
Lotos Trefl Gdańsk (Poland)	0–6	(Russia) Zenit Kazan	1–3	0–3
Tours VB (France)	2–4	(Russia) Belogorie Belgorod	0–3	3–2
Volley Asse-Lennik (Belgium)	1–5	(Italy) Diatec Trentino	2–3	0–3
Arkas İzmir (Turkey)	0–6	(Italy) Cucine Lube Civitanova	0–3	1–3
Halkbank Ankara (Turkey)	4–2	(Italy) DHL Modena	3–0	2–3

==== First leg ====
Date	Time		Score		Set 1	Set 2	Set 3	Set 4	Set 5	Total	Report
17 Feb	18:00	PGE Skra Bełchatów (Poland)	3–1	(Turkey) Ziraat Bankası Ankara	25–19	25–27	25–20	27–25		102–91	Report
16 Feb	20:00	Lotos Trefl Gdańsk (Poland)	1–3	(Russia) Zenit Kazan	19–25	25–22	17–25	15–25		76–97	Report
17 Feb	20:30	Tours VB (France)	0–3	(Russia) Belogorie Belgorod	19–25	16–25	23–25			58–75	Report
17 Feb	20:30	Volley Asse-Lennik (Belgium)	2–3	(Italy) Diatec Trentino	25–23	17–25	22–25	25–21	13–15	102–109	Report
16 Feb	19:00	Arkas İzmir (Turkey)	0–3	(Italy) Cucine Lube Civitanova	20–25	21–25	19–25			60–75	Report
17 Feb	17:30	Halkbank Ankara (Turkey)	3–0	(Italy) DHL Modena	25–20	25–21	25–13			75–54	Report

==== Second leg ====
Date	Time		Score		Set 1	Set 2	Set 3	Set 4	Set 5	Total	Report
2 Mar	19:00	Ziraat Bankası Ankara (Turkey)	3–2	(Poland) PGE Skra Bełchatów	20–25	13–25	28–26	28–26	15–10	104–112	Report
2 Mar	20:00	Zenit Kazan (Russia)	3–0	(Poland) Lotos Trefl Gdańsk	25–19	25–16	25–22			75–57	Report
2 Mar	18:00	Belogorie Belgorod (Russia)	2–3	(France) Tours VB	23–25	25–22	25–20	17–25	13–15	103–107	Report
3 Mar	20:30	Diatec Trentino (Italy)	3–0	(Belgium) Volley Asse-Lennik	25–18	25–23	25–19			75–60	Report
2 Mar	20:30	Cucine Lube Civitanova (Italy)	3–1	(Turkey) Arkas İzmir	25–14	23–25	25–18	32–30		105–87	Report
3 Mar	20:30	DHL Modena (Italy)	3–2	(Turkey) Halkbank Ankara	22–25	25–20	25–21	17–25	15–9	104–100	Report

=== Playoff 6 ===
Team 1	Agg.	Team 2	1st leg	2nd leg	Golden Set
Zenit Kazan (Russia)	4–2	(Poland) PGE Skra Bełchatów	2–3	3–0	
Diatec Trentino (Italy)	5–1	(Russia) Belogorie Belgorod	3–0	3–2	
Cucine Lube Civitanova (Italy)	3–3	(Turkey) Halkbank Ankara	3–2	2–3	17–15

==== First leg ====
Date	Time		Score		Set 1	Set 2	Set 3	Set 4	Set 5	Total	Report
16 Mar	19:30	Zenit Kazan (Russia)	2–3	(Poland) PGE Skra Bełchatów	25–23	25–21	23–25	25–27	16–18	114–114	Report
17 Mar	20:30	Diatec Trentino (Italy)	3–0	(Russia) Belogorie Belgorod	25–20	25–17	28–26			78–63	Report
17 Mar	20:30	Cucine Lube Civitanova (Italy)	3–2	(Turkey) Halkbank Ankara	21–25	21–25	25–17	25–18	15–11	107–96	Report

==== Second leg ====
Date	Time		Score		Set 1	Set 2	Set 3	Set 4	Set 5	Total	Report
24 Mar	18:00	PGE Skra Bełchatów (Poland)	0–3	(Russia) Zenit Kazan	19–25	23–25	19–25			61–75	Report
22 Mar	19:00	Belogorie Belgorod (Russia)	2–3	(Italy) Diatec Trentino	17–25	25–21	23–25	25–22	14–16	104–109	Report
23 Mar	17:30	Halkbank Ankara (Turkey)	3–2	(Italy) Cucine Lube Civitanova	27–29	26–24	25–22	20–25	15–13	113–113	Report
Golden set		Halkbank Ankara (Turkey)	15–17	(Italy) Cucine Lube Civitanova							

== Final Four ==
- Organizer: (Poland) Asseco Resovia
- Place: Kraków
- All times are Central European Summer Time (UTC+02:00).

Semifinals
16 April
(Russia) Zenit Kazan	3
(Poland) Asseco Resovia	1
16 April
(Italy) Diatec Trentino	3
(Italy) Cucine Lube Civitanova	0

Final
17 April
(Russia) Zenit Kazan	3
(Italy) Diatec Trentino	2
3rd place match
17 April
(Poland) Asseco Resovia	2
(Italy) Cucine Lube Civitanova	3

=== Semifinals ===
Date	Time		Score		Set 1	Set 2	Set 3	Set 4	Set 5	Total	Report
16 Apr	16:30	Zenit Kazan (Russia)	3–1	(Poland) Asseco Resovia	22–25	26–24	25–18	25–21		98–88	Report
16 Apr	19:30	Diatec Trentino (Italy)	3–0	(Italy) Cucine Lube Civitanova	25–19	25–20	25–18			75–57	Report

=== 3rd place match ===
Date	Time		Score		Set 1	Set 2	Set 3	Set 4	Set 5	Total	Report
17 Apr	14:45	Asseco Resovia (Poland)	2–3	(Italy) Cucine Lube Civitanova	20–25	27–25	25–22	22–25	10–15	104–112	Report

=== Final ===
Date	Time		Score		Set 1	Set 2	Set 3	Set 4	Set 5	Total	Report
17 Apr	18:00	Zenit Kazan (Russia)	3–2	(Italy) Diatec Trentino	23–25	22–25	25–17	27–25	15–13	112–105	Report

== Final standings ==
Qualified for the 2016 FIVB Club World Championship

Rank	Team
1st place, gold medalist(s)	(Russia) Zenit Kazan
2nd place, silver medalist(s)	(Italy) Diatec Trentino
3rd place, bronze medalist(s)	(Italy) Cucine Lube Civitanova
4	(Poland) Asseco Resovia

2015–16 CEV Champions League winners
(Russia)
Zenit Kazan
4th title

== Awards ==
- Most valuable player
  (Cuba) Wilfredo León (Zenit Kazan)
- Best setter
  (Italy) Simone Giannelli (Diatec Trentino)
- Best outside spikers
  (Slovenia) Tine Urnaut (Diatec Trentino)
  (Cuba) Wilfredo León (Zenit Kazan)
- Best middle blockers
  (Argentina) Sebastián Solé (Diatec Trentino)
  (United States) Russell Holmes (Asseco Resovia)
- Best opposite spiker
  (Russia) Maxim Mikhaylov (Zenit Kazan)
- Best libero
  (France) Jenia Grebennikov (Cucine Lube Civitanova)
