= VC Zenit-Kazan =

Russian volleyball club

Zenit-Kazan
- Full name: Volleyball Club "Zenit-Kazan"
- Founded: 2000
- Ground: Kazan Volleyball Centre (Capacity: 4,570)
- Chairman: Rafkat Kantyukov
- Manager: Aleksey Verbov
- League: Super League
- 2022–23: 1st
- Website: Club home page

Uniforms
Home	Away

VC Zenit-Kazan (Russian: Зенит-Казань), until 2008 known as Dinamo Tattransgaz Kazan (Russian: Динамо-Таттрансгаз), is a professional men's volleyball team based in Kazan, Russia. It plays in the Super League (11-time champion).

== Achievements ==
=== International competitions ===
- CEV Champions League

Winners (6): 2008, 2012, 2015, 2016, 2017, 2018
Runners-up (2): 2011, 2019
Third place (1): 2013

- FIVB Club World Championship

Winners (1): 2017
Runners-up (2): 2015, 2016
Third place (3): 2009, 2011, 2019

Domestic competitions

- Russian Super League

Winners (12): 2007, 2009, 2010, 2011, 2012, 2014, 2015, 2016, 2017, 2018, 2023, 2024
Runners-up (2): 2019, 2020
Third place (5): 2004, 2005, 2008, 2013, 2022

- Russian Cup

Winners (11): 2004, 2007, 2009, 2014, 2015, 2016, 2017, 2018, 2019, 2021, 2022

- Russian SuperCup

Winners (9): 2010, 2011, 2012, 2015, 2016, 2017, 2018, 2020, 2023

== History ==
The club was founded on 13 May 2000 by the decision of Tatarstan Ministry of Internal Affairs and Kazan City Administration. It was formed at the base of Directorate of Internal Affairs and aimed at taking part in games of Russian Championship First League.

== Team roster ==
Team roster - season 2021/2022

No.	Name	Date of birth	Position
1	(Russia) Roman Poroshin	23 August 1995 (age 30)	setter
3	(Russia) Andrey Surmachevskiy	22 June 1996 (age 29)	outside hitter
4	(Russia) Artem Volvich	22 January 1990 (age 35)	middle blocker
7	(Russia) Aleksandr Volkov (C)	14 February 1985 (age 40)	middle blocker
9	(Russia) Yury Berezhko	27 January 1984 (age 41)	outside hitter
10	(Poland) Bartosz Bednorz	25 July 1994 (age 31)	outside hitter
11	(United States) Micah Christenson	8 May 1993 (age 32)	setter
12	(Russia) Dmitry Shcherbinin	10 September 1989 (age 36)	middle blocker
13	(Russia) Alexey Kononov	9 April 1997 (age 28)	middle blocker
15	(Russia) Dmitry Volkov	25 May 1995 (age 30)	outside hitter
17	(Russia) Valentin Golubev	3 May 1992 (age 33)	libero
18	(Russia) Maxim Mikhaylov	19 March 1988 (age 37)	opposite
20	(Russia) Ilia Fedorov	1 August 2002 (age 23)	libero
22	(Russia) Denis Zemtchenok	11 August 1987 (age 38)	opposite
24	(Russia) Mikhail Labinskii	21 April 2003 (age 22)	outside hitter
Head coach: (Russia) Aleksey Verbov

Team roster – season 2020/2021
VC Zenit-Kazan
No.	Name	Date of birth	Position
2	(Russia) Fedor Voronkov	10 December 1995 (age 29)	outside hitter
3	(Russia) Andrey Surmachevskiy	22 June 1996 (age 29)	outside hitter
4	(Russia) Artem Volvich	22 January 1990 (age 35)	middle blocker
5	(Russia) Laurent Alekno	18 September 1996 (age 29)	setter
7	(Russia) Aleksandr Volkov	14 February 1985 (age 40)	middle blocker
9	(France) Earvin N'Gapeth	12 February 1991 (age 34)	outside hitter
10	(Poland) Bartosz Bednorz	25 July 1994 (age 31)	outside hitter
11	(Russia) Valentin Krotkov	1 September 1991 (age 34)	libero
12	(Russia) Alexander Butko (C)	18 March 1986 (age 39)	setter
13	(Russia) Alexey Kononov	9 April 1997 (age 28)	middle blocker
15	(Russia) Denis Zemtchenok	11 August 1987 (age 38)	opposite
16	(Russia) Artem Smoliar	4 February 1985 (age 40)	middle blocker
17	(Russia) Valentin Golubev	3 May 1992 (age 33)	libero
18	(Russia) Maxim Mikhaylov	19 March 1988 (age 37)	opposite
Head coach: (Russia) Vladimir Alekno

Team roster – season 2019/2020
VC Zenit-Kazan
No.	Name	Date of birth	Position
2	(Bulgaria) Tsvetan Sokolov	31 December 1989 (age 35)	opposite
3	(Russia) Andrey Surmachevskiy	22 June 1996 (age 29)	outside hitter
4	(Russia) Artem Volvich	22 January 1990 (age 35)	middle blocker
5	(Russia) Laurent Alekno	18 September 1996 (age 29)	setter
7	(Russia) Vadim Likhosherstov	23 January 1989 (age 36)	middle blocker
8	(Russia) Nikita Alekseev	15 July 1992 (age 33)	opposite
9	(France) Earvin N'Gapeth	12 February 1991 (age 34)	outside hitter
10	(Russia) Alexey Kononov	9 April 1997 (age 28)	middle blocker
11	(Russia) Valentin Krotkov	1 September 1991 (age 34)	libero
12	(Russia) Alexander Butko	18 March 1986 (age 39)	setter
13	(Russia) Alexey Samoylenko	23 September 1985 (age 40)	middle blocker
15	(Russia) Alexey Spiridonov	26 June 1988 (age 37)	outside hitter
16	(Russia) Alexey Verbov	31 January 1982 (age 43)	libero
18	(Russia) Maxim Mikhaylov	19 March 1988 (age 37)	opposite
Head coach: (Russia) Vladimir Alekno

== Notable players ==
Notable, former or current players of the club, who are medalists of intercontinental tournaments in national teams or clubs.

- 2002–2006 (Russia) Ruslan Olikhver
- 2004–2007 (Russia) Igor Shulepov
- 2006–2007 (Russia) Vadim Khamuttskikh
- 2006–2010 (United States) Clay Stanley
- 2006–2011 (United States) Lloy Ball
- 2006–2008
  2009–2011 (Russia) Sergey Tetyukhin
- 2006–2008
  2010–2011 (Russia) Andrey Egorchev
- 2007–2008 (Russia) Aleksandr Gerasimov
- 2007–2009
  2011–2013 (Russia) Aleksey Obmochaev
- 2010–2012 (United States) William Priddy
- 2011–2013 (Italy) Valerio Vermiglio
- 2011–2015
  2020–present (Russia) Aleksandr Volkov
- 2013–2014 (Russia) Roman Yakovlev
- 2013–2014 (Poland) Łukasz Żygadło
- 2013–2014 (Serbia) Nikola Grbić
- 2014–2014 (France) Benjamin Toniutti
- 2014–2015 (Iran) Saeid Marouf
- 2007–2015 (Russia) Nikolay Apalikov
- 2009–2010
  2015–2020 (Russia) Aleksey Verbov
- 2014–2016
  2018–2020 (Russia) Aleksey Spiridonov
- 2010–present (Russia) Maxim Mikhaylov
- 2012–2019 (United States) Matthew Anderson
- 2014–2018 (Cuba) / (Poland) Wilfredo León
- 2014–2017 (Bulgaria) Teodor Salparov
- 2019–2020 (Bulgaria) Tsvetan Sokolov
- 2016–present (Russia) Aleksandr Butko
- 2018–2021 (France) Earvin N'Gapeth
- 2020–present (Poland) Bartosz Bednorz
- 2020–present (Russia) Valentin Golubev
- 2021–present (United States) Micah Christenson

== Stadium ==
Kazan Volleyball Centre is a modern complex with a total area of 13,000 square meters. The capacity of the main arena is 5,000 spectators, the small one 700. They have all the necessary support facilities and well-equipped gyms. The arena is located at Midhat Bulatov Street.

== Kit manufacturer ==
The table below shows the history of kit providers for the Zenit-Kazan team.

Period	Kit provider
2000–	Gala; Asics; Mikasa; Mizuno; Champion; Adidas; Erreà Ensen

=== Sponsorship ===
Primary sponsors include: main sponsors like Gazprom. Other sponsors: Ministry of Internal Affairs, Adidas, TNT, Blimp, Gazeta.ru, TFB Bank and Championat.com.
