= 2014–15 CEV Cup =

- League: CEV Cup
- Sport: Volleyball
- Duration: 4 November 2014 – 11 April 2015

Finals
- Champions: (Russia) Dinamo Moscow
- Runners-up: (Italy) Energy T.I. Diatec Trentino
- Finals MVP: (Russia) Pavel Kruglov (MOS)

CEV Cup seasons
- ← 2013–14 2015–16 →

The 2014–15 CEV Cup was the 43rd edition of the European CEV Cup volleyball club tournament.

In finals Dinamo Moscow beat Energy T.I. Diatec Trentino in golden set, after winning home match and compensation of losses after the first match. Russian opposite Pavel Kruglov from Dinamo Moscow was awarded Most Valuable Player title.

== Participating teams ==
The number of participants on the basis of ranking list for European Cup Competitions:

Rank	Country	Number of teams	Teams
1	Russia	1	Dinamo Moscow
2	Italy	1	Energy T.I. Diatec Trentino
3	Serbia	2	Partizan Vizura Beograd, Vojvodina NS Seme Novi Sad
4	Poland	1	ZAKSA Kędzierzyn-Koźle
5	Bulgaria	1	CVC Gabrovo
6	Germany	1	TV Ingersoll Bühl
7	France	2	GFC Ajaccio VB, Spacer's de Toulouse
8	Finland	3	Loimu Raisio, Kokkolan Tiikerit, VaLePa Sastamala
9	Belgium	1 +2	Volley behappy2 Asse-Lennik, Precura Antwerpen, Knack Randstad Roeselare
12	Czech Republic	3	VK Dukla Liberec, Fatra Zlín, Volejbal Brno
13	Turkey	2 +1	İstanbul BBSK, Arkas İzmir, Fenerbahçe SK Istanbul
14	Netherlands	2	Draisma Dynamo Apeldoorn, Landstede Zwolle
16	Spain	0 +1	CAI Teruel
18	Estonia	2	Bigbank Tartu, Selver Tallinn
21	Ukraine	2	Khimprom Sumy, Lokomotyv Kharkiv
23	Croatia	1	MOK Rovinj
27	Romania	2	Dinamo București, SCM U Craiova
28	Israel	1	Maccabi Tel Aviv
29	Hungary	1	Kecskeméti RC
33	Bosnia and Herzegovina	2	MOK Jedinstvo Brčko, OK Mladost Brčko
39	Switzerland	1	Biogas Volley Näfels

== Main phase ==
=== 16th Final ===
The 16 winning teams from the 16th Final competed in the 8th Final playing home & away matches. The losers of the 16th Final matches qualified for the main phase in Challenge Cup.

Team 1	Agg.	Team 2	1st leg	2nd leg	Golden Set
Vojvodina NS Seme Novi Sad (Serbia)	1–6	(Italy) Energy T.I. Diatec Trentino	1–3	0–3	
OK Mladost Brčko (Bosnia and Herzegovina)	4–6	(Israel) Maccabi Tel Aviv	2–3	2–3	
Partizan Vizura Beograd (Serbia)	3–5	(Romania) SCM U Craiova	3–2	0–3	
Kecskeméti RC (Hungary)	5–4	(Romania) Dinamo București	2–3	3–1	
Loimu Raisio (Finland)	1–6	(Belgium) Volley behappy2 Asse-Lennik	1–3	0–3	
Khimprom Sumy (Ukraine)	0–6	(Ukraine) Lokomotyv Kharkiv	0–3	0–3	
Draisma Dynamo Apeldoorn (Netherlands)	5–5	(Switzerland) Biogas Volley Näfels	3–2	2–3	15–13
İstanbul BBSK (Turkey)	6–2	(Czech Republic) Volejbal Brno	3–2	3–0	
Fatra Zlín (Czech Republic)	0–6	(Russia) Dinamo Moscow	0–3	0–3	
Landstede Zwolle (Netherlands)	6–0	(Croatia) MOK Rovinj	3–0	3–0	
Spacer's Toulouse VB (France)	6–0	(Czech Republic) VK Dukla Liberec	3–0	3–0	
TV Ingersoll Bühl (Germany)	6–1	(Estonia) Bigbank Tartu	3–1	3–0	
MOK Jedinstvo Brčko (Bosnia and Herzegovina)	0–6	(France) GFC Ajaccio	0–3	0–3	
CVC Gabrovo (Bulgaria)	0–6	(Turkey) Arkas İzmir	0–3	0–3	
VaLePa Sastamala (Finland)	6–1	(Estonia) Selver Tallinn	3–0	3–1	
ZAKSA Kędzierzyn-Koźle (Poland)	5–4	(Finland) Tiikerit Kokkola	3–1	2–3	

=== 8th Final ===
Team 1	Agg.	Team 2	1st leg	2nd leg
Energy T.I. Diatec Trentino (Italy)	6–0	(Israel) Maccabi Tel Aviv	3–0	3–0
Kecskeméti RC (Hungary)	0–6	(Romania) SCM U Craiova	0–3	0–3
Lokomotyv Kharkiv (Ukraine)	3–6	(Belgium) Volley behappy2 Asse-Lennik	2–3	1–3
Draisma Dynamo Apeldoorn (Netherlands)	1–6	(Turkey) İstanbul BBSK	1–3	0–3
Dinamo Moscow (Russia)	6–1	(Netherlands) Landstede Zwolle	3–0	3–1
Spacer's Toulouse VB (France)	6–1	(Germany) TV Ingersoll Bühl	3–0	3–1
GFC Ajaccio VB (France)	4–5	(Turkey) Arkas Izmir	3–2	1–3
ZAKSA Kędzierzyn-Koźle (Poland)	5–4	(Finland) VaLePa Sastamala	3–1	2–3

==== First leg ====
Date	Time		Score		Set 1	Set 2	Set 3	Set 4	Set 5	Total	Report
4 Dec	20:30	Energy T.I. Diatec Trentino (Italy)	3–0	(Israel) Maccabi Tel Aviv	25–16	25–12	25–20			75–48	Report
2 Dec	18:00	Kecskeméti RC (Hungary)	0–3	(Romania) SCM U Craiova	21–25	20–25	9–25			50–75	Report
16 Dec	20:30	Lokomotyv Kharkiv (Ukraine)	2–3	(Belgium) Volley behappy2 Asse-Lennik	20–25	25–21	25–22	16–25	12–15	98–108	Report
3 Dec	20:00	Draisma Dynamo Apeldoorn (Netherlands)	1–3	(Turkey) İstanbul BBSK	25–22	15–25	21–25	19–25		80–97	Report
3 Dec	19:00	Dinamo Moscow (Russia)	3–0	(Netherlands) Landstede Zwolle	25–17	25–19	25–14			75–50	Report
2 Dec	20:00	Spacer's Toulouse VB (France)	3–0	(Germany) TV Ingersoll Bühl	25–17	25–22	25–19			75–58	Report
4 Dec	20:15	GFC Ajaccio VB (France)	3–2	(Turkey) Arkas Izmir	25–21	21–25	28–26	14–25	15–12	103–109	Report
3 Dec	20:30	ZAKSA Kędzierzyn-Koźle (Poland)	3–1	(Finland) VaLePa Sastamala	27–25	23–25	25–23	25–22		100–95	Report

==== Second leg ====
Date	Time		Score		Set 1	Set 2	Set 3	Set 4	Set 5	Total	Report
17 Dec	19:00	Maccabi Tel Aviv (Israel)	0–3	(Italy) Energy T.I. Diatec Trentino	15–25	13–25	16–25			44–75	Report
16 Dec	19:30	SCM U Craiova (Romania)	3–0	(Hungary) Kecskeméti RC	25–16	26–24	25–18			76–58	Report
17 Dec	20:30	Volley behappy2 Asse-Lennik (Belgium)	3–1	(Ukraine) Lokomotyv Kharkiv	25–22	21–25	29–27	25–17		100–91	Report
17 Dec	17:00	İstanbul BBSK (Turkey)	3–0	(Netherlands) Draisma Dynamo Apeldoorn	25–15	25–19	25–19			75–53	Report
17 Dec	19:00	Landstede Zwolle (Netherlands)	1–3	(Russia) Dinamo Moscow	19–25	25–23	17–25	19–25		80–98	Report
17 Dec	19:30	TV Ingersoll Bühl (Germany)	1–3	(France) Spacer's Toulouse VB	22–25	30–28	17–25	23–25		92–103	Report
17 Dec	19:30	Arkas Izmir (Turkey)	3–1	(France) GFC Ajaccio VB	25–18	22–25	25–17	25–20		97–80	Report
18 Dec	18:30	VaLePa Sastamala (Finland)	3–2	(Poland) ZAKSA Kędzierzyn-Koźle	23–25	22–25	25–18	25–16	15–12	110–96	Report

=== 4th Final ===
Team 1	Agg.	Team 2	1st leg	2nd leg	Golden Set
SCM U Craiova (Romania)	1–6	(Italy) Energy T.I. Diatec Trentino	0–3	1–3	
İstanbul BBSK (Turkey)	0–6	(Belgium) Volley behappy2 Asse-Lennik	0–3	0–3	
Spacer's Toulouse VB (France)	2–6	(Russia) Dinamo Moscow	2–3	0–3	
ZAKSA Kędzierzyn-Koźle (Poland)	3–3	(Turkey) Arkas Izmir	3–0	0–3	15–10

==== First leg ====
Date	Time		Score		Set 1	Set 2	Set 3	Set 4	Set 5	Total	Report
13 Jan	17:30	SCM U Craiova (Romania)	0–3	(Italy) Energy T.I. Diatec Trentino	25–27	22–25	19–25			66–77	Report
14 Jan	20:30	İstanbul BBSK (Turkey)	0–3	(Belgium) Volley behappy2 Asse-Lennik	22–25	19–25	25–27			66–77	Report
13 Jan	20:00	Spacer's Toulouse VB (France)	2–3	(Russia) Dinamo Moscow	25–22	22–25	15–25	25–22	16–18	103–112	Report
15 Jan	18:00	ZAKSA Kędzierzyn-Koźle (Poland)	3–0	(Turkey) Arkas Izmir	25–23	27–25	25–17			77–65	Report

==== Second leg ====
Date	Time		Score		Set 1	Set 2	Set 3	Set 4	Set 5	Total	Report
22 Jan	20:30	Energy T.I. Diatec Trentino (Italy)	3–1	(Romania) SCM U Craiova	25–15	25–16	20–25	25–15		95–71	Report
21 Jan	20:30	Volley behappy2 Asse-Lennik (Belgium)	3–0	(Turkey) İstanbul BBSK	25–19	25–20	27–25			77–64	Report
21 Jan	19:00	Dinamo Moscow (Russia)	3–0	(France) Spacer's Toulouse VB	25–15	25–22	25–22			75–59	Report
22 Jan	19:30	Arkas Izmir (Turkey)	3–0	(Poland) ZAKSA Kędzierzyn-Koźle	25–20	27–25	25–16			77–61	Report
Golden set		Arkas Izmir (Turkey)	10–15	(Poland) ZAKSA Kędzierzyn-Koźle							

== Challenge phase ==
Team 1	Agg.	Team 2	1st leg	2nd leg	Golden Set
Volley behappy2 Asse-Lennik (Belgium)	4–3	(Belgium) Precura Antwerpen	3–0	1–3	18–16
Dinamo Moscow (Russia)	5–3	(Turkey) Fenerbahçe SK Istanbul	3–0	2–3	
Energy T.I. Diatec Trentino (Italy)	6–4	(Belgium) Knack Randstad Roeselare	3–2	3–2	
ZAKSA Kędzierzyn-Koźle (Poland)	6–1	(Spain) CAI Teruel	3–0	3–1	

=== First leg ===
Date	Time		Score		Set 1	Set 2	Set 3	Set 4	Set 5	Total	Report
4 Mar	20:30	Volley behappy2 Asse-Lennik (Belgium)	3–0	(Belgium) Precura Antwerpen	25–18	25–21	25–22			75–61	Report
4 Mar	19:00	Dinamo Moscow (Russia)	3–0	(Turkey) Fenerbahçe SK Istanbul	25–16	25–19	25–18			75–53	Report
5 Mar	20:30	Energy T.I. Diatec Trentino (Italy)	3–2	(Belgium) Knack Randstad Roeselare	25–22	25–18	19–25	24–26	15–11	108–102	Report
4 Mar	18:00	ZAKSA Kędzierzyn-Koźle (Poland)	3–0	(Spain) CAI Teruel	25–19	25–23	25–19			75–61	Report

=== Second leg ===
Date	Time		Score		Set 1	Set 2	Set 3	Set 4	Set 5	Total	Report
11 Mar	20:30	Precura Antwerpen (Belgium)	3–1	(Belgium) Volley behappy2 Asse-Lennik	25–13	22–25	25–22	25–22		97–82	Report
Golden set		Precura Antwerpen (Belgium)	16–18	(Belgium) Volley behappy2 Asse-Lennik							
11 Mar	18:00	Fenerbahçe SK Istanbul (Turkey)	3–2	(Russia) Dinamo Moscow	25–22	27–29	28–26	19–25	16–14	115–116	Report
11 Mar	20:30	Knack Randstad Roeselare (Belgium)	2–3	(Italy) Energy T.I. Diatec Trentino	16–25	25–17	25–19	20–25	6–15	92–101	Report
11 Mar	20:15	CAI Teruel (Spain)	1–3	(Poland) ZAKSA Kędzierzyn-Koźle	23–25	26–28	28–26	23–25		100–104	Report

== Final phase ==
=== Semi finals ===
Team 1	Agg.	Team 2	1st leg	2nd leg
Dinamo Moscow (Russia)	6–0	(Belgium) Volley behappy2 Asse-Lennik	3–0	3–0
ZAKSA Kędzierzyn-Koźle (Poland)	3–6	(Italy) Energy T.I. Diatec Trentino	2–3	1–3

==== First leg ====
Date	Time		Score		Set 1	Set 2	Set 3	Set 4	Set 5	Total	Report
24 Mar	19:00	Dinamo Moscow (Russia)	3–0	(Belgium) Volley behappy2 Asse-Lennik	25–16	25–16	25–16			75–48	Report
24 Mar	20:30	ZAKSA Kędzierzyn-Koźle (Poland)	2–3	(Italy) Energy T.I. Diatec Trentino	20–25	25–21	23–25	27–25	17–19	112–115	Report

==== Second leg ====
Date	Time		Score		Set 1	Set 2	Set 3	Set 4	Set 5	Total	Report
28 Mar	20:30	Volley behappy2 Asse-Lennik (Belgium)	0–3	(Russia) Dinamo Moscow	19–25	25–27	30–32			74–84	Report
28 Mar	20:30	Energy T.I. Diatec Trentino (Italy)	3–1	(Poland) ZAKSA Kędzierzyn-Koźle	25–17	23–25	25–22	25–18		98–82	Report

=== Final ===
==== First leg ====
Date	Time		Score		Set 1	Set 2	Set 3	Set 4	Set 5	Total	Report
7 Apr	20:30	Energy T.I. Diatec Trentino (Italy)	1–3	(Russia) Dinamo Moscow	23–25	25–23	22–25	21–25		91–98	Report

==== Second leg ====
Date	Time		Score		Set 1	Set 2	Set 3	Set 4	Set 5	Total	Report
11 Apr	18:00	Dinamo Moscow (Russia)	1–3	(Italy) Energy T.I. Diatec Trentino	27–25	19–25	17–25	24–26		87–101	Report
Golden set		Dinamo Moscow (Russia)	15–12	(Italy) Energy T.I. Diatec Trentino							

== Final standing ==
Rank	Team
1st place, gold medalist(s)	(Russia) Dinamo Moscow
2nd place, silver medalist(s)	(Italy) Energy T.I. Diatec Trentino
Semifinalists	(Belgium) Volley behappy2 Asse-Lennik
Semifinalists	(Poland) ZAKSA Kędzierzyn-Koźle

2015 CEV Cup winner
(Russia)
Dinamo Moscow
2nd title

Aleksey Obmochaev, Pavel Pankov, Sergey Grankin, Artem Ermakov, Ivan Zaytsev, Denis Biriukov, Yury Berezhko, Alexander Markin, Igor Philippov, Maxwell Holt, Dmitry Shcherbinin, Pavel Kruglov
Head coach
Yury Marichev
