= Ilia Vlasov =

Russian volleyball player (born 1995)

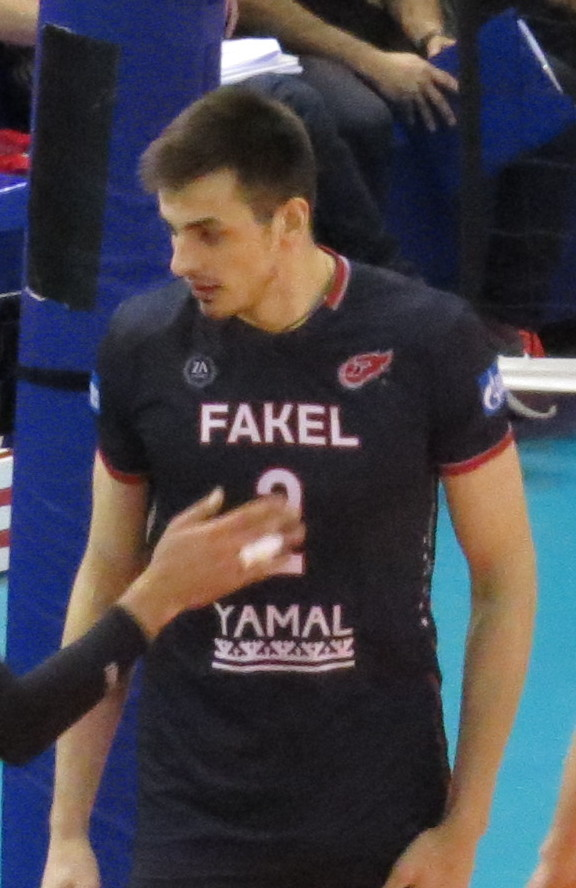

Personal information
- Full name: Ilia Sergeyevich Vlasov
- Nationality: (Russia) Russian
- Born: 3 August 1995 (age 31); Kumertau, Bashkortostan, Russia
- Height: 2.12 m (6 ft 11 in)
- Weight: 98 kg (216 lb)
- Spike: 355 cm (140 in)
- Block: 345 cm (136 in)

Volleyball information
- Position: Middle blocker
- Current club: (Russia) Dynamo Moscow
- Number: 2

Career
Years	Teams
2014–2018; 2018–	(Russia) Fakel Novy Urengoy (Russia) Dynamo Moscow

National team
2015–	Russia
Honours
Men's volleyball
Representing Russia
FIVB Nations League
Gold medal – first place	2018 Lille
CEV European Championship
Gold medal – first place	2017 Poland
European Games
Bronze medal – third place	2015 Azerbaijan

Ilia Sergeyevich Vlasov (Russian: Илья Сергеевич Власов) (born 3 August 1995) is a Russian volleyball player. He is part of the Russia men's national volleyball team. On club level, he plays for Dynamo Moscow.

== Sporting achievements ==
=== Clubs ===
- CEV Cup
  - 2020/2021 – with Dynamo Moscow
- CEV Challenge Cup
  - 2015/2016 – with Fakel Novy Urengoy
  - 2016/2017 – with Fakel Novy Urengoy
- National championships
  - 2020/2021 Russian Cup, with Dynamo Moscow
  - 2020/2021 Russian Championship, with Dynamo Moscow
  - 2020/2021 Russian Super Cup, with Dynamo Moscow
  - 2021/2022 Russian Championship, with Dynamo Moscow
  - 2021/2022 Russian Super Cup, with Dynamo Moscow

=== Youth national team ===
- 2013 CEV U19 European Championship
- 2014 CEV U20 European Championship

=== Universiade ===
- 2015 Summer Universiade

=== Individual awards ===
- 2013: CEV U19 European Championship – Best Blocker
