= Yaroslav Podlesnykh =

Russian volleyball player (born 1994)

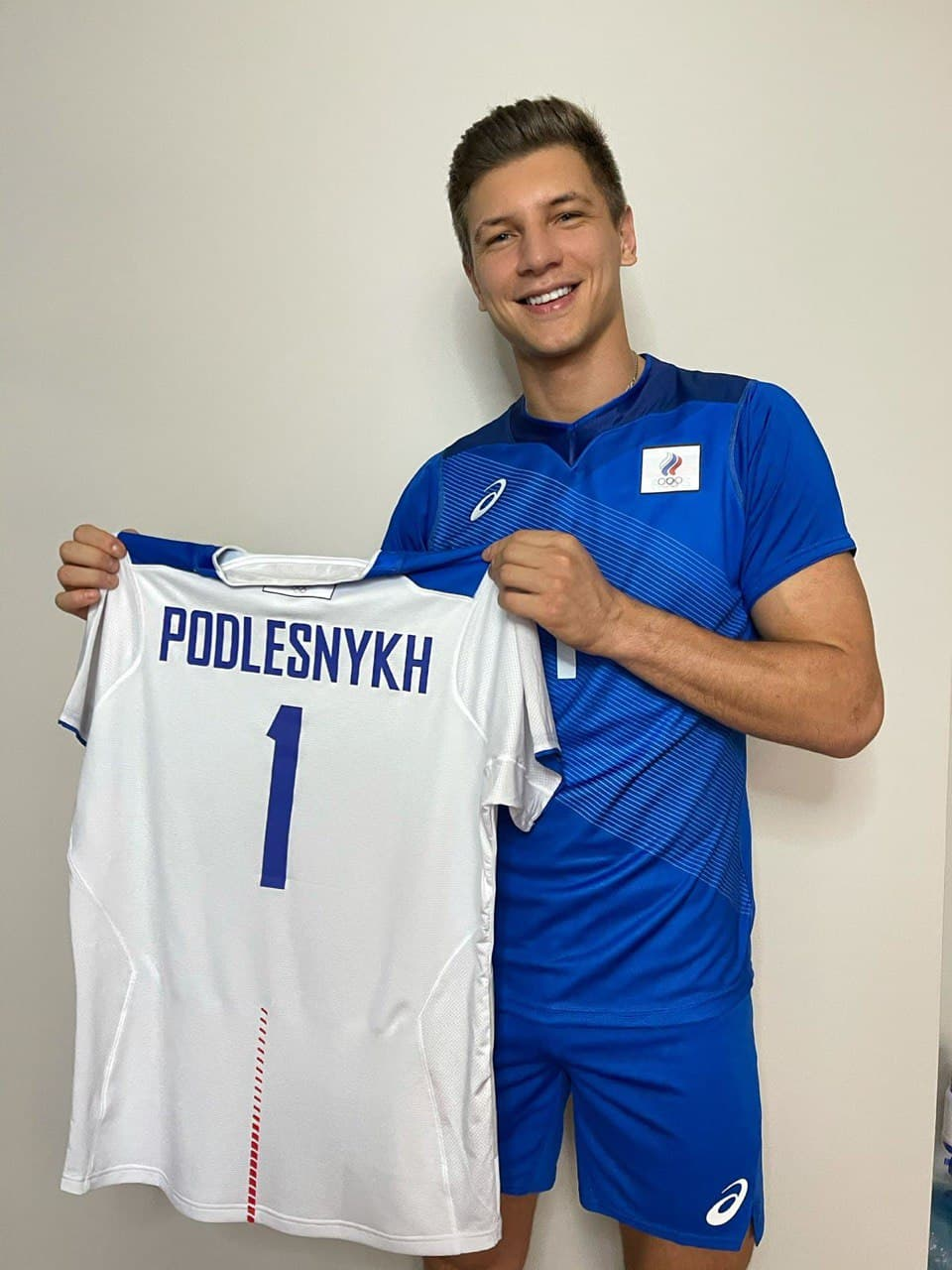
- Podlesnykh in 2021

Personal information
- Nationality: Russian
- Born: 3 September 1994 (age 32); Pyatigorsk, Russia

Volleyball information
- Position: outside hitter
- Current club: (Russia) Dynamo Moscow
- Number: 1
Honours
Volleyball
Representing ROC
Olympic Games
Silver medal – second place	2020 Tokyo	Team
Representing Russia
FIVB Nations League
Gold medal – first place	2019 Chicago	Team

Yaroslav Igorevich Podlesnykh (Russian: Ярослав Игоревич Подлесных, IPA: [ɪ̯ɪrɐˈsɫaf pɐˈdlʲesnɨx]; born 3 September 1994) is a Russian volleyball player, a member of the Russian men's national volleyball team.

== Sporting achievements ==
=== Clubs ===
- CEV Cup
  - 2020/2021 – with Dynamo Moscow
- National championships
  - 2020/2021 Russian Cup, with Dynamo Moscow
  - 2020/2021 Russian Championship, with Dynamo Moscow
  - 2020/2021 Russian Super Cup, with Dynamo Moscow
  - 2021/2022 Russian Championship, with Dynamo Moscow
  - 2021/2022 Russian Super Cup, with Dynamo Moscow
