= Lauri Kerminen =

Finnish volleyball player (born 1993)

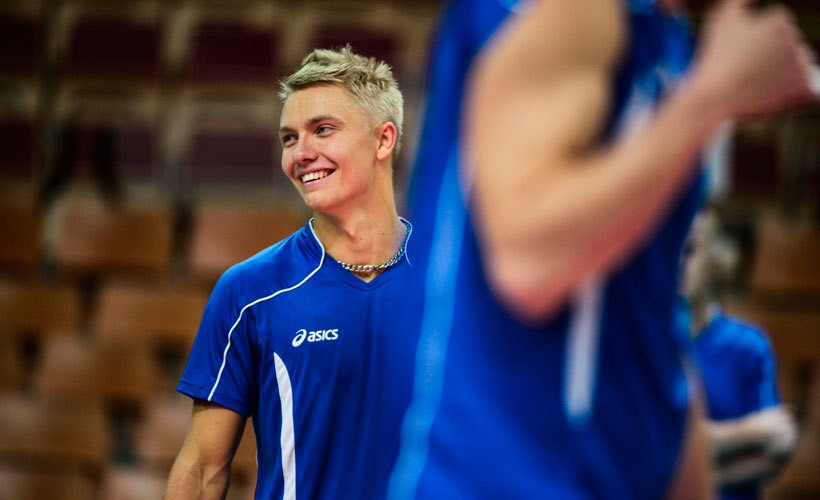

Personal information
- Full name: Lauri Kalle Juhani Kerminen
- Nickname: Late, Kerma
- Nationality: Finnish
- Born: 18 January 1993 (age 33); Suonenjoki, Finland
- Height: 1.82 m (6 ft 0 in)
- Weight: 79 kg (174 lb)

Volleyball information
- Position: Libero
- Current club: Dynamo Moscow
- Number: 23

Career
Years	Teams
2011–2014; 2014–2015; 2015–2020; 2020–	Kokkolan Tiikerit; Nantes Rezé Métropole; Kuzbass Kemerovo; Dynamo Moscow

National team
2013–2022	Finland

Lauri Kalle Juhani Kerminen (born 18 January 1993) is a Finnish professional volleyball player who plays as a libero for Dynamo Moscow. He used to play for the Finland national team.

== Honours ==
=== Club ===
- CEV Cup
  - 2020–21 – with Dynamo Moscow
- Domestic
  - 2012–13 Finnish Championship, with Kokkolan Tiikerit
  - 2013–14 Finnish Cup, with Kokkolan Tiikerit
  - 2018–19 Russian Championship, with Kuzbass Kemerovo
  - 2019–20 Russian SuperCup, with Kuzbass Kemerovo
  - 2020–21 Russian Cup, with Dynamo Moscow
  - 2020–21 Russian Championship, with Dynamo Moscow
  - 2020–21 Russian SuperCup, with Dynamo Moscow
  - 2021–22 Russian Championship, with Dynamo Moscow
  - 2021–22 Russian SuperCup, with Dynamo Moscow
