= Dmitry Ilinikh =

Russian volleyball player (born 1987)

Dmitriy Ilinikh
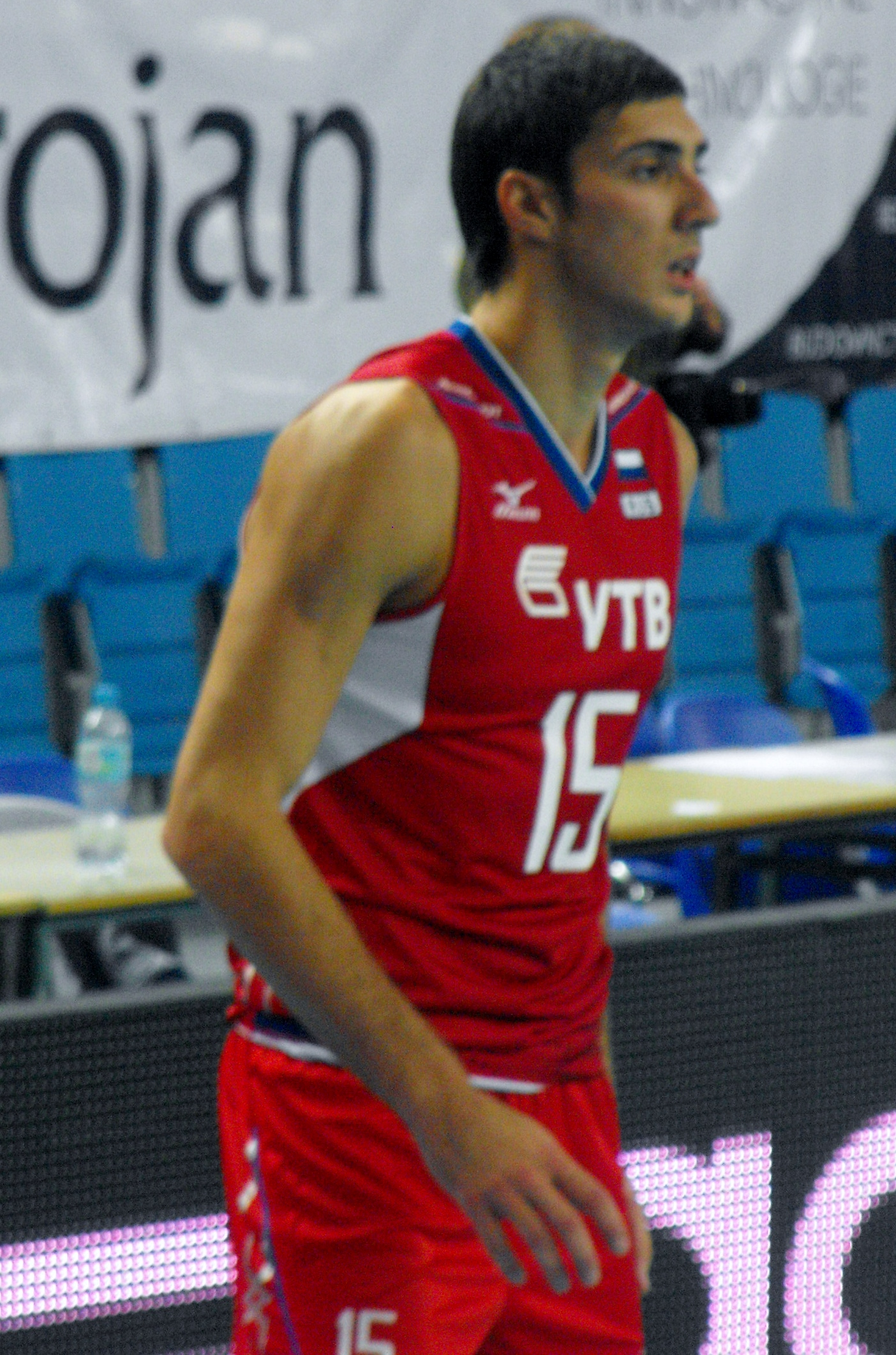

Personal information
- Born: 31 January 1987 (age 39); Adler Microdistrict, Russian SFSR, Soviet Union
- Height: 202 cm (6 ft 8 in)
Honours
Representing Russia
Men's volleyball
Olympic Games
Gold medal – first place	2012 London	Team
European Championship
Gold medal – first place	2013 Denmark/Poland	Team
World League
Gold medal – first place	2013 Argentina	Team
Gold medal – first place	2011 Poland	Team

Dmitriy Ilinikh (Russian: Дмитрий Сергеевич Ильиних; born 31 January 1987) is a Russian volleyball player, who competes for Belogorie Belogorod and the national team. in 2011 he was included in the application for the World League. Participated in 13 matches, the tournament ended with victory for the Russian team, gaining 50 points in them. In 2011, as a part of the national team, Ilinykh won the World League 2011 and 2013. He has competed at the 2012 Summer Olympics, where Russia won the gold medal in the final against Brazil.
