= Pavel Kruglov =

Russian volleyball player (born 1985)

Personal information
- Full name: Pavel Nikolaevich Kruglov
- Nationality: Russian
- Born: 17 September 1985 (age 41); Moscow, Russia, USSR
- Height: 2.04 m (6 ft 8 in)
- Weight: 90 kg (198 lb)
- Spike: 351 cm (138 in)
- Block: 342 cm (135 in)

Volleyball information
- Position: Opposite
- Current club: Lokomotiv Novosibirsk
- Number: 15

Career
Years	Teams
2002–2003; 2003–2006; 2006–2009; 2009–2010; 2010–2019; 2019–	Dinamo Moscow; Luch Moscow; Dinamo Moscow; Iskra Odintsovo; Dinamo Moscow; Lokomotiv Novosibirsk

National team
2005–2019	Russia
Honours
Men's volleyball
Representing Russia
World Cup
Gold medal – first place	2011 Japan
Silver medal – second place	2007 Japan
World League
Bronze medal – third place	2006 Moscow
Bronze medal – third place	2008 Rio de Janeiro
European Championship
Silver medal – second place	2007 Russia
- Last updated: 8 March 2020

Pavel Kruglov (born 17 September 1985) is a Russian male volleyball player. He is part of the Russia men's national volleyball team. At the club level, he plays for VC Lokomotiv Novosibirsk.

== Sporting achievements ==
=== CEV Cup ===
- 2011/2012, with Dinamo Moscow
- 2014/2015, with Dinamo Moscow
