= 2013 Men's European Volleyball Championship =

2013 Men's European Championship
Tournament details
- Host country: Denmark; Poland
- Dates: 20–29 September
- Teams: 16
- Venues: 6 (in 6 host cities)

Final positions
- Champions: Russia (1st title)

Tournament awards
- MVP: (Russia) Dmitriy Muserskiy

The 2013 Men's European Volleyball Championship was the 28th edition of the European Volleyball Championship, organised by Europe's governing volleyball body, the CEV. It was held in Denmark and Poland from 20 to 29 September 2013.

The championship was won by Russia with Italy as runners-up and Serbia on the 3rd place.

== Qualification ==
- Hosts
  - Denmark
  - Poland
- Top 5 teams of the 2011 edition directly qualified.
  - Serbia
  - Italy
  - Russia
  - Slovakia
  - Bulgaria
- Qualified through the qualification.
  - Belarus
  - Belgium
  - Czech Republic
  - Finland
  - France
  - Germany
  - Netherlands
  - Slovenia
  - Turkey

== Pools composition ==
The draw was held on 15 October 2012.

Pool A	Pool B	Pool C	Pool D
Denmark (Hosts)	Poland (Hosts)	Finland	Russia
Italy	Slovakia	Serbia	Bulgaria
Belarus	France	Netherlands	Germany
Belgium	Turkey	Slovenia	Czech Republic

== Venues ==
Pool A	Pool B, Playoffs and Quarterfinals	Pool C
Odense, Denmark	Gdańsk, Poland	Herning, Denmark
Arena Fyn	Ergo Arena	Jyske Bank Boxen
Capacity: 4,000	Capacity: 11,409	Capacity: 12,000

Pool D	Playoffs and Quarterfinals	Semifinals, 3rd place match and Final
Gdynia, Poland	Aarhus, Denmark	Copenhagen, Denmark
Gdynia Sports Arena	NRGi Arena	Parken Stadium
Capacity: 5,500	Capacity: 4,740	Capacity: 10,000

== Pool standing procedure ==
1. Match points
2. Number of matches won
3. Sets ratio
4. Points ratio
5. Result of the last match between the tied teams

Match won 3–0 or 3–1: 3 match points for the winner, 0 match points for the loser
Match won 3–2: 2 match points for the winner, 1 match point for the loser

== Preliminary round ==
- All times are Central European Summer Time (UTC+02:00).

=== Pool A ===
Pos	Team	Pld	W	L	Pts	SW	SL	SR	SPW	SPL	SPR	Qualification
1	Belgium	3	3	0	8	9	3	3.000	284	251	1.131	Quarterfinals
2	Italy	3	2	1	7	8	4	2.000	274	238	1.151	Playoffs
3	Denmark	3	1	2	2	4	8	0.500	249	278	0.896	Playoffs
4	Belarus	3	0	3	1	3	9	0.333	236	276	0.855	

Date	Time		Score		Set 1	Set 2	Set 3	Set 4	Set 5	Total	Report
20 Sep	17:30	Belgium	3–0	Belarus	25–22	25–20	25–16			75–58	Report
20 Sep	20:45	Denmark	0–3	Italy	22–25	17–25	15–25			54–75	Report
21 Sep	15:00	Belarus	1–3	Italy	25–21	13–25	21–25	17–25		76–96	Report
21 Sep	18:00	Belgium	3–1	Denmark	23–25	25–23	25–16	28–26		101–90	Report
22 Sep	15:00	Belarus	2–3	Denmark	21–25	25–17	25–23	20–25	11–15	102–105	Report
22 Sep	18:00	Italy	2–3	Belgium	23–25	19–25	25–18	27–25	9–15	103–108	Report

=== Pool B ===
Pos	Team	Pld	W	L	Pts	SW	SL	SR	SPW	SPL	SPR	Qualification
1	France	3	3	0	9	9	2	4.500	276	261	1.057	Quarterfinals
2	Poland	3	2	1	6	7	5	1.400	283	268	1.056	Playoffs
3	Slovakia	3	1	2	2	4	8	0.500	272	292	0.932	Playoffs
4	Turkey	3	0	3	1	4	9	0.444	283	293	0.966	

Date	Time		Score		Set 1	Set 2	Set 3	Set 4	Set 5	Total	Report
20 Sep	17:00	France	3–0	Slovakia	25–20	35–33	28–26			88–79	Report
20 Sep	20:00	Poland	3–1	Turkey	25–22	25–15	22–25	25–21		97–83	Report
21 Sep	17:00	Slovakia	3–2	Turkey	18–25	16–25	25–20	25–21	19–17	103–108	Report
21 Sep	20:00	France	3–1	Poland	25–22	25–23	20–25	25–20		95–90	Report
22 Sep	17:00	Turkey	1–3	France	21–25	23–25	25–18	23–25		92–93	Report
22 Sep	20:00	Slovakia	1–3	Poland	24–26	25–20	19–25	22–25		90–96	Report

=== Pool C ===
Pos	Team	Pld	W	L	Pts	SW	SL	SR	SPW	SPL	SPR	Qualification
1	Finland	3	2	1	6	6	5	1.200	258	260	0.992	Quarterfinals
2	Serbia	3	2	1	5	7	5	1.400	266	247	1.077	Playoffs
3	Netherlands	3	1	2	4	6	7	0.857	280	291	0.962	Playoffs
4	Slovenia	3	1	2	3	5	7	0.714	277	283	0.979	

Date	Time		Score		Set 1	Set 2	Set 3	Set 4	Set 5	Total	Report
20 Sep	17:00	Slovenia	3–1	Serbia	20–25	25–23	25–22	25–19		95–89	Report
20 Sep	20:00	Finland	3–1	Netherlands	23–25	25–22	27–25	25–20		100–92	Report
21 Sep	15:00	Serbia	3–2	Netherlands	19–25	18–25	25–15	25–17	15–12	102–94	Report
21 Sep	18:00	Slovenia	1–3	Finland	27–25	23–25	22–25	21–25		93–100	Report
22 Sep	15:00	Netherlands	3–1	Slovenia	19–25	25–19	25–22	25–23		94–89	Report
22 Sep	18:00	Serbia	3–0	Finland	25–20	25–23	25–15			75–58	Report

=== Pool D ===
Pos	Team	Pld	W	L	Pts	SW	SL	SR	SPW	SPL	SPR	Qualification
1	Germany	3	3	0	8	9	2	4.500	267	232	1.151	Quarterfinals
2	Russia	3	2	1	6	6	4	1.500	235	201	1.169	Playoffs
3	Bulgaria	3	1	2	4	6	7	0.857	288	294	0.980	Playoffs
4	Czech Republic	3	0	3	0	1	9	0.111	184	247	0.745	

Date	Time		Score		Set 1	Set 2	Set 3	Set 4	Set 5	Total	Report
20 Sep	17:00	Russia	0–3	Germany	20–25	23–25	19–25			62–75	Report
20 Sep	20:00	Czech Republic	1–3	Bulgaria	15–25	18–25	25–22	21–25		79–97	Report
21 Sep	15:00	Germany	3–2	Bulgaria	36–34	20–25	21–25	25–21	15–9	117–114	Report
21 Sep	18:00	Russia	3–0	Czech Republic	25–22	25–17	25–10			75–49	Report
22 Sep	15:00	Germany	3–0	Czech Republic	25–13	25–23	25–20			75–56	Report
22 Sep	18:00	Bulgaria	1–3	Russia	18–25	25–23	14–25	19–25		76–98	Report

== Final round ==
- All times are Central European Summer Time (UTC+02:00).

Playoffs; 24 September
Serbia	3
Denmark	0
Russia	3
Slovakia	0
Italy	3
Netherlands	1
Poland	2
Bulgaria	3

Quarterfinals; 25 September
Belgium	1
Serbia	3
France	1
Russia	3
Finland	1
Italy	3
Germany	1
Bulgaria	3

Semifinals; 28 September
Serbia	1
Russia	3
Italy	3
Bulgaria	1

Final; 29 September
Russia	3
Italy	1
Third place
Serbia	3
Bulgaria	0

=== Playoffs ===
Date	Time	Venue		Score		Set 1	Set 2	Set 3	Set 4	Set 5	Total	Report
24 Sep	17:00	NRA	Italy	3–1	Netherlands	24–26	25–18	25–21	25–18		99–83	Report
24 Sep	17:00	ERA	Russia	3–0	Slovakia	25–20	25–14	25–21			75–55	Report
24 Sep	20:00	NRA	Serbia	3–0	Denmark	25–17	25–17	25–22			75–56	Report
24 Sep	20:00	ERA	Poland	2–3	Bulgaria	25–22	25–22	20–25	24–26	16–18	110–113	Report

=== Quarterfinals ===
Date	Time	Venue		Score		Set 1	Set 2	Set 3	Set 4	Set 5	Total	Report
25 Sep	17:00	ERA	France	1–3	Russia	17–25	25–17	22–25	21–25		85–92	Report
25 Sep	17:00	NRA	Finland	1–3	Italy	25–23	20–25	22–25	22–25		89–98	Report
25 Sep	20:00	NRA	Belgium	1–3	Serbia	22–25	25–22	28–30	18–25		93–102	Report
25 Sep	20:00	ERA	Germany	1–3	Bulgaria	30–28	25–27	22–25	20–25		97–105	Report

=== Semifinals ===
Date	Time	Venue		Score		Set 1	Set 2	Set 3	Set 4	Set 5	Total	Report
28 Sep	15:00	PAS	Serbia	1–3	Russia	19–25	26–24	23–25	15–25		83–99	Report
28 Sep	18:00	PAS	Italy	3–1	Bulgaria	19–25	25–22	25–15	25–22		94–84	Report

=== 3rd place match ===
Date	Time	Venue		Score		Set 1	Set 2	Set 3	Set 4	Set 5	Total	Report
29 Sep	15:00	PAS	Serbia	3–0	Bulgaria	25–22	32–30	27–25			84–77	Report

=== Final ===
Date	Time	Venue		Score		Set 1	Set 2	Set 3	Set 4	Set 5	Total	Report
29 Sep	18:00	PAS	Russia	3–1	Italy	25–20	25–22	22–25	25–17		97–84	Report

== Final standing ==
Rank	Team
1st place, gold medalist(s)	Russia
2nd place, silver medalist(s)	Italy
3rd place, bronze medalist(s)	Serbia
4	Bulgaria
5	France
6	Germany
7	Belgium
8	Finland
9	Poland
10	Netherlands
11	Slovakia
12	Denmark
13	Slovenia
14	Turkey
15	Belarus
16	Czech Republic

Qualified for the 2013 World Grand Champions Cup and the 2014 World Championship
Qualified for the 2014 World Championship

2013 Men's European champions

Russia
13th title

14–man Roster
Makarov, Apalikov, Grankin, Sivozhelez, Pavlov, Spiridonov, Zhilin, Ashchev, Muserskiy, Volvich, Ilinikh, Verbov, Mikhaylov, Ermakov
Head coach
Voronkov

== Awards ==
- Most valuable player
  (Russia) Dmitriy Muserskiy
- Best scorer
  (Serbia) Aleksandar Atanasijević
- Best spiker
  (Italy) Luca Vettori
- Best blocker
  (Serbia) Srećko Lisinac
- Best server
  (Italy) Ivan Zaytsev
- Best setter
  (Russia) Sergey Grankin
- Best receiver
  (Bulgaria) Todor Aleksiev
- Best libero
  (Russia) Aleksey Verbov
- Fair play award
  (Serbia) Nikola Jovović
