= Denis Biryukov =

Russian male volleyball player

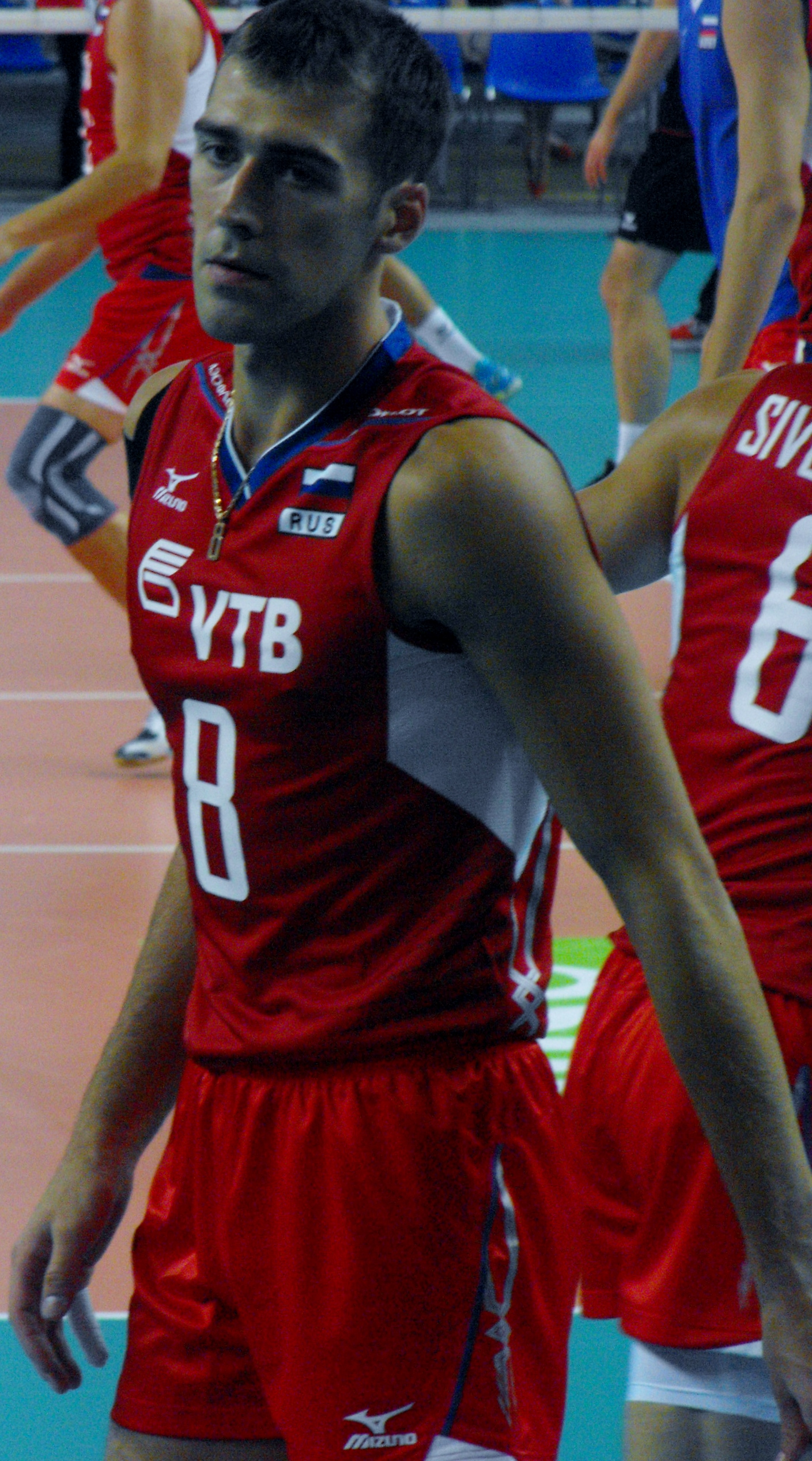

Personal information
- Full name: Denis Sergeyevich Biryukov
- Nationality: Russian
- Born: 8 December 1988 (age 37); Volgograd, Russia, USSR
- Height: 2.02 m (6 ft 8 in)
- Weight: 93 kg (205 lb)
- Spike: 352 cm (139 in)
- Block: 324 cm (128 in)

Volleyball information
- Position: Outside hitter
- Current club: Dinamo Moscow
- Number: 9

Career
Years	Teams
2006–2008; 2008–2009; 2009–2011; 2011; 2011–2013; 2013–2017; 2017–2018; 2018–2019; 2019–2020; 2020–	Belogorie Belgorod; VK Metallonivest; Belogorie Belgorod; Gazprom-Ugra Surgut; Lokomotiv Novosibirsk; Dinamo Moscow; Nova; Dinamo-LO; Ural; Dinamo-LO

National team
2009–2019	Russia
Honours
Men's volleyball
Representing Russia
World Cup
Gold medal – first place	2011 Japan
World League
Gold medal – first place	2011 Gdansk
Silver medal – second place	2010 Cordoba
- Last updated: 28 December 2017

Denis Sergeyevich Biryukov (Russian: Денис Сергеевич Бирюков; born 8 December 1988) is a Russian male volleyball player. He is part of the Russia men's national volleyball team at the 2010 FIVB Volleyball Men's World Championship. On club level he plays for Dinamo-LO.

== Sporting achievements ==
=== CEV Cup ===
- 2014/2015, with Dinamo Moscow
