= Evgeny Sivozhelez =

Russian male volleyball player (born 1986)

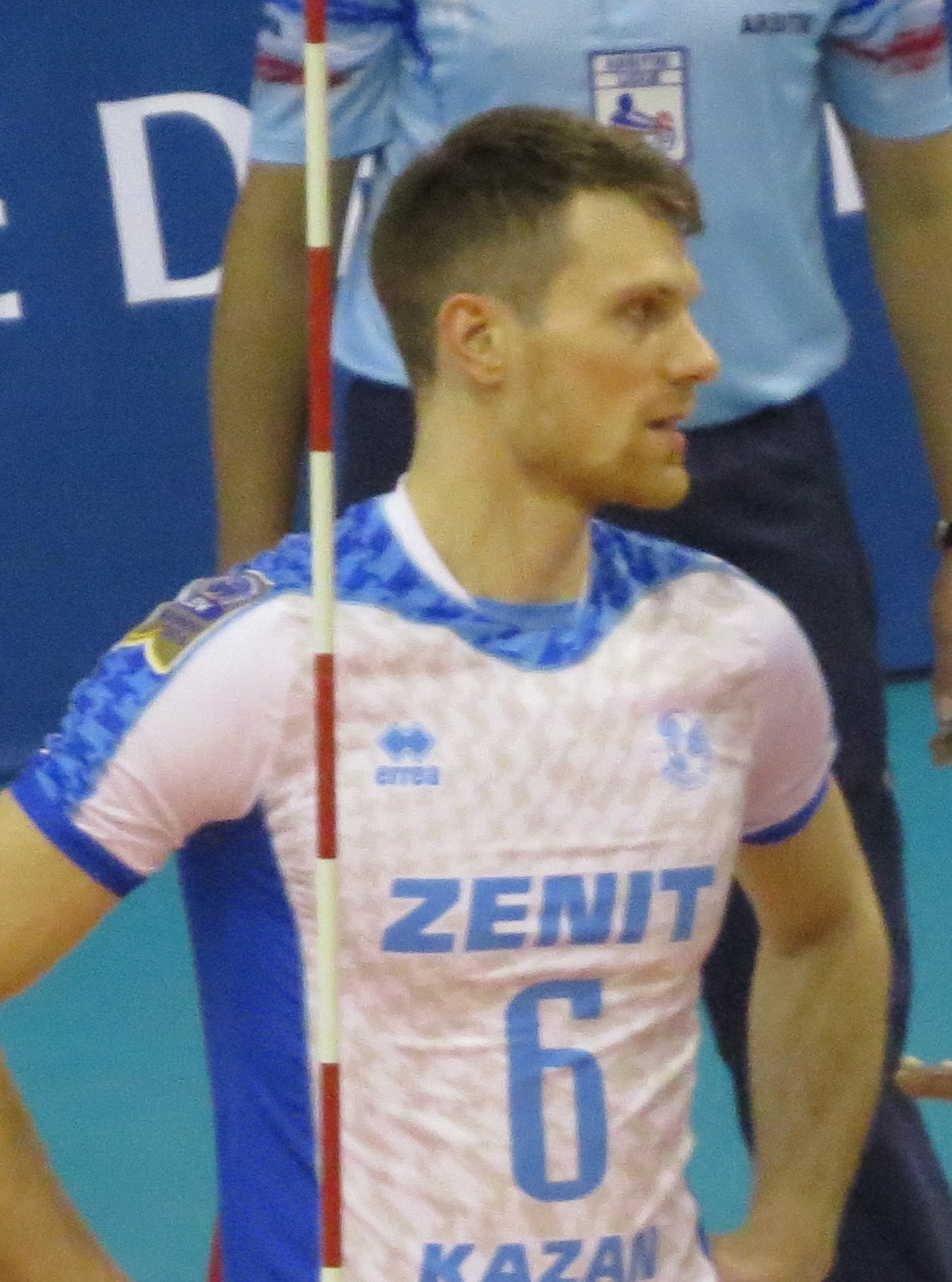

Personal information
- Full name: Evgeny Igorevich Sivozhelez
- Nationality: Russian
- Born: 6 August 1986 (age 40); USSR
- Height: 1.96 m (6 ft 5 in)
- Weight: 90 kg (198 lb)
- Spike: 330 cm (130 in)
- Block: 320 cm (126 in)

Volleyball information
- Position: Outside hitter
- Current team: Zenit Saint Petersburg
- Number: 6

Career
Years	Teams
2004–2008; 2008–2010; 2010–2011; 2011–2017; 2017–2019; 2019–2020; 2022–2024; 2024–	Yugra Nizhnevartovsk; Dinamo Moscow; Fakel Novy Urengoy; Zenit Kazan; Kuzbass Kemerovo; Zenit Saint Petersburg; Fakel Novy Urengoy; Zenit Saint Petersburg

National team
2009–2015	Russia
Honours
Men's volleyball
Representing Russia
World Cup
Gold medal – first place	2011 Japan
Silver medal – second place	2007 Japan
World Grand Champions Cup
Silver medal – second place	2013 Japan
European Championship
Gold medal – first place	2013 Denmark/Poland
World League
Gold medal – first place	2013 Mar del Plata
Bronze medal – third place	2009 Belgrade
- Last updated: 18 February 2024

Evgeny Igorevich Sivozhelez (Russian: Евгений Игоревич Сивожелез; born 6 August 1986) is a Russian male volleyball player. He plays with the Russia men's national volleyball team and won the gold medal at the 2013 Men's European Volleyball Championship. With his club Zenit Kazan he competed at the 2011 FIVB Volleyball Men's Club World Championship and 2012 FIVB Volleyball Men's Club World Championship.

== Sporting achievements ==
=== Clubs ===
==== FIVB Club World Championship ====
- Betim 2011 – with Zenit Kazan
- Betim 2015 – with Zenit Kazan
- Betim 2016 – with Zenit Kazan

==== CEV Champions League ====
- 2009/2010 – with Dynamo Moscow
- 2012/2013 – with Zenit Kazan
- 2012/2013 – with Zenit Kazan
- 2014/2015 – with Zenit Kazan
- 2015/2016 – with Zenit Kazan
- 2016/2017 – with Zenit Kazan

==== National championships ====
- 2009/2010 with Dynamo Moscow
- 2011/2012 with Zenit Kazan
- 2012/2013 with Zenit Kazan
- 2013/2014 with Zenit Kazan
- 2014/2015 with Zenit Kazan
- 2015/2016 with Zenit Kazan

==== National trophies ====
- 2008 Russian Cup, with Dynamo Moscow
- 2008 Russian SuperCup, with Dynamo Moscow
- 2009 Russian SuperCup, with Dynamo Moscow
- 2011 Russian SuperCup, with Zenit Kazan
- 2012 Russian Cup, with Zenit Kazan
- 2012 Russian SuperCup, with Zenit Kazan
- 2013 Russian Cup, with Zenit Kazan
- 2014 Russian Cup, with Zenit Kazan
- 2015 Russian Cup, with Zenit Kazan
- 2015 Russian SuperCup, with Zenit Kazan
- 2016 Russian Cup, with Zenit Kazan
- 2016 Russian SuperCup, with Zenit Kazan

=== National team ===
- 2005 U21 World Championship
- 2009 World League
- 2011 World Cup
- 2011 Summer Universiade
- 2013 World League
- 2013 European Championship
- 2013 Champions Cup
