= Yury Berezhko =

Russian volleyball player

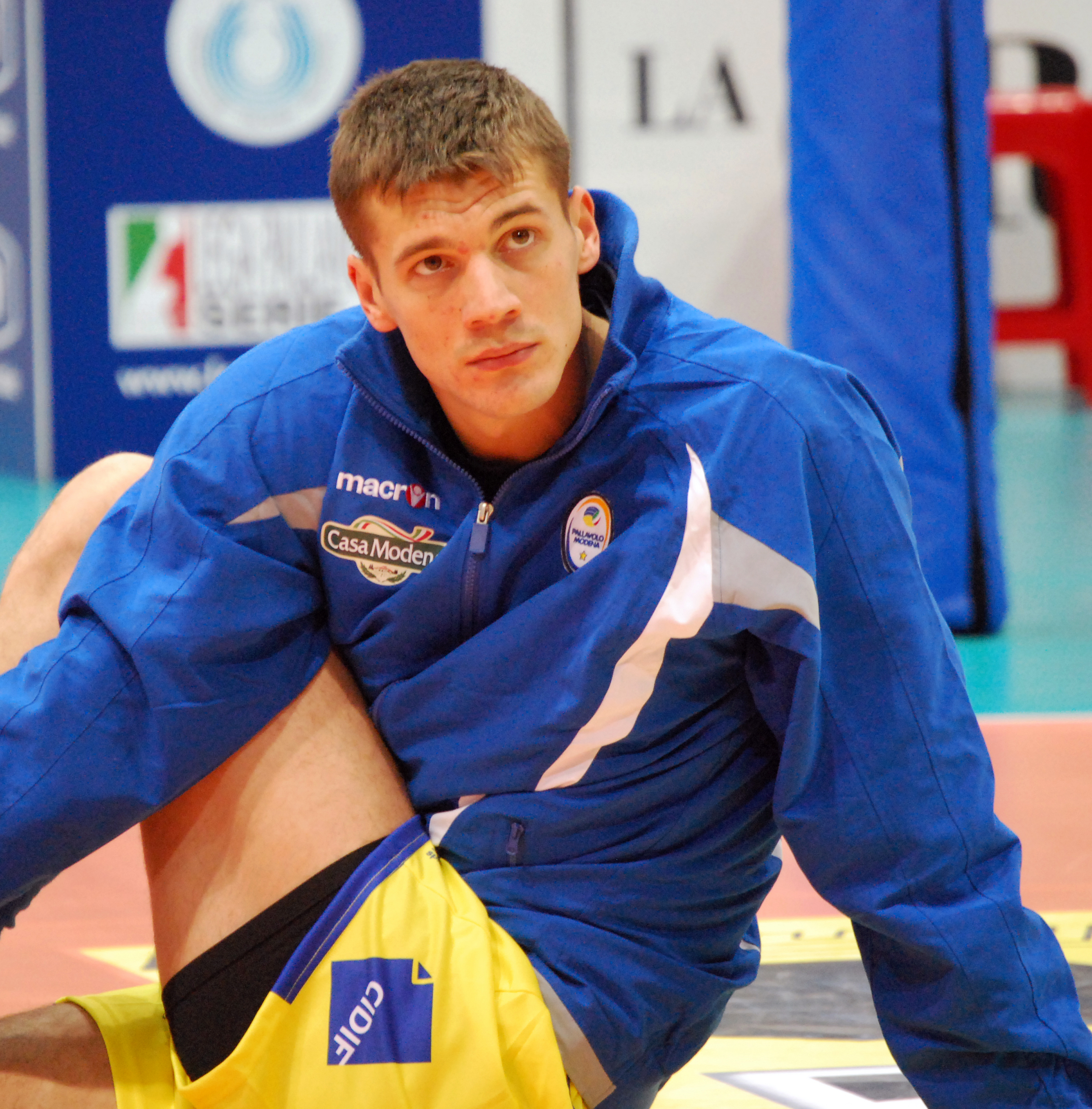

Personal information
- Full name: Yury Viktorovich Berezhko
- Nationality: Russian
- Born: 27 January 1984 (age 42); Komsomolsk-on-Amur, USSR
- Height: 1.98 m (6 ft 6 in)
- Weight: 90 kg (198 lb)
- Spike: 346 cm (136 in)
- Block: 338 cm (133 in)

Volleyball information
- Position: Outside hitter
- Current club: VC Lokomotiv Novosibirsk
- Number: 9

Career
Years	Teams
2001–2004; 2001–2010; 2010–2011; 2011–2013; 2013–2014; 2014–2020; 2021; 2021–2022; 2022–	Yaroslavich Yaroslavl; Dinamo Moscow; Casa Modena; Zenit Kazan; Dinamo Krasnodar; Dinamo Moscow; Galatasaray; Zenit Kazan; Lokomotiv Novosibirsk

National team
2005–2018	Russia
Honours
Representing Russia
Men's volleyball
Olympic Games
Gold medal – first place	2012 London	Team
Bronze medal – third place	2008 Beijing	Team
World Cup
Silver medal – second place	2007 Japan
World League
Gold medal – first place	2011 Gdansk
Silver medal – second place	2007 Katowice
Silver medal – second place	2010 Cordoba
Bronze medal – third place	2006 Moscow
Bronze medal – third place	2008 Rio de Janeiro
Bronze medal – third place	2009 Belgrade
European Championship
Gold medal – first place	2017 Kraków
Silver medal – second place	2007 Russia
European League
Gold medal – first place	2005 Russia
- Last updated: 22 January 2021

Yury Viktorovich Berezhko (Russian: Юрий Викторович Бережко; born 27 January 1984) is a Russian volleyball player. He currently plays outside hitter for VC Zenit-Kazan.

He is an Olympic gold medalist (2012), bronze medalist (2008), World Cup silver medalist and a silver medalist at the 2007 European Championship in Moscow, Russia, playing with the men's national team. Berezhko won Best server Award in 2009 European Championship. He won the award of Best Spiker in that occasion. In January, 2016 Yury Berezhko resumed performances for the Russian national team, helping the Russians qualify for the Olympic Games in Rio de Janeiro.

== Sporting achievements ==
=== CEV Cup ===
- 2014/2015, with Dinamo Moscow

=== Individual awards ===
- 2007 European Volleyball Championship – "Best Spiker"
- 2007 World League – "Best Spiker"
- 2009 European Volleyball Championship – "Best Server"
- 2003 European Champions League – "Best Receiver"
