= VC Dynamo Moscow =

Russian volleyball club

Dynamo Moscow
- Full name: Volleyball Club "Dinamo"
- Short name: Dynamo Moscow
- Founded: 1926
- Ground: Dynamo Sports Palace (Capacity: 5,000)
- Chairman: Viktor Komogorov
- Manager: Konstantin Bryanskiy
- Captain: Pavel Pankov
- League: Super League
- 2022/23: Runner-Up
- Website: Club home page

Uniforms
Home	Away

VC Dynamo Moscow (Russian: ВК Динамо Москва) is a Russian professional men's volleyball team based in Moscow which is playing in the Super League. Dynamo Moscow won the title of Russian Championionship for times (2006, 2008, 2021, 2022). The club won a silver and two bronze medals at the CEV Champions League.

== Achievements ==
- CEV Champions League

Runners-up (1): 2010
Third place (2): 2007, 2011

- CEV Cup

Winners (4): 1985, 2012, 2015, 2021
Third place (1): 1990

- USSR / Russian Championship

Winners (9): 1945, 1946, 1947, 1948, 1951, 2006, 2008, 2021, 2022
Runners-up (16): 1950, 1952, 1953, 1958, 1984, 1985, 1988, 1989, 2004, 2005, 2007, 2011, 2012, 2016, 2023, 2024
Third place (10): 1949, 1965, 1980, 1983, 1986, 1992, 1993, 2002, 2010, 2015

- USSR / Russian Cup

Winners (6): 1950, 1951, 1952, 2006, 2008, 2020

- Russian SuperCup

Winners (4): 2008, 2009, 2021, 2022

== European record ==
Season	Competition	Round	Club	Home	Away	Aggregate
2017–18	CEV Champions League					
2017–18	CEV Champions League	League round	Lokomotiv Novosibirsk	2–3	0–3	4th in Group
2017–18	CEV Champions League	League round	Skra Bełchatów	2–3	1–3	4th in Group
2017–18	CEV Champions League	League round	Chaumont Volley	3–1	2–3	4th in Group
2018–19	CEV Champions League					
2018–19	CEV Champions League	League round	Sir Colussi Sicoma Perugia	1–3	0–3	Quarterfinals
2018–19	CEV Champions League	League round	Tours	3–0	3–0	Quarterfinals
2018–19	CEV Champions League	League round	Arkas İzmir	3–0	3–0	Quarterfinals
2018–19	CEV Champions League	QF	Cucine Lube Civitanova	2–3	0–3	Quarterfinals
2020–21	CEV Cup					
2020–21	CEV Cup	L16	Vojvodina Novi Sad	—	3–2	Winner
2020–21	CEV Cup	QF	Arcada Galați	—	3–0	Winner
2020–21	CEV Cup	SF	Montpellier	3–1	3–0	Winner
2020–21	CEV Cup	F	Zenit Saint Petersburg	3–2	3–1	Winner
2021–22	CEV Champions League					
2021–22	CEV Champions League	League round	Ziraat Bankası	3–0	3–0	1st in Group
2021–22	CEV Champions League	League round	Projekt Warsaw	3–2	3–0	1st in Group
2021–22	CEV Champions League	League round	Greenyard Maaseik	3–0	3–0	1st in Group
2021–22	CEV Champions League	QF	ZAKSA Kędzierzyn-Koźle	0–3	0–3	W.O.

== Team roster ==
Team roster – season 2021/2022

No.	Name	Date of birth	Position
1	(Russia) Yaroslav Podlesnykh	September 3, 1994 (age 31)	outside hitter
2	(Russia) Ilia Vlasov	August 3, 1995 (age 30)	middle blocker
3	(Russia) Pavel Pankov (C)	August 14, 1995 (age 30)	setter
4	(Russia) Anton Anoshko	March 25, 2001 (age 24)	setter
5	(Russia) Romanas Shkulyavichus	February 21, 1992 (age 33)	opposite
7	(Russia) Evgeny Baranov	June 30, 1995 (age 30)	libero
9	(Russia) Denis Bogdan	October 23, 1996 (age 29)	outside hitter
10	(Russia) Cheslavs Sventitskis	August 23, 1993 (age 32)	setter
11	(Russia) Dmitry Zhuk	November 12, 1993 (age 31)	middle blocker
13	(Russia) Maksim Belogortsev	February 3, 1996 (age 29)	middle blocker
14	(Russia) Nikita Marshavin	July 18, 2000 (age 25)	setter
15	(Russia) Semyon Dmitriev	January 14, 1994 (age 31)	outside hitter
16	(Russia) Ivan Korotaev	March 1, 2002 (age 23)	outside hitter
18	(Russia) Anton Semyshev	August 22, 1997 (age 28)	outside hitter
19	(Bulgaria) Tsvetan Sokolov	December 31, 1989 (age 35)	opposite
20	(Russia) Mikhail Danilov	March 16, 2002 (age 23)	outside hitter
21	(Russia) Andrey Senin	December 11, 2000 (age 24)	libero
23	(Finland) Lauri Kerminen	January 18, 1993 (age 32)	libero
24	(Russia) Vadim Likhosherstov	January 23, 1989 (age 36)	middle blocker
Head coach: Konstantin Bryanskiy

Team roster – season 2020/2021
No.	Name	Date of birth	Position
1	(Russia) Yaroslav Podlesnykh	September 3, 1994 (age 31)	outside hitter
2	(Russia) Ilia Vlasov	August 3, 1995 (age 30)	middle blocker
3	(Belgium) Sam Deroo	April 29, 1992 (age 33)	outside hitter
5	(Russia) Romanas Shkulyavichus	February 21, 1992 (age 33)	opposite
7	(Russia) Evgeny Baranov	June 30, 1995 (age 30)	libero
8	(Russia) Vladimir Sieemshchikov	August 31, 1987 (age 38)	middle blocker
9	(Russia) Yury Berezhko	January 27, 1984 (age 41)	outside hitter
10	(Russia) Cheslavs Sventitskis	August 23, 1993 (age 32)	setter
11	(Russia) Pavel Pankov (C)	August 14, 1995 (age 30)	setter
13	(Russia) Maksim Belogortsev	February 3, 1996 (age 29)	middle blocker
14	(Russia) Aleksey Kabeshov	June 22, 1991 (age 34)	libero
15	(Russia) Semyon Dmitriev	January 14, 1994 (age 31)	outside hitter
18	(Russia) Anton Semyshev	August 22, 1997 (age 28)	outside hitter
19	(Bulgaria) Tsvetan Sokolov	December 31, 1989 (age 35)	opposite
23	(Finland) Lauri Kerminen	January 18, 1993 (age 32)	libero
24	(Russia) Vadim Likhosherstov	January 23, 1989 (age 36)	middle blocker
Head coach: Konstantin Bryanskiy

Team roster – season 2015/2016
Dinamo Moscow
No.	Name	Date of birth	Position
1	(Russia) Aleksey Obmochaev	May 22, 1989 (age 36)	libero
3	(Russia) Pavel Pankov	August 14, 1995 (age 30)	setter
5	(Russia) Sergey Grankin	January 21, 1985 (age 40)	setter
6	(Russia) Artem Ermakov	March 16, 1982 (age 43)	libero
7	(Italy) Ivan Zaytsev	October 2, 1988 (age 37)	opposite
8	(Russia) Denis Biryukov	December 8, 1988 (age 36)	outside hitter
9	(Russia) Yury Berezhko	January 27, 1984 (age 41)	outside hitter
10	(Russia) Alexander Markin	July 28, 1990 (age 35)	outside hitter
11	(Russia) Igor Filippov	March 19, 1991 (age 34)	middle blocker
12	(United States) Maxwell Holt	March 12, 1987 (age 38)	middle blocker
14	(Russia) Dmitry Shcherbinin	September 10, 1989 (age 36)	middle blocker
15	(Russia) Pavel Kruglov	September 17, 1985 (age 40)	opposite
17	(Russia) Alexander Boldyrev	January 1, 1990 (age 35)	outside hitter
18	(Russia) Alexander Kimerov	September 11, 1996 (age 29)	middle blocker
Head coach: Oleg Antonov

Team roster – season 2009/2010
Dynamo Moscow
No.	Name	Date of birth	Position
1	(Russia) Aleksey Ostapenko	May 26, 1986	Middle blocker
3	(Bulgaria) Teodor Salparov	August 16, 1982	Libero
4	(Russia) Roman Bragin	April 17, 1987	Libero
5	(Russia) Sergey Grankin	January 22, 1987	Setter
6	(Russia) Yevgeni Sivozhelez	August 8, 1986	Outside hitter
7	(Russia) Maksim Botin	July 14, 1983	Outside hitter
8	(Russia) Semyon Poltavskiy	February 8, 1981	Opposite hitter
9	(Russia) Yury Berezhko	January 27, 1984	Outside hitter
10	(Russia) Roman Yakovlev	August 12, 1976	Opposite hitter
12	(Russia) Andrei Zubkov	July 13, 1981	Setter
13	(Russia) Aleksei Samoylenko	September 23, 1985	Middle blocker
14	(Russia) Dmitri Scherbinin	September 10, 1989	Middle blocker
17	(Brazil) Dante Amaral	September 30, 1980	Outside hitter
18	(Russia) Aleksandr Volkov	February 14, 1985	Middle blocker
Head coach:

== Notable players ==
Notable, former or current players of club, who are medalist of intercontinental tournaments in national teams or clubs.

- (Argentina) Alexis González
- (Belgium) Sam Deroo
- (Brazil) Dante Amaral
- (Bulgaria) Matey Kaziyski
- (Bulgaria) Teodor Salparov
- (Bulgaria) Tsvetan Sokolov
- (Canada) Stephen Maar
- (Finland) Lauri Kerminen
- (France) Dominique Daquin
- (France) Hubert Henno
- (France) Kévin Le Roux
- (Italy) Matej Černič
- (Italy) Ivan Zaytsev
- (Netherlands) Dick Kooy
- (Poland) Bartosz Kurek
- (Serbia and Montenegro) Vladimir Grbić
- (United States) Maxwell Holt
- (United States) David Lee
- (Russia) Pavel Abramov
- (Russia) Aleksandr Butko
- (Russia) Stanislav Dineykin
- (Russia) Andrey Egorchev
- (Russia) Aleksey Kazakov
- (Russia) Aleksandr Korneev
- (Russia) Aleksey Kuleshov
- (Russia) Aleksey Ostapenko
- (Russia) Semyon Poltavskiy
- (Russia) Evgeny Sivozhelez
- (Russia) Konstantin Ushakov
- (Russia) Aleksey Verbov
- (Russia) Aleksandr Volkov
- (Russia) Roman Yakovlev
- (Russia) Sergey Grankin
- (Russia) Yury Berezhko
- (Russia) Denis Biryukov
- (Russia) Aleksey Obmochaev
- (Russia) Pavel Kruglov
- (Russia) Roman Bragin
- (Russia) Nikolay Pavlov
- (Russia) Sergey Antipkin
