= Pavel Pankov =

Russian volleyball player (born 1995)

Personal information
- Full name: Pavel Vadimovich Pankov
- Nationality: Russian
- Born: August 14, 1995 (age 31); Moscow, Russia
- Height: 198 cm (6 ft 6 in)
- Weight: 90 kg (198 lb)
- Spike: 345 cm (136 in)
- Block: 330 cm (130 in)

Volleyball information
- Position: Setter
- Current team: Dinamo Moscow
- Number: 3

Career
Years	Teams
2012–2014; 2014–2016; 2016–2017; 2017–2019; 2019–	Gazprom-Ugra Surgut; Dinamo Moscow; Kuzbass Kemerovo; Zenit Saint Petersburg; Dinamo Moscow

National team
2017–2021	Russia
Honours
Volleyball
Representing ROC
Olympic Games
Silver medal – second place	2020 Tokyo	Team
Representing Russia
Summer Universiade
Gold medal – first place	2015 Gwangju	Team
Bronze medal – third place	2019 Naples	Team
World U23 Championship
Gold medal – first place	2015 United Arab Emirates	Under-23
Silver medal – second place	2017 Egypt	Under-23
World U21 Championship
Gold medal – first place	2013 Turkey	Under-21
Gold medal – first place	2015 Mexico	Under-21
World U19 Championship
Gold medal – first place	2013 Mexico	Under-19
European Junior Championship
Gold medal – first place	2014 Slovakia/Czech Republic	Under-20
European Youth Championship
Gold medal – first place	2013 Bosnia and Herzegovina/Serbia	Under-19
Bronze medal – third place	2011 Turkey	Under-19
European Youth Summer Olympic Festival
Gold medal – first place	2013 Utrecht	Team
- Last updated: 30 December 2017

Pavel Vadimovich Pankov (Russian: Павел Вадимович Панков, IPA: [ˈpavʲɪl pɐnˈkof]; born August 14, 1995) is a Russian volleyball player. He is a Master of Sports of international class in Russia.

== Personal life ==
Pankov's father, Vadim Pankov, is a volleyball coach. His mother, Marina Pankova, is a former volleyball player and an Olympic Champion in 1988. Pavel Pankov has an older sister, Ekaterina, who is playing for the Russian women's national team.

On 10 June 2017, Pavel Pankov married Zarechye-Odintsovo volleyball player Alina Yaroshik.

== Sporting achievements ==
- CEV Cup
  - 2014/2015 - with Dynamo Moscow
  - 2020/2021 - with Dynamo Moscow
- National championships
  - 2011/2012 Russian Championship, with Dynamo Moscow
  - 2014/2015 Russian Championship, with Dynamo Moscow
  - 2014/2015 Russian Cup, with Dynamo Moscow
  - 2015/2016 Russian Championship, with Dynamo Moscow
  - 2017/2018 Russian Championship, with Zenit Saint Petersburg
  - 2017/2018 Russian Cup, with Zenit Saint Petersburg
  - 2020/2021 Russian Cup, with Dynamo Moscow
  - 2020/2021 Russian Championship, with Dynamo Moscow
  - 2020/2021 Russian Super Cup, with Dynamo Moscow
  - 2021/2022 Russian Championship, with Dynamo Moscow
  - 2021/2022 Russian Super Cup, with Dynamo Moscow

=== Individual awards ===
- Best setter of the European Youth Championship (2011, 2013)
- MVP of the World Youth Championship (2013)
- Best server of the European Youth Olympic Festival (2013)
- MVP and best server of the Youth European Championship (2014)
- MVP of the Youth World Championship (2015)

=== With teams ===
- Bronze medalist of the European Youth Championships (2011)
- World Youth Champion (2013)
- Winner of the XII European Youth Olympic Festival (2013)
- World Junior Champion (2013, 2015)
- European Junior Champion (2014)
- Universiade Champion (2015)
- World Men's U23 Champion (2015)
