= Sergey Grankin =

Russian volleyball player

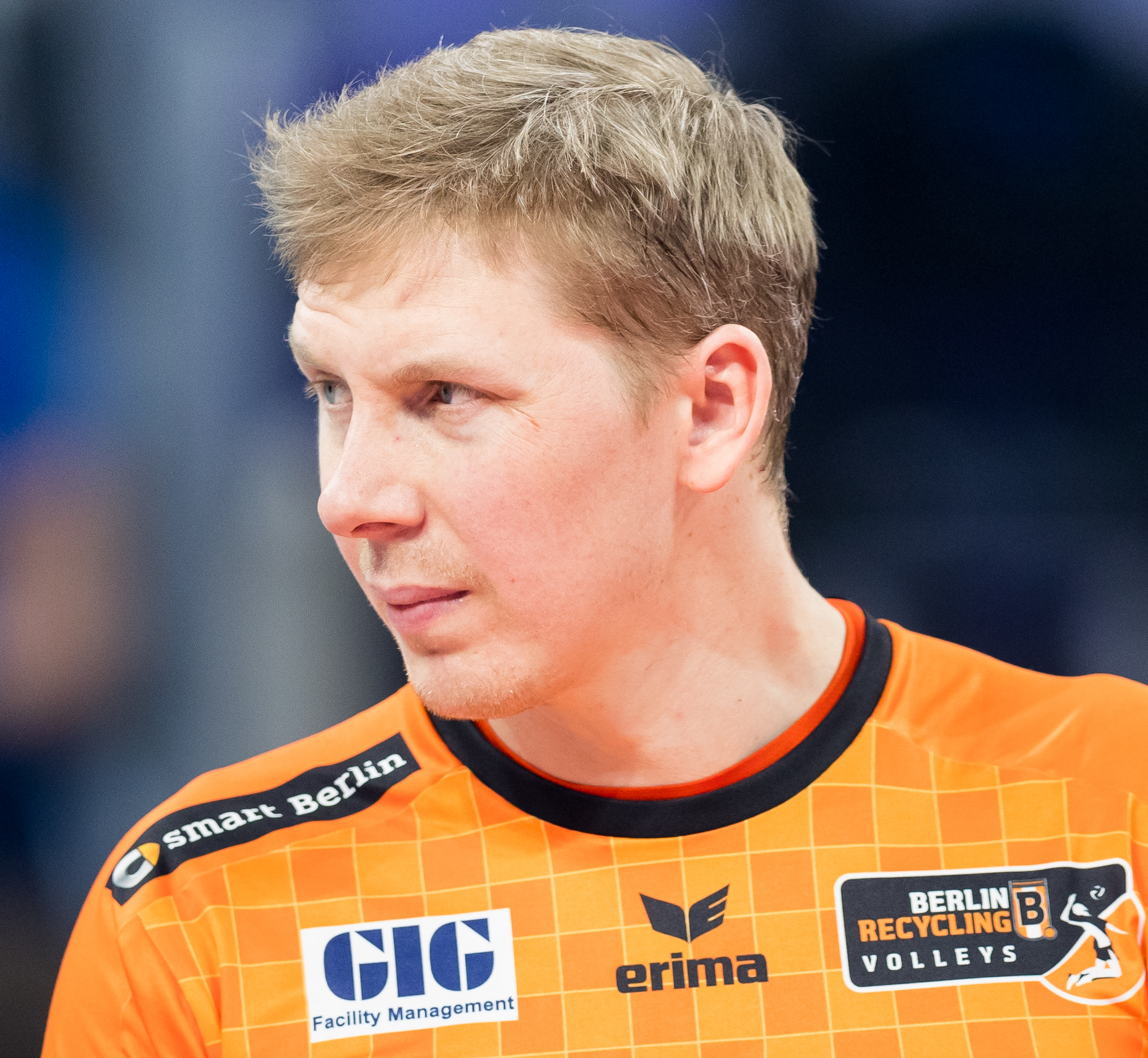
- Grankin in 2020

Personal information
- Full name: Sergey Yuryevich Grankin
- Nationality: (Russia) Russian
- Born: 21 January 1985 (age 41); Yessentuki, Russian SFSR, Soviet Union
- Height: 1.95 m (6 ft 5 in)
- Weight: 96 kg (212 lb)

Coaching information
Previous teams coached
Years	Teams
2024–2025	Yaroslavich Yaroslavl

Volleyball information
- Position: Setter
- Current club: Sporting CP
- Number: 5

Career
Years	Teams
2001–2005; 2005–2006; 2006–2017; 2017–2018; 2018–2019; 2019–2022; 2022–2024; 2025–	Netfyanik Yaroslavl; Luch Moscow; Dynamo Moscow; Belogorie Belgorod; Dynamo Moscow; Berlin Recycling Volleys; Fakel Novy Urengoy; Sporting CP

National team
2006–2019	Russia
Honours
Men's volleyball
Representing Russia
Olympic Games
Gold medal – first place	2012 London
Bronze medal – third place	2008 Beijing
FIVB World Grand Champions Cup
Silver medal – second place	2013 Japan
FIVB World League
Gold medal – first place	2011 Gdansk
Gold medal – first place	2013 Mar del Plata
Silver medal – second place	2010 Córdoba
Bronze medal – third place	2008 Rio de Janeiro
Bronze medal – third place	2009 Belgrade
CEV European Championship
Gold medal – first place	2013 Copenhagen
Gold medal – first place	2017 Poland

Sergey Yuryevich Grankin (Russian: Сергей Юрьевич Гранкин; born 21 January 1985) is a Russian volleyball player, a former member of the Russian national team. 2012 Olympic Champion, two–time European Champion (2013, 2017), and a multiple World League medallist, at the professional club level, he currently plays for Sporting Portugal.

== Career ==
Sergey Grankin started playing volleyball at the age of 7. Sergey Grankin captained the Youth team of Russia at the victorious European Championship in 2004 in Croatia, and the 2005 World Championships in India, where he first confidently made himself known. Mostly due to the mood of their captain, the Russians won the final match over Brazil in the first set when the score was 23:16 in favor of their rivals, the Russian scored 7 points in a row with Grankin serving, pulled out a losing set and broke down the Brazilians who lost the following two sets. He competed at the 2008 Summer Olympics where Russia claimed the bronze medal and at the 2012 Summer Olympics where Russia won the gold. He married his fiance Bruna de Araujo on 19 August 2012. At the 2013 European Volleyball Championship - where Russia won the gold medal and was awarded as the best setter of the tournament.

In August 2025, at 40, he signed for Sporting Portugal, the national title holder in its country.

== Sporting achievements ==
=== Clubs ===
- CEV Champions League
  - 2009/2010 – with Dynamo Moscow
- CEV Cup
  - 2011/2012 – with Dynamo Moscow
  - 2014/2015 – with Dynamo Moscow
  - 2017/2018 – with Belogorie Belgorod
- National championships
  - 2006/2007 Russian Cup, with Dynamo Moscow
  - 2007/2008 Russian Championship, with Dynamo Moscow
  - 2008/2009 Russian SuperCup, with Dynamo Moscow
  - 2008/2009 Russian Cup, with Dynamo Moscow
  - 2009/2010 Russian SuperCup, with Dynamo Moscow
  - 2018/2019 German Championship, with Berlin Recycling Volleys
  - 2019/2020 German SuperCup, with Berlin Recycling Volleys
  - 2019/2020 German Cup, with Berlin Recycling Volleys
  - 2020/2021 German SuperCup, with Berlin Recycling Volleys
  - 2020/2021 German Championship, with Berlin Recycling Volleys
  - 2021/2022 German SuperCup, with Berlin Recycling Volleys
  - 2021/2022 German Championship, with Berlin Recycling Volleys

=== Individual awards ===
- 2003: CEV U19 European Championship – Best Setter
- 2010: FIVB World League – Best Setter
- 2013: CEV European Championship – Best Setter
- 2017: CEV European Championship – Best Setter

Awards
Preceded by (Serbia) Nikola Grbić	Best Setter of FIVB World League; 2010	Succeeded by (Argentina) Luciano De Cecco
Preceded by (Italy) Dragan Travica (Italy) Simone Giannelli	Best Setter of CEV European Championship; 2013; 2017	Succeeded by (Italy) Simone Giannelli (France) Benjamin Toniutti
