= 2011 FIVB Volleyball World League =

International sport competition

2011 World League
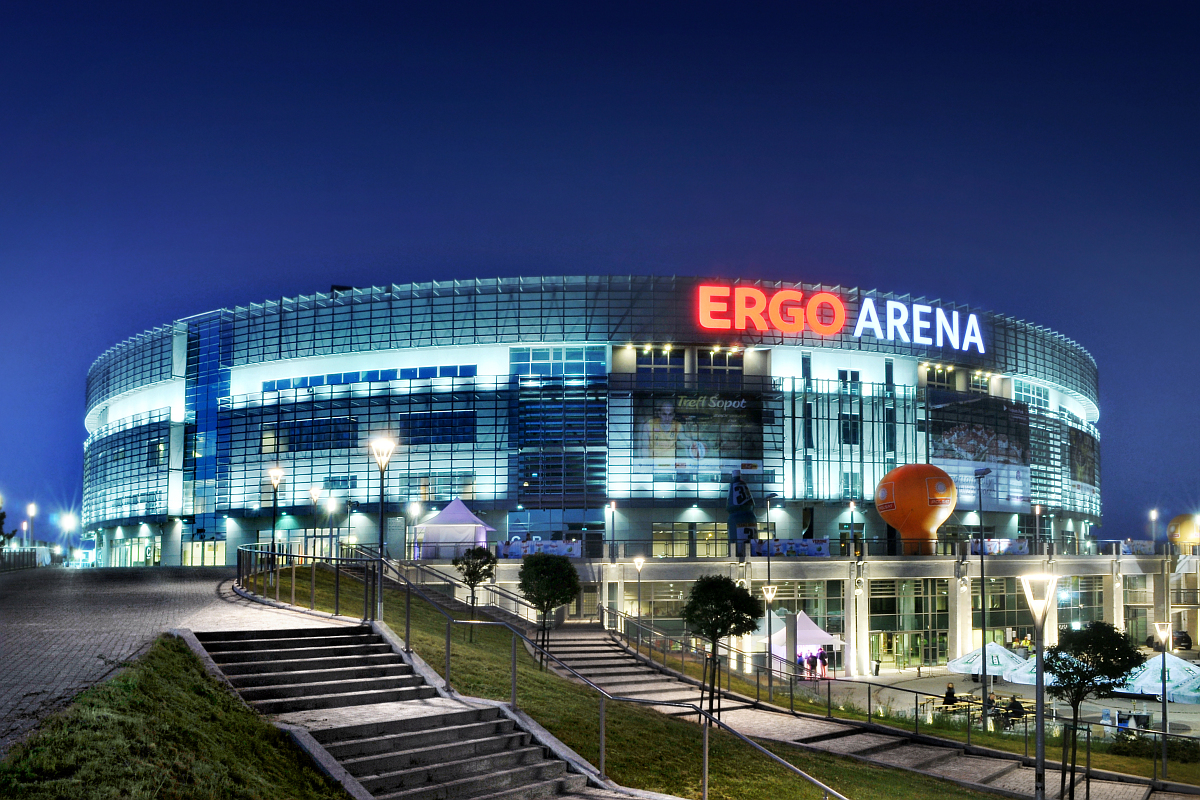
- The Ergo Arena hosted the final

Tournament details
- Host country: Poland
- City: Gdańsk (Final)
- Dates: 27 May – 10 July
- Teams: 16 (from 5 confederations)
- Venues: 47 (in 47 host cities)

Final positions
- Champions: Russia (2nd title)
- Runners-up: Brazil
- Third place: Poland
- Fourth place: Argentina

Tournament awards
- MVP: (Russia) Maxim Mikhaylov

The 2011 FIVB Volleyball World League was the 22nd edition of the annual men's international volleyball tournament, played by 16 countries from 27 May to 10 July 2011. The Final Round was held in Gdańsk, Poland.

== Qualification ==
- Top 14 teams of the 2010 edition directly qualified.
- South Korea and Puerto Rico qualified through the qualification.
- Japan replaced Netherlands, who withdrew from the tournament.
- Portugal replaced Egypt, who withdrew from the tournament.

| Asia and Oceania | Europe | North America | South America |
|---|---|---|---|
| Japan; South Korea | Bulgaria; Finland; France; Germany; Italy Poland; Portugal; Russia; Serbia | Cuba; Puerto Rico; United States | Argentina; Brazil |

== Pools composition ==
| Pool A | Pool B | Pool C | Pool D |
|---|---|---|---|
| Brazil | Russia | Serbia | Cuba |
| Poland | Bulgaria | Argentina | Italy |
| United States | Germany | Finland | France |
| Puerto Rico | Japan | Portugal | South Korea |

== Pool standing procedure ==
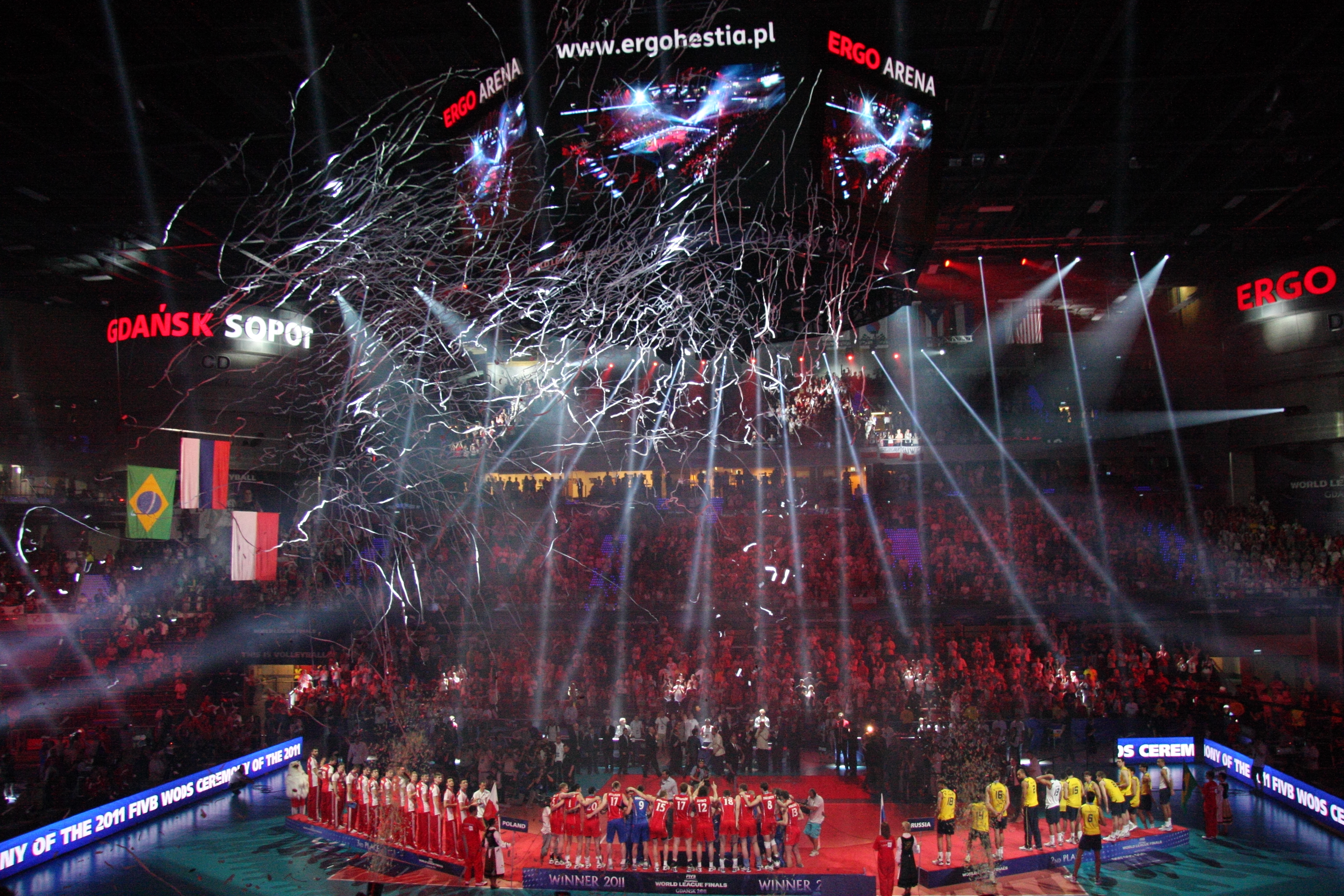
World League Final

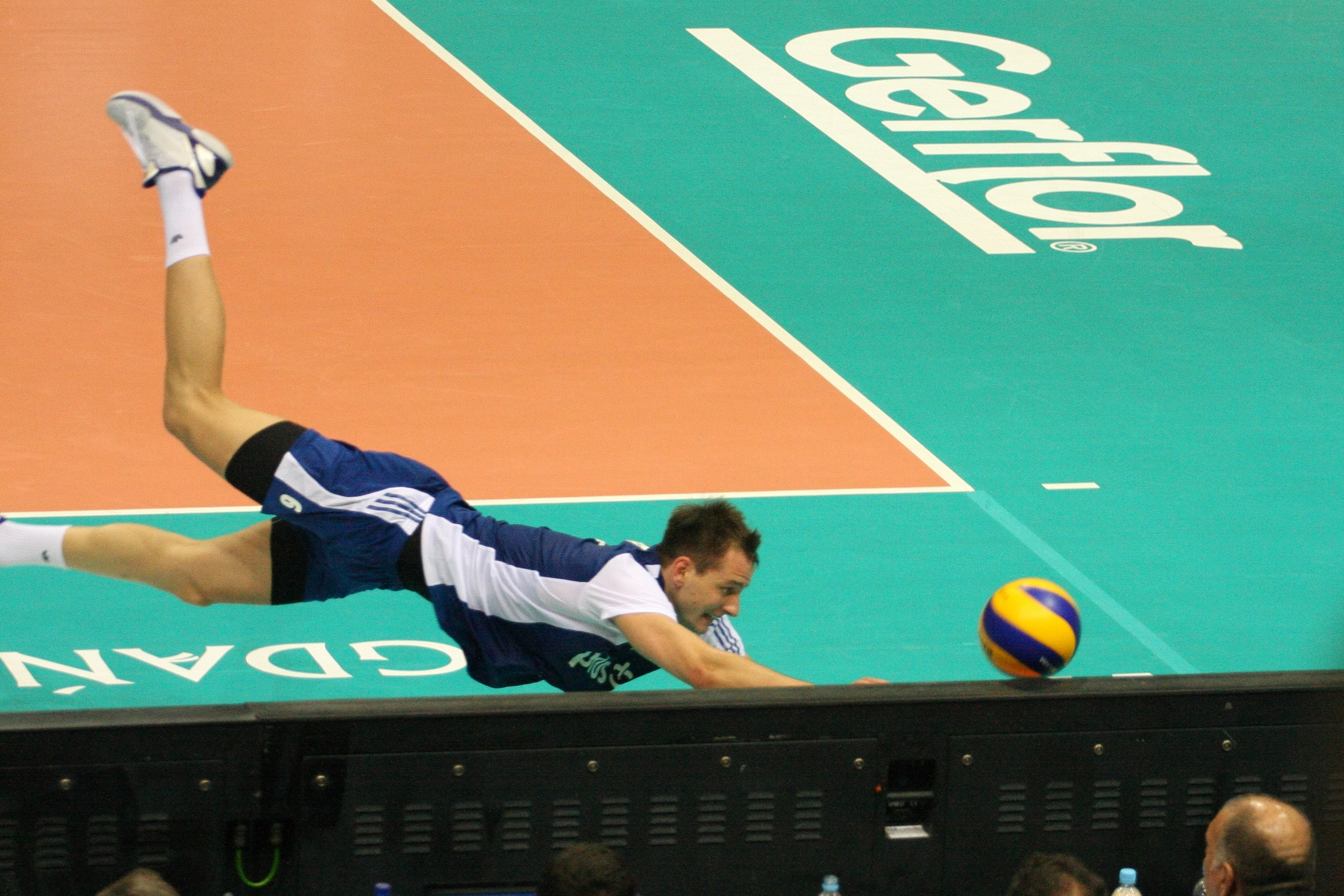
World League Finals Day 3

1. Match points
2. Number of matches won
3. Sets ratio
4. Points ratio
5. Result of the last match between the tied teams

Match won 3–0 or 3–1: 3 match points for the winner, 0 match points for the loser
Match won 3–2: 2 match points for the winner, 1 match point for the loser

== Intercontinental round ==
- All times are local.
- The top two teams in each pool will qualify for the Final Round. If the Final Round hosts Poland finish lower than second in Pool A, they will still qualify along with the best three second place teams across all four pools.

=== Pool A ===
| Pos | Team | Pld | W | L | Pts | SW | SL | SR | SPW | SPL | SPR | Qualification |
|---|---|---|---|---|---|---|---|---|---|---|---|---|
| 1 | Brazil | 12 | 10 | 2 | 30 | 32 | 10 | 3.200 | 1026 | 890 | 1.153 | Final round |
| 2 | United States | 12 | 8 | 4 | 23 | 26 | 19 | 1.368 | 1050 | 1006 | 1.044 | Final round |
| 3 | Poland (Note: Qualified as hosts) (H) | 12 | 6 | 6 | 18 | 21 | 19 | 1.105 | 945 | 914 | 1.034 | Final round |
| 4 | Puerto Rico | 12 | 0 | 12 | 1 | 5 | 36 | 0.139 | 813 | 1024 | 0.794 | |

(H) Host

==== Week 1 ====
| Date | Time | | Score | | Set 1 | Set 2 | Set 3 | Set 4 | Set 5 | Total | Report |
|---|---|---|---|---|---|---|---|---|---|---|---|
| 27 May | 20:40 | Poland | 3–0 | United States | 25–20 | 25–22 | 25–19 | | | 75–61 | P2 P3 |
| 27 May | 20:31 | Puerto Rico | 0–3 | Brazil | 15–25 | 19–25 | 16–25 | | | 50–75 | P2 P3 |
| 28 May | 17:10 | Poland | 0–3 | United States | 22–25 | 19–25 | 35–37 | | | 76–87 | P2 P3 |
| 28 May | 20:40 | Puerto Rico | 0–3 | Brazil | 19–25 | 29–31 | 23–25 | | | 71–81 | P2 P3 |

==== Week 2 ====
| Date | Time | | Score | | Set 1 | Set 2 | Set 3 | Set 4 | Set 5 | Total | Report |
|---|---|---|---|---|---|---|---|---|---|---|---|
| 3 Jun | 20:37 | Puerto Rico | 1–3 | United States | 26–24 | 27–29 | 17–25 | 17–25 | | 87–103 | P2 P3 |
| 4 Jun | 10:10 | Brazil | 3–0 | Poland | 25–23 | 26–24 | 25–21 | | | 76–68 | P2 P3 |
| 4 Jun | 20:40 | Puerto Rico | 1–3 | United States | 23–25 | 24–26 | 25–22 | 12–25 | | 84–98 | P2 P3 |
| 5 Jun | 10:10 | Brazil | 3–1 | Poland | 28–26 | 23–25 | 26–24 | 25–23 | | 102–98 | P2 P3 |

==== Week 3 ====
| Date | Time | | Score | | Set 1 | Set 2 | Set 3 | Set 4 | Set 5 | Total | Report |
|---|---|---|---|---|---|---|---|---|---|---|---|
| 10 Jun | 20:40 | Puerto Rico | 0–3 | Poland | 21–25 | 23–25 | 14–25 | | | 58–75 | P2 P3 |
| 11 Jun | 10:00 | Brazil | 3–1 | United States | 19–25 | 25–21 | 25–19 | 25–21 | | 94–86 | P2 P3 |
| 11 Jun | 20:40 | Puerto Rico | 0–3 | Poland | 22–25 | 15–25 | 21–25 | | | 58–75 | P2 P3 |
| 12 Jun | 09:50 | Brazil | 1–3 | United States | 21–25 | 22–25 | 25–16 | 24–26 | | 92–92 | P2 P3 |

==== Week 4 ====
| Date | Time | | Score | | Set 1 | Set 2 | Set 3 | Set 4 | Set 5 | Total | Report |
|---|---|---|---|---|---|---|---|---|---|---|---|
| 17 Jun | 19:00 | United States | 0–3 | Poland | 22–25 | 19–25 | 20–25 | | | 61–75 | P2 P3 |
| 18 Jun | 10:00 | Brazil | 3–0 | Puerto Rico | 25–20 | 25–10 | 25–23 | | | 75–53 | P2 P3 |
| 18 Jun | 19:00 | United States | 3–1 | Poland | 25–21 | 15–25 | 25–18 | 25–22 | | 90–86 | P2 P3 |
| 19 Jun | 10:00 | Brazil | 3–0 | Puerto Rico | 25–10 | 25–20 | 25–20 | | | 75–50 | P2 P3 |

==== Week 5 ====
| Date | Time | | Score | | Set 1 | Set 2 | Set 3 | Set 4 | Set 5 | Total | Report |
|---|---|---|---|---|---|---|---|---|---|---|---|
| 24 Jun | 20:40 | Poland | 3–1 | Puerto Rico | 24–26 | 28–26 | 25–22 | 25–17 | | 102–91 | P2 P3 |
| 24 Jun | 19:10 | United States | 1–3 | Brazil | 21–25 | 20–25 | 25–21 | 19–25 | | 85–96 | P2 P3 |
| 25 Jun | 17:10 | Poland | 3–0 | Puerto Rico | 25–19 | 25–22 | 25–20 | | | 75–61 | P2 P3 |
| 25 Jun | 19:10 | United States | 3–1 | Brazil | 25–20 | 25–23 | 22–25 | 25–23 | | 97–91 | P2 P3 |

==== Week 6 ====
| Date | Time | | Score | | Set 1 | Set 2 | Set 3 | Set 4 | Set 5 | Total | Report |
|---|---|---|---|---|---|---|---|---|---|---|---|
| 29 Jun | 20:40 | Poland | 1–3 | Brazil | 23–25 | 25–18 | 16–25 | 24–26 | | 88–94 | P2 P3 |
| 30 Jun | 20:40 | Poland | 0–3 | Brazil | 17–25 | 14–25 | 21–25 | | | 52–75 | P2 P3 |
| 1 Jul | 19:10 | United States | 3–2 | Puerto Rico | 25–27 | 25–22 | 25–12 | 25–27 | 15–8 | 115–96 | P2 P3 |
| 2 Jul | 19:10 | United States | 3–0 | Puerto Rico | 25–13 | 25–22 | 25–19 | | | 75–54 | P2 P3 |

=== Pool B ===
| Pos | Team | Pld | W | L | Pts | SW | SL | SR | SPW | SPL | SPR | Qualification |
|---|---|---|---|---|---|---|---|---|---|---|---|---|
| 1 | Russia | 12 | 11 | 1 | 31 | 34 | 9 | 3.778 | 1046 | 857 | 1.221 | Final round |
| 2 | Bulgaria | 12 | 7 | 5 | 22 | 27 | 22 | 1.227 | 1057 | 1045 | 1.011 | Final round |
| 3 | Germany | 12 | 5 | 7 | 15 | 23 | 28 | 0.821 | 1111 | 1127 | 0.986 | |
| 4 | Japan | 12 | 1 | 11 | 4 | 10 | 35 | 0.286 | 884 | 1069 | 0.827 | |

==== Week 1 ====
| Date | Time | | Score | | Set 1 | Set 2 | Set 3 | Set 4 | Set 5 | Total | Report |
|---|---|---|---|---|---|---|---|---|---|---|---|
| 27 May | 18:10 | Russia | 3–0 | Japan | 25–22 | 25–20 | 25–18 | | | 75–60 | P2 P3 |
| 28 May | 18:10 | Russia | 3–1 | Japan | 22–25 | 25–19 | 25–12 | 25–12 | | 97–68 | P2 P3 |
| 28 May | 18:10 | Bulgaria | 2–3 | Germany | 25–21 | 18–25 | 21–25 | 25–15 | 10–15 | 99–101 | P2 P3 |
| 29 May | 18:10 | Bulgaria | 3–2 | Germany | 25–21 | 23–25 | 25–22 | 20–25 | 15–9 | 108–102 | P2 P3 |

==== Week 2 ====
| Date | Time | | Score | | Set 1 | Set 2 | Set 3 | Set 4 | Set 5 | Total | Report |
|---|---|---|---|---|---|---|---|---|---|---|---|
| 3 Jun | 18:10 | Russia | 3–0 | Germany | 29–27 | 25–23 | 25–23 | | | 79–73 | P2 P3 |
| 4 Jun | 18:10 | Russia | 3–0 | Germany | 25–23 | 25–15 | 25–22 | | | 75–60 | P2 P3 |
| 4 Jun | 18:10 | Bulgaria | 3–1 | Japan | 22–25 | 25–21 | 25–16 | 25–20 | | 97–82 | P2 P3 |
| 5 Jun | 18:10 | Bulgaria | 3–0 | Japan | 25–14 | 25–17 | 25–19 | | | 75–50 | P2 P3 |

==== Week 3 ====
| Date | Time | | Score | | Set 1 | Set 2 | Set 3 | Set 4 | Set 5 | Total | Report |
|---|---|---|---|---|---|---|---|---|---|---|---|
| 10 Jun | 18:10 | Russia | 3–0 | Bulgaria | 25–15 | 25–20 | 25–18 | | | 75–53 | P2 P3 |
| 11 Jun | 18:10 | Russia | 3–0 | Bulgaria | 25–14 | 27–25 | 25–20 | | | 77–59 | P2 P3 |
| 11 Jun | 19:10 | Germany | 3–2 | Japan | 20–25 | 23–25 | 25–23 | 25–11 | 18–16 | 111–100 | P2 P3 |
| 12 Jun | 20:10 | Germany | 2–3 | Japan | 21–25 | 22–25 | 29–27 | 25–19 | 14–16 | 111–112 | P2 P3 |

==== Week 4 ====
| Date | Time | | Score | | Set 1 | Set 2 | Set 3 | Set 4 | Set 5 | Total | Report |
|---|---|---|---|---|---|---|---|---|---|---|---|
| 18 Jun | 18:10 | Russia | 3–0 | Japan | 25–22 | 25–15 | 25–20 | | | 75–57 | P2 P3 |
| 18 Jun | 18:10 | Germany | 3–2 | Bulgaria | 25–18 | 25–21 | 18–25 | 18–25 | 15–13 | 101–102 | P2 P3 |
| 19 Jun | 18:10 | Russia | 3–0 | Japan | 25–15 | 25–18 | 25–21 | | | 75–54 | P2 P3 |
| 19 Jun | 18:10 | Germany | 1–3 | Bulgaria | 24–26 | 22–25 | 25–20 | 23–25 | | 94–96 | P2 P3 |

==== Week 5 ====
| Date | Time | | Score | | Set 1 | Set 2 | Set 3 | Set 4 | Set 5 | Total | Report |
|---|---|---|---|---|---|---|---|---|---|---|---|
| 23 Jun | 19:40 | Germany | 2–3 | Russia | 14–25 | 25–22 | 25–21 | 23–25 | 7–15 | 94–108 | P2 P3 |
| 24 Jun | 19:40 | Germany | 1–3 | Russia | 29–27 | 20–25 | 17–25 | 26–28 | | 92–105 | P2 P3 |
| 25 Jun | 18:10 | Bulgaria | 3–0 | Japan | 25–20 | 25–21 | 25–23 | | | 75–64 | P2 P3 |
| 26 Jun | 18:10 | Bulgaria | 3–2 | Japan | 25–21 | 20–25 | 25–13 | 21–25 | 15–10 | 106–94 | P2 P3 |

==== Week 6 ====
| Date | Time | | Score | | Set 1 | Set 2 | Set 3 | Set 4 | Set 5 | Total | Report |
|---|---|---|---|---|---|---|---|---|---|---|---|
| 30 Jun | 18:10 | Bulgaria | 3–1 | Russia | 25–22 | 18–25 | 30–28 | 25–20 | | 98–95 | P2 P3 |
| 30 Jun | 18:40 | Germany | 3–1 | Japan | 22–25 | 25–21 | 25–20 | 25–21 | | 97–87 | P2 P3 |
| 1 Jul | 18:10 | Bulgaria | 2–3 | Russia | 14–25 | 25–23 | 13–25 | 25–22 | 12–15 | 89–110 | P2 P3 |
| 1 Jul | 19:10 | Germany | 3–0 | Japan | 25–14 | 25–22 | 25–20 | | | 75–56 | P2 P3 |

=== Pool C ===
| Pos | Team | Pld | W | L | Pts | SW | SL | SR | SPW | SPL | SPR | Qualification |
|---|---|---|---|---|---|---|---|---|---|---|---|---|
| 1 | Argentina | 12 | 9 | 3 | 25 | 29 | 15 | 1.933 | 1003 | 958 | 1.047 | Final round |
| 2 | Serbia | 12 | 7 | 5 | 21 | 26 | 21 | 1.238 | 1111 | 1035 | 1.073 | |
| 3 | Finland | 12 | 5 | 7 | 17 | 24 | 27 | 0.889 | 1115 | 1148 | 0.971 | |
| 4 | Portugal | 12 | 3 | 9 | 9 | 16 | 32 | 0.500 | 1028 | 1116 | 0.921 | |

==== Week 1 ====
| Date | Time | | Score | | Set 1 | Set 2 | Set 3 | Set 4 | Set 5 | Total | Report |
|---|---|---|---|---|---|---|---|---|---|---|---|
| 28 May | 16:00 | Portugal | 3–2 | Finland | 23–25 | 27–25 | 25–21 | 24–26 | 15–13 | 114–110 | P2 P3 |
| 28 May | 18:10 | Argentina | 0–3 | Serbia | 14–25 | 21–25 | 22–25 | | | 57–75 | P2 P3 |
| 29 May | 16:00 | Portugal | 3–1 | Finland | 25–18 | 23–25 | 25–21 | 25–23 | | 98–87 | P2 P3 |
| 29 May | 18:10 | Argentina | 3–0 | Serbia | 25–21 | 26–24 | 25–20 | | | 76–65 | P2 P3 |

==== Week 2 ====
| Date | Time | | Score | | Set 1 | Set 2 | Set 3 | Set 4 | Set 5 | Total | Report |
|---|---|---|---|---|---|---|---|---|---|---|---|
| 3 Jun | 20:10 | Serbia | 1–3 | Finland | 27–25 | 24–26 | 20–25 | 25–27 | | 96–103 | P2 P3 |
| 3 Jun | 21:30 | Portugal | 0–3 | Argentina | 21–25 | 20–25 | 19–25 | | | 60–75 | P2 P3 |
| 4 Jun | 16:00 | Portugal | 1–3 | Argentina | 23–25 | 21–25 | 25–14 | 22–25 | | 91–89 | P2 P3 |
| 4 Jun | 20:10 | Serbia | 3–0 | Finland | 25–21 | 25–15 | 25–21 | | | 75–57 | P2 P3 |

==== Week 3 ====
| Date | Time | | Score | | Set 1 | Set 2 | Set 3 | Set 4 | Set 5 | Total | Report |
|---|---|---|---|---|---|---|---|---|---|---|---|
| 10 Jun | 19:10 | Finland | 2–3 | Argentina | 17–25 | 25–21 | 20–25 | 25–23 | 10–15 | 97–109 | P2 P3 |
| 10 Jun | 20:10 | Serbia | 2–3 | Portugal | 22–25 | 25–19 | 26–28 | 25–23 | 13–15 | 111–110 | P2 P3 |
| 11 Jun | 19:10 | Finland | 0–3 | Argentina | 21–25 | 24–26 | 19–25 | | | 64–76 | P2 P3 |
| 11 Jun | 20:10 | Serbia | 3–0 | Portugal | 26–24 | 25–18 | 29–27 | | | 80–69 | P2 P3 |

==== Week 4 ====
| Date | Time | | Score | | Set 1 | Set 2 | Set 3 | Set 4 | Set 5 | Total | Report |
|---|---|---|---|---|---|---|---|---|---|---|---|
| 17 Jun | 18:40 | Finland | 2–3 | Serbia | 20–25 | 25–23 | 17–25 | 36–34 | 11–15 | 109–122 | P2 P3 |
| 18 Jun | 18:40 | Finland | 3–2 | Serbia | 25–23 | 25–23 | 22–25 | 20–25 | 15–11 | 107–107 | P2 P3 |
| 18 Jun | 21:00 | Argentina | 3–1 | Portugal | 25–16 | 25–17 | 22–25 | 26–24 | | 98–82 | P2 P3 |
| 19 Jun | 18:00 | Argentina | 3–0 | Portugal | 25–19 | 25–18 | 25–17 | | | 75–54 | P2 P3 |

==== Week 5 ====
| Date | Time | | Score | | Set 1 | Set 2 | Set 3 | Set 4 | Set 5 | Total | Report |
|---|---|---|---|---|---|---|---|---|---|---|---|
| 23 Jun | 21:16 | Argentina | 3–2 | Finland | 21–25 | 25–17 | 19–25 | 26–24 | 15–11 | 106–102 | P2 P3 |
| 24 Jun | 21:10 | Argentina | 1–3 | Finland | 14–25 | 17–25 | 25–23 | 26–28 | | 82–101 | P2 P3 |
| 25 Jun | 16:00 | Portugal | 2–3 | Serbia | 21–25 | 25–19 | 31–29 | 17–25 | 11–15 | 105–113 | P2 P3 |
| 26 Jun | 16:10 | Portugal | 1–3 | Serbia | 14–25 | 27–25 | 19–25 | 22–25 | | 82–100 | P2 P3 |

==== Week 6 ====
| Date | Time | | Score | | Set 1 | Set 2 | Set 3 | Set 4 | Set 5 | Total | Report |
|---|---|---|---|---|---|---|---|---|---|---|---|
| 29 Jun | 20:10 | Serbia | 3–1 | Argentina | 25–18 | 23–25 | 25–18 | 25–22 | | 98–83 | P2 P3 |
| 30 Jun | 18:40 | Finland | 3–2 | Portugal | 22–25 | 16–25 | 25–19 | 25–17 | 15–13 | 103–99 | P2 P3 |
| 30 Jun | 20:10 | Serbia | 0–3 | Argentina | 23–25 | 25–27 | 21–25 | | | 69–77 | P2 P3 |
| 1 Jul | 18:40 | Finland | 3–0 | Portugal | 25–21 | 25–21 | 25–22 | | | 75–64 | P2 P3 |

=== Pool D ===
| Pos | Team | Pld | W | L | Pts | SW | SL | SR | SPW | SPL | SPR | Qualification |
|---|---|---|---|---|---|---|---|---|---|---|---|---|
| 1 | Italy | 12 | 10 | 2 | 28 | 31 | 12 | 2.583 | 1039 | 898 | 1.157 | Final round |
| 2 | Cuba | 12 | 8 | 4 | 23 | 26 | 19 | 1.368 | 1048 | 1016 | 1.031 | Final round |
| 3 | France | 12 | 3 | 9 | 11 | 18 | 29 | 0.621 | 1042 | 1106 | 0.942 | |
| 4 | South Korea | 12 | 3 | 9 | 10 | 14 | 29 | 0.483 | 905 | 1014 | 0.893 | |

==== Week 1 ====
| Date | Time | | Score | | Set 1 | Set 2 | Set 3 | Set 4 | Set 5 | Total | Report |
|---|---|---|---|---|---|---|---|---|---|---|---|
| 27 May | 20:40 | France | 0–3 | Italy | 14–25 | 20–25 | 12–25 | | | 46–75 | P2 P3 |
| 28 May | 14:10 | South Korea | 3–0 | Cuba | 25–20 | 29–27 | 25–18 | | | 79–65 | P2 P3 |
| 29 May | 14:10 | South Korea | 1–3 | Cuba | 25–21 | 23–25 | 18–25 | 18–25 | | 84–96 | P2 P3 |
| 29 May | 17:40 | France | 0–3 | Italy | 15–25 | 23–25 | 25–27 | | | 63–77 | P2 P3 |

==== Week 2 ====
| Date | Time | | Score | | Set 1 | Set 2 | Set 3 | Set 4 | Set 5 | Total | Report |
|---|---|---|---|---|---|---|---|---|---|---|---|
| 2 Jun | 18:40 | Italy | 3–0 | Cuba | 25–19 | 25–21 | 27–25 | | | 77–65 | P2 P3 |
| 4 Jun | 14:10 | South Korea | 3–1 | France | 25–21 | 24–26 | 25–20 | 25–16 | | 99–83 | P2 P3 |
| 5 Jun | 14:10 | South Korea | 3–1 | France | 27–25 | 19–25 | 25–23 | 25–16 | | 96–89 | P2 P3 |
| 5 Jun | 20:10 | Italy | 3–2 | Cuba | 25–14 | 23–25 | 25–17 | 22–25 | 18–16 | 113–97 | P2 P3 |

==== Week 3 ====
| Date | Time | | Score | | Set 1 | Set 2 | Set 3 | Set 4 | Set 5 | Total | Report |
|---|---|---|---|---|---|---|---|---|---|---|---|
| 9 Jun | 20:40 | France | 1–3 | Cuba | 27–29 | 27–25 | 23–25 | 31–33 | | 108–112 | P2 P3 |
| 11 Jun | 14:10 | South Korea | 1–3 | Italy | 25–23 | 19–25 | 21–25 | 20–25 | | 85–98 | P2 P3 |
| 11 Jun | 20:10 | France | 2–3 | Cuba | 25–23 | 21–25 | 25–22 | 22–25 | 9–15 | 102–110 | P2 P3 |
| 12 Jun | 14:10 | South Korea | 2–3 | Italy | 15–25 | 22–25 | 25–21 | 25–22 | 10–15 | 97–108 | P2 P3 |

==== Week 4 ====
| Date | Time | | Score | | Set 1 | Set 2 | Set 3 | Set 4 | Set 5 | Total | Report |
|---|---|---|---|---|---|---|---|---|---|---|---|
| 17 Jun | 20:10 | Italy | 1–3 | France | 25–21 | 30–32 | 23–25 | 22–25 | | 100–103 | P2 P3 |
| 18 Jun | 14:10 | South Korea | 0–3 | Cuba | 20–25 | 22–25 | 20–25 | | | 62–75 | P2 P3 |
| 18 Jun | 20:40 | Italy | 3–1 | France | 25–20 | 18–25 | 25–22 | 25–17 | | 93–84 | P2 P3 |
| 19 Jun | 14:10 | South Korea | 0–3 | Cuba | 23–25 | 13–25 | 18–25 | | | 54–75 | P2 P3 |

==== Week 5 ====
| Date | Time | | Score | | Set 1 | Set 2 | Set 3 | Set 4 | Set 5 | Total | Report |
|---|---|---|---|---|---|---|---|---|---|---|---|
| 24 Jun | 20:10 | Italy | 3–0 | South Korea | 25–18 | 25–21 | 25–20 | | | 75–59 | P2 P3 |
| 24 Jun | 20:40 | France | 2–3 | Cuba | 25–21 | 22–25 | 25–21 | 22–25 | 12–15 | 106–107 | P2 P3 |
| 26 Jun | 19:10 | France | 1–3 | Cuba | 25–21 | 20–25 | 15–25 | 23–25 | | 83–96 | P2 P3 |
| 26 Jun | 21:10 | Italy | 3–0 | South Korea | 25–15 | 25–13 | 25–21 | | | 75–49 | P2 P3 |

==== Week 6 ====
| Date | Time | | Score | | Set 1 | Set 2 | Set 3 | Set 4 | Set 5 | Total | Report |
|---|---|---|---|---|---|---|---|---|---|---|---|
| 29 Jun | 20:10 | France | 3–1 | South Korea | 23–25 | 27–25 | 25–16 | 25–15 | | 100–81 | P2 P3 |
| 29 Jun | 20:40 | Italy | 3–0 | Cuba | 25–21 | 25–22 | 32–30 | | | 82–73 | P2 P3 |
| 1 Jul | 20:40 | Italy | 0–3 | Cuba | 21–25 | 20–25 | 25–27 | | | 66–77 | P2 P3 |
| 1 Jul | 20:40 | France | 3–0 | South Korea | 25–20 | 25–18 | 25–22 | | | 75–60 | P2 P3 |

== Final round ==
- Venue: Ergo Arena, Gdańsk, Poland
- All times are Central European Summer Time (UTC+02:00).

=== Pool play ===
==== Pool E ====
| Pos | Team | Pld | W | L | Pts | SW | SL | SR | SPW | SPL | SPR | Qualification |
|---|---|---|---|---|---|---|---|---|---|---|---|---|
| 1 | Argentina | 3 | 2 | 1 | 7 | 8 | 4 | 2.000 | 276 | 257 | 1.074 | Semifinals |
| 2 | Poland | 3 | 2 | 1 | 4 | 6 | 7 | 0.857 | 264 | 286 | 0.923 | Semifinals |
| 3 | Bulgaria | 3 | 1 | 2 | 4 | 5 | 6 | 0.833 | 241 | 242 | 0.996 | |
| 4 | Italy | 3 | 1 | 2 | 3 | 4 | 6 | 0.667 | 229 | 225 | 1.018 | |

| Date | Time | | Score | | Set 1 | Set 2 | Set 3 | Set 4 | Set 5 | Total | Report |
|---|---|---|---|---|---|---|---|---|---|---|---|
| 6 Jul | 17:25 | Argentina | 3–1 | Italy | 20–25 | 25–20 | 25–22 | 25–22 | | 95–89 | P2 P3 |
| 6 Jul | 20:10 | Poland | 3–2 | Bulgaria | 25–20 | 23–25 | 14–25 | 25–22 | 15–13 | 102–105 | P2 P3 |
| 7 Jul | 17:25 | Bulgaria | 0–3 | Argentina | 17–25 | 22–25 | 22–25 | | | 61–75 | P2 P3 |
| 7 Jul | 20:10 | Italy | 3–0 | Poland | 25–15 | 25–20 | 25–20 | | | 75–55 | P2 P3 |
| 8 Jul | 17:25 | Italy | 0–3 | Bulgaria | 22–25 | 22–25 | 21–25 | | | 65–75 | P2 P3 |
| 8 Jul | 20:10 | Poland | 3–2 | Argentina | 18–25 | 25–22 | 25–20 | 24–26 | 15–13 | 107–106 | P2 P3 |

==== Pool F ====
| Pos | Team | Pld | W | L | Pts | SW | SL | SR | SPW | SPL | SPR | Qualification |
|---|---|---|---|---|---|---|---|---|---|---|---|---|
| 1 | Russia | 3 | 3 | 0 | 9 | 9 | 1 | 9.000 | 254 | 207 | 1.227 | Semifinals |
| 2 | Brazil | 3 | 2 | 1 | 5 | 6 | 6 | 1.000 | 256 | 265 | 0.966 | Semifinals |
| 3 | United States | 3 | 1 | 2 | 2 | 5 | 8 | 0.625 | 283 | 296 | 0.956 | |
| 4 | Cuba | 3 | 0 | 3 | 2 | 4 | 9 | 0.444 | 268 | 293 | 0.915 | |

| Date | Time | | Score | | Set 1 | Set 2 | Set 3 | Set 4 | Set 5 | Total | Report |
|---|---|---|---|---|---|---|---|---|---|---|---|
| 6 Jul | 11:10 | Russia | 3–1 | United States | 29–31 | 25–16 | 25–21 | 25–22 | | 104–90 | P2 P3 |
| 6 Jul | 13:40 | Brazil | 3–2 | Cuba | 18–25 | 21–25 | 25–16 | 30–28 | 15–12 | 109–106 | P2 P3 |
| 7 Jul | 11:10 | Cuba | 0–3 | Russia | 20–25 | 20–25 | 20–25 | | | 60–75 | P2 P3 |
| 7 Jul | 13:40 | United States | 1–3 | Brazil | 25–15 | 22–25 | 22–25 | 15–25 | | 84–90 | P2 P3 |
| 8 Jul | 11:10 | United States | 3–2 | Cuba | 23–25 | 25–21 | 25–18 | 21–25 | 15–13 | 109–102 | P2 P3 |
| 8 Jul | 13:55 | Brazil | 0–3 | Russia | 20–25 | 20–25 | 17–25 | | | 57–75 | P2 P3 |

=== Final four ===
Semifinals
9 July
Argentina | 0
Brazil | 3
9 July
Russia | 3
Poland | 1

Final
10 July
Brazil | 2
Russia | 3
3rd place match
10 July
Argentina | 0
Poland | 3

==== Semifinals ====
| Date | Time | | Score | | Set 1 | Set 2 | Set 3 | Set 4 | Set 5 | Total | Report |
|---|---|---|---|---|---|---|---|---|---|---|---|
| 9 Jul | 17:10 | Argentina | 0–3 | Brazil | 22–25 | 40–42 | 23–25 | | | 85–92 | P2 P3 |
| 9 Jul | 20:00 | Russia | 3–1 | Poland | 25–22 | 25–23 | 22–25 | 25–17 | | 97–87 | P2 P3 |

==== 3rd place match ====
| Date | Time | | Score | | Set 1 | Set 2 | Set 3 | Set 4 | Set 5 | Total | Report |
|---|---|---|---|---|---|---|---|---|---|---|---|
| 10 Jul | 17:10 | Argentina | 0–3 | Poland | 18–25 | 23–25 | 22–25 | | | 63–75 | P2 P3 |

==== Final ====
| Date | Time | | Score | | Set 1 | Set 2 | Set 3 | Set 4 | Set 5 | Total | Report |
|---|---|---|---|---|---|---|---|---|---|---|---|
| 10 Jul | 20:10 | Brazil | 2–3 | Russia | 25–23 | 25–27 | 23–25 | 25–22 | 11–15 | 109–112 | P2 P3 |

== Final standing ==
| Rank | Team |
|---|---|
| 1st place, gold medalist(s) | Russia |
| 2nd place, silver medalist(s) | Brazil |
| 3rd place, bronze medalist(s) | Poland |
| 4 | Argentina |
| 5 | Bulgaria |
| 6 | Italy |
| 7 | United States |
| 8 | Cuba |
| 9 | Serbia |
| 10 | Finland |
| 11 | Germany |
| 12 | France |
| 13 | South Korea |
| 14 | Portugal |
| 15 | Japan |
| 16 | Puerto Rico |

2011 World League champions

Russia
2nd title

14-man Roster for Final Round
Ilinykh, Apalikov, Khtey (c), Grankin, Biriukov, Sokolov, Berezhko, Butko, Muserskiy, Shcherbinin, Spiridonov, Mikhaylov, Volkov, Stepanyan
Head coach
Alekno

== Awards ==
- Most valuable player
  (Russia) Maxim Mikhaylov
- Best scorer
  (Poland) Bartosz Kurek
- Best spiker
  (Brazil) Théo Lopes
- Best blocker
  (Russia) Maxim Mikhaylov
- Best server
  (Russia) Dmitriy Muserskiy
- Best setter
  (Argentina) Luciano De Cecco
- Best receiver
  (Brazil) Murilo Endres
- Best libero
  (Poland) Krzysztof Ignaczak
