= Artem Ermakov =

Russian volleyball player (born 1982)

Personal information
- Full name: Artem Sergeyvich Ermakov
- Nationality: Russian
- Born: 16 March 1982 (age 44); Nizhnevartovsk, Russia, USSR
- Height: 1.88 m (6 ft 2 in)
- Weight: 80 kg (176 lb)
- Spike: 333 cm (131 in)
- Block: 313 cm (123 in)

Volleyball information
- Position: Libero
- Current club: Dinamo Moscow
- Number: 6

Career
Years	Teams
2001–2003; 2003–2005; 2005–2006; 2006–2007; 2007–2009; 2009–2010; 2010–2011; 2011–2013; 2013–	Yugra Nizhnevartovsk; Dinamo Moscow; Fakel Novy Urengoy; Ural Ufa; Zenit Kazan; Iskra Odintsovo; Ural Ufa; Belogorie Belgorod; Dinamo Moscow

National team
2006–	Russia
Honours
Men's volleyball
Representing Russia
World Grand Champions Cup
Silver medal – second place	2013 Japan
World League
Gold medal – first place	2013 Mar del Plata
European Championship
Gold medal – first place	2013 Denmark/Poland
European League
Silver medal – second place	2004 Czech Republic
- Last updated: 31 December 2017

Artem Sergeyvich Ermakov (Russian: Артём Сергеевич Ермаков; born 16 March 1982) is a Russian male volleyball player. He was part of the Russia men's national volleyball team at the 2014 FIVB Volleyball Men's World Championship in Poland. He played for Dinamo Moscow.
