= 2020–21 CEV Cup =

- League: CEV Cup
- Sport: Volleyball
- Duration: 12 November 2020 – 25 March 2021

Finals
- Champions: (Russia) Dynamo Moscow
- Runners-up: (Russia) Zenit Saint Petersburg
- Finals MVP: (Russia) Pavel Pankov

CEV Cup seasons
- ← 2019–20 2021–22 →

The 2020–21 CEV Cup was the 49th edition of the second most important European volleyball club competition organised by the European Volleyball Confederation.

== Participating teams ==
The number of participants on the basis of ranking list for European Cup Competitions:

Rank	Country	Number of teams	Teams
1	Turkey	2	Galatasaray HDI İstanbul, SK Ankara
2	Russia	2	Zenit Saint Petersburg, Dynamo Moscow
4	France	2	Montpellier Castelnau UC, Chaumont VB 52
5	Czech Republic	3	Jihostroj České Budějovice, Volejbal Brno, Dukla Liberec
6	Belgium	1	Greenyard Maaseik
7	Switzerland	3	Volley Schönenwerd, Chênois Genève, Lindaren Volley Amriswil
9	Bulgaria	3	Hebar Pazardzhik, Montana Volley, Neftochimik Burgas
11	Austria	1	SK Zadruga Aich/Dob
12	Finland	1	Ford Levoranta Sastamala
13	Netherlands	2	Amysoft Lycurgus Groningen, Draisma Dynamo Apeldoorn
14	Romania	1	CSM Arcada Galați
16	Serbia	3	OK Niš, Mladi Radnik Požarevac, Vojvodina Novi Sad
17	Belarus	2	Stroitel Minsk, Shakhtior Soligorsk
22	Croatia	2	Ribola Kaštela, Mladost Zagreb
27	Hungary	1	Fino Kaposvár
32	Spain	1	CV Guaguas Las Palmas
35	England	1	IBB Polonia London
36	Albania	1	Erzeni Shijakut

== Main phase ==
=== 16th Finals ===
Team 1	Agg.	Team 2	1st leg	2nd leg
CSM Arcada Galați (Romania)	4–2	(Bulgaria) Montana Volley	3–0	2–3
Ford Levoranta Sastamala (Finland)	W.O.	(Netherlands) Amysoft Lycurgus Groningen	Cancelled	Cancelled
Vojvodina Novi Sad (Serbia)	W.O.	(Switzerland) Chênois Genève	Cancelled	Cancelled
Dynamo Moscow (Russia)	W.O.	(Czech Republic) Jihostroj České Budějovice	Cancelled	Cancelled
IBB Polonia London (England)	W.O.	(Czech Republic) Volejbal Brno	Cancelled	Cancelled
Shakhtior Soligorsk (Belarus)	W.O.	(Serbia) OK Niš	Cancelled	Cancelled
Neftochimik Burgas (Bulgaria)	W.O.	(Serbia) Mladi Radnik Požarevac	Cancelled	Cancelled
Mladost Zagreb (Croatia)	0–3	(France) Montpellier Castelnau UC	1–3	Cancelled
Lindaren Volley Amriswil (Switzerland)	W.O.	(Russia) Zenit Saint Petersburg	Cancelled	Cancelled
Erzeni Shijakut (Albania)	0–6	(Bulgaria) Hebar Pazardzhik	0–3	0–3
SK Zadruga Aich/Dob (Austria)	2–4	(Czech Republic) Dukla Liberec	3–2	0–3
Stroitel Minsk (Belarus)	W.O.	(Switzerland) Volley Schönenwerd	Cancelled	Cancelled
Greenyard Maaseik (Belgium)	W.O.	(France) Chaumont VB 52	Cancelled	Cancelled
Draisma Dynamo Apeldoorn (Netherlands)	W.O.	(Turkey) SK Ankara	Cancelled	Cancelled
Fino Kaposvár (Hungary)	W.O.	(Spain) CV Guaguas Las Palmas	Cancelled	Cancelled
Ribola Kaštela (Croatia)	W.O.	(Turkey) Galatasaray HDI İstanbul	Cancelled	Cancelled

==== First leg ====
Date	Time		Score		Set 1	Set 2	Set 3	Set 4	Set 5	Total	Report
19 Nov	18:00	CSM Arcada Galați (Romania)	3–0	(Bulgaria) Montana Volley	25–18	25–20	25–23			75–61	Report
12 Nov	17:00	Mladost Zagreb (Croatia)	1–3	(France) Montpellier Castelnau UC	19–25	25–22	25–27	15–25		84–99	Report
17 Nov	18:30	Erzeni Shijakut (Albania)	0–3	(Bulgaria) Hebar Pazardzhik	18–25	21–25	17–25			56–75	Report
17 Nov	19:00	SK Zadruga Aich/Dob (Austria)	3–2	(Czech Republic) Dukla Liberec	25–21	25–19	24–26	19–25	15–13	108–104	Report

==== Second leg ====
Date	Time		Score		Set 1	Set 2	Set 3	Set 4	Set 5	Total	Report
24 Nov	18:00	Montana Volley (Bulgaria)	3–2	(Romania) CSM Arcada Galați	25–18	16–25	25–20	21–25	15–9	102–97	Report
18 Nov	18:30	Hebar Pazardzhik (Bulgaria)	3–0	(Albania) Erzeni Shijakut	25–11	25–20	25–9			75–40	Report
18 Nov	19:00	Dukla Liberec (Czech Republic)	3–0	(Austria) SK Zadruga Aich/Dob	25–21	25–19	25–18			75–58	Report

=== 8th Finals ===
Team 1	Score	Team 2
CSM Arcada Galați (Romania)	3–2	(Netherlands) Amysoft Lycurgus Groningen
Vojvodina Novi Sad (Serbia)	0–3	(Russia) Dynamo Moscow
IBB Polonia London (England)	1–3	(Serbia) OK Niš
Mladi Radnik Požarevac (Serbia)	0–3	(France) Montpellier Castelnau UC
Zenit Saint Petersburg (Russia)	3–1	(Bulgaria) Hebar Pazardzhik
Dukla Liberec (Czech Republic)	3–0	(Belarus) Stroitel Minsk
Greenyard Maaseik (Belgium)	3–0	(Turkey) SK Ankara
CV Guaguas Las Palmas (Spain)	3–1	(Turkey) Galatasaray HDI İstanbul

==== Group A ====
- Place: Moscow

Date	Time		Score		Set 1	Set 2	Set 3	Set 4	Set 5	Total	Report
16 Dec	16:00	CSM Arcada Galați (Romania)	3–2	(Netherlands) Amysoft Lycurgus Groningen	25–19	26–24	20–25	21–25	15–10	107–103	Report
16 Dec	19:00	Vojvodina Novi Sad (Serbia)	0–3	(Russia) Dynamo Moscow	22–25	17–25	25–27			64–77	Report

==== Group B ====
- Place: Montpellier

Date	Time		Score		Set 1	Set 2	Set 3	Set 4	Set 5	Total	Report
15 Dec	16:00	IBB Polonia London (England)	1–3	(Serbia) OK Niš	25–22	23–25	20–25	21–25		89–97	Report
15 Dec	20:00	Mladi Radnik Požarevac (Serbia)	0–3	(France) Montpellier Castelnau UC	14–25	12–25	20–25			46–75	Report

==== Group C ====
- Place: Pazardzhik

Date	Time		Score		Set 1	Set 2	Set 3	Set 4	Set 5	Total	Report
15 Dec	18:00	Zenit Saint Petersburg (Russia)	3–1	(Bulgaria) Hebar Pazardzhik	24–26	26–24	25–14	25–11		100–75	Report
15 Dec	21:00	Dukla Liberec (Czech Republic)	3–0	(Belarus) Stroitel Minsk	25–23	30–28	25–21			80–72	Report

==== Group D ====
- Place: Las Palmas

Date	Time		Score		Set 1	Set 2	Set 3	Set 4	Set 5	Total	Report
15 Dec	17:00	Greenyard Maaseik (Belgium)	3–0	(Turkey) SK Ankara	25–18	25–21	25–21			75–60	Report
15 Dec	20:00	CV Guaguas Las Palmas (Spain)	3–1	(Turkey) Galatasaray HDI İstanbul	25–23	27–25	21–25	25–18		98–91	Report

=== 4th Finals ===
Team 1	Score	Team 2
CSM Arcada Galați (Romania)	0–3	(Russia) Dynamo Moscow
OK Niš (Serbia)	0–3	(France) Montpellier Castelnau UC
Zenit Saint Petersburg (Russia)	3–0	(Czech Republic) Dukla Liberec
Greenyard Maaseik (Belgium)	3–2	(Spain) CV Guaguas Las Palmas

==== Group A ====
- Place: Moscow

Date	Time		Score		Set 1	Set 2	Set 3	Set 4	Set 5	Total	Report
17 Dec	19:00	CSM Arcada Galați (Romania)	0–3	(Russia) Dynamo Moscow	15–25	18–25	16–25			49–75	Report

==== Group B ====
- Place: Montpellier

Date	Time		Score		Set 1	Set 2	Set 3	Set 4	Set 5	Total	Report
17 Dec	18:00	OK Niš (Serbia)	0–3	(France) Montpellier Castelnau UC	22–25	19–25	14–25			55–75	Report

==== Group C ====
- Place: Pazardzhik

Date	Time		Score		Set 1	Set 2	Set 3	Set 4	Set 5	Total	Report
16 Dec	18:00	Zenit Saint Petersburg (Russia)	3–0	(Czech Republic) Dukla Liberec	26–24	25–14	25–22			76–60	Report

==== Group D ====
- Place: Las Palmas

Date	Time		Score		Set 1	Set 2	Set 3	Set 4	Set 5	Total	Report
17 Dec	20:00	Greenyard Maaseik (Belgium)	3–2	(Spain) CV Guaguas Las Palmas	23–25	25–20	25–23	19–25	15–10	107–103	Report

== Final phase ==
=== Semifinals ===
Team 1	Agg.	Team 2	1st leg	2nd leg	Golden Set
Dynamo Moscow (Russia)	6–0	(France) Montpellier Castelnau UC	3–1	3–0	
Zenit Saint Petersburg (Russia)	3–3	(Belgium) Greenyard Maaseik	3–1	0–3	18–16

==== First leg ====
Date	Time		Score		Set 1	Set 2	Set 3	Set 4	Set 5	Total	Report
24 Feb	19:00	Dynamo Moscow (Russia)	3–1	(France) Montpellier Castelnau UC	25–21	25–16	13–25	25–21		88–83	Report
24 Feb	19:30	Zenit Saint Petersburg (Russia)	3–1	(Belgium) Greenyard Maaseik	25–20	23–25	26–24	26–24		100–93	Report

==== Second leg ====
Date	Time		Score		Set 1	Set 2	Set 3	Set 4	Set 5	Total	Report
4 Mar	19:00	Montpellier Castelnau UC (France)	0–3	(Russia) Dynamo Moscow	23–25	22–25	10–25			55–75	Report
3 Mar	20:30	Greenyard Maaseik (Belgium)	3–0	(Russia) Zenit Saint Petersburg	25–23	25–17	25–19			75–59	Report
Golden set		Greenyard Maaseik (Belgium)	16–18	(Russia) Zenit Saint Petersburg							

=== Finals ===
Team 1	Agg.	Team 2	1st leg	2nd leg
Dynamo Moscow (Russia)	5–1	(Russia) Zenit Saint Petersburg	3–2	3–1

==== First leg ====
Date	Time		Score		Set 1	Set 2	Set 3	Set 4	Set 5	Total	Report
17 Mar	19:00	Dynamo Moscow (Russia)	3–2	(Russia) Zenit Saint Petersburg	26–28	25–18	20–25	26–24	15–9	112–104	Report

==== Second leg ====
Date	Time		Score		Set 1	Set 2	Set 3	Set 4	Set 5	Total	Report
25 Mar	19:30	Zenit Saint Petersburg (Russia)	1–3	(Russia) Dynamo Moscow	21–25	25–23	26–28	24–26		96–102	Report

== Final standings ==
Rank	Team
1st place, gold medalist(s)	(Russia) Dynamo Moscow
2nd place, silver medalist(s)	(Russia) Zenit Saint Petersburg
Semifinalists	(Belgium) Greenyard Maaseik (France) Montpellier Castelnau UC

2020–21 CEV Cup winner
(Russia)
Dynamo Moscow
4th title
