= 2009 FIVB Volleyball Men's World Grand Champions Cup squads =

This article shows all participating team squads at the 2009 FIVB Volleyball Men's World Grand Champions Cup.

== Brazil ==
The following is the Brazil roster in the 2009 FIVB Volleyball Men's World Grand Champions Cup.

#	Name	Date of Birth	Height	Weight	Spike	Block	Club
1	Bruno Rezende	2 July 1986	190 cm (6 ft 3 in)	76 kg (168 lb)	323 cm (10 ft 7 in)	302 cm (9 ft 11 in)	Pallavolo Modena
2	Sandro Carvalho	2 April 1981	189 cm (6 ft 2 in)	83 kg (183 lb)	317 cm (10 ft 5 in)	306 cm (10 ft 0 in)	SESI
3	Eder Carbonera	19 October 1983	204 cm (6 ft 8 in)	101 kg (223 lb)	350 cm (11 ft 6 in)	330 cm (10 ft 10 in)	Sada Cruzeiro Volei
4	Leandro Silva	17 December 1983	205 cm (6 ft 9 in)	94 kg (207 lb)	354 cm (11 ft 7 in)	330 cm (10 ft 10 in)	Sada Cruzeiro
5	Sidnei Santos	9 July 1982	203 cm (6 ft 8 in)	98 kg (216 lb)	344 cm (11 ft 3 in)	318 cm (10 ft 5 in)	Taubaté Funvic
6	Leandro Vissotto Neves	30 April 1983	212 cm (6 ft 11 in)	108 kg (238 lb)	370 cm (12 ft 2 in)	345 cm (11 ft 4 in)	JT Thunders
7	Gilberto Godoy Filho	23 December 1976	192 cm (6 ft 4 in)	85 kg (187 lb)	325 cm (10 ft 8 in)	312 cm (10 ft 3 in)	Cimed/Sky
8	Murilo Endres	3 May 1981	190 cm (6 ft 3 in)	76 kg (168 lb)	343 cm (11 ft 3 in)	319 cm (10 ft 6 in)	SESI
9	Theo Lopes	31 August 1983	199 cm (6 ft 6 in)	79 kg (174 lb)	335 cm (11 ft 0 in)	320 cm (10 ft 6 in)	SANTORY SUNBIRDS
10	Sérgio Dutra Santos	15 October 1975	184 cm (6 ft 0 in)	78 kg (172 lb)	325 cm (10 ft 8 in)	310 cm (10 ft 2 in)	SESI
11	Thiago Soares Alves	26 July 1986	194 cm (6 ft 4 in)	88 kg (194 lb)	330 cm (10 ft 10 in)	308 cm (10 ft 1 in)	RJX
12	Joao Paulo Tavares	30 March 1983	205 cm (6 ft 9 in)	95 kg (209 lb)	332 cm (10 ft 11 in)	327 cm (10 ft 9 in)	CIMED SKY
13	Tiago Barth	13 June 1988	209 cm (6 ft 10 in)	87 kg (192 lb)	360 cm (11 ft 10 in)	330 cm (10 ft 10 in)	SESI
14	Rodrigo Santana	17 April 1979	205 cm (6 ft 9 in)	85 kg (187 lb)	350 cm (11 ft 6 in)	328 cm (10 ft 9 in)	Al-Rayyan
15	Maurício Silva	4 February 1989	197 cm (6 ft 6 in)	85 kg (187 lb)	321 cm (10 ft 6 in)	302 cm (9 ft 11 in)	Minas Tênis Clube
16	Lucas Saatkamp	6 March 1986	209 cm (6 ft 10 in)	101 kg (223 lb)	340 cm (11 ft 2 in)	321 cm (10 ft 6 in)	SESI
17	Marlon Yared	27 July 1977	190 cm (6 ft 3 in)	80 kg (180 lb)	315 cm (10 ft 4 in)	304 cm (10 ft 0 in)	VIVO/MINAS
18	João Paulo Bravo	7 January 1979	190 cm (6 ft 3 in)	87 kg (192 lb)	340 cm (11 ft 2 in)	320 cm (10 ft 6 in)	Arkas Spor Kulubu
19	Mário Pedreira Júnior	3 May 1982	192 cm (6 ft 4 in)	91 kg (201 lb)	330 cm (10 ft 10 in)	321 cm (10 ft 6 in)	Volley Piacenza
20	Wanderson Campos	7 February 1988	198 cm (6 ft 6 in)	95 kg (209 lb)	344 cm (11 ft 3 in)	320 cm (10 ft 6 in)	Vivo Minas

== Cuba ==
The following is the Cuba roster in the 2009 FIVB Volleyball Men's World Grand Champions Cup.

#	Name	Date of Birth	Height	Weight	Spike	Block	Club
1	Wilfredo Leon Venero	31 July 1993	202 cm (6 ft 8 in)	96 kg (212 lb)	350 cm (11 ft 6 in)	346 cm (11 ft 4 in)	Santiago de Cuba
2	Lian Sem Estrada Jova	12 December 1982	196 cm (6 ft 5 in)	83 kg (183 lb)	339 cm (11 ft 1 in)	335 cm (11 ft 0 in)	Santiago de Cuba
3	Gustavo Leyva Alvarez	14 December 1985	180 cm (5 ft 11 in)	75 kg (165 lb)	305 cm (10 ft 0 in)	300 cm (9 ft 10 in)	Ciudad Habana
4	Yoandy Leal Hidalgo	31 August 1988	201 cm (6 ft 7 in)	84 kg (185 lb)	361 cm (11 ft 10 in)	348 cm (11 ft 5 in)	Sada Cruzeiro Volei
5	Leandro Macias Infante	13 February 1990	192 cm (6 ft 4 in)	70 kg (150 lb)	325 cm (10 ft 8 in)	318 cm (10 ft 5 in)	Santiago de Cuba
6	Keibel Gutierrez Torna	6 May 1987	178 cm (5 ft 10 in)	80 kg (180 lb)	305 cm (10 ft 0 in)	295 cm (9 ft 8 in)	Villa Clara
7	Osmany Roberto Camejo Durruthy	18 February 1983	202 cm (6 ft 8 in)	90 kg (200 lb)	350 cm (11 ft 6 in)	330 cm (10 ft 10 in)	Ciudad Habana
8	Rolando Cepeda Abreu	13 March 1989	198 cm (6 ft 6 in)	77 kg (170 lb)	359 cm (11 ft 9 in)	344 cm (11 ft 3 in)	S.Spiritus
9	Michael Sánchez Bozhulev	5 June 1986	206 cm (6 ft 9 in)	100 kg (220 lb)	365 cm (12 ft 0 in)	340 cm (11 ft 2 in)	Al-Rayyan Sports Club
10	Osmel Camejo Durruthy	25 September 1989	202 cm (6 ft 8 in)	82 kg (181 lb)	267 cm (8 ft 9 in)	351 cm (11 ft 6 in)	C.Habana
11	Gonzalez Raidel Delgado	8 September 1987	195 cm (6 ft 5 in)	81 kg (179 lb)	347 cm (11 ft 5 in)	330 cm (10 ft 10 in)	La Habana
12	Yenry Bell Cisnero	27 July 1981	188 cm (6 ft 2 in)	84 kg (185 lb)	358 cm (11 ft 9 in)	328 cm (10 ft 9 in)	Santiago de Cuba
13	Robertlandy Simón Aties	11 June 1987	206 cm (6 ft 9 in)	91 kg (201 lb)	358 cm (11 ft 9 in)	326 cm (10 ft 8 in)	Al-Rayyan Sports Club
14	Raydel Hierrezuelo Aguirre	14 July 1987	196 cm (6 ft 5 in)	87 kg (192 lb)	340 cm (11 ft 2 in)	335 cm (11 ft 0 in)	Ciudad Habana
15	Darien Ferrer Delis	31 October 1983	204 cm (6 ft 8 in)	84 kg (185 lb)	362 cm (11 ft 11 in)	346 cm (11 ft 4 in)	Santiago de Cuba
16	Isbel Mesa Sandobal	2 June 1989	204 cm (6 ft 8 in)	89 kg (196 lb)	358 cm (11 ft 9 in)	331 cm (10 ft 10 in)	C. Habana
17	Odelvis Dominico Speck	6 May 1977	205 cm (6 ft 9 in)	87 kg (192 lb)	360 cm (11 ft 10 in)	356 cm (11 ft 8 in)	Ciudad Habana
18	Yosmany Díaz Carmenate	8 January 1988	196 cm (6 ft 5 in)	89 kg (196 lb)	358 cm (11 ft 9 in)	328 cm (10 ft 9 in)	Ciudad Habana
19	Fernando Hernandez Ramos	11 September 1989	196 cm (6 ft 5 in)	78 kg (172 lb)	358 cm (11 ft 9 in)	339 cm (11 ft 1 in)	C.Habana

== Egypt ==
The following is the Egypt roster in the 2009 FIVB Volleyball Men's World Grand Champions Cup.

#	Name	Date of Birth	Height	Weight	Spike	Block	Club
1	Hamdy Awad	14 April 1972	202 cm (6 ft 8 in)	105 kg (231 lb)	346 cm (11 ft 4 in)	327 cm (10 ft 9 in)	AHLY
2	Abdalla Ahmed	10 October 1983	199 cm (6 ft 6 in)	78 kg (172 lb)	333 cm (10 ft 11 in)	321 cm (10 ft 6 in)	AHLY
3	Mohamed Gabal	21 January 1984	195 cm (6 ft 5 in)	97 kg (214 lb)	345 cm (11 ft 4 in)	320 cm (10 ft 6 in)	El Gaish
4	Ahmed Abdelhay	19 August 1984	197 cm (6 ft 6 in)	87 kg (192 lb)	342 cm (11 ft 3 in)	316 cm (10 ft 4 in)	AHLY
5	Abdel Latif Ahmed	13 August 1983	201 cm (6 ft 7 in)	90 kg (200 lb)	335 cm (11 ft 0 in)	325 cm (10 ft 8 in)	Ahly
6	Wael Alaydy	8 December 1971	178 cm (5 ft 10 in)	78 kg (172 lb)	320 cm (10 ft 6 in)	300 cm (9 ft 10 in)	AHLY
7	Ashraf Abouelhassan	17 May 1975	186 cm (6 ft 1 in)	86 kg (190 lb)	325 cm (10 ft 8 in)	318 cm (10 ft 5 in)	ZAMALEK
8	Saleh Youssef	25 July 1982	194 cm (6 ft 4 in)	91 kg (201 lb)	345 cm (11 ft 4 in)	332 cm (10 ft 11 in)	Zamalek
9	Rashad Atia	2 September 1986	201 cm (6 ft 7 in)	91 kg (201 lb)	348 cm (11 ft 5 in)	342 cm (11 ft 3 in)	ARMY CLUB
10	Mahmoud Elkoumy	19 October 1983	196 cm (6 ft 5 in)	80 kg (180 lb)	330 cm (10 ft 10 in)	326 cm (10 ft 8 in)	AHLY
11	Ahmed Afifi	30 March 1988	194 cm (6 ft 4 in)	92 kg (203 lb)	347 cm (11 ft 5 in)	342 cm (11 ft 3 in)	ZAMALEK
12	Hosaam Abdalla	16 February 1988	202 cm (6 ft 8 in)	90 kg (200 lb)	326 cm (10 ft 8 in)	0 cm (0 in)	Ahly
13	Mohamed Badawy	11 January 1986	197 cm (6 ft 6 in)	97 kg (214 lb)	351 cm (11 ft 6 in)	343 cm (11 ft 3 in)	ZAMALEK
14	Ahmed Elshikh	19 July 1988	202 cm (6 ft 8 in)	86 kg (190 lb)	340 cm (11 ft 2 in)	0 cm (0 in)	ZAMALEK
15	Ahmed Abdel Fattah	14 June 1986	198 cm (6 ft 6 in)	95 kg (209 lb)	335 cm (11 ft 0 in)	325 cm (10 ft 8 in)	POLICE UNION
16	Mohamed Seif Elnasr	5 September 1983	202 cm (6 ft 8 in)	89 kg (196 lb)	345 cm (11 ft 4 in)	339 cm (11 ft 1 in)	ZAMALEK
17	Mohamed Thakil	12 July 1986	184 cm (6 ft 0 in)	71 kg (157 lb)	326 cm (10 ft 8 in)	315 cm (10 ft 4 in)	AHLY
18	Mohamed El Daabousi	1 March 1987	202 cm (6 ft 8 in)	107 kg (236 lb)	348 cm (11 ft 5 in)	342 cm (11 ft 3 in)	ZAMALEK
19	Mohamed Moawad	26 August 1987	194 cm (6 ft 4 in)	90 kg (200 lb)	321 cm (10 ft 6 in)	310 cm (10 ft 2 in)	AHLY
20	Mohamed Issa	12 April 1988	200 cm (6 ft 7 in)	80 kg (180 lb)	335 cm (11 ft 0 in)	0 cm (0 in)	AHLY

== Iran ==
The following is the Iran roster in the 2009 FIVB Volleyball Men's World Grand Champions Cup.

#	Name	Date of Birth	Height	Weight	Spike	Block	Club
1	Adel Gholami	9 February 1986	195 cm (6 ft 5 in)	88 kg (194 lb)	341 cm (11 ft 2 in)	330 cm (10 ft 10 in)	Mizan Mashhad
2	Javad Mohammadnejadi R.	22 March 1985	202 cm (6 ft 8 in)	83 kg (183 lb)	343 cm (11 ft 3 in)	327 cm (10 ft 9 in)	FOULAD UROMIA
3	Mohammad Reza Hosseini Pouya	23 August 1994	194 cm (6 ft 4 in)	83 kg (183 lb)	320 cm (10 ft 6 in)	313 cm (10 ft 3 in)	Saipa
4	Mir Saeid Marouflakrani	20 October 1985	189 cm (6 ft 2 in)	81 kg (179 lb)	331 cm (10 ft 10 in)	311 cm (10 ft 2 in)	Zenit Kazan
5	Mansour Zadvan	6 January 1987	202 cm (6 ft 8 in)	90 kg (200 lb)	350 cm (11 ft 6 in)	327 cm (10 ft 9 in)	AZAD UNIVERSITY
6	Seyed Mohammad Mousavi Eraghi	22 August 1987	203 cm (6 ft 8 in)	86 kg (190 lb)	362 cm (11 ft 11 in)	344 cm (11 ft 3 in)	Paykan
7	Hamzeh Zarini	18 October 1985	198 cm (6 ft 6 in)	98 kg (216 lb)	351 cm (11 ft 6 in)	330 cm (10 ft 10 in)	Matin Varamin
8	Ahsanollah Shirkavand	18 March 1981	180 cm (5 ft 11 in)	75 kg (165 lb)	300 cm (9 ft 10 in)	296 cm (9 ft 9 in)	Matin Varna
9	Alireza Nadi	2 September 1980	200 cm (6 ft 7 in)	90 kg (200 lb)	334 cm (10 ft 11 in)	320 cm (10 ft 6 in)	Kaleh
10	Mohssen Andalib	17 July 1983	191 cm (6 ft 3 in)	83 kg (183 lb)	336 cm (11 ft 0 in)	307 cm (10 ft 1 in)	Paykan
11	Arash Sadeghiany	15 February 1985	191 cm (6 ft 3 in)	90 kg (200 lb)	347 cm (11 ft 5 in)	327 cm (10 ft 9 in)	PETROSHIMI
12	Farhad Nazari Afshar	22 May 1984	195 cm (6 ft 5 in)	85 kg (187 lb)	345 cm (11 ft 4 in)	331 cm (10 ft 10 in)	Matin Varna
13	Mehdi Mahdavi	13 February 1984	190 cm (6 ft 3 in)	82 kg (181 lb)	330 cm (10 ft 10 in)	315 cm (10 ft 4 in)	Paykan
14	Arash Keshavarzi	16 February 1987	198 cm (6 ft 6 in)	91 kg (201 lb)	320 cm (10 ft 6 in)	305 cm (10 ft 0 in)	AZAD UNIVERSITY
15	Arash Kamalvand	11 May 1989	201 cm (6 ft 7 in)	91 kg (201 lb)	345 cm (11 ft 4 in)	325 cm (10 ft 8 in)	SAIPA
16	Abdolreza Alizadeh Gh.	19 February 1987	183 cm (6 ft 0 in)	80 kg (180 lb)	272 cm (8 ft 11 in)	252 cm (8 ft 3 in)	Shahrdari Urmia
17	Rahman Davoodi	18 February 1988	195 cm (6 ft 5 in)	95 kg (209 lb)	348 cm (11 ft 5 in)	328 cm (10 ft 9 in)	Mizan
18	Mohammad Mohammad Kazem	28 September 1985	200 cm (6 ft 7 in)	92 kg (203 lb)	350 cm (11 ft 6 in)	323 cm (10 ft 7 in)	Matin Varna
19	Farhad Ghaemi	28 August 1989	197 cm (6 ft 6 in)	73 kg (161 lb)	355 cm (11 ft 8 in)	335 cm (11 ft 0 in)	Paykan
20	Farhad Salafzoon	6 December 1992	200 cm (6 ft 7 in)	81 kg (179 lb)	320 cm (10 ft 6 in)	313 cm (10 ft 3 in)	Matin Varna

== Japan ==
The following is the Japan roster in the 2009 FIVB Volleyball Men's World Grand Champions Cup.

#	Name	Date of Birth	Height	Weight	Spike	Block	Club
1	Osamu Tanabe	10 April 1979	181 cm (5 ft 11 in)	73 kg (161 lb)	330 cm (10 ft 10 in)	300 cm (9 ft 10 in)	Toray Arrows
2	Yuta Abe	8 August 1981	191 cm (6 ft 3 in)	85 kg (187 lb)	342 cm (11 ft 3 in)	320 cm (10 ft 6 in)	Suntory Sunbirds
3	Takeshi Nagano	11 July 1985	176 cm (5 ft 9 in)	69 kg (152 lb)	315 cm (10 ft 4 in)	300 cm (9 ft 10 in)	Panasonic Panthers
4	Yusuke Matsuta	31 October 1982	200 cm (6 ft 7 in)	90 kg (200 lb)	345 cm (11 ft 4 in)	340 cm (11 ft 2 in)	Panasonic Panthers
5	Daisuke Usami	29 March 1979	184 cm (6 ft 0 in)	88 kg (194 lb)	320 cm (10 ft 6 in)	310 cm (10 ft 2 in)	Panasonic Panthers
6	Naoya Suga	17 May 1985	178 cm (5 ft 10 in)	85 kg (187 lb)	325 cm (10 ft 8 in)	315 cm (10 ft 4 in)	JT Thunders
7	Yusuke Inoue	5 August 1983	173 cm (5 ft 8 in)	72 kg (159 lb)	315 cm (10 ft 4 in)	300 cm (9 ft 10 in)	Sakai Blazers
8	Kazuki Maeda	17 August 1983	186 cm (6 ft 1 in)	74 kg (163 lb)	336 cm (11 ft 0 in)	323 cm (10 ft 7 in)	FC Tokyo
9	Hisashi Aizawa	8 March 1986	195 cm (6 ft 5 in)	86 kg (190 lb)	353 cm (11 ft 7 in)	335 cm (11 ft 0 in)	Toray Arrows
10	Daisuke Yako	7 October 1988	194 cm (6 ft 4 in)	89 kg (196 lb)	335 cm (11 ft 0 in)	325 cm (10 ft 8 in)	JT Thunders
11	Yoshihiko Matsumoto	7 January 1981	193 cm (6 ft 4 in)	80 kg (180 lb)	340 cm (11 ft 2 in)	330 cm (10 ft 10 in)	Sakai Blazers
12	Kota Yamamura	20 October 1980	205 cm (6 ft 9 in)	95 kg (209 lb)	350 cm (11 ft 6 in)	335 cm (11 ft 0 in)	Suntory Sunbirds
13	Kunihiro Shimizu	11 August 1986	192 cm (6 ft 4 in)	97 kg (214 lb)	345 cm (11 ft 4 in)	335 cm (11 ft 0 in)	Panasonic Panthers
14	Tatsuya Fukuzawa	1 July 1986	189 cm (6 ft 2 in)	86 kg (190 lb)	355 cm (11 ft 8 in)	345 cm (11 ft 4 in)	Panasonic Panthers
15	Takaaki Tomimatsu	20 July 1984	192 cm (6 ft 4 in)	85 kg (187 lb)	350 cm (11 ft 6 in)	330 cm (10 ft 10 in)	Toray Arrows
16	Yusuke Ishijima	9 January 1984	197 cm (6 ft 6 in)	102 kg (225 lb)	345 cm (11 ft 4 in)	335 cm (11 ft 0 in)	Sakai Blazers
17	Yu Koshikawa	30 June 1984	189 cm (6 ft 2 in)	87 kg (192 lb)	340 cm (11 ft 2 in)	320 cm (10 ft 6 in)	JT Thunders
18	Yuta Yoneyama	29 August 1984	185 cm (6 ft 1 in)	85 kg (187 lb)	340 cm (11 ft 2 in)	320 cm (10 ft 6 in)	Toray Arrows
19	Shiro Furuta	29 January 1988	188 cm (6 ft 2 in)	88 kg (194 lb)	350 cm (11 ft 6 in)	330 cm (10 ft 10 in)	Hosei University
20	Takuya Yasunaga	27 March 1990	192 cm (6 ft 4 in)	88 kg (194 lb)	353 cm (11 ft 7 in)	322 cm (10 ft 7 in)	Tokai University

== Poland ==
The following is the Poland roster in the 2009 FIVB Volleyball Men's World Grand Champions Cup.

#	Name	Date of Birth	Height	Weight	Spike	Block	Club
1	Piotr Nowakowski	18 December 1987	205 cm (6 ft 9 in)	90 kg (200 lb)	355 cm (11 ft 8 in)	340 cm (11 ft 2 in)	Asseco Resovia
2	Grzegorz Lomacz	1 October 1987	187 cm (6 ft 2 in)	80 kg (180 lb)	335 cm (11 ft 0 in)	315 cm (10 ft 4 in)	Cuprum
3	Piotr Gruszka	8 March 1977	206 cm (6 ft 9 in)	102 kg (225 lb)	355 cm (11 ft 8 in)	330 cm (10 ft 10 in)	GS RoburAngelo Costa
4	Daniel Plinski	10 December 1978	204 cm (6 ft 8 in)	100 kg (220 lb)	345 cm (11 ft 4 in)	325 cm (10 ft 8 in)	PGE Skra
5	Pawel Zagumny	18 October 1977	200 cm (6 ft 7 in)	88 kg (194 lb)	336 cm (11 ft 0 in)	317 cm (10 ft 5 in)	ZAKSA
6	Bartosz Kurek	29 August 1988	205 cm (6 ft 9 in)	87 kg (192 lb)	352 cm (11 ft 7 in)	326 cm (10 ft 8 in)	Lube Banca Marche
7	Jakub Jarosz	10 February 1987	195 cm (6 ft 5 in)	84 kg (185 lb)	353 cm (11 ft 7 in)	328 cm (10 ft 9 in)	Transfer
8	Marcin Wika	9 November 1983	194 cm (6 ft 4 in)	86 kg (190 lb)	335 cm (11 ft 0 in)	310 cm (10 ft 2 in)	Asseco Resovia
9	Zbigniew Bartman	4 May 1987	198 cm (6 ft 6 in)	95 kg (209 lb)	352 cm (11 ft 7 in)	320 cm (10 ft 6 in)	Asseco Resovia
10	Marcel Gromadowski	19 December 1985	200 cm (6 ft 7 in)	94 kg (207 lb)	348 cm (11 ft 5 in)	318 cm (10 ft 5 in)	Paris Volley
11	Fabian Drzyzga	3 January 1990	196 cm (6 ft 5 in)	90 kg (200 lb)	325 cm (10 ft 8 in)	304 cm (10 ft 0 in)	Asseco Resovia
12	Pawel Woicki	29 June 1983	183 cm (6 ft 0 in)	80 kg (180 lb)	330 cm (10 ft 10 in)	305 cm (10 ft 0 in)	Transfer Bydgoszcz
13	Karol Klos	8 August 1989	201 cm (6 ft 7 in)	87 kg (192 lb)	357 cm (11 ft 9 in)	326 cm (10 ft 8 in)	PGE Skra
14	Michal Ruciak	22 August 1983	189 cm (6 ft 2 in)	75 kg (165 lb)	336 cm (11 ft 0 in)	305 cm (10 ft 0 in)	ZAKSA
15	Piotr Gacek	16 September 1978	185 cm (6 ft 1 in)	78 kg (172 lb)	325 cm (10 ft 8 in)	305 cm (10 ft 0 in)	LOTOS Trefl
16	Krzysztof Ignaczak	15 May 1978	188 cm (6 ft 2 in)	86 kg (190 lb)	330 cm (10 ft 10 in)	315 cm (10 ft 4 in)	Asseco Resovia
17	Michal Bakiewicz	22 March 1981	197 cm (6 ft 6 in)	92 kg (203 lb)	339 cm (11 ft 1 in)	318 cm (10 ft 5 in)	PGE Skra
18	Marcin Mozdzonek	9 February 1985	211 cm (6 ft 11 in)	93 kg (205 lb)	358 cm (11 ft 9 in)	338 cm (11 ft 1 in)	Halkbank
19	Pawel Zatorski	21 June 1990	184 cm (6 ft 0 in)	73 kg (161 lb)	328 cm (10 ft 9 in)	304 cm (10 ft 0 in)	ZAKSA
20	Rafal Buszek	28 April 1987	194 cm (6 ft 4 in)	81 kg (179 lb)	345 cm (11 ft 4 in)	327 cm (10 ft 9 in)	ZAKSA
