= 2013 FIVB Volleyball Men's World Grand Champions Cup squads =

This article shows all participating team squads at the 2013 FIVB Volleyball Men's World Grand Champions Cup.

== Brazil ==
The following is the Brazil roster in the 2013 FIVB Volleyball Men's World Grand Champions Cup.

#	Name	Date of Birth	Height	Weight	Spike	Block	Club
1	Bruno Rezende	2 July 1986	190 cm (6 ft 3 in)	76 kg (168 lb)	323 cm (10 ft 7 in)	302 cm (9 ft 11 in)	Pallavolo Modena
4	Wallace de Souza	26 June 1987	198 cm (6 ft 6 in)	87 kg (192 lb)	344 cm (11 ft 3 in)	318 cm (10 ft 5 in)	Sada Cruzeiro Volei
5	Sidnei Santos	9 July 1982	203 cm (6 ft 8 in)	98 kg (216 lb)	344 cm (11 ft 3 in)	318 cm (10 ft 5 in)	Taubaté Funvic
8	Ricardo Lucarelli	14 February 1992	195 cm (6 ft 5 in)	79 kg (174 lb)	338 cm (11 ft 1 in)	308 cm (10 ft 1 in)	SESI
9	Evandro Guerra	27 December 1981	207 cm (6 ft 9 in)	103 kg (227 lb)	359 cm (11 ft 9 in)	332 cm (10 ft 11 in)	Suntory Sunbirds
11	Thiago Soares Alves	26 July 1986	194 cm (6 ft 4 in)	88 kg (194 lb)	330 cm (10 ft 10 in)	308 cm (10 ft 1 in)	RJX
12	Luiz Felipe Fonteles	19 June 1984	196 cm (6 ft 5 in)	89 kg (196 lb)	330 cm (10 ft 10 in)	320 cm (10 ft 6 in)	Taubaté Funvic
13	Maurício Souza	29 September 1988	209 cm (6 ft 10 in)	93 kg (205 lb)	344 cm (11 ft 3 in)	323 cm (10 ft 7 in)	Taubaté Funvic
16	Lucas Saatkamp	6 March 1986	209 cm (6 ft 10 in)	101 kg (223 lb)	340 cm (11 ft 2 in)	321 cm (10 ft 6 in)	SESI
18	Maurício Borges Silva	4 February 1989	199 cm (6 ft 6 in)	99 kg (218 lb)	335 cm (11 ft 0 in)	315 cm (10 ft 4 in)	SESI
19	Mário Pedreira	3 May 1982	192 cm (6 ft 4 in)	91 kg (201 lb)	330 cm (10 ft 10 in)	321 cm (10 ft 6 in)	Volley Piacenza
20	Raphael Oliveira	14 June 1979	190 cm (6 ft 3 in)	82 kg (181 lb)	330 cm (10 ft 10 in)	306 cm (10 ft 0 in)	Taubaté Funvic

== Iran ==
The following is the Iran roster in the 2013 FIVB Volleyball Men's World Grand Champions Cup.

#	Name	Date of Birth	Height	Weight	Spike	Block	Club
1	Shahram Mahmoudi	20 July 1988	198 cm (6 ft 6 in)	95 kg (209 lb)	347 cm (11 ft 5 in)	332 cm (10 ft 11 in)	Shahrdari Urmia
4	Mir Saeid Marouflakrani	20 October 1985	189 cm (6 ft 2 in)	81 kg (179 lb)	331 cm (10 ft 10 in)	311 cm (10 ft 2 in)	Zenit Kazan
5	Farhad Ghaemi	28 August 1989	197 cm (6 ft 6 in)	73 kg (161 lb)	355 cm (11 ft 8 in)	335 cm (11 ft 0 in)	Paykan
6	Seyed Mohammad Mousavi Eraghi	22 August 1987	203 cm (6 ft 8 in)	86 kg (190 lb)	362 cm (11 ft 11 in)	344 cm (11 ft 3 in)	Paykan
7	Hamzeh Zarini	18 October 1985	198 cm (6 ft 6 in)	98 kg (216 lb)	351 cm (11 ft 6 in)	330 cm (10 ft 10 in)	Matin Varamin
8	Farhad Zarif Ahangaran	3 March 1983	165 cm (5 ft 5 in)	60 kg (130 lb)	290 cm (9 ft 6 in)	271 cm (8 ft 11 in)	Mizan Mashhad
9	Adel Gholami	9 February 1986	195 cm (6 ft 5 in)	88 kg (194 lb)	341 cm (11 ft 2 in)	330 cm (10 ft 10 in)	Mizan Mashhad
10	Amir Ghafour	6 June 1991	202 cm (6 ft 8 in)	90 kg (200 lb)	354 cm (11 ft 7 in)	334 cm (10 ft 11 in)	Matin Varamin
11	Rahman Davoodi	18 February 1988	195 cm (6 ft 5 in)	95 kg (209 lb)	348 cm (11 ft 5 in)	328 cm (10 ft 9 in)	Mizan
12	Mojtaba Mirzajanpour	7 October 1991	205 cm (6 ft 9 in)	88 kg (194 lb)	355 cm (11 ft 8 in)	348 cm (11 ft 5 in)	Paykan
13	Mehdi Mahdavi	13 February 1984	191 cm (6 ft 3 in)	96 kg (212 lb)	330 cm (10 ft 10 in)	310 cm (10 ft 2 in)	Mizan Mashhad
15	Naser Rahimipanah	27 June 1991	191 cm (6 ft 3 in)	73 kg (161 lb)	326 cm (10 ft 8 in)	310 cm (10 ft 2 in)	KALLEH
16	Armin Tashakori	8 December 1986	200 cm (6 ft 7 in)	94 kg (207 lb)	355 cm (11 ft 8 in)	335 cm (11 ft 0 in)	Mizan Mashhad
20	Alireza Mobasheri	10 June 1988	190 cm (6 ft 3 in)	90 kg (200 lb)	345 cm (11 ft 4 in)	320 cm (10 ft 6 in)	Mizan

== Italy ==
The following is the Italy roster in the 2013 FIVB Volleyball Men's World Grand Champions Cup.

#	Name	Date of Birth	Height	Weight	Spike	Block	Club
1	Thomas Beretta	18 April 1990	205 cm (6 ft 9 in)	105 kg (231 lb)	359 cm (11 ft 9 in)	330 cm (10 ft 10 in)	Modena Volley Punto Zero
2	Jiri Kovar	10 April 1989	202 cm (6 ft 8 in)	95 kg (209 lb)	353 cm (11 ft 7 in)	330 cm (10 ft 10 in)	Volley Lube
4	Luca Vettori	26 April 1991	200 cm (6 ft 7 in)	95 kg (209 lb)	345 cm (11 ft 4 in)	323 cm (10 ft 7 in)	Modena Volley Punto Zero
6	Ludovico Dolfo	30 June 1989	195 cm (6 ft 5 in)	87 kg (192 lb)	347 cm (11 ft 5 in)	330 cm (10 ft 10 in)	Altotevere
7	Salvatore Rossini	13 July 1986	185 cm (6 ft 1 in)	82 kg (181 lb)	312 cm (10 ft 3 in)	301 cm (9 ft 11 in)	Modena Volley Punto Zero
9	Ivan Zaytsev	2 October 1988	202 cm (6 ft 8 in)	92 kg (203 lb)	355 cm (11 ft 8 in)	348 cm (11 ft 5 in)	Dinamo Moscow
10	Filippo Lanza	3 March 1991	198 cm (6 ft 6 in)	98 kg (216 lb)	350 cm (11 ft 6 in)	330 cm (10 ft 10 in)	Trentino Volley
13	Dragan Travica	28 August 1986	200 cm (6 ft 7 in)	94 kg (207 lb)	335 cm (11 ft 0 in)	320 cm (10 ft 6 in)	Belogorie Belgorod
14	Matteo Piano	24 October 1990	208 cm (6 ft 10 in)	102 kg (225 lb)	352 cm (11 ft 7 in)	325 cm (10 ft 8 in)	Modena Volley Punto Zero
15	Emanuele Birarelli	8 February 1981	202 cm (6 ft 8 in)	95 kg (209 lb)	340 cm (11 ft 2 in)	316 cm (10 ft 4 in)	Sir Safety Umbria Volley
16	Michele Baranowicz	5 August 1989	196 cm (6 ft 5 in)	93 kg (205 lb)	350 cm (11 ft 6 in)	328 cm (10 ft 9 in)	Volley Lube
18	Giulio Sabbi	10 August 1989	201 cm (6 ft 7 in)	92 kg (203 lb)	352 cm (11 ft 7 in)	325 cm (10 ft 8 in)	Volley Lube

== Japan ==
The following is the Japan roster in the 2013 FIVB Volleyball Men's World Grand Champions Cup.

#	Name	Date of Birth	Height	Weight	Spike	Block	Club
3	Takeshi Nagano	11 July 1985	176 cm (5 ft 9 in)	69 kg (152 lb)	315 cm (10 ft 4 in)	300 cm (9 ft 10 in)	Panasonic Panthers
4	Shigeru Kondoh	23 November 1982	186 cm (6 ft 1 in)	85 kg (187 lb)	330 cm (10 ft 10 in)	315 cm (10 ft 4 in)	Toray Arrows
5	Shun Imamura	20 July 1987	181 cm (5 ft 11 in)	70 kg (150 lb)	330 cm (10 ft 10 in)	315 cm (10 ft 4 in)	Sakai Blazers
7	Kunihiro Shimizu	11 August 1986	192 cm (6 ft 4 in)	97 kg (214 lb)	345 cm (11 ft 4 in)	335 cm (11 ft 0 in)	Panasonic Panthers
8	Kazuyoshi Yokota	1 May 1986	194 cm (6 ft 4 in)	85 kg (187 lb)	345 cm (11 ft 4 in)	325 cm (10 ft 8 in)	Sakai Blazers
9	Shogo Toimoto	25 June 1987	197 cm (6 ft 6 in)	94 kg (207 lb)	347 cm (11 ft 5 in)	330 cm (10 ft 10 in)	JT Thunders
11	Yoshihiko Matsumoto	7 January 1981	193 cm (6 ft 4 in)	80 kg (180 lb)	340 cm (11 ft 2 in)	330 cm (10 ft 10 in)	Sakai Blazers
12	Kota Yamamura	20 October 1980	205 cm (6 ft 9 in)	95 kg (209 lb)	350 cm (11 ft 6 in)	335 cm (11 ft 0 in)	Suntory Sunbirds
13	Ken Takahashi	22 December 1988	180 cm (5 ft 11 in)	73 kg (161 lb)	310 cm (10 ft 2 in)	300 cm (9 ft 10 in)	Suntory Sunbirds
14	Tatsuya Fukuzawa	1 July 1986	189 cm (6 ft 2 in)	86 kg (190 lb)	355 cm (11 ft 8 in)	345 cm (11 ft 4 in)	Panasonic Panthers
16	Yusuke Ishijima	9 January 1984	197 cm (6 ft 6 in)	102 kg (225 lb)	345 cm (11 ft 4 in)	335 cm (11 ft 0 in)	Sakai Blazers
17	Yu Koshikawa	30 June 1984	189 cm (6 ft 2 in)	87 kg (192 lb)	340 cm (11 ft 2 in)	320 cm (10 ft 6 in)	JT Thunders
18	Yuta Yoneyama	29 August 1984	185 cm (6 ft 1 in)	85 kg (187 lb)	340 cm (11 ft 2 in)	320 cm (10 ft 6 in)	Toray Arrows
19	Shunsuke Chijiki	6 September 1989	193 cm (6 ft 4 in)	83 kg (183 lb)	348 cm (11 ft 5 in)	330 cm (10 ft 10 in)	Sakai Blazers

== Russia ==
The following is the Russia roster in the 2013 FIVB Volleyball Men's World Grand Champions Cup.

#	Name	Date of Birth	Height	Weight	Spike	Block	Club
2	Sergey Makarov	28 March 1980	196 cm (6 ft 5 in)	97 kg (214 lb)	337 cm (11 ft 1 in)	329 cm (10 ft 10 in)	Kuzbass
3	Nikolay Apalikov	26 August 1982	203 cm (6 ft 8 in)	103 kg (227 lb)	353 cm (11 ft 7 in)	344 cm (11 ft 3 in)	ZENIT Kazan
5	Sergey Grankin	21 January 1985	195 cm (6 ft 5 in)	96 kg (212 lb)	351 cm (11 ft 6 in)	320 cm (10 ft 6 in)	Dinamo
6	Evgeny Sivozhelez	6 August 1986	196 cm (6 ft 5 in)	90 kg (200 lb)	330 cm (10 ft 10 in)	320 cm (10 ft 6 in)	Zenit Kazan
7	Nikolay Pavlov	22 May 1982	196 cm (6 ft 5 in)	93 kg (205 lb)	342 cm (11 ft 3 in)	321 cm (10 ft 6 in)	Gubernia
9	Alexey Spiridonov	26 June 1988	196 cm (6 ft 5 in)	96 kg (212 lb)	347 cm (11 ft 5 in)	328 cm (10 ft 9 in)	Zenit Kazan
10	Ilia Zhilin	10 May 1985	196 cm (6 ft 5 in)	80 kg (180 lb)	340 cm (11 ft 2 in)	320 cm (10 ft 6 in)	LOKOMOTIV NOVOSIBIRSK
11	Andrey Ashchev	10 May 1983	202 cm (6 ft 8 in)	105 kg (231 lb)	350 cm (11 ft 6 in)	338 cm (11 ft 1 in)	ZENIT Kazan
13	Dmitriy Muserskiy	29 October 1988	218 cm (7 ft 2 in)	104 kg (229 lb)	375 cm (12 ft 4 in)	347 cm (11 ft 5 in)	Belogorie
14	Artem Volvich	22 January 1990	208 cm (6 ft 10 in)	96 kg (212 lb)	350 cm (11 ft 6 in)	330 cm (10 ft 10 in)	Lokomotiv
15	Dmitriy Ilinykh	31 January 1987	201 cm (6 ft 7 in)	92 kg (203 lb)	338 cm (11 ft 1 in)	330 cm (10 ft 10 in)	Belogorie
17	Maxim Mikhaylov	19 March 1988	202 cm (6 ft 8 in)	103 kg (227 lb)	345 cm (11 ft 4 in)	330 cm (10 ft 10 in)	Zenit Kazan
18	Valentin Golubev	3 May 1992	190 cm (6 ft 3 in)	70 kg (150 lb)	310 cm (10 ft 2 in)	305 cm (10 ft 0 in)	Lokomotiv
20	Artem Ermakov	16 March 1982	188 cm (6 ft 2 in)	80 kg (180 lb)	323 cm (10 ft 7 in)	313 cm (10 ft 3 in)	Dinamo

== United States ==
The following is the United States roster in the 2013 FIVB Volleyball Men's World Grand Champions Cup.

#	Name	Date of Birth	Height	Weight	Spike	Block	Club
1	Matthew Anderson	18 April 1987	202 cm (6 ft 8 in)	100 kg (220 lb)	360 cm (11 ft 10 in)	332 cm (10 ft 11 in)	Zenit Kazan
2	Sean Rooney	13 November 1982	206 cm (6 ft 9 in)	100 kg (220 lb)	354 cm (11 ft 7 in)	336 cm (11 ft 0 in)	Woori Card Hansae
4	David Lee	8 March 1982	203 cm (6 ft 8 in)	105 kg (231 lb)	350 cm (11 ft 6 in)	325 cm (10 ft 8 in)	Lokomotiv Nobosibirsk
6	Paul Lotman	3 November 1985	200 cm (6 ft 7 in)	102 kg (225 lb)	336 cm (11 ft 0 in)	312 cm (10 ft 3 in)	Asseco Resovia
7	Kawika Shoji	11 November 1987	190 cm (6 ft 3 in)	79 kg (174 lb)	331 cm (10 ft 10 in)	315 cm (10 ft 4 in)	SCC Berlin
8	William Reid Priddy	1 October 1977	194 cm (6 ft 4 in)	89 kg (196 lb)	353 cm (11 ft 7 in)	330 cm (10 ft 10 in)	USA Men's Volleyball Team
9	Murphy Troy	31 May 1989	202 cm (6 ft 8 in)	99 kg (218 lb)	360 cm (11 ft 10 in)	350 cm (11 ft 6 in)	Trefl Gdansk S.A.
11	Micah Christenson	8 May 1993	198 cm (6 ft 6 in)	88 kg (194 lb)	349 cm (11 ft 5 in)	340 cm (11 ft 2 in)	Univ. of Southern California
13	Vaafuti Tavana	25 September 1987	200 cm (6 ft 7 in)	110 kg (240 lb)	360 cm (11 ft 10 in)	340 cm (11 ft 2 in)	Jakarta BNI 46
14	Jeffrey Menzel	31 October 1988	199 cm (6 ft 6 in)	92 kg (203 lb)	365 cm (12 ft 0 in)	360 cm (11 ft 10 in)	L0334 Maaseik
15	Carson Clark	20 January 1989	205 cm (6 ft 9 in)	93 kg (205 lb)	365 cm (12 ft 0 in)	360 cm (11 ft 10 in)	Olympiakos SFP Piraeus
17	Maxwell Holt	12 March 1987	205 cm (6 ft 9 in)	90 kg (200 lb)	351 cm (11 ft 6 in)	333 cm (10 ft 11 in)	Dinamo Moscow
19	Erik Shoji	24 August 1989	184 cm (6 ft 0 in)	83 kg (183 lb)	330 cm (10 ft 10 in)	321 cm (10 ft 6 in)	SCC Berlin
20	David Smith	15 May 1985	201 cm (6 ft 7 in)	86 kg (190 lb)	348 cm (11 ft 5 in)	314 cm (10 ft 4 in)	Tours Volley-Ball
