= 2010 FIVB Volleyball World League =

International sport competition

2010 World League
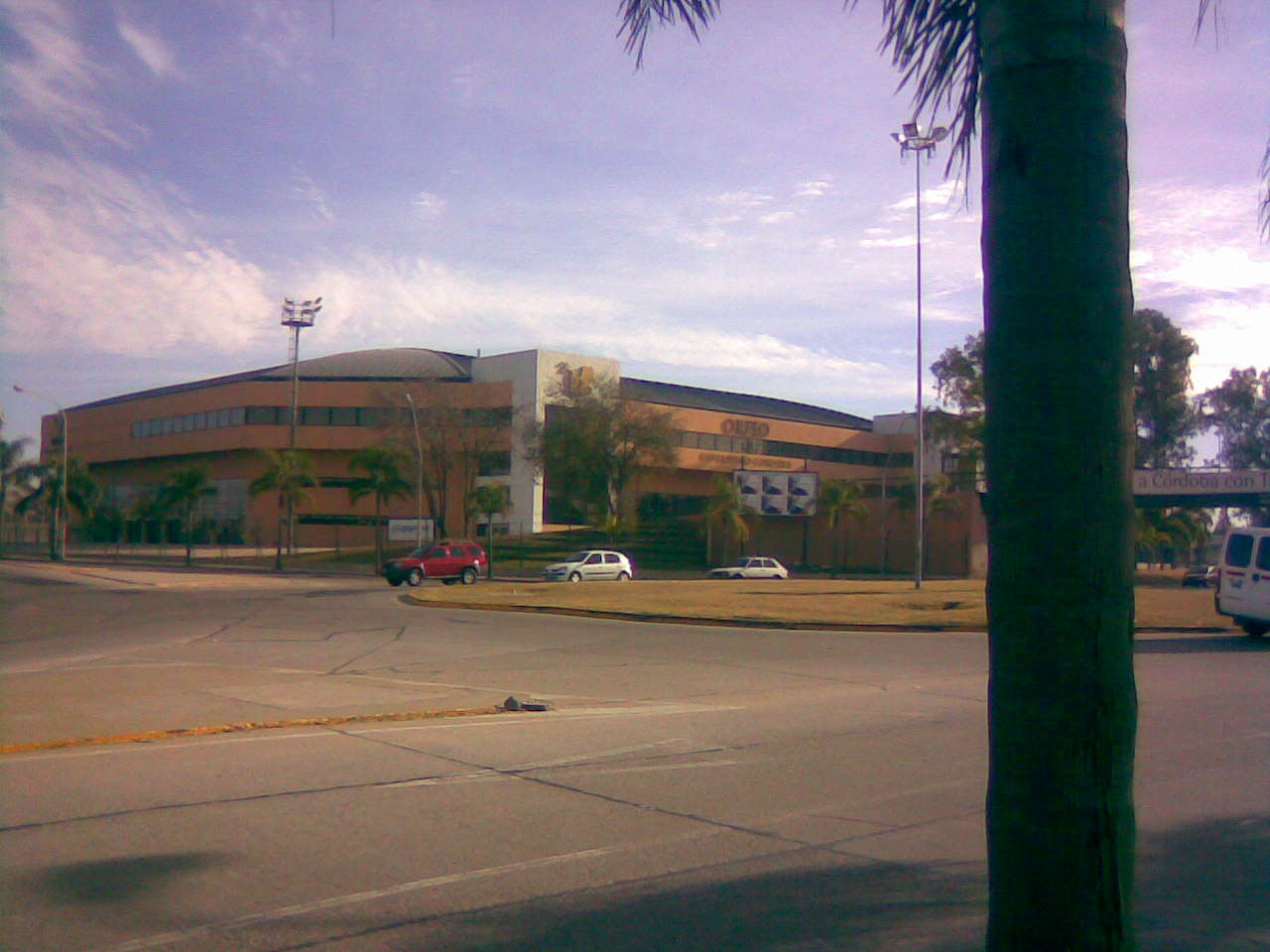
- The Orfeo Superdomo hosted the final round

Tournament details
- Host country: Argentina (Final)
- Dates: 4 June – 25 July
- Teams: 16
- Venues: 44 (in 44 host cities)

Final positions
- Champions: Brazil (9th title)

Tournament awards
- MVP: (Brazil) Murilo Endres

The 2010 FIVB Volleyball World League was the 21st edition of the annual men's international volleyball tournament, played by 16 countries from 4 June to 25 July 2010. The Final Round was held in Córdoba, Argentina.

== Qualification ==
- Top 14 teams of the 2009 edition directly qualified.
- Germany and Egypt qualified through the qualification.

Africa	Asia and Oceania	Europe	North America	South America
Egypt	China; South Korea	Bulgaria; Finland; France; Germany; Italy Netherlands; Poland; Russia; Serbia	Cuba; United States	Argentina; Brazil

== Pools composition ==
Pool A	Pool B	Pool C	Pool D
Brazil	Serbia	Russia	Cuba
Bulgaria	Italy	United States	Argentina
Netherlands	France	Finland	Poland
South Korea	China	Egypt	Germany

== Pool standing procedure ==
1. Match points
2. Number of matches won
3. Points ratio
4. Sets ratio
5. Result of the last match between the tied teams

Match won 3–0 or 3–1: 3 match points for the winner, 0 match points for the loser
Match won 3–2: 2 match points for the winner, 1 match point for the loser

== Intercontinental round ==
- All times are local.
- The Final Round hosts Argentina, the winners of each pool and the best second among all pools will qualify for the Final Round. If Argentina are ranked first in Pool D, the team ranked second of Pool D will qualify for the Final Round.

=== Pool A ===
Pos	Team	Pld	W	L	Pts	SPW	SPL	SPR	SW	SL	SR	Qualification
1	Brazil	12	11	1	30	1172	1028	1.140	33	16	2.063	Final round
2	Bulgaria	12	8	4	26	1029	956	1.076	30	13	2.308	
3	Netherlands	12	5	7	16	920	963	0.955	19	22	0.864	
4	South Korea	12	0	12	0	856	1030	0.831	5	36	0.139	

==== Week 1 ====
Date	Time		Score		Set 1	Set 2	Set 3	Set 4	Set 5	Total	Report
4 Jun	09:40	Brazil	3–1	Bulgaria	22–25	25–20	26–24	25–23		98–92	P2 P3
5 Jun	14:10	South Korea	0–3	Netherlands	23–25	21–25	20–25			64–75	P2 P3
5 Jun	09:40	Brazil	3–2	Bulgaria	24–26	25–19	25–15	22–25	15–9	111–94	P2 P3
6 Jun	14:10	South Korea	0–3	Netherlands	18–25	19–25	18–25			55–75	P2 P3

==== Week 2 ====
Date	Time		Score		Set 1	Set 2	Set 3	Set 4	Set 5	Total	Report
12 Jun	14:10	South Korea	0–3	Bulgaria	19–25	19–25	20–25			58–75	P2 P3
12 Jun	19:10	Brazil	0–3	Netherlands	24–26	23–25	23–25			70–76	P2 P3
13 Jun	14:10	South Korea	0–3	Bulgaria	22–25	21–25	22–25			65–75	P2 P3
13 Jun	19:11	Brazil	3–1	Netherlands	25–14	25–27	25–18	25–19		100–78	P2 P3

==== Week 3 ====
Date	Time		Score		Set 1	Set 2	Set 3	Set 4	Set 5	Total	Report
18 Jun	19:10	Brazil	3–1	South Korea	23–25	25–14	25–20	25–21		98–80	P2 P3
19 Jun	17:10	Netherlands	0–3	Bulgaria	19–25	22–25	23–25			64–75	P2 P3
19 Jun	19:10	Brazil	3–0	South Korea	25–19	25–15	25–19			75–53	P2 P3
20 Jun	15:10	Netherlands	0–3	Bulgaria	21–25	20–25	22–25			63–75	P2 P3

==== Week 4 ====
Date	Time		Score		Set 1	Set 2	Set 3	Set 4	Set 5	Total	Report
26 Jun	17:10	Netherlands	1–3	Brazil	20–25	25–23	24–26	16–25		85–99	P2 P3
26 Jun	19:10	Bulgaria	3–0	South Korea	25–23	25–20	25–16			75–59	P2 P3
27 Jun	15:10	Netherlands	2–3	Brazil	25–19	25–23	22–25	17–25	10–15	99–107	P2 P3
27 Jun	19:10	Bulgaria	3–1	South Korea	31–29	25–21	22–25	25–23		103–98	P2 P3

==== Week 5 ====
Date	Time		Score		Set 1	Set 2	Set 3	Set 4	Set 5	Total	Report
3 Jul	14:11	South Korea	1–3	Brazil	25–27	21–25	25–22	13–25		84–99	P2 P3
3 Jul	19:10	Bulgaria	3–0	Netherlands	25–9	25–17	27–25			77–51	P2 P3
4 Jul	14:10	South Korea	1–3	Brazil	18–25	23–25	25–23	15–25		81–98	P2 P3
4 Jul	19:00	Bulgaria	3–0	Netherlands	25–22	25–20	32–30			82–72	P2 P3

==== Week 6 ====
Date	Time		Score		Set 1	Set 2	Set 3	Set 4	Set 5	Total	Report
8 Jul	19:40	Netherlands	3–0	South Korea	31–29	28–26	25–21			84–76	P2 P3
8 Jul	20:10	Bulgaria	1–3	Brazil	22–25	23–25	25–23	24–26		94–99	P2 P3
9 Jul	18:10	Bulgaria	2–3	Brazil	21–25	26–24	31–29	22–25	12–15	112–118	P2 P3
9 Jul	19:40	Netherlands	3–1	South Korea	25–17	23–25	25–18	25–23		98–83	P2 P3

=== Pool B ===
Pos	Team	Pld	W	L	Pts	SPW	SPL	SPR	SW	SL	SR	Qualification
1	Italy	12	9	3	28	1098	999	1.099	33	15	2.200	Final round
2	Serbia	12	9	3	26	1109	1043	1.063	32	18	1.778	Final round
3	France	12	5	7	12	1073	1094	0.981	20	29	0.690	
4	China	12	1	11	6	916	1060	0.864	11	34	0.324	

==== Week 1 ====
Date	Time		Score		Set 1	Set 2	Set 3	Set 4	Set 5	Total	Report
4 Jun	20:25	Serbia	3–0	China	25–20	25–21	25–20			75–61	P2 P3
4 Jun	20:40	Italy	3–0	France	27–25	26–24	25–17			78–66	P2 P3
5 Jun	18:10	Italy	3–2	France	25–22	25–23	29–31	24–26	15–10	118–112	P2 P3
6 Jun	20:25	Serbia	3–1	China	25–18	25–21	22–25	25–14		97–78	P2 P3

==== Week 2 ====
Date	Time		Score		Set 1	Set 2	Set 3	Set 4	Set 5	Total	Report
10 Jun	20:40	France	0–3	Serbia	21–25	23–25	23–25			67–75	P2 P3
11 Jun	20:40	Italy	3–0	China	25–21	25–18	25–18			75–57	P2 P3
12 Jun	20:10	France	0–3	Serbia	20–25	21–25	21–25			62–75	P2 P3
13 Jun	18:10	Italy	3–0	China	25–15	25–22	25–22			75–59	P2 P3

==== Week 3 ====
Date	Time		Score		Set 1	Set 2	Set 3	Set 4	Set 5	Total	Report
18 Jun	20:10	Italy	2–3	Serbia	25–20	19–25	16–25	25–12	12–15	97–97	P2 P3
18 Jun	20:10	France	3–0	China	25–20	25–18	27–25			77–63	P2 P3
19 Jun	20:10	France	1–3	China	25–16	22–25	22–25	22–25		91–91	P2 P3
20 Jun	20:40	Italy	3–2	Serbia	21–25	25–20	25–18	20–25	15–13	106–101	P2 P3

==== Week 4 ====
Date	Time		Score		Set 1	Set 2	Set 3	Set 4	Set 5	Total	Report
25 Jun	20:42	France	3–2	Italy	19–25	25–19	25–20	17–25	15–13	101–102	P2 P3
26 Jun	16:10	China	1–3	Serbia	25–23	22–25	16–25	16–25		79–98	P2 P3
27 Jun	16:10	China	2–3	Serbia	25–21	23–25	17–25	25–21	11–15	101–107	P2 P3
27 Jun	18:10	France	1–3	Italy	19–25	22–25	25–23	23–25		89–98	P2 P3

==== Week 5 ====
Date	Time		Score		Set 1	Set 2	Set 3	Set 4	Set 5	Total	Report
2 Jul	19:10	China	0–3	Italy	20–25	22–25	20–25			62–75	P2 P3
2 Jul	17:10	Serbia	3–1	France	16–25	25–20	25–23	25–23		91–91	P2 P3
3 Jul	19:10	China	0–3	Italy	17–25	25–27	21–25			63–77	P2 P3
4 Jul	20:25	Serbia	2–3	France	23–25	25–18	25–21	20–25	8–15	101–104	P2 P3

==== Week 6 ====
Date	Time		Score		Set 1	Set 2	Set 3	Set 4	Set 5	Total	Report
7 Jul	17:10	Serbia	1–3	Italy	25–23	19–25	22–25	19–25		85–98	P2 P3
8 Jul	20:25	Serbia	3–2	Italy	21–25	21–25	25–23	25–20	15–6	107–99	P2 P3
9 Jul	16:00	China	2–3	France	21–25	22–25	25–22	25–23	14–16	107–111	P2 P3
10 Jul	16:00	China	2–3	France	16–25	25–18	25–19	21–25	8–15	95–102	P2 P3

=== Pool C ===
Pos	Team	Pld	W	L	Pts	SPW	SPL	SPR	SW	SL	SR	Qualification
1	Russia	12	10	2	29	1024	847	1.209	31	12	2.583	Final round
2	United States	12	8	4	23	1079	1082	0.997	28	21	1.333	
3	Finland	12	4	8	12	987	1042	0.947	18	28	0.643	
4	Egypt	12	2	10	8	973	1092	0.891	16	32	0.500	

==== Week 1 ====
Date	Time		Score		Set 1	Set 2	Set 3	Set 4	Set 5	Total	Report
4 Jun	18:10	Russia	3–0	United States	25–15	26–24	25–14			76–53	P2 P3
5 Jun	18:10	Russia	3–1	United States	25–14	25–22	21–25	25–21		96–82	P2 P3
5 Jun	18:40	Finland	2–3	Egypt	25–23	24–26	16–25	25–20	13–15	103–109	P2 P3
6 Jun	16:10	Finland	3–1	Egypt	25–22	23–25	25–20	25–19		98–86	P2 P3

==== Week 2 ====
Date	Time		Score		Set 1	Set 2	Set 3	Set 4	Set 5	Total	Report
11 Jun	18:10	Russia	3–1	Egypt	26–24	22–25	25–21	25–15		98–85	P2 P3
11 Jun	18:40	Finland	1–3	United States	27–25	18–25	25–27	18–25		88–102	P2 P3
12 Jun	18:10	Russia	3–2	Egypt	23–25	25–19	25–17	22–25	15–8	110–94	P2 P3
12 Jun	18:40	Finland	1–3	United States	25–18	23–25	21–25	26–28		95–96	P2 P3

==== Week 3 ====
Date	Time		Score		Set 1	Set 2	Set 3	Set 4	Set 5	Total	Report
18 Jun	18:10	Russia	3–0	Finland	25–16	25–21	25–18			75–55	P2 P3
18 Jun	19:10	United States	3–1	Egypt	25–19	25–15	14–25	25–21		89–80	P2 P3
19 Jun	18:10	Russia	3–1	Finland	25–18	25–16	18–25	25–18		93–77	P2 P3
19 Jun	19:10	United States	3–1	Egypt	25–20	25–22	11–25	25–14		86–81	P2 P3

==== Week 4 ====
Date	Time		Score		Set 1	Set 2	Set 3	Set 4	Set 5	Total	Report
25 Jun	20:10	Egypt	0–3	Russia	18–25	18–25	16–25			52–75	P2 P3
25 Jun	19:10	United States	2–3	Finland	22–25	25–14	20–25	25–19	11–15	103–98	P2 P3
26 Jun	20:10	Egypt	0–3	Russia	17–25	12–25	18–25			47–75	P2 P3
26 Jun	19:10	United States	3–1	Finland	25–21	18–25	25–19	25–23		93–88	P2 P3

==== Week 5 ====
Date	Time		Score		Set 1	Set 2	Set 3	Set 4	Set 5	Total	Report
2 Jul	18:40	Finland	0–3	Russia	20–25	19–25	14–25			53–75	P2 P3
2 Jul	20:10	Egypt	2–3	United States	25–20	29–31	17–25	25–21	12–15	108–112	P2 P3
3 Jul	18:40	Finland	3–1	Russia	25–18	18–25	25–23	25–19		93–85	P2 P3
3 Jul	20:10	Egypt	2–3	United States	25–20	18–25	25–19	22–25	16–18	106–107	P2 P3

==== Week 6 ====
Date	Time		Score		Set 1	Set 2	Set 3	Set 4	Set 5	Total	Report
7 Jul	20:10	Egypt	0–3	Finland	18–25	18–25	14–25			50–75	P2 P3
8 Jul	20:10	Egypt	3–0	Finland	25–23	25–19	25–22			75–64	P2 P3
9 Jul	19:10	United States	3–0	Russia	25–21	27–25	25–23			77–69	P2 P3
10 Jul	18:10	United States	1–3	Russia	18–25	25–22	17–25	19–25		79–97	P2 P3

=== Pool D ===
Pos	Team	Pld	W	L	Pts	SPW	SPL	SPR	SW	SL	SR	Qualification
1	Cuba	12	11	1	29	1112	1035	1.074	33	15	2.200	Final round
2	Germany	12	7	5	21	1102	1061	1.039	26	21	1.238	
3	Poland	12	6	6	19	1093	1084	1.008	24	24	1.000	
4	Argentina	12	0	12	3	1054	1181	0.892	13	36	0.361	Hosts for the Final round

==== Week 1 ====
Date	Time		Score		Set 1	Set 2	Set 3	Set 4	Set 5	Total	Report
4 Jun	20:50	Cuba	3–1	Argentina	25–23	25–20	21–25	25–18		96–86	P2 P3
5 Jun	19:40	Germany	3–1	Poland	23–25	25–18	25–22	26–24		99–89	P2 P3
5 Jun	20:50	Cuba	3–2	Argentina	32–34	25–23	20–25	25–17	15–13	117–112	P2 P3
6 Jun	15:10	Germany	3–0	Poland	28–26	30–28	25–18			83–72	P2 P3

==== Week 2 ====
Date	Time		Score		Set 1	Set 2	Set 3	Set 4	Set 5	Total	Report
11 Jun	21:20	Argentina	1–3	Poland	20–25	21–25	25–20	20–25		86–95	P2 P3
11 Jun	20:50	Cuba	3–0	Germany	26–24	25–18	25–19			76–61	P2 P3
12 Jun	21:20	Argentina	2–3	Poland	25–22	22–25	25–20	23–25	12–15	107–107	P2 P3
12 Jun	20:50	Cuba	3–1	Germany	25–22	25–23	21–25	25–17		96–87	P2 P3

==== Week 3 ====
Date	Time		Score		Set 1	Set 2	Set 3	Set 4	Set 5	Total	Report
18 Jun	21:17	Argentina	0–3	Germany	20–25	20–25	22–25			62–75	P2 P3
18 Jun	20:50	Cuba	3–2	Poland	19–25	25–16	17–25	25–23	15–10	101–99	P2 P3
19 Jun	21:17	Argentina	1–3	Germany	32–34	18–25	25–18	28–30		103–107	P2 P3
19 Jun	20:50	Cuba	0–3	Poland	25–27	23–25	12–25			60–77	P2 P3

==== Week 4 ====
Date	Time		Score		Set 1	Set 2	Set 3	Set 4	Set 5	Total	Report
25 Jun	20:10	Germany	2–3	Cuba	23–25	25–17	24–26	25–23	13–15	110–106	P2 P3
26 Jun	14:10	Germany	1–3	Cuba	21–25	24–26	25–17	22–25		92–93	P2 P3
26 Jun	15:30	Poland	3–1	Argentina	25–19	26–28	27–25	25–22		103–94	P2 P3
27 Jun	18:10	Poland	3–1	Argentina	22–25	25–17	25–20	25–21		97–83	P2 P3

==== Week 5 ====
Date	Time		Score		Set 1	Set 2	Set 3	Set 4	Set 5	Total	Report
30 Jun	19:40	Germany	3–1	Argentina	25–18	17–25	25–15	25–17		92–75	P2 P3
1 Jul	19:40	Germany	3–1	Argentina	25–19	23–25	25–21	25–19		98–84	P2 P3
3 Jul	14:10	Poland	0–3	Cuba	21–25	22–25	24–26			67–76	P2 P3
4 Jul	16:40	Poland	1–3	Cuba	19–25	22–25	25–22	16–25		82–97	P2 P3

==== Week 6 ====
Date	Time		Score		Set 1	Set 2	Set 3	Set 4	Set 5	Total	Report
8 Jul	20:10	Poland	2–3	Germany	21–25	25–20	22–25	25–23	11–15	104–108	P2 P3
8 Jul	21:20	Argentina	2–3	Cuba	18–25	20–25	32–30	25–23	8–15	103–118	P2 P3
9 Jul	20:10	Poland	3–1	Germany	25–27	26–24	25–21	25–18		101–90	P2 P3
9 Jul	21:20	Argentina	0–3	Cuba	16–25	24–26	19–25			59–76	P2 P3

== Final round ==
- Venue: Orfeo Superdomo, Córdoba, Argentina
- All times are Argentina Time (UTC−03:00).

=== Pool play ===
Qualified for the Semifinals

==== Pool E ====
Pos	Team	Pld	W	L	Pts	SPW	SPL	SPR	SW	SL	SR	Qualification
1	Brazil	2	2	0	4	212	203	1.044	6	4	1.500	Semifinals
2	Serbia	2	1	1	4	184	168	1.095	5	3	1.667	Semifinals
3	Argentina	2	0	2	1	160	185	0.865	2	6	0.333	

Date	Time		Score		Set 1	Set 2	Set 3	Set 4	Set 5	Total	Report
21 Jul	21:10	Brazil	3–2	Argentina	25–17	23–25	25–20	19–25	15–10	107–97	P2 P3
22 Jul	21:10	Serbia	2–3	Brazil	25–21	22–25	25–18	20–25	14–16	106–105	P2 P3
23 Jul	21:10	Argentina	0–3	Serbia	19–25	18–25	26–28			63–78	P2 P3

==== Pool F ====
Pos	Team	Pld	W	L	Pts	SPW	SPL	SPR	SW	SL	SR	Qualification
1	Russia	2	2	0	4	221	192	1.151	6	4	1.500	Semifinals
2	Cuba	2	1	1	4	182	182	1.000	5	3	1.667	Semifinals
3	Italy	2	0	2	1	167	196	0.852	2	6	0.333	

Date	Time		Score		Set 1	Set 2	Set 3	Set 4	Set 5	Total	Report
21 Jul	17:40	Italy	2–3	Russia	14–25	25–22	24–26	25–23	7–15	95–111	P2 P3
22 Jul	17:30	Russia	3–2	Cuba	23–25	25–14	25–20	22–25	15–13	110–97	P2 P3
23 Jul	17:40	Cuba	3–0	Italy	25–17	35–33	25–22			85–72	P2 P3

=== Final four ===
Semifinals
24 July
Russia	3
Serbia	0
24 July
Brazil	3
Cuba	1

Final
25 July
Russia	1
Brazil	3
3rd place match
25 July
Serbia	3
Cuba	2

==== Semifinals ====
Date	Time		Score		Set 1	Set 2	Set 3	Set 4	Set 5	Total	Report
24 Jul	17:40	Russia	3–0	Serbia	26–24	25–15	25–20			76–59	P2 P3
24 Jul	21:10	Brazil	3–1	Cuba	21–25	25–19	25–21	25–20		96–85	P2 P3

==== 3rd place match ====
Date	Time		Score		Set 1	Set 2	Set 3	Set 4	Set 5	Total	Report
25 Jul	17:40	Serbia	3–2	Cuba	28–30	25–20	22–25	25–22	15–12	115–109	P2 P3

==== Final ====
Date	Time		Score		Set 1	Set 2	Set 3	Set 4	Set 5	Total	Report
25 Jul	21:10	Russia	1–3	Brazil	22–25	22–25	25–16	23–25		92–91	P2 P3

== Final standing ==
Rank	Team
1st place, gold medalist(s)	Brazil
2nd place, silver medalist(s)	Russia
3rd place, bronze medalist(s)	Serbia
4	Cuba
5	Argentina
6	Italy
7	Bulgaria
8	United States
9	Germany
10	Poland
11	Netherlands
12	France
13	Finland
14	Egypt
15	China
16	South Korea

2010 World League champions

Brazil
9th title

14-man Roster for Final Round
Bruno, Sidão, Vissotto, Giba (c), Murilo, Théo, Thiago, João Paulo, Rodrigão, Maurício, Lucas, Marlon, Dante, Mário Jr.
Head coach
Bernardinho

== Awards ==
- Most valuable player
  (Brazil) Murilo Endres
- Best scorer
  (Russia) Maxim Mikhaylov
- Best spiker
  (Russia) Maxim Mikhaylov
- Best blocker
  (Russia) Dmitriy Muserskiy
- Best server
  (Cuba) Yoandy Leal
- Best setter
  (Russia) Sergey Grankin
- Best libero
  (Brazil) Mário Pedreira
