= 2009 Asian Men's Volleyball Championship =

International volleyball tournament

Tournament details
- Host country: Philippines
- City: Manila
- Dates: 27 September – 5 October
- Teams: 18
- Venues: 2 (in 1 host city)

Final positions
- Champions: Japan (7th title)
- Runners-up: Iran
- Third place: South Korea
- Fourth place: China

Tournament awards
- MVP: (Japan) Tatsuya Fukuzawa

The Asian Men's Volleyball Championship was the fifteenth staging of the Asian Men's Volleyball Championship, a biennial international volleyball tournament organised by the Asian Volleyball Confederation (AVC) with Philippine Volleyball Federation (PVF). The tournament was held in Manila, Philippines from 27 September to 5 October 2009.

== Venues ==
Manila, Philippines
Ninoy Aquino Stadium	San Andres Gymnasium
Capacity: 6,000	Capacity: 5,000

== Pools composition ==
The teams are seeded by addition of ranking of 2007 Asian Men's Volleyball Championship and FIVB World Rankings divided by 2.

Pool A	Pool B	Pool C	Pool D
Philippines (Host); Chinese Taipei (7th); ~~Pakistan~~ * Kazakhstan; Myanmar	Japan (1st); Thailand (6th); India; ~~Afghanistan~~ * Indonesia	China (2nd); Iran (5th); Sri Lanka; Hong Kong; Vietnam	Australia (3rd); South Korea (4th); Maldives; Lebanon; Qatar

* Withdrew

== Preliminary round ==
- All times are Philippine Standard Time (UTC+8:00).

=== Pool A ===
Pos	Team	Pld	W	L	Pts	SW	SL	SR	SPW	SPL	SPR	Qualification
1	Kazakhstan	3	3	0	6	9	1	9.000	250	194	1.289	Final eight (Pools E and F)
2	Chinese Taipei	3	2	1	5	6	6	1.000	255	259	0.985	Final eight (Pools E and F)
3	Myanmar	3	1	2	4	6	8	0.750	298	311	0.958	9th–16th place (Pools G and H)
4	Philippines	3	0	3	3	3	9	0.333	240	279	0.860	9th–16th place (Pools G and H)

Date	Time		Score		Set 1	Set 2	Set 3	Set 4	Set 5	Total	Report
27 Sep	18:00	Myanmar	3–2	Philippines	21–25	25–21	19–25	25–22	17–15	107–108	Report
28 Sep	21:00	Chinese Taipei	3–2	Myanmar	22–25	16–25	25–22	25–22	15–9	103–103	Report
29 Sep	14:00	Kazakhstan	3–0	Philippines	25–19	25–14	25–18			75–51	Report
30 Sep	16:00	Chinese Taipei	0–3	Kazakhstan	23–25	17–25	15–25			55–75	Report
01 Oct	16:00	Kazakhstan	3–1	Myanmar	25–16	25–21	22–25	28–26		100–88	Report
01 Oct	18:00	Philippines	1–3	Chinese Taipei	25–22	19–25	19–25	18–25		81–97	Report

=== Pool B ===
Pos	Team	Pld	W	L	Pts	SW	SL	SR	SPW	SPL	SPR	Qualification
1	Japan	3	3	0	6	9	1	9.000	249	209	1.191	Final eight (Pools E and F)
2	Indonesia	3	2	1	5	6	4	1.500	224	225	0.996	Final eight (Pools E and F)
3	India	3	1	2	4	5	6	0.833	246	248	0.992	9th–16th place (Pools G and H)
4	Thailand	3	0	3	3	0	9	0.000	188	225	0.836	9th–16th place (Pools G and H)

Date	Time		Score		Set 1	Set 2	Set 3	Set 4	Set 5	Total	Report
27 Sep	10:00	India	1–3	Indonesia	25–13	22–25	23–25	16–25		86–88	Report
28 Sep	09:00	Indonesia	3–0	Thailand	25–23	25–21	25–20			75–64	Report
28 Sep	17:00	Japan	3–1	India	25–17	24–26	25–20	25–22		99–85	Report
29 Sep	18:00	Thailand	0–3	Japan	19–25	23–25	21–25			63–75	Report
30 Sep	18:00	India	3–0	Thailand	25–18	25–20	25–23			75–61	Report
01 Oct	12:00	Indonesia	0–3	Japan	21–25	21–25	19–25			61–75	Report

=== Pool C ===
Pos	Team	Pld	W	L	Pts	SW	SL	SR	SPW	SPL	SPR	Qualification
1	Iran	4	4	0	8	12	3	4.000	356	277	1.285	Final eight (Pools E and F)
2	China	4	3	1	7	11	3	3.667	326	266	1.226	Final eight (Pools E and F)
3	Vietnam	4	2	2	6	6	6	1.000	249	266	0.936	9th–16th place (Pools G and H)
4	Sri Lanka	4	1	3	5	4	9	0.444	264	297	0.889	9th–16th place (Pools G and H)
5	Hong Kong	4	0	4	4	0	12	0.000	211	300	0.703	17th–18th place

Date	Time		Score		Set 1	Set 2	Set 3	Set 4	Set 5	Total	Report
27 Sep	12:00	Sri Lanka	3–0	Hong Kong	25–20	25–16	25–18			75–54	Report
27 Sep	16:00	China	3–0	Vietnam	25–14	25–23	25–14			75–51	Report
28 Sep	13:00	Iran	3–1	Sri Lanka	18–25	25–16	25–15	25–17		93–73	Report
28 Sep	15:00	Hong Kong	0–3	China	15–25	11–25	14–25			40–75	Report
29 Sep	10:00	Vietnam	3–0	Hong Kong	25–23	25–17	25–22			75–62	Report
29 Sep	16:00	China	2–3	Iran	28–26	20–25	22–25	25–22	6–15	101–113	Report
30 Sep	14:00	Iran	3–0	Vietnam	25–21	25–10	25–17			75–48	Report
30 Sep	16:00	Sri Lanka	0–3	China	22–25	23–25	17–25			62–75	Report
01 Oct	14:00	Vietnam	3–0	Sri Lanka	25–20	25–18	25–16			75–54	Report
01 Oct	16:00	Hong Kong	0–3	Iran	15–25	17–25	23–25			55–75	Report

=== Pool D ===
Pos	Team	Pld	W	L	Pts	SW	SL	SR	SPW	SPL	SPR	Qualification
1	South Korea	4	4	0	8	12	3	4.000	378	287	1.317	Final eight (Pools E and F)
2	Australia	4	3	1	7	10	5	2.000	352	305	1.154	Final eight (Pools E and F)
3	Lebanon	4	2	2	6	7	6	1.167	286	262	1.092	9th–16th place (Pools G and H)
4	Qatar	4	1	3	5	6	10	0.600	341	373	0.914	9th–16th place (Pools G and H)
5	Maldives	4	0	4	4	1	12	0.083	195	325	0.600	17th–18th place

Date	Time		Score		Set 1	Set 2	Set 3	Set 4	Set 5	Total	Report
27 Sep	14:00	Maldives	0–3	South Korea	11–25	13–25	12–25			36–75	Report
27 Sep	20:00	Australia	3–1	Lebanon	25–20	25–18	17–25	25–23		92–86	Report
28 Sep	11:00	Qatar	2–3	South Korea	25–21	14–25	14–25	41–39	18–20	112–130	Report
28 Sep	19:00	Maldives	0–3	Australia	17–25	13–25	12–25			42–75	Report
29 Sep	12:00	Lebanon	3–0	Maldives	25–19	25–13	25–13			75–45	Report
29 Sep	20:00	Australia	3–1	Qatar	25–16	21–25	25–21	25–17		96–79	Report
30 Sep	12:00	South Korea	3–1	Australia	25–20	23–25	25–21	25–23		98–89	Report
30 Sep	18:00	Qatar	0–3	Lebanon	17–25	16–25	17–25			50–75	Report
01 Oct	14:00	Lebanon	0–3	South Korea	19–25	14–25	17–25			50–75	Report
01 Oct	18:00	Maldives	1–3	Qatar	12–25	19–25	27–25	14–25		72–100	Report

== Classification round ==
- All times are Philippine Standard Time (UTC+8:00).
- The results and the points of the matches between the same teams that were already played during the preliminary round shall be taken into account for the classification round.

=== Pool E ===
Pos	Team	Pld	W	L	Pts	SW	SL	SR	SPW	SPL	SPR	Qualification
1	Iran	3	3	0	6	9	4	2.250	309	269	1.149	Semifinals
2	China	3	2	1	5	8	4	2.000	272	261	1.042	Semifinals
3	Kazakhstan	3	1	2	4	4	6	0.667	227	229	0.991	5th–8th place semifinals
4	Chinese Taipei	3	0	3	3	2	9	0.222	219	268	0.817	5th–8th place semifinals

Date	Time		Score		Set 1	Set 2	Set 3	Set 4	Set 5	Total	Report
02 Oct	16:00	Kazakhstan	0–3	China	18–25	23–25	20–25			61–75	Report
02 Oct	18:00	Iran	3–1	Chinese Taipei	22–25	25–16	25–21	25–15		97–77	Report
03 Oct	16:00	Chinese Taipei	1–3	China	25–18	17–25	26–28	19–25		87–96	Report
03 Oct	18:00	Kazakhstan	1–3	Iran	26–24	21–25	21–25	23–25		91–99	Report

=== Pool F ===
Pos	Team	Pld	W	L	Pts	SW	SL	SR	SPW	SPL	SPR	Qualification
1	Japan	3	3	0	6	9	0	MAX	231	195	1.185	Semifinals
2	South Korea	3	2	1	5	6	4	1.500	246	216	1.139	Semifinals
3	Indonesia	3	1	2	4	3	8	0.375	215	256	0.840	5th–8th place semifinals
4	Australia	3	0	3	3	3	9	0.333	256	281	0.911	5th–8th place semifinals

Date	Time		Score		Set 1	Set 2	Set 3	Set 4	Set 5	Total	Report
02 Oct	12:00	South Korea	3–0	Indonesia	25–17	25–15	25–15			75–47	Report
02 Oct	14:00	Japan	3–0	Australia	26–24	25–18	25–19			76–61	Report
03 Oct	12:00	Japan	3–0	South Korea	30–28	25–22	25–23			80–73	Report
03 Oct	14:00	Indonesia	3–2	Australia	26–24	21–25	25–22	20–25	15–10	107–106	Report

=== Pool G ===
Pos	Team	Pld	W	L	Pts	SW	SL	SR	SPW	SPL	SPR	Qualification
1	Myanmar	3	3	0	6	9	5	1.800	317	288	1.101	9th–12th place semifinals
2	Vietnam	3	2	1	5	7	3	2.333	238	207	1.150	9th–12th place semifinals
3	Sri Lanka	3	1	2	4	5	6	0.833	225	259	0.869	13th–16th place semifinals
4	Philippines	3	0	3	3	2	9	0.222	235	261	0.900	13th–16th place semifinals

Date	Time		Score		Set 1	Set 2	Set 3	Set 4	Set 5	Total	Report
02 Oct	12:00	Myanmar	3–2	Sri Lanka	25–18	21–25	25–15	25–27	15–7	111–92	Report
02 Oct	18:00	Vietnam	3–0	Philippines	25–16	25–20	25–18			75–54	Report
03 Oct	14:00	Philippines	0–3	Sri Lanka	23–25	24–26	26–28			73–79	Report
03 Oct	16:00	Myanmar	3–1	Vietnam	25–19	24–26	25–22	25–21		99–88	Report

=== Pool H ===
Pos	Team	Pld	W	L	Pts	SW	SL	SR	SPW	SPL	SPR	Qualification
1	India	3	3	0	6	9	0	MAX	225	160	1.406	9th–12th place semifinals
2	Lebanon	3	2	1	5	6	4	1.500	222	221	1.005	9th–12th place semifinals
3	Thailand	3	1	2	4	4	7	0.571	255	264	0.966	13th–16th place semifinals
4	Qatar	3	0	3	3	1	9	0.111	191	248	0.770	13th–16th place semifinals

Date	Time		Score		Set 1	Set 2	Set 3	Set 4	Set 5	Total	Report
02 Oct	14:00	India	3–0	Qatar	25–14	25–22	25–15			75–51	Report
02 Oct	16:00	Lebanon	3–1	Thailand	28–26	21–25	25–23	25–22		99–96	Report
03 Oct	12:00	Thailand	3–1	Qatar	23–25	25–23	25–22	25–20		98–90	Report
03 Oct	18:00	India	3–0	Lebanon	25–16	25–19	25–13			75–48	Report

== Classification 17th–18th ==
Date	Time		Score		Set 1	Set 2	Set 3	Set 4	Set 5	Total	Report
03 Oct	10:00	Hong Kong	3–2	Maldives	25–23	24–26	25–17	15–25	15–8	104–99	Report

== Classification 13th–16th ==
13th–16th places
4 October – Manila
Sri Lanka	0
Qatar	3
4 October – Manila
Thailand	3
Philippines	0

13th place
5 October – Manila
Qatar	0
Thailand	3
15th place
5 October – Manila
Sri Lanka	0
Philippines	3

=== 13th–16th Semifinals ===
Date	Time		Score		Set 1	Set 2	Set 3	Set 4	Set 5	Total	Report
04 Oct	12:00	Sri Lanka	0–3	Qatar	19–25	16–25	22–25			57–75	Report
04 Oct	14:00	Thailand	3–0	Philippines	25–18	29–27	25–18			79–63	Report

=== 15th place ===
Date	Time		Score		Set 1	Set 2	Set 3	Set 4	Set 5	Total	Report
05 Oct^{[1]}	10:00	Sri Lanka	0–3	Philippines	0–25	0–25	0–25			0–75	

1.Sri Lanka forfeited the match on 5 October giving Philippines a 3–0 win.

=== 13th place ===
Date	Time		Score		Set 1	Set 2	Set 3	Set 4	Set 5	Total	Report
05 Oct	12:00	Qatar	0–3	Thailand	17–25	24–26	21–25			62–76	Report

== Classification 9th–12th ==
9th–12th places
4 October – Manila
Myanmar	3
Lebanon	1
4 October – Manila
India	3
Vietnam	0

9th place
5 October – Manila
Myanmar	0
India	3
11th place
5 October – Manila
Lebanon	3
Vietnam	0

=== 9th–12th Semifinals ===
Date	Time		Score		Set 1	Set 2	Set 3	Set 4	Set 5	Total	Report
04 Oct	16:00	Myanmar	3–1	Lebanon	21–25	25–18	26–24	25–21		97–88	Report
04 Oct	18:00	India	3–0	Vietnam	25–23	25–18	25–15			75–56	Report

=== 11th place ===
Date	Time		Score		Set 1	Set 2	Set 3	Set 4	Set 5	Total	Report
05 Oct	14:00	Lebanon	3–0	Vietnam	25–23	26–24	25–22			76–69	Report

=== 9th place ===
Date	Time		Score		Set 1	Set 2	Set 3	Set 4	Set 5	Total	Report
05 Oct	16:00	Myanmar	0–3	India	21–25	16–25	16–25			53–75	Report

== Classification 5th–8th ==
5th–8th places
4 October – Manila
Kazakhstan	3
Australia	2
4 October – Manila
Indonesia	3
Chinese Taipei	2

5th place
5 October – Manila
Kazakhstan	3
Indonesia	1
7th place
5 October – Manila
Australia	3
Chinese Taipei	0

=== 5th–8th Semifinals ===
Date	Time		Score		Set 1	Set 2	Set 3	Set 4	Set 5	Total	Report
04 Oct	12:00	Kazakhstan	3–2	Australia	17–25	25–21	13–25	25–22	15–11	95–104	Report
04 Oct	14:00	Indonesia	3–2	Chinese Taipei	25–18	20–25	19–25	27–25	15–9	106–102	Report

=== 7th place ===
Date	Time		Score		Set 1	Set 2	Set 3	Set 4	Set 5	Total	Report
05 Oct	12:00	Australia	3–0	Chinese Taipei	25–15	25–21	25–14			75–50	Report

=== 5th place ===
Date	Time		Score		Set 1	Set 2	Set 3	Set 4	Set 5	Total	Report
05 Oct	14:00	Kazakhstan	3–1	Indonesia	25–18	22–25	25–10	25–17		97–70	Report

== Final round ==
Semifinals
4 October – Manila
Iran	3
South Korea	2
4 October – Manila
Japan	3
China	2

Final
5 October – Manila
Iran	1
Japan	3
3rd place
5 October – Manila
South Korea	3
China	1

=== Semifinals ===
Date	Time		Score		Set 1	Set 2	Set 3	Set 4	Set 5	Total	Report
04 Oct	16:00	Iran	3–2	South Korea	24–26	25–20	26–28	25–17	15–11	115–102	Report
04 Oct	18:00	Japan	3–2	China	20–25	23–25	25–22	28–26	15–10	111–108	Report

=== 3rd place ===
Date	Time		Score		Set 1	Set 2	Set 3	Set 4	Set 5	Total	Report
05 Oct	16:00	South Korea	3–1	China	25–23	25–22	22–25	25–23		97–93	Report

=== Final ===
Date	Time		Score		Set 1	Set 2	Set 3	Set 4	Set 5	Total	Report
05 Oct	18:00	Iran	1–3	Japan	25–19	18–25	23–25	22–25		88–94	Report

== Final standing ==
Rank	Team
1st place, gold medalist(s)	Japan
2nd place, silver medalist(s)	Iran
3rd place, bronze medalist(s)	South Korea
4	China
5	Kazakhstan
6	Indonesia
7	Australia
8	Chinese Taipei
9	India
10	Myanmar
11	Lebanon
12	Vietnam
13	Thailand
14	Qatar
15	Philippines
16	Sri Lanka
17	Hong Kong
18	Maldives

Qualified for the 2009 World Grand Champions Cup
Already qualified as hosts for the 2009 World Grand Champions Cup

2009 Asian Men's champions

Japan
7th title

Team Roster
Yuta Abe, Takeshi Nagano, Yusuke Matsuta, Daisuke Usami, Takeshi Kitajima, Kazuki Maeda, Yoshihiko Matsumoto, Kunihiro Shimizu, Tatsuya Fukuzawa, Takaaki Tomimatsu, Yusuke Ishijima, Yuta Yoneyama
Head Coach: Tatsuya Ueta

== Awards ==
- MVP: (Japan) Tatsuya Fukuzawa
- Best scorer: (South Korea) Kim Yo-han
- Best spiker: (Indonesia) Andri Widiatmoko
- Best blocker: (Iran) Mohammad Mousavi
- Best server: (South Korea) Kim Yo-han
- Best setter: (South Korea) Han Sun-soo
- Best receiver: (South Korea) Yeo Oh-hyun
- Best libero: (South Korea) Yeo Oh-hyun
- Most Popular Player: (Iran) Saeid Marouf
