= Kunihiro Shimizu =

Japanese volleyball player

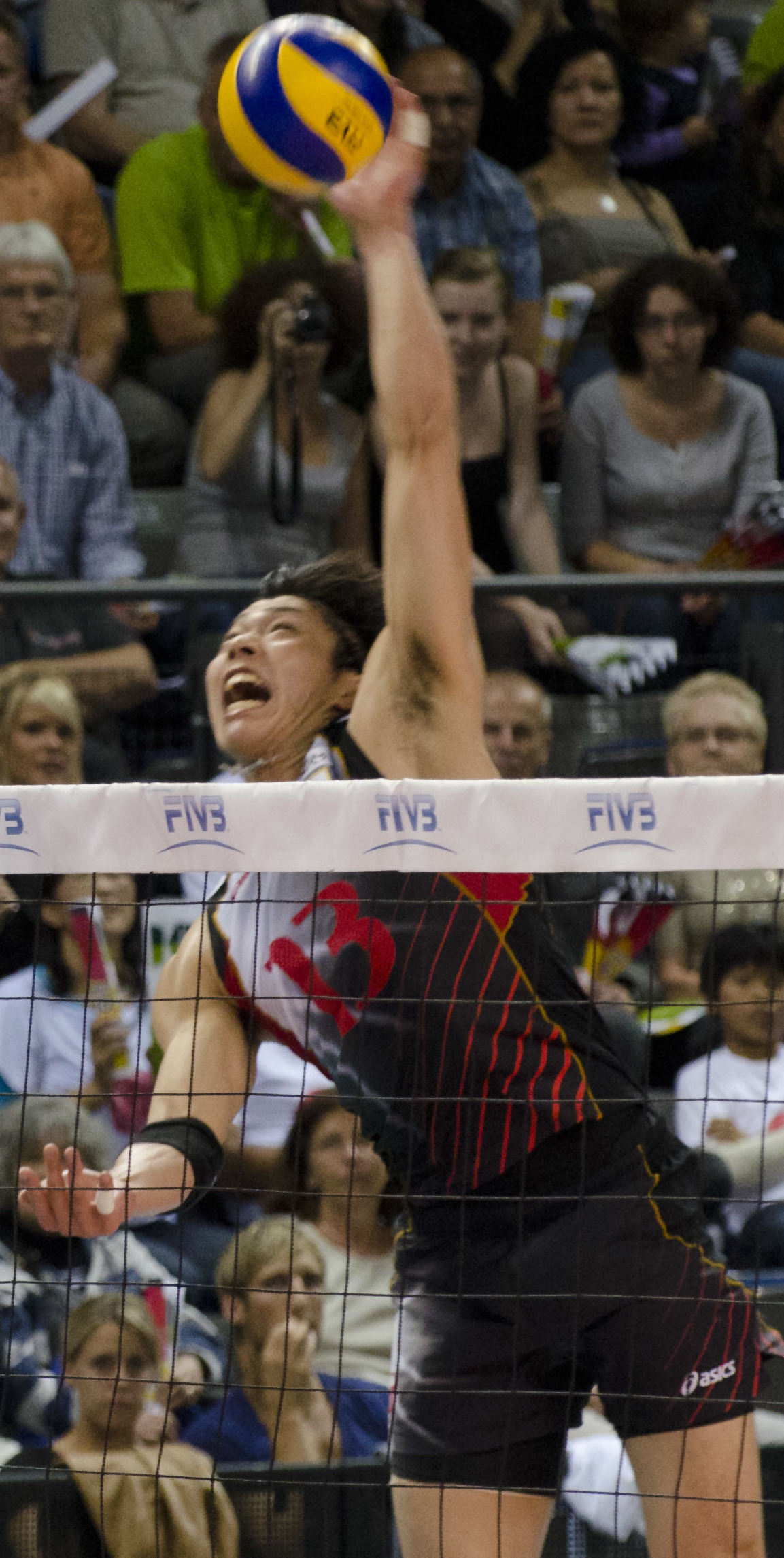

Personal information
- Full name: Kunihiro Shimizu
- Nickname: Gori
- Born: August 11, 1986 (age 40); Fukui City, Fukui, Japan
- Height: 1.93 m (6 ft 4 in)
- Weight: 97 kg (214 lb)
- Spike: 345 cm (136 in)
- Block: 330 cm (130 in)

Volleyball information
- Position: Opposite
- Current club: Osaka Bluteon (Note: The club's former name is Panasonic Panthers)
- Number: 1

National team
2007–2021	Japan
Medal record
Men's volleyball
Representing Japan
World Grand Champions Cup
Bronze medal – third place	Osaka/Nagoya 2009	Team
Asian Games
Gold medal – first place	2010 Guangzhou	Team
Silver medal – second place	2014 Incheon	Team
Asian Championship
Gold medal – first place	2009 Manila	Team
Gold medal – first place	2015 Tehran	Team
Gold medal – first place	2017 Gresik	Team
Bronze medal – third place	2019 Tehran	Team

Kunihiro Shimizu (清水邦広, Shimizu Kunihiro; born 11 August 1986) is a Japanese former professional volleyball player who played for the Japan national team. A one-club man, he spent his entire professional career with Osaka Bluteon.

He announced his retirement from the national team after finishing seventh place in 2020 Summer Olympics, total of 14 years in the team. Shimizu was crowned the Most Valuable Player (MVP) in Asian Championship 2015.

== Personal life ==
Shimizu was married to singer Mika Nakashima, both met in 2011 and got married in 2014. In 2018, both decided to divorce due to difficulty in making time for each other.

== Clubs ==
- (Japan) Fukui University Fukui Junior and Senior High School
- (Japan) Tokai University (2005–2009)
- (Japan) Osaka Bluteon (2009–2026)

== Awards ==
=== Individuals ===
- 2009: 58th Kurowashi Tournament – MVP, Best 6
- 2009: World Grand Champions Cup – Best Scorer
- 2009: 2009/10 V.Premier League – MVP, Best Spike, Best 6
- 2010 Kurowashiki Tournament Best6
- 2010–2011 Men's V.Premier League – Best 6
- 2011–2012 Men's V.Premier League – Best 6
- 2013–14 Men's V.Premier League MVP, Best 6
- 2014: 63rd Kurowashi Tournament – Most Valuable Player
- 2015: Asian Championship – Most Valuable Player
- 2015–2016 Men's V.Premier League Fighting Spirit Award, Best 6

=== Team ===
- 2009 Kurowashiki All Japan Volleyball Championship – Champion, with Panasonic Panthers.
- 2009–2010 V.Premier League – Champion, with Panasonic Panthers.
- 2010 Kurowashiki All Japan Volleyball Championship – Champion, with Panasonic Panthers.
- 2011–2012 V.Premier League – Champion, with Panasonic Panthers.
- 2012 Kurowashiki All Japan Volleyball Championship – Champion, with Panasonic Panthers.
- 2012–2013 V.Premier League – Runner-Up, with Panasonic Panthers.
- 2013 Kurowashiki All Japan Volleyball Championship – Runner-Up, with Panasonic Panthers.
- 2013–2014 V.Premier League – Champion, with Panasonic Panthers.
- 2014 Kurowashiki All Japan Volleyball Championship – Champion, with Panasonic Panthers.

== National team ==
=== Senior team ===
- 2007: World Cup – 9th place
- 2007: World League – 13th place
- 2008: Summer Olympics – 11th place
- 2008: World League – 6th place
- 2009: World League – 15th place
- 2009: Asian Championship – (gold) Gold Medal
- 2009: World Grand Champions Cup – (bronze) Bronze Medal
- 2010: Asian Games – (gold) Gold Medal
- 2011: World League – 15th place
- 2011: World Cup – 10th place
- 2012: World League – 15th place
- 2013: Asian Championship – 4th place
- 2013: World League – 18th place
- 2014: World League – 19th place
- 2014: Asian Games – (silver) Silver Medal
- 2015: Asian Championship – (gold) Gold Medal
- 2015: World Cup — 6th place
- 2015: World League — 13th place (tied)
- 2016: World League — 24th place
- 2019: Nations League — 10th place
- 2019: World Cup — 4th place
- 2019: Asian Championship — (bronze) Bronze Medal
- 2021: Nations League — 11th place
- 2021: Summer Olympics — 7th place

== Personal life ==
Shimizu married singer Mika Nakashima in 2014. On February 2, 2018, Nakashima announced that she and Shimizu were getting a divorce. The decision was mutual, as they both agreed that they don't see each other enough and that it would be best to divorce. They both agreed that the time they spent together was irreplaceable. There are no hard feelings and they will remain friends and continue to support each other and pursue their dreams.

In January 2022, he married TV Osaka reporter, Nana Sakamoto, who is 7 years his junior. He and his wife welcomed their first child, a daughter, born on September 3, 2022.
