= João Paulo Tavares =

Brazilian volleyball player (born 1983)

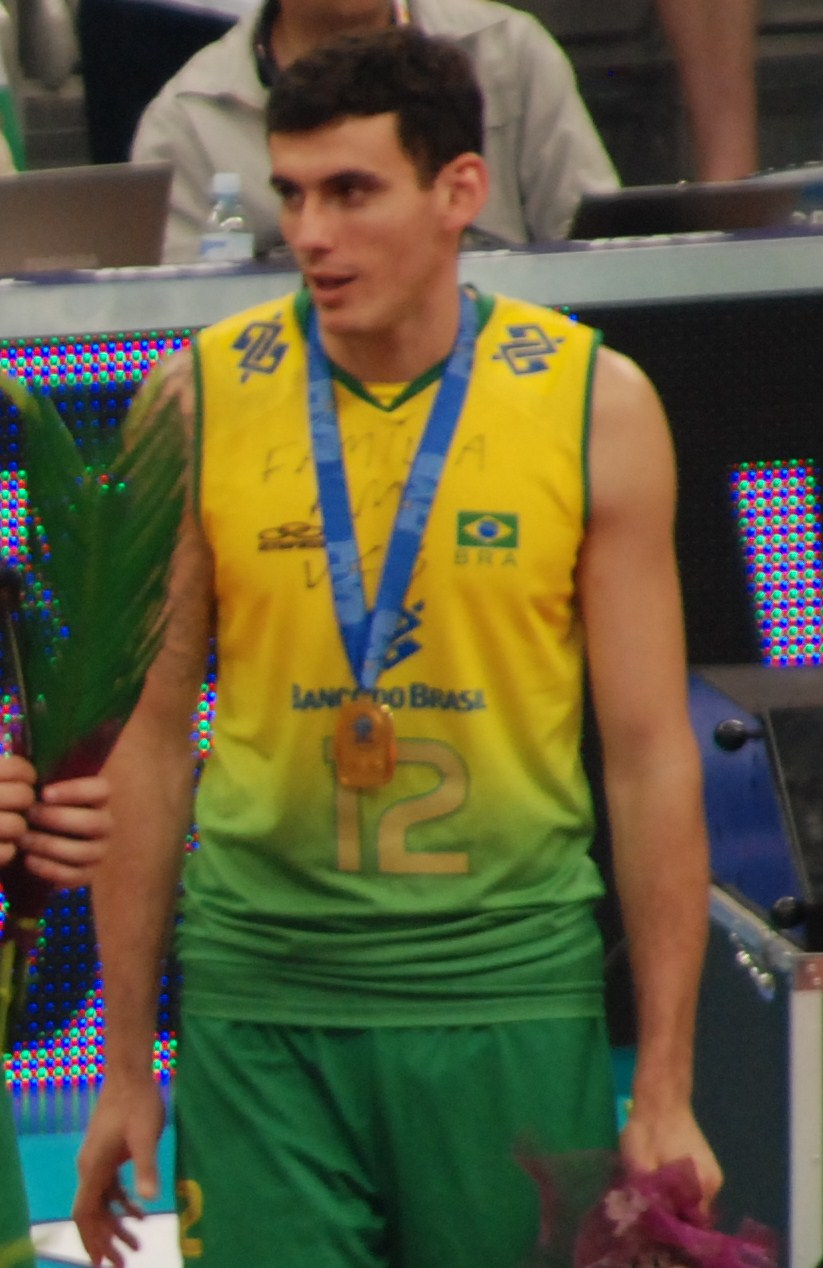

Personal information
- Full name: João Paulo de Figueiredo Tavares
- Born: 30 March 1983 (age 43); Três Pontas, Minas Gerais, Brazil
- Height: 205 cm (6 ft 9 in)
- Weight: 95 kg (209 lb)
- Spike: 332 cm (131 in)
- Block: 327 cm (129 in)

Volleyball information
- Position: Outside spiker
- Number: 12

Career
Years	Teams
2010	CIMED SKY

National team
2009–2010	Brazil
Honours
Men's volleyball
Representing Brazil
World Championship
Gold medal – first place	2010 Italy	Team
World Grand Champions Cup
Gold medal – first place	2009 Japan	Team
World League
Gold medal – first place	2009 Belgrade
Gold medal – first place	2010 Córdoba
South American Championship
Gold medal – first place	2009 Colombia

João Paulo de Figueiredo Tavares (born 30 March 1983) is a Brazilian male volleyball player. He was part of the Brazil men's national volleyball team at the 2010 FIVB Volleyball Men's World Championship in Italy. He played for CIMED SKY.

== Clubs ==
- CIMED SKY (2010)
