= Théo Lopes =

Brazilian volleyball player (born 1983)

Personal information
- Full name: Théo Fabrício Nery Lopes
- Born: 31 August 1983 (age 43) Brasília, Distrito Federal, Brazil
- Height: 199 cm (6 ft 6 in)
- Weight: 80 kg (176 lb)
- Spike: 345 cm (136 in)
- Block: 324 cm (128 in)

Volleyball information
- Position: Opposite hitter
- Current club: Benfica
- Number: 11

Career
- Years: Team
- 2008–2009: Cimed/Florianópolis
- 2000–2010: Suntory Sunbirds
- 2012–2013: Associação Desportiva RJX
- 2013–2014: UPCN Vóley Club
- 2014–2017: SESI-São Paulo
- 2017–2018: Bolívar
- 2018–: S.L. Benfica

National team
- Years: Team
- 2009–2014: Brazil
Honours
Men's volleyball
Representing Brazil
World Championship
Gold medal – first place	2010 Italy	Team
World Cup
Bronze medal – third place	2011 Japan	Team
World Grand Champions Cup
Gold medal – first place	2009 Japan	Team
World League
Gold medal – first place	2010 Córdoba	Team
Silver medal – second place	2011 Gdańsk	Team
Silver medal – second place	2014 Florence	Team
South American Championship
Gold medal – first place	2011 Cuiabá	Team

Théo Fabrício Nery Lopes (born 31 August 1983) is a Brazilian male volleyball player who plays for Portuguese club S.L. Benfica. He was part of the Brazil national team who won the 2010 FIVB World Championship in Italy.

== Honours ==
Benfica

- Portuguese First Division: 2018–19
- Portuguese Cup: 2018–19
- Portuguese Super Cup: 2018, 2019
