= Sidão (volleyball) =

Brazilian volleyball player (born 1982)

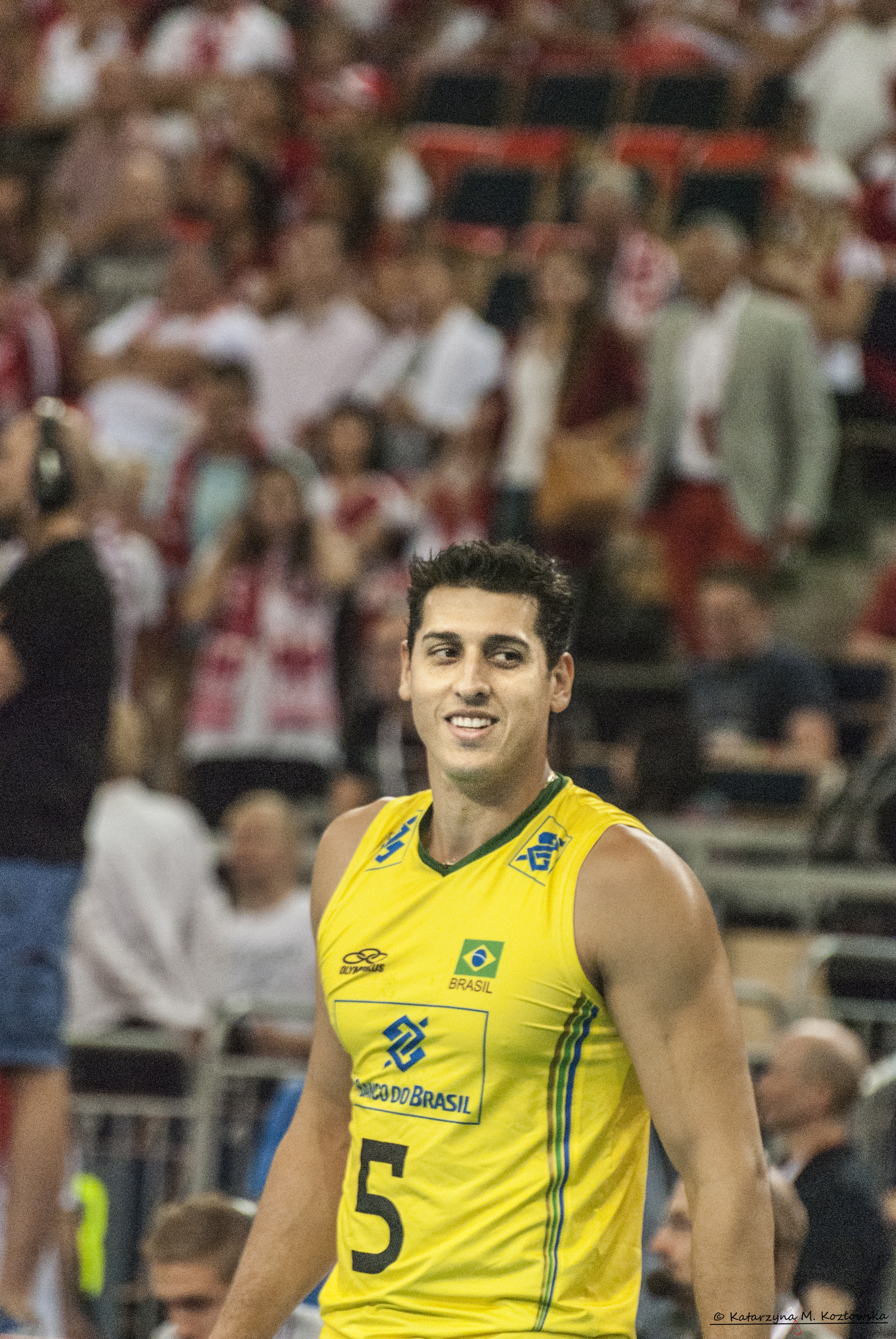

Personal information
- Full name: Sidnei Dos Santos Junior
- Nickname: Sidão
- Born: July 9, 1982 (age 44); São Caetano do Sul, Brazil
- Height: 2.03 m (6 ft 8 in)
- Weight: 90 kg (198 lb)
- Spike: 348 cm (137 in)
- Block: 335 cm (132 in)

Volleyball information
- Position: Middle blocker
- Current team: SESI São Paulo
- Number: 5

Career
| Years | Teams |
|---|---|
| 1997–2002 | EC Banespa |
| 2002–2004 | Super Vôlei Santo André |
| 2004–2005 | Ulbra/Canoas |
| 2005–2006 | Cimed Florianópolis |
| 2006–2009 | Modena Volley |
| 2009–2014 | SESI São Paulo |
| 2014–2015 | Funvic Taubaté |
| 2015–2017 | SESI São Paulo |
| 2017–2019 | Corinthians/Guarulhos |
| 2019– | SESI São Paulo |

National team
| 2006–2016 | Brazil |
Honours
Men's volleyball
Representing Brazil
| Event | 1st | 2nd | 3rd |
|---|---|---|---|
| Olympic Games | 0 | 1 | 0 |
| World Championship | 1 | 1 | 0 |
| World Cup | 0 | 0 | 1 |
| World Grand Champions Cup | 2 | 0 | 0 |
| World League | 4 | 2 | 0 |
| South American Championship | 3 | 0 | 0 |
| Total | 10 | 4 | 1 |
Olympic Games
| Silver medal – second place | 2012 London | Team |
World Championship
| Gold medal – first place | 2010 Italy | Team |
| Silver medal – second place | 2014 Poland | Team |
World Cup
| Bronze medal – third place | 2011 Japan | Team |
World Grand Champions Cup
| Gold medal – first place | 2009 Japan | Team |
| Gold medal – first place | 2013 Japan | Team |
World League
| Gold medal – first place | 2006 Moscow | |
| Gold medal – first place | 2007 Katowice | |
| Gold medal – first place | 2009 Belgrade | |
| Gold medal – first place | 2010 Córdoba | |
| Silver medal – second place | 2011 Gdańsk | |
| Silver medal – second place | 2014 Florence | |
South American Championship
| Gold medal – first place | 2009 Bogotá | |
| Gold medal – first place | 2011 Cuiabá | |
| Gold medal – first place | 2013 Cabo Frio | |
- Last updated: July 21, 2014

Sidnei Dos Santos Jr. (born 1982), commonly known as Sidão, is a Brazilian former professional volleyball player who played for SESI São Paulo and was a member of the Brazilian national team. He competed at the 2012 Summer Olympics, where Brazil lost in the final. He also played with the national team at the 2010 FIVB Volleyball Men's World Championship in Italy.

== Clubs ==
- Taubaté Funvic (2010)

== Sporting achievements ==
=== Clubs ===
- 2005/2006 Brazilian Superliga, with Cimed Florianópolis
- 2010/2011 Brazilian Superliga, with SESI São Paulo

==== International trophies ====
- 2007/2008 CEV Challenge Cup – with Modena Volley
- 2011 South American Club Championship – with SESI São Paulo

=== Individuals ===
- 2005–06 Brazilian Superliga – Best Server
- 2010–11 Brazilian Superliga – Best Server
- 2013 South American Championship – Best Middle Blocker
- 2013 South American Championship – Most Valuable Player
