= Thiago Soares Alves =

Brazilian volleyball player (born 1986)

Thiago Alves
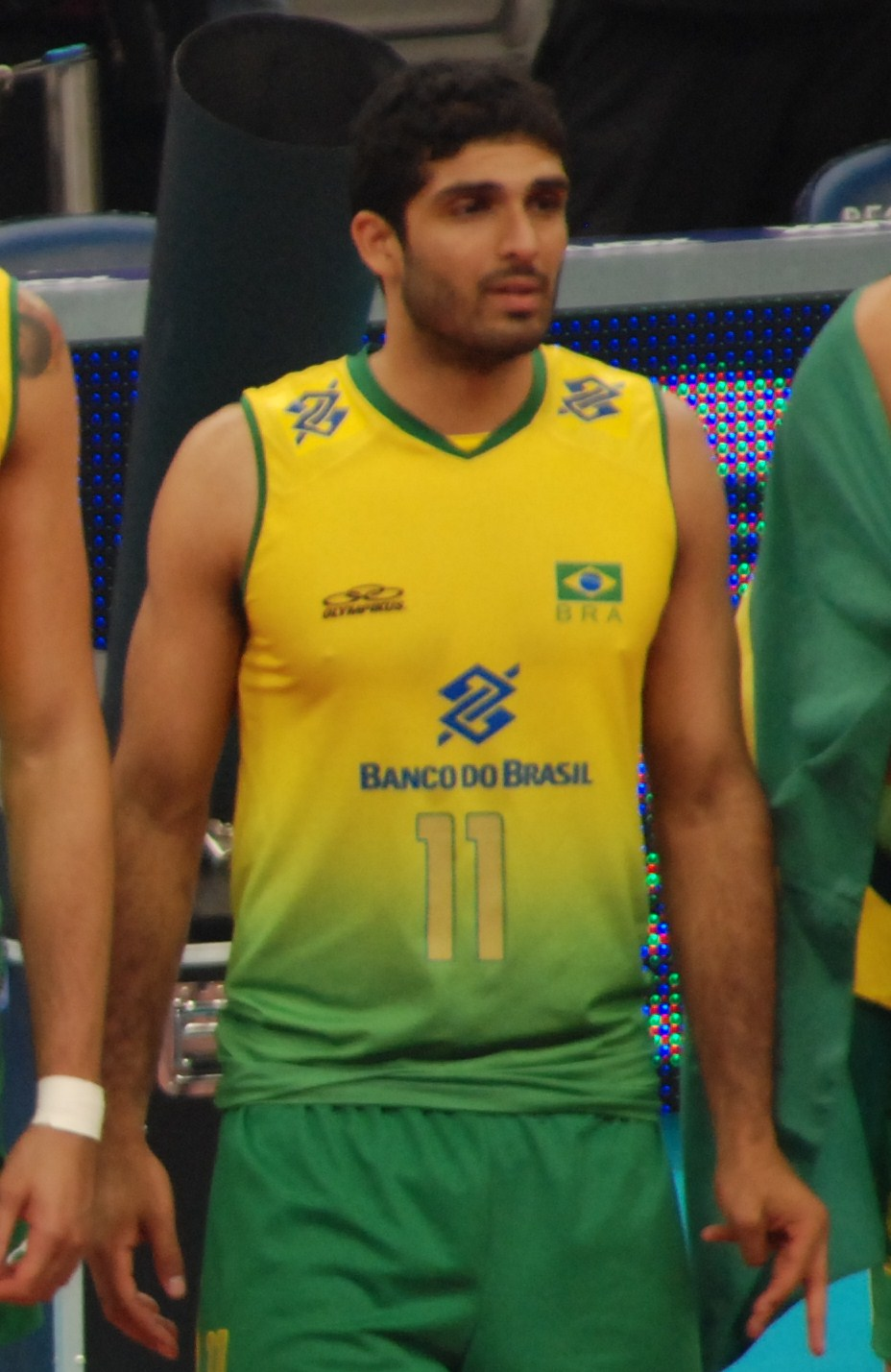

Personal information
- Full name: Thiago Soares Alves
- Born: July 26, 1986 (age 40) Porto Alegre, Rio Grande do Sul, Brazil
- Height: 1.96 m (6 ft 5 in)

Volleyball information
- Position: Outside spiker
- Current club: Montes Claros Vôlei
- Number: 17

Career
- Years: Team
- 2000–2003: (Brazil) Grêmio Náutico União
- 2003–2004: (Brazil) Bento Gonçalves
- 2004–2005: (Brazil) On Line Novo Hamburgo
- 2006–2007: (Brazil) Unisul/Florianópolis
- 2007–2009: (Brazil) Cimed/Florianópolis
- 2009–2010: (Brazil) Cimed Malwee
- 2010–2011: (Brazil) SESI-SP
- 2011–2012: (Japan) Panasonic Panthers
- 2012–2013: (Brazil) RJX
- 2013–2014: (Turkey) Fenerbahçe Grundig
- 2014–2015: (Japan) Panasonic Panthers
- 2015–2016: (Brazil) SESI-SP
- 2016–2017: (Italy) Vibo Valentia
- 2017–2018: (Brazil) Maringá Vôlei
- 2018–2019: (Brazil) Apan Vôlei/Blumenau
- 2019–: (Brazil) Montes Claros Vôlei

National team
- Years: Team
- 2007–2013: Brazil
Honours
Men's volleyball
Representing Brazil
Olympic Games
Silver medal – second place	2012 London	Team
World Grand Champions Cup
Gold medal – first place	2009 Japan	Team
Gold medal – first place	2013 Japan	Team
World League
Gold medal – first place	2007 Katowice	Team
Gold medal – first place	2009 Belgrade	Team
Gold medal – first place	2010 Córdoba	Team
Silver medal – second place	2011 Gdansk
Silver medal – second place	2013 Mar del Plata	Team
Pan American Games
Gold medal – first place	2011 Guadalajara	Team
South American Championship
Gold medal – first place	2007 Chile
Gold medal – first place	2009 Colombia
Gold medal – first place	2011 Brazil

Thiago Soares Alves (born July 26, 1986) is a Brazilian volleyball player, who is a wing spiker and has competed for Fenerbahçe Grundig and the national team. He competed at the 2012 Summer Olympics, where Brazil reached the final, winning the silver medal.

== Clubs ==
Club	Country	From	To
Grêmio Náutico União	Brazil	2000	2003
Bento Gonçalves	Brazil	2003	2004
On Line/ Herval/Novo Hamburgo	Brazil	2004	2005
Unisul/Florianópolis	Brazil	2006	2007
Cimed Brasil Telecom/Florianópolis	Brazil	2007	2009
Cimed Malwee	Brazil	2009	2010
SESI-SP	Brazil	2010	2011
Panasonic Panthers	Japan	2011	2012
RJX	Brazil	2012	2013
Fenerbahçe Grundig	Turkey	2013	2014
Panasonic Panthers	Japan	2014	2015
SESI-SP	Brazil	2015	present
