= 2009 FIVB Volleyball Men's World Grand Champions Cup =

2009 Men's World Grand Champions Cup

Tournament details
- Host country: Japan
- Dates: 18–23 November
- Teams: 6
- Venues: 2 (in 2 host cities)

Final positions
- Champions: Brazil (3rd title)

Tournament awards
- MVP: (Cuba) Robertlandy Simón

The 2009 FIVB Volleyball Men's World Grand Champions Cup was held in Osaka and Nagoya, Japan from 18 to 23 November 2009.

== Qualification ==
Team	Qualified as
Japan	Hosts and 2009 Asian Champions
Iran	2009 Asian Runners-up
Poland	2009 European Champions
Cuba	2009 NORCECA Champions
Brazil	2009 South American Champions
Egypt	Wild Card

== Competition formula ==
The competition formula of the 2009 Men's World Grand Champions Cup was the single Round-Robin system. Each team plays once against each of the 5 remaining teams. Points were accumulated during the whole tournament, and the final standing was determined by the total points gained.

== Venues ==
- Osaka Municipal Central Gymnasium, Osaka, Japan
- Nippon Gaishi Hall, Nagoya, Japan

== Results ==
- All times are Japan Standard Time (UTC+09:00).

Pos	Team	Pld	W	L	Pts	SW	SL	SR	SPW	SPL	SPR
1	Brazil	5	5	0	10	15	3	5.000	436	360	1.211
2	Cuba	5	4	1	9	14	7	2.000	474	420	1.129
3	Japan	5	3	2	8	9	11	0.818	430	437	0.984
4	Poland	5	2	3	7	9	10	0.900	402	433	0.928
5	Iran	5	1	4	6	8	14	0.571	472	491	0.961
6	Egypt	5	0	5	5	5	15	0.333	388	461	0.842

=== Osaka round ===
Date	Time		Score		Set 1	Set 2	Set 3	Set 4	Set 5	Total	Report
18 Nov	13:30	Egypt	2–3	Iran	25–21	20–25	21–25	25–17	10–15	101–103	P2 P3
18 Nov	15:30	Cuba	2–3	Brazil	22–25	26–24	18–25	25–23	10–15	101–112	P2 P3
18 Nov	19:00	Japan	3–2	Poland	22–25	25–15	21–25	25–21	15–10	108–96	P2 P3
19 Nov	13:30	Iran	1–3	Brazil	22–25	18–25	25–23	19–25		84–98	P2 P3
19 Nov	15:30	Poland	1–3	Cuba	25–22	18–25	18–25	22–25		83–97	P2 P3
19 Nov	19:00	Egypt	1–3	Japan	15–25	25–22	21–25	17–25		78–97	P2 P3

=== Nagoya round ===
Date	Time		Score		Set 1	Set 2	Set 3	Set 4	Set 5	Total	Report
21 Nov	12:30	Brazil	3–0	Poland	25–17	25–17	25–18			75–52	P2 P3
21 Nov	14:30	Cuba	3–2	Egypt	25–17	23–25	25–14	23–25	15–7	111–88	P2 P3
21 Nov	18:00	Japan	3–2	Iran	27–25	18–25	25–23	20–25	16–14	106–112	P2 P3
22 Nov	12:30	Egypt	0–3	Brazil	21–25	22–25	22–25			65–75	P2 P3
22 Nov	14:30	Iran	1–3	Poland	23–25	25–18	26–28	23–25		97–96	P2 P3
22 Nov	18:00	Japan	0–3	Cuba	19–25	20–25	22–25			61–75	P2 P3
23 Nov	13:30	Cuba	3–1	Iran	25–14	25–22	15–25	25–15		90–76	P2 P3
23 Nov	15:30	Poland	3–0	Egypt	25–19	25–18	25–19			75–56	P2 P3
23 Nov	19:00	Brazil	3–0	Japan	25–12	26–24	25–22			76–58	P2 P3

== Final standing ==
Rank	Team
1st place, gold medalist(s)	Brazil
2nd place, silver medalist(s)	Cuba
3rd place, bronze medalist(s)	Japan
4	Poland
5	Iran
6	Egypt

2009 Men's World Grand Champions Cup champions

Brazil
Third title

Team Roster

Bruno, Sidão, Vissotto, Giba, Murilo, Théo, Sérgio, Thiago, João Paulo, Rodrigão, Lucas, Marlon

Head Coach: Bernardinho

== Awards ==
- MVP: (Cuba) Robertlandy Simón
- Best scorer: (Japan) Kunihiro Shimizu
- Best spiker: (Japan) Tatsuya Fukuzawa
- Best blocker: (Cuba) Robertlandy Simón
- Best server: (Cuba) Robertlandy Simón
- Best setter: (Brazil) Bruno Rezende
- Best libero: (Brazil) Sérgio Santos
