= Japan national volleyball team =

Japan national volleyball team may refer to:

- Japan men's national volleyball team
- Japan women's national volleyball team
