= Tatsuya Fukuzawa =

Japanese volleyball player (born 1986)

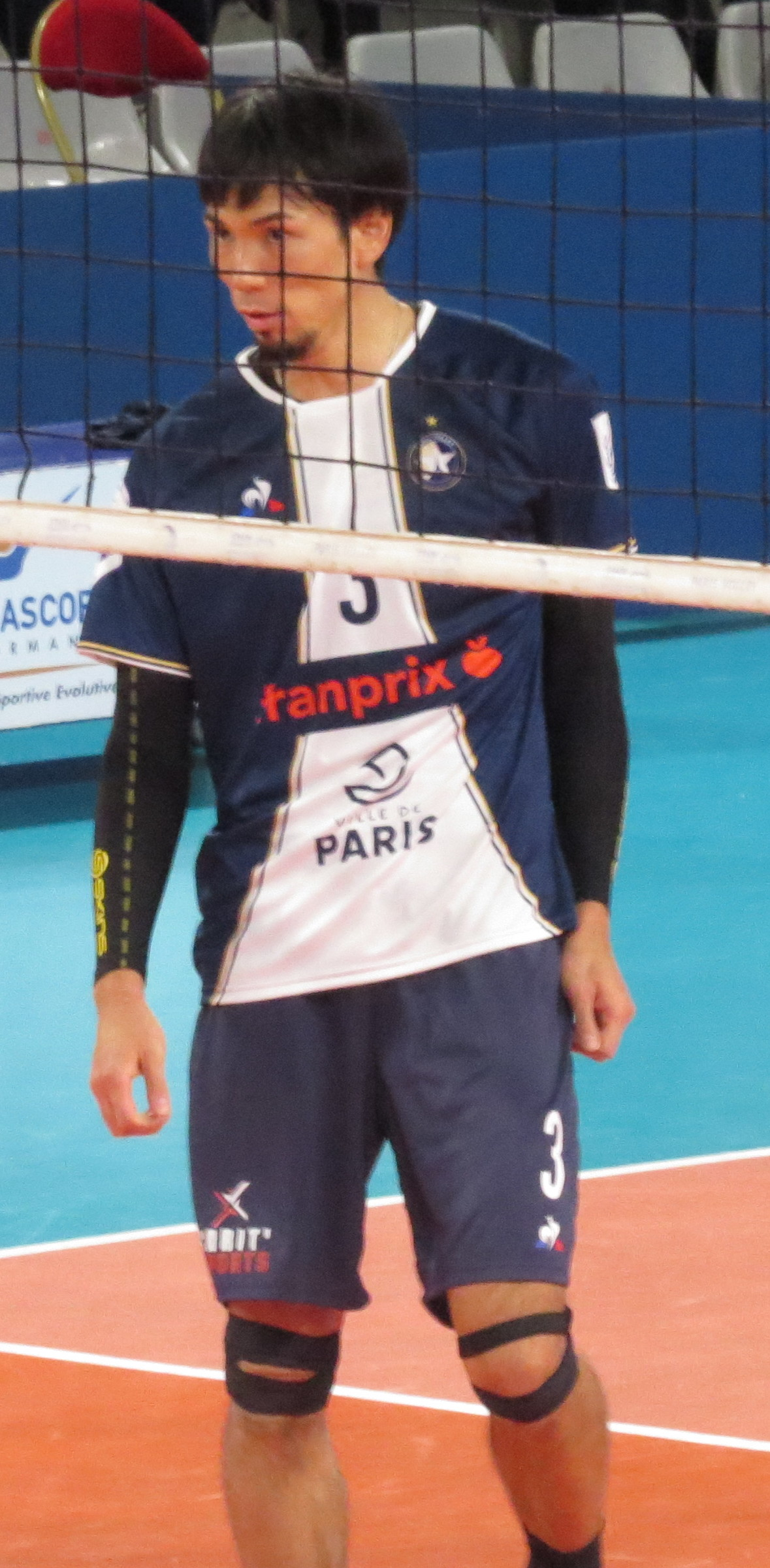

Personal information
- Full name: Tatsuya Fukuzawa
- Nickname: Tatsuya
- Born: July 1, 1986 (age 40); Kyoto, Japan
- Height: 1.89 m (6 ft 2 in)
- Weight: 88 kg (194 lb)
- Spike: 355 cm (140 in)
- Block: 330 cm (130 in)

Volleyball information
- Position: Wing spiker/Outside hitter
- Current club: (Japan) Panasonic Panthers
- Number: 15 (club); 5 (national)

National team
| 2005–2021 | Japan |
Medal record
Men's volleyball
Representing Japan
World Grand Champions Cup
| Bronze medal – third place | Osaka/Nagoya 2009 | Team |
Asian Games
| Gold medal – first place | 2010 Guangzhou | Team |
Asian Championship
| Gold medal – first place | 2009 Manila | Team |
| Gold medal – first place | 2015 Tehran | Team |
| Gold medal – first place | 2017 Gresik | Team |
| Bronze medal – third place | 2019 Tehran | Team |

Tatsuya Fukuzawa (福澤 達哉 Fukuzawa Tatsuya, born July 1, 1986) is a retired Japanese volleyball player who played for Japan men's national volleyball team. He announced his retirement on July 14, 2021 and competed in the retirement match with Panasonic Panthers teammates on August 14, 2021.

== Personal life ==
He is married and has four daughters.

== Clubs ==
- (Japan) Rakunan High School
- (Japan) Chuo University (2004–2008)
- (Japan) Panasonic Panthers (2009–2015)
- (Brazil) Copel Telecom (2015–2016)
- (Japan) Panasonic Panthers (2016-2019)
- (France) Paris Volley (2019–2021) (loaned)
- (Japan) Panasonic Panthers (2021-2022)

== Awards ==
=== Individuals ===
- 2008-09 V.Premier League – "Rookie of the Year"
- 2009: 58th Kurowashi Tournament – "Young Eagle Award (Rookie), Best 6"
- 2009: Asian Championship "Most Valuable Player Award"
- 2009: World Grand Champions Cup "Best Spiker"
- 2009-10 V.Premier League – "Best 6"
- 2010: 59th Kurowashi Tournament – "Best 6"
- 2011-12 V.Premier League – "Most Valuable Player Award", "Best 6"
- 2012-13 V.Premier League – "Best 6"
- 2013: 62nd Kurowashi Tournament – "Best 6"
- 2014: 63rd Kurowashi Tournament – "Best 6"

=== Team ===
- 2009 Kurowashiki All Japan Volleyball Championship - Champion, with Panasonic Panthers.
- 2009-2010 V.Premier League - Champion, with Panasonic Panthers.
- 2010 Asian Club Championship – 3rd place, with Panasonic Panthers.
- 2010 Kurowashiki All Japan Volleyball Championship - Champion, with Panasonic Panthers.
- 2011-2012 V.Premier League - Champion, with Panasonic Panthers.
- 2012 Kurowashiki All Japan Volleyball Championship - Champion, with Panasonic Panthers.
- 2012-2013 V.Premier League - Runner-Up, with Panasonic Panthers.
- 2013 Kurowashiki All Japan Volleyball Championship - Runner-Up, with Panasonic Panthers.
- 2013-2014 V.Premier League - Champion, with Panasonic Panthers.
- 2014 Kurowashiki All Japan Volleyball Championship - Champion, with Panasonic Panthers.

== National team ==
=== Senior team ===
- 2005: World League – 10th place
- 2008: World League – 6th place
- 2008: Summer Olympics – 11th place
- 2009: World League – 15th place
- 2009: Asian Championship – Gold Medal
- 2009: World Grand Champions Cup – Bronze Medal
- 2010: Asian Games – Gold Medal
- 2011: World League – 15th place
- 2011: World Cup – 10th place
- 2012: World League – 15th place
- 2013: World League – 18th place
- 2013: World Grand Champions Cup – 6th place
- 2013: Asian Championship – 4th place
