= 2009 FIVB Volleyball World League =

International sport competition

2009 World League
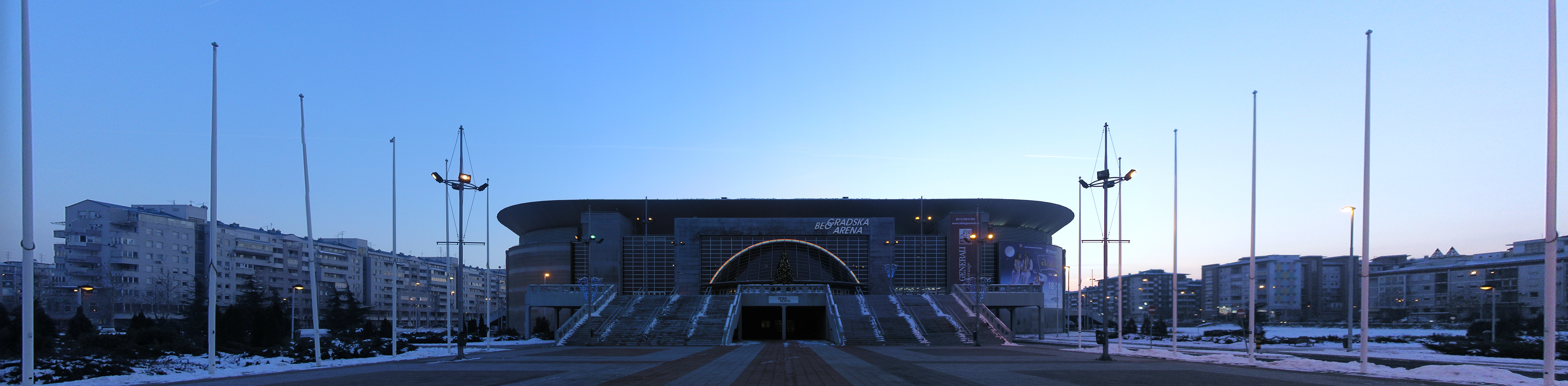
- The Belgrade Arena hosted the final round

Tournament details
- Host country: Serbia (Final)
- Dates: 12 June – 26 July
- Teams: 16
- Venues: 44 (in 42 host cities)

Final positions
- Champions: Brazil (8th title)

Tournament awards
- MVP: (Brazil) Sérgio Santos

The 2009 FIVB Volleyball World League was the 20th edition of the annual men's international volleyball tournament, played by 16 countries from 12 June to 26 July 2009. The Final Round was held in Belgrade, Serbia.

== Pools composition ==
Pool A	Pool B	Pool C	Pool D
United States; Italy; China; Netherlands	Serbia; France; South Korea; Argentina	Russia; Bulgaria; Japan; Cuba	Brazil; Poland; Finland; Venezuela

== Pool standing procedure ==
1. Match points
2. Number of matches won
3. Points ratio
4. Sets ratio
5. Result of the last match between the tied teams

Match won 3–0 or 3–1: 3 match points for the winner, 0 match points for the loser
Match won 3–2: 2 match points for the winner, 1 match point for the loser

== Intercontinental round ==
- All times are local.
- The Final Round hosts Serbia, the winners of each pool and the best second among Pool A, C and D will qualify for the Final Round. If Serbia are ranked first in Pool B, the team ranked second of Pool B will qualify for the Final Round.

=== Pool A ===
Pos	Team	Pld	W	L	Pts	SPW	SPL	SPR	SW	SL	SR	Qualification
1	United States	12	9	3	27	1076	989	1.088	30	15	2.000	Final round
2	Italy	12	8	4	22	1030	951	1.083	27	17	1.588	
3	Netherlands	12	4	8	13	916	993	0.922	16	26	0.615	
4	China	12	3	9	10	923	1012	0.912	14	29	0.483	

==== Week 1 ====
Date	Time		Score		Set 1	Set 2	Set 3	Set 4	Set 5	Total	Report
12 Jun	20:37	Italy	3–0	China	25–16	25–12	25–16			75–44	P2 P3
13 Jun	17:07	Netherlands	3–0	United States	25–22	25–19	26–24			76–65	P2 P3
13 Jun	20:30	Italy	0–3	China	21–25	23–25	32–34			76–84	P2 P3
14 Jun	15:07	Netherlands	2–3	United States	16–25	32–30	17–25	25–20	6–15	96–115	P2 P3

==== Week 2 ====
Date	Time		Score		Set 1	Set 2	Set 3	Set 4	Set 5	Total	Report
19 Jun	19:37	Italy	1–3	United States	21–25	28–30	25–21	21–25		95–101	P2 P3
20 Jun	17:07	Netherlands	3–0	China	26–24	28–26	25–20			79–70	P2 P3
21 Jun	15:00	Netherlands	3–0	China	25–18	25–20	25–15			75–53	P2 P3
21 Jun	18:07	Italy	1–3	United States	19–25	25–18	22–25	20–25		86–93	P2 P3

==== Week 3 ====
Date	Time		Score		Set 1	Set 2	Set 3	Set 4	Set 5	Total	Report
26 Jun	19:07	United States	3–0	China	25–20	25–19	25–21			75–60	P2 P3
27 Jun	17:00	Netherlands	2–3	Italy	25–21	25–23	19–25	15–25	9–15	93–109	P2 P3
27 Jun	19:07	United States	3–0	China	25–20	25–23	25–22			75–65	P2 P3
28 Jun	15:00	Netherlands	0–3	Italy	23–25	15–25	20–25			58–75	P2 P3

==== Week 4 ====
Date	Time		Score		Set 1	Set 2	Set 3	Set 4	Set 5	Total	Report
3 Jul	20:37	Italy	3–0	Netherlands	25–19	25–19	25–22			75–60	P2 P3
4 Jul	19:25	China	3–2	United States	25–19	27–29	18–25	26–24	15–12	111–109	P2 P3
5 Jul	19:25	China	1–3	United States	18–25	25–20	21–25	12–25		76–95	P2 P3
5 Jul	20:37	Italy	3–0	Netherlands	25–23	25–20	25–23			75–66	P2 P3

==== Week 5 ====
Date	Time		Score		Set 1	Set 2	Set 3	Set 4	Set 5	Total	Report
10 Jul	19:07	United States	1–3	Italy	25–20	20–25	22–25	24–26		91–96	P2 P3
11 Jul	16:00	China	2–3	Netherlands	18–25	25–19	27–29	25–11	22–24	117–108	P2 P3
11 Jul	19:07	United States	3–1	Italy	25–19	18–25	25–22	25–21		93–87	P2 P3
12 Jul	13:30	China	3–0	Netherlands	25–21	25–20	25–23			75–64	P2 P3

==== Week 6 ====
Date	Time		Score		Set 1	Set 2	Set 3	Set 4	Set 5	Total	Report
17 Jul	19:22	China	0–3	Italy	23–25	18–25	17–25			58–75	P2 P3
17 Jul	19:07	United States	3–0	Netherlands	25–21	32–30	31–29			88–80	P2 P3
18 Jul	19:02	China	2–3	Italy	26–28	25–21	25–17	21–25	13–15	110–106	P2 P3
18 Jul	19:07	United States	3–0	Netherlands	25–19	25–18	26–24			76–61	P2 P3

=== Pool B ===
Pos	Team	Pld	W	L	Pts	SPW	SPL	SPR	SW	SL	SR	Qualification
1	Serbia	12	8	4	24	1079	1028	1.050	27	20	1.350	Hosts for the final round
2	Argentina	12	7	5	21	1193	1186	1.006	29	25	1.160	Final round
3	France	12	6	6	18	1117	1125	0.993	26	24	1.083	
4	South Korea	12	3	9	9	1101	1151	0.957	18	31	0.581	

==== Week 1 ====
Date	Time		Score		Set 1	Set 2	Set 3	Set 4	Set 5	Total	Report
12 Jun	20:37	Serbia	0–3	France	22–25	17–25	27–29			66–79	P2 P3
13 Jun	14:09	South Korea	3–2	Argentina	20–25	25–22	34–36	25–16	15–13	119–112	P2 P3
14 Jun	14:03	South Korea	2–3	Argentina	25–21	21–25	25–19	20–25	12–15	103–105	P2 P3
14 Jun	20:37	Serbia	3–1	France	25–19	25–22	19–25	25–23		94–89	P2 P3

==== Week 2 ====
Date	Time		Score		Set 1	Set 2	Set 3	Set 4	Set 5	Total	Report
19 Jun	20:37	France	2–3	Argentina	19–25	25–19	25–22	20–25	9–15	98–106	P2 P3
20 Jun	14:08	South Korea	1–3	Serbia	25–14	27–29	18–25	18–25		88–93	P2 P3
21 Jun	14:10	South Korea	3–0	Serbia	25–22	28–26	25–22			78–70	P2 P3
21 Jun	19:07	France	3–2	Argentina	25–21	26–24	19–25	22–25	15–9	107–104	P2 P3

==== Week 3 ====
Date	Time		Score		Set 1	Set 2	Set 3	Set 4	Set 5	Total	Report
26 Jun	20:37	Serbia	2–3	Argentina	25–20	22–25	25–18	23–25	13–15	108–103	P2 P3
26 Jun	20:37	France	3–1	South Korea	25–18	25–19	16–25	25–21		91–83	P2 P3
28 Jun	19:37	France	3–2	South Korea	25–23	24–26	34–32	20–25	15–10	118–116	P2 P3
28 Jun	20:37	Serbia	3–0	Argentina	25–15	27–25	25–19			77–59	P2 P3

==== Week 4 ====
Date	Time		Score		Set 1	Set 2	Set 3	Set 4	Set 5	Total	Report
3 Jul	20:37	France	1–3	Serbia	22–25	21–25	25–15	19–25		87–90	P2 P3
4 Jul	18:07	Argentina	2–3	South Korea	30–32	20–25	25–21	25–22	10–15	110–115	P2 P3
5 Jul	19:07	France	1–3	Serbia	16–25	14–25	25–21	20–25		75–96	P2 P3
5 Jul	18:07	Argentina	3–0	South Korea	31–29	25–20	25–23			81–72	P2 P3

==== Week 5 ====
Date	Time		Score		Set 1	Set 2	Set 3	Set 4	Set 5	Total	Report
10 Jul	21:06	Argentina	3–1	Serbia	25–22	27–25	21–25	25–18		98–90	P2 P3
11 Jul	14:00	South Korea	0–3	France	14–25	24–26	20–25			58–76	P2 P3
11 Jul	21:07	Argentina	2–3	Serbia	25–16	21–25	25–21	20–25	10–15	101–102	P2 P3
12 Jul	14:03	South Korea	1–3	France	21–25	25–21	29–31	23–25		98–102	P2 P3

==== Week 6 ====
Date	Time		Score		Set 1	Set 2	Set 3	Set 4	Set 5	Total	Report
16 Jul	21:07	Argentina	3–1	France	28–26	25–21	21–25	25–18		99–90	P2 P3
17 Jul	20:37	Serbia	3–1	South Korea	20–25	25–19	25–20	25–22		95–86	P2 P3
17 Jul	21:07	Argentina	3–2	France	32–30	22–25	21–25	25–18	15–7	115–105	P2 P3
18 Jul	20:37	Serbia	3–1	South Korea	23–25	25–17	25–21	25–22		98–85	P2 P3

=== Pool C ===
Pos	Team	Pld	W	L	Pts	SPW	SPL	SPR	SW	SL	SR	Qualification
1	Cuba	12	8	4	26	1099	1001	1.098	30	17	1.765	Final round
2	Russia	12	8	4	23	1046	988	1.059	28	17	1.647	Final round
3	Bulgaria	12	5	7	15	1048	1084	0.967	20	26	0.769	
4	Japan	12	3	9	8	943	1063	0.887	13	31	0.419	

==== Week 1 ====
Date	Time		Score		Set 1	Set 2	Set 3	Set 4	Set 5	Total	Report
12 Jun	20:40	Cuba	3–1	Bulgaria	24–26	29–27	25–18	25–22		103–93	P2 P3
13 Jun	14:07	Japan	0–3	Russia	22–25	23–25	16–25			61–75	P2 P3
13 Jun	20:40	Cuba	3–1	Bulgaria	25–19	23–25	25–21	25–20		98–85	P2 P3
14 Jun	14:07	Japan	1–3	Russia	22–25	22–25	25–22	12–25		81–97	P2 P3

==== Week 2 ====
Date	Time		Score		Set 1	Set 2	Set 3	Set 4	Set 5	Total	Report
19 Jun	20:47	Cuba	3–2	Russia	25–18	24–26	22–25	25–23	15–11	111–103	P2 P3
20 Jun	17:37	Bulgaria	3–1	Japan	26–24	19–25	25–21	25–22		95–92	P2 P3
20 Jun	20:47	Cuba	2–3	Russia	21–25	25–19	25–18	20–25	13–15	104–102	P2 P3
21 Jun	17:37	Bulgaria	1–3	Japan	16–25	25–14	24–26	21–25		86–90	P2 P3

==== Week 3 ====
Date	Time		Score		Set 1	Set 2	Set 3	Set 4	Set 5	Total	Report
27 Jun	14:07	Japan	0–3	Cuba	22–25	19–25	25–27			66–77	P2 P3
27 Jun	18:07	Russia	1–3	Bulgaria	29–31	25–16	23–25	20–25		97–97	P2 P3
28 Jun	14:07	Japan	0–3	Cuba	22–25	21–25	18–25			61–75	P2 P3
28 Jun	18:07	Russia	3–0	Bulgaria	25–22	25–18	25–22			75–62	P2 P3

==== Week 4 ====
Date	Time		Score		Set 1	Set 2	Set 3	Set 4	Set 5	Total	Report
4 Jul	15:07	Japan	1–3	Bulgaria	23–25	25–23	29–31	26–28		103–107	P2 P3
4 Jul	18:07	Russia	3–2	Cuba	25–14	24–26	19–25	25–23	25–23	118–111	P2 P3
5 Jul	14:07	Japan	3–2	Bulgaria	26–24	13–25	21–25	25–23	15–13	100–110	P2 P3
5 Jul	18:07	Russia	0–3	Cuba	19–25	17–25	21–25			57–75	P2 P3

==== Week 5 ====
Date	Time		Score		Set 1	Set 2	Set 3	Set 4	Set 5	Total	Report
10 Jul	18:07	Russia	3–0	Japan	25–19	25–12	25–22			75–53	P2 P3
11 Jul	18:07	Russia	1–3	Japan	23–25	23–25	25–22	21–25		92–97	P2 P3
11 Jul	17:37	Bulgaria	3–2	Cuba	13–25	23–25	25–23	26–24	15–10	102–107	P2 P3
12 Jul	17:37	Bulgaria	3–0	Cuba	25–22	25–21	25–21			75–64	P2 P3

==== Week 6 ====
Date	Time		Score		Set 1	Set 2	Set 3	Set 4	Set 5	Total	Report
17 Jul	17:37	Bulgaria	0–3	Russia	21–25	27–29	24–26			72–80	P2 P3
17 Jul	20:47	Cuba	3–0	Japan	25–19	25–13	25–21			75–53	P2 P3
18 Jul	17:37	Bulgaria	0–3	Russia	21–25	22–25	21–25			64–75	P2 P3
18 Jul	20:47	Cuba	3–1	Japan	25–17	27–25	22–25	25–19		99–86	P2 P3

=== Pool D ===
Pos	Team	Pld	W	L	Pts	SPW	SPL	SPR	SW	SL	SR	Qualification
1	Brazil	12	11	1	33	1008	809	1.246	35	6	5.833	Final round
2	Finland	12	7	5	21	1059	1066	0.993	25	22	1.136	
3	Poland	12	5	7	13	959	994	0.965	18	26	0.692	
4	Venezuela	12	1	11	5	876	1033	0.848	9	33	0.273	

==== Week 1 ====
Date	Time		Score		Set 1	Set 2	Set 3	Set 4	Set 5	Total	Report
12 Jun	19:00	Venezuela	3–0	Finland	27–25	25–21	25–22			77–68	P2 P3
13 Jun	10:07	Brazil	3–1	Poland	23–25	25–18	25–20	25–19		98–82	P2 P3
14 Jun	10:07	Brazil	3–0	Poland	25–20	25–20	25–15			75–55	P2 P3
14 Jun	14:00	Venezuela	1–3	Finland	23–25	22–25	25–22	23–25		93–97	P2 P3

==== Week 2 ====
Date	Time		Score		Set 1	Set 2	Set 3	Set 4	Set 5	Total	Report
19 Jun	10:07	Brazil	3–2	Finland	25–22	26–28	25–16	23–25	15–9	114–100	P2 P3
19 Jun	19:07	Venezuela	2–3	Poland	25–21	19–25	25–20	25–27	11–15	105–108	P2 P3
20 Jun	10:07	Brazil	3–0	Finland	25–17	25–19	25–20			75–56	P2 P3
21 Jun	14:07	Venezuela	0–3	Poland	21–25	11–25	18–25			50–75	P2 P3

==== Week 3 ====
Date	Time		Score		Set 1	Set 2	Set 3	Set 4	Set 5	Total	Report
26 Jun	18:37	Finland	3–2	Venezuela	19–25	26–24	24–26	25–13	27–25	121–113	P2 P3
27 Jun	16:37	Poland	0–3	Brazil	23–25	22–25	10–25			55–75	P2 P3
27 Jun	18:37	Finland	3–0	Venezuela	25–21	25–23	25–19			75–63	P2 P3
28 Jun	16:37	Poland	0–3	Brazil	19–25	21–25	20–25			60–75	P2 P3

==== Week 4 ====
Date	Time		Score		Set 1	Set 2	Set 3	Set 4	Set 5	Total	Report
3 Jul	18:37	Finland	0–3	Brazil	19–25	15–25	23–25			57–75	P2 P3
3 Jul	20:07	Poland	3–0	Venezuela	25–15	25–22	25–20			75–57	P2 P3
4 Jul	18:37	Finland	3–2	Brazil	22–25	23–25	25–22	25–22	17–15	112–109	P2 P3
4 Jul	20:07	Poland	3–1	Venezuela	27–29	25–14	25–21	25–22		102–86	P2 P3

==== Week 5 ====
Date	Time		Score		Set 1	Set 2	Set 3	Set 4	Set 5	Total	Report
10 Jul	18:37	Finland	3–1	Poland	25–21	25–18	22–25	28–26		100–90	P2 P3
10 Jul	19:07	Venezuela	0–3	Brazil	15–25	12–25	17–25			44–75	P2 P3
11 Jul	18:37	Finland	3–0	Poland	25–18	25–22	25–22			75–62	P2 P3
12 Jul	14:00	Venezuela	0–3	Brazil	23–25	32–34	19–25			74–84	P2 P3

==== Week 6 ====
Date	Time		Score		Set 1	Set 2	Set 3	Set 4	Set 5	Total	Report
15 Jul	20:07	Poland	1–3	Finland	16–25	25–21	20–25	23–25		84–96	P2 P3
16 Jul	20:07	Poland	3–2	Finland	29–27	20–25	25–16	22–25	15–9	111–102	P2 P3
18 Jul	10:07	Brazil	3–0	Venezuela	28–26	25–18	25–13			78–57	P2 P3
19 Jul	10:07	Brazil	3–0	Venezuela	25–20	25–22	25–15			75–57	P2 P3

== Final round ==
- Venue: Belgrade Arena, Belgrade, Serbia
- All times are Central European Summer Time (UTC+02:00).

=== Pool play ===
==== Pool E ====
Pos	Team	Pld	W	L	Pts	SPW	SPL	SPR	SW	SL	SR	Qualification
1	Serbia	2	2	0	6	173	157	1.102	6	1	6.000	Semifinals
2	Russia	2	1	1	3	167	165	1.012	4	3	1.333	Semifinals
3	United States	2	0	2	0	132	150	0.880	0	6	0.000	

Date	Time		Score		Set 1	Set 2	Set 3	Set 4	Set 5	Total	Report
22 Jul	20:37	Serbia	3–0	United States	25–20	25–23	25–22			75–65	P2 P3
23 Jul	20:37	United States	0–3	Russia	22–25	22–25	23–25			67–75	P2 P3
24 Jul	20:37	Russia	1–3	Serbia	23–25	23–25	25–23	21–25		92–98	P2 P3

==== Pool F ====
Pos	Team	Pld	W	L	Pts	SPW	SPL	SPR	SW	SL	SR	Qualification
1	Brazil	2	2	0	6	173	141	1.227	6	1	6.000	Semifinals
2	Cuba	2	1	1	3	178	193	0.922	4	4	1.000	Semifinals
3	Argentina	2	0	2	0	157	174	0.902	1	6	0.167	

Date	Time		Score		Set 1	Set 2	Set 3	Set 4	Set 5	Total	Report
22 Jul	17:37	Argentina	1–3	Cuba	22–25	25–22	24–26	24–26		95–99	P2 P3
23 Jul	17:37	Cuba	1–3	Brazil	18–25	25–23	17–25	19–25		79–98	P2 P3
24 Jul	17:37	Brazil	3–0	Argentina	25–20	25–22	25–20			75–62	P2 P3

=== Final four ===
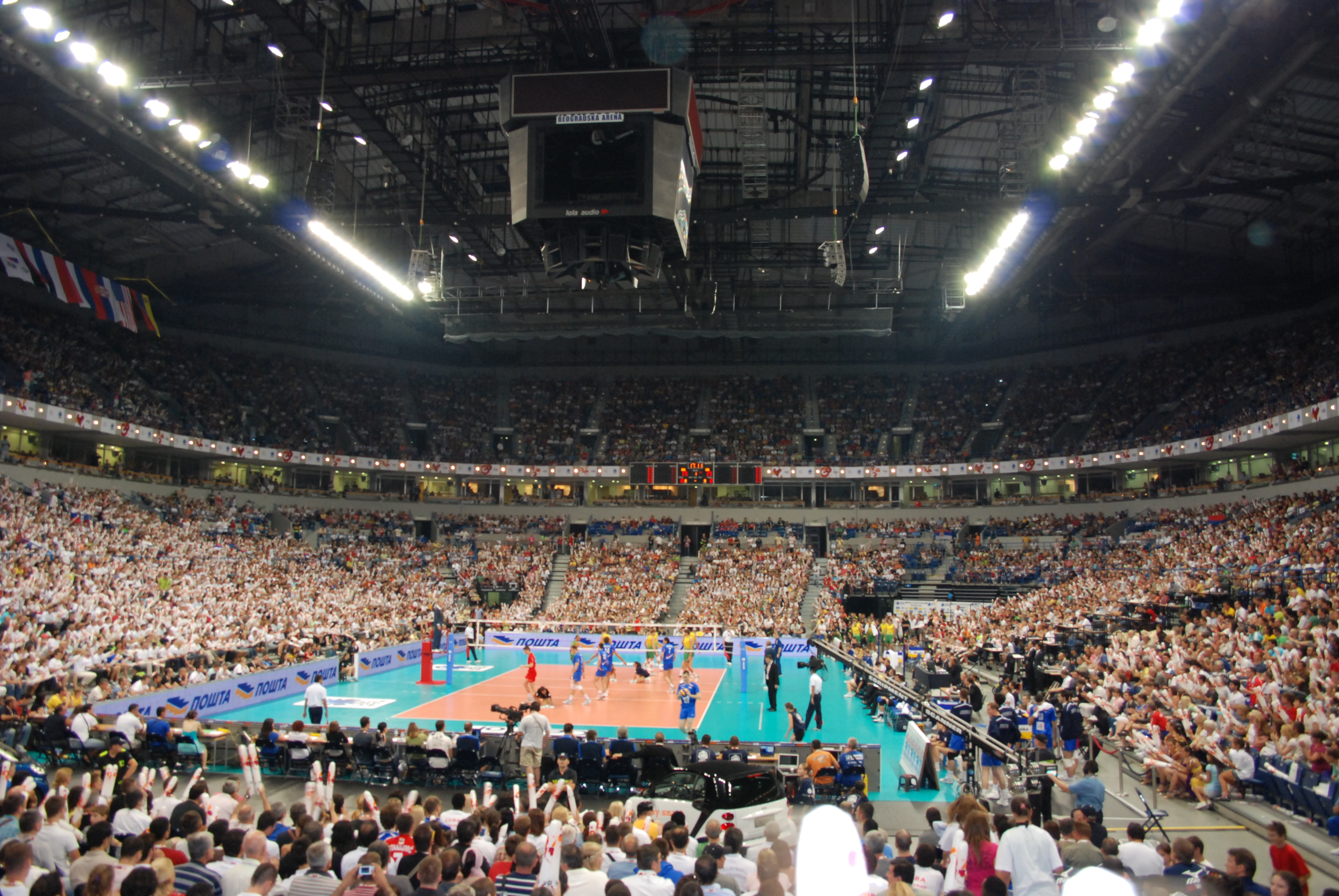
Serbia – Brazil FIVB World League 2009 final in Belgrade Arena, 22,680 spectators

Semifinals
25 July
Brazil	3
Russia	0
25 July
Serbia	3
Cuba	1

Final
26 July
Brazil	3
Serbia	2
3rd place match
26 July
Russia	3
Cuba	0

==== Semifinals ====
Date	Time		Score		Set 1	Set 2	Set 3	Set 4	Set 5	Total	Report
25 Jul	17:37	Brazil	3–0	Russia	25–17	25–21	25–21			75–59	P2 P3
25 Jul	20:37	Serbia	3–1	Cuba	18–25	25–13	25–21	27–25		95–84	P2 P3

==== 3rd place match ====
Date	Time		Score		Set 1	Set 2	Set 3	Set 4	Set 5	Total	Report
26 Jul	17:07	Russia	3–0	Cuba	25–13	26–24	25–16			76–53	P2 P3

==== Final ====
Date	Time		Score		Set 1	Set 2	Set 3	Set 4	Set 5	Total	Report
26 Jul	20:07	Brazil	3–2	Serbia	22–25	25–23	25–22	23–25	15–12	110–107	P2 P3

== Final standing ==
Rank	Team
1st place, gold medalist(s)	Brazil
2nd place, silver medalist(s)	Serbia
3rd place, bronze medalist(s)	Russia
4	Cuba
5	Argentina
6	United States
7	Italy
8	Finland
9	France
10	Bulgaria
11	Poland
12	Netherlands
13	China
14	South Korea
15	Japan
16	Venezuela

2009 World League champions

Brazil
8th title

14-man Roster for Final Round
Bruno, Eder, Sidão, Vissotto, Giba, Murilo, Sérgio, Thiago, João Paulo, Rodrigão, Rivaldo, Lucas, Marlon, Mario Jr.
Head coach
Bernardinho

== Awards ==
- Most valuable player
  (Brazil) Sérgio Santos
- Best scorer
  (Serbia) Ivan Miljković
- Best spiker
  (Cuba) Robertlandy Simón
- Best blocker
  (Cuba) Robertlandy Simón
- Best server
  (Cuba) Wilfredo León
- Best setter
  (Serbia) Nikola Grbić
- Best libero
  (Russia) Aleksey Verbov
