= Filipe Ferraz =

Brazilian volleyball player

Personal information
- Full name: Filipe Augusto Faccion Ferraz
- Born: 1 March 1980 (age 46); Joaíma, Minas Gerais, Brazil
- Height: 194 cm (6 ft 4 in)
- Weight: 90 kg (198 lb)
- Spike: 345 cm (136 in)
- Block: 335 cm (132 in)

Volleyball information
- Position: Outside spiker

Career
Years	Teams
2010–2018	Sada Cruzeiro

Filipe Ferraz (born 1 March 1980) is a former Brazilian male volleyball player. With his club Sada Cruzeiro he competed at the 2012 FIVB Volleyball Men's Club World Championship.

== Sporting achievements ==
As player

=== Clubs ===
- 1999–00 Brazilian Superliga, with Minas Tênis Clube
- 2004–05 Brazilian Superliga, with E.C. Banespa
- 2011–12 Brazilian Superliga, with Sada Cruzeiro
- 2013–14 Brazilian Superliga, with Sada Cruzeiro
- 2014–15 Brazilian Superliga, with Sada Cruzeiro
- 2015–16 Brazilian Superliga, with Sada Cruzeiro
- 2016–17 Brazilian Superliga, with Sada Cruzeiro
- 2017–18 Brazilian Superliga, with Sada Cruzeiro

==== South American Club Championship ====
- 2012 – with Sada Cruzeiro
- 2014 – with Sada Cruzeiro
- 2015 – with Sada Cruzeiro
- 2016 – with Sada Cruzeiro
- 2017 – with Sada Cruzeiro
- 2018 – with Sada Cruzeiro
- 2019 – with Sada Cruzeiro
- 2020 – with Sada Cruzeiro

==== FIVB Club World Championship ====
- 2012 – with Sada Cruzeiro
- 2013 – with Sada Cruzeiro
- 2015 – with Sada Cruzeiro
- 2016 – with Sada Cruzeiro
- 2017 – with Sada Cruzeiro
- 2019 – with Sada Cruzeiro

=== Individual ===
- 2012 Brazilian Superliga – Best Receiver
- 2016 Brazilian Superliga – Best Receiver

As Coach

==== FIVB Club World Championship ====
- 2021 – with Sada Cruzeiro
- 2022 – with Sada Cruzeiro
