= Evandro Guerra =

Brazilian volleyball player

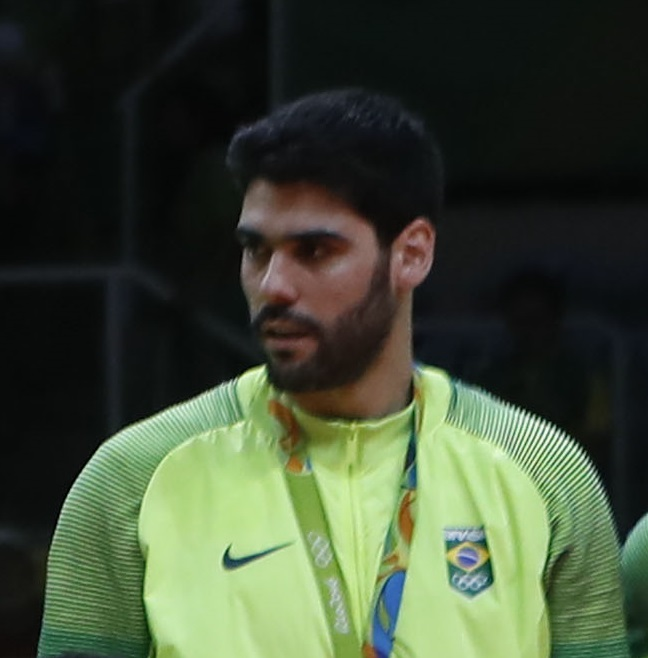

Personal information
- Full name: Evandro Motta Marcondes Guerra
- Nationality: (Brazil) Brazilian
- Born: 27 December 1981 (age 44); Ibirá, São Paulo
- Height: 2.07 m (6 ft 9 in)
- Weight: 103 kg (227 lb)
- Spike: 359 cm (141 in)
- Block: 332 cm (131 in)

Volleyball information
- Position: Opposite
- Current club: (Kuwait) Renata Brasil

Career
Years	Teams
1996–2001; 2001–2002; 2002–2004; 2004–2005; 2005–2006; 2006–2008; 2008–2009; 2009–2011; 2011–2012; 2012–2013; 2013–2014; 2014–2016; 2016–2020; 2020–	(Brazil) EC Banespa (Brazil) ECUS/Suzano (Brazil) EC Santo André (Brazil) Minas Tênis Clube (Brazil) Unisul Esporte Clube (Brazil) Cimed Esporte Clube (Greece) Aris Thessaloniki (Italy) NMV Castellana Grotte (Argentina) Bolívar Voley (Argentina) UPCN Vóley Club (Brazil) SESI São Paulo (Japan) Suntory Sunbirds (Brazil) Sada Cruzeiro; Kuwait SC

National team
2009–	Brazil
Honours
Men's volleyball
Representing Brazil
Olympic Games
Gold medal – first place	2016 Rio de Janeiro
FIVB World Championship
Silver medal – second place	2018 Italy/Bulgaria
FIVB World Grand Champions Cup
Gold medal – first place	2013 Japan
FIVB World League
Silver medal – second place	2016 Kraków
CSV South American Championship
Gold medal – first place	2015 Maceió

Evandro Motta Marcondes Guerra (born 27 December 1981) is a Brazilian volleyball player. He is part of the Brazil men's national volleyball team and Kuwait SC.

== Sporting achievements ==
- FIVB Club World Championship
  - Betim 2016 – with Sada Cruzeiro
  - Betim 2019 – with Sada Cruzeiro
- CSV South American Club Championship
  - Belo Horizonte 2013 – with UPCN Vóley Club
  - Montes Claros 2017 – with Sada Cruzeiro
  - Montes Claros 2018 – with Sada Cruzeiro
  - Belo Horizonte 2019 – with Sada Cruzeiro
  - Contagem 2020 – with Sada Cruzeiro
- National championships
  - 2006/2007 Brazilian Cup, with Cimed Esporte Clube
  - 2007/2008 Brazilian Championship, with Cimed Esporte Clube
  - 2011/2012 Argentine Cup, with Bolívar Voley
  - 2012/2013 Argentine Cup, with UPCN Vóley Club
  - 2012/2013 Argentine Championship, with UPCN Vóley Club
  - 2016/2017 Brazilian SuperCup, with Sada Cruzeiro
  - 2016/2017 Brazilian Championship, with Sada Cruzeiro
  - 2017/2018 Brazilian SuperCup, with Sada Cruzeiro
  - 2017/2018 Brazilian Cup, with Sada Cruzeiro
  - 2017/2018 Brazilian Championship, with Sada Cruzeiro
  - 2018/2019 Brazilian Cup, with Sada Cruzeiro
  - 2019/2020 Brazilian Cup, with Sada Cruzeiro

=== Youth national team ===
- 2001 FIVB U21 World Championship
- 2007 America's Cup

=== Individual awards ===
- 2015: CSV South American Championship – Best opposite spiker
- 2016: FIVB Club World Championship – Best opposite spiker
- 2019: FIVB Club World Championship – Best opposite spiker

Awards
Preceded by (Colombia) Alexander Moreno	Best Opposite Spiker of South American Championship; 2015	Succeeded by (Brazil) Wallace de Souza
Preceded by (Russia) Maxim Mikhaylov	Best Opposite Spiker of FIVB Club World Championship; 2016	Succeeded by (Bulgaria) Tsvetan Sokolov
