= Martín Ramos =

Argentine volleyball player (born 1991)

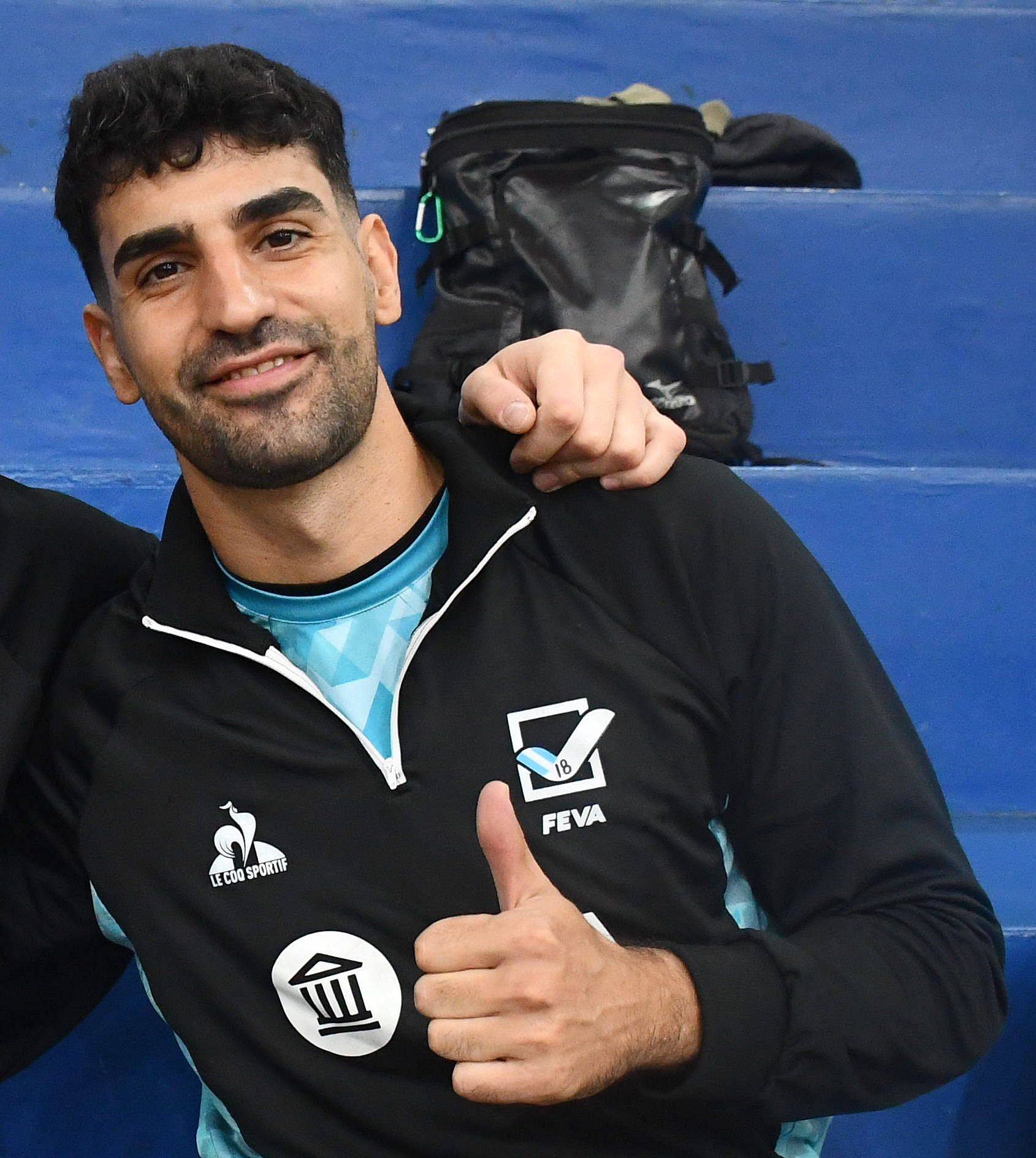
- Ramos in 2024

Personal information
- Born: 26 August 1991 (age 35); Buenos Aires, Argentina
- Height: 1.98 m (6 ft 6 in)
- Weight: 92 kg (203 lb)
- Spike: 350 cm (138 in)
- Block: 330 cm (130 in)

Volleyball information
- Position: Middle blocker
- Current club: Guaguas Las Palmas
- Number: 18

Career
Years	Teams
2010–2011; 2011–2020; 2020–2022; 2022–	Rivadavia Voley; UPCN Vóley Club; Narbonne Volley; Guaguas Las Palmas

National team
2010–	Argentina
Honours
Men's volleyball
Representing Argentina
Olympic Games
Bronze medal – third place	2020 Tokyo
Pan American Games
Gold medal – first place	2015 Toronto
Pan American Cup
Gold medal – first place	2017 Gatineau
Silver medal – second place	2010 San Juan
CSV South American Championship
Gold medal – first place	2023 Recife
Silver medal – second place	2013 Cabo Frio
Silver medal – second place	2019 Chile
Silver medal – second place	2021 Brasília
Bronze medal – third place	2017 Chile

Martín Ramos (born 26 August 1991) is an Argentine professional volleyball player who plays as a middle blocker for Guaguas Las Palmas and the Argentina national team.

== Honours ==
=== Club ===
- CSV South American Club Championship
  - Linares 2012 – with UPCN Vóley Club
  - Belo Horizonte 2013 – with UPCN Vóley Club
  - Belo Horizonte 2014 – with UPCN Vóley Club
  - San Juan 2015 – with UPCN Vóley Club
  - Belo Horizonte 2019 – with UPCN Vóley Club
  - Contagem 2020 – with UPCN Vóley Club
- CEV Challenge Cup
  - 2021–22 – with Narbonne Volley
- Domestic
  - 2011–12 Argentine Championship, with UPCN Vóley Club
  - 2012–13 Argentine Cup, with UPCN Vóley Club
  - 2012–13 Argentine Championship, with UPCN Vóley Club
  - 2013–14 Argentine Cup, with UPCN Vóley Club
  - 2013–14 Argentine Championship, with UPCN Vóley Club
  - 2014–15 Argentine Championship, with UPCN Vóley Club
  - 2015–16 Argentine Cup, with UPCN Vóley Club
  - 2015–16 Argentine Championship, with UPCN Vóley Club
  - 2017–18 Argentine Championship, with UPCN Vóley Club
  - 2019–20 Argentine Cup, with UPCN Vóley Club
  - 2023–24 Spanish SuperCup with Guaguas Las Palmas
  - 2023–24 Spanish Cup, with Guaguas Las Palmas
  - 2023–24 Spanish Championship, with Guaguas Las Palmas

=== Youth national team ===
- 2011 FIVB U21 World Championship

=== Individual awards ===
- 2014: CSV South American Club Championship – Best middle blocker
- 2015: CSV South American Club Championship – Best middle blocker
- 2017: Pan American Cup – Most valuable player
- 2021: CSV South American Championship – Best middle blocker
