= Nicolás Zerba =

Argentine volleyball player (born 1999)

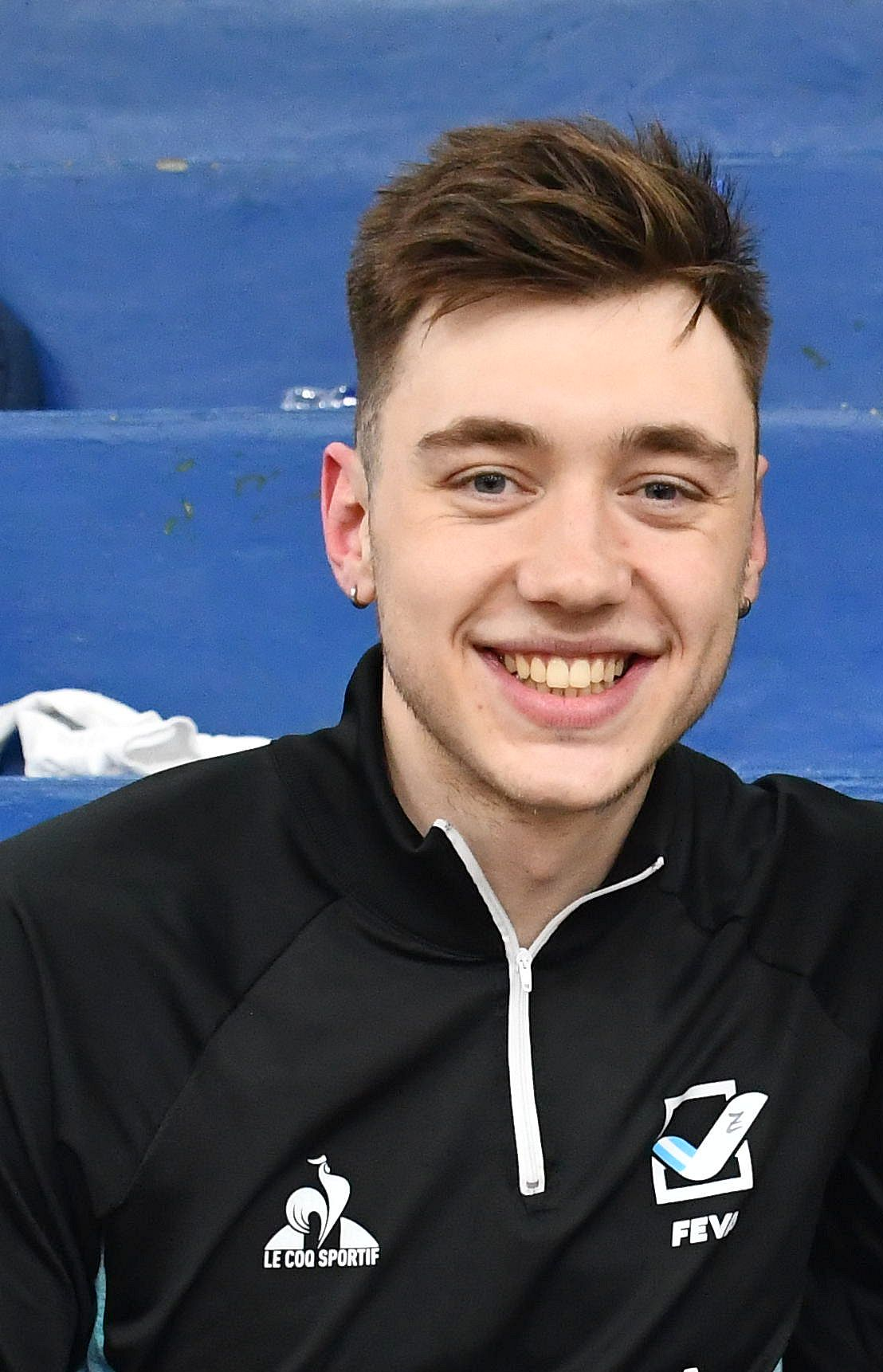
- Zerba in 2024

Personal information
- Born: 13 June 1999 (age 27); Buenos Aires, Argentina
- Height: 2.04 m (6 ft 8 in)

Volleyball information
- Position: Middle blocker

Career
Years	Teams
2017–2020; 2020–2022; 2022–2025	UPCN Vóley Club; Narbonne Volley; Stal Nysa

National team
Argentina
Honours
Men's volleyball
Representing Argentina
Pan American Cup
Gold medal – first place	2018 Córdoba
Silver medal – second place	2019 Colima City
CSV South American Championship
Gold medal – first place	2023 Recife
Silver medal – second place	2019 Chile
Silver medal – second place	2021 Brasília

Nicolás Zerba (born 13 June 1999) is an Argentine professional volleyball player who plays as a middle blocker for the Argentina national team. He took part in the 2022 World Championship, representing Argentina.

== Honours ==
=== Club ===
- CSV South American Club Championship
  - Belo Horizonte 2019 – with UPCN Vóley Club
  - Contagem 2020 – with UPCN Vóley Club
- CEV Challenge Cup
  - 2021–22 – with Narbonne Volley
- Domestic
  - 2017–18 Argentine Championship, with UPCN Vóley Club
  - 2018–19 Argentine Cup, with UPCN Vóley Club

=== Youth national team ===
- 2016 CSV U19 South American Championship
- 2018 CSV U21 South American Championship

=== Individual awards ===
- 2016: CSV U19 South American Championship – Best middle blocker
- 2023: CSV South American Championship – Best middle blocker
