= Sérgio Nogueira =

Brazilian volleyball player (born 1978)

Personal information
- Full name: Sérgio Luiz Seixas Francia Nogueira
- Nickname: Serginho
- Nationality: Brazilian
- Born: 25 August 1978 (age 48); Belo Horizonte, Minas Gerais
- Height: 1.84 m (6 ft 0 in)
- Weight: 80 kg (176 lb)
- Spike: 322 cm (127 in)
- Block: 319 cm (126 in)

Volleyball information
- Position: Libero

Career
Years	Teams
1999–2000	Ulbra/Canoas
2000–2010	Minas Tênis Clube
2010–2019	Sada Cruzeiro
2019–	Black Volley Beskydy

National team
2001–2002	Brazil
Honours
Men's volleyball
Representing Brazil
World Grand Champions Cup
Silver medal – second place	2001 Japan	Team

Sérgio Luiz Seixas Francia Nogueira (born 25 August 1978) is a Brazilian male volleyball player. With his club Sada Cruzeiro he competed at the 2012 FIVB Volleyball Men's Club World Championship.

== Sporting achievements ==
=== Clubs ===
- 2000/2001 Brazilian Superliga, with Minas Tênis Clube
- 2001/2002 Brazilian Superliga, with Minas Tênis Clube
- 2006/2007 Brazilian Superliga, with Minas Tênis Clube
- 2011/2012 Brazilian Superliga, with Sada Cruzeiro
- 2013/2014 Brazilian Superliga, with Sada Cruzeiro
- 2014/2015 Brazilian Superliga, with Sada Cruzeiro
- 2015/2016 Brazilian Superliga, with Sada Cruzeiro
- 2016/2017 Brazilian Superliga, with Sada Cruzeiro
- 2017/2018 Brazilian Superliga, with Sada Cruzeiro

==== South American Club Championship ====
- 1999 – with Minas Tênis Clube
- 2012 – with Sada Cruzeiro
- 2014 – with Sada Cruzeiro
- 2015 – with Sada Cruzeiro
- 2016 – with Sada Cruzeiro
- 2017 – with Sada Cruzeiro
- 2018 – with Sada Cruzeiro
- 2019 – with Sada Cruzeiro

==== FIVB Club World Championship ====
- 2012 – with Sada Cruzeiro
- 2013 – with Sada Cruzeiro
- 2015 – with Sada Cruzeiro
- 2016 – with Sada Cruzeiro
- 2017 – with Sada Cruzeiro

=== Individually ===
- 2012 Brazilian Superliga - Best Receiver
- 2012 South American Club Championship – Best Libero
- 2012 FIVB Club World Championship - Best Receiver
- 2012 FIVB Club World Championship - Best Libero
- 2013 Brazilian Superliga - Best Digger
- 2013 FIVB Club World Championship - Best Libero
- 2015 Brazilian Superliga - Best Digger
- 2015 FIVB Club World Championship - Best Libero
- 2015 South American Club Championship – Best Libero
- 2016 Brazilian Superliga - Best Digger
- 2016 FIVB Club World Championship - Best Libero
- 2017 Brazilian Superliga - Best Digger
- 2018 South American Club Championship – Best Libero
