= Maximiliano Cavanna =

Argentine volleyball player

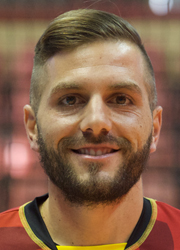

Personal information
- Born: 2 July 1988 (age 38); Buenos Aires, Argentina
- Height: 1.88 m (6 ft 2 in)
- Weight: 81 kg (179 lb)
- Spike: 333 cm (131 in)

Volleyball information
- Position: Setter
- Current club: Olympiacos SF Piraeus
- Number: 19

Career
Years	Teams
2005–2007; 2007–2009; 2009–2010; 2010–2012; 2012–2013; 2013–2014; 2014–2016; 2016–2017; 2017–2019; 2019–2020; 2020–2022; 2022–2023; 2023–11.2023; 11.2023–2024; 2024–2025; 2025–	River Plate; Bolívar Vóley; SOS Villa Maria; La Unión de Formosa; Elettrosud Brolo; Bolívar Vóley; CMC Ravenna; Lomas Vóley; UPCN Vóley Club; Gas Sales Piacenza; Warta Zawiercie; Ural Ufa; Guaguas Las Palmas; Shanghai Bright; Dinamo-LO Sosnowy Bór; Olympiacos SF Piraeus

National team
2011–	Argentina
Honours
Men's volleyball
Representing Argentina
Pan American Games
Bronze medal – third place	2011 Guadalajara
Pan American Cup
Gold medal – first place	2017 Gatineau
Silver medal – second place	2012 Santo Domingo
- Last updated: 14 March 2026

Maximiliano Cavanna (born 2 July 1988) is an Argentine professional volleyball player who plays as a setter for Olympiacos SF Piraeus and the Argentina national team.

== Honours ==
=== Club ===
- CSV South American Club Championship
  - Belo Horizonte 2019 – with UPCN Vóley Club
- National championships
  - 2007–08 Argentine Championship, with Bolívar Vóley
  - 2008–09 Argentine Championship, with Bolívar Vóley
  - 2016–17 Argentine Championship, with Lomas Vóley
  - 2017–18 Argentine Championship, with UPCN Vóley Club
  - 2018–19 Argentine Championship, with UPCN Vóley Club
  - 2021–22 Polish Championship, with Warta Zawiercie
  - 2023–24 Chinese Championship, with Shanghai Bright
- National cups
  - 2007–08 Argentine Cup, with Bolívar Vóley
  - 2008–09 Argentine Cup, with Bolívar Vóley
  - 2010–11 Argentine Cup, with La Unión de Formosa
  - 2011–12 Argentine Cup, with La Unión de Formosa
  - 2013–14 Argentine Super Cup, with Bolívar Vóley
  - 2016–17 Argentine Super Cup, with Lomas Vóley
  - 2016–17 Argentine Cup, with Lomas Vóley
  - 2017–18 Argentine Super Cup, with UPCN Vóley Club
  - 2017–18 Argentine Cup, with UPCN Vóley Club
  - 2023–24 Iberian Cup, with Guaguas Las Palmas
  - 2023–24 Spanish Super Cup, with Guaguas Las Palmas
  - 2025–26 Hellenic League Cup, with Olympiacos Piraeus
  - 2025–26 2025 Hellenic Super Cup, with Olympiacos Piraeus

=== National team ===
- 2011 Pan American Games
- 2017 Pan-American Cup
- 2019 Pan-American Cup

=== Individual awards ===
- 2017: Argentine Championship – Best setter
- 2018: Argentine Championship – Best setter
- 2019: CSV South American Club Championship – Best setter
- 2023: Iberian Cup – MVP
- 2026: 2025 Hellenic Super Cup – MVP
