= 2015 FIVB Volleyball Men's Club World Championship squads =

This article shows all participating team squads at the 2015 FIVB Volleyball Men's Club World Championship, held from 27 to 31 October 2015 in Betim, Brazil.

== Pool A ==
=== Sada Cruzeiro ===
No.	Name	Date of birth	Height	Weight	Spike	Block
1	Alan Souza					
3	Eder Levy Kock					
5	Vanderson Malta					
7	William Arjona					
8	Wallace De Souza					
9	Yoandy Leal Hidalgo					
11	Rodrigo Leao					
12	Isac Santos					
14	Fernando Gil Kreling					
15	Frederic Winters					
16	Eder Carbonera					
17	Sergio Luiz Seixas Francia Nogueira					
18	Filipe Ferraz					
20	Carlos Eduardo Barreto Silva					

=== Capitanes de Arecibo ===
The following is the roster of the Swiss club Capitanes de Arecibo in the 2015 FIVB Club World Championship.

Head coach: (Puerto Rico) David Aleman

No.	Name	Date of birth	Height	Weight	Spike	Block
2	(Puerto Rico) Eduardo Goas	27 January 1989	1.97 m (6 ft 6 in)	95 kg (209 lb)	345 cm (136 in)	330 cm (130 in)
3	(Puerto Rico) Nestor Bracero	1 January 1991	1.85 m (6 ft 1 in)	78 kg (172 lb)	256 cm (101 in)	236 cm (93 in)
4	(Puerto Rico) Pedro Cabrera	15 January 1990	1.85 m (6 ft 1 in)	71 kg (157 lb)	239 cm (94 in)	233 cm (92 in)
5	(Puerto Rico) Josue Suarez	5 June 1992	1.88 m (6 ft 2 in)	77 kg (170 lb)	0 cm (0 in)	0 cm (0 in)
6	(Puerto Rico) Juan Figueroa	6 March 1986	1.89 m (6 ft 2 in)	88 kg (194 lb)	335 cm (132 in)	325 cm (128 in)
7	(Dominican Republic) José Cáceres	24 December 1981	2.10 m (6 ft 11 in)	104 kg (229 lb)	365 cm (144 in)	353 cm (139 in)
8	(Puerto Rico) Alexis Colón	30 May 1990	1.91 m (6 ft 3 in)	76 kg (168 lb)	0 cm (0 in)	0 cm (0 in)
9	(Puerto Rico) Ángel Rolón	5 October 1976	1.80 m (5 ft 11 in)	78 kg (172 lb)	0 cm (0 in)	0 cm (0 in)
10	(Puerto Rico) Ezequiel Cruz	15 July 1986	1.91 m (6 ft 3 in)	85 kg (187 lb)	333 cm (131 in)	326 cm (128 in)
11	(Puerto Rico) Ivan Matos	15 July 1990	1.92 m (6 ft 4 in)	82 kg (181 lb)	0 cm (0 in)	0 cm (0 in)
12	(Puerto Rico) Roberto Muñiz	11 June 1980	1.96 m (6 ft 5 in)	92 kg (203 lb)	333 cm (131 in)	326 cm (128 in)
13	(Puerto Rico) Héctor Soto (C)	28 June 1978	1.97 m (6 ft 6 in)	85 kg (187 lb)	340 cm (130 in)	332 cm (131 in)
