= 2012 Liga Nacional Superior de Voleibol Masculino – Apertura =

The 2012 Liga Nacional Superior de Voleibol Masculino is the 9th official season of the Peruvian Volleyball League, the first round started November 16, 2011 and ended January 22, 2012 and consists of a single Round-Robyn system where all 12 teams will play once against the other 11. Due to the preparation of some of the players for the 2012 Summer Olympics, this round served as the "Apertura" round.

== Competing Teams ==
- Circolo Sportivo Italiano (CSI)
- Flamenco (FLA)
- Hospedaje Casablanca (HCB)
- Huaquillay (HQL)
- Peerless (PRL)
- Regatas Lima (CRL)
- Universidad de Lima (UDL)
- Universidad San Martín (USM)
- Wanka (DWK)

== Final standing procedure ==
1. Match points
2. Numbers of matches won
3. Sets ratio
4. Points ratio

Match won 3–0 or 3–1: 3 match points for the winner, 0 match points for the loser
Match won 3–2: 2 match points for the winner, 1 match point for the loser

== Preliminary round ==
Pos	Team	Pld	W	L	Pts	SPW	SPL	SPR	SW	SL	SR
1	Club Peerless	8	8	0	24	631	455	1.387	24	1	24.000
2	Deportivo Flamenco	8	6	2	19	669	589	1.136	20	9	2.222
3	Regatas Lima	8	6	2	18	678	607	1.117	20	9	2.222
4	Universidad de Lima	8	5	3	14	660	658	1.003	16	14	1.143
5	Universidad San Martin de Porres	8	4	4	12	707	694	1.019	16	15	1.067
6	Deportivo Wanka	8	3	5	8	640	660	0.970	11	18	0.611
7	Hospedaje Casablanca	8	2	6	6	689	763	0.903	12	20	0.600
8	Circolo Sportivo Italiano	8	1	7	5	604	687	0.879	8	22	0.364
9	Asociación Huaquillay	8	1	7	2	487	652	0.747	4	23	0.174

=== Matches ===
Date		Score		Set 1	Set 2	Set 3	Set 4	Set 5	Total
15 June	Peerless	3–0	Circolo Sportivo Italiano	25–20	25–13	25–13			75–46
15 June	Regatas Lima	3–0	Wanka	26–24	25–17	25–18			76–59
16 June	Universidad de Lima	3–1	Huaquillay	25–20	25–12	18–25	25–14		93–71
16 June	Flamenco	3–1	Universidad San Martín	21–25	25–19	25–17	25–17		96–78
20 June	Peerless	3–1	Hospedaje Casablanca	25–18	27–29	25–19	25–13		102–79
20 June	Universidad de Lima	3–2	Universidad San Martín	25–21	13–25	25–19	22–25	15–12	100–102
22 June	Regatas Lima	2–3	Hospedaje Casablanca	25–17	24–26	32–30	23–25	11–15	115–113
22 June	Flamenco	3–1	Circolo Sportivo Italiano	25–10	19–25	25–16	25–22		94–73
23 June	Peerless	3–0	Wanka	27–25	25–18	25–15			77–58
23 June	Hospedaje Casablanca	2–3	Universidad San Martín	26–28	25–23	16–25	28–26	18–20	113–122
23 June	Flamenco	3–0	Huaquillay	25–22	25–17	25–22			75–61
24 June	Hospedaje Casablanca	1–3	Wanka	15–25	25–23	18–25	22–25		80–98
24 June	Huaquillay	3–2	Circolo Sportivo Italiano	25–23	19–25	25–23	20–25	15–12	104–108
24 June	Peerless	3–0	Universidad de Lima	25–17	25–17	25–19			75–53
27 June	Universidad de Lima	3–1	Wanka	24–26	25–18	25–16	26–24		100–84
27 June	Flamenco	2–3	Regatas Lima	25–21	23–25	25–23	18–25	11–15	102–109
29 June	Universidad San Martín	3–0	Circolo Sportivo Italiano	25–18	25–20	25–20			75–58
29 June	Peerless	3–0	Huaquillay	25–18	25–12	25–13			75–43
30 June	Universidad San Martín	3–0	Huaquillay	25–18	26–24	25–15			76–57
30 June	Flamenco	3–0	Wanka	25–12	25–22	25–23			75–60
30 June	Regatas Lima	3–0	Circolo Sportivo Italiano	25–19	28–26	25–18			78–63
01 July	Huaquillay	0–3	Wanka	21–25	14–25	12–25			47–75
01 July	Peerless	3–0	Flamenco	25–18	25–18	25–22			75–58
01 July	Regatas Lima	3–0	Universidad de Lima	25–17	25–17	25–19			75–55
04 July	Hospedaje Casablanca	1–3	Circolo Sportivo Italiano	23–25	12–25	25–18	19–25		79–93
04 July	Regatas Lima	3–0	Huaquillay	25–17	25–22	25–13			75–52
06 July	Flamenco	3–0	Hospedaje Casablanca	26–24	25–12	25–19			76–55
06 July	Peerless	3–0	Universidad San Martín	25–19	25–17	27–25			77–61
07 July	Regatas Lima	3–1	Universidad San Martín	25–20	25–22	18–25	25–21		93–88
07 July	Universidad de Lima	3–1	Hospedaje Casablanca	33–31	25–19	22–25	25–20		105–95
07 July	Wanka	3–2	Circolo Sportivo Italiano	18–25	25–16	21–25	27–25	15–9	106–100
08 July	Hospedaje Casablanca	3–0	Huaquillay	25–20	25–16	25–16			75–52
08 July	Universidad de Lima	3–0	Circolo Sportivo Italiano	26–24	25–20	25–19			76–63
08 July	Peerless	3–0	Regatas Lima	25–22	25–14	25–21			75–57
11 July	Universidad San Martín	3–1	Wanka	25–23	27–29	28–26	25–22		105–100
11 July	Universidad de Lima	1–3	Flamenco	23–25	25–18	16–25	14–25		78–93

== Knockout stage ==
Quarterfinals
Peerless	2
Universidad de Lima	0
Flamenco	2
Regatas Lima	0

Semifinals
Peerless	2
Flamenco	1
Bronze medal match
Universidad de Lima	1
Regatas Lima	2

=== Semifinals ===
Team 1	Agg.	Team 2	1st leg	2nd leg
Peerless	2–0	Universidad de Lima	3–2	3–0
Divino Maestro	2–0	Túpac Amaru	3–0	3–0

Date		Score		Set 1	Set 2	Set 3	Set 4	Set 5	Total
13 July	Peerless	3–2	Universidad de Lima	20–25	25–10	26–24	24–26	15–7	110–72
13 July	Flamenco	3–0	Regatas Lima	25–16	25–23	25–27			75–56

Date		Score		Set 1	Set 2	Set 3	Set 4	Set 5	Total
14 July	Universidad de Lima	0–3	Peerless	22–25	23–25	20–25			65–75
14 July	Regatas Lima	0–3	Flamenco	25–27	28–30	23–25			76–82

=== Bronze Medal Matches ===
Team 1	Agg.	Team 2	1st leg	2nd leg
Regatas Lima	2–1^{1}	Universidad de Lima	3–2	2–3

^{1}Regatas Lima won third leg 3–0.

Date		Score		Set 1	Set 2	Set 3	Set 4	Set 5	Total
20 July	Regatas Lima	3–2	Universidad de Lima	25–17	23–25	20–25	25–13	15–11	108–91
21 July	Universidad de Lima	3–2	Regatas Lima	19–25	25–21	25–21	12–25	15–9	96–101
22 July	Regatas Lima	3–0	Universidad de Lima	25–23	25–23	25–21			75–67

=== Gold Medal Matches ===
Team 1	Agg.	Team 2	1st leg	2nd leg
Peerless	2–1^{1}	Flamenco	3–0	2–3

^{1}Peerless won third leg 3–0.

Date		Score		Set 1	Set 2	Set 3	Set 4	Set 5	Total
20 July	Peerless	3–0	Flamenco	25–19	25–11	25–23			75–53
21 July	Flamenco	3–2	Peerless	20–25	25–23	25–21	18–25	15–12	103–106
22 July	Peerless	3–0	Flamenco	25–17	25–19	25–18			75–54

== Final standing ==
Rank	Team
1st place, gold medalist(s)	Club Peerless
2nd place, silver medalist(s)	Flamenco
3rd place, bronze medalist(s)	Regatas Lima
4	Universidad de Lima
5	Universidad San Martín
6	Wanka
7	Hospedaje Casablanca
8	Circolo Sportivo Italiano
9	Asociación Huaquillay

Team was named Apertura Champion and secured participation in the National Finals against the Clausura Champions

== Individual awards ==
- Most valuable player
  - (Peru) Luis Soto (Club Peerless)
- Best scorer
  - (Ecuador) Andrés Quiñonez (Hospedaje Casablanca)
- Best spiker
  - (Peru) Luis Soto (Club Peerless)
- Best blocker
  - (Peru) Héctor Manrique (Regatas Lima)
- Best server
  - (Peru) Luis Soto (Club Peerless)
- Best digger
  - (Peru) Renzo Delgado (Club Peerless)
- Best setter
  - (Colombia) Julian Vinasco (Regatas Lima)
- Best receiver
  - (Peru) Jonathan Vega (Universidad San Martín)
- Best libero
  - (Peru) Luis Torres (Universidad de Lima)
