= Liga Peruana de Vóley Masculino =

Peruvian volleyball competition

Liga Peruana de Vóley
- Sport: Volleyball
- Founded: 1969
- No. of teams: 9
- Country: Peru
- Most recent champion: Regatas Lima (3)
- Most titles: Peerless (10)
- International cup: Campeonato Sudamericano de Clubes de Voleibol Masculino

The Liga Peruana de Vóley (Spanish for Peruvian Volleyball League) is the top level Peruvian volleyball competition and it is organized by the Peruvian Volleyball Confederation. There are both men's and women's competitions. The number of participating clubs has been 12 per division since the 2011–12 season. The team champions qualify for the men's and women's South American Volleyball Club Championship.

== History ==
Prior to the Liga Nacional Superior de Voleibol, the Peruvian Volleyball Federation had an inter-club competition known as the "Disunvol". The Disunvol was dissolved in 2002 following the FIVB's decision to disenroll Peru from all competitions.

Although Peru had volleyball competitions prior to 2004, in that year the Federación Peruana de Voleibol, Peru's Volleyball Confederation, organized the first tournament. The original format was heavily criticized due to poor organization from the sponsors and the teams. However, after Telefónica (now Movistar) decided to sponsor the Liga Nacional and change the format to include more teams and make the tournament more competitive, it grew, even becoming the qualifying tournament for Peruvian volleyball clubs to the South American Volleyball Club Championship. In this edition, the tournament adopts the commercial name Liga Peruana de Vóley Apuesta Total3, thanks to the sponsorship of the sports betting company Apuesta Total, whose agreement will be in effect until the end of the season. In terms of television broadcasting, the league will no longer be exclusive to Movistar Deportes4. On November 5, 2024, it was announced that Latina Televisión5 will be the new official channel, broadcasting 92 matches on open signal and 120 through its digital platforms6. However, on November 28, Movistar Deportes confirmed that it will continue to offer live broadcasts on its channels and digital media7. This season promises intense emotions with ambitious goals among the participating teams. Alianza Lima will seek its first double championship in the history of the tournament, while Regatas Lima will try to return to the podium and achieve its tenth title. For its part, USMP emerges as a strong contender in the fight for its sixth crown. With these goals at stake, a highly competitive and vibrant edition is expected.

== Format ==
The original format that was used from 2004 to 2007–08 had 12 teams in two pools of 6, each team played once against the other 5 teams in the pool, after the first round matches were played, the 3 top teams from each pool formed a new final pool where the winner was declared champion while the bottom 3 teams from each pool played against each other as the bottom 2 teams from that round lost the category.

After Telefónica Peru joined the organizing comite, the format changed to include teams from clubs from all states in Peru and not just Lima. The competition had two parts, the Apertura and Clausura.

The Apertura was played first, consisted of a Round-Robyn system between 14 and 16 teams, after all matches are played the top 8 teams will move on while the bottom 6 or 8 teams are eliminated, the bottom 2 teams are at risk of losing the category. The top 8 teams will play the quarterfinals as follows: 1° VS 8°, 2° VS 7°, 3° VS 6° and 4° VS 5°. The winners will play the semifinals with the winning team from the 1° VS 8° match against the winner from the 4° VS 5° match, and the other two winning teams will play the other semifinal. The winners from the semifinals play for the first place while the losers play for the third place.

The Clausura was played a few months later, the top 8 teams will compete again in a Round-Robyn system, the top 4 teams will advance to the second round, in case the winning team from the Apertura finishes in 5th to 8th place, they will still advance to the second round with the top 3 teams. The 4 remaining teams will play against each other again, after each team has played the other 3, the ranking determines the semifinals, 1° VS 4° and 2° VS 3° with the winners from each match competing for the gold medal and the title of Champions of the Season while the losing teams play for the bronze medal.

As of the 2011–12 season, the competition uses the Regular Season formula which is 12 teams play two Round-Robyn tournaments, "Home and Away", the top eight teams after both rounds play the quarterfinals as follows: 1° VS 8°, 2° VS 7°, 3° VS 6° and 4° VS 5°. The winners will play the semifinals with the winning team from the 1° VS 8° match against the winner from the 4° VS 5° match, and the other two winning teams will play the other semifinal. The winners from the semifinals play for the first place while the losers play for the third place.

The winning team from the season qualifies for the Men's South American Volleyball Club Championship.

== List of Champions ==
Ed.	Season	Champion	Runner-up	Third place
Liga Nacional Superior de Voleibol (LNSV)
1	2004	Wanka Callao	Regatas Lima	
2	2005	Wanka Callao	Regatas Lima	
3	2006	Wanka Callao	Regatas Lima	
4	2007	Wanka Callao	Regatas Lima	
5	2008	Asociación Huaquillay	Flamenco	
6	2009	Wanka Callao	Asociación Huaquillay	
7	2010	Peerless	Universidad de Lima	
8	2011	Peerless	Flamenco	
9	2012	Vamos Peerless	Flamenco	Regatas Lima
10	2013	Vamos Peerless	Flamenco	Regatas Lima
11	2014	Universidad San Martín	Vamos Peerless	Regatas Lima
12	2015	Vamos Peerless	Universidad San Martín	Regatas Lima
13	2016	Unilever	Regatas Lima	Vamos Peerless
14	2017	Vamos Peerless	Regatas Lima	Unilever
15	2018	Regatas Lima	Vamos Peerless	Sparteam
16	2019	Regatas Lima	Vamos Peerless	Sparteam
–	2020	Canceled due to the COVID-19 pandemic		
17	2021	Vamos Peerless	Regatas Lima	Junior Sade
18	2022	Vamos Peerless	Regatas Lima	Junior Sade
19	2023	Vamos Peerless	Regatas Lima	DC Asociados
20	2024	Vamos Peerless	Litovóley	Regatas Lima
Liga Peruana de Vóley (LPV)
21	2025	Regatas Lima	Von Newman	Vamos Peerless
22	2026			

== Titles by club ==
Rank	Club	Winners	Runners-up	Seasons won	Seasons runner-up
1	Vamos Peerless	10	3	2010, 2011, 2012, 2013, 2015, 2017, 2021, 2022, 2023, 2024	2014, 2018, 2019
2	Wanka Callao	5	—	2004, 2005, 2006, 2007, 2009	—
3	Regatas Lima	3	9	2018, 2019, 2025	2004, 2005, 2006, 2007, 2016, 2017, 2021, 2022, 2023
4	Asociación Huaquillay	1	1	2008	2009
4	Universidad San Martín	1	1	2014	2015
4	Unilever	1	—	2016	—

== See also ==
- Peru women's national volleyball team
- Peru men's national volleyball team
- Volleyball Copa Latina
- Liga Peruana de Vóley Femenino
