= 2011 Men's South American Volleyball Club Championship =

Tournament details
- Host country: Brazil
- Dates: August 3 – 7
- Teams: 5
- Venue: 1 (in São Paulo host cities)

Final positions
- Champions: (Brazil) SESI São Paulo (1st title)

Tournament awards
- MVP: (Brazil) Murilo Endres (SES)

The 2011 Men's South American Volleyball Club Championship was the third official edition of the men's volleyball tournament, played by five teams over August 3 – 7, 2011 in São Paulo, Brazil. The winning team qualified for the 2011 FIVB Men's Club World Championship.

== Competing clubs ==
Clubs

(Brazil) SESI São Paulo
(Argentina) UPCN San Juan
(Chile) Universidad Católica
(Peru) Club Peerless
Ingenieros de Bolivia

== Round robin ==
Pos	Team	Pld	W	L	Pts	SW	SL	SR	SPW	SPL	SPR
1	(Brazil) SESI São Paulo	4	4	0	8	12	0	MAX	300	163	1.840
2	(Argentina) UPCN San Juan	4	3	1	7	9	3	3.000	271	210	1.290
3	(Chile) Universidad Católica	4	2	2	6	6	8	0.750	281	300	0.937
4	(Peru) Club Peerless	4	1	3	5	5	9	0.556	278	330	0.842
5	Ingenieros de Bolivia	4	0	4	4	0	12	0.000	184	311	0.592

Date		Score		Set 1	Set 2	Set 3	Set 4	Set 5	Total
3 Aug	SESI São Paulo (Brazil)	3–0	(Peru) Club Peerless	25–8	25–18	25–7			75–33
3 Aug	Ingenieros de Bolivia	0–3	(Chile) Universidad Católica	13–25	9–25	19–25			41–75
4 Aug	SESI São Paulo (Brazil)	3–0	Ingenieros de Bolivia	25–13	25–10	25–12			75–35
4 Aug	UPCN San Juan (Argentina)	3–0	(Peru) Club Peerless	25–14	25–17	25–19			75–50
5 Aug	UPCN San Juan (Argentina)	3–0	Ingenieros de Bolivia	25–13	25–15	25–14			75–42
5 Aug	Universidad Católica (Chile)	0–3	(Brazil) SESI São Paulo	10–25	19–25	14–25			43–75
6 Aug	Club Peerless (Peru)	3–0	Ingenieros de Bolivia	25–18	25–14	36–34			86–66
6 Aug	UPCN San Juan (Argentina)	3–0	(Chile) Universidad Católica	25–15	25–19	25–9			75–43
7 Aug	Universidad Católica (Chile)	3–2	(Peru) Club Peerless	25–15	30–28	22–25	23–25	14–16	114–109
7 Aug	SESI São Paulo (Brazil)	3–0	(Argentina) UPCN San Juan	25–16	25–15	25–15			75–46

== Final standing ==
Rank	Team
1st place, gold medalist(s)	(Brazil) SESI São Paulo
2nd place, silver medalist(s)	(Argentina) UPCN San Juan
3rd place, bronze medalist(s)	(Chile) Universidad Católica
4	(Peru) Club Peerless
5	Ingenieros de Bolivia

Qualified for the 2011 FIVB Men's Club World Championship

2011 Men's South American Volleyball Club Champions

1st title
