= 2016 Men's South American Volleyball Club Championship =

2016 Men's South American Club Championship
Tournament details
- Host country: Brazil
- Dates: 17–21 February
- Teams: 8
- Venue: 1 (in 1 host city)

Final positions
- Champions: (Brazil) Sada Cruzeiro (3rd title)

Tournament awards
- MVP: (Cuba) Yoandry Leal (SDC)

The 2016 Men's South American Volleyball Club Championship was the eighth official edition of the men's volleyball tournament, played by eight teams from 17 to 21 February 2016 in Taubate, Brazil.

Sada Cruzeiro defeated the local team Funvic Taubaté in the final match, and qualified for the 2016 Club World Championship.

== Pools composition ==
Pool A	Pool B
(Argentina) UPCN San Juan (Argentina) Personal Bolívar (Chile) Club Linares (Note: Club Linares could not take part in the competition, however, instead of not participating, the matches were played and the opposite team was granted a W.O.) (Peru) Peerless	(Brazil) Funvic Taubaté (Brazil) Sada Cruzeiro (Uruguay) Atlético Bohemios (Bolivia) San Martin

== Preliminary round ==
- All times are Brasilia Time (UTC−03:00).

=== Pool A ===
Pos	Team	Pld	W	L	Pts	SW	SL	SR	SPW	SPL	SPR	Qualification
1	(Argentina) Personal Bolívar	3	3	0	9	9	0	MAX	225	105	2.143	Semifinals
2	(Argentina) UPCN San Juan	3	2	1	6	6	3	2.000	214	131	1.634	Semifinals
3	(Peru) Peerless	3	1	2	3	3	6	0.500	173	151	1.146	5th place match
4	(Chile) Club Linares	3	0	3	0	0	9	0.000	0	225	0.000	

Date	Time		Score		Set 1	Set 2	Set 3	Set 4	Set 5	Total
17 Feb	14:00	Personal Bolívar (Argentina)	3–0	(Chile) Club Linares	25–0	25–0	25–0			75–0
17 Feb	16:00	Peerless (Peru)	0–3	(Argentina) UPCN San Juan	11–25	21–25	24–26			56–76
18 Feb	14:00	UPCN San Juan (Argentina)	3–0	(Chile) Club Linares	25–0	25–0	25–0			75–0
18 Feb	16:00	Personal Bolívar (Argentina)	3–0	(Peru) Peerless	25–11	25–16	25–15			75–42
19 Feb	14:00	Peerless (Peru)	3–0	(Chile) Club Linares	25–0	25–0	25–0			75–0
19 Feb	16:00	Personal Bolívar (Argentina)	3–0	(Argentina) UPCN San Juan	25–19	25–22	25–22			75–63

=== Poolb ===
Pos	Team	Pld	W	L	Pts	SW	SL	SR	SPW	SPL	SPR	Qualification
1	(Brazil) Sada Cruzeiro	3	3	0	9	9	1	9.000	245	157	1.561	Semifinals
2	(Brazil) Funvic Taubaté	3	2	1	6	7	3	2.333	237	156	1.519	Semifinals
3	(Uruguay) Atlético Bohemios	3	1	2	3	3	6	0.500	145	207	0.700	5th place match
4	(Bolivia) San Martin	3	0	3	0	0	9	0.000	118	225	0.524	

Date	Time		Score		Set 1	Set 2	Set 3	Set 4	Set 5	Total
17 Feb	18:00	Funvic Taubaté (Brazil)	3–0	(Bolivia) San Martin	25–9	25–6	25–10			75–25
17 Feb	20:00	Sada Cruzeiro (Brazil)	3–0	(Uruguay) Atlético Bohemios	25–17	25–9	25–8			75–34
18 Feb	18:00	Atlético Bohemios (Uruguay)	3–0	(Bolivia) San Martin	25–22	25–15	25–20			75–57
18 Feb	20:00	Funvic Taubaté (Brazil)	1–3	(Brazil) Sada Cruzeiro	25–20	20–25	19–25	23–25		87–95
19 Feb	18:00	Funvic Taubaté (Brazil)	3–0	(Uruguay) Atlético Bohemios	25–13	25–10	25–13			75–36
19 Feb	20:00	San Martin (Bolivia)	0–3	(Brazil) Sada Cruzeiro	10–25	12–25	14–25			36–75

== Final standing ==
Rank	Team
1st place, gold medalist(s)	(Brazil) Sada Cruzeiro
2nd place, silver medalist(s)	(Brazil) Funvic Taubaté
3rd place, bronze medalist(s)	(Argentina) UPCN San Juan
4	(Argentina) Personal Bolívar
5	(Peru) Peerless
6	(Uruguay) Atlético Bohemios
7	(Bolivia) San Martin
8	(Chile) Club Linares

Qualified for the 2016 Club World Championship

2016 Men's South American Club Champions

3rd title

== Awards ==
- Most valuable player
  (Cuba) Yoandry Leal (Sada Cruzeiro)
- Best setter
  (Brazil) William Arjona (Sada Cruzeiro)
- Best outside spikers
  (Brazil) Ricardo Lucarelli Souza (Funvic Taubaté)
  (Bulgaria) Nikolay Uchikov (UPCN San Juan)
- Best middle blockers
  (Brazil) Isac Santos (Sada Cruzeiro)
  (Brazil) Deivid Costa (Funvic Taubaté)
- Best opposite spiker
  (Brazil) Wallace de Souza (Sada Cruzeiro)
- Best libero
  (Brazil) Felipe Silva (Funvic Taubaté)
