= 2012 Liga Nacional Superior de Voleibol Masculino =

The 2012–13 Liga Nacional Superior de Voleibol Masculino (Spanish for: 2011-12 Men's Senior National Volleyball League) was the ninth official season of the Peruvian Volleyball League. The winning club will qualify to the Men's South American Volleyball Club Championship.

== Competing teams ==
- Circolo Sportivo Italiano (CSI)
- Flamenco (FLA)
- Hospedaje Casablanca (HCB)
- Huaquillay (HQL)
- Peerless (PRL)
- Regatas Lima (CRL)
- Universidad de Lima (UDL)
- Universidad San Martín (USM)
- Wanka (WKA)

== Competition format ==
This season uses an "Apertura and Clausura" format, first, the "Apertura" is played, with the 9 teams competing in a Round-Robyn System against each of the other eight teams. After the Round-Robyn finishes, the top four teams play semifinals as follows: 1st VS. 4th and 2nd VS. 3rd, the winners move on to the Apertura Finals. The "Clausura" is played after a break from the Apertura, with exactly the same format. After the Clausura finishes, a play-off between the winners from the Apertura and the Clausura determines the champion of the season, in case one team wins both tournaments, that team is declared the champion.

=== Apertura ===
Pool standing procedure

1. Match points
2. Numbers of matches won
3. Sets ratio
4. Points ratio

Match won 3–0 or 3–1: 3 match points for the winner, 0 match points for the loser
Match won 3–2: 2 match points for the winner, 1 match point for the loser

Ranking

Pos	Team	Pld	W	L	Pts	SPW	SPL	SPR	SW	SL	SR
1	Club Peerless	8	8	0	24	631	455	1.387	24	1	24.000
2	Deportivo Flamenco	8	6	2	19	669	589	1.136	20	9	2.222
3	Regatas Lima	8	6	2	18	678	607	1.117	20	9	2.222
4	Universidad de Lima	8	5	3	14	660	658	1.003	16	14	1.143
5	Universidad San Martin de Porres	8	4	4	12	707	694	1.019	16	15	1.067
6	Deportivo Wanka	8	3	5	8	640	660	0.970	11	18	0.611
7	Hospedaje Casablanca	8	2	6	6	689	763	0.903	12	20	0.600
8	Circolo Sportivo Italiano	8	1	7	5	604	687	0.879	8	22	0.364
9	Asociación Huaquillay	8	1	7	2	487	652	0.747	4	23	0.174

== Knockout stage ==
Quarterfinals
Peerless	2
Universidad de Lima	0
Flamenco	2
Regatas Lima	0

Semifinals
Peerless	2
Flamenco	1
Bronze medal match
Universidad de Lima	1
Regatas Lima	2

=== Semifinals ===
Team 1	Agg.	Team 2	1st leg	2nd leg
Peerless	2–0	Universidad de Lima	3–2	3–0
Divino Maestro	2–0	Túpac Amaru	3–0	3–0

Date		Score		Set 1	Set 2	Set 3	Set 4	Set 5	Total
13 July	Peerless	3–2	Universidad de Lima	20–25	25–10	26–24	24–26	15–7	110–72
13 July	Flamenco	3–0	Regatas Lima	25–16	25–23	25–27			75–56

Date		Score		Set 1	Set 2	Set 3	Set 4	Set 5	Total
14 July	Universidad de Lima	0–3	Peerless	22–25	23–25	20–25			65–75
14 July	Regatas Lima	0–3	Flamenco	25–27	28–30	23–25			76–82

=== Bronze Medal Matches ===
Team 1	Agg.	Team 2	1st leg	2nd leg
Regatas Lima	2–1^{1}	Universidad de Lima	3–2	2–3

^{1}Regatas Lima won third leg 3-0.

Date		Score		Set 1	Set 2	Set 3	Set 4	Set 5	Total
20 July	Regatas Lima	3–2	Universidad de Lima	25–17	23–25	20–25	25–13	15–11	108–91
21 July	Universidad de Lima	3–2	Regatas Lima	19–25	25–21	25–21	12–25	15–9	96–101
22 July	Regatas Lima	3–0	Universidad de Lima	25–23	25–23	25–21			75–67

=== Gold Medal Matches ===
Team 1	Agg.	Team 2	1st leg	2nd leg
Peerless	2–1^{1}	Flamenco	3–0	2–3

^{1}Peerless won third leg 3-0.

Date		Score		Set 1	Set 2	Set 3	Set 4	Set 5	Total
20 July	Peerless	3–0	Flamenco	25–19	25–11	25–23			75–53
21 July	Flamenco	3–2	Peerless	20–25	25–23	25–21	18–25	15–12	103–106
22 July	Peerless	3–0	Flamenco	25–17	25–19	25–18			75–54

== Final standings ==
Rank	Team
1st place, gold medalist(s)	Club Peerless
2nd place, silver medalist(s)	Flamenco
3rd place, bronze medalist(s)	Regatas Lima
4	Universidad de Lima
5	Universidad San Martín
6	Deportivo Wanka
7	Hospedaje Casablanca
8	Circolo Sportivo Italiano
9	Asociación Huaquillay

Team was named Apertura Champion and secured participation in the National Finals against the Clausura Champions

== Individual awards ==
- Most valuable player
  - (Peru) Luis Soto (Club Peerless)
- Best scorer
  - (Peru) Francis Mendoza (Deportivo Flamenco)
- Best spiker
  - (Ecuador) Luis Izquierdo (Deportivo Flamenco)
- Best blocker
  - (Peru) Ignacio Correa (Universidad de Lima)
- Best server
  - (Peru) Luis Soto (Club Peerless)
- Best digger
  - (Peru) Renzo Delgado (Club Peerless)
- Best setter
  - (Colombia) Julian Vinasco (Regatas Lima)
- Best receiver
  - (Argentina) Martin Portillo (Club Peerless)
- Best libero
  - (Peru) Renzo Delgado (Club Peerless)
