= 2014 Men's South American Volleyball Club Championship =

2014 Men's South American Club Championship
Tournament details
- Host country: Brazil
- Dates: 19–23 February
- Teams: 8
- Venue: 1 (in 1 host city)

Final positions
- Champions: (Brazil) Sada Cruzeiro (2nd title)

Tournament awards
- MVP: (Brazil) Wallace de Souza (SDC)

The 2014 Men's South American Volleyball Club Championship was the sixth official edition of the men's volleyball tournament, played by eight teams over 19–23 February 2014 in Belo Horizonte, Brazil. The best placed team except 2014 FIVB Volleyball Men's Club World Championship hosts Sada Cruzeiro qualified for the 2014 Club World Championship.

== Pools composition ==
Pool A	Pool B
(Argentina) Boca Juniors (Peru) Club LNSV (Argentina) UPCN San Juan (Bolivia) Universidad de la Salle	(Brazil) Sada Cruzeiro (Uruguay) Nacional (Brazil) Vivo Minas (Chile) Club ADO

== Venue ==
- Vivo Arena, Belo Horizonte, Brazil

== Preliminary round ==
- All times are Brasília Time (UTC−03:00).

=== Pool A ===
Pos	Team	Pld	W	L	Pts	SW	SL	SR	SPW	SPL	SPR	Qualification
1	(Argentina) UPCN San Juan	3	3	0	8	9	2	4.500	262	179	1.464	Semifinals
2	(Argentina) Boca Juniors	3	2	1	7	8	3	2.667	254	207	1.227	Semifinals
3	(Peru) Club LNSV	3	1	2	3	3	7	0.429	200	233	0.858	5th place match
4	(Bolivia) Universidad de la Salle	3	0	3	0	1	9	0.111	153	250	0.612	7th place match

Date	Time		Score		Set 1	Set 2	Set 3	Set 4	Set 5	Total
19 Feb	15:00	Boca Juniors (Argentina)	3–0	(Peru) Club LNSV	25–20	25–17	25–18			75–55
19 Feb	21:30	UPCN San Juan (Argentina)	3–0	(Bolivia) Universidad de la Salle	25–10	25–9	25–11			75–30
20 Feb	15:00	Boca Juniors (Argentina)	3–0	(Bolivia) Universidad de la Salle	25–11	25–13	25–16			75–40
20 Feb	21:00	UPCN San Juan (Argentina)	3–0	(Peru) Club LNSV	25–14	25–9	25–22			75–45
21 Feb	17:00	Club LNSV (Peru)	3–1	(Bolivia) Universidad de la Salle	25–19	25–27	25–21	25–16		100–83
21 Feb	21:00	Boca Juniors (Argentina)	2–3	(Argentina) UPCN San Juan	25–22	18–25	25–23	25–27	11–15	104–112

=== Pool B ===
Pos	Team	Pld	W	L	Pts	SW	SL	SR	SPW	SPL	SPR	Qualification
1	(Brazil) Sada Cruzeiro	3	3	0	9	9	1	9.000	248	157	1.580	Semifinals
2	(Brazil) Vivo Minas	3	2	1	6	7	3	2.333	235	184	1.277	Semifinals
3	(Chile) Club ADO	3	1	2	3	3	6	0.500	163	197	0.827	5th place match
4	(Uruguay) Nacional	3	0	3	0	0	9	0.000	117	225	0.520	7th place match

Date	Time		Score		Set 1	Set 2	Set 3	Set 4	Set 5	Total
19 Feb	17:00	Sada Cruzeiro (Brazil)	3–0	(Uruguay) Nacional	25–12	25–12	25–8			75–32
19 Feb	19:30	Vivo Minas (Brazil)	3–0	(Chile) Club ADO	25–18	25–15	25–15			75–48
20 Feb	17:00	Sada Cruzeiro (Brazil)	3–0	(Chile) Club ADO	25–12	25–18	25–10			75–40
20 Feb	19:00	Vivo Minas (Brazil)	3–0	(Uruguay) Nacional	25–16	25–12	25–10			75–38
21 Feb	15:00	Nacional (Uruguay)	0–3	(Chile) Club ADO	15–25	13–25	19–25			47–75
21 Feb	19:00	Vivo Minas (Brazil)	1–3	(Brazil) Sada Cruzeiro	25–22	17–25	19–25	24–26		85–98

== Final round ==
- All times are Brasília Time (UTC−03:00).

=== Bracket ===
Semifinals
22 February
(Argentina) UPCN San Juan	3
(Brazil) Vivo Minas	2
22 February
(Brazil) Sada Cruzeiro	3
(Argentina) Boca Juniors	0

Final
23 February
(Argentina) UPCN San Juan	2
(Brazil) Sada Cruzeiro	3
3rd place match
23 February
(Brazil) Vivo Minas	3
(Argentina) Boca Juniors	0

=== Semifinals ===
Date	Time		Score		Set 1	Set 2	Set 3	Set 4	Set 5	Total
22 Feb	19:00	Sada Cruzeiro (Brazil)	3–0	(Argentina) Boca Juniors	25–16	25–16	25–19			75–51
22 Feb	21:00	UPCN San Juan (Argentina)	3–2	(Brazil) Vivo Minas	22–25	25–21	32–30	21–25	15–12	115–113

=== 7th place match ===
Date	Time		Score		Set 1	Set 2	Set 3	Set 4	Set 5	Total
22 Feb	15:00	Universidad de la Salle (Bolivia)	1–3	(Uruguay) Nacional	22–25	25–22	18–25	23–25		88–97

=== 5th place match ===
Date	Time		Score		Set 1	Set 2	Set 3	Set 4	Set 5	Total
22 Feb	17:00	Club LNSV (Peru)	0–3	(Chile) Club ADO	20–25	21–25	25–27			66–77

=== 3rd place match ===
Date	Time		Score		Set 1	Set 2	Set 3	Set 4	Set 5	Total
23 Feb	17:30	Vivo Minas (Brazil)	3–0	(Argentina) Boca Juniors	25–17	25–23	25–16			75–56

=== Final ===
Date	Time		Score		Set 1	Set 2	Set 3	Set 4	Set 5	Total
23 Feb	20:30	UPCN San Juan (Argentina)	2–3	(Brazil) Sada Cruzeiro	25–23	25–23	20–25	19–25	16–18	105–114

== Final standing ==
Rank	Team
1st place, gold medalist(s)	(Brazil) Sada Cruzeiro
2nd place, silver medalist(s)	(Argentina) UPCN San Juan
3rd place, bronze medalist(s)	(Brazil) Vivo Minas
4	(Argentina) Boca Juniors
5	(Chile) Club ADO
6	(Peru) Club LNSV
7	(Uruguay) Nacional
8	(Bolivia) Universidad de la Salle

Qualified for the 2014 Club World Championship
Qualified as hosts for the 2014 Club World Championship

2014 Men's South American Club Champions

2nd title

== Awards ==
- Most valuable player
  (Brazil) Wallace de Souza (Sada Cruzeiro)
- Best setter
  (Argentina) Demián González (UPCN San Juan)
- Best outside spikers
  (Cuba) Yoandry Leal (Sada Cruzeiro)
  (Brazil) Raphael Thiago Oliveira (Vivo Minas)
- Best middle blockers
  (Brazil) Isac Santos (Sada Cruzeiro)
  (Argentina) Martín Ramos (UPCN San Juan)
- Best opposite spiker
  (Brazil) Wallace de Souza (Sada Cruzeiro)
- Best libero
  (Argentina) Sebastián Garrocq (UPCN San Juan)
