= Pablo Crer =

Argentine volleyball player (born 1989)

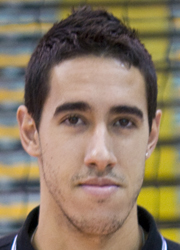

Personal information
- Full name: Pablo Damián Crer
- Born: 12 June 1989 (age 37); Rosario, Argentina
- Height: 2.05 m (6 ft 9 in)
- Weight: 82 kg (181 lb)
- Spike: 350 cm (138 in)

Volleyball information
- Position: Middle blocker
- Current club: Paris Volley
- Number: 14

Career
| Years | Teams |
|---|---|
| 2008–2010; 2010–2011; 2011–2013; 2013–2014; 2014–2019; 2019–2022; 2022– | Rosario Sonder; Rivadavia Voley; Bolívar Vóley; Volley Callipo; Bolívar Vóley; Trefl Gdańsk; Paris Volley |

National team
| 2010–2021 | Argentina |
Honours
Men's volleyball
Representing Argentina
Pan American Games
| Gold medal – first place | 2015 Toronto |
| Bronze medal – third place | 2011 Guadalajara |
Pan American Cup
| Gold medal – first place | 2017 Gatineau |
| Silver medal – second place | 2010 San Juan |
CSV South American Championship
| Silver medal – second place | 2011 Cuiabá |
| Silver medal – second place | 2013 Cabo Frio |
| Bronze medal – third place | 2017 Chile |

Pablo Damián Crer (born 12 June 1989) is an Argentine professional volleyball player. He was part of the Argentina national team in 2010–2021, and a participant at the Olympic Games (London 2012, Rio 2016). At the professional club level, he plays for Paris Volley.

== Career ==
=== Clubs ===
Crer started playing volleyball in Rosario for the team Sonder, a Santa Fe club that grows and develops talented players.

== Honours ==
=== Clubs ===
- CSV South American Club Championship
  - Montes Claros 2017 – with Bolívar Vóley
- National championships
  - 2014/2015 Argentine Cup, with Bolívar Vóley
  - 2016/2017 Argentine Championship, with Bolívar Vóley
  - 2018/2019 Argentine Championship, with Bolívar Vóley

=== Youth national team ===
- 2006 CSV U19 South American Championship
- 2008 CSV U21 South American Championship
- 2008 CSV U19 South American Championship

=== Individual awards ===
- 2016: FIVB Club World Championship – Best Middle Blocker
- 2017: CSV South American Club Championship – Best Middle Blocker
- 2017: Pan American Cup – Best Middle Blocker
