= Lomas Vóley =

Argentine volleyball club

- Full name: Lomas Vóley
- Nickname: Lomas
- Founded: November 28, 2013; 12 years ago
- Ground: Microestadio Lomas de Zamora (Capacity: 4,500)
- Chairman: Gustavo Pan
- Manager: Marcelo Silva
- League: Liga Argentina de Voleibol
- 2016-17: 3rd (bronze)
- Website: Club home page

Uniforms
Home	Away

Lomas Vóley is an Argentine volleyball club based in Lomas de Zamora. The club was founded in 2013 and takes part of Liga Argentina de Voleibol – Serie A1, the top level of the Argentine men's volleyball league system, since 2013–14 season, when it was runner-up

== Titles ==
=== Domestic ===
- Liga Argentina A1
  - Runner-up (1):2013–14
  - Bronze (2):2015–16, 2016–17
- Copa ACLAV
  - First Place (1): 2016
- Copa Máster
  - Runner-up (2): 2016, 2017

=== International ===
- Men's South American Volleyball Club Championship
  - Runner-up (1): 2018
- Men's South American Volleyball Club Championship
  - Bronze (1): 2015
