= 2021 Men's South American Volleyball Championship =

2021 Men's South American Championship
Tournament details
- Host country: Brazil
- Dates: 1–5 September
- Teams: 5 (from 1 confederation)
- Venue: 1 (in 1 host city)

Final positions
- Champions: Brazil (33rd title)
- Runners-up: Argentina
- Third place: Chile
- Fourth place: Colombia

Tournament awards
- MVP: (Brazil) Bruno Rezende
- Best Setter: (Brazil) Bruno Rezende
- Best OH: (Brazil) Ricardo Lucarelli (Chile) Vicente Parraguirre
- Best MB: (Argentina) Agustín Loser (Argentina) Martín Ramos
- Best OPP: (Colombia) Liberman Agámez
- Best Libero: (Argentina) Santiago Danani

The 2021 Men's South American Volleyball Championship was the 34th edition of the Men's South American Volleyball Championship, organised by South America's governing volleyball body, the Confederación Sudamericana de Voleibol (CSV). The tournament was held in Brasília, Brazil from 1 to 5 September 2021. The champions and runners up, qualified for the 2022 FIVB Volleyball Men's World Championship.

== Teams ==
The tournament was held with 5 teams, after the withdrawal of Venezuela due to COVID-19 pandemic issues.

Country	Previous appearances			FIVB Ranking*
Country	Total	First	Last	FIVB Ranking*
Brazil (Hosts)	32	1951	2019	1
Argentina	31	1951	2019	5
Chile	24	1956	2019	28
Colombia	16	1961	2019	35
Peru	17	1951	2019	50

*As of 1 September 2021.

== Venues ==
All Matches
Brasília, Brazil
Nilson Nelson Gymnasium
Capacity: 16.000*

* The matches were held without public due to COVID-19 pandemic restrictions.

== Pool standing procedure ==
1. Number of matches won
2. Match points
3. Sets ratio
4. Points ratio
5. If the tie continues as per the point ratio between two teams, the priority will be given to the team which won the last match between them. When the tie in points ratio is between three or more teams, a new classification of these teams in the terms of points 1, 2 and 3 will be made taking into consideration only the matches in which they were opposed to each other.

Match won 3–0 or 3–1: 3 match points for the winner, 0 match points for the loser
Match won 3–2: 2 match points for the winner, 1 match point for the loser

== Round robin ==
- All times are Brasília Time (UTC−03:00).

Pos	Team	Pld	W	L	Pts	SW	SL	SR	SPW	SPL	SPR
1	Brazil (H)	4	4	0	12	12	1	12.000	324	250	1.296
2	Argentina	4	3	1	9	10	4	2.500	325	292	1.113
3	Chile	4	2	2	6	7	7	1.000	315	308	1.023
4	Colombia	4	1	3	3	4	10	0.400	296	324	0.914
5	Peru	4	0	4	0	1	12	0.083	237	323	0.734

(H) Host

Date	Time		Score		Set 1	Set 2	Set 3	Set 4	Set 5	Total	Report
1 Sep	16:30	Argentina	3–0	Colombia	25–20	25–19	25–17			75–56	Result
1 Sep	19:00	Peru	0–3	Brazil	12–25	19–25	18–25			49–75	Result
2 Sep	16:30	Chile	3–0	Peru	25–23	25–22	25–13			75–58	Result
2 Sep	19:00	Brazil	3–0	Colombia	25–20	25–22	25–21			75–63	Result
3 Sep	16:30	Peru	0–3	Argentina	20–25	21–25	12–25			53–75	Result
3 Sep	19:00	Chile	0–3	Brazil	22–25	18–25	19–25			59–75	Result
4 Sep	10:00	Argentina	3–1	Chile	25–16	21–25	25–21	25–22		96–84	Result
4 Sep	13:00	Colombia	3–1	Peru	25–21	25–17	23–25	25–15		98–78	Result
5 Sep	10:00	Brazil	3–1	Argentina	25–17	24–26	25–18	25–18		99–79	Result
5 Sep	13:00	Colombia	1–3	Chile	25–22	17–25	22–25	15–25		79–97	Result

== Final standing ==
Rank	Team
1st place, gold medalist(s)	Brazil
2nd place, silver medalist(s)	Argentina
3rd place, bronze medalist(s)	Chile
4	Colombia
5	Peru

Qualified for the 2022 World Championship

2021 Men's South American Champions

Brazil
33rd title

14–man roster
Bruno Rezende (c), João Rafael Ferreira, Fernando Kreling, Aboubacar Neto, Cledenilson Batista, Adriano Xavier, Isac Santos, Gabriel Vaccari, Maique Nascimento, Lucas Saatkamp, Thales Hoss, Ricardo Lucarelli, Alan Souza, Flávio Gualberto,
Head coach
Renan Dal Zotto

== Awards ==
- Most valuable player
  (Brazil) Bruno Rezende
- Best setter
  (Brazil) Bruno Rezende
- Best outside spikers
  (Brazil) Ricardo Lucarelli
  (Chile) Vicente Parraguirre
- Best middle blockers
  (Argentina) Agustín Loser
  (Argentina) Martín Ramos
- Best opposite spiker
  (Colombia) Liberman Agámez
- Best libero
  (Argentina) Santiago Danani

== See also ==
- South American Women's Volleyball Championship
- Men's U23 South American Volleyball Championship
- Men's Junior South American Volleyball Championship
- Boys' Youth South American Volleyball Championship
- Boys' U17 South American Volleyball Championship
- Volleyball at the Pan American Games
- Men's Pan-American Volleyball Cup
- Women's Pan-American Volleyball Cup
