= 2018 Men's South American Volleyball Club Championship =

2018 Men's South American Club Championship
Tournament details
- Host country: Brazil
- Dates: 27 February to 3 March
- Teams: 6
- Venue: 1 (in 1 host city)

Final positions
- Champions: (Brazil) Sada Cruzeiro (5th title)

Tournament awards
- MVP: (Cuba) Robertlandy Simón

The 2018 Men's South American Volleyball Club Championship is the tenth official edition of the men's volleyball tournament, played by seven teams from 27 February to 3 March 2018, second time in Montes Claros, Minas Gerais, Brazil. Sada Cruzeiro won its third consecutive title, the fifth overall, and qualified for the 2018 FIVB Volleyball Men's Club World Championship in Poland. Robertlandy Simón was elected the Most Valuable Player.

== Pools composition ==
Pool A	Pool B
(Brazil) Montes Claros Vôlei (Brazil) Sada Cruzeiro (Peru) Club Peerless	(Argentina) Personal Bolívar (Argentina) Lomas Vóley (Chile) St. Thomas Morus

== Preliminary round ==
- All times are Brasília Time (UTC−03:00).

=== Pool A ===
Pos	Team	Pld	W	L	Pts	SW	SL	SR	SPW	SPL	SPR	Qualification
1	(Brazil) Sada Cruzeiro	2	2	0	6	6	1	6.000	169	136	1.243	Semifinals
2	(Brazil) Montes Claros Vôlei	2	1	1	3	3	3	1.000	134	123	1.089	Semifinals
3	(Peru) Club Peerless	2	0	2	0	1	6	0.167	125	169	0.740	5th place match

Date	Time		Score		Set 1	Set 2	Set 3	Set 4	Set 5	Total
27 Feb	20:30	Montes Claros Vôlei (Brazil)	3–0	(Peru) Club Peerless	25–15	25–15	25–18			75–48
28 Feb	20:30	Montes Claros Vôlei (Brazil)	0–3	(Brazil) Sada Cruzeiro	22–25	15–25	22–25			59–75
1 Mar	18:30	Sada Cruzeiro (Brazil)	3–1	(Peru) Club Peerless	25–18	19–25	25–15	25–19		94–77

=== Pool B ===
Pos	Team	Pld	W	L	Pts	SW	SL	SR	SPW	SPL	SPR	Qualification
1	(Argentina) Lomas Vóley	2	2	0	5	6	2	3.000	189	169	1.118	Semifinals
2	(Argentina) Personal Bolívar	2	1	1	4	5	3	1.667	182	177	1.028	Semifinals
3	(Chile) St. Thomas Morus	2	0	2	0	0	6	0.000	126	151	0.834	5th place match

Date	Time		Score		Set 1	Set 2	Set 3	Set 4	Set 5	Total
27 Feb	18:30	Personal Bolívar (Argentina)	3–0	(Chile) St. Thomas Morus	25–23	25–16	26–24			76–63
28 Feb	18:30	Lomas Vóley (Argentina)	3–0	(Chile) St. Thomas Morus	25–19	25–21	25–23			75–63
1 Mar	18:30	Personal Bolívar (Argentina)	2–3	(Argentina) Lomas Vóley	20–25	28–26	25–23	21–25	12–15	106–114

== Final round ==
=== Bracket ===
Semifinals
2 March
(Brazil) Sada Cruzeiro	3
(Argentina) Personal Bolívar	0
2 March
(Argentina) Lomas Vóley	3
(Brazil) Montes Claros Vôlei	1

Final
3 March
(Brazil) Sada Cruzeiro	3
(Argentina) Lomas Vóley	0
3rd place
3 March
(Argentina) Personal Bolívar	1
(Brazil) Montes Claros Vôlei	3

=== Fifth place match ===
Date	Time		Score		Set 1	Set 2	Set 3	Set 4	Set 5	Total
2 Mar	18:30	Club Peerless (Peru)	3–1	(Chile) St. Thomas Morus	19–25	25–21	25–23	25–23		94–92

=== Semifinals ===
Date	Time		Score		Set 1	Set 2	Set 3	Set 4	Set 5	Total
2 Mar	18:30	Sada Cruzeiro (Brazil)	3–0	(Argentina) Personal Bolívar	25–19	33–31	25–16			83–66
2 Mar	20:30	Lomas Vóley (Argentina)	3–1	(Brazil) Montes Claros Vôlei	25–21	25–15	21–25	25–22		96–83

=== Third place match ===
Date	Time		Score		Set 1	Set 2	Set 3	Set 4	Set 5	Total
3 Mar	18:30	Personal Bolívar (Argentina)	1–3	(Brazil) Montes Claros Vôlei	28–26	23–25	23–25	15–25		89–101

=== Final ===
Date	Time		Score		Set 1	Set 2	Set 3	Set 4	Set 5	Total
3 Mar	21:30	Sada Cruzeiro (Brazil)	3–0	(Argentina) Lomas Vóley	25–19	25–18	25–20			75–57

== Final standing ==
Rank	Team
1st place, gold medalist(s)	(Brazil) Sada Cruzeiro
2nd place, silver medalist(s)	(Argentina) Lomas Vóley
3rd place, bronze medalist(s)	(Brazil) Montes Claros Vôlei
4	(Argentina) Personal Bolívar
5	(Peru) Club Peerless
6	(Chile) St. Thomas Morus

Qualified for the 2018 Club World Championship

2018 Men's South American Volleyball Club Champions

5th title

== All-Star team ==
- Most valuable player
  - (Cuba) Robertlandy Simón (Sada Cruzeiro)
- Best Opposite
  - (Brazil) Fabrício Dias (Montes Claros Vôlei)
- Best Outside Hitters
  - (Brazil) Yoandy Leal (Sada Cruzeiro)
  - (Argentina) Lucas Ocampo (Lomas Vóley)
- Best setter
  - (Argentina) Nicolás Uriarte (Sada Cruzeiro)
- Best Middle Blockers
  - (Brazil) Isac Santos (Sada Cruzeiro)
  - (Brazil) Jonadabe Carneiro (Lomas Vóley)
- Best libero
  - (Brazil) Sérgio Nogueira (Sada Cruzeiro)

== See also ==
- 2018 Women's South American Volleyball Club Championship
