= 2015 Men's South American Volleyball Club Championship =

2015 Men's South American Club Championship
Tournament details
- Host country: Argentina
- Dates: 11–15 February
- Teams: 7
- Venue: 1 (in 1 host city)

Final positions
- Champions: (Argentina) UPCN San Juan (2nd title)

Tournament awards
- MVP: (Bulgaria) Nikolay Uchikov (UPC)

The 2015 Men's South American Volleyball Club Championship was the seventh official edition of the tournament. Seven teams competed in tournament, held from 11 to 15 February 2015 in San Juan, Argentina. The winning team qualified for the 2015 Club World Championship.

== Pools composition ==
Pool A	Pool B
(Argentina) UPCN San Juan	(Brazil) Sada Cruzeiro
(Argentina) Lomas	(Brazil) Funvic Taubaté
(Chile) Club Linares	(Uruguay) Atlético Bohemios
	(Bolivia) San Martin

== Venue ==
- Estadio Aldo Cantoni, San Juan, Argentina

== Preliminary round ==
- All times are Argentina Time (UTC−03:00).

=== Pool A ===
Pos	Team	Pld	W	L	Pts	SW	SL	SR	SPW	SPL	SPR	Qualification
1	(Argentina) UPCN San Juan	2	2	0	6	6	0	MAX	155	114	1.360	Semifinals
2	(Argentina) Lomas	1	1	0	3	3	3	1.000	133	131	1.015	Semifinals
3	(Chile) Club Linares	2	0	2	0	0	6	0.000	109	152	0.717	5th place match

Date	Time		Score		Set 1	Set 2	Set 3	Set 4	Set 5	Total
11 Feb	22:00	UPCN San Juan (Argentina)	3–0	(Chile) Club Linares	25–11	27–25	25–20			77–56
12 Feb	22:00	UPCN San Juan (Argentina)	3–0	(Argentina) Lomas	25–13	25–19	28–26			78–58
13 Feb	17:00	Lomas (Argentina)	3–0	(Chile) Club Linares	25–18	25–18	25–17			75–53

=== Pool B ===
Pos	Team	Pld	W	L	Pts	SW	SL	SR	SPW	SPL	SPR	Qualification
1	(Brazil) Sada Cruzeiro	3	3	0	9	9	0	MAX	225	128	1.758	Semifinals
2	(Brazil) Funvic Taubaté	3	2	1	6	6	3	2.000	216	140	1.543	Semifinals
3	(Uruguay) Atlético Bohemios	3	1	2	3	3	6	0.500	153	199	0.769	5th place match
4	(Bolivia) San Martin	3	0	3	0	0	9	0.000	98	225	0.436	

Date	Time		Score		Set 1	Set 2	Set 3	Set 4	Set 5	Total
11 Feb	17:00	Funvic Taubaté (Brazil)	3–0	(Uruguay) Atlético Bohemios	25–14	25–18	25–11			75–43
11 Feb	19:30	Sada Cruzeiro (Brazil)	3–0	(Bolivia) San Martin	25–5	25–14	25–8			75–27
12 Feb	17:00	San Martin (Bolivia)	0–3	(Uruguay) Atlético Bohemios	14–25	17–25	18–25			49–75
12 Feb	19:30	Sada Cruzeiro (Brazil)	3–0	(Brazil) Funvic Taubaté	25–21	25–23	25–22			75–66
13 Feb	19:30	Atlético Bohemios (Uruguay)	0–3	(Brazil) Sada Cruzeiro	11–25	9–25	15–25			35–75
13 Feb	22:00	Funvic Taubaté (Brazil)	3–0	(Bolivia) San Martin	25–5	25–6	25–11			75–22

== Final round ==
- All times are Argentina Time (UTC−03:00).

=== 5th–6th places ===
==== 5th place match ====
Date	Time		Score		Set 1	Set 2	Set 3	Set 4	Set 5	Total
14 Feb	17:30	Club Linares (Chile)	3–1	(Uruguay) Atlético Bohemios	34–32	25–19	22–25	25–13		106–89

=== 1st–4th places ===
Semifinals
14 February
(Argentina) UPCN San Juan	3
(Brazil) Funvic Taubaté	2
14 February
(Brazil) Sada Cruzeiro	3
(Argentina) Lomas	0

Final
15 February
(Argentina) UPCN San Juan	3
(Brazil) Sada Cruzeiro	2
3rd place match
15 February
(Brazil) Funvic Taubaté	1
(Argentina) Lomas	3

==== Semifinals ====
Date	Time		Score		Set 1	Set 2	Set 3	Set 4	Set 5	Total
14 Feb	19:30	Sada Cruzeiro (Brazil)	3–0	(Argentina) Lomas	25–17	25–15	25–18			75–50
14 Feb	21:30	UPCN San Juan (Argentina)	3–2	(Brazil) Funvic Taubaté	13–25	29–27	25–23	22–25	15–10	104–110

==== 3rd place match ====
Date	Time		Score		Set 1	Set 2	Set 3	Set 4	Set 5	Total
15 Feb	19:00	Funvic Taubaté (Brazil)	1–3	(Argentina) Lomas	19–25	25–22	23–25	23–25		90–97

==== Final ====
Date	Time		Score		Set 1	Set 2	Set 3	Set 4	Set 5	Total
15 Feb	21:00	UPCN San Juan (Argentina)	3–2	(Brazil) Sada Cruzeiro	25–21	25–18	17–25	21–25	16–14	104–103

== Final standing ==
Rank	Team
1st place, gold medalist(s)	(Argentina) UPCN San Juan
2nd place, silver medalist(s)	(Brazil) Sada Cruzeiro
3rd place, bronze medalist(s)	(Argentina) Lomas
4	(Brazil) Funvic Taubaté
5	(Chile) Club Linares
6	(Uruguay) Atlético Bohemios
7	(Bolivia) San Martin

Qualified for the 2015 Club World Championship
Qualified as hosts for the 2015 Club World Championship

2015 Men's South American Club Champions

2nd title

== Awards ==
- Most valuable player
  (Bulgaria) Nikolay Uchikov (UPCN San Juan)
- Best setter
  (Argentina) Demián González (UPCN San Juan)
- Best outside spikers
  (Cuba) Yoandry Leal (Sada Cruzeiro)
  (Argentina) Lucas Ocampo (Lomas)
- Best middle blockers
  (Argentina) Martín Ramos (UPCN San Juan)
  (Argentina) Facundo Imhoff (Lomas)
- Best opposite spiker
  (Brazil) Wallace de Souza (Sada Cruzeiro)
- Best libero
  (Brazil) Sérgio Nogueira (Sada Cruzeiro)
