= Sebastián Garrocq =

Argentine volleyball player (born 1979)

Personal information
- Nationality: Argentine
- Born: 27 November 1979 (age 46)
- Height: 1.70 m (5 ft 7 in)
- Weight: 63 kg (139 lb)
- Spike: 320 cm (126 in)
- Block: 302 cm (119 in)

Volleyball information
- Number: 4

Career
Years	Teams
2014	(Argentina) UPCN San Juan

National team
2014	Argentina

Sebastián Garrocq (born 27 November 1979) is an Argentine male volleyball player. He was part of the Argentina men's national volleyball team at the 2014 FIVB Volleyball Men's World Championship in Poland. He played with UPCN San Juan.

== Clubs ==
- UPCN San Juan (2014)
