= 2013 Men's South American Volleyball Club Championship =

Tournament details
- Host country: Brazil
- Dates: 8–12 May
- Teams: 7
- Venue: Vivo Arena (in Belo Horizonte host cities)

Final positions
- Champions: (Argentina) UPCN San Juan (1st title)

Tournament awards
- MVP: (Argentina) Demián González (UPC)

The 2013 Men's South American Volleyball Club Championship was the fifth official edition of the men's volleyball tournament, played by seven teams over 8–12 May 2013 in Vivo Arena in Belo Horizonte, Brazil. The winning team qualified for the 2013 FIVB Volleyball Men's Club World Championship.

== Pools composition ==
Pool A	Pool B
(Brazil) Vivo Minas (Argentina) UPCN San Juan (Peru) Club Peerless	(Brazil) RJX (Argentina) Club Buenos Aires Unidos (Venezuela) Vikingos de Miranda (Uruguay) Carmelo Rowing Club

== Preliminary round ==
=== Pool A ===
Pos	Team	Pld	W	L	Pts	SW	SL	SR	SPW	SPL	SPR	Qualification
1	(Brazil) Vivo Minas	2	2	0	6	6	1	6.000	171	122	1.402	Semifinals
2	(Argentina) UPCN San Juan	2	1	1	3	4	3	1.333	150	147	1.020	Semifinals
3	(Peru) Club Peerless	2	0	2	0	0	6	0.000	98	150	0.653	

Date		Score		Set 1	Set 2	Set 3	Set 4	Set 5	Total
08 May	Vivo Minas (Brazil)	3–0	(Peru) Club Peerless	25–15	25–21	25–11			75–47
09 May	Vivo Minas (Brazil)	3–1	(Argentina) UPCN San Juan	25–13	21–25	25–14	25–23		96–75
10 May	Club Peerless (Peru)	0–3	(Argentina) UPCN San Juan	17–25	22–25	12–25			51–75

=== Pool B ===
Pos	Team	Pld	W	L	Pts	SW	SL	SR	SPW	SPL	SPR	Qualification
1	(Argentina) Club Buenos Aires Unidos	3	3	0	9	9	2	4.500	265	210	1.262	Semifinals
2	(Brazil) RJX	3	2	1	6	7	3	2.333	238	187	1.273	Semifinals
3	(Venezuela) Vikingos de Miranda	3	1	2	3	4	6	0.667	214	222	0.964	
4	(Uruguay) Carmelo Rowing Club	3	0	3	0	0	9	0.000	127	225	0.564	

Date		Score		Set 1	Set 2	Set 3	Set 4	Set 5	Total
08 May	Buenos Aires Unidos (Argentina)	3–1	(Venezuela) Vikingos de Miranda	25–22	20–25	25–15	25–20		95–82
08 May	RJX (Brazil)	3–0	(Uruguay) Carmelo Rowing Club	25–7	25–21	25–7			75–35
09 May	Carmelo Rowing Club (Uruguay)	0–3	(Argentina) Buenos Aires Unidos	12–25	15–25	14–25			41–75
09 May	RJX (Brazil)	3–0	(Venezuela) Vikingos de Miranda	25–17	26–24	25–16			76–57
10 May	Vikingos de Miranda (Venezuela)	3–0	(Uruguay) Carmelo Rowing Club	25–23	25–14	25–14			75–51
10 May	RJX (Brazil)	1–3	(Argentina) Buenos Aires Unidos	25–20	23–25	19–25	20–25		87–95

== Final round ==
Semifinals
Belo Horizonte
(Argentina) UPCN San Juan	3
(Argentina) Buenos Aires Unidos	1
Belo Horizonte
(Brazil) Vivo Minas	3
(Brazil) RJX	0

Final
Belo Horizonte
(Argentina) UPCN San Juan	3
(Brazil) Vivo Minas	0
Third place
Belo Horizonte
(Argentina) Buenos Aires Unidos	0
(Brazil) RJX	3

=== Semifinals ===
Date		Score		Set 1	Set 2	Set 3	Set 4	Set 5	Total
11 May	UPCN San Juan (Argentina)	3–1	(Argentina) Buenos Aires Unidos	25–23	26–24	21–25	25–20		97–92
11 May	Vivo Minas (Brazil)	3–0	(Brazil) RJX	27–25	25–17	25–20			77–62

=== 5th place match ===
Date		Score		Set 1	Set 2	Set 3	Set 4	Set 5	Total
11 May	Club Peerless (Peru)	0–3	(Venezuela) Vikingos de Miranda	25–27	22–25	15–25			62–77

=== 3rd place match ===
Date		Score		Set 1	Set 2	Set 3	Set 4	Set 5	Total
12 May	Buenos Aires Unidos (Argentina)	0–3	(Brazil) RJX	19–25	20–25	18–25			57–75

=== Final ===
Date		Score		Set 1	Set 2	Set 3	Set 4	Set 5	Total
12 May	UPCN San Juan (Argentina)	3–0	(Brazil) Vivo Minas	30–28	25–17	30–28			85–73

== Final standing ==
Rank	Team
1st place, gold medalist(s)	(Argentina) UPCN San Juan
2nd place, silver medalist(s)	(Brazil) Vivo Minas
3rd place, bronze medalist(s)	(Brazil) RJX
4	(Argentina) Buenos Aires Unidos
5	(Venezuela) Vikingos de Miranda
6	(Peru) Club Peerless
7	(Uruguay) Carmelo Rowing Club

Qualified for the 2013 Club World Championship

2013 Men's South American Club Champions

1st title
