= Felipe Lourenço da Silva =

Brazilian volleyball player (born 1990)

Felipe Silva

Personal information
- Full name: Felipe Lourenço da Silva
- Born: 25 August 1990 (age 36); São Paulo, Brazil
- Height: 1.88 m (6 ft 2 in)
- Weight: 77 kg (170 lb)
- Spike: 302 cm (119 in)
- Block: 297 cm (117 in)

Volleyball information
- Position: Libero
- Current club: Minas Tênis Clube

Career
Years	Teams
2008–2010	Esporte Clube Pinheiros
2011–2014	São Bernardo Vôlei
2014–2016	Funvic Taubaté
2016–2017	Maringá Vôlei
2017–2018	Corinthians-Guarulhos
2018–2019	Anápolis Vôlei
2019–	Minas Tênis Clube

National team
2014	Brazil
Honours
Men's volleyball
Representing Brazil
World League
Silver medal – second place	2014 Florence

Felipe Lourenço da Silva (born 25 August 1990) is a Brazilian male volleyball player. He was part of the Brazil men's national volleyball team at the 2014 FIVB Volleyball Men's World Championship in Poland. He played for São Bernardo Vôlei.

== Sporting achievements ==
=== Clubs ===
==== South American Club Championship ====
- 2016 – with Funvic Taubaté

=== National team ===
- 2014 FIVB World League

=== Individual ===
- 2016 South American Club Championship – Best Libero
