= 2023 Men's South American Volleyball Championship =

Tournament details
- Host country: Brazil
- City: Recife
- Dates: 26–30 August
- Teams: 5
- Venue: 1 (in 1 host city)

Final positions
- Champions: Argentina (2nd title)
- Runners-up: Brazil
- Third place: Colombia
- Fourth place: Chile

Tournament awards
- MVP: (Argentina) Luciano Vicentín
- Best Setter: (Argentina) Luciano De Cecco
- Best OH: (Brazil) Ricardo Lucarelli (Chile) Vicente Parraguirre
- Best MB: (Argentina) Nicolás Zerba (Colombia) Daniel Aponza
- Best OPP: (Brazil) Alan Souza
- Best Libero: (Brazil) Thales Hoss

The 2023 Men's South American Volleyball Championship was the 35th edition of the Men's South American Volleyball Championship held in Recife, Brazil and organised by South America's governing volleyball body, the Confederación Sudamericana de Voleibol (CSV). Top three of the tournament qualified for the 2025 FIVB Volleyball Men's World Championship as the CSV representatives.

Argentina won the championship for the second time in the tournament's 72-year history. Brazil had previously won all South American championships with the exception of the 1964 edition, in which it did not participate in due political turmoil in the country.

== Competing nations ==
The following national teams participated:

- Argentina
- Brazil (Hosts)
- Chile
- Colombia
- Peru

== Venues ==
All Matches
Recife, Brazil
Ginásio de Esportes Geraldo Magalhães
Capacity: 15,000

== Pool standing procedure ==
1. Number of matches won
2. Match points
3. Sets ratio
4. Points ratio
5. If the tie continues as per the point ratio between two teams, the priority will be given to the team which won the last match between them. When the tie in points ratio is between three or more teams, a new classification of these teams in the terms of points 1, 2 and 3 will be made taking into consideration only the matches in which they were opposed to each other.

Match won 3–0 or 3–1: 3 match points for the winner, 0 match points for the loser
Match won 3–2: 2 match points for the winner, 1 match point for the loser

== Round robin ==
- All times are Brasília Time (UTC−03:00).

Pos	Team	Pld	W	L	Pts	SW	SL	SR	SPW	SPL	SPR
1	Argentina	4	4	0	12	12	1	12.000	322	241	1.336
2	Brazil (H)	4	3	1	9	9	3	3.000	292	230	1.270
3	Colombia	4	2	2	5	6	9	0.667	302	344	0.878
4	Chile	4	1	3	4	5	10	0.500	316	332	0.952
5	Peru	4	0	4	0	3	12	0.250	277	362	0.765

Source: FIVB Live Center
(H) Host

Date	Time		Score		Set 1	Set 2	Set 3	Set 4	Set 5	Total	Report
26 Aug	18:00	Argentina	3–0	Colombia	25–16	25–15	25–22			75–53	Report
26 Aug	20:30	Brazil	3–0	Peru	25–18	25–18	25–11			75–47	Report
27 Aug	17:00	Peru	1–3	Colombia	25–19	19–25	17–25	22–25		83–94	Report
27 Aug	19:30	Brazil	3–0	Chile	25–17	25–18	25–19			75–54	Report
28 Aug	18:00	Chile	0–3	Argentina	19–25	20–25	15–25			54–75	Report
28 Aug	20:30	Colombia	0–3	Brazil	15–25	24–26	13–25			52–76	Report
29 Aug	18:00	Peru	1–3	Argentina	16–25	25–20	9–25	18–25		68–95	Report
29 Aug	20:30	Colombia	3–2	Chile	20–25	27–25	16–25	25–23	15–12	103–110	Report
30 Aug	18:00	Chile	3–1	Peru	25–17	23–25	25–16	25–21		98–79	Report
30 Aug	20:30	Brazil	0–3	Argentina	19–25	27–29	22–25			68–79	Report

== Final standing ==
Rank	Team
1st place, gold medalist(s)	Argentina
2nd place, silver medalist(s)	Brazil
3rd place, bronze medalist(s)	Colombia
4	Chile
5	Peru

Qualified for the 2025 World Championship
Qualified for the 2025 World Championship via FIVB World Ranking

2023 Men's South American Champions

Argentina
2nd title

14–man roster
Matías Sánchez, Jan Martínez Franchi, Joaquin Gallego, Facundo Conte, Agustín Loser, Santiago Danani, Manuel Armoa, Bruno Lima, Ezequiel Palacios, Luciano De Cecco, Pablo Koukartsev, Luciano Vicentín, Martín Ramos, Nicolás Zerba
Head coach
Marcelo Méndez

== Awards ==
- Most valuable player
  (Argentina) Luciano Vicentín
- Best setter
  (Argentina) Luciano De Cecco
- Best outside spikers
  (Brazil) Ricardo Lucarelli
  (Chile) Vicente Parraguirre
- Best middle blockers
  (Argentina) Nicolás Zerba
  (Colombia) Daniel Aponza
- Best opposite spiker
  (Brazil) Alan Souza
- Best libero
  (Brazil) Thales Hoss

== See also ==
- South American Women's Volleyball Championship
- Men's U23 South American Volleyball Championship
- Men's Junior South American Volleyball Championship
- Boys' Youth South American Volleyball Championship
- Boys' U17 South American Volleyball Championship
- Volleyball at the Pan American Games
- Men's Pan-American Volleyball Cup
- Women's Pan-American Volleyball Cup
