= 1951 Men's South American Volleyball Championship =

The 1951 Men's South American Volleyball Championship, the 1st tournament, took place in 1951 in Rio de Janeiro, Brazil.

== Final positions ==
Place	Team
	Brazil
	Paraguay
	Uruguay
4	Argentina

Source: Todor66.com
