= 2012 Men's South American Volleyball Club Championship =

Tournament details
- Host country: Chile
- Dates: 5–9 September
- Teams: 8
- Venue: Ignacio Carrera Pinto Gymnassium (in Linares host cities)

Final positions
- Champions: (Brazil) Sada Cruzeiro (1st title)

Tournament awards
- MVP: (Brazil) Evandro Guerra (UPC)

The 2012 Men's South American Volleyball Club Championship was the fourth official edition of the men's volleyball tournament, played by eight teams over 5–9 August 2012 in Ignacio Carrera Pinto Gymnassium in Linares, Chile. The winning team qualified for the 2012 FIVB Volleyball Men's Club World Championship.

== Pools composition ==
Teams were seeded according to how the country representing finished in the last tournament.

Pool A	Pool B
(Chile) Club Linares (Host & 3rd) (Peru) Club Peerless (4th) (Bolivia) Universidad de la Salle (5th) (Venezuela) Huracanes de Bolivar	(Brazil) Sada Cruzeiro (1st) (Argentina) UPCN San Juan (2nd) (Paraguay) Club Deportivo Colón (Uruguay) Carmelo Rowing Club

== Preliminary round ==
Qualified for the semifinals

=== Pool A ===
Pos	Team	Pld	W	L	Pts	SPW	SPL	SPR	SW	SL	SR	Qualification
1	(Venezuela) Huracanes de Bolivar	3	3	0	9	274	186	1.473	9	2	4.500	Semifinals
2	(Chile) Club Linares	3	2	1	6	230	219	1.050	7	4	1.750	Semifinals
3	(Bolivia) Universidad de la Salle	3	1	2	2	200	249	0.803	3	8	0.375	
4	(Peru) Club Peerless	3	0	3	1	235	200	1.175	4	9	0.444	

Date		Score		Set 1	Set 2	Set 3	Set 4	Set 5	Total
05 Sep	Club Peerless (Peru)	1–3	(Venezuela) Huracanes de Bolivar	25–23	17–25	16–25	8–25		66–98
05 Sep	Club Linares (Chile)	3–0	(Bolivia) Universidad de la Salle	25–11	25–19	25–18			75–48
06 Sep	Huracanes de Bolivar (Venezuela)	3–0	(Bolivia) Universidad de la Salle	25–16	25–16	25–12			75–44
06 Sep	Club Linares (Chile)	3–1	(Peru) Club Peerless	25–18	25–9	19–25	25–18		94–70
07 Sep	Club Peerless (Peru)	2–3	(Bolivia) Universidad de la Salle	25–22	25–21	16–25	20–25	13–15	99–108
07 Sep	Club Linares (Chile)	1–3	(Venezuela) Huracanes de Bolivar	28–26	23–25	14–25	21–25		86–101

=== Pool B ===
Pos	Team	Pld	W	L	Pts	SPW	SPL	SPR	SW	SL	SR	Qualification
1	(Brazil) Sada Cruzeiro	3	3	0	9	225	136	1.654	9	0	MAX	Semifinals
2	(Argentina) UPCN San Juan	3	2	1	6	207	156	1.327	6	3	2.000	Semifinals
3	(Paraguay) Club Deportivo Colón	3	1	2	3	164	224	0.732	3	7	0.429	
4	(Uruguay) Carmelo Rowing Club	3	0	3	0	144	244	0.590	1	9	0.111	

Date		Score		Set 1	Set 2	Set 3	Set 4	Set 5	Total
05 Sep	UPCN San Juan (Argentina)	3–0	(Paraguay) Deportivo Colón	25–11	25–12	25–14			75–37
05 Sep	Sada Cruzeiro (Brazil)	3–0	(Uruguay) Carmelo Rowing Club	25–7	25–9	25–10			75–26
06 Sep	Sada Cruzeiro (Brazil)	3–0	(Paraguay) Deportivo Colón	25–22	25–18	25–13			75–53
06 Sep	UPCN San Juan (Argentina)	3–0	(Uruguay) Carmelo Rowing Club	25–14	25–16	25–14			75–44
07 Sep	Deportivo Colón (Paraguay)	3–1	(Uruguay) Carmelo Rowing Club	19–25	25–13	25–19	25–17		94–74
07 Sep	Sada Cruzeiro (Brazil)	3–0	(Argentina) UPCN San Juan	25–18	25–16	25–23			75–57

== Final round ==
Semifinals
Linares, Chile
(Venezuela) Huracanes de Bolivar	0
(Argentina) UPCN San Juan	3
Linares, Chile
(Brazil) Sada Cruzeiro	3
(Chile) Club Linares	0

Final
Linares, Chile
(Argentina) UPCN San Juan	1
(Brazil) Sada Cruzeiro	3
Third place
Linares, Chile
(Venezuela) Huracanes de Bolivar	3
(Chile) Club Linares	1

=== Semifinals ===
Date		Score		Set 1	Set 2	Set 3	Set 4	Set 5	Total
08 Sep	Huracanes de Bolivar (Venezuela)	0–3	(Argentina) UPCN San Juan	21–25	16–25	19–25			56–75
08 Sep	Sada Cruzeiro (Brazil)	3–0	(Chile) Club Linares	25–17	25–16	25–19			75–52

=== 7th place match ===
Date		Score		Set 1	Set 2	Set 3	Set 4	Set 5	Total
08 Sep	Carmelo Rowing Club (Uruguay)	0–3	(Peru) Club Peerless	24–26	23–25	14–25			61–76

=== 5th place match ===
Date		Score		Set 1	Set 2	Set 3	Set 4	Set 5	Total
08 Sep	Deportivo Colón (Paraguay)	3–0	(Bolivia) Universidad de la Salle	25–19	25–20	25–18			75–57

=== 3rd place match ===
Date		Score		Set 1	Set 2	Set 3	Set 4	Set 5	Total
09 Sep	Huracanes de Bolivar (Venezuela)	3–1	(Chile) Club Linares	25–20	25–14	20–25	25–17		95–76

=== Final ===
Date		Score		Set 1	Set 2	Set 3	Set 4	Set 5	Total
09 Sep	UPCN San Juan (Argentina)	1–3	(Brazil) Sada Cruzeiro	25–19	18–25	17–25	26–28		86–97

== Final standing ==
Rank	Team
1st place, gold medalist(s)	(Brazil) Sada Cruzeiro
2nd place, silver medalist(s)	(Argentina) UPCN San Juan
3rd place, bronze medalist(s)	(Venezuela) Huracanes de Bolivar
4	(Chile) Club Linares
5	(Paraguay) Deportivo Colón
6	(Bolivia) Universidad La Salle
7	(Peru) Club Peerless
8	(Uruguay) Carmelo Rowing Club

Qualified for the 2012 Club World Championship

2012 Men's South American Club Champions
