= Nikolay Uchikov =

Bulgarian volleyball player (born 1986)

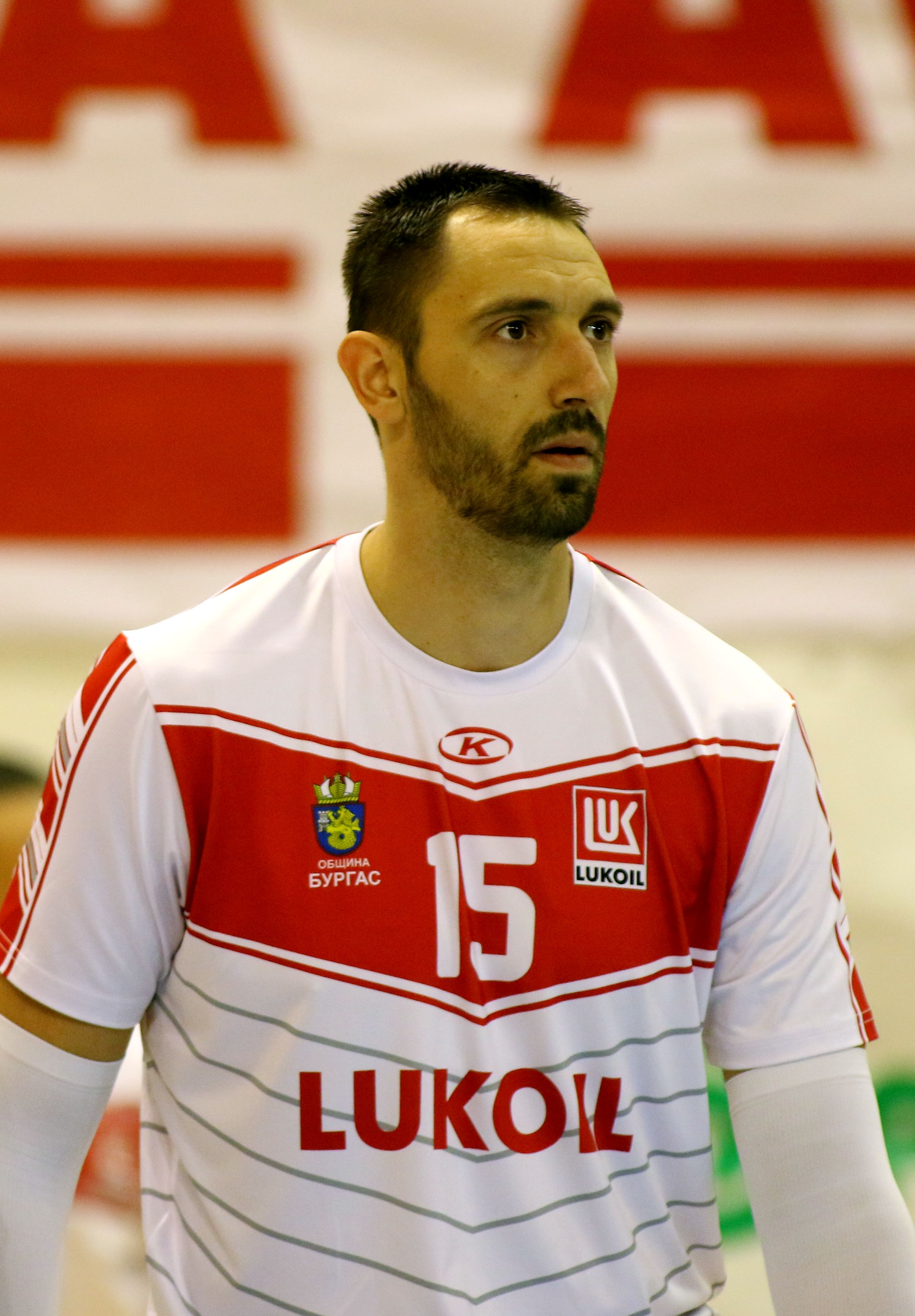

Personal information
- Nationality: Bulgarian
- Born: 13 April 1986 (age 40)
- Height: 207 cm (6 ft 9 in)
- Weight: 110 kg (243 lb)
- Spike: 355 cm (140 in)
- Block: 330 cm (130 in)

Career
Years	Teams
2003–2004	Lokomotiv Plovdiv
2004–2009	Levski Volley
2009–2010	Volley Cavriago
2010–2011	Pallavolo Padova
2011–2012	Pallavolo Molfetta
2012–2013	Trentino Volley
2013–2014	Volleyball Tjumen
2014–2017	UPCN Vóley Club
2017–2018	Neftochimic Burgas
2018	PAOK Thessaloniki
2018	UPCN Vóley Club
2019	Neftochimic Burgas
2019–2020	UPCN Vóley Club
2020–2021	Al-Wehda
2021–2022	Neftochimic Burgas
2022–2024	Deya Sport Burgas

National team
2008–2020	Bulgaria

Nikolay Uchikov (Bulgarian: Николай Учиков) (born 13 April 1986) is a Bulgarian former professional volleyball player. With his club Trentino Diatec he competed at the 2012 FIVB Volleyball Men's Club World Championship. He was part of the Bulgaria men's national volleyball team.

== Sporting achievements ==
=== Club ===
==== International competitions ====
- 2012 World Championship with Trentino
- 2014/2015 South American Championship with UPCN

==== National Championships ====
- 2004/2005 Bulgarian Championship with Levski Sofia
- 2005/2006 Bulgarian Championship with Levski Sofia
- 2008/2009 Bulgarian Championship with Levski Sofia
- 2012/2013 Italian Championship with Trentino
- 2014/2015 Argentine Championship with UPCN
- 2015/2016 Argentine Championship with UPCN
- 2017/2018 Argentine Championship with UPCN
- 2018/2019 Bulgarian Championship with Neftochimic Burgas

==== National Cups ====
- 2004/2005 Bulgarian Cup, with Levski Sofia
- 2006/2007 Bulgarian Cup, with Levski Sofia
- 2012/2013 Italian Cup, with Trentino
- 2015/2016 Argentine Cup, with UPCN
- 2017/2018 Greek Cup, with PAOK
- 2017/2018 Bulgarian Cup, with Nefrochimic
- 2019/2020 Argentine Cup, with UPCN
- 2023/2024 Bulgarian Cup, with Deya Sport Burgas

==== National Super Cups ====
- 2014 Italian Super Cup, with Trentino
- 2016 Italian Super Cup, with Trentino
