= 2017 Men's South American Volleyball Club Championship =

2017 Men's South American Club Championship
Tournament details
- Host country: Brazil
- Dates: 21–25 February
- Teams: 7
- Venue: 1 (in 1 host city)

Final positions
- Champions: (Brazil) Sada Cruzeiro (4th title)

Tournament awards
- MVP: (Cuba) Yoandry Leal (Sada Cruzeiro)

The 2017 Men's South American Volleyball Club Championship was the ninth official edition of the men's volleyball tournament, played by seven teams from 21 to 25 February 2017 in Montes Claros, Minas Gerais, Brazil. Sada Cruzeiro won its second consecutive title, the fourth overall, and qualified for the 2017 FIVB Volleyball Men's Club World Championship in Poland. Yoandry Leal was elected the Most Valuable Player.

== Pools composition ==
Pool A	Pool B
(Brazil) Montes Claros Vôlei (Brazil) Sada Cruzeiro (French Guiana) ~~USL Montjoly~~ (withdrew) (Note: USL Montjoly withdrew from the competition due to financial problems.) (Uruguay) Bohemios	(Argentina) Personal Bolívar (Argentina) UPCN San Juan (Bolivia) San Martín (Peru) Unilever

== Preliminary round ==
- All times are Brasilia Time (UTC−03:00).

=== Pool A ===
Pos	Team	Pld	W	L	Pts	SW	SL	SR	SPW	SPL	SPR	Qualification
1	(Brazil) Sada Cruzeiro	2	2	0	6	6	0	MAX	150	99	1.515	Semifinals
2	(Brazil) Montes Claros Vôlei	2	1	1	3	3	3	1.000	134	120	1.117	Semifinals
3	(Uruguay) Bohemios	2	0	2	0	0	6	0.000	85	150	0.567	5th place match

Date	Time		Score		Set 1	Set 2	Set 3	Set 4	Set 5	Total
21 Feb	20:00	Montes Claros Vôlei (Brazil)	3–0	(Uruguay) Bohemios	25–15	25–9	25–21			75–45
22 Feb	20:00	Sada Cruzeiro (Brazil)	3–0	(Brazil) Montes Claros Vôlei	25–21	25–23	25–15			75–59
23 Feb	18:30	Sada Cruzeiro (Brazil)	3–0	(Uruguay) Bohemios	25–16	25–12	25–12			75–40

=== Pool B ===
Pos	Team	Pld	W	L	Pts	SW	SL	SR	SPW	SPL	SPR	Qualification
1	(Argentina) Personal Bolívar	3	3	0	9	9	0	MAX	225	154	1.461	Semifinals
2	(Argentina) UPCN San Juan	3	2	1	6	6	4	1.500	232	203	1.143	Semifinals
3	(Peru) Unilever	3	1	2	3	4	6	0.667	208	213	0.977	5th place match
4	(Bolivia) San Martín	3	0	3	0	0	9	0.000	130	225	0.578	

Date	Time		Score		Set 1	Set 2	Set 3	Set 4	Set 5	Total
21 Feb	17:00	Personal Bolívar (Argentina)	3–0	(Peru) Unilever	25–16	25–20	25–11			75–47
21 Feb	18:30	UPCN San Juan (Argentina)	3–0	(Bolivia) San Martín	25–13	25–19	25–10			75–42
22 Feb	17:00	Personal Bolívar (Argentina)	3–0	(Bolivia) San Martín	25–17	25–13	25–16			75–46
22 Feb	18:30	UPCN San Juan (Argentina)	3–1	(Peru) Unilever	21–25	25–20	25–21	25–20		96–86
23 Feb	17:00	Unilever (Peru)	3–0	(Bolivia) San Martín	25–13	25–13	25–16			75–42
23 Feb	20:00	UPCN San Juan (Argentina)	0–3	(Argentina) Personal Bolívar	19–25	23–25	19–25			61–75

== Final round ==
=== Bracket ===
Semifinals
24 February
(Brazil) Sada Cruzeiro	3
(Argentina) UPCN San Juan	0
24 February
(Argentina) Personal Bolívar	3
(Brazil) Montes Claros	2

Final
25 February
(Brazil) Sada Cruzeiro	3
(Argentina) Personal Bolívar	0
3rd place
25 February
(Argentina) UPCN San Juan	3
(Brazil) Montes Claros	0

=== Fifth place match ===
Date	Time		Score		Set 1	Set 2	Set 3	Set 4	Set 5	Total
24 Feb	17:00	Bohemios (Uruguay)	0–3	(Peru) Unilever	17–25	13–25	18–25			48–75

=== Semifinals ===
Date	Time		Score		Set 1	Set 2	Set 3	Set 4	Set 5	Total
24 Feb	19:00	Sada Cruzeiro (Brazil)	3–0	(Argentina) UPCN San Juan	25–21	25–19	25–23			75–63
24 Feb	21:00	Personal Bolívar (Argentina)	3–2	(Brazil) Montes Claros	28–26	25–21	23–25	24–26	15–10	115–108

=== Third place match ===
Date	Time		Score		Set 1	Set 2	Set 3	Set 4	Set 5	Total
25 Feb	14:30	UPCN San Juan (Argentina)	3–0	(Brazil) Montes Claros	25–22	25–19	25–23			75–64

=== Final ===
Date	Time		Score		Set 1	Set 2	Set 3	Set 4	Set 5	Total
25 Feb	17:30	Sada Cruzeiro (Brazil)	3–0	(Argentina) Personal Bolívar	26–24	25–23	25–23			76–70

== Final standing ==
Rank	Team
1st place, gold medalist(s)	(Brazil) Sada Cruzeiro
2nd place, silver medalist(s)	(Argentina) Personal Bolívar
3rd place, bronze medalist(s)	(Argentina) UPCN San Juan
4	(Brazil) Montes Claros
5	(Peru) Unilever
6	(Uruguay) Bohemios
7	(Bolivia) San Martín

Qualified for the 2017 Club World Championship

2017 Men's South American Volleyball Club Champions

4th title

== All-Star team ==
- Most valuable player
  - (Cuba) Yoandry Leal (Sada Cruzeiro)
- Best Opposite
  - (Australia) Thomas Edgar (Personal Bolívar)
- Best Outside Hitters
  - (Cuba) Yoandry Leal (Sada Cruzeiro)
  - (Brazil) Rodrigo Leão (Sada Cruzeiro)
- Best setter
  - (Brazil) William Arjona (Sada Cruzeiro)
- Best Middle Blockers
  - (Cuba) Robertlandy Simón (Sada Cruzeiro)
  - (Argentina) Pablo Crer (Personal Bolívar)
- Best libero
  - (Argentina) Alexis González (Personal Bolívar)

== See also ==
- 2017 Women's South American Volleyball Club Championship
