= Wallace de Souza =

Brazilian volleyball player

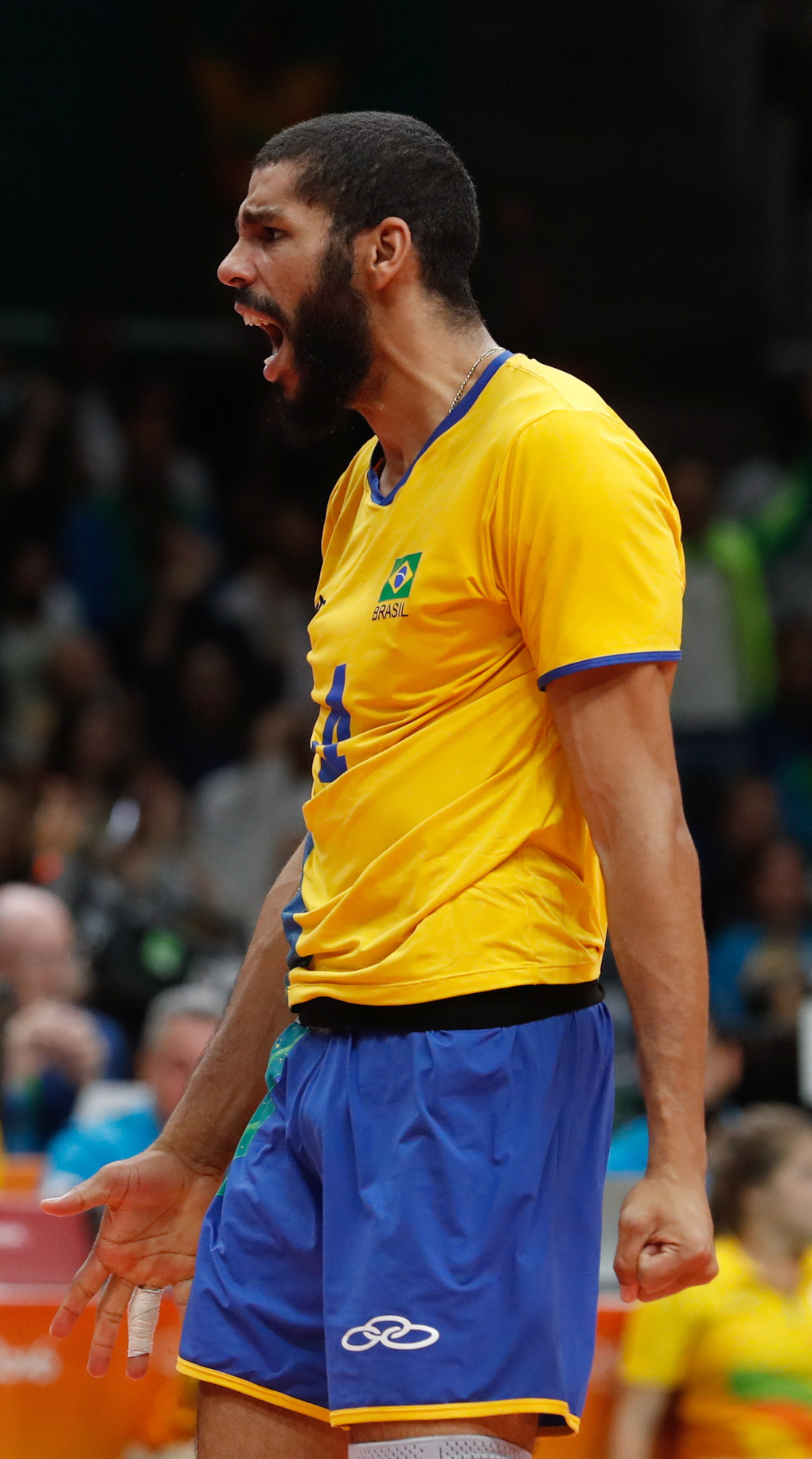
- de Souza in 2016

Personal information
- Full name: Wallace Leandro de Souza
- Nationality: (Brazil) Brazilian
- Born: 26 June 1987 (age 39) São Paulo, Brazil
- Height: 1.98 m (6 ft 6 in)
- Weight: 85 kg (187 lb)
- Spike: 360 cm (142 in)
- Block: 340 cm (134 in)

Volleyball information
- Position: Opposite
- Current club: Sada Cruzeiro

Career
- Years: Team
- 2006–2008 2008–2009 2009–2016 2016–2018 2018–2020 2020–2021 2021–present: (Brazil) EC Banespa (Brazil) Vôlei Futuro (Brazil) Sada Cruzeiro (Brazil) Vôlei Taubaté (Brazil) SESC RJ (Turkey) Spor Toto (Brazil) Sada Cruzeiro

National team
- Years: Team
- 2009–2022: Brazil
Honours
Men's volleyball
Representing Brazil
Olympic Games
Gold medal – first place	2016 Rio de Janeiro
Silver medal – second place	2012 London
FIVB World Championship
Silver medal – second place	2014 Poland
Silver medal – second place	2018 Bulgaria/Italy
Bronze medal – third place	2022 Poland/Slovenia
FIVB World Cup
Bronze medal – third place	2011 Japan
FIVB World Grand Champions Cup
Gold medal – first place	2013 Japan
Gold medal – first place	2017 Japan
FIVB Nations League
Gold medal – first place	2021 Rimini
FIVB World League
Silver medal – second place	2013 Mar del Plata
Silver medal – second place	2014 Florence
Silver medal – second place	2016 Kraków
Silver medal – second place	2017 Curitiba
Pan American Games
Gold medal – first place	2011 Guadalajara
CSV South American Championship
Gold medal – first place	2011 Cuiabá
Gold medal – first place	2013 Cabo Frio
Gold medal – first place	2017 Chile

Wallace Leandro de Souza (born 26 June 1987), known by the mononym Wallace, is a Brazilian volleyball player, member of the Brazil men's national volleyball team, 2016 Olympic Champion, silver medallist of the Olympic Games (London 2012), 2014 and 2018 World Championship, three–time South American Champion (2011, 2013, 2017).

After winning the bronze medal of 2022 FIVB Volleyball Men's World Championship, he announced his retirement from Brazil national team.

In January 2023 Wallace expressed his desire to see Brazilian president Lula murdered, publishing a social media poll alongside a photo of himself holding a gun, asking his followers “Would you shoot Lula in the face with this 12 [shotgun?]”

The post caused great controversy. The Brazilian Olympic Committee forwarded a representation to the Ethics Council of the entity about the case and the minister of the Social Communication Secretariat of the Federal Government, Paulo Pimenta, called the Attorney General's Office (AGU). Finally, Sada Cruzeiro announced Wallace's suspension indefinitely.

Later, Wallace deleted the post and apologized for what happened: "Anyone who knows me knows that I would never incite violence under any circumstances, especially to our President. So, I come here to apologize, it was an unfortunate post that I ended up making. I was wrong."

== Sporting achievements ==
=== Clubs ===
- FIVB Club World Championship
  - Betim 2013 – with Sada Cruzeiro
  - Betim 2015 – with Sada Cruzeiro
  - Betim 2021 – with Sada Cruzeiro
  - Uberlândia 2024 – with Sada Cruzeiro
  - Betim 2022 – with Sada Cruzeiro
- CSV South American Club Championship
  - Linares 2012 – with Sada Cruzeiro
  - Belo Horizonte 2014 – with Sada Cruzeiro
  - Taubate 2016 – with Sada Cruzeiro
- National championships
  - 2011/2012 Brazilian Championship – with Sada Cruzeiro
  - 2013/2014 Brazilian Championship – with Sada Cruzeiro
  - 2014/2015 Brazilian Championship – with Sada Cruzeiro
  - 2015/2016 Brazilian Championship – with Sada Cruzeiro
  - 2020/2021 Turkish Cup – with Spor Toto

=== Individual awards ===
- 2011: Pan American Games – Best spiker
- 2012: FIVB Club World Championship – Best server
- 2013: FIVB Club World Championship – Most valuable player
- 2013: FIVB World Grand Champions Cup – Best opposite spiker
- 2014: CSV South American Club Championship – Most valuable player
- 2014: CSV South American Club Championship – Best opposite spiker
- 2014: FIVB Club World Championship – Best opposite spiker
- 2016: FIVB World League – Best opposite spiker
- 2016: Olympic Games – Best opposite spiker
- 2017: FIVB World League – Best opposite spiker
- 2017: CSV South American Championship – Best opposite spiker
- 2019: Memorial of Hubert Jerzy Wagner – Best server
- 2021: FIVB Nations League – Most valuable player (shared with Bartosz Kurek)
- 2021: FIVB Nations League – Best opposite spiker
- 2021: FIVB Club World Championship – Best opposite spiker
- 2024: FIVB Club World Championship – Most valuable player
- 2024: FIVB Club World Championship – Best opposite spiker

Awards
Preceded by Not awarded	Best Opposite Spiker of FIVB World Grand Champions Cup; 2013	Succeeded by (United States) Matt Anderson
Preceded by (Italy) Osmany Juantorena	Most Valuable Player of FIVB Club World Championship; 2013	Succeeded by (Russia) Dmitry Muserskiy
Preceded by (Bulgaria) Tsvetan Sokolov	Best Opposite Spiker of FIVB World League; 2014; 2016; 2017	Succeeded by Not awarded
Preceded by Not awarded	Best Opposite Spiker of Olympic Games; 2016	Succeeded by (Russia) Maxim Mikhaylov
