= South American Men's Volleyball Club Championship =

Sport competition

Men's South American Volleyball Club Championship
- Current season, competition or edition: 2026 Men's South American Volleyball Club Championship
- Sport: Volleyball
- Founded: 2009
- First season: 2009
- No. of teams: 9
- Country: CSV members
- Continent: South America (CSV)
- Most recent champion: (Brazil) Vôlei Renata (1st title)
- Most titles: (Brazil) Sada Cruzeiro (11 titles)

The South American Men's Volleyball Club Championship is an international men's club volleyball competition organized by the Confederación Sudamericana de Voleibol (CSV), the sport's governing body in South America. The competition was first contested in 2009 in Florianópolis, Brazil and tournaments have been held every year since then.

In addition to crowning the South American champions, the tournament also serves as a qualifying tournament for the FIVB Volleyball Men's Club World Championship.

== Results ==
Year	Host	Final			3rd place match			Teams
Year	Host	Champions	Score	Runners-up	3rd place	Score	4th place	Teams
2009; Details	(Brazil); Florianópolis	(Brazil); Florianópolis	3–2	(Brazil); Brasil VC	(Brazil); Sada Cruzeiro	3–1	(Brazil); Minas Tênis Clube	8
2010; Details	(Argentina); San Carlos de Bolívar / San Juan	(Argentina); Bolívar	3–2	(Brazil); Florianópolis	(Argentina); UPCN San Juan	3–1	(Paraguay); Deportivo Colón	6
2011; Details	(Brazil); São Paulo	(Brazil); SESI São Paulo	Round-robin	(Argentina); UPCN San Juan	(Chile); Universidad Católica	Round-robin	(Peru); Peerless	5
2012; Details	(Chile); Linares	(Brazil); Sada Cruzeiro	3–1	(Argentina); UPCN San Juan	(Venezuela); Huracanes de Bolívar	3–1	(Chile); Linares	8
2013; Details	(Brazil); Belo Horizonte	(Argentina); UPCN San Juan	3–0	(Brazil); Minas Tênis Clube	(Brazil); RJX	3–0	(Argentina); Buenos Aires Unidos	7
2014; Details	(Brazil); Belo Horizonte	(Brazil); Sada Cruzeiro	3–2	(Argentina); UPCN San Juan	(Brazil); Minas Tênis Clube	3–0	(Argentina); Boca Juniors	8
2015; Details	(Argentina); San Juan	(Argentina); UPCN San Juan	3–2	(Brazil); Sada Cruzeiro	(Argentina); Lomas	3–1	(Brazil); Taubaté	7
2016; Details	(Brazil); Taubaté	(Brazil); Sada Cruzeiro	3–0	(Brazil); Taubaté	(Argentina); UPCN San Juan	3–0	(Argentina); Bolívar	7
2017; Details	(Brazil); Montes Claros	(Brazil); Sada Cruzeiro	3–0	(Argentina); Bolívar	(Argentina); UPCN San Juan	3–0	(Brazil); Montes Claros	7
2018; Details	(Brazil); Montes Claros	(Brazil); Sada Cruzeiro	3–0	(Argentina); Lomas	(Brazil); Montes Claros	3–1	(Argentina); Bolívar	6
2019; Details	(Brazil); Belo Horizonte	(Brazil); Sada Cruzeiro	3–1	(Argentina); UPCN San Juan	(Argentina); Club Obras Sanitarias	3–1	(Brazil); Minas Tênis Clube	6
2020; Details	(Brazil); Contagem	(Brazil); Sada Cruzeiro	3–1	(Argentina); UPCN San Juan	(Brazil); Taubaté	3–1	(Argentina); Bolívar	6
2022; Details	(Brazil); Contagem	(Brazil); Sada Cruzeiro	3–0	(Brazil); Minas Tênis Clube	(Brazil); Vôlei Renata	3–2	(Argentina); Policial Vóley	9
2023; Details	(Brazil); Araguari	(Brazil); Sada Cruzeiro	3–1	(Brazil); Minas Tênis Clube	(Brazil); Araguari Vôlei	3–2	(Argentina); Ciudad Vóley	9
2024; Details	(Brazil); Blumenau	(Brazil); Sada Cruzeiro	3–0	(Argentina); Ciudad Vóley	(Brazil); Vôlei São José	3–1	(Brazil); Blumenau	9
2025; Details	(Brazil); Uberlândia	(Brazil); Sada Cruzeiro	3–2	(Brazil); Praia Clube	(Brazil); SESI Bauru	3–1	(Argentina); Monteros	9
2026; Details	(Brazil); Campinas	(Brazil); Vôlei Renata	3–2	(Brazil); Sada Cruzeiro	(Brazil); Itambé Minas	3–1	(Argentina); Ciudad Vóley	9

== Medals summary ==
=== Medal table by club ===
Rank	Club	Gold	Silver	Bronze	Total
1	(Brazil) Sada Cruzeiro	11	2	1	14
2	(Argentina) UPCN San Juan	2	5	3	10
3	(Argentina) Bolívar	1	1	0	2
3	(Brazil) Florianópolis	1	1	0	2
5	(Brazil) SESI	1	0	1	2
5	(Brazil) Vôlei Renata	1	0	1	2
7	(Brazil) Minas Tênis Clube	0	3	1	4
8	(Argentina) Lomas	0	1	1	2
8	(Brazil) Taubaté	0	1	1	2
10	(Brazil) Brasil VC	0	1	0	1
10	(Argentina) Ciudad Vóley	0	1	0	1
10	(Brazil) Praia Clube	0	1	0	1
13	(Brazil) Araguari Vôlei	0	0	1	1
13	(Argentina) Club Obras Sanitarias	0	0	1	1
13	(Venezuela) Huracanes de Bolívar	0	0	1	1
13	(Brazil) Montes Claros	0	0	1	1
13	(Brazil) RJX	0	0	1	1
13	(Chile) Universidad Católica	0	0	1	1
13	(Brazil) Vôlei São José	0	0	1	1
Totals (19 entries)		17	17	16	50

=== Medal table by country ===
Rank	Nation	Gold	Silver	Bronze	Total
1	Brazil	13	8	9	30
2	Argentina	3	8	5	16
3	Chile	0	0	1	1
3	Venezuela	0	0	1	1
Totals (4 entries)		16	16	16	48

== Most valuable player by edition ==
- 2009 – (Brazil) Bruno Rezende (Florianópolis)
- 2010 – (Argentina) Luciano de Cecco (Bolívar)
- 2011 – (Brazil) Murilo Endres (SESI São Paulo)
- 2012 – (Brazil) Evandro Guerra (Sada Cruzeiro)
- 2013 – (Argentina) Demián González (UPCN San Juan)
- 2014 – (Brazil) Wallace de Souza (Sada Cruzeiro)
- 2015 – (Bulgaria) Nikolay Uchikov (UPCN San Juan)
- 2016 – (Cuba) Yoandry Leal (Sada Cruzeiro)
- 2017 – (Cuba) Yoandry Leal (Sada Cruzeiro)
- 2018 – (Cuba) Robertlandy Simón (Sada Cruzeiro)
- 2019 – (United States) Taylor Sander (Sada Cruzeiro)
- 2020 – (Brazil) Fernando Kreling (Sada Cruzeiro)
- 2022 – (Cuba) Miguel López (Sada Cruzeiro)
- 2023 – (Cuba) Miguel López (Sada Cruzeiro)
- 2024 – (Cuba) Miguel López (Sada Cruzeiro)
- 2025 – (Brazil) Welinton Oppenkoski (Sada Cruzeiro)
- 2026 – (Brazil) Bruno Rezende (Vôlei Renata)

== See also ==
- South American Women's Volleyball Club Championship
