= Montes Claros Vôlei =

Brazilian volleyball club

América Volei
- Full name: Associação Educacional Esportiva e Social do Brasil (AEESB/Montes Claros)
- Short name: Montes Claros Vôlei
- Nickname: Pequi Atômico (Atomic Pequi)
- Founded: 1988
- Ground: Tancredo Neves, Montes Claros (Capacity: 5,000)
- Chairman: (Brazil) Andrey Souza
- Manager: (Brazil) Marcelinho Ramos
- League: Superliga Brasileira de Voleibol
- 2017–18: 10th
- Website: Club home page

Uniforms
Home	Away

Montes Claros Vôlei is a Brazilian men's volleyball team from Montes Claros, Minas Gerais. The team has been created in Goiás in 1998 under the name Associação de Paula e Montecristo Voleibol. It was transferred to Montes Claros to dispute the Brazilian Superleague for the season 2013–14, and was rebranded to Montes Claros Vôlei.

In the 2019/20 season, Montes Claros will represent América Futebol Clube.

== Current squad ==
Squad as of October 31, 2016

No.	Player	Position	Height (m)
1	(Brazil) Luan Weber	Opposite	2.03
2	(Brazil) Gabriel Lima	Setter	1.89
3	(Brazil) Alexsandro Vicente	Setter	1.90
4	(Brazil) Bruno Dianini	Middle blocker	2.00
5	(Brazil) Jonatas Cardoso	Outside hitter	1.93
7	(Brazil) Murilo Radke	Setter	1.98
8	(Brazil) Alexandre Monteiro	Outside hitter	1.96
9	(Brazil) Robson Augusto	Middle blocker	2.05
10	(Brazil) Guilherme Kachel	Libero	1.90
11	(Brazil) Robinson Dvoranen	Outside hitter	2.01
14	(Brazil) Rafael Martins	Middle blocker	2.05
17	(Brazil) Thiago Rey	Middle blocker	2.04
18	(Brazil) Gian de Morais	Libero	1.70
19	(Brazil) Willian Reffatti	Outside hitter	1.93
20	(Brazil) Wanderson Campos	Opposite	2.00

- Head coach: (Brazil) Marcelinho Ramos
- Assistant coach: (Brazil) Leandro Dutra
