= 2019 Men's South American Volleyball Club Championship =

Eleventh official edition of the Men's South American Volleyball Club Championship

2019 Men's South American Club Championship
Tournament details
- Host country: Brazil
- Dates: February, 26 to March, 2
- Teams: 6
- Venue: 1 (in 1 host city)

Final positions
- Champions: (Brazil) Sada Cruzeiro (6th title)

Tournament awards
- MVP: (United States) Taylor Sander

The 2019 Men's South American Volleyball Club Championship was the eleventh official edition of the Men's South American Volleyball Club Championship. It was played by six teams from February, 26 to March 2, 2019, in Belo Horizonte, Minas Gerais, Brazil.

Sada Cruzeiro won its forth consecutive title, the sixth overall, and qualified for the 2019 FIVB Volleyball Men's Club World Championship. The American outside hitter Taylor Sander was elected the competition's MVP.

== Pools composition ==
Pool A	Pool B
(Peru) Club de Regatas Lima (Brazil) Sada Cruzeiro (Argentina) UPCN San Juan	(Uruguay) Nacional (Brazil) Minas Tênis Clube (Argentina) Club Obras Sanitarias

== Venue ==
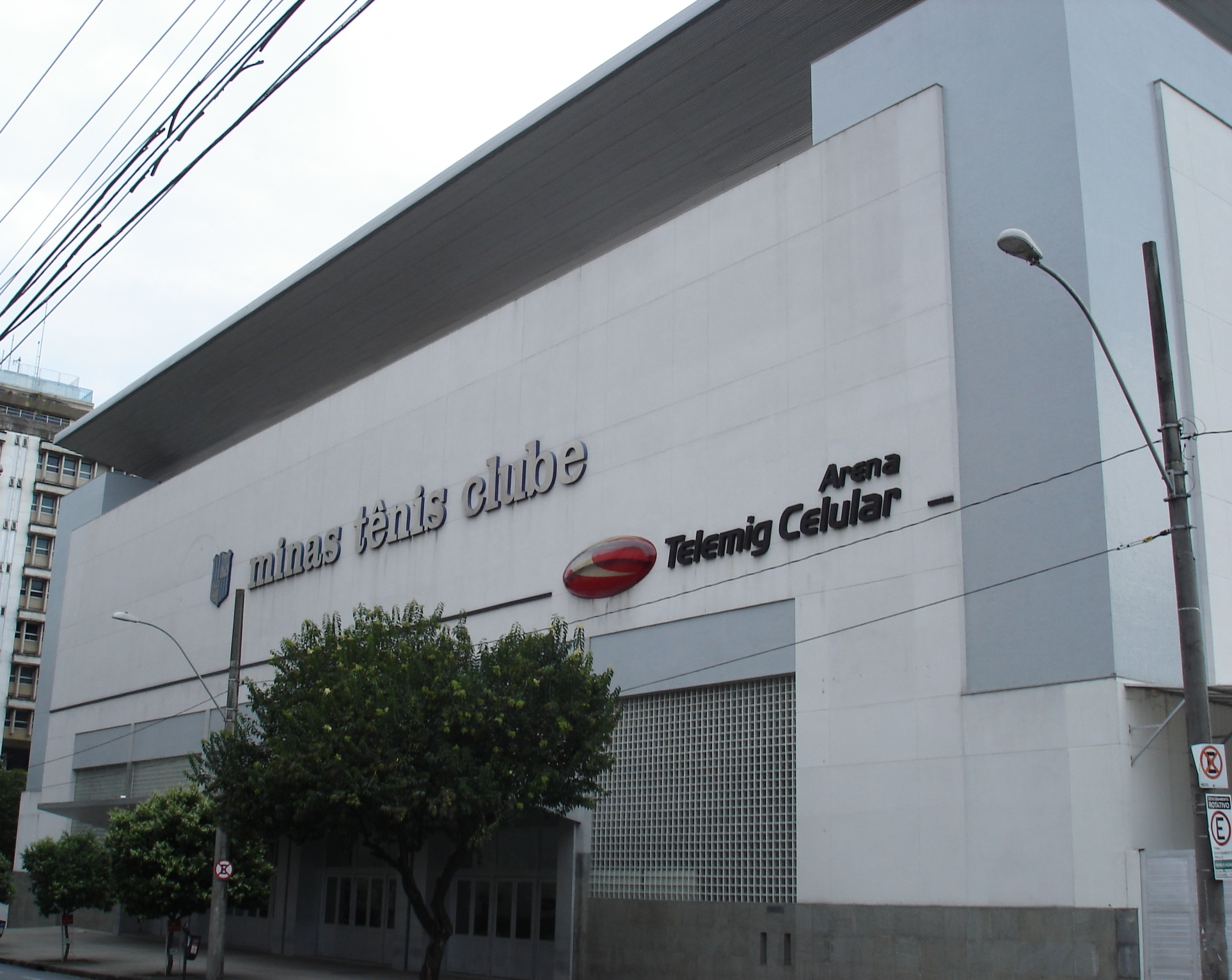

All the matches were played at the Arena Minas in Belo Horizonte, Brazil.

== Preliminary round ==
- All times are Brasília Time (UTC−03:00).

=== Pool A ===
Pos	Team	Pld	W	L	Pts	SW	SL	SR	SPW	SPL	SPR	Qualification
1	(Brazil) Sada Cruzeiro	2	2	0	5	6	2	3.000	181	144	1.257	Semifinals
2	(Argentina) UPCN San Juan	2	1	1	3	5	4	1.250	199	185	1.076	Semifinals
3	(Peru) Club de Regatas Lima	2	0	2	0	1	6	0.167	120	171	0.702	5th place match

Date	Time		Score		Set 1	Set 2	Set 3	Set 4	Set 5	Total
26 Feb	20:00	Sada Cruzeiro (Brazil)	3–2	(Argentina) UPCN San Juan	23–25	18–25	25–22	25-20	15-11	106–103
27 Feb	20:00	Sada Cruzeiro (Brazil)	3–0	(Peru) Club de Regatas Lima	25–13	25–14	25–15			75–41
28 Feb	20:00	UPCN San Juan (Argentina)	3–1	(Peru) Club de Regatas Lima	25–22	21–25	25–15	25–17		96–79

=== Pool B ===
Pos	Team	Pld	W	L	Pts	SW	SL	SR	SPW	SPL	SPR	Qualification
1	(Brazil) Minas Tênis Clube	2	2	0	6	6	1	6.000	171	139	1.230	Semifinals
2	(Argentina) Club Obras Sanitarias	2	1	1	4	4	3	1.333	164	157	1.045	Semifinals
3	(Uruguay) Nacional	2	0	2	0	0	6	0.000	111	150	0.740	5th place match

Date	Time		Score		Set 1	Set 2	Set 3	Set 4	Set 5	Total
26 Feb	18:00	Minas Tênis Clube (Brazil)	3–1	(Argentina) Club Obras Sanitarias	21–25	25–20	25–22	25-22		96–89
27 Feb	18:00	Minas Tênis Clube (Brazil)	3–0	(Uruguay) Nacional	25–23	25–12	25–25			75–50
28 Feb	18:00	Club Obras Sanitarias (Argentina)	3–0	(Uruguay) Nacional	25–19	25–20	25–22			75–61

== Final round ==
=== Bracket ===
Semifinals
1 March
(Brazil) Sada Cruzeiro	3
(Argentina) Club Obras Sanitarias	2
1 March
(Brazil) Minas Tênis Clube	0
(Argentina) UPCN San Juan	3

Final
2 March
(Brazil) Sada Cruzeiro	3
(Argentina) UPCN San Juan	1
3rd place
2 March
(Brazil) Minas Tênis Clube	1
(Argentina) Club Obras Sanitarias	3

=== Fifth place match ===
Date	Time		Score		Set 1	Set 2	Set 3	Set 4	Set 5	Total
1 Mar		Nacional (Uruguay)	0-3	(Peru) Club de Regatas Lima	17-25	22-25	13-25			52-75

=== Semifinals ===
Date	Time		Score		Set 1	Set 2	Set 3	Set 4	Set 5	Total
1 Mar	21:30	Sada Cruzeiro (Brazil)	3–2	(Argentina) Club Obras Sanitarias	24–26	22–25	27–25	25-23	15-13	113–112
1 Mar	19:30	UPCN San Juan (Argentina)	3–0	(Brazil) Minas Tênis Clube	27–25	25–18	25–14			77-57

=== Third place match ===
Date	Time		Score		Set 1	Set 2	Set 3	Set 4	Set 5	Total
2 Mar	17:30	Minas Tênis Clube (Brazil)	1–3	(Argentina) Club Obras Sanitarias	20–25	25–22	24–26	17–25		86-98

=== Final ===
Date	Time		Score		Set 1	Set 2	Set 3	Set 4	Set 5	Total
2 Mar	20:30	Sada Cruzeiro (Brazil)	3–1	(Argentina) UPCN San Juan	25–19	25–18	21–25	25-16		96–78

== Final standing ==
Rank	Team
1st place, gold medalist(s)	(Brazil) Sada Cruzeiro
2nd place, silver medalist(s)	(Argentina) UPCN San Juan
3rd place, bronze medalist(s)	(Argentina) Club Obras Sanitarias
4	(Brazil) Minas Tênis Clube
5	(Peru) Club de Regatas Lima
6	(Uruguay) Nacional

Qualified for the 2019 Club World Championship

2019 Men's South American Volleyball Club Champions

6th title

== All-Star team ==
The following players were chosen for the tournament's "All-Star team":

- Most valuable player
  - (United States) Taylor Sander (Sada Cruzeiro)
- Best Opposite
  - (Cuba) Jesús Herrera Jaime (Club Obras Sanitarias)
- Best outside hitters
  - (Brazil) Rodrigo Leão (Sada Cruzeiro)
  - (Cuba) Osniel Melgarejo (Club Obras Sanitarias)
- Best setter
  - (Argentina) Maximiliano Cavanna (UPCN San Juan)
- Best middle blockers
  - (Brazil) Flávio Gualberto (Minas Tênis Clube)
  - (Brazil) Isac Santos (Sada Cruzeiro)
- Best libero
  - (Argentina) Matías Salvo (UPCN San Juan)

== See also ==
- 2019 Women's South American Volleyball Club Championship
