= Demián González =

Argentine volleyball player (born 1983)

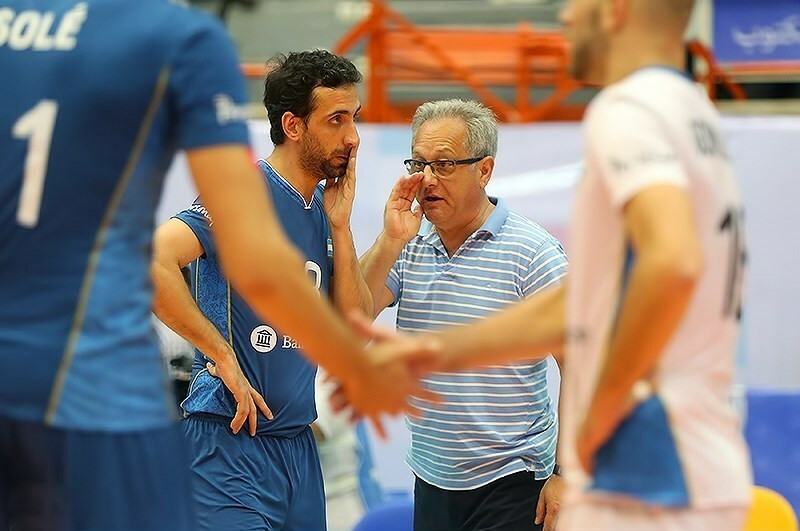
- González talks to his coach Julio Velasco (VWL 2016)

Personal information
- Nationality: Argentine
- Born: 21 February 1983 (age 43)
- Height: 192 cm (6 ft 4 in)
- Weight: 81 kg (179 lb)
- Spike: 328 cm (129 in)
- Block: 318 cm (125 in)

Volleyball information
- Position: Setter
- Number: 8

Career
Years
2002/2006
2006/2007
2007/2008
2008/2015
2015/2016
2016/2017
2016/2018
2018/2022
Teams
Argentina -Clubs de Amigos
Rumania -Tomis Constansa
Argentina - Chubut Voley
Argentina - UPCN
Brazil - Kirin Club
Turquía - Halkbank Ankara
Argentina - Bolivar Voley
Brazil - Renata Volei

National team
2010 - 2016	Argentina

Demián González (born 21 February 1983) is an Argentine male volleyball player. He was part of the Argentina men's national volleyball team at the 2010 FIVB Volleyball Men's World Championship in Italy. He was a part of the Argentina national team that ranked fifth place at the 2016 Rio de Janeiro Olympic Games.

== Clubs ==
- Argentina - Club de Amigos (2002/2006)
- Rumania - Tomis Constansa (2006/2007)
- Argentina - Chubut Voley (2007/2008]
- Argentina - UPCN (2008/2015)
- Brazil - Kirin Club (2015/2016)
- Turquía - Halkbank Ankara (2016/2017)
- Argentina - Bolivar Voley (2016/2018)
- Brazil - Renata Volei (2018/2022)
