= Peerless Volleyball Club =

Men's volleyball team in Peru

Peerless Volleyball Club is a men's volleyball team, based in Lima, Peru. They won the Peruvian Volleyball League in the 2010–11 and the 2011–12 season.

== Results ==
- South American Championship:
  - 4th Place: 2010
- LNSV:
  - Winners (8): 2010, 2011, 2012, 2013, 2015, 2017, 2021, 2022
