= UPCN Vóley Club =

Argentine volleyball club

- Full name: UPCN San Juan Voley Club
- Nickname: Cóndores (the Condors)
- Founded: March 1, 2007; 18 years ago
- Ground: Estadio Aldo Cantoni (Capacity: 8,000)
- Manager: Fabián Armoa
- League: Liga Argentina de Voleibol
- 2014-15: 1st (champion)
- Website: Club home page

Uniforms
Home	Away

UPCN Voley or UPCN San Juan is an Argentine volleyball club based in San Juan. The club was founded in 2007 and takes part of Liga Argentina de Voleibol – Serie A1, the top level of the Argentine men's volleyball league system, since 2009–10 season. It has won 5 consecutive national championships between 2011 and 2015, becoming one of the most successful clubs on the league's history.

== Titles ==
=== Domestic ===
- Liga Argentina A1
  - First Place (6): 2010–11, 2011–12, 2012–13, 2013–14, 2014–15, 2015–16
- Copa ACLAV
  - First Place (2): 2012, 2013

=== International ===
- Men's South American Volleyball Club Championship
  - First Place (2): 2013, 2015
- FIVB Volleyball Men's Club World Championship
  - Third Place (2): 2014, 2015
