= Lucas Saatkamp =

Brazilian volleyball player

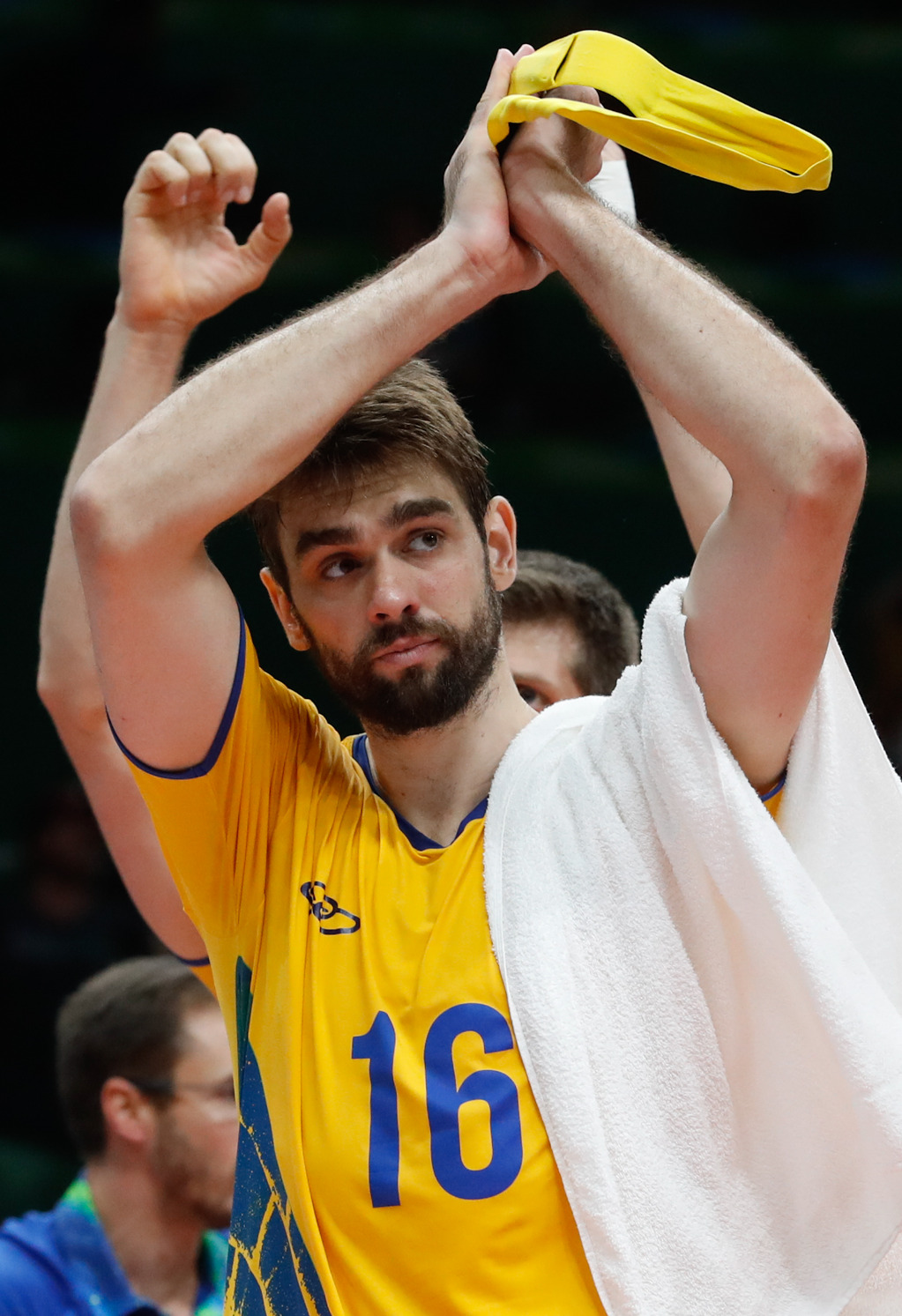
- Saatkamp at the 2016 Olympics

Personal information
- Nickname: Lucas, Lucão
- Born: 6 March 1986 (age 40); Colinas, Rio Grande do Sul, Brazil
- Height: 210 cm (6 ft 11 in)
- Weight: 101 kg (223 lb)
- Spike: 340 cm (134 in)
- Block: 321 cm (126 in)

Volleyball information
- Position: Middle Blocker
- Current club: (Brazil) Sada Cruzeiro
- Number: 16

Career
Years	Teams
2004–2007	(Brazil) Sport Club Ulbra
2007–2010	(Brazil) Cimed Florianópolis
2010–2011	(Brazil) GRER Araçatuba
2011–2013	(Brazil) RJX Rio de Janeiro
2013–2015	(Brazil) SESI São Paulo
2015–2016	(Italy) DHL Modena Volley
2016–2018	(Brazil) SESI São Paulo
2018–2021	(Brazil) Funvic Taubaté
2021–2022	(Brazil) Brasil Vôlei Clube
2022–present	(Brazil) Sada Cruzeiro

National team
2007–2024	Brazil
Honours
Men's volleyball
Representing Brazil
Olympic Games
Gold medal – first place	2016 Rio de Janeiro	Team
Silver medal – second place	2012 London	Team
World Championship
Gold medal – first place	2010 Italy	Team
Silver medal – second place	2014 Poland	Team
Silver medal – second place	2018 Italy-Bulgaria	Team
Bronze medal – third place	2022 Poland/Slovenia	Team
World Cup
Gold medal – first place	2019 Japan	Team
Bronze medal – third place	2011 Japan	Team
World Grand Champions Cup
Gold medal – first place	2009 Japan	Team
Gold medal – first place	2013 Japan	Team
Gold medal – first place	2017 Japan	Team
Nations League
Gold medal – first place	2021 Rimini
World League
Gold medal – first place	2009 Belgrade	Team
Gold medal – first place	2010 Córdoba	Team
Silver medal – second place	2011 Gdańsk	Team
Silver medal – second place	2013 Mar del Plata	Team
Silver medal – second place	2014 Florence	Team
Silver medal – second place	2016 Kraków	Team
Silver medal – second place	2017 Curitiba	Team
South American Championship
Gold medal – first place	2009 Bogotá
Gold medal – first place	2011 Cuiabá
Gold medal – first place	2013 Cabo Frio
Gold medal – first place	2015 Maceió
Gold medal – first place	2017 Santiago/Temuco
Gold medal – first place	2021 Brasília
Silver medal – second place	2023 Recife
- Last updated: 16 December 2024

Lucas Saatkamp (born 6 March 1986) is a Brazilian volleyball player and a two-time Olympian. As a member of the Brazilian national volleyball team, he won a silver medal at the 2012 Summer Olympics in London, United Kingdom, and a gold medal at the 2016 Summer Olympics in Rio de Janeiro, Brazil.

Saatkamp won a gold medal with the Brazilian national team at the 2010 World Championship, won a silver medal at the 2014 and 2018 World Championships, and has won numerous medals at the World League.

Saatkamp has played in numerous professional teams throughout his career, mostly in Brazil.

== Personal life ==
Saatkamp was born in Colinas, Rio Grande do Sul, Brazil. On April 27, 2015, he married his wife, Beatriz. They have a son, Theo.

== Sporting achievements ==
=== Clubs ===
- FIVB Club World Championship
  - Uberlândia 2024 – with Sada Cruzeiro
  - Betim 2022 – with Sada Cruzeiro
- CSV South American Club Championship
  - 2009 Florianópolis – with Cimed Florianópolis
- National championships
  - 2007/2008 Brazilian Championship – with Cimed Florianópolis
  - 2008/2009 Brazilian Championship – with Cimed Florianópolis
  - 2009/2010 Brazilian Championship – with Cimed Florianópolis
  - 2012/2013 Brazilian Championship – with RJX Rio de Janeiro
  - 2015/2016 Italian Championship – with DHL Modena
  - 2018/2019 Brazilian Superliga – with Funvic Taubaté
- National trophies
  - 2015/2016 Italian SuperCup – with DHL Modena
  - 2015/2016 Italian Cup – with DHL Modena

=== National team ===
- 2005 FIVB U19 World Championship
- 2007 Pan American Games
- 2007 America's Cup
- 2008 America's Cup
- 2009 South American Championship
- 2009 World Grand Champions Cup
- 2009 FIVB World League
- 2010 FIVB World League
- 2010 FIVB World Championship
- 2011 FIVB World League
- 2011 South American Championship
- 2011 FIVB World Cup
- 2012 Olympic Games
- 2013 FIVB World League
- 2013 South American Championship
- 2013 World Grand Champions Cup
- 2014 FIVB World League
- 2014 FIVB World Championship
- 2015 South American Championship
- 2016 FIVB World League
- 2016 Olympic Games
- 2017 FIVB World League
- 2017 South American Championship
- 2018 FIVB World Championship
- 2019 FIVB World Cup
- 2021 Nations League
- 2021 South American Championship
- 2022 FIVB World Championship

=== Individual awards ===
- 2007 America's Cup – Best Server
- 2008 Brazil Superliga – Best Middle Blocker
- 2013 South American Championship – Best Spiker
- 2014 FIVB World League – Best Middle Blocker
- 2017 FIVB World Grand Champions Cup – Best Middle Blocker
- 2018 FIVB World Championship – Best Middle Blocker
- 2018–19 Brazilian Superliga – Best Middle Blocker
- 2019 FIVB World Cup – Best Middle Blocker
- 2024 FIVB Club World Championship – Best Middle Blocker

Awards
Preceded by (Russia) Dmitriy Muserskiy (Italy) Emanuele Birarelli	Best Middle Blocker of FIVB World League; 2014 ex aequo (United States) David Lee	Succeeded by (United States) Maxwell Holt (Serbia) Srećko Lisinac
Preceded by (United States) Maxwell Holt and (Italy) Emanuele Birarelli	Best Middle Blocker of World Grand Champions Cup; 2017 ex aequo (Italy) Matteo Piano	Succeeded by TBD
