= Bruno Rezende =

Brazilian volleyball player (born 1986)

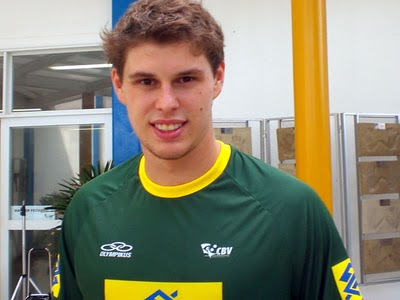
- Bruninho in 2017

Personal information
- Full name: Bruno Mossa de Rezende
- Born: 2 July 1986 (age 40); Rio de Janeiro, Brazil
- Height: 1.90 m (6 ft 3 in)
- Weight: 76 kg (168 lb)
- Spike: 323 cm (127 in)
- Block: 302 cm (119 in)

Volleyball information
- Position: Setter
- Current club: (Brazil) Volei Renata
- Number: 1

Career
Years	Teams
2003–2005	(Brazil) Unisul Florianópolis
2005–2011	(Brazil) Cimed Florianópolis
2011	(Italy) Casa Modena
2011–2012	(Brazil) Cimed Florianópolis
2012–2014	(Brazil) RJX
2014–2016	(Italy) DHL Modena
2016–2017	(Brazil) SESI São Paulo
2017–2018	(Italy) Azimut Modena
2018–2020	(Italy) Cucine Lube Civitanova
2020–2021	(Brazil) Funvic Taubaté
2021–2023	(Italy) Azimut Modena
2023–	(Brazil) Volei Renata

National team
2005–2006; 2007–2024	Brazil U-19; Brazil
Honours
Men's volleyball
Representing Brazil
Olympic Games
Gold medal – first place	2016 Rio de Janeiro	Team
Silver medal – second place	2008 Beijing	Team
Silver medal – second place	2012 London	Team
FIVB World Championship
Gold medal – first place	2010 Italy	Team
Silver medal – second place	2014 Poland	Team
Silver medal – second place	2018 Italy-Bulgaria	Team
Bronze medal – third place	2022 Poland/Slovenia	Team
FIVB World Cup
Gold medal – first place	2007 Japan	Team
Gold medal – first place	2019 Japan	Team
Bronze medal – third place	2011 Japan	Team
World Grand Champions Cup
Gold medal – first place	2009 Japan	Team
Gold medal – first place	2013 Japan	Team
Gold medal – first place	2017 Japan	Team
FIVB Nations League
Gold medal – first place	2021 Rimini
World League
Gold medal – first place	2009 Belgrade	Team
Gold medal – first place	2010 Córdoba	Team
Silver medal – second place	2011 Gdańsk	Team
Silver medal – second place	2013 Mar del Plata	Team
Silver medal – second place	2014 Florence	Team
Silver medal – second place	2016 Kraków	Team
Silver medal – second place	2017 Curitiba	Team
South American Championship
Gold medal – first place	2007 Santiago
Gold medal – first place	2009 Bogotá
Gold medal – first place	2011 Cuiabá
Gold medal – first place	2013 Cabo Frio
Gold medal – first place	2015 Maceió
Gold medal – first place	2017 Santiago/Temuco
Gold medal – first place	2021 Brasília
Silver medal – second place	2023 Recife
Pan American Games
Gold medal – first place	2007 Rio de Janeiro
Gold medal – first place	2011 Guadalajara
- Last updated: 5 September 2021

Bruno Mossa de Rezende (born 2 July 1986) is a Brazilian professional volleyball player who is currently a member of the Brazilian club Volei Renata.

The son of the legendary Brazilian coach Bernardo Rezende, he is one of the world's most accomplished setters and volleyball players. His accomplishments include: 2016 Olympic Champion, double silver medalist of the Olympic Games (Beijing 2008, London 2012), 2010 World Champion, double gold medalist of the World Grand Champions Cup (2009, 2013), South American Champion (2007, 2009, 2011, 2013, 2015, 2017, 2021), multimedalist of the World League, Pan American Games, Brazilian Champion (2004, 2006, 2008, 2009, 2010, 2013), Italian Champion (2016, 2019).

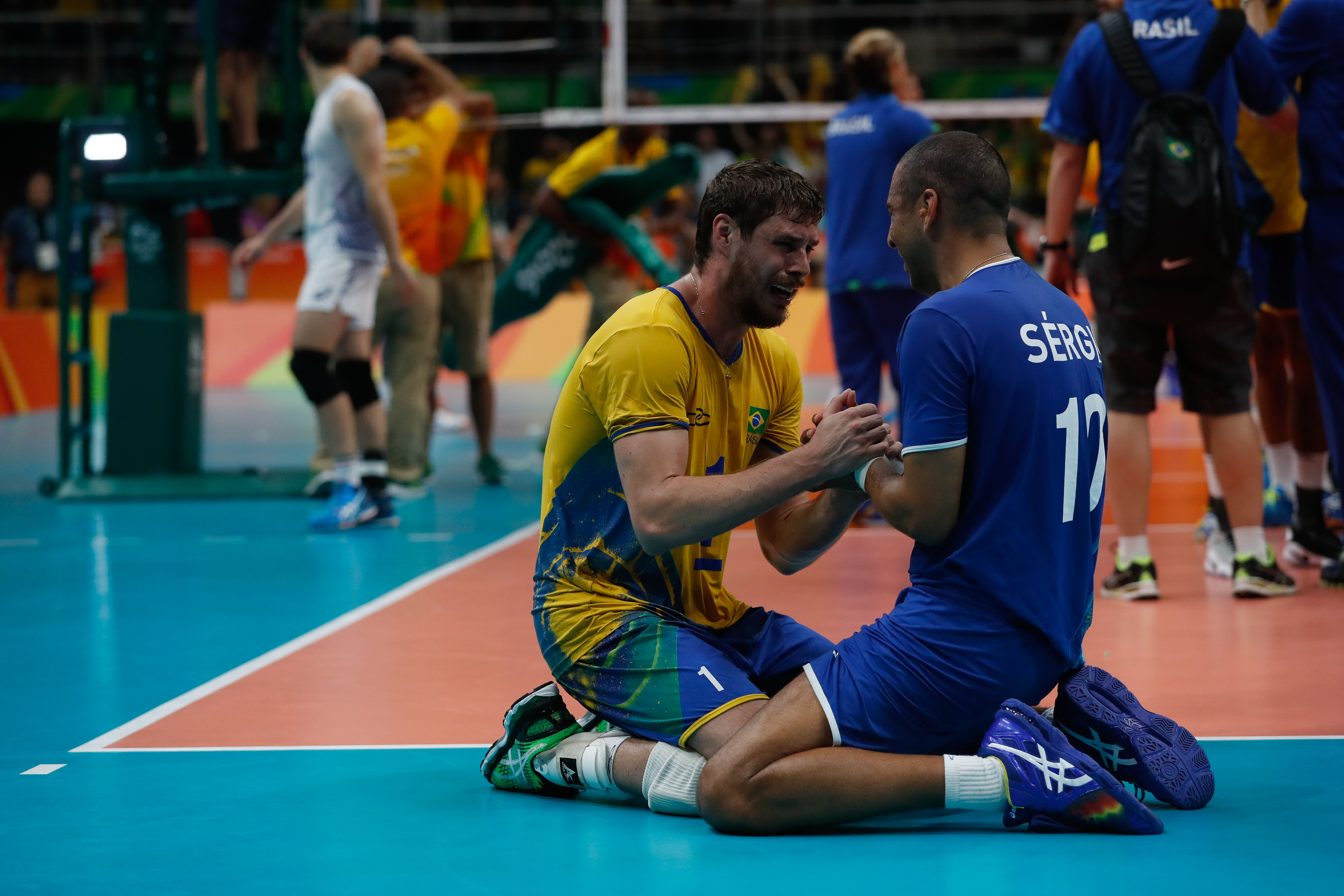
Bruno celebrating with team mate Sérgio Santos after winning the 2016 Olympics

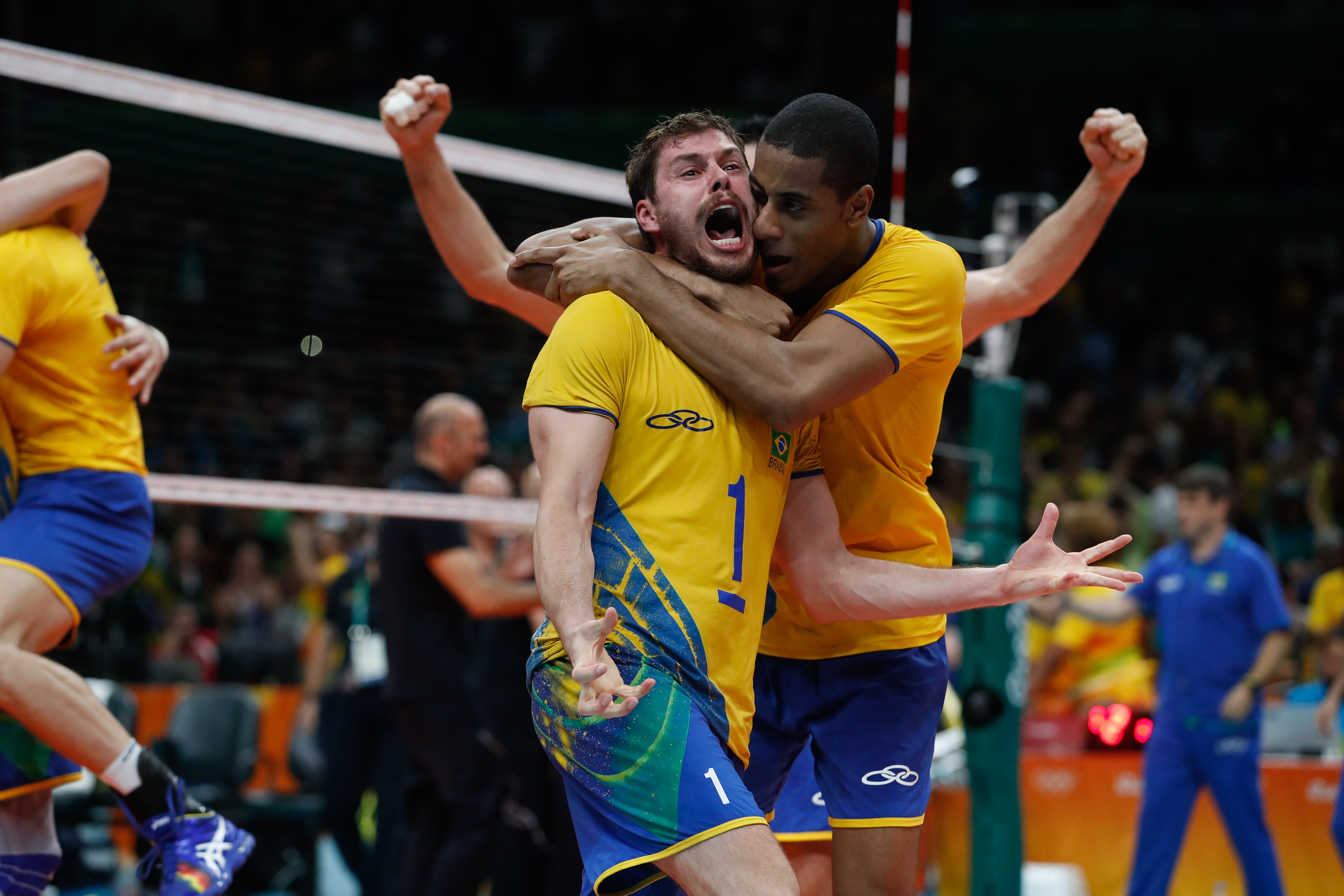
Bruno celebrating with Ricardo Lucarelli

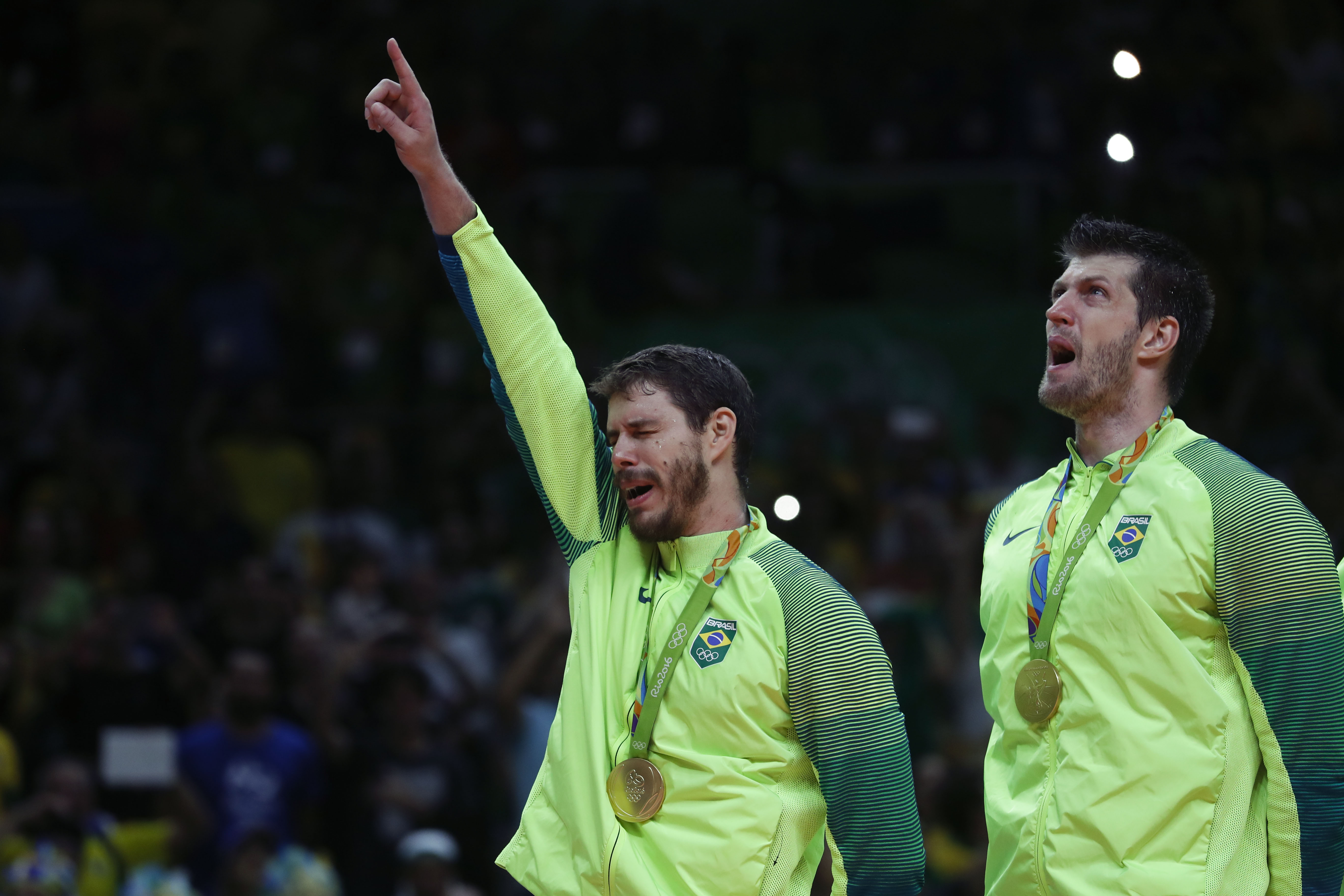
Bruno on the podium at the 2016 Rio Olympics after Brazil won the gold medal

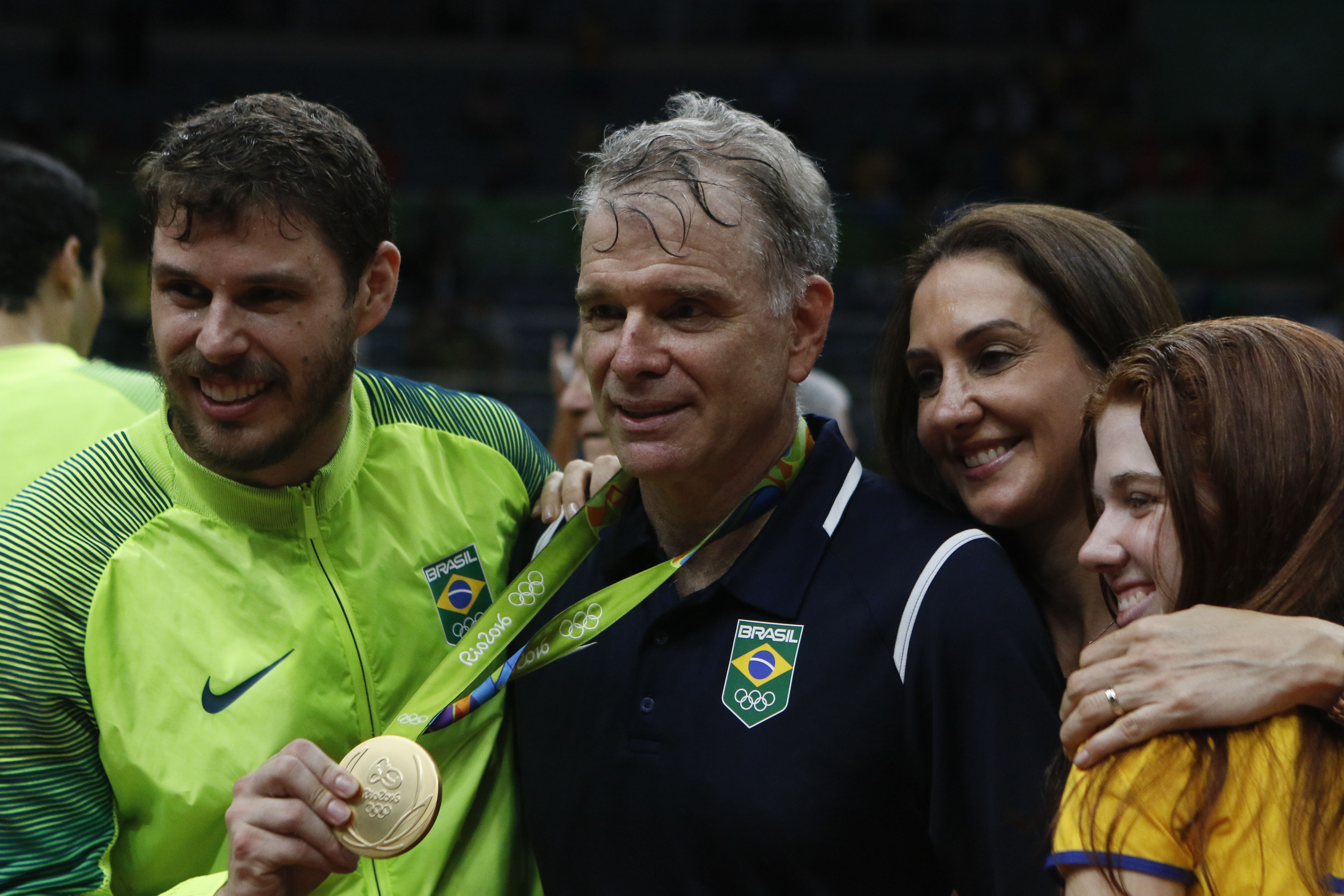
Bruno, his father and head coach Bernardo Rezende, and their family with the Rio 2016 gold medal

== Career ==
=== National team ===
Rezende started his career in the Brazil team in the youth teams, winning second place in the 2005 U20 World Championship. Playing for the adult team in 2007, he won the FIVB World League, the Pan American Games, the FIVB World Cup, and the South American Championship. In 2008, he participated in the Beijing Olympic Games, where Brazil won the silver medal.

In 2009, Bruno won two trophies with the national team: the World League and the Champions Cup. One year later, he won the World League for the third time and obtained his first FIVB World Championship. In 2011, he finished in second place in the World League and became a South American champion and Pan American champion. A few months later, Brazil won the bronze medal at the FIVB World Cup. In 2012, the Brazil national team once again won the silver medal at the London Olympic Games.

In 2013, Brazil finished in second place at the World League and won two gold medals in the South American Championship and the FIVB World Grand Champions Cup. The setter started the 2014 season with the silver medal in the FIVB World League and a silver medal in the dramatic final with Poland in FIVB World Championship. In 2015, Brazil won the gold medal in the American Championship. In the 2016 Rio Olympic Games, Brazil won a gold medal after the final match against Italy, and Bruno was named the best setter of the tournament.

== Personal life ==
Bruno is the only child of former volleyball players Bernardinho and Vera Mossa. His mother took part in Olympics three times (1980, 1984, 1988). His father is a silver medalist with the 1984 Olympic Games and former coach of Brazil men's national volleyball team. His parents divorced when he was a child. From his mother's first marriage to basketball player Éder Mundt Leme, Bruno has an older half-brother, Edson (born 1981). From her third marriage, he has a younger half-sister, Luisa. From his father's second marriage to former volleyball player Fernanda Venturini, Bruno has two younger half-sisters, Júlia (born 2002) and Victória (born 2009). His maternal grandfather was an athlete in the 1960s and a former Brazilian 110 metres record holder.

Bruno often faced accusations of nepotism when he first started playing for Brazil's national volleyball team, since his father, Bernardinho, was the team's coach from 2001 to 2017. However, he and his father vehemently defended themselves against the accusations and were always backed up by the other players, who said Bernardinho was tougher and more demanding of Bruno because of their family ties.

Bruno is close friends with footballer Neymar.

== Sporting achievements ==
=== Clubs ===
==== FIVB Club World Championship ====
- 2018 – with Cucine Lube Civitanova
- 2019 – with Cucine Lube Civitanova

==== CEV Champions League ====
- 2019 – with Cucine Lube Civitanova

==== CEV Cup ====
- 2023 – with Valsa Group Modena

==== South American Club Championship ====
- 2009 – with Cimed Florianópolis

==== National championships ====
- 2003/2004 Brazilian Championship, with Unisul Florianópolis
- 2005/2006 Brazilian Championship, with Cimed Florianópolis
- 2007/2008 Brazilian Championship, with Cimed Florianópolis
- 2008/2009 Brazilian Championship, with Cimed Florianópolis
- 2009/2010 Brazilian Championship, with Cimed Florianópolis
- 2012/2013 Brazilian Championship, with RJX
- 2014/2015 Italian Cup, with Modena Volley
- 2015/2016 Italian SuperCup, with DHL Modena
- 2015/2016 Italian Cup, with DHL Modena
- 2015/2016 Italian Championship, with DHL Modena
- 2018/2019 Italian Championship, with Cucine Lube Civitanova
- 2019/2020 Italian Cup, with Cucine Lube Civitanova

=== National team ===
- 2005 FIVB U19 World Championship
- 2007 America's Cup
- 2007 South American Championship
- 2007 Pan American Games
- 2007 FIVB World Cup
- 2008 America's Cup
- 2008 Olympic Games
- 2009 FIVB World League
- 2009 South American Championship
- 2009 FIVB World Grand Champions Cup
- 2010 FIVB World League
- 2010 FIVB World Championship
- 2011 FIVB World League
- 2011 South American Championship
- 2011 Pan American Games
- 2011 FIVB World Cup
- 2012 Olympic Games
- 2013 FIVB World League
- 2013 South American Championship
- 2013 FIVB World Grand Champions Cup
- 2014 FIVB World League
- 2014 FIVB World Championship
- 2015 South American Championship
- 2016 FIVB World League
- 2016 Olympic Games
- 2017 FIVB World Grand Champions Cup
- 2017 FIVB World League
- 2017 South American Championship
- 2018 FIVB World Championship
- 2019 FIVB World Cup
- 2021 Nations League
- 2021 South American Championship
- 2022 FIVB World Championship
- 2023 South American Championship

=== Individual ===
- 2006 Superliga Brasileira – Best Setter
- 2007 Superliga Brasileira – Best Setter
- 2007 America's Cup – Best Setter
- 2008 Superliga Brasileira – Best Setter
- 2008 America's Cup – Best Setter
- 2009 Superliga Brasileira – Best Setter
- 2009 FIVB World Grand Champions Cup – Best Setter
- 2013 FIVB World League – Best Setter
- 2013 South American Championship – Best Setter
- 2013 FIVB World Grand Champions Cup – Best Setter
- 2015 South American Championship – Best Setter
- 2016 Olympic Games – Best Setter
- 2017 South American Championship – Best Setter
- 2019 FIVB Club World Championship – Most Valuable Player
- 2019 FIVB Club World Championship – Best Setter
- 2021 South American Championship – Most Valuable Player
- 2021 South American Championship – Best Setter

Awards
Preceded by (Brazil) Ricardo Garcia	Best Setter of World Grand Champions Cup; 2009; 2013	Succeeded by (Italy) Simone Giannelli
Preceded by (Bulgaria) Georgi Bratoev	Best Setter of FIVB World League; 2013	Succeeded by (Iran) Saeid Marouf
Preceded by (Argentina) Luciano De Cecco	Best Setter of South American Championship; 2013; 2015; 2017; 2021	Succeeded by (Argentina) Luciano De Cecco
Preceded by (Bulgaria) Georgi Bratoev	Best Setter of Olympic Games; 2016	Succeeded by (Argentina) Luciano De Cecco
Olympic Games
Preceded by Edson Bindilatti	Flagbearer for Brazil; Tokyo 2020 with Ketleyn Quadros	Succeeded by Edson Bindilatti; Jaqueline Mourão
