= 2017 FIVB Volleyball Men's World Grand Champions Cup squads =

This article shows the rosters of all participating teams at the 2017 FIVB Men's World Champions Cup in Osaka and Nagoya, Japan.

== Brazil ==
The following is the Brazilian roster in the 2017 FIVB Men's World Champions Cup.

Head coach: Renan Dal Zotto

No.	Name	Date of birth	Height	Weight	Spike	Block	2016–17 club
1	Bruno Rezende (C)	2 July 1986	1.90 m (6 ft 3 in)	76 kg (168 lb)	323 cm (127 in)	302 cm (119 in)	(Brazil) SESI São Paulo
2	Isac Santos	13 December 1990	2.08 m (6 ft 10 in)	99 kg (218 lb)	360 cm (140 in)	339 cm (133 in)	(Brazil) Sada Cruzeiro
6	Tiago Brendle (L)	21 October 1985	1.88 m (6 ft 2 in)	83 kg (183 lb)	315 cm (124 in)	300 cm (120 in)	(Brazil) Brasil Kirin Campinas
8	Wallace de Souza	26 June 1987	1.98 m (6 ft 6 in)	87 kg (192 lb)	344 cm (135 in)	318 cm (125 in)	(Brazil) Funvic Taubaté
9	Raphael Vieira de Oliveira	14 June 1979	1.90 m (6 ft 3 in)	82 kg (181 lb)	330 cm (130 in)	306 cm (120 in)	(Brazil) Funvic Taubaté
10	Otávio Pinto	27 February 1991	2.00 m (6 ft 7 in)	85 kg (187 lb)	347 cm (137 in)	319 cm (126 in)	(Brazil) Funvic Taubaté
11	Rodrigo Leão	5 June 1996	1.97 m (6 ft 6 in)	85 kg (187 lb)	331 cm (130 in)	316 cm (124 in)	(Brazil) Sada Cruzeiro
13	Maurício Souza	29 September 1988	2.09 m (6 ft 10 in)	93 kg (205 lb)	344 cm (135 in)	323 cm (127 in)	(Brazil) Brasil Kirin Campinas
14	Douglas Souza	20 August 1995	1.99 m (6 ft 6 in)	75 kg (165 lb)	338 cm (133 in)	317 cm (125 in)	(Brazil) SESI São Paulo
16	Lucas Saatkamp	6 March 1986	2.09 m (6 ft 10 in)	101 kg (223 lb)	340 cm (130 in)	321 cm (126 in)	(Brazil) SESI São Paulo
17	Thales Hoss (L)	26 April 1989	1.90 m (6 ft 3 in)	74 kg (163 lb)	329 cm (130 in)	303 cm (119 in)	(Brazil) Vôlei Canoas
18	Ricardo Lucarelli	14 February 1992	1.96 m (6 ft 5 in)	87 kg (192 lb)	348 cm (137 in)	326 cm (128 in)	(Brazil) Funvic Taubaté
19	Maurício Borges Silva	4 February 1989	1.99 m (6 ft 6 in)	99 kg (218 lb)	335 cm (132 in)	315 cm (124 in)	(Turkey) Arkas İzmir
20	Renan Zanatta Buiatti	10 January 1990	2.17 m (7 ft 1 in)	105 kg (231 lb)	350 cm (140 in)	314 cm (124 in)	(Brazil) Juiz de Fora

== France ==
The following is the French roster in the 2017 FIVB Men's World Champions Cup.

Head coach: Laurent Tillie

No.	Name	Date of birth	Height	Weight	Spike	Block	2016–17 club
2	Jenia Grebennikov (L)	13 August 1990	1.88 m (6 ft 2 in)	85 kg (187 lb)	345 cm (136 in)	330 cm (130 in)	(Italy) Cucine Lube Civitanova
4	Jean Patry	27 December 1996	2.08 m (6 ft 10 in)	94 kg (207 lb)	337 cm (133 in)	314 cm (124 in)	(France) Montpellier UC
5	Trévor Clévenot	28 June 1994	1.99 m (6 ft 6 in)	89 kg (196 lb)	335 cm (132 in)	316 cm (124 in)	(Italy) LRP Piacenza
6	Benjamin Toniutti (C)	30 October 1989	1.83 m (6 ft 0 in)	73 kg (161 lb)	320 cm (130 in)	300 cm (120 in)	(Poland) ZAKSA Kędzierzyn-Koźle
7	Kévin Tillie (L)	2 November 1990	2.00 m (6 ft 7 in)	85 kg (187 lb)	345 cm (136 in)	325 cm (128 in)	(Poland) ZAKSA Kędzierzyn-Koźle
8	Julien Lyneel	15 April 1990	1.91 m (6 ft 3 in)	87 kg (192 lb)	345 cm (136 in)	325 cm (128 in)	(Italy) Bunge Ravenna
11	Antoine Brizard	22 May 1994	1.94 m (6 ft 4 in)	96 kg (212 lb)	340 cm (130 in)	310 cm (120 in)	(France) Spacer's Toulouse
12	Stéphen Boyer	10 April 1996	1.96 m (6 ft 5 in)	85 kg (187 lb)	335 cm (132 in)	314 cm (124 in)	(France) Chaumont 52
14	Nicolas Le Goff	15 February 1992	2.06 m (6 ft 9 in)	115 kg (254 lb)	365 cm (144 in)	328 cm (129 in)	(Turkey) İstanbul BBSK
16	Daryl Bultor	17 November 1995	2.02 m (6 ft 8 in)	94 kg (207 lb)	342 cm (135 in)	317 cm (125 in)	(France) Montpellier UC
18	Thibault Rossard	28 August 1993	1.93 m (6 ft 4 in)	85 kg (187 lb)	350 cm (140 in)	320 cm (130 in)	(Poland) Asseco Resovia Rzeszów
21	Barthélémy Chinenyeze	28 February 1998	2.01 m (6 ft 7 in)	81 kg (179 lb)	357 cm (141 in)	332 cm (131 in)	(France) Spacer's Toulouse

== Iran ==
The following is the Iranian roster in the 2017 FIVB Men's World Champions Cup.

Head coach: Igor Kolaković

No.	Name	Date of birth	Height	Weight	Spike	Block	2016–17 club
1	Farhad Salafzoun	6 December 1992	2.00 m (6 ft 7 in)	81 kg (179 lb)	320 cm (130 in)	313 cm (123 in)	(Iran) Matin Varamin
2	Milad Ebadipour	17 October 1993	1.96 m (6 ft 5 in)	78 kg (172 lb)	350 cm (140 in)	310 cm (120 in)	(Iran) Shahrdari Urmia
3	Saman Faezi	23 August 1991	2.04 m (6 ft 8 in)	87 kg (192 lb)	343 cm (135 in)	335 cm (132 in)	(Iran) Paykan Tehran
4	Saeid Marouf (C)	20 October 1985	1.89 m (6 ft 2 in)	81 kg (179 lb)	331 cm (130 in)	311 cm (122 in)	(Iran) Shahrdari Urmia
5	Farhad Ghaemi	28 August 1989	1.97 m (6 ft 6 in)	73 kg (161 lb)	355 cm (140 in)	335 cm (132 in)	(Iran) Paykan Tehran
6	Mohammad Mousavi	22 August 1987	2.03 m (6 ft 8 in)	86 kg (190 lb)	362 cm (143 in)	344 cm (135 in)	(Iran) Sarmayeh Bank Tehran
8	Mostafa Heidari (L)	14 December 1991	1.75 m (5 ft 9 in)	68 kg (150 lb)	263 cm (104 in)	259 cm (102 in)	(Iran) Saipa Tehran
10	Amir Ghafour	6 June 1991	2.02 m (6 ft 8 in)	90 kg (200 lb)	354 cm (139 in)	334 cm (131 in)	(Iran) Paykan Tehran
11	Farhad Nazari Afshar	22 May 1984	1.95 m (6 ft 5 in)	93 kg (205 lb)	320 cm (130 in)	308 cm (121 in)	(Iran) Paykan Tehran
12	Mojtaba Mirzajanpour	7 October 1991	2.05 m (6 ft 9 in)	88 kg (194 lb)	355 cm (140 in)	348 cm (137 in)	(Iran) Paykan Tehran
14	Mohammad Javad Manavinejad	27 November 1995	2.00 m (6 ft 7 in)	84 kg (185 lb)	340 cm (130 in)	320 cm (130 in)	(Iran) Paykan Tehran
17	Reza Ghara	31 July 1991	2.00 m (6 ft 7 in)	87 kg (192 lb)	351 cm (138 in)	331 cm (130 in)	(Iran) Kalleh Mazandaran
19	Mehdi Marandi (L)	12 May 1986	1.72 m (5 ft 8 in)	69 kg (152 lb)	295 cm (116 in)	280 cm (110 in)	(Iran) Paykan Tehran
20	Masoud Gholami	2 April 1990	2.04 m (6 ft 8 in)	93 kg (205 lb)	349 cm (137 in)	331 cm (130 in)	(Iran) Saipa Tehran

== Italy ==
The following is the Italian roster in the 2017 FIVB Men's World Champions Cup.

Head coach: Gianlorenzo Blengini

No.	Name	Date of birth	Height	Weight	Spike	Block	2016–17 club
2	Luigi Randazzo	30 April 1994	1.98 m (6 ft 6 in)	97 kg (214 lb)	352 cm (139 in)	255 cm (100 in)	(Italy) Calzedonia Verona
4	Luca Vettori	26 April 1991	2.00 m (6 ft 7 in)	95 kg (209 lb)	345 cm (136 in)	323 cm (127 in)	(Italy) Azimut Modena
5	Luca Spirito	30 October 1993	1.96 m (6 ft 5 in)	79 kg (174 lb)	338 cm (133 in)	262 cm (103 in)	(Italy) Bunge Ravenna
6	Simone Giannelli	9 August 1996	1.98 m (6 ft 6 in)	92 kg (203 lb)	350 cm (140 in)	330 cm (130 in)	(Italy) Diatec Trentino
7	Fabio Balaso (L)	20 October 1995	1.78 m (5 ft 10 in)	73 kg (161 lb)	305 cm (120 in)	280 cm (110 in)	(Italy) Kioene Padova
9	Daniele Mazzone	4 June 1992	2.08 m (6 ft 10 in)	88 kg (194 lb)	315 cm (124 in)	309 cm (122 in)	(Italy) Diatec Trentino
10	Filippo Lanza	3 March 1991	1.98 m (6 ft 6 in)	98 kg (216 lb)	350 cm (140 in)	330 cm (130 in)	(Italy) Diatec Trentino
11	Simone Buti (C)	19 September 1983	2.06 m (6 ft 9 in)	100 kg (220 lb)	346 cm (136 in)	328 cm (129 in)	(Italy) Sir Sicoma Colussi Perugia
13	Massimo Colaci (L)	21 February 1985	1.80 m (5 ft 11 in)	75 kg (165 lb)	314 cm (124 in)	306 cm (120 in)	(Italy) Diatec Trentino
14	Matteo Piano	24 October 1990	2.08 m (6 ft 10 in)	102 kg (225 lb)	352 cm (139 in)	325 cm (128 in)	(Italy) Azimut Modena
16	Oleg Antonov	28 July 1988	1.98 m (6 ft 6 in)	88 kg (194 lb)	340 cm (130 in)	310 cm (120 in)	(Italy) Diatec Trentino
17	Iacopo Botto	22 September 1987	1.91 m (6 ft 3 in)	76 kg (168 lb)	345 cm (136 in)	320 cm (130 in)	(Italy) Gi Group Monza
18	Giulio Sabbi	10 August 1989	2.01 m (6 ft 7 in)	92 kg (203 lb)	352 cm (139 in)	325 cm (128 in)	(Italy) Exprivia Molfetta
19	Fabio Ricci	11 July 1994	2.04 m (6 ft 8 in)	96 kg (212 lb)	348 cm (137 in)	272 cm (107 in)	(Italy) Bunge Ravenna

== Japan ==
The following is the Japanese roster in the 2017 FIVB Men's World Champions Cup.

Head coach: Yuichi Nakagaichi

No.	Name	Date of birth	Height	Weight	Spike	Block	2016–17 club
1	Issei Otake	3 December 1995	2.00 m (6 ft 7 in)	100 kg (220 lb)	330 cm (130 in)	320 cm (130 in)	(Japan) Chuo University
2	Hideomi Fukatsu (C)	1 June 1990	1.80 m (5 ft 11 in)	70 kg (150 lb)	330 cm (130 in)	305 cm (120 in)	(Japan) Panasonic Panthers
3	Naonobu Fujii	5 January 1992	1.83 m (6 ft 0 in)	78 kg (172 lb)	320 cm (130 in)	305 cm (120 in)	(Japan) Toray Arrows
6	Akihiro Yamauchi	30 November 1993	2.04 m (6 ft 8 in)	72 kg (159 lb)	348 cm (137 in)	328 cm (129 in)	(Japan) Panasonic Panthers
7	Takashi Dekita	13 August 1991	1.99 m (6 ft 6 in)	92 kg (203 lb)	350 cm (140 in)	330 cm (130 in)	(Japan) Osaka Blazers Sakai
8	Masahiro Yanagida	6 July 1992	1.86 m (6 ft 1 in)	78 kg (172 lb)	335 cm (132 in)	305 cm (120 in)	(Japan) Suntory Sunbirds
9	Masashi Kuriyama (L)	14 July 1988	1.90 m (6 ft 3 in)	89 kg (196 lb)	340 cm (130 in)	330 cm (130 in)	(Japan) Suntory Sunbirds
10	Shuzo Yamada	27 November 1992	1.93 m (6 ft 4 in)	78 kg (172 lb)	340 cm (130 in)	323 cm (127 in)	(Japan) Toyoda Gosei Trefuerza
12	Shohei Yamamoto	21 March 1991	1.87 m (6 ft 2 in)	68 kg (150 lb)	333 cm (131 in)	320 cm (130 in)	(Japan) JT Thunders
14	Yūki Ishikawa	11 December 1995	1.91 m (6 ft 3 in)	82 kg (181 lb)	345 cm (136 in)	330 cm (130 in)	(Japan) Chuo University
15	Haku Ri	27 December 1990	1.94 m (6 ft 4 in)	83 kg (183 lb)	347 cm (137 in)	325 cm (128 in)	(Japan) Toray Arrows
16	Kentaro Takahashi	8 February 1995	2.01 m (6 ft 7 in)	93 kg (205 lb)	345 cm (136 in)	330 cm (130 in)	(Japan) Toray Arrows
18	Taishi Onodera	27 February 1996	2.01 m (6 ft 7 in)	97 kg (214 lb)	330 cm (130 in)	320 cm (130 in)	(Japan) Tokai University
19	Hiroaki Asano (L)	6 October 1990	1.78 m (5 ft 10 in)	69 kg (152 lb)	335 cm (132 in)	315 cm (124 in)	(Japan) JTEKT Stings

== United States ==
The following is the American roster in the 2017 FIVB Men's World Champions Cup.

Head coach: John Speraw

No.	Name	Date of birth	Height	Weight	Spike	Block	2016–17 club
1	Matthew Anderson	18 April 1987	2.08 m (6 ft 10 in)	100 kg (220 lb)	360 cm (140 in)	332 cm (131 in)	(Russia) VC Zenit-Kazan
2	Aaron Russell	4 June 1993	2.05 m (6 ft 9 in)	98 kg (216 lb)	356 cm (140 in)	337 cm (133 in)	(Italy) Sir Safety Umbria Volley
3	Taylor Sander	17 March 1992	1.96 m (6 ft 5 in)	80 kg (180 lb)	345 cm (136 in)	320 cm (130 in)	(Qatar) Al Arabi
4	Jeffrey Jendryk	15 September 1995	2.08 m (6 ft 10 in)	89 kg (196 lb)	353 cm (139 in)	345 cm (136 in)	(United States) Loyola University Chicago
7	Kawika Shoji	11 November 1987	1.90 m (6 ft 3 in)	79 kg (174 lb)	331 cm (130 in)	315 cm (124 in)	(Russia) Lokomotiv Novosibirsk
10	Thomas Jaeschke	4 September 1993	1.98 m (6 ft 6 in)	84 kg (185 lb)	348 cm (137 in)	330 cm (130 in)	(Poland) Asseco Resovia Rzeszów
11	Micah Christenson	8 May 1993	1.98 m (6 ft 6 in)	88 kg (194 lb)	349 cm (137 in)	340 cm (130 in)	(Italy) Cucine Lube Civitanova
14	Benjamin Patch	21 June 1994	2.03 m (6 ft 8 in)	90 kg (200 lb)	368 cm (145 in)	348 cm (137 in)	(United States) Brigham Young University
15	Carson Clark	20 January 1989	2.05 m (6 ft 9 in)	93 kg (205 lb)	365 cm (144 in)	360 cm (140 in)	Free agent
17	Maxwell Holt	12 March 1987	2.05 m (6 ft 9 in)	90 kg (200 lb)	351 cm (138 in)	333 cm (131 in)	(Italy) Modena Volley
19	Taylor Averill	3 May 1992	2.01 m (6 ft 7 in)	94 kg (207 lb)	370 cm (150 in)	330 cm (130 in)	(Italy) Kioene Padova
20	David Smith (C)	15 May 1985	2.01 m (6 ft 7 in)	86 kg (190 lb)	348 cm (137 in)	314 cm (124 in)	(Poland) Czarni Radom
21	Dustin Watten (L)	27 October 1986	1.82 m (6 ft 0 in)	80 kg (180 lb)	306 cm (120 in)	295 cm (116 in)	(Poland) Czarni Radom
22	Erik Shoji (L)	24 August 1989	1.84 m (6 ft 0 in)	83 kg (183 lb)	330 cm (130 in)	321 cm (126 in)	(Russia) Lokomotiv Novosibirsk

== See also ==
- 2017 FIVB Volleyball Women's World Grand Champions Cup squads
