= Thales Hoss =

Brazilian volleyball player (born 1989)

Personal information
- Full name: Thales Gustavo Hoss
- Born: 26 April 1989 (age 37); São Leopoldo, Brazil
- Height: 1.90 m (6 ft 3 in)

Volleyball information
- Position: Libero
- Current club: Avia Świdnik

Career
Years	Teams
2007–2008; 2008–2009; 2009–2013; 2013–2014; 2014–2015; 2015–2016; 2016–2017; 2017–2022; 2022–2023; 2023–2026; 2026–	Sport Club Ulbra; Sada Cruzeiro; Floripa Esporte Clube; JF Vôlei; SESI São Paulo; Voleisul/Paquetá Esportes; Canoas Vôlei; Vôlei Natal; Chaumont VB 52; LUK Lublin; Avia Świdnik

National team
2017–	Brazil
Honours
Men's volleyball
Representing Brazil
FIVB World Championship
Silver medal – second place	2018 Italy/Bulgaria
Bronze medal – third place	2022 Poland/Slovenia
FIVB World Cup
Gold medal – first place	2019 Japan
FIVB World Grand Champions Cup
Gold medal – first place	2017 Japan
FIVB Nations League
Gold medal – first place	2021 Rimini
FIVB World League
Silver medal – second place	2017 Curitiba
CSV South American Championship
Gold medal – first place	2017 Chile
Gold medal – first place	2019 Chile
Gold medal – first place	2021 Brasília
Silver medal – second place	2023 Recife

Thales Gustavo Hoss (born 26 April 1989) is a Brazilian professional volleyball player who plays as a libero for Avia Świdnik and the Brazil national team. Hoss won a silver medal at the 2018 World Championship representing Brazil.

== Honours ==
=== Club ===
- CSV South American Club Championship
  - Florianópolis 2009 – with Cimed Florianópolis
  - Argentina 2010 – with Cimed Florianópolis
- CEV Challenge Cup
  - 2024–25 – with Bogdanka LUK Lublin
- Domestic
  - 2009–10 Brazilian Championship, with Cimed Florianópolis
  - 2018–19 Brazilian Championship, with Vôlei Taubaté
  - 2019–20 Brazilian SuperCup, with Vôlei Taubaté
  - 2020–21 Brazilian SuperCup, with Vôlei Taubaté
  - 2024–25 Polish Championship, with Bogdanka LUK Lublin
  - 2025–26 Polish SuperCup, with Bogdanka LUK Lublin
  - 2025–26 Polish Cup, with Bogdanka LUK Lublin

=== Youth national team ===
- 2006 CSV U19 South American Championship
- 2008 CSV U21 South American Championship
- 2009 FIVB U21 World Championship

=== Individual awards ===
- 2006: CSV U19 South American Championship – Best libero
- 2006: CSV U19 South American Championship – Best receiver
- 2006: CSV U19 South American Championship – Best digger
- 2010: CSV South American Club Championship – Best receiver
- 2010: CSV South American Club Championship – Best libero
- 2019: FIVB World Cup – Best libero
- 2021: FIVB Nations League – Best libero
- 2023: CSV South American Championship – Best libero
- 2026: Polish Cup – Best libero

Awards
Preceded by (United States) Erik Shoji	Best Libero of FIVB World Cup; 2019	Succeeded by Incumbent
Preceded by (United States) Erik Shoji	Best Libero of FIVB Nations League; 2021	Succeeded by (France) Jenia Grebennikov
