= Éder Carbonera =

Brazilian volleyball player (born 1983)

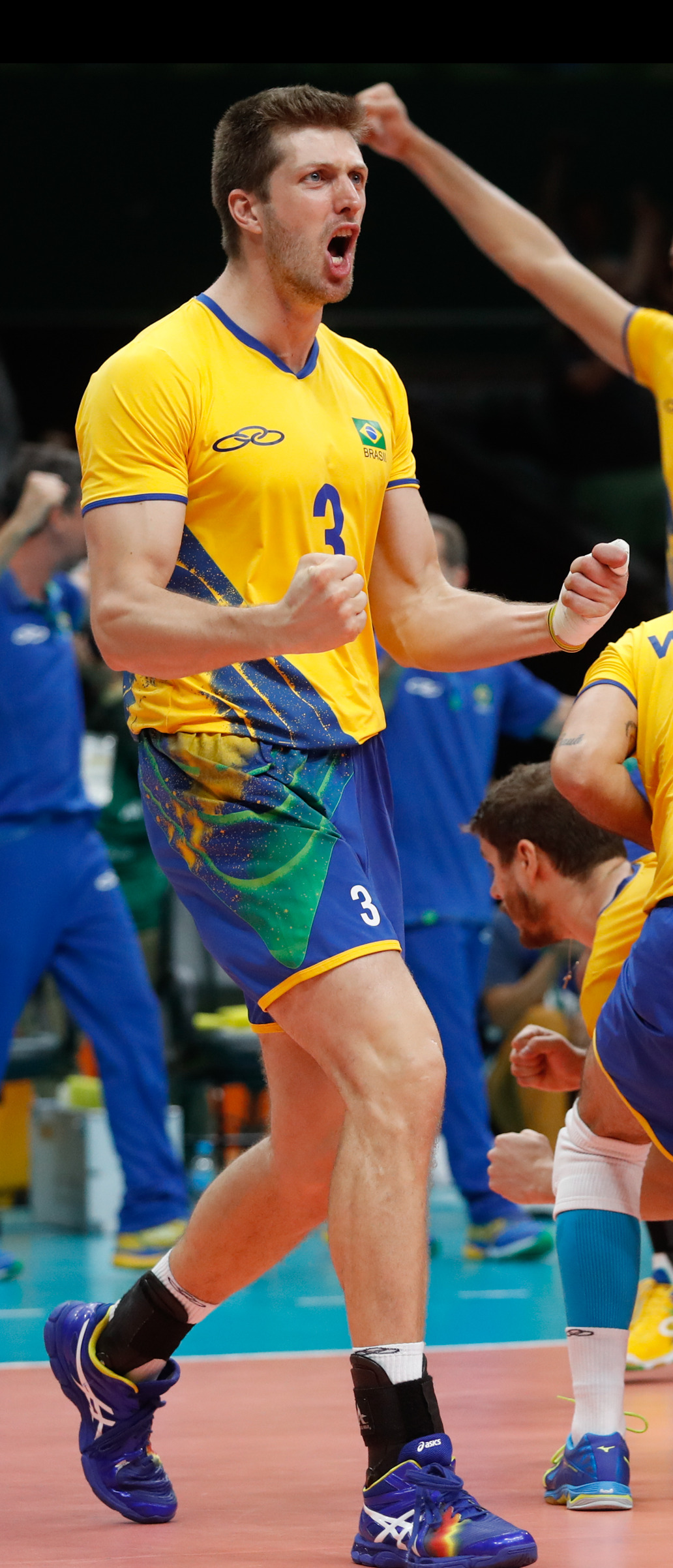
- Carbonera at the 2016 Olympics

Personal information
- Full name: Éder Francis Carbonera
- Nationality: Brazilian
- Born: 19 October 1983 (age 43) Farroupilha, Rio Grande do Sul
- Education: Universidade de Caxias do Sul
- Height: 2.05 m (6 ft 9 in)
- Weight: 107 kg (236 lb)
- Spike: 360 cm (142 in)
- Block: 330 cm (130 in)

Volleyball information
- Position: Middle blocker
- Current club: SESI São Paulo
- Number: 3

Career
- Years: Team
- 2004–2005: UCS Sogipa
- 2005–2012: Cimed Florianópolis
- 2012–2013: SESI São Paulo
- 2013–2016: Sada Cruzeiro
- 2016–2017: Funvic Taubaté
- 2017–2018: Diatec Trentino
- 2018–: SESI São Paulo

National team
- Years: Team
- 2007–: Brazil
Honours
Men's volleyball
Representing Brazil
Olympic Games
Gold medal – first place	2016 Rio de Janeiro	Team
World Championship
Silver medal – second place	2014 Poland	Team
Silver medal – second place	2018 Italy-Bulgaria	Team
World Grand Champions Cup
Gold medal – first place	2013 Japan	Team
World League
Gold medal – first place	2007 Katowice	Team
Gold medal – first place	2009 Belgrade	Team
Silver medal – second place	2011 Gdańsk	Team
Silver medal – second place	2013 Mar del Plata	Team
Silver medal – second place	2014 Florence	Team
Silver medal – second place	2016 Kraków	Team
Silver medal – second place	2017 Curitiba	Team
Pan American Games
Gold medal – first place	2011 Guadalajara	Team
Bronze medal – third place	2019 Lima	Team
Summer Universiade
Bronze medal – third place	2011 Shenzhen
- Updated on 21 August 2016

Éder Francis Carbonera (born 19 October 1983) is a Brazilian volleyball player and Olympic gold medalist. Carbonera helped the Brazilian national volleyball team win the gold medal in the 2009 World League. He also helped the Brazilian team win a silver medal at the 2014 World Championship and a gold medal at the 2016 Summer Olympics.

== Sporting achievements ==
=== Clubs ===
- 2005/2006 Brazilian Superliga, with Cimed Florianópolis
- 2007/2008 Brazilian Superliga, with Cimed Florianópolis
- 2008/2009 Brazilian Superliga, with Cimed Florianópolis
- 2009/2010 Brazilian Superliga, with Cimed Florianópolis
- 2013/2014 Brazilian Superliga, with Sada Cruzeiro
- 2014/2015 Brazilian Superliga, with Sada Cruzeiro
- 2015/2016 Brazilian Superliga, with Sada Cruzeiro

==== South American Club Championship ====
- 2009 – with Cimed Florianópolis
- 2014 – with Sada Cruzeiro
- 2016 – with Sada Cruzeiro

==== FIVB Club World Championship ====
- 2013 – with Sada Cruzeiro
- 2015 – with Sada Cruzeiro

=== Individual ===
- 2006/07 Brazilian Superliga – Best Blocker
- 2018/19 Brazilian Superliga – Best Middle Blocker
