= Raphael Vieira de Oliveira =

Brazilian volleyball player

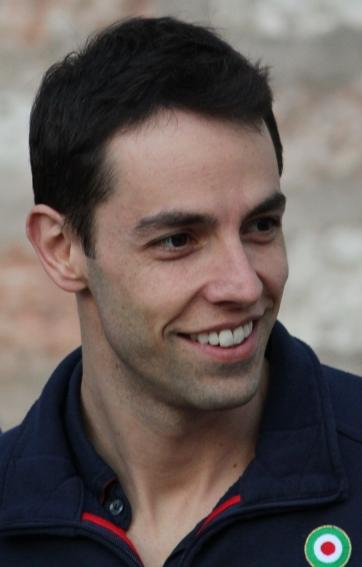

Personal information
- Full name: Raphael Vieira de Oliveira
- Nickname: Rapha
- Born: June 14, 1979 (age 47); São João del Rei, Brazil
- Height: 1.90 m (6 ft 3 in)
- Weight: 86 kg (190 lb)
- Spike: 317 cm (125 in)
- Block: 306 cm (120 in)

Volleyball information
- Position: Setter
- Number: Sada Cruzeiro Vôlei

Career
| Years | Teams |
|---|---|
| 1993–2001 | EC Banespa |
| 2001–2002 | Bunge Barão |
| 2002–2004 | Ulbra São Paulo |
| 2004–2006 | Zenit Kazan |
| 2006–2009 | Tonno Callipo Vibo Valentia |
| 2009–2013 | Trentino Volley |
| 2013–2014 | Halkbank Ankara |
| 2014–2022 | Funvic Taubaté |
| 2022–2023 | BluVolley Verona |
| 2026– | Sada Cruzeiro Vôlei |

National team
| 2005–2017 | Brazil |
Honours
Men's volleyball
Representing Brazil
World Championship
| Silver medal – second place | 2014 Poland | Team |
World Grand Champions Cup
| Gold medal – first place | 2013 Japan | Team |
| Gold medal – first place | 2017 Japan | Team |
World League
| Silver medal – second place | 2014 Florence | Team |
| Silver medal – second place | 2017 Curitiba | Team |
South American Championship
| Gold medal – first place | 2005 Lages |
| Gold medal – first place | 2009 Bogotá |
| Gold medal – first place | 2015 Maceió |
| Gold medal – first place | 2017 Santiago/Temuco |
- Last updated: 26 February 2017

Raphael Vieira de Oliveira (born 14 June 1979) is a former Brazilian volleyball player, a former member of Brazil men's national volleyball team and Italian club BluVolley Verona, a silver medalist of the 2014 World Championship, South American Champion (2005, 2009, 2015).

== Sporting achievements ==
=== CEV Champions League ===
- 2009/2010 - with Itas Diatec Trentino
- 2010/2011 - with Itas Diatec Trentino
- 2011/2012 - with Itas Diatec Trentino
- 2013/2014 - with Halkbank Ankara

=== FIVB Club World Championship ===
- Qatar 2009 - with Itas Diatec Trentino
- Qatar 2010 - with Itas Diatec Trentino
- Qatar 2011 - with Itas Diatec Trentino
- Qatar 2012 - with Itas Diatec Trentino

==== South American Club Championship ====
- 2016 Brazil, with Funvic Taubaté
- 2020 – with Funvic Taubaté

=== National championship ===
- 2002/2003 Brazilian Cup, with Ulbra São Paulo
- 2002/2003 Brazilian Championship, with Ulbra São Paulo
- 2005/2006 Russian Cup, with VC Zenit Kazan
- 2009/2010 Italian Cup Serie A, with Itas Diatec Trentino
- 2009/2010 Italian Championship, with Itas Diatec Trentino
- 2010/2011 Italian Championship, with Itas Diatec Trentino
- 2011/2012 Italian Cup Serie A, with Itas Diatec Trentino
- 2011/2012 Italian Championship, with Itas Diatec Trentino
- 2012/2013 Italian Cup Serie A, with Itas DiatescTrentino
- 2012/2013 Italian Championship, with Itas Diatec Trentino
- 2013/2014 Turkish SuperCup 2013, with Halkbank Ankara
- 2013/2014 Turkish Championship, with Halkbank Ankara
- 2014/2015 Brazilian Cup, with Funvic Taubaté
- 2014/2015 Brazilian Championship, with Funvic Taubaté
- 2015/2016 Brazilian Championship, with Funvic Taubaté
- 2016/2017 Brazilian Cup, with Funvic Taubaté
- 2018/2019 Brazilian Superliga, with Funvic Taubaté

=== National team ===
- 2005 South American Championship
- 2009 South American Championship
- 2013 FIVB World Grand Champions Cup
- 2014 FIVB World League
- 2014 FIVB World Championship
- 2015 South American Championship

=== Individually ===
- 2009 FIVB Club World Championship - Best Setter
- 2010 FIVB Club World Championship - Best Setter
- 2011 FIVB Club World Championship - Best Setter
- 2014 CEV Champions League - Best Setter
- 2014 FIVB Club World Championship - Best Setter

Awards
| Preceded by – | Best Setter of FIVB Club World Championship (2009, 2010, 2011) | Succeeded by (Brazil) William Arjona |
| Preceded by (Russia) Aleksandr Butko | Best Setter of CEV Champions League (2013/2014) | Succeeded by (Poland) Fabian Drzyzga |
| Preceded by (Brazil) William Arjona | Best Setter of FIVB Club World Championship (2014) | Succeeded by (Brazil) William Arjona |
