= Robinson Dvoranen =

Brazilian volleyball player (born 1983)

Personal information
- Full name: Robinson Alessandro Dvoranen
- Nickname: Bob
- Nationality: (Brazil) Brazilian
- Born: 23 December 1983 (age 42); Maringá, Brazil
- Height: 201 cm (6 ft 7 in)
- Weight: 90 kg (198 lb)
- Spike: 340 cm (134 in)

Volleyball information
- Position: Outside hitter
- Current club: (Portugal) Sporting CP

Career
Years	Teams
2002–2003; 2003–2004; 2004–2005; 2005–2009; 2009–2010; 2010–2011; 2011–2012; 2012–2013; 2013; 2013; 2014; 2014–2015; 2015–2017; 2017–2019; 2019–2020; 2020–	(Brazil) ECUS (Brazil) Clube Náutico Araraquara (Brazil) Unisul Esporte Clube (Brazil) Sport Club Ulbra (Brazil) Sada Cruzeiro (Italy) BCC-NEP Castellana Grotte (Brazil) Vôlei Futuro (Romania) Remat Zalău (Indonesia) Jakarta Pertamina Energi (Brazil) Montes Claros Vôlei (Iran) Shahrdari Tabriz VC (Brazil) São José Vôlei (Brazil) Montes Claros Vôlei (Brazil) Minas Tênis Clube (Poland) Cuprum Lubin (Portugal) Sporting CP

Robinson Dvoranen (born 23 December 1983) is a Brazilian volleyball player.

== Sporting achievements ==
- National championships
  - 2002/2003 Brazilian Championship, with ECUS
  - 2006/2007 Brazilian Championship, with Sport Club Ulbra
  - 2007/2008 Brazilian Championship, with Sport Club Ulbra
  - 2011/2012 Brazilian Championship, with Vôlei Futuro
  - 2012/2013 Romanian Championship, with Remat Zalău

=== Individually ===
- 2016/2017: Brazilian Championship - The Best Receiver
