= Leandro Vissotto =

Brazilian volleyball player

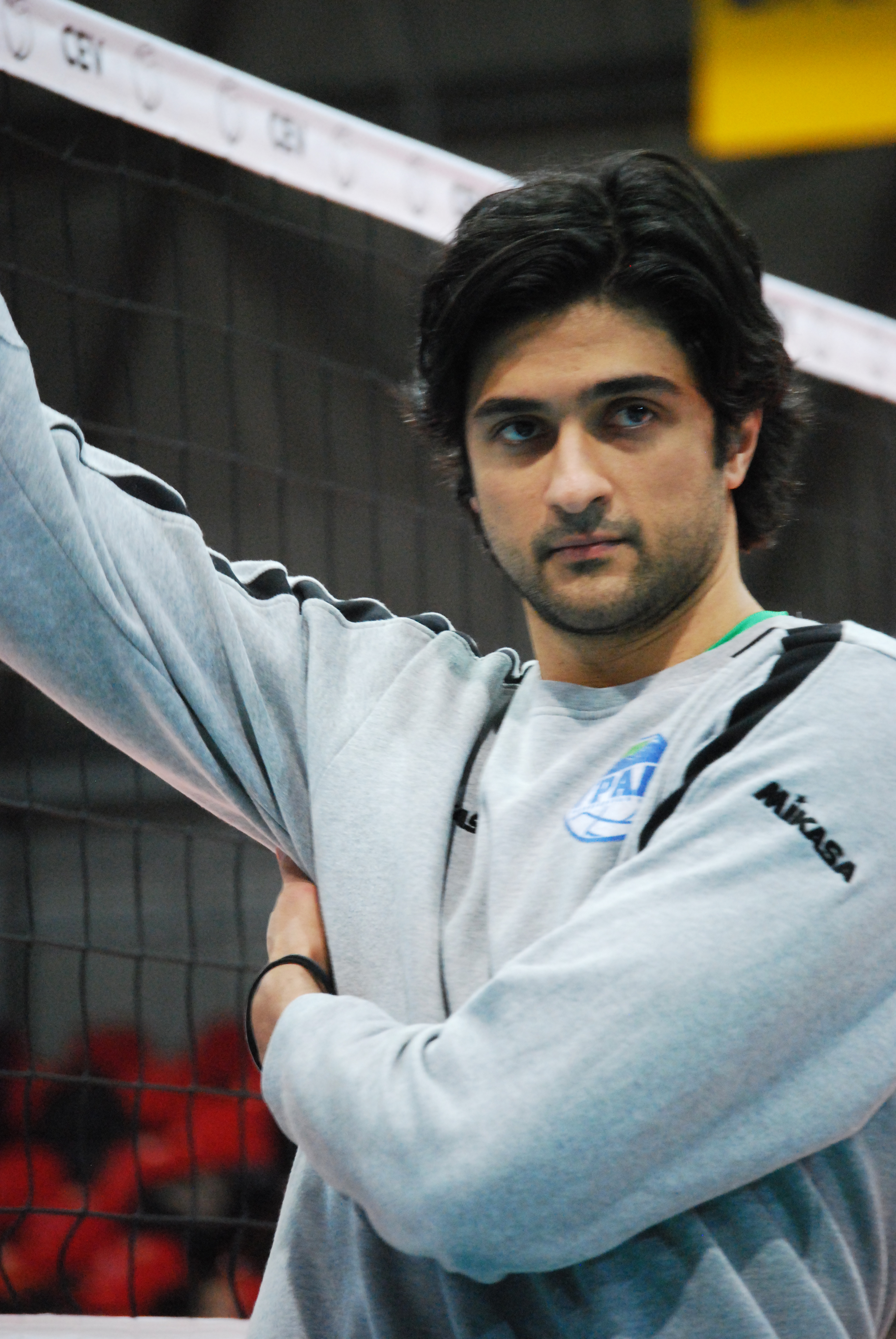

Personal information
- Full name: Leandro Vissotto Neves
- Born: April 30, 1983 (age 43); Rio de Janeiro, Brazil
- Height: 2.14 m (7 ft 0 in)
- Weight: 115 kg (254 lb)
- Spike: 378 cm (149 in)
- Block: 348 cm (137 in)

Volleyball information
- Position: Opposite spiker
- Current team: Funvic Taubaté
- Number: 8

Career
Years	Teams
1999–2000	Flamengo
2000–2002	EC Unisul
2002–2004	EC União Suzano
2004–2005	EC Unisul
2005–2006	Minas Tênis Clube
2006–2007	Top Volley Latina
2007–2008	Taranto Volley
2008–2010	Itas Diatec Trentino
2010–2011	Vôlei Futuro
2011–2012	Bre Banca Lannutti Cuneo
2012–2013	Ural Ufa
2013–2014	Rio de Janeiro Vôlei
2014–2014	Suwon KEPCO Vixtorm
2014–2016	JT Thunders
2016	Al Arabi
2016–2017	Gi Group Monza
2017–2018	Vôlei Renata
2018–2020	Funvic Taubaté

National team
2001–2016	Brazil
Honours
Men's volleyball
Representing Brazil
Event	1st	2nd	3rd
Olympic Games	0	1	0
World Championship	1	1	0
World Cup	0	0	1
World Grand Champions Cup	1	0	0
World League	4	3	0
South American Championship	2	0	0
Total	8	5	1
Olympic Games
Silver medal – second place	2012 London	Team
World Championship
Gold medal – first place	2010 Italy	Team
Silver medal – second place	2014 Poland	Team
World Cup
Bronze medal – third place	2011 Japan	Team
World Grand Champions Cup
Gold medal – first place	2009 Japan	Team
World League
Gold medal – first place	2003 Madrid	Team
Gold medal – first place	2006 Moscow	Team
Gold medal – first place	2009 Belgrade	Team
Gold medal – first place	2010 Córdoba	Team
Silver medal – second place	2011 Gdańsk	Team
Silver medal – second place	2013 Mar del Plata	Team
Silver medal – second place	2014 Florence	Team
South American Championship
Gold medal – first place	2009 Bogotá	Team
Gold medal – first place	2013 Cabo Frio	Team
- Last updated: 8 September 2018

Leandro Vissotto Neves (born 30 April 1983) is a Brazilian volleyball player, a member of Brazil men's national volleyball team and Brazilian club EMS Taubaté Funvic. Vissotto is a winner silver medalist of the Olympic Games London 2012, World Champion 2010, silver medalist of the 2014 World Championship, bronze medalist of the 2011 World Cup, multimedalist of the World League, 2015 Japanese Champion, 2018 Brazilian Superliga Champion and MVP of final.

== Personal life ==
Vissotto was born in Rio de Janeiro, Brazil. He is married to Nathalia. In August 2010 his wife gave birth to their first child, a daughter named Catharina. On September 7, 2013 their second daughter, Victoria, was born in Belo Horizonte.

== Career ==
=== National team ===
On October 10, 2010 Brazil, including Vissotto, won a title of World Champion 2010. On August 12, 2012 Vissotto and his team mates lost in the final of Olympic Games with Russia (2-3) and achieved a silver medal, although Vissotto missed the final due to injury. On September 21, 2014 his national team lost with Poland in final of the World Championship 2014 (1-3) and Vissotto achieved his second medal of World Championship, this time it was silver.

== Sporting achievements ==
=== Clubs ===
==== CEV Champions League ====
- 2008/2009 - with Itas Diatec Trentino
- 2009/2010 - with Itas Diatec Trentino

==== FIVB Club World Championship ====
- Qatar 2009 - with Itas Diatec Trentino

==== AVC Asian Club Championship ====
- 2016 - with Al Arabi Qatar

==== National championships ====
- 2005/2006 Brazilian Championship, with Minas Tênis Clube
- 2008/2009 Italian Championship, with Itas Diatec Trentino
- 2009/2010 Italian Cup, with Itas Diatec Trentino
- 2009/2010 Italian Championship, with Itas Diatec Trentino
- 2010/2011 Brazilian Championship, with Vôlei Futuro
- 2012/2013 Russian Championship, with Ural Ufa
- 2014/2015 Japanese Championship, with JT Thunders
- 2018/2019 Brazilian Superliga, with Funvic Taubaté

=== National team ===
- 2000 CSV U19 South American Championship
- 2000 FIVB U19 World Championship
- 2001 FIVB U21 World Championship
- 2009 FIVB World League
- 2009 South American Championship
- 2009 FIVB World Grand Champions Cup
- 2010 FIVB World League
- 2010 FIVB World Championship
- 2011 FIVB World League
- 2011 FIVB World Cup
- 2012 Olympic Games
- 2013 FIVB World League
- 2013 South American Championship
- 2014 FIVB World League
- 2014 FIVB World Championship

=== Individually ===
- 2008 Serie A1 - Best Scorer
- 2010 Coppa Italia - Final Four Most Valuable Player
- 2016 Asian Club Championship - Best Middle Blocker
