= 2010 Men's South American Volleyball Club Championship =

Tournament details
- Host country: Argentina
- Dates: October 26 – 31
- Teams: 6
- Venues: 2 (in Bolivar and San Juan host cities)

Final positions
- Champions: (Argentina) Drean Bolivar (1st title)

Tournament awards
- MVP: (Argentina) Luciano de Cecco (BLV)

The 2010 Men's South American Volleyball Club Championship was the second official edition of the men's volleyball tournament, played by six teams between October 26 and November 1, 2010, at the República de Venezuela Complex in Bolivar and the Aldo Cantoni Colliseum in San Juan, Argentina. The winning team qualified for the 2010 FIVB Men's Club World Championship.

The competition was originally scheduled from October 26 to 30 but due to the national mourning due to the death of Argentinean ex-president Néstor Kirchner, had to be rescheduled.

== Competing clubs ==
Pool A	Pool B
(Argentina) Drean Bolivar (Paraguay) Deportivo Colón (Uruguay) Nacional de Montevideo	(Brazil) Cimed Florianópolis (Argentina) UPCN San Juan (Chile) Club Linares (Peru) ~~Deportivo Wanka~~ (withdrew)

== First round ==
=== Pool A ===
Pos	Team	Pld	W	L	Pts	SW	SL	SR	SPW	SPL	SPR	Qualification
1	(Argentina) Drean Bolivar	2	2	0	4	6	0	MAX	150	101	1.485	Semifinals
2	(Paraguay) Deportivo Colón	2	1	1	3	3	3	1.000	130	131	0.992	Semifinals
3	(Uruguay) Nacional de Montevideo	2	0	2	2	0	6	0.000	102	150	0.680	

Date		Score		Set 1	Set 2	Set 3	Set 4	Set 5	Total
Oct 26	Drean Bolivar (Argentina)	3–0	(Paraguay) Deportivo Colón	25–21	25–18	25–16			75–55
Oct 28	Deportivo Colón (Paraguay)	3–0	(Uruguay) Nacional de Montevideo	25–22	25–15	25–19			75–56
Oct 28	Nacional de Montevideo (Uruguay)	0–3	(Argentina) Drean Bolivar	14–25	16–25	16–25			46–75

=== Pool B ===
Pos	Team	Pld	W	L	Pts	SW	SL	SR	SPW	SPL	SPR	Qualification
1	(Brazil) Cimed Florianópolis	2	2	0	4	6	1	6.000	174	132	1.318	Semifinals
2	(Argentina) UPCN San Juan	2	1	1	3	4	3	1.333	160	146	1.096	Semifinals
3	(Chile) Club Linares	2	0	2	2	0	6	0.000	97	150	0.647	

Date		Score		Set 1	Set 2	Set 3	Set 4	Set 5	Total
Oct 26	UPCN San Juan (Argentina)	3–0	(Chile) Club Linares	25–16	25–19	25–12			75–47
Oct 28	Club Linares (Chile)	0–3	(Brazil) Cimed Florianópolis	10–25	21–25	19–25			50–75
Oct 28	Cimed Florianópolis (Brazil)	3–1	(Argentina) UPCN San Juan	25–21	25–21	24–26	25–17		99–85

== Championship round ==
Semifinals
Bolivar 10-30-2010
(Argentina) Drean Bolivar	3
(Argentina) UPCN San Juan	0
Bolivar 10-30-2010
(Brazil) Cimed Florianópolis	3
(Paraguay) Deportivo Colón	0

Final
Bolivar 10-31-2010
(Argentina) Drean Bolivar	3
(Brazil) Cimed Florianópolis	2
Third place
Bolivar 10-31-2010
(Argentina) UPCN San Juan	3
(Paraguay) Deportivo Colón	0

=== Semifinals ===
Date		Score		Set 1	Set 2	Set 3	Set 4	Set 5	Total
Oct 30	Cimed Florianópolis (Brazil)	3–0	(Paraguay) Deportivo Colón	25–14	25–14	25–15			75–43
Oct 30	Drean Bolivar (Argentina)	3–0	(Argentina) UPCN San Juan	25–22	25–20	25–15			75–57

=== Bronze medal match ===
Date		Score		Set 1	Set 2	Set 3	Set 4	Set 5	Total
Oct 31	UPCN San Juan (Argentina)	3–1	(Paraguay) Deportivo Colón	25–16	25–17	21–25	25–16		96–74

=== Gold medal match ===
Date		Score		Set 1	Set 2	Set 3	Set 4	Set 5	Total
Oct 30	Drean Bolivar (Argentina)	3–2	(Brazil) Cimed Florianópolis	23–25	25–19	26–24	19–25	16–14	109–107

== Final standing ==
Rank	Team
1st place, gold medalist(s)	(Argentina) Drean Bolivar
2nd place, silver medalist(s)	(Brazil) Cimed Florianópolis
3rd place, bronze medalist(s)	(Argentina) UPCN San Juan
4	(Paraguay) Deportivo Colón
5	(Chile) Club Linares
5	(Uruguay) Nacional de Montevideo

Qualified for the 2010 FIVB Men's Club World Championship

2010 Men's South American Volleyball Club Champions

1st title

Team Roster:
Sebastián Solé, Gabriel Arroyo(C), Federico Pereyra, Iván Castellani, Lucas Ocampo, Pablo Meana(L), Jean Carlo Badalotti, Javier Filardi, Franco Giachetta, Nicolás Méndez, Edgardo Lioca, Luciano De Cecco,

Head Coach: Martín Weber

== Individual awards ==
- Most valuable player
  - (Argentina) Luciano de Cecco (Drean Bolivar)
- Best spiker
  - (Argentina) Lucas Ocampo (Drean Bolivar)
- Best blocker
  - (Brazil) Eder Carbonera (Cimed Florianópolis)
- Best server
  - (Argentina) Lucas Ocampo (Drean Bolivar)
- Best digger
  - (Brazil) Jean Carlo Badalotti (Drean Bolivar)
- Best setter
  - (Argentina) Luciano de Cecco (Drean Bolivar)
- Best receiver
  - (Brazil) Thales Hoss (Cimed Florianópolis)
- Best libero
  - (Brazil) Thales Hoss (Cimed Florianópolis)
