= Grêmio Recreativo e Esportivo Reunidas =

Grêmio Recreativo e Esportivo Reunida may refer to:

- Grêmio Recreativo e Esportivo Reunidas (men's volleyball)
- Grêmio Recreativo e Esportivo Reunidas (women's volleyball)
