= Michael dos Santos =

Brazilian volleyball player (born 1983)

Michael Dos Santos (born 30 April 1983 in Birigui) is a Brazilian volleyball player who currently plays for Vôlei Futuro men's team. He became the first player in professional volleyball history to come out as gay.

== Coming out ==
On 1 April 2011, in the Gymnasium of the Stream, in Contagem, Minas Gerais, in the first game of the Superliga male semifinals between Sada Cruzeiro Vôlei and Vôlei Futuro, won by the team mining by 3 sets to 2, the player Michael was subjected to taunts of "Bicha! Bicha!" ("faggot") from supporters of Sada Cruzeiro, because of rumors concerning his sexual orientation. Four days after the game, dos Santos publicly acknowledged that he is gay, sparking an internal discussion within the volleyball sport culture. On April 9, 2011, in the second game of the Premiership in the Placido Rocha gym in Araçatuba, Sao Paulo State, in which Vôlei won for 3 sevens and 2, the team issued a series of actions against the homophobia suffered by Michael. A giant banner calling for an end to prejudice was opened in the bleachers, while all fans received pink bats at the entrance of the Placido Rocha. The libero Mário Júnior, in turn, played with a colored shirt.

Furthermore, the team called for Sada Cruzeiro to be sanctioned by the Brazilian Confederation of Volleyball due to the homophobic taunts from the bleachers, and the Confederation board fined Sada US$32,000 on April 13. The fine is being appealed.

== Stats ==
Dos Santos plays as middle blocker and is 202 cm tall.
