= Brazilian Volleyball Super League =

Brazilian Volleyball Super League may refer to:

- Brazilian Volleyball Super League (men)
- Brazilian Volleyball Super League (women)
