= Otávio Pinto =

Brazilian volleyball player (born 1991)

Personal information
- Full name: Otávio Henrique Rodrigues Pinto
- Born: 27 February 1991 (age 35); Minas Gerais, Brazil
- Height: 2.02 m (6 ft 8 in)
- Weight: 85 kg (187 lb)
- Spike: 347 cm (137 in)
- Block: 319 cm (126 in)

Volleyball information
- Position: Middle Blocker
- Current club: Sada Cruzeiro
- Number: 4

Career
Years	Teams
2005–2015	Minas Tênis Clube
2015–2019	Funvic Taubaté
2019–	Sada Cruzeiro

National team
2015–	Brazil
Honours
Men's volleyball
Representing Brazil
World Grand Champions Cup
Gold medal – first place	2017 Japan	Team
World League
Silver medal – second place	2017 Curitiba	Team
Pan American Games
Gold medal – first place	2023 Santiago
Silver medal – second place	2015 Toronto	Team
South American Championship
Gold medal – first place	2017 Santiago/Temuco
Silver medal – second place	2023 Recife
- Last updated: 17 September 2017

Otávio Pinto (born 27 February 1991) is a Brazilian indoor volleyball player. He is a current member of the Brazil men's national volleyball team.

== Sporting achievements ==
=== Clubs ===
- 2008/2009 Brazilian Superliga, with Minas Tênis Clube
- 2016/2017 Brazilian Superliga, with Funvic Taubaté
- 2018/2019 Brazilian Superliga, with Funvic Taubaté

=== South American Club Championship ===
- 2013 – with Minas Tênis Clube
- 2014 – with Minas Tênis Clube
- 2016 – with Funvic Taubaté
- 2020 – with Sada Cruzeiro

=== FIVB Club World Championship ===
- 2019 – with Sada Cruzeiro
- 2021 – with Sada Cruzeiro
- 2022 – with Sada Cruzeiro
- 2024 – with Sada Cruzeiro

=== National team ===
- 2013 FIVB U23 World Championship
- 2015 Pan American Games
- 2017 FIVB World League
- 2017 South American Championship
- 2017 FIVB World Grand Champions Cup

=== Individuals ===
- 2010 U21 South American Championship – "Best Blocker"
- 2020 South American Club Championship – Best Middle Blocker
