= 2009 FIVB Volleyball Men's Club World Championship =

2009 Men's Club World Championship

Tournament details
- Host country: Qatar
- Dates: 3–8 November
- Teams: 8 (from 5 confederations)
- Venue: 1 (in 1 host city)

Final positions
- Champions: (Italy) Trentino BetClic (1st title)

Tournament awards
- MVP: (Bulgaria) Matey Kaziyski (TRE)

The 2009 FIVB Volleyball Men's Club World Championship was the 5th edition of the event. It was held in Doha, Qatar from 3 to 8 November 2009.

== Golden formula ==
For the first time in an FIVB tournament, a new rule trialled during the FIVB Volleyball Men's Club World Championship Doha 2009 in order to “keep the ball flying” and add value to a rally for the spectator. The Golden Formula playing system requires that the first attack for each team begins from the back row in an attempt to produce longer rallies.

== Qualification ==
Team (Confederation)	Qualified as
(Qatar) Al-Arabi (AVC)	Hosts
(Egypt) Zamalek (CAVB)	2009 African Champions
(Iran) Paykan Tehran (AVC)	2009 Asian Champions
(Italy) Trentino BetClic (CEV)	2009 European Champions
(Puerto Rico) Plataneros de Corozal (NORCECA)	2009 NORCECA Representatives
(Brazil) Cimed Florianópolis (CSV)	2009 South American Champions
(Russia) Zenit Kazan (CEV)	Wild Card (1st team in the CEV Ranking)
(Poland) PGE Skra Bełchatów (CEV)	Wild Card (2nd team in the CEV Ranking)

== Pools composition ==
Pool A	Pool B
(Italy) Trentino BetClic	(Poland) PGE Skra Bełchatów
(Russia) Zenit Kazan	(Iran) Paykan Tehran
(Puerto Rico) Plataneros de Corozal	(Brazil) Cimed Florianópolis
(Egypt) Zamalek	(Qatar) Al-Arabi

== Venue ==
All matches
Doha, Qatar
Aspire Ladies Sports Hall
Capacity: 2,500

== Preliminary round ==
- All times are Arabia Standard Time (UTC+03:00).

=== Pool A ===
Pos	Team	Pld	W	L	Pts	SW	SL	SR	SPW	SPL	SPR	Qualification
1	(Italy) Trentino BetClic	3	3	0	6	9	3	3.000	286	239	1.197	Semifinals
2	(Russia) Zenit Kazan	3	2	1	5	8	3	2.667	255	206	1.238	Semifinals
3	(Egypt) Zamalek	3	1	2	4	4	8	0.500	243	269	0.903	
4	(Puerto Rico) Plataneros de Corozal	3	0	3	3	2	9	0.222	197	267	0.738	

Date	Time		Score		Set 1	Set 2	Set 3	Set 4	Set 5	Total	Report
03 Nov	11:00	Trentino BetClic (Italy)	3–1	(Egypt) Zamalek	25–18	25–21	23–25	25–20		98–84	P2 P3
03 Nov	16:00	Zenit Kazan (Russia)	3–0	(Puerto Rico) Plataneros de Corozal	25–20	25–14	25–17			75–51	P2 P3
04 Nov	11:00	Zamalek (Egypt)	3–2	(Puerto Rico) Plataneros de Corozal	23–25	25–13	23–25	25–14	21–19	117–96	P2 P3
04 Nov	16:00	Trentino BetClic (Italy)	3–2	(Russia) Zenit Kazan	24–26	25–23	24–26	25–19	15–11	113–105	P2 P3
05 Nov	11:00	Zenit Kazan (Russia)	3–0	(Egypt) Zamalek	25–18	25–13	25–11			75–42	P2 P3
05 Nov	16:00	Plataneros de Corozal (Puerto Rico)	0–3	(Italy) Trentino BetClic	18–25	13–25	19–25			50–75	P2 P3

=== Pool B ===
Pos	Team	Pld	W	L	Pts	SW	SL	SR	SPW	SPL	SPR	Qualification
1	(Poland) PGE Skra Bełchatów	3	3	0	6	9	1	9.000	247	197	1.254	Semifinals
2	(Iran) Paykan Tehran	3	2	1	5	6	4	1.500	225	225	1.000	Semifinals
3	(Brazil) Cimed Florianópolis	3	1	2	4	5	7	0.714	274	271	1.011	
4	(Qatar) Al-Arabi	3	0	3	3	1	9	0.111	190	243	0.782	

Date	Time		Score		Set 1	Set 2	Set 3	Set 4	Set 5	Total	Report
03 Nov	18:00	PGE Skra Bełchatów (Poland)	3–0	(Qatar) Al-Arabi	25–22	25–11	25–20			75–53	P2 P3
03 Nov	20:00	Paykan Tehran (Iran)	3–1	(Brazil) Cimed Florianópolis	15–25	28–26	25–21	25–22		93–94	P2 P3
04 Nov	18:40	Al-Arabi (Qatar)	1–3	(Brazil) Cimed Florianópolis	25–18	17–25	17–25	22–25		81–93	P2 P3
04 Nov	20:55	PGE Skra Bełchatów (Poland)	3–0	(Iran) Paykan Tehran	25–22	25–18	25–17			75–57	P2 P3
05 Nov	18:00	Paykan Tehran (Iran)	3–0	(Qatar) Al-Arabi	25–23	25–19	25–14			75–56	P2 P3
05 Nov	20:00	Cimed Florianópolis (Brazil)	1–3	(Poland) PGE Skra Bełchatów	25–22	18–25	21–25	23–25		87–97	P2 P3

== Final round ==
- All times are Arabia Standard Time (UTC+03:00).

Semifinals
7 November
(Poland) Bełchatów	3
(Russia) Kazan	1
7 November
(Italy) Trentino	3
(Iran) Paykan	0

Final
8 November
(Poland) Bełchatów	0
(Italy) Trentino	3
3rd place match
8 November
(Russia) Kazan	3
(Iran) Paykan	0

=== Semifinals ===
Date	Time		Score		Set 1	Set 2	Set 3	Set 4	Set 5	Total	Report
07 Nov	18:00	PGE Skra Bełchatów (Poland)	3–1	(Russia) Zenit Kazan	15–25	25–23	25–21	26–24		91–93	P2 P3
07 Nov	20:20	Trentino BetClic (Italy)	3–0	(Iran) Paykan Tehran	25–18	25–22	25–19			75–59	P2 P3

=== 3rd place match ===
Date	Time		Score		Set 1	Set 2	Set 3	Set 4	Set 5	Total	Report
08 Nov	18:00	Zenit Kazan (Russia)	3–0	(Iran) Paykan Tehran	25–13	25–18	25–16			75–47	P2 P3

=== Final ===
Date	Time		Score		Set 1	Set 2	Set 3	Set 4	Set 5	Total	Report
08 Nov	20:00	PGE Skra Bełchatów (Poland)	0–3	(Italy) Trentino BetClic	24–26	18–25	19–25			61–76	P2 P3

== Final standing ==
Rank	Team
1st place, gold medalist(s)	(Italy) Trentino BetClic
2nd place, silver medalist(s)	(Poland) PGE Skra Bełchatów
3rd place, bronze medalist(s)	(Russia) Zenit Kazan
4	(Iran) Paykan Tehran
5	(Qatar) Al-Arabi
5	(Brazil) Cimed Florianópolis
5	(Puerto Rico) Plataneros de Corozal
5	(Egypt) Zamalek

2009 Men's Club World Champions

1st title

12–man Roster
Matey Kaziyski (c), Lorenzo Gallosti, Emanuele Birarelli, Osmany Juantorena, Łukasz Żygadło, Raphael Oliveira, Leandro Vissotto, Andrea Sala, Tsvetan Sokolov, Francesco Corsini, Renaud Herpe, Andrea Bari
Head coach
Radostin Stoychev

== Awards ==
- Most valuable player
  (Bulgaria) Matey Kaziyski (Trentino BetClic)
- Best scorer
  (Poland) Bartosz Kurek (PGE Skra Bełchatów)
- Best spiker
  (Bulgaria) Matey Kaziyski (Trentino BetClic)
- Best blocker
  (Poland) Marcin Możdżonek (PGE Skra Bełchatów)
- Best server
  (Cuba) Osmany Juantorena (Trentino BetClic)
- Best setter
  (Brazil) Raphael Oliveira (Trentino BetClic)
- Best libero
  (Russia) Aleksey Verbov (Zenit Kazan)
