= Luciano De Cecco =

Argentine volleyball player

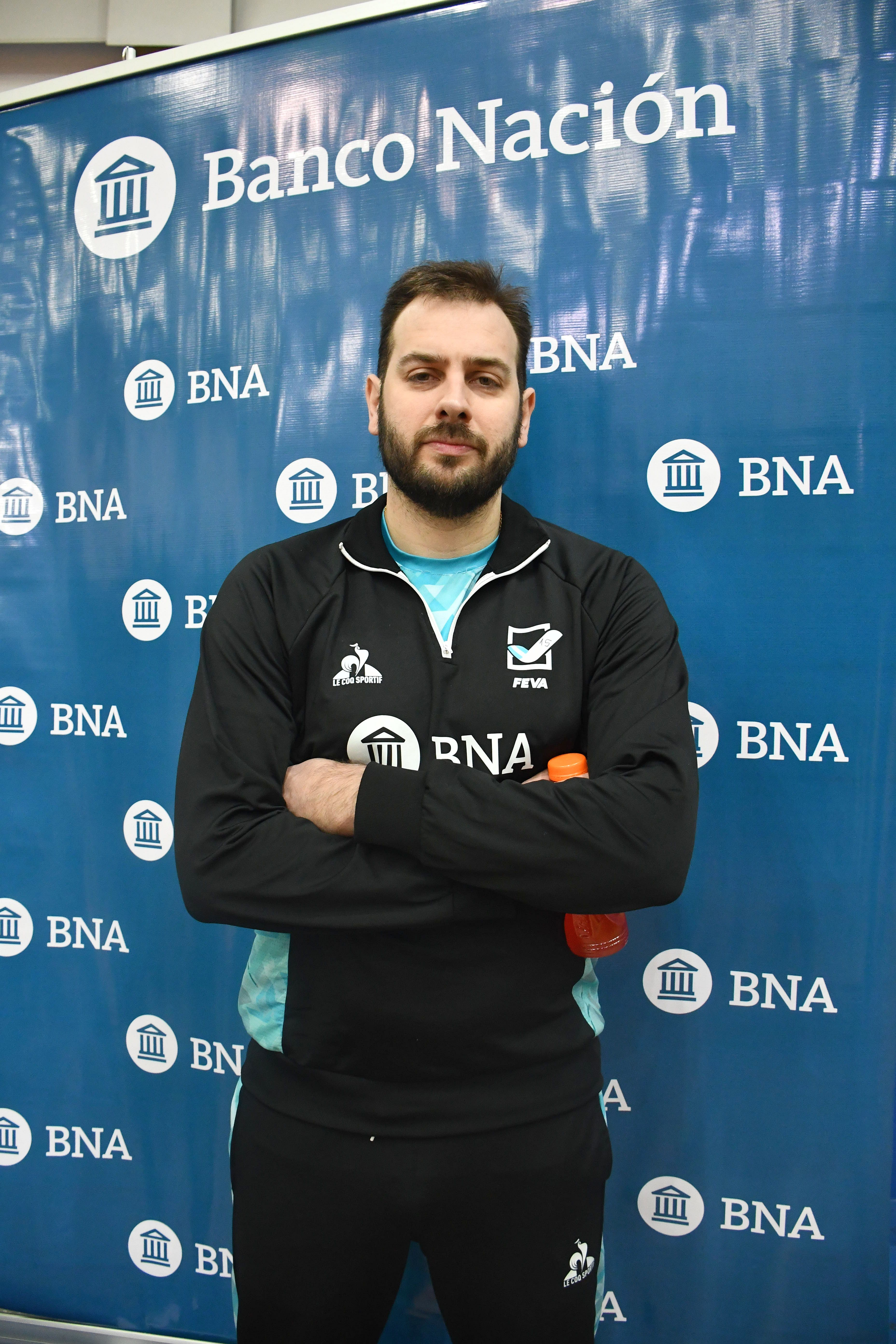
- De Cecco in 2024

Personal information
- Nickname: Cachete
- Born: 2 June 1988 (age 38) Santa Fe, Argentina
- Height: 1.91 m (6 ft 3 in)
- Weight: 88 kg (194 lb)
- Spike: 345 cm (136 in)
- Block: 330 cm (130 in)

Volleyball information
- Position: Setter
- Current club: Lokomotiv Novosibirsk

Career
- Years: Team
- 2005–2006 2006–2007 2007 2007–2008 2008–2009 2009–2010 2010–2011 2011–2012 2012–2014 2014–2020 2020–2024 2024–2025 2025–2026 2026–: Gimnasia y Esgrima Santa Fe; Bolívar Voley; Gabeca Pallavolo; Belgrano de Córdoba; Top Volley Latina; Dynamo Kaliningrad; Bolívar Voley; Gabeca Pallavolo; Volley Piacenza; Sir Safety Perugia; Volley Lube; Modena Volley; KS Norwid Częstochowa; Lokomotiv Novosibirsk

National team
- Years: Team
- 2006–: Argentina
Honours
Men's volleyball
Representing Argentina
Olympic Games
| Bronze medal – third place | 2020 Tokyo |
Pan American Games
| Gold medal – first place | 2015 Toronto |
Pan American Cup
| Gold medal – first place | 2017 Gatineau |
South American Championship
| Gold medal – first place | 2023 Recife |
| Silver medal – second place | 2007 Chile |
| Silver medal – second place | 2009 Colombia |
| Silver medal – second place | 2011 Brazil |
| Silver medal – second place | 2013 Brazil |

Luciano De Cecco (born 2 June 1988) is an Argentine professional volleyball player who plays as a setter for Lokomotiv Novosibirsk and the Argentina national team.He won the bronze medal at 2020 Summer Olympics.

== Career ==
=== Club ===
In May 2014, De Cecco signed a 3-year contract with Sir Safety Perugia. For the 2020–21 season, he moved to Cucine Lube Civitanova.

In May 2024 he joined Modena Volley.

In 2025 he moved to Poland and signed a one-year contract with Norwid Częstochowa for the 2025–26 PlusLiga season, his first club in that country.

In June 2026 it was announced that he would join Lokomotiv Novosibirsk in Russia for the 2026–27 season..

=== National team ===
Luciano was first appointed to the Argentine national team in 2006 before the World League, but he did not play in any match. He began his participation during the World Championship, where Argentina took 13th place. His national team won silvers medals at South American Championship in 2007, 2009, 2011, 2013 because four losses to Brazil in the finals. In 2009 and 2011, he was awarded Best Setter of the South American Championship. In 2011, he achieved the title of the Best Setter of the World League. On 4 December 2011, he was Best Setter of World Cup.

In 2015, De Cecco won the gold medal at the 2015 Pan American Games.

Luciano won the bronze medal at the 2020 Summer Olympics.

In 2023, Luciano won the gold medal at the South American Championship held in Recife, Brazil.

On 3 July 2024, the Argentine Olympic Committee appointed De Cecco and the field hockey player Rocío Sánchez Moccia as the flag bearers to 2024 Summer Olympics.

After the 2024 Olympics De Cecco stepped away from the national team. He returned for the 2025 World Championship in the Philippines, where Argentina lost to Italy 0–3 in the round of 16 and finished ninth.

== Honours ==
=== Club ===
- CEV Champions League
  - 2016–17 – with Sir Safety Perugia
- FIVB Club World Championship
  - Betim 2021 – with Cucine Lube Civitanova
- CSV South American Club Championship
  - Argentina 2010 – with Bolívar Voley
- CEV Challenge Cup
  - 2012–13 – with Copra Elior Piacenza
- Domestic
  - 2006–07 Argentine Cup, with Bolívar Voley
  - 2006–07 Argentine Championship, with Bolívar Voley
  - 2013–14 Italian Cup, with Copra Elior Piacenza
  - 2017–18 Italian SuperCup, with Sir Safety Perugia
  - 2017–18 Italian Cup, with Sir Safety Perugia
  - 2017–18 Italian Championship, with Sir Safety Perugia
  - 2018–19 Italian Cup, with Sir Safety Perugia
  - 2019–20 Italian SuperCup, with Sir Safety Perugia
  - 2020–21 Italian Cup, with Cucine Lube Civitanova
  - 2020–21 Italian Championship, with Cucine Lube Civitanova
  - 2021–22 Italian Championship, with Cucine Lube Civitanova

=== Individual awards ===
- 2009: CSV South American Championship – Best setter
- 2010: CSV South American Club Championship – Best setter
- 2010: CSV South American Club Championship – Most valuable player
- 2010: FIVB Club World Championship – Best server
- 2011: CSV South American Championship – Best setter
- 2011: FIVB World League – Best setter
- 2011: FIVB World Cup – Best setter
- 2013: CEV Challenge Cup – Most valuable player
- 2015: Pan American Games – Best setter
- 2017: CEV Champions League – Best setter
- 2021: Olympic Games – Best setter
- 2023: CSV South American Championship – Best setter

Awards
| Preceded by (Argentina) Santiago Orduna | Best Setter of CSV South American Championship; 2009; 2011 | Succeeded by (Brazil) Bruno Rezende |
| Preceded by (Brazil) Bruno Rezende | Most Valuable Player of CSV South American Club Championship; 2010 | Succeeded by (Brazil) Murilo Endres |
| Preceded by (Cuba) Osmany Juantorena | Best Server of FIVB Club World Championship; 2010 | Succeeded by (Bulgaria) Matey Kaziyski |
| Preceded by (Russia) Sergey Grankin | Best Setter of FIVB World League; 2011 | Succeeded by (Bulgaria) Georgi Bratoev |
| Preceded by (Spain) Miguel Ángel Falasca | Best Setter of FIVB World Cup; 2011 | Succeeded by (United States) Micah Christenson |
| Preceded by (Brazil) Bruno Rezende | Best Setter of Pan American Games; 2015 | Succeeded by (Argentina) Matías Sánchez |
| Preceded by (Italy) Simone Giannelli | Best Setter of CEV Champions League; 2016/2017 | Succeeded by (Russia) Aleksandr Butko |
| Preceded by (Brazil) Bruno Rezende | Best Setter of Olympic Games; 2020 | Succeeded by TBD |

Olympic Games
| Preceded by Francesca Baruzzi; Franco Dal Farra | Flagbearer for Argentina; París 2024; With: Rocío Sánchez Moccia | Succeeded by Incumbent |
