= 2015 Men's South American Volleyball Championship =

2015 Men's South American Championship
Tournament details
- Host country: Brazil
- Dates: 30 September – 4 October
- Teams: 8
- Venue: 1 (in 1 host city)

Final positions
- Champions: Brazil (30th title)

Tournament awards
- MVP: (Brazil) Sérgio Santos

The 2015 Men's South American Volleyball Championship was the 31st edition of the Men's South American Volleyball Championship, organised by South America's governing volleyball body, the Confederación Sudamericana de Voleibol (CSV). The tournament was played in Maceió, Brazil. Brazil won its 30th title with Sérgio Santos being elected Most Valuable Player.

== Pools composition ==
Pool A	Pool B
Brazil (Hosts)	Argentina
Chile	Colombia
Peru	Guyana
Venezuela	Uruguay

== Preliminary round ==
- All times are Brasília Time (UTC−03:00).

=== Pool A ===
Pos	Team	Pld	W	L	Pts	SW	SL	SR	SPW	SPL	SPR	Qualification
1	Brazil	3	3	0	9	9	1	9.000	248	150	1.653	Semifinals
2	Venezuela	3	2	1	6	6	5	1.200	226	237	0.954	Semifinals
3	Chile	3	1	2	3	5	6	0.833	238	250	0.952	5th place match
4	Peru	3	0	3	0	1	9	0.111	171	246	0.695	7th place match

Date	Time		Score		Set 1	Set 2	Set 3	Set 4	Set 5	Total	Report
30 Sep	16:00	Chile	1–3	Venezuela	25–17	17–25	21–25	20–25		83–92	Report
30 Sep	18:45	Brazil	3–0	Peru	25–8	25–9	25–15			75–32	Report
1 Oct	12:30	Venezuela	3–1	Peru	20–25	25–19	26–24	25–11		96–79	Report
1 Oct	18:00	Chile	1–3	Brazil	25–23	18–25	14–25	23–25		80–98	Report
2 Oct	12:45	Peru	0–3	Chile	23–25	16–25	21–25			60–75	Report
2 Oct	18:15	Brazil	3–0	Venezuela	25–16	25–8	25–14			75–38	Report

=== Pool B ===
Pos	Team	Pld	W	L	Pts	SW	SL	SR	SPW	SPL	SPR	Qualification
1	Argentina	3	3	0	9	9	1	9.000	248	162	1.531	Semifinals
2	Colombia	3	2	1	6	7	3	2.333	237	209	1.134	Semifinals
3	Uruguay	3	1	2	3	3	6	0.500	173	201	0.861	5th place match
4	Guyana	3	0	3	0	0	9	0.000	139	225	0.618	7th place match

Date	Time		Score		Set 1	Set 2	Set 3	Set 4	Set 5	Total	Report
30 Sep	13:15	Colombia	3–0	Uruguay	25–18	25–18	25–18			75–54	Report
30 Sep	21:00	Argentina	3–0	Guyana	25–9	25–9	25–13			75–31	Report
1 Oct	15:15	Colombia	3–0	Guyana	25–22	25–15	25–20			75–57	Report
1 Oct	21:00	Uruguay	0–3	Argentina	12–25	16–25	16–25			44–75	Report
2 Oct	15:30	Guyana	0–3	Uruguay	14–25	14–25	23–25			51–75	Report
2 Oct	21:00	Argentina	3–1	Colombia	25–17	28–26	20–25	25–19		98–87	Report

== Final round ==
- All times are Brasília Time (UTC−03:00).

=== 7th–8th places ===
==== 7th place match ====
Date	Time		Score		Set 1	Set 2	Set 3	Set 4	Set 5	Total	Report
3 Oct	18:20	Guyana	0–3	Peru	19–25	14–25	17–25			50–75	Report

=== 5th–6th places ===
==== 5th place match ====
Date	Time		Score		Set 1	Set 2	Set 3	Set 4	Set 5	Total	Report
3 Oct	21:00	Chile	3–1	Uruguay	25–19	23–25	25–16	25–18		98–78	Report

=== Final four ===
Semifinals
3 October
Argentina	3
Venezuela	1
3 October
Brazil	3
Colombia	0

Final
4 October
Argentina	0
Brazil	3
3rd place match
4 October
Venezuela	0
Colombia	3

==== Semifinals ====
Date	Time		Score		Set 1	Set 2	Set 3	Set 4	Set 5	Total	Report
3 Oct	13:00	Argentina	3–1	Venezuela	25–18	20–25	25–16	25–17		95–76	Report
3 Oct	15:40	Brazil	3–0	Colombia	25–19	25–14	25–10			75–43	Report

==== 3rd place match ====
Date	Time		Score		Set 1	Set 2	Set 3	Set 4	Set 5	Total	Report
4 Oct	08:30	Venezuela	0–3	Colombia	21–25	25–27	21–25			67–77	Report

==== Final ====
Date	Time		Score		Set 1	Set 2	Set 3	Set 4	Set 5	Total	Report
4 Oct	10:15	Argentina	0–3	Brazil	16–25	19–25	16–25			51–75	Report

== Final standing ==
Rank	Team
1st place, gold medalist(s)	Brazil
2nd place, silver medalist(s)	Argentina
3rd place, bronze medalist(s)	Colombia
4	Venezuela
5	Chile
6	Uruguay
7	Peru
8	Guyana

2015 Men's South American champions

Brazil
30th title

12–man roster
Bruno (c), Isac, T. Brendle, Kadu, Raphael, Sérgio, M. Souza, Lucas Lóh, Lucas, Evandro, Lucarelli, Renan
Head coach
Bernardinho

== Awards ==
- Most valuable player
  (Brazil) Sérgio Santos
- Best setter
  (Brazil) Bruno Rezende
- Best outside spikers
  (Argentina) Rodrigo Quiroga
  (Colombia) Ronald Jiménez
- Best middle blockers
  (Argentina) Facundo Imhoff
  (Brazil) Isac Santos
- Best opposite spiker
  (Brazil) Evandro Guerra
- Best libero
  (Argentina) Facundo Santucci
