= Grêmio Recreativo e Esportivo Reunidas (women's volleyball) =

Vôlei Futuro
- Full name: Grêmio Recreativo e Esportivo Reunidas
- Short name: Vôlei Futuro
- Ground: Ginásio Municipal Dr. Plácido Rocha; Araçatuba, São Paulo (Capacity: 2,500)
- League: Brazilian Superliga
- 2011–12: 3rd

The Grêmio Recreativo e Esportivo Reunidas, also known as Vôlei Futuro, were a Brazilian women's volleyball team based in Araçatuba, São Paulo. Created from the men's team, women's section folded in July 2012, a few months after finishing third in the 2011–12 Brazilian Superliga.

== 2011–2012 team ==
As of June 2011

#	Name		Height	Position
1	Walewska Moreira de Oliveira	Walewska	1.90	Middle Blocker
2	Andressa Herminia Gelenski Picussa	Andressa	1.94	Middle Blocker
3	Fernanda Gritzbach	Fê Gritz	1.94	Middle Blocker
4	Paula Renata Marques Pequeno	Paula Pequeno	1.83	Outside Hitter
5	Stacy Denise Sykora	Stacy	1.75	Libero
6	Ana Cristina Villela Porto	Ana Cristina	1.73	Setter
7	Ananda Cristina Marinho	Ananda	1.77	Setter
8	Fernanda Berti Alves	Fê Berti	1.92	Right Side Hitter
9	Veridiana Mostaço de Oliveira	Verê	1.80	Libero
10	Juliana Odilon da Silva	Ju Odilon	1.80	Outside Hitter
11	Joyce Gomes da Silva	Joycinha	1.90	Right Side Hitter
12	Caroline de Oliveira Saad Gattaz	Carol Gattaz	1.92	Middle Blocker
13	Viviane Aparecida Dias	Vivi	1.75	Outside Hitter
15	Ana Tiemi Takagui	Ana Tiemi	1.88	Setter
16	Fernanda Garay Rodrigues	Fê Garay	1.81	Outside Hitter
17	Clarisse Benicio Peixoto	Clarisse	1.80	Outside Hitter
20	Maria de Lourdes Ribeiro Silva	Malu	1.97	Middle Blocker

- Coach: (Brazil) Paulo Rego Barros Junior (Paulo Coco)
- 1st Assistant coach: (Brazil) Jorge Edson Souza de Brito
- 2nd Assistant coach: (Brazil) Glaison Luis Raimundo

== Honors ==
- Champion - Jogos Abertos do Interior - Santos 2010
- 2nd place - Campeonato Paulista 2010
- 2nd place - Torneio Internacional da Basileia (Suiça) 2010
- 3rd place - Brazilian Superliga 2010/2011
- 2nd place - Jogos Abertos do Interior - Mogi das Cruzes 2011
- Champion - Campeonato Paulista 2011
