= Colinas, Rio Grande do Sul =

Municipality of Rio Grande do Sul, Brazil

Colinas
- Municipality
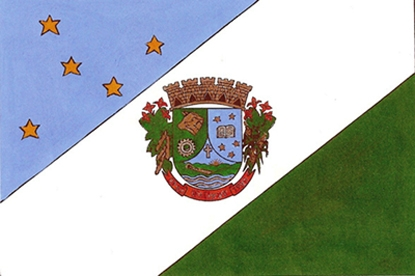
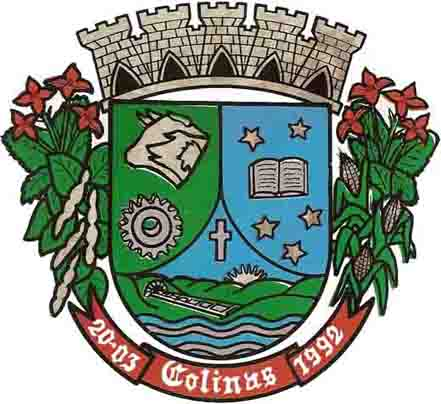
- Flag Coat of arms

- Location within Rio Grande do Sul

- Location in Brazil
- Coordinates: 29°23′16″S 51°52′12″W
- Country: Brazil
- State: Rio Grande do Sul

Government
  - Mayor: Sandro Ranieri Herrmann (2021-Present)

Population (2022)
  - Total: 2,423
- Time zone: UTC−3 (BRT)
- Postal code: 95895-000
- Area/distance code: 51
- Website: colinasrs.com.br

Colinas is a municipality in the state of Rio Grande do Sul, Brazil.

== See also ==
- List of municipalities in Rio Grande do Sul
