= Juiz de Fora Vôlei =

Brazilian men's volleyball team

JF Vôlei
- Full name: Universidade Federal de Juiz de Fora
- Short name: Juiz de Fora
- Ground: Universidade Federal de Juiz de Fora, Juiz de Fora (Capacity: 1,000)
- Chairman: (Brazil) Antônio Walter Sena Júnior
- Manager: (Brazil) Henrique Furtado
- League: Brazilian Superleague - Serie B (second tier)
- 2020-21: 1st (promoted)
- Website: Club home page

Uniforms
Home	Away

Juiz de Fora Vôlei (shortly, JF Vôlei) is a Brazilian men's volleyball team from Juiz de Fora, Minas Gerais. It started as a sports project at the Federal University of Juiz de Fora. It currently plays Brazilian Volleyball Superleague.

== Current squad ==
Squad as of November 3, 2016

Number	Player	Position	Height (m)
1	(Brazil) Rodrigo Rodrigues	Setter	1.90
2	(Brazil) Henrique Adami	Setter	1.92
3	(Brazil) Franco Dragon	Middle blocker	2.01
4	(Brazil) Bruno Gonçalves	Middle blocker	1.98
5	(Brazil) Carlos Costa	Opposite	2.03
6	(Brazil) Raphael Marcarini	Outside hitter	2.03
7	(Brazil) Ricardo Rego Junior	Outside hitter	2.06
8	(Brazil) Fábio Paes	Libero	1.90
9	(Brazil) Vitor Adriano	Outside hitter	1.93
10	(Argentina) Juan Manuel Méndez	Libero	1.83
14	(Brazil) Renan Buiatti	Opposite	2.17
16	(Brazil) Diego de Almeida	Middle blocker	2.05
17	(Brazil) Matheus Pereira	Middle blocker	2.05
18	(Brazil) Felipi Rammé	Outside hitter	1.97
19	(Colombia) Juan Pablo Moreno	Opposite	2.00
20	(Brazil) Rômulo Silva	Middle blocker	2.00

- Head coach: (Brazil) Henrique Furtado
- Assistant coach: (Brazil) André Silva
