= 2009 Men's South American Volleyball Club Championship =

Tournament details
- Host country: Brazil
- Dates: 7–11 November
- Teams: 8
- Venue: 1 (in Florianópolis host cities)

Final positions
- Champions: (Brazil) Cimed Florianópolis (1st title)

Tournament awards
- MVP: (Brazil) Bruno Rezende (CIM)

The 2009 Men's South American Volleyball Club Championship was the first official edition of the men's volleyball tournament, played by eight teams over 7–11 November 2009 in Florianópolis, Brazil. The winning team qualified for the 2009 FIVB Men's Club World Championship.

== Competing clubs ==
Pool A	Pool B
(Brazil) Cimed Florianópolis (Brazil) Brasil Vôlei Clube (Colombia) COC (Uruguay) Nacional de Montevideo	(Brazil) Vivo Minas (Brazil) Sada Cruzeiro (Argentina) Unión Formosa (Peru) Deportivo Wanka

== First round ==
=== Pool A ===
Pos	Team	Pld	W	L	Pts	SW	SL	SR	SPW	SPL	SPR	Qualification
1	(Brazil) Cimed Florianópolis	3	3	0	6	9	0	MAX	225	129	1.744	Semifinals
2	(Brazil) Brasil Vôlei Clube	3	2	1	5	6	3	2.000	209	163	1.282	Semifinals
3	(Colombia) COC	3	1	2	4	3	6	0.500	155	209	0.742	
4	(Uruguay) Nacional de Montevideo	3	0	3	3	0	9	0.000	137	225	0.609	

Date		Score		Set 1	Set 2	Set 3	Set 4	Set 5	Total
Nov 7	Brasil Vôlei Clube (Brazil)	3–0	(Colombia) COC	25–14	25–18	25–12			75–44
Nov 7	Cimed Florianópolis (Brazil)	3–0	(Uruguay) Nacional de Montevideo	25–9	25–11	25–14			75–34
Nov 8	Nacional de Montevideo (Uruguay)	0–3	(Brazil) Brasil Vôlei Clube	15–25	16–25	13–25			44–75
Nov 8	COC (Colombia)	0–3	(Brazil) Cimed Florianópolis	13–25	11–25	12–25			36–75
Nov 9	Nacional de Montevideo (Uruguay)	0–3	(Colombia) COC	16–25	20–25	23–25			59–75
Nov 9	Cimed Florianópolis (Brazil)	3–0	(Brazil) Brasil Vôlei Clube	25–21	25–19	25–19			75–59

=== Pool B ===
Pos	Team	Pld	W	L	Pts	SW	SL	SR	SPW	SPL	SPR	Qualification
1	(Brazil) Vivo Minas	3	3	0	6	9	2	4.500	263	202	1.302	Semifinals
2	(Brazil) Sada Cruzeiro	3	2	1	5	6	5	1.200	245	220	1.114	Semifinals
3	(Argentina) Unión Formosa	3	1	2	4	7	6	1.167	278	171	1.626	
4	(Peru) Deportivo Wanka	3	0	3	3	0	9	0.000	132	225	0.587	

Date		Score		Set 1	Set 2	Set 3	Set 4	Set 5	Total
Nov 7	Sada Cruzeiro (Brazil)	3–2	(Argentina) Unión Formosa	23–25	25–14	27–25	20–25	15–11	110–100
Nov 7	Vivo Minas (Brazil)	3–0	(Peru) Deportivo Wanka	25–10	25–16	25–13			75–39
Nov 8	Deportivo Wanka (Peru)	0–3	(Brazil) Sada Cruzeiro	13–25	15–25	17–25			45–75
Nov 8	Unión Formosa (Argentina)	2–3	(Brazil) Vivo Minas	25–15	22–25	24–26	25–22	17–15	113–103
Nov 9	Deportivo Wanka (Peru)	0–3	(Argentina) Unión Formosa	19–25	15–25	14–25			48–75
Nov 9	Vivo Minas (Brazil)	3–0	(Brazil) Sada Cruzeiro	25–21	25–17	25–22			75–60

== Championship Round ==
Semifinals
Florianópolis 10-10-2010
(Brazil) Cimed Florianópolis	3
(Brazil) Sada Cruzeiro	0
Florianópolis 10-10-2010
(Brazil) Vivo Minas	1
(Brazil) Brasil Vôlei Clube	3

Final
Florianópolis 10-11-2010
(Brazil) Cimed Florianópolis	3
(Brazil) Brasil Vôlei Clube	2
Third place
Florianópolis 10-11-2010
(Brazil) Sada Cruzeiro	3
(Brazil) Vivo Minas	1

=== Semifinals ===
Date		Score		Set 1	Set 2	Set 3	Set 4	Set 5	Total
Nov 10	Cimed Florianópolis (Brazil)	3–0	(Brazil) Sada Cruzeiro	25–18	25–23	25–22			75–63
Nov 10	Vivo Minas (Brazil)	1–3	(Brazil) Brasil Vôlei Clube	25–18	23–25	20–25	19-25		87–93

=== Final ===
Date		Score		Set 1	Set 2	Set 3	Set 4	Set 5	Total
Nov 10	Cimed Florianópolis (Brazil)	3–2	(Brazil) Brasil Vôlei Clube	25–19	15–25	26–24	19–25	15–13	100–106

== Final standing ==
Rank	Team
1st place, gold medalist(s)	(Brazil) Cimed Florianópolis
2nd place, silver medalist(s)	(Brazil) Brasil Vôlei Clube
3rd place, bronze medalist(s)	(Brazil) Sada Cruzeiro
4	(Brazil) Vivo Minas
5	(Argentina) Unión Formosa
5	(Colombia) COC
7	(Uruguay) Nacional de Montevideo
7	(Peru) Deportivo Wanka

Qualified for the 2009 FIVB Men's Club World Championship

2009 Men's South American Volleyball Club Champions

1st title
