= Vôlei Natal =

Brazilian volleyball club

EMS Natal FUNVIC
- Full name: EMS/Natal/Fundação Universitária Vida Cristã
- Short name: Vôlei Natal
- Founded: 2010
- Ground: Ginásio Nélio Dias (Capacity: 10,000)
- Chairman: Luís Otávio Palhari
- Manager: Javier Weber
- League: Brazilian Superliga
- 2020/21: Champions
- Website: Club home page

Uniforms
Home	Away

EMS/Natal/Fundação Universitária Vida Cristã, a.k.a. EMS Natal FUNVIC or simply Vôlei Natal, is a Brazilian professional volleyball team based in Natal, Rio Grande do Norte, Brazil. They compete in the Brazilian Superliga.

== Achievements ==
- South American Club Championship
  (x1) 2016
- Brazilian Superliga
  (x2) 2018–19, 2019-2020
  (x1) 2016–17
  (x2) 2014–15, 2015–16
- Brazilian Cup
  (x2) 2015, 2017

== Team roster ==
Team roster – season 2019/2020

No.	Name	Date of birth	Position
1	(Brazil) Leandro Vissotto Neves	April 30, 1983 (age 43)	opposite
3	(Brazil) Fabiano Jeronymo	June 11, 1986 (age 39)	setter
4	(Brazil) Rogério Filho	February 20, 1995 (age 31)	libero
5	(Cuba) Isbel Mesa	June 2, 1989 (age 37)	middle blocker
7	(Brazil) Raphael Oliveira (c)	June 14, 1979 (age 46)	setter
8	(Brazil) Ricardo Lucarelli Souza	February 14, 1992 (age 34)	outside hitter
9	(Brazil) Eduardo Sobrinho	January 19, 1996 (age 30)	setter
11	(Morocco) Mohamed Hachdadi	February 2, 1991 (age 35)	opposite
12	(Brazil) Luiz Felipe Fonteles	June 19, 1984 (age 41)	outside hitter
13	(Brazil) Maurício Souza	September 29, 1988 (age 37)	middle blocker
14	(Brazil) Douglas Souza	August 20, 1995 (age 30)	outside hitter
15	(Brazil) Pétrus Montes	May 5, 1987 (age 39)	middle blocker
16	(Brazil) Lucas Saatkamp	March 6, 1986 (age 40)	middle blocker
17	(Brazil) Thales Hoss	April 27, 1989 (age 37)	libero
18	(Brazil) Matheus Celestino	August 26, 1998 (age 27)	outside hitter
19	(Brazil) Renan Bonora	April 10, 1998 (age 28)	outside hitter
20	(Brazil) Symon Lima	August 11, 1996 (age 29)	middle blocker

Team roster - season 2018/2019
Funvic Taubaté
No.	Name	Date of birth	Position
1	(Brazil) Leandro Vissotto Neves	April 30, 1983 (age 43)	opposite
2	(Brazil) Rodrigo Honório da Silva	September 29, 1993 (age 32)	outside hitter
3	(Brazil) Fabiano Jeronymo	June 11, 1986 (age 39)	setter
4	(Brazil) Luis Fernando Venceslau	September 25, 1989 (age 36)	outside hitter
5	(Argentina) Nicolás Uriarte	March 21, 1990 (age 36)	setter
6	(Brazil) Aboubacar Neto	February 16, 1994 (age 32)	opposite
7	(Brazil) Raphael Vieira de Oliveira (c)	June 14, 1979 (age 46)	setter
8	(Brazil) Ricardo Lucarelli Souza	February 14, 1992 (age 34)	outside hitter
9	(Brazil) Robson Augusto	June 2, 1985 (age 41)	middle blocker
10	(Argentina) Facundo Conte	August 25, 1989 (age 36)	outside hitter
11	(Brazil) Aldren Brand	July 16, 1991 (age 34)	libero
12	(Brazil) Douglas Souza	August 20, 1995 (age 30)	outside hitter
13	(Brazil) Renan Moralez	January 3, 1994 (age 32)	middle blocker
14	(Brazil) Otávio Pinto	February 27, 1991 (age 35)	middle blocker
15	(Brazil) Athos Costa	November 29, 1988 (age 37)	middle blocker
16	(Brazil) Lucas Saatkamp	March 6, 1986 (age 40)	middle blocker
17	(Brazil) Thales Hoss	April 27, 1989 (age 37)	libero

Team roster - season 2017/2018
Funvic Taubaté
No.	Name	Date of birth	Position
1	(Brazil) Rodrigo Abrão	September 17, 1996 (age 29)	outside hitter
2	(Brazil) Matheus de Oliveira	May 5, 1994 (age 32)	libero
3	(Serbia) Marko Ivović	December 22, 1990 (age 35)	outside hitter
4	(Brazil) Wallace de Souza	June 26, 1987 (age 38)	opposite
5	(Brazil) Paulo Bertassoni	March 16, 1985 (age 41)	setter
6	(Brazil) Renan Santos	April 5, 1994 (age 32)	opposite
7	(Brazil) Raphael de Oliveira (c)	June 14, 1979 (age 46)	setter
8	(Brazil) Ricardo Lucarelli Souza	February 14, 1992 (age 34)	outside hitter
9	(Brazil) Lucas Madalóz	December 21, 1995 (age 30)	opposite
10	(Brazil) Nicolas Santos	March 17, 1995 (age 31)	middle blocker
11	(Argentina) Sebastián Solé	June 12, 1991 (age 34)	middle blocker
13	(Brazil) Rafael Martins	February 10, 1991 (age 35)	middle blocker
14	(Brazil) Otávio Pinto	February 27, 1991 (age 35)	middle blocker
17	(Brazil) Thales Hoss	April 27, 1989 (age 37)	libero
18	(Brazil) Dante Amaral	September 30, 1980 (age 45)	outside hitter

Team roster - season 2016/2017
Funvic Taubaté
No.	Name	Date of birth	Position
1	(Cuba) Isbel Mesa	June 2, 1989 (age 37)	middle blocker
2	(Brazil) Matheus de Oliveira	May 5, 1994 (age 32)	libero
5	(Brazil) Lucas Lóh	January 18, 1991 (age 35)	outside hitter
6	(Brazil) Danilo Gelinski	March 13, 1990 (age 36)	setter
7	(Brazil) Raphael de Oliveira (c)	June 14, 1979 (age 46)	setter
8	(Brazil) Ricardo Lucarelli Souza	February 14, 1992 (age 34)	outside hitter
9	(Brazil) André Aleixo	December 21, 1990 (age 35)	outside hitter
10	(Brazil) Vinicius Santos	May 10, 1986 (age 40)	outside hitter
11	(Brazil) Renan Santos	April 29, 1994 (age 32)	outside hitter
12	(Brazil) Jonatan Silva	April 29, 1995 (age 31)	setter
13	(Brazil) Nicolas Santos	March 17, 1995 (age 31)	middle blocker
14	(Brazil) Otávio Pinto	February 27, 1991 (age 35)	middle blocker
16	(Brazil) Éder Carbonera	October 19, 1983 (age 42)	middle blocker
17	(Brazil) Kaio Rocha	August 15, 1986 (age 39)	opposite
18	(Brazil) Wallace de Souza	June 26, 1987 (age 38)	opposite
19	(Brazil) Mário Pedreira Júnior	May 3, 1982 (age 44)	libero
