= Grêmio Recreativo e Esportivo Reunidas (men's volleyball) =

Brazilian men's volleyball team

- Short name: Vôlei Futuro
- Founded: 2006
- Dissolved: 2013
- Ground: Ginásio Municipal Dr. Plácido Rocha, Araçatuba
- Chairman: (Brazil) João Batista de Morais
- Manager: (Brazil) Cézar Douglas
- Captain: (Brazil) Ricardo Garcia
- League: Brazilian Superliga
- 2012–13: 9th
- Website: Club home page

Uniforms
Home	Away

The Grêmio Recreativo e Esportivo Reunidas, also known as Vôlei Futuro, were a Brazilian volleyball team based in Araçatuba, São Paulo. The team was folded in July 2013 after finishing ninth in the 2012–13 Brazilian Superliga.

== Current squad ==
Squad as of October 21, 2012

Number	Player	Position	Height (m)
1	(Brazil) Raphael Thiago de Oliveira	Outside hitter	1.95
2	(Brazil) Guilherme Hage	Outside hitter	2.00
8	(Brazil) Najari Carvalho	Opposite	1.98
9	(Brazil) Bruno Temponi	Outside hitter	1.90
10	(Brazil) Leandro Greca	Libero	1.94
11	(Brazil) Vinicius Siqueira	Middle blocker	1.96
12	(Brazil) Caio Fazanha	Opposite	2.04
14	(Brazil) Jairo Medeiros	Setter	1.86
15	(Brazil) Michael dos Santos	Middle blocker	2.02
17	(Brazil) Ricardo Garcia (c)	Setter	1.92
18	(Brazil) Caio de Prá	Opposite	2.02
19	(Brazil) Ialisson Amorim	Middle blocker	2.04
20	(Brazil) Alan Araújo	Outside hitter	1.95

- Head coach: (Brazil) Cézar Douglas
- Assistant coach: (Brazil) José Paulo Peron

== Honors ==
- Brazilian Superliga

Runners-up (1): 2011–12

- Campeonato Paulista

Winners (1): 2010

- Jogos Abertos do Interior

Winners (2): 2010, 2011

== See also ==
- Vôlei Futuro (women's volleyball)
