= 2009 Men's South American Volleyball Championship =

Tournament details
- Host country: Colombia
- Dates: 15–21 August
- Teams: 7
- Venue: 1 (in 1 host city)

Final positions
- Champions: Brazil (27th title)

Tournament awards
- MVP: (Brazil) Murilo Endres

The 2009 Men's South American Volleyball Championship was the 28th edition of the tournament, organised by CSV. It was held in Bogotá, Colombia from 15 to 21 August 2009.

== Teams ==
- Argentina
- Brazil
- Chile
- Colombia
- Peru
- Uruguay
- Venezuela

== Results ==
Pos	Team	Pld	W	L	Pts	SW	SL	SR	SPW	SPL	SPR
1	Brazil	6	6	0	12	18	2	9.000	501	374	1.340
2	Argentina	6	5	1	11	16	4	4.000	479	417	1.149
3	Venezuela	6	4	2	10	14	6	2.333	481	413	1.165
4	Colombia	6	3	3	9	9	9	1.000	423	393	1.076
5	Chile	6	2	4	8	6	12	0.500	365	413	0.884
6	Peru	6	1	5	7	3	17	0.176	359	478	0.751
7	Uruguay	6	0	6	6	2	18	0.111	367	487	0.754

Date		Score		Set 1	Set 2	Set 3	Set 4	Set 5	Total
15 Aug	Argentina	3–0	Peru	25–14	25–20	25–16			75–50
15 Aug	Chile	0–3	Colombia	23–25	21–25	18–25			62–75
15 Aug	Venezuela	3–0	Uruguay	25–21	25–18	25–19			75–58
16 Aug	Argentina	3–0	Uruguay	25–16	25–17	25–18			75–51
16 Aug	Brazil	3–0	Peru	25–15	25–14	25–10			75–39
16 Aug	Venezuela	3–0	Colombia	25–23	27–25	25–19			77–67
17 Aug	Venezuela	3–0	Chile	25–9	25–19	25–19			75–47
17 Aug	Brazil	3–0	Uruguay	25–17	25–19	25–15			75–51
17 Aug	Argentina	3–0	Colombia	25–22	25–22	26–24			76–68
18 Aug	Uruguay	2–3	Peru	19–25	25–21	19–25	28–26	12–15	103–112
18 Aug	Argentina	3–0	Chile	25–18	25–23	25–13			75–54
18 Aug	Brazil	3–0	Colombia	25–23	25–21	25–19			75–63
19 Aug	Argentina	3–1	Venezuela	25–20	20–25	25–21	27–25		97–91
19 Aug	Brazil	3–0	Chile	25–8	25–22	25–22			75–52
19 Aug	Colombia	3–0	Peru	25–18	25–20	25–15			75–53
20 Aug	Chile	3–0	Peru	25–19	25–21	25–19			75–59
20 Aug	Brazil	3–1	Venezuela	25–23	25–18	23–25	25–22		98–88
20 Aug	Colombia	3–0	Uruguay	25–16	25–20	25–14			75–50
21 Aug	Uruguay	0–3	Chile	18–25	20–25	16–25			54–75
21 Aug	Venezuela	3–0	Peru	25–16	25–17	25–13			75–46
21 Aug	Brazil	3–1	Argentina	28–30	25–17	25–19	25–15		103–81

== Final standing ==
Rank	Team
1st place, gold medalist(s)	Brazil
2nd place, silver medalist(s)	Argentina
3rd place, bronze medalist(s)	Venezuela
4	Colombia
5	Chile
6	Peru
7	Uruguay

2009 Men's South American champions

Brazil
27th title

== Awards ==
- MVP: (Brazil) Murilo Endres
- Best spiker: (Brazil) Gilberto Godoy Filho
- Best blocker: (Venezuela) Luis Díaz
- Best server: (Colombia) Julián Chury
- Best digger: (Venezuela) Alexis González
- Best setter: (Argentina) Luciano De Cecco
- Best receiver: (Venezuela) Enderwuin Herrera
- Best libero: (Brazil) Sérgio Santos
