= Floripa Esporte Clube =

Brazilian volleyball club

Floripa
- Full name: Floripa Esporte Clube
- Short name: Floripa
- Founded: 2005
- Ground: Saul Oliveira

Uniforms
Home	Away

Floripa Esporte Clube, also known as Super Imperatriz Vôlei, was a men's volleyball team, based in Florianópolis, Santa Catarina, Brazil. They won the Superliga Brasileira de Voleibol in 2005–06, 2007–08 and in 2008–09, and won the South American Championship in 2009. They played at Arena Jaraguá. The club was formerly known as Cimed Esporte Clube. The team was folded in July 2013 after finishing tenth in the 2012–13 Brazilian Superliga.

== Titles ==
- South American Championship:
  - Winners (1): 2009
- Superliga:
  - Winners (4): 2005–06, 2007–08, 2008–09, 2009–10
  - Runners-up (1): 2006–07
