= Associação Social e Esportiva Sada =

Brazilian men's volleyball club

Sada Cruzeiro
- Full name: Sada Cruzeiro Vôlei
- Short name: Sada Cruzeiro
- Founded: 2006
- Ground: Ginásio Poliesportivo do Riacho (Capacity: 8,100)
- Chairman: Vittorio Medioli
- Manager: Filipe Ferraz
- League: Brazilian Superliga
- 2024/25: Champions
- Website: Club home page

Uniforms
Home	Away

Sada Cruzeiro Vôlei is a Brazilian professional volleyball team based in Contagem, Minas Gerais, Brazil. They have five titles in the FIVB Men's Club World Volleyball Championship, tied with Italy's Trentino Itas as the most successful men's teams in volleyball history. At national and continental levels, they compete in the Brazilian Superliga, with nine titles and won a record of 11 times the South American Championships.

== History ==
Founded in 2006 in Betim, part of the Belo Horizonte metropolitan area in the state of Minas Gerais, Sada merged with Cruzeiro in 2009 and is now based in neighbouring Contagem.

The volleyball team was founded in 2006 as "Sada Betim" and had the Grupo Sada as the main sponsor. Throughout the years, Sada, the company based in Betim, Minas Gerais, has become responsible for managing the "Club", and in 2008 the "Associação Social e Esportiva Sada" was created.

In 2009 the partnership with Cruzeiro Esporte Clube, a traditional Brazilian football club was formalized, and the team gained one of the largest volleyball fan-bases in the country driven by Cruzeiro's about eight million supporters.

Sada Cruzeiro is the only Brazilian volleyball club to ever win the FIVB Volleyball Men's Club World Championship.

== Team ==
Squad as of October 2019

Team roster – season 2019/2020
No.	Name	Date of birth	Position
1	(Brazil) Luan Weber	12 February 1991 (age 34)	opposite
2	(Canada) John Perrin	17 August 1989 (age 36)	outside hitter
3	(Brazil) Lucas de Deus	26 January 1987 (age 38)	libero
4	(Brazil) Otávio Pinto	27 February 1991 (age 34)	middle blocker
6	(Brazil) Rodrigo Leme	9 April 1980 (age 45)	setter
7	(Argentina) Facundo Conte	25 August 1989 (age 36)	outside hitter
8	(Brazil) Evandro Guerra	27 December 1981 (age 43)	opposite
10	(Brazil) Cledenilson Batista	9 June 1998 (age 27)	middle blocker
11	(Brazil) Rodrigo Leão	5 June 1996 (age 29)	outside hitter
12	(Brazil) Isac Santos	13 December 1990 (age 34)	middle blocker
14	(Brazil) Fernando Kreling	13 January 1996 (age 29)	setter
15	(Brazil) Lucas Silva	28 August 1999 (age 26)	libero
17	(Brazil) Welinton Oppenkoski	27 March 2000 (age 25)	opposite
18	(Brazil) Filipe Ferraz (c)	1 March 1980 (age 45)	outside hitter
19	(Brazil) Davi Pozzobon	16 June 1996 (age 29)	outside hitter
20	(Brazil) Hugo Hamacher	13 April 1991 (age 34)	outside hitter

Team roster – season 2018/2019
No.	Name	Date of birth	Position
1	(Brazil) Luan Weber	12 February 1991 (age 34)	opposite
3	(Brazil) Éder Kock	4 July 1993 (age 32)	middle blocker
4	(Brazil) Leonardo Nascimento	16 March 1995 (age 30)	outside hitter
5	(Brazil) Sandro Carvalho	2 April 1981 (age 44)	setter
6	(Brazil) Robert Araujo	10 March 1996 (age 29)	middle blocker
8	(Brazil) Evandro Guerra	27 December 1981 (age 43)	opposite
10	(France) Kevin Le Roux	11 May 1989 (age 36)	middle blocker
11	(Brazil) Rodrigo Leão	5 June 1996 (age 29)	outside hitter
12	(Brazil) Isac Santos	13 December 1990 (age 34)	middle blocker
14	(Brazil) Fernando Kreling	13 January 1996 (age 29)	setter
15	(United States) Taylor Sander	17 March 1992 (age 33)	outside hitter
16	(Brazil) Lucas Bauer	20 October 1999 (age 26)	libero
17	(Brazil) Sérgio Nogueira	25 August 1978 (age 47)	libero
18	(Brazil) Filipe Ferraz (c)	1 March 1980 (age 45)	outside hitter
19	(Brazil) Davi Pozzobon	16 June 1996 (age 29)	outside hitter

Team roster – season 2017/2018
No.	Name	Date of birth	Position
1	(Brazil) Pablo Ventura	29 April 1998 (age 27)	outside hitter
2	(Brazil) Rodrigo Telles	3 March 1990 (age 35)	opposite
3	(Brazil) Éder Kock	4 July 1993 (age 32)	middle blocker
5	(Argentina) Nicolás Uriarte	21 March 1990 (age 35)	setter
6	(Brazil) Robert Araujo	10 March 1996 (age 29)	middle blocker
7	(Brazil) Lucas Silva	28 September 1999 (age 26)	libero
8	(Brazil) Evandro Guerra	27 December 1981 (age 43)	opposite
9	(Brazil) Yoandry Leal	31 August 1988 (age 37)	outside hitter
10	(Cuba) Robertlandy Simón	11 June 1987 (age 38)	middle blocker
11	(Brazil) Rodrigo Leão	5 June 1996 (age 29)	outside hitter
12	(Brazil) Isac Santos	13 December 1990 (age 34)	middle blocker
14	(Brazil) Fernando Kreling	13 January 1996 (age 29)	setter
17	(Brazil) Sérgio Nogueira	25 August 1978 (age 47)	libero
18	(Brazil) Filipe Ferraz (c)	1 March 1980 (age 45)	outside hitter
Head coach: Marcelo Méndez; Assistant: Humberto Martelete

== Achievements and titles ==
- FIVB Club World Championship
  (x5) 2013, 2015, 2016, 2021, 2024
  (x2) 2012, 2019
  (x2) 2017, 2022
- South American Championship
  (x11) 2012, 2014, 2016, 2017, 2018, 2019, 2020, 2022, 2023, 2024, 2025
  (x1) 2015
  (x1) 2009
- Brazilian Superliga
  (x9) 2011–12, 2013–14, 2014–15, 2015–16, 2016–17, 2017–18, 2021–22, 2022–23, 2024–25
  (x2) 2010–11, 2012–13
- Brazilian Cup
  (x8) 2014, 2016, 2018, 2019, 2020, 2021, 2023, 2024
- Brazilian Super Cup
  (x6) 2016, 2017, 2018, 2022, 2023, 2024
- Minas Gerais State Championship
  (x17) 2008, 2010, 2011, 2012, 2013, 2014, 2015, 2016, 2017, 2018, 2019, 2020, 2021, 2022, 2023, 2024, 2025
  (x1) 2006

== Kit providers ==
The table below shows the history of kit providers for Sada volleyball team.

Period	Kit provider
2012–2015	Olympikus; Penalty
2016–2019	Umbro
2020–	Adidas

=== Sponsorship ===
Primary sponsors include: main sponsors like Sada Transporte, other sponsors: Mitsubishi Motors, Molten Corporation, Amil Participacoes SA and Mater Dei.

== See also ==
- Cruzeiro Esporte Clube
- Cruzeiro Esporte Clube (women)
