= Brazilian Volleyball Super League (men) =

National men's volleyball championship of Brazil

Superliga Brasileira de Voleibol
- Formerly: Liga Nacional; Campeonato Brasileiro
- Sport: Volleyball
- Founded: 1976; 50 years ago since 1994 (current format)
- Administrator: Brazilian Volleyball Confederation
- No. of teams: 12
- Country: Brazil
- Confederation: CBV
- Most recent champion: Sada Cruzeiro Vôlei (10th title) (2025–26)
- Most titles: Sada Cruzeiro Vôlei (10 titles)
- Broadcasters: SporTV and Globo
- Relegation to: Superliga Série B
- Domestic cups: Brazilian Cup; Brazilian Supercopa
- Website: superliga.br

The Brazilian Volleyball Super League (Portuguese: Superliga Brasileira de Voleibol) is the top level Brazilian professional volleyball competition. It is organized by the Brazilian Volleyball Confederation. It shares the same name with the women's tournament, and are disputed simultaneously. The number of participating clubs varies every year. The champion team qualifies for the South American Championship.

== History ==
=== First competitions ===
Until the early 1960s, there were only state volleyball competitions in Brazil. A national level competition was inconceivable because of the geographical distances and lack of transportation infrastructure. Only in 1962 the first national volleyball competition was disputed, the Guarani Trophy of Champion clubs (Portuguese: Troféu Guarani de Clubes Campeões). The competition was disputed two more times, being renamed in 1964 to Brazilian Championship of Champion Clubs (Portuguese: Campeonato Brasileiro de Clubes Campeões). Between 1965 and 1967 there was a hiatus without a national level competition, until the Brazilian Trophy (Portuguese: Taça Brasil) was organized in 1968 with teams from Rio de Janeiro, São Paulo and Minas Gerais. The competition was organized in such format until 1975.

=== Fully national competition and professionalism ===
Only in 1976, the competition was opened to amateur clubs from all Brazilian states, and became truly national. It was renamed to Brazilian Championship (Portuguese: Campeonato Brasileiro) and was held every second year. In 1980 the Brazilian Championship had a major reorganization, becoming an annual competition and allowing professional teams for the first time. The competition's format changed in 1988, and started to follow the Northern Hemisphere calendar. Also, it was renamed to Brazilian National League (Portuguese: Liga Nacional). The competition was disputed under this format between the seasons 1988-89 and 1993–94.

=== The foundation of Super League ===
There was a last major change in the organization of the competition in the 1994–95 season. Again, it was renamed to Brazilian National Super League (Portuguese: Superliga Nacional). The first champion of the tournament, with the present format, was Frangosul/Ginástica.

== List of champions ==
=== Campeonato Brasileiro ===
Year	Champion	Runners-up
1976	Botafogo	Paulistano
1978	Banespa/São Paulo	Flamengo
1980	Pirelli/Santo André	Fluminense
1981	Atlântica/Boavista	Pirelli/Santo André
1982	Pirelli/Santo André	Atlântica/Boavista
1983	Pirelli/Santo André	Bradesco/Atlântica
1984	Minas	Atlântica/Boavista
1985	Minas	Bradesco/Atlântica
1986	Fiat/Minas	Bradesco/Atlântica
1987	Banespa/São Paulo	Pirelli/Santo André

=== Liga Nacional ===
1988–89	Pirelli/Santo André	Fiat/Minas
1989–90	Banespa/São Paulo	Pirelli/Santo André
1990–91	Banespa/São Paulo	Frangosul/Ginástica
1991–92	Banespa/São Paulo	Pirelli/Santo André
1992–93	Hoechst/Suzano	Rhodia/Pirelli
1993–94	Nossa Caixa/Suzano	Palmeiras/Parmalat

=== Superliga ===
1994–95	Frangosul/Ginástica	Nossa Caixa/Suzano
1995–96	Olympikus/Telesp	Report/Suzano
1996–97	Report/Suzano	Banespa/São Bernardo do Campo
1997–98	Diadora/Ulbra	Olympikus/Rio de Janeiro
1998–99	Pepsi/Ulbra	Report/Nipomed/Suzano
1999–2000	Telemig Celular/Minas	Unisul
2000–01	Telemig Celular/Minas	Ulbra
2001–02	Telemig Celular/Minas	Banespa/São Bernardo do Campo
2002–03	Ulbra	Unisul
2003–04	Unisul	Ulbra
2004–05	Banespa/MasterCard	Telemig Celular/Minas
2005–06	Cimed/Florianópolis	Telemig Celular/Minas
2006–07	Telemig Celular/Minas	Cimed/Florianópolis
2007–08	Cimed/Florianópolis	Vivo/Minas
2008–09	Cimed/Florianópolis	Vivo/Minas
2009–10	Cimed/Florianópolis	Montes Claros/Funadem
2010–11	SESI-SP	Sada Cruzeiro Vôlei
2011–12	Sada Cruzeiro Vôlei	Vôlei Futuro
2012–13	RJX	Sada Cruzeiro Vôlei
2013–14	Sada Cruzeiro Vôlei	SESI-SP
2014–15	Sada Cruzeiro Vôlei	SESI-SP
2015–16	Sada Cruzeiro Vôlei	Vôlei Brasil Kirin
2016–17	Sada Cruzeiro Vôlei	Funvic Taubaté
2017–18	Sada Cruzeiro Vôlei	SESI-SP
2018–19	Funvic Taubaté	SESI-SP
2019–20	Canceled during the regular season due to the COVID-19 pandemic.
2020–21	Funvic Taubaté	Minas
2021–22	Sada Cruzeiro Vôlei	Minas
2022–23	Sada Cruzeiro Vôlei	Minas
2023–24	SESI-SP	Vôlei Renata
2024–25	Sada Cruzeiro Vôlei	Vôlei Renata
2025–26	Sada Cruzeiro Vôlei	Vôlei Renata

=== Titles by team ===
Club	Winners	Runners-up
Sada/Cruzeiro	10 (2012, 2014, 2015, 2016, 2017, 2018, 2022, 2023, 2025, 2026)	2 (2011, 2013)
Minas	7 (1984, 1985, 1986, 2000, 2001, 2002, 2007)	8 (1989, 2005, 2006, 2008, 2009, 2021, 2022, 2023)
Banespa	6 (1978, 1987, 1990, 1991, 1992, 2005)	2 (1997, 2002)
Pirelli	4 (1980, 1982, 1983, 1989)	5 (1981, 1987, 1990, 1992, 1993)
Cimed/Florianópolis	4 (2006, 2008, 2009, 2010)	1 (2007)
Suzano	3 (1993, 1994, 1997)	3 (1995, 1996, 1999)
Ulbra	3 (1998, 1999, 2003)	2 (2001, 2004)
Taubaté	2 (2019, 2021)	1 (2017)
SESI-SP	2 (2011, 2024)	4 (2014, 2015, 2018, 2019)
Atlântica	1 (1981)	5 (1982, 1983, 1984, 1985, 1986)
Unisul	1 (2004)	2 (2000, 2003)
Ginástica	1 (1995)	1 (1991)
Olympikus	1 (1996)	1 (1998)
Botafogo	1 (1976)	0
RJX	1 (2013)	0
Vôlei Renata/Campinas	0	4 (2016, 2024, 2025, 2026)
Flamengo	0	1 (1978)
Fluminense	0	1 (1980)
Montes Claros	0	1 (2010)
Palmeiras	0	1 (1994)
Paulistano	0	1 (1976)

== Women's league ==
The Women's Superliga most successful team have been Rio de Janeiro Vôlei Clube with eleven titles, since the creation of the Superliga, when Leites Nestlé won three consecutives titles from 1994–95 to 1996–97.
