= 2016–17 CEV Cup =

- League: CEV Cup
- Sport: Volleyball
- Duration: 6 December 2016 – 15 April 2017

Finals
- Champions: (France) Tours VB
- Runners-up: (Italy) Trentino Diatec
- Finals MVP: (Czech Republic) David Konečný (TOU)

CEV Cup seasons
- ← 2015–16 2017–18 →

The 2016–17 CEV Cup was the 45th edition of the European CEV Cup volleyball club tournament.

French club Tours VB beat multi-titled Italian Trentino Diatec in finals. Czech opposite David Konečný, playing for the winning team, was titled Most Valuable Player.

== Participating teams ==
The number of participants on the basis of ranking list for European Cup Competitions:

Rank	Country	Number of teams	Teams
1	Russia	1	Gazprom-Ugra Surgut
2	Italy	2	Trentino Diatec, LPR Volley Piacenza
3	Turkey	1	Fenerbahce SK Istanbul
5	Germany	1	United Volleys Rhein-Main
6	Belgium	2	Topvolley Antwerpen, Lindemans Aalst
7	France	2 +1	GFCO Ajaccio, Tours VB, Arago de Sète (CL Q3)
8	Romania	2	Stiinta Explorari Baia Mare, C.S. Arcada Galati
9	Czech Republic	2	ČEZ Karlovarsko, Volejbal Brno
10	Greece	1 +1	Olympiacos Piraeus, PAOK Thessaloniki (CL Q3)
11	Bulgaria	2 +1	CSKA Sofia, Dobrudja 07 Dobrich (CL Q2), Levski Sofia
12	Austria	1 +1	Posojilnica Aich/Dob, Hypo Tirol Innsbruck (CL Q3)
13	Serbia	3 +1	Crvena Zvezda (CL Q3), Vojvodina NS Seme Novi Sad, Nis Nis, OK Novi Pazar
14	Switzerland	0 +1	Volley Amriswil (CL Q3)
15	Slovenia	1	Calcit Kamnik
16	Finland	3 +1	Kokkolan Tiikerit (CL Q3), Hurrikaani Loimaa, VaLePa Sastamala, Raision Loimu
18	Montenegro	1 +1	Budvanska Rivijera Budva (CL Q2), Jedinstvo Bemax Bijelo Polje
19	Ukraine	2	Lokomotyv Kharkiv, Barkom-Kazhany Lviv
20	Netherlands	0 +1	Lycurgus Groningen (CL Q3)
21	Belarus	0 +1	VK Stroitel Minsk (CL Q2)
22	Estonia	0 +1	Selver Tallinn (CL Q2)
23	Bosnia and Herzegovina	1	OK Mladost Brčko
24	Israel	1 +1	Hapoel Mate-Asher Akko (CL Q2), Hapoel Yoav Kfar Saba
25	Croatia	0 +1	Mladost Ribola Kaštela (CL Q2)
28	Cyprus	0 +1	Omonoia Nicosia (CL Q2)
34	Denmark	0 +1	Gentofte Volley (CL Q3)
–	Kosovo	0 +1	KV Pëja (CL Q2)

== Main phase ==
=== 32nd Finals ===
Team 1	Agg.	Team 2	1st leg	2nd leg	Golden Set
Topvolley Callant Antwerpen (Belgium)	4–4	(Croatia) Mladost Ribola Kaštela	3–1	1–3	15–7
Hurrikaani Loimaa (Finland)	6–1	(Bulgaria) Dobrudja 07 Dobrich	3–0	3–1	
Stiinta Explorari Baia Mare (Romania)	2–6	(Israel) Hapoel Mate-Asher Akko	2–3	0–3	
ČEZ Karlovarsko (Czech Republic)	6–2	(Estonia) Selver Tallinn	3–1	3–1	
OK Mladost Brčko (Bosnia and Herzegovina)	5–3	(Kosovo) KV Pëja	3–0	2–3	
OK Novi Pazar (Serbia)	6–2	(Cyprus) Omonia Nicosia	3–0	3–2	
LPR Volley Piacenza (Italy)	6–2	(Belarus) Stroitel Minsk	3–1	3–1	
Raision Loimu (Finland)	4–6	(Montenegro) Budvanska Rivijera Budva	2–3	2–3	
Barkom-Kazhany Lviv (Ukraine)	3–4	(Serbia) Vojvodina NS Seme Novi Sad	3–1	0–3	13–15
Tours VB (France)	6–3	(Slovenia) Calcit Kamnik	3–1	3–2	
Nis Nis (Serbia)	0–6	(Finland) VaLePa Sastamala	0–3	0–3	
Levski Sofia (Bulgaria)	6–0	(Montenegro) Jedinstvo Bemax Bijelo Polje	3–0	3–0	
Hapoel Yoav Kfar Saba (Israel)	6–0	(Ukraine) Lokomotyv Kharkiv	3–0	3–0	

==== First leg ====
Date	Time		Score		Set 1	Set 2	Set 3	Set 4	Set 5	Total	Report
7 Dec	20:30	Topvolley Callant Antwerpen (Belgium)	3–1	(Croatia) Mladost Ribola Kaštela	25–17	20–25	29–27	25–19		99–88	Report
7 Dec	18:30	Hurrikaani Loimaa (Finland)	3–0	(Bulgaria) Dobrudja 07 Dobrich	25–14	26–24	25–16			76–54	Report
7 Dec	18:00	Stiinta Explorari Baia Mare (Romania)	2–3	(Israel) Hapoel Mate-Asher Akko	28–30	25–23	16–25	25–22	13–15	107–115	Report
7 Dec	18:00	ČEZ Karlovarsko (Czech Republic)	3–1	(Estonia) Selver Tallinn	25–17	25–22	21–25	25–14		96–78	Report
–	–	OK Mladost Brčko (Bosnia and Herzegovina)	3–0	(Kosovo) KV Pëja	25–0	25–0	25–0			75–0	Report
8 Dec	18:00	OK Novi Pazar (Serbia)	3–0	(Cyprus) Omonia Nicosia	25–16	25–17	25–17			75–50	Report
8 Dec	18:00	LPR Volley Piacenza (Italy)	3–1	(Belarus) Stroitel Minsk	26–24	30–28	21–25	25–22		102–99	Report
6 Dec	15:00	Raision Loimu (Finland)	2–3	(Montenegro) Budvanska Rivijera Budva	23–25	28–30	25–22	25–19	10–15	111–111	Report
7 Dec	19:00	Barkom-Kazhany Lviv (Ukraine)	3–1	(Serbia) Vojvodina NS Seme Novi Sad	20–25	25–20	25–14	25–22		95–81	Report
6 Dec	20:00	Tours VB (France)	3–1	(Slovenia) Calcit Kamnik	23–25	25–13	25–12	25–19		98–69	Report
21 Dec	17:00	Nis Nis (Serbia)	0–3	(Finland) VaLePa Sastamala	18–25	19–25	15–25			52–75	Report
7 Dec	18:30	Levski Sofia (Bulgaria)	3–0	(Montenegro) Jedinstvo Bemax Bijelo Polje	25–18	25–14	25–18			75–50	Report
–	–	Hapoel Yoav Kfar Saba (Israel)	3–0	(Ukraine) Lokomotyv Kharkiv	25–0	25–0	25–0			75–0	Report

==== Second leg ====
Date	Time		Score		Set 1	Set 2	Set 3	Set 4	Set 5	Total	Report
21 Dec	19:00	Mladost Ribola Kaštela (Croatia)	3–1	(Belgium) Topvolley Callant Antwerpen	25–19	25–19	19–25	25–19		94–82	Report
Golden set		Mladost Ribola Kaštela (Croatia)	7–15	(Belgium) Topvolley Callant Antwerpen							
22 Dec	20:00	Dobrudja 07 Dobrich (Bulgaria)	1–3	(Finland) Hurrikaani Loimaa	17–25	28–26	26–28	19–25		90–104	Report
20 Dec	19:00	Hapoel Mate-Asher Akko (Israel)	3–0	(Romania) Stiinta Explorari Baia Mare	25–22	25–15	25–21			75–58	Report
21 Dec	19:00	Selver Tallinn (Estonia)	1–3	(Czech Republic) ČEZ Karlovarsko	21–25	22–25	25–16	16–25		84–91	Report
20 Dec	18:00	KV Pëja (Kosovo)	3–2	(Bosnia and Herzegovina) OK Mladost Brčko	22–25	21–25	25–20	25–18	15–12	108–100	Report
20 Dec	19:00	Omonia Nicosia (Cyprus)	2–3	(Serbia) OK Novi Pazar	25–19	25–22	21–25	23–25	13–15	107–106	Report
20 Dec	18:00	Stroitel Minsk (Belarus)	1–3	(Italy) LPR Volley Piacenza	25–23	14–25	21–25	20–25		80–98	Report
20 Dec	18:00	Budvanska Rivijera Budva (Montenegro)	3–2	(Finland) Raision Loimu	25–22	25–23	20–25	21–25	17–15	108–110	Report
21 Dec	19:00	Vojvodina NS Seme Novi Sad (Serbia)	3–0	(Ukraine) Barkom-Kazhany Lviv	25–14	25–22	25–20			75–56	Report
Golden set		Vojvodina NS Seme Novi Sad (Serbia)	15–13	(Ukraine) Barkom-Kazhany Lviv							
20 Dec	19:00	Calcit Kamnik (Slovenia)	2–3	(France) Tours VB	20–25	16–25	27–25	25–21	9–15	97–111	Report
8 Dec	21:00	VaLePa Sastamala (Finland)	3–0	(Serbia) Nis Nis	25–11	25–13	25–20			75–44	Report
22 Dec	19:00	Jedinstvo Bemax Bijelo Polje (Montenegro)	0–3	(Bulgaria) Levski Sofia	15–25	19–25	18–25			52–75	Report
–	–	Lokomotyv Kharkiv (Ukraine)	0–3	(Israel) Hapoel Yoav Kfar Saba	0–25	0–25	0–25			0–75	Report

=== 16th Finals ===
The 16 winning teams from the Round of 32 will compete in the Eighthfinals playing home & away matches.

Team 1	Agg.	Team 2	1st leg	2nd leg	Golden Set
Olympiacos Piraeus (Greece)	4–5	(Russia) Gazprom-Ugra Surgut	3–2	1–3	
ČEZ Karlovarsko (Czech Republic)	5–4	(Finland) Kokkolan Tiikerit	2–3	3–1	
OK Novi Pazar (Serbia)	3–6	(Greece) PAOK Thessaloniki	1–3	2–3	
Tours VB (France)	6–1	(Czech Republic) Volejbal Brno	3–0	3–1	
Hapoel Yoav Kfar Saba (Israel)	0–6	(Belgium) Lindemans Aalst	0–3	0–3	
Posojilnica Aich/Dob (Austria)	3–4	(France) Arago de Sète	3–1	0–3	13–15
Topvolley Callant Antwerpen (Belgium)	4–3	(Serbia) Crvena Zvezda Belgrade	3–0	1–3	20–22
OK Mladost Brčko (Bosnia and Herzegovina)	0–6	(Germany) United Volleys Rhein-Main	0–3	0–3	
Hapoel Mate-Asher Akko (Israel)	0–6	(Turkey) Fenerbahce SK Istanbul	0–3	0–3	
Levski Sofia (Bulgaria)	5–3	(Netherlands) Abiant Lycurgus Groningen	3–0	2–3	
CSKA Sofia (Bulgaria)	4–4	(Switzerland) Volley Amriswil	3–1	1–3	8–15
Budvanska Rivijera Budva (Montenegro)	0–6	(France) GFC Ajaccio	0–3	0–3	
Vojvodina NS Seme Novi Sad (Serbia)	5–3	(Romania) C.S. Arcada Galati	3–0	2–3	
LPR Volley Piacenza (Italy)	6–1	(Austria) Hypo Tirol Innsbruck	3–0	3–1	
VaLePa Sastamala (Finland)	6–0	(Denmark) Gentofte Volley	3–0	3–0	
Hurrikaani Loimaa (Finland)	0–6	(Italy) Trentino Diatec	0–3	0–3	

==== First leg ====
Date	Time		Score		Set 1	Set 2	Set 3	Set 4	Set 5	Total	Report
5 Jan	19:00	Olympiacos Piraeus (Greece)	3–2	(Russia) Gazprom-Ugra Surgut	25–23	25–27	22–25	25–19	15–13	112–107	Report
4 Jan	16:30	ČEZ Karlovarsko (Czech Republic)	2–3	(Finland) Kokkolan Tiikerit	25–23	28–26	20–25	16–25	12–15	101–114	Report
5 Jan	18:00	OK Novi Pazar (Serbia)	1–3	(Greece) PAOK Thessaloniki	23–25	25–22	15–25	21–25		84–97	Report
4 Jan	20:00	Tours VB (France)	3–0	(Czech Republic) Volejbal Brno	25–17	34–32	25–13			84–62	Report
4 Jan	17:00	Hapoel Yoav Kfar Saba (Israel)	0–3	(Belgium) Lindemans Aalst	12–25	18–25	24–26			54–76	Report
4 Jan	19:00	Posojilnica Aich/Dob (Austria)	3–1	(France) Arago de Sète	25–16	25–20	25–27	25–19		100–82	Report
5 Jan	20:30	Topvolley Callant Antwerpen (Belgium)	3–0	(Serbia) Crvena Zvezda Belgrade	25–23	25–23	25–22			75–68	Report
4 Jan	19:00	OK Mladost Brčko (Bosnia and Herzegovina)	0–3	(Germany) United Volleys Rhein-Main	12–25	13–25	26–28			51–78	Report
5 Jan	17:30	Hapoel Mate-Asher Akko (Israel)	0–3	(Turkey) Fenerbahce SK Istanbul	22–25	17–25	18–25			57–75	Report
10 Jan	18:00	Levski Sofia (Bulgaria)	3–0	(Netherlands) Abiant Lycurgus Groningen	25–22	26–24	27–25			78–71	Report
11 Jan	19:00	CSKA Sofia (Bulgaria)	3–1	(Switzerland) Volley Amriswil	25–16	25–22	18–25	25–17		93–80	Report
3 Jan	18:00	Budvanska Rivijera Budva (Montenegro)	0–3	(France) GFC Ajaccio	23–25	18–25	25–27			66–77	Report
11 Jan	19:00	Vojvodina NS Seme Novi Sad (Serbia)	3–0	(Romania) C.S. Arcada Galati	25–16	25–21	25–22			75–59	Report
4 Jan	20:30	LPR Volley Piacenza (Italy)	3–0	(Austria) Hypo Tirol Innsbruck	25–21	25–22	25–12			75–55	Report
4 Jan	18:30	VaLePa Sastamala (Finland)	3–0	(Denmark) Gentofte Volley	25–22	25–23	25–23			75–68	Report
5 Jan	18:30	Hurrikaani Loimaa (Finland)	0–3	(Italy) Trentino Diatec	16–25	21–25	20–25			57–75	Report

==== Second leg ====
Date	Time		Score		Set 1	Set 2	Set 3	Set 4	Set 5	Total	Report
18 Jan	19:00	Gazprom-Ugra Surgut (Russia)	3–1	(Greece) Olympiacos Piraeus	25–18	17–25	25–15	25–18		92–76	Report
17 Jan	18:30	Kokkolan Tiikerit (Finland)	1–3	(Czech Republic) ČEZ Karlovarsko	29–27	19–25	18–25	23–25		89–102	Report
19 Jan	19:00	PAOK Thessaloniki (Greece)	3–2	(Serbia) OK Novi Pazar	18–25	25–17	20–25	28–26	18–16	109–109	Report
19 Jan	18:00	Volejbal Brno (Czech Republic)	1–3	(France) Tours VB	19–25	14–25	25–22	23–25		81–97	Report
18 Jan	20:30	Lindemans Aalst (Belgium)	3–0	(Israel) Hapoel Yoav Kfar Saba	25–17	25–13	25–18			75–48	Report
18 Jan	19:30	Arago de Sète (France)	3–0	(Austria) Posojilnica Aich/Dob	25–23	25–16	25–19			75–58	Report
Golden set		Arago de Sète (France)	15–13	(Austria) Posojilnica Aich/Dob							
18 Jan	19:00	Crvena Zvezda Belgrade (Serbia)	3–1	(Belgium) Topvolley Callant Antwerpen	18–25	25–21	25–22	25–18		93–86	Report
Golden set		Crvena Zvezda Belgrade (Serbia)	22–20	(Belgium) Topvolley Callant Antwerpen							
18 Jan	19:30	United Volleys Rhein-Main (Germany)	3–0	(Bosnia and Herzegovina) OK Mladost Brčko	25–13	25–9	25–13			75–35	Report
18 Jan	18:30	Fenerbahce SK Istanbul (Turkey)	3–0	(Israel) Hapoel Mate-Asher Akko	25–23	25–20	25–20			75–63	Report
18 Jan	19:00	Abiant Lycurgus Groningen (Netherlands)	3–2	(Bulgaria) Levski Sofia	25–22	23–25	25–20	20–25	15–9	108–101	Report
18 Jan	19:00	Volley Amriswil (Switzerland)	3–1	(Bulgaria) CSKA Sofia	25–22	25–22	25–27	25–17		100–88	Report
Golden set		Volley Amriswil (Switzerland)	15–8	(Bulgaria) CSKA Sofia							
17 Jan	20:00	GFC Ajaccio (France)	3–0	(Montenegro) Budvanska Rivijera Budva	25–20	25–11	28–26			78–57	Report
18 Jan	17:00	C.S. Arcada Galati (Romania)	3–2	(Serbia) Vojvodina NS Seme Novi Sad	25–19	22–25	22–25	25–21	15–12	109–102	Report
18 Jan	19:00	Hypo Tirol Innsbruck (Austria)	1–3	(Italy) LPR Volley Piacenza	20–25	16–25	25–12	23–25		84–87	Report
17 Jan	19:00	Gentofte Volley (Denmark)	0–3	(Finland) VaLePa Sastamala	23–25	29–31	21–25			73–81	Report
18 Jan	20:30	Trentino Diatec (Italy)	3–0	(Finland) Hurrikaani Loimaa	25–18	25–19	25–19			75–56	Report

=== 8th Finals ===
The 8 winning teams from the eighthfinals will compete in the quarterfinals playing home & away matches.

Team 1	Agg.	Team 2	1st leg	2nd leg	Golden Set
Gazprom-Ugra Surgut (Russia)	1–6	(Czech Republic) ČEZ Karlovarsko	1–3	0–3	
PAOK Thessaloniki (Greece)	3–6	(France) Tours VB	2–3	1–3	
Arago de Sète (France)	1–6	(Belgium) Lindemans Aalst	1–3	0–3	
United Volleys Rhein-Main (Germany)	6–1	(Serbia) Crvena Zvezda Belgrade	3–1	3–0	
Levski Sofia (Bulgaria)	0–6	(Turkey) Fenerbahce SK Istanbul	0–3	0–3	
GFC Ajaccio (France)	4–4	(Switzerland) Volley Amriswil	3–1	1–3	15–12
LPR Volley Piacenza (Italy)	6–0	(Serbia) Vojvodina NS Seme Novi Sad	3–0	3–0	
VaLePa Sastamala (Finland)	1–6	(Italy) Trentino Diatec	0–3	1–3	

==== First leg ====
Date	Time		Score		Set 1	Set 2	Set 3	Set 4	Set 5	Total	Report
1 Feb	19:00	Gazprom-Ugra Surgut (Russia)	1–3	(Czech Republic) ČEZ Karlovarsko	25–20	23–25	24–26	18–25		90–96	Report
1 Feb	19:00	PAOK Thessaloniki (Greece)	2–3	(France) Tours VB	14–25	25–23	22–25	25–21	13–15	99–109	Report
31 Jan	19:30	Arago de Sète (France)	1–3	(Belgium) Lindemans Aalst	21–25	25–20	22–25	23–25		91–95	Report
31 Jan	19:30	United Volleys Rhein-Main (Germany)	3–1	(Serbia) Crvena Zvezda Belgrade	23–25	25–13	25–16	25–18		98–72	Report
1 Feb	19:30	Levski Sofia (Bulgaria)	0–3	(Turkey) Fenerbahce SK Istanbul	16–25	16–25	17–25			49–75	Report
31 Jan	20:00	GFC Ajaccio (France)	3–1	(Switzerland) Volley Amriswil	25–22	26–24	18–25	25–21		94–92	Report
1 Feb	20:30	LPR Volley Piacenza (Italy)	3–0	(Serbia) Vojvodina NS Seme Novi Sad	25–20	25–16	27–25			77–61	Report
2 Feb	18:30	VaLePa Sastamala (Finland)	0–3	(Italy) Trentino Diatec	23–25	28–30	18–25			69–80	Report

==== Second leg ====
Date	Time		Score		Set 1	Set 2	Set 3	Set 4	Set 5	Total	Report
14 Feb	18:00	ČEZ Karlovarsko (Czech Republic)	3–0	(Russia) Gazprom-Ugra Surgut	25–20	25–21	25–21			75–62	Report
15 Feb	20:00	Tours VB (France)	3–1	(Greece) PAOK Thessaloniki	25–19	20–25	25–19	25–19		95–82	Report
15 Feb	20:30	Lindemans Aalst (Belgium)	3–0	(France) Arago de Sète	25–19	25–22	25–20			75–61	Report
14 Feb	19:00	Crvena Zvezda Belgrade (Serbia)	0–3	(Germany) United Volleys Rhein-Main	23–25	21–25	19–25			63–75	Report
16 Feb	18:30	Fenerbahce SK Istanbul (Turkey)	3–0	(Bulgaria) Levski Sofia	25–12	25–20	25–23			75–55	Report
15 Feb	19:00	Volley Amriswil (Switzerland)	3–1	(France) GFC Ajaccio	25–20	16–25	25–22	25–17		91–84	Report
Golden set		Volley Amriswil (Switzerland)	12–15	(France) GFC Ajaccio							
15 Feb	19:00	Vojvodina NS Seme Novi Sad (Serbia)	0–3	(Italy) LPR Volley Piacenza	19–25	23–25	22–25			64–75	Report
15 Feb	20:30	Trentino Diatec (Italy)	3–1	(Finland) VaLePa Sastamala	22–25	30–28	25–12	25–20		102–85	Report

=== 4th Finals ===
Team 1	Agg.	Team 2	1st leg	2nd leg
ČEZ Karlovarsko (Czech Republic)	2–6	(France) Tours VB	0–3	2–3
United Volleys Rhein-Main (Germany)	6–2	(Belgium) Lindemans Aalst	3–0	3–2
Fenerbahce SK Istanbul (Turkey)	6–1	(France) GFC Ajaccio	3–0	3–1
LPR Volley Piacenza (Italy)	1–6	(Italy) Trentino Diatec	0–3	1–3

==== First leg ====
Date	Time		Score		Set 1	Set 2	Set 3	Set 4	Set 5	Total	Report
2 Mar	18:00	ČEZ Karlovarsko (Czech Republic)	0–3	(France) Tours VB	17–25	19–25	18–25			54–75	Report
2 Mar	19:30	United Volleys Rhein-Main (Germany)	3–0	(Belgium) Lindemans Aalst	25–21	26–24	25–20			76–65	Report
2 Mar	19:00	Fenerbahce SK Istanbul (Turkey)	3–0	(France) GFC Ajaccio	26–24	25–14	25–18			76–56	Report
1 Mar	20:30	LPR Volley Piacenza (Italy)	0–3	(Italy) Trentino Diatec	19–25	23–25	21–25			63–75	Report

==== Second leg ====
Date	Time		Score		Set 1	Set 2	Set 3	Set 4	Set 5	Total	Report
14 Mar	20:00	Tours VB (France)	3–2	(Czech Republic) ČEZ Karlovarsko	25–18	25–22	18–25	22–25	15–13	105–103	Report
15 Mar	20:30	Lindemans Aalst (Belgium)	2–3	(Germany) United Volleys Rhein-Main	25–21	30–32	17–25	25–22	9–15	106–115	Report
15 Mar	20:00	GFC Ajaccio (France)	1–3	(Turkey) Fenerbahce SK Istanbul	25–23	22–25	16–25	22–25		85–98	Report
15 Mar	20:30	Trentino Diatec (Italy)	3–1	(Italy) LPR Volley Piacenza	25–20	25–22	22–25	25–15		97–82	Report

== Final phase ==
=== Semi finals ===
Team 1	Agg.	Team 2	1st leg	2nd leg
Tours VB (France)	6–2	(Germany) United Volleys Rhein-Main	3–0	3–2
Trentino Diatec (Italy)	5–3	(Turkey) Fenerbahce SK Istanbul	3–0	2–3

==== First leg ====
Date	Time		Score		Set 1	Set 2	Set 3	Set 4	Set 5	Total	Report
28 Mar	20:00	Tours VB (France)	3–0	(Germany) United Volleys Rhein-Main	25–21	25–19	25–21			75–61	Report
28 Mar	20:30	Trentino Diatec (Italy)	3–0	(Turkey) Fenerbahce SK Istanbul	25–15	25–12	25–23			75–50	Report

==== Second leg ====
Date	Time		Score		Set 1	Set 2	Set 3	Set 4	Set 5	Total	Report
1 Apr	15:00	United Volleys Rhein-Main (Germany)	2–3	(France) Tours VB	25–17	22–25	25–27	25–15	12–15	109–99	Report
1 Apr	19:00	Fenerbahce SK Istanbul (Turkey)	3–2	(Italy) Trentino Diatec	25–20	22–25	29–27	19–25	15–6	110–103	Report

=== Final ===
==== First leg ====
Date	Time		Score		Set 1	Set 2	Set 3	Set 4	Set 5	Total	Report
12 Apr	20:30	Trentino Diatec (Italy)	3–0	(France) Tours VB	25–14	25–19	25–17			75–50	Report

==== Second leg ====
Date	Time		Score		Set 1	Set 2	Set 3	Set 4	Set 5	Total	Report
15 Apr	20:30	Tours VB (France)	3–1	(Italy) Trentino Diatec	31–29	22–25	25–22	25–23		103–99	Report
Golden set		Tours VB (France)	15–13	(Italy) Trentino Diatec							

== Final standing ==
Rank	Team
1st place, gold medalist(s)	(France) Tours VB
2nd place, silver medalist(s)	(Italy) Trentino Diatec
Semifinalists	(Germany) United Volleys Rhein-Main
Semifinalists	(Turkey) Fenerbahce SK Istanbul

2017 CEV Cup winner
(France)
Tours VB
1st title

Guillermo Hernán, Hubert Henno, Thomas Nevot, Quentin Jouffroy, David Konecny, Chris Zuidberg, Ryley Barnes, Theo Conre, Daniel Jansen Van Doorn, Philipp Collin, Stanislas Rabiller, Lévi Alves Cabral, Martin Masson, Antoine Fleury
Head coach
Giampaolo Medei
