= 2021 FIVB Volleyball Men's Club World Championship squads =

This article shows the rosters of all participating teams at the 2021 FIVB Volleyball Men's Club World Championship in Betim, Brazil.

== Cucine Lube Civitanova ==
The following is the roster of the Italian club Cucine Lube Civitanova in the 2021 FIVB Volleyball Men's Club World Championship.

No.	Name	Date of birth	Height	Position
1	(Puerto Rico) Gabriel García Fernández	8 January 1999	2.00 m (6 ft 7 in)	opposite
2	(Italy) Jiří Kovář	10 April 1989	2.02 m (6 ft 8 in)	outside hitter
3	(Italy) Daniele Sottile	17 August 1979	1.86 m (6 ft 1 in)	setter
4	(Italy) Andrea Marchisio	6 November 1990	1.86 m (6 ft 1 in)	libero
5	(Italy) Osmany Juantorena	12 August 1985	2.00 m (6 ft 7 in)	outside hitter
6	(Italy) Rok Jerončič	10 November 2001	2.07 m (6 ft 9 in)	middle blocker
7	(Italy) Fabio Balaso	20 October 1995	1.78 m (5 ft 10 in)	libero
8	(Brazil) Ricardo Lucarelli	14 February 1992	1.96 m (6 ft 5 in)	outside hitter
9	(Italy) Ivan Zaytsev	2 October 1988	2.04 m (6 ft 8 in)	opposite
12	(Italy) Enrico Diamantini	4 April 1993	2.04 m (6 ft 8 in)	middle blocker
13	(Cuba) Robertlandy Simón	11 June 1987	2.08 m (6 ft 10 in)	middle blocker
15	(Argentina) Luciano De Cecco	2 June 1988	1.94 m (6 ft 4 in)	setter
17	(Italy) Simone Anzani	24 February 1992	2.03 m (6 ft 8 in)	middle blocker
23	(Cuba) Marlon Yant	23 May 2001	2.04 m (6 ft 8 in)	outside hitter
Head coach:		(Italy) Gianlorenzo Blengini		

== Sirjan Foolad ==
The following is the roster of the Iranian club Sirjan Foolad in the 2021 FIVB Volleyball Men's Club World Championship.

No.	Name	Date of birth	Height	Position
1	(Iran) Sahand Allah Verdian	8 December 1995	1.99 m (6 ft 6 in)	middle blocker
2	(Iran) Mahdi Jelveh Ghaziani	21 May 2001	2.08 m (6 ft 10 in)	middle blocker
3	(Serbia) Aleksandar Blagojevic	5 August 1993	1.97 m (6 ft 6 in)	opposite
5	(Iran) Amir Hossein Derakhshan	2 August 1986	1.98 m (6 ft 6 in)	setter
6	(Iran) Reza Abedini	19 May 1991	2.03 m (6 ft 8 in)	middle blocker
8	(Iran) Rasoul Shahsavari Nejad	21 January 1993	1.82 m (6 ft 0 in)	libero
9	(Iran) Ehsan Daneshdoust	1 January 2000	1.92 m (6 ft 4 in)	outside hitter
10	(Iran) Mohammad Sadeghi Malati	28 August 1994	2.04 m (6 ft 8 in)	outside hitter
12	(Iran) Mojtaba Gholizad	26 March 1990	1.96 m (6 ft 5 in)	outside hitter
13	(Iran) Alireza Behbodi	10 March 1979	1.92 m (6 ft 4 in)	setter
14	(Iran) Amirhossein Esfandiar	24 January 1999	2.09 m (6 ft 10 in)	outside hitter
18	(Iran) Armin Tashakkori	8 December 1986	2.00 m (6 ft 7 in)	middle blocker
20	(Iran) Mostafa Heydari	14 December 1991	1.75 m (5 ft 9 in)	libero
Head coach:		(Iran) Saeid Rezaei		

== Funvic Natal ==
The following is the roster of the Brazilian club Funvic Natal in the 2021 FIVB Volleyball Men's Club World Championship.

No.	Name	Date of birth	Height	Position
1	(Brazil) Matheus Krauchuk	4 November 1997	1.97 m (6 ft 6 in)	opposite
6	(United States) Patrick Gasman	2 January 1997	2.08 m (6 ft 10 in)	middle blocker
7	(Brazil) Murilo Radke	31 January 1989	1.99 m (6 ft 6 in)	setter
8	(Brazil) André Ludegards	27 September 1999	1.86 m (6 ft 1 in)	outside hitter
10	(Brazil) Vitor Yudi	12 March 1999	1.85 m (6 ft 1 in)	libero
11	(Brazil) João Mossa	22 August 2000	1.90 m (6 ft 3 in)	setter
12	(Brazil) Gabriel Santos	18 May 1997	0.00 m (0 in)	opposite
13	(Brazil) Gabriel Garcia	25 May 1997	0.00 m (0 in)	setter
15	(Brazil) Riad Ribeiro	2 October 1981	2.04 m (6 ft 8 in)	middle blocker
16	(Brazil) Felipe Brito	1 October 1998	2.05 m (6 ft 9 in)	middle blocker
17	(Brazil) Thales Hoss	26 April 1989	1.90 m (6 ft 3 in)	libero
18	(Brazil) Felipe Roque	19 May 1997	2.05 m (6 ft 9 in)	opposite
19	(Brazil) Symon Lima	11 August 1996	0.00 m (0 in)	middle blocker
20	(Brazil) Fábio Rodrigues	26 July 1995	1.99 m (6 ft 6 in)	outside hitter
Head coach:		(Brazil) João Conceição		

== Sada Cruzeiro ==
The following is the roster of the Brazilian club Sada Cruzeiro in the 2021 FIVB Volleyball Men's Club World Championship.

No.	Name	Date of birth	Height	Position
1	(Brazil) Welinton Oppenkoski	28 March 2000	1.98 m (6 ft 6 in)	opposite
3	(Brazil) Lucas de Deus	26 January 1987	1.78 m (5 ft 10 in)	libero
4	(Brazil) Otávio Pinto	27 February 1991	2.02 m (6 ft 8 in)	middle blocker
5	(Brazil) Lucas Lóh	18 January 1991	1.96 m (6 ft 5 in)	outside hitter
6	(Brazil) Guilherme Rech	5 January 2001	2.02 m (6 ft 8 in)	middle blocker
8	(Brazil) Wallace de Souza	26 June 1987	1.98 m (6 ft 6 in)	opposite
10	(Brazil) Cledenilson Souza	9 June 1998	2.10 m (6 ft 11 in)	middle blocker
11	(Brazil) Rodrigo Leão	5 June 1996	1.97 m (6 ft 6 in)	outside hitter
12	(Brazil) Isac Santos	13 December 1990	2.08 m (6 ft 10 in)	middle blocker
14	(Brazil) Fernando Kreling	13 June 1996	1.85 m (6 ft 1 in)	setter
16	(Brazil) Lucas Bauer	20 October 1999	1.92 m (6 ft 4 in)	libero
17	(Brazil) Rhendrick Rosa	11 February 1999	1.82 m (6 ft 0 in)	setter
18	(Brazil) Matias Provensi	26 March 2001	2.01 m (6 ft 7 in)	outside hitter
19	(Cuba) Miguel Ángel López	25 March 1997	1.90 m (6 ft 3 in)	outside hitter
Head coach:		(Brazil) Filipe Ferraz		

== Itas Trentino ==
The following is the roster of the Italian club Itas Trentino in the 2021 FIVB Volleyball Men's Club World Championship.

No.	Name	Date of birth	Height	Position
1	(Bulgaria) Matey Kaziyski	23 September 1984	2.03 m (6 ft 8 in)	outside hitter
3	(Belgium) Wout D'Heer	26 April 2001	2.03 m (6 ft 8 in)	middle blocker
5	(Italy) Alessandro Michieletto	5 December 2001	2.05 m (6 ft 9 in)	outside hitter
6	(Italy) Riccardo Sbertoli	23 May 1998	1.90 m (6 ft 3 in)	setter
7	(Italy) Oreste Cavuto	5 December 1996	2.00 m (6 ft 7 in)	outside hitter
10	(Italy) Giulio Pinali	2 April 1997	1.98 m (6 ft 6 in)	opposite
12	(Italy) Daniele Albergati	21 June 1993	2.00 m (6 ft 7 in)	opposite
15	(Italy) Daniele Lavia	4 November 1999	1.95 m (6 ft 5 in)	outside hitter
16	(Germany) Julian Zenger	1 January 1997	1.90 m (6 ft 3 in)	libero
18	(Serbia) Marko Podraščanin	29 August 1987	2.03 m (6 ft 8 in)	middle blocker
20	(Serbia) Srećko Lisinac	17 May 1992	2.05 m (6 ft 9 in)	middle blocker
22	(Italy) Lorenzo Sperotto	28 April 1999	1.90 m (6 ft 3 in)	setter
24	(Italy) Carlo De Angelis	10 January 1996	1.90 m (6 ft 3 in)	libero
Head coach:		(Italy) Angelo Lorenzetti		

== UPCN San Juan ==
The following is the roster of the Argentine club UPCN San Juan in the 2021 FIVB Volleyball Men's Club World Championship.

No.	Name	Date of birth	Height	Position
1	(Argentina) Matías Olivieri	10 March 2002	1.90 m (6 ft 3 in)	middle blocker
2	(Argentina) Brian Melgarejo	28 March 1995	1.91 m (6 ft 3 in)	outside hitter
5	(Argentina) Lucas Ibazeta	19 September 2002	1.82 m (6 ft 0 in)	outside hitter
6	(Argentina) Mateo Bozikovich	6 March 1992	1.89 m (6 ft 2 in)	setter
7	(Argentina) Franco Cáceres	28 March 1994	2.00 m (6 ft 7 in)	opposite
9	(Argentina) Sebastián Brajkovic	10 February 1982	1.95 m (6 ft 5 in)	setter
11	(Argentina) Manuel Armoa	1 December 2002	1.95 m (6 ft 5 in)	outside hitter
14	(Brazil) Igor Gonçalves	4 January 1988	2.05 m (6 ft 9 in)	opposite
15	(Argentina) Agustín Gallardo	1 March 2001	1.95 m (6 ft 5 in)	middle blocker
16	(Colombia) Joan Jaraba	20 September 1997	2.01 m (6 ft 7 in)	middle blocker
17	(Argentina) Matías Salvo	25 January 1991	1.82 m (6 ft 0 in)	libero
18	(Argentina) Fabián Flores	25 May 1991	1.98 m (6 ft 6 in)	middle blocker
19	(Brazil) Jailton da Silva Junior	23 September 1993	2.03 m (6 ft 8 in)	outside hitter
20	(Argentina) Nicolás Perren	15 May 1995	1.63 m (5 ft 4 in)	libero
Head coach:		(Argentina) Fabián Armoa		
