= 2011 Men's Pan-American Volleyball Cup =

Tournament details
- Host country: Canada
- Dates: June 13 – 18
- Teams: 10
- Venue: Robert Guertin Centre (in Gatineau host cities)

Final positions
- Champions: Brazil (1st title)

Tournament awards
- MVP: (Brazil) Paulo Victor Silva

The 2011 Pan-American Volleyball Cup was the sixth edition of the annual men's volleyball tournament, played by ten countries over June 13 – 18, 2011 in Gatineau, Quebec, Canada. The event served as a qualifier for the 2012 FIVB World League qualification.

Brazil won the tournament after beating the United States 3–2 in the final.

== Competing nations ==
Group A	Group B	Group C
Brazil; Mexico; Venezuela	Canada; Dominican Republic; Puerto Rico	Argentina; Bahamas; Panama; United States

== Preliminary round ==
=== Group A ===
Pos	Team	Pld	W	L	Pts	SW	SL	SR	SPW	SPL	SPR	Qualification
1	Brazil	2	2	0	6	6	0	MAX	150	105	1.429	Semifinals
2	Mexico	2	1	1	2	3	5	0.600	154	158	0.975	Quarterfinals
3	Venezuela	2	0	2	1	2	6	0.333	141	178	0.792	

June 13, 2011; 20:00	Brazil	3–0	Mexico	Robert Guertin Centre; Report; Attendance: 375; Referees: Josmer Pérez (PAN), Brian Hemelgarn (USA)
June 13, 2011; 20:00	(25–22, 25–20, 25–15)			Robert Guertin Centre; Report; Attendance: 375; Referees: Josmer Pérez (PAN), Brian Hemelgarn (USA)

June 14, 2011; 18:00	Venezuela	2–3	Mexico	Robert Guertin Centre; Report; Attendance: 374; Referees: Brian Hemelgarn (USA), Josmer Pérez (PAN)
June 14, 2011; 18:00	(16–25, 25–23, 25–23, 15–25, 13–15)			Robert Guertin Centre; Report; Attendance: 374; Referees: Brian Hemelgarn (USA), Josmer Pérez (PAN)

June 15, 2011; 15:00	Brazil	3–0	Venezuela	Robert Guertin Centre; Report; Attendance: 190; Referees: Yury Ramírez (DOM), Brian Hemelgarn (USA)
June 15, 2011; 15:00	(25–23, 25–14, 25–11)			Robert Guertin Centre; Report; Attendance: 190; Referees: Yury Ramírez (DOM), Brian Hemelgarn (USA)

=== Group B ===
Pos	Team	Pld	W	L	Pts	SW	SL	SR	SPW	SPL	SPR	Qualification
1	Canada	2	2	0	6	6	0	MAX	150	106	1.415	Quarterfinals
2	Puerto Rico	2	1	1	3	3	4	0.750	154	168	0.917	Quarterfinals
3	Dominican Republic	2	0	2	0	1	6	0.167	148	178	0.831	

June 13, 2011; 12:30	Canada	3–0	Puerto Rico	Robert Guertin Centre; Report; Attendance: 600; Referees: Hernán Casamiquela (ARG), Saúl Sosa (MEX)
June 13, 2011; 12:30	(25–17, 25–17, 25–17)			Robert Guertin Centre; Report; Attendance: 600; Referees: Hernán Casamiquela (ARG), Saúl Sosa (MEX)

June 14, 2011; 20:00	Dominican Republic	1–3	Puerto Rico	Robert Guertin Centre; Report; Attendance: 200; Referees: Saúl Sosa (MEX), Kirkwood Farquharson (BAH)
June 14, 2011; 20:00	(27–25, 23–25, 26–28, 17–25)			Robert Guertin Centre; Report; Attendance: 200; Referees: Saúl Sosa (MEX), Kirkwood Farquharson (BAH)

June 15, 2011; 20:00	Canada	3–0	Dominican Republic	Robert Guertin Centre; Report; Attendance: 733; Referees: Kirkwood Farquharson (BAH), Hernán Casamiquela (ARG)
June 15, 2011; 20:00	(25–18, 25–23, 25–14)			Robert Guertin Centre; Report; Attendance: 733; Referees: Kirkwood Farquharson (BAH), Hernán Casamiquela (ARG)

=== Group C ===
Pos	Team	Pld	W	L	Pts	SW	SL	SR	SPW	SPL	SPR	Qualification
1	United States	3	3	0	9	9	0	MAX	225	132	1.705	Semifinals
2	Argentina	3	2	1	6	6	3	2.000	205	180	1.139	Quarterfinals
3	Panama	3	1	2	3	3	7	0.429	193	238	0.811	
4	Bahamas	3	0	3	0	1	9	0.111	171	244	0.701	

June 13, 2011; 15:00	United States	3–0	Bahamas	Robert Guertin Centre; Report; Attendance: 500; Referees: Andrew Robb (CAN), Yury Ramírez (DOM)
June 13, 2011; 15:00	(25–14, 25–12, 25–12)			Robert Guertin Centre; Report; Attendance: 500; Referees: Andrew Robb (CAN), Yury Ramírez (DOM)

June 13, 2011; 18:00	Argentina	3–0	Panama	Robert Guertin Centre; Report; Attendance: 352; Referees: Juan Rivera (PUR), Felipe Turchiari (BRA)
June 13, 2011; 18:00	(25–16, 25–23, 25–21)			Robert Guertin Centre; Report; Attendance: 352; Referees: Juan Rivera (PUR), Felipe Turchiari (BRA)

June 14, 2011; 13:00	Argentina	3–0	Bahamas	Robert Guertin Centre; Report; Attendance: 100; Referees: Andrew Robb (CAN), Abrahin Cruces (VEN)
June 14, 2011; 13:00	(25–20, 25–16, 25–9)			Robert Guertin Centre; Report; Attendance: 100; Referees: Andrew Robb (CAN), Abrahin Cruces (VEN)

June 14, 2011; 15:00	United States	3–0	Panama	Robert Guertin Centre; Report; Attendance: 243; Referees: Felipe Turchiari (BRA), Juan Rivera (PUR)
June 14, 2011; 15:00	(25–14, 25–14, 25–11)			Robert Guertin Centre; Report; Attendance: 243; Referees: Felipe Turchiari (BRA), Juan Rivera (PUR)

June 15, 2011; 13:00	Panama	3–1	Bahamas	Robert Guertin Centre; Report; Attendance: 150; Referees: Abrahin Cruces (VEN), Juan Rivera (PUR)
June 15, 2011; 13:00	(19–25, 25–23, 25–22, 25–18)			Robert Guertin Centre; Report; Attendance: 150; Referees: Abrahin Cruces (VEN), Juan Rivera (PUR)

June 15, 2011; 18:00	United States	3–0	Argentina	Robert Guertin Centre; Report; Attendance: 425; Referees: Felipe Turchiari (BRA), Andrew Robb (CAN)
June 15, 2011; 18:00	(25–15, 25–21, 25–19)			Robert Guertin Centre; Report; Attendance: 425; Referees: Felipe Turchiari (BRA), Andrew Robb (CAN)

== Final round ==
=== Championship bracket ===
Quarterfinals
B1	Canada	3
A2	Mexico	1
C2	Argentina	1
B2	Puerto Rico	3

Semifinals
A1	Brazil	3
B1	Canada	0
C1	United States	3
B2	Puerto Rico	0

Finals
A1	Brazil	3
C1	United States	1
Third place
B1	Canada	3
B2	Puerto Rico	0

=== 5th–10th places bracket ===
Classification 5–10
C3	Panama	0
A3	Venezuela	3
B3	Dominican Republic	3
C4	Bahamas	2

Classification 5–8
C2	Argentina	1
A3	Venezuela	3
A2	Mexico	3
B3	Dominican Republic	0
Classification 9–10
C3	Panama	1
C4	Bahamas	3

Classification 5–6
A3	Venezuela	0
A2	Mexico	3
Classification 7–8
C2	Argentina	3
B3	Dominican Republic	1

=== Classification 5–10 ===
June 16, 2011; 13:00	Panama	0–3	Venezuela	Robert Guertin Centre; Report; Attendance: 100; Referees: Juan Rivera (PUR), Saúl Sosa (MEX)
June 16, 2011; 13:00	(20–25, 13–25, 15–25)			Robert Guertin Centre; Report; Attendance: 100; Referees: Juan Rivera (PUR), Saúl Sosa (MEX)

June 16, 2011; 15:00	Dominican Republic	3–2	Bahamas	Robert Guertin Centre; Report; Attendance: 100; Referees: Josmer Pérez (PAN), Abrahin Cruces (VEN)
June 16, 2011; 15:00	(25–20, 25–14, 22–25, 23–25, 15–12)			Robert Guertin Centre; Report; Attendance: 100; Referees: Josmer Pérez (PAN), Abrahin Cruces (VEN)

=== Quarterfinals ===
June 16, 2011; 18:00	Argentina	1–3	Puerto Rico	Robert Guertin Centre; Report; Attendance: 321; Referees: Yury Ramírez (DOM), Felipe Turchiari (VEN)
June 16, 2011; 18:00	(20–25, 17–25, 25–20, 25–27)			Robert Guertin Centre; Report; Attendance: 321; Referees: Yury Ramírez (DOM), Felipe Turchiari (VEN)

June 16, 2011; 20:00	Canada	3–1	Mexico	Robert Guertin Centre; Report; Attendance: 721; Referees: Hernán Casamiquela (ARG), Brian Hemelgarn (USA)
June 16, 2011; 20:00	(22–25, 25–21, 25–19, 25–18)			Robert Guertin Centre; Report; Attendance: 721; Referees: Hernán Casamiquela (ARG), Brian Hemelgarn (USA)

=== Classification 9–10 ===
June 17, 2011; 11:00	Panama	1–3	Bahamas	Robert Guertin Centre; Report; Attendance: 75; Referees: Saúl Sosa (MEX), Abrahin Cruces (VEN)
June 17, 2011; 11:00	(25–21, 16–25, 22–25, 18–25)			Robert Guertin Centre; Report; Attendance: 75; Referees: Saúl Sosa (MEX), Abrahin Cruces (VEN)

=== Classification 5–8 ===
June 17, 2011; 13:00	Venezuela	3–1	Argentina	Robert Guertin Centre; Report; Attendance: 100; Referees: Josmer Pérez (PAN), Kirkwood Farquharson (BAH)
June 17, 2011; 13:00	(25–11, 26–24, 16–25, 27–25)			Robert Guertin Centre; Report; Attendance: 100; Referees: Josmer Pérez (PAN), Kirkwood Farquharson (BAH)

June 17, 2011; 15:00	Dominican Republic	0–3	Mexico	Robert Guertin Centre; Report; Attendance: 152; Referees: Andrew Robb (CAN), Brian Hemelgarn (USA)
June 17, 2011; 15:00	(21–25, 22–25, 23–25)			Robert Guertin Centre; Report; Attendance: 152; Referees: Andrew Robb (CAN), Brian Hemelgarn (USA)

=== Semifinals ===
June 17, 2011; 18:00	United States	3–0	Puerto Rico	Robert Guertin Centre; Report; Attendance: 679; Referees: Felipe Turchiari (BRA), Hernán Casamiquela (ARG)
June 17, 2011; 18:00	(25–18, 25–17, 25–14)			Robert Guertin Centre; Report; Attendance: 679; Referees: Felipe Turchiari (BRA), Hernán Casamiquela (ARG)

June 17, 2011; 20:00	Brazil	3–0	Canada	Robert Guertin Centre; Report; Attendance: 1,057; Referees: Juan Rivera (PUR), Yury Ramírez (DOM)
June 17, 2011; 20:00	(25–20, 29–27, 25–16)			Robert Guertin Centre; Report; Attendance: 1,057; Referees: Juan Rivera (PUR), Yury Ramírez (DOM)

=== Classification 7–8 ===
June 18, 2011; 13:00	Argentina	3–1	Dominican Republic	Robert Guertin Centre; Report; Attendance: 205; Referees: Felipe Turchiari (BRA), Andrew Robb (CAN)
June 18, 2011; 13:00	(25–21, 25–21, 22–25, 25–15)			Robert Guertin Centre; Report; Attendance: 205; Referees: Felipe Turchiari (BRA), Andrew Robb (CAN)

=== Classification 5–6 ===
June 18, 2011; 15:00	Venezuela	W.O.	Mexico	Robert Guertin Centre
June 18, 2011; 15:00	(0–25, 0–25, 0–25)			Robert Guertin Centre

=== Classification 3–4 ===
June 18, 2011; 18:00	Puerto Rico	0–3	Canada	Robert Guertin Centre; Report; Attendance: 1,269; Referees: Brian Hemelgarn (USA), Abrahin Cruces (VEN)
June 18, 2011; 18:00	(14–25, 20–25, 21–25)			Robert Guertin Centre; Report; Attendance: 1,269; Referees: Brian Hemelgarn (USA), Abrahin Cruces (VEN)

=== Final ===
June 18, 2011; 20:00	United States	1–3	Brazil	Robert Guertin Centre; Report; Attendance: 1,325; Referees: Hernán Casamiquela (ARG), Yury Ramírez (DOM)
June 18, 2011; 20:00	(23–25, 25–21, 17–25, 26–28)			Robert Guertin Centre; Report; Attendance: 1,325; Referees: Hernán Casamiquela (ARG), Yury Ramírez (DOM)

== Final standing ==
Rank	Team
1st place, gold medalist(s)	Brazil
2nd place, silver medalist(s)	United States
3rd place, bronze medalist(s)	Canada
4	Puerto Rico
5	Mexico
6	Venezuela
7	Argentina
8	Dominican Republic
9	Bahamas
10	Panama

2011 Men's Pan-American Cup champions

Brazil
1st title

  - Canada qualified for the 2012 FIVB World League qualification.

== Awards ==
- MVP: (Brazil) Paulo Victor Silva
- Best scorer: (Canada) Gavin Schmitt
- Best spiker: (Canada) Gavin Schmitt
- Best blocker: (The Bahamas) Byron Ferguson
- Best server: (Dominican Republic) Pedro Luis García
- Best digger: (Brazil) Lucas Provenzano
- Best setter: (Brazil) Raphael Margarido
- Best receiver: (Brazil) Thiago Sens
- Best libero: (Puerto Rico) Jose Mulero
