= 2016–17 CEV Champions League qualification =

This article shows the qualification phase for the 2017 CEV Champions League. A total of 24 teams will enter qualification round. 12 teams have directly qualified to the League round based on the European Cups’ Ranking List.

== Qualification Summary ==
| Rank | Country | Vacancies | Qualified teams |
|---|---|---|---|
| 1 | Russia | 2 | Zenit Kazan |
| 1 | Russia | 2 | Dinamo Moscow |
| 2 | Italy | 2 | DHL Modena |
| 2 | Italy | 2 | Cucine Lube Civitanova |
| 3 | Turkey | 2 | Halkbank Ankara |
| 3 | Turkey | 2 | İstanbul Büyükşehir Belediyesi |
| 4 | Poland | 2 | ZAKSA Kędzierzyn-Koźle |
| 4 | Poland | 2 | Asseco Resovia Rzeszów |
| 5 | Germany | 1 | Berlin Recycling Volleys |
| 6 | Belgium | 1 | Knack Roeselare |
| 7 | France | 1 | Paris Volley |
| 8 | Romania | 1 | SCM U Craiova |
| Qualification round | | 8 | Belogorie Belgorod |
| Qualification round | | 8 | Sir Safety Umbria Volley |
| Qualification round | | 8 | Arkas Izmir |
| Qualification round | | 8 | PGE Skra Bełchatów |
| Qualification round | | 8 | VfB Friedrichshafen |
| Qualification round | | 8 | Noliko Maaseik |
| Qualification round | | 8 | ACH Volley |
| Qualification round | | 8 | VK Dukla Liberec |

== Participating teams ==
- (Croatia) Mladost Marina Kaštela
- (Denmark) Gentofte Volley
- (Netherlands) Abiant Lycurgus
- (Russia) Belogorie Belgorod
- (Montenegro) Budvanska Rivijera Budva
- (Austria) Hypo Tirol Innsbruck
- (Finland) Tiikerit Kokkola
- (Israel) Hapoel Mate-Asher Akko
- (Italy) Sir Safety Perugia
- (Serbia) Crvena Zvezda Beograd
- (Estonia) Selver Tallinn
- (Kosovo) KV Besa Pëja
- (Switzerland) Volley Amriswil
- (Cyprus) Omonoia Nicosia
- (Czech Republic) Dukla Liberec
- (Bulgaria) Dobrudja 07 Dobrich
- (Germany) VfB Friedrichshafen
- (Greece) PAOK Thessaloniki
- (Slovenia) ACH Volley Ljubljana
- (France) Arago de Sete
- (Belgium) Noliko Maaseik
- (Poland) PGE Skra Bełchatów
- (Turkey) Arkas Izmir
- (Belarus) Stroitel Minsk

== First round ==
- No first round matches

== Second round ==
- Home-Away matches.
  16 teams will play in the Second round
  Winners will advance to the Third round; losers will compete in 32nd Finals of 2017 CEV Cup
- All times are local

| Team 1 | Agg. | Team 2 | 1st leg | 2nd leg | Golden Set |
|---|---|---|---|---|---|
| Mladost Marina Kaštela (Croatia) | 2–4 | (Greece) PAOK Thessaloniki | 2–3 | 2–3 | |
| Abiant Lycurgus (Netherlands) | 4–2 | (Bulgaria) Dobrudja 07 Dobrich | 3–0 | 2–3 | |
| Hapoel Mate-Asher Akko (Israel) | 0–6 | (Austria) Hypo Tirol Innsbruck | 1–3 | 0–3 | |
| Selver Tallinn (Estonia) | 3–3 | (Serbia) Crvena Zvezda Beograd | 3–2 | 2–3 | 9–15 |
| KV Besa Pëja (Kosovo) | 0–6 | (Switzerland) Volley Amriswil | 0–3 | 0–3 | |
| Omonoia Nicosia (Cyprus) | 0–6 | (Slovenia) ACH Volley Ljubljana | 0–3 | 0–3 | |
| Stroitel Minsk (Belarus) | 3–3 | (Finland) Tiikerit Kokkola | 3–1 | 1–3 | 13–15 |
| Gentofte Volley (Denmark) | 6–0 | (Montenegro) Budvanska Rivijera Budva | 3–0 | 3–1 | |

=== First leg ===
| Date | Time | | Score | | Set 1 | Set 2 | Set 3 | Set 4 | Set 5 | Total | Report |
|---|---|---|---|---|---|---|---|---|---|---|---|
| 1 Nov | 17:00 | Stroitel Minsk (Belarus) | 3–1 | (Finland) Tiikerit Kokkola | 25–21 | 25–22 | 13–25 | 25–17 | | 88–85 | Report |
| 2 Nov | 18:00 | KV Besa Pëja (Kosovo) | 0–3 | (Switzerland) Volley Amriswil | 16–25 | 16–25 | 15–25 | | | 47–75 | Report |
| 2 Nov | 19:00 | Mladost Marina Kaštela (Croatia) | 2–3 | (Greece) PAOK Thessaloniki | 20–25 | 25–19 | 24–26 | 31–29 | 12–15 | 112–114 | Report |
| 2 Nov | 19:00 | Abiant Lycurgus (Netherlands) | 3–0 | (Bulgaria) Dobrudja 07 Dobrich | 26–24 | 25–23 | 25–23 | | | 76–70 | Report |
| 2 Nov | 19:00 | Selver Tallinn (Estonia) | 3–2 | (Serbia) Crvena Zvezda Beograd | 25–21 | 25–21 | 17–25 | 20–25 | 19–17 | 106–109 | Report |
| 2 Nov | 19:00 | Omonoia Nicosia (Cyprus) | 0–3 | (Slovenia) ACH Volley Ljubljana | 16–25 | 23–25 | 18–25 | | | 57–75 | Report |
| 2 Nov | 19:00 | Gentofte Volley (Denmark) | 3–0 | (Montenegro) Budvanska Rivijera Budva | 25–15 | 25–17 | 25–18 | | | 75–50 | Report |
| 5 Nov | 15:00 | Hapoel Mate-Asher Akko (Israel) | 1–3 | (Austria) Hypo Tirol Innsbruck | 22–25 | 25–22 | 21–25 | 11–25 | | 79–97 | Report |

=== Second leg ===
| Date | Time | | Score | | Set 1 | Set 2 | Set 3 | Set 4 | Set 5 | Total | Report |
|---|---|---|---|---|---|---|---|---|---|---|---|
| 6 Nov | 16:00 | Budvanska Rivijera Budva (Montenegro) | 1–3 | (Denmark) Gentofte Volley | 25–20 | 22–25 | 16–25 | 17–25 | | 80–95 | Report |
| 6 Nov | 16:00 | Volley Amriswil (Switzerland) | 3–0 | (Kosovo) KV Besa Pëja | 25–14 | 25–16 | 25–18 | | | 75–48 | Report |
| 6 Nov | 17:00 | Tiikerit Kokkola (Finland) | 3–1 | (Belarus) Stroitel Minsk | 20–25 | 25–23 | 25–20 | 25–19 | | 95–87 | Report |
| Golden set | | Tiikerit Kokkola (Finland) | 15–13 | (Belarus) Stroitel Minsk | | | | | | | |
| 6 Nov | 18:00 | PAOK Thessaloniki (Greece) | 3–2 | (Croatia) Mladost Marina Kaštela | 20–25 | 25–9 | 22–25 | 25–21 | 15–10 | 107–90 | Report |
| 6 Nov | 18:00 | ACH Volley Ljubljana (Slovenia) | 3–0 | (Cyprus) Omonoia Nicosia | 25–23 | 25–21 | 25–21 | | | 75–65 | Report |
| 6 Nov | 20:00 | Crvena Zvezda Beograd (Serbia) | 3–2 | (Estonia) Selver Tallinn | 23–25 | 18–25 | 25–22 | 25–11 | 15–12 | 106–95 | Report |
| Golden set | | Crvena Zvezda Beograd (Serbia) | 15–9 | (Estonia) Selver Tallinn | | | | | | | |
| 8 Nov | 20:00 | Dobrudja 07 Dobrich (Bulgaria) | 3–2 | (Netherlands) Abiant Lycurgus | 25–19 | 24–26 | 27–25 | 19-25 | 15-13 | 110–70 | Report |
| 9 Nov | 20:15 | Hypo Tirol Innsbruck (Austria) | 3–0 | (Israel) Hapoel Mate-Asher Akko | 25–21 | 25–10 | 25–21 | | | 75–52 | Report |

== Third round ==
- Home-Away matches.
- Eight teams have received byes into the Third round.
- Winners will qualify to the League round; losers will compete in the 16th Finals of 2017 CEV Cup
- All times are local

| Team 1 | Agg. | Team 2 | 1st leg | 2nd leg | Golden Set |
|---|---|---|---|---|---|
| Arm-1 Gentofte Volley (Denmark) | 0–6 | (Russia) Belogorie Belgorod | 0–3 | 0–3 | |
| Arm-2 Volley Amriswil (Switzerland) | 0–6 | (Italy) Sir Safety Perugia | 1–3 | 0–3 | |
| Arm-3 Crvena Zvezda Beograd (Serbia) | 0–6 | (Turkey) Arkas Izmir | 0–3 | 0–3 | |
| Arm-4 PAOK Thessaloniki (Greece) | 0–6 | (Poland) PGE Skra Bełchatów | 0–3 | 1–3 | |
| Arm-5 Hypo Tirol Innsbruck (Austria) | 1–5 | (Germany) VfB Friedrichshafen | 1–3 | 2–3 | |
| Arm-6 Abiant Lycurgus (Netherlands) | 0–6 | (Belgium) Noliko Maaseik | 0–3 | 0–3 | |
| Arm-7 ACH Volley Ljubljana (Slovenia) | 3–3 | (France) Arago de Sete | 3–1 | 1–3 | 15–9 |
| Arm-8 Tiikerit Kokkola (Finland) | 3–3 | (Czech Republic) Dukla Liberec | 3–0 | 0–3 | 11–15 |

=== First leg ===
| Date | Time | | Score | | Set 1 | Set 2 | Set 3 | Set 4 | Set 5 | Total | Report |
|---|---|---|---|---|---|---|---|---|---|---|---|
| 16 Nov | 18:30 | Gentofte Volley (Denmark) | 0–3 | (Russia) Belogorie Belgorod | 15–25 | 18–25 | 20–25 | | | 53–75 | Report |
| 16 Nov | 19:00 | Volley Amriswil (Switzerland) | 1–3 | (Italy) Sir Safety Perugia | 20–25 | 25–22 | 18–25 | 19–25 | | 82–97 | Report |
| 16 Nov | 18:00 | Crvena Zvezda Beograd (Serbia) | 0–3 | (Turkey) Arkas Izmir | 15–25 | 23–25 | 14–25 | | | 52–75 | Report |
| 16 Nov | 19:00 | PAOK Thessaloniki (Greece) | 0–3 | (Poland) PGE Skra Bełchatów | 22–25 | 17–25 | 20–25 | | | 59–75 | Report |
| 16 Nov | 19:00 | Hypo Tirol Innsbruck (Austria) | 1–3 | (Germany) VfB Friedrichshafen | 16–25 | 25–20 | 19–25 | 18–25 | | 78–95 | Report |
| 16 Nov | 19:00 | Abiant Lycurgus (Netherlands) | 0–3 | (Belgium) Noliko Maaseik | 17–25 | 20–25 | 25–27 | | | 62–77 | Report |
| 16 Nov | 18:30 | ACH Volley Ljubljana (Slovenia) | 3–1 | (France) Arago de Sete | 25–22 | 19–25 | 25–21 | 26–24 | | 95–92 | Report |
| 16 Nov | 18:30 | Tiikerit Kokkola (Finland) | 3–0 | (Czech Republic) Dukla Liberec | 25–23 | 25–14 | 25–21 | | | 75–58 | Report |

=== Second leg ===
| Date | Time | | Score | | Set 1 | Set 2 | Set 3 | Set 4 | Set 5 | Total | Report |
|---|---|---|---|---|---|---|---|---|---|---|---|
| 20 Nov | 18:00 | Belogorie Belgorod (Russia) | 3–0 | (Denmark) Gentofte Volley | 25–15 | 25–22 | 25–16 | | | 75–53 | Report |
| 20 Nov | 19:30 | Sir Safety Perugia (Italy) | 3–0 | (Switzerland) Volley Amriswil | 25–20 | 25–14 | 25–18 | | | 75–52 | Report |
| 20 Nov | 17:00 | Arkas Izmir (Turkey) | 3–0 | (Serbia) Crvena Zvezda Beograd | 25–21 | 25–22 | 25–21 | | | 75–64 | Report |
| 20 Nov | 20:00 | PGE Skra Bełchatów (Poland) | 3–1 | (Greece) PAOK Thessaloniki | 25–14 | 21–25 | 25–15 | 25–17 | | 96–71 | Report |
| 20 Nov | 18:00 | VfB Friedrichshafen (Germany) | 3–2 | (Austria) Hypo Tirol Innsbruck | 25–17 | 25–16 | 23–25 | 22–25 | 15–7 | 110–90 | Report |
| 20 Nov | 15:00 | Noliko Maaseik (Belgium) | 3–0 | (Netherlands) Abiant Lycurgus | 25–23 | 31–29 | 25–21 | | | 81–73 | Report |
| 20 Nov | 17:00 | Arago de Sete (France) | 3–1 | (Slovenia) ACH Volley Ljubljana | 22–25 | 25–23 | 25–22 | 25–23 | | 97–93 | Report |
| Golden set | | Arago de Sete (France) | 9–15 | (Slovenia) ACH Volley Ljubljana | | | | | | | |
| 20 Nov | 18:00 | Dukla Liberec (Czech Republic) | 3–0 | (Finland) Tiikerit Kokkola | 25–23 | 25–22 | 25–19 | | | 75–64 | Report |
| Golden set | | Dukla Liberec (Czech Republic) | 15–11 | (Finland) Tiikerit Kokkola | | | | | | | |

== League round ==
- Drawing of Pool was held on June 9, 2016

| Pool A | Pool B | Pool C | Pool D | Pool E |
|---|---|---|---|---|
| (Poland) ZAKSA Kędzierzyn-Koźle | (Germany) Berlin Recycling Volleys | (Russia) Zenit Kazan | (Italy) Modena Volley | (Turkey) Halkbank Ankara |
| (Russia) Dinamo Moscow | (Italy) Cucine Lube Civitanova | (France) Paris Volley | (Romania) SCM U Craiova | (Belgium) Knack Roeselare |
| (Turkey) İstanbul Büyükşehir Belediyesi | (Poland) Asseco Resovia Rzeszów | (Turkey) Arkas Izmir | (Poland) PGE Skra Bełchatów | (Russia) Belogorie Belgorod |
| (Belgium) Noliko Maaseik | (Czech Republic) Dukla Liberec | (Germany) VfB Friedrichshafen | (Slovenia) ACH Volley Ljubljana | (Italy) Sir Safety Perugia |
