= Quentin Jouffroy =

French volleyball player (born 1993)

Personal information
- Born: 5 July 1993 (age 33); Grenoble, France
- Height: 2.02 m (6 ft 8 in)
- Weight: 90 kg (198 lb)
- Spike: 345 cm (136 in)
- Block: 325 cm (128 in)

Volleyball information
- Position: Middle blocker
- Current club: Montpellier Volley

Career
Years	Teams
2012–2016; 2016–2018; 2018–2020; 2020–2021; 2021–2023; 2023–2024; 2024–2025; 2025–	ASUL Lyon VB; Tours VB; Montpellier Volley; GFC Ajaccio VB; Narbonne Volley; Plessis Robinson VB; Ślepsk Suwałki; Montpellier Volley

National team
France
Honours
Men's volleyball
Representing France
Olympic Games
Gold medal – first place	2024 Paris	Team
FIVB Nations League
Gold medal – first place	2022 Bologna
Gold medal – first place	2024 Łódź
Mediterranean Games
Bronze medal – third place	2013 Mersin

Quentin Jouffroy (born 5 July 1993) is a French professional volleyball player who plays as a middle blocker for Montpellier Volley and the France national team.

== Honours ==
=== Club ===
- CEV Cup
  - 2016–17 – with Tours VB
- CEV Challenge Cup
  - 2021–22 – with Narbonne Volley
- Domestic
  - 2017–18 French Championship, with Tours VB

=== Youth national team ===
- 2011 CEV U19 European Championship
