= Tommi Tiilikainen =

Finnish volleyball player and coach (born 1987)

Tommi Tiilikainen (born in 1987) is a Finnish volleyball coach and former volleyball player. Despite his young age, he is regarded by a number of players, coaches, and commentators as one of the greatest and most successful managers in Finnish volleyball. In 2016 Tiilikainen won his third Finnish volleyball league championships and led club Tiikerit to the third Finnish Cup gold.

In four years coaching the Tigers of Kokkola, he won Finnish volleyball league champion three times (2013, 2014, and 2016) and Finnish volleyball Cup three times. At the age of 25 Tiilikainen was the youngest coach ever to manage the Finnish volleyball league team. He was only 25 years old when he led Tigers to the Finnish championship, which made him the youngest coach ever in any Finnish national sports league history who has coached a club to the championship.

Tiilikainen started his coaching career in Kuortane sports training center at the age of 23. There he was the assistant coach for the Finnish boys' national team since 2010. After two years of coaching he made a contract with Kokkolan Tiikerit. The club had just remained its place in Finnish volleyball league in season 2011-12. In his first season in Kokkola, 2012–13, Tiilikainen led the club to a Finnish championship. The second season in Tiikerit brought Tiilikainen and the club a silver medal in Finnish league, and they won the Finnish Cup. In his third season in a row in Kokkola, Tiilikainen led Tiikerit to a double championship - Tiikerit won the Finnish league and Cup in season 2014-15. Season 2015-16 was a bullseye for Tiilikainen and Tiikerit. The club lost only one game in the season, winning 40 games out of 41. Tiikerit made a huge winning streak by winning 35 games in a row. They did not lose a singlene game in the playoffs in the 2014–15 and 2015-16 seasons.

After time spent in Kokkola and Tiikerit, Tiilikainen made a contract with SWD Düren. Düren plays in German Bundesliga.

At 2017/18season Tiilikainen move to the Toyoda Gosei Trefuerza as the first coach.

== Playing career ==
Tiilikainen was a talented volleyball player. His junior career was successful. Tiilikainen played on the Finnish boys' national team and was elected at the age of 19 to the Finnish men's volleyball team. Unfortunately at the same time a back injury interrupted his career. Doctors did not find any kind of conclusions to improve his back and Tiilikainen was forced to end his playing career in 2006. During his high school years, Tiilikainen studied and trained at the Finnish Volleyball Association training center in Kuortane.

After a few years of this, he tried to climb back to the top level of Finnish volleyball, but his back problems persisted. Tiilikainen played one season and ended his career finally in season 2010-11. He had already started coaching in Kuortane training center during his last season of his career.

== Achievements ==
- Finnish volleyball league champion 2013, 2015, 2016
- Finnish volleyball cup champion 2014, 2015, 2016
- Best coach in Finnish volleyball league 2013
- The youngest coach ever in Finnish sports history who has led a team to a Finnish championship
- The longest winning streak in Finnish volleyball league history, 35 wins in a row in Kokkolan Tiikerit 2015-2016
- All-time record at earned points in Finnish volleyball league during a season 2015-16
- All-time record without losing a single game in playoffs seasons 2014-15 and 2015-16

== Coaching career ==
- 2010-12 Finnish boys' national team
- 2012-16 Kokkolan Tiikerit (i.e. Tigers of Kokkola)
- 2016-17 SW Duren
- 2017-21 Toyoda Gosei Trefuerza
- 2021- Incheon Korean Air Jumbos
