= 2012 FIVB Volleyball World League qualification =

Sporting event

The 2012 FIVB Volleyball World League qualification was a qualification tournament to determine the final two spots for the 2012 World League. It was held from 29 July to 21 August 2011.

== Teams ==
Team	Qualified as
Second Round
Portugal	14th place* of the 2011 FIVB Volleyball World League
Puerto Rico	16th place of the 2011 FIVB Volleyball World League
First Round
Egypt	African Challenger (No. 13 in the World Ranking)
China	Asian Challenger** (No. 11 in the World Ranking)
Canada	American Challenger (No. 22 in the World Ranking)
Slovakia	European Challenger (No. 33 in the World Ranking)

* Because of 15th place Japan to play all its 2011 World League matches abroad due to the nuclear and radiation concerns in Japan, FIVB decided to guarantee Japan a vacancy in the 2012 edition.
** China beat Iran 3–1 (25–22, 22–25, 25–18, 25–19) in the Asian Qualifier in Taicang, China on 11 July 2011.

== Pool standing procedure ==
1. Match points
2. Number of matches won
3. Sets ratio
4. Points ratio
5. Result of the last match between the tied teams

Match won 3–0 or 3–1: 3 match points for the winner, 0 match points for the loser
Match won 3–2: 2 match points for the winner, 1 match point for the loser

== First round ==
- All times are local.

=== Playoff 1 ===
Pos	Team	Pld	W	L	Pts	SW	SL	SR	SPW	SPL	SPR
1	Canada	2	1	1	3	4	3	1.333	175	160	1.094
2	Slovakia	2	1	1	3	3	4	0.750	160	175	0.914

Date	Time		Score		Set 1	Set 2	Set 3	Set 4	Set 5	Total	Report
29 Jul	19:30	Canada	1–3	Slovakia	26–28	25–22	23–25	23–25		97–100	P2 P3
30 Jul	19:30	Canada	3–0	Slovakia	28–26	25–17	25–17			78–60	P2 P3

=== Playoff 2 ===
Pos	Team	Pld	W	L	Pts	SW	SL	SR	SPW	SPL	SPR
1	China	2	2	0	5	6	2	3.000	189	177	1.068
2	Egypt	2	0	2	1	2	6	0.333	177	189	0.937

Date	Time		Score		Set 1	Set 2	Set 3	Set 4	Set 5	Total	Report
30 Jul	14:03	China	3–0	Egypt	29–27	25–22	25–22			79–71	P2 P3
31 Jul	14:05	China	3–2	Egypt	22–25	25–20	25–21	21–25	17–15	110–106	P2 P3

== Second round ==
- All times are local.

=== Playoff 1 ===
Pos	Team	Pld	W	L	Pts	SW	SL	SR	SPW	SPL	SPR
1	Canada	2	2	0	6	6	1	6.000	168	139	1.209
2	Puerto Rico	2	0	2	0	1	6	0.167	139	168	0.827

Date	Time		Score		Set 1	Set 2	Set 3	Set 4	Set 5	Total	Report
20 Aug	19:00	Canada	3–1	Puerto Rico	25–17	25–22	18–25	25–23		93–87	P2 P3
21 Aug	19:00	Canada	3–0	Puerto Rico	25–19	25–14	25–19			75–52	P2 P3

=== Playoff 2 ===
Pos	Team	Pld	W	L	Pts	SW	SL	SR	SPW	SPL	SPR
1	Portugal	2	1	1	4	5	4	1.250	203	193	1.052
2	China	2	1	1	2	4	5	0.800	193	203	0.951

Date	Time		Score		Set 1	Set 2	Set 3	Set 4	Set 5	Total	Report
13 Aug	14:00	China	1–3	Portugal	25–20	21–25	14–25	23–25		83–95	P2 P3
14 Aug	14:00	China	3–2	Portugal	24–26	25–23	25–21	21–25	15–13	110–108	P2 P3
