= David Konečný =

Czech volleyball player (born 1982)

David Konecny
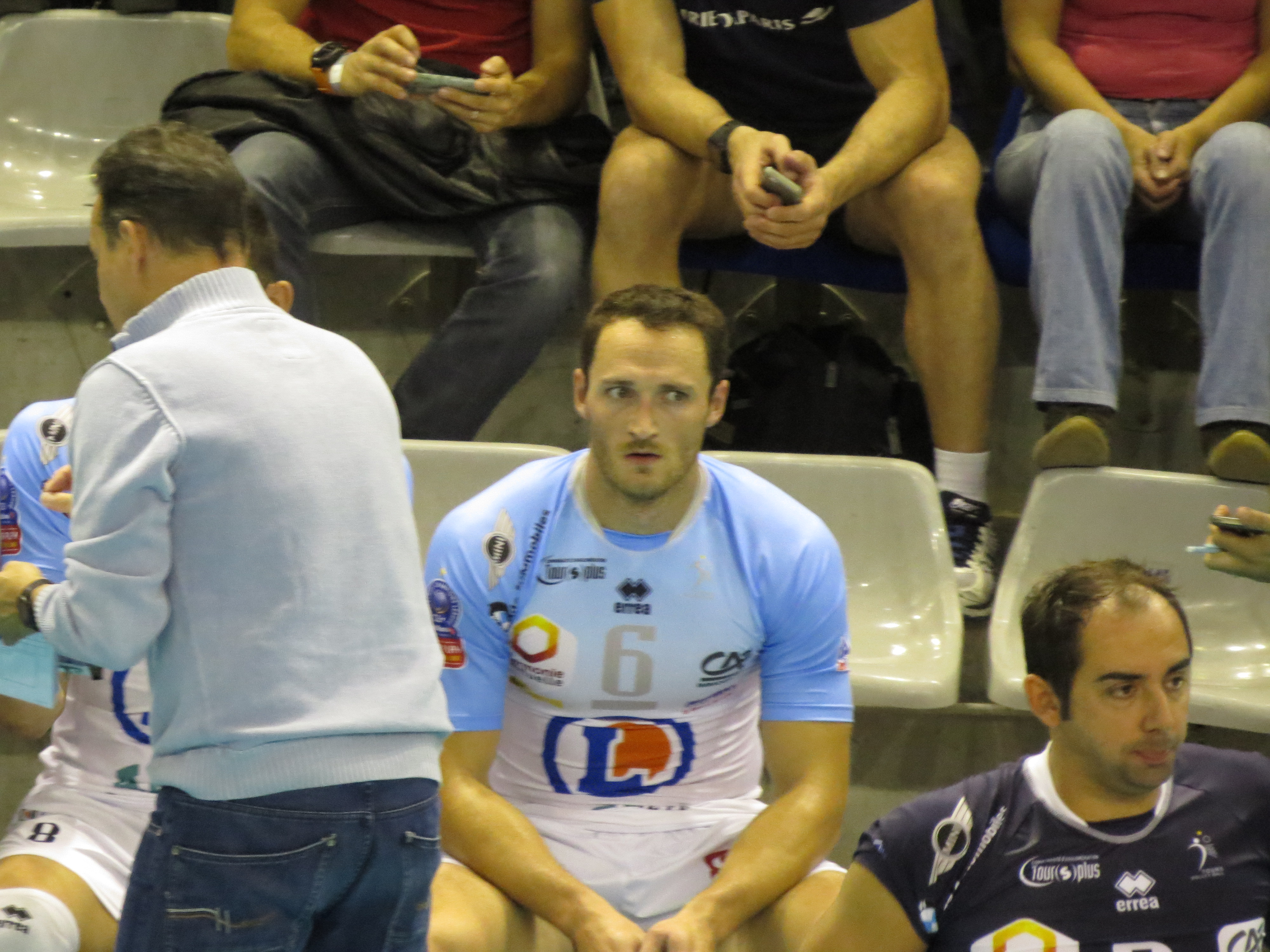
- French Volleyball Super Cup 2014

Personal information
- Nationality: Czech
- Born: 10 October 1982 (age 44)
- Height: 193 m (633 ft 2 in)
- Weight: 95 kg (209 lb)
- Spike: 351 cm (138 in)
- Block: 330 cm (130 in)

Volleyball information
- Number: 17

Career
Years	Teams
2010-2017	Tours VB

National team
2010	Czech Republic

David Konecny (born 10 October 1982) is a Czech retired volleyball player. He was part of the Czech Republic men's national volleyball team at the 2010 FIVB Volleyball Men's World Championship in Italy. He played for Tours VB.

== Clubs ==
- Tours VB (2010–2017)
