= Michaël Parkinson =

Dutch volleyball player (born 1991)

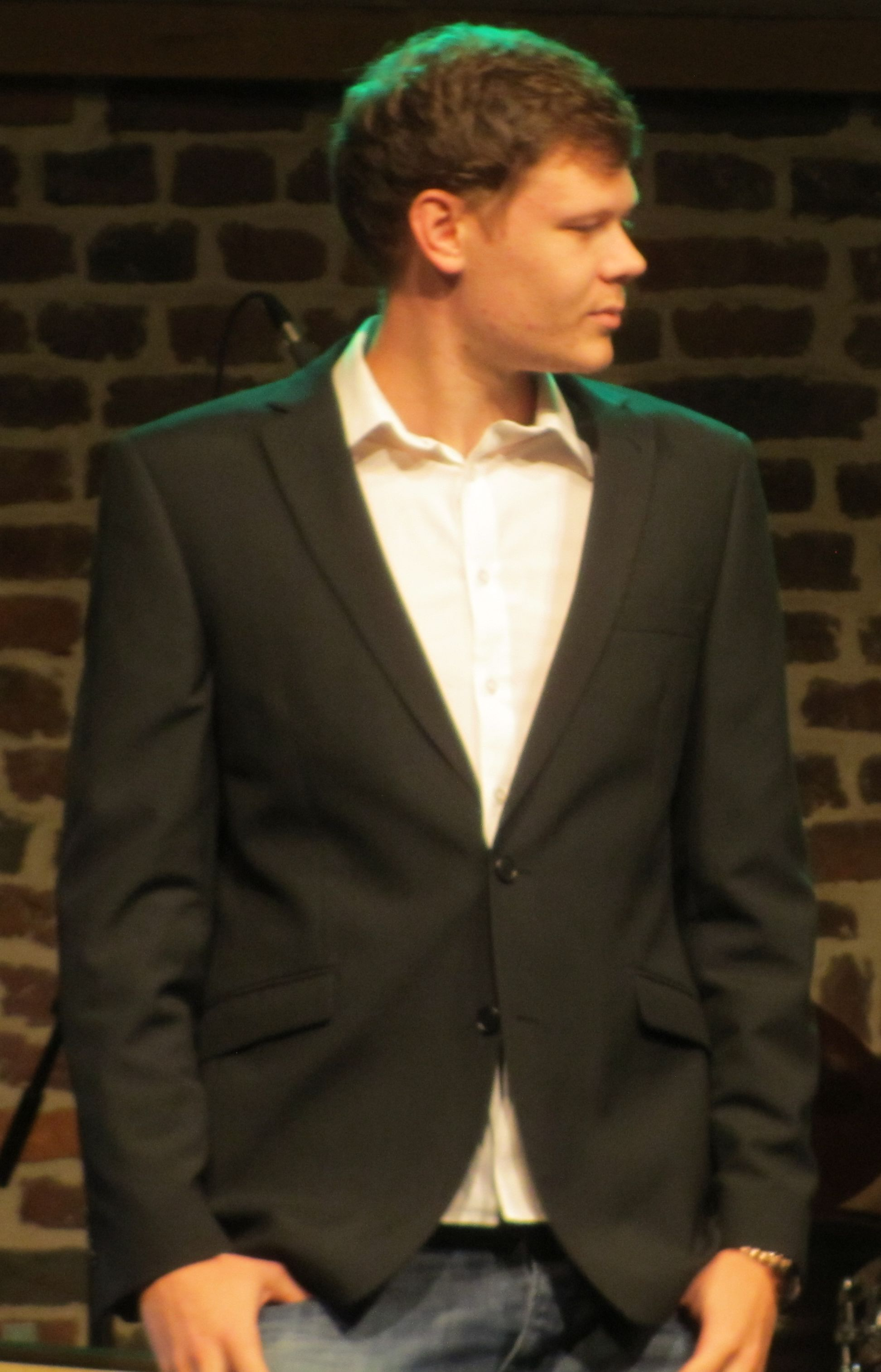

Personal information
- Born: 23 November 1991 (age 34); Reading, England
- Height: 2.03 m (6 ft 8 in)
- Weight: 102 kg (225 lb)
- Spike: 365 cm (144 in)
- Block: 350 cm (138 in)

Volleyball information
- Position: Middle blocker
- Current club: Tours VB
- Number: 22

Career
Years	Teams
2011–2015; 2015–2016; 2016–2017; 2017–2018; 2018–2019; 2019–2020; 2020–2021; 2021–2022; 2022–	Noliko Maaseik; SWD Powervolleys Düren; Lindemans Aalst; Nantes Rezé Métropole; Steaua București; Stade Poitevin Poitiers; Spacer's de Toulouse; Czarni Radom; Tours VB

National team
2013–	Netherlands
Honours
Men's volleyball
Representing Netherlands
European League
Bronze medal – third place	2019 Estonia

Michaël Parkinson (born 23 November 1991) is a Dutch professional volleyball player who plays as a middle blocker for Tours VB and the Netherlands national team.

== Honours ==
=== Club ===
- Domestic
  - 2010–11 Dutch Championship, with Rivium Rotterdam
  - 2011–12 Belgian SuperCup, with Noliko Maaseik
  - 2011–12 Belgian Cup, with Noliko Maaseik
  - 2011–12 Belgian Championship, with Noliko Maaseik
  - 2012–13 Belgian SuperCup, with Noliko Maaseik
  - 2019–20 French Cup, with Stade Poitevin Poitiers
  - 2022–23 French Cup, with Tours VB
  - 2022–23 French Championship, with Tours VB
