= Mostafa Heydari =

Iranian volleyball player (born 1991)

Personal information
- Nationality: (Iran) Iranian
- Born: 14 December 1991 (age 34); Tehran, Iran
- Height: 178 m (584 ft 0 in)
- Weight: 75 kg (165 lb)
- Spike: 263
- Block: 258

Volleyball information
- Position: Libero
- Current club: Mes Rafsanjan
- Number: 16

Career
Years	Teams
2018–2019	Sirjan Foolad

National team
2018–	Iran
Honours
Men's volleyball
Representing Iran
AVC Asian Championship
Gold medal – first place	2019 Iran
Gold medal – first place	2021 Japan

Mostafa Heydari (Persian: مصطفی حیدری; born 14 December 1991) is an Iranian professional volleyball player. He is part of the Iranian national team, and a two–time Asian Champion (2019, 2021). At the professional club level, he plays for Mes Rafsanjan.

== Honours ==
=== National team ===
- Grand Champions Cup
  - 2017
- Asian Games
  - 2016
- Military World Games
  - 2014

=== Clubs ===
- National championships
  - 2020/2021 2021 FIVB Volleyball Men's Club World Championship squads

=== Individual awards ===
- 2014: AVC U18 Asian Championship – Best outside spiker
- 2016: AVC U20 Asian Championship – Best outside spiker
- 2017: FIVB U19 World Championship – Most valuable player
- 2017: FIVB U19 World Championship – Best outside spiker
- 2018: AVC U20 Asian Championship – Most valuable player
- 2019: FIVB U21 World Championship – Most valuable player
