= Philipp Collin =

German volleyball player (born 1990)

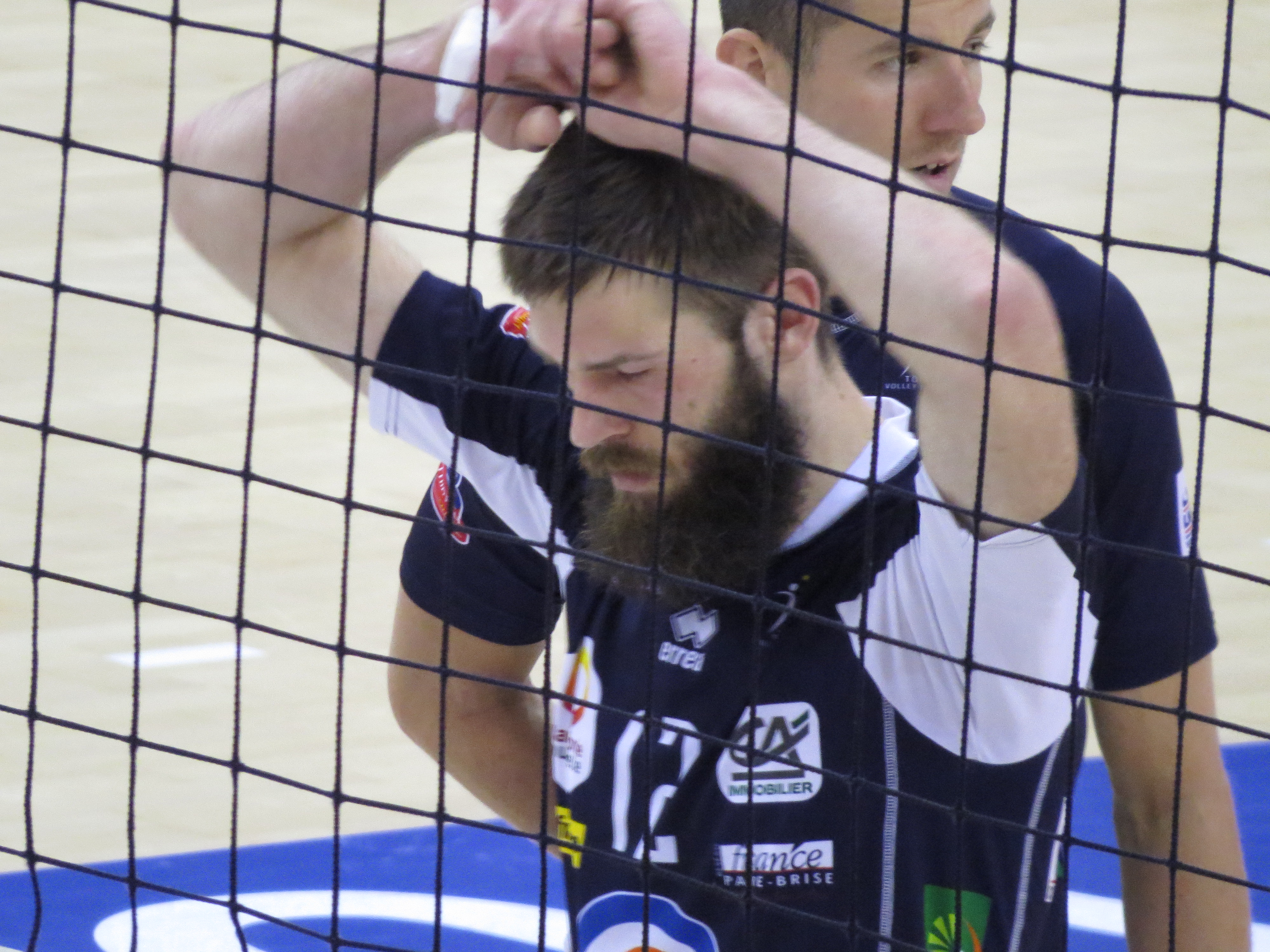

Personal information
- Nationality: German
- Born: 28 October 1990 (age 36)
- Height: 204 cm (6 ft 8 in)
- Weight: 98 kg (216 lb)
- Spike: 342 cm (135 in)
- Block: 335 cm (132 in)

Volleyball information
- Current club: Vfb Friedrichshafen
- Number: 20 (national team)

Career
Years	Teams
2014	Tours VB

National team
2013-2014	Germany

Philipp Collin (born 28 October 1990) is a former German male volleyball player. He is part of the Germany men's national volleyball team. On club level he plays for VFB Friedrichshafen.
