= 2010 FIVB Volleyball Men's Club World Championship =

Volleyball tournament edition

2010 Men's Club World Championship

Tournament details
- Host country: Qatar
- Dates: 15–21 December
- Teams: 8 (from 5 confederations)
- Venue: 1 (in 1 host city)

Final positions
- Champions: (Italy) Trentino BetClic (2nd title)

Tournament awards
- MVP: (Cuba) Osmany Juantorena (TRE)

The 2010 FIVB Volleyball Men's Club World Championship was the 6th edition of the event. It was held in Doha, Qatar from 15 to 21 December 2010.

== Qualification ==
Team (Confederation)	Qualified as
(Qatar) Al-Arabi (AVC)	Hosts
(Egypt) Al-Ahly (CAVB)	2010 African Champions
(Iran) Paykan Tehran (AVC)	2010 Asian Champions
(Italy) Trentino BetClic (CEV)	2010 European Champions
(United States) Paul Mitchell (NORCECA)	2010 NORCECA Representatives
(Argentina) Drean Bolívar (CSV)	2010 South American Champions
(Russia) Dynamo Moscow (CEV)	Wild Card (2010 European Runners-up)
(Poland) PGE Skra Bełchatów (CEV)	Wild Card (2010 European 3rd place)

== Pools composition ==
Pool A	Pool B
(Poland) PGE Skra Bełchatów	(Italy) Trentino BetClic
(Egypt) Al-Ahly	(Russia) Dynamo Moscow
(Iran) Paykan Tehran	(United States) Paul Mitchell
(Qatar) Al-Arabi	(Argentina) Drean Bolívar

== Venue ==
All matches
Doha, Qatar
Al-Gharafa Indoor Hall
Capacity: 3,000

== Preliminary round ==
- All times are Arabia Standard Time (UTC+03:00).

=== Pool A ===
Pos	Team	Pld	W	L	Pts	SW	SL	SR	SPW	SPL	SPR	Qualification
1	(Poland) PGE Skra Bełchatów	3	3	0	6	9	2	4.500	259	210	1.233	Semifinals
2	(Iran) Paykan Tehran	3	2	1	5	8	4	2.000	281	247	1.138	Semifinals
3	(Qatar) Al-Arabi	3	1	2	4	4	7	0.571	239	256	0.934	
4	(Egypt) Al-Ahly	3	0	3	3	1	9	0.111	184	250	0.736	

Date	Time		Score		Set 1	Set 2	Set 3	Set 4	Set 5	Total	Report
15 Dec	19:00	Al-Ahly (Egypt)	1–3	(Qatar) Al-Arabi	17–25	27–25	17–25	20–25		81–100	P2 P3
16 Dec	12:00	PGE Skra Bełchatów (Poland)	3–2	(Iran) Paykan Tehran	24–26	25–21	25–22	20–25	15–12	109–106	P2 P3
17 Dec	10:00	Al-Ahly (Egypt)	0–3	(Iran) Paykan Tehran	20–25	19–25	19–25			58–75	P2 P3
17 Dec	19:00	PGE Skra Bełchatów (Poland)	3–0	(Qatar) Al-Arabi	25–22	25–22	25–15			75–59	P2 P3
19 Dec	12:00	PGE Skra Bełchatów (Poland)	3–0	(Egypt) Al-Ahly	25–13	25–10	25–22			75–45	P2 P3
19 Dec	19:00	Paykan Tehran (Iran)	3–1	(Qatar) Al-Arabi	25–15	25–22	25–27	25–16		100–80	P2 P3

=== Pool B ===
Pos	Team	Pld	W	L	Pts	SW	SL	SR	SPW	SPL	SPR	Qualification
1	(Italy) Trentino BetClic	3	3	0	6	9	1	9.000	250	208	1.202	Semifinals
2	(Argentina) Drean Bolívar	3	2	1	5	7	5	1.400	274	276	0.993	Semifinals
3	(Russia) Dynamo Moscow	3	1	2	4	4	6	0.667	232	226	1.027	
4	(United States) Paul Mitchell	3	0	3	3	1	9	0.111	204	250	0.816	

Date	Time		Score		Set 1	Set 2	Set 3	Set 4	Set 5	Total	Report
15 Dec	12:00	Paul Mitchell (United States)	1–3	(Argentina) Drean Bolívar	25–23	25–27	19–25	21–25		90–100	P2 P3
16 Dec	17:10	Trentino BetClic (Italy)	3–0	(Russia) Dynamo Moscow	25–21	25–23	27–25			77–69	P2 P3
17 Dec	12:00	Dynamo Moscow (Russia)	3–0	(United States) Paul Mitchell	25–16	25–14	25–23			75–53	P2 P3
17 Dec	15:00	Trentino BetClic (Italy)	3–1	(Argentina) Drean Bolívar	25–16	25–15	23–25	25–22		98–78	P2 P3
19 Dec	15:00	Dynamo Moscow (Russia)	1–3	(Argentina) Drean Bolívar	22–25	22–25	25–21	19–25		88–96	P2 P3
19 Dec	17:05	Trentino BetClic (Italy)	3–0	(United States) Paul Mitchell	25–22	25–19	25–20			75–61	P2 P3

== Final round ==
- All times are Arabia Standard Time (UTC+03:00).

Semifinals
20 December
(Poland) Bełchatów	3
(Argentina) Bolívar	0
20 December
(Italy) Trentino	3
(Iran) Paykan	0

Final
21 December
(Poland) Bełchatów	1
(Italy) Trentino	3
3rd place match
21 December
(Argentina) Bolívar	2
(Iran) Paykan	3

=== Semifinals ===
Date	Time		Score		Set 1	Set 2	Set 3	Set 4	Set 5	Total	Report
20 Dec	12:00	PGE Skra Bełchatów (Poland)	3–0	(Argentina) Drean Bolívar	27–25	25–18	25–15			77–58	P2 P3
20 Dec	19:00	Trentino BetClic (Italy)	3–0	(Iran) Paykan Tehran	25–23	25–19	25–17			75–59	P2 P3

=== 3rd place match ===
Date	Time		Score		Set 1	Set 2	Set 3	Set 4	Set 5	Total	Report
21 Dec	12:00	Drean Bolívar (Argentina)	2–3	(Iran) Paykan Tehran	25–23	25–23	23–25	20–25	13–15	106–111	P2 P3

=== Final ===
Date	Time		Score		Set 1	Set 2	Set 3	Set 4	Set 5	Total	Report
21 Dec	17:00	PGE Skra Bełchatów (Poland)	1–3	(Italy) Trentino BetClic	22–25	19–25	25–20	16–25		82–95	P2 P3

== Final standing ==
Rank	Team
1st place, gold medalist(s)	(Italy) Trentino BetClic
2nd place, silver medalist(s)	(Poland) PGE Skra Bełchatów
3rd place, bronze medalist(s)	(Iran) Paykan Tehran
4	(Argentina) Drean Bolívar
5	(Egypt) Al-Ahly
5	(Qatar) Al-Arabi
5	(Russia) Dynamo Moscow
5	(United States) Paul Mitchell

2010 Men's Club World Champions

2nd title

14–man Roster
Matey Kaziyski (c), Nicola Leonardi, Emanuele Birarelli, Dore Della Lunga, Osmany Juantorena, Łukasz Żygadło, Raphael Oliveira, Andrea Sala, Valentin Bratoev, Tsvetan Sokolov, Jan Štokr, Riad Ribeiro, Andrea Bari, Massimo Colaci
Head coach
Radostin Stoychev

== Awards ==
- Most valuable player
  (Cuba) Osmany Juantorena (Trentino BetClic)
- Best scorer
  (Argentina) Federico Pereyra (Drean Bolívar)
- Best spiker
  (Cuba) Osmany Juantorena (Trentino BetClic)
- Best blocker
  (Iran) Mohammad Mousavi (Paykan Tehran)
- Best server
  (Argentina) Luciano De Cecco (Drean Bolívar)
- Best setter
  (Brazil) Raphael Oliveira (Trentino BetClic)
- Best libero
  (Poland) Paweł Zatorski (PGE Skra Bełchatów)
