= Marcelo Fronckowiak =

Brazilian volleyball player and coach (born 1968)

Personal information
- Full name: Marcelo Ricardo Fronckowiak
- Born: 14 March 1968 (age 58); Porto Alegre, Brazil

Coaching information
- Current team: Brazil; Steaua București
Previous teams coached
Years	Teams
2002–2004; 2004–2009; 2009–2012; 2012–2014; 2014; 2015–2017; 2017–2020; 2018; 2018–2021; 2021–2025; 2022; 2025– 2025–	Sport Club Ulbra; Tourcoing LM; Minas Tênis Clube; Associação Desportiva RJX; Dynamo Krasnodar; Vôlei Canoas; Brazil (AC); Volley Callipo; Cuprum Lubin; Tours VB; Slovenia (AC); Brazil (AC); Steaua București

Career
Years	Teams
1984–1986; 1986–1991; 1991–1992; 1993–1996; 1996–1999	UCS Sogipa; Associação Atlética Frangosul; Clube Atlético Pirelli; Frangosul/Ginástica; Canoas Sport Club

Marcelo Ricardo Fronckowiak (born 14 March 1968) is a Brazilian professional volleyball coach and former player. He serves as head coach for Steaua București and an assistant coach for the Brazil national team.

== Career ==
=== As a player ===
During his career, he won 3 Brazilian Champion titles in 1995, 1998 and 1999.

=== As a coach ===
Fronckowiak began his coaching career in 2002, leading Sport Club Ulbra to the Brazilian Champion title next year and the 2nd place in 2004.

During his work in France with Tourcoing LM, he won the CEV Challenge Cup bronze medal, and ended the 2008–09 season in 2nd place, losing the final matches to Paris Volley.

He came back to his native country in 2009 as a head coach of Minas Tênis Clube, and won a bronze medal in 2012. After joining Associação Desportiva RJX in 2012, he once again in his career won the Brazilian Champion title. In 2017, he became an assistant of Renan Dal Zotto in the Brazil national team, just before being dismissed from Vôlei Canoas, probably due to reduced budget for a new season.

For the 2018–19 season, he signed a contract with Cuprum Lubin in the Polish PlusLiga.

He served as head coach for Tours VB between 2021 and 2025.

== Personal life ==
Fronckowiak is of Polish descent.

== Honours ==
=== As a player ===
- CSV South American Club Championship
  - Ribeirão Preto 1991 – with Associação Atlética Frangosul
  - São Paulo 1992 – with Clube Atlético Pirelli
- Domestic
  - 1994–95 Brazilian Championship, with Frangosul/Ginástica
  - 1997–98 Brazilian Championship, with Canoas Sport Club
  - 1998–99 Brazilian Championship, with Canoas Sport Club

=== As a coach ===
- CEV Cup
  - 2021–22 – with Tours VB
- Domestic
  - 2002–03 Brazilian Championship, with Canoas Sport Club
  - 2012–13 Brazilian Championship, with Associação Desportiva RJX
  - 2022–23 French Cup, with Tours VB
  - 2022–23 French Championship, with Tours VB
