= Associação Desportiva RJX =

Brazilian volleyball team

- Short name: RJX
- Founded: 2011
- Dissolved: 2014
- Ground: Ginásio do Maracanãzinho, Rio de Janeiro
- Chairman: (Brazil) Eike Batista
- Manager: (Brazil) Marcelo Fronckowiak
- League: Brazilian Superliga
- 2013–14: 5th
- Website: Club home page

Uniforms
Home	Away

The Associação Desportiva RJX and thereafter RJ Vôlei was a Brazilian volleyball team based in Rio de Janeiro, Rio de Janeiro state. They compete in the Brazilian Superliga and were the 2012–13 national league champions.

== History ==
The team was founded in 2011 with sponsorship and support of EBX Group controlled by business magnate Eike Batista in partnership with the Government of the State of Rio de Janeiro, marking the return of a men's volleyball team in the Rio city. In 2013 following the loss of the main sponsor, the club changed its name to RJ Vôlei. After finishing fifth in the 2013–14 Brazilian Superliga the team withdrew from the following season due to financial troubles.

== Current squad ==
Squad as of October 21, 2012

Number	Player	Position	Height (m)
1	(Brazil) Bruno Rezende	Setter	1.90
3	(Brazil) Bernardo Roese	Setter	1.85
4	(Brazil) Thiago Sens	Outside hitter	1.97
5	(Brazil) Paulo da Silva	Opposite	1.97
6	(Brazil) Rafael Koettker	Libero	1.84
7	(Brazil) Manius Abbadi	Outside hitter	2.02
9	(Brazil) Théo Lopes	Opposite	2.00
11	(Brazil) Thiago Soares Alves	Outside hitter	1.95
12	(Brazil) Guilherme Santos	Setter	1.95
13	(Brazil) Renan da Purificação	Outside hitter	1.96
14	(Brazil) Ualas Conceição	Middle blocker	2.04
15	(Brazil) Riad Ribeiro	Middle blocker	2.05
16	(Brazil) Lucas Saatkamp	Middle blocker	2.10
17	(Brazil) Athos Costa	Middle blocker	2.03
18	(Brazil) Dante Amaral	Outside hitter	2.01
19	(Brazil) Mário Júnior	Libero	1.91

- Head coach: (Brazil) Marcelo Fronckowiak
- Assistant coach: (Brazil) Leonardo de Carvalho

== Honors ==
- Brazilian Superliga

Winners (1): 2012–13

- Campeonato Carioca

Winners (2): 2011, 2012
