= Athos Costa =

Brazilian volleyball player (born 1988)

Personal information
- Full name: Athos Ferreira da Costa
- Born: November 29, 1988 (age 37); Brazil
- Height: 2.03 m (6 ft 8 in)
- Weight: 88 kg (194 lb)

Volleyball information
- Position: Middle Blocker
- Current club: (Portugal) Sporting CP
- Number: 14

Career
Years	Teams
2007/08; 2008/09; 2009/10; 2010/11; 2011/12; 2012/13; 2013/14; 2014/15; 2015/16; 2016/17; 2017/18; 2018/19; 2019-	(Brazil) EC Pinheiros (Brazil) CN Araraquara (Brazil) SV Santo André (Brazil) APAN Vôlei / Blumenau (Brazil) Vôlei Futuro (Brazil) RJX Rio de Janeiro (Brazil) América Vôlei (Brazil) Bento Vôlei (Brazil) São José Vôlei (Greece) Olympiacos SFP (Italy) New Mater Volley (Brazil) Funvic Taubaté (Portugal) Sporting CP

Athos Costa (born November 29, 1988) is a Brazilian volleyball player who plays for Sporting CP.
