= Thiago Sens =

Brazilian volleyball player (born 1985)

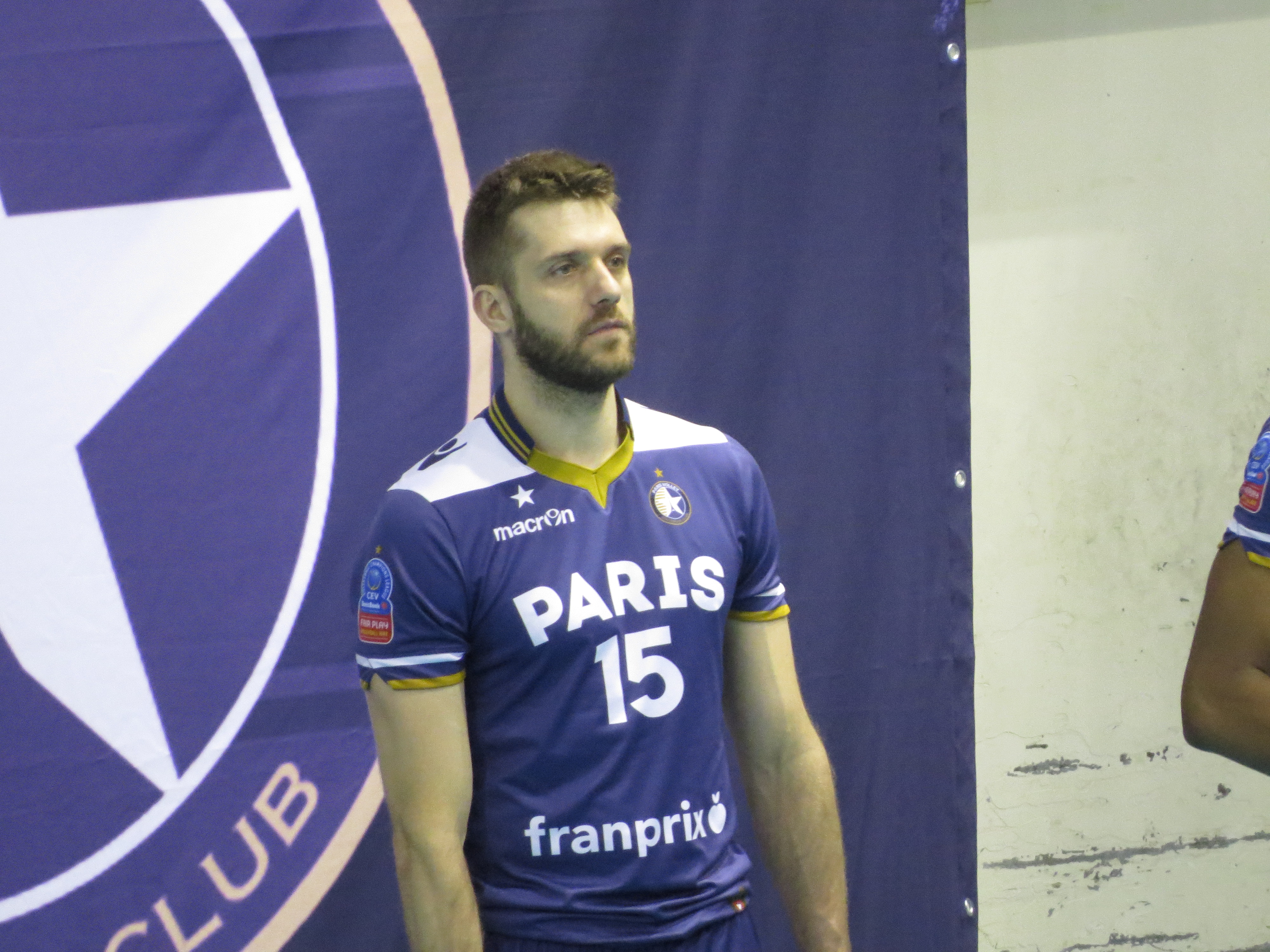

Personal information
- Full name: Thiago Henrique Sens
- Born: July 2, 1985 (age 41) Blumenau, Brazil
- Height: 1.98 m (6 ft 6 in)
- Weight: 90 kg (200 lb)

Volleyball information
- Position: Outside hitter
- Current club: Sporting CP
- Number: 4

Career
- Years: Team
- 1997-2003 2003-2007 2007-2009 2009-2011 2011-2013 2013-2014 2014-2015 2015-2016 2016 2016-2017 2017-2019 2019-: (Brazil) Barão/Blumenau (Brazil) Unisul (Brazil) São Bernardo (Brazil) Brasil Vôlei Clube (Brazil) RJX (United Arab Emirates) Al Jazira (Brazil) Funvic/Taubaté (Brazil) Maringá Vôlei (Italy) Pallavolo Modena (France) Paris Volley (France) Montpellier UC (Portugal) Sporting CP

Thiago Henrique Sens (born July 2, 1985) is a Brazilian volleyball player who plays for Sporting CP.

== Honours ==
- Brazilian Men's Volleyball Superliga: 2003-04 and 2012-13
