= Riad Ribeiro =

Brazilian volleyball player (born 1981)

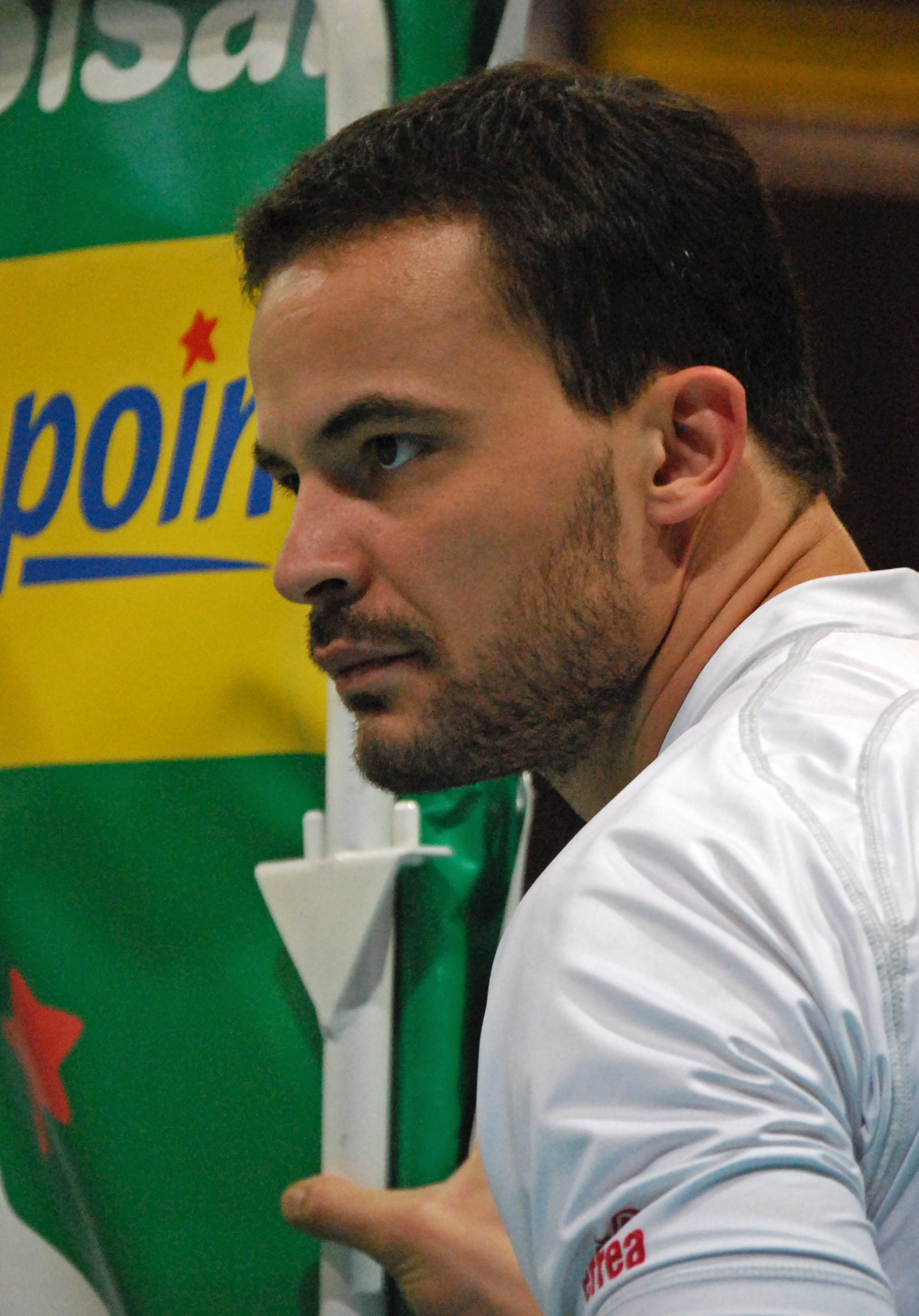
- Riad in 2011

Personal information
- Full name: Riad Garcia Pires Ribeiro
- Born: 2 October 1981 (age 45); Rio de Janeiro, Brazil
- Height: 204 cm (6 ft 8 in)
- Weight: 100 kg (220 lb)
- Spike: 345 cm (136 in)
- Block: 325 cm (128 in)

Volleyball information
- Position: Middle blocker

Career
Years	Teams
2006–2007	Piemonte Volley
2007–2008	Top Volley Latina
2008–2011	Trentino BetClic
2011–2014	RJX Rio de Janeiro
2014–2015	SESI São Paulo
2015–2016	Funvic Taubaté
2015–2016	SESI São Paulo
2016–2017	Corinthias-Guarulhos
2019–	Botafogo

National team
2007, 2015	Brazil

Riad Garcia Pires Ribeiro (born 2 October 1981) is a Brazilian male volleyball player. He is part of the Brazil men's national volleyball team. With his club Trentino BetClic he won the 2010 FIVB Volleyball Men's Club World Championship. On club level he plays now for SESI.
