= Felipe Brito =

Chilean footballer (born 1996)

Personal information
- Full name: Felipe Andrés Brito Aguilera
- Date of birth: 25 August 1996 (age 30)
- Place of birth: Chile
- Height: 1.79 m (5 ft 10 1/2 in)
- Position: Forward

Youth career
- Audax Italiano
- 2012–2015: Universidad de Chile

Senior career*
Years	Team	Apps	(Gls)
2015–2018	Universidad de Chile		
2016–2017	→ San Marcos (loan)	8	(0)
2017–2018	→ Deportes La Serena (loan)	4	(0)
2019	Deportes Vallenar	4	(0)
2021	Trasandino		
2022	Odžak 102		
2023	Luis Ángel Firpo	15	(0)
2025	Imperial Unido	–	(–)
- * Club domestic league appearances and goals as of 25 January 2026

Felipe Andrés Brito Aguilera (born 25 August 1996) is a Chilean footballer who plays as a forward.

== Club career ==
As a youth player, Brito was with Audax Italiano before joining the Universidad de Chile youth system in October 2012. As a member of Universidad de Chile, he played on loan at San Marcos de Arica and Deportes La Serena.

After stints with Deportes Vallenar and Trasandino in his homeland, he moved abroad and joined the Bosnian side Odžak 102 in 2022.

In 2023, Brito signed with Luis Ángel Firpo in the Primera División de El Salvador.

In 2025, Brito joined Imperial Unido.
