= Kokkolan Tiikerit =

Finnish volleyball club

Kokkolan Tiikerit (Finnish for Tigers of Kokkola) is a Finnish volleyball team in the 'Mestaruusliiga' (Finnish volleyball league). The team's hometown is Kokkola, Finland. Tiikerit were the Finnish champions in 2013, 2015 and 2016 and in addition, won the Finnish Cup in 2014, 2015, and 2016.

== History ==
Kokkolan Tiikerit was founded in 1974. The club was relegated to the first division in 1981. In the 2000s Tiikerit started challenging for promotion back to the top level of Finnish volleyball. They climbed back to the Finnish volleyball league in 2011 by winning the first division league in 2011 and the championship's qualification game series against Joensuun Riento. Ever since, Tiikerit has been improving. In 2013, the club won the Finnish Cup and won the gold medal in the Finnish volleyball championships. At the time, the club's head coach Tommi Tiilikainen was only 25 years old which made him the youngest coach ever to win any Finnish league.

In 2014, Tiikerit won the Finnish cup and placed second in the Finnish volleyball championships. In 2015, Tiikerit won both the Finnish Cup and the Finnish championships. They repeated this achievement in 2016. Simultaneously, the club won a record 36 games in a row in the Finnish volleyball league. They also reached 85 points in the regular season, which is an all-time record in the history of the Finnish Volleyball league.

== Honours ==
- Finnish volleyball league champions 2013, 2015, 2016
- Finnish Cup 2013, 2014, 2015
- Champions of the First League (second highest league in Finland) 2011
