= Tours VB =

French volleyball club

- Full name: Tours Volley-Ball
- Founded: 1966
- Ground: Salle Robert Grenon (Capacity: 3,300)
- Chairman: Bruno Poilpré
- Manager: Marcelo Fronckowiak
- Captain: Željko Ćorić
- League: Ligue A
- 2023–24: 2nd place
- Website: Club home page

Uniforms
| Home | Away |

Tours VB is a professional men's volleyball club which is playing their home matches at the Salle Robert Grenon in Tours, France.

Tours VB plays in LNV Ligue A, top volleyball league in France. According to Media Guide book, the annual budget of Tours is € 2,500,000 for Season 2021/2022 which is the highest budget of all teams.

== Honours ==
=== Domestic ===
- French Championship

Winners (9): 2003–04, 2009–10, 2011–12, 2012–13, 2013–14, 2014–15, 2017–18, 2018–19, 2022–23

- French Cup

Winners (11): 2002–03, 2004–05, 2005–06, 2008–09, 2009–10, 2010–11, 2012–13, 2013–14, 2014–15, 2018–19, 2022–23

- French SuperCup

Winners (5): 2005–06, 2012–13, 2014–15, 2015–16, 2022–23

=== International ===
- CEV Champions League

Winners (1): 2004–05
Silver (1): 2006–07
Final Four (1): 2003–04

- CEV Cup

Winners (1): 2016–17
Silver (1): 2021–22

== Team ==
As of 2022–23 season

| No. | Name | Date of birth | Position |
|---|---|---|---|
| 1 | (Brazil) João Rafael Ferreira | 17 March 1993 (age 32) | outside hitter |
| 2 | (France) Pierre Derouillon | 6 June 1999 (age 26) | outside hitter |
| 5 | (Brazil) Leandro dos Santos | 13 January 1993 (age 32) | middle blocker |
| 6 | (France) Aymeric Pelvet | 24 January 2001 (age 24) | outside hitter |
| 7 | (Argentina) Luciano Palonsky | 8 July 1999 (age 26) | outside hitter |
| 8 | (France) Gary Chauvin | 29 December 1987 (age 38) | setter |
| 9 | (France) Thiébault Bruckert | 16 April 1991 (age 34) | middle blocker |
| 10 | (Brazil) Aboubacar Dramé Neto | 16 February 1994 (age 31) | opposite |
| 12 | (Ukraine) Dmytro Teryomenko | 1 February 1987 (age 38) | middle blocker |
| 14 | (France) Benjamin Diez | 4 April 1998 (age 27) | libero |
| 17 | (Bosnia and Herzegovina) Željko Ćorić | 24 August 1988 (age 37) | setter |
| 19 | (Brazil) José Ademar Santana | 6 February 1996 (age 29) | outside hitter |
| 20 | (Czech Republic) Jakub Klajmon | 20 February 2003 (age 22) | middle blocker |
| 22 | (Netherlands) Michaël Parkinson | 23 November 1991 (age 34) | middle blocker |
| Head coach: | | (Brazil) Marcelo Fronckowiak | |
