= 2021–22 SuperLega =

Italian volleyball competition

- Association: Federazione Italiana Pallavolo
- League: Italian Volleyball League
- Sport: Men's volleyball
- Duration: 9 October 2021 – 13 May 2022
- Games: 197
- Teams: 13
- TV partner(s): Rai Sport; Volleyball World TV

Regular season
- Top seed: Sir Safety Conad Perugia
- Top scorer: (Slovenia) Rok Možič
- Relegated to Serie A2: Tonno Callipo Calabria Vibo Valentia; Consar RCM Ravenna

Finals
- Champions: Cucine Lube Civitanova
- Runners-up: Sir Safety Conad Perugia
- Finals MVP: (Cuba) Robertlandy Simon

Italian Volleyball League seasons
- ← 2020–21 2022–23 →

The 2021–22 SuperLega was the 77th season of the highest tier domestic division in the Italian Men’s Volleyball League system since establishment in 1946. The league organized under the supervision of Federazione Italiana Pallavolo. The season started on 9 October 2021 and concluded on 13 May 2022.

Gioiella Prisma Taranto was promoted to SuperLega after winning the 2020–21 Serie A2. Cucine Lube Civitanova won the SuperLega after a 3–1 series win over Sir Safety Conad Perugia. Tonno Callipo Calabria Vibo Valentia and Consar RCM Ravenna are relegated to Serie A2 in the next season.

== Format ==
The regular season is composed of 13 teams and played as a total of 24 matches round-robin tournament. Each regular season match week, 12 teams will play and one will rest. Each team will play twice against every other team (half at home and half away). At the completion of the regular season, the eight best teams advanced to the championship play–offs and the teams ending in 12th and 13th are relegated to Serie A2 in the next season.

The eight best teams in the standings of regular season gain access to the Quarterfinals in the Championship play–offs with the classic pairing system (1st vs 8th, 2nd vs 7th, 3rd vs 6th and 4th vs 5th). Quarterfinals will play in Best–of–Three series, while semifinals and final will play in Best–of–Five series. The best seeded team will gain home field advantage and home courts are switched after every match. The top three teams in the final standing as per the Teams Ranking System (including result of the regular season) qualified for the 2022–23 CEV Champions League and the 4th place team qualified for the 2022–23 CEV Cup.

The four teams eliminated from Quarterfinals in the Championship play–offs will participate in 5th place play–offs with the teams finishing in 9th and 10th at the end of regular season. Preliminary round will play as a total of 5 matches round-robin tournament, the top four teams advanced to the final four. Semifinals and final will play in a single match on the court of best seeded team. The winner of the 5th place play–offs qualified for the 2022–23 CEV Cup.

The top four teams of the final standing also qualified for the Super Cup 2022 tournament.

== Teams ==
2021–22 SuperLega Teams
Team		Stadium	Map
MIL	Allianz Milano	PalaLido	2021–22 SuperLega is located in Italy
RAV	Consar RCM Ravenna	Pala De André	2021–22 SuperLega is located in Italy
CIV	Cucine Lube Civitanova	PalaCivitanova	2021–22 SuperLega is located in Italy
PIA	Gas Sales Bluenergy Piacenza	PalaBanca	2021–22 SuperLega is located in Italy
TRE	Itas Trentino	PalaTrento	2021–22 SuperLega is located in Italy
PAD	Kioene Padova	Kioene Arena	2021–22 SuperLega is located in Italy
MOD	Leo Shoes PerkinElmer Modena	PalaPanini	2021–22 SuperLega is located in Italy
PER	Sir Safety Conad Perugia	PalaEvangelisti	2021–22 SuperLega is located in Italy
VIB	Tonno Callipo Calabria Vibo Valentia	PalaMaiata	2021–22 SuperLega is located in Italy
CIS	Top Volley Cisterna	PalaCisterna	2021–22 SuperLega is located in Italy
MON	Vero Volley Monza	Candy Arena	2021–22 SuperLega is located in Italy
VER	Verona Volley	PalaOlimpia	2021–22 SuperLega is located in Italy
Promotion from Serie A2			2021–22 SuperLega is located in Italy
TAR	Gioiella Prisma Taranto	PalaMazzola	2021–22 SuperLega is located in Italy

== Squads ==
In the current season rules, Each teams involved in the tournament were required to register 14-player roster must be selected in each match. There's no limit of foreign players in the each team’s roster but it must have at least 3 Italian players on the court at all times.

Allianz Milano
No.	Name	Date of birth	Height	Position
1	(France) Barthélémy Chinenyeze	28 February 1998	2.04 m (6 ft 8 in)	Middle blocker
2	(Italy) Matteo Staforini	23 May 2003	1.92 m (6 ft 4 in)	Libero
5	(Italy) Nicola Daldello	6 May 1983	1.85 m (6 ft 1 in)	Setter
7	(Italy) Yuri Romanò	26 July 1997	2.03 m (6 ft 8 in)	Opposite
8	(Italy) Matteo Maiocchi	30 September 1998	1.91 m (6 ft 3 in)	Outside hitter
9	(France) Jean Patry	27 December 1996	2.08 m (6 ft 10 in)	Opposite
11	(Italy) Matteo Piano (C)	24 October 1990	2.09 m (6 ft 10 in)	Middle blocker
12	(Italy) Leandro Mosca	5 September 2000	2.09 m (6 ft 10 in)	Middle blocker
14	(Japan) Yūki Ishikawa	11 December 1995	1.92 m (6 ft 4 in)	Outside hitter
15	(Switzerland) Jovan Djokic	21 December 1993	1.90 m (6 ft 3 in)	Outside hitter
16	(Italy) Paolo Porro	27 October 2001	1.83 m (6 ft 0 in)	Setter
17	(United States) Thomas Jaeschke	4 September 1993	1.98 m (6 ft 6 in)	Outside hitter
18	(Italy) Nicola Pesaresi	11 February 1991	1.90 m (6 ft 3 in)	Libero
Head coach:		(Italy) Roberto Piazza		
Assistant coach:		(Italy) Marco Camperi		

Consar RCM Ravenna
No.	Name	Date of birth	Height	Position
1	(Montenegro) Marko Vukasinovic	3 July 1993	1.96 m (6 ft 5 in)	Outside hitter
4	(Italy) Lorenzo Ricci Maccarini	9 March 2003	1.90 m (6 ft 3 in)	Setter
5	(Poland) Mateusz Biernat	19 May 1992	1.95 m (6 ft 5 in)	Setter
6	(Italy) Matteo Pirazzoli	26 October 2000	1.88 m (6 ft 2 in)	Libero
7	(Italy) Alex Erati	24 June 1994	2.02 m (6 ft 8 in)	Middle blocker
8	(Brazil) André Luiz Queiroz	6 July 1992	1.88 m (6 ft 2 in)	Setter
9	(Switzerland) Luca Ulrich	12 January 1997	1.97 m (6 ft 6 in)	Outside hitter
10	(Italy) Riccardo Goi	24 August 1992	1.73 m (5 ft 8 in)	Libero
11	(Bulgaria) Dimitar Dimitrov	12 November 2000	2.06 m (6 ft 9 in)	Opposite
13	(Netherlands) Niels Klapwijk (C)	19 September 1985	2.00 m (6 ft 7 in)	Opposite
14	(Italy) Milan Peslac	14 March 1998	1.96 m (6 ft 5 in)	Setter
17	(North Macedonia) Aleksandar Ljaftov	15 August 1990	1.97 m (6 ft 6 in)	Outside hitter
22	(Italy) Francesco Comparoni	22 June 2001	2.04 m (6 ft 8 in)	Middle blocker
23	(Italy) Mattia Orioli	23 March 2004	1.98 m (6 ft 6 in)	Outside hitter
24	(Italy) Nicola Candeli	14 July 1993	2.00 m (6 ft 7 in)	Middle blocker
30	(Italy) Alessandro Bovolenta	27 May 2004	2.05 m (6 ft 9 in)	Opposite
99	(Italy) Francesco Fusaro	30 May 1999	2.01 m (6 ft 7 in)	Middle blocker
Head coach:		(Italy) Emanuele Zanini		
Assistant coach:		(Italy) Leondino Giombini		

Cucine Lube Civitanova
No.	Name	Date of birth	Height	Position
1	(Puerto Rico) Gabi Garcia Fernandez	8 January 1999	2.00 m (6 ft 7 in)	Opposite
2	(Italy) Jiri Kovar	10 April 1989	2.02 m (6 ft 8 in)	Outside hitter
3	(Italy) Daniele Sottile	17 August 1979	1.86 m (6 ft 1 in)	Setter
4	(Italy) Andrea Marchisio	6 November 1990	1.86 m (6 ft 1 in)	Libero
5	(Italy) Osmany Juantorena (C)	12 August 1985	2.00 m (6 ft 7 in)	Outside hitter
6	(Italy) Rok Jerončič	10 November 2001	2.07 m (6 ft 9 in)	Middle blocker
7	(Italy) Fabio Balaso	20 October 1995	1.78 m (5 ft 10 in)	Libero
8	(Brazil) Ricardo Lucarelli	14 February 1992	1.96 m (6 ft 5 in)	Outside hitter
9	(Italy) Ivan Zaytsev	2 October 1988	2.04 m (6 ft 8 in)	Opposite
12	(Italy) Enrico Diamantini	4 April 1993	2.04 m (6 ft 8 in)	Middle blocker
13	(Cuba) Robertlandy Simon	11 June 1987	2.08 m (6 ft 10 in)	Middle blocker
15	(Argentina) Luciano De Cecco	2 June 1988	1.94 m (6 ft 4 in)	Setter
17	(Italy) Simone Anzani	24 February 1992	2.03 m (6 ft 8 in)	Middle blocker
23	(Cuba) Marlon Yant Herrera	23 May 2001	2.04 m (6 ft 8 in)	Outside hitter
Head coach:		(Italy) Gianlorenzo Blengini		
Assistant coach:		(Italy) Romano Giannini		

Gas Sales Bluenergy Piacenza
No.	Name	Date of birth	Height	Position
1	(Turkey) Adis Lagumdzija	29 March 1999	2.11 m (6 ft 11 in)	Opposite
2	(United States) Aaron Russell	4 June 1993	2.05 m (6 ft 9 in)	Outside hitter
3	(Italy) Francesco Recine	7 February 1999	1.85 m (6 ft 1 in)	Outside hitter
4	(Italy) Damiano Catania	28 March 2001	1.80 m (5 ft 11 in)	Libero
5	(Slovenia) Tonček Štern	14 November 1995	2.00 m (6 ft 7 in)	Opposite
6	(France) Antoine Brizard (C)	22 May 1994	2.00 m (6 ft 7 in)	Setter
7	(Italy) Alessandro Tondo	18 August 1991	2.02 m (6 ft 8 in)	Middle blocker
8	(Italy) Oleg Antonov	28 July 1988	1.98 m (6 ft 6 in)	Outside hitter
9	(France) Thibault Rossard	28 August 1993	1.93 m (6 ft 4 in)	Outside hitter
10	(Italy) Leonardo Scanferla	4 December 1998	1.84 m (6 ft 0 in)	Libero
12	(Italy) Enrico Cester	16 March 1988	2.04 m (6 ft 8 in)	Middle blocker
13	(France) Pierre Pujol	13 July 1984	1.90 m (6 ft 3 in)	Setter
14	(United States) Maxwell Holt	12 March 1987	2.05 m (6 ft 9 in)	Middle blocker
18	(Italy) Edoardo Caneschi	26 January 1997	2.05 m (6 ft 9 in)	Middle blocker
Head coach:		(Italy) Lorenzo Bernardi		
Assistant coach:		(Italy) Massimo Botti		

Gioiella Prisma Taranto
No.	Name	Date of birth	Height	Position
1	(Italy) Tommaso Stefani	4 May 2001	2.10 m (6 ft 11 in)	Opposite
2	(Italy) Gabriele Laurenzano	12 June 2003	1.76 m (5 ft 9 in)	Libero
3	(Italy) Davide Pellegrino	24 January 1994	1.95 m (6 ft 5 in)	Setter
4	(Italy) Aimone Alletti	28 June 1988	2.07 m (6 ft 9 in)	Middle blocker
5	(Italy) Marco Falaschi (C)	18 September 1987	1.87 m (6 ft 2 in)	Setter
6	(Italy) Luigi Randazzo	30 April 1994	2.00 m (6 ft 7 in)	Outside hitter
7	(Brazil) João Rafael Ferreira	17 March 1993	1.91 m (6 ft 3 in)	Outside hitter
9	(Italy) Fabrizio Gironi	18 March 2000	2.00 m (6 ft 7 in)	Outside hitter
10	(Italy) Giulio Sabbi	10 August 1989	2.01 m (6 ft 7 in)	Opposite
13	(Italy) Filippo Pochini	13 November 1989	1.85 m (6 ft 1 in)	Libero
14	(Latvia) Gustavs Freimanis	22 September 2002	2.05 m (6 ft 9 in)	Middle blocker
18	(Italy) Gabriele Di Martino	20 July 1997	1.99 m (6 ft 6 in)	Middle blocker
22	(Australia) Arshdeep Dosanjh	30 July 1996	2.05 m (6 ft 9 in)	Setter
77	(Argentina) Luciano Palonsky	8 July 1999	1.98 m (6 ft 6 in)	Outside hitter
Head coach:		(Italy) Vincenzo Di Pinto		
Assistant coach:		(Italy) Saverio Di Lascio		

Itas Trentino
No.	Name	Date of birth	Height	Position
1	(Bulgaria) Matey Kaziyski (C)	23 September 1984	2.03 m (6 ft 8 in)	Outside hitter
3	(Belgium) Wout D'Heer	26 April 2001	2.03 m (6 ft 8 in)	Middle blocker
5	(Italy) Alessandro Michieletto	5 December 2001	2.05 m (6 ft 9 in)	Outside hitter
6	(Italy) Riccardo Sbertoli	23 May 1998	1.90 m (6 ft 3 in)	Setter
7	(Italy) Oreste Cavuto	5 December 1996	2.00 m (6 ft 7 in)	Outside hitter
10	(Italy) Giulio Pinali	2 April 1997	1.98 m (6 ft 6 in)	Opposite
12	(Italy) Daniele Albergati	21 June 1993	2.00 m (6 ft 7 in)	Opposite
15	(Italy) Daniele Lavia	4 November 1999	1.95 m (6 ft 5 in)	Outside hitter
16	(Germany) Julian Zenger	1 January 1997	1.90 m (6 ft 3 in)	Libero
18	(Serbia) Marko Podrascanin	29 August 1987	2.03 m (6 ft 8 in)	Middle blocker
20	(Serbia) Srecko Lisinac	17 May 1992	2.05 m (6 ft 9 in)	Middle blocker
22	(Italy) Lorenzo Sperotto	28 April 1999	1.90 m (6 ft 3 in)	Setter
24	(Italy) Carlo De Angelis	10 January 1996	1.90 m (6 ft 3 in)	Libero
Head coach:		(Italy) Angelo Lorenzetti		
Assistant coach:		(Italy) Francesco Petrella		

Kioene Padova
No.	Name	Date of birth	Height	Position
1	(Italy) Nicolò Bassanello	3 April 1996	1.83 m (6 ft 0 in)	Libero
3	(Italy) Mattia Gottardo	26 February 2001	1.90 m (6 ft 3 in)	Libero
4	(Canada) Eric Loeppky	1 August 1998	1.97 m (6 ft 6 in)	Outside hitter
5	(Italy) Andrea Schiro	10 September 2001	2.03 m (6 ft 8 in)	Outside hitter
6	(Italy) Marco Vitelli	4 April 1996	2.02 m (6 ft 8 in)	Middle blocker
7	(Italy) Francesco Zoppellari	27 May 1997	1.85 m (6 ft 1 in)	Setter
9	(Italy) Tommaso Guzzo	30 April 2002	1.97 m (6 ft 6 in)	Opposite
10	(Italy) Marco Volpato (C)	5 May 1990	1.98 m (6 ft 6 in)	Middle blocker
12	(Italy) Mattia Bottolo	3 January 2000	1.96 m (6 ft 5 in)	Outside hitter
14	(Japan) Ran Takahashi	2 September 2001	1.88 m (6 ft 2 in)	Outside hitter
17	(Germany) Jan Zimmermann	12 February 1993	1.90 m (6 ft 3 in)	Setter
18	(Italy) Andrea Canella	19 January 1998	2.00 m (6 ft 7 in)	Middle blocker
21	(Germany) Linus Weber	1 November 1999	2.02 m (6 ft 8 in)	Opposite
22	(Italy) Federico Crosato	22 May 2002	2.00 m (6 ft 7 in)	Middle blocker
25	(Bulgaria) Georgi Petrov	18 August 1999	1.97 m (6 ft 6 in)	Outside hitter
Head coach:		(Italy) Jacopo Cuttini		
Assistant coach:		(Italy) Matteo Trolese		

Leo Shoes PerkinElmer Modena
No.	Name	Date of birth	Height	Position
1	(Brazil) Bruno Rezende (C)	2 July 1986	1.90 m (6 ft 3 in)	Setter
3	(Netherlands) Maarten Van Garderen	24 January 1990	2.00 m (6 ft 7 in)	Outside hitter
5	(Italy) Riccardo Gollini	5 July 2000	1.94 m (6 ft 4 in)	Libero
6	(Italy) Giovanni Sanguinetti	14 April 2000	2.02 m (6 ft 8 in)	Middle blocker
7	(Italy) Dragan Stankovic	18 October 1985	2.05 m (6 ft 9 in)	Middle blocker
8	(France) Swan N'Gapeth	9 January 1992	1.85 m (6 ft 1 in)	Outside hitter
9	(France) Earvin N'Gapeth	12 February 1991	1.92 m (6 ft 4 in)	Outside hitter
10	(Italy) Lorenzo Sala	15 September 2002	2.00 m (6 ft 7 in)	Opposite
14	(Netherlands) Nimir Abdel-Aziz	5 February 1992	2.01 m (6 ft 7 in)	Opposite
16	(Italy) Nicola Salsi	13 September 1997	1.86 m (6 ft 1 in)	Setter
17	(Brazil) Yoandy Leal	31 August 1988	2.01 m (6 ft 7 in)	Outside hitter
18	(Italy) Daniele Mazzone	4 June 1992	2.07 m (6 ft 9 in)	Middle blocker
21	(Italy) Salvatore Rossini	13 July 1986	1.84 m (6 ft 0 in)	Libero
22	(Italy) Giuseppe Bellanova	10 January 2003	1.92 m (6 ft 4 in)	Setter
23	(Italy) Edoardo Sartoretti	8 October 2002	1.92 m (6 ft 4 in)	Opposite
24	(Italy) Ranieri Truocchio	12 March 2004	1.96 m (6 ft 5 in)	Outside hitter
26	(Italy) Luca Tauletta	6 October 2003	2.01 m (6 ft 7 in)	Middle blocker
Head coach:		(Italy) Andrea Giani		
Assistant coach:		(Italy) Sebastian Carotti		

Sir Safety Conad Perugia
No.	Name	Date of birth	Height	Position
1	(United States) Matthew Anderson	18 April 1987	2.04 m (6 ft 8 in)	Outside hitter
2	(Italy) Fabio Ricci	11 July 1994	2.05 m (6 ft 9 in)	Middle blocker
3	(Latvia) Kristers Dardzans	9 October 2001	1.95 m (6 ft 5 in)	Opposite
4	(Italy) Dragan Travica	28 August 1986	2.00 m (6 ft 7 in)	Setter
5	(Netherlands) Thijs Ter Horst	18 September 1991	2.05 m (6 ft 9 in)	Outside hitter
6	(Italy) Simone Giannelli	9 August 1996	2.00 m (6 ft 7 in)	Setter
8	(Luxembourg) Kamil Rychlicki	1 November 1996	2.04 m (6 ft 8 in)	Opposite
9	(Poland) Wilfredo León (C)	31 July 1993	2.01 m (6 ft 7 in)	Outside hitter
10	(Italy) Alessandro Piccinelli	30 January 1997	1.89 m (6 ft 2 in)	Libero
11	(Argentina) Sebastian Solé	12 June 1991	2.02 m (6 ft 8 in)	Middle blocker
12	(Italy) Roberto Russo	23 February 1997	2.05 m (6 ft 9 in)	Middle blocker
13	(Italy) Massimo Colaci	21 February 1985	1.80 m (5 ft 11 in)	Libero
17	(Ukraine) Oleh Plotnytskyi	5 June 1997	1.94 m (6 ft 4 in)	Outside hitter
23	(Italy) Stefano Mengozzi	6 May 1985	2.02 m (6 ft 8 in)	Middle blocker
Head coach:		(Serbia) Nikola Grbić		
Assistant coach:		(Italy) Antonio Valentini		

Tonno Callipo Calabria Vibo Valentia
No.	Name	Date of birth	Height	Position
1	(Germany) Christian Fromm	15 August 1990	2.04 m (6 ft 8 in)	Outside hitter
2	(Japan) Yuji Nishida	30 January 2000	1.86 m (6 ft 1 in)	Opposite
3	(Italy) Davide Luigi Russo	9 February 2001	1.80 m (5 ft 11 in)	Libero
3	(Italy) Gabriele Condorelli	21 June 2001	1.80 m (5 ft 11 in)	Libero
4	(Italy) Giovanni Maria Gargiulo	1 January 1999	2.08 m (6 ft 10 in)	Middle blocker
5	(Brazil) Maurício Borges Silva	4 February 1989	1.99 m (6 ft 6 in)	Outside hitter
7	(Italy) Fabio Bisi	16 July 1994	2.00 m (6 ft 7 in)	Opposite
8	(Italy) Davide Saitta (C)	23 June 1987	1.90 m (6 ft 3 in)	Setter
9	(Italy) Davide Candellaro	7 June 1989	2.00 m (6 ft 7 in)	Middle blocker
10	(France) Luka Basic	29 January 1995	2.01 m (6 ft 7 in)	Outside hitter
11	(Italy) Marco Rizzo	2 January 1990	1.85 m (6 ft 1 in)	Libero
13	(Brazil) Flávio Gualberto	22 April 1993	2.00 m (6 ft 7 in)	Middle blocker
14	(Brazil) Douglas Souza	20 August 1995	1.99 m (6 ft 6 in)	Outside hitter
15	(Italy) Pier Paolo Partenio	6 February 1993	1.97 m (6 ft 6 in)	Setter
16	(Italy) Alberto Nicotra	23 September 2002	1.95 m (6 ft 5 in)	Outside hitter
17	(Italy) Gabriele Nelli	4 December 1993	2.08 m (6 ft 10 in)	Opposite
Head coach:		(Italy) Valerio Baldovin		
Assistant coach:		(Italy) Francesco Guarnieri		

Top Volley Cisterna
No.	Name	Date of birth	Height	Position
1	(Australia) Aidan Zingel	19 November 1990	2.07 m (6 ft 9 in)	Middle blocker
3	(Italy) Domenico Cavaccini	13 March 1987	1.78 m (5 ft 10 in)	Libero
4	(Iran) Bardia Saadat	12 August 2002	2.05 m (6 ft 9 in)	Opposite
5	(Netherlands) Twan Wiltenburg	20 January 1997	2.05 m (6 ft 9 in)	Middle blocker
6	(Italy) Lorenzo Giani	1 November 2002	1.90 m (6 ft 3 in)	Setter
7	(Canada) Stephen Maar	6 December 1994	2.01 m (6 ft 7 in)	Outside hitter
9	(Italy) Tommaso Rinaldi	9 November 2001	2.00 m (6 ft 7 in)	Outside hitter
10	(Italy) Filippo Lanza	3 March 1991	1.96 m (6 ft 5 in)	Outside hitter
11	(Croatia) Petar Đirlić	27 May 1997	2.05 m (6 ft 9 in)	Opposite
12	(Italy) Matteo Picchio	12 February 2000	1.82 m (6 ft 0 in)	Libero
15	(Italy) Elia Bossi	15 August 1994	2.02 m (6 ft 8 in)	Middle blocker
17	(Italy) Michele Baranowicz (C)	5 August 1989	1.96 m (6 ft 5 in)	Setter
21	(Germany) Tobias Krick	22 October 1998	2.11 m (6 ft 11 in)	Middle blocker
31	(Canada) Arthur Szwarc	30 March 1995	2.07 m (6 ft 9 in)	Opposite
77	(Italy) Giacomo Raffaelli	7 February 1995	1.94 m (6 ft 4 in)	Outside hitter
Head coach:		(Italy) Fabio Soli		
Assistant coach:		(Italy) Maurizio Cibba		

Vero Volley Monza
No.	Name	Date of birth	Height	Position
1	(Bulgaria) Aleks Grozdanov	28 March 1998	2.05 m (6 ft 9 in)	Middle blocker
2	(Bulgaria) Denis Karyagin	28 September 2002	2.02 m (6 ft 8 in)	Outside hitter
3	(Italy) Tomasz Calligaro	29 March 1993	1.90 m (6 ft 3 in)	Setter
4	(Czech Republic) Donovan Dzavoronok	23 July 1997	2.02 m (6 ft 8 in)	Outside hitter
5	(Italy) Santiago Orduna	31 August 1983	1.83 m (6 ft 0 in)	Setter
7	(Italy) Filippo Federici	26 December 2000	1.82 m (6 ft 0 in)	Libero
8	(Italy) Alessandro Galliani	22 October 1998	1.97 m (6 ft 6 in)	Outside hitter
9	(Germany) György Grozer	27 November 1984	2.00 m (6 ft 7 in)	Opposite
11	(Italy) Gianluca Galassi	24 July 1997	2.01 m (6 ft 7 in)	Middle blocker
12	(Serbia) Milan Katić	22 October 1993	2.02 m (6 ft 8 in)	Outside hitter
13	(Italy) Thomas Beretta (C)	18 April 1990	2.05 m (6 ft 9 in)	Middle blocker
14	(Croatia) Tomislav Mitrašinović	14 February 2000	2.06 m (6 ft 9 in)	Opposite
15	(Belarus) Vlad Davyskiba	31 March 2001	1.97 m (6 ft 6 in)	Outside hitter
20	(Italy) Marco Gaggini	7 April 2002	1.84 m (6 ft 0 in)	Libero
Head coach:		(Italy) Massimo Eccheli		
Assistant coach:		(Italy) Giuseppe Ambrosio		

Verona Volley
No.	Name	Date of birth	Height	Position
1	(France) Jonas Aguenier	28 April 1992	2.02 m (6 ft 8 in)	Middle blocker
2	(Italy) Lorenzo Cortesia	26 July 1999	2.02 m (6 ft 8 in)	Middle blocker
3	(Italy) Giulio Magalini	14 August 2001	1.96 m (6 ft 5 in)	Outside hitter
7	(Brazil) Raphael de Oliveira (C)	14 June 1979	1.90 m (6 ft 3 in)	Setter
8	(Bulgaria) Asparuh Asparuhov	28 July 2000	2.00 m (6 ft 7 in)	Outside hitter
9	(Slovenia) Rok Možič	17 January 2002	2.00 m (6 ft 7 in)	Outside hitter
11	(Serbia) Uroš Nikolić	27 July 1998	2.09 m (6 ft 10 in)	Middle blocker
12	(Denmark) Mads Kyed Jensen	24 April 1999	2.09 m (6 ft 10 in)	Opposite
13	(Italy) Luca Spirito	30 October 1993	1.99 m (6 ft 6 in)	Setter
14	(Albania) Anton Qafarena	11 June 1997	2.04 m (6 ft 8 in)	Opposite
18	(Cameroon) Nathan Wounembaina	22 November 1984	1.98 m (6 ft 6 in)	Outside hitter
21	(Italy) Andrea Zanotti	28 October 1997	1.95 m (6 ft 5 in)	Middle blocker
22	(Italy) Francesco Donati	3 July 2001	1.73 m (5 ft 8 in)	Libero
29	(Italy) Federico Bonami	29 September 1993	1.83 m (6 ft 0 in)	Libero
Head coach:		(Bulgaria) Radostin Stoychev		
Assistant coach:		(Bulgaria) Cvetelin Ivanov		

== Transfer players ==
Allianz Milano
Moving from	Moving to
(United States) Thomas Jaeschke (Verona Volley); (France) Barthélémy Chinenyeze (Tonno Callipo Calabria Vibo Valentia); (Switzerland) Jovan Djokic (Chênois Genève); (Italy) Paolo Porro (Leo Shoes PerkinElmer Modena); (Italy) Yuri Romanò (Emma Villas Aubay Siena)	(Slovenia) Jan Kozamernik (Asseco Resovia); (Slovenia) Tine Urnaut (VC Zenit Saint Petersburg); (Canada) Stephen Maar (Top Volley Cisterna); (France) Luka Basic (Tonno Callipo Calabria Vibo Valentia); (Brazil) Luan Weber (Altekma Izmir); (Italy) Riccardo Sbertoli (Itas Trentino); (Italy) Matteo Meschiari (Tinet Prata di Pordenone)

Consar RCM Ravenna
Moving from	Moving to
(Poland) Mateusz Biernat (Gwardia Wrocław); (Netherlands) Niels Klapwijk (CS Arcada Galați); (North Macedonia) Aleksandar Ljaftov (VC Hebar Pazardzhik); (Bulgaria) Dimitar Dimitrov (VC CSKA Sofia); (Montenegro) Marko Vukašinović (Al-Hilal VC); (Switzerland) Luka Ulrich (Volley Schönenwerd); (Italy) Riccardo Goi (Gioiella Prisma Taranto); (Italy) Milan Peslac (Verona Volley); (Italy) Francesco Fusaro (Kioene Padova); (Italy) Alex Erati (BCC Castellana Grotte); (Italy) Nicola Candeli (Gruppo Consoli McDonald's Brescia)	(Slovenia) Jani Kovačič (ACH Volley); (Bulgaria) Aleks Grozdanov (Vero Volley Monza); (Canada) Eric Loeppky (Kioene Padova); (Canada) Brandon Koppers (MKS Będzin); (Serbia) Aleksa Batak; (Nigeria) Martins Arasomwan (Kemas Lamipel Santa Croce); (Italy) Francesco Recine (Gas Sales Bluenergy Piacenza); (Italy) Giulio Pinali (Itas Trentino); (Italy) Ludovico Giuliani (Abba Pineto); (Italy) Tommaso Stefani (Gioiella Prisma Taranto); (Italy) Paolo Zonca (Nice VB); (Italy) Nicolò Rossi (Sa.Ma. Portomaggiore)
During the season
(Brazil) André Luiz Queiroz (Solhan Spor Kulübü); (Italy) Lorenzo Ricci Maccarini (Consar Ravenna B); (Italy) Francesco Comparoni (Vero Volley Monza)	

Cucine Lube Civitanova
Moving from	Moving to
(Brazil) Ricardo Lucarelli (Itas Trentino); (Puerto Rico) Gabi Garcia Fernandez (Brigham Young University); (Italy) Rok Jerončič (OK Kamnik); (Italy) Ivan Zaytsev (VC Kuzbass Kemerovo); (Italy) Daniele Sottile (Top Volley Cisterna)	(Brazil) Yoandy Leal (Leo Shoes PerkinElmer Modena); (Luxembourg) Kamil Rychlicki (Sir Safety Conad Perugia); (Czech Republic) Jan Hadrava (Jastrzębski Węgiel); (Italy) Marco Falaschi (Gioiella Prisma Taranto); (Italy) Jacopo Larizza (Agnelli Tipiesse Bergamo)

Gas Sales Bluenergy Piacenza
Moving from	Moving to
(France) Thibault Rossard (Tonno Callipo Calabria Vibo Valentia); (France) Antoine Brizard (VC Zenit Saint Petersburg); (France) Pierre Pujol (Berlin Recycling Volleys); (Slovenia) Tonček Štern (Kioene Padova); (United States) Maxwell Holt (Vero Volley Monza); (Turkey) Adis Lagumdzija (Vero Volley Monza); (Italy) Enrico Cester (Tonno Callipo Calabria Vibo Valentia); (Italy) Francesco Recine (Consar RCM Ravenna); (Italy) Edoardo Caneschi (Verona Volley); (Italy) Damiano Catania (Banca Alpi Marittime Acqua San Bernardo Cuneo)	(Germany) György Grozer (Vero Volley Monza); (France) Trévor Clévenot (Jastrzębski Węgiel); (Iran) Mohammad Mousavi (Fenerbahçe HDI Sigorta); (Czech Republic) Michal Finger (Al Rayyan SC); (Cuba) Raydel Hierrezuelo Aguirre; (Italy) Michele Baranowicz (Top Volley Cisterna); (Italy) Davide Candellaro (Tonno Callipo Calabria Vibo Valentia); (Italy) Jacopo Botto (BAM Acqua S.Bernardo Cuneo); (Italy) Marco Izzo (BCC Castellana Grotte)

Gioiella Prisma Taranto
Moving from	Moving to
(Argentina) Luciano Palonsky (Tourcoing LM); (Brazil) João Rafael Ferreira (Funvic Taubaté); (Latvia) Gustavs Freimanis (SK Jēkabpils Lūši); (Italy) Luigi Randazzo (Top Volley Cisterna); (Italy) Giulio Sabbi (Top Volley Cisterna); (Italy) Marco Falaschi (Cucine Lube Civitanova); (Italy) Tommaso Stefani (Consar RCM Ravenna); (Italy) Gabriele Laurenzano (Materdominivolley.it Castellana Grotte); (Italy) Peppino Carbone (Pallavolo Franco Tigano Palmi); (Italy) Davide Pellegrino (Libellula Fulgor Tricase); (Italy) Filippo Pochini (Synergy Mondovì)	(Cuba) Williams Padura Diaz (Agnelli Tipiesse Bergamo); (Italy) Simone Parodi (Tours VB); (Italy) Riccardo Goi (Consar RCM Ravenna); (Italy) Manuel Coscione (Pool Libertas Cantù); (Italy) Alessio Fiore (BCC Castellana Grotte); (Italy) Luca Presta (BCC Castellana Grotte); (Italy) Francesco Cottarelli (Sistemia Aci Castello); (Italy) Paolo Cascio (Videx Grottazzolina); (Italy) Nicolò Hoffer (Rinascita Lagonegro); (Italy) Sandi Persoglia (Abba Pineto); (Italy) Roberto Cominetti (Conad Reggio Emilia)
During the season
(Australia) Arshdeep Dosanjh (Avşar Maden Suyu Afyon Belediye Yüntaş)	(Argentina) Luciano Palonsky (Tours VB); (Brazil) João Rafael Ferreira; (Italy) Davide Pellegrino (OmiFer Palmi)

Itas Trentino
Moving from	Moving to
(Bulgaria) Matey Kaziyski (Verona Volley); (Germany) Julian Zenger (Berlin Recycling Volleys); (Italy) Daniele Lavia (Leo Shoes PerkinElmer Modena); (Italy) Riccardo Sbertoli (Allianz Milano); (Italy) Oreste Cavuto (Top Volley Cisterna); (Italy) Giulio Pinali (Consar RCM Ravenna); (Italy) Daniele Albergati (Sa.Ma. Portomaggiore)	(Netherlands) Nimir Abdel-Aziz (Leo Shoes PerkinElmer Modena); (Brazil) Ricardo Lucarelli (Cucine Lube Civitanova); (Cuba) Luis Tomas Sosa (TV Amriswil Volleyball); (Italy) Simone Giannelli (Sir Safety Conad Perugia); (Italy) Salvatore Rossini (Leo Shoes PerkinElmer Modena); (Italy) Dick Kooy (PGE Skra Bełchatów); (Italy) Lorenzo Cortesia (Verona Volley); (Italy) Andrea Argenta (Rinascita Lagonegro)

Kioene Padova
Moving from	Moving to
(Germany) Jan Zimmermann (Sir Safety Conad Perugia); (Germany) Linus Weber (VfB Friedrichshafen); (Canada) Eric Loeppky (Consar RCM Ravenna); (Bulgaria) Georgi Petrov (Chaumont VB 52); (Italy) Nicolò Bassanello (Volley Team San Donà di Piave); (Italy) Federico Crosato (Volley Treviso); (Italy) Andrea Schiro	(Poland) Wojciech Włodarczyk (LUK Politechnika Lublin); (Slovenia) Tonček Štern (Gas Sales Bluenergy Piacenza); (United States) Kawika Shoji (Spor Toto); (Argentina) Santiago Danani (Berlin Recycling Volleys); (Austria) Alexander Tusch (Neftochimik Burgas); (Italy) Sebastiano Milan (Rinascita Lagonegro); (Italy) Francesco Fusaro (Consar RCM Ravenna); (Italy) Leonardo Ferrato (HRK Motta di Livenza); (Italy) Pietro Merlo (Volley Team San Donà di Piave); (Italy) Nicolò Casaro (Aurispa Libellula Lecce)
During the season
(Japan) Ran Takahashi (Nippon Sport Science University)	

Leo Shoes PerkinElmer Modena
Moving from	Moving to
(Brazil) Yoandy Leal (Cucine Lube Civitanova); (Brazil) Bruno Rezende (Funvic Taubaté); (Netherlands) Nimir Abdel-Aziz (Itas Trentino); (Netherlands) Maarten Van Garderen (Ziraat Bankası Ankara); (France) Earvin N'Gapeth (VC Zenit-Kazan); (France) Swan N'Gapeth (Stade Poitevin Poitiers); (Italy) Salvatore Rossini (Itas Trentino); (Italy) Nicola Salsi (Rinascita Lagonegro); (Italy) Lorenzo Sala; (Italy) Riccardo Gollini; (Italy) Giuseppe Bellanova; (Italy) Edoardo Sartoretti; (Italy) Luca Tauletta	(United States) Micah Christenson (VC Zenit-Kazan); (France) Jenia Grebennikov (VC Zenit Saint Petersburg); (Germany) Moritz Karlitzek (Arago de Sète); (Austria) Paul Buchegger (Spor Toto); (Serbia) Nemanja Petrić (Biełogorje Biełgorod); (Cuba) Luis Estrada (Funvic Taubaté); (Italy) Tommaso Rinaldi (Top Volley Cisterna); (Italy) Daniele Lavia (Itas Trentino); (Italy) Luca Vettori (Shanghai Golden Age); (Italy) Paolo Porro (Allianz Milano); (Italy) Elia Bossi (Top Volley Cisterna); (Italy) Giovanni Sanguinetti; (Italy) Nicola Iannelli

Sir Safety Conad Perugia
Moving from	Moving to
(United States) Matthew Anderson (Shanghai Golden Age); (Luxembourg) Kamil Rychlicki (Cucine Lube Civitanova); (Latvia) Kristers Dardzans (SK Jēkabpils Lūši); (Italy) Simone Giannelli (Itas Trentino); (Italy) Stefano Mengozzi (Consar RCM Ravenna)	(Poland) Maciej Muzaj (Asseco Resovia); (Serbia) Aleksandar Atanasijević (PGE Skra Bełchatów); (Canada) Sharone Vernon-Evans (Osaka Blazers Sakai); (Germany) Jan Zimmermann (Kioene Padova); (Germany) David Sossenheimer (AS Cannes VB); (Italy) Omar Biglino (HRK Motta di Livenza)

Tonno Callipo Calabria Vibo Valentia
Moving from	Moving to
(Japan) Yuji Nishida (JTEKT Stings); (Brazil) Flávio Gualberto (Aluron CMC Warta Zawiercie); (Brazil) Douglas Souza (Funvic Taubaté); (Brazil) Maurício Borges Silva (Funvic Taubaté); (France) Luka Basic (Allianz Milano); (Italy) Davide Candellaro (Gas Sales Bluenergy Piacenza); (Italy) Pier Paolo Partenio (Abba Pineto); (Italy) Fabio Bisi (Gruppo Consoli McDonald's Brescia); (Italy) Alberto Nicotra (Sistemia Aci Castello)	(United States) Torey Defalco (Indykpol AZS Olsztyn); (France) Thibault Rossard (Gas Sales Bluenergy Piacenza); (France) Barthélémy Chinenyeze (Allianz Milano); (Brazil) Aboubacar Dramé Neto (Tours VB); (Brazil) Victor Cardoso (SESI São Paulo); (Croatia) Petar Đirlić (Top Volley Cisterna); (United States) Dante Chakravorti (Synergy VBC Mondovì); (Italy) Enrico Cester Gas Sales Bluenergy Piacenza); (Italy) Simone Sardanelli (Olimpia SBV Galatina); (Italy) Andrea Fioretti (Abba Pineto); (Italy) Francesco Corrado (Aurispa Libellula Lecce); (Italy) Davide Russo (Geovertical Geosat Lagonegro)
During the season
(Germany) Christian Fromm (AS Cannes Volley-Ball); (Italy) Gabriele Nelli (AS Cannes Volley-Ball); (Italy) Gabriele Condorelli (Geovertical Geosat Lagonegro)	(Italy) Davide Luigi Russo; (Italy) Fabio Bisi (Atlantide Pallavolo Brescia)

Top Volley Cisterna
Moving from	Moving to
(Canada) Stephen Maar (Allianz Milano); (Australia) Aidan Zingel (Verona Volley); (Italy) Tommaso Rinaldi (Leo Shoes PerkinElmer Modena); (Italy) Michele Baranowicz (Gas Sales Bluenergy Piacenza); (Italy) Lorenzo Giani (Vero Volley Monza); (Italy) Elia Bossi (Leo Shoes PerkinElmer Modena); (Italy) Giacomo Raffaelli (Stade Poitevin Poitiers); (Italy) Matteo Picchio (Pool Libertas Cantù)	(Bulgaria) Georgi Seganov (Cizre Belediyesi); (France) Kévin Tillie (Tours VB); (Italy) Oreste Cavuto (Itas Trentino); (Italy) Luigi Randazzo (Gioiella Prisma Taranto); (Italy) Giulio Sabbi (Gioiella Prisma Taranto); (Italy) Daniele Sottile (Cucine Lube Civitanova); (Italy) Andrea Rossi (Emma Villas Aubay Siena); (Italy) Samuel Onwuelo (Emma Villas Aubay Siena); (Italy) Luca Rossato (Opus Sabaudia); (Italy) Andrea Rondoni (Tinet Prata di Pordenone)
During the season
(Iran) Bardia Saadat (OK Niš); (Croatia) Petar Đirlić (Tonno Callipo Calabria Vibo Valentia); (Netherlands) Twan Wiltenburg (Tectum Achel); (Italy) Filippo Lanza (Chaumont Volley-Ball 52)	(Italy) Filippo Lanza (Shanghai Golden Age)

Vero Volley Monza
Moving from	Moving to
(Germany) György Grozer (Gas Sales Bluenergy Piacenza); (Bulgaria) Aleks Grozdanov (Consar RCM Ravenna); (Bulgaria) Denis Karyagin (Neftochimic Burgas); (Croatia) Tomislav Mitrašinović (HAOK Mladost); (Italy) Alessandro Galliani (Pool Libertas Cantù); (Italy) Francesco Comparoni (Zephyr Trading La Spezia); (Italy) Marco Gaggini	(United States) Maxwell Holt (Gas Sales Bluenergy Piacenza); (Turkey) Adis Lagumdzija (Gas Sales Bluenergy Piacenza); (Poland) Mateusz Poręba (Indykpol AZS Olsztyn); (Cuba) Daniel Alejandro Ramirez Pita; (Italy) Lorenzo Giani (Top Volley Cisterna); (Italy) Simone Falgari; (Italy) Davide Brunetti (Sa.Ma. Portomaggiore)
During the season
(Serbia) Milan Katić (LKPS Lublin)	(Croatia) Tomislav Mitrašinović (Cambrai Volley); (Italy) Francesco Comparoni (Consar RCM Ravenna)

Verona Volley
Moving from	Moving to
(Slovenia) Rok Možič (Merkur Maribor); (Brazil) Raphael Vieira de Oliveira (Funvic Taubaté); (Serbia) Uroš Nikolić (OK Niš); (Albania) Anton Qafarena (Barkom-Każany Lwów); (Italy) Lorenzo Cortesia (Itas Trentino)	(Bulgaria) Matey Kaziyski (Itas Trentino); (United States) Thomas Jaeschke (Allianz Milano); (Australia) Aidan Zingel (Top Volley Cisterna); (Italy) Edoardo Caneschi (Gas Sales Bluenergy Piacenza); (Italy) Milan Peslac (Consar RCM Ravenna)
During the season
(Cameroon) Nathan Wounembaina (Al Arabi Ad-Dauha)	

== Pool standing procedure ==
1. Highest number of result points, the teams will be ranked by the most point gained per match as follows:
  - Match won 3–0 or 3–1: 3 points for the winner, 0 points for the loser
  - Match won 3–2: 2 points for the winner, 1 point for the loser
  - Match forfeited: 3 points for the winner, 0 points (0–25, 0–25, 0–25) for the loser
2. In the event of a tie, the following first tiebreaker will apply: total number of victories (matches won, matches lost)
3. If teams are still tied after examining the most point gained and the number of victories, then will examine the results in order to break the tie in the following order:
  - Set quotient: if two or more teams are tied on the number of points gained, they will be ranked by the quotient resulting from the division of the number of all set won by the number of all sets lost.
  - Points quotient: if the tie persists based on the set quotient, the teams will be ranked by the quotient resulting from the division of all points scored by the total of points lost during all sets.
  - If the tie persists based on the point quotient, the tie will be broken based on the team that won the match of the Round Robin Phase between the tied teams. When the tie in point quotient is between three or more teams, these teams ranked taking into consideration only the matches involving the teams in question.

== Regular season ==
- All times are local, CEST (UTC+02:00) between 10 and 30 October and CET (UTC+01:00) from 31 October.

=== League table ===
Pos	Team	Pld	W	L	Pts	SW	SL	SR	SPW	SPL	SPR	Qualification or relegation
1	Sir Safety Conad Perugia	24	22	2	67	70	18	3.889	2136	1809	1.181	Quarterfinals
2	Cucine Lube Civitanova	24	19	5	57	62	20	3.100	1957	1733	1.129	Quarterfinals
3	Itas Trentino	24	17	7	53	59	33	1.788	2121	1935	1.096	Quarterfinals
4	Leo Shoes PerkinElmer Modena	24	18	6	51	62	34	1.824	2250	2092	1.076	Quarterfinals
5	Allianz Milano	24	13	11	41	50	44	1.136	2132	2085	1.023	Quarterfinals
6	Gas Sales Bluenergy Piacenza	24	12	12	37	47	44	1.068	2057	2035	1.011	Quarterfinals
7	Vero Volley Monza	24	11	13	31	42	50	0.840	2024	2057	0.984	Quarterfinals
8	Top Volley Cisterna	24	10	14	30	43	52	0.827	2126	2161	0.984	Quarterfinals
9	Verona Volley	24	10	14	27	37	56	0.661	2053	2149	0.955	5th place play–offs
10	Gioiella Prisma Taranto	24	8	16	26	37	53	0.698	1942	2094	0.927	5th place play–offs
11	Kioene Padova	24	9	15	24	37	58	0.638	2052	2170	0.946	
12	Tonno Callipo Calabria Vibo Valentia	24	7	17	22	30	56	0.536	1890	2019	0.936	Relegated to Serie A2
13	Consar RCM Ravenna	24	0	24	2	14	72	0.194	1694	2095	0.809	Relegated to Serie A2

=== Results table ===
Home \ Away	MIL	RAV	CIV	PIA	TAR	TRE	PAD	MOD	PER	VIB	CIS	MON	VER
Allianz Milano		3–1	0–3	3–1	3–1	0–3	3–1	2–3	1–3	3–0	2–3	3–2	3–1
Consar RCM Ravenna	2–3		0–3	1–3	0–3	0–3	1–3	0–3	0–3	1–3	1–3	1–3	1–3
Cucine Lube Civitanova	3–0	3–0		2–3	3–0	3–2	3–0	3–1	1–3	3–0	3–1	3–0	3–0
Gas Sales Bluenergy Piacenza	3–2	3–1	0–3		3–0	1–3	3–0	2–3	0–3	3–0	3–1	3–0	3–0
Gioiella Prisma Taranto	2–3	3–0	0–3	3–1		1–3	3–0	3–1	1–3	1–3	3–1	2–3	3–0
Itas Trentino	3–2	3–0	3–1	3–1	3–0		2–3	2–3	3–2	3–0	3–0	3–1	3–0
Kioene Padova	0–3	3–2	0–3	3–2	2–3	1–3		0–3	1–3	3–1	3–2	0–3	3–0
Leo Shoes PerkinElmer Modena	3–0	3–1	3–1	1–3	3–1	3–0	3–1		2–3	3–0	2–3	3–0	3–0
Sir Safety Conad Perugia	3–0	3–0	3–0	3–1	3–0	3–0	3–1	3–2		3–0	3–0	3–1	3–0
Tonno Callipo Calabria Vibo Valentia	0–3	3–0	0–3	0–3	3–1	1–3	3–2	1–3	0–3		2–3	2–3	3–0
Top Volley Cisterna	0–3	3–0	0–3	3–0	3–1	3–0	1–3	2–3	1–3	3–1		2–3	1–3
Vero Volley Monza	0–3	3–0	0–3	3–0	3–0	1–3	2–3	3–1	1–3	0–3	3–1		3–2
Verona Volley	3–2	3–1	1–3	3–2	3–2	3–2	3–1	1–3	1–3	3–1	1–3	3–1	

Source: Results and Standings – Regular Season SuperLega Credem Banca
Legend: Blue = left column team win; Red = top row team win.

=== Fixtures and results ===
==== Leg 1 ====
Matchday 1

Date	Time		Score		Set 1	Set 2	Set 3	Set 4	Set 5	Total	Report
9 Oct	18:00	Kioene Padova	0–3	Cucine Lube Civitanova	21–25	20–25	19–25			60–75	Report
10 Oct	15:30	Gas Sales Bluenergy Piacenza	3–1	Consar RCM Ravenna	25–17	25–17	19–25	27–25		96–84	Report
10 Oct	18:00	Sir Safety Conad Perugia	3–0	Top Volley Cisterna	25–22	25–18	25–23			75–63	Report
10 Oct	18:00	Vero Volley Monza	3–1	Leo Shoes PerkinElmer Modena	24–26	25–23	28–26	25–20		102–95	Report
10 Oct	20:30	Gioiella Prisma Taranto	1–3	Tonno Callipo Calabria Vibo Valentia	19–25	17–25	25–22	20–25		81–97	Report
12 Oct	20:30	Itas Trentino	3–0	Verona Volley	25–16	29–27	25–23			79–66	Report

Matchday 2

Date	Time		Score		Set 1	Set 2	Set 3	Set 4	Set 5	Total	Report
16 Oct	18:00	Consar RCM Ravenna	0–3	Gioiella Prisma Taranto	18–25	22–25	19–25			59–75	Report
16 Oct	20:30	Top Volley Cisterna	1–3	Kioene Padova	22–25	22–25	25–19	22–25		91–94	Report
17 Oct	15:30	Cucine Lube Civitanova	2–3	Gas Sales Bluenergy Piacenza	25–23	16–25	25–23	22–25	12–15	100–111	Report
17 Oct	18:00	Allianz Milano	3–2	Vero Volley Monza	18–25	27–25	25–15	20–25	15–8	105–98	Report
17 Oct	18:00	Verona Volley	1–3	Sir Safety Conad Perugia	18–25	19–25	25–22	23–25		85–97	Report
17 Oct	20:30	Tonno Callipo Calabria Vibo Valentia	1–3	Itas Trentino	21–25	16–25	29–27	21–25		87–102	Report

Matchday 3

Date	Time		Score		Set 1	Set 2	Set 3	Set 4	Set 5	Total	Report
30 Oct	18:00	Gas Sales Bluenergy Piacenza	3–2	Allianz Milano	16–25	25–21	26–24	20–25	15–6	102–101	Report
30 Oct	20:30	Leo Shoes PerkinElmer Modena	3–0	Tonno Callipo Calabria Vibo Valentia	25–20	26–24	25–22			76–66	Report
31 Oct	15:30	Verona Volley	1–3	Top Volley Cisterna	20–25	27–29	25–19	21–25		93–98	Report
31 Oct	18:00	Itas Trentino	3–1	Cucine Lube Civitanova	25–16	21–25	25–11	26–24		97–76	Report
31 Oct	18:00	Kioene Padova	3–2	Consar RCM Ravenna	25–14	23–25	25–18	21–25	15–8	109–90	Report
31 Oct	20:30	Vero Volley Monza	3–0	Gioiella Prisma Taranto	25–18	25–23	25–18			75–59	Report

Matchday 4

Date	Time		Score		Set 1	Set 2	Set 3	Set 4	Set 5	Total	Report
3 Nov	20:30	Cucine Lube Civitanova	3–0	Verona Volley	25–22	25–20	25–20			75–62	Report
3 Nov	20:30	Itas Trentino	2–3	Kioene Padova	25–17	28–30	24–26	25–16	17–19	119–108	Report
3 Nov	20:30	Tonno Callipo Calabria Vibo Valentia	0–3	Allianz Milano	20–25	29–31	23–25			72–81	Report
3 Nov	20:30	Leo Shoes PerkinElmer Modena	1–3	Gas Sales Bluenergy Piacenza	25–20	21–25	20–25	23–25		89–95	Report
3 Nov	20:30	Consar RCM Ravenna	1–3	Vero Volley Monza	17–25	19–25	25–19	14–25		75–94	Report
3 Nov	20:30	Gioiella Prisma Taranto	1–3	Sir Safety Conad Perugia	19–25	25–23	16–25	17–25		77–98	Report

Matchday 5

Date	Time		Score		Set 1	Set 2	Set 3	Set 4	Set 5	Total	Report
6 Nov	18:00	Top Volley Cisterna	3–1	Tonno Callipo Calabria Vibo Valentia	25–23	27–25	20–25	25–20		97–93	Report
7 Nov	15:30	Allianz Milano	0–3	Cucine Lube Civitanova	26–28	26–28	23–25			75–81	Report
7 Nov	15:30	Verona Volley	3–2	Gioiella Prisma Taranto	24–26	25–20	25–23	19–25	15–13	108–107	Report
7 Nov	18:00	Sir Safety Conad Perugia	3–0	Itas Trentino	25–12	25–21	25–18			75–51	Report
7 Nov	18:00	Vero Volley Monza	3–0	Gas Sales Bluenergy Piacenza	25–22	25–21	25–17			75–60	Report
7 Nov	20:30	Consar RCM Ravenna	0–3	Leo Shoes PerkinElmer Modena	19–25	17–25	25–27			61–77	Report

Matchday 6

Date	Time		Score		Set 1	Set 2	Set 3	Set 4	Set 5	Total	Report
13 Nov	18:00	Gioiella Prisma Taranto	3–0	Kioene Padova	25–22	25–21	25–20			75–63	Report
13 Nov	20:30	Sir Safety Conad Perugia	3–0	Allianz Milano	25–20	25–19	25–12			75–51	Report
14 Nov	15:30	Itas Trentino	3–1	Vero Volley Monza	19–25	25–16	27–25	25–23		96–89	Report
14 Nov	18:00	Cucine Lube Civitanova	3–1	Leo Shoes PerkinElmer Modena	22–25	29–27	25–19	30–28		106–99	Report
14 Nov	18:00	Tonno Callipo Calabria Vibo Valentia	3–0	Consar RCM Ravenna	25–20	25–22	25–21			75–63	Report
14 Nov	20:30	Gas Sales Bluenergy Piacenza	3–1	Top Volley Cisterna	23–25	25–22	25–23	25–21		98–91	Report

Matchday 7

Date	Time		Score		Set 1	Set 2	Set 3	Set 4	Set 5	Total	Report
20 Nov	18:00	Top Volley Cisterna	2–3	Vero Volley Monza	18–25	25–23	23–25	25–16	14–16	105–105	Report
21 Nov	15:30	Tonno Callipo Calabria Vibo Valentia	0–3	Cucine Lube Civitanova	17–25	19–25	16–25			52–75	Report
21 Nov	18:00	Leo Shoes PerkinElmer Modena	3–0	Itas Trentino	28–26	25–15	25–22			78–63	Report
21 Nov	18:00	Allianz Milano	3–1	Verona Volley	24–26	25–22	25–20	25–18		99–86	Report
21 Nov	18:00	Consar RCM Ravenna	0–3	Sir Safety Conad Perugia	10–25	20–25	16–25			46–75	Report
21 Nov	20:30	Kioene Padova	3–2	Gas Sales Bluenergy Piacenza	20–25	21–25	25–22	25–23	15–8	106–103	Report

Matchday 8

Date	Time		Score		Set 1	Set 2	Set 3	Set 4	Set 5	Total	Report
23 Nov	20:30	Allianz Milano	2–3	Top Volley Cisterna	34–32	21–25	33–31	21–25	13–15	122–128	Report
24 Nov	20:30	Sir Safety Conad Perugia	2–3	Leo Shoes PerkinElmer Modena	22–25	12–25	25–15	25–22	15–17	99–104	Report
24 Nov	20:30	Cucine Lube Civitanova	3–0	Consar RCM Ravenna	25–18	25–19	25–16			75–53	Report
24 Nov	20:30	Vero Volley Monza	2–3	Kioene Padova	23–25	25–14	17–25	25–22	12–15	102–101	Report
24 Nov	20:30	Verona Volley	3–1	Tonno Callipo Calabria Vibo Valentia	25–22	25–22	26–28	26–24		102–96	Report
24 Nov	20:30	Gioiella Prisma Taranto	1–3	Itas Trentino	23–25	27–25	18–25	19–25		87–100	Report

Matchday 9

Date	Time		Score		Set 1	Set 2	Set 3	Set 4	Set 5	Total	Report
27 Nov	18:00	Tonno Callipo Calabria Vibo Valentia	2–3	Vero Volley Monza	25–23	25–22	20–25	18–25	6–15	94–110	Report
27 Nov	20:30	Consar RCM Ravenna	2–3	Allianz Milano	24–26	21–25	25–23	25–21	12–15	107–110	Report
28 Nov	15:30	Gas Sales Bluenergy Piacenza	3–0	Gioiella Prisma Taranto	25–18	28–26	25–15			78–59	Report
28 Nov	18:00	Leo Shoes PerkinElmer Modena	3–0	Verona Volley	27–25	25–22	25–21			77–68	Report
28 Nov	18:00	Top Volley Cisterna	0–3	Cucine Lube Civitanova	23–25	23–25	15–25			61–75	Report
28 Nov	20:30	Kioene Padova	1–3	Sir Safety Conad Perugia	22–25	25–21	22–25	17–25		86–96	Report

Matchday 10

Date	Time		Score		Set 1	Set 2	Set 3	Set 4	Set 5	Total	Report
18 Nov	20:30	Cucine Lube Civitanova	3–0	Gioiella Prisma Taranto	25–20	25–21	25–12			75–53	Report
18 Nov	20:30	Itas Trentino	3–1	Gas Sales Bluenergy Piacenza	25–15	21–25	25–21	25–23		96–84	Report
4 Dec	18:00	Verona Volley	3–1	Consar RCM Ravenna	25–16	25–17	22–25	25–20		97–78	Report
5 Dec	15:30	Sir Safety Conad Perugia	3–0	Tonno Callipo Calabria Vibo Valentia	25–21	25–22	25–13			75–56	Report
5 Dec	18:00	Allianz Milano	3–1	Kioene Padova	25–21	25–21	17–25	26–24		93–91	Report
5 Dec	18:00	Top Volley Cisterna	2–3	Leo Shoes PerkinElmer Modena	27–25	25–19	18–25	18–25	11–15	99–109	Report

Matchday 11

Date	Time		Score		Set 1	Set 2	Set 3	Set 4	Set 5	Total	Report
10 Nov	20:30	Vero Volley Monza	0–3	Cucine Lube Civitanova	21–25	17–25	16–25			54–75	Report
10 Nov	20:30	Consar RCM Ravenna	0–3	Itas Trentino	16–25	23–25	12–25			51–75	Report
8 Dec	15:30	Gioiella Prisma Taranto	3–1	Top Volley Cisterna	26–28	25–22	29–27	27–25		107–102	Report
8 Dec	18:00	Gas Sales Bluenergy Piacenza	0–3	Sir Safety Conad Perugia	21–25	22–25	14–25			57–75	Report
8 Dec	18:00	Kioene Padova	3–0	Verona Volley	25–21	25–16	25–21			75–58	Report
8 Dec	20:30	Leo Shoes PerkinElmer Modena	3–0	Allianz Milano	25–17	25–20	25–15			75–52	Report

Matchday 12

Date	Time		Score		Set 1	Set 2	Set 3	Set 4	Set 5	Total	Report
11 Dec	18:00	Tonno Callipo Calabria Vibo Valentia	3–2	Kioene Padova	25–22	25–20	19–25	24–26	15–10	108–103	Report
12 Dec	15:30	Leo Shoes PerkinElmer Modena	3–1	Gioiella Prisma Taranto	17–25	27–25	25–19	25–16		94–85	Report
12 Dec	18:00	Sir Safety Conad Perugia	3–1	Vero Volley Monza	25–14	25–18	22–25	25–20		97–77	Report
12 Dec	18:00	Top Volley Cisterna	3–0	Consar RCM Ravenna	25–16	25–16	25–16			75–48	Report
23 Dec	19:00	Verona Volley	3–2	Gas Sales Bluenergy Piacenza	18–25	25–22	15–25	25–20	15–10	98–102	Report
30 Dec	20:30	Allianz Milano	0–3	Itas Trentino	22–25	18–25	26–28			66–78	Report

Matchday 13

Date	Time		Score		Set 1	Set 2	Set 3	Set 4	Set 5	Total	Report
18 Dec	18:00	Kioene Padova	0–3	Leo Shoes PerkinElmer Modena	22–25	21–25	18–25			61–75	Report
19 Dec	15:30	Vero Volley Monza	3–2	Verona Volley	25–17	23–25	26–24	22–25	17–15	113–106	Report
19 Dec	18:00	Cucine Lube Civitanova	1–3	Sir Safety Conad Perugia	15–25	20–25	30–28	21–25		86–103	Report
19 Dec	20:30	Itas Trentino	3–0	Top Volley Cisterna	25–15	25–14	25–22			75–51	Report
2 Jan	20:30	Gioiella Prisma Taranto	2–3	Allianz Milano	29–27	22–25	16–25	25–21	10–15	102–113	Report
12 Jan	20:30	Gas Sales Bluenergy Piacenza	3–0	Tonno Callipo Calabria Vibo Valentia	27–25	25–22	25–23			77–70	Report

==== Leg 2 ====
Matchday 14

Date	Time		Score		Set 1	Set 2	Set 3	Set 4	Set 5	Total	Report
26 Dec	15:30	Cucine Lube Civitanova	3–0	Kioene Padova	25–20	25–17	25–20			75–57	Report
26 Dec	16:30	Top Volley Cisterna	1–3	Sir Safety Conad Perugia	27–25	19–25	10–25	19–25		75–100	Report
26 Dec	18:00	Verona Volley	3–2	Itas Trentino	13–25	29–31	25–20	25–10	15–12	107–98	Report
30 Dec	20:30	Leo Shoes PerkinElmer Modena	3–0	Vero Volley Monza	25–19	25–22	25–21			75–62	Report
9 Feb	19:30	Tonno Callipo Calabria Vibo Valentia	3–1	Gioiella Prisma Taranto	25–15	22–25	25–20	25–22		97–82	Report
2 Mar	20:30	Consar RCM Ravenna	1–3	Gas Sales Bluenergy Piacenza	24–26	26–24	22–25	20–25		92–100	Report

Matchday 15

Date	Time		Score		Set 1	Set 2	Set 3	Set 4	Set 5	Total	Report
29 Dec	20:30	Sir Safety Conad Perugia	3–0	Verona Volley	25–20	25–20	25–18			75–58	Report
30 Dec	20:30	Kioene Padova	3–2	Top Volley Cisterna	25–17	22–25	17–25	37–35	15–11	116–113	Report
19 Jan	20:30	Gas Sales Bluenergy Piacenza	0–3	Cucine Lube Civitanova	17–25	28–30	21–25			66–80	Report
26 Jan	20:30	Gioiella Prisma Taranto	3–0	Consar RCM Ravenna	25–19	25–20	29–27			79–66	Report
26 Jan	20:30	Vero Volley Monza	0–3	Allianz Milano	22–25	16–25	22–25			60–75	Report
2 Mar	20:30	Itas Trentino	3–0	Tonno Callipo Calabria Vibo Valentia	25–17	25–21	25–20			75–58	Report

Matchday 16

Date	Time		Score		Set 1	Set 2	Set 3	Set 4	Set 5	Total	Report
5 Jan	17:00	Gioiella Prisma Taranto	2–3	Vero Volley Monza	25–22	23–25	25–19	18–25	10–15	101–106	Report
6 Jan	18:00	Tonno Callipo Calabria Vibo Valentia	1–3	Leo Shoes PerkinElmer Modena	22–25	25–21	22–25	22–25		91–96	Report
6 Jan	20:30	Allianz Milano	3–1	Gas Sales Bluenergy Piacenza	31–29	23–25	25–22	25–18		104–94	Report
29 Jan	18:00	Top Volley Cisterna	1–3	Verona Volley	25–23	20–25	23–25	21–25		89–98	Report
2 Feb	20:30	Cucine Lube Civitanova	3–2	Itas Trentino	20–25	25–20	17–25	25–22	15–13	102–105	Report
9 Feb	20:30	Consar RCM Ravenna	1–3	Kioene Padova	21–25	21–25	25–23	18–25		85–98	Report

Matchday 17

Date	Time		Score		Set 1	Set 2	Set 3	Set 4	Set 5	Total	Report
9 Jan	15:30	Allianz Milano	3–0	Tonno Callipo Calabria Vibo Valentia	25–18	25–19	25–13			75–50	Report
9 Jan	18:00	Gas Sales Bluenergy Piacenza	2–3	Leo Shoes PerkinElmer Modena	22–25	18–25	25–18	25–23	13–15	103–106	Report
2 Feb	20:30	Sir Safety Conad Perugia	3–0	Gioiella Prisma Taranto	25–17	25–23	25–23			75–63	Report
16 Feb	18:00	Vero Volley Monza	3–0	Consar RCM Ravenna	25–14	25–19	25–20			75–53	Report
22 Feb	20:30	Kioene Padova	1–3	Itas Trentino	25–27	16–25	25–20	21–25		87–97	Report
12 Mar	18:00	Verona Volley	1–3	Cucine Lube Civitanova	14–25	25–23	20–25	18–25		77–98	Report

Matchday 18

Date	Time		Score		Set 1	Set 2	Set 3	Set 4	Set 5	Total	Report
2 Jan	18:00	Itas Trentino	3–2	Sir Safety Conad Perugia	25–21	21–25	26–24	22–25	15–11	109–106	Report
2 Jan	18:00	Gas Sales Bluenergy Piacenza	3–0	Vero Volley Monza	25–23	25–17	34–32			84–72	Report
16 Jan	18:00	Gioiella Prisma Taranto	3–0	Verona Volley	25–23	25–23	25–14			75–60	Report
16 Feb	19:30	Tonno Callipo Calabria Vibo Valentia	2–3	Top Volley Cisterna	17–25	21–25	25–21	25–17	14–16	102–104	Report
9 Mar	20:30	Leo Shoes PerkinElmer Modena	3–1	Consar RCM Ravenna	25–16	26–24	19–25	25–17		95–82	Report
23 Mar	20:30	Cucine Lube Civitanova	3–0	Allianz Milano	25–22	25–19	25–22			75–63	Report

Matchday 19

Date	Time		Score		Set 1	Set 2	Set 3	Set 4	Set 5	Total	Report
30 Jan	15:30	Kioene Padova	2–3	Gioiella Prisma Taranto	21–25	18–25	25–21	25–17	12–15	101–103	Report
30 Jan	18:00	Allianz Milano	1–3	Sir Safety Conad Perugia	21–25	19–25	25–23	20–25		85–98	Report
30 Jan	18:00	Consar RCM Ravenna	1–3	Tonno Callipo Calabria Vibo Valentia	21–25	19–25	25–23	22–25		87–98	Report
30 Jan	20:30	Vero Volley Monza	1–3	Itas Trentino	25–23	13–25	21–25	20–25		79–98	Report
9 Feb	20:30	Top Volley Cisterna	3–0	Gas Sales Bluenergy Piacenza	25–17	26–24	25–23			76–64	Report
5 Mar	20:30	Leo Shoes PerkinElmer Modena	3–1	Cucine Lube Civitanova	25–21	22–25	25–20	25–20		97–86	Report

Matchday 20

Date	Time		Score		Set 1	Set 2	Set 3	Set 4	Set 5	Total	Report
5 Feb	18:00	Verona Volley	3–2	Allianz Milano	17–25	25–15	19–25	25–23	23–21	109–109	Report
5 Feb	18:30	Cucine Lube Civitanova	3–0	Tonno Callipo Calabria Vibo Valentia	25–17	25–17	25–12			75–46	Report
5 Feb	20:30	Sir Safety Conad Perugia	3–0	Consar RCM Ravenna	25–18	25–23	25–16			75–57	Report
6 Feb	18:00	Itas Trentino	2–3	Leo Shoes PerkinElmer Modena	25–23	25–22	19–25	18–25	13–15	100–110	Report
6 Feb	18:00	Vero Volley Monza	3–1	Top Volley Cisterna	22–25	25–23	25–23	25–18		97–89	Report
16 Feb	19:30	Gas Sales Bluenergy Piacenza	3–0	Kioene Padova	25–20	25–17	25–19			75–56	Report

Matchday 21

Date	Time		Score		Set 1	Set 2	Set 3	Set 4	Set 5	Total	Report
12 Feb	18:30	Kioene Padova	0–3	Vero Volley Monza	21–25	17–25	22–25			60–75	Report
13 Feb	15:00	Itas Trentino	3–0	Gioiella Prisma Taranto	25–22	25–19	25–14			75–55	Report
13 Feb	18:00	Leo Shoes PerkinElmer Modena	2–3	Sir Safety Conad Perugia	20–25	28–30	25–18	26–24	13–15	112–112	Report
13 Feb	18:00	Consar RCM Ravenna	0–3	Cucine Lube Civitanova	18–25	20–25	21–25			59–75	Report
13 Feb	18:00	Tonno Callipo Calabria Vibo Valentia	3–0	Verona Volley	26–24	25–14	25–23			76–61	Report
13 Feb	20:30	Top Volley Cisterna	0–3	Allianz Milano	21–25	11–25	24–26			56–76	Report

Matchday 22

Date	Time		Score		Set 1	Set 2	Set 3	Set 4	Set 5	Total	Report
19 Feb	18:00	Vero Volley Monza	0–3	Tonno Callipo Calabria Vibo Valentia	23–25	23–25	21–25			67–75	Report
20 Feb	15:30	Gioiella Prisma Taranto	3–1	Gas Sales Bluenergy Piacenza	25–19	25–23	25–27	25–22		100–91	Report
20 Feb	18:00	Sir Safety Conad Perugia	3–1	Kioene Padova	19–25	25–22	25–22	25–13		94–82	Report
20 Feb	20:30	Verona Volley	1–3	Leo Shoes PerkinElmer Modena	21–25	25–27	30–28	21–25		97–105	Report
20 Feb	20:30	Allianz Milano	3–1	Consar RCM Ravenna	22–25	25–18	25–19	25–19		97–81	Report
2 Mar	20:30	Cucine Lube Civitanova	3–1	Top Volley Cisterna	17–25	25–21	25–18	25–20		92–84	Report

Matchday 23

Date	Time		Score		Set 1	Set 2	Set 3	Set 4	Set 5	Total	Report
26 Feb	18:00	Consar RCM Ravenna	1–3	Verona Volley	21–25	15–25	26–24	20–25		82–99	Report
26 Feb	20:30	Leo Shoes PerkinElmer Modena	2–3	Top Volley Cisterna	31–33	12–25	25–19	25–17	8–15	101–109	Report
27 Feb	15:00	Tonno Callipo Calabria Vibo Valentia	0–3	Sir Safety Conad Perugia	25–27	21–25	23–25			69–77	Report
27 Feb	18:00	Gioiella Prisma Taranto	0–3	Cucine Lube Civitanova	26–28	19–25	23–25			68–78	Report
27 Feb	18:00	Gas Sales Bluenergy Piacenza	1–3	Itas Trentino	25–23	15–25	17–25	14-25		71–73	Report
27 Feb	20:30	Kioene Padova	0–3	Allianz Milano	18–25	20–25	22–25			60–75	Report

Matchday 24

Date	Time		Score		Set 1	Set 2	Set 3	Set 4	Set 5	Total	Report
22 Jan	15:00	Itas Trentino	3–0	Consar RCM Ravenna	26–24	25–21	25–14			76–59	Report
22 Jan	18:00	Verona Volley	3–1	Kioene Padova	22–25	25–18	25–20	25–21		97–84	Report
23 Jan	15:30	Top Volley Cisterna	3–1	Gioiella Prisma Taranto	22–25	25–14	25–23	25–15		97–77	Report
23 Jan	18:00	Cucine Lube Civitanova	3–0	Vero Volley Monza	25–19	25–16	25–17			75–52	Report
17 Feb	19:00	Allianz Milano	2–3	Leo Shoes PerkinElmer Modena	25–21	21–25	21–25	27–25	10–15	104–111	Report
23 Feb	20:30	Sir Safety Conad Perugia	3–1	Gas Sales Bluenergy Piacenza	25–18	19–25	29–27	25–20		98–90	Report

Matchday 25

Date	Time		Score		Set 1	Set 2	Set 3	Set 4	Set 5	Total	Report
10 Mar	20:00	Gas Sales Bluenergy Piacenza	3–0	Verona Volley	25–19	25–23	25–20			75–62	Report
13 Mar	16:00	Vero Volley Monza	1–3	Sir Safety Conad Perugia	21–25	32–30	23–25	22–25		98–105	Report
13 Mar	17:00	Gioiella Prisma Taranto	3–1	Leo Shoes PerkinElmer Modena	25–21	25–23	17–25	25–19		92–88	Report
13 Mar	18:00	Consar RCM Ravenna	1–3	Top Volley Cisterna	25–20	11–25	21–25	19–25		76–95	Report
13 Mar	18:00	Kioene Padova	3–1	Tonno Callipo Calabria Vibo Valentia	22–25	25–22	25–21	25–22		97–90	Report
13 Mar	18:00	Itas Trentino	3–2	Allianz Milano	28–30	25–21	25–20	23–25	15–9	116–105	Report

Matchday 26

Date	Time		Score		Set 1	Set 2	Set 3	Set 4	Set 5	Total	Report
20 Mar	18:00	Sir Safety Conad Perugia	3–0	Cucine Lube Civitanova	25–21	25–22	31–29			81–72	Report
20 Mar	18:00	Top Volley Cisterna	3–0	Itas Trentino	28–26	25–19	25–23			78–68	Report
20 Mar	18:00	Verona Volley	3–1	Vero Volley Monza	22–25	25–19	25–18	27–25		99–87	Report
20 Mar	18:00	Tonno Callipo Calabria Vibo Valentia	0–3	Gas Sales Bluenergy Piacenza	29–31	23–25	20–25			72–81	Report
20 Mar	18:00	Leo Shoes PerkinElmer Modena	3–1	Kioene Padova	33–31	25–19	23–25	25–22		106–97	Report
20 Mar	18:00	Allianz Milano	3–1	Gioiella Prisma Taranto	25–17	23–25	25–18	25–20		98–80	Report

== Championship play–offs ==
- All times are local, Central European Summer Time (UTC+02:00).

=== Bracket ===
Quarterfinals
1	Sir Safety Conad Perugia	3	3	2
8	Top Volley Cisterna	1	0	0
4	Leo Shoes PerkinElmer Modena	3	3	2
5	Allianz Milano	0	2	0
2	Cucine Lube Civitanova	3	3	2
7	Vero Volley Monza	0	1	0
3	Itas Trentino	3	2	3	2
6	Gas Sales Bluenergy Piacenza	0	3	0	1

Semifinals
1	Sir Safety Conad Perugia	1	3	2	3	3	3
4	Leo Shoes PerkinElmer Modena	3	1	3	2	1	2
2	Cucine Lube Civitanova	0	0	3	3	3	3
3	Itas Trentino	3	3	0	1	2	2

Finals
1	Sir Safety Conad Perugia	2	0	3	0	1
2	Cucine Lube Civitanova	3	3	1	3	3

=== Quarterfinals ===
(1) Sir Safety Conad Perugia vs. (8) Top Volley Cisterna

Date	Time		Score		Set 1	Set 2	Set 3	Set 4	Set 5	Total	Report
27 Mar	18:00	Sir Safety Conad Perugia	3–1	Top Volley Cisterna	25–15	19–25	25–17	26–24		95–81	Report
3 Apr	18:00	Top Volley Cisterna	0–3	Sir Safety Conad Perugia	23–25	20–25	20–25			63–75	Report

(2) Cucine Lube Civitanova vs. (7) Vero Volley Monza

Date	Time		Score		Set 1	Set 2	Set 3	Set 4	Set 5	Total	Report
27 Mar	18:00	Cucine Lube Civitanova	3–0	Vero Volley Monza	25–17	25–14	25–15			75–46	Report
2 Apr	18:00	Vero Volley Monza	1–3	Cucine Lube Civitanova	26–28	25–19	17–25	23–25		91–97	Report

(3) Itas Trentino vs. (6) Gas Sales Bluenergy Piacenza

Date	Time		Score		Set 1	Set 2	Set 3	Set 4	Set 5	Total	Report
26 Mar	20:30	Itas Trentino	3–0	Gas Sales Bluenergy Piacenza	27–25	25–20	25–16			77–61	Report
3 Apr	18:00	Gas Sales Bluenergy Piacenza	3–2	Itas Trentino	21–25	29–31	25–19	25–20	24–22	124–117	Report
10 Apr	18:30	Itas Trentino	3–0	Gas Sales Bluenergy Piacenza	25–22	25–19	25–21			75–62	Report

(4) Leo Shoes PerkinElmer Modena vs. (5) Allianz Milano

Date	Time		Score		Set 1	Set 2	Set 3	Set 4	Set 5	Total	Report
27 Mar	18:00	Leo Shoes PerkinElmer Modena	3–0	Allianz Milano	25–11	25–19	25–19			75–49	Report
3 Apr	18:00	Allianz Milano	2–3	Leo Shoes PerkinElmer Modena	25–17	14–25	25–22	18–25	13–15	95–104	Report

=== Semifinals ===
(1) Sir Safety Conad Perugia vs. (4) Leo Shoes PerkinElmer Modena

Date	Time		Score		Set 1	Set 2	Set 3	Set 4	Set 5	Total	Report
13 Apr	20:30	Sir Safety Conad Perugia	1–3	Leo Shoes PerkinElmer Modena	22–25	25–22	22–25	20–25		89–97	Report
17 Apr	18:00	Leo Shoes PerkinElmer Modena	1–3	Sir Safety Conad Perugia	23–25	25–22	21–25	21–25		90–97	Report
20 Apr	20:30	Sir Safety Conad Perugia	2–3	Leo Shoes PerkinElmer Modena	26–24	25–22	16–25	29–31	13–15	109–117	Report
24 Apr	18:00	Leo Shoes PerkinElmer Modena	2–3	Sir Safety Conad Perugia	25–21	17–25	16–25	25–19	12–15	95–105	Report
27 Apr	20:30	Sir Safety Conad Perugia	3–1	Leo Shoes PerkinElmer Modena	19–25	25–20	27–25	25–15		96–85	Report

(2) Cucine Lube Civitanova vs. (3) Itas Trentino

Date	Time		Score		Set 1	Set 2	Set 3	Set 4	Set 5	Total	Report
14 Apr	20:30	Cucine Lube Civitanova	0–3	Itas Trentino	26–28	20–25	23–25			69–78	Report
18 Apr	18:00	Itas Trentino	3–0	Cucine Lube Civitanova	25–20	25–21	25–23			75–64	Report
21 Apr	20:30	Cucine Lube Civitanova	3–0	Itas Trentino	25–16	25–19	25–17			75–52	Report
24 Apr	18:00	Itas Trentino	1–3	Cucine Lube Civitanova	19–25	29–27	22–25	22–25		92–102	Report
27 Apr	20:30	Cucine Lube Civitanova	3–2	Itas Trentino	27–29	25–21	21–25	25–15	15–11	113–101	Report

=== Final ===
Date	Time		Score		Set 1	Set 2	Set 3	Set 4	Set 5	Total	Report
1 May	18:00	Sir Safety Conad Perugia	2–3	Cucine Lube Civitanova	17–25	28–26	25–20	17–25	13–15	100–111	Report
4 May	20:30	Cucine Lube Civitanova	3–0	Sir Safety Conad Perugia	25–21	29–27	25–22			79–70	Report
8 May	18:00	Sir Safety Conad Perugia	3–1	Cucine Lube Civitanova	24–26	25–19	25–18	26–24		100–87	Report
11 May	20:30	Cucine Lube Civitanova	3–0	Sir Safety Conad Perugia	25–23	25–16	25–21			75–60	Report

== 5th place play–offs ==
=== Preliminary round ===
- All times are local, Central European Summer Time (UTC+02:00).

==== League table ====
Pos	Team	Pld	W	L	Pts	SW	SL	SR	SPW	SPL	SPR	Qualification
1	Gas Sales Bluenergy Piacenza	5	5	0	14	15	3	5.000	435	385	1.130	Semifinals
2	Top Volley Cisterna	5	3	2	10	11	7	1.571	427	374	1.142	Semifinals
3	Vero Volley Monza	5	3	2	9	9	8	1.125	360	385	0.935	Semifinals
4	Verona Volley	5	2	3	6	10	11	0.909	453	480	0.944	Semifinals
5	Allianz Milano	5	2	3	6	9	10	0.900	442	438	1.009	
6	Gioiella Prisma Taranto	5	0	5	0	0	15	0.000	332	387	0.858	

==== Fixtures and results ====
Matchday 1

Date	Time		Score		Set 1	Set 2	Set 3	Set 4	Set 5	Total	Report
16 Apr	20:30	Allianz Milano	1–3	Vero Volley Monza	25–13	23–25	23–25	18–25		89–88	Report
17 Apr	18:00	Gas Sales Bluenergy Piacenza	3–0	Top Volley Cisterna	25–18	25–22	25–22			75–62	Report
17 Apr	18:00	Verona Volley	3–0	Gioiella Prisma Taranto	28–26	25–22	25–17			78–65	Report

Matchday 2

Date	Time		Score		Set 1	Set 2	Set 3	Set 4	Set 5	Total	Report
23 Apr	18:00	Vero Volley Monza	3–1	Verona Volley	25–23	17–25	25–13	25–16		92–77	Report
24 Apr	16:30	Gioiella Prisma Taranto	0–3	Gas Sales Bluenergy Piacenza	25–27	20–25	24–26			69–78	Report
24 Apr	18:00	Allianz Milano	1–3	Top Volley Cisterna	20–25	25–21	21–25	16–25		82–96	Report

Matchday 3

Date	Time		Score		Set 1	Set 2	Set 3	Set 4	Set 5	Total	Report
27 Apr	20:30	Top Volley Cisterna	3–0	Gioiella Prisma Taranto	25–15	31–29	25–22			81–66	Report
27 Apr	20:30	Gas Sales Bluenergy Piacenza	3–0	Vero Volley Monza	25–17	25–20	25–23			75–60	Report
27 Apr	20:30	Verona Volley	1–3	Allianz Milano	26–28	25–22	16–25	25–27		92–102	Report

Matchday 4

Date	Time		Score		Set 1	Set 2	Set 3	Set 4	Set 5	Total	Report
30 Apr	17:00	Gioiella Prisma Taranto	0–3	Allianz Milano	17–25	23–25	23–25			63–75	Report
30 Apr	18:00	Vero Volley Monza	0–3	Top Volley Cisterna	16–25	16–25	13–25			45–75	Report
30 Apr	20:30	Gas Sales Bluenergy Piacenza	3–2	Verona Volley	23–25	25–22	25–19	20–25	15–9	108–100	Report

Matchday 5

Date	Time		Score		Set 1	Set 2	Set 3	Set 4	Set 5	Total	Report
3 May	17:00	Vero Volley Monza	3–0	Gioiella Prisma Taranto	25–23	25–23	25–23			75–69	Report
3 May	20:30	Allianz Milano	1–3	Gas Sales Bluenergy Piacenza	25–20	27–29	23–25	19–25		94–99	Report
3 May	20:30	Top Volley Cisterna	2–3	Verona Volley	24–26	25–16	22–25	25–20	17–19	113–106	Report

== 5th–8th places ==
- All times are local, Central European Summer Time (UTC+02:00).

=== Bracket ===
Semifinals
1	Gas Sales Bluenergy Piacenza	3
4	Verona Volley	1
2	Top Volley Cisterna	3
3	Vero Volley Monza	1

Finals
1	Gas Sales Bluenergy Piacenza	3
2	Top Volley Cisterna	1

=== 5th–8th semifinals ===
Date	Time		Score		Set 1	Set 2	Set 3	Set 4	Set 5	Total	Report
7 May	20:30	Gas Sales Bluenergy Piacenza	3–1	Verona Volley	25–22	25–11	19–25	25–19		94–77	Report
7 May	20:00	Top Volley Cisterna	3–1	Vero Volley Monza	15–25	25–20	25–22	26–24		91–91	Report

=== 5th place match ===
Date	Time		Score		Set 1	Set 2	Set 3	Set 4	Set 5	Total	Report
13 May	20:30	Gas Sales Bluenergy Piacenza	3–1	Top Volley Cisterna	25–23	25–19	26–28	25–20		101–90	Report

== Final standings ==
Qualified for the 2022–23 CEV Champions League
Qualified for the 2022–23 CEV Cup
Relegated to Serie A2

Rank	Team
1st place, gold medalist(s)	Cucine Lube Civitanova
2nd place, silver medalist(s)	Sir Safety Conad Perugia
3rd place, bronze medalist(s)	Itas Trentino
3rd place, bronze medalist(s)	Leo Shoes PerkinElmer Modena
5	Gas Sales Bluenergy Piacenza
6	Top Volley Cisterna
7	Vero Volley Monza
7	Verona Volley
9	Allianz Milano
10	Gioiella Prisma Taranto
11	Kioene Padova
12	Tonno Callipo Calabria Vibo Valentia
13	Consar RCM Ravenna

2021–22 Italian SuperLega champions

7th title

14–man roster
Gabi Garcia Fernandez, Jiri Kovar, Andrea Marchisio, Fabio Balaso, Osmany Juantorena (c), Rok Jerončič, Ricardo Lucarelli, Ivan Zaytsev, Enrico Diamantini, Robertlandy Simon, Luciano De Cecco, Simone Anzani, Marlon Yant Herrera
Head coach
Gianlorenzo Blengini

== Awards ==
=== Best Player of the Month ===
- Credem Banca MVP of October: (Germany) Georg Grozer
- Credem Banca MVP of November: (Italy) Mattia Bottolo
- Credem Banca MVP of December: (Netherlands) Nimir Abdel-Aziz
- Credem Banca MVP of January: (Italy) Francesco Recine
- Credem Banca MVP of February: (Slovenia) Rok Možič
- Credem Banca MVP of the Quarterfinals: (Italy) Alessandro Michieletto
- Credem Banca MVP of the Semifinals: (Argentina) Luciano De Cecco
- Credem Banca MVP of the Finals: (Cuba) Robertlandy Simón

=== Awards of the Season ===
- Best coach
  (Italy) Angelo Lorenzetti (Itas Trentino)
- Best U–23 Player
  (Italy) Alessandro Michieletto (Itas Trentino)
- Best scorer
  (Slovenia) Rok Možič (Verona Volley)
- Best receiver
  (Italy) Alessandro Piccinelli (Sir Safety Conad Perugia)
- Best server
  (Puerto Rico) Gabi Garcia Fernandez (Cucine Lube Civitanova)
  (Poland) Wilfredo León (Sir Safety Conad Perugia)
- Best spiker
  (Poland) Wilfredo León (Sir Safety Conad Perugia)
  (Slovenia) Rok Možič (Verona Volley)
- Best middle blocker
  (Cuba) Robertlandy Simón (Cucine Lube Civitanova)
- Best blocker
  (Italy) Matteo Piano (Allianz Milano)
- Best Referee
  (Italy) Andrea Puecher
- Best Press Officer
  (Italy) Gian Paolo Maini (Leo Shoes PerkinElmer Modena)

== Growth of the league ==
The data of the Sponsor Value research by StageUp and Ipsos highlight the great growth of the top volleyball league. At the end of the 2021/22 season, the pool of people interested in the volleyball SuperLega, the top men's championship, is 15,419,000 people. The number reflects an increase of +8.8% compared to November 2021, and even 3.7 million units compared to May 2020. In the same research, the most interested league in Italy is Serie A football which reached 28 million people.

== Statistics leaders ==
=== Regular season ===
The stats are officially checked by the Federazione Italiana Pallavolo from 7 p.m. (local time) of the day after the last match. The table below shows the top 10 ranked players in each skill plus top scorers as of March 24, 2022.

Best Scorers

Rank	Name	Team	Points
1	(Slovenia) Rok Možič	Verona Volley	466
2	(Netherlands) Nimir Abdel-Aziz	Leo Shoes PerkinElmer Modena	431
3	(Poland) Wilfredo León	Sir Safety Conad Perugia	420
4	(Germany) Linus Weber	Kioene Padova	414
5	(Czech Republic) Donovan Dzavoronok	Vero Volley Monza	378
6	(France) Earvin N'Gapeth	Leo Shoes PerkinElmer Modena	368
7	(Netherlands) Niels Klapwijk	Consar RCM Ravenna	353
8	(United States) Thomas Jaeschke	Allianz Milano	350
9	(Brazil) Yoandy Leal	Leo Shoes PerkinElmer Modena	338
9	(Italy) Mattia Bottolo	Kioene Padova	338

Best Spikers

Rank	Name	Team	%Succ
1	(Poland) Wilfredo León	Sir Safety Conad Perugia	53.82
2	(Netherlands) Nimir Abdel-Aziz	Leo Shoes PerkinElmer Modena	53.01
3	(Cuba) Marlon Yant Herrera	Cucine Lube Civitanova	52.49
4	(Italy) Tommaso Stefani	Gioiella Prisma Taranto	52.43
5	(Bulgaria) Matey Kaziyski	Itas Trentino	50.64
6	(Brazil) Yoandy Leal	Leo Shoes PerkinElmer Modena	50.60
7	(Luxembourg) Kamil Rychlicki	Sir Safety Conad Perugia	50.41
8	(Slovenia) Rok Možič	Verona Volley	49.94
9	(Belarus) Vlad Davyskiba	Vero Volley Monza	49.47
10	(Italy) Alessandro Michieletto	Itas Trentino	49.28

Best Blockers

Rank	Name	Team	Avg
1	(Italy) Matteo Piano	Allianz Milano	0.80
2	(Serbia) Marko Podrascanin	Itas Trentino	0.68
3	(Brazil) Flávio Gualberto	Tonno Callipo Calabria Vibo Valentia	0.67
4	(Australia) Aidan Zingel	Top Volley Cisterna	0.64
5	(France) Barthélémy Chinenyeze	Allianz Milano	0.62
6	(Cuba) Robertlandy Simon	Cucine Lube Civitanova	0.60
7	(Italy) Marco Vitelli	Kioene Padova	0.60
8	(Italy) Gabriele Di Martino	Gioiella Prisma Taranto	0.60
9	(Belgium) Wout D'Heer	Itas Trentino	0.57
10	(Serbia) Srećko Lisinac	Itas Trentino	0.56

Best Servers

Rank	Name	Team	Avg
1	(Poland) Wilfredo León	Sir Safety Conad Perugia	0.77
2	(Japan) Yuji Nishida	Tonno Callipo Calabria Vibo Valentia	0.70
3	(Germany) György Grozer	Vero Volley Monza	0.61
4	(Germany) Linus Weber	Kioene Padova	0.54
5	(Italy) Mattia Bottolo	Kioene Padova	0.49
6	(Brazil) Ricardo Lucarelli	Cucine Lube Civitanova	0.49
7	(Ukraine) Oleh Plotnytskyi	Sir Safety Conad Perugia	0.49
8	(Puerto Rico) Gabi García Fernández	Cucine Lube Civitanova	0.48
9	(Czech Republic) Donovan Dzavoronok	Vero Volley Monza	0.47
10	(Bulgaria) Matey Kaziyski	Itas Trentino	0.46

Best Setters

Rank	Name	Team	%Succ
1	(France) Antoine Brizard	Gas Sales Bluenergy Piacenza	68.71
2	(Brazil) Bruno Rezende	Leo Shoes PerkinElmer Modena	61.17
3	(Italy) Santiago Orduna	Vero Volley Monza	60.48
4	(Italy) Simone Giannelli	Sir Safety Conad Perugia	52.52
5	(Italy) Luca Spirito	Verona Volley	51.90
6	(Brazil) Raphael Vieira de Oliveira	Verona Volley	48.47
7	(Italy) Dragan Travica	Sir Safety Conad Perugia	42.42
8	(Argentina) Luciano De Cecco	Cucine Lube Civitanova	38.01
9	(Germany) Jan Zimmermann	Kioene Padova	32.31
10	(Italy) Davide Saitta	Tonno Callipo Calabria Vibo Valentia	30.19

Best Diggers

Rank	Name	Team	%Succ
1	(Italy) Fabio Balaso	Cucine Lube Civitanova	60.27
2	(Ukraine) Oleh Plotnytskyi	Sir Safety Conad Perugia	59.29
3	(France) Earvin N'Gapeth	Leo Shoes PerkinElmer Modena	59.02
4	(Brazil) Ricardo Lucarelli	Cucine Lube Civitanova	58.47
5	(Slovenia) Rok Možič	Verona Volley	56.63
6	(Italy) Salvatore Rossini	Leo Shoes PerkinElmer Modena	56.54
7	(Italy) Federico Bonami	Verona Volley	55.87
8	(Brazil) Bruno Rezende	Leo Shoes PerkinElmer Modena	54.44
9	(United States) Matt Anderson	Sir Safety Conad Perugia	54.44
10	(France) Thibault Rossard	Gas Sales Bluenergy Piacenza	54.14

Best Receivers

Rank	Name	Team	%Succ
1	(Italy) Alessandro Piccinelli	Sir Safety Conad Perugia	36.49
2	(Italy) Gabriele Laurenzano	Gioiella Prisma Taranto	34.88
3	(France) Thibault Rossard	Gas Sales Bluenergy Piacenza	33.73
4	(Italy) Federico Bonami	Verona Volley	33.53
5	(Brazil) Maurício Borges Silva	Tonno Callipo Calabria Vibo Valentia	31.94
6	(Brazil) João Rafael Ferreira	Gioiella Prisma Taranto	31.50
7	(Montenegro) Marko Vukašinović	Consar RCM Ravenna	31.47
8	(Italy) Francesco Recine	Gas Sales Bluenergy Piacenza	31.02
9	(Italy) Daniele Lavia	Itas Trentino	30.11
10	(Italy) Leonardo Scanferla	Gas Sales Bluenergy Piacenza	30.11
