= 2021 FIVB Men's Volleyball Nations League squads =

This article shows the roster of all participating teams at the 2021 FIVB Men's Volleyball Nations League.

== Argentina ==
The following is the Argentine roster in the 2021 Men's Nations League.

Head coach: (Argentina) Marcelo Méndez

- 2 Federico Pereyra OP
- 3 Jan Martínez Franchi OH
- 5 Nicolás Uriarte S
- 6 Cristian Poglajen OH
- 7 Facundo Conte OH
- 8 Agustín Loser MB
- 9 Santiago Danani L
- 10 Nicolás Lazo OH
- 11 Sebastián Solé MB
- 12 Bruno Lima OP
- 13 Ezequiel Palacios OH
- 14 Pablo Crer MB
- 15 Luciano De Cecco S
- 16 Luciano Palonsky OH
- 17 Nicolás Méndez OH
- 18 Martín Ramos MB
- 19 Franco Massimino L

== Australia ==
The following is the Australia roster in the 2021 Men's Nations League.

Head coach: (Brazil) Marcos Miranda

- 1 Beau Graham MB
- 2 Arshdeep Dosanjh S
- 3 Steven Macdonald MB
- 7 James Weir MB
- 8 Trent O'Dea MB
- 11 Luke Perry L
- 12 Nehemiah Mote MB
- 15 Luke Smith OH
- 16 Thomas Douglas-Powell OH
- 21 Nicholas Butler S
- 27 Max Senica OH
- 28 Tim Taylor OH
- 29 Ethan Garrett OH
- 31 Matthew Aubrey OP
- 32 Elliot Azeez Oluwatobi OH
- 33 Sam Flowerday OH
- 34 Billy Greber L

== Brazil ==
The following is the Brazil roster in the 2021 Men's Nations League.

Head coach: (Brazil) Carlos Schwanke

- 1 Bruno Rezende S
- 3 João Rafael Ferreira OH
- 5 Maurício Borges Silva OH
- 6 Fernando Kreling S
- 8 Wallace de Souza OP
- 9 Yoandy Leal OH
- 11 Gabriel Kavalkievicz OH
- 12 Isac Santos MB
- 13 Maurício Souza MB
- 14 Douglas Souza OH
- 15 Maique Nascimento L
- 16 Lucas Saatkamp MB
- 17 Thales Hoss L
- 18 Ricardo Lucarelli OH
- 21 Alan Souza OP
- 23 Flávio Gualberto MB

== Bulgaria ==
The following is the Bulgaria roster in the 2021 Men's Nations League.

Head coach: (Italy) Silvano Prandi

- 1 Denis Karyagin OH
- 2 Stefan Chavdarov MB
- 3 Nikolay Kolev MB
- 4 Martin Atanasov OH
- 6 Vladimir Stankov S
- 9 Georgi Seganov S
- 10 Svetoslav Stankov S
- 11 Aleks Grozdanov MB
- 12 Georgi Petrov OH
- 14 Asparuh Asparuhov OH
- 15 Gordan Lyutskanov OH
- 16 Vladislav Ivanov L
- 19 Tsvetan Sokolov OP
- 22 Nikolay Kartev MB
- 24 Martin Ivanov L
- 25 Radoslav Parapunov OP
- 26 Svetoslav Ivanov OH

== Canada ==
The following is the Canada roster in the 2021 Men's Nations League.

Head coach: (Canada) Glenn Hoag

- 1 Tyler Sanders S
- 2 John Gordon Perrin OH
- 3 Steven Marshall OH
- 4 Nicholas Hoag OH
- 6 Jordan Pereira L
- 7 Stephen Maar OH
- 8 Jay Blankenau S
- 10 Ryan Sclater OP
- 11 Daniel Jansen Van Doorn MB
- 12 Lucas Van Berkel MB
- 13 Sharone Vernon-Evans OP
- 14 Eric Loeppky OH
- 17 Graham Vigrass MB
- 19 Blair Bann L
- 20 Arthur Szwarc MB
- 21 Brett Walsh S
- 23 Danny Demyanenko MB

== France ==
The following is the France roster in the 2021 Men's Nations League.

Head coach: (France) Laurent Tillie

- 1 Barthélémy Chinenyeze MB
- 2 Jenia Grebennikov L
- 4 Jean Patry OP
- 6 Benjamin Toniutti S
- 7 Kévin Tillie OH
- 8 Julien Lyneel OH
- 9 Earvin N'Gapeth OH
- 11 Antoine Brizard S
- 12 Stéphen Boyer OP
- 14 Nicolas Le Goff MB
- 16 Daryl Bultor MB
- 17 Trévor Clévenot OH
- 18 Thibault Rossard OH
- 19 Yacine Louati OH
- 20 Benjamin Diez L
- 21 Théo Faure OP
- 23 Léo Meyer S
- 24 Moussé Gueye MB

== Germany ==
The following is the Germany roster in the 2021 Men's Nations League.

Head coach: (Italy) Andrea Giani

- 1 Christian Fromm OH
- 3 Ruben Schott OH
- 5 Moritz Reichert OH
- 6 Denis Kaliberda OH
- 7 David Sossenheimer OH
- 8 Marcus Böhme MB
- 10 Julian Zenger L
- 13 Simon Hirsch OP
- 15 Noah Baxpöhler MB
- 16 Eric Burggräf S
- 17 Jan Zimmermann S
- 18 Florian Krage MB
- 19 Erik Röhrs OH
- 20 Linus Weber OP
- 21 Tobias Krick MB
- 25 Lukas Maase OP

== Iran ==
The following is the Iran roster in the 2021 Men's Nations League.

Head coach: (Russia) Vladimir Alekno

- 2 Milad Ebadipour OH
- 3 Reza Abedini MB
- 4 Saeid Marouf S
- 6 Mohammad Mousavi MB
- 7 Purya Fayazi OH
- 8 Mohammadreza Hazratpour L
- 9 Masoud Gholami MB
- 10 Amir Ghafour OP
- 11 Saber Kazemi OP
- 12 Morteza Sharifi OH
- 15 Ali Asghar Mojarrad MB
- 17 Meisam Salehi OH
- 18 Mohammad Taher Vadi S
- 21 Arman Salehi L
- 22 Amir Hossein Esfandiar OH
- 23 Bardia Saadat OP
- 24 Javad Karimi S

== Italy ==
The following is the Italy roster in the 2021 Men's Nations League.

Head coach: (Italy) Antonio Valentini

- 1 Davide Gardini OH
- 7 Fabio Balaso L
- 15 Riccardo Sbertoli S
- 18 Alessandro Michieletto OH
- 20 Gabriele Nelli OP
- 21 Luca Spirito S
- 23 Giulio Pinali OP
- 24 Oreste Cavuto OH
- 25 Marco Vitelli MB
- 26 Lorenzo Cortesia MB
- 27 Leonardo Scanferla L
- 28 Francesco Recine OH
- 29 Mattia Bottolo OH
- 30 Leandro Mosca MB
- 31 Filippo Federici L

== Japan ==
The following is the Japan roster in the 2021 Men's Nations League.

Head coach: (Japan) Yuichi Nakagaichi

- 1 Kunihiro Shimizu OP
- 2 Taishi Onodera MB
- 3 Naonobu Fujii S
- 4 Issei Otake OP
- 5 Tatsuya Fukuzawa OH
- 6 Akihiro Yamauchi MB
- 11 Yuji Nishida OP
- 12 Masahiro Sekita S
- 13 Masaki Oya S
- 14 Yūki Ishikawa OH
- 15 Haku Ri MB
- 16 Kentaro Takahashi MB
- 17 Kenta Takanashi OH
- 19 Tatsunori Otsuka OH
- 20 Tomohiro Yamamoto L
- 21 Ran Takahashi OH
- 24 Tomohiro Ogawa L

== Netherlands ==
The following is the Netherlands roster in the 2021 Men's Nations League.

Head coach: (Italy) Roberto Piazza

- 2 Wessel Keemink S
- 4 Thijs ter Horst OH
- 5 Luuc van der Ent MB
- 6 Just Dronkers L
- 7 Gijs Jorna OH
- 8 Fabian Plak MB
- 10 Maikel van Zeist MB
- 12 Bennie Tuinstra OH
- 13 Steven Ottevanger L
- 14 Nimir Abdel-Aziz OP
- 15 Gijs van Solkema S
- 17 Michael Parkinson MB
- 18 Robbert Andringa L
- 19 Freek de Weijer S
- 21 Stijn van Schie OH
- 22 Twan Wiltenburg MB
- 25 Stijn van Tilburg OH

== Poland ==
The following is the Poland roster in the 2021 Men's Nations League.

Head coach: (Belgium) Vital Heynen

- 1 Piotr Nowakowski MB
- 2 Maciej Muzaj OP
- 4 Marcin Komenda S
- 5 Łukasz Kaczmarek OP
- 6 Bartosz Kurek OP
- 9 Wilfredo León OH
- 10 Damian Wojtaszek L
- 11 Fabian Drzyzga S
- 12 Grzegorz Łomacz S
- 13 Michał Kubiak OH
- 14 Aleksander Śliwka OH
- 15 Jakub Kochanowski MB
- 16 Kamil Semeniuk OH
- 17 Paweł Zatorski L
- 20 Mateusz Bieniek MB
- 21 Tomasz Fornal OH
- 22 Bartosz Bednorz OH
- 77 Karol Kłos MB
- 99 Norbert Huber MB

== Russia ==
The following is the Russia roster in the 2021 Men's Nations League.

Head coach: (Finland) Tuomas Sammelvuo

- 1 Yaroslav Podlesnykh OH
- 2 Ilia Vlasov MB
- 4 Artem Volvich MB
- 6 Evgeny Baranov L
- 7 Dmitry Volkov OH
- 9 Ivan Iakovlev MB
- 10 Denis Bogdan OH
- 11 Pavel Pankov S
- 13 Dmitry Muserskiy MB
- 15 Viktor Poletaev OP
- 17 Maksim Mikhaylov OP
- 18 Egor Kliuka OH
- 20 Ilyas Kurkaev MB
- 24 Igor Kobzar S
- 27 Valentin Golubev L

== Serbia ==
The following is the Serbia roster in the 2021 Men's Nations League.

Head coach: (Serbia) Slobodan Kovač

- 2 Uroš Kovačević OH
- 3 Milorad Kapur L
- 6 Nikola Peković L
- 7 Petar Krsmanović MB
- 8 Marko Ivović OH
- 9 Nikola Jovović S
- 10 Miran Kujundžić OH
- 11 Aleksa Batak S
- 12 Pavle Perić OH
- 13 Stevan Simić MB
- 14 Aleksandar Atanasijević OP
- 16 Dražen Luburić OP
- 18 Marko Podraščanin MB
- 21 Vuk Todorović S
- 23 Božidar Vučićević OP
- 26 Davide Kovač OH

== Slovenia ==
The following is the Slovenia roster in the 2021 Men's Nations League.

Head coach: (Italy) Alberto Giuliani

- 1 Tonček Štern OP
- 2 Alen Pajenk MB
- 3 Gregor Pernuš S
- 4 Jan Kozamernik MB
- 5 Alen Šket OP
- 6 Mitja Gasparini OP
- 9 Dejan Vinčić S
- 10 Sašo Štalekar MB
- 11 Žiga Štern OH
- 12 Jan Klobučar L
- 13 Jani Kovačič L
- 15 Matic Videčnik MB
- 16 Gregor Ropret S
- 17 Tine Urnaut OH
- 18 Klemen Čebulj OH
- 19 Rok Možič OH

== United States ==
The following is the United States roster in the 2021 Men's Nations League.

Head coach: (United States) John Speraw

- 1 Matt Anderson OP
- 3 Taylor Sander OH
- 4 Jeffrey Jendryk MB
- 5 Kyle Ensing OP
- 6 Mitchell Stahl MB
- 7 Kawika Shoji S
- 8 Torey DeFalco OH
- 9 Jake Hanes OP
- 11 Micah Christenson S
- 12 Maxwell Holt MB
- 13 Benjamin Patch OP
- 15 Brenden Sander OH
- 16 Joshua Tuaniga S
- 17 Thomas Jaeschke OH
- 18 Garrett Muagututia OH
- 19 Taylor Averill MB
- 20 David Smith MB
- 21 Dustin Watten L
- 22 Erik Shoji L
