= Filippo Lanza =

Italian volleyball player (born 1991)

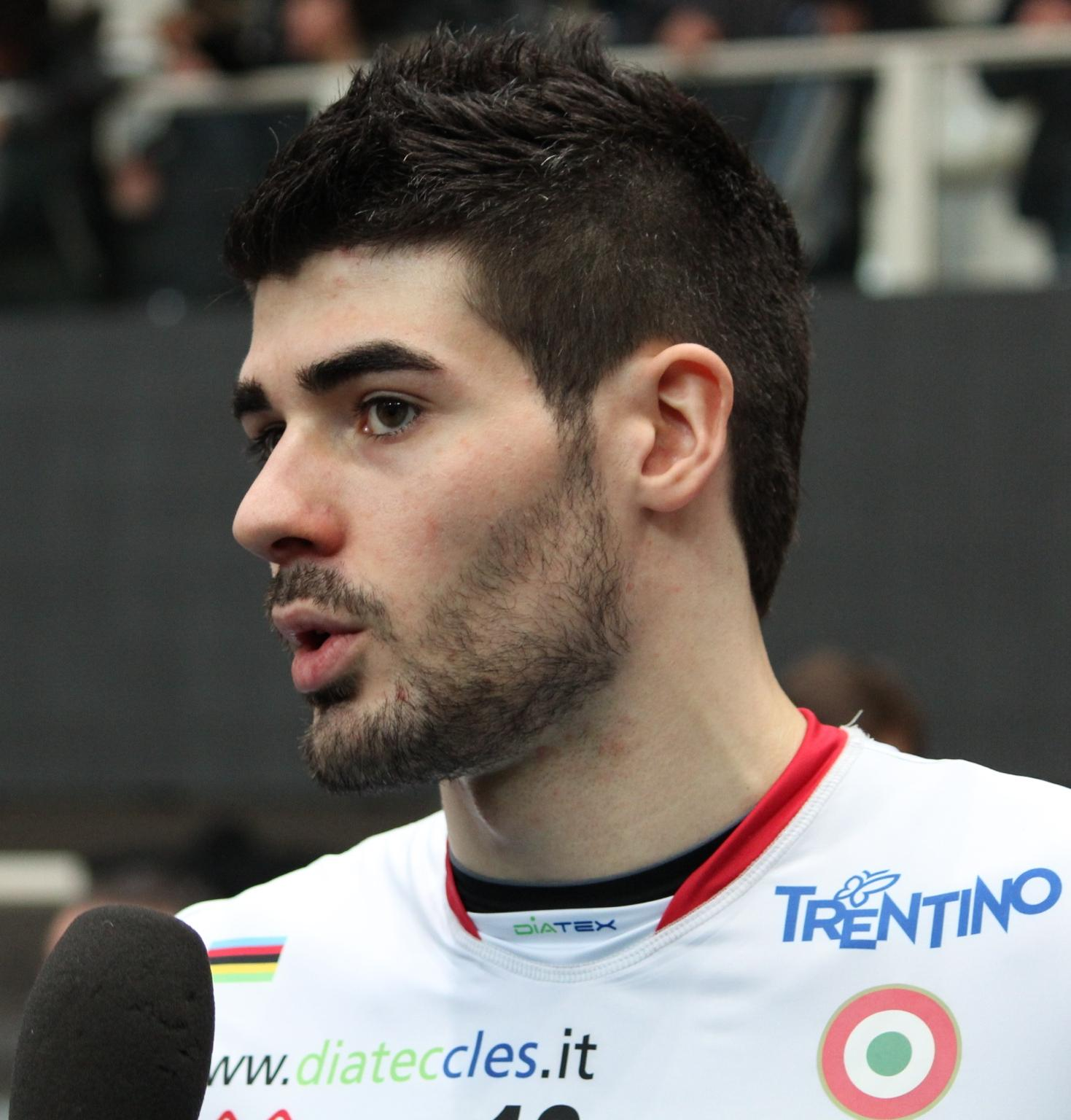

Personal information
- Born: 3 March 1991 (age 35); Zevio, Veneto, Italy
- Height: 1.96 m (6 ft 5 in)
- Weight: 96 kg (212 lb)
- Spike: 348 cm (137 in)
- Block: 335 cm (132 in)

Volleyball information
- Position: Outside hitter
- Current club: Prisma Volley
- Number: 91

Career
Years	Teams
2011–2018; 2018–2020; 2020–2021; 2021; 2021; 2022–2023; 2023–	Trentino Volley; Sir Safety Perugia; Vero Volley Monza; Chaumont VB 52; Top Volley Cisterna; Skra Bełchatów; Prisma Volley

National team
2012–2019	Italy
Honours
Men's volleyball
Representing Italy
Olympic Games
Olympic Games
Silver medal – second place	2016 Rio de Janeiro
FIVB World Cup
Silver medal – second place	2015 Japan
FIVB World Grand Champions Cup
Silver medal – second place	2017 Japan
Bronze medal – third place	2013 Japan
FIVB World League
Bronze medal – third place	2013 Mar del Plata
Bronze medal – third place	2014 Florence
CEV European Championship
Silver medal – second place	2013 Denmark/Poland
Bronze medal – third place	2015 Bulgaria/Italy

Filippo Lanza (born 3 March 1991) is an Italian professional volleyball player. He was a member of the Italy national team, with which he won a silver medal at the Olympic Games Rio 2016. At the professional club level, he plays for Gioiella Prisma Taranto.

== Honours ==
=== Club ===
- CEV Champions League
  - 2015–16 – with Trentino Volley
- FIVB Club World Championship
  - Doha 2012 – with Trentino Volley
- CEV Cup
  - 2014–15 – with Trentino Volley
  - 2016–17 – with Trentino Volley
- National championships
  - 2011–12 Italian SuperCup, with Trentino Volley
  - 2011–12 Italian Cup, with Trentino Volley
  - 2012–13 Italian Cup, with Trentino Volley
  - 2012–13 Italian Championship, with Trentino Volley
  - 2013–14 Italian SuperCup, with Trentino Volley
  - 2014–15 Italian Championship, with Trentino Volley
  - 2018–19 Italian Cup, with Sir Safety Conad Perugia
  - 2019–20 Italian SuperCup, with Sir Safety Conad Perugia
  - 2020–21 French Championship, with Chaumont VB 52

=== Individual awards ===
- 2013: FIVB World Grand Champions Cup – Best outside spiker
