= Jan Zimmermann (volleyball) =

German volleyball player (born 1993)

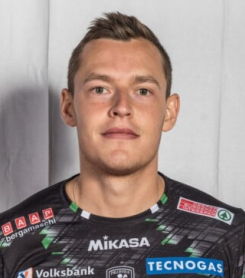
- Zimmermann in 2021

Personal information
- Born: 12 February 1993 (age 33); Tübingen, Germany
- Height: 1.90 m (6 ft 3 in)
- Weight: 83 kg (183 lb)
- Spike: 335 cm (132 in)
- Block: 315 cm (124 in)

Volleyball information
- Position: Setter
- Current club: ZAKSA Kędzierzyn-Koźle
- Number: 17

Career
Years	Teams
2012–2013; 2013–2015; 2015–2017; 2017–2018; 2018–2019; 2019–2020; 2020–2021; 2021–2022; 2022; 2022–2023; 2023–2024; 2024–2025; 2025–2026; 2026–	Olympia Berlin; VfB Friedrichshafen; United Volleys Rhein-Main; Stade Poitevin Poitiers; Berlin Recycling Volleys; Greenyard Maaseik; Sir Safety Perugia; Kioene Padova; BBTS Bielsko-Biała; Vero Volley Monza; Galatasaray; Prisma Volley; Vero Volley Monza; ZAKSA Kędzierzyn-Koźle

National team
2014–	Germany
Honours
Men's volleyball
Representing Germany
CEV European Championship
Silver medal – second place	2017 Poland
European Games
Gold medal – first place	2015 Azerbaijan

Jan Zimmermann (born 12 February 1993) is a German professional volleyball player who plays as a setter for ZAKSA Kędzierzyn-Koźle and the Germany national team.

== Career ==
For the 2023–24 season, he signed a contract with Galatasaray, one of the Turkish Men's Volleyball League teams.

== Honours ==
=== Club ===
- Domestic
  - 2013–14 German Cup, with VfB Friedrichshafen
  - 2014–15 German Championship, with VfB Friedrichshafen
  - 2014–15 German Cup, with VfB Friedrichshafen
  - 2018–19 Belgian Championship, with Greenyard Maaseik
  - 2020–21 Italian SuperCup, with Sir Safety Perugia
