= Riccardo Sbertoli =

Italian volleyball player (born 1998)

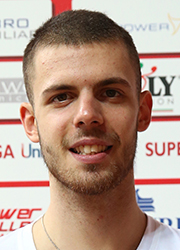
- Sbertoli in 2017

Personal information
- Nationality: Italian
- Born: 23 May 1998 (age 28) Milan, Italy

Sport
- Country: Italy
- Sport: Volleyball
- Club: Itas Trentino
Medal record
FIVB World Championship
Gold medal – first place	2022 Poland/Slovenia
Gold medal – first place	2025 Philippines
FIVB Nations League
Silver medal – second place	2025 Ningbo
CEV European Championship
Gold medal – first place	2021 Poland/Czechia/Estonia/Finland
Silver medal – second place	2023 Italy/Bulgaria/North Macedonia/Israel

Riccardo Sbertoli (born 23 May 1998) is an Italian professional volleyball player who plays as a setter for Lega Pallavolo Serie A club Itas Trentino, which he captains, and the Italy national team.

Riccardo Sbertoli's career began in 2011 in the Segrate youth team: in the 2012-13 season he won Serie B2 as well as Serie B1 with the same club. In the 2015-16 season, he was hired by Powervolley Milano in the Superlega, where he remained for six years and won a Challenge Cup. In the 2021-22 season he moved to Trentino, winning the 2021 Italian Super Cup and the 2022-23 championship.

== Sporting achievements ==
=== Clubs ===
- FIVB Club World Championship
  - Betim 2021 – with Itas Trentino
  - Betim 2022 – with Trentino Itas
- National championships
  - 2022/2023 Italian Cup, with Itas Trentino
  - 2022/2023 Italian Championship, with Itas Trentino
- CEV Champions League
  - 2023/2024 – with Itas Trentino
