= Luca Ulrich =

German-American soccer goalkeeper (born 2003)

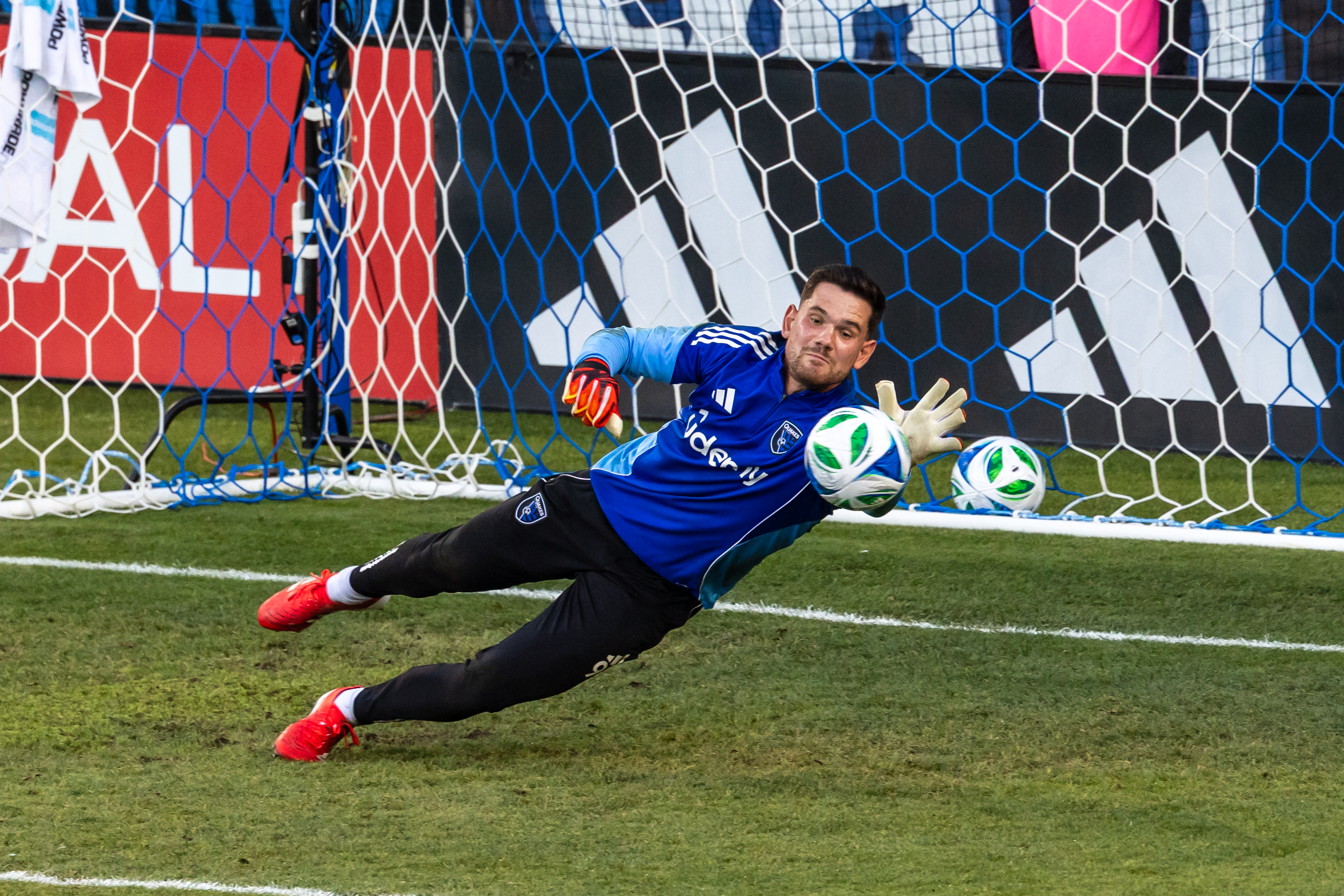

Personal information
- Full name: Luca Benjamin Ulrich
- Date of birth: March 17, 2003 (age 23)
- Place of birth: New York City, NY
- Height: 1.88 m (6 ft 2 in)
- Position: Goalkeeper

Team information
- Current team: IFK Lulea
- Number: 16

Youth career
- 2011–2019: Bethesda SC
- 2019–2020: D.C. United
- 2020–2021: Bethesda SC

College career
Years	Team	Apps	(Gls)
2021–2024	Georgetown Hoyas	18	(0)

Senior career*
Years	Team	Apps	(Gls)
2022–2023	Christos FC	11	(0)
2025	San Jose Earthquakes II	4	(0)
2025	San Jose Earthquakes	0	(0)
2026	IFK Luleå	12	(0)
- * Club domestic league appearances and goals

Luca Benjamin Ulrich (born March 17, 2003) is a German-American professional soccer player who plays as goalkeeper for Swedish side IFK Luleå.

== Early life ==
Ulrich was born in New York City and raised in Chevy Chase, Maryland. He began his youth soccer career with Bethesda Soccer Club, one of the leading development programs in the Mid-Atlantic region. He holds both German and American citizenships.

== College career ==
Ulrich attended Georgetown University, where he played for the Georgetown Hoyas from 2021 to 2024. During his tenure, Georgetown established itself as one of the top programs in the Big East Conference, winning multiple Big East regular season championships and Big East Tournament titles. The Hoyas also advanced to the NCAA College Cup, reaching the national semifinal (Final Four) during Ulrich’s collegiate career.

Ulrich was named a Big East All-Academic selection, reflecting his performance in both athletics and academics during his collegiate career.

== Professional career ==
After completing his collegiate career, Ulrich signed his first professional contract in 2025 with the San Jose Earthquakes MLS Next Pro affiliate The Town FC — the club's rebranded identity for the San Jose Earthquakes II. He made his professional debut on April 24, 2025, starting in goal against North Texas SC at Choctaw Stadium. Competing within Major League Soccer’s professional development structure, he was called up to MLS matchday rosters with the San Jose Earthquakes during his time with the organization.

Following the 2025 season, Ulrich joined Swedish club IFK Luleå, playing his home matches at Skogsvallen. He made his Swedish debut on May 6, 2026, starting in goal in a 5–1 away victory against Storfors AIK.
