= Pallavolo Padova =

Italian volleyball team

- Short name: Padova
- Founded: 1970
- Ground: Kioene Arena, Padua (Capacity: 3,916)
- Manager: Jacopo Cuttini
- League: Italian Volleyball League
- Website: Club home page

Uniforms
Home	Away

Former Antonveneta Padova is a professional volleyball team of Pallavolo Padova (until 1999 Petrarca Volley, until 2009 Sempre Volley), based in Padua, Italy. It plays in Italian Volleyball League. Since 2009 it is named Pallavolo Padova and it plays Italian SuperLega in 2016–2017, the highest level of Italian volleyball. It won a CEV Cup in 1994.

== Achievements ==
- CEV Cup / CEV Challenge Cup
  1994
  1988, 1989, 1992, 1993
  1991
- Italian Cup Serie A2
  2014

== Team ==
Team roster – season 2022/2023

No.	Name	Date of birth	Position
1	(Italy) Davide Gardini	February 11, 1999	Outside Hitter
3	(Italy) Andrea Canella	January 19, 1998	Middle Blocker
4	(Italy) Riccardo Cengia	July 10, 2001	Middle Blocker
7	(Italy) Francesco Zoppellari	May 27, 1997	Setter
8	(Italy) Davide Saitta	June 23, 1987	Setter
9	(Italy) Tommaso Guzzo	April 30, 2002	Opposite
10	(Italy) Marco Volpato	May 5, 1990	Middle Blocker
12	(Serbia) Dušan Petković	January 27, 1992	Opposite
13	(Germany) Julian Zenger	August 26, 1997	Libero
14	(Japan) Ran Takahashi	September 2, 2001	Outside Hitter
15	(Belgium) Mathijs Desmet	January 28, 2000	Outside Hitter
18	(Italy) Matteo Lelli	January 10, 1995	Libero
22	(Italy) Federico Crosato	May 22, 2002	Middle Blocker
88	(Bulgaria) Asparuh Asparuhov	July 28, 2000	Outside Hitter
Head coach: (Italy) Jacopo Cuttini

Team roster – season 2019/2020
1	(Italy) Alberto Polo	September 7, 1995	middle blocker
2	(Italy) Nicolò Bassanello	April 3, 1996	libero
6	(Italy) Fusaro Francesco	May 30, 1999	middle blocker
7	(Italy) Cottarelli Francesco	October 16, 1996	setter
9	(Argentina) Danani La Fuente Santiago	December 12, 1995	libero
10	(Italy) Volpato Marco	May 5, 1990	middle blocker
12	(Italy) Bottolo Mattia	January 3, 2000	outside hitter
13	(Italy) Dragan Travica	August 28, 1986	setter
14	(Japan) Yuki Ishikawa	December 11, 1995	outside hitter
17	(Italy) Casaro Nicolò	October 25, 1994	outside hitter
18	(Italy) Luigi Randazzo	April 30, 1994	outside hitter
19	(Cuba) Hernandez Ramos Fernando	September 11, 1989	outside hitter
21	(Canada) Barnes Ryley	October 11, 1993	outside hitter
Head coach: Valerio Baldovin; Assistant: Zappaterra Andrea

Team roster – season 2017/2018
Kioene Padova
No.	Name	Date of birth	Position
1	(Italy) Alberto Polo	September 7, 1995	middle blocker
2	(Italy) Nicolò Bassanello	April 3, 1996	libero
4	(Italy) Gabriele Nelli	December 4, 1993	outside hitter
5	(Italy) Milan Peslac	March 14, 1998	setter
6	(Italy) Stefano Gozzo	October 24, 1994	outside hitter
7	(Italy) Fabio Balaso	October 20, 1995	libero
8	(Serbia) Lazar Ćirović	February 26, 1992	outside hitter
9	(Italy) Matteo Sperandio	March 4, 1992	middle blocker
10	(Italy) Marco Volpato	May 5, 1990	middle blocker
11	(Italy) Leonardo Scanferla	December 4, 1998	outside hitter
12	(Serbia) Petar Premovic	September 12, 1994	outside hitter
13	(Italy) Dragan Travica	August 28, 1986	setter
15	(United States) Lucas Yoder	February 19, 1995	outside hitter
18	(Italy) Luigi Randazzo	April 30, 1994	outside hitter
Head coach: Valerio Baldovin; Assistant: Nicola Baldon

Team roster – season 2016/2017
Kioene Padova
No.	Name	Date of birth	Position
1	(Italy) Nicolò Bassanello	April 3, 1996	libero
3	(Italy) Francesco Zoppellari	May 27, 1997	setter
4	(United States) James Shaw	March 5, 1994	setter
6	(Italy) Stefano Giannotti	May 14, 1989	outside hitter
7	(Italy) Fabio Balaso	October 20, 1995	libero
10	(Canada) Stephen Maar	December 6, 1994	outside hitter
11	(Slovenia) Danijel Koncilja	September 4, 1990	middle blocker
12	(Italy) Marco Volpato	May 5, 1990	middle blocker
13	(United States) Taylor Averill	March 5, 1992	middle blocker
14	(Italy) Sebastiano Milan	April 6, 1995	outside hitter
15	(Sweden) Jacob Link	June 27, 1997	outside hitter
17	(Italy) Michele Fedrizzi	May 21, 1991	outside hitter
18	(Croatia) Filip Šestan	June 6, 1995	setter
Head coach: Valerio Baldovin; Assistant: Nicola Baldon
