= Linus Weber =

German volleyball player (born 1999)

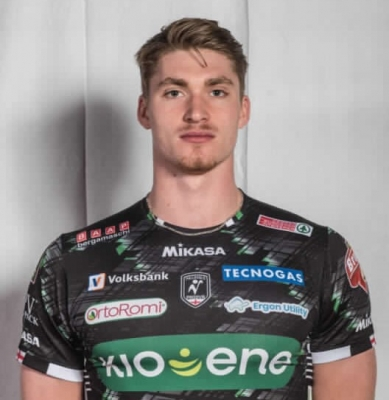
- Linus Weber as Kioene Padova player

Personal information
- Born: 1 November 1999 (age 26); Gera, Germany
- Height: 2.01 m (6 ft 7 in)
- Weight: 100 kg (220 lb)
- Spike: 360 cm (142 in)
- Block: 345 cm (136 in)

Volleyball information
- Position: Opposite
- Current club: Uijeongbu KB Insurance Stars
- Number: 20

Career
Years	Teams
2018–2019; 2019–2020; 2020–2021; 2021–2022; 2022; 2022–2026; 2026–	Berlin Recycling Volleys; Allianz Milano; VfB Friedrichshafen; Kioene Padova; Al Rayyan; Projekt Warsaw; Uijeongbu KB Insurance Stars

National team
Germany
Honours
Men's volleyball
Representing Germany
CEV European Championship
Silver medal – second place	2017 Poland

Linus Weber (born 1 November 1999) is a German professional volleyball player who plays as an opposite spiker for Uijeongbu KB Insurance Stars and the Germany national team.

== Honours ==
=== Club ===
- CEV Challenge Cup
  - 2023–24 – with Projekt Warsaw
- Domestic
  - 2018–19 German Championship, with Berlin Recycling Volleys
