= Davide Kovač =

Serbian volleyball player (born 1999)

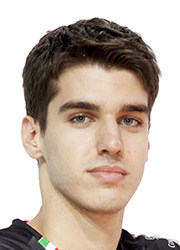

Personal information
- Nationality: Serbian
- Born: 19 November 1999 (age 26); Taranto
- Height: 1.99 cm (1 in)
- Weight: 82 kg (181 lb)
- Spike: 355 cm (140 in)
- Block: 335 cm (132 in)

Volleyball information
- Position: Outside hitter
- Current club: (Bulgaria) Dobrudja 07 Dobrich
- Number: 4

Career
Years	Teams
2016-2017; 2017-2018; 2018; 2019	(Serbia) OK Partizan Belgrad (Serbia) OK Niš (Italy) BCC Castellana Grotte (Bulgaria) Dobrudja 07 Dobrich

National team
2021-	Serbia
Medal record
U21 Balkan Championship 2018 MVP

Davide Kovač (born 19 November 1999) is a Serbian volleyball player, a member of the Bulgarian club Dobrudja 07 Dobrich.

His father is Slobodan Kovač, a former volleyball player and coach for several years.
