= Arshdeep Dosanjh =

Australian volleyball player (born 1996)

Personal information
- Full name: Arshdeep Singh Dosanjh
- Nickname: Arash
- Nationality: Australian
- Born: 30 July 1996 (age 30); Manly, Australia
- Hometown: Sydney, Australia
- Height: 2.05 m (6 ft 9 in)
- Weight: 98 kg (216 lb)
- Spike: 340 cm (134 in)
- Block: 330 cm (130 in)

Volleyball information
- Position: Setter
- Current club: BBTS Bielsko-Biała
- Number: 1

Career
Years	Teams
2014–2017; 2017–2018; 2018–2020; 2020–2021; 2021; 2021; 2021–2022; 2022–2023; 2023–2023; 2023-2024	Team Lakkapää; Chênois Genève; Warta Zawiercie; Qatar SC; Grand Nancy VB; Afyon Belediye Yüntaş; Prisma Volley; Berlin Recycling Volleys; BBTS Bielsko-Biała; NOVA Novokuybyshevsk

National team
Australia
Honours
Men's volleyball
Representing Australia
AVC Asian Championship
Silver medal – second place	2019 Iran

Arshdeep Singh Dosanjh (born 30 July 1996) is an Australian professional volleyball player. He is a member of the Australia national team. During his career, he has played in the top professional leagues in the world including Italy, Poland, Russia and has represented Australia in major international competitions. At the professional club level, he plays for Samsung Bluefangs in Korea.
