= PalaCivitanova =

Sports arena in Civitanova Marche, Italy

- Eurosuole Forum
- Interactive map of PalaCivitanova
- Address: Civitanova Marche; Italy
- Coordinates: 43°17′42.21″N 13°42′00.4″E
- Capacity: 4,200

Construction
- Opened: 2015
- Cost: €7.5 million

The PalaCivitanova, known for sponsorship reasons as Eurosuole Forum, is an arena in the municipality of Civitanova Marche, in the province of Macerata.

== History ==
The idea of building an arena in Civitanova Marche originated in the early 1980s; however, construction work only began in September 2014 and was completed in January 2015, with the inauguration taking place on January 16, one 135 days after the laying of the first stone. Thirty-one companies worked on the construction for a total of 153 employees and the costs were around 7,500,000 euros, 150,000 of which were paid by the residents of Civitanova Marche.
