= Lorenzo Cortesia =

Italian volleyball player (born 1999)

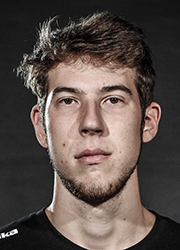

Personal information
- National team: Italy
- Born: 26 July 1999 (age 26) Verona, Italy
- Height: 2.02 m (6 ft 8 in)

Sport
- Sport: Volleyball
- Club: Verona Volley
Medal record
Men's volleyball
Representing Italy
European Championship
Gold medal – first place	2021 Poland/Czechia/Estonia/Finland
World University Games
Gold medal – first place	2021 Chengdu

Lorenzo Cortesia (born 26 July 1999) is an Italian volleyball player who won the 2021 European Championship.
