= Luigi Randazzo =

Italian volleyball player (born 1994)

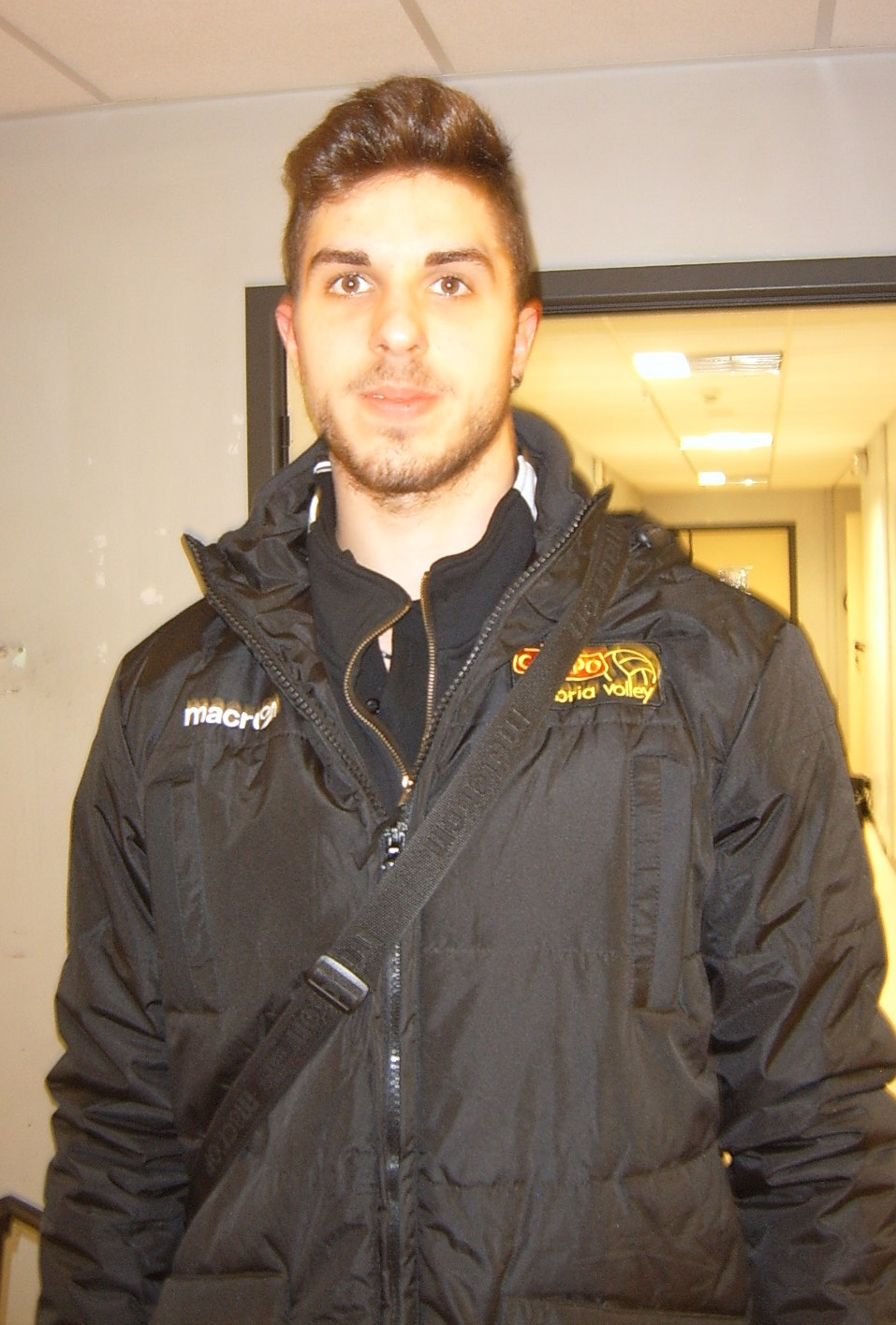
- Randazzo in 2014

Personal information
- Nationality: Italian
- Born: 30 April 1994 (age 32); Catania, Italy
- Height: 2.00 m (6 ft 7 in)
- Weight: 97 kg (214 lb)
- Spike: 339 cm (133 in)
- Block: 310 cm (122 in)

Volleyball information
- Position: Outside spiker
- Current club: El Ahly
- Number: 18

Career
Teams
| | Altotevere Città di Castello; BluVolley Verona |

National team
| 2015–2018 | Italy |
Honours
World Grand Champions Cup
| Silver medal – second place | 2017 Japan |
Junior European Championship
| Gold medal – first place | 2012 Poland/Denmark |

Luigi Randazzo (born 30 April 1994) is an Italian male volleyball player. He is part of the Italy men's national volleyball team. On club level he plays for El Ahly.

== Championship ==
Luigi Randazzo took part to the FIVB Volleyball Men's World Championship, in which the Italian national team arrived fifth.
