= Aimone Alletti =

Italian volleyball player (born 1988)

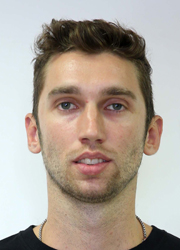

Personal information
- Nationality: Italian
- Born: 28 June 1988 (age 38)
- Hometown: Piacenza, Italy
- Height: 207 cm (6 ft 9 in)
- Weight: 90 kg (198 lb)
- Spike: 342 cm (135 in)
- Block: 310 cm (122 in)

Volleyball information
- Number: 24 (national team)

Career
Years	Teams
2015	Power Volley

National team
2015	Italy

Aimone Alletti (born 28 June 1988) is an Italian male volleyball player. He is part of the Italy men's national volleyball team. On club level, he plays for Power Volley.
