= Twan Wiltenburg =

Dutch volleyball player (born 1997)

Personal information
- Born: 20 January 1997 (age 29) Zevenhuizen, Netherlands
- Height: 2.03 m (6 ft 8 in)
- Weight: 86 kg (190 lb)
- Spike: 334 cm (131 in)
- Block: 325 cm (128 in)

Volleyball information
- Position: Middle blocker
- Current club: Narbonne Volley

Career
- Years: Team
- 2016–2019 2019–2021 2021 2021–2022 2022–2024 2024–: Orion Doetinchem; Lindemans Aalst; Tectum Achel; Top Volley Cisterna; ZAKSA Kędzierzyn-Koźle; Narbonne Volley

National team
- Years: Team
- –: Netherlands

Twan Wiltenburg (born 20 January 1997) is a Dutch professional volleyball player who plays as a middle blocker for Narbonne Volley and the Netherlands national team.

== Honours ==
=== Club ===
- CEV Champions League
  - 2022–23 – with ZAKSA Kędzierzyn-Koźle
- Domestic
  - 2016–17 Dutch Cup, with Orion Doetinchem
  - 2018–19 Dutch Championship, with Orion Doetinchem
  - 2022–23 Polish Cup, with ZAKSA Kędzierzyn-Koźle
  - 2023–24 Polish SuperCup, with ZAKSA Kędzierzyn-Koźle
