= Davide Saitta =

Italian volleyball player (born 1987)

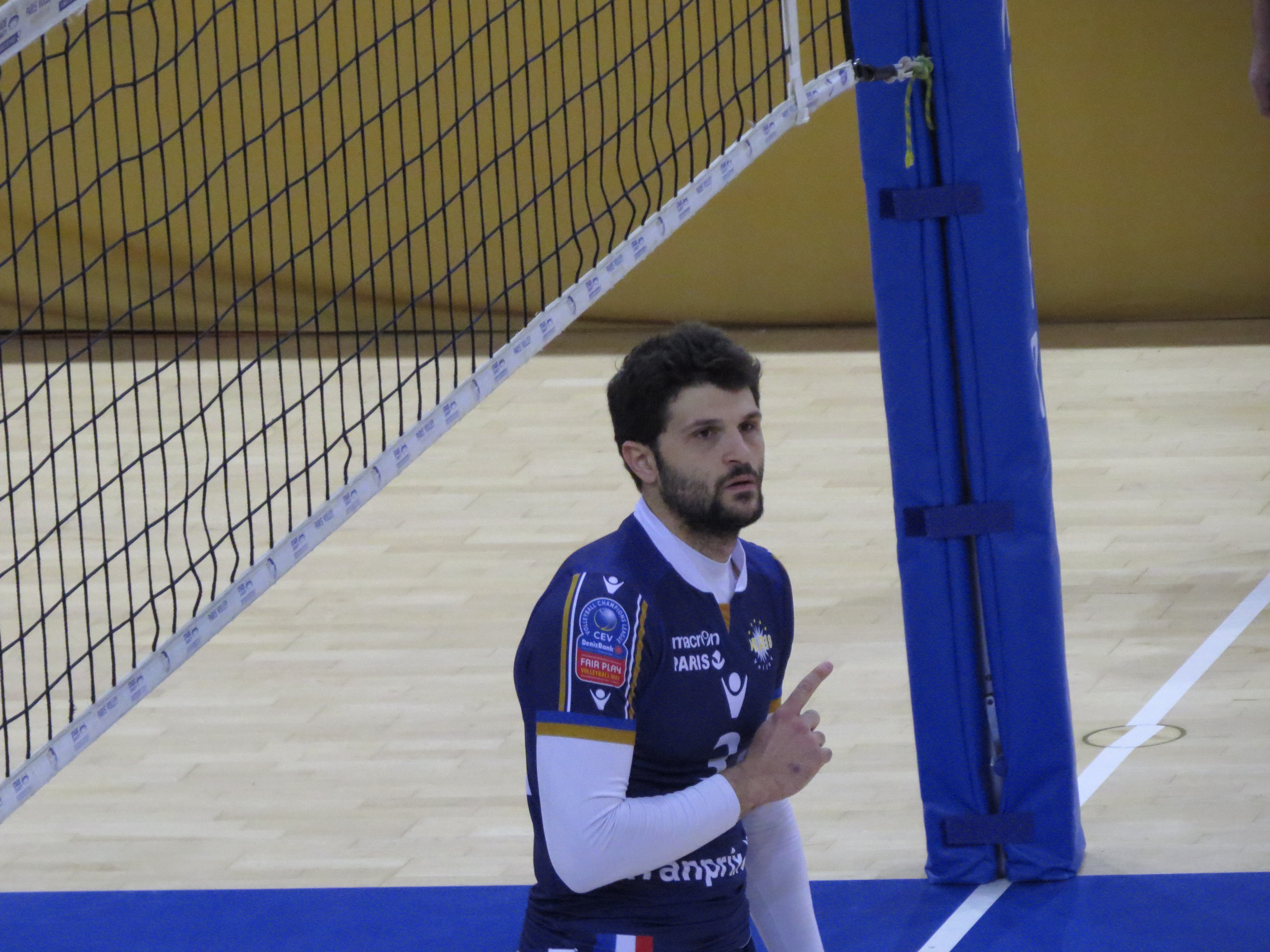
- Saitta in 2016

Personal information
- Nationality: Italian
- Born: 23 June 1987 (age 39)
- Height: 1.87 m (6 ft 2 in)
- Weight: 92 kg (203 lb)
- Spike: 320 cm (126 in)
- Block: 300 cm (118 in)

Volleyball information
- Position: Setter
- Number: 8

Career
| Years | Teams |
|---|---|
| 2011 | Al-Arabi |

National team
| 2013-2015 | Italy |
Medal record
Men's volleyball
Representing Italy
Mediterranean Games
| Gold medal – first place | 2009 Pescara | Team |

Davide Saitta (born 23 June 1987) is an Italian male volleyball player. With his club Al-Arabi, he competed at the 2011 FIVB Volleyball Men's Club World Championship.
