= Bardia Saadat =

Iranian volleyball player (born 2002)

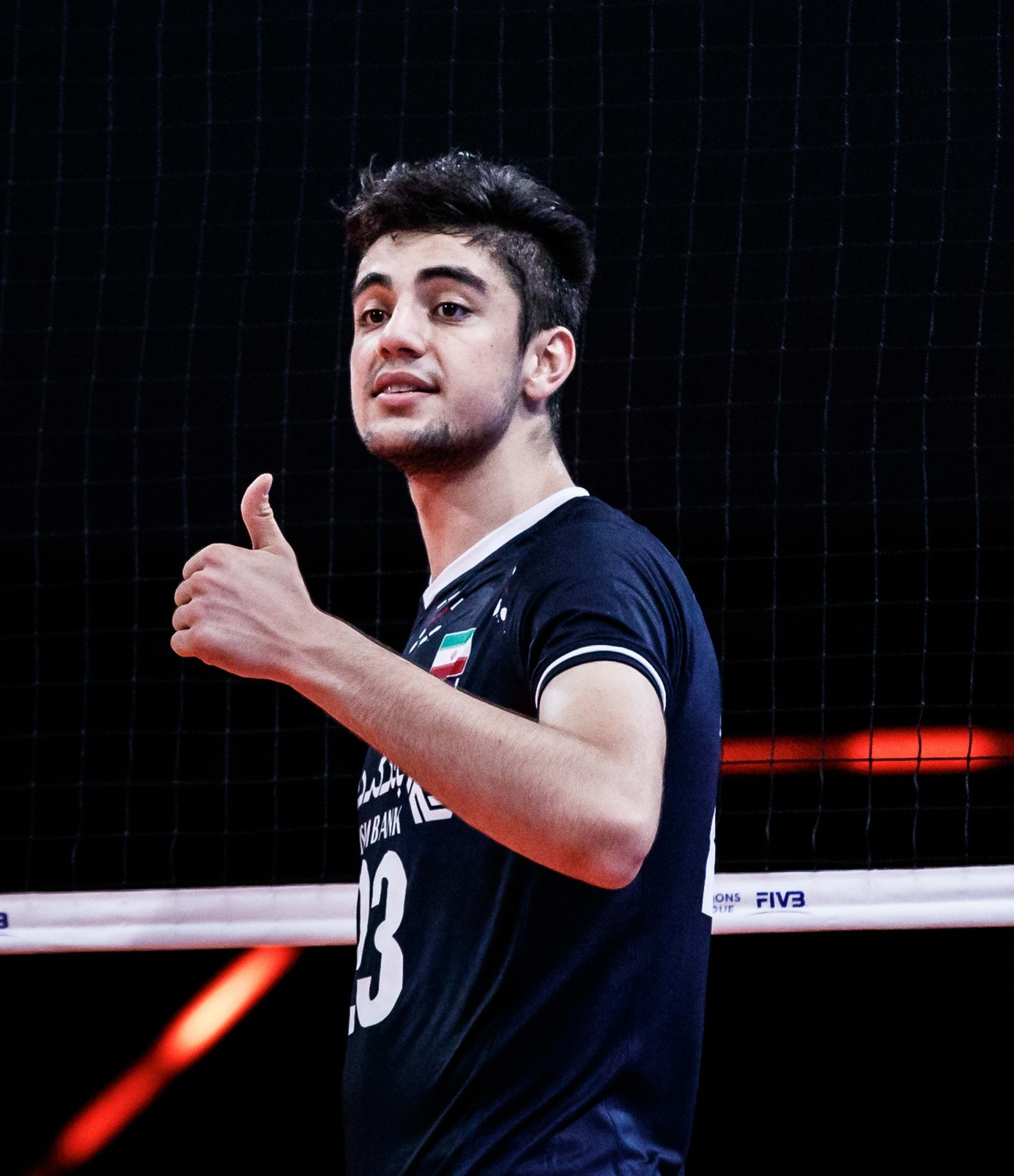

Personal information
- Full name: Bardia Saadat
- Born: 12 August 2002 (age 24); Urmia, Iran
- Height: 2.07 m (6 ft 9 in)
- Weight: 87 kg (192 lb)
- Spike: 3.55 m (140 in)
- Block: 3.28 m (129 in)

Volleyball information
- Position: Opposite spiker
- Current club: (Turkey) Alania Espur

Career
Years	Teams
2018–2019; 2019–2020; 2020–2021; 2021–	(Iran) Dorna Urmia (Iran) Khatam Ardakan (Serbia) OK Niš (Italy) Top Volley Cisterna

National team
2018–2019; 2019– 2021–	Iran U19; Iran U21; Iran
Honours
Men's volleyball
Representing Iran
Men's U21 World Championship
Gold medal – first place	2019 Riffa	Team
Islamic Solidarity Games
Gold medal – first place	2021 Konya	Team

Bardia Saadat (Persian: بردیا سعادت; born 12 August 2002 in Urmia) is an Iranian volleyball player who plays as an opposite spiker for the Iran national team and Italian club Top Volley Cisterna.

In 2021 Saadat invited to Iran senior national team by Vladimir Alekno and made his debut match against Russia in the 2021 Nations League.

== Honours ==
=== National team ===
- U21 World Championship
  - Gold medal (1): 2019
- Asian U18 Championship
  - Bronze medal (1): 2018

=== Individual ===
- Best opposite spiker: 2018 Asian Boys' U18 Championship
