= Prisma Volley =

Gioiella Prisma Taranto
- Full name: Gioiella Prisma Taranto
- Founded: 1997
- Ground: PalaMazzola, Taranto (Capacity: 5,000)
- Manager: Vincenzo Di Pinto
- League: Italian Volleyball League
- Website: Club home page

Uniforms
Home	Away

Gioiella Prisma Taranto is a professional Volleyball based in Taranto, Italy. It plays in Italian Volleyball League. It was created in 1997 under the name of Magna Grecia Volley, and now it is named Prisma Volley.

== History ==
A first club was founded in 1997, by the president Antonio Di Battista, that moved the Magna Grecia Volley franchise from Matera to Taranto. The team, with the classical red and blu jerseys, start its first championship in Serie A2, achieving the promotion to Serie A1 at the end of 1999-2000 season. The team played two years in the first division with the sponsor names La Cascina and Vini Borgocanale, before it went bankrupt. In 2002 the Magna Grecia Volley vice-president, Antonio Bongiovanni, founded the Taranto Volley. The team started from Serie D, won in 2003 and, in the summer of the same year, was acquired Belpasso (Serie A2) franchise. The return in the first division arrived in 2004 season, after the acquisition of Unimade Parma franchise. At the end of the year, the team come back to the second division. After a winning season (2005/2006), the team conquered, for the first time in its history, the playoff qualification in 2006/2007 season. At the same time, even the qualification to the Coppa Italia Final Four was reached. At the end of 2007/2008 championship, ended with the keeping of higher division, the club was moved from Taranto to Martina Franca, by management decision.

== Team ==
Team roster – season 2022/2023

No.	Name	Date of birth	Position
1	(Italy) Tommaso Stefani	4 May 2001 (age 25)	opposite
2	(Italy) Oleg Antonov	28 July 1988 (age 38)	outside hitter
3	(Italy) Giovanni Maria Gargiulo	3 June 1999 (age 27)	middle blocker
4	(Italy) Aimone Alletti	28 June 1988 (age 38)	middle blocker
5	(Italy) Marco Falaschi	18 September 1987 (age 39)	setter
6	(Italy) Marco Rizzo	2 January 1990 (age 36)	libero
7	(Italy) Manuele Lucconi	9 February 1999 (age 27)	opposite
8	(Canada) Eric Loeppky	1 August 1998 (age 28)	outside hitter
9	(Sweden) Hampus Ekstrand	28 October 2003 (age 22)	opposite
10	(Italy) Jacopo Larizza	22 August 1998 (age 28)	middle blocker
13	(Greece) Charalampos Andreopoulos	23 January 2001 (age 25)	outside hitter
14	(Italy) Francesco Pierri	14 September 1999 (age 27)	libero
18	(Italy) Francesco Cottarelli	16 October 1996 (age 29)	setter
Head coach: (Italy) Vincenzo Di Pinto

Team roster – season 2008/2009
Number	Name	Height (m)	Date of birth	Position	Nationality
1	Antonio Ricciardello	1,88	27/07/86	Libero	Italy
2	Manuel Coscione	1,88	29/01/80	Setter	Italy
3	Josè Luis Moltò	2,06	29/06/75	Middle blocker	Spain
6	Matej Černič	1,94	13/09/78	Outside hitter	Italy
9	Francesco Guglielmi	1,91	22/04/72	Libero	Italy
10	Milos Stoijkovic	2,00	17/05/87	Outside hitter	Serbia
11	Luigi Mastrangelo	2,02	17/08/75	middle Hitter/Blocker	Italy
12	Francesco Corsini	2,02	01/01/79	Opposite	Italy
13	Valdir Sequeira	1,95	22/11/81	Outside hitter	Portugal
14	Davide Quartarone	1,96	29/04/86	Setter	Italy
15	Bruno Augusto Furtado	1,96	25/07/78	Outside hitter	Brazil
18	Israel Rodriguez	1,94	27/08/81	Outside hitter	Spain
