= 2022–23 SuperLega =

Italian volleyball season

- Association: Federazione Italiana Pallavolo
- League: Italian Volleyball League
- Sport: Men's volleyball
- Duration: 1 October 2022 – 17 May 2023
- Games: 190
- Teams: 12
- Total attendance: 505021
- TV partner(s): Rai Sport; Volleyball World TV

Regular season
- Top seed: Sir Safety Susa Perugia
- Top scorer: (Turkey) Adis Lagumdzija (Valsa Group Modena) – 419 pts.
- Relegated to Serie A2: Emma Villas Aubay Siena

Cup
- Super Cup champions: Sir Safety Susa Perugia
- Super Cup runners-up: Cucine Lube Civitanova
- Italian Cup champions: Gas Sales Bluenergy Piacenza
- Italian Cup runners-up: Itas Trentino

Final
- Champions: Itas Trentino
- Runners-up: Cucine Lube Civitanova
- Finals MVP: (Bulgaria) Matey Kaziyski

Italian Volleyball League seasons
- ← 2021–22 2023–24 →

The SuperLega Credem Banca 2022–23 was the 78th season of the highest tier domestic division in the Italian Men's Volleyball League system since establishment in 1946. The league organized under the supervision of Federazione Italiana Pallavolo. The season started on 1 October 2022.

Conad Reggio Emilia was supposed to be promoted to SuperLega after winning the 2021–22 Serie A2 but their home arena failed to meet the standard of SuperLega. Hence, Emma Villas Aubay Siena was promoted to SuperLega instead.

Itas Trentino defeated Cucine Lube Civitanova and won the three games of the best-of-five series of the final to reclaimed the SuperLega title after eight years. Matey Kaziyski named as the MVP of the final.

== Format ==
The Lega Pallavolo SuperLega Credem Banca is Italy's top men's league. Twelve clubs participated in the 2022–23 league, which is split into two phases.

=== Regular season ===
The first phase, also known as the Regular Season, runs from October 2022 to March 2023 and features two legs, with each club playing in a double round robin system with home-and-away fixtures. The bottom ranked team relegated to Serie A2 next season.

=== Playoffs ===
5th place

At the end of the regular season, the ranked 9th–11th teams play in a double round robin system. The quarterfinals loser teams and the winner of 5th place preliminaries play in a round robin system with top 4 teams qualified to semifinals. Semifinals and finals play in a single elimination system.

Championship

At the end of the regular season, the top eight teams directly advance to the quarterfinals in the Championship play–offs with the classic pairing system (1st vs 8th, 2nd vs 7th, 3rd vs 6th and 4th vs 5th). Quarterfinals, semifinals, 3rd place match and final will play in a best-of-five series. The top three teams in the final standing as per the Teams Ranking System (including result of the regular season) qualified for the 2023–24 CEV Champions League while 4th place team qualified for the 2023–24 CEV Cup and 5th place team qualified for the 2023–24 CEV Challenge Cup.

== Teams ==
2022–23 SuperLega Teams
Team		Stadium	Capacity	Map
MIL	Allianz Milano	Allianz Cloud Arena	5,420	2022–23 SuperLega is located in Italy
CVA	Cucine Lube Civitanova	Eurosuole Forum	4,000	2022–23 SuperLega is located in Italy
PIA	Gas Sales Bluenergy Piacenza	PalaBanca	3,800	2022–23 SuperLega is located in Italy
TAR	Gioiella Prisma Taranto	PalaMazzola	3,100	2022–23 SuperLega is located in Italy
TRE	Itas Trentino	BLM Group Arena	4,000	2022–23 SuperLega is located in Italy
PAD	Pallavolo Padova	Kioene Arena	3,400	2022–23 SuperLega is located in Italy
PGA	Sir Safety Susa Perugia	Pala Barton	5,500	2022–23 SuperLega is located in Italy
CIS	Top Volley Cisterna	Palasport	3,000	2022–23 SuperLega is located in Italy
MOD	Valsa Group Modena	PalaPanini	3,000	2022–23 SuperLega is located in Italy
MZA	Vero Volley Monza	Arena di Monza	4,000	2022–23 SuperLega is located in Italy
VER	WithU Verona	AGSM Forum	5,200	2022–23 SuperLega is located in Italy
Promotion from Serie A2				2022–23 SuperLega is located in Italy
SIE	Emma Villas Aubay Siena	PalaEstra	5,500	2022–23 SuperLega is located in Italy

== Squads ==
In the current season rules, Each teams involved in the tournament were required to register 14-player roster must be selected in each match. There's no limit of foreign players in the each team’s roster but it must have at least 2 Italian players on the court at all times.

Allianz Milano
No.	Name	Date of birth	Position
2	(Cuba) Osniel Mergarejo	18 December 1997 (age 28)	outside hitter
3	(Puerto Rico) Klistan Lawrence	5 June 1983 (age 42)	opposite
5	(Italy) Federico Bonacchi	8 April 2004 (age 21)	setter
6	(Italy) Marco Vitelli	4 April 1996 (age 29)	middle blocker
7	(Italy) Francesco Fusaro	30 May 1999 (age 26)	middle blocker
8	(Argentina) Agustín Loser	12 October 1997 (age 28)	middle blocker
9	(France) Jean Patry	27 December 1996 (age 29)	opposite
11	(Italy) Matteo Piano (C)	24 October 1990 (age 35)	middle blocker
14	(Japan) Yūki Ishikawa	11 December 1995 (age 30)	outside hitter
16	(Italy) Paolo Porro	27 October 2001 (age 24)	setter
17	(Italy) Luca Colombo	4 January 2004 (age 22)	libero
18	(Italy) Nicola Pesaresi	11 February 1991 (age 34)	libero
22	(Iran) Milad Ebadipour	17 October 1993 (age 32)	outside hitter
Head Coach:		(Italy) Roberto Piazza	
Assistant coach:		(Italy) Marco Camperi	

Cucine Lube Civitanova
No.	Name	Date of birth	Position
1	(Puerto Rico) Gabi García Fernández	8 January 1999 (age 27)	opposite
3	(Italy) Daniele Sottile	17 August 1979 (age 46)	setter
6	(Italy) Francesco D'Amico	9 October 1999 (age 26)	libero
7	(Italy) Fabio Balaso	20 October 1995 (age 30)	libero
9	(Italy) Ivan Zaytsev	2 October 1988 (age 37)	opposite
10	(France) Barthélémy Chinenyeze	28 February 1998 (age 27)	middle blocker
11	(Bulgaria) Aleksandar Nikolov	30 November 2003 (age 22)	outside hitter
12	(Italy) Enrico Diamantini	4 April 1993 (age 32)	middle blocker
13	(Italy) Mattia Gottardo	26 February 2001 (age 24)	outside hitter
15	(Argentina) Luciano De Cecco	2 June 1988 (age 37)	setter
17	(Italy) Simone Anzani	24 February 1992 (age 33)	middle blocker
21	(Italy) Mattia Bottolo	3 January 2000 (age 26)	outside hitter
23	(Cuba) Marlon Yant	23 May 2001 (age 24)	outside hitter
Head Coach:		(Italy) Gianlorenzo Blengini	
Assistant coach:		(Italy) Romano Giannini	

Emma Villas Aubay Siena
No.	Name	Date of birth	Position
1	(Italy) Giulio Pinali	2 April 1997 (age 28)	opposite
2	(Italy) Fabio Ricci	11 July 1994 (age 31)	middle blocker
3	(Netherlands) Maarten van Garderen	24 January 1990 (age 35)	outside hitter
4	(Serbia) Nemanja Petrić	28 July 1987 (age 38)	outside hitter
6	(Italy) Federico Bonami	29 September 1993 (age 32)	libero
7	(Italy) Giacomo Raffaelli	7 February 1995 (age 30)	outside hitter
8	(Italy) Omar Biglino	9 August 1995 (age 30)	middle blocker
9	(Italy) Riccardo Pinelli	17 February 1991 (age 34)	setter
10	(Argentina) Juan Ignacio Finoli	5 November 1991 (age 34)	setter
11	(Argentina) Federico Pereyra	19 June 1988 (age 37)	opposite
12	(France) Swan N'Gapeth	9 January 1992 (age 34)	outside hitter
13	(Italy) Filippo Pochini	13 December 1989 (age 36)	libero
14	(Italy) Alessio Fontani	20 June 2006 (age 19)	outside hitter
15	(Italy) Federico Pellegrini	29 July 2004 (age 21)	outside hitter
16	(Italy) Alessandro Augero	12 March 2007 (age 18)	middle blocker
18	(Italy) Daniele Mazzone	4 June 1992 (age 33)	middle blocker
Head Coach:		(Italy) Paolo Montagnani	

Gas Sales Bluenergy Piacenza
No.	Name	Date of birth	Position
1	(France) Luka Basic	29 January 1995 (age 30)	opposite
2	(Italy) Nicolò Hoffer	6 May 2000 (age 25)	libero
3	(Italy) Francesco Recine	7 February 1999 (age 26)	outside hitter
4	(Italy) Fabrizio Gironi	18 March 2000 (age 25)	outside hitter
5	(Cuba) Roamy Alonso	24 July 1997 (age 28)	middle blocker
6	(France) Antoine Brizard (C)	22 May 1994 (age 31)	setter
8	(Brazil) Ricardo Lucarelli	14 February 1992 (age 33)	outside hitter
9	(Brazil) Yoandy Leal	31 August 1988 (age 37)	outside hitter
10	(Italy) Leonardo Scanferla	4 December 1998 (age 27)	libero
12	(Italy) Enrico Cester	16 March 1988 (age 37)	middle blocker
13	(Cuba) Robertlandy Simón	11 June 1987 (age 38)	middle blocker
17	(Italy) Yuri Romanò	26 July 1997 (age 28)	opposite
18	(Italy) Edoardo Caneschi	26 January 1997 (age 28)	middle blocker
19	(Netherlands) Freek De Weijer	October 30, 1995 (age 30)	setter
Head Coach:		(Italy) Lorenzo Bernardi	
Assistant coach:		(Italy) Massimo Botti	

Gioiella Prisma Taranto
No.	Name	Date of birth	Position
1	(Italy) Tommaso Stefani	4 May 2001 (age 24)	opposite
2	(Italy) Oleg Antonov	28 July 1988 (age 37)	outside hitter
3	(Italy) Giovanni Maria Gargiulo	3 June 1999 (age 26)	middle blocker
4	(Italy) Aimone Alletti	28 June 1988 (age 37)	middle blocker
5	(Italy) Marco Falaschi	18 September 1987 (age 38)	setter
6	(Italy) Marco Rizzo	2 January 1990 (age 36)	libero
7	(Italy) Manuele Lucconi	9 February 1999 (age 26)	opposite
8	(Canada) Eric Loeppky	1 August 1998 (age 27)	outside hitter
9	(Sweden) Hampus Ekstrand	28 October 2003 (age 22)	opposite
10	(Italy) Jacopo Larizza	22 August 1998 (age 27)	middle blocker
13	(Greece) Charalampos Andreopoulos	23 January 2001 (age 24)	outside hitter
14	(Italy) Francesco Pierri	14 September 1999 (age 26)	libero
18	(Italy) Francesco Cottarelli	16 October 1996 (age 29)	setter
Head coach:		(Italy) Vincenzo Di Pinto	

Itas Trentino
No.	Name	Date of birth	Position
1	(Bulgaria) Matey Kaziyski (C)	23 September 1984 (age 41)	outside hitter
2	(Italy) Gabriele Nelli	4 December 1993 (age 32)	opposite
3	(Belgium) Wout D'Heer	26 April 2001 (age 24)	middle blocker
4	(Czech Republic) Donovan Džavoronok	23 July 1997 (age 28)	outside hitter
5	(Italy) Alessandro Michieletto	5 December 2001 (age 24)	outside hitter
6	(Italy) Riccardo Sbertoli	23 May 1998 (age 27)	setter
7	(Italy) Oreste Cavuto	5 December 1996 (age 29)	outside hitter
8	(Italy) Domenico Pace	2 October 2000 (age 25)	libero
10	(Italy) Martin Berger	3 April 2003 (age 22)	middle blocker
11	(Italy) Niccolò Depalma	9 November 2002 (age 23)	setter
13	(Italy) Gabriele Laurenzano	12 June 2003 (age 22)	libero
15	(Italy) Daniele Lavia	4 November 1999 (age 26)	outside hitter
18	(Serbia) Marko Podraščanin	29 August 1987 (age 38)	middle blocker
20	(Serbia) Srećko Lisinac	17 May 1992 (age 33)	middle blocker
Head coach:		(Italy) Angelo Lorenzetti	
Assistant coach:		(Italy) Francesco Petrella	

Pallavolo Padova
No.	Name	Date of birth	Position
1	(Italy) Davide Gardini	11 February 1999	outside hitter
3	(Italy) Andrea Canella	19 January 1998	middle blocker
4	(Italy) Riccardo Cengia	10 July 2001	middle blocker
7	(Italy) Francesco Zoppellari	27 May 1997	setter
8	(Italy) Davide Saitta	June 23, 1987	setter
9	(Italy) Tommaso Guzzo	30 April 2002	opposite
10	(Italy) Marco Volpato	5 May 1990	middle blocker
12	(Serbia) Dušan Petković	27 January 1992	opposite
13	(Germany) Julian Zenger	26 August 1997	libero
14	(Japan) Ran Takahashi	September 2, 2001	outside hitter
15	(Belgium) Mathijs Desmet	28 January 2000	outside hitter
18	(Italy) Matteo Lelli	10 January 1995	libero
22	(Italy) Federico Crosato	22 May 2002	middle blocker
88	(Bulgaria) Asparuh Asparuhov	28 July 2000	outside hitter
Head coach:		(Italy) Jacopo Cuttini	

Sir Safety Susa Perugia
No.	Name	Date of birth	Position
6	(Italy) Simone Giannelli	9 August 1996 (age 29)	setter
7	(Cuba) Jesús Herrera	4 April 1995 (age 30)	opposite
8	(Luxembourg) Kamil Rychlicki	1 November 1996 (age 29)	opposite
9	(Poland) Wilfredo León (C)	31 July 1993 (age 32)	outside hitter
10	(Italy) Alessandro Piccinelli	30 January 1997 (age 28)	libero
11	(Argentina) Sebastián Solé	12 June 1991 (age 34)	middle blocker
12	(Italy) Roberto Russo	23 February 1997 (age 28)	middle blocker
13	(Italy) Massimo Colaci	21 February 1985 (age 40)	libero
15	(Brazil) Flávio Gualberto	22 April 1993 (age 32)	middle blocker
16	(Poland) Kamil Semeniuk	16 July 1996 (age 29)	outside hitter
17	(Ukraine) Oleh Plotnytskyi	5 June 1997 (age 28)	outside hitter
20	(Slovenia) Gregor Ropret	1 March 1989 (age 36)	setter
21	(Cuba) Julio César Cardenas	4 September 2000 (age 25)	outside hitter
23	(Italy) Stefano Mengozzi	6 May 1985 (age 40)	middle blocker
Head coach:		(Italy) Andrea Anastasi	
Assistant coach:		(Italy) Carmine Fontana	

Top Volley Cisterna
No.	Name	Date of birth	Position
1	(Australia) Aidan Zingel	19 November 1990 (age 35)	middle blocker
4	(Argentina) Javier Martinez	27 February 1995 (age 30)	opposite hitter
5	(Italy) Damiano Catania	28 March 2001 (age 24)	libero
6	(Germany) Denis Kaliberda	24 June 1990 (age 35)	outside hitter
7	(Croatia) Marko Sedlaček	29 July 1996 (age 29)	outside hitter
8	(Italy) Michael Zanni	5 November 1998 (age 27)	setter
10	(Italy) Andrea Mattei	23 July 1993 (age 32)	middle blocker
11	(Croatia) Petar Đirlić	27 May 1997	opposite
13	(Italy) Andrea Rossi	14 February 1989	middle blocker
15	(Italy) Matteo Staforini	25 May 2003 (age 22)	libero
17	(Italy) Michele Baranowicz	5 August 1989	setter
20	(Turkey) Efe Bayram	1 March 2002 (age 23)	outside hitter
22	(Cuba) José Miguel Gutiérrez	27 October 2001 (age 24)	outside hitter
Head coach:		(Italy) Fabio Soli	
First assistant coach:		(Italy) Roberto Cocconi	
Second assistant coach:		(Italy) Elio Tommasino	

Valsa Group Modena
No.	Name	Date of birth	Position
1	(Brazil) Bruno Rezende (C)	2 July 1986 (age 39)	setter
3	(New Zealand) Lorenzo Pope	6 December 2001 (age 24)	outside hitter
5	(Italy) Riccardo Gollini	5 July 2000 (age 25)	libero
6	(Italy) Giovanni Sanguinetti	14 April 2000 (age 25)	middle blocker
7	(Serbia) Dragan Stanković	18 October 1985 (age 40)	middle blocker
9	(France) Earvin N'Gapeth	12 February 1991 (age 34)	outside hitter
10	(Italy) Lorenzo Sala	1 January 2002 (age 24)	opposite
11	(Germany) Tobias Krick	22 October 1998 (age 27)	middle blocker
12	(Turkey) Adis Lagumdzija	29 March 1999 (age 26)	opposite
15	(Italy) Elia Bossi	15 August 1994 (age 31)	middle blocker
16	(Italy) Nicola Salsi	13 September 1997 (age 28)	setter
21	(Italy) Salvatore Rossini	13 July 1986 (age 39)	libero
24	(Italy) Andrea Malvasi	23 June 2005 (age 20)	outside hitter
90	(Italy) Tommaso Rinaldi	9 November 2001 (age 24)	outside hitter
Head coach:		(Italy) Andrea Giani	
Assistant coach:		(Argentina) Sebastian Carotti	

Vero Volley Monza
No.	Name	Date of birth	Position
1	(Croatia) Petar Višić	11 February 1998 (age 27)	setter
2	(Finland) Luka Marttila	30 June 2003 (age 22)	outside hitter
3	(Italy) Matteo Pirazzoli	26 October 2000 (age 25)	libero
5	(Italy) Lorenzo Magliano	14 December 2005 (age 20)	outside hitter
6	(Brazil) Fernando Kreling	13 January 1996 (age 30)	setter
7	(Italy) Filippo Federici	26 December 2000 (age 25)	libero
8	(Canada) Stephen Maar	6 December 1994 (age 31)	outside hitter
9	(Germany) Georg Grozer	27 November 1984 (age 41)	opposite
11	(Italy) Gianluca Galassi	24 July 1997 (age 28)	middle blocker
12	(Cuba) Yosvany Hernandez	June 23, 1991 (age 34)	outside hitter
13	(Italy) Thomas Beretta	18 April 1990 (age 35)	middle blocker
15	(Belarus) Vlad Davyskiba	31 March 2001 (age 24)	outside hitter
17	(Germany) Jan Zimmermann	2 December 1993	setter
18	(Italy) Gabriele Di Martino	20 July 1997 (age 28)	middle blocker
31	(Canada) Arthur Szwarc	30 March 1995 (age 30)	opposite
Head coach:		(Italy) Massimo Eccheli	

WithU Verona
No.	Name	Date of birth	Position
1	(Italy) Lorenzo Cortesia	26 September 1999 (age 26)	middle blocker
2	(Canada) John Gordon Perrin	17 August 1989 (age 36)	outside hitter
3	(Italy) Giulio Magalini	14 August 2001 (age 24)	outside hitter
5	(Russia) Maksim Sapozhkov	15 November 2000 (age 25)	opposite
7	(Brazil) Raphael Vieira de Oliveira	14 June 1979 (age 46)	setter
9	(Mali) Noumory Keita	26 June 2001 (age 24)	outside hitter
11	(Bulgaria) Aleks Grozdanov	28 March 1998 (age 27)	middle blocker
12	(Denmark) Mads Kyed Jensen	24 April 1999 (age 26)	opposite
13	(Italy) Luca Spirito	30 October 1993 (age 32)	setter
15	(Italy) Pietro Bonisoli	11 February 2005 (age 20)	libero
18	(Italy) Leandro Mosca	5 September 2000 (age 25)	middle blocker
19	(Slovenia) Rok Možič	17 January 2002 (age 23)	outside hitter
20	(Italy) Marco Gaggini	7 April 2002 (age 23)	libero
21	(Italy) Andrea Zanotti	28 October 1997 (age 28)	middle blocker
Head coach:		(Bulgaria) Radostin Stoychev	
Assistant coach:		(Italy) Roberto Di Maio	

== Transfer players ==
Allianz Milano
Moving from	Moving to
(Cuba) Osniel Melgarejo (Chaumont VB 52); (Iran) Milad Ebadipour (PGE Skra Bełchatów); (Argentina) Agustín Loser (Tourcoing LM); (Puerto Rico) Klistan Lawrence (Long Beach State University); (Italy) Marco Vitelli (Pallavolo Padova); (Italy) Federico Bonacchi (Gamma Chimica Brugherio); (Italy) Luca Colombo (Gamma Chimica Brugherio); (Italy) Francesco Fusaro (HRK Motta di Livenza)	(United States) Thomas Jaeschke (Beijing BAIC Motor); (France) Barthélémy Chinenyeze (Cucine Lube Civitanova); (Switzerland) Jovan Djokic (Chênois Genève VB); (Italy) Yuri Romanò (Gas Sales Bluenergy Piacenza); (Italy) Leandro Mosca (WithU Verona Volley); (Italy) Matteo Staforini (Top Volley Cisterna); (Italy) Nicola Daldello (end of career); (Italy) Matteo Maiocchi (Kemas Lamipel Santa Croce)

Cucine Lube Civitanova
Moving from	Moving to
(Bulgaria) Aleksandar Nikolov (Long Beach State University); (France) Barthélémy Chinenyeze (Allianz Milano); (Italy) Mattia Bottolo; (Italy) Mattia Gottardo (Pallavolo Padova); (Italy) Francesco D’Amico (Agnelli Tipiesse Bergamo)	(Cuba) Roberlandy Simón; (Brazil) Ricardo Lucarelli (Gas Sales Bluenergy Piacenza); (Slovenia) Rok Jerončič (Saturnia Acicastello); (Italy) Osmany Juantorena (Shanghai Bright); (Italy) Jiří Kovář (Panathinaikos Ateny); (Italy) Andrea Marchisio (BCC Castellana Grotte)

Emma Villas Aubay Siena
Moving from	Moving to
(Serbia) Nemanja Petrić (Biełogorje Biełgorod); (Italy) Daniele Mazzone; (Netherlands) Maarten Van Garderen; (France) Swan N'Gapeth (Valsa Group Modena); (Argentina) Federico Pereyra (UPCN Vóley Club); (Argentina) Juan Ignacio Finoli (Agnelli Tipiesse Bergamo); (Italy) Fabio Ricci (Sir Safety Susa Perugia); (Italy) Giulio Pinali (Itas Trentino); (Italy) Giacomo Raffaelli (Top Volley Cisterna); (Italy) Federico Bonami (WithU Verona Volley); (Italy) Filippo Pochini (Gioiella Prisma Taranto); (Italy) Omar Biglino (HRK Motta di Livenza)	(Italy) Simone Parodi (Banca Alpi Marittime Acqua S.Bernardo Cuneo); (Italy) Andrea Mattei; (Italy) Andrea Rossi (Top Volley Cisterna); (Italy) Samuel Onwuelo (Maury's Com Cavi Tuscania); (Italy) Giuseppe Ottaviani (Pool Libertas Cantù); (Italy) Rocco Panciocco (Cave Del Sole Lagonegro); (Italy) Marinfranco Agrusti (Aurispa Libellula Lecce); (Italy) Alessandro Sorgente (Maury's Com Cavi Tuscania); (Italy) Dario Iannaccone (Wow Green House Aversa); (Italy) Nicola Tupone; (Italy) Filippo Ciulli (no club yet)

Gas Sales Bluenergy Piacenza
Moving from	Moving to
(Brazil) Yoandy Leal (Valsa Group Modena); (Brazil) Ricardo Lucarelli; (Cuba) Robertlandy Simón (Cucine Lube Civitanova); (Cuba) Roamy Alonso (Chaumont VB 52); (France) Luka Basic (Montpellier HSC VB); (Netherlands) Freek de Weijer (AOP Kifissias); (Italy) Yurì Romanò (Allianz Milano); (Italy) Fabrizio Gironi (Gioiella Prisma Taranto); (Italy) Nicolò Hoffer (Cave Del Sole Lagonegro)	(United States) Aaron Russell (JT Thunders Hiroshima); (United States) Maxwell Holt (Beijing BAIC Motor); (Turkey) Adis Lagumdzija (Valsa Group Modena); (Slovenia) Tonček Štern (Olympiacos Piraeus); (France) Thibault Rossard (Asseco Resovia); (France) Pierre Pujol (BBTS Bielsko-Biała); (Italy) Oleg Antonow (Gioiella Prisma Taranto); (Italy) Damiano Catania (Top Volley Cisterna); (Italy) Alessandro Tondo (Tonno Callipo Calabria Vibo Valentia)

Gioiella Prisma Taranto
Moving from	Moving to
(Canada) Eric Loeppky (Pallavolo Padova); (Greece) Charalambos Andreopulos (Panathinaikos Ateny); (Sweden) Hampus Ekstrand (RIG Falköping); (Italy) Oleg Antonow (Gas Sales Bluenergy Piacenza); (Italy) Marco Rizzo; (Italy) Giovanni Maria Gargiulo (Tonno Callipo Calabria Vibo Valentia); (Italy) Jacopo Larizza (Agnelli Tipiesse Bergamo); (Italy) Manuele Lucconi; (Italy) Francesco Cottarelli (Sistemia Aci Castello); (Italy) Francesco Pierri (Leo Shoes Casarano)	(Australia) Arshdeep Dosanjh (Vero Volley Monza); (Latvia) Gustavs Freimanis (GFC Ajaccio VB); (Italy) Luigi Randazzo (Al-Ahly); (Italy) Giulio Sabbi (Shanghai Bright); (Italy) Gabriele Laurenzano (Itas Trentino); (Italy) Fabrizio Gironi (Gas Sales Bluenergy Piacenza); (Italy) Gabriele Di Martino (Vero Volley Monza); (Italy) Filippo Pochini (Emma Villas Aubay Siena)

Itas Trentino
Moving from	Moving to
(Czech Republic) Donovan Džavoronok (Vero Volley Monza); (Italy) Gabriele Nelli (Tonno Callipo Calabria Vibo Valentia); (Italy) Gabriele Laurenzano (Gioiella Prisma Taranto); (Italy) Domenico Pace (Kemas Lamipel Santa Croce); (Italy) Niccolò Depalma (UniTrento); (Italy) Martin Berger (Sport Team Südtirol Bolzano)	(Germany) Julian Zenger (Pallavolo Padova); (Italy) Giulio Pinali (Emma Villas Aubay Siena); (Italy) Daniele Albergati (Shedirpharma Massa Lubrense); (Italy) Lorenzo Sperotto (Conad Reggio Emilia); (Italy) Carlo De Angelis (Tinet Prata di Pordenone)

Pallavolo Padova
Moving from	Moving to
(Serbia) Dušan Petković (Projekt Warszawa); (Germany) Julian Zenger (Itas Trentino); (Bulgaria) Asparuh Asparuhov (WithU Verona Volley); (Belgium) Mathijs Desmet (Knack Roeselare); (Italy) Davide Gardini (BYU Cougars); (Italy) Davide Saitta (Tonno Callipo Calabria Vibo Valentia); (Italy) Matteo Lelli (TMB Monselice)	(Germany) Linus Weber (Projekt Warszawa); (Germany) Jan Zimmermann (BBTS Bielsko-Biała); (Canada) Eric Loeppky (Gioiella Prisma Taranto); (Bulgaria) Georgi Petrow (Neftochimik Burgas); (Italy) Marco Vitelli (Allianz Milano); (Italy) Mattia Bottolo; (Italy) Mattia Gottardo (Cucine Lube Civitanova); (Italy) Andrea Schiro (HRK Motta di Livenza); (Italy) Nicolò Bassanello (Volley Team San Donà di Piave)

Sir Safety Susa Perugia
Moving from	Moving to
(Poland) Kamil Semeniuk (Grupa Azoty ZAKSA Kędzierzyn-Koźle); (Brazil) Flávio Gualberto (Tonno Callipo Calabria Vibo Valentia); (Slovenia) Gregor Ropret (Cambrai Volley); (Cuba) Jesús Herrera Jaime (Chaumont VB 52); (Cuba) Julio César Cardenas (Tourcoing LM)	(United States) Matt Anderson (Zenit-Kazan); (Netherlands) Thijs ter Horst (Suwon KEPCO Vixtorm); (Latvia) Kristers Dardzans (Hurrikaani Loimaa); (Italy) Dragan Travica (Olympiacos Piraeus); (Italy) Fabio Ricci (Emma Villas Aubay Siena)

Top Volley Cisterna
Moving from	Moving to
(Turkey) Efe Bayram (Halkbank Ankara); (Croatia) Marko Sedlaček (Galatasaray HDI Sigorta); (Germany) Denis Kaliberda (Netzhoppers KW-Bestensee); (Cuba) José Miguel Guiterrez (Chaumont VB 52); (Italy) Andrea Rossi; (Italy) Andrea Mattei (Emma Villas Aubay Siena); (Italy) Damiano Catania (Gas Sales Bluenergy Piacenza); (Italy) Matteo Staforini (Allianz Milano); (Italy) Michael Zanni (Team Volley Portomaggiore); (Argentina) Javier Martinez (Avimecc Modica)	(Canada) Stephen Maar; (Canada) Arthur Szwarc (Vero Volley Monza); (Netherlands) Twan Wiltenburg (Grupa Azoty ZAKSA Kędzierzyn-Koźle); (Germany) Tobias Krick; (Italy) Tommaso Rinaldi; (Italy) Elia Bossi (Valsa Group Modena); (Italy) Giacomo Raffaelli (Emma Villas Aubay Siena); (Italy) Domenico Cavaccini (Domenico Cavaccini); (Italy) Lorenzo Giani (Consoli McDonald's Brescia); (Italy) Matteo Picchio (Pool Libertas Cantù)

Valsa Group Modena
Moving from	Moving to
(Turkey) Adis Lagumdzija (Gas Sales Bluenergy Piacenza); (Australia) Lorenzo Pope (Eastside Hawks VC); (Germany) Tobias Krick; (Italy) Tommaso Rinaldi; (Italy) Elia Bossi (Top Volley Cisterna)	(Brazil) Yoandy Leal (Gas Sales Bluenergy Piacenza); (Netherlands) Nimir Abdel-Aziz (Halkbank Ankara); (Netherlands) Maarten Van Garderen; (France) Swan N'Gapeth; (Italy) Daniele Mazzone (Emma Villas Aubay Siena)

Vero Volley Monza
Moving from	Moving to
(Brazil) Fernando Kreling (Sada Cruzeiro Vôlei); (Canada) Stephen Maar; (Canada) Arthur Szwarc (Top Volley Cisterna); (Croatia) Petar Višić (HAOK Mladost Zagrzeb); (Finland) Luka Marttila (Hurrikaani Loimaa); (Italy) Gabriele Di Martino (Gioiella Prisma Taranto); (Italy) Matteo Pirazzoli (Consar RCM Ravenna); (Germany) Jan Zimmermann (Note: Jan Zimmermann left Italy to play in Poland. He was called back to Vero Volley Monza to substitute Fernando Kreling due to his injury.) (BBTS Bielsko-Biała); (Cuba) Yosvany Hernandez (Beijing BAIC Motor)	(Czech Republic) Donovan Džavoronok (Itas Trentino); (Bulgaria) Aleks Grozdanov (WithU Verona Volley); (Bulgaria) Denis Karjagin (Grupa Azoty ZAKSA Kędzierzyn-Koźle); (Serbia) Milan Katić (Gazprom-Ugra Surgut); (Argentina) (Italy) Santiago Orduna (Tonno Callipo Calabria Vibo Valentia); (Italy) Tomasz Calligaro (end of career); (Italy) Marco Gaggini (WithU Verona Volley); (Italy) Alessandro Galliani (Pool Libertas Cantù)

WithU Volley
Moving from	Moving to
(Bulgaria) Aleks Grozdanov; (Italy) Marco Gaggini (Vero Volley Monza); (Canada) John Perrin (Szahdab Jazd); (Mali) Noumory Keita (Uijeongbu KB Insurance Stars); (Russia) Maksim Sapożkow (VC Yugra Nizhnevartovsk); (Italy) Leandro Mosca (Allianz Milano); (Italy) Pietro Bonisoli (Gamma Chimica Brugherio)	(Cameroon) Nathan Wounembaina (Chaumont Volley-Ball 52); (Bulgaria) Asparuh Asparuhov (Pallavolo Padova); (France) Jonas Aguenier (Pool Libertas Cantù); (Serbia) Uroš Nikolić (Stade Poitevin Poitiers); (Albania) Anton Qafarena (no club yet); (Italy) Federico Bonami (Emma Villas Aubay Siena); (Italy) Francesco Donati (Shedirpharma Massa Lubrense)

== Pool standing procedure ==
1. Highest number of result points, the teams will be ranked by the most point gained per match as follows:
  - Match won 3–0 or 3–1: 3 points for the winner, 0 points for the loser
  - Match won 3–2: 2 points for the winner, 1 point for the loser
  - Match forfeited: 3 points for the winner, 0 points (0–25, 0–25, 0–25) for the loser
2. In the event of a tie, the following first tiebreaker will apply: total number of victories (matches won, matches lost)
3. If teams are still tied after examining the most point gained and the number of victories, then will examine the results in order to break the tie in the following order:
  - Set quotient: if two or more teams are tied on the number of points gained, they will be ranked by the quotient resulting from the division of the number of all set won by the number of all sets lost.
  - Points quotient: if the tie persists based on the set quotient, the teams will be ranked by the quotient resulting from the division of all points scored by the total of points lost during all sets.
  - If the tie persists based on the point quotient, the tie will be broken based on the team that won the match of the Round Robin Phase between the tied teams. When the tie in point quotient is between three or more teams, these teams ranked taking into consideration only the matches involving the teams in question.

== Super Cup ==
Super Cup is the pre-season tournament, featuring the first title of Season 2022–23.

Sir Safety Susa Perugia won Super Cup and grabbed their first title of this season by defeating Cucine Lube Civitanova in a tie-break match.

Semifinals
31 October
Cucine Lube Civitanova	3
Valsa Group Modena	0
31 October
Sir Safety Conad Perugia	3
Itas Trentino	2

Final
1 December
Cucine Lube Civitanova	2
Sir Safety Conad Perugia	3
3rd place match
1 December
Itas Trentino	3
Valsa Group Modena	1

== Regular season ==
- All times are local, CEST (UTC+02:00) between 1 and 29 October 2022 and CET (UTC+01:00) from 30 October 2022.

=== League table ===
Pos	Team	Pld	W	L	Pts	SW	SL	SR	SPW	SPL	SPR	Qualification or relegation
1	Sir Safety Susa Perugia	22	22	0	65	66	11	6.000	1878	1550	1.212	Quarterfinals
2	Itas Trentino	22	14	8	44	54	32	1.688	2029	1873	1.083	Quarterfinals
3	Valsa Group Modena	22	12	10	40	47	38	1.237	1921	1905	1.008	Quarterfinals
4	Cucine Lube Civitanova	22	13	9	38	46	36	1.278	1838	1817	1.012	Quarterfinals
5	WithU Verona	22	14	8	37	47	39	1.205	1918	1882	1.019	Quarterfinals
6	Gas Sales Bluenergy Piacenza	22	11	11	34	45	43	1.047	1998	1961	1.019	Quarterfinals
7	Vero Volley Monza	22	11	11	33	40	43	0.930	1892	1897	0.997	Quarterfinals
8	Allianz Milano	22	10	12	30	38	45	0.844	1885	1884	1.001	Quarterfinals
9	Top Volley Cisterna	22	8	14	26	39	48	0.813	1950	1985	0.982	5th place play–offs
10	Pallavolo Padova	22	7	15	18	32	55	0.582	1819	2007	0.906	5th place play–offs
11	Gioiella Prisma Taranto	22	5	17	16	26	56	0.464	1802	1912	0.942	5th place play–offs
12	Emma Villas Aubay Siena	22	5	17	15	23	57	0.404	1668	1925	0.866	Relegated to Serie A2

Source: Standings SuperLega Credem Banca

=== Results table ===
Home \ Away	MIL	PIA	TRE	CVA	PAD	SIE	PGA	TAR	CIS	MOD	MZA	VER
Allianz Milano		2–3	2–3	1–3	3–1	3–0	0–3	3–0	0–3	3–1	1–3	0–3
Gas Sales Bluenergy Piacenza	3–1		3–1	2–3	3–1	1–3	1–3	3–2	3–0	3–0	1–3	2–3
Itas Trentino	1–3	1–3		2–3	3–0	3–1	2–3	3–0	3–2	3–0	3–0	3–0
Cucine Lube Civitanova	3–0	3–2	1–3		2–3	3–0	1–3	3–0	3–1	3–0	1–3	3–1
Pallavolo Padova	1–3	1–3	1–3	0–3		3–0	1–3	3–0	3–2	3–2	0–3	2–3
Emma Villas Aubay Siena	0–3	0–3	0–3	0–3	3–2		1–3	1–3	3–1	1–3	3–1	0–3
Sir Safety Susa Perugia	3–0	3–1	3–1	3–0	3–0	3–0		3–1	3–0	3–0	3–0	3–0
Gioiella Prisma Taranto	1–3	0–3	0–3	0–3	2–3	3–2	0–3		2–3	1–3	3–0	3–0
Top Volley Cisterna	3–1	3–0	3–2	3–0	3–1	1–3	1–3	3–0		1–3	1–3	2–3
Valsa Group Modena	2–3	3–1	1–3	3–0	3–0	3–1	1–3	3–1	3–0		2–3	3–1
Vero Volley Monza	2–3	3–1	0–3	3–0	2–3	3–0	0–3	3–1	3–2	1–3		1–3
WithU Verona	3–0	1–3	3–2	3–2	3–0	3–1	0–3	2–3	3–1	3–2	3–0	

Source: Results and Standings – Regular Season SuperLega Credem Banca
Legend: Blue = home team win; Red = away team win.

=== Fixtures and results ===
==== Leg 1 ====
Date	Time		Score		Set 1	Set 2	Set 3	Set 4	Set 5	Total	Report
Matchday 1
2 Oct	15:30	Sir Safety Susa Perugia	3–0	Vero Volley Monza	25–19	25–21	25–18			75–58	Report
2 Oct	18:00	Itas Trentino	3–1	Emma Villas Aubay Siena	25–16	25–21	23–25	25–17		98–79	Report
2 Oct	18:00	Allianz Milano	0–3	Top Volley Cisterna	22–25	19–25	23–25			64–75	Report
2 Oct	20:30	Gas Sales Bluenergy Piacenza	2–3	WithU Verona	20–25	25–23	25–23	20–25	22–24	112–120	Report
1 Oct	19:00	Gioiella Prisma Taranto	0–3	Cucine Lube Civitanova	23–25	23–25	21–25			67–75	Report
1 Oct	20:30	Pallavolo Padova	3–2	Valsa Group Modena	25–22	16–25	25–17	23–25	15–11	104–100	Report
Matchday 2
9 Oct	20:30	Cucine Lube Civitanova	2–3	Pallavolo Padova	23–25	25–20	20–25	25–16	12–15	105–101	Report
9 Oct	20:30	Valsa Group Modena	3–1	Gas Sales Bluenergy Piacenza	25–21	15–25	25–22	25–23		90–91	Report
8 Oct	18:00	Vero Volley Monza	2–3	Allianz Milano	25–23	25–23	20–25	23–25	11–15	104–111	Report
9 Oct	16:00	Top Volley Cisterna	3–0	Gioiella Prisma Taranto	25–20	25–16	28–26			78–62	Report
8 Oct	20:30	WithU Verona	3–2	Itas Trentino	23–25	27–25	25–20	28–30	17–15	120–115	Report
9 Oct	18:00	Emma Villas Aubay Siena	1–3	Sir Safety Susa Perugia	19–25	25–20	21–25	19–25		84–95	Report
Matchday 3
15 Oct	20:30	Sir Safety Susa Perugia	3–0	WithU Verona	25–22	25–14	25–20			75–56	Report
16 Oct	18:00	Cucine Lube Civitanova	3–0	Valsa Group Modena	25–21	25–13	25–19			75–53	Report
16 Oct	15:30	Allianz Milano	3–0	Emma Villas Aubay Siena	25–18	29–27	25–17			79–62	Report
16 Oct	20:30	Gas Sales Bluenergy Piacenza	3–1	Itas Trentino	23–25	25–18	25–22	25–22		98–87	Report
16 Oct	20:30	Top Volley Cisterna	3–1	Pallavolo Padova	25–19	31–33	25–25	25–15		106–92	Report
16 Oct	18:00	Gioiella Prisma Taranto	3–0	Vero Volley Monza	25–23	25–16	23–19			73–58	Report
Matchday 4
23 Oct	18:00	Itas Trentino	3–2	Top Volley Cisterna	20–25	25–18	35–33	21–25	15–13	116–114	Report
23 Oct	15:30	Valsa Group Modena	2–3	Allianz Milano	26–24	21–25	25–21	23–25	14–16	109–111	Report
23 Oct	18:00	Vero Volley Monza	3–0	Cucine Lube Civitanova	25–20	25–23	25–12			75–55	Report
22 Oct	18:00	WithU Verona	2–3	Gioiella Prisma Taranto	25–17	17–25	25–23	22–25	13–15	102–105	Report
23 Oct	18:00	Pallavolo Padova	1–3	Sir Safety Susa Perugia	25–21	12–25	19–25	18–25		74–96	Report
22 Oct	20:30	Emma Villas Aubay Siena	0–3	Gas Sales Bluenergy Piacenza	12–25	19–25	22–25			53–75	Report
Matchday 5
24 Nov	20:30	Sir Safety Susa Perugia	3–0	Valsa Group Modena	25–17	25–16	25–20			75–53	Report
20 Oct	20:30	Itas Trentino	2–3	Cucine Lube Civitanova	25–17	25–20	22–25	30–32	13–15	115–109	Report
30 Oct	18:00	Allianz Milano	0–3	WithU Verona	20–25	22–25	23–25			65–75	Report
30 Oct	15:30	Gas Sales Bluenergy Piacenza	1–3	Vero Volley Monza	23–25	25–18	24–26	18-25		90–69	Report
29 Oct	18:00	Top Volley Cisterna	1–3	Emma Villas Aubay Siena	25–21	23–25	25–27	25–27		98–100	Report
30 Oct	18:00	Gioiella Prisma Taranto	2–3	Pallavolo Padova	25–19	25–21	21–25	19–25	14–16	104–106	Report
Matchday 6
6 Nov	19:00	Sir Safety Susa Perugia	3–0	Allianz Milano	26–24	25–22	25–18			76–64	Report
6 Nov	18:00	Cucine Lube Civitanova	3–1	WithU Verona	16–25	26–24	25–21	26–24		93–94	Report
6 Nov	15:30	Valsa Group Modena	3–0	Top Volley Cisterna	25–15	25–19	25–20			75–54	Report
6 Nov	20:30	Vero Volley Monza	0–3	Itas Trentino	22–25	20–25	28–30			70–80	Report
5 Nov	20:30	Gioiella Prisma Taranto	0–3	Gas Sales Bluenergy Piacenza	16–25	19–25	23–25			58–75	Report
8 Dec	18:00	Pallavolo Padova	3–0	Emma Villas Aubay Siena	25–16	25–20	25–20			75–56	Report
Matchday 7
13 Nov	18:00	Itas Trentino	3–0	Gioiella Prisma Taranto	25–17	25–21	25–17			75–55	Report
12 Nov	18:00	Gas Sales Bluenergy Piacenza	1–3	Sir Safety Susa Perugia	25–21	25–22	22–25	25–22		97–90	Report
13 Nov	20:30	Top Volley Cisterna	3–0	Cucine Lube Civitanova	25–19	25–19	27–25			77–63	Report
13 Nov	20:30	WithU Verona	3–0	Vero Volley Monza	25–19	25–17	25–14			75–50	Report
13 Nov	15:30	Pallavolo Padova	1–3	Allianz Milano	30–28	23–25	19–25	18–25		90–103	Report
13 Nov	18:00	Emma Villas Aubay Siena	1–3	Valsa Group Modena	15–25	25–19	25–27	23–25		88–96	Report
Matchday 8
20 Nov	16:30	Sir Safety Susa Perugia	3–1	Itas Trentino	22–25	25–19	27–25	25–13		99–82	Report
21 Dec	20:30	Cucine Lube Civitanova	3–0	Emma Villas Aubay Siena	25–23	25–11	25–18			75–52	Report
20 Nov	20:30	Allianz Milano	2–3	Gas Sales Bluenergy Piacenza	18–25	25–21	25–23	22–25	13–15	103–109	Report
19 Nov	18:00	Vero Volley Monza	3–2	Top Volley Cisterna	21–25	25–18	26–28	25–18	15–11	112–100	Report
21 Nov	19:30	WithU Verona	3–0	Pallavolo Padova	25–21	25–17	25–21			75–59	Report
20 Nov	15:30	Gioiella Prisma Taranto	1–3	Valsa Group Modena	25–22	23–25	20–25	19–25		87–97	Report
Matchday 9
26 Nov	18:00	Itas Trentino	1–3	Allianz Milano	20–25	25–21	15–25	22–25		82–96	Report
27 Nov	18:00	Valsa Group Modena	3–1	WithU Verona	25–19	14–25	25–18	25–22		89–84	Report
27 Nov	18:00	Gas Sales Bluenergy Piacenza	2–3	Cucine Lube Civitanova	25–21	21–25	25–16	15–25	13–15	99–102	Report
27 Nov	18:00	Top Volley Cisterna	1–3	Sir Safety Susa Perugia	15–25	25–18	20–25	22–25		82–93	Report
27 Nov	20:30	Pallavolo Padova	0–3	Vero Volley Monza	16–25	23–25	21–25			60–75	Report
27 Nov	20:30	Emma Villas Aubay Siena	1–3	Gioiella Prisma Taranto	23–25	25–23	20–25	22–25		90–98	Report
Matchday 10
3 Dec	16:00	Sir Safety Susa Perugia	3–1	Gioiella Prisma Taranto	25–17	25–19	23–25	25–23		98–84	Report
3 Dec	18:00	Itas Trentino	3–0	Pallavolo Padova	25–15	25–16	25–21			75–52	Report
5 Dec	19:30	Allianz Milano	1–3	Cucine Lube Civitanova	21–25	25–22	22–25	21–25		89–97	Report
4 Dec	20:30	Gas Sales Bluenergy Piacenza	3–0	Top Volley Cisterna	25–22	25–19	25–23			75–64	Report
4 Dec	18:00	Vero Volley Monza	1–3	Valsa Group Modena	25–22	22–25	23–25	20–25		90–97	Report
4 Dec	18:00	WithU Verona	3–1	Emma Villas Aubay Siena	20–25	25–13	25–20	25–11		95–69	Report
Matchday 11
27 Oct	20:30	Cucine Lube Civitanova	1–3	Sir Safety Susa Perugia	25–20	25–27	18–25	19–25		87–97	Report
26 Oct	20:30	Valsa Group Modena	1–3	Itas Trentino	21–25	21–25	27–25	20–25		89–100	Report
10 Dec	17:00	Top Volley Cisterna	2–3	WithU Verona	13–25	25–23	25–20	20–25	13–15	96–108	Report
11 Dec	18:00	Gioiella Prisma Taranto	1–3	Allianz Milano	25–23	22–25	22–25	21–25		90–98	Report
11 Dec	18:00	Pallavolo Padova	1–3	Gas Sales Bluenergy Piacenza	24–26	17–25	25–21	20–25		86–97	Report
11 Dec	15:30	Emma Villas Aubay Siena	3–1	Vero Volley Monza	26–24	22–25	28–26	25–22		101–97	Report

==== Leg 2 ====
Date	Time		Score		Set 1	Set 2	Set 3	Set 4	Set 5	Total	Report
Matchday 12
18 Dec	18:00	Vero Volley Monza	0–3	Sir Safety Susa Perugia	19–25	22–25	20–25			61–75	Report
18 Dec	15:30	Emma Villas Aubay Siena	0–3	Itas Trentino	18–25	13–25	17–25			48–75	Report
18 Dec	18:00	Top Volley Cisterna	3–1	Allianz Milano	25–21	20–25	25–23	25–20		95–89	Report
18 Dec	18:00	WithU Verona	1–3	Gas Sales Bluenergy Piacenza	21–25	25–23	23–25	23–25		92–98	Report
18 Dec	18:00	Cucine Lube Civitanova	3–0	Top Volley Cisterna	25–20	25–22	35–33			85–75	Report
18 Dec	18:00	Valsa Group Modena	3–0	Pallavolo Padova	25–23	25–20	25–23			75–66	Report
Matchday 13
26 Dec	18:00	Pallavolo Padova	0–3	Cucine Lube Civitanova	22–25	14–25	17–25			53–75	Report
26 Dec	18:00	Gas Sales Bluenergy Piacenza	0–3	Valsa Group Modena	22–25	19–25	17–25			58–75	Report
26 Dec	18:00	Allianz Milano	1–3	Vero Volley Monza	18–25	22–25	25–22	22–25		87–97	Report
26 Dec	18:00	Gioiella Prisma Taranto	2–3	Top Volley Cisterna	25–13	25–19	24–26	23–25	13–15	110–98	Report
26 Dec	18:00	Itas Trentino	3–0	WithU Verona	25–13	25–13	25–16			75–42	Report
26 Dec	18:00	Sir Safety Susa Perugia	3–0	Emma Villas Aubay Siena	25–19	25–17	25–16			75–52	Report
Matchday 14
8 Jan	18:00	WithU Verona	0–3	Sir Safety Susa Perugia	17–25	17–25	16–25			50–75	Report
7 Jan	18:00	Valsa Group Modena	3–0	Cucine Lube Civitanova	25–16	25–21	25–19			75–56	Report
8 Jan	15:30	Itas Trentino	1–3	Gas Sales Bluenergy Piacenza	22–25	25–19	19–25	21–25		87–94	Report
8 Jan	18:00	Pallavolo Padova	3–2	Top Volley Cisterna	17–25	19–25	25–21	25–20	15–12	101–103	Report
8 Jan	20:30	Vero Volley Monza	3–1	Gioiella Prisma Taranto	25–23	22–25	27–25	30–28		104–101	Report
8 Jan	15:30	Emma Villas Aubay Siena	0–3	Allianz Milano	15–25	22–25	15–25			52–75	Report
Matchday 15
15 Jan	20:30	Top Volley Cisterna	3–2	Itas Trentino	25–21	25–22	24–26	35–37	15–13	124–119	Report
15 Jan	18:00	Allianz Milano	3–1	Valsa Group Modena	23–25	30–28	25–18	25–21		103–92	Report
15 Jan	15:30	Cucine Lube Civitanova	1–3	Vero Volley Monza	25–22	33–35	20–25	14–25		92–107	Report
14 Jan	18:00	Gioiella Prisma Taranto	3–0	WithU Verona	25–22	25–22	25–20			75–64	Report
15 Jan	18:00	Sir Safety Susa Perugia	3–0	Pallavolo Padova	25–22	25–21	25–21			75–64	Report
15 Jan	20:30	Gas Sales Bluenergy Piacenza	1–3	Emma Villas Aubay Siena	22–25	25–17	24–26	31–33		102–101	Report
Matchday 16
22 Jan	18:00	Valsa Group Modena	1–3	Sir Safety Susa Perugia	25–23	23–25	16–25	18–25		82–98	Report
21 Jan	18:00	Cucine Lube Civitanova	1–3	Itas Trentino	19–25	25–22	19–25	18–25		81–97	Report
22 Jan	15:30	WithU Verona	3–0	Allianz Milano	25–23	27–25	25–21			77–69	Report
21 Jan	18:00	Vero Volley Monza	3–1	Gas Sales Bluenergy Piacenza	22–25	27–25	25–20	25–15		99–85	Report
22 Jan	15:30	Emma Villas Aubay Siena	3–1	Top Volley Cisterna	22–25	25–19	25–22	25–18		97–84	Report
22 Jan	18:00	Pallavolo Padova	3–0	Gioiella Prisma Taranto	25–21	25–21	25–20			75–62	Report
Matchday 17
28 Jan	16:00	Allianz Milano	0–3	Sir Safety Susa Perugia	19–25	23–25	21–25			63–75	Report
29 Jan	18:00	WithU Verona	3–2	Cucine Lube Civitanova	25–22	25–22	20–25	20–25	15–12	105–106	Report
29 Jan	20:45	Top Volley Cisterna	1–3	Valsa Group Modena	22–25	23–25	25–20	23–25		93–95	Report
29 Jan	18:00	Itas Trentino	3–0	Vero Volley Monza	25–15	25–18	30–28			80–61	Report
29 Jan	18:00	Gas Sales Bluenergy Piacenza	3–2	Gioiella Prisma Taranto	29–27	25–21	20–25	23–25	9–15	106–113	Report
29 Jan	15:30	Emma Villas Aubay Siena	3–2	Pallavolo Padova	21–25	21–25	25–14	25–14	15–13	107–91	Report
Matchday 18
5 Feb	15:30	Gioiella Prisma Taranto	0–3	Itas Trentino	24–26	26–28	22–25			72–79	Report
4 Feb	18:00	Sir Safety Susa Perugia	3–1	Gas Sales Bluenergy Piacenza	22–25	25–22	25–21	25–17		97–85	Report
5 Feb	18:00	Cucine Lube Civitanova	3–1	Top Volley Cisterna	20–25	25–18	25–23	27–25		97–91	Report
5 Feb	16:00	Vero Volley Monza	1–3	WithU Verona	24–26	20–25	25–14	21–25		90–90	Report
5 Feb	17:00	Allianz Milano	3–1	Pallavolo Padova	25–18	23–25	25–20	25–19		98–82	Report
4 Feb	20:30	Valsa Group Modena	3–1	Emma Villas Aubay Siena	34–32	25–12	20–25	28–26		107–95	Report
Matchday 19
12 Feb	18:30	Itas Trentino	2–3	Sir Safety Susa Perugia	25–19	18–25	22–25	25–23	11–15	101–107	Report
25 Feb	20:00	Emma Villas Aubay Siena	0–3	Cucine Lube Civitanova	21–25	18–25	23–25			62–75	Report
11 Feb	15:30	Gas Sales Bluenergy Piacenza	3–1	Allianz Milano	27–25	25–18	18–25	25–19		95–87	Report
11 Feb	18:00	Top Volley Cisterna	1–3	Vero Volley Monza	25–20	23–25	23–25	22–25		93–95	Report
12 Feb	15:30	Pallavolo Padova	2–3	WithU Verona	21–25	22–25	25–20	29–27	17–19	114–116	Report
12 Feb	18:00	Valsa Group Modena	3–1	Gioiella Prisma Taranto	25–22	25–16	20–25	25–18		95–81	Report
Matchday 20
19 Feb	20:30	Allianz Milano	2–3	Itas Trentino	25–22	26–24	23–25	24–26	8–15	106–112	Report
19 Feb	18:00	WithU Verona	3–2	Valsa Group Modena	25–19	28–26	19–25	20–25	15–10	107–105	Report
19 Feb	18:00	Cucine Lube Civitanova	3–2	Gas Sales Bluenergy Piacenza	18–25	22–25	25–23	25–23	15–13	105–109	Report
18 Feb	15:30	Sir Safety Susa Perugia	3–0	Top Volley Cisterna	25–23	25–18	25–22			75–63	Report
19 Feb	18:00	Vero Volley Monza	2–3	Pallavolo Padova	24–26	25–17	25–17	20–25	13–15	107–100	Report
18 Feb	18:00	Gioiella Prisma Taranto	3–2	Emma Villas Aubay Siena	25–15	23–25	25–22	23–25	15–10	111–97	Report
Matchday 21
5 Mar	18:00	Gioiella Prisma Taranto	0–3	Sir Safety Susa Perugia	22–25	19–25	19–25			60–75	Report
5 Mar	18:00	Pallavolo Padova	1–3	Itas Trentino	27–25	22–25	21–25	27–29		97–104	Report
4 Mar	18:00	Cucine Lube Civitanova	3–0	Allianz Milano	25–22	25–15	25–12			75–49	Report
4 Mar	18:00	Top Volley Cisterna	3–0	Gas Sales Bluenergy Piacenza	25–18	25–18	25–20			75–56	Report
5 Mar	18:00	Valsa Group Modena	2–3	Vero Volley Monza	23–25	18–25	30–28	25–18	16–18	112–114	Report
5 Mar	20:30	Emma Villas Aubay Siena	0–3	WithU Verona	21–25	20–25	19–25			60–75	Report
Matchday 22
12 Mar	18:00	Sir Safety Susa Perugia	3–0	Cucine Lube Civitanova	25–16	25–19	25–20			75–55	Report
12 Mar	18:00	Itas Trentino	3–0	Valsa Group Modena	25–18	25–20	25–22			75–60	Report
11 Mar	18:00	WithU Verona	3–1	Top Volley Cisterna	25–22	25–20	21–25	25–20		96–87	Report
12 Mar	18:00	Allianz Milano	3–0	Gioiella Prisma Taranto	25–21	26–24	25–18			76–63	Report
12 Mar	18:00	Gas Sales Bluenergy Piacenza	3–1	Pallavolo Padova	25–15	18–25	25–21	25–21		93–82	Report
12 Mar	18:00	Vero Volley Monza	3–0	Emma Villas Aubay Siena	25–19	25–22	25–22			75–63	Report

== Italian Cup ==
Italian Cup is the middle-season tournament, featuring the top eight teams from Leg 1 to champion the traditional title. Gas Sales Bluenergy Piacenza won the title for the first time beating Itas Trentino 3-0 in straight sets.

Quarterfinals
29 December
Sir Safety Susa Perugia	3
Top Volley Cisterna	0
29 December
WithU Verona	2
Gas Sales Bluenergy Piacenza	3
29 December
Cucine Lube Civitanova	1
Allianz Milano	3
28 December
Valsa Group Modena	1
Itas Trentino	3

Semifinals
25 February
Sir Safety Susa Perugia	0
Gas Sales Bluenergy Piacenza	3
25 February
Allianz Milano	2
Itas Trentino	3

Final
26 February
Gas Sales Bluenergy Piacenza	3
Itas Trentino	0

== 5th place play-offs ==
- All times are local, Central European Summer Time (UTC+2:00).

=== Preliminary round ===
==== League and results table ====
Pos	Team	Pld	W	L	Pts	SW	SL	SR	SPW	SPL	SPR	Qualification	PAD	CIS	TAR
1	Pallavolo Padova	4	3	1	9	9	4	2.250	312	280	1.114	Group round		3–0	3–1
2	Top Volley Cisterna	4	2	2	6	6	7	0.857	297	294	1.010		0–3		3–0
3	Gioiella Prisma Taranto	4	1	3	3	5	9	0.556	299	334	0.895		3–0	1–3	

Source: Standings Play Off 5th place Credem Banca - Preliminaries & Play Off 5th place Credem Banca - Preliminaries

==== Fixtures and results ====
Date	Time		Score		Set 1	Set 2	Set 3	Set 4	Set 5	Total	Report
Matchday 1
16 Mar	20:30	Top Volley Cisterna	0–3	Pallavolo Padova	21–25	22–25	18–25			61–75	Report
Matchday 2
23 Mar	20:30	Top Volley Cisterna	3–0	Gioiella Prisma Taranto	25–21	25–21	25–17			75–59	Report
Matchday 3
26 Mar	15:30	Gioiella Prisma Taranto	3–0	Pallavolo Padova	28–26	25–22	25–17			78–65	Report
Matchday 4
2 Apr	15:30	Pallavolo Padova	3–0	Top Volley Cisterna	25–19	25–22	25–23			75–64	Report
Matchday 5
8 Apr	18:00	Gioiella Prisma Taranto	1–3	Top Volley Cisterna	25–20	25–27	16–25	19–25		85–97	Report
Matchday 6
12 Apr	20:30	Pallavolo Padova	3–1	Gioiella Prisma Taranto	25–13	25–21	22–25	25–18		97–77	Report

=== Group round ===
==== League and results table ====
Pos	Team	Pld	W	L	Pts	SW	SL	SR	SPW	SPL	SPR	Qualification	PGA	MZA	PAD	MOD	VER
1	Sir Safety Susa Perugia	4	3	1	8	10	5	2.000	375	337	1.113	Semifinals		—	—	3–0	3–2
2	Vero Volley Monza	4	3	1	8	9	5	1.800	334	307	1.088	Semifinals	0–3		3–0	—	—
3	Pallavolo Padova	4	2	2	5	6	9	0.667	331	355	0.932	Semifinals	3–1	—		3–2	—
4	Valsa Group Modena	4	1	3	5	7	10	0.700	379	402	0.943	Semifinals	—	2–3	—		3–1
5	WithU Verona	4	1	3	4	6	9	0.667	315	333	0.946		—	0–3	3–0	—	

Updated to match(es) played on 25 April 2023. Source: Standings Play Off 5th place Credem Banca - Group & Play Off 5th place Credem Banca - Group

==== Fixtures and results ====
Date	Time		Score		Set 1	Set 2	Set 3	Set 4	Set 5	Total	Report
Matchday 1
16 Apr	18:00	Valsa Group Modena	2–3	Vero Volley Monza	23–25	19–25	25–23	25–22	11–15	103–110	Report
15 Apr	20:30	WithU Verona	3–0	Pallavolo Padova	25–17	25–11	25–23			75–51	Report
Matchday 2
19 Apr	19:30	Vero Volley Monza	0–3	Sir Safety Susa Perugia	22–25	22–25	29–31			73–81	Report
19 Apr	20:30	Pallavolo Padova	3–2	Valsa Group Modena	25–21	22–25	25–21	26–28	15–11	113–106	Report
Matchday 3
22 Apr	19:30	Sir Safety Susa Perugia	3–2	WithU Verona	25–15	24–26	22–25	25–14	15–6	111–86	Report
22 Apr	19:30	Vero Volley Monza	3–0	Pallavolo Padova	25–21	25–21	25–22			75–64	Report
Matchday 4
25 Apr	18:00	Sir Safety Susa Perugia	3–0	Valsa Group Modena	25–22	25–21	34–32			84–75	Report
25 Apr	18:00	WithU Verona	0–3	Vero Volley Monza	18–25	17–25	24–26			59–76	Report
Matchday 5
30 Apr	18:00	Pallavolo Padova	3–1	Sir Safety Susa Perugia	18–25	26–24	34–32	25–18		103–99	Report
30 Apr	18:00	Valsa Group Modena	3–1	WithU Verona	25–22	18–25	27–25	25–23		95–95	Report

=== Final round ===
==== Bracket ====
Semifinals
1	Sir Safety Susa Perugia	3
4	Valsa Group Modena	0
2	Vero Volley Monza	3
3	Pallavolo Padova	0

Final
Sir Safety Susa Perugia	2
Vero Volley Monza	3

==== Semifinals ====
Date	Time		Score		Set 1	Set 2	Set 3	Set 4	Set 5	Total	Report
7 May	18:00	Sir Safety Susa Perugia	3–0	Valsa Group Modena	25–18	25–12	25–17			75–47	EN IT
7 May	18:00	Vero Volley Monza	3–0	Pallavolo Padova	25–23	35–33	25–14			85–70	EN IT

==== Final ====
Date	Time		Score		Set 1	Set 2	Set 3	Set 4	Set 5	Total	Report
13 May	20:30	Sir Safety Susa Perugia	2–3	Vero Volley Monza	25–21	15–25	25–19	24–26	10–15	99–106	EN IT

== Championship play–offs ==
- All times are local, Central European Summer Time (UTC+2:00).
- All are best-of-five series.

=== Bracket ===
Quarterfinals
18 March – 10 April
1 Sir Safety Susa Perugia	3	2	3	2	1
8 Allianz Milano	0	3	1	3	3
19 March – 8 April
4 Cucine Lube Civitanova	0	2	3	3	3
5 WithU Verona	3	3	0	1	0
19 March – 2 April
2 Itas Trentino	3	1	3	3
7 Vero Volley Monza	2	3	1	0
19 March – 10 April
3 Valsa Group Modena	3	3	0	0	2
6 Gas Sales Bluenergy Piacenza	2	2	3	3	3

Semifinals
13 April – 25 April
Allianz Milano	0	3	3	2	1
Cucine Lube Civitanova	3	2	0	3	3
13 April – 25 April
Itas Trentino	3	3	0	0	3
Gas Sales Bluenergy Piacenza	0	1	3	3	1

Final
1 May – 17 May
Cucine Lube Civitanova	1	3	0	3	0
Itas Trentino	3	2	3	1	3
3rd place match
30 April – 6 May
Allianz Milano	0	0	0
Gas Sales Bluenergy Piacenza	3	3	3

=== Quarterfinals ===
Date	Time		Score		Set 1	Set 2	Set 3	Set 4	Set 5	Total	Report
(1) Sir Safety Susa Perugia vs. (8) Allianz Milano
18 Mar	18:00	Sir Safety Susa Perugia	3–0	Allianz Milano	25–22	25–15	25–18			75–55	EN IT
22 Mar	20:30	Allianz Milano	3–2	Sir Safety Susa Perugia	27–25	25–21	21–25	18–25	15–13	106–109	EN IT
26 Mar	17:00	Sir Safety Susa Perugia	3–1	Allianz Milano	22–25	30–28	25–18	25–20		102–91	EN IT
2 Apr	18:00	Allianz Milano	3–2	Sir Safety Susa Perugia	25–15	19–25	19–25	28–26	15–13	106–104	EN IT
10 Apr	18:00	Sir Safety Susa Perugia	1–3	Allianz Milano	25–18	21–25	27–29	23–25		96–97	EN IT
(2) Itas Trentino vs. (7) Vero Volley Monza
19 Mar	18:00	Itas Trentino	3–2	Vero Volley Monza	25–16	25–21	13–25	18–25	15–13	96–100	EN IT
22 Mar	20:30	Vero Volley Monza	3–1	Itas Trentino	25–21	25–16	23–25	25–18		98–80	EN IT
25 Mar	20:30	Itas Trentino	3–1	Vero Volley Monza	22–25	25–18	25–19	25–19		97–81	EN IT
2 Apr	20:30	Vero Volley Monza	0–3	Itas Trentino	22–25	20–25	19–25			61–75	EN IT
(3) Valsa Group Modena vs. (6) Gas Sales Bluenergy Piacenza
19 Mar	18:00	Valsa Group Modena	3–2	Gas Sales Bluenergy Piacenza	25–19	23–25	25–19	20–25	15–11	108–99	EN IT
22 Mar	20:30	Gas Sales Bluenergy Piacenza	2–3	Valsa Group Modena	25–19	21–25	25–22	21–25	13–15	105–106	EN IT
26 Mar	17:00	Valsa Group Modena	0–3	Gas Sales Bluenergy Piacenza	21–25	22–25	23–23			66–73	EN IT
2 Apr	18:00	Gas Sales Bluenergy Piacenza	3–0	Valsa Group Modena	25–20	25–21	25–20			75–61	EN IT
10 Apr	18:00	Valsa Group Modena	2–3	Gas Sales Bluenergy Piacenza	25–19	25–17	20–25	21–25	12–25	103–111	EN IT
(4) Cucine Lube Civitanova vs. (5) WithU Verona
19 Mar	18:00	Cucine Lube Civitanova	0–3	WithU Verona	24–26	29–31	24–26			77–83	EN IT
22 Mar	20:30	WithU Verona	3–2	Cucine Lube Civitanova	24–26	25–20	20–25	25–23	15–11	109–105	EN IT
26 Mar	18:00	Cucine Lube Civitanova	3–0	WithU Verona	25–17	25–22	28–26			78–65	EN IT
1 Apr	20:30	WithU Verona	1–3	Cucine Lube Civitanova	25–20	23–25	26–28	24–26		98–99	EN IT
8 Apr	18:00	Cucine Lube Civitanova	3–0	WithU Verona	25–19	25–23	25–23			75–65	EN IT

=== Semifinals ===
Date	Time		Score		Set 1	Set 2	Set 3	Set 4	Set 5	Total	Report
Allianz Milano vs. Cucine Lube Civitanova
13 Apr	20:30	Cucine Lube Civitanova	3–0	Allianz Milano	25–17	25–22	25–17			75–56	EN IT
16 Apr	18:00	Allianz Milano	3–2	Cucine Lube Civitanova	25–18	20–25	25–21	21–25	15–9	106–98	EN IT
19 Apr	20:30	Cucine Lube Civitanova	0–3	Allianz Milano	23–25	18–25	24–26			65–76	EN IT
22 Apr	18:00	Allianz Milano	2–3	Cucine Lube Civitanova	25–23	25–18	19–25	22–25	7–15	98–106	EN IT
25 Apr	18:00	Cucine Lube Civitanova	3–1	Allianz Milano	27–25	25–22	23–25	27–25		102–97	EN IT
Itas Trentino vs. Gas Sales Bluenergy Piacenza
13 Apr	20:30	Itas Trentino	3–0	Gas Sales Bluenergy Piacenza	25–23	25–22	25–18			75–63	EN IT
16 Apr	18:00	Gas Sales Bluenergy Piacenza	1–3	Itas Trentino	19–25	22–25	25–20	20–25		86–95	EN IT
19 Apr	20:30	Itas Trentino	0–3	Gas Sales Bluenergy Piacenza	23–25	22–25	20–25			65–75	EN IT
22 Apr	20:30	Gas Sales Bluenergy Piacenza	3–0	Itas Trentino	25–21	25–23	25–23			75–67	EN IT
25 Apr	18:00	Itas Trentino	3–1	Gas Sales Bluenergy Piacenza	18–25	25–20	25–17	25–19		93–81	EN IT

=== 3rd place match ===
Date	Time		Score		Set 1	Set 2	Set 3	Set 4	Set 5	Total	Report
30 Apr	18:00	Gas Sales Bluenergy Piacenza	3–0	Allianz Milano	25–17	25–16	25–22			75–55	EN IT
3 May	20:30	Allianz Milano	0–3	Gas Sales Bluenergy Piacenza	24–26	19–25	23–25			66–76	EN IT
6 May	18:00	Gas Sales Bluenergy Piacenza	3–0	Allianz Milano	25–19	28–26	25–21			78–66	EN IT

=== Final ===
Date	Time		Score		Set 1	Set 2	Set 3	Set 4	Set 5	Total	Report
1 May	18:15	Itas Trentino	3–1	Cucine Lube Civitanova	25–23	23–25	25–23	25–17		98–88	EN IT
4 May	20:30	Cucine Lube Civitanova	3–2	Itas Trentino	25–21	25–15	19–25	23–25	17–15	109–101	EN IT
7 May	18:00	Itas Trentino	3–0	Cucine Lube Civitanova	25–17	25–20	25–16			75–53	EN IT
12 May	20:30	Cucine Lube Civitanova	3–1	Itas Trentino	25–18	27–25	20–25	25–16		97–84	EN IT
17 May	20:30	Itas Trentino	3–0	Cucine Lube Civitanova	25–20	25–20	25–19			75–59	EN IT

== Final standings ==
Qualified for the 2023–24 CEV Champions League
Qualified for the 2023–24 CEV Cup
Qualified for the 2023–24 CEV Challenge Cup
Relegated to Serie A2

Rank	Team
1st place, gold medalist(s)	Itas Trentino
2nd place, silver medalist(s)	Cucine Lube Civitanova
3rd place, bronze medalist(s)	Gas Sales Bluenergy Piacenza
4	Allianz Milano
5	Vero Volley Monza
6	Sir Safety Susa Perugia
7	Pallavolo Padova
8	Valsa Group Modena
9	WithU Verona
10	Top Volley Cisterna
11	Gioiella Prisma Taranto
12	Emma Villas Aubay Siena

2022–23 Italian SuperLega champions
Itas Trentino
5th title

14–man roster
Matey Kaziyski (c), Gabriele Nelli, Wout D'Heer, Donovan Džavoronok, Alessandro Michieletto, Riccardo Sbertoli, Oreste Cavuto, Domenico Pace, Martin Berger, Niccolò Depalma, Gabriele Laurenzano, Daniele Lavia, Marko Podraščanin, and Srećko Lisinac.
Head coach
Angelo Lorenzetti

== Awards ==
=== Awards of the Season ===
- Best coach

Angelo Lorenzetti (ITA) (Itas Trentino)

- Best U–23 player

Paolo Porro (ITA) (Allianz Milano)

- Best referee

Stefano Cesare (ITA)

- Best scorer

Adis Lagumdzija (TUR) (Valsa Group Modena)

- Best receiver

Oleh Plotnytskyi (UKR) (Sir Safety Susa Perugia)

- Best server

Kamil Semeniuk (POL) (Sir Safety Susa Perugia)

- Best spiker

Alessandro Michieletto (ITA) (Itas Trentino)

- Best middle blocker

Robertlandy Simon (CUB) (Gas Sales Bluenergy Piacenza)

- Most aces

Yuri Romanò (ITA) (Gas Sales Bluenergy Piacenza)

- Most winning blocker

Marko Podrascanin (SRB) (Itas Trentino)

- Most winning spiker

Petar Dirlic (CRO) (Top Volley Cisterna)

=== MVP of the month ===
- Credem Banca MVP of October

(Bulgaria) Matey Kaziyski (Itas Trentino)

- Credem Banca MVP of November

(Turkey) Adis Lagumdzija (Valsa Group Modena)

- Credem Banca MVP of December

(Brazil) Yoandy Leal (Gas Sales Bluenergy Piacenza)

- Credem Banca MVP of January

(Poland) Wilfredo Leon (Sir Safety Susa Perugia)

- Credem Banca MVP of February

(Italy) Luca Spirito (WithU Verona)

=== Playoffs MVP ===
- Credem Banca MVP of the Quarterfinals

(Cuba) Osniel Melgarejo (Allianz Milano)

- Credem Banca MVP of the Semifinals

(Bulgaria) Aleksandar Nikolov (Cucine Lube Civitanova)

- Credem Banca MVP of the Finals

(Bulgaria) Matey Kaziyski (Itas Trentino)

== Attendances ==
The average attendance was 3,592.

#	Club	Average attendance
1	Sir Safety Susa Perugia	4,678
2	Allianz Milano	4,456
3	WithU Verona	4,223
4	Itas Trentino	3,644
5	Gas Sales Bluenergy Piacenza	3,456
6	Cucine Lube Civitanova	3,354
7	Vero Volley Monza	3,223
8	Emma Villas Aubay Siena	3,220
9	Pallavolo Padova	2,923
10	Valsa Group Modena	2,756
11	Top Volley Cisterna	2,633
12	Gioiella Prisma Taranto	2,456

== See also ==
- 2022–23 CEV Champions League
- 2022–23 CEV Cup
