= Volleyball at the 2019 Summer Universiade – Men's tournament =

Men's volleyball at the XXX Summer Universiade
- Venue: Naples, Italy
- Dates: 5–13 July
- Teams: 20

Medalists
1st place, gold medalist(s)		Italy (2nd title)
2nd place, silver medalist(s)		Poland
3rd place, bronze medalist(s)		Russia

The 2019 Men's Summer Universiade Volleyball Tournament was the 30th edition of the event, organized by the Summer Universiade. It was held in Naples, Italy from 5 to 13 July 2019.

== Pool standing procedure ==
1. Number of matches won
2. Match points
3. Sets ratio
4. Points ratio
5. If the tie continues as per the point ratio between two teams, the priority will be given to the team which won the last match between them. When the tie in points ratio is between three or more teams, a new classification of these teams in the terms of points 1, 2 and 3 will be made taking into consideration only the matches in which they were opposed to each other.

Match won 3–0 or 3–1: 3 match points for the winner, 0 match points for the loser
Match won 3–2: 2 match points for the winner, 1 match point for the loser

== Preliminary round ==
- All times are Central European Summer Time (UTC+02:00)

=== Pool A ===
Pos	Team	Pld	W	L	Pts	SW	SL	SR	SPW	SPL	SPR	Qualification
1	Czech Republic	4	4	0	12	12	3	4.000	377	300	1.257	Quarterfinals
2	Chinese Taipei	4	3	1	8	10	6	1.667	362	315	1.149	Quarterfinals
3	Ukraine	4	2	2	6	9	8	1.125	367	367	1.000	9–16th place quarterfinals
4	Chile	4	1	3	4	6	9	0.667	312	355	0.879	9–16th place quarterfinals
5	Hong Kong	4	0	4	0	1	12	0.083	250	331	0.755	17–20th place semifinals

Source: Napoli 2019

Date	Time		Score		Set 1	Set 2	Set 3	Set 4	Set 5	Total	Report
5 Jul	12:30	Chile	0–3	Czech Republic	13–25	15–25	28–30			56–80	P2
5 Jul	14:30	Chinese Taipei	3–2	Ukraine	25–22	15–25	22–25	25–17	15–13	102–102	P2
6 Jul	12:00	Czech Republic	3–1	Chinese Taipei	25–23	25–18	24–26	25–21		99–88	P2
6 Jul	14:40	Hong Kong	0–3	Chile	22–25	32–34	18–25			72–84	P2
7 Jul	12:00	Chinese Taipei	3–0	Hong Kong	25–13	25–18	25–17			75–48	P2
7 Jul	17:30	Ukraine	1–3	Czech Republic	28–26	13–25	21–25	22–25		84–101	P2
8 Jul	12:00	Chile	1–3	Chinese Taipei	25–22	18–25	14–25	9–25		66–97	P2
8 Jul	14:30	Hong Kong	0–3	Ukraine	21–25	16–25	21–25			58–75	P2
9 Jul	12:00	Ukraine	3–2	Chile	21–25	25–22	25–23	20–25	15–11	106–106	P2
9 Jul	15:00	Czech Republic	3–1	Hong Kong	22–25	25–19	25–18	25–10		97–72	P2

=== Pool B ===
Pos	Team	Pld	W	L	Pts	SW	SL	SR	SPW	SPL	SPR	Qualification
1	Russia	4	4	0	12	12	1	12.000	324	232	1.397	Quarterfinals
2	Portugal	4	3	1	9	10	4	2.500	338	306	1.105	Quarterfinals
3	United States	4	2	2	4	6	10	0.600	329	369	0.892	9–16th place quarterfinals
4	South Korea	4	1	3	4	6	9	0.667	320	352	0.909	9–16th place quarterfinals
5	China	4	0	4	1	2	12	0.167	286	338	0.846	17–20th place semifinals

Source: Napoli 2019

Date	Time		Score		Set 1	Set 2	Set 3	Set 4	Set 5	Total	Report
5 Jul	17:30	United States	3–2	South Korea	25–21	25–20	18–25	21–25	15–13	104–104	P2
5 Jul	20:20	Russia	3–1	Portugal	24–26	25–15	25–20	25–17		99–78	P2
6 Jul	17:30	South Korea	0–3	Russia	17–25	22–25	18–25			57–75	P2
6 Jul	20:00	China	2–3	United States	25–19	22–25	22–25	25–23	13–15	107–107	P2
7 Jul	17:30	Portugal	3–1	South Korea	25–21	25–20	27–29	25–8		102–78	P2
7 Jul	20:00	Russia	3–0	China	25–20	25–15	25–15			75–50	P2
8 Jul	17:30	United States	0–3	Russia	13–25	15–25	19–25			47–75	P2
8 Jul	17:30	China	0–3	Portugal	22–25	18–25	18–25			58–75	P2
9 Jul	12:00	South Korea	3–0	China	25–23	25–19	31–29			81–71	P2
9 Jul	14:30	Portugal	3–0	United States	25–19	33–31	25–21			83–71	P2

=== Pool C ===
Pos	Team	Pld	W	L	Pts	SW	SL	SR	SPW	SPL	SPR	Qualification
1	Poland	4	4	0	12	12	0	MAX	300	226	1.327	Quarterfinals
2	France	4	3	1	8	9	7	1.286	360	334	1.078	Quarterfinals
3	Brazil	4	2	2	6	7	7	1.000	310	305	1.016	9–16th place quarterfinals
4	Canada	4	1	3	2	5	11	0.455	321	363	0.884	9–16th place quarterfinals
5	Iran	4	0	4	2	4	12	0.333	304	367	0.828	17–20th place semifinals

Source: Napoli 2019

Date	Time		Score		Set 1	Set 2	Set 3	Set 4	Set 5	Total	Report
5 Jul	17:30	Brazil	0–3	Poland	22–25	11–25	23–25			56–75	P2
5 Jul	20:00	France	3–2	Iran	25–12	25–19	19–25	25–27	15–8	109–91	P2
6 Jul	17:30	Poland	3–0	France	25–14	25–22	25–19			75–55	P2
6 Jul	17:30	Canada	1–3	Brazil	13–25	25–18	21–25	18–25		77–93	P2
7 Jul	12:00	Iran	0–3	Poland	19–25	21–25	21–25			61–75	P2
7 Jul	14:30	France	3–1	Canada	25–18	25–27	25–17	25–20		100–82	P2
8 Jul	12:00	Brazil	1–3	France	21–25	18–25	25–21	22–25		86–96	P2
8 Jul	14:30	Canada	3–2	Iran	20–25	25–18	23–25	25–17	15–10	108–95	P2
9 Jul	17:30	Poland	3–0	Canada	25–20	25–16	25–18			75–54	P2
9 Jul	20:00	Iran	0–3	Brazil	18–25	21–25	18–25			57–75	P2

=== Pool D ===
Pos	Team	Pld	W	L	Pts	SW	SL	SR	SPW	SPL	SPR	Qualification
1	Italy (H)	4	4	0	11	12	2	6.000	333	270	1.233	Quarterfinals
2	Japan	4	3	1	9	9	4	2.250	308	275	1.120	Quarterfinals
3	Argentina	4	2	2	7	8	7	1.143	333	321	1.037	9–16th place quarterfinals
4	Switzerland	4	1	3	3	5	10	0.500	329	365	0.901	9–16th place quarterfinals
5	Mexico	4	0	4	0	1	12	0.083	261	333	0.784	17–20th place semifinals

Source: Napoli 2019
(H) Host

Date	Time		Score		Set 1	Set 2	Set 3	Set 4	Set 5	Total	Report
5 Jul	12:00	Mexico	0–3	Argentina	20–25	16–25	19–25			55–75	P2
5 Jul	17:30	Switzerland	0–3	Italy	17–25	23–25	15–25			55–75	P2
6 Jul	12:00	Japan	3–0	Mexico	25–15	25–21	25–20			75–56	P2
6 Jul	20:00	Argentina	3–1	Switzerland	25–20	22–25	25–18	25–20		97–83	P2
7 Jul	20:00	Italy	3–2	Argentina	23–25	20–25	25–15	25–23	15–12	108–100	P2
7 Jul	20:00	Switzerland	1–3	Japan	25–23	21–25	16–25	21–25		83–98	P2
8 Jul	20:00	Japan	0–3	Italy	22–25	19–25	19–25			60–75	P2
8 Jul	20:00	Mexico	1–3	Switzerland	20–25	32–34	26–24	17–25		95–108	P2
9 Jul	17:30	Argentina	0–3	Japan	20–25	23–25	18–25			61–75	P2
9 Jul	20:00	Italy	3–0	Mexico	25–20	25–16	25–19			75–55	P2

== Final round ==
=== 17th–20th places ===
17th–20th semifinals
11 July
Hong Kong	1
Mexico	3
11 July
China	0
Iran	3

17th place match
12 July
Mexico	3
Iran	0
19th place match
12 July
Hong Kong	3
China	0

==== 17–20th place semifinals ====
Date	Time		Score		Set 1	Set 2	Set 3	Set 4	Set 5	Total	Report
11 Jul	17:30	Hong Kong	1–3	Mexico	25–22	14–25	13–25	21–25		73–97	P2
11 Jul	20:00	China	0–3	Iran	16–25	22–25	19–25			57–75	P2

==== 19th place match ====
Date	Time		Score		Set 1	Set 2	Set 3	Set 4	Set 5	Total	Report
12 Jul	14:30	Hong Kong	3–0	China	25–21	25–23	25–13			75–57	P2

==== 17th place match ====
Date	Time		Score		Set 1	Set 2	Set 3	Set 4	Set 5	Total	Report
12 Jul	17:30	Mexico	3–0	Iran	25–23	25–20	25–18			75–61	P2

=== 9th–16th places ===
9th–16th quarterfinals
11 July
Ukraine	0
Canada	3
11 July
Argentina	2
South Korea	3
11 July
Brazil	3
Chile	1
11 July
United States	0
Switzerland	3

9th–12th semifinals
12 July
Canada	0
South Korea	3
12 July
Brazil	1
Switzerland	3

9th place match
13 July
South Korea	0
Switzerland	3
11th place match
13 July
Canada	3
Brazil	2

13th–16th semifinals
12 July
Ukraine	3
Argentina	2
12 July
Chile	3
United States	1

13th place match
13 July
Ukraine	3
Chile	0
15th place match
13 July
Argentina	3
United States	0

==== 9–16th place quarterfinals ====
Date	Time		Score		Set 1	Set 2	Set 3	Set 4	Set 5	Total	Report
11 Jul	12:00	United States	0–3	Switzerland	23–25	21–25	15–25			59–75	P2
11 Jul	14:30	Brazil	3–1	Chile	23–25	25–19	25–22	25–19		98–85	P2
11 Jul	17:30	Ukraine	0–3	Canada	17–25	13–25	16–25			46–75	P2
11 Jul	20:00	Argentina	2–3	South Korea	24–26	25–16	25–18	19–25	12–15	105–100	P2

==== 13–16th place semifinals ====
Date	Time		Score		Set 1	Set 2	Set 3	Set 4	Set 5	Total	Report
12 Jul	17:30	Ukraine	3–2	Argentina	19–25	29–27	23–25	25–21	15–11	111–109	P2
12 Jul	17:30	Chile	3–1	United States	21–25	25–16	25–22	25–21		96–84	P2

==== 9–12th place semifinals ====
Date	Time		Score		Set 1	Set 2	Set 3	Set 4	Set 5	Total	Report
12 Jul	12:00	Brazil	1–3	Switzerland	22–25	17–25	25–22	21–25		85–97	P2
12 Jul	14:30	Canada	0–3	South Korea	21–25	23–25	26–28			70–78	P2

==== 15th place match ====
Date	Time		Score		Set 1	Set 2	Set 3	Set 4	Set 5	Total	Report
13 Jul	12:00	Argentina	3–0	United States	25–20	25–15	25–20			75–55	P2

==== 13th place match ====
Date	Time		Score		Set 1	Set 2	Set 3	Set 4	Set 5	Total	Report
13 Jul	14:30	Ukraine	3–0	Chile	25–20	25–20	25–22			75–62	P2

==== 11th place match ====
Date	Time		Score		Set 1	Set 2	Set 3	Set 4	Set 5	Total	Report
13 Jul	12:00	Canada	3–2	Brazil	25–16	23–25	25–21	19–25	15–9	107–96	P2

==== 9th place match ====
Date	Time		Score		Set 1	Set 2	Set 3	Set 4	Set 5	Total	Report
13 Jul	14:30	South Korea	0–3	Switzerland	15–25	25–27	17–25			57–77	P2

=== 1st–8th places ===
Quarterfinals
11 July
Czech Republic	1
France	3
11 July
Italy	3
Portugal	0
11 July
Poland	3
Chinese Taipei	0
11 July
Russia	3
Japan	1

Semifinals
12 July
France	0
Italy	3
12 July
Poland	3
Russia	2

Final
13 July
Italy	3
Poland	2
3rd place match
13 July
France	0
Russia	3

5th–8th semifinals
12 July
Czech Republic	3
Portugal	1
12 July
Chinese Taipei	1
Japan	3

5th place match
13 July
Czech Republic	0
Japan	3
7th place match
13 July
Portugal	1
Chinese Taipei	3

==== Quarterfinals ====
Date	Time		Score		Set 1	Set 2	Set 3	Set 4	Set 5	Total	Report
11 Jul	12:00	Russia	3–1	Japan	25–21	25–11	23–25	25–14		98–71	P2
11 Jul	14:30	Poland	3–0	Chinese Taipei	25–17	25–18	25–9			75–44	P2
11 Jul	17:30	Czech Republic	1–3	France	22–25	17–25	26–24	19–25		84–99	P2
11 Jul	20:00	Italy	3–0	Portugal	25–16	25–21	25–15			75–52	P2

==== 5–8th place semifinals ====
Date	Time		Score		Set 1	Set 2	Set 3	Set 4	Set 5	Total	Report
12 Jul	12:00	Chinese Taipei	1–3	Japan	31–33	23–25	25–16	22–25		101–99	P2
12 Jul	14:30	Czech Republic	3–1	Portugal	25–23	25–23	21–25	25–18		96–89	P2

==== Semifinals ====
Date	Time		Score		Set 1	Set 2	Set 3	Set 4	Set 5	Total	Report
12 Jul	12:00	Poland	3–2	Russia	25–21	25–15	19–25	18–25	17–15	104–101	P2
12 Jul	14:30	France	0–3	Italy	16–25	21–25	18–25			55–75	P2

==== 7th place match ====
Date	Time		Score		Set 1	Set 2	Set 3	Set 4	Set 5	Total	Report
13 Jul	12:00	Portugal	1–3	Chinese Taipei	25–14	18–25	28–30	23–25		94–94	P2

==== 5th place match ====
Date	Time		Score		Set 1	Set 2	Set 3	Set 4	Set 5	Total	Report
13 Jul	14:30	Czech Republic	0–3	Japan	19–25	18–25	22–25			59–75	P2

==== 3rd place match ====
Date	Time		Score		Set 1	Set 2	Set 3	Set 4	Set 5	Total	Report
13 Jul	17:30	France	0–3	Russia	18–25	20–25	22–25			60–75	P2

==== Final ====
Date	Time		Score		Set 1	Set 2	Set 3	Set 4	Set 5	Total	Report
13 Jul	20:30	Italy	3–2	Poland	16–25	25–20	22–25	25–23	15–10	103–103	P2

== Final standing ==
Rank	Team
1st place, gold medalist(s)	Italy
2nd place, silver medalist(s)	Poland
3rd place, bronze medalist(s)	Russia
4	France
5	Japan
6	Czech Republic
7	Chinese Taipei
8	Portugal
9	Switzerland
10	South Korea
11	Canada
12	Brazil
13	Ukraine
14	Chile
15	Argentina
16	United States
17	Mexico
18	Iran
19	Hong Kong
20	China

2019 Men's Universiade champions

Italy
2nd title

12–man Roster
Ricci (c), Pinali, Milan, Raffaelli, Polo, Romanò, Zonca, Pierotti, Salsi, Piccinelli, Galassi, Zoppellari
Head Coach: Gianluca Graziosi

== Medalists ==
Gold	Silver	Bronze
Italy (ITA); Fabio Ricci (c); Giulio Pinali; Sebastiano Milan; Giacomo Raffaelli; Alberto Polo; Yuri Romanò; Paolo Zonca; Marco Pierotti; Nicola Salsi; Alessandro Piccinelli; Gianluca Galassi; Francesco Zoppellari	Poland (POL); Jan Nowakowski; Michał Kędzierski (c); Łukasz Kozub; Bartłomiej Lipiński; Bartłomiej Lemański; Jędrzej Gruszczyński; Patryk Niemiec; Bartosz Filipiak; Kamil Semeniuk; Mateusz Masłowski; Paweł Halaba; Damian Domagała	Russia (RUS); Pavel Pankov (c); Kirill Klets; Andrey Surmachevskiy; Aleksei Kononov; Kirill Ursov; Roman Pakshin; Denis Bogdan; Dmitry Yakovlev; Roman Poroshin; Maksim Belogortsev; Aleksandr Melnikov; Semen Krivitchenko
