= Emma Villas Siena =

- Full name: Emma Villas Aubay Siena
- Short name: Siena Volley
- Founded: 2013
- Ground: PalaEstra (Capacity: 5,500)
- Chairman: (Italy) Giammarco Bisogno
- Manager: (Italy) Paolo Montagnani
- League: Italian Volleyball League
- Website: Club home page

Uniforms
Home	Away

Emma Villas Volley is a professional volleyball team based in Siena, Italy. The club plays in Serie A1 of the Italian Volleyball League.

== Former names ==
- 2013–2015: Emma Villas Chiusi
- 2015–2019: Emma Villas Siena
- 2019–present: Emma Villas Aubay Siena

== History ==
Emma Villas Vitt Chiusi was founded in 2013 by detaching itself from Vitt Chiusi Volleyball, from which it inherited the sporting title to participate in Serie B2: the newborn company ranks second at the end of the regular 2013-14 season in its group, obtaining promotion to Serie B1 thanks to the victory of the promotion play-offs against Marconi Volley Spoleto.

In the 2014-15 season he participates in the Serie B1 championship where he wins the regular season and is promoted to Serie A2. In the 2015-16 vintage the club changes its name to Emma Villas Volley and moves its registered office to Siena: it therefore participates in the second national division. In the 2016-17 season club won the Italian Cup in the category by beating Tuscania Volley in the final, while in the following one, thanks to the victory of the promotion play-offs, she was promoted to Serie A1.

In the 2018-19 season he made his debut in the Italian top division, but at the end of the championship, thanks to the thirteenth place in the standings, he relegated to the cadet series.

2022-23 Season was the second times that Emma Villas Siena compete in SuperLega. With five wins out of twenty-two matches, Emma Villas Aubay Siena finished bottom of the 2022-23 Season, it was sent to the second division in 2023-2024 Season.

== Statistics ==
Season	Position
2013/2014 - Serie B2	2
2014/2015 - Serie B1	1
2015/2016 - Serie A2	6
2016/2017 - Serie A2	3
2017/2018 - Serie A2	1
2018/2019 - Serie A1	13
2019/2020 - Serie A2	1
2020/2021 - Serie A2	4
2021/2022 - Serie A2	9
2022/2023 - Serie A1	12

== Team ==
Team roster – season 2022/2023

No.	Name	Date of birth	Position
1	(Italy) Giulio Pinali	2 April 1997 (age 27)	opposite
2	(Italy) Fabio Ricci	11 July 1994 (age 30)	middle blocker
3	(Netherlands) Maarten van Garderen	24 January 1990 (age 35)	outside hitter
4	(Serbia) Nemanja Petrić	28 July 1987 (age 37)	outside hitter
6	(Italy) Federico Bonami	29 September 1993 (age 31)	libero
7	(Italy) Giacomo Raffaelli	7 February 1995 (age 30)	outside hitter
8	(Italy) Omar Biglino	9 August 1995 (age 29)	middle blocker
9	(Italy) Riccardo Pinelli	17 February 1991 (age 34)	setter
10	(Argentina) Juan Ignacio Finoli	5 November 1991 (age 33)	setter
11	(Argentina) Federico Pereyra	19 June 1988 (age 36)	opposite
12	(France) Swan N'Gapeth	9 January 1992 (age 33)	outside hitter
13	(Italy) Filippo Pochini	13 December 1989 (age 35)	libero
18	(Italy) Daniele Mazzone	4 June 1992 (age 32)	middle blocker
Head coach: (Italy) Paolo Montagnani
