= Gabriele Nelli =

Italian volleyball player (born 1993)

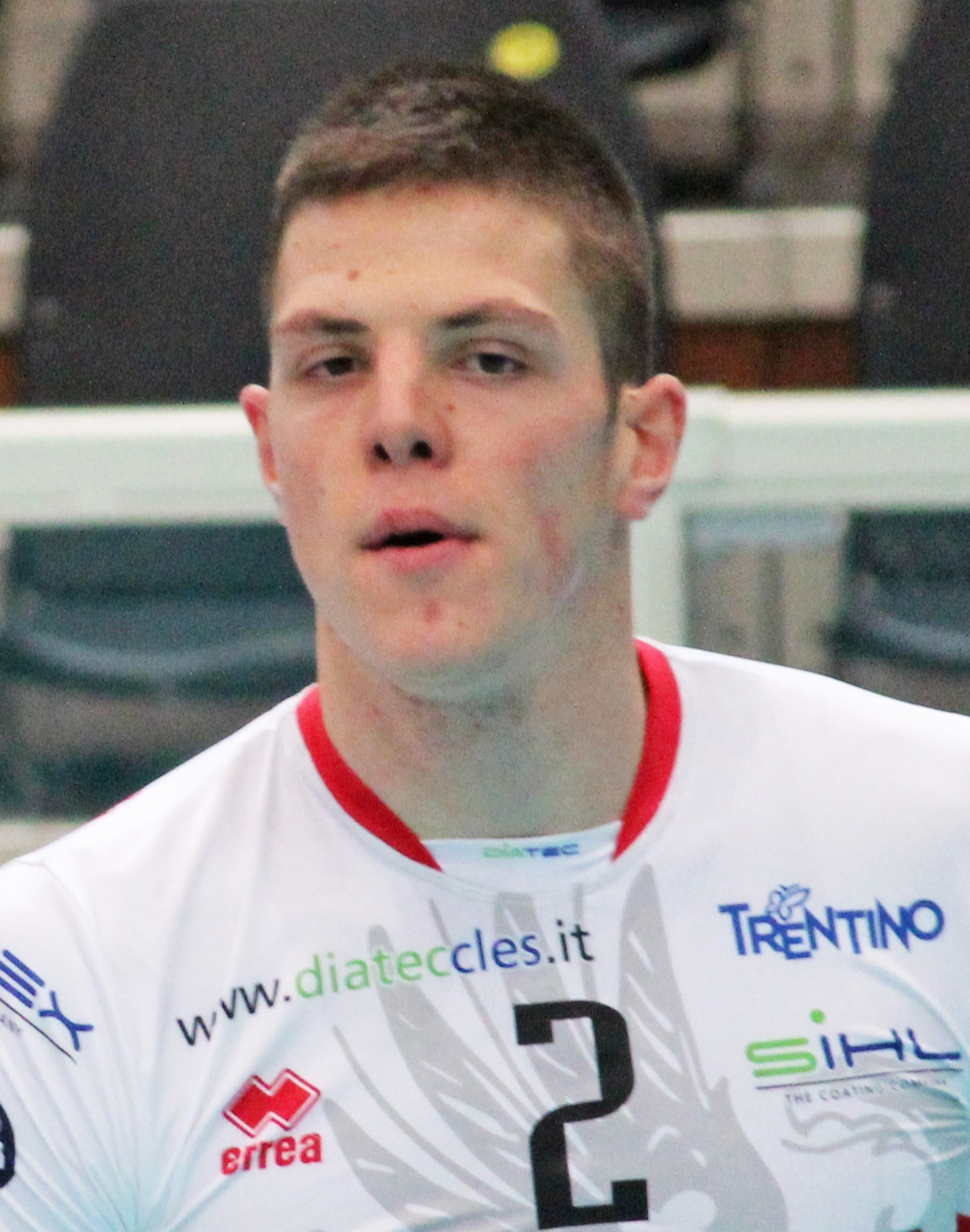

Personal information
- Nationality: Italian
- Born: 4 December 1993 (age 32); Lucca, Tuscany, Italy
- Height: 2.10 m (6 ft 11 in)
- Weight: 100 kg (220 lb)
- Spike: 355 cm (140 in)
- Block: 320 cm (126 in)

Volleyball information
- Position: Opposite
- Current club: Trentino Volley
- Number: 2

Career
Years	Teams
2013–2017; 2017–2018; 2018–2019; 2019–2020; 2020–2021; 2021; 2021–2022; 2022–	Diatec Trentino; Kioene Padova; Trentino Volley; Gas Sales Piacenza; Belogorie; Cannes; Volley Callipo; Trentino Volley

National team
2015–	Italy
Honours
Junior European Championship
Gold medal – first place	2012 Poland/Denmark
- Last updated: 7 October 2022

Gabriele Nelli (born 4 December 1993) is an Italian male professional volleyball player. He is part of the Italy men's national volleyball team. On club level he plays for Trentino Volley.

== Sporting achievements ==
=== Clubs ===
==== CEV Champions League ====
- 2023/2024 – with Itas Diatec Trentino
- 2015/2016 - with Trentino Diatec

==== Club World Championship ====
- Poland 2018 – with Trentino Volley
- Brazil 2022 – with Trentino Itas

==== National championships ====
- 2016/2017 Italian Championship, with Diatec Trentino
- 2022/2023 Italian Cup, with Itas Trentino
- 2022/2023 Italian Championship, with Itas Trentino
