= Aleksa Batak =

Serbian volleyball player (born 2000)

Personal information
- Nationality: Serbian
- Born: 18 January 2000 (age 26)
- Height: 1.98 cm (1 in)

Volleyball information
- Position: Setter
- Current club: (Italy) Consar Ravenna
- Number: 12

Career
Years	Teams
2009-2017; 2017-2018; 2018-2019; 2019-	(Serbia) OK Partizan (Serbia) OK Niš (Serbia) Mladi Radnik Požarevac (Italy) Consar Ravenna

Aleksa Batak (born 18 January 2000) is a Serbian volleyball player. Since the 2019/2020 season, he is playing in the Italian Serie A, in the team Consar Ravenna.
