= Domenico Pace (volleyball) =

Italian volleyball player (born 2000)

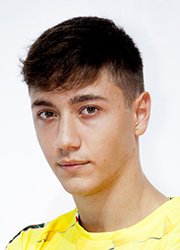
- Pace in 2019

Personal information
- Nationality: Italian
- Born: 2 August 2000 (age 26); Castellana Grotte, Italy
- Height: 1.78 m (5 ft 10 in)

Volleyball information
- Position: Libero
- Current team: You Energy
- Number: 8

Career
Years	Teams
2015–2019	New Mater
2019–2021	Tuscania
2011–2022	Lupi Santa Croce
2022–2024	Trentino
2024–2025	Cisterna
2025–	You Energy

National team
2025–	Italy
Honours
Men's volleyball
Representing Italy
FIVB World Championship
Gold medal – first place	2025 Philippines
Nations League
Silver medal – second place	Ningbo 2025

Domenico Pace (born 2 August 2000) is an Italian professional volleyball player who plays as a libero for the Italian Volleyball League club, You Energy Volley and the Italy national team.

== Career ==
=== Club ===
Pace's career began in 2007 in the youth team of New Mater. In the 2015–16 season he was promoted to the first team, playing in the Serie B1 championship, with which he achieved double promotion, first to Serie A2 and then, at the end of the 2016–17 season, to SuperLega, where he made his debut, with the same shirt, in the 2017–18 season.

In the 2019–20 season, Pace was signed by Tuscania, in Serie A3, where he played for two years, before moving to Lupi Santa Croce, in Serie A2, for the 2021–22 season.

In the 2022–23 season, Pace returned to the SuperLega, wearing the Trentino shirt, with whom he won the 2022–23 championship and the 2023–24 Champions League, before signing in the 2024–25 season with Cisterna and in the 2025–26 season with You Energy Volley.

=== National team ===
In 2025, Pace received his first call-up to the Italian national team, with which, in the same year, he won the silver medal at the Nations League.

== Honours ==
=== Club ===
- CEV Champions League
  - 2023–24 – with You Energy
- Domestic
  - 2022–23 Italian Championship, with You Energy
