= Romolo Mariano =

Italian volleyball player (born 1991)

Personal information
- Nationality: Italian
- Born: 18 December 1991 (age 34); Bergamo
- Height: 6 ft 3 in (1.90 m)

Volleyball information
- Position: Outside spiker
- Current club: (Italy) Joy Gioia del Colle
- Number: 12

Career
Years	Teams
2008-2009; 2009-2012; 2012-2014; 2014-2015; 2015-2016; 2016-2019; 2019-2020; 2020-	(Italy) Pool Libertas Cantù (Italy) Olimpia Bergamo (Switzerland) PV Lugano (Italy) Volley Corigliano (Italy) Argos Volley Sora (Italy) Monini Marconi Spoleto (Italy) Emma Villas Siena (Italy) Pool Libertas Cantù

Romolo Mariano (born 18 December 1991) is an Italian volleyball player, a member of the club Pool Libertas Cantù.
