= Giulio Pinali =

Italian volleyball player (born 1997)

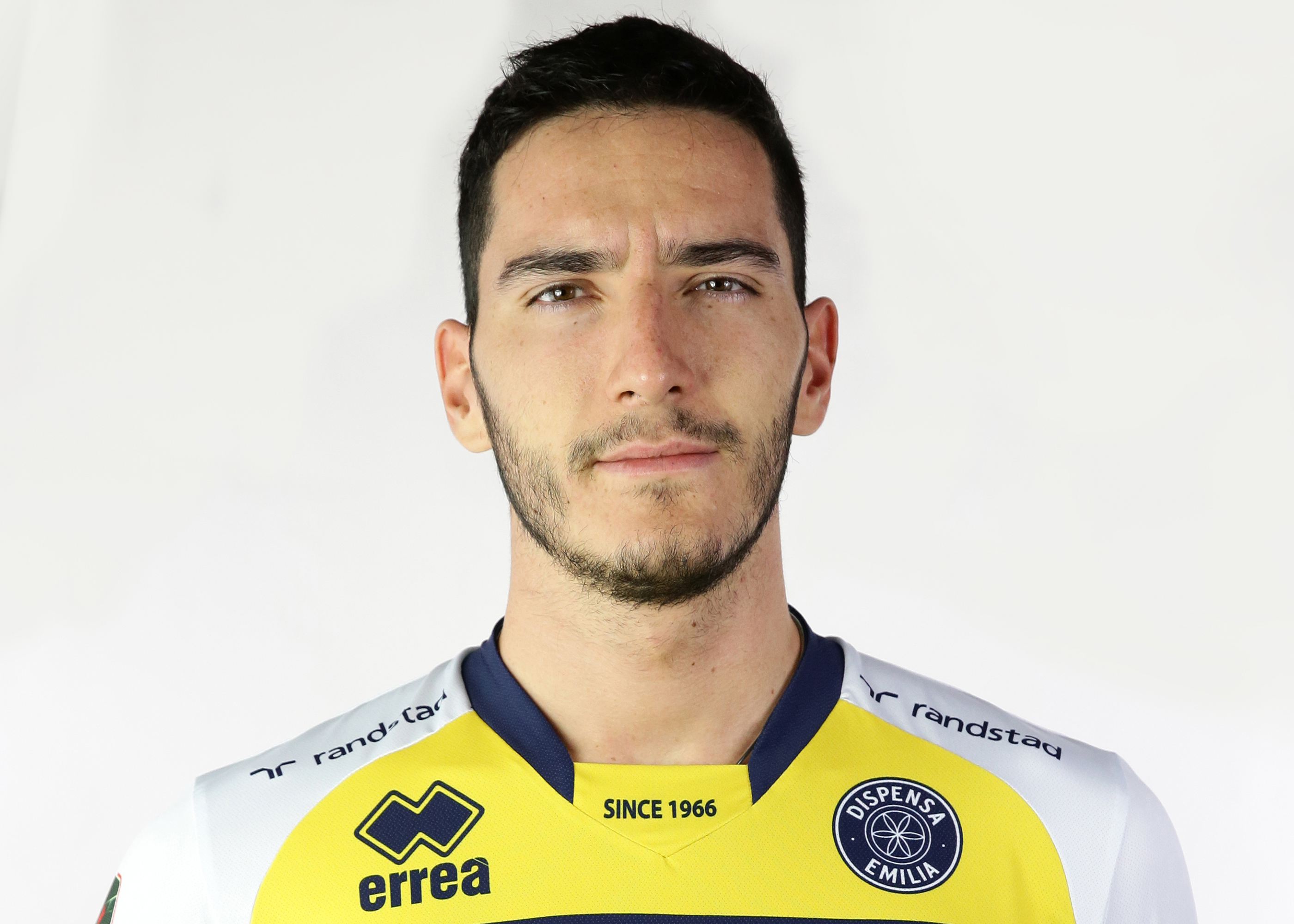

Personal information
- Nationality: Italy
- Born: 2 April 1997 (age 29); Bologna, Italy
- Height: 198 cm (6 ft 6 in)

Volleyball information
- Position: Opposite hitter
- Current club: Emma Villas Aubay Siena
- Number: 1

Career
Years	Teams
2017-2020	(Italy) Leo Shoes Modena
2020-2021	(Italy) Consar Ravenna
2021-2022	(Italy) Itas Trentino
2022	(Italy) Emma Villas Aubay Siena

National team
2015–	Italy
Honours
Men's volleyball
Representing Italy
World Championship
Gold medal – first place	2022 Poland/Slovenia
European Championship
Gold medal – first place	2021 Poland/Czechia/Estonia/Finland
Summer Universiade
Gold medal – first place	2018 Italy
Mediterranean Games
Gold medal – first place	2018 Spain
- Last updated: 16 November 2022

Giulio Pinali (2 April 1997) is an Italian volleyball player who won 2021 European Championship.

== Sporting achievements ==
=== Clubs ===
- FIVB Club World Championship
  - Betim 2021 – with Itas Trentino
