= Roamy Alonso =

Cuban volleyball player (born 1997)

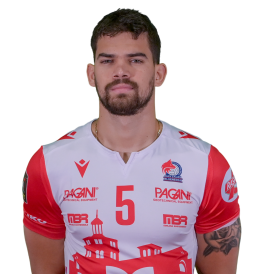

Personal information
- Full name: Roamy Raul Alonso Arce
- Born: 24 July 1997 (age 29); Cuba
- Height: 2.03 m (6 ft 8 in)
- Weight: 98 kg (216 lb)
- Spike: 355 cm (140 in)
- Block: 335 cm (132 in)

Volleyball information
- Position: Middle-blocker
- Current club: Galatasaray
- Number: 21

Career
Years
- 2015–2019
- 2019–2020
- 2020–2022
- 2022–2024
- 2024–2025
- 2025–
Teams
- Cocodrilos de Matanzas
- Consar Ravenna
- Chaumont Volley-Ball 52
- Gas Sales Bluenergy Piacenza
- Gioiella Prisma Taranto
- Galatasaray

National team
2016–	Cuba

Roamy Raul Alonso Arce (born 24 July 1997) is a Cuban volleyball player who plays as a Middle-blocker.

== Club career ==
On July 9, 2025, he signed a contract with the Turkish team Galatasaray.

On July 27, 2026, he signed a new one-year contract with Galatasaray.
