= Donovan Džavoronok =

Czech volleyball player (born 1997)

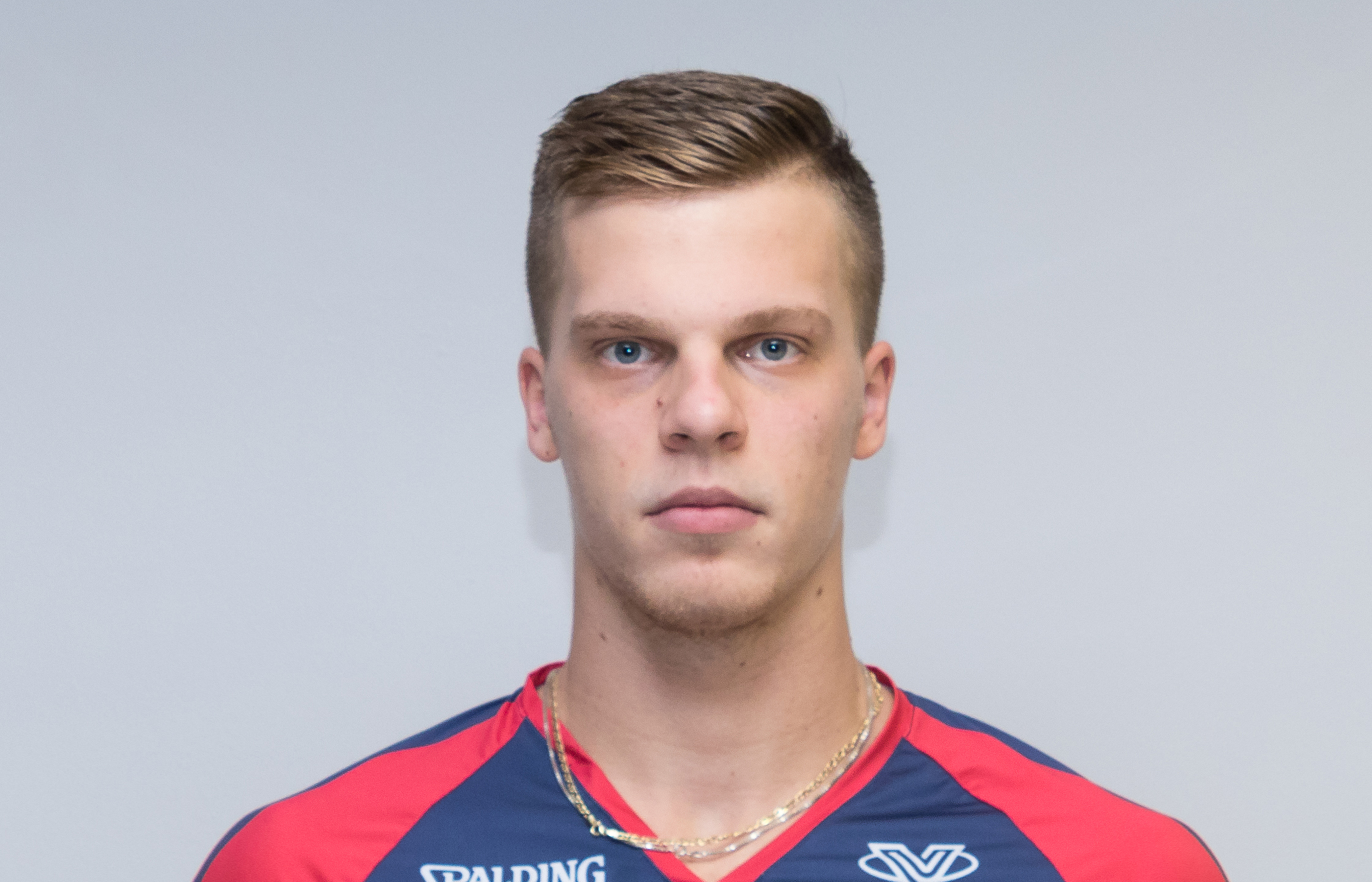

Personal information
- Born: 23 July 1997 (age 29); Brno, Czech Republic
- Height: 2.02 m (6 ft 8 in)
- Weight: 98 kg (216 lb)
- Spike: 354 cm (139 in)
- Block: 334 cm (131 in)

Volleyball information
- Position: Outside hitter
- Current club: Wolfdogs Nagoya
- Number: 44

Career
Years	Teams
2015–2016; 2016–2022; 2022–2023; 2023–2025; 2025–2026; 2026–	ČEZ Karlovarsko; Vero Volley Monza; Itas Trentino; Rana Verona; Sir Safety Perugia; Wolfdogs Nagoya

National team
2015–	Czech Republic
Honours
Men's volleyball
Representing Czech Republic
FIVB Challenger Cup
Silver medal – second place	2018 Matosinhos
European League
Silver medal – second place	2018 Czech Republic

Donovan Džavoronok (born 23 July 1997) is a Czech professional volleyball player who plays as an outside hitter for Sir Safety Perugia and the Czech Republic national team.

== Honours ==
=== Club ===
- FIVB Club World Championship
  - 2025, with Sir Sicoma Perugia
  - Betim 2022 – with Itas Trentino
- CEV Cup
  - 2021–22 – with Vero Volley Monza
- CEV Challenge Cup
  - 2018–19 – with Vero Volley Monza
- Domestic
  - 2022–23 Italian Championship, with Itas Trentino

=== Individual awards ===
- 2018: European League – Best outside spiker
