= Francesco Recine =

Italian volleyball player (born 1999)

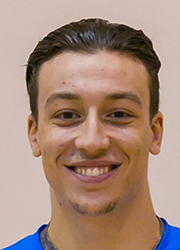

Personal information
- Born: 7 February 1999 (age 27); Ravenna, Italy
- Height: 1.83 m (6 ft 0 in)
- Weight: 75 kg (165 lb)
- Spike: 342 cm (135 in)
- Block: 335 cm (132 in)

Volleyball information
- Current team: Aliannz Milano

National team
| 2021– | Italy |
Honours
Men's volleyball
Representing Italy
FIVB World Championship
| Gold medal – first place | 2022 Poland/Slovenia |
European Championship
| Gold medal – first place | 2021 Poland/Czechia/Estonia/Finland |
World University Games
| Gold medal – first place | 2021 Chengdu |

Francesco Recine (born 7 February 1999) is an Italian volleyball player who won 2021 European Championship.

== Honours ==
=== Clubs ===
  - 2022/2024 Italian Cup, with Gas Sales Bluenergy Piacenza
