= Julian Zenger =

German volleyball player (born 1997)

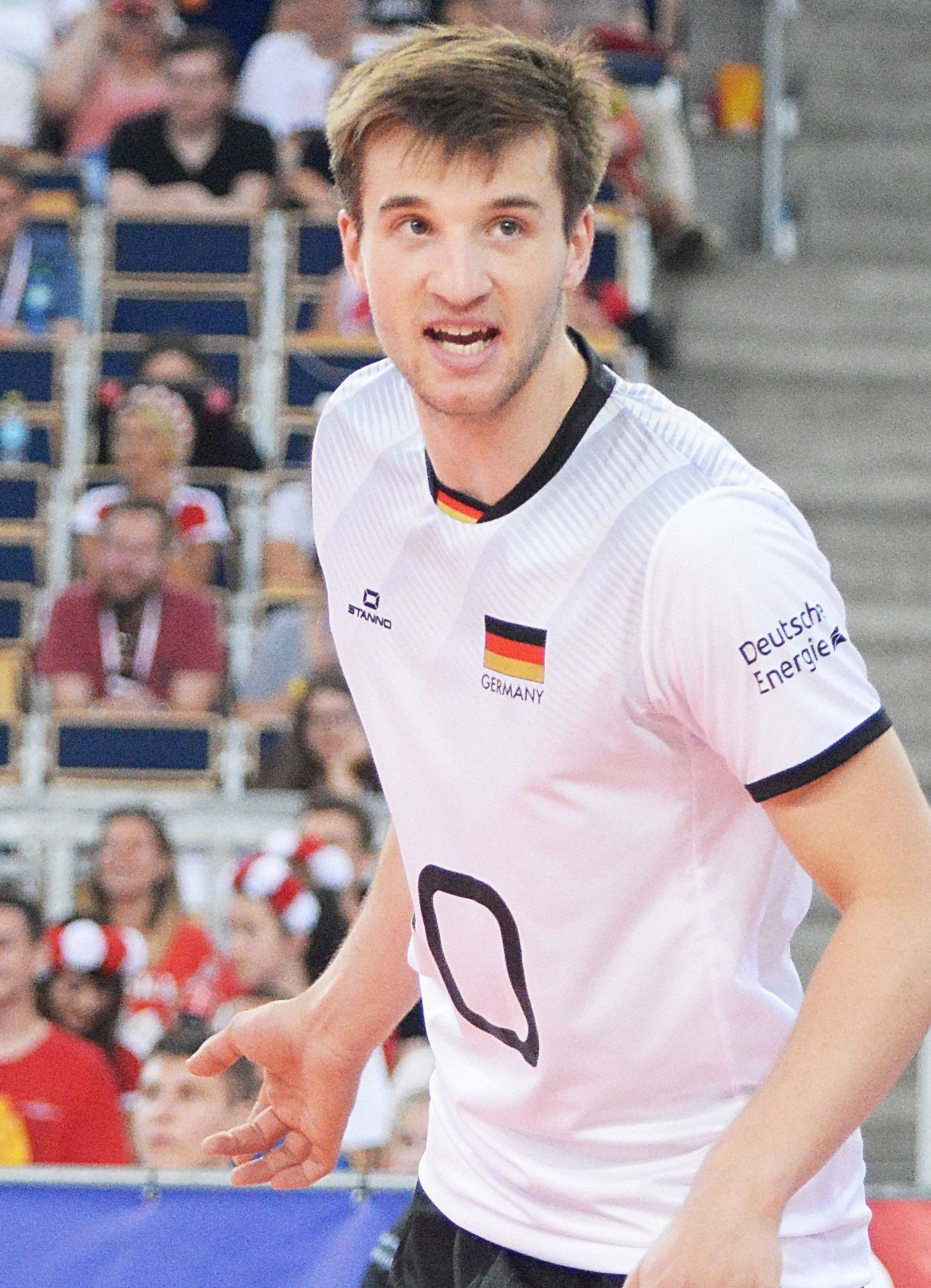

Personal information
- Born: 26 August 1997 (age 29); Wangen im Allgäu, Germany
- Height: 1.90 m (6 ft 3 in)
- Weight: 80 kg (176 lb)

Volleyball information
- Position: Libero
- Current club: Arkas İzmir
- Number: 10

Career
Years	Teams
2016–2017; 2017; 2017–2019; 2019–2021; 2021–2022; 2022–2024; 2024–	VC Olympia; VfB Friedrichshafen; United Volleys Rhein-Main; Berlin Recycling Volleys; Itas Trentino; Kioene Padova; Arkas İzmir

National team
Germany
Honours
Men's volleyball
Representing Germany
CEV European Championship
Silver medal – second place	2017 Poland

Julian Zenger (born 26 August 1997) is a German professional volleyball player who plays as a libero for Arkas İzmir and the Germany national team.

== Honours ==
=== Club ===
- CEV Champions League
  - 2021–22 – with Itas Trentino
- Domestic
  - 2019–20 German SuperCup, with Berlin Recycling Volleys
  - 2019–20 German Cup, with Berlin Recycling Volleys
  - 2020–21 German SuperCup, with Berlin Recycling Volleys
  - 2020–21 German Championship, with Berlin Recycling Volleys
  - 2021–22 Italian SuperCup, with Itas Trentino
