= Mathijs Desmet =

Belgian volleyball player (born 2000)

Personal information
- Born: 28 January 2000 (age 26); Roeselare, Belgium
- Height: 1.97 m (6 ft 6 in)

Volleyball information
- Position: Outside hitter

Career
Years	Teams
2017–2022; 2022–2024; 2024–2025; 2025–2026	Knack Roeselare; Kioene Padova; Stilon Gorzów; Knack Roeselare

National team
Belgium

Mathijs Desmet (born 28 January 2000) is a Belgian former professional volleyball player, a former member of the Belgium national team.

== Honours ==
=== Club ===
- Domestic
  - 2017–18 Belgian Cup, with Knack Roeselare
  - 2018–19 Belgian SuperCup, with Knack Roeselare
  - 2018–19 Belgian Cup, with Knack Roeselare
  - 2019–20 Belgian SuperCup, with Knack Roeselare
  - 2019–20 Belgian Cup, with Knack Roeselare
  - 2020–21 Belgian Cup, with Knack Roeselare
  - 2020–21 Belgian Championship, with Knack Roeselare
  - 2021–22 Belgian Championship, with Knack Roeselare
