= Nemanja Petrić =

Serbian volleyball player (born 1987)

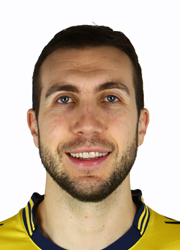

Personal information
- Nationality: Serbian
- Born: 28 July 1987 (age 39); Prijepolje, SR Serbia, SFR Yugoslavia
- Height: 2.02 m (6 ft 8 in)
- Weight: 86 kg (190 lb)
- Spike: 333 cm (131 in)
- Block: 320 cm (126 in)

Volleyball information
- Position: Outside hitter
- Current club: Spor Toto
- Number: 4

Career
Years	Teams
2007–2010; 2010–2011; 2011–2014; 2014–2017; 2017–2018; 2018–2019; 2019–2020; 2020–2021; 2021–2022; 2022–2023; 2023; 2023–2026; 2026-	Budućnost Podgorica; VC Lennik; Sir Safety Perugia; Modena Volley; Halkbank Ankara; Belogorie Belgorod; Allianz Milano; Modena Volley; Belogorie Belgorod; Emma Villas Siena; Al Ahli; Spor Toto; OK Crvena zvezda

National team
2007–	Serbia
Honours
Men's volleyball
Representing Serbia
FIVB World League
Silver medal – second place	2015 Rio de Janeiro
CEV European Championship
Gold medal – first place	2019 Belgium/France/Netherlands/Slovenia
Bronze medal – third place	2013 Denmark/Poland
Bronze medal – third place	2017 Poland

Nemanja Petrić (Serbian Cyrillic: Немања Петрић; born 28 July 1987) is a Serbian professional volleyball player. He is a member of the Serbia national team and the 2019 European Champion. At the professional club level, he plays for the Turkish team, Spor Toto.

== Career ==
=== National team ===
Petrić was in the junior and youth national teams of Serbia, and in 2009 he made his debut in the senior squad. It happened over the first weekend in the Intercontinental Round of the 2009 World League against France. On July 19, 2015 Serbian national team with him in squad went to the final of World League, but they lost with United States 0–3 and achieved silver medal.

== Honours ==
=== Club ===
- CEV Challenge Cup
  - 2018–19 – with Belogorie Belgorod
- National championships
  - 2007–08 Montenegrin Cup, with Budućnost Podgorica
  - 2007–08 Montenegrin Championship, with Budućnost Podgorica
  - 2008–09 Montenegrin Cup, with Budućnost Podgorica
  - 2014–15 Italian Cup, with Parmareggio Modena
  - 2015–16 Italian SuperCup, with DHL Modena
  - 2015–16 Italian Cup, with DHL Modena
  - 2015–16 Italian Championship, with DHL Modena
  - 2016–17 Italian SuperCup, with Azimut Modena
  - 2017–18 Turkish Cup, with Halkbank Ankara
  - 2017–18 Turkish Championship, with Halkbank Ankara
