= G.S. Porto Robur Costa =

Gruppo Sportivo Porto Robur Costa, or simply Porto Robur Costa, is an Italian men's volleyball club based in Ravenna. The club also known as Bunge Ravenna for sponsorship reasons, participates in the Serie A1 championship.

== History ==
Porto Robur Costa was founded in the summer of 2013 by the merging of two Ravenna-based clubs, Porto Ravenna Volley and Gruppo Sportivo Robur Angelo Costa. Porto Robur Costa made its debut in Serie A1 in the 2013–14 season, in which, after finished the regular season in ninth place, it won the CEV Challenge Cup play-offs, obtaining the right to participate in the competition of the same name under the name CMC Ravenna. The same situation also occurs in the 2016–17 season, qualifying for the 2017–18 CEV Challenge Cup.

== Honours ==
=== European competitions ===
- CEV Challenge Cup
  - Winners (1): 2017-18

== Team ==
Team roster – season 2017/2018
Bunge Ravenna
| No. | Name | Date of birth | Position |
|---|---|---|---|
| 1 | (Italy) Tiziano Mazzone | July 22, 1995 | outside hitter |
| 2 | (Italy) Marco Vitelli | April 4, 1996 | middle blocker |
| 5 | (Italy) Santiago Orduna | August 31, 1983 | setter |
| 6 | (Argentina) Cristian Poglajen | July 14, 1989 | outside hitter |
| 7 | (Italy) Giacomo Raffaelli | February 7, 1995 | outside hitter |
| 8 | (Italy) Matteo Pistolesi | March 14, 1995 | setter |
| 9 | (Cuba) Miguel Gutiérrez | February 21, 1997 | opposite |
| 10 | (Italy) Riccardo Goi | August 24, 1992 | libero |
| 11 | (Bulgaria) Krasimir Georgiev | February 13, 1995 | middle blocker |
| 12 | (Italy) Enrico Diamantini | April 4, 1993 | middle blocker |
| 14 | (Italy) Stefano Marchini | January 14, 1997 | libero |
| 16 | (France) Nicolas Maréchal | March 4, 1987 | outside hitter |
| 18 | (Austria) Paul Buchegger | March 4, 1996 | opposite |
Head coach: Fabio Soli; Assistant: Luigi Parisi

Team roster – season 2016/2017
Bunge Ravenna
| No. | Name | Date of birth | Position |
|---|---|---|---|
| 1 | (Italy) Simone Calarco | March 6, 1995 | outside hitter |
| 2 | (Italy) Fabio Ricci | July 11, 1994 | middle blocker |
| 4 | (United States) Conrad Kaminski | March 27, 1994 | middle blocker |
| 5 | (Italy) Giacomo Leoni | October 9, 1995 | setter |
| 6 | (Italy) Giacomo Raffaelli | February 7, 1995 | outside hitter |
| 7 | (Netherlands) Maarten Van Garderen | January 24, 1990 | outside hitter |
| 8 | (France) Julien Lyneel | April 15, 1990 | outside hitter |
| 9 | (Bulgaria) Branimir Grozdanov | May 21, 1994 | outside hitter |
| 10 | (Italy) Riccardo Goi | August 24, 1992 | libero |
| 11 | (Puerto Rico) Maurice Torres | July 6, 1991 | outside hitter |
| 12 | (Italy) Elia Bossi | August 15, 1994 | middle blocker |
| 13 | (Italy) Luca Spirito | October 30, 1993 | setter |
| 14 | (Italy) Stefano Marchini | January 14, 1997 | libero |
Head coach: Fabio Soli; Assistant: Giuseppe Patriarca
