= You Energy Volley =

Italian volleyball club

Gas Sales Bluenergy Piacenza
- Full name: Gas Sales Bluenergy Piacenza
- Nickname: The Wolves
- Founded: 2018
- Ground: PalaBanca; Piacenza, Italy (Capacity: 3,800)
- Chairman: Elisabetta Curti
- Manager: Andrea Anastasi
- League: Italian Volleyball League
- Website: Club home page

Uniforms
Home	Away

Gas Sales Bluenergy Piacenza is an Italian professional men's volleyball club based in Piacenza, northern Italy. Dedicated businessmen and citizens established a new volleyball club to embrace the rich volleyball culture in Piacenza after the city's historic club, Volley Piacenza, went bankrupt. It currently plays in the Superlega, the highest level league of Italian volleyball.

The team debuted in Serie A2 for Season 2018-19. After a successful 2018-19 season where they won the title of Serie A2, the team was promoted to Superlega.

== Achievements ==
- Italian Championship
  (×1) 2022–23
- Italian Championship Serie A2
  (×1) 2018–19
- Italian Cup Serie A2
  (×1) 2018–19
- Italian Cup SuperLega
  (×1) 2022–23
- CEV Cup
  (x1) 2026

== Team ==
Team roster – season 2022/2023

No.	Name	Date of birth	Position
1	(France) Luka Bašić	January 29, 1995 (age 31)	opposite
2	(Italy) Nicolò Hoffer	May 6, 2000 (age 25)	libero
3	(Italy) Francesco Recine	February 7, 1999 (age 27)	outside hitter
4	(Italy) Fabrizio Gironi	March 18, 2000 (age 26)	outside hitter
5	(Cuba) Roamy Alonso	July 24, 1997 (age 28)	middle blocker
6	(France) Antoine Brizard (C)	May 22, 1994 (age 31)	setter
8	(Brazil) Ricardo Lucarelli	February 14, 1992 (age 34)	outside hitter
9	(Brazil) Yoandy Leal	August 31, 1988 (age 37)	outside hitter
10	(Italy) Leonardo Scanferla	December 4, 1998 (age 27)	libero
12	(Italy) Enrico Cester	March 16, 1988 (age 38)	middle blocker
13	(Cuba) Robertlandy Simón	June 11, 1987 (age 38)	middle blocker
17	(Italy) Yuri Romanò	July 26, 1997 (age 28)	opposite
18	(Italy) Edoardo Caneschi	January 26, 1997 (age 29)	middle blocker
19	(Netherlands) Freek De Weijer	October 30, 1995 (age 30)	setter
Head coach: (Italy) Lorenzo Bernardi; Assistant: (Italy) Massimo Botti

Team roster – season 2021–2022
No.	Name	Date of birth	Position
1	(Turkey) Adis Lagumdžija	March 29, 1999 (age 27)	opposite
2	(United States) Aaron Russell	June 4, 1993 (age 32)	outside hitter
3	(Italy) Francesco Recine	February 7, 1999 (age 27)	outside hitter
4	(Italy) Damiano Catania	March 28, 2001 (age 25)	libero
5	(Slovenia) Tonček Štern	November 14, 1995 (age 30)	opposite
6	(France) Antoine Brizard (C)	May 22, 1994 (age 31)	setter
7	(Italy) Alessandro Tondo	August 18, 1991 (age 34)	middle blocker
8	(Italy) Oleg Antonov	July 28, 1988 (age 37)	outside hitter
9	(France) Thibault Rossard	August 28, 1993 (age 32)	outside hitter
10	(Italy) Leonardo Scanferla	December 4, 1998 (age 27)	libero
12	(Italy) Enrico Cester	March 16, 1988 (age 38)	middle blocker
13	(France) Pierre Pujol	July 13, 1984 (age 41)	setter
14	(United States) Max Holt	March 12, 1987 (age 39)	middle blocker
18	(Italy) Edoardo Caneschi	January 26, 1997 (age 29)	middle blocker
Head coach: (Italy) Lorenzo Bernardi

Team roster – season 2020–2021
Gas Sales Bluenergy Volley Piacenza
No.	Name	Date of birth	Position
1	(Italy) Alberto Polo	September 7, 1995	middle blocker
2	(United States) Aaron Russell	June 4, 1993	outside hitter
3	(Italy) Marco Izzo	November 17, 1994	setter
4	(Italy) Leonardo Scanferla	December 4, 1998	libero
5	(Italy) Davide Candellaro	June 7, 1899	middle blocker
7	(Italy) Alessandro Tondo	August 18, 1991	middle blocker
8	(Italy) Oleg Antonov	July 28, 1988	outside hitter
9	(Germany) Georg Grozer	November 27, 1984	opposite
10	(Italy) Iacopo Botto	September 22, 1987	outside hitter
13	(United States) James Shaw	March 5, 1994	opposite
14	(Cuba) Raydel Hierrezuelo	July 14, 1987	setter
15	(Italy) Fabio Fanuli	February 10, 1985	libero
17	(France) Trevor Clévenot (C)	June 28, 1994	outside hitter
21	(Iran) Mohammad Mousavi	August 22, 1987	middle blocker
23	(Czech Republic) Michal Finger	September 2, 1993	opposite
25	(Italy) Michele Baranowicz	August 5, 1989	setter
Head coach: (Italy) Alberto Giuliani; Assistant: (Italy) Francesco Cadeddu

Team roster – season 2019–2020
Gas Sales Piacenza
No.	Name	Date of birth	Position
1	(Italy) Riccardo Copelli	March 16, 1996	middle blocker
2	(Italy) Leonardo Scanferla	December 4, 1998	libero
3	(Italy) Alessandro Fei (C)	November 29, 1978	opposite
4	(Argentina) Maximiliano Cavanna	July 2, 1988	setter
5	(Netherlands) Dick Kooy	December 3, 1987	outside hitter
6	(Australia) Igor Yudin	June 17, 1987	outside hitter
7	(Serbia) Dragan Stanković	October 18, 1985	middle blocker
9	(Italy) Iacopo Botto	September 22, 1987	outside hitter
10	(Italy) Matteo Paris	September 13, 1983	setter
12	(Austria) Alexander Berger	September 27, 1988	outside hitter
14	(Italy) Alessandro Tondo	August 18, 1991	middle blocker
15	(Italy) Fabio Fanuli	February 10, 1985	libero
18	(Italy) Matteo Pistolesi	March 14, 1995	setter
20	(Italy) Gabriele Nelli	December 4, 1993	opposite
21	(Serbia) Petar Krsmanović	June 21, 1990	middle blocker
Head coach: (Italy) Andrea Gardini; Assistant: (Italy) Fabio Storti

== Notable players ==
- 2021–2022 (United States) Maxwell Holt
- 2020–2022 (Italy) Oleg Antonov
- 2020–2022 (United States) Aaron Russell
- 2020–2021 (Iran) Mohammad Mousavi
- 2021–2022 (Slovenia) Tonček Štern
- 2021–2022 (France) Thibault Rossard
