= Maarten van Garderen =

Dutch volleyball player (born 1990)

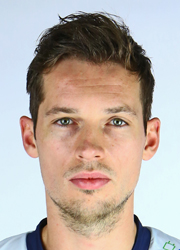

Personal information
- Born: 24 January 1990 (age 36); Renswoude, Netherlands
- Height: 2.00 m (6 ft 7 in)
- Weight: 89 kg (196 lb)
- Spike: 346 cm (136 in)
- Block: 335 cm (132 in)

Volleyball information
- Position: Outside hitter
- Current club: Panathinaikos
- Number: 3

Career
Years	Teams
2006–2011; 2011–2012; 2012–2013; 2013–2014; 2014–2015; 2015–2017; 2017–2018; 2018–2019; 2019–2020; 2020–2021; 2021–2022; 2022–2023; 2023–2024; 2024–	SSS Barneveld; Orion Doetinchem; Corigliano Volley; Beauvais Oise UC; VfB Friedrichshafen; Porto Robur Costa; Modena Volley; Trentino Volley; Top Volley Cisterna; Ziraat Bankası Ankara; Modena Volley; Emma Villas Volley; PAOK Thessaloniki; Panathinaikos

National team
2012–	Netherlands
Honours
Men's volleyball
Representing Netherlands
European League
Gold medal – first place	2012 Turkey
Bronze medal – third place	2019 Estonia

Maarten Van Garderen (born 24 January 1990) is a Dutch professional volleyball player who plays as an outside hitter for Panathinaikos and the Netherlands national team.

== Honours ==
=== Club ===
- FIVB Club World Championship
  - Poland 2018 – with Trentino Volley
- CEV Cup
  - 2018–19 – with Itas Trentino
- CEV Challenge Cup
  - 2020–21 – with Ziraat Bankası Ankara
- Domestic
  - 2011–12 Dutch Championship, with Orion Doetinchem
  - 2014–15 German Cup, with VfB Friedrichshafen
  - 2014–15 German Championship, with VfB Friedrichshafen
  - 2020–21 Turkish Championship, with Ziraat Bankası Ankara
  - 2023–24 Greek SuperCup, with PAOK Thessaloniki
