= Tobias Krick =

German volleyball player (born 1998)

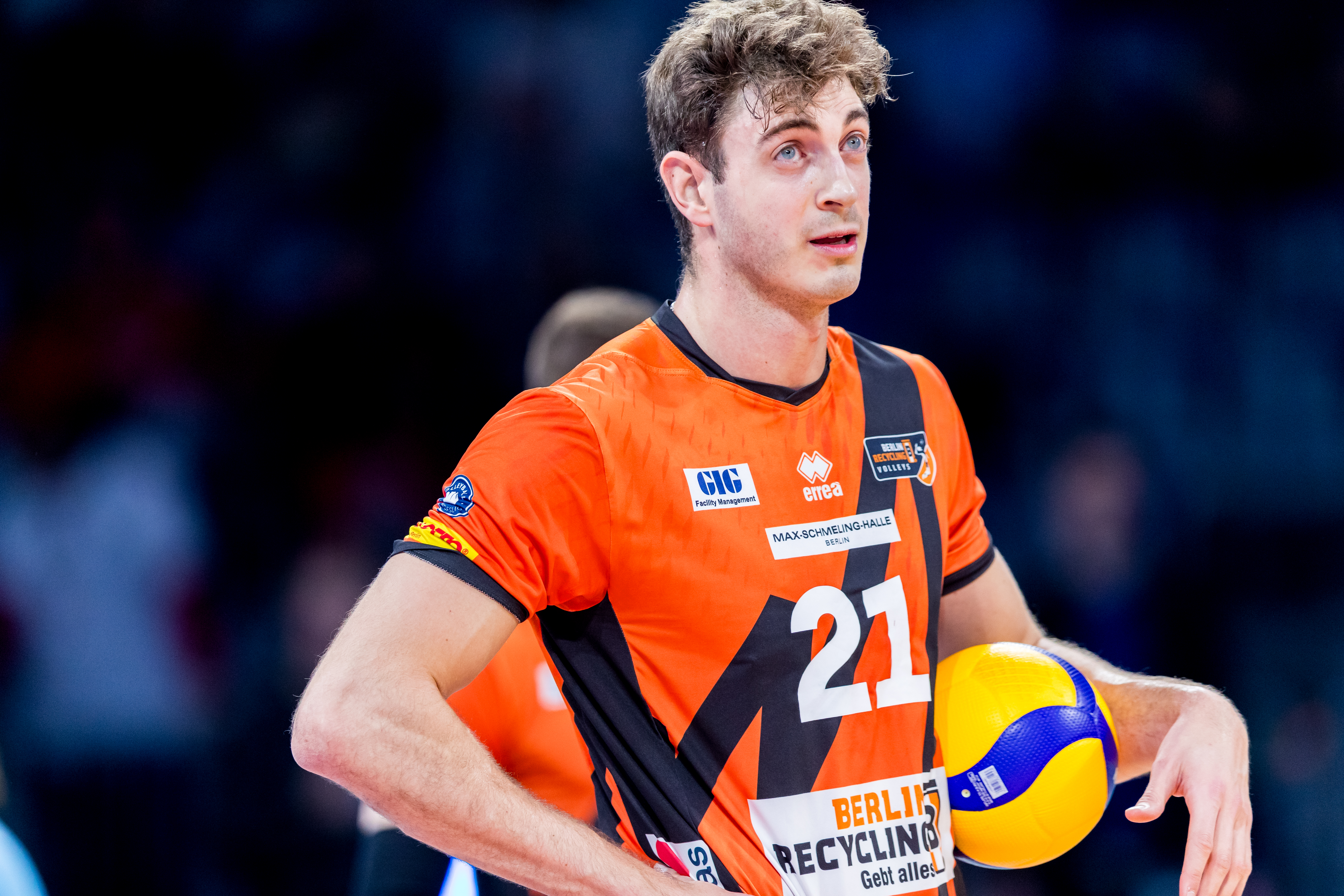
- Krick in 2024

Personal information
- Born: 22 October 1998 (age 28) Bingen am Rhein, Germany
- Height: 2.13 m (7 ft 0 in)
- Weight: 112 kg (247 lb)
- Spike: 360 cm (142 in)
- Block: 340 cm (134 in)

Volleyball information
- Position: Middle blocker
- Current club: AO Kalamata 1980
- Number: 21

Career
- Years: Team
- 2015–2020 2020–2022 2022–2023 2023–2025 2026–: United Volleys Frankfurt; Top Volley Cisterna; Modena Volley; Berlin Recycling Volleys; AO Kalamata 1980

National team
- Years: Team
- –: Germany
Honours
Men's volleyball
Representing Germany
CEV European Championship
Silver medal – second place	2017 Poland

Tobias Krick (born 22 October 1998) is a German professional volleyball player who plays as a middle blocker for AO Kalamata 1980 and the Germany national team.

== Honours ==
=== Club ===
- CEV Cup
  - 2022–23 – with Valsa Group Modena
- Domestic
  - 2023–24 German SuperCup, with Berlin Recycling Volleys
  - 2023–24 German Cup, with Berlin Recycling Volleys
  - 2023–24 German Championship, with Berlin Recycling Volleys
  - 2024–25 German SuperCup, with Berlin Recycling Volleys
  - 2024–25 German Cup, with Berlin Recycling Volleys
  - 2024–25 German Championship, with Berlin Recycling Volleys
