= 2022–23 Italian Volleyball Cup =

Italian volleyball competition

2022–23 Italian Cup
Tournament details
- Dates: Quarterfinals: 28–29 December 2022; Final four: 25–26 February 2023
- Teams: 8
- Venue: PalaEur (in Roma host cities)

Final positions
- Champions: Gas Sales Bluenergy Piacenza (1st title)
- Runners-up: Itas Trentino

Tournament awards
- MVP: (Brazil) Yoandy Leal

Tournament statistics
- Matches played: 7
- Attendance: 32,561 (4,652 per match)

The Del Monte Italian Cup 2022–23 is the 45th edition of the tournament. The tournament is divided into two phases. Quarter finals started from 28 to 29 December 2022 while Final four will start on 25 to 26 February 2023. After eleven years, the Final four returns to Roma at the PalaEur.

== Format ==
The top eight teams of Leg 1 from Regular season to take part in a knockout phase with the better ranked team as home teams.

== Teams ==
Ranking is based on the end of first leg as of 11 December 2022.

Teams	Qualified as
Sir Safety Susa Perugia	1st ranked of Regular Round of 2022–23 SuperLega
Cucine Lube Civitanova	2nd ranked of Regular Round of 2022–23 SuperLega
Valsa Group Modena	3rd ranked of Regular Round of 2022–23 SuperLega
WithU Verona	4th ranked of Regular Round of 2022–23 SuperLega
Gas Sales Bluenergy Piacenza	5th ranked of Regular Round of 2022–23 SuperLega
Itas Trentino	6th ranked of Regular Round of 2022–23 SuperLega
Allianz Milano	7th ranked of Regular Round of 2022–23 SuperLega
Top Volley Cisterna	8th ranked of Regular Round of 2022–23 SuperLega

== Tournament ==
- All times are local, CET (UTC+01:00).

Quarterfinals
29 December
Sir Safety Susa Perugia	3
Top Volley Cisterna	0
29 December
WithU Verona	2
Gas Sales Bluenergy Piacenza	3
29 December
Cucine Lube Civitanova	1
Allianz Milano	3
28 December
Valsa Group Modena	1
Itas Trentino	3

Semifinals
25 February
Sir Safety Susa Perugia	0
Gas Sales Bluenergy Piacenza	3
25 February
Allianz Milano	2
Itas Trentino	3

Final
26 February
Gas Sales Bluenergy Piacenza	3
Itas Trentino	0

=== Quarterfinals ===
Date	Time		Score		Set 1	Set 2	Set 3	Set 4	Set 5	Total	Report
29 Dec	20:30	Sir Safety Susa Perugia	3–0	Top Volley Cisterna	25–18	25–18	25–23			75–59	Report
29 Dec	20:30	WithU Verona	2–3	Gas Sales Bluenergy Piacenza	19–25	33–31	22–25	25–21	8–15	107–117	Report
29 Dec	20:30	Cucine Lube Civitanova	1–3	Allianz Milano	25–18	21–25	18–25	21–25		85–93	Report
28 Dec	20:30	Valsa Group Modena	1–3	Itas Trentino	25–17	26–28	22–25	20–25		93–95	Report

=== Semifinals ===
Date	Time		Score		Set 1	Set 2	Set 3	Set 4	Set 5	Total	Report
25 Feb	15:30	Sir Safety Susa Perugia	0–3	Gas Sales Bluenergy Piacenza	28–30	20–25	20–25			68–80	Report
25 Feb	18:00	Allianz Milano	2–3	Itas Trentino	35–33	25–22	19–25	16–25	9–15	104–120	Report

=== Final ===
Date	Time		Score		Set 1	Set 2	Set 3	Set 4	Set 5	Total	Report
26 Feb	16:00	Gas Sales Bluenergy Piacenza	3–0	Itas Trentino	25–22	25–17	25–23			75–62	Report

== Final standings ==
Rank	Team
1st place, gold medalist(s)	Gas Sales Bluenergy Piacenza
2nd place, silver medalist(s)	Itas Trentino

== See also ==
- 2022–23 SuperLega
- Super Cup 2022
