= Federico Pereyra (volleyball) =

Argentine volleyball player (born 1988)

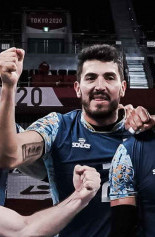
- Pereyra in 2021

Personal information
- Born: 19 June 1988 (age 38) San Juan, Argentina
- Height: 200 cm (6 ft 7 in)

Sport
- Sport: Volleyball
Medal record
Olympic Games
Bronze medal – third place	2020 Tokyo	Team

Federico Pereyra (born 19 June 1988) is an Argentine volleyball player and two-time Olympian. He competed in the 2020 Summer Olympics, where he won a bronze medal. He also competed in the 2012 Summer Olympics.
