= Fabio Soli =

Italianvolleyball coach (born 1979)

Personal information
- Nationality: Italian
- Born: 28 September 1979 (age 47) Formigine, Italy

Fabio Soli (Formigine, Italy, 28 September 1979) is an Italian volleyball coach and former player. He is the head coach of the Slovenia men's national volleyball team since 2025, and he coaches the Italian club, Verona Volley.

== Coaching career ==
Soli began his coaching career in 2011 as an assistant coach at the team, Modena Volley. He later moved to Turkey and worked in Fenerbahçe. After his career to Turkey, he returned to Italy, where he coached several clubs, including Sora, Porto Robur Costa, Monza and Top Volley (Cisterna).

He left away from volleyball coaching for a period of time. Then, Soli returned to the coaching and in the 2021–22 season he coached the club, Top Volley Latina. In January 2022, he was also appointed as the head coach of the Estonia men's national volleyball team.

From 2023 to 2025, Soli coached in Italy the club of Trentino Volley, which finally won the CEV Champions League in 2024. He led them also to the Italian championship in 2025.

In February 2025, Soli was invited to work on abroad and was appointed as the head coach of the Slovenia men's national volleyball team. Simultaneously, in May 2025, Soli was appointed as Verona Volley head coach.

In September 2026, Soli led the National Team of Slovenia to the best-4 teams at the 2026 European Volleyball Championship, held in Italy. Eventually, they lost 3-0 to Poland in the semifinal.

== Honours ==
=== As a player ===
- CEV Challenge Cup: 1
  - 2007–08

=== As a coach ===
- * Italian Championship: 1
  - 2024–25
- Coppa Italia: 1
  - 2025–26
- Turkish Volleyball Super Cup: 1
  - 2012
- CEV Champions League: 1
  - 2023–24
- CEV Challenge Cup: 1
  - 2017–18
