= Giacomo Raffaelli (volleyball) =

Italian volleyball player (born 1995)

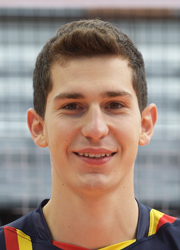

Personal information
- Nationality: Italian
- Born: February 7, 1995 (age 31)
- Height: 198 cm (6 ft 6 in)
- Weight: 95 kg (209 lb)
- Spike: 338 cm (133 in)
- Block: 330 cm (130 in)

Volleyball information
- Number: 3 (national team)

Career
Years	Teams
2015	Emma Villas

National team
2015	Italy

Giacomo Raffaelli (born 7 February 1995) is an Italian male volleyball player. He is part of the Italy men's national volleyball team. On club level he plays for Emma Villas.
