= Fabio Ricci =

Italian volleyball player (born 1994)

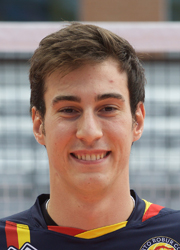

Personal information
- Nationality: Italian
- Born: 11 July 1994 (age 32); Faenza, Italy
- Height: 2.05 m (6 ft 9 in)
- Weight: 92 kg (203 lb)
- Spike: 348 cm (137 in)
- Block: 328 cm (129 in)

Volleyball information
- Position: Middle blocker
- Current club: Sir Safety Perugia
- Number: 2

Career
Years	Teams
2011–2012; 2012–2013; 2013–2017; 2017–	Donaticmc Port Ravenna; Cucine Lube Banca Macerata; Bunge Ravenna; Sir Safety Perugia

National team
2015–	Italy
Honours
Men's volleyball
Representing Italy
World Grand Champions Cup
Silver medal – second place	2017 Japan
CEV European Championship
Gold medal – first place	2021 Poland/Czechia/Estonia/Finland
- Last updated: 2 January 2018

Fabio Ricci (born 11 July 1994) is an Italian volleyball player for Bunge Ravenna and the Italian national team.

He participated at the 2017 Men's European Volleyball Championship.
