= 2015–16 Men's Volleyball Serie A1 squads =

This article shows the rosters of all participating teams at the 2015–16 Men's Volleyball Serie A1 in Italy.

== Calzedonia Verona ==
The following is the Calzedonia Verona roster in the 2015–16 Men's Volleyball Serie A1.

Head coach:	Andrea Giani
Assistant:	Matteo De Cecco
Athletic trainer:	Berti Oscar
Scoutman:	Paolo Rossi
Doctors:	Roberto Filippini; Anselmo Pallone; Claudio Zorzi
Physiotherapists:	Leo Arici; Michele De Biasi

No.	Name	Date of birth	Position
1	(Australia) Aidan Zingel	November 19, 1990 (age 34)	middle blocker
2	(Serbia) Uroš Kovačević	May 6, 1993 (age 31)	outside hitter
3	(Italy) Nicola Pesaresi	February 11, 1991 (age 34)	libero
4	(Italy) Carmelo Gitto	July 3, 1987 (age 37)	middle blocker
5	(Belgium) François Lecat	April 19, 1993 (age 31)	outside hitter
6	(Italy) Luca Spirito	October 30, 1997 (age 27)	setter
7	(Italy) Thomas Frigo	May 19, 1997 (age 27)	libero
8	(Italy) Michele Baranowicz	August 5, 1989 (age 35)	setter
10	(Serbia) Saša Starović	October 19, 1988 (age 36)	opposite
13	(Italy) Giacomo Bellei	February 7, 1988 (age 37)	outside hitter
15	(United States) Taylor Sander	March 17, 1992 (age 33)	outside hitter
17	(Italy) Simone Anzani	January 6, 1995 (age 30)	middle blocker
18	(Poland) Bartosz Bućko	August 29, 1987 (age 37)	outside hitter

== CMC Romagna ==
The following is the CMC Romagna roster in the 2015–16 Men's Volleyball Serie A1.

== Cucine Lube Civitanova ==
The following is the Cucine Lube Civitanova roster in the 2015–16 Men's Volleyball Serie A1.

Head coach:	Gianlorenzo Blengini
Assistant:	Gianfranco D'Amico
Coach of physical preparation:	Massimo Merazzi
Scoutman:	Matteo Carancini
Manager:	Claudio Leonardi

No.	Name	Date of birth	Position
1	(Italy) Alessandro Fei	November 29, 1978 (age 46)	opposite
3	(Italy) Simone Parodi	July 16, 1986 (age 38)	outside hitter
5	(Italy) Osmany Juantorena	June 12, 1986 (age 38)	outside hitter
7	(Serbia) Dragan Stanković	October 18, 1986 (age 38)	middle blocker
8	(United States) William Priddy	January 10, 1977 (age 48)	outside hitter
9	(Italy) Jiří Kovář	April 10, 1989 (age 35)	outside hitter
11	(United States) Micah Christenson	May 8, 1993 (age 31)	setter
12	(Italy) Enrico Cester	March 16, 1988 (age 37)	middle blocker
13	(France) Jenia Grebennikov	August 13, 1990 (age 34)	libero
14	(Serbia) Ivan Miljković	September 13, 1979 (age 45)	opposite
15	(Italy) Antonio Corvetta	August 28, 1977 (age 47)	setter
16	(Slovenia) Klemen Čebulj	February 21, 1992 (age 33)	outside hitter
18	(Serbia) Marko Podraščanin	August 29, 1987 (age 37)	middle blocker

== DHL Modena ==
The following is the DHL Modena roster in the 2015–16 Men's Volleyball Serie A1.

Head Coach:	Angelo Lorenzetti
Assistant:	Lorenzo Tubertini
Coach of physical preparation:	Juan Carlos De Lellis
Scoutman:	Roberto Ciamarra
Doctor:	Lorenzo Segre
	Luigi Tarallo
Physiotherapist:	Giovanni Adamo

No.	Name	Date of birth	Position
1	(Brazil) Bruno Rezende	July 2, 1986 (age 38)	setter
2	(Italy) Fabio Donadio	April 30, 1988 (age 36)	libero
4	(Serbia) Nemanja Petrić	July 28, 1987 (age 37)	outside hitter
5	(Italy) Pietro Soli	September 15, 1994 (age 30)	setter
6	(Italy) Alberto Casadei	February 6, 1984 (age 41)	opposite
7	(Italy) Salvatore Rossini	July 13, 1986 (age 38)	libero
8	(Italy) Luca Sartoretti	November 20, 1995 (age 29)	outside hitter
9	(France) Earvin N'Gapeth	February 12, 1991 (age 34)	outside hitter
10	(Serbia) Miloš Nikić	March 31, 1986 (age 38)	outside hitter
11	(Italy) Matteo Piano	October 24, 1990 (age 34)	middle blocker
12	(Italy) Elia Bossi	August 15, 1994 (age 30)	middle blocker
14	(Nigeria) Samuel Onwelo	April 18, 1997 (age 27)	opposite
15	(Brazil) Thiago Sens	July 2, 1985 (age 39)	outside hitter
16	(Brazil) Lucas Saatkamp	March 6, 1986 (age 39)	middle blocker
17	(Italy) Luca Vettori	April 26, 1991 (age 33)	opposite
18	(Italy) Nicholas Sighinolfi	August 11, 1994 (age 30)	middle blocker

== Diatec Trentino ==
The following is the Diatec Trentino roster in the 2015–16 Men's Volleyball Serie A1.

Head coach:	Radostin Stoychev
Assistant:	Dario Simoni
Coach of physical preparation:	Mario Poeder
Scoutman:	Ivan Contrario
Doctor:	Mauro Bertoluzza
Physiotherapists:	Davide Lama
Manager:	Riccardo Michieletto

No.	Name	Date of birth	Position
1	(Bulgaria) Matey Kaziyski	September 23, 1984 (age 40)	outside hitter
2	(Italy) Gabriele Nelli	December 4, 1993 (age 31)	opposite
4	(Italy) Oleg Antonov	July 28, 1988 (age 36)	outside hitter
6	(Bulgaria) Georgi Bratoev	October 21, 1987 (age 37)	setter
8	(Italy) Carlo De Angelis	January 10, 1996 (age 29)	libero
9	(Italy) Simone Giannelli	August 9, 1996 (age 28)	setter
10	(Italy) Filippo Lanza	March 3, 1991 (age 34)	outside hitter
11	(Argentina) Sebastian Solé	June 12, 1991 (age 33)	middle blocker
12	(Greece) Mitar Tzourits	April 25, 1989 (age 35)	opposite
13	(Italy) Massimo Colaci	February 21, 1985 (age 40)	libero
14	(Belgium) Simon Van De Voorde	December 19, 1989 (age 35)	middle blocker
16	(Italy) Tiziano Mazzone	July 22, 1995 (age 29)	outside hitter
17	(Slovenia) Tine Urnaut	September 3, 1988 (age 36)	outside hitter
18	(Italy) Daniele Mazzone	June 4, 1992 (age 32)	middle blocker

== Exprivia Molfetta ==
The following is the Exprivia Molfetta roster in the 2015–16 Men's Volleyball Serie A1.

== Gi Group Monza ==
The following is the Gi Group Monza roster in the 2015–16 Men's Volleyball Serie A1.

== LPR Piacenza ==
The following is the LPR Piacenza roster in the 2015–16 Men's Volleyball Serie A1.

Head Coach:	Alberto Giuliani
Assistant:	Marco Camperi
Coach of physical preparation:	Leondino Giombini
Scoutman:	Roberto Di Maio
Doctor:	Bernardo Palladini
Physiotherapist:	Alessandro Russo

No.	Name	Date of birth	Position
1	(Italy) Loris Manià	January 27, 1979 (age 46)	libero
2	(Italy) Manuel Coscione	January 29, 1980 (age 45)	outside hitter
3	(Slovakia) Emanuel Kohút	July 21, 1982 (age 42)	middle blocker
4	(Netherlands) Thijs ter Horst	September 18, 1991 (age 33)	universal
5	(Egypt) Mohamed Fahmy	February 11, 1992 (age 33)	setter
6	(Italy) Samuele Papi	May 20, 1973 (age 51)	outside hitter
7	(Croatia) Marko Sedlaček	July 29, 1996 (age 28)	outside hitter
8	(Italy) Stefano Patriarca	July 29, 1987 (age 37)	middle blocker
11	(Bulgaria) / (Italy) Hristo Zlatanov	April 21, 1976 (age 48)	outside hitter
12	(Serbia) Dražen Luburić	November 2, 1993 (age 31)	universal
13	(Italy) Luca Tencati	March 16, 1979 (age 46)	middle blocker
15	(Portugal) Miguel Rodrigues	March 2, 1993 (age 32)	setter
18	(Italy) Francesco Cottarelli	October 16, 1996 (age 28)	setter

== Ninfa Latina ==
The following is the Ninfa Latina roster in the 2015–16 Men's Volleyball Serie A1.

== Revivre Milano ==
The following is the Revivre Milano roster in the 2015–16 Men's Volleyball Serie A1.

== Sir Safety Conad Perugia ==
The following is the Sir Safety Conad Perugia roster in the 2015–16 Men's Volleyball Serie A1.

Head Coach:	Daniel Castellani (2015–Dec 2015) / Slobodan Kovac (Dec 2015–2016)
Assistant:	Carmine Fontana
Coach of physical preparation:	Massimo Ciucci
	Giovani Foppa
Scoutman:	Gianluca Carloncelli
	Francesco Monopoli
Doctor:	Daniele Checcarelli
	Giuseppe Sabatino
Physiotherapist:	Mauro Proietti

No.	Name	Date of birth	Position
1	(Italy) Simone Buti	September 19, 1983 (age 41)	middle blocker
2	(Germany) Christian Fromm	August 15, 1990 (age 34)	outside hitter
3	(United States) Samuel Holt	June 20, 1993 (age 31)	outside hitter
5	(Argentina) Luciano De Cecco	June 2, 1988 (age 36)	setter
6	(Germany) Denis Kaliberda	August 24, 1990 (age 34)	outside hitter
7	(Italy) Andrea Giovi	August 19, 1983 (age 41)	libero
8	(United States) Aaron Russell	June 4, 1993 (age 31)	outside hitter
9	(Bulgaria) Dobromir Dimitrov	July 7, 1991 (age 33)	setter
10	(Greece) Georgios Tzioumakas	January 23, 1995 (age 30)	opposite
11	(Italy) Alberto Elia	August 12, 1985 (age 39)	middle blocker
12	(Italy) Alessandro Franceschini	June 21, 1983 (age 41)	middle blocker
14	(Serbia) Aleksandar Atanasijević	September 4, 1991 (age 33)	opposite
15	(Italy) Fabio Fanuli	February 10, 1985 (age 40)	libero
18	(Italy) Emanuele Birarelli	January 8, 1981 (age 44)	middle blocker

== Tonazzo Padova ==
The following is the Tonazzo Padova roster in the 2015–16 Men's Volleyball Serie A1.
