= 2015 FIVB Volleyball Men's U21 World Championship squads =

This article shows the rosters of all participating teams at the 2015 FIVB Volleyball Men's U21 World Championship in Mexico.

== Argentina ==
The following is the Argentinean roster in the 2015 FIVB Volleyball Men's U21 World Championship.

Head coach: Alejandro Grossi

No.	Name	Date of birth	Height	Weight	Spike	Block	2015 club
1	Matias Sanchez	20 September 1996	1.73 m (5 ft 8 in)	72 kg (159 lb)	306 cm (120 in)	290 cm (110 in)	(Argentina) Club Obras De San Juan
2	Brian Melgarejo	28 March 1995	1.91 m (6 ft 3 in)	88 kg (194 lb)	336 cm (132 in)	316 cm (124 in)	(Argentina) Club Ciudad de Buenos Aires
3	Ramiro Nielson	13 May 1996	1.91 m (6 ft 3 in)	86 kg (190 lb)	321 cm (126 in)	301 cm (119 in)	(Argentina) Club Obras de San Juan
4	Joaquin Gallego	21 November 1996	2.02 m (6 ft 8 in)	102 kg (225 lb)	339 cm (133 in)	319 cm (126 in)	(Argentina) Club Ciudad De Bolívar
6	Edgar Vieira	8 February 1995	2.02 m (6 ft 8 in)	95 kg (209 lb)	342 cm (135 in)	322 cm (127 in)	(Argentina) Club Velez Sarsfield
7	Ignacio Luengas	28 January 1996	2.00 m (6 ft 7 in)	73 kg (161 lb)	336 cm (132 in)	316 cm (124 in)	(Argentina) Club Vélez Sarsfield
8	Gaspar Bitar	19 November 1995	1.83 m (6 ft 0 in)	72 kg (159 lb)	328 cm (129 in)	308 cm (121 in)	(Argentina) Club Italiano
9	Santiago Danani	12 December 1995	1.76 m (5 ft 9 in)	76 kg (168 lb)	318 cm (125 in)	300 cm (120 in)	(Argentina) Club de Amigos
10	Nicolás Lazo	16 April 1995	1.92 m (6 ft 4 in)	90 kg (200 lb)	339 cm (133 in)	317 cm (125 in)	(Argentina) UPCN San Juan Volley
11	Gaston Fernandez (C)	4 August 1995	2.03 m (6 ft 8 in)	101 kg (223 lb)	339 cm (133 in)	317 cm (125 in)	(Argentina) Club Ciudad de Buenos Aires
12	Bruno Lima	4 February 1996	1.98 m (6 ft 6 in)	85 kg (187 lb)	341 cm (134 in)	320 cm (130 in)	(Argentina) Club Obras De San Juan
16	German Johansen	2 September 1995	2.00 m (6 ft 7 in)	79 kg (174 lb)	354 cm (139 in)	333 cm (131 in)	(Argentina) Club De Amigos

== Brazil ==
The following is the Brazilian roster in the 2015 FIVB Volleyball Men's U21 World Championship.

Head coach: Leonardo Seixas

No.	Name	Date of birth	Height	Weight	Spike	Block	2015 club
1	Leonardo Nascimento	16 March 1995	1.99 m (6 ft 6 in)	87 kg (192 lb)	338 cm (133 in)	316 cm (124 in)	(Brazil) Sada/Cruzeiro
4	Rogério Carvalho	20 February 1995	1.66 m (5 ft 5 in)	65 kg (143 lb)	302 cm (119 in)	245 cm (96 in)	(Brazil) Maringá Volei
6	Robert Araujo	10 March 1996	2.03 m (6 ft 8 in)	93 kg (205 lb)	359 cm (141 in)	325 cm (128 in)	(Brazil) Minas T.C.
7	Pedro Silva	24 September 1995	1.92 m (6 ft 4 in)	81 kg (179 lb)	331 cm (130 in)	312 cm (123 in)	(Brazil) Taubaté Vôlei
11	Rodrigo Leão	5 June 1996	1.98 m (6 ft 6 in)	79 kg (174 lb)	341 cm (134 in)	321 cm (126 in)	(Brazil) Sada/Cruzeiro
12	Douglas Souza	20 August 1995	1.99 m (6 ft 6 in)	75 kg (165 lb)	338 cm (133 in)	317 cm (125 in)	(Brazil) Sesi-SP
13	Johan Marengoni	10 January 1995	2.04 m (6 ft 8 in)	84 kg (185 lb)	337 cm (133 in)	320 cm (130 in)	(Brazil) Sesi-SP
14	Fernando Kreling (C)	13 January 1996	1.85 m (6 ft 1 in)	90 kg (200 lb)	319 cm (126 in)	301 cm (119 in)	(Brazil) Sada/Cruzeiro
15	Caio Oliveira	23 January 1996	1.97 m (6 ft 6 in)	78 kg (172 lb)	340 cm (130 in)	317 cm (125 in)	(Brazil) São Bernardo
16	Gabriel Kavalkievicz	25 December 1996	1.91 m (6 ft 3 in)	80 kg (180 lb)	336 cm (132 in)	315 cm (124 in)	(Brazil) Sesi-SP
18	Lucas Madaloz	21 December 1995	1.97 m (6 ft 6 in)	83 kg (183 lb)	341 cm (134 in)	312 cm (123 in)	(Brazil) Minas T.C.
20	Romulo Silva	13 March 1995	1.99 m (6 ft 6 in)	86 kg (190 lb)	333 cm (131 in)	315 cm (124 in)	(Brazil) Sada/Cruzeiro

== Canada ==
The following is the Canadian roster in the 2015 FIVB Volleyball Men's U21 World Championship.

Head coach: John Barrett

No.	Name	Date of birth	Height	Weight	Spike	Block	2015 club
1	Gabriel Chancy	19 October 1995	1.85 m (6 ft 1 in)	70 kg (150 lb)	326 cm (128 in)	307 cm (121 in)	Team Canada
2	Brandon Koppers	9 September 1995	2.00 m (6 ft 7 in)	90 kg (200 lb)	345 cm (136 in)	331 cm (130 in)	Team Canada
4	Blake Scheerhoorn	6 January 1995	2.02 m (6 ft 8 in)	90 kg (200 lb)	359 cm (141 in)	342 cm (135 in)	Team Canada
5	Lucas Coleman	14 January 1995	1.90 m (6 ft 3 in)	82 kg (181 lb)	345 cm (136 in)	324 cm (128 in)	Team Canada
6	Ryan Nickifor (C)	19 January 1995	1.99 m (6 ft 6 in)	86 kg (190 lb)	346 cm (136 in)	311 cm (122 in)	Team Canada
7	Arthur Szwarc	30 March 1995	2.07 m (6 ft 9 in)	97 kg (214 lb)	356 cm (140 in)	335 cm (132 in)	Team Canada
8	Andrew Richards	21 April 1995	1.90 m (6 ft 3 in)	83 kg (183 lb)	348 cm (137 in)	320 cm (130 in)	Team Canada
9	Olivier Riopel	26 June 1996	1.81 m (5 ft 11 in)	75 kg (165 lb)	332 cm (131 in)	306 cm (120 in)	Team Canada
10	Byron Keturakis	11 January 1996	2.00 m (6 ft 7 in)	88 kg (194 lb)	348 cm (137 in)	323 cm (127 in)	Team Canada
13	Arran Chambers	12 April 1995	2.02 m (6 ft 8 in)	93 kg (205 lb)	348 cm (137 in)	317 cm (125 in)	Team Canada
14	Keith West	15 July 1995	1.94 m (6 ft 4 in)	96 kg (212 lb)	341 cm (134 in)	317 cm (125 in)	Team Canada
15	Joel Regehr	31 May 1995	2.01 m (6 ft 7 in)	89 kg (196 lb)	342 cm (135 in)	328 cm (129 in)	Team Canada

== China ==
The following is the Chinese roster in the 2015 FIVB Volleyball Men's U21 World Championship.

Head coach: Genyin Ju

No.	Name	Date of birth	Height	Weight	Spike	Block	2015 club
1	Liu Libin	16 February 1995	1.98 m (6 ft 6 in)	90 kg (200 lb)	355 cm (140 in)	345 cm (136 in)	(China) Beijing BAIC Motors
2	Xu Zhensen	1 September 1996	1.87 m (6 ft 2 in)	83 kg (183 lb)	332 cm (131 in)	325 cm (128 in)	(China) Shanghai
3	Xia Runtao	18 October 1995	1.92 m (6 ft 4 in)	85 kg (187 lb)	320 cm (130 in)	310 cm (120 in)	(China) Hubei
4	Zhi Jiacheng	4 June 1995	1.78 m (5 ft 10 in)	65 kg (143 lb)	316 cm (124 in)	305 cm (120 in)	(China) Shanghai
7	Du Haixiang	25 May 1995	1.92 m (6 ft 4 in)	80 kg (180 lb)	340 cm (130 in)	330 cm (130 in)	(China) Sichuan
9	Lin Weiqi	9 October 1996	1.95 m (6 ft 5 in)	80 kg (180 lb)	345 cm (136 in)	345 cm (136 in)	(China) Shanghai
11	Yu Guanghui	6 March 1995	1.94 m (6 ft 4 in)	80 kg (180 lb)	338 cm (133 in)	328 cm (129 in)	(China) Fujian
12	Fu Houwen	5 May 1996	1.95 m (6 ft 5 in)	80 kg (180 lb)	345 cm (136 in)	345 cm (136 in)	(China) Shandong
15	Rao Shuhan	23 December 1996	2.05 m (6 ft 9 in)	100 kg (220 lb)	345 cm (136 in)	340 cm (130 in)	(China) Fujian
16	Li Yuanbo	27 September 1995	2.02 m (6 ft 8 in)	93 kg (205 lb)	345 cm (136 in)	335 cm (132 in)	(China) Henan
17	Yu Yaochen (C)	19 August 1995	1.95 m (6 ft 5 in)	80 kg (180 lb)	345 cm (136 in)	330 cm (130 in)	(China) Jiangsu
18	Zhang Zhejia	31 August 1995	2.07 m (6 ft 9 in)	90 kg (200 lb)	357 cm (141 in)	345 cm (136 in)	(China) Shanghai

== Cuba ==
The following is the Cuban roster in the 2015 FIVB Volleyball Men's U21 World Championship.

Head coach: Rodolfo Sanchez

No.	Name	Date of birth	Height	Weight	Spike	Block	2015 club
1	Osniel Melgarejo	18 December 1997	1.95 m (6 ft 5 in)	83 kg (183 lb)	345 cm (136 in)	320 cm (130 in)	(Cuba) Sancti Spiritus
2	Miguel Lopez	25 March 1997	1.89 m (6 ft 2 in)	75 kg (165 lb)	345 cm (136 in)	320 cm (130 in)	(Cuba) Cienfuegos
3	Ricardo Calvo	2 October 1996	1.93 m (6 ft 4 in)	74 kg (163 lb)	343 cm (135 in)	334 cm (131 in)	(Cuba) Villa Clara
5	Javier Concepcion	27 December 1997	2.00 m (6 ft 7 in)	84 kg (185 lb)	356 cm (140 in)	350 cm (140 in)	(Cuba) Havana
6	Luis Estrada	10 March 2000	1.99 m (6 ft 6 in)	90 kg (200 lb)	350 cm (140 in)	325 cm (128 in)	(Cuba) Havana
10	Miguel Gutierrez	21 February 1997	1.97 m (6 ft 6 in)	86 kg (190 lb)	340 cm (130 in)	355 cm (140 in)	(Cuba) Villa Clara
12	Abrahan Alfonso	23 February 1995	1.97 m (6 ft 6 in)	72 kg (159 lb)	343 cm (135 in)	320 cm (130 in)	(Cuba) Havana
14	Osmany Uriarte	4 June 1995	1.97 m (6 ft 6 in)	81 kg (179 lb)	352 cm (139 in)	348 cm (137 in)	(Cuba) Sancti Spiritus
15	Adrian Goide (C)	26 June 1998	1.91 m (6 ft 3 in)	80 kg (180 lb)	344 cm (135 in)	340 cm (130 in)	(Cuba) Sancti Spiritus
16	Luis Sosa	18 May 1995	1.96 m (6 ft 5 in)	76 kg (168 lb)	345 cm (136 in)	320 cm (130 in)	(Cuba) Havana
19	Lionnis Salazar	25 July 1997	1.85 m (6 ft 1 in)	77 kg (170 lb)	332 cm (131 in)	332 cm (131 in)	Santiago de Cuba

== Egypt ==
The following is the Egyptian roster in the 2015 FIVB Volleyball Men's U21 World Championship.

Head coach: Grzegorz Rys

No.	Name	Date of birth	Height	Weight	Spike	Block	2015 club
1	Ahmed Saleh	10 January 1995	2.00 m (6 ft 7 in)	85 kg (187 lb)	312 cm (123 in)	300 cm (120 in)	(Egypt) Al Ahly
2	Abdelrahman Abouelella	15 September 1996	2.09 m (6 ft 10 in)	117 kg (258 lb)	334 cm (131 in)	320 cm (130 in)	(Egypt) Tayaran
3	Ashraf Ellakany (C)	11 May 1995	1.92 m (6 ft 4 in)	75 kg (165 lb)	315 cm (124 in)	293 cm (115 in)	(Egypt) Zamalek
7	Hisham Ewais	26 February 1995	1.94 m (6 ft 4 in)	69 kg (152 lb)	333 cm (131 in)	305 cm (120 in)	(Egypt) Tayaran
9	Mahmoud Elshaikh	4 July 1996	1.93 m (6 ft 4 in)	79 kg (174 lb)	331 cm (130 in)	322 cm (127 in)	(Egypt) Al Shams
11	Mohamed Noureldin	1 July 1995	1.85 m (6 ft 1 in)	76 kg (168 lb)	305 cm (120 in)	290 cm (110 in)	(Egypt) Al Ahly
12	Mohamed Mahmoud	13 August 1995	1.90 m (6 ft 3 in)	77 kg (170 lb)	330 cm (130 in)	301 cm (119 in)	(Egypt) Petrojet
13	Abouelsoud Eid	3 April 1995	1.98 m (6 ft 6 in)	85 kg (187 lb)	308 cm (121 in)	295 cm (116 in)	(Egypt) Petrojet
14	Ahmed Omar	4 March 1995	1.96 m (6 ft 5 in)	93 kg (205 lb)	326 cm (128 in)	315 cm (124 in)	(Egypt) Sporting
15	Ahmed Elashry	19 July 1995	1.90 m (6 ft 3 in)	74 kg (163 lb)	314 cm (124 in)	295 cm (116 in)	(Egypt) Sporting
16	Mohamed Seliman	4 January 1995	2.08 m (6 ft 10 in)	90 kg (200 lb)	336 cm (132 in)	322 cm (127 in)	(Egypt) Zamalek
17	Saad Ahmed	13 January 1996	1.93 m (6 ft 4 in)	82 kg (181 lb)	315 cm (124 in)	293 cm (115 in)	(Egypt) Shorta

== France ==
The following is the French roster in the 2015 FIVB Volleyball Men's U21 World Championship.

Head coach: Jocelyn Trillon

No.	Name	Date of birth	Height	Weight	Spike	Block	2015 club
1	Jean Patry	27 December 1996	2.07 m (6 ft 9 in)	94 kg (207 lb)	337 cm (133 in)	314 cm (124 in)	(France) Montpellier
3	Nohoraii Paofai	12 November 1995	1.98 m (6 ft 6 in)	85 kg (187 lb)	336 cm (132 in)	315 cm (124 in)	(France) Tourcoing VB LM
5	Joachim Panou	27 August 1997	1.98 m (6 ft 6 in)	89 kg (196 lb)	345 cm (136 in)	318 cm (125 in)	(France) US Mulhousienne
6	Timothée Carle	30 November 1995	1.95 m (6 ft 5 in)	83 kg (183 lb)	336 cm (132 in)	314 cm (124 in)	(France) AS Cannes
7	Fran Novotni	22 February 1997	1.97 m (6 ft 6 in)	84 kg (185 lb)	345 cm (136 in)	324 cm (128 in)	(France) Nice VB
8	Stephen Boyer	10 April 1996	1.96 m (6 ft 5 in)	77 kg (170 lb)	335 cm (132 in)	314 cm (124 in)	(France) Ajaccio
9	Julien Gatineau	6 December 1995	1.80 m (5 ft 11 in)	75 kg (165 lb)	315 cm (124 in)	295 cm (116 in)	(France) ASUL Lyon Volley-Ball
10	Luka Bašič (C)	29 January 1995	2.01 m (6 ft 7 in)	77 kg (170 lb)	330 cm (130 in)	302 cm (119 in)	(France) AS Cannes
14	Hugo Lecat	12 July 1995	1.85 m (6 ft 1 in)	80 kg (180 lb)	315 cm (124 in)	303 cm (119 in)	(France) Tourcoing VB LM
15	Thomas Nevot	30 April 1995	1.92 m (6 ft 4 in)	84 kg (185 lb)	317 cm (125 in)	300 cm (120 in)	(France) Narbonne
16	Médéric Henry	20 June 1995	2.12 m (6 ft 11 in)	106 kg (234 lb)	345 cm (136 in)	327 cm (129 in)	(France) Arago de Sète
17	Barthélémy Chinenyeze	28 February 1998	2.00 m (6 ft 7 in)	80 kg (180 lb)	345 cm (136 in)	320 cm (130 in)	(France) Dunkerque GL VB

== Iran ==
The following is the Iranian roster in the 2015 FIVB Volleyball Men's U21 World Championship.

Head coach: Farhad Nafarzadeh

No.	Name	Date of birth	Height	Weight	Spike	Block	2015 club
3	Javad Karimi	1 March 1998	2.02 m (6 ft 8 in)	100 kg (220 lb)	340 cm (130 in)	310 cm (120 in)	(Iran) Erteashat Sanati
4	Hamid Hamoodi	26 June 1995	1.95 m (6 ft 5 in)	83 kg (183 lb)	317 cm (125 in)	305 cm (120 in)	(Iran) Bank Keshavarzi
5	Akbar Valaei (C)	2 September 1997	1.87 m (6 ft 2 in)	81 kg (179 lb)	340 cm (130 in)	315 cm (124 in)	(Iran) Shahrdari Tabriz
6	Rahman Taghi	26 July 1995	2.05 m (6 ft 9 in)	98 kg (216 lb)	348 cm (137 in)	328 cm (129 in)	(Iran) Kaleh Amol
8	Salim Cheperli	19 December 1996	2.01 m (6 ft 7 in)	80 kg (180 lb)	340 cm (130 in)	330 cm (130 in)	(Iran) Vezarat Defa
9	Sahand Allah	8 December 1995	1.99 m (6 ft 6 in)	88 kg (194 lb)	338 cm (133 in)	312 cm (123 in)	(Iran) Bank Keshavarzi
10	Amin Esmaeilnejad	17 December 1996	2.03 m (6 ft 8 in)	90 kg (200 lb)	343 cm (135 in)	332 cm (131 in)	(Iran) Vezarat Defa
11	Mohammad Amin Heidary	3 October 1995	1.88 m (6 ft 2 in)	78 kg (172 lb)	310 cm (120 in)	303 cm (119 in)	(Iran) Safir
12	Mohammad Reza Evazpour	29 April 1995	2.06 m (6 ft 9 in)	89 kg (196 lb)	348 cm (137 in)	328 cm (129 in)	(Iran) Bank Keshavarzi
13	Mohammad Ali Piran	5 June 1995	2.00 m (6 ft 7 in)	90 kg (200 lb)	330 cm (130 in)	325 cm (128 in)	(Iran) Aluminium
15	Saeed Javaheri	6 June 1995	1.92 m (6 ft 4 in)	78 kg (172 lb)	365 cm (144 in)	355 cm (140 in)	(Iran) Saipa
16	Mohammad Daliri	1 February 1995	1.87 m (6 ft 2 in)	77 kg (170 lb)	320 cm (130 in)	306 cm (120 in)	(Iran) Saipa

== Italy ==
The following is the Italian roster in the 2015 FIVB Volleyball Men's U21 World Championship.

Head coach: Michele Totire

No.	Name	Date of birth	Height	Weight	Spike	Block	2015 club
1	Alberto Polo	7 September 1995	1.99 m (6 ft 6 in)	76 kg (168 lb)	348 cm (137 in)	318 cm (125 in)	(Italy) Potenza Picena
2	Marco Vitelli	4 April 1996	2.03 m (6 ft 8 in)	94 kg (207 lb)	0 cm (0 in)	0 cm (0 in)	(Italy) Lube Volley Treia
3	Francesco Zoppellari	27 May 1997	1.85 m (6 ft 1 in)	79 kg (174 lb)	316 cm (124 in)	300 cm (120 in)	(Italy) Club Italia
5	Oreste Cavuto	5 December 1996	1.96 m (6 ft 5 in)	87 kg (192 lb)	353 cm (139 in)	344 cm (135 in)	(Italy) Trentino Volley
6	Giacomo Raffaelli	7 February 1995	1.98 m (6 ft 6 in)	95 kg (209 lb)	338 cm (133 in)	330 cm (130 in)	(Italy) Emma Villas
7	Fabio Balaso	20 October 1995	1.78 m (5 ft 10 in)	73 kg (161 lb)	305 cm (120 in)	280 cm (110 in)	(Italy) Sempre Volley
10	Tiziano Mazzone (C)	22 July 1995	1.98 m (6 ft 6 in)	95 kg (209 lb)	350 cm (140 in)	315 cm (124 in)	(Italy) Trentino Volley
12	Gianluca Galassi	24 July 1997	2.01 m (6 ft 7 in)	94 kg (207 lb)	350 cm (140 in)	325 cm (128 in)	(Italy) Trentino Volley
14	Sebastiano Milan	6 April 1995	2.04 m (6 ft 8 in)	85 kg (187 lb)	355 cm (140 in)	258 cm (102 in)	(Italy) Sempre Volley
15	Andrea Argenta	1 June 1996	2.05 m (6 ft 9 in)	95 kg (209 lb)	0 cm (0 in)	0 cm (0 in)	(Italy) Club Italia
16	Riccardo Sbertoli	23 May 1998	1.88 m (6 ft 2 in)	85 kg (187 lb)	326 cm (128 in)	246 cm (97 in)	(Italy) Volley Segrate
17	Marco Pierotti	19 June 1996	1.95 m (6 ft 5 in)	86 kg (190 lb)	357 cm (141 in)	350 cm (140 in)	(Italy) Virtus V. Fano

== Japan ==
The following is the Japanese roster in the 2015 FIVB Volleyball Men's U21 World Championship.

Head coach: Shingo Sakai

No.	Name	Date of birth	Height	Weight	Spike	Block	2015 club
1	Tsubasa Hisahara (C)	18 March 1995	1.87 m (6 ft 2 in)	72 kg (159 lb)	332 cm (131 in)	323 cm (127 in)	(Japan) Tokai University
2	Hiroki Goto	20 January 1995	1.84 m (6 ft 0 in)	69 kg (152 lb)	325 cm (128 in)	310 cm (120 in)	(Japan) Juntendo University
3	Yuhi Kamiya	20 November 1995	1.91 m (6 ft 3 in)	75 kg (165 lb)	338 cm (133 in)	325 cm (128 in)	(Japan) Tokai University
4	Ataru Kumakura	17 December 1995	1.87 m (6 ft 2 in)	70 kg (150 lb)	345 cm (136 in)	320 cm (130 in)	(Japan) Juntendo University
5	Takaya Yamazaki	11 April 1995	1.94 m (6 ft 4 in)	84 kg (185 lb)	330 cm (130 in)	331 cm (130 in)	(Japan) Waseda University
6	Kenta Takanashi	25 March 1997	1.90 m (6 ft 3 in)	77 kg (170 lb)	333 cm (131 in)	312 cm (123 in)	(Japan) Nippon Sport Science Univ.
7	Yuto Fujinaka	20 April 1996	1.83 m (6 ft 0 in)	71 kg (157 lb)	330 cm (130 in)	320 cm (130 in)	(Japan) Waseda University
8	Taishi Onodera	27 February 1996	1.98 m (6 ft 6 in)	88 kg (194 lb)	330 cm (130 in)	320 cm (130 in)	(Japan) Tokai University
9	Issei Otake	3 December 1995	2.00 m (6 ft 7 in)	91 kg (201 lb)	330 cm (130 in)	320 cm (130 in)	(Japan) Chuo University
10	Yuki Higuchi	27 April 1996	1.91 m (6 ft 3 in)	74 kg (163 lb)	337 cm (133 in)	315 cm (124 in)	(Japan) University of Tsukuba
11	Keisuke Sakai	25 August 1996	1.86 m (6 ft 1 in)	70 kg (150 lb)	325 cm (128 in)	305 cm (120 in)	(Japan) University of Tsukuba
12	Motoki Eiro	8 June 1996	1.89 m (6 ft 2 in)	70 kg (150 lb)	329 cm (130 in)	320 cm (130 in)	(Japan) Tokai University

== Mexico ==
The following is the Mexican roster in the 2015 FIVB Volleyball Men's U21 World Championship.

Head coach: Eduardo Murguia

No.	Name	Date of birth	Height	Weight	Spike	Block	2015 club
2	Enrique Noriega	3 March 1996	1.96 m (6 ft 5 in)	83 kg (183 lb)	318 cm (125 in)	320 cm (130 in)	(Mexico) Sinaloa
3	Sebastian Castro	18 October 1996	1.90 m (6 ft 3 in)	82 kg (181 lb)	316 cm (124 in)	288 cm (113 in)	(Mexico) Baja California
5	Jaime Estrella	19 May 1995	1.90 m (6 ft 3 in)	70 kg (150 lb)	310 cm (120 in)	290 cm (110 in)	(Mexico) Chihuahua
6	Ridel Garay	9 June 1997	1.94 m (6 ft 4 in)	74 kg (163 lb)	326 cm (128 in)	299 cm (118 in)	(Mexico) Jalisco
7	Yostin Frias	10 July 1995	1.92 m (6 ft 4 in)	73 kg (161 lb)	313 cm (123 in)	305 cm (120 in)	(Mexico) Nuevo Leon
8	Joshua Martinez	18 April 1995	1.96 m (6 ft 5 in)	69 kg (152 lb)	318 cm (125 in)	295 cm (116 in)	(Mexico) Chihuahua
9	Francisco Olvera	24 September 1995	0 m (0 in)	0 kg (0 lb)	0 cm (0 in)	0 cm (0 in)	
10	Enrique Ugalde (C)	11 April 1996	1.90 m (6 ft 3 in)	76 kg (168 lb)	318 cm (125 in)	295 cm (116 in)	(Mexico) Chihuahua
11	Bruno Cruz	29 March 1997	1.88 m (6 ft 2 in)	70 kg (150 lb)	332 cm (131 in)	290 cm (110 in)	(Mexico) Baja California
13	Gabriel Martinez	21 January 1995	1.87 m (6 ft 2 in)	79 kg (174 lb)	318 cm (125 in)	289 cm (114 in)	(Mexico) Chihuahua
15	Christian Aranda	9 April 1997	1.90 m (6 ft 3 in)	65 kg (143 lb)	322 cm (127 in)	288 cm (113 in)	(Mexico) Baja California
17	Luis Bojorquez	14 December 1995	1.99 m (6 ft 6 in)	80 kg (180 lb)	337 cm (133 in)	298 cm (117 in)	(Mexico) Sinaloa

== Poland ==
The following is the Polish roster in the 2015 FIVB Volleyball Men's U21 World Championship.

Head coach: Jakub Bednaruk

No.	Name	Date of birth	Height	Weight	Spike	Block	2015 club
3	Jakub Popiwczak	14 April 1996	1.80 m (5 ft 11 in)	77 kg (170 lb)	315 cm (124 in)	300 cm (120 in)	(Poland) Jastrzębski Węgiel
4	Marcin Komenda	24 May 1996	1.98 m (6 ft 6 in)	90 kg (200 lb)	335 cm (132 in)	315 cm (124 in)	(Poland) AKS Resovia Rzeszów
5	Paweł Halaba	14 December 1995	1.94 m (6 ft 4 in)	87 kg (192 lb)	354 cm (139 in)	330 cm (130 in)	(Poland) AZS AGH Kraków
6	Dominik Depowski	27 October 1995	2.00 m (6 ft 7 in)	93 kg (205 lb)	345 cm (136 in)	320 cm (130 in)	(Poland) AKS Resovia Rzeszów
9	Krzysztof Bieńkowski	19 June 1995	1.97 m (6 ft 6 in)	84 kg (185 lb)	338 cm (133 in)	311 cm (122 in)	(Poland) EKS Skra Bełchatów
10	Bartłomiej Lemański	19 March 1996	2.08 m (6 ft 10 in)	88 kg (194 lb)	345 cm (136 in)	323 cm (127 in)	(Poland) KS Metro Warszawa
11	Aleksander Śliwka (C)	24 May 1995	1.94 m (6 ft 4 in)	78 kg (172 lb)	337 cm (133 in)	321 cm (126 in)	(Poland) AZS Politechnika Warszawska
13	Rafał Szymura	29 August 1995	1.96 m (6 ft 5 in)	88 kg (194 lb)	335 cm (132 in)	309 cm (122 in)	(Poland) TS Volley Rybnik
14	Marcin Kania	14 February 1996	2.02 m (6 ft 8 in)	86 kg (190 lb)	346 cm (136 in)	320 cm (130 in)	(Poland) Asseco Resovia Rzeszów
17	Paweł Gryc	9 January 1996	2.07 m (6 ft 9 in)	100 kg (220 lb)	348 cm (137 in)	320 cm (130 in)	(Poland) ZAKSA Kędzierzyn-Koźle
18	Bartłomiej Mordyl	21 January 1995	2.00 m (6 ft 7 in)	85 kg (187 lb)	355 cm (140 in)	320 cm (130 in)	(Poland) AZS Politechnika Warszawska
19	Bartłomiej Lipiński	16 November 1996	2.01 m (6 ft 7 in)	95 kg (209 lb)	350 cm (140 in)	330 cm (130 in)	(Poland) KS Metro Warszawa

== Russia ==
The following is the Russian roster in the 2015 FIVB Volleyball Men's U21 World Championship.

Head coach: Mikhail Nikolaev

No.	Name	Date of birth	Height	Weight	Spike	Block	2015 club
1	Pavel Pankov (C)	14 August 1995	1.98 m (6 ft 6 in)	90 kg (200 lb)	345 cm (136 in)	330 cm (130 in)	(Russia) Dynamo Moscow
4	Kirill Ursov	13 February 1995	1.94 m (6 ft 4 in)	86 kg (190 lb)	335 cm (132 in)	325 cm (128 in)	(Russia) Tyumen
5	Sergei Pirainen	27 February 1996	2.03 m (6 ft 8 in)	91 kg (201 lb)	350 cm (140 in)	340 cm (130 in)	(Russia) Avtomobilist Saint Petersburg
6	Evgenii Andreev	6 January 1995	1.80 m (5 ft 11 in)	72 kg (159 lb)	305 cm (120 in)	295 cm (116 in)	(Russia) Gazprom-Yugra
8	Aleksandr Melnikov	3 May 1997	2.00 m (6 ft 7 in)	90 kg (200 lb)	350 cm (140 in)	340 cm (130 in)	(Russia) Dinamo Krasnodar
10	Maxim Belogortcev	3 February 1996	2.03 m (6 ft 8 in)	92 kg (203 lb)	340 cm (130 in)	330 cm (130 in)	(Russia) Lokomotiv Novosibirsk
11	Alexander Goncharov	25 February 1995	2.00 m (6 ft 7 in)	89 kg (196 lb)	340 cm (130 in)	330 cm (130 in)	(Russia) Grozny
13	Roman Zhos	4 January 1995	1.97 m (6 ft 6 in)	86 kg (190 lb)	330 cm (130 in)	320 cm (130 in)	(Russia) Gazprom-Stavropol
14	Aleksandr Kimerov	11 September 1996	2.15 m (7 ft 1 in)	103 kg (227 lb)	355 cm (140 in)	335 cm (132 in)	(Russia) Dinamo Krasnodar
15	Dmitry Volkov	25 May 1995	2.01 m (6 ft 7 in)	88 kg (194 lb)	340 cm (130 in)	330 cm (130 in)	(Russia) Fakel
17	Mikhail Morov	19 April 1996	2.05 m (6 ft 9 in)	90 kg (200 lb)	335 cm (132 in)	325 cm (128 in)	(Russia) Yaroslavich Yaroslavl
18	Denis Bogdan	13 October 1996	2.00 m (6 ft 7 in)	92 kg (203 lb)	350 cm (140 in)	340 cm (130 in)	(Russia) Fakel

== Slovenia ==
The following is the Slovenian roster in the 2015 FIVB Volleyball Men's U21 World Championship.

Head coach: Iztok Kšela

No.	Name	Date of birth	Height	Weight	Spike	Block	2015 club
2	Matevž Ledinek	14 April 1995	1.80 m (5 ft 11 in)	70 kg (150 lb)	316 cm (124 in)	299 cm (118 in)	(Slovenia) Oklahoma Home
4	Urban Drvarič	15 November 1995	1.86 m (6 ft 1 in)	81 kg (179 lb)	317 cm (125 in)	303 cm (119 in)	(Slovenia) Panvita Pomgrad
5	Tonček Stern	14 November 1995	2.00 m (6 ft 7 in)	93 kg (205 lb)	346 cm (136 in)	312 cm (123 in)	(Slovenia) Calcit Volleyball
6	Jure Okroglic	27 January 1997	1.90 m (6 ft 3 in)	80 kg (180 lb)	333 cm (131 in)	305 cm (120 in)	(Slovenia) OK Salonit Anhovo
7	Sergej Drobnič	25 February 1995	1.90 m (6 ft 3 in)	79 kg (174 lb)	335 cm (132 in)	308 cm (121 in)	(Slovenia) Calcit Volleyball
8	Primož Vidmar	13 February 1995	1.93 m (6 ft 4 in)	88 kg (194 lb)	343 cm (135 in)	312 cm (123 in)	(Slovenia) Calcit Volleyball
9	Matej Kök	11 December 1996	1.98 m (6 ft 6 in)	85 kg (187 lb)	345 cm (136 in)	314 cm (124 in)	(Slovenia) Astec Triglav
10	Jernej Vrhunc (C)	30 January 1996	1.88 m (6 ft 2 in)	80 kg (180 lb)	325 cm (128 in)	305 cm (120 in)	(Slovenia) OK Šoštanj Topolšica
11	Žiga Donik	21 September 1995	1.91 m (6 ft 3 in)	80 kg (180 lb)	336 cm (132 in)	312 cm (123 in)	(Slovenia) OK Maibor
13	Jakob Rojnik	9 January 1996	1.91 m (6 ft 3 in)	79 kg (174 lb)	330 cm (130 in)	310 cm (120 in)	(Slovenia) OK Šoštanj Topolšica
16	Sašo Štalekar	3 May 1996	2.10 m (6 ft 11 in)	90 kg (200 lb)	345 cm (136 in)	314 cm (124 in)	(Slovenia) OK Mislinja
18	Jan Kozamernik	24 December 1995	2.03 m (6 ft 8 in)	93 kg (205 lb)	345 cm (136 in)	313 cm (123 in)	(Slovenia) ACH Volley

== Turkey ==
The following is the Turkish roster in the 2015 FIVB Volleyball Men's U21 World Championship.

Head coach: Barış Özdemir

No.	Name	Date of birth	Height	Weight	Spike	Block	2015 club
2	Onurcan Çakır	27 September 1995	1.87 m (6 ft 2 in)	80 kg (180 lb)	315 cm (124 in)	295 cm (116 in)	(Turkey) Galatasaray
3	Melih Sıratça	18 February 1996	1.92 m (6 ft 4 in)	79 kg (174 lb)	335 cm (132 in)	318 cm (125 in)	(Turkey) Galatasaray
5	Osman Durmaz	9 September 1996	1.98 m (6 ft 6 in)	88 kg (194 lb)	349 cm (137 in)	325 cm (128 in)	(Turkey) Arkas
7	Vahit Savaş (C)	7 March 1995	2.00 m (6 ft 7 in)	87 kg (192 lb)	332 cm (131 in)	318 cm (125 in)	(Turkey) Ziraat Bankası
8	Mert Güneş	26 August 1995	1.94 m (6 ft 4 in)	82 kg (181 lb)	320 cm (130 in)	305 cm (120 in)	(Turkey) Tvf Spor Lisesi Vol. Ihtisas
10	Cansın Enaboifo	7 September 1995	1.93 m (6 ft 4 in)	91 kg (201 lb)	336 cm (132 in)	320 cm (130 in)	(Turkey) Ziraat Bankası
12	Selim Demir	2 April 1996	1.85 m (6 ft 1 in)	79 kg (174 lb)	312 cm (123 in)	300 cm (120 in)	(Turkey) Ziraat Bankası
13	Yasin Aydın	11 July 1995	1.90 m (6 ft 3 in)	72 kg (159 lb)	342 cm (135 in)	324 cm (128 in)	(Turkey) Galatasaray
14	Mehmet Hacıoğlu	29 March 1995	1.89 m (6 ft 2 in)	78 kg (172 lb)	320 cm (130 in)	305 cm (120 in)	(Turkey) Tofaş
17	Muhammet Kaya	17 February 1995	1.95 m (6 ft 5 in)	73 kg (161 lb)	342 cm (135 in)	324 cm (128 in)	(Turkey) Arkas
18	Bertuğ Öndeş	30 October 1995	1.97 m (6 ft 6 in)	73 kg (161 lb)	322 cm (127 in)	309 cm (122 in)	(Turkey) Fenerbahçe
20	Çam Abdullah	30 March 1997	1.95 m (6 ft 5 in)	80 kg (180 lb)	316 cm (124 in)	300 cm (120 in)	(Turkey) Halkbank

== United States ==
The following is the American roster in the 2015 FIVB Volleyball Men's U21 World Championship.

Head coach: Daniel Friend

No.	Name	Date of birth	Height	Weight	Spike	Block	2015 club
1	Andrew Benesh	14 March 1995	2.03 m (6 ft 8 in)	89 kg (196 lb)	345 cm (136 in)	328 cm (129 in)	(United States) University of Southern California
2	Hayden Boehle	15 April 1996	1.86 m (6 ft 1 in)	79 kg (174 lb)	323 cm (127 in)	307 cm (121 in)	(United States) University of California St. Barbara
3	Soren Peter Kindem	4 January 1995	1.90 m (6 ft 3 in)	82 kg (181 lb)	348 cm (137 in)	323 cm (127 in)	(United States) Pepperdine University
4	Kupono Fey	21 January 1995	1.96 m (6 ft 5 in)	92 kg (203 lb)	344 cm (135 in)	324 cm (128 in)	(United States) University of Hawaii
5	Jennings Franciskovic	10 May 1995	1.96 m (6 ft 5 in)	81 kg (179 lb)	355 cm (140 in)	343 cm (135 in)	(United States) University of Hawaii
6	Richard Gevis	2 August 1996	2.11 m (6 ft 11 in)	109 kg (240 lb)	366 cm (144 in)	343 cm (135 in)	(United States) Loyola University Chicago
7	John Hatch (C)	12 February 1996	1.88 m (6 ft 2 in)	83 kg (183 lb)	320 cm (130 in)	291 cm (115 in)	(United States) University of California
8	Jeffrey Jendryk	15 September 1995	2.08 m (6 ft 10 in)	89 kg (196 lb)	353 cm (139 in)	345 cm (136 in)	(United States) Loyola University Chicago
9	Christopher Nugent	17 May 1995	1.96 m (6 ft 5 in)	84 kg (185 lb)	348 cm (137 in)	320 cm (130 in)	(United States) Pennsylvania State University
10	George Perinar	12 December 1995	2.01 m (6 ft 7 in)	86 kg (190 lb)	340 cm (130 in)	318 cm (125 in)	(United States) Lewis University
12	Matthew Walsh	23 July 1996	2.11 m (6 ft 11 in)	100 kg (220 lb)	357 cm (141 in)	338 cm (133 in)	(United States) Ball State University
13	Colby Harriman	8 November 1995	1.94 m (6 ft 4 in)	89 kg (196 lb)	332 cm (131 in)	312 cm (123 in)	(United States) Pepperdine University

== See also ==
- 2015 FIVB Volleyball Women's U20 World Championship squads
