= 2014–15 Men's Volleyball Serie A1 =

- League: Italian Volleyball League
- Sport: Men's volleyball
- Duration: October 17, 2014 – May 17, 2015
- Number of teams: 13
- League champions: Energy T.I. Diatec Trentino (4th title)
- Runners-up: Parmareggio Modena
- Season MVP: Simone Giannelli

Italian Volleyball League seasons
- ← 2013–14 2015–16 →

2014–15 Serie A1 is the 70th season of the Italian Championship (Italian Volleyball League) organized under the supervision of Federazione Italiana Pallavolo.

== Regular season ==
Pos	Team	Pld	W	L	Pts	SW	SL	SR	SPW	SPL	SPR	Qualification
1	Energy T.I. Diatec Trentino	24	21	3	62	67	18	3.722	2019	1724	1.171	Play–offs
2	Parmareggio Modena	24	20	4	60	64	19	3.368	1995	1725	1.157	Play–offs
3	Cucine Lube Banca Marche Treia	24	19	5	57	63	26	2.423	2124	1913	1.110	Play–offs
4	Sir Safety Perugia	24	17	7	50	59	33	1.788	2154	2015	1.069	Play–offs
5	Calzedonia Verona	24	16	8	47	53	35	1.514	2037	1961	1.039	Play–offs
6	Top Volley Latina	23	12	11	38	52	43	1.209	2168	2057	1.054	Play–offs
7	CMC Ravenna	24	11	13	35	43	46	0.935	1974	2016	0.979	Play–offs
8	Exprivia Neldiritto Molfetta	24	12	12	32	44	51	0.863	2047	2161	0.947	Play–offs
9	Copra Piacenza	24	8	16	25	35	54	0.648	1967	2033	0.968	
10	Vero Volley Monza	23	7	16	23	33	56	0.589	1943	2085	0.932	
11	Tonazzo Padova	24	5	19	15	26	63	0.413	1945	2118	0.918	
12	Revivre Milano	24	4	20	11	20	67	0.299	1845	2103	0.877	
13	Altotevere Cittŕ di Castello	24	3	21	10	20	68	0.294	1783	2100	0.849	

== Play–offs ==
Quarterfinals
1	Energy T.I. Diatec Trentino	2
8	Exprivia Neldiritto Molfetta	0
4	Sir Safety Perugia	2
5	Calzedonia Verona	1
2	Parmareggio Modena	2
7	CMC Ravenna	1
3	Cucine Lube Banca Treia	1
6	Top Volley Latina	2

Semifinals
1	Energy T.I. Diatec Trentino	2
4	Sir Safety Perugia	1
2	Parmareggio Modena	2
6	Top Volley Latina	0

Finals
1	Energy T.I. Diatec Trentino	3
2	Parmareggio Modena	1

== Final standing ==
Rank	Team
1st place, gold medalist(s)	Energy T.I. Diatec Trentino
2nd place, silver medalist(s)	Parmareggio Modena
3rd place, bronze medalist(s)	Cucine Lube Banca Marche Treia
4	Sir Safety Perugia
5	Calzedonia Verona
6	Top Volley Latina
7	CMC Ravenna
8	Exprivia Neldiritto Molfetta
9	Copra Piacenza
10	Revivre Milano
11	Tonazzo Padova
12	Vero Volley Monza
13	Altotevere Cittŕ di Castello

2015 Italian Champions
Energy T.I. Diatec Trentino
4th title

Matey Kaziyski, Gabriele Nelli, Emanuele Birarelli, Łukasz Żygadło, Martin Nemec, Sebastiano Thei, Simone Giannelli, Filippo Lanza, Sebastián Solé, Tiziano Mazzone, Massimo Colaci, Mitar Tzourits, Michele Fedrizzi, Matteo Burgsthaler
Head coach
Radostin Stoychev
