= Luis Estrada =

Luis Estrada may refer to:

- Luis Estrada (footballer) (born 1948), Mexican footballer
- Luis Estrada (director) (born 1962), Mexican film director
- Luis Estrada (volleyball) (born 2000), Cuban volleyball player
