= Yuga Tarumi =

Japanese volleyball player (born 2000)

Personal information
- Nationality: Japan
- Born: 2 November 2000 (age 25) Kusatsu, Japan
- Height: 1.87 m (6 ft 2 in)

Volleyball information
- Position: Outside hitter
- Current club: Cisterna Volley
- Number: 9

Career
- Years: Team
- 2016–2019 2019–2023 2023–2024 2024–present: (Japan) Rakunan (Japan) Tsukuba Daigaku (Japan) Osaka Bluteon (Italy) Cisterna Volley

National team
- Years: Team
- 2023–: Japan

Yuga Tarumi (垂水優芽, Tarumi Yūga, born 2 November 2000) is a Japanese professional volleyball player and member of the Japan men's national volleyball team.

== Career ==
=== Clubs ===
Yuga Tarumi's career began in 2016 at the school level with Rakunan, before continuing at the university level in 2019 with Tsukuba Daigaku. After graduating, he was signed by the Osaka Bluteon in V.League, making his debut in the championship playoffs during the 2022–23 season and winning the 2023 Emperor's Cup.

In the 2024–25 season, he moved to Italy to play for Cisterna in the Italian Superlega. In February 2025, he receives his first MVP award in the Italian's top league after the match between Cisterna and Modena.

=== National team ===
In 2023, he received his first call-ups to the Japanese national team.
