= Efe Bayram =

Turkish volleyball player (born 2002)

Personal information
- Born: 1 March 2002 (age 24); Ankara, Turkey
- Height: 1.94 m (6 ft 4 in)
- Weight: 88 kg (194 lb)
- Spike: 347 cm (137 in)
- Block: 326 cm (128 in)

Volleyball information
- Position: Outside hitter
- Current club: Cisterna Volley
- Number: 20

Career
Years	Teams
2018–2022; 2022–2023; 2023-present	Halkbank Ankara; Top Volley Cisterna; Cisterna Volley

National team
Turkey
Honours
Men's volleyball
Representing Turkey
FIVB Challenger Cup
Gold medal – first place	2023 Doha
European League
Gold medal – first place	2023 Croatia
Silver medal – second place	2022 Croatia

Efe Bayram (born 1 March 2002) is a Turkish professional volleyball player who plays as an outside hitter for Cisterna Volley and the Turkey national team.

== Honours ==
=== Club ===
- CEV Challenge Cup
  - 2021–22 – with Halkbank Ankara
- Domestic
  - 2018–19 Turkish SuperCup, with Halkbank Ankara
  - 2021–22 Turkish Championship, with Halkbank Ankara
