= Franco Anderlini =

Italian volleyball coach (1921–1984)

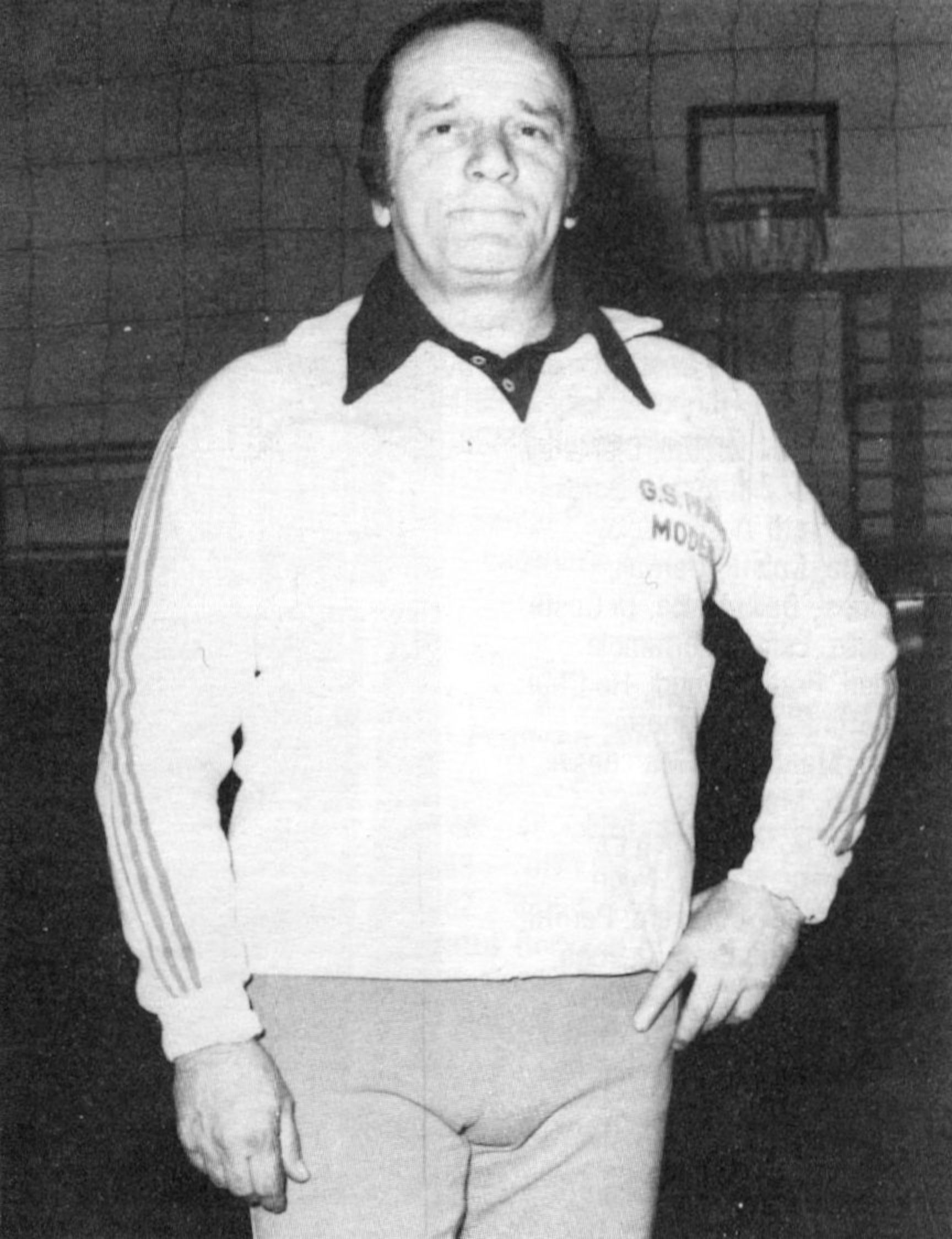
- Anderlini as Panini Modena coach between late 1960s and early 1970s

Personal information
- Nickname: Il Prof (The Professor)
- Nationality: Italian
- Born: August 17, 1921; Modena, Italy
- Died: January 18, 1984 (aged 62); Prato, Italy

Coaching information
Previous teams coached
| Years | Teams |
|---|---|
| 1947–52; 1953–64; 1964–66; 1966–75; 1968–83; 1975–76; 1975–77 | U.S. Ferrari Modena; Avia Pervia Modena; G.S. Menegola Modena; Panini Modena; Italy juniores; Pallavolo Cesenatico; Italy |
- Last updated: March 16, 2015

Franco Anderlini (17 August 1921 – 18 January 1984) was an Italian volleyball coach. He is one of the most successful ones having won eight Italian league titles.

== Career ==
In 1947 Anderlini founded the Unione Sportiva Ferrari volleyball team, reaching Serie A in 1951. The following year the club was merged with the Avia Pervia Modena and Anderlini was confirmed as head coach. Between 1957 and 1963 he led the team to five Italian league titles. The Avia Pervia was disbanded after the 1964 season, so Anderlini switched to the G.S. Menegola and then to the newborn Panini Modena team. It took only two season to achieve Serie A and afterwards Anderlini lead Panini to three Italian league titles.

Between 1968 and 1983 he was head coach of Italy men's national juniores team; in 1975 he was also named coach of Italy men's national team.

Anderlini died in 1984 in a car accident.
