= 2015–16 Men's Volleyball Serie A1 =

- League: Italian Volleyball League
- Sport: Men's volleyball
- Duration: October 25, 2015 – 2016
- Teams: 12
- Top scorer: Aleksandar Atanasijević

Finals
- Champions: DHL Modena (12)
- Runners-up: Sir Safety Perugia
- Finals MVP: Earvin N'Gapeth

Italian Volleyball League seasons
- 2014–15 2016–17

2015–16 Serie A1 is the 71st season of the Italian Championship (Italian Volleyball League) organized under the supervision of Federazione Italiana Pallavolo.

== Regular season ==
Pos	Team	Pld	W	L	Pts	SW	SL	SR	SPW	SPL	SPR	Qualification
1	Cucine Lube Civitanova	22	20	2	59	64	19	3.368	1979	1713	1.155	Play–offs
2	DHL Modena	22	18	4	52	60	26	2.308	2003	1822	1.099	Play–offs
3	Trentino Diatec	22	17	5	47	55	30	1.833	1968	1770	1.112	Play–offs
4	Calzedonia Verona	22	14	8	44	52	34	1.529	1956	1911	1.024	Play–offs
5	Sir Safety Conad Perugia	22	14	8	42	50	33	1.515	1912	1791	1.068	Play–offs
6	Exprivia Molfetta	22	10	12	29	41	44	0.932	1881	1899	0.991	Play–offs
7	Tonazzo Padova	22	9	13	28	37	47	0.787	1869	1931	0.968	Play–offs
8	Ninfa Latina	22	9	13	27	38	49	0.776	1897	1943	0.976	Play–offs
9	Gi Group Monza	22	7	15	22	33	52	0.635	2001	2116	0.946	
10	CMC Romagna	22	7	15	22	36	56	0.643	1907	2022	0.943	
11	Revivre Milano	22	5	17	16	24	58	0.414	1723	1937	0.890	
12	LPR Piacenza	22	2	20	8	20	62	0.323	1678	1919	0.874	

== Play–offs ==
Quarterfinals
1	Cucine Lube Civitanova	3
8	Ninfa Latina	0
4	Calzedonia Verona	2
5	Sir Safety Conad Perugia	3
2	DHL Modena	3
7	Tonazzo Padova	1
3	Trentino Diatec	3
6	Exprivia Molfetta	2

Semifinals
1	Cucine Lube Civitanova	1
5	Sir Safety Conad Perugia	3
2	DHL Modena	3
3	Trentino Diatec	1

Finals
5	Sir Safety Conad Perugia	0
2	DHL Modena	3

=== Quarterfinals ===
(Best-of-five playoff)

Date	Time		Score		Set 1	Set 2	Set 3	Set 4	Set 5	Total	Report
10 Mar	20:30	'Cucine Lube Civitanova'	3–2	Ninfa Latina	23–25	25–14	24–26	25–22	15–13	112–100	Report
13 Mar	18:00	Ninfa Latina	0–3	'Cucine Lube Civitanova'	21–25	17–25	15–25			53–75	Report
20 Mar	18:00	'Cucine Lube Civitanova'	3–0	Ninfa Latina	25–21	25–17	25–14			75–52	Report

Date	Time		Score		Set 1	Set 2	Set 3	Set 4	Set 5	Total	Report
10 Mar	20:30	Calzedonia Verona	2–3	'Sir Safety Conad Perugia'	26–24	25–20	17–25	21–25	10–15	99–109	Report
13 Mar	18:00	'Sir Safety Conad Perugia'	3–0	Calzedonia Verona	25–17	25–23	25–20			75–60	Report
23 Mar	20:30	'Calzedonia Verona'	3–2	Sir Safety Conad Perugia	23–25	25–22	25–20	20–25	15–11	108–103	Report
27 Mar	18:00	Sir Safety Conad Perugia	2–3	'Calzedonia Verona'	25–17	25–27	24–26	25–18	12–15	111–103	Report
6 Apr	20:30	Calzedonia Verona	2–3	'Sir Safety Conad Perugia'	20–25	24–26	25–18	25–23	15–17	109–109	Report

Date	Time		Score		Set 1	Set 2	Set 3	Set 4	Set 5	Total	Report
10 Mar	20:30	'DHL Modena'	3–0	Tonazzo Padova	25–20	34–32	25–20			84–72	Report
13 Mar	18:00	'Tonazzo Padova'	3–1	DHL Modena	19–25	25–22	25–21	26–24		95–92	Report
20 Mar	18:00	'DHL Modena'	3–1	Tonazzo Padova	25–18	22–25	25–15	25–20		97–78	Report
27 Mar	17:00	Tonazzo Padova	2–3	'DHL Modena'	25–21	23–25	25–20	23–25	12–15	108–106	Report

Date	Time		Score		Set 1	Set 2	Set 3	Set 4	Set 5	Total	Report
10 Mar	20:30	'Trentino Diatec'	3–0	Exprivia Molfetta	25–21	25–15	25–20			75–56	Report
13 Mar	17:00	'Exprivia Molfetta'	3–1	Trentino Diatec	25–21	26–24	18–25	25–14		94–84	Report
19 Mar	20:30	'Trentino Diatec'	3–0	Exprivia Molfetta	25–16	32–30	25–17			82–63	Report
27 Mar	18:00	'Exprivia Molfetta'	3–1	Trentino Diatec	22–25	25–21	25–20	25–19		97–85	Report
3 Apr	17:30	'Trentino Diatec'	3–1	Exprivia Molfetta	23–25	25–16	25–18	25–23		98–82	Report

=== Semifinals ===
(Best-of-five playoff)

Date	Time		Score		Set 1	Set 2	Set 3	Set 4	Set 5	Total	Report
9 Apr	18:00	Cucine Lube Civitanova	2–3	Sir Safety Conad Perugia	25–20	20–25	22–25	25–18	13–15	105–103	Report
12 Apr	20:15	Sir Safety Conad Perugia	3–0	Cucine Lube Civitanova	30–28	25–20	25–14			80–62	Report
21 Apr	20:30	Cucine Lube Civitanova	3–2	Sir Safety Conad Perugia	22–25	25–18	14–25	27–25	16–14	104–107	Report
24 Apr	17:30	Sir Safety Conad Perugia	3–0	Cucine Lube Civitanova	25–20	25–23	27-25			77–43	Report

Date	Time		Score		Set 1	Set 2	Set 3	Set 4	Set 5	Total	Report
9 Apr	20:15	DHL Modena	3–1	Trentino Diatec	23–25	26–24	25–19	25–16		99–84	Report
12 Apr	20:30	Trentino Diatec	2–3	DHL Modena	25–21	17–25	25–21	22–25	12–15	101–107	Report
21 Apr	20:30	DHL Modena	1–3	Trentino Diatec	21–25	23–25	25–22	23–25		92–97	Report
25 Apr	19:15	Trentino Diatec	1–3	DHL Modena	25–27	25–21	20–25	19–25		89–98	Report

=== Finals ===
(Best-of-five playoff)

Date	Time		Score		Set 1	Set 2	Set 3	Set 4	Set 5	Total	Report
1 May	18:15	DHL Modena	3–0	Sir Safety Conad Perugia	25–19	25–17	27–25			77–61	Report
5 May	20:15	Sir Safety Conad Perugia	2–3	DHL Modena	25–21	17–25	26–24	23–25	10–15	101–110	Report
8 May	17:30	DHL Modena	3–2	Sir Safety Conad Perugia	23–25	25–20	17–25	25–16	15–13	105–99	Report

== Final standing ==
Rank	Team
1st place, gold medalist(s)	DHL Modena
2nd place, silver medalist(s)	Sir Safety Conad Perugia
3rd place, bronze medalist(s)	Cucine Lube Civitanova
4	Trentino Diatec
5	Calzedonia Verona
6	Exprivia Molfetta
7	Tonazzo Padova
8	Ninfa Latina
9	LPR Piacenza
10	Revivre Milano
11	CMC Romagna
12	Gi Group Monza

2016 Italian Champions

12th title

Nemanja Petrić (c), Santiago Orduna, Jacopo Massari, Salvatore Rossini, Swan N'Gapeth, Earvin N'Gapeth, Kevin Le Roux, Matteo Piano, Maxwell Holt, Dragan Travica, Samuel Onwelo, Nicola Salsi, Luca Vettori
Head coach
Lorenzo Tubertini
