= Daniele Mazzone =

Italian volleyball player (born 1992)

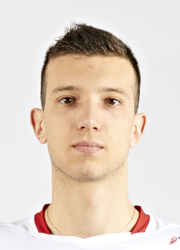

Personal information
- Nationality: Italian
- Born: 4 June 1992 (age 34); Chieri, Italy
- Height: 2.13 m (7 ft 0 in)
- Weight: 88 kg (194 lb)
- Spike: 325 cm (128 in)
- Block: 319 cm (126 in)

Volleyball information
- Position: Middle blocker
- Current club: Cisterna Volley
- Number: 18

Career
Years	Teams
2009–2012; 2012–2013; 2013–2014; 2014–2015; 2015–2017; 2017–2022; 2022-2023; 2023-present	Club Italia; Argos Volley; Exprivia Molfetta; Altotevere Città di Castello; Diatec Trentino; Azimut Modena; Emma Villas; Cisterna Volley

National team
Italy
Honours
Men's Volleyball
Representing Italy
World Grand Champions Cup
Silver medal – second place	2017 Japan
World League
Bronze medal – third place	2013 Mar del Plata
European Championship
Silver medal – second place	2013 Denmark/Poland
- Last updated: 26 December 2017

Daniele Mazzone (born 4 June 1992) is an Italian volleyball player for Cisterna Volley and the Italian national team.

He participated at the 2017 Men's European Volleyball Championship. With the Italian Team he won the Mediterranean Games held in Mersin on 2013, the bronze medal in the FIVB World League 2013, the silver medal in the CEV European Championship 2013. 8 times in the Italian National Team.
