= Elia Bossi =

Italian volleyball player (born 1994)

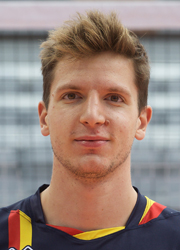

Personal information
- Nationality: Italian
- Born: 15 August 1994 (age 32); Trieste, Italy
- Height: 2.02 m (6 ft 8 in)
- Weight: 90 kg (198 lb)
- Spike: 330 cm (130 in)
- Block: 320 cm (126 in)

Volleyball information
- Current club: Azimut Modena
- Number: 11

Career
Years	Teams
2013–2014; 2014–2015; 2015–2016; 2016–2017; 2017–	Casa Modena; Pallavolo Molfetta; DHL Modena; CMC Ravenna; Azimut Modena

National team
2015–	Italy
- Last updated: 26 December 2017

Elia Bossi (born 15 August 1994) is an Italian male professional volleyball player. He is part of the Italy men's national volleyball team. On club level he plays for Modena Volley.

== Sporting achievements ==
=== CEV Cup ===
- 2022–23 with Valsa Group Modena

=== National championships ===
- 2015/2016 Italian Cup, with DHL Modena Volley
