= Francesco Dall'Olio =

Italian volleyball player

Personal information
- Nationality: Italian
- Born: 30 December 1953 (age 72); Modena, Italy
- Height: 187 cm (6 ft 2 in)

Volleyball information
- Position: Setter
- Number: 5
Honours
Men's volleyball
Representing Italy
Olympic Games
Bronze medal – third place	1984 Los Angeles	Team
World Championship
Silver medal – second place	1978 Italy
Mediterranean Games
Silver medal – second place	1975 Algiers	Team

Francesco Dall'Olio (born 30 December 1953) is a retired Italian volleyball player. He was part of Italian teams that finished second at the 1978 World Championships and 1975 Mediterranean Games; third at the 1984, eighth at the 1976 and ninth at the 1980 Summer Olympics.

In 1995, he started a new career as a volleyball coach, winning the 1997-98 CEV Champions League with Casa Modena Unibon.
