= Andrea Nannini =

Italian volleyball player (1944–2021)

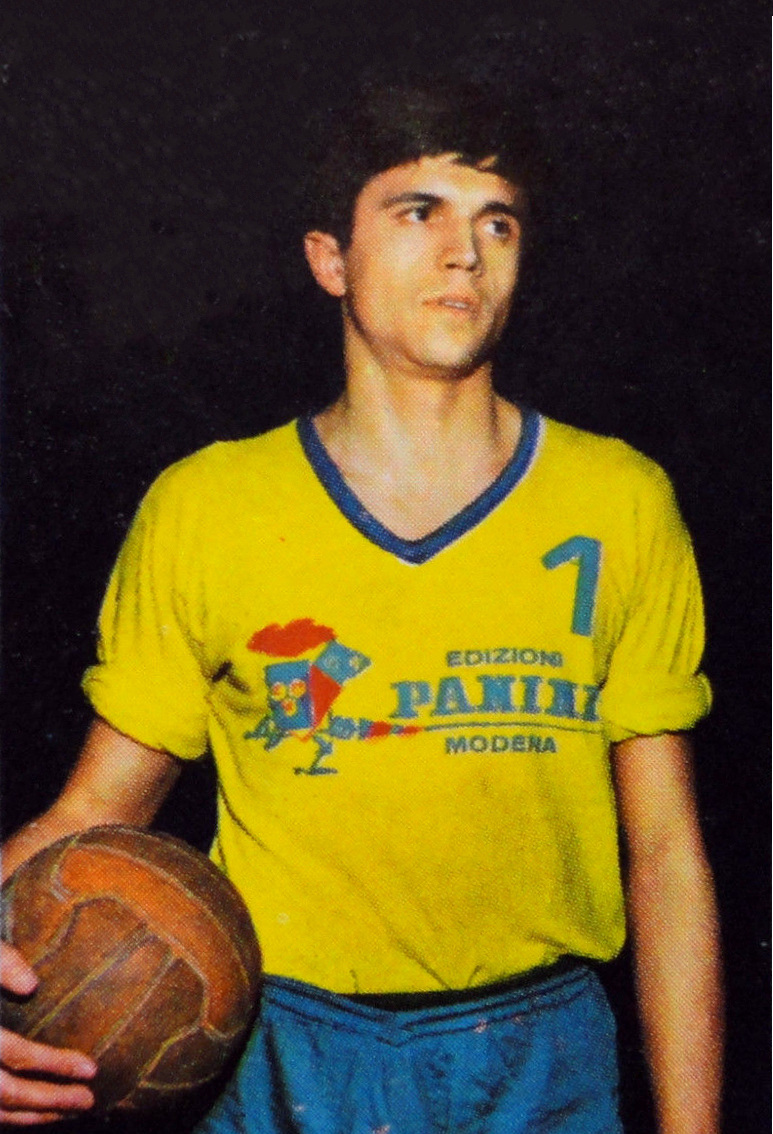
- Nannini with Panini in 1969

Personal information
- Born: 12 December 1944; Modena, Italy
- Died: 1 March 2021 (aged 76)
- Height: 1.84 m (6 ft 0 in)
- Weight: 80 kg (180 lb)

Career
Years	Teams
1961–1964; 1965–1968; 1968–1975; 1975–1976; 1976–1978	(Italy) Minelli Modena (Italy) Ruini Firenze (Italy) Panini Modena (Italy) Pallavolo Torino (Italy) Volley Gonzaga Milano

National team
Italy
Honours
Representing Italy
Summer Universiade
Gold medal – first place	1970 Turin	Team
- Last updated: 13 July 2016

Andrea Nannini
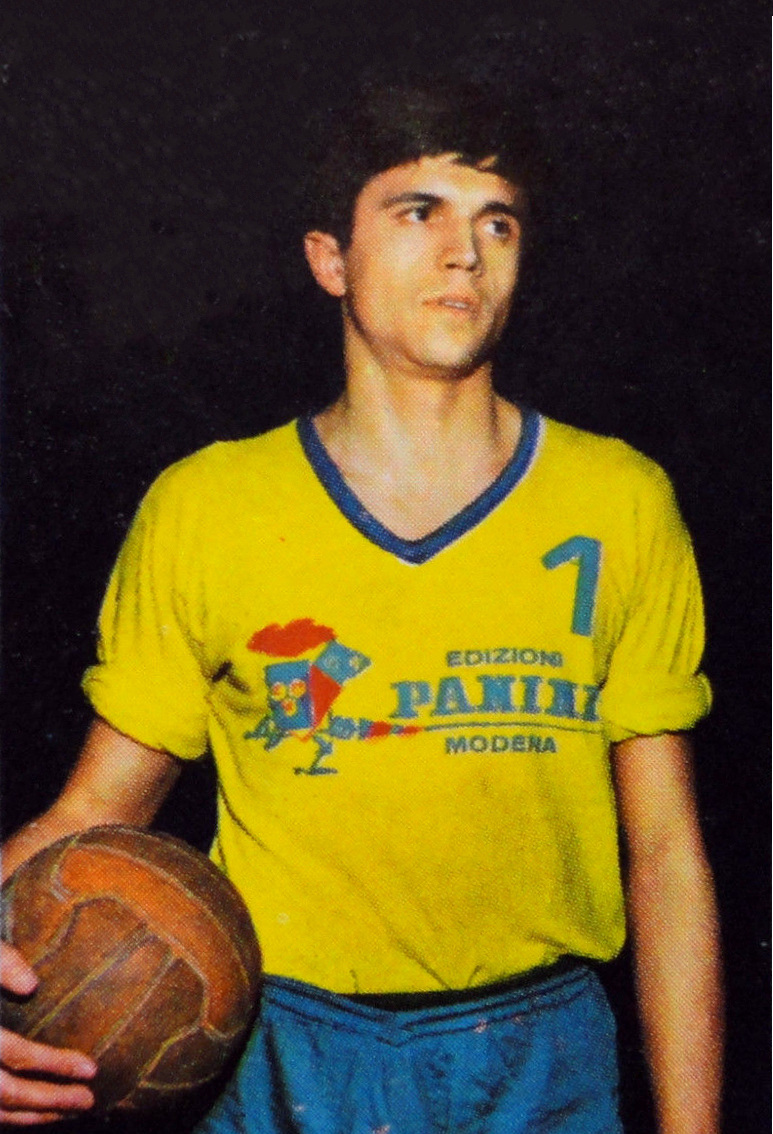
- Nannini with Panini in 1969

Coaching information
Previous teams coached
Years	Teams
1980–81; 1981–83; 1983–85; 1985–86; 1986–91; 1991–92	(Italy) Polisportiva Reggio Emilia (Italy) Volley Gonzaga Milano (Italy) Panini Modena (Italy) Lupi Pallavolo Pisa (Italy) Pencus Bologna (Italy) Virgilio Mantova

Andrea Nannini (12 December 1944 – 1 March 2021) was an Italian volleyball player. He was part of the Italian teams that won the 1970 Summer Universiade and finished in eighth place at the 1976 Summer Olympics.
