= Modena Volley =

Italian professional volleyball team

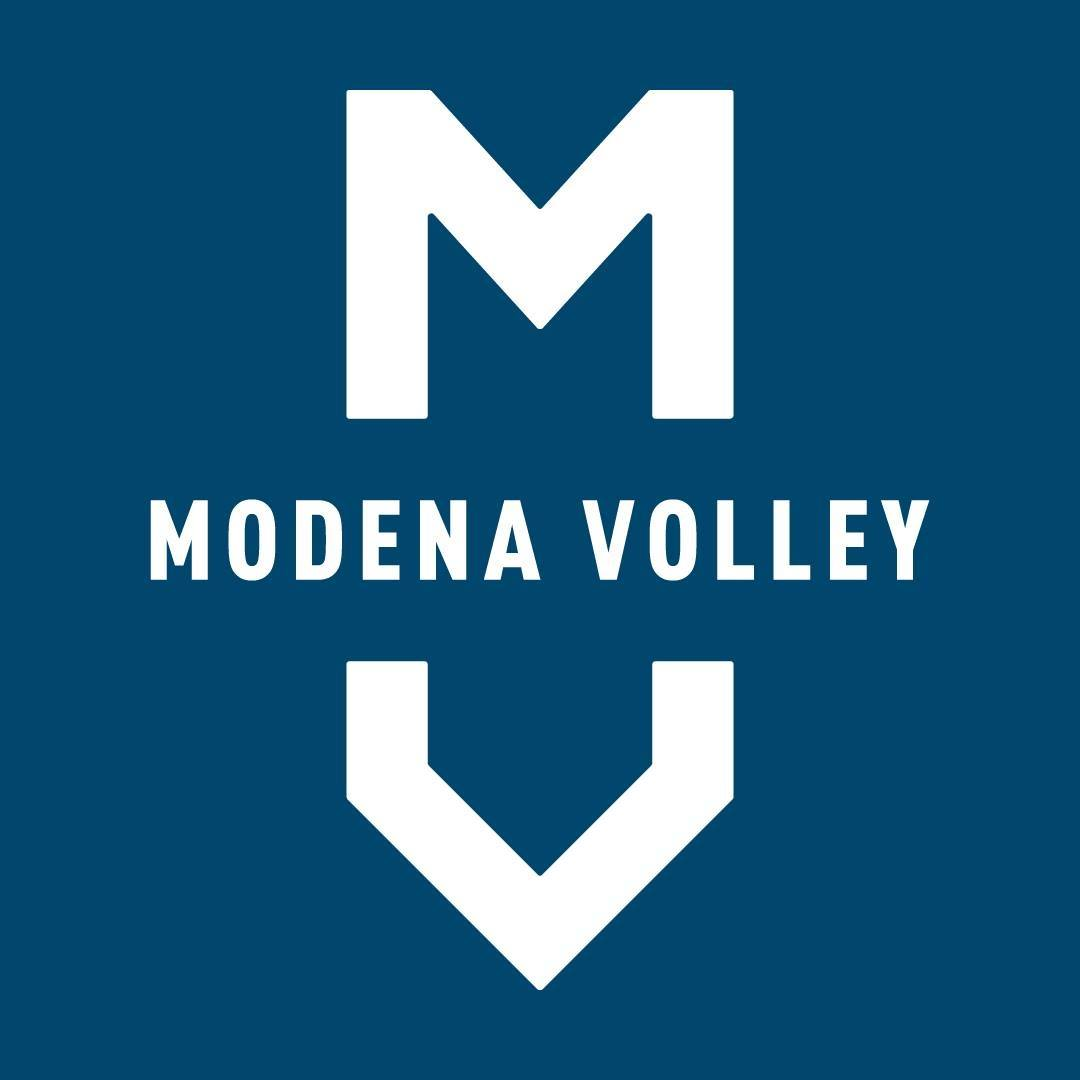
- Full name: Valsa Group Modena
- Short name: Modena Volley
- Founded: 1966
- Ground: PalaPanini, Modena (Capacity: 4,968)
- Chairman: Catia Pedrini
- Manager: Lorenzo Tubertini
- Captain: Luke Perry
- League: Lega Pallavolo Serie A
- Website: Club home page

Uniforms
Home	Away

Modena Volley is a professional volleyball team based in Modena, Italy. It has played in the highest level of the Italian Volleyball League without interruption since 1968. It is the most successful Italian club, having won both the national league and the national cup twelve times each. The club is one of the most prominent and prestigious in Europe too, having won thirteen European trophies including four CEV Champions League.

== Achievements ==
- CEV Champions League
  (x4) 1990, 1996, 1997, 1998
  (x4) 1987, 1988, 1989, 2003
  (x1) 1991
- CEV Cup
  (x4) 1980, 1986, 1995, 2023
  (x1) 2007
- CEV Challenge Cup
  (x5) 1983, 1984, 1985, 2004, 2008
  (x2) 2000, 2001
- CEV SuperCup
  (x1) 1995
  (x2) 1990, 1997
- Italian Championship
  (x12) 1970, 1972, 1974, 1976, 1986, 1987, 1988, 1989, 1995, 1997, 2002, 2016
- Italian Cup
  (x12) 1979, 1980, 1985, 1986, 1988, 1989, 1994, 1995, 1997, 1998, 2015, 2016
- Italian SuperCup
  (x4) 1997, 2015, 2016, 2018

== History ==
The club was founded in 1966 by Benito and Giuseppe Panini, owners of Edizioni Panini publishing house, and was named Gruppo Sportivo Panini (or simply G.S. Panini). The club, trained by Franco Anderlini, started from Serie C (the third level of the Italian League) and achieved the Serie A in 1968, taking only two seasons. Since then it has never been relegated to lower divisions.

It took only another season to achieve the first Italian League, in 1969/70: the victory was led by the Czechoslovak superstar Josef Musil. With Anderlini as head coach Modena won three championships, but in 1975/76 he resigned and was replaced by Polish Edward Skorek who acted as player-coach, leading Panini to another national title. By the end of the 1970s Modena clinched four Italian leagues, two Italian cups and its first European trophy, the 1979/80 CEV Cup Winners' Cup, with the Brazilian Bernard Rajzman and the Italian Francesco Dall'Olio as leaders of the team.

In the 1980s Modena had even greater successes: managed by Julio Velasco the team gained four consecutive Italian leagues and many national and international cups. In 1989 Velasco was appointed head of the Italian national team, leaving Modena where he was replaced by Vladimir Jankovic. Even without Velasco, Modena became European champion winning the 1989/90 CEV Champions League.

Daytona Volley logo (1994–2005).

The team entered the 1990s with financial difficulties and its best players (Vullo, Bernardi, Bertoli, Cantagalli, Lucchetta) left Modena moving to better funded clubs. The Panini era was coming to an end and in 1993 the club changed ownership for the first time, being taken over by Giovanni Vandelli, a ceramic industrialist who renamed the club as Daytona Volley. Vandelli signed Daniele Bagnoli as head coach and brought back Bertoli, Cantagalli and Vullo. Modena soon regained its competitiveness and in five seasons it won twelve trophies, including two Italian Leagues and two CEV Champions Leagues. The 1996/97 season could be regarded as one of the most successful in the club's long history, having achieved the Italian League, the Italian Cup and the Champions League in the same year. The line-up of this legendary season was structured by the setter Fabio Vullo, the opposite hitter Juan Cuminetti, the middle-blockers Bas van de Goor and Andrea Giani, the outside hitters Marco Bracci and Luca Cantagalli: one of the best European teams ever.

1996 was also the year of Giuseppe Panini's death, co-founder and for many years the highly respected president of the club. The municipal administration of Modena entitled the local arena, home of the volleyball team, to his memory as Palazzo dello Sport Giuseppe Panini, commonly referred to as PalaPanini by supporters. In 1997/98, trained by Francesco Dall'Olio, Modena won his third consecutive CEV Champions League. After an unsuccessful comeback of Daniele Bagnoli, Vandelli's club won its last Italian league in 2001/02 with Angelo Lorenzetti as coach.

Pallavolo Modena logo (2005–2013).

Vandelli's last trophy was the 2003/04 CEV Cup (now Challenge Cup), then in 2005 he sold the club to a consortium composed of Antonio Barone (a coal industry businessman and former volleyball player, who won two Italian leagues with the Panini team), Catia Pedrini (Barone's wife) and Giuliano Grani (a merchandising businessman). The name was changed to Pallavolo Modena and Barone became the new president.

During 2008 Barone e Pedrini left the club leaving it in the hands of Grani and new partner Pietro Peia (a long-standing manager of the club). In 2012 even Grani took a step back, leaving Peia as the sole owner. Under the Barone-Grani-Peia ownership Modena won only one trophy with the 2007/08 CEV Challenge Cup, despite great investments to sign notable players like Ángel Dennis, Murilo Endres and Matthew Anderson, and many successive famous coaches like Julio Velasco, Andrea Giani, Silvano Prandi, Daniele Bagnoli (at his third experience at Modena) and Angelo Lorenzetti.

Modena Volley logo (2013–2014).

In May 2013 a new consortium composed of Gino Gibertini (dealer of oil products), Antonio Panini (son of Giuseppe Panini), Catia Pedrini, Dino Piacentini (building contractor) and Peter Zehentleitner (CEO of Trenkwalder Italia) acquired the club. Both Gibertini and Piacentini were Panini's players in the seventies. The club's name was changed to Modena Volley Punto Zero with Gibertini as president and Lorenzetti being confirmed as head coach.

The team's entire identity was created by Italian-Argentine graphic designer Hernán Pesce (https://hpesce.myportfolio.com/), who at the time was working as a designer for Trenkwalder Italia, the team's main sponsor. The logo and visual identity were the result of an exhaustive analysis and coincided with a highly successful period for the team.

The coexistence between many partners proved to be difficult and after few months Gibertini, Panini and Zehentleitner left the consortium. Catia Pedrini was then appointed president of the club with Piacentini in the role of vice-president.

For the 2014–15 season the club's name has been modified to Modena Volley with a new logo. On 11 January 2015, the team won its first title in 7 years (the last victory was the CEV Challenge Cup in 2008), by defeating Trentino Volley in the final of Italian Volleyball Cup.

For the 2015–2016 season Modena decides to strengthen the team by adding the Brazilian middle-blocker Lucas Saatkamp, and replacing Uroš Kovačević with his Serbian compatriot Miloš Nikić. Since October 2015, the club sets a major sponsorship deal with DHL. During the season, the club enlarged his honours with the victories of Italian Supercup in October and the Italian Volleyball Cup in February, by defeating Trentino Volley in both matches. Above all, the main success of the season has been the Italian national title after 14 years, by defeating SIR Safety Perugia in the final by 3–0.

For the 2016–2017 season, there are many changes: the main sponsor DHL and coach Angelo Lorenzetti leave the club, moreover the Brazilians "magic duo" Bruno Rezende and Lucas Saatkamp return to their home country. Nevertheless, Modena reinforces the roster by hiring two of the best middle blockers in the world: Maxwell Holt and Kevin Le Roux. The expert Argentinian setter Santiago Orduna takes place of Bruninho and the Serbian spiker Nemanja Petric is promoted as team Captain. Since September 2016, the new main sponsor of the club is the Italian asset management company Azimut Holding.

== Former names ==
1968–1989	Panini Modena
1989–1991	Philips Modena
1991–1992	Carimonte Modena
1992–1993	Panini Modena
1993–1994	Daytona Modena
1994–1995	Daytona Las Modena
1995–1996	Las Daytona Modena
1996–1997	Las Daytona Modena; Las Valtur Modena^{[a]}
1997–2000	Casa Modena Unibon
2000–2002	Casa Modena Salumi
2002–2003	Kerakoll Modena; Meta Daytona Modena^{[b]}
2003–2004	Kerakoll Modena
2004–2005	Daytona Modena
2005–2008	Cimone Modena
2008–2010	Trenkwalder Modena
2010–2014	Casa Modena
2014–2015	Modena Volley; Parmareggio Modena^{[c]}
2015–2016	DHL Modena
2016–2018	Azimut Modena
2018–2019	Azimut Leo Shoes Modena
2019–2021	Leo Shoes Modena
2021–2022	Leo Shoes PerkinElmer Modena
2022–Present	Valsa Group Modena

- ^{a} Only at CEV Champions Cup
- ^{b} Only at Italian SuperCup
- ^{c} Since 28 February 2015

== Team ==
Team roster – season 2022/2023

No.	Name	Date of birth	Position
1	(Brazil) Bruno Rezende (C)	July 2, 1986 (age 40)	setter
3	(Australia) Lorenzo Pope	December 6, 2001 (age 24)	outside hitter
4	(France) Nicolas Maréchal	March 4, 1987 (age 39)	outside hitter
5	(Italy) Riccardo Gollini	July 5, 2000 (age 26)	libero
6	(Italy) Giovanni Sanguinetti	April 14, 2000 (age 26)	middle blocker
7	(Serbia) Dragan Stanković	October 18, 1985 (age 40)	middle blocker
9	(France) Earvin N'Gapeth	February 12, 1991 (age 35)	outside hitter
10	(Italy) Lorenzo Sala	January 1, 2002 (age 24)	opposite
11	(Germany) Tobias Krick	October 22, 1998 (age 27)	middle blocker
12	(Turkey) Adis Lagumdzija	March 29, 1999 (age 27)	opposite
15	(Italy) Elia Bossi	August 15, 1994 (age 32)	middle blocker
16	(Italy) Nicola Salsi	September 13, 1997 (age 29)	setter
21	(Italy) Salvatore Rossini	July 13, 1986 (age 40)	libero
24	(Italy) Andrea Malvasi	June 23, 2005 (age 21)	outside hitter
90	(Italy) Tommaso Rinaldi	November 9, 2001 (age 24)	outside hitter
Head coach: (Italy) Alberto Giuliani; Assistant: (Argentina) Sebastian Carotti

Team roster – season 2021/2022
No.	Name	Date of birth	Position
1	(Brazil) Bruno Rezende (C)	July 2, 1986 (age 40)	setter
3	(Netherlands) Maarten van Garderen	January 24, 1990 (age 36)	outside hitter
5	(Italy) Riccardo Gollini	July 5, 2000 (age 26)	libero
6	(Italy) Giovanni Sanguinetti	April 14, 2000 (age 26)	middle blocker
7	(Italy) Dragan Stanković	October 18, 1985 (age 40)	middle blocker
8	(France) Swan N'Gapeth	January 9, 1992 (age 34)	outside hitter
9	(France) Earvin N'Gapeth	February 12, 1991 (age 35)	outside hitter
10	(Italy) Lorenzo Sala	January 1, 2002 (age 24)	opposite
14	(Netherlands) Nimir Abdel-Aziz	February 5, 1992 (age 34)	opposite
16	(Italy) Nicola Salsi	September 13, 1997 (age 29)	setter
17	(Brazil) Yoandy Leal	August 31, 1988 (age 38)	outside hitter
18	(Italy) Daniele Mazzone	June 4, 1992 (age 34)	middle blocker
21	(Italy) Salvatore Rossini	July 13, 1986 (age 40)	libero
Head coach: (Italy) Andrea Giani

Team roster – season 2020/2021
Leo Shoes Modena
No.	Name	Date of birth	Position
1	(Italy) Tommaso Rinaldi	November 9, 2001	outside hitter
2	(Cuba) Luis Estrada Mazorra	March 10, 2000	outside hitter
3	(Italy) Nicola Iannelli	March 3, 1999	libero
4	(Serbia) Nemanja Petric	July 28, 1987	outside hitter
5	(Italy) Paolo Porro	October 27, 2001	setter
6	(Italy) Giovanni Sanguinetti	April 14, 2000	middle blocker
7	(Italy) Dragan Stanković	October 18, 1985	middle blocker
10	(France) Jenia Grebennikov	August 13, 1990	libero
11	(United States) Micah Christenson (C)	May 8, 1993	setter
13	(Germany) Moritz Karlitzek	August 12, 1996	outside hitter
14	(Italy) Luca Vettori	April 26, 1991	opposite
15	(Italy) Elia Bossi	August 15, 1994	middle blocker
17	(Austria) Paul Buchegger	March 4, 1996	opposite
18	(Italy) Daniele Mazzone	June 4, 1992	middle blocker
19	(Italy) Daniele Lavia	November 4, 1999	outside hitter
Head coach: (Italy) Andrea Giani; Assistant: Sebastian Carotti

Team roster – season 2019/2020
Leo Shoes Modena
No.	Name	Date of birth	Position
1	(United States) Matthew Anderson	April 18, 1987	outside hitter
2	(Cuba) Luis Estrada Mazorra	March 10, 2000	outside hitter
3	(Italy) Nicola Iannelli	March 3, 1999	libero
5	(Italy) Andrea Truocchio	February 10, 2000	middle blocker
6	(Italy) Giovanni Sanguinetti	April 14, 2000	middle blocker
7	(Italy) Salvatore Rossini	July 13, 1986	libero
8	(Italy) Giulio Pinali	April 2, 1997	outside hitter
9	(Italy) Ivan Zaytsev	October 2, 1988	opposite
10	(Poland) Bartosz Bednorz	July 25, 1994	outside hitter
11	(United States) Micah Christenson	May 8, 1993	setter
12	(United States) Maxwell Holt	March 12, 1987	middle blocker
15	(Italy) Elia Bossi	August 15, 1994	middle blocker
16	(Italy) Nicola Salsi	September 13, 1997	setter
18	(Italy) Daniele Mazzone	June 4, 1992	middle blocker
20	(Italy) Matteo Lusetti	August 6, 2002	setter
23	(Italy) Tommaso Rinaldi	November 9, 2001	outside hitter
90	(Germany) Denis Kaliberda	June 24, 1990	outside hitter
Head coach: Andrea Giani; Assistant: Luca Cantagalli

Team roster – season 2018/2019
Azimut Leo Shoes Modena
No.	Name	Date of birth	Position
1	(Poland) Bartosz Bednorz	July 25, 1994	outside hitter
2	(France) Kevin Tillie	November 2, 1990	outside hitter
3	(Italy) Lorenzo Benvenuti	July 8, 1994	libero
4	(Italy) Marco Pierotti	June 19, 1996	outside hitter
5	(Netherlands) Luuc Van der Ent	July 27, 1997	middle blocker
7	(Italy) Salvatore Rossini	July 13, 1986	libero
8	(Italy) Giulio Pinali	April 2, 1997	outside hitter
9	(Italy) Ivan Zaytsev	October 2, 1988	opposite
10	(United States) Jennings Franciskovic	May 10, 1995	setter
11	(United States) Micah Christenson	May 8, 1993	setter
12	(United States) Maxwell Holt	March 12, 1987	middle blocker
13	(Italy) Simone Anzani	February 24, 1992	middle blocker
14	(Italy) Andrea Truocchio	February 10, 2000	middle blocker
16	(Italy) Matteo Lusetti	August 6, 2002	setter
17	(Slovenia) Tine Urnaut	September 3, 1988	outside hitter
18	(Italy) Daniele Mazzone	June 4, 1992	middle blocker
24	(Germany) Denys Kaliberda	June 24, 1990	outside hitter
25	(Netherlands) Wessel Keemink	May 29, 1993	setter
Head coach: Julio Velasco; Assistant: Luca Cantagalli

Team roster – season 2017/2018
Azimut Modena
No.	Name	Date of birth	Position
1	(Brazil) Bruno Rezende	July 2, 1986	setter
2	(United States) Jennings Franciskovic	May 10, 1995	setter
3	(Italy) Andrea Argenta	June 1, 1996	outside hitter
4	(Netherlands) Maarten Van Garderen	January 24, 1990	outside hitter
6	(Italy) Federico Tosi	September 18, 1991	libero
7	(Italy) Salvatore Rossini	July 13, 1986	libero
8	(France) Swan N'Gapeth	January 9, 1992	outside hitter
9	(France) Earvin N'Gapeth	February 12, 1991	outside hitter
10	(Italy) Giulio Sabbi	August 10, 1989	opposite
11	(Italy) Elia Bossi	August 15, 1994	middle blocker
12	(United States) Maxwell Holt	March 12, 1987	middle blocker
14	(Italy) Alberto Marra	November 18, 1998	middle blocker
15	(Italy) Giulio Pinali	April 2, 1997	outside hitter
16	(Bulgaria) Chono Penchev	December 11, 1994	setter
17	(Slovenia) Tine Urnaut	September 3, 1988	outside hitter
18	(Italy) Daniele Mazzone	June 4, 1992	middle blocker
Head coach: Radostin Stoytchev; Assistant: Dario Simoni

Team roster – season 2016/2017
Azimut Modena
No.	Name	Date of birth	Position
4	(Serbia) Nemanja Petrić (C)	July 28, 1987	outside hitter
5	(Argentina) Santiago Orduna	August 31, 1983	setter
6	(Italy) Jacopo Massari	June 2, 1988	outside hitter
7	(Italy) Salvatore Rossini	July 13, 1986	libero
8	(France) Swan N'Gapeth	January 9, 1992	outside hitter
9	(France) Earvin N'Gapeth	February 12, 1991	outside hitter
10	(France) Kevin Le Roux	May 11, 1989	middle blocker
11	(Italy) Matteo Piano	October 24, 1990	middle blocker
12	(United States) Maxwell Holt	March 12, 1987	middle blocker
13	(Italy) Dragan Travica	August 28, 1986	setter
14	(Italy) Samuel Onwelo	April 18, 1997	opposite
16	(Italy) Nicola Salsi	September 13, 1997	setter
17	(Italy) Luca Vettori	April 26, 1991	opposite
Head coach: Lorenzo Tubertini

Team roster – season 2015/2016
DHL Modena
No.	Name	Date of birth	Position
1	(Brazil) Bruno Rezende (C)	July 2, 1986	setter
2	(Italy) Fabio Donadio	April 30, 1988	libero
4	(Serbia) Nemanja Petrić	July 28, 1987	outside hitter
5	(Italy) Pietro Soli	September 15, 1994	setter
6	(Italy) Alberto Casadei	February 6, 1984	opposite
7	(Italy) Salvatore Rossini	July 13, 1986	libero
8	(Italy) Luca Sartoretti	November 20, 1995	outside hitter
9	(France) Earvin N'Gapeth	February 12, 1991	outside hitter
10	(Serbia) Miloš Nikić	March 31, 1986	outside hitter
11	(Italy) Matteo Piano	October 24, 1990	middle blocker
12	(Italy) Elia Bossi	August 15, 1994	middle blocker
14	(Nigeria) Samuel Onwelo	April 18, 1997	opposite
15	(Brazil) Thiago Sens	July 2, 1985	outside hitter
16	(Brazil) Lucas Saatkamp	March 6, 1986	middle blocker
17	(Italy) Luca Vettori	April 26, 1991	opposite
18	(Italy) Nicholas Sighinolfi	August 11, 1994	middle blocker
Head coach: Angelo Lorenzetti; Assistant: Lorenzo Tubertini

== Notable players ==
The stars indicate Volleyball Hall of Fame inductees.

1980–1983	(Italy) Andrea Anastasi
2012–2013	(Italy) Michele Baranowicz
1969–1973	(Italy) Antonio Barone
1985–1989; 2005–2007	(Italy) Davide Bellini
1985–1990	(Italy) Lorenzo Bernardi
1983–1990; 1993–1994	(Italy) Franco Bertoli
2000–2003	(Italy) Vigor Bovolenta
1994–1998	(Italy) Marco Bracci
1980–1990; 1993–1998; 2000–2004	(Italy) Luca Cantagalli
1971–1981; 1984–1986; 1994–1995	(Italy) Francesco Dall'Olio
1986–1987	(Italy) Ferdinando De Giorgi
2001–2003	(Italy) Andrea Gardini
1996–2008	(Italy) Andrea Giani
1968–1978	(Italy) Rodolfo Giovenzana
1981–1990; 1998–2000	(Italy) Andrea Lucchetta
2005–2006	(Italy) Luigi Mastrangelo
1968–1980	(Italy) Paolo Montorsi
1968–1975	(Italy) Andrea Nannini
1990–1994; 2000–2006	(Italy) Damiano Pippi
1980–1984	(Italy) Stefano Recine
1996–1997; 2005–2009	(Italy) Andrea Sartoretti
1968–1981	(Italy) Stefano Sibani
2003–2005; 2008–2009; 2017	(Italy) Dragan Travica
1986–1990; 1994–2000	(Italy) Fabio Vullo
2018–2020	(Italy) Ivan Zaytsev
2017–2022	(Italy) Daniele Mazzone
2007–2012	(Cuba) / (Italy) Ángel Dennis

1982–1986	(Argentina) Esteban Martinez
1990–1993	(Argentina) Hugo Conte
1993–2000	(Argentina) Juan Cuminetti
1990–1993	(Argentina) Waldo Kantor
1984–1986; 1987–1988	(Argentina) Raúl Quiroga
2010–2012	(Russia) Yury Berezhko
1998–2002	(Russia) Aleksey Kazakov
1997–1998	(Russia) Evgeni Mitkov
1993–1995	(Russia) Ruslan Olikhver
2000–2004	(Russia) Roman Yakovlev
1994–2000	(Netherlands) Bas van de Goor
2000–2002	(Netherlands) Guido Görtzen
2008–2011	(Netherlands) Wytze Kooistra
2009–2012	(Netherlands) Dick Kooy
2021–2022	(Netherlands) Maarten van Garderen
2021–2022	(Netherlands) Nimir Abdel-Aziz
2013–2014	(Poland) Zbigniew Bartman
1975–1977	(Poland) Edward Skorek
2013–2014	(Germany) Lukas Kampa
1968–1970	(Czech Republic) Josef Musil
2004–2005	(Czech Republic) Jan Štokr
1978–1980	(Brazil) Bernard Rajzman
2003–2007	(Brazil) Luiz Felipe Fonteles
1992–1994	(Brazil) Maurício Lima
2002–2003; 2004–2005	(Brazil) Dante Amaral
2005–2008	(Brazil) Ricardo Garcia
2006–2007	(Brazil) Nalbert Bitencourt
2006–2009	(Brazil) Murilo Endres
2006–2009	(Brazil) Sidão
2007–2008	(Brazil) André Heller
2007–2008	(Brazil) André Nascimento
2021–2022	(Brazil) Yoandy Leal
2011; 2014–2016; 2017–2018; 2021–	(Brazil) Bruno Rezende
2015–2018; 2021–	(France) Earvin N'Gapeth
2020–2021	(France) Jenia Grebennikov
2011–2012	(Bulgaria) Viktor Yosifov
2011–2012; 2019–2020	(United States) Matt Anderson
2000–2004	(United States) Lloy Ball
2008–2009	(United States) David Lee
2016–2020	(United States) Maxwell Holt
2018–2021	(United States) Micah Christenson
1988–1990	(United States) Doug Partie
2012–2015	(Serbia) Uroš Kovačević
2014–2017; 2020–2021	(Serbia) Nemanja Petrić

== Presidents ==
1966–1993	Giuseppe Panini
1993–2005	Giovanni Vandelli
2005–2007	Antonio Barone
2007–2012	Giuliano Grani
2012–2013	Pietro Peia
2013	Gino Gibertini
2013–2022	Catia Pedrini
2022–Present	Giulia Gabana

== Head coaches ==
Name	Nationality	Years
Franco Anderlini	(Italy)	1966–1975
Edward Skorek	(Poland)	1975–1978
Gian Paolo Guidetti	(Italy)	1978–1983
Andrea Nannini	(Italy)	1983–1985
Julio Velasco	(Argentina)	1985–1989
Vladimir Janković	(Socialist Federal Republic of Yugoslavia)	1989–1990
Massimo Barbolini	(Italy)	1990–1992
Bernardo Rezende	(Brazil)	1992–1993
Daniele Bagnoli	(Italy)	1993–1997^{[a]}
Franco Bertoli	(Italy)	1996–1997^{[a]}
Francesco Dall'Olio	(Italy)	1997–1998
Bruno Bagnoli	(Italy)	1998–2000^{[b]}
Franco Bertoli	(Italy)	2000^{[b]}
Daniele Bagnoli	(Italy)	2000–2001
Angelo Lorenzetti	(Italy)	2001–2004^{[c]}
Maurizio Menarini	(Italy)	2004^{[c]}
Julio Velasco	(Argentina)	2004–2006
Bruno Bagnoli	(Italy)	2006–2007
Andrea Giani	(Italy)	2007–2008^{[d]}
Emanuele Zanini	(Italy)	2008–2009^{[d]}
Silvano Prandi	(Italy)	2009–2011^{[e]}
Daniele Bagnoli	(Italy)	2011–2012^{[e]}
Angelo Lorenzetti	(Italy)	2012–2016
Roberto Piazza	(Italy)	2016–2017^{[f]}
Lorenzo Tubertini	(Italy)	2017^{[f]}
Radostin Stoychev	(Bulgaria)	2017–2018
Julio Velasco	(Argentina)	2018–2019
Andrea Giani	(Italy)	2019–2023
Francesco Petrella	(Italy)	2023–Present

- ^{a} In November 1996 Daniele Bagnoli suffered serious injuries from a car accident and was replaced by Bertoli until his recovery.
- ^{b} In February 2000 Bruno Bagnoli was sacked and replaced by Bertoli.
- ^{c} In January 2004 Lorenzetti was dismissed and replaced by the assistant coach Menarini.
- ^{d} In December 2008 Giani was sacked and replaced by Zanini.
- ^{e} In January 2011 Prandi was dismissed and replaced by Daniele Bagnoli.
- ^{f} In February 2017 Piazza and the club agreed to terminate the contract. He was replaced by the assistant coach Tubertini.

== Kit manufacturer ==
The table below shows the history of kit providers for the Modena team.

Period	Kit provider
1985–1989	Best Company
1989–2003	Asics
2003–2005	A-Line
2005–2017	Macron
2017–2021	Erreà
2021–current	Ninesquared
