= Cisterna Volley =

Italian professional volleyball team

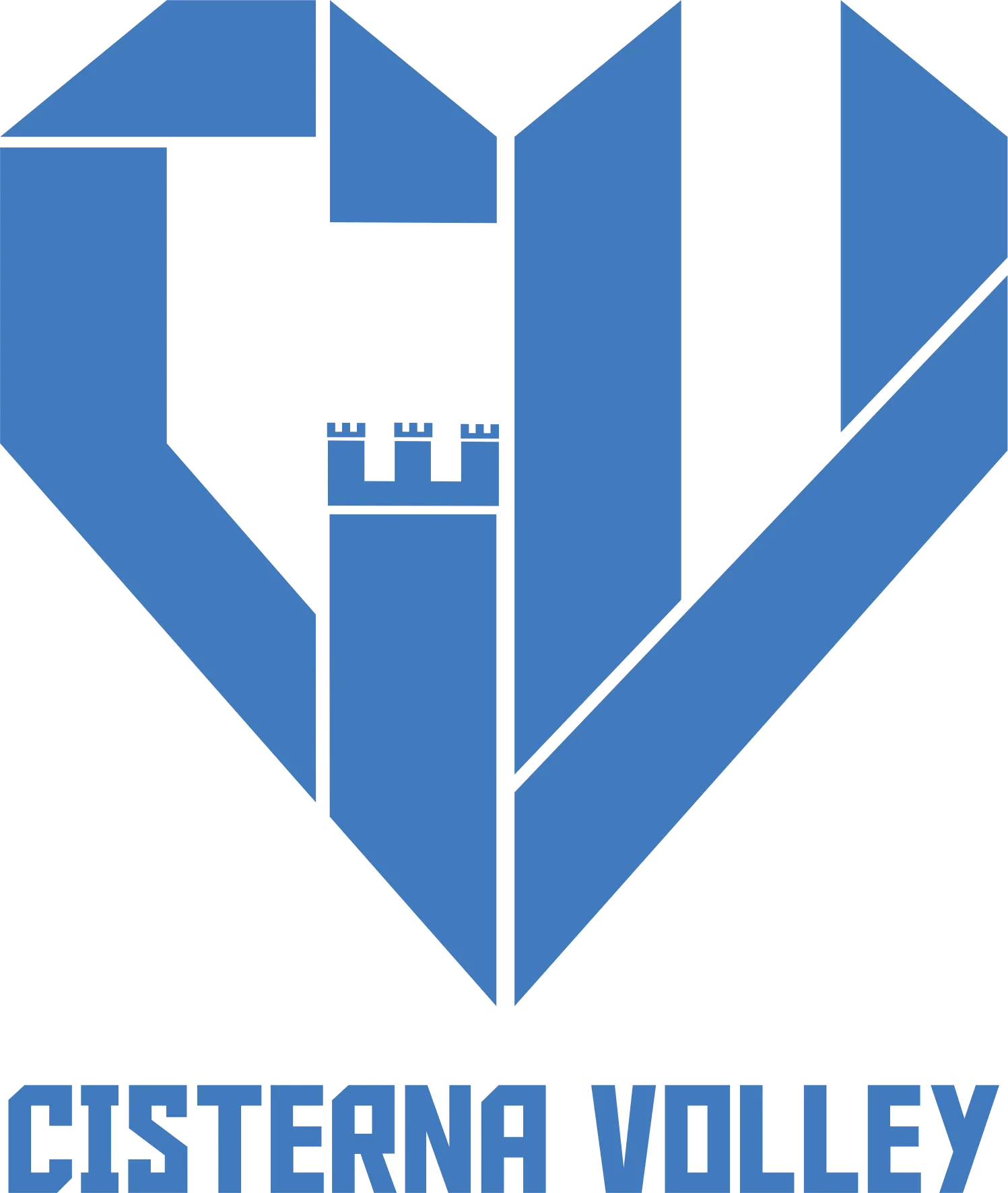
- Full name: Cisterna Volley
- Short name: Cisterna Volley
- Founded: 2023
- Ground: PalaCisterna; Cisterna di Latina (Capacity: 3,000)
- Chairman: Luigi Iazzetta
- Captain: Efe Bayram
- League: Italian Volleyball League
- Website: Club home page

Uniforms
| Home | Away |

Cisterna Volley is a professional volleyball team based in Cisterna di Latina playing the highest level of the Italian Volleyball League.

== History ==
The team was founded in 2023 after acquiring the league membership of the Top Volley Latina, which had chosen to focus only on its youth teams. The new team inherited part of the managerial staff from the Top Volley but it had to basically rebuild the team from scratch. Nevertheless, the team debut on the 2023–24 SuperLega season achieving 8th place. In the next season, it qualifies for the first time to the Coppa Italia where it gets eliminated in the quarter-finals.

== Team ==
=== Season 2024–25 ===
| N° | Nome | Date of birth | Role |
|---|---|---|---|
| 3 | (Italy) Alessandro Fanizza | setter | December 11, 2004 (age 21) |
| 4 | (Italy) Alessandro Finauri | libero | May 5, 2004 (age 21) |
| 7 | (Spain) Jordi Ramón | outside hitter | July 9, 1999 (age 26) |
| 8 | (Italy) Domenico Pace | libero | August 2, 2000 (age 25) |
| 9 | (Japan) Yuga Tarumi | outside hitter | November 2, 2000 (age 25) |
| 10 | (Italy) Jacopo Tosti | middle blocker | January 1, 2008 (age 18) |
| 11 | (France) Théo Faure | opposite | October 12, 1999 (age 26) |
| 12 | (Italy) Enrico Diamantini | middle blocker | April 4, 1993 (age 32) |
| 14 | (Austria) Michael Czerwiński | opposite | September 7, 2003 (age 22) |
| 17 | (Italy) Michele Baranowicz | setter | August 5, 1989 (age 36) |
| 18 | (Italy) Daniele Mazzone | middle blocker | June 4, 1992 (age 33) |
| 19 | (Venezuela) Willner Rivas | outside hitter | April 2, 1995 (age 30) |
| 20 | (Turkey) Efe Bayram | outside hitter | March 1, 2002 (age 23) |
| 29 | (Serbia) Aleksandar Nedeljković | middle blocker | October 23, 1997 (age 28) |
Head coach: (Spain) Guillermo Falasca; Assistant: (Italy) Roberto Cocconi

== Head coaches ==
| Name | Nationality | Years |
|---|---|---|
| Guillermo Falasca | (Spain) | 2023–Present |
