= Trenkwalder Group =

Austrian services company

Trenkwalder Group AG
- Company type: Public
- Industry: Temporary employment, Personnel services
- Founded: 1985
- Headquarters: Vienna, Austria
- Key people: Mark Pollok (CEO)
- Revenue: 600 million Euro (2024)
- Number of employees: 20,000 (2024)
- Website: www.group.trenkwalder.com

The Trenkwalder Group AG is a full-service outsourcing human resources and personnel employment provider in CEE in 15 European countries. Trenkwalder expanded through numerous acquisitions in Austria and abroad and has more than 200 locations. The company is a market leader in Austria and Hungary. Since 2011, it has been part of the Droege Group.

== Company history ==
=== 1985 to 2002 ===
The Engineer Richard Trenkwalder founded the company in 1985 in Schwadorf. Through professional activities abroad, he was familiar with the leasing of specialists. He initially operated his company with around 30 employees. Trenkwalder is one of the companies that have held a license for personnel leasing since 1988, when these were first granted in Austria.

By establishing branches and through acquisitions and partial acquisitions of competitors in Austria, the company expanded in its home country. In 1998, Trenkwalder ranked behind Austria's Manpower (now: Powerserv) and Adecco in third place; in 2000, it became the market leader in Austria.

In 1992, Trenkwalder opened its first foreign branch in the Slovak capital Bratislava. Since 1999, the company has been active in Germany and Hungary. The following year, it entered the market in Czechia and in Italy, and in 2001, it began market entry in Slovenia.

From 1998 to 2000, Trenkwalder was among the fastest-growing companies in Europe each year. However, the company's growth stalled in 2001 and 2002. In 1993, the company employed 80 people and had sales of 80 million ATS; by 2002, Trenkwalder had 7,000 employees and generated sales of 192 million euros. The previous rapid growth led to turbulence. Additionally, a large part of the management in Italy temporarily left for a competitor.

=== 2003 to 2011 ===
At the beginning of 2003, German Capiton AG acquired 25.4 percent of the company's shares for 10 million euros. This investment strengthened Trenkwalder's equity and enabled further expansion. In 2003, the company began operations in Croatia. In October 2003, Trenkwalder acquired a majority stake in the Multi-Man Group, becoming the market leader in Hungary. In 2004, the company also achieved market leadership in Slovakia. The following year, Trenkwalder became the largest provider in Czechia through the partial acquisition of Kappa People. In November 2005, Trenkwalder entered the Polish market by purchasing a majority stake in a Polish provider (Partner Sp. z o.o.). Trenkwalder also started operations in Romania and Serbia in 2005. The partial acquisition (80 percent) of MSE Personal Services AG marked the company's entry into the Liechtenstein market in early 2006. Activities also began in Switzerland in 2006, followed by the acquisition of City Job AG and the PL Group the following year. In 2007, Trenkwalder expanded into the markets of Bulgaria, Montenegro, Bosnia and Herzegovina, Macedonia, and Turkey.

In 2007, Trenkwalder also repurchased the shares of Capiton AG for 50 million euros. That same year, the corporate structure changed: Trenkwalder International AG became the holding company for international business, while the business in Austria was spun off into a separate entity, Trenkwalder Personaldienste GmbH. The company entered the markets in Greece and Albania in 2008, the year in which Trenkwalder, with around 70,000 employees in 450 branches, generated more than 1 billion euros in sales.

The 2008 financial crisis led to 30,000 layoffs at the firm. Business picked up again from the second quarter of 2009, with the number of employees reaching 53,000 by the end of 2009. Revenue for the 2009 financial year amounted to 790 million euros. The company sought a financial investor in the following year and agreed on a comprehensive financing package with banks at the end of the year.

=== Since 2011 ===
The sought-after investor was found in 2011: Düsseldorf's Droege Group and Trenkwalder agreed just before Easter 2011 on the sale of more than 75 percent of the company's shares. At the end of 2010, Trenkwalder reported a workforce of 70,000 and sales of around 1 billion euros. The sale was completed in August 2011, following the due diligence process and approval by the competition authorities and supervisory boards.

Since 2012, the company has been transforming from a personnel leasing provider to a universal provider of all human resources (HR) services. This includes personnel planning, recruitment, consulting, and the takeover of HR tasks and processes.

In 2017, the company was renamed: Trenkwalder International AG became Trenkwalder Group AG.

== Business activities ==
The Staffing division primarily involves the temporary leasing and placement of employees. The HR Services division offers personnel-related services such as payroll processing or applicant management. As part of Personnel Consulting, Trenkwalder supports strategic personnel planning and labor market analyses for location selection, including regional labor market characteristics, labor availability, salary assessments, and total labor costs. Trenkwalder Learning offers a wide range of mobile training in self-study and Blended learning formats in more than 23 languages.

=== Partnerships ===
Wherever joint tasks are to be solved in the labor market, Trenkwalder cooperates with national labor market administrations. An example of this is the collaboration of the Austrian subsidiary with the Employment Service (AMS).

For years, Trenkwalder has cooperated with the Danube University Krems through its Austrian subsidiary: in 2008, the university course "Personnel Services Management" was established there. It was initially developed specifically for Trenkwalder employees. The program was an MBA course. A year later, the course was also offered to individuals who were not part of the Trenkwalder staff. The program continues to be offered in an updated form to this day (as of October 2019).

== Facts and figures ==
=== Customers ===
According to its own information, Trenkwalder works with more than 7,000 customers.

=== Locations, group, and partners ===
The Trenkwalder Group operates in 16 European countries: Austria, Germany, Switzerland, Liechtenstein, Bulgaria, Greece, Croatia, Poland, Slovakia, Slovenia, Romania, Czechia, Turkey, Hungary, Kosovo and Netherlands. Most of these are in the German-speaking region and CEE countries. The number of locations exceeds 200.

=== Ownership, management, and employees ===
According to the Austrian Broadcasting Corporation, 87.5 percent of the company is owned by the Droege Group, with 12.5 percent held by the Trenkwalder Private Foundation.

Since July 2020, Björn Schlosser has been the sole CEO. Ernest-W. Droege chairs the supervisory board.

In 2022, Mark Pollok was appointed as CEO of Trenkwalder Group AG. Before, Pollok was a member of the board of Trenkwalder Group AG, responsible for Germany, Austria, digitalization and customer experience business development. Since 2017, he held various management positions within Trenkwalder Group AG, and previously worked for the Droege Group AG, the parent company of Trenkwalder, since 2011.

More than 20 people work for the Trenkwalder Group.

== Perception ==
=== Sponsorship ===
Trenkwalder was a sponsor of TSV 1860 Munich, a member of the 2nd Bundesliga in Germany. In July 2006, the company initially joined as a presenter. The following year, Trenkwalder became the main sponsor. Due to the economic crisis, Trenkwalder did not renew the two-year contract.

In Austria, Richard Trenkwalder was involved as president of the club ASK Schwadorf since 2001. In mid-2008, after promotion to the First League of Austria, the club was named FC Trenkwalder Admira. From the 2011/2012 season, it played in the Austrian Football Bundesliga and in the 2012/2013 UEFA Europa League until the third qualifying round. The club's stadium was called the Trenkwalder-Arena from 2008 to 2013.

=== Awards ===
Trenkwalder has been honored multiple times as a company:

- Trenkwalder received the State Prize for Employment in 1996.
- Since 2007 the Austrian subsidiary has been a holder of the seal Investors in People. This quality seal has been confirmed in several recertifications since then. In 2016, Trenkwalder was the first company in Austria to receive the silver award.
- The “Entrepreneur of the Year Award”, an award for Austrian companies by Ernst & Young, went to Trenkwalder in 2007 in the Services and Commerce category.
- Wolfgang Clement honored Trenkwalder's German subsidiary in the “Top Job 2008” competition as one of the top 100 medium-sized employers.
- In 2010, Trenkwalder's German subsidiary participated in the “Germany's Best Employers” competition, and it was awarded at the beginning of 2011.
- The "Career’s Best Recruiter" award in gold and silver has been awarded multiple times to the Austrian and German subsidiaries since 2011.
- In 2012, the company was admitted to the “Leitbetriebe Austria” circle, which represents the top of the Austrian economy.
- In the BEST RECRUITERS Study 2022/2023, Trenkwalder was awarded the BEST RECRUITERS Silver Seal for its above-average recruiting performance.
- Trenkwalder was awarded the TOP COMPANY seal for the good feedback from employees on German-speaking KUNUNU platform.

== Board of directors ==
Mark Pollok is a German manager, graduated in industrial engineering from RWTH Aachen and current CEO of Trenkwalder Group AG. He joined Trenkwalder Group AG in 2017 and soon became Managing Director of the German Trenkwalder companies.
