= Jennings Franciskovic =

American volleyball player (born 1995)

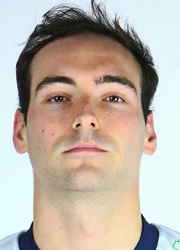

Personal information
- Nationality: (United States) American
- Born: May 10, 1995 (age 31); Chicago, IL, United States
- Height: 1.96 m (6 ft 5 in)
- Weight: 84 kg (185 lb)
- Spike: 366 cm (144 in)
- Block: 353 cm (139 in)
- Education: University of Hawaii at Manoa

Volleyball information
- Position: Setter

Career
Years	Teams
2013–2017; 2017–2019; 2019–2020	(United States) Hawaii Rainbow Warriors (Italy) Modena Volley (Italy) Calzedonia Verona

Jennings Franciskovic (born May 10, 1995) is an American volleyball player.

== Sporting achievements ==
- National championships
  - 2017/2018 Italian Championship, with Modena Volley
  - 2018/2019 Italian SuperCup, with Modena Volley
- National team
  - 2015 U21 Pan-American Cup
