= Luca Vettori =

Italian volleyball player (born 1991)

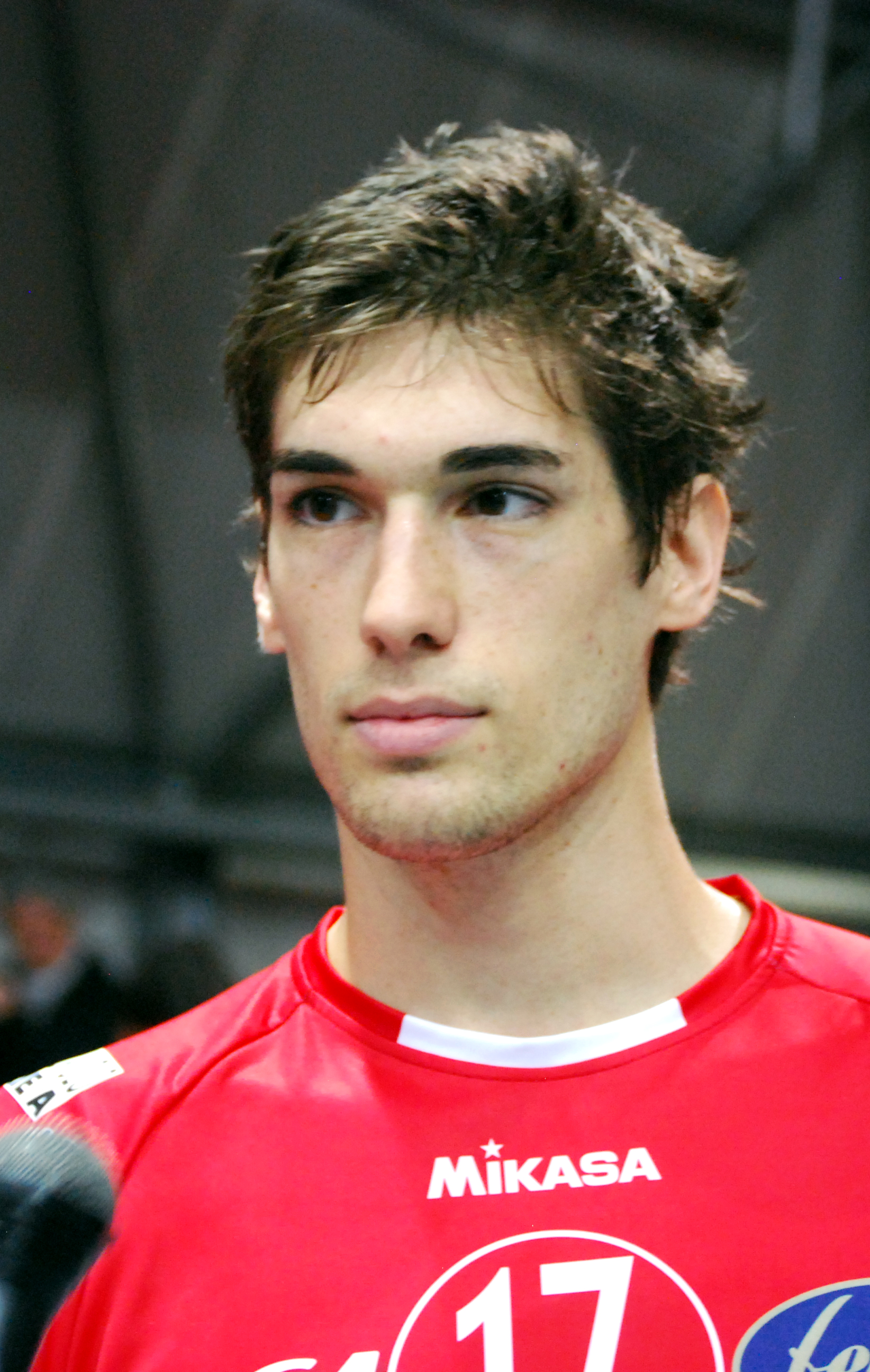
- Vettori playing for Italy in 2013

Personal information
- Born: 26 April 1991 (age 35); Parma, Italy
- Height: 2.02 m (6 ft 8 in)
- Weight: 94 kg (207 lb)
- Spike: 360 cm (142 in)
- Block: 338 cm (133 in)

Volleyball information
- Position: Opposite
- Current team: Azimut Modena
- Number: 7

Career
Years	Teams
2007–2009; 2009–2010; 2010–2012; 2012–2014; 2014–2017; 2017–2020; 2020–	Copra Elior Piacenza; Pallavolo Parma; Club Italia Roma; Copra Elior Piacenza; Azimut Modena; Diatec Trentino; Azimut Modena

National team
2012–	Italy
Honours
Men's volleyball
Representing Italy
Olympic Games
Olympic Games
Silver medal – second place	2016 Rio de Janeiro	Team
World Cup
Silver medal – second place	2015 Japan
World Grand Champions Cup
Silver medal – second place	2017 Japan
Bronze medal – third place	2013 Japan
World League
Bronze medal – third place	2013 Mar del Plata
Bronze medal – third place	2014 Florence
European Championship
Silver medal – second place	2013 Denmark/Poland
Bronze medal – third place	2015 Bulgaria/Italy

Luca Vettori (born 26 April 1991) is an Italian volleyball player, a member of Italy's men's national volleyball team and the Italian club Modena Volley. He was a silver medalist at the 2016 Summer Olympics and at the 2013 European Championship, and two times bronze medalist in the World League (2013, 2014). With Modena, he won the Italian title for clubs in 2015-2016.

== Career ==
=== National team ===
He debuted with the Italy men's national volleyball team in 2012. In 2013 Italy, including Vettori, won the bronze medal in the World League. In the same year he achieved the silver medal in European Championship. In 2014 he and his Italian teammates won the bronze in World League held in Florence, Italy. He was also part of the team that won the silver medal in the 2016 Summer Olympics and in the 2017 FIVB Volleyball Men's World Grand Champions Cup.

== Sporting achievements ==
=== Clubs ===
==== Club World Championship ====
- 2018, with Trentino Volley

==== CEV Challenge Cup ====
- 2012/2013, with Copra Elior Piacenza

==== National championships ====
- 2012/2013 Italian Championship, with Copra Elior Piacenza
- 2013/2014 Italian Cup, with Copra Elior Piacenza
- 2014/2015 Italian Cup, with Modena Volley
- 2015/2016 Italian Cup, with DHL Modena
- 2015/2016 Italian SuperCup, with DHL Modena
- 2015/2016 Italian Championship, with DHL Modena

=== National team ===
- 2013 FIVB World League
- 2013 CEV European Championship
- 2014 FIVB World League
- 2015 FIVB World Cup
- 2016 Olympic Games

=== Individual ===
- 2009 FIVB U19 World Championship - Best Scorer
- 2013 CEV European Championship - Best Spiker

Awards
Preceded by (Russia) Maxim Mikhaylov	Best Spiker of CEV European Championship; 2013	Succeeded by (Italy) Ivan Zaytsev
