= Salvatore Rossini =

Italian volleyball player (born 1986)

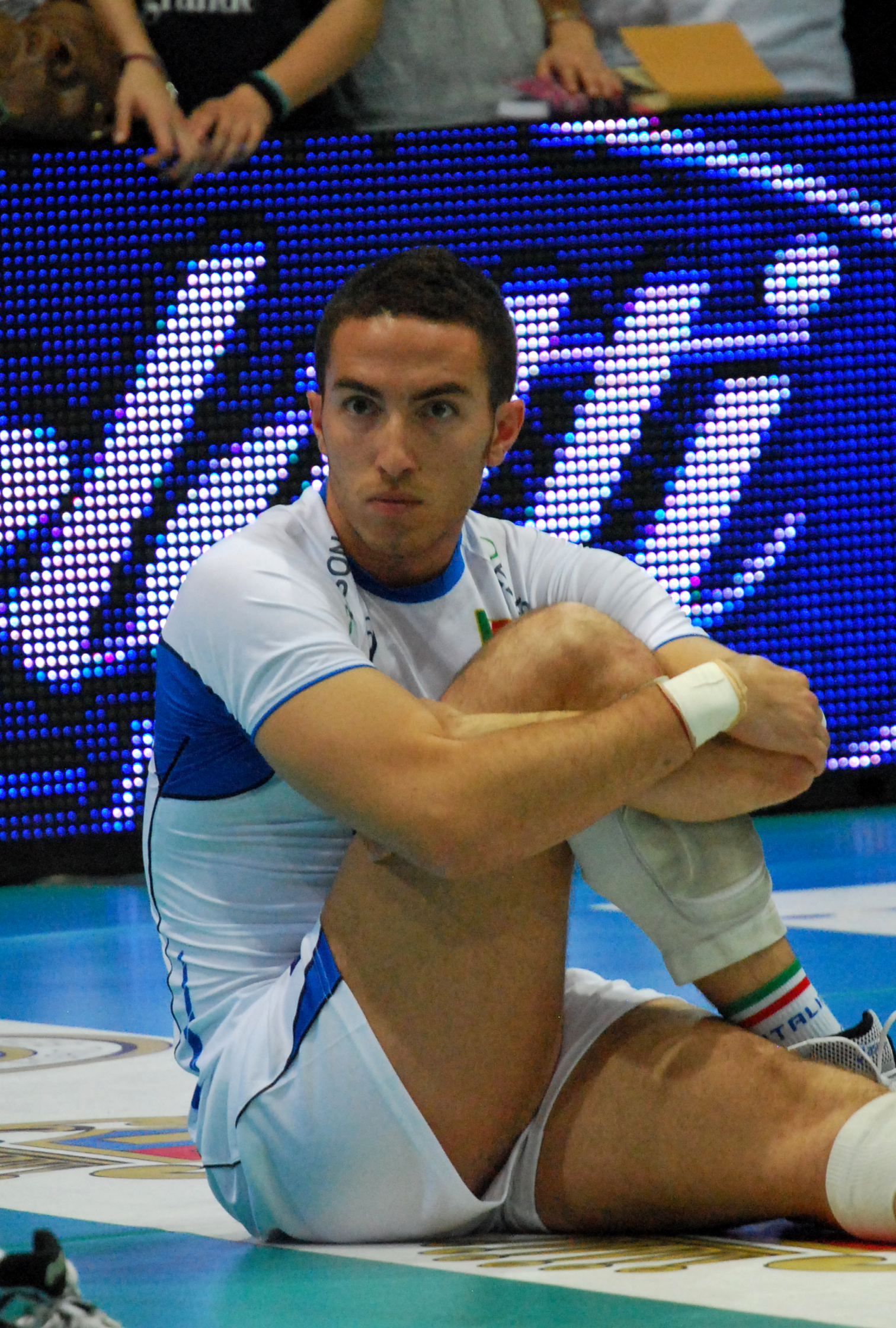

Personal information
- Born: 13 July 1986 (age 40); Formia, Italy
- Height: 1.85 m (6 ft 1 in)
- Weight: 82 kg (181 lb)
- Spike: 312 cm (123 in)
- Block: 301 cm (119 in)

Volleyball information
- Position: Libero
- Current club: Azimut Modena
- Number: 7

Career
| Years | Teams |
|---|---|
| 2003–2005; 2005–2006; 2006–2007; 2007–2009; 2009–2010; 2010–2011; 2011–2012; 2012–2014; 2014– | Latina Volley; Pallavolo Aversa; Pallavolo Catania; Argos Volley; Cortona Volley; Citta di Castello; Pallavolo Gabeca; Andreoli Latina; Azimut Modena |

National team
| 2012– | Italy |
Honours
Men's volleyball
Representing Italy
Olympic Games
Olympic Games
| Silver medal – second place | 2016 Rio de Janeiro | Team |
World Cup
| Silver medal – second place | 2015 Japan |
World Grand Champions Cup
| Bronze medal – third place | 2013 Japan |
World League
| Bronze medal – third place | 2013 Mar del Plata |
| Bronze medal – third place | 2014 Florence |
European Championship
| Silver medal – second place | 2013 Denmark/Poland |
| Bronze medal – third place | 2015 Bulgaria/Italy |
- Last updated: 26 December 2017

Salvatore Rossini (born 13 July 1986) is an Italian professional volleyball player, a member of the Italy men's national volleyball team and Italian club Azimut Modena. He was silver medalist of the 2016 Summer Olympics and of the 2015 World Cup, and medalist of the European Championship (silver in 2013, bronze in 2015).

== Career ==
=== National team ===
He debuted with the Italy men's national volleyball team in 2012. In 2013 Italy, including Rossini, won bronze medal of World League. In the same year he achieved silver medal of European Championship. In 2014, he and his Italian teammates won bronze of World League held in Florence, Italy. He was also part of the team that won the silver medal in the 2016 Summer Olympics and in the 2017 FIVB Volleyball Men's World Grand Champions Cup.

== Sporting achievements ==
=== Clubs ===
==== CEV Cup ====
- 2022–23 with Valsa Group Modena

==== National championships ====
- 2014/2015 Italian Cup, with Modena Volley
- 2015/2016 Italian SuperCup, with DHL Modena
- 2015/2016 Italian Cup, with DHL Modena
- 2015/2016 Italian Championship, with DHL Modena

=== National team ===
- 2013 FIVB World League
- 2013 CEV European Championship
- 2014 FIVB World League
- 2015 FIVB World Cup
- 2015 CEV European Championship
- 2016 Olympic Games

=== Individual ===
- 2014 FIVB World League – Best Libero
