= Giovanni Sanguinetti =

Italian volleyball player (born 2000)

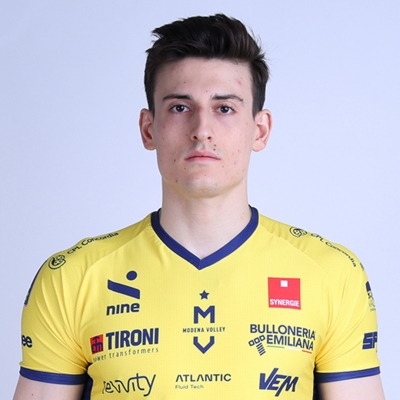

Personal information
- Nationality: Italian
- Born: 14 April 2000 (age 26)
- Height: 203 cm (6 ft 8 in)

National team
Italy
Honours
Men's volleyball
Representing Italy
European Championship
Silver medal – second place	2023 Italy/Bulgaria/North Macedonia/Israel

Giovanni Sanguinetti (born 14 April 2000) is an Italian volleyball player. He represented Italy at the 2024 Summer Olympics.
