= Luis Estrada (volleyball) =

Cuban volleyball player (born 2000)

Luis Elian Estrada Mazorra

Personal information
- Full name: Luis Elian Estrada Mazorra
- Nationality: Cuban
- Born: 10 March 2000 (age 26)
- Height: 205 cm (6 ft 9 in)
- Weight: 98 kg (216 lb)
- Spike: 370 cm (146 in)
- Block: 335 cm (132 in)

Volleyball information
- Position: Outside hitter
- Number: 22 (national team)

Career
Years	Teams
2015-2017	La Habana
2017-2019	Minas Tênis Clube
2019-2021	Modena Volley
2021-2022	Vôlei Funvic Natal
2022-2023	Itambé/Minas
2023-2024	VK Lvi Praha
2024	Jakarta STIN BIN
2024-2025	Suwon KEPCO Vixtorm
2025-2026	Shahdab Yazd
2026-	FHN-Xilasedici

National team
2015	Cuba

Luis Elian Estrada Mazorra (born 10 March 2000) is a Cuban male volleyball player. He is part of the Cuba men's national volleyball team. On club level he played in Azerbaijan for FHN-Xilasedici.
