= Pallavolo Molfetta =

Italian professional volleyball team

Exprivia Molfetta
- Full name: Exprivia Neldiritto Pallavolo Molfetta
- Founded: 1964
- Ground: PalaPoli (Capacity: 2,000)
- Chairman: Antonio Antonaci
- Manager: Flavio Gulineli
- Website: Club home page

Pallavolo Molfetta is a professional volleyball team based in Molfetta, Italy.

== History ==
In 2012 the club was promoted to Serie A1, highest level of the Italian Volleyball League. Same year Argentine Juan Manuel Cichello was a new head coach. In November 2016 Flavio Gulineli was a new head coach.

== Team ==
Team roster - season 2016/2017
Exprivia Molfetta
No.	Name	Date of birth	Position
1	(Italy) Alberto Polo	September 7, 1995	middle blocker
3	(Italy) Marco Vitelli	April 4, 1996	middle blocker
4	(Cuba) Ernesto Jiménez	November 16, 1989	outside hitter
5	(Italy) Pier Paolo Partenio	February 6, 1993	setter
6	(Italy) Francesco Del Vecchio	April 21, 1987	outside hitter
7	(Brazil) Joao Rafael De Barros Ferreira	March 17, 1993	outside hitter
8	(Brazil) Thiago Pontes Veloso	August 15, 1993	setter
9	(Romania) Bogdan Olteanu	May 11, 1981	outside hitter
10	(Italy) Giulio Sabbi	August 10, 1989	opposite
11	(Italy) Daniele De Pandis	June 30, 1984	libero
12	(Italy) Alessandro Porcelli	December 3, 1995	libero
13	(Italy) Niki Hendriks	September 6, 1992	outside hitter
14	(Slovenia) Gregor Ropret^{2}	March 1, 1989	setter
15	(Italy) Elio Giuseppe Cormio	June 15, 1998	outside hitter
17	(Brazil) Maicon Josè Leite Costa^{3}	May 6, 1992	middle blocker
18	(Italy) Gabriele Di Martino^{4}	July 20, 1997	middle blocker
Head coach: Flavio Gulineli; Assistant: Leonardo Castellaneta^{1} Ernesto Jimenez joined the club on October 14, 2016.^{2} Maicon Jose Leite Costa joined the club on December 10, 2016.^{3} Gabriele DI Martino left the club on December 10, 2016.^{4} Gregor Ropret was a player of the club from September 30, 2016, to October 23, 2016.
