= 2019 FIVB Men's Volleyball Nations League squads =

This article shows the roster of all participating teams at the 2019 FIVB Volleyball Men's Nations League. The 16 national teams involved in the tournament each registered a squad of at least 21 players, from which every week's 14-player roster was selected. Each country must declare its 14-player roster two days before the start of each week's round-robin competition.

== Argentina ==
The following is the Argentina roster in the 2019 Men's Nations League.

Head coach: Julio Velasco

Selected to 14-man squad during preliminary round

No.	Name	Date of birth	Height	Weight	Spike	Block	2019-20 club
2	Federico Pereyra	19 June 1988	2.02 m (6 ft 8 in)	99 kg (218 lb)	335 cm (132 in)	325 cm (128 in)	(Argentina) Monteros Voley
3	Jan Martínez Franchi	28 January 1998	1.90 m (6 ft 3 in)	85 kg (187 lb)	333 cm (131 in)	316 cm (124 in)	(Belgium) Greenyard Maaseik
4	Maximiliano Cavanna	2 July 1988	1.88 m (6 ft 2 in)	81 kg (179 lb)	333 cm (131 in)	312 cm (123 in)	(Argentina) UPCN San Juan
5	Nicolás Uriarte	21 March 1990	1.92 m (6 ft 4 in)	82 kg (181 lb)	346 cm (136 in)	326 cm (128 in)	(Brazil) Funvic Taubaté
6	Cristian Poglajen	14 July 1989	1.95 m (6 ft 5 in)	94 kg (207 lb)	342 cm (135 in)	322 cm (127 in)	(Brazil) Montes Claros
7	Facundo Conte	25 August 1989	1.97 m (6 ft 6 in)	88 kg (194 lb)	354 cm (139 in)	334 cm (131 in)	(China) Shanghai
8	Agustín Loser	12 October 1997	1.93 m (6 ft 4 in)	77 kg (170 lb)	335 cm (132 in)	310 cm (120 in)	(Argentina) Buenos Aires
9	Santiago Danani	12 December 1995	1.76 m (5 ft 9 in)	77 kg (170 lb)	324 cm (128 in)	309 cm (122 in)	(Argentina) Club de Amigos
10	Nicolás Bruno	24 February 1989	1.87 m (6 ft 2 in)	85 kg (187 lb)	338 cm (133 in)	318 cm (125 in)	(Argentina) Personal Bolívar
11	Sebastián Solé	12 June 1991	2.00 m (6 ft 7 in)	94 kg (207 lb)	362 cm (143 in)	342 cm (135 in)	(Brazil) Taubaté
12	Bruno Lima	4 February 1996	1.98 m (6 ft 6 in)	87 kg (192 lb)	345 cm (136 in)	320 cm (130 in)	(Argentina) Bolívar
13	Ezequiel Palacios	2 October 1992	1.98 m (6 ft 6 in)	95 kg (209 lb)	345 cm (136 in)	325 cm (128 in)	(Argentina) La Unión de Formosa
14	Pablo Crer	12 June 1989	2.02 m (6 ft 8 in)	85 kg (187 lb)	357 cm (141 in)	337 cm (133 in)	(Argentina) Bolívar
15	Luciano De Cecco (c)	2 June 1988	1.91 m (6 ft 3 in)	98 kg (216 lb)	332 cm (131 in)	315 cm (124 in)	(Italy) Perugia
16	Alexis González	21 July 1981	1.84 m (6 ft 0 in)	85 kg (187 lb)	327 cm (129 in)	310 cm (120 in)	(Argentina) Personal Bolívar
17	Nicolas Mendez	2 November 1992	1.91 m (6 ft 3 in)	90 kg (200 lb)	340 cm (130 in)	326 cm (128 in)	(Argentina) Gazélec Ajaccio
18	Martín Ramos	26 August 1991	1.97 m (6 ft 6 in)	94 kg (207 lb)	348 cm (137 in)	328 cm (129 in)	(Argentina) UPCN San Juan
19	Franco Massimino	23 May 1988	1.77 m (5 ft 10 in)	66 kg (146 lb)	310 cm (120 in)	297 cm (117 in)	(Argentina) Lomas
22	Lisandro Zanotti	4 October 1990	1.95 m (6 ft 5 in)	88 kg (194 lb)	336 cm (132 in)	315 cm (124 in)	(Argentina) Lomas
23	Joaquin Gallego	21 November 1996	2.04 m (6 ft 8 in)	102 kg (225 lb)	343 cm (135 in)	323 cm (127 in)	(Argentina) Bolívar
24	Germán Johansen	2 September 1995	2.00 m (6 ft 7 in)	85 kg (187 lb)	351 cm (138 in)	336 cm (132 in)	(Argentina) Club de Amigos
25	Nicolás Lazo	16 April 1995	1.92 m (6 ft 4 in)	85 kg (187 lb)	340 cm (130 in)	320 cm (130 in)	(Argentina) UPCN San Juan
27	Matías Giraudo	18 March 1998	1.96 m (6 ft 5 in)	85 kg (187 lb)	330 cm (130 in)	315 cm (124 in)	(Argentina) Bolívar
29	Luciano Palonsky	8 July 1999	1.98 m (6 ft 6 in)	72 kg (159 lb)	330 cm (130 in)	310 cm (120 in)	(Argentina) Buenos Aires
30	Gastón Fernández	4 August 1995	2.03 m (6 ft 8 in)	101 kg (223 lb)	339 cm (133 in)	317 cm (125 in)	(Argentina) Buenos Aires

== Australia ==
The following is the Australia roster in the 2019 Men's Nations League.

Head coach: Mark Lebedew

Selected to 14-man squad during preliminary round

No.	Name	Date of birth	Height	Weight	Spike	Block	2019-20 club
1	Beau Graham	17 April 1994	2.02 m (6 ft 8 in)	86 kg (190 lb)	351 cm (138 in)	332 cm (131 in)	(France) Gazélec Ajaccio
2	Arshdeep Dosanjh	30 July 1996	2.05 m (6 ft 9 in)	85 kg (187 lb)	347 cm (137 in)	335 cm (132 in)	(France) Grand Nancy
3	Steven Macdonald	26 June 1997	2.07 m (6 ft 9 in)	85 kg (187 lb)	351 cm (138 in)	342 cm (135 in)	(Australia) Queensland Academy of Sport
4	Paul Sanderson	7 January 1986	1.95 m (6 ft 5 in)	94 kg (207 lb)	348 cm (137 in)	335 cm (132 in)	(Australia) Australian Institute of Sport
5	Travis Passier	26 April 1989	2.08 m (6 ft 10 in)	100 kg (220 lb)	355 cm (140 in)	340 cm (130 in)	(Australia) Australian Institute of Sport
6	Thomas Edgar	21 June 1989	2.12 m (6 ft 11 in)	106 kg (234 lb)	357 cm (141 in)	341 cm (134 in)	(Japan) JT Thunders
7	Harrison Peacock	31 January 1991	1.92 m (6 ft 4 in)	87 kg (192 lb)	353 cm (139 in)	339 cm (133 in)	(Australia) Adelaide Storm
8	Trent O'Dea	11 May 1994	2.01 m (6 ft 7 in)	98 kg (216 lb)	354 cm (139 in)	344 cm (135 in)	(Australia) AVA
9	Max Staples	27 July 1994	1.94 m (6 ft 4 in)	83 kg (183 lb)	358 cm (141 in)	345 cm (136 in)	(Germany) HYPO TIROL Alpenvolleys
10	Jordan Richards	25 September 1993	1.93 m (6 ft 4 in)	80 kg (180 lb)	354 cm (139 in)	342 cm (135 in)	(Germany) HYPO TIROL Alpenvolleys
11	Luke Perry	20 November 1995	1.80 m (5 ft 11 in)	75 kg (165 lb)	331 cm (130 in)	315 cm (124 in)	(France) Tours VB
12	Nehemiah Mote	21 June 1993	2.04 m (6 ft 8 in)	91 kg (201 lb)	362 cm (143 in)	354 cm (139 in)	(Germany) VfB Friedrichshafen
13	Samuel Walker	19 February 1995	2.08 m (6 ft 10 in)	90 kg (200 lb)	350 cm (140 in)	337 cm (133 in)	Qatar SC
15	Luke Smith	30 August 1990	2.04 m (6 ft 8 in)	95 kg (209 lb)	360 cm (140 in)	342 cm (135 in)	(Czech Republic) VK Lvi Praha
16	Thomas Douglas-Powell	16 September 1992	1.94 m (6 ft 4 in)	82 kg (181 lb)	356 cm (140 in)	332 cm (131 in)	(Netherlands) Lycurgus
17	Paul Carroll (C)	16 May 1986	2.07 m (6 ft 9 in)	100 kg (220 lb)	354 cm (139 in)	340 cm (130 in)	(Russia) Yenisey Krasnoyarsk
18	Lincoln Williams	6 October 1993	2.00 m (6 ft 7 in)	104 kg (229 lb)	353 cm (139 in)	330 cm (130 in)	(France) AS Cannes VB
19	Malachi Murch	4 January 1995	1.97 m (6 ft 6 in)	75 kg (165 lb)	341 cm (134 in)	335 cm (132 in)	(Denmark) Nordenskov UIF
21	Nicholas Butler	27 June 1997	1.98 m (6 ft 6 in)	95 kg (209 lb)	345 cm (136 in)	333 cm (131 in)	(Australia) AVA
22	Curtis Stockton	22 April 1993	1.98 m (6 ft 6 in)	94 kg (207 lb)	351 cm (138 in)	330 cm (130 in)	(Estonia) Tartu
23	James Weir	20 July 1995	2.04 m (6 ft 8 in)	95 kg (209 lb)	348 cm (137 in)	342 cm (135 in)	(Germany) Netzhoppers
24	Elliott Viles	1 May 1997	1.93 m (6 ft 4 in)	73 kg (161 lb)	360 cm (140 in)	340 cm (130 in)	(Canada) Brandon University
25	Jordan Colotti	7 May 1996	1.88 m (6 ft 2 in)	82 kg (181 lb)	335 cm (132 in)	325 cm (128 in)	(Denmark) Nordenskov UIF
26	Caleb Watson	28 June 1993	2 m (6 ft 7 in)	92 kg (203 lb)	344 cm (135 in)	338 cm (133 in)	(Sweden) Lunds VK
30	Conal Tain Mcainsh	12 May 1997	2.01 m (6 ft 7 in)	95 kg (209 lb)	339 cm (133 in)	332 cm (131 in)	(North Macedonia) Skopje

== Brazil ==
The following is the Brazil roster in the 2019 Men's Nations League.

Head coach: Renan Dal Zotto

Selected to 14-man squad during preliminary round
Selected for Final Six 14-man squad

No.	Name	Date of birth	Height	Weight	Spike	Block	2019-20 club
1	Bruno Rezende (c)	2 July 1986	1.90 m (6 ft 3 in)	76 kg (168 lb)	323 cm (127 in)	302 cm (119 in)	(Italy) Lube Civitanova
2	Isac Santos	13 December 1990	2.08 m (6 ft 10 in)	99 kg (218 lb)	339 cm (133 in)	306 cm (120 in)	(Brazil) Sada Cruzeiro
3	Éder Carbonera	19 October 1983	2.05 m (6 ft 9 in)	107 kg (236 lb)	360 cm (140 in)	330 cm (130 in)	(Brazil) SESI-SP
4	Thales Hoss	26 April 1989	1.90 m (6 ft 3 in)	74 kg (163 lb)	320 cm (130 in)	303 cm (119 in)	(Brazil) Funvic Taubaté
5	Lucas Lóh	18 January 1991	1.95 m (6 ft 5 in)	83 kg (183 lb)	336 cm (132 in)	320 cm (130 in)	(Brazil) SESI-SP
6	Fernando Kreling	13 January 1996	1.85 m (6 ft 1 in)	85 kg (187 lb)	319 cm (126 in)	301 cm (119 in)	(Brazil) Sada Cruzeiro
7	William Arjona	31 July 1979	1.86 m (6 ft 1 in)	78 kg (172 lb)	300 cm (120 in)	295 cm (116 in)	(Brazil) SESI-SP
8	Wallace de Souza	26 June 1987	1.98 m (6 ft 6 in)	87 kg (192 lb)	344 cm (135 in)	318 cm (125 in)	(Brazil) SESC-RJ
9	Yoandy Leal	31 August 1988	2.02 m (6 ft 8 in)	107 kg (236 lb)	361 cm (142 in)	348 cm (137 in)	(Italy) Lube Civitanova
11	Rodrigo Leão	5 June 1996	1.97 m (6 ft 6 in)	85 kg (187 lb)	331 cm (130 in)	316 cm (124 in)	(Brazil) Sada Cruzeiro
12	Raphael de Oliveira	14 June 1979	1.90 m (6 ft 3 in)	82 kg (181 lb)	330 cm (130 in)	306 cm (120 in)	(Brazil) Funvic Taubaté
13	Maurício Souza	29 September 1988	2.09 m (6 ft 10 in)	93 kg (205 lb)	344 cm (135 in)	323 cm (127 in)	(Brazil) SESC-RJ
14	Douglas Souza	20 August 1995	1.99 m (6 ft 6 in)	75 kg (165 lb)	338 cm (133 in)	317 cm (125 in)	(Brazil) Funvic Taubaté
15	Carlos Eduardo Silva	8 August 1994	2.00 m (6 ft 7 in)	90 kg (200 lb)	348 cm (137 in)	340 cm (130 in)	(Italy) Vibo Valentia
16	Lucas Saatkamp (C)	6 March 1986	2.09 m (6 ft 10 in)	101 kg (223 lb)	340 cm (130 in)	321 cm (126 in)	(Brazil) Funvic Taubaté
17	Evandro Guerra	27 December 1981	2.07 m (6 ft 9 in)	106 kg (234 lb)	359 cm (141 in)	332 cm (131 in)	(Brazil) Sada Cruzeiro
18	Ricardo Lucarelli Souza	14 February 1992	1.96 m (6 ft 5 in)	87 kg (192 lb)	348 cm (137 in)	326 cm (128 in)	(Brazil) Funvic Taubaté
19	Maurício Borges Silva	4 February 1989	1.99 m (6 ft 6 in)	99 kg (218 lb)	335 cm (132 in)	315 cm (124 in)	(Brazil) SESC-RJ
20	Thiago Veloso	15 August 1993	1.84 m (6 ft 0 in)	77 kg (170 lb)	305 cm (120 in)	298 cm (117 in)	(Brazil) SESC-RJ
21	Alan Souza	21 March 1994	2.02 m (6 ft 8 in)	98 kg (216 lb)	336 cm (132 in)	320 cm (130 in)	(Brazil) SESI-SP
22	Maique Nascimento	16 July 1997	1.82 m (6 ft 0 in)	76 kg (168 lb)	310 cm (120 in)	255 cm (100 in)	(Brazil) Minas Tênis Clube
23	Flávio Gualberto	22 April 1993	1.99 m (6 ft 6 in)	84 kg (185 lb)	356 cm (140 in)	329 cm (130 in)	(Brazil) Minas Tênis Clube
24	Douglas Pureza	16 November 1996	1.78 m (5 ft 10 in)	70 kg (150 lb)	302 cm (119 in)	283 cm (111 in)	(Brazil) SESI-SP
27	Henrique Honorato	18 March 1997	1.90 m (6 ft 3 in)	85 kg (187 lb)	335 cm (132 in)	310 cm (120 in)	(Brazil) Minas Tênis Clube
29	Rafael Araújo	13 June 1991	2.06 m (6 ft 9 in)	93 kg (205 lb)	348 cm (137 in)	325 cm (128 in)	(Poland) Onico Warszawa

== Bulgaria ==
The following is the Bulgaria roster in the 2019 Men's VNL.

Head coach: Silvano Prandi

Selected to 14-man squad during preliminary round

No.	Name	Date of birth	Height	Weight	Spike	Block	2019-20 club
1	Georgi Bratoev	21 October 1987	2.03 m (6 ft 8 in)	98 kg (216 lb)	340 cm (130 in)	325 cm (128 in)	(Bulgaria) Neftochimik
2	Krasimir Georgiev	13 February 1995	2.05 m (6 ft 9 in)	95 kg (209 lb)	368 cm (145 in)	342 cm (135 in)	(Bulgaria) CSKA Sofia
3	Chono Penchev	11 December 1994	1.97 m (6 ft 6 in)	78 kg (172 lb)	318 cm (125 in)	307 cm (121 in)	(Bulgaria) Pirin Razlog
4	Martin Atanasov	27 September 1996	1.98 m (6 ft 6 in)	80 kg (180 lb)	358 cm (141 in)	335 cm (132 in)	(Turkey) Ziraat Bank
5	Svetoslav Gotsev	31 August 1990	2.05 m (6 ft 9 in)	97 kg (214 lb)	358 cm (141 in)	335 cm (132 in)	(Bulgaria) Levski Sofia
6	Rozalin Penchev	11 December 1994	1.97 m (6 ft 6 in)	79 kg (174 lb)	337 cm (133 in)	327 cm (129 in)	(Brazil) Sesc Rio
7	Nikolay Uchikov	13 April 1986	2.07 m (6 ft 9 in)	110 kg (240 lb)	355 cm (140 in)	330 cm (130 in)	(Bulgaria) Neftochimik
8	Todor Skrimov	9 January 1990	1.91 m (6 ft 3 in)	87 kg (192 lb)	348 cm (137 in)	330 cm (130 in)	(Russia) Yenisey Krasnoyarsk
9	Georgi Seganov	10 June 1993	1.98 m (6 ft 6 in)	83 kg (183 lb)	338 cm (133 in)	325 cm (128 in)	(Turkey) Cizre BLD
10	Valentin Bratoev	21 October 1987	2.03 m (6 ft 8 in)	92 kg (203 lb)	347 cm (137 in)	337 cm (133 in)	(Japan) JTEKT Stings
11	Velizar Chernokozhev	23 April 1995	2.12 m (6 ft 11 in)	108 kg (238 lb)	350 cm (140 in)	335 cm (132 in)	(Bulgaria) Dobrudzha 07
12	Viktor Yosifov (C)	16 October 1985	2.04 m (6 ft 8 in)	100 kg (220 lb)	350 cm (140 in)	340 cm (130 in)	(Italy) Vero Volley Monza
13	Teodor Salparov	16 August 1982	1.87 m (6 ft 2 in)	77 kg (170 lb)	320 cm (130 in)	305 cm (120 in)	(Bulgaria) Neftochimik
14	Teodor Todorov	1 September 1989	2.08 m (6 ft 10 in)	108 kg (238 lb)	365 cm (144 in)	345 cm (136 in)	(Bulgaria) Neftochimik
16	Vladislav Ivanov	14 March 1987	1.88 m (6 ft 2 in)	80 kg (180 lb)	320 cm (130 in)	310 cm (120 in)	(Bulgaria) Levski Sofia
17	Nikolay Penchev	22 May 1992	1.97 m (6 ft 6 in)	87 kg (192 lb)	341 cm (134 in)	335 cm (132 in)	(Poland) ONICO Warsaw
18	Nikolay Nikolov	29 July 1986	2.06 m (6 ft 9 in)	97 kg (214 lb)	350 cm (140 in)	332 cm (131 in)	(Portugal) Sporting CP
19	Tsvetan Sokolov	31 December 1989	2.06 m (6 ft 9 in)	110 kg (240 lb)	365 cm (144 in)	350 cm (140 in)	(Russia) VC Dynamo Moscow
20	Aleks Grozdanov	28 March 1998	2.08 m (6 ft 10 in)	90 kg (200 lb)	357 cm (141 in)	334 cm (131 in)	(Italy) Ravenna
21	Petar Karakashev	11 February 1991	1.84 m (6 ft 0 in)	74 kg (163 lb)	326 cm (128 in)	308 cm (121 in)	(Bulgaria) VC Hebar
22	Vladimir Stankov	9 August 1996	1.9 m (6 ft 3 in)	82 kg (181 lb)	336 cm (132 in)	320 cm (130 in)	(Bulgaria) Levski Sofia
23	Martin Ivanov	4 February 1992	1.9 m (6 ft 3 in)	78 kg (172 lb)	320 cm (130 in)	310 cm (120 in)	(Bulgaria) Lokomotiv Plovdiv
25	Radoslav Parapunov	19 June 1997	2.05 m (6 ft 9 in)	87 kg (192 lb)	346 cm (136 in)	327 cm (129 in)	(Serbia) OK Vojvodina
26	Plamen Shekerdzhiev	21 May 1998	1.98 m (6 ft 6 in)	83 kg (183 lb)	345 cm (136 in)	328 cm (129 in)	(Bulgaria) CSKA Sofia
30	Nikolay Kolev	16 December 1997	2.04 m (6 ft 8 in)	86 kg (190 lb)	355 cm (140 in)	340 cm (130 in)	(Bulgaria) Neftochimik

== Canada ==
The following is the Canada roster in the 2019 Men's Nations League.

Head coach: Glenn Hoag

Selected to 14-man squad during preliminary round

No.	Name	Date of birth	Height	Weight	Spike	Block	2019-20 club
1	TJ Sanders	14 December 1991	1.91 m (6 ft 3 in)	81 kg (179 lb)	326 cm (128 in)	308 cm (121 in)	(Canada) Free Agent
2	John Gordon Perrin (C)	17 August 1989	2.01 m (6 ft 7 in)	95 kg (209 lb)	353 cm (139 in)	329 cm (130 in)	(Russia) Ural Ufa
3	Steven Marshall	23 November 1989	1.93 m (6 ft 4 in)	87 kg (192 lb)	350 cm (140 in)	322 cm (127 in)	(Greece) P.A.O.K. V.C.
4	Nicholas Hoag	19 August 1992	2 m (6 ft 7 in)	91 kg (201 lb)	342 cm (135 in)	322 cm (127 in)	(Poland) Asseco Resovia
5	Daenan Gyimah	16 January 1998	1.99 m (6 ft 6 in)	75 kg (165 lb)	372 cm (146 in)	339 cm (133 in)	(United States) UCLA Bruins
6	Justin Duff	10 May 1988	2 m (6 ft 7 in)	102 kg (225 lb)	370 cm (150 in)	335 cm (132 in)	(Turkey) Galatasaray
7	Stephen Maar	6 December 1994	2.01 m (6 ft 7 in)	103 kg (227 lb)	350 cm (140 in)	328 cm (129 in)	(Russia) Dynamo Moscow
8	Jay Blankenau	27 September 1989	1.94 m (6 ft 4 in)	94 kg (207 lb)	334 cm (131 in)	307 cm (121 in)	(Turkey) Arkas Spor
9	Jason Derocco	19 September 1989	1.98 m (6 ft 6 in)	94 kg (207 lb)	342 cm (135 in)	318 cm (125 in)	(Egypt) Al Ahly
10	Sharone Vernon-Evans	28 August 1998	2.02 m (6 ft 8 in)	94 kg (207 lb)	374 cm (147 in)	347 cm (137 in)	(Italy) Ravenna
11	Daniel Jansen Van Doorn	21 March 1990	2.07 m (6 ft 9 in)	98 kg (216 lb)	351 cm (138 in)	328 cm (129 in)	(Belgium) Knack Roeselare
12	Lucas Van Berkel	29 November 1991	2.1 m (6 ft 11 in)	108 kg (238 lb)	350 cm (140 in)	326 cm (128 in)	(Turkey) Galatasaray
14	Eric Loeppky	1 August 1998	1.97 m (6 ft 6 in)	89 kg (196 lb)	348 cm (137 in)	325 cm (128 in)	(Canada) TWU Spartans
15	Jeremy Davies	1 May 1994	1.72 m (5 ft 8 in)	72 kg (159 lb)	299 cm (118 in)	283 cm (111 in)	(Finland) Team Lakkapä
16	Ryan Sclater	10 February 1994	2 m (6 ft 7 in)	92 kg (203 lb)	347 cm (137 in)	320 cm (130 in)	(France) Montpellier Volley
17	Graham Vigrass	17 June 1989	2.05 m (6 ft 9 in)	97 kg (214 lb)	354 cm (139 in)	330 cm (130 in)	(Poland) Jastrzębski Węgiel
19	Blair Bann	26 February 1988	1.84 m (6 ft 0 in)	84 kg (185 lb)	314 cm (124 in)	295 cm (116 in)	(Germany) SWD Powervolleys Düren
20	Arthur Szwarc	30 March 1995	2.09 m (6 ft 10 in)	99 kg (218 lb)	356 cm (140 in)	335 cm (132 in)	(Italy) Top Volley Latina
21	Brett Walsh	19 February 1994	1.95 m (6 ft 5 in)	84 kg (185 lb)	332 cm (131 in)	313 cm (123 in)	(Belgium) Knack Roeselare
22	Blake Scheerhoorn	6 January 1995	2.02 m (6 ft 8 in)	90 kg (200 lb)	359 cm (141 in)	342 cm (135 in)	(Germany) SVG Lüneburg
23	Danny Demyanenko	13 July 1994	1.94 m (6 ft 4 in)	101 kg (223 lb)	357 cm (141 in)	325 cm (128 in)	(France) Toulouse Volley
24	Adam Schriemer	17 August 1995	2 m (6 ft 7 in)	89 kg (196 lb)	350 cm (140 in)	328 cm (129 in)	(Germany) SVG Lüneburg
25	Brandon Koppers	9 September 1995	2 m (6 ft 7 in)	90 kg (200 lb)	345 cm (136 in)	331 cm (130 in)	(France) Tourcoing Volley
26	Derek Epp	15 June 1998	1.96 m (6 ft 5 in)	88 kg (194 lb)	335 cm (132 in)	315 cm (124 in)	(Canada) TWU Spartans
27	Casey Schouten	29 March 1994	1.94 m (6 ft 4 in)	95 kg (209 lb)	341 cm (134 in)	311 cm (122 in)	(Germany) Netzhoppers

== China ==
The following is the China roster in the 2019 Men's Nations League.

Head coach: Raúl Lozano

Selected to 14-man squad during preliminary round

No.	Name	Date of birth	Height	Weight	Spike	Block	2019-20 club
1	Dai Qingyao	26 September 1991	2.08 m (6 ft 10 in)	81 kg (179 lb)	350 cm (140 in)	340 cm (130 in)	(China) Shanghai
2	Jiang Chuan	9 August 1994	2.05 m (6 ft 9 in)	91 kg (201 lb)	365 cm (144 in)	345 cm (136 in)	(China) Beijing
3	Mao Tianyi	2 June 1993	2 m (6 ft 7 in)	90 kg (200 lb)	350 cm (140 in)	340 cm (130 in)	(China) Bayi
4	Xiu Chengcheng	23 August 1999	1.97 m (6 ft 6 in)	70 kg (150 lb)	365 cm (144 in)	348 cm (137 in)	(China) Bayi
5	Zhang Binglong	11 September 1994	1.97 m (6 ft 6 in)	99 kg (218 lb)	355 cm (140 in)	345 cm (136 in)	(China) Beijing
6	Li Runming	1 March 1990	1.98 m (6 ft 6 in)	90 kg (200 lb)	355 cm (140 in)	345 cm (136 in)	(China) Shandong
7	Zhang Jingyin	20 December 1999	2.07 m (6 ft 9 in)	88 kg (194 lb)	357 cm (141 in)	325 cm (128 in)	(China) Zhejiang
8	Wang Jingyi	7 February 1998	2.02 m (6 ft 8 in)	87 kg (192 lb)	360 cm (140 in)	350 cm (140 in)	(China) Shandong
9	Yu Yaochen	19 August 1995	1.95 m (6 ft 5 in)	89 kg (196 lb)	347 cm (137 in)	338 cm (133 in)	(China) Jiangsu
10	Ji Daoshuai (C)	7 February 1992	1.94 m (6 ft 4 in)	82 kg (181 lb)	355 cm (140 in)	335 cm (132 in)	(China) Shandong
11	Du Haixiang	25 May 1995	1.94 m (6 ft 4 in)	87 kg (192 lb)	348 cm (137 in)	336 cm (132 in)	(China) Sichuan
12	Zhang Zhejia	31 August 1995	2.07 m (6 ft 9 in)	95 kg (209 lb)	365 cm (144 in)	355 cm (140 in)	(China) Shanghai
13	Chen Longhai	29 March 1991	2 m (6 ft 7 in)	85 kg (187 lb)	350 cm (140 in)	340 cm (130 in)	(China) Shanghai
15	Tang Chuanhang	4 October 1995	2.02 m (6 ft 8 in)	92 kg (203 lb)	350 cm (140 in)	340 cm (130 in)	(China) Bayi
16	Tong Jiahua	13 December 1992	1.8 m (5 ft 11 in)	76 kg (168 lb)	330 cm (130 in)	320 cm (130 in)	(China) Shanghai
17	Liu Libin	16 February 1995	1.97 m (6 ft 6 in)	90 kg (200 lb)	350 cm (140 in)	342 cm (135 in)	(China) Beijing
18	Guo Shunxiang	3 November 1997	1.95 m (6 ft 5 in)	91 kg (201 lb)	349 cm (137 in)	335 cm (132 in)	(China) Sichuan
19	Zhan Guojun	16 December 1988	1.97 m (6 ft 6 in)	85 kg (187 lb)	350 cm (140 in)	340 cm (130 in)	(China) Shanghai
20	Rao Shuhan	23 December 1996	2.05 m (6 ft 9 in)	99 kg (218 lb)	360 cm (140 in)	350 cm (140 in)	(China) Fujian
21	Miao Ruantong	21 May 1995	2.05 m (6 ft 9 in)	88 kg (194 lb)	354 cm (139 in)	345 cm (136 in)	(China) Hubei
23	Peng Shikun	26 August 2000	2.08 m (6 ft 10 in)	90 kg (200 lb)	340 cm (130 in)	330 cm (130 in)	(China) Sichuan
24	Zhang Zuyuan	4 May 1997	2.07 m (6 ft 9 in)	87 kg (192 lb)	355 cm (140 in)	350 cm (140 in)	(China) Shandong
25	Chen Jiajie	17 September 1995	1.7 m (5 ft 7 in)	70 kg (150 lb)	325 cm (128 in)	310 cm (120 in)	(China) Guangdong
27	Ma Xiaoteng	19 June 1991	1.8 m (5 ft 11 in)	75 kg (165 lb)	330 cm (130 in)	320 cm (130 in)	(China) Bayi
28	Yuan Dangyi	30 November 1996	2 m (6 ft 7 in)	91 kg (201 lb)	355 cm (140 in)	343 cm (135 in)	(China) Tianjin

== France ==
The following is the France roster in the 2019 Men's Nations League.

Head coach: Laurent Tillie

Selected to 14-man squad during preliminary round
Selected for Final Six 14-man squad

No.	Name	Date of birth	Height	Weight	Spike	Block	2019-20 club
1	Jonas Aguenier	28 April 1992	2.02 m (6 ft 8 in)	92 kg (203 lb)	340 cm (130 in)	310 cm (120 in)	(France) Monini Spoleto
2	Jenia Grebennikov	13 August 1990	1.88 m (6 ft 2 in)	85 kg (187 lb)	345 cm (136 in)	330 cm (130 in)	(Italy) Trentino Volley
3	Luka Bašič	29 January 1995	2.01 m (6 ft 7 in)	77 kg (170 lb)	330 cm (130 in)	302 cm (119 in)	(Italy) Revivre Axipower Milano
4	Jean Patry	27 December 1996	2.07 m (6 ft 9 in)	94 kg (207 lb)	357 cm (141 in)	334 cm (131 in)	(France) Montpellier
5	Raphaël Corre	21 November 1989	1.96 m (6 ft 5 in)	85 kg (187 lb)	335 cm (132 in)	315 cm (124 in)	(France) Cannes
6	Benjamin Toniutti	30 October 1989	1.83 m (6 ft 0 in)	72 kg (159 lb)	320 cm (130 in)	300 cm (120 in)	(Poland) Kędzierzyn-Koźle
7	Kévin Tillie	2 November 1990	2.00 m (6 ft 7 in)	85 kg (187 lb)	345 cm (136 in)	325 cm (128 in)	(Italy) MODENA VOLLEY PUNTO
8	Julien Lyneel	15 April 1990	1.92 m (6 ft 4 in)	88 kg (194 lb)	345 cm (136 in)	325 cm (128 in)	(Poland) Jastrzębski Wiegel
9	Earvin N'Gapeth	12 February 1991	1.94 m (6 ft 4 in)	96 kg (212 lb)	358 cm (141 in)	327 cm (129 in)	(Russia) Zenit Kazan
10	Kévin Le Roux	11 May 1989	2.09 m (6 ft 10 in)	95 kg (209 lb)	365 cm (144 in)	345 cm (136 in)	(Brazil) Sada Cruzeiro Volei
11	Antoine Brizard (c)	22 May 1994	1.96 m (6 ft 5 in)	96 kg (212 lb)	340 cm (130 in)	310 cm (120 in)	(Poland) Warszawa
12	Stéphen Boyer	10 April 1996	1.96 m (6 ft 5 in)	77 kg (170 lb)	355 cm (140 in)	334 cm (131 in)	(Italy) Calzedonia Verona
13	Gildas Prevert	15 June 1996	2.04 m (6 ft 8 in)	90 kg (200 lb)	350 cm (140 in)	330 cm (130 in)	(France) RENNES EC
14	Nicolas Le Goff	15 February 1992	2.06 m (6 ft 9 in)	114 kg (251 lb)	365 cm (144 in)	345 cm (136 in)	(Germany) SCC BERLIN
15	Jérémie Mouiel	4 May 1995	1.76 m (5 ft 9 in)	52 kg (115 lb)	290 cm (110 in)	260 cm (100 in)	(France) Chaumont
16	Daryl Bultor	17 November 1995	1.97 m (6 ft 6 in)	94 kg (207 lb)	352 cm (139 in)	327 cm (129 in)	(France) Arago de Sète
17	Trévor Clévenot	28 June 1994	1.99 m (6 ft 6 in)	89 kg (196 lb)	345 cm (136 in)	326 cm (128 in)	(Italy) Revivre Axipower Milano
18	Thibault Rossard	28 August 1993	1.94 m (6 ft 4 in)	85 kg (187 lb)	350 cm (140 in)	320 cm (130 in)	(Poland) Rzeszów
19	Yacine Louati	4 March 1992	1.98 m (6 ft 6 in)	92 kg (203 lb)	345 cm (136 in)	320 cm (130 in)	(Italy) Kioene Padova
20	Nicolas Rossard	23 May 1990	1.83 m (6 ft 0 in)	64 kg (141 lb)	315 cm (124 in)	305 cm (120 in)	(Germany) SCC BERLIN
21	Barthélémy Chinenyeze	28 February 1998	2.01 m (6 ft 7 in)	81 kg (179 lb)	357 cm (141 in)	332 cm (131 in)	(France) Tours Volley-Ball
22	Meliuahel Takaniko	29 May 1985	1.94 m (6 ft 4 in)	92 kg (203 lb)	340 cm (130 in)	330 cm (130 in)	(France) TOAC TUC
23	Timothée Carle	30 November 1995	1.95 m (6 ft 5 in)	83 kg (183 lb)	336 cm (132 in)	314 cm (124 in)	(France) GFCA VOLLEY BALL
25	Kévin Kaba	8 June 1994	2.03 m (6 ft 8 in)	98 kg (216 lb)	335 cm (132 in)	315 cm (124 in)	(France) Montpellier VUC
25	Benjamin Diez	4 April 1998	1.83 m (6 ft 0 in)	80 kg (180 lb)	320 cm (130 in)	305 cm (120 in)	(France) Montpellier VUC

== Germany ==
The following is the Germany roster in the 2019 Men's Nations League.

Head coach: Andrea Giani

Selected to 14-man squad during preliminary round

No.	Name	Date of birth	Height	Weight	Spike	Block	2019-20 club
1	Christian Fromm	15 August 1990	2.04 m (6 ft 8 in)	99 kg (218 lb)	350 cm (140 in)	330 cm (130 in)	(Greece) Olympiacos Piraeus
2	Tobias Krick	22 October 1998	2.1 m (6 ft 11 in)	85 kg (187 lb)	350 cm (140 in)	330 cm (130 in)	(Italy) Top Volley Cisterna
3	Ruben Schott	8 July 1994	1.93 m (6 ft 4 in)	89 kg (196 lb)	326 cm (128 in)	309 cm (122 in)	(Poland) AZS Olsztyn
4	Adam Kocian	1 April 1995	1.92 m (6 ft 4 in)	83 kg (183 lb)	341 cm (134 in)	315 cm (124 in)	(Germany) United Volleys Frankfurt
5	Moritz Reichert	15 March 1995	1.94 m (6 ft 4 in)	85 kg (187 lb)	336 cm (132 in)	314 cm (124 in)	(Poland) Trefl Gdańsk
6	Denys Kaliberda	24 June 1990	1.93 m (6 ft 4 in)	95 kg (209 lb)	343 cm (135 in)	314 cm (124 in)	(Germany) Berlin Recycling Volleys
7	David Sossenheimer	21 June 1996	1.93 m (6 ft 4 in)	85 kg (187 lb)	354 cm (139 in)	340 cm (130 in)	(Italy) Sir Safety Perugia
8	Marcus Böhme	25 August 1985	2.12 m (6 ft 11 in)	114 kg (251 lb)	360 cm (140 in)	330 cm (130 in)	(Germany) VfB Friedrichshafen
10	Julian Zenger	26 August 1997	1.9 m (6 ft 3 in)	80 kg (180 lb)	330 cm (130 in)	315 cm (124 in)	(Germany) Berlin Recycling Volleys
11	Lukas Kampa (c)	29 November 1986	1.96 m (6 ft 5 in)	90 kg (200 lb)	335 cm (132 in)	320 cm (130 in)	(Poland) Jastrzebski Wegiel
12	Anton Brehme	10 August 1999	1.99 m (6 ft 6 in)	86 kg (190 lb)	329 cm (130 in)	322 cm (127 in)	(Germany) Berlin Recycling Volleys
13	Simon Hirsch	3 April 1992	2.04 m (6 ft 8 in)	96 kg (212 lb)	352 cm (139 in)	344 cm (135 in)	(France) Narbonne Volley
14	Moritz Karlitzek	12 August 1996	1.91 m (6 ft 3 in)	91 kg (201 lb)	335 cm (132 in)	310 cm (120 in)	(Italy) Modena Volley
15	Noah Baxpöhler	13 August 1993	2.1 m (6 ft 11 in)	85 kg (187 lb)	345 cm (136 in)	325 cm (128 in)	(Germany) United Volleys Frankfurt
16	Tomas Kocian-Falkenbach	27 March 1988	1.92 m (6 ft 4 in)	79 kg (174 lb)	325 cm (128 in)	319 cm (126 in)	(Germany) SWD Powervolleys Düren
17	Jan Zimmermann	12 February 1993	1.91 m (6 ft 3 in)	82 kg (181 lb)	340 cm (130 in)	312 cm (123 in)	(Italy) Sir Safety Perugia
18	Jakob Günthör	21 September 1995	2.11 m (6 ft 11 in)	96 kg (212 lb)	339 cm (133 in)	320 cm (130 in)	(Germany) VfB Friedrichshafen
19	Daniel Malescha	28 April 1994	2.03 m (6 ft 8 in)	90 kg (200 lb)	330 cm (130 in)	315 cm (124 in)	(Germany) VfB Friedrichshafen
20	Linus Weber	1 November 1999	1.99 m (6 ft 6 in)	85 kg (187 lb)	336 cm (132 in)	321 cm (126 in)	(Germany) VfB Friedrichshafen
21	Ivan Batanov	25 April 2000	1.82 m (6 ft 0 in)	78 kg (172 lb)	325 cm (128 in)	305 cm (120 in)	(Germany) SWD Powervolleys Düren
22	Louis Kunstmann	10 September 2000	1.98 m (6 ft 6 in)	85 kg (187 lb)	339 cm (133 in)	327 cm (129 in)	(Germany) VCO Berlin
23	Tim Peter	8 September 1997	1.93 m (6 ft 4 in)	81 kg (179 lb)	325 cm (128 in)	310 cm (120 in)	(Germany) WWK Volleys Herrsching
24	Christoph Marks	16 April 1997	2.02 m (6 ft 8 in)	84 kg (185 lb)	330 cm (130 in)	315 cm (124 in)	(Italy) Sieco Service Ortona
25	Lukas Maase	28 August 1998	2.08 m (6 ft 10 in)	95 kg (209 lb)	340 cm (130 in)	320 cm (130 in)	(Germany) VfB Friedrichshafen

== Iran ==
The following is the Iran roster in the 2019 Men's Nations League.

Head coach: Igor Kolakovic

Selected to 14-man squad during preliminary round
Selected for Final Six 14-man squad

No.	Name	Date of birth	Height	Weight	Spike	Block	2019-20 club
1	Shahram Mahmoudi	20 July 1988	1.98 m (6 ft 6 in)	95 kg (209 lb)	347 cm (137 in)	332 cm (131 in)	(Iran) Khatam Ardakan
2	Milad Ebadipour	17 October 1993	1.96 m (6 ft 5 in)	78 kg (172 lb)	350 cm (140 in)	310 cm (120 in)	(Poland) Skra Bełchatów
4	Saeid Marouf (C)	20 October 1985	1.89 m (6 ft 2 in)	81 kg (179 lb)	331 cm (130 in)	311 cm (122 in)	(Italy) Emma Villas Siena
5	Farhad Ghaemi	28 August 1989	1.97 m (6 ft 6 in)	73 kg (161 lb)	355 cm (140 in)	335 cm (132 in)	(Turkey) Ziraat Bankası
6	Mohammad Mousavi	22 August 1987	2.03 m (6 ft 8 in)	86 kg (190 lb)	362 cm (143 in)	344 cm (135 in)	(Iran) Payam Khorasan
7	Pouria Fayazi	12 January 1993	1.95 m (6 ft 5 in)	92 kg (203 lb)	335 cm (132 in)	325 cm (128 in)	(Iran) Shahrdari Varamin
8	Mohammad Reza Hazratpour	31 March 1999	1.87 m (6 ft 2 in)	87 kg (192 lb)	300 cm (120 in)	290 cm (110 in)	(Iran) Saipa
9	Masoud Gholami	2 April 1990	2.04 m (6 ft 8 in)	93 kg (205 lb)	349 cm (137 in)	331 cm (130 in)	(Iran) Shahrdari Varamin
10	Amir Ghafour	6 June 1991	2.02 m (6 ft 8 in)	90 kg (200 lb)	354 cm (139 in)	334 cm (131 in)	(Italy) Gi Group Monza
11	Saber Kazemi	24 December 1998	2.05 m (6 ft 9 in)	87 kg (192 lb)	340 cm (130 in)	325 cm (128 in)	(Turkey) Ziraat Bankası
14	Mohammad Javad Manavinejad	27 November 1995	1.98 m (6 ft 6 in)	94 kg (207 lb)	340 cm (130 in)	320 cm (130 in)	(Italy) Verona
15	Aliasghar Mojarad	30 October 1997	2.05 m (6 ft 9 in)	90 kg (200 lb)	330 cm (130 in)	310 cm (120 in)	(Iran) Shahrdari Varamin
16	Ali Shafiei	21 September 1991	1.90 m (6 ft 3 in)	80 kg (180 lb)	348 cm (137 in)	345 cm (136 in)	(Iran) Saipa
17	Meisam Salehi	17 November 1998	1.98 m (6 ft 6 in)	89 kg (196 lb)	345 cm (136 in)	330 cm (130 in)	(Iran) Kalleh Mazandaran
18	Salim Cheperli	19 December 1996	2.01 m (6 ft 7 in)	80 kg (180 lb)	340 cm (130 in)	330 cm (130 in)	(Iran) Paykan
19	Mohammad Reza Moazzen	20 September 1991	1.75 m (5 ft 9 in)	75 kg (165 lb)	292 cm (115 in)	281 cm (111 in)	(Iran) Shahrdari Tabriz
20	Porya Yali	21 January 1999	2.09 m (6 ft 10 in)	81 kg (179 lb)	335 cm (132 in)	320 cm (130 in)	(Iran) Paykan
21	Morteza Sharifi	27 May 1999	1.93 m (6 ft 4 in)	83 kg (183 lb)	340 cm (130 in)	320 cm (130 in)	(Italy) BluVolley Verona
22	Amirhossein Esfandiar	24 January 1999	2.05 m (6 ft 9 in)	110 kg (240 lb)	330 cm (130 in)	310 cm (120 in)	(Iran) Paykan
23	Ali Ramezani	24 January 1999	2.05 m (6 ft 9 in)	110 kg (240 lb)	330 cm (130 in)	310 cm (120 in)	(Iran) Kalleh Mazandaran
24	Javad Karimisouchelmaei	1 March 1998	2.04 m (6 ft 8 in)	104 kg (229 lb)	330 cm (130 in)	310 cm (120 in)	(Belgium) VC Maaseik
25	Amir Hossein Toukhteh	9 April 2001	2.03 m (6 ft 8 in)	79 kg (174 lb)	350 cm (140 in)	325 cm (128 in)	(Iran) Saipa
26	Amin Razavi	15 September 1990	1.93 m (6 ft 4 in)	85 kg (187 lb)	294 cm (116 in)	285 cm (112 in)	(Iran) Shahrdari Varamin
28	Mehran Feyzemamdoust	23 November 2001	2.05 m (6 ft 9 in)	77 kg (170 lb)	345 cm (136 in)	325 cm (128 in)	(Iran) Kalleh Mazandaran
29	Reza Abedini	15 September 1991	2.03 m (6 ft 8 in)	93 kg (205 lb)	354 cm (139 in)	348 cm (137 in)	(Iran) Paykan

== Italy ==
The following is the Italy roster in the 2019 Men's Nations League.

Head coach: Gianlorenzo Blengini

Selected to 14-man squad during preliminary round

No.	Name	Date of birth	Height	Weight	Spike	Block	2019-20 club
1	Davide Candellaro	6 July 1989	2.00 m (6 ft 7 in)	88 kg (194 lb)	340 cm (130 in)	320 cm (130 in)	(Italy) Trentino Volley
2	Riccardo Sbertoli	23 May 1998	1.88 m (6 ft 2 in)	85 kg (187 lb)	326 cm (128 in)	246 cm (97 in)	(Italy) Trentino Volley
3	Luca Spirito	30 October 1993	2.01 m (6 ft 7 in)	77 kg (170 lb)	338 cm (133 in)	262 cm (103 in)	(Italy) BluVolley Verona
4	Davide Gardini	11 February 1999	2.05 m (6 ft 9 in)	94 kg (207 lb)	330 cm (130 in)	310 cm (120 in)	(Italy) Volley Lube
5	Fabrizio Gironi	18 March 2000	2.00 m (6 ft 7 in)	81 kg (179 lb)	330 cm (130 in)	310 cm (120 in)	(Italy) Prisma Volley
6	Simone Giannelli (c)	8 September 1996	1.98 m (6 ft 6 in)	92 kg (203 lb)	350 cm (140 in)	330 cm (130 in)	(Italy) Sir Safety Umbria Volley
7	Giacomo Raffaelli	2 July 1995	1.98 m (6 ft 6 in)	95 kg (209 lb)	338 cm (133 in)	330 cm (130 in)	(Italy) G.S. Porto Robur Costa
8	Daniele Mazzone	6 April 1992	2.08 m (6 ft 10 in)	88 kg (194 lb)	345 cm (136 in)	323 cm (127 in)	(Italy) Modena Volley
11	Fabio Balaso	20 October 1995	1.78 m (5 ft 10 in)	73 kg (161 lb)	305 cm (120 in)	280 cm (110 in)	(Italy) Volley Lube
12	Fabio Ricci	11 July 1994	2.04 m (6 ft 8 in)	96 kg (212 lb)	348 cm (137 in)	272 cm (107 in)	(Italy) Sir Safety Umbria Volley
13	Federico Bonami	29 September 1993	1.83 m (6 ft 0 in)	70 kg (150 lb)	313 cm (123 in)	234 cm (92 in)	(Italy) Argos Volley
14	Matteo Piano	24 October 1990	2.08 m (6 ft 10 in)	102 kg (225 lb)	352 cm (139 in)	325 cm (128 in)	(Italy) Power Volley Milano
15	Roberto Russo	23 February 1997	1.76 m (5 ft 9 in)	52 kg (115 lb)	207 cm (81 in)	91 cm (36 in)	(Italy) Sir Safety Umbria Volley
16	Oleg Antonov	28 July 1988	1.98 m (6 ft 6 in)	88 kg (194 lb)	340 cm (130 in)	310 cm (120 in)	(Italy) You Energy Volley
17	Simone Anzani	24 February 1992	2.04 m (6 ft 8 in)	100 kg (220 lb)	350 cm (140 in)	330 cm (130 in)	(Italy) Volley Lube
18	Nicola Pesaresi	11 February 1991	1.90 m (6 ft 3 in)	80 kg (180 lb)	315 cm (124 in)	309 cm (122 in)	(Poland) Power Volley Milano
19	Daniele Lavia	4 November 1999	2.00 m (6 ft 7 in)	89 kg (196 lb)	345 cm (136 in)	316 cm (124 in)	(Italy) Trentino Volley
20	Gabriele Nelli	4 December 1993	2.10 m (6 ft 11 in)	89 kg (196 lb)	355 cm (140 in)	320 cm (130 in)	(Italy) Trentino Volley
21	Alberto Polo	7 September 1995	2.03 m (6 ft 8 in)	87 kg (192 lb)	348 cm (137 in)	318 cm (125 in)	(Italy) Pallavolo Padova
22	Oreste Cavuto	5 December 1996	1.96 m (6 ft 5 in)	87 kg (192 lb)	353 cm (139 in)	344 cm (135 in)	(Italy) Pallavolo Padova
23	Andrea Argenta	1 June 1996	2.05 m (6 ft 9 in)	95 kg (209 lb)	350 cm (140 in)	310 cm (120 in)	(Italy) G.S. Porto Robur Costa
24	Giulio Pinali	4 February 1997	1.99 m (6 ft 6 in)	91 kg (201 lb)	349 cm (137 in)	338 cm (133 in)	(Italy) Trentino Volley
25	Diego Cantagalli	13 February 1999	2.01 m (6 ft 7 in)	89 kg (196 lb)	348 cm (137 in)	310 cm (120 in)	(Italy) Volley Lube
27	Marco Pierottil	19 June 1996	1.95 m (6 ft 5 in)	86 kg (190 lb)	357 cm (141 in)	350 cm (140 in)	(Italy) Modena Volley
28	Francesco Recine	7 February 1999	1.86 m (6 ft 1 in)	75 kg (165 lb)	325 cm (128 in)	300 cm (120 in)	(Italy) You Energy Volley

== Japan ==
The following is the Japan roster in the 2019 Men's Nations League.

Head coach: Yuichi Nakagaichi

Selected to 14-man squad during preliminary round

No.	Name	Date of birth	Height	Weight	Spike	Block	2019-20 club
1	Issei Otake	3 December 1995	2.01 m (6 ft 7 in)	98 kg (216 lb)	345 cm (136 in)	327 cm (129 in)	(Japan) Panasonic Panthers
2	Hideomi Fukatsu	1 June 1990	1.80 m (5 ft 11 in)	70 kg (150 lb)	325 cm (128 in)	305 cm (120 in)	(Japan) Panasonic Panthers
3	Naonobu Fujii	5 January 1992	1.83 m (6 ft 0 in)	78 kg (172 lb)	312 cm (123 in)	297 cm (117 in)	(Japan) Toray Arrows
4	Akihiro Fukatsu	23 July 1987	1.83 m (6 ft 0 in)	78 kg (172 lb)	325 cm (128 in)	305 cm (120 in)	(Japan) JT Thunders
5	Tatsuya Fukuzawa	1 July 1986	1.89 m (6 ft 2 in)	88 kg (194 lb)	355 cm (140 in)	330 cm (130 in)	(Japan) Panasonic Panthers
6	Akihiro Yamauchi	30 November 1993	2.04 m (6 ft 8 in)	80 kg (180 lb)	353 cm (139 in)	335 cm (132 in)	(Japan) Panasonic Panthers
7	Takashi Dekita	13 August 1991	2.00 m (6 ft 7 in)	94 kg (207 lb)	346 cm (136 in)	331 cm (130 in)	(Japan) Osaka Blazers Sakai
8	Masahiro Yanagida (C)	6 July 1992	1.86 m (6 ft 1 in)	79 kg (174 lb)	328 cm (129 in)	301 cm (119 in)	(Poland) Cuprum Lubin
9	Satoshi Ide	16 January 1992	1.74 m (5 ft 9 in)	74 kg (163 lb)	303 cm (119 in)	290 cm (110 in)	(Japan) Toray Arrows
10	Taichiro Koga	4 October 1989	1.70 m (5 ft 7 in)	70 kg (150 lb)	292 cm (115 in)	277 cm (109 in)	(Japan) Toyoda Gosei Trefuerza
11	Yuji Nishida	30 January 2000	1.86 m (6 ft 1 in)	80 kg (180 lb)	346 cm (136 in)	330 cm (130 in)	(Japan) JTEKT Stings
12	Masahiro Sekita	20 November 1993	1.75 m (5 ft 9 in)	73 kg (161 lb)	331 cm (130 in)	296 cm (117 in)	(Japan) Osaka Blazers Sakai
13	Naoya Takano	30 April 1993	1.90 m (6 ft 3 in)	78 kg (172 lb)	338 cm (133 in)	316 cm (124 in)	(Japan) Osaka Blazers Sakai
14	Yūki Ishikawa	11 December 1995	1.91 m (6 ft 3 in)	84 kg (185 lb)	351 cm (138 in)	327 cm (129 in)	(Italy) Emma Villas Siena
15	Haku Ri	27 December 1990	1.93 m (6 ft 4 in)	82 kg (181 lb)	344 cm (135 in)	330 cm (130 in)	(Japan) Toray Arrows
16	Kentaro Takahashi	8 February 1995	2.01 m (6 ft 7 in)	103 kg (227 lb)	351 cm (138 in)	338 cm (133 in)	(Japan) Toray Arrows
17	Tsubasa Hisahara	18 March 1995	1.88 m (6 ft 2 in)	80 kg (180 lb)	339 cm (133 in)	320 cm (130 in)	(Japan) Panasonic Panthers
18	Masashi Kuriyama	14 July 1988	1.90 m (6 ft 3 in)	85 kg (187 lb)	350 cm (140 in)	335 cm (132 in)	(Japan) Suntory Sunbirds
19	Hiroaki Asano	6 October 1990	1.75 m (5 ft 9 in)	72 kg (159 lb)	311 cm (122 in)	295 cm (116 in)	(Japan) JTEKT Stings
20	Taishi Onodera	27 February 1996	2.01 m (6 ft 7 in)	98 kg (216 lb)	346 cm (136 in)	323 cm (127 in)	(Japan) JT Thunders
21	Kunihiro Shimizu	11 August 1986	1.93 m (6 ft 4 in)	97 kg (214 lb)	330 cm (130 in)	320 cm (130 in)	(Japan) Panasonic Panthers
22	Tomohiro Yamamoto	5 November 1994	1.71 m (5 ft 7 in)	69 kg (152 lb)	301 cm (119 in)	299 cm (118 in)	(Japan) Sakai Blazers
23	Yuki Higuchi	27 April 1996	1.91 m (6 ft 3 in)	79 kg (174 lb)	345 cm (136 in)	320 cm (130 in)	(Japan) Sakai Blazers
24	Jin Tsuzuki	28 December 1998	1.94 m (6 ft 4 in)	85 kg (187 lb)	345 cm (136 in)	320 cm (130 in)	(Japan) Chuo University

== Poland ==
The following is the Poland roster in the 2019 Men's Nations League.

Head coach: Vital Heynen / Jakub Bednaruk

Selected to 14-man squad during preliminary round
Selected for Final Six 14-man squad

No.	Name	Date of birth	Height	Weight	Spike	Block	2019-20 club
1	Piotr Nowakowski	18 December 1987	2.05 m (6 ft 9 in)	90 kg (200 lb)	355 cm (140 in)	340 cm (130 in)	(Poland) Trefl Gdańsk
2	Maciej Muzaj	21 May 1994	2.08 m (6 ft 10 in)	86 kg (190 lb)	360 cm (140 in)	320 cm (130 in)	(Poland) Trefl Gdańsk
3	Dawid Konarski	31 August 1989	1.98 m (6 ft 6 in)	93 kg (205 lb)	353 cm (139 in)	320 cm (130 in)	(Poland) Jastrzębski Węgiel
4	Marcin Komenda	24 May 1996	1.98 m (6 ft 6 in)	90 kg (200 lb)	335 cm (132 in)	315 cm (124 in)	(Poland) GKS Katowice
5	Łukasz Kaczmarek	29 June 1994	2.04 m (6 ft 8 in)	99 kg (218 lb)	345 cm (136 in)	332 cm (131 in)	(Poland) ZAKSA Kędzierzyn-Koźle
7	Artur Szalpuk	20 March 1995	2.01 m (6 ft 7 in)	93 kg (205 lb)	350 cm (140 in)	335 cm (132 in)	(Poland) PGE Skra Bełchatów
8	Jędrzej Gruszczyński	13 November 1997	1.86 m (6 ft 1 in)	78 kg (172 lb)	328 cm (129 in)	306 cm (120 in)	(Poland) Cuprum Lubin
10	Damian Wojtaszek	7 September 1988	1.80 m (5 ft 11 in)	76 kg (168 lb)	330 cm (130 in)	301 cm (119 in)	(Poland) ONICO Warszawa
11	Fabian Drzyzga	3 January 1990	1.96 m (6 ft 5 in)	90 kg (200 lb)	325 cm (128 in)	304 cm (120 in)	(Russia) VC Lokomotiv Novosibirsk
12	Grzegorz Łomacz	1 October 1987	1.87 m (6 ft 2 in)	80 kg (180 lb)	335 cm (132 in)	315 cm (124 in)	(Poland) PGE Skra Bełchatów
13	Michał Kubiak	23 February 1988	1.91 m (6 ft 3 in)	80 kg (180 lb)	328 cm (129 in)	312 cm (123 in)	(Japan) Panasonic Panthers
14	Aleksander Śliwka	24 May 1995	1.96 m (6 ft 5 in)	88 kg (194 lb)	340 cm (130 in)	315 cm (124 in)	(Poland) ZAKSA Kędzierzyn-Koźle
15	Jakub Kochanowski	17 July 1997	1.99 m (6 ft 6 in)	89 kg (196 lb)	353 cm (139 in)	323 cm (127 in)	(Poland) PGE Skra Bełchatów
16	Bartłomiej Bołądź	28 September 1994	2.03 m (6 ft 8 in)	97 kg (214 lb)	360 cm (140 in)	335 cm (132 in)	(Germany) VfB Friedrichshafen
17	Paweł Zatorski	21 June 1990	1.84 m (6 ft 0 in)	73 kg (161 lb)	328 cm (129 in)	304 cm (120 in)	(Poland) ZAKSA Kędzierzyn-Koźle
18	Bartosz Kwolek	17 July 1997	1.92 m (6 ft 4 in)	91 kg (201 lb)	343 cm (135 in)	310 cm (120 in)	(Poland) ONICO Warszawa
19	Marcin Janusz	31 July 1994	1.95 m (6 ft 5 in)	85 kg (187 lb)	330 cm (130 in)	316 cm (124 in)	(Poland) Trefl Gdańsk
20	Mateusz Bieniek	5 April 1994	2.10 m (6 ft 11 in)	98 kg (216 lb)	351 cm (138 in)	326 cm (128 in)	(Poland) ZAKSA Kędzierzyn-Koźle
21	Tomasz Fornal	31 August 1997	1.98 m (6 ft 6 in)	92 kg (203 lb)	340 cm (130 in)	315 cm (124 in)	(Poland) Cerrad Czarni Radom
22	Bartosz Bednorz	25 July 1994	2.01 m (6 ft 7 in)	84 kg (185 lb)	350 cm (140 in)	315 cm (124 in)	(Italy) Modena Volley
23	Jakub Popiwczak	17 April 1996	1.80 m (5 ft 11 in)	77 kg (170 lb)	315 cm (124 in)	300 cm (120 in)	(Poland) Jastrzębski Węgiel
27	Piotr Łukasik	11 July 1994	2.08 m (6 ft 10 in)	112 kg (247 lb)	350 cm (140 in)	330 cm (130 in)	(Poland) ONICO Warszawa
28	Bartosz Filipiak	27 February 1994	1.97 m (6 ft 6 in)	93 kg (205 lb)	357 cm (141 in)	341 cm (134 in)	(Poland) Łuczniczka Bydgoszcz
77	Karol Kłos (C)	8 August 1989	2.01 m (6 ft 7 in)	87 kg (192 lb)	357 cm (141 in)	326 cm (128 in)	(Poland) PGE Skra Bełchatów
88	Andrzej Wrona	27 December 1988	2.05 m (6 ft 9 in)	95 kg (209 lb)	350 cm (140 in)	265 cm (104 in)	(Poland) ONICO Warszawa
99	Norbert Huber	14 August 1998	2.04 m (6 ft 8 in)	80 kg (180 lb)	351 cm (138 in)	316 cm (124 in)	(Poland) Cerrad Czarni Radom

== Portugal ==
The following is the Portugal roster in the 2019 Men's Nations League.

Head coach: Hugo Silva

Selected to 14-man squad during preliminary round

No.	Name	Date of birth	Height	Weight	Spike	Block	2019-20 club
1	Valdir Sequeira	22 November 1981	1.96 m (6 ft 5 in)	86 kg (190 lb)	351 cm (138 in)	344 cm (135 in)	(Italy) Videx Grottazzolina
2	Andre Marques	10 April 2000	1.89 m (6 ft 2 in)	71 kg (157 lb)	330 cm (130 in)	317 cm (125 in)	(Portugal) Famalicense AC
3	Nuno Teixeira	24 September 1998	2.14 m (7 ft 0 in)	89 kg (196 lb)	350 cm (140 in)	340 cm (130 in)	(Portugal) VC Viana
4	Filip Cveticanin	19 June 1996	1.99 m (6 ft 6 in)	90 kg (200 lb)	320 cm (130 in)	310 cm (120 in)	(Portugal) S.L. Benfica
5	Gil Pereira	21 February 1995	1.76 m (5 ft 9 in)	70 kg (150 lb)	300 cm (120 in)	285 cm (112 in)	(Portugal) Esmoriz GC
6	Alexandre Ferreira (C)	13 November 1991	2.02 m (6 ft 8 in)	87 kg (192 lb)	361 cm (142 in)	346 cm (136 in)	(Poland) Warta Zawiercie
7	Marco Ferreira	4 October 1987	2.02 m (6 ft 8 in)	94 kg (207 lb)	359 cm (141 in)	337 cm (133 in)	(Portugal) SC Espinho
8	Tiago Violas	27 March 1989	1.93 m (6 ft 4 in)	82 kg (181 lb)	326 cm (128 in)	303 cm (119 in)	(Portugal) S.L. Benfica
9	Joao Simoes	11 June 1986	1.94 m (6 ft 4 in)	85 kg (187 lb)	325 cm (128 in)	315 cm (124 in)	(Portugal) Sporting CP
10	Phelipe Martins	2 March 1991	2.02 m (6 ft 8 in)	91 kg (201 lb)	307 cm (121 in)	289 cm (114 in)	(Portugal) SC Espinho
11	Bruno Cunha	18 August 1997	1.94 m (6 ft 4 in)	90 kg (200 lb)	320 cm (130 in)	308 cm (121 in)	(Portugal) VC Viana
12	Lourenco Martins	30 April 1997	1.95 m (6 ft 5 in)	78 kg (172 lb)	308 cm (121 in)	298 cm (117 in)	(Portugal) SC Espinho
13	Caique Ferreira da Silva	9 August 1985	1.91 m (6 ft 3 in)	94 kg (207 lb)	335 cm (132 in)	330 cm (130 in)	(Portugal) AJ Fonte do Bastardo
14	Guilherme Menezes	20 December 2000	1.96 m (6 ft 5 in)	93 kg (205 lb)	325 cm (128 in)	315 cm (124 in)	(Portugal) SC Espinho
15	Miguel Tavares	2 March 1993	1.92 m (6 ft 4 in)	68 kg (150 lb)	315 cm (124 in)	293 cm (115 in)	(France) Rennes Volley 35
16	Hugo Gaspar	2 September 1982	2 m (6 ft 7 in)	83 kg (183 lb)	354 cm (139 in)	343 cm (135 in)	(Portugal) S.L. Benfica
17	Joao Fidalgo	2 November 1986	1.72 m (5 ft 8 in)	67 kg (148 lb)	307 cm (121 in)	285 cm (112 in)	(Portugal) Sporting CP
18	Frederico Santos	16 September 1997	1.87 m (6 ft 2 in)	63 kg (139 lb)	314 cm (124 in)	296 cm (117 in)	(United States) Purdue University Fort Wayne
19	Jose Gomes	21 October 1994	1.98 m (6 ft 6 in)	90 kg (200 lb)	327 cm (129 in)	307 cm (121 in)	(Romania) Dinamo București
20	Jose Pedro Monteiro	21 October 1991	1.85 m (6 ft 1 in)	73 kg (161 lb)	301 cm (119 in)	290 cm (110 in)	(Portugal) Sporting CP
21	Afonso Reis	9 August 1999	1.83 m (6 ft 0 in)	78 kg (172 lb)	310 cm (120 in)	290 cm (110 in)	(Portugal) AA São Mamede
22	Januario Silva	5 July 1984	1.94 m (6 ft 4 in)	88 kg (194 lb)	295 cm (116 in)	290 cm (110 in)	(Portugal) SC Espinho
23	Miguel Sinfronio	18 March 1999	1.94 m (6 ft 4 in)	88 kg (194 lb)	312 cm (123 in)	305 cm (120 in)	(Portugal) S.L. Benfica

== Russia ==
The following is the Russia roster in the 2019 Men's Nations League.

Head coach: Tuomas Sammelvuo

Selected to 14-man squad during preliminary round
Selected for Final Six 14-man squad

No.	Name	Date of birth	Height	Weight	Spike	Block	2019-20 club
1	Pavel Pankov	14 August 1995	1.98 m (6 ft 6 in)	90 kg (200 lb)	345 cm (136 in)	330 cm (130 in)	(Russia) Zenit Saint Petersburg
2	Ilya Vlasov	3 August 1995	2.12 m (6 ft 11 in)	98 kg (216 lb)	360 cm (140 in)	345 cm (136 in)	(Russia) Fakel Novy Urengoy
3	Dmitry Kovalyov	15 March 1991	1.98 m (6 ft 6 in)	82 kg (181 lb)	340 cm (130 in)	330 cm (130 in)	(Russia) Ural Ufa
4	Denis Zemchenok	11 August 1987	2.03 m (6 ft 8 in)	93 kg (205 lb)	350 cm (140 in)	333 cm (131 in)	(Russia) Belogorie
6	Anton Karpukhov	23 April 1988	1.97 m (6 ft 6 in)	88 kg (194 lb)	337 cm (133 in)	325 cm (128 in)	(Russia) Kuzbass Kemerovo
7	Dmitry Volkov	25 May 1995	2.01 m (6 ft 7 in)	88 kg (194 lb)	340 cm (130 in)	330 cm (130 in)	(Russia) Fakel Novy Urengoy
8	Anton Semyshev	22 August 1997	2.01 m (6 ft 7 in)	90 kg (200 lb)	350 cm (140 in)	340 cm (130 in)	(Russia) Belogorie
9	Ivan Iakovlev	17 April 1995	2.07 m (6 ft 9 in)	89 kg (196 lb)	360 cm (140 in)	350 cm (140 in)	(Russia) Fakel Novy Urengoy
10	Fedor Voronkov	10 December 1995	2.07 m (6 ft 9 in)	85 kg (187 lb)	350 cm (140 in)	340 cm (130 in)	(Russia) NOVA Novokuybyshevsk
11	Igor Filippov	19 March 1991	2.05 m (6 ft 9 in)	107 kg (236 lb)	340 cm (130 in)	326 cm (128 in)	(Russia) Ural Ufa
12	Aleksei Safonov	6 September 1989	2.05 m (6 ft 9 in)	102 kg (225 lb)	341 cm (134 in)	328 cm (129 in)	(Russia) Zenit Saint Petersburg
14	Yaroslav Podlesnykh	3 September 1994	1.98 m (6 ft 6 in)	89 kg (196 lb)	341 cm (134 in)	330 cm (130 in)	(Russia) Kuzbass Kemerovo
15	Viktor Poletaev	27 July 1995	1.97 m (6 ft 6 in)	86 kg (190 lb)	360 cm (140 in)	340 cm (130 in)	(Russia) Kuzbass Kemerovo
17	Maxim Mikhaylov	19 March 1988	2.02 m (6 ft 8 in)	103 kg (227 lb)	345 cm (136 in)	330 cm (130 in)	(Russia) Zenit Kazan
18	Egor Kliuka	15 June 1995	2.09 m (6 ft 10 in)	93 kg (205 lb)	360 cm (140 in)	350 cm (140 in)	(Russia) Fakel Novy Urengoy
20	Ilyas Kurkaev	18 January 1994	2.07 m (6 ft 9 in)	95 kg (209 lb)	355 cm (140 in)	335 cm (132 in)	(Russia) Lokomotiv Novosibirsk
21	Evgeny Baranov	30 June 1995	1.80 m (5 ft 11 in)	70 kg (150 lb)	300 cm (120 in)	290 cm (110 in)	(Russia) Dinamo Moscow
22	Roman Martynyuk	13 April 1987	1.82 m (6 ft 0 in)	75 kg (165 lb)	320 cm (130 in)	310 cm (120 in)	(Russia) Lokomotiv Novosibirsk
23	Roman Poroshin	28 August 1995	1.96 m (6 ft 5 in)	90 kg (200 lb)	332 cm (131 in)	321 cm (126 in)	(Russia) Belogorie
24	Igor Kobzar (C)	13 April 1991	1.98 m (6 ft 6 in)	86 kg (190 lb)	337 cm (133 in)	315 cm (124 in)	(Russia) Kuzbass Kemerovo
25	Inal Tavasiev	28 March 1989	2.02 m (6 ft 8 in)	98 kg (216 lb)	343 cm (135 in)	332 cm (131 in)	(Russia) Kuzbass Kemerovo
27	Valentin Golubev	3 May 1992	1.90 m (6 ft 3 in)	70 kg (150 lb)	310 cm (120 in)	305 cm (120 in)	(Russia) Belogorie
28	Kirill Klets	15 March 1998	2.02 m (6 ft 8 in)	92 kg (203 lb)	340 cm (130 in)	330 cm (130 in)	(Germany) Hypo Tirol Alpenvolleys Haching
29	Kirill Ursov	13 February 1995	1.94 m (6 ft 4 in)	86 kg (190 lb)	335 cm (132 in)	325 cm (128 in)	(Russia) Gazprom-Yugra Surgut
30	Alexey Samoylenko	23 June 1985	2.07 m (6 ft 9 in)	98 kg (216 lb)	360 cm (140 in)	330 cm (130 in)	(Russia) Zenit Saint Petersburg

== Serbia ==
The following is the Serbia roster in the 2019 Men's Nations League.

Head coach: Nikola Grbić

Selected to 14-man squad during preliminary round

No.	Name	Date of birth	Height	Weight	Spike	Block	2019-20 club
1	Aleksandar Okolić	26 June 1993	2.05 m (6 ft 9 in)	90 kg (200 lb)	347 cm (137 in)	320 cm (130 in)	(Italy) Power Volley Milano
2	Uroš Kovačević	6 May 1993	1.97 m (6 ft 6 in)	90 kg (200 lb)	340 cm (130 in)	320 cm (130 in)	(Italy) Trentino
3	Milan Katić	22 October 1993	2.02 m (6 ft 8 in)	99 kg (218 lb)	345 cm (136 in)	331 cm (130 in)	(Poland) Skra Bełchatów
4	Nemanja Petric	28 July 1987	2.03 m (6 ft 8 in)	96 kg (212 lb)	350 cm (140 in)	320 cm (130 in)	(Italy) Power Volley Milano
5	Lazar Ćirović	26 February 1992	1.96 m (6 ft 5 in)	83 kg (183 lb)	343 cm (135 in)	323 cm (127 in)	(Serbia) FK Radnički 1923
6	Nikola Pekovic	6 March 1990	1.76 m (5 ft 9 in)	77 kg (170 lb)	298 cm (117 in)	280 cm (110 in)	(Serbia) OK Partizan
7	Petar Krsmanović	1 June 1990	2.05 m (6 ft 9 in)	98 kg (216 lb)	354 cm (139 in)	330 cm (130 in)	(Italy) Volley Piacenza
8	Marko Ivović	22 December 1990	1.94 m (6 ft 4 in)	89 kg (196 lb)	365 cm (144 in)	330 cm (130 in)	(Russia) VC Lokomotiv Novosibirsk
9	Nikola Jovović	13 February 1992	1.97 m (6 ft 6 in)	75 kg (165 lb)	335 cm (132 in)	315 cm (124 in)	(Russia) Ural Ufa
10	Miran Kujundžić	19 June 1997	1.96 m (6 ft 5 in)	86 kg (190 lb)	348 cm (137 in)	334 cm (131 in)	(France) Paris Volley
11	Aleksa Batak	18 January 2000	1.98 m (6 ft 6 in)	89 kg (196 lb)	346 cm (136 in)	337 cm (133 in)	(Italy) Consar Ravenna
12	Dušan Petković	27 January 1992	2.02 m (6 ft 8 in)	86 kg (190 lb)	328 cm (129 in)	310 cm (120 in)	(Poland) Skra Bełchatów
13	Stevan Simić	21 March 1996	2.01 m (6 ft 7 in)	85 kg (187 lb)	330 cm (130 in)	315 cm (124 in)	(Serbia) Vojvodina
14	Aleksandar Atanasijević	4 September 1991	2.00 m (6 ft 7 in)	92 kg (203 lb)	350 cm (140 in)	329 cm (130 in)	(Italy) Perugia
15	Nemanja Masulovic	5 October 1995	2.05 m (6 ft 9 in)	92 kg (203 lb)	355 cm (140 in)	330 cm (130 in)	(Serbia) Vojvodina
16	Dražen Luburić	2 November 1993	2.02 m (6 ft 8 in)	90 kg (200 lb)	337 cm (133 in)	331 cm (130 in)	(Russia) VC Belogorie
17	Neven Majstorović	17 March 1989	1.93 m (6 ft 4 in)	90 kg (200 lb)	335 cm (132 in)	325 cm (128 in)	(Romania) SCMU Craiova
19	Stefan Negic	17 January 2000	1.8 m (5 ft 11 in)	75 kg (165 lb)	305 cm (120 in)	290 cm (110 in)	(Serbia) Vojvodina
20	Srećko Lisinac	17 May 1992	2.05 m (6 ft 9 in)	90 kg (200 lb)	355 cm (140 in)	342 cm (135 in)	(Italy) Trentino Volley
21	Vuk Todorovic	23 April 1998	1.9 m (6 ft 3 in)	74 kg (163 lb)	315 cm (124 in)	305 cm (120 in)	(Serbia) Vojvodina
23	Bozidar Vucicevic	9 December 1998	2.05 m (6 ft 9 in)	96 kg (212 lb)	363 cm (143 in)	343 cm (135 in)	(Slovenia) ACH Volley
24	David Mehić	24 September 1997	1.96 m (6 ft 5 in)	83 kg (183 lb)	345 cm (136 in)	330 cm (130 in)	(France) Nice VB
27	Stefan Kovacevic	22 February 1995	2.05 m (6 ft 9 in)	88 kg (194 lb)	355 cm (140 in)	335 cm (132 in)	(Croatia) HAOK Mladost
28	Danilo Pavlovic	23 April 1997	1.96 m (6 ft 5 in)	85 kg (187 lb)	365 cm (144 in)	335 cm (132 in)	(Belarus) Shakhtior Soligorsk

== United States ==
The following is the United States roster in the 2019 Men's Nations League.

Head coach: John Speraw

Selected to 14-man squad during preliminary round
Selected for Final Six 14-man squad

No.	Name	Date of birth	Height	Weight	Spike	Block	2019-20 club
1	Matt Anderson	18 April 1987	2.02 m (6 ft 8 in)	100 kg (220 lb)	360 cm (140 in)	332 cm (131 in)	(Italy) Perugia
2	Aaron Russell	4 June 1993	2.05 m (6 ft 9 in)	98 kg (216 lb)	356 cm (140 in)	337 cm (133 in)	(Italy) Sir Safety Perugia
3	Taylor Sander (C)	17 March 1992	1.96 m (6 ft 5 in)	80 kg (180 lb)	345 cm (136 in)	320 cm (130 in)	(Poland) KPS Skra Belchatow
4	Jeffrey Jendryk	15 September 1995	2.08 m (6 ft 10 in)	89 kg (196 lb)	353 cm (139 in)	345 cm (136 in)	(Germany) SCC Berlin
5	Kyle Ensing	6 March 1997	2.01 m (6 ft 7 in)	100 kg (220 lb)	366 cm (144 in)	353 cm (139 in)	(Israel) Maccabi Tel Aviv
6	Mitchell Stahl	31 August 1994	2.03 m (6 ft 8 in)	84 kg (185 lb)	350 cm (140 in)	325 cm (128 in)	(Poland) Stal Nysa
7	Kawika Shoji	11 November 1987	1.90 m (6 ft 3 in)	79 kg (174 lb)	331 cm (130 in)	315 cm (124 in)	(Italy) Pallavolo Padova
8	Torey Defalco	10 April 1997	1.98 m (6 ft 6 in)	95 kg (209 lb)	340 cm (130 in)	328 cm (129 in)	(Poland) Indykpol AZS Olsztyn
9	Jake Langlois	14 May 1992	2.08 m (6 ft 10 in)	93 kg (205 lb)	365 cm (144 in)	355 cm (140 in)	(Poland) MKS Będzin
10	Daniel Mcdonnell	15 September 1988	2.00 m (6 ft 7 in)	90 kg (200 lb)	355 cm (140 in)	345 cm (136 in)	(France) Chaumont Volley-Ball 52
11	Micah Christenson	8 May 1993	1.98 m (6 ft 6 in)	88 kg (194 lb)	349 cm (137 in)	340 cm (130 in)	(Russia) VC Zenit-Kazan
12	Maxwell Holt	12 March 1987	2.05 m (6 ft 9 in)	90 kg (200 lb)	351 cm (138 in)	333 cm (131 in)	(Italy) Milano
13	Benjamin Patch	21 June 1994	2.03 m (6 ft 8 in)	90 kg (200 lb)	368 cm (145 in)	348 cm (137 in)	(Germany) SCC Berlin
14	Micah Maʻa	16 April 1997	1.92 m (6 ft 4 in)	88 kg (194 lb)	323 cm (127 in)	318 cm (125 in)	(France) Stade Poitevin Poitiers
16	Joshua Tuaniga	18 March 1997	1.91 m (6 ft 3 in)	102 kg (225 lb)	320 cm (130 in)	307 cm (121 in)	(Poland) Ślepsk Suwałki
17	Thomas Jaeschke	4 September 1993	1.98 m (6 ft 6 in)	84 kg (185 lb)	348 cm (137 in)	330 cm (130 in)	(Italy) Milano
18	Garrett Muagututia	26 February 1988	2.05 m (6 ft 9 in)	92 kg (203 lb)	359 cm (141 in)	345 cm (136 in)	(Egypt) Al Ahly
19	Taylor Averill	5 March 1992	2.01 m (6 ft 7 in)	94 kg (207 lb)	370 cm (150 in)	330 cm (130 in)	(Italy) Milano
20	David Smith	15 May 1985	2.01 m (6 ft 7 in)	86 kg (190 lb)	348 cm (137 in)	314 cm (124 in)	(Poland) Zawiercie
21	Dustin Watten	27 October 1986	1.82 m (6 ft 0 in)	80 kg (180 lb)	306 cm (120 in)	295 cm (116 in)	(Poland) GKS Katowice
22	Erik Shoji	24 August 1989	1.84 m (6 ft 0 in)	83 kg (183 lb)	330 cm (130 in)	321 cm (126 in)	(Poland) ZAKSA Kędzierzyn-Koźle
23	Larry Tuileta Jr.	24 September 1995	1.84 m (6 ft 0 in)	95 kg (209 lb)	335 cm (132 in)	318 cm (125 in)	(United States) University of Hawaiʻi
24	Kyle Dagostino	18 May 1995	1.75 m (5 ft 9 in)	75 kg (165 lb)	312 cm (123 in)	307 cm (121 in)	(Finland) Raision Loimu
25	Kyle Russell	25 August 1993	2.06 m (6 ft 9 in)	97 kg (214 lb)	358 cm (141 in)	343 cm (135 in)	(South Korea) Daejeon Samsung Fire Bluefangs
29	Price Jarman	21 November 1992	2.04 m (6 ft 8 in)	100 kg (220 lb)	350 cm (140 in)	331 cm (130 in)	(Brazil) Associacao Itapetininga de Vol
30	George Huhmann	17 October 1997	2.12 m (6 ft 11 in)	93 kg (205 lb)	358 cm (141 in)	345 cm (136 in)	(Belgium) W0534 Knack Roeselare

== See also ==
- 2019 FIVB Women's Volleyball Nations League squads
- 2019 FIVB Volleyball Men's Challenger Cup squads
