= Vojvodina (disambiguation) =

Vojvodina is an autonomous province in Serbia.

Vojvodina may also refer to:

== In history ==
- Serbian Vojvodina, a Serbian autonomous region within the Austrian Empire, proclaimed during the 1848 Revolution
- Voivodeship of Serbia and Temes Banat, a voivodship (duchy) of the Austrian Empire that existed between 1849 and 1860
- Banat, Bačka and Baranja, a de facto existing province of the Kingdom of Serbia and the Kingdom of Serbs, Croats and Slovenes between October 1918 and March 1919
- Socialist Autonomous Province of Vojvodina, one of the two socialist autonomous provinces of the Socialist Republic of Serbia from 1963 to 1990
- Voivodeship, a unit of administration dating to medieval Romania, Hungary, Poland, Lithuania, Latvia, Russia and Serbia

== In sport ==
- Vojvodina Novi Sad, a sports society (polideportivo) from Novi Sad, Serbia
- FK Vojvodina, a football club from Novi Sad, Serbia
- KK Vojvodina, a basketball club from Novi Sad, Serbia
- OK Vojvodina, a volleyball club from Novi Sad, Serbia

== In politics ==
- Vojvodina Coalition, a political party in the Serbian province of Vojvodina
- Republic of Vojvodina, a political program of the League of Social Democrats of Vojvodina

== In tourism ==
- Old Vojvodina hotel, a hotel on the central square in Zrenjanin, Serbia

== See also ==
- Vojvodinci, a village in Serbia
