= Škundrić =

Škundrić (Serbian Cyrillic: Шкундрић) is a Serbian surname. Notable people with the surname include:

- Goran Škundrić (born 1987), Serbian volleyball player
- Petar Škundrić (born 1947), Serbian politician
