= Gabrijel =

Gabrijel is a given name. Notable people with the name include:

- Gabrijel Boban (born 1989), Croatian professional footballer
- Gabrijel Bukatko (1913–1981), Serbian Roman Catholic prelate, Croatian Greek Catholic hierarch
- Gabrijel Jurkić (1886–1974), Bosnian Croat artist
- Gabrijel Palković (1715–1759), Ruthenian and Croatian Greek Catholic hierarch
- Gabrijel Radić (born 1982), Serbian volleyball player
- Gabrijel Radojičić (born 1973), Serbian football manager and former striker
- Gabrijel Šivalec (born 2008), Croatian professional footballer
- Gabrijel Smičiklas (1783–1856), Croatian Greek Catholic hierarch
- Gabrijel Veočić (born 2001), Croatian boxer

== See also ==
- Gabriel (disambiguation)
