= Čurović =

Čurović (Serbian Cyrillic: Чуровић) is a Serbian surname. Notable people with the surname include:

- Dejan Čurović (born 1968), former Serbian footballer
- Petar Čurović (born 1984), Montenegrin volleyball player
- Tamara Čurović (born 1994), Serbian tennis player
