= Miloš Vemić =

Serbian volleyball player (born 1987)

Personal information
- Full name: Miloš Vemić
- Nationality: Serbian
- Born: March 8, 1987 (age 39); Novi Sad, Yugoslavia
- Height: 2.02 m (6 ft 8 in)
- Weight: 90 kg (200 lb)
- Spike: 338 cm (133 in)
- Block: 320 cm (130 in)

Volleyball information
- Position: Outside hitter
- Current club: BBTS Bielsko-Biała
- Number: 11 (club), 16 (national team)

Career
| Years | Teams |
|---|---|
| 2004–2010; 2010–2012; 2012–2013; 2013–2014; 2014–2015; 2015–2016; 2016– | OK Vojvodina Novi Sad; VfB Friedrichshafen; Maliye Milli Piyango Ankara; Al-Ahli Club Dubai; Tourcoing Lille; OK Vojvodina Novi Sad; BBTS Bielsko-Biała |

National team
| 2012– | Serbia |
- Last updated: 13 February 2017

Miloš Vemić (Serbian Cyrillic: Милош Вемић, born 8 March 1987) is a Serbian volleyball player, a member of Serbia men's national volleyball team and Polish club BBTS Bielsko-Biała, 2007 Serbian Champion, 2011 German Champion.

== Career ==
He started his career as a player of his hometown team OK Vojvodina. In 2007 his team became Serbian Champion. He left the club in 2010 as a captain. In 2010 he went to German VfB Friedrichshafen and stayed there two season. In 2011 he became German Champion. In 2012 he signed one-year contract with Turkish Maliye Milli Piyango SK. Then he spent per one season in three clubs: Al-Ahli Club Dubai, Tourcoing Lille, OK Vojvodina Novi Sad. In 2016 he signed contract with Polish team BBTS Bielsko-Biała.

== Sporting achievements ==
=== Clubs ===
==== National championships ====
- 2004/2005 Serbian and Montenegrin Cup, with OK Vojvodina Novi Sad
- 2004/2005 Serbian and Montenegrin Championship, with OK Vojvodina Novi Sad
- 2005/2006 Serbian and Montenegrin Cup, with OK Vojvodina Novi Sad
- 2005/2006 Serbian and Montenegrin Championship, with OK Vojvodina Novi Sad
- 2006/2007 Serbian Cup, with OK Vojvodina Novi Sad
- 2006/2007 Serbian Championship, with OK Vojvodina Novi Sad
- 2007/2008 Serbian Championship, with OK Vojvodina Novi Sad
- 2008/2009 Serbian Championship, with OK Vojvodina Novi Sad
- 2009/2010 Serbian Cup, with OK Vojvodina Novi Sad
- 2010/2011 German Championship, with VfB Friedrichshafen
- 2011/2012 German Cup, with VfB Friedrichshafen
- 2011/2012 German Championship, with VfB Friedrichshafen
- 2015/2016 Serbian Championship, with OK Vojvodina Novi Sad
