= Zrenjanin Theatre =

Theatre building in Zrenjanin, Serbia

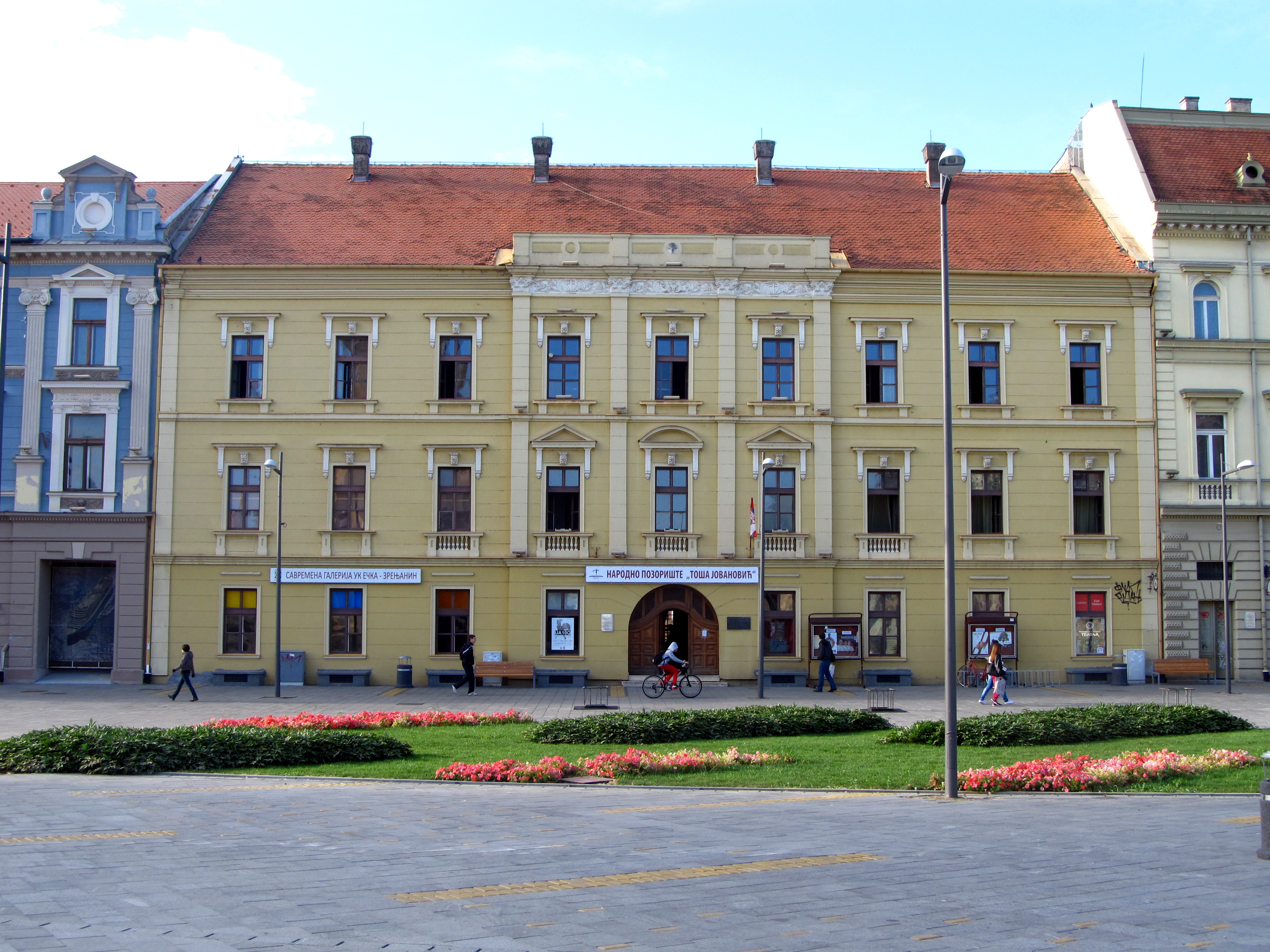
National Theatre "Toša Jovanović" in Zrenjanin

National Theatre "Toša Jovanović" (Serbian Cyrillic: Народно позориште „Тоша Јовановић”, romanized: Narodno pozorište „Toša Jovanović”) in Zrenjanin was built around 1835. It is believed to have been converted to a theater from an old grain warehouse. It is located at the city main square - Trg slobode (Liberty Square). It is located between buildings of the Old Vojvodina hotel and Finance palace.

== Foundations ==
The theater is the oldest theater in Serbia, built around 1835 in the yard of the city tax office. It is believed by many that the theater was originally an old grain warehouse built during the 18th century, however, there is no evidence to support this, with a map from 1793 showing no such warehouse.

== Renovations ==
The theater was renovated and reconstructed multiple times throughout its history. The theater was first reconstructed in 1884 after a fire had broken out two years before. During this reconstruction, the stage was rebuilt higher and an orchestra pit was created. In 1923, the theater was expanded using the neighboring former tax office. During this expansion, a foyer, cash register, and a buffet were added. In 1927, electricity was installed in the theater. During 1980 and 1984, old photographs and documentation were used for conservation efforts were used to restore the theater. During the 1984 restoration, another story added to the building in order to make its height even with neighboring buildings. During the 1980s, there was a push to create a more modern theater, but these plans were rejected due to the historical significance of the theater. In 2022, the façade of the building was restored. In 2006, the roof was renovated.

== Theatre in Zrenjanin ==
First professional theatre in Zrenjanin was founded in 1946, and named National theatre "Toša Jovanović", after the famous theatre actor from Zrenjanin, who lived in the nineteenth century.

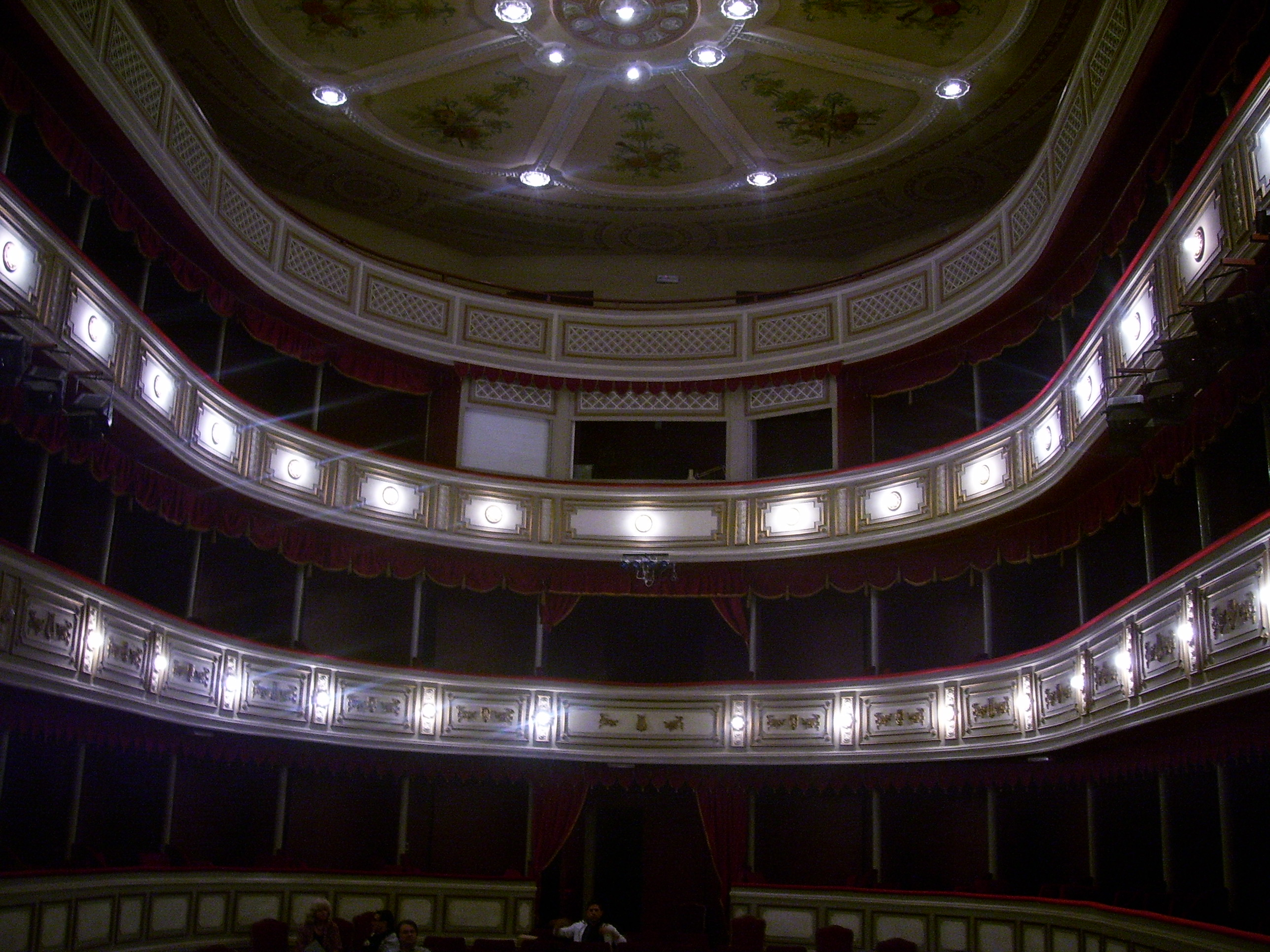
National Theatre interior

== See also ==
- Tourism in Serbia
- National Theatre "Toša Jovanović"
