= Old Vojvodina Hotel =

Hotel in Serbia

Hotel "Vojvodina" in the 1930s, on the right

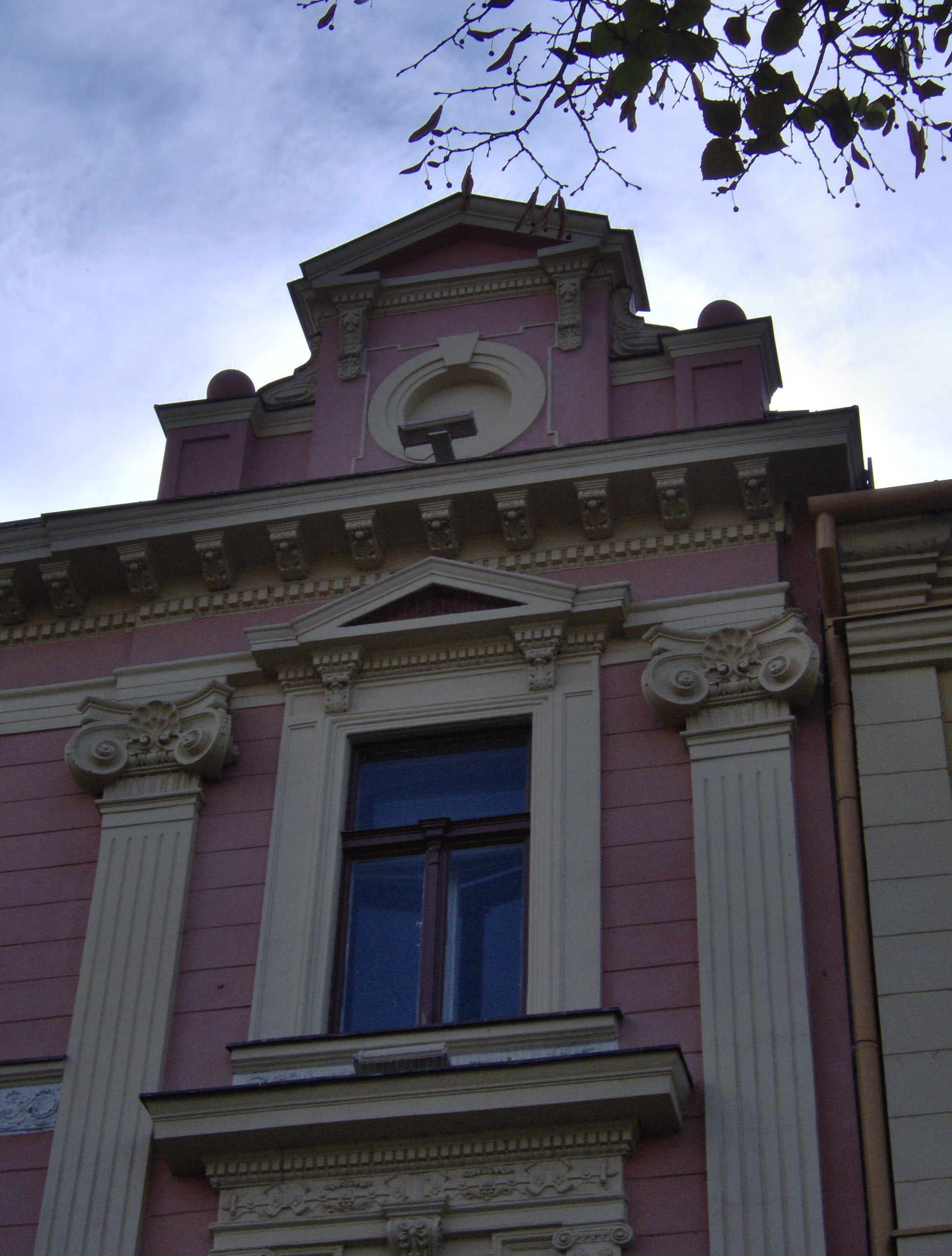
Detail of the facade (attica)

Old Vojvodina Hotel is a building of the former "Vojvodina" hotel. It is located on the central square, Trg Slobode (Liberty Square), in Zrenjanin, Serbia, next to the famous theatre building.

== History ==
Hotel "Rózsa" was built in 1886 by the projects of Ferenc Pelzl, in neorenaissance. It has two floors and a back yard to the Begej river. After 1918 hotel was renamed to "Vojvodina" and was the best hotel in Veliki Bečkerek. Hotel stayed in this building until 1972, when a new building was built just beside the old building.

== Today ==
After 1972, the building was no more a hotel. Since then, the ground floor became a bank, while the upper floors became offices.

The facade was restored the last time in 2004, when flood lights were installed, so today it is possible to see all its beauty.

== See also ==
- Tourism in Serbia
- National Theatre "Toša Jovanović"
- Theatre building, Zrenjanin
- Finance palace
