= Gabrijel Radić =

Serbian volleyball player

Personal information
- Full name: Gabrijel Radić
- Born: 21 March 1982 (age 44); Novi Sad, Serbia
- Height: 2.02 m (6 ft 7 1/2 in)
- Weight: 96 kg (212 lb)
- Block: 327

Volleyball information
- Current club: NIS Vojvodina Novi Sad
- Number: 9

Gabrijel Radić is a Serbian volleyball player, currently playing for NIS Vojvodina Novi Sad.

== Previous teams ==
2000–2004 year, NIS Vojvodina Novi Sad–Novi Sad (SRB)

2004–2005 year, EAP PATRA Volleyball Club- GREECE

2005–2006 year, V.C "SPOLETO"–A2 ( ITA )

2006–2007 year, VC Iskra Odintsovo–(RUSSIA)

2007–2008 year, Aris Volleyball Club–Thessaloniki (GRE)

2008–2009 year, V.C "Milonas" - (GRE)

2009–2010 year, NIS Vojvodina Novi Sad (SRB)

2010–2011 year, Lamia Volleyball Club- GRE

2011–2012 year, Cambrai Volleyball Club- FRANCE

2012–2013 year, Martigues VC- FRANCE

== Titles ==
Best middle blocker of Greek Championship for season 2007–08

== National team ==
25 matches in Junior National Team of Serbia

30 matches in Senior National Team of Serbia
