= Goran Škundrić =

Serbian volleyball player

Personal information
- Born: 23 November 1987 (age 38); Odžaci, SR Serbia, SFR Yugoslavia
- Height: 1.97 m (6 ft 6 in)
- Weight: 94 kg (207 lb)
- Spike: 340 cm (134 in)
- Block: 320 cm (126 in)

Volleyball information
- Position: Libero
- Current club: OK Novi Sad - Maneks, Sebia

Career
Years	Teams
–2011; 2011–2012; 2012–2014; 2014–2015; 2015–2016; 2016–	OK Vojvodina; Klek Srbijašume; MOK Djerdap Kladovo; Ribnica Kraljevo; C.V.M. Tomis Constanța; Tricolorul LMV Ploiesti

National team
Serbia
Honours
Representing Serbia
Men's volleyball
European Championship
Bronze medal – third place	2017 Poland

Goran Škundrić (born 23 November 1987) is a Serbian volleyball player, currently playing for Serbian club OK Novi Sad - Maneks.
