= Petar Čurović =

Montenegrin volleyball player (born 1984)

Personal information
- Full name: Petar Čurović
- Born: 1984 (age 41–42); Nikšić, SFR Yugoslavia
- Height: 1.98 m (6 ft 6 in)
- Weight: 91 kg (201 lb)
- Block: 327

Volleyball information
- Current club: NIS Vojvodina Novi Sad
- Number: 12

Petar Čurović is a volleyball player from Montenegro, currently playing for NIS Vojvodina Novi Sad.
