= Reza Abedini (volleyball) =

Iranian volleyball player (born 1991)

Personal information
- Nationality: Iranian
- Born: 19 May 1991 (age 35)
- Height: 203 cm (6 ft 8 in)
- Weight: 93 kg (205 lb)
- Spike: 354 cm (139 in)
- Block: 348 cm (137 in)

Volleyball information
- Number: 21 (national team)

Career
Years	Teams
2015	Vezarat Defa

National team
2015	Iran

Reza Abedini (Persian: رضا عابدینی; born 19 May 1991) is an Iranian male volleyball player. He is part of the Iran men's national volleyball team. On club level he plays for Vezarat Defa.
