= Božidar Vučićević =

Serbian volleyball player (born 1998)

Personal information
- Nationality: (Serbia) Serb
- Born: 9 December 1998 (age 27); Novi Sad, FR Yugoslavia
- Height: 2.05 m (6 ft 9 in)
- Weight: 96 kg (212 lb)
- Spike: 355 cm (140 in)
- Block: 335 cm (132 in)

Volleyball information
- Position: Opposite
- Current club: (Turkey) Spor Toto
- Number: 23

Career
Years	Teams
2016-2019; 2019-2021; 2021; 2021-2022; 2022-	(Serbia) OK Vojvodina (Slovenia) ACH Volley (South Korea) Cheonan Hyundai Capital Skywalkers (Turkey) Halkbank Ankara (Turkey) Spor Toto

National team
Serbia

Božidar Vučićević (Serbian Cyrillic: Божидар Вучићевић; born 9 December 1998) is a Serbian volleyball player who was a member of Slovenian club ACH Volley. Three–time Serbian Champion (2017, 2018, 2019).

He currently plays for Spor Toto, Turkish Efeler League Club

== Sporting achievements ==
=== Clubs ===
- CEV Challenge Cup
  - 2021/2022 – with Halkbank Ankara
- National championships
  - 2016/2017 Serbian Championship, with OK Vojvodina
  - 2017/2018 Serbian Championship, with OK Vojvodina
  - 2018/2019 Serbian Championship, with OK Vojvodina
  - 2019/2020 Slovenian Cup, with ACH Volley
