= Nikola Jovović =

Serbian volleyball player (born 1992)

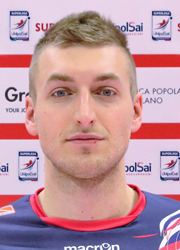

Personal information
- Born: 13 February 1992 (age 34); Novi Sad, SR Serbia, SFR Yugoslavia
- Height: 1.97 m (6 ft 6 in)
- Weight: 75 kg (165 lb)
- Spike: 335 cm (132 in)
- Block: 315 cm (124 in)

Volleyball information
- Position: Setter
- Current club: Verona Volley

Career
Years	Teams
2007–2011; 2011–2014; 2014–2017; 2017–2018; 2018–2019; 2019–2020; 2020–2021; 2021–2023; 2023–2024; 2024-2025-	Vojvodina Novi Sad; VfB Friedrichshafen; Volley Milano; Arkas İzmir; Ziraat Bankası Ankara; Ural Ufa; Spacer's de Toulouse; Dynamo LO; Verona Volley; NOVA Novokuybyshevsk

National team
2013–	Serbia
Honours
Men's volleyball
Representing Serbia
FIVB World League
Gold medal – first place	2016 Kraków
Silver medal – second place	2015 Rio de Janeiro
CEV European Championship
Gold medal – first place	2019 Belgium/France/Netherlands/Slovenia
Bronze medal – third place	2013 Denmark/Poland
Bronze medal – third place	2017 Poland

Nikola Jovović (Serbian Cyrillic: Никола Јововић; born 13 February 1992) is a Serbian professional volleyball player who plays as a setter for Verona Volley and the Serbia national team. He is the 2019 European Champion and the 2016 World League winner with Serbia.

== Career ==
=== National team ===
On 19 July 2015, Serbia, including Jovović, made it to the final of the 2015 World League, and eventually won silver medals, losing to France (0–3).

== Honours ==
=== Club ===
- Domestic
  - 2009–10 Serbian Cup, with Vojvodina Novi Sad
  - 2011–12 German Cup, with VfB Friedrichshafen
  - 2013–14 German Cup, with VfB Friedrichshafen

=== Youth national team ===
- 2009 CEV U19 European Championship
- 2009 FIVB U19 World Championship
- 2013 FIVB U23 World Championship

=== Individual awards ===
- 2009: CEV U19 European Championship – Best setter
- 2013: CEV European Championship – Fair play award
