= Miran Kujundžić =

Serbian volleyball player (born 1997)

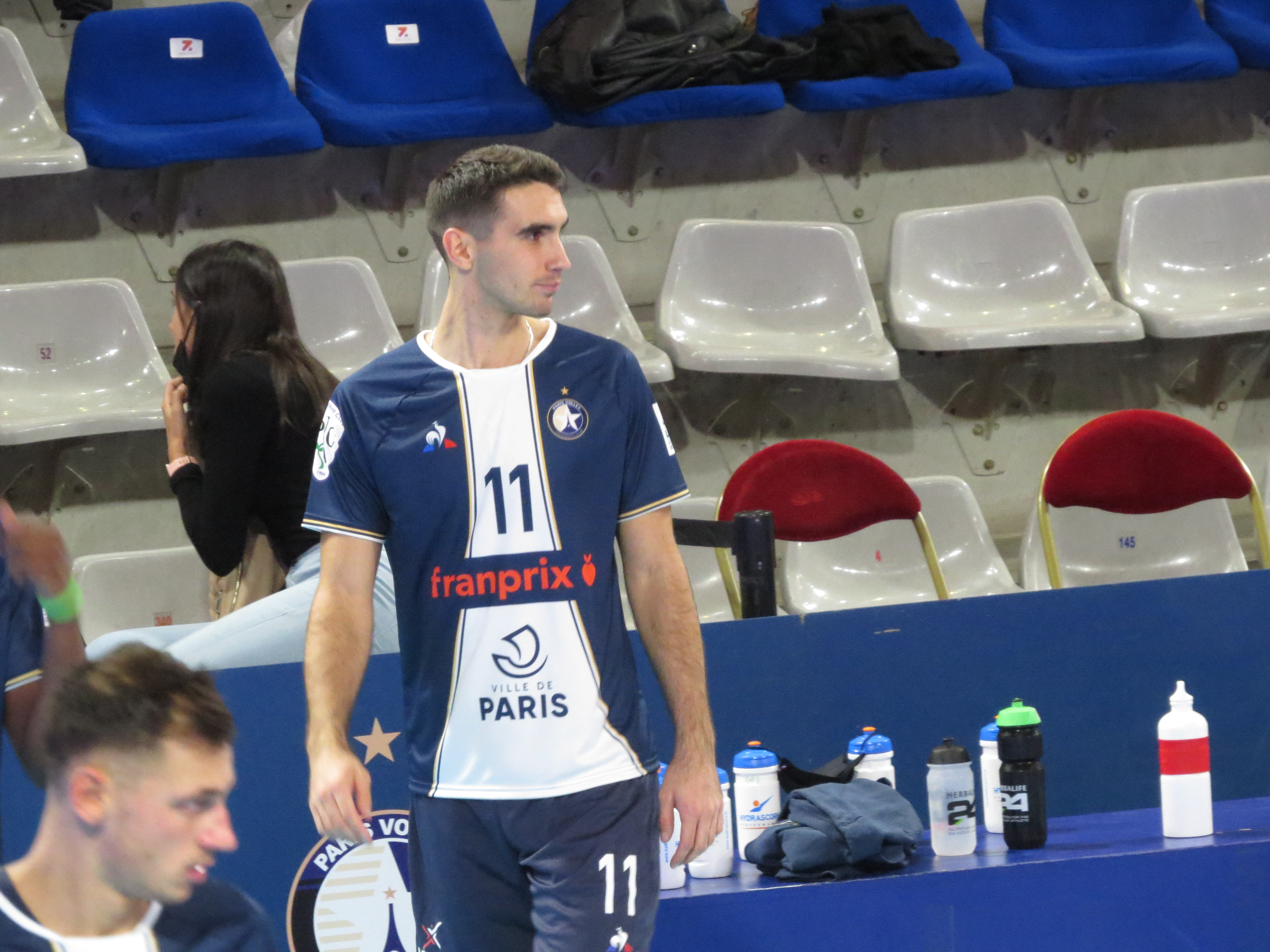
- Kujundžić as Paris Volley player in October 2020.

Personal information
- Born: 19 June 1997 (age 29); Subotica, Serbia, FR Yugoslavia
- Height: 1.96 m (6 ft 5 in)

Volleyball information
- Position: Outside hitter

Career
Years	Teams
2015–2019; 2019–2020; 2020–2022; 2022–2023; 2023–2024; 2024–2025; 2025–2026	Vojvodina Novi Sad; Tourcoing LM; Paris Volley; Ślepsk Suwałki; Galatasaray; Skra Bełchatów; Jastrzębski Węgiel

National team
2019–	Serbia

Miran Kujundžić (Serbian: Миран Кујунџић; born 19 June 1997) is a Serbian professional volleyball player who plays as an outside hitter for the Serbia national team. He represented his country in the 2022 World Championship.

== Club career ==
At the beginning of his senior career, Kujundžić played for Vojvodina Novi Sad in his native country, and won 3 national league titles in: 2017, 2018 and 2019, as well as one SuperCup in 2014.

In his first season abroad, he played in France for Tourcoing LM and in the next two seasons for Paris Volley.

For the 2022–23 season, he signed a contract with the Polish PlusLiga team, Ślepsk Malow Suwałki.

On 14 June 2023, he was announced as a new player of Galatasaray, one of the Turkish Men's Volleyball League teams.

== Honours ==
=== Club ===
- Domestic
  - 2014–15 Serbian SuperCup, with Vojvodina Novi Sad
  - 2016–17 Serbian Championship, with Vojvodina Novi Sad
  - 2017–18 Serbian Championship, with Vojvodina Novi Sad
  - 2018–19 Serbian Championship, with Vojvodina Novi Sad
