= David Mehić =

Serbian volleyball player (born 1997)

Personal information
- Nationality: (Serbia) Serbian
- Born: 24 September 1997 (age 29); Novi Sad, Serbia
- Height: 1.97 m (6 ft 6 in)
- Weight: 85 kg (187 lb)
- Spike: 345 cm (136 in)
- Block: 325 cm (128 in)

Volleyball information
- Position: Outside hitter
- Current club: OK Vojvodina
- Number: 24

Career
Years	Teams
2013–2019; 2019–2020; 2020; 2020–2021; 2021–	OK Vojvodina; Nice VB; OK Vojvodina; LUK Lublin; OK Vojvodina

David Mehić (Serbian Cyrillic: Давид Мехић; born 24 September 1997) is a Serbian professional volleyball player. At the professional club level, he plays for Vojvodina Novi Sad.

== Sporting achievements ==
=== Clubs ===
- National championships
  - 2014/2015 Serbian Cup, with OK Vojvodina
  - 2015/2016 Serbian SuperCup, with OK Vojvodina
  - 2016/2017 Serbian Championship, with OK Vojvodina
  - 2017/2018 Serbian Championship, with OK Vojvodina
  - 2018/2019 Serbian Championship, with OK Vojvodina
  - 2019/2020 Serbian Cup, with OK Vojvodina
  - 2021/2022 Serbian SuperCup, with OK Vojvodina
  - 2021/2022 Serbian Championship, with OK Vojvodina
