= Finance Palace =

Palace in Zrenjanin, Serbia

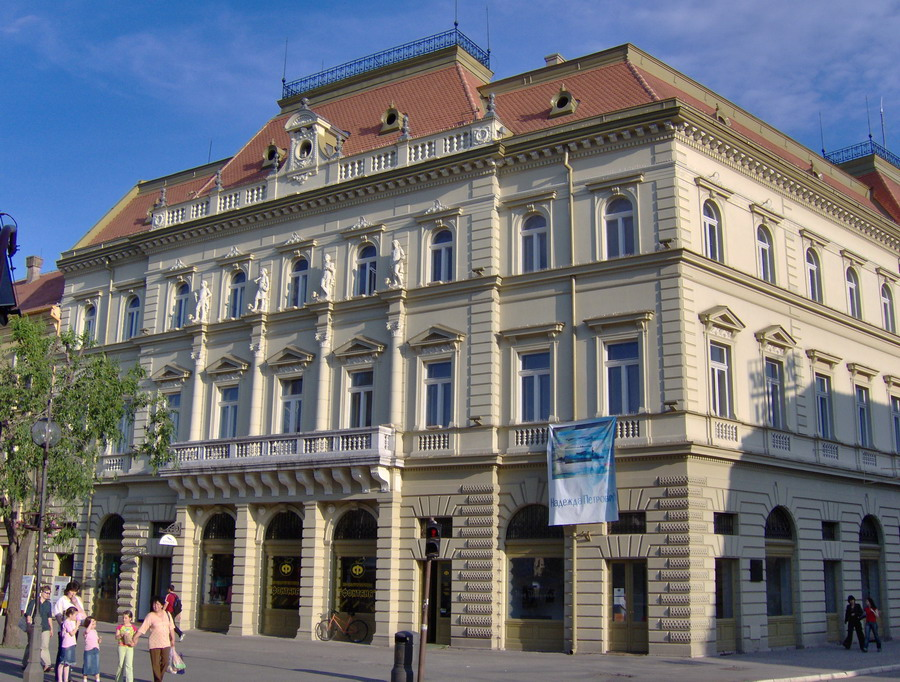
Main facade of the National museum

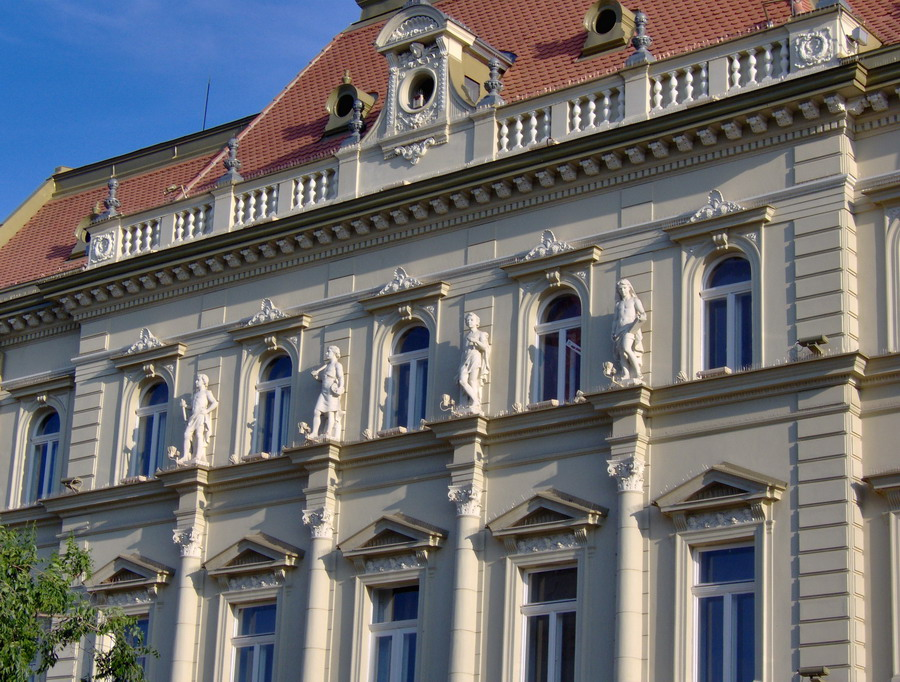
Statues at the facade depicting "Industry", "Agriculture", "Science" and "Merchantry"

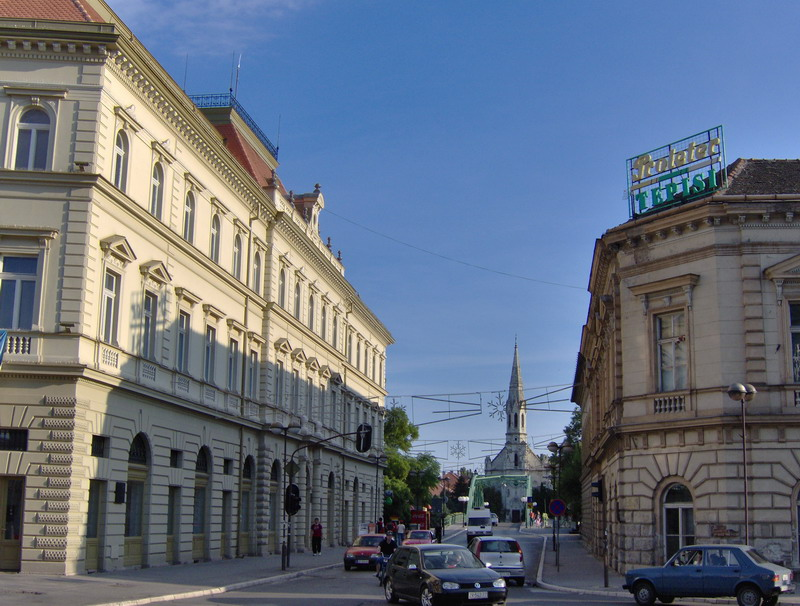
View at Subotićeva street and Finance palace. Small bridge and Protestant church are visible in the background

Finance palace, (Serbian Финансијска палата, Hungarian Pénzügyi Palota, German Finanz Palast) is a two-floored neo-renaissance palace on the main square in Zrenjanin, Serbia. The National Museum of Zrenjanin moved into it in 1966 and it is located next to the theatre building.

== History ==
City authorities chosen project for the building made by Hungarian architect István Kiss. Construction works started in 1893 and were finished in 1894. By his first choice, architect chosen facade towards Begej to be building's main facade. However, he later changed plan and choose square facade to be the most impressive facade of the building. The most remarkable detail of this building are, there is no doubt, four statues on its main facade, depicting "Industry", "Agriculture", "Science" and "Merchantry". Main facade also has a balcony on the first floor. The building has shops at the ground floor and an exhibition gallery.

== National museum ==
The National Museum of Zrenjanin was established in 1906 as The Museum of Torontal District, according to the decision of The Municipal Board and on the initiative of The Cultural Association of Torontal District. However, on the basis of all the available sources, the Museum did not start its activities until 1911. This delay was caused by some financial reasons as well as by the lack of an adequate building. The Museum got its first rooms in The District Hall and was functioning in this building under the name “The Museum of Torontal District” until 1918 when it temporarily stopped its activities. After the First World War, The Museum was first moved into the complex of The Piaristic Monastery and then to the first floor of “The Casino”, but because of the bad accommodation conditions, it was practically closed to the public. On the verge of the Second World War, The Museum had the name “The Museum of the Danube Regional Unit” and the attempt of The Historical Society of Novi Sad, to put it in order and open it for visits, was stopped by the war. During the occupation, from 1941 to 1944, The Museum was open for the public for a short period of time as “The Museum of Banat District”. After the liberation, the Museum moved to different locations several times and only the third location was accepted as the permanent solution: that was the building of the former Financial Palace. It is located in Subotićeva street 1.

== Today ==
The Finance Palace has been a national museum building since 1966. It has a large number of exhibits from the pre-historic age to the 20th century. It is divided into the following departments: Archeology, Ethnology, Nature, History and Art. Since August 2005 museum has a modern gallery on the ground floor in which are held many exhibitions.
