= OK Vojvodina =

Vojvodina NS Seme Novi Sad
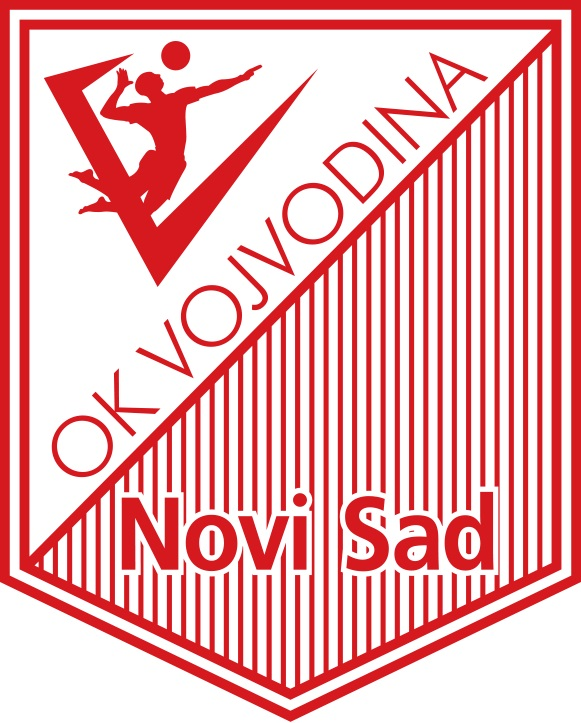
- Full name: Odbojkaški klub Vojvodina
- Short name: OK Vojvodina
- Nickname: Voša
- Founded: 1946
- Ground: SPENS, Novi Sad (Capacity: 6,987–Main Hall, 1,030–Small Hall)
- Manager: Slobodan Boškan
- League: Wiener Städtische League
- Website: Club home page

Uniforms
Home	Away

Odbojkaški klub Vojvodina (English: Volleyball Club Vojvodina) is a professional volleyball team based in Novi Sad, Serbia. It plays in the Wiener Städtische League.

== Honours and achievements ==
National Championships – 19

- Champion of Yugoslavia (2):
  - 1987–88, 1988–89
- Runners up (5): 1980/81, 1982/83, 1985/86, 1986/87, 1990/91
- Champion of Serbia and Montenegro (10):
  - 1991–92, 1992–93, 1993–94, 1994–95, 1995–96, 1996–97, 1997–98, 1998–99, 1999-00, 2003–04
- Runners up (3): 2001/02, 2004/05, 2005/06
- Champion of Serbia (7):
  - 2006–07, 2016/17, 2017/18, 2018/19, 2019/20, 2020/21, 2021/22
- Runners up (6): 2008/09, 2010/11, 2011/12, 2013/14, 2015/16, 2022/23

National Cups – 16

- Yugoslav Cup (2):
  - 1977, 1987
- Runners up (5): 1981, 1986, 1988, 1990, 1991
- Serbia and Montenegro Cup (8):
  - 1991/92, 1993/94, 1994/95, 1995/96, 1997/98, 2002/03, 2003/04, 2004/05
- Runners up (2): 1992/93, 2000/01
- Serbian cup (6):
  - 2006/07, 2009/10, 2011/12, 2014/15, 2019/20, 2024
- Runners up (2): 2016/17, 2022/23

National Super Cups – 6

- Serbia and Montenegro Super cup (1):
  - 1993
- Serbian Super cup (5):
  - 2015, 2019, 2020, 2021
- Runners up (4): 2012, 2017, 2018, 2022, 2023

=== International ===
- CEV Champions League:
  - Bronze medal (x2): 1988/89, 1995/96
- CEV Cup:
  - Semi finalist (x2) Bronze medal (x1): 1982/83, 2005/06
- CEV Challenge Cup:
  - Winner (x1): 2014/15

== Team roster–season 2019/2020 ==
Name	Nationality
1 Stevan Simić	Serbia
3 Nikola Lakčević (libero)	Montenegro
4 Lazar Bajandić	Serbia
5 Boško Bojičić	Serbia
6 Filip Kovačević	Serbia
7 Stefan Negić (libero)	Serbia
8 Nemanja Mašulović	Serbia
11 Boris Buša	Serbia
12 Aleksandar Bošnjak	Serbia
13 Aleksandar Blagojević	Serbia
14 Neđeljko Radović	Montenegro
16 Vuk Todorović	Serbia
17 Andrej Rudić	Serbia
18 Pavle Perić	Serbia
45 Miloš Nikić	Serbia

Coach: Siniša Gavrančić Serbia

More notable players

- Borislav Otić
- Vojislav Nikolajević
- Miomir Đurić
- Milan Basarić
- Petar Bilanić
- Petar Kulešević
- Branko Gvozdenović
- Predrag Mihić
- Slobodan Janjetović
- Zlatoje Vasilijević
- Aleksandar Milovanović
- Nikola Marić
- Mihal Potran
- Slobodan Galešev
- Branislav Terzin
- Simo Višekruna
- Dragan Nišić
- Predrag Suša
- Slavko Bogdan
- Predrag Maoduš
- Danilo Bijelić
- Žarko Petrović
- Radovan Dabić
- Uroš Ribarić
- Milan Marić
- Velibor Ivanović
- Pero Stanić
- Dragan Klašnić
- Branislav Dobrodolski
- Zoran Nikolić
- Slobodan Košutić
- Đuro Bašić
- Dragan Vermezović
- Vladimir Grbić
- Slobodan Kovač
- Ekrem Lagumdžija
- Strahinja Kozić
- Nikola Salatić
- Siniša Reljić
- Nikola Grbić
- Đula Mešter
- Vasa Mijić
- Đorđe Đurić
- Dragan Svetozarević
- Edin Škorić
- Andrija Gerić
- Slobodan Boškan
- Vladimir Batez
- Marko Podraščanin
- Marko Ivović
- Dušan Tojagić
- Konstantin Čupković
- Branislav Đurić
- Goran Ćato
- Goran Marić
- Miloš Vemić
- Borislav Petrović
- Marko Samardžić
- Branko Roljić
- Dražen Luburić
- Gabrijel Radić
- Veljko Petković
- Dejan Bojović
- Aleksandar Minić
- Nikola Jovović
- Milan Katić
- Petar Čurović
- Goran Škundrić
- Petar Premović
- David Mehić
- Stefan Basta
- Miran Kujundžić
- Stevan Simić
- Čedomir Stanković
- Nikola Peković
- Vukašin Todorović
- Luka Čubrilo
- Milan Jurišić
- Danilo Mirosavljević
- Milija Mrdak
- Nenad Simeunović
- Nemanja Čubrilo
- Stefan Kovačević
- Aleksandar Veselinović
- Pavle Perić
- Nedjeljko Radović
- Božidar Vučićević
- Lazar Ilinčić
- Milorad Kapur

Notable former coaches

- Nebojša Ninkov
- Darko Kalajdžić
- Dušan Višekruna
- Leszek Dorosz
- Zoran Gajić
- Nikola Salatić
- Radovan Dabić
- Milorad Kijac
- Strahinja Kozić
- Nedžad Osmankač
