= 2023 Memorial of Hubert Jerzy Wagner squads =

This article shows the rosters of all participating teams at the 2023 Memorial of Hubert Jerzy Wagner in Kraków, Poland.

== France ==
The following is the France's roster in the 2023 Memorial of Hubert Jerzy Wagner.

Head coach: (Italy) Andrea Giani

- 1 Barthélémy Chinenyeze MB
- 2 Jenia Grebennikov L
- 4 Jean Patry OP
- 6 Benjamin Toniutti S
- 7 Kévin Tillie OH
- 11 Antoine Brizard S
- 12 Stéphen Boyer OP
- 14 Nicolas Le Goff MB
- 16 Daryl Bultor MB
- 17 Trevor Clevenot OH
- 19 Benjamin Diez L
- 23 Timothée Carle OH
- 25 Quentin Jouffroy MB

== Italy ==
The following is Italy's roster in the 2023 Memorial of Hubert Jerzy Wagner.

Head coach: (Italy) Ferdinando De Giorgi

- 2 Paolo Porro S
- 3 Marco Falaschi S
- 5 Alessandro Michieletto OH
- 6 Simone Giannelli S
- 7 Fabio Balaso L
- 8 Riccardo Sbertoli S
- 9 Francesco Recine OH
- 10 Leonardo Scanferla L
- 11 Davide Gardini OH
- 12 Mattia Bottolo OH
- 13 Lorenzo Cortesia MB
- 14 Gianluca Galassi MB
- 15 Daniele Lavia OH
- 16 Yuri Romanò OP
- 18 Fabrizio Gironi OH
- 19 Roberto Russo MB
- 20 Tommaso Rinaldi OH
- 21 Alessandro Piccinelli L
- 25 Marco Vitelli MB
- 28 Giovanni Sanguinetti MB
- 30 Leandro Mosca MB
- 31 Lorenzo Sala OH

== Poland ==
The following is Poland's roster in the 2023 Memorial of Hubert Jerzy Wagner.

Head coach: (Serbia) Nikola Grbić

- 2 Jakub Szymański OH
- 3 Jakub Popiwczak L
- 5 Łukasz Kaczmarek OP
- 6 Bartosz Kurek OP
- 7 Karol Kłos MB
- 9 Wilfredo Leon OH
- 10 Bartosz Bednorz OH
- 11 Aleksander Śliwka OH
- 12 Grzegorz Łomacz S
- 15 Jakub Kochanowski MB
- 16 Kamil Semeniuk OH
- 17 Paweł Zatorski L
- 19 Marcin Janusz S
- 20 Mateusz Bieniek MB
- 21 Tomasz Fornal OH
- 22 Karol Urbanowicz MB
- 23 Karol Butryn OP
- 24 Kamil Szymura L
- 25 Artur Szalpuk OH
- 41 Jakub Hawryluk L
- 44 Kuba Hawryluk L
- 55 Mikołaj Sawicki OH
- 72 Mateusz Poręba MB
- 96 Jan Firlej S
- 99 Norbert Huber MB

== Slovenia ==
The following is Slovenia's roster in the 2023 Memorial of Hubert Jerzy Wagner.

Head coach: (Romania) Gheorghe Crețu

- 2 Alen Pajenk MB
- 3 Uroš Planinšič S
- 4 Jan Kozamernik MB
- 5 Matej Kök OH
- 6 Urban Toman L
- 8 Rok Bračko OH
- 10 Sašo Štalekar MB
- 11 Danijel Koncilja MB
- 13 Jani Kovačič L
- 14 Žiga Štern OH
- 16 Gregor Ropret S
- 17 Tine Urnaut OH
- 18 Klemen Čebulj OH
- 19 Rok Možič OH
