= 2023 Memorial of Hubert Jerzy Wagner =

Volleyball tournament

Tournament details
- Host country: Poland
- Dates: 18–20 August 2023
- Teams: 4
- Venue: 1 (in 1 host city)

Final positions
- Champions: Italy (2nd title)
- Runners-up: Slovenia
- Third place: Poland
- Fourth place: France

Tournament awards
- MVP: (Italy) Simone Giannelli
- Best Setter: (Italy) Simone Giannelli
- Best OH: (Slovenia) Rok Možič
- Best MB: (Slovenia) Jan Kozamernik
- Best OPP: (Italy) Alessandro Michieletto
- Best Libero: (Poland) Paweł Zatorski

The XX Memorial of Hubert Jerzy Wagner was a volleyball tournament held at Tauron Arena in Kraków, Poland from 18 to 20 August 2023. As in the previous editions, four teams participated, including 2023 Volleyball Nations League gold medalist Poland, 2020 Olympic gold medalist and 2022 Volleyball Nations League winner France, 2022 FIVB Volleyball Men's World Championship gold medalist Italy, and two-time (2019, 2021 EuroVolley) silver medalist Slovenia. This year's tournament was held a week before the 2023 EuroVolley.

== Participating teams ==
Team	Appearance			Best performance
Team	Last	Total	Streak	Best performance
Poland	2022	20	19	10× Champions (2006, 2008, 2009, 2012, 2013, 2015, 2017, 2018, 2021, 2022)
Italy	2011	4	1	1× Champions (2011)
France	2018	4	2	1x Runner-up (2017)
Slovenia	N/A	1	0	debut (2023)

== Qualification ==
All teams except the host must have received an invitation from the organizers.

Africa (CAVB)	Asia and Oceania (AVC)	Europe (CEV)	North, Central America and Caribbean (NORCECA)	South America (CSV)
		Host nation: Poland; Wild card: Italy; France; Slovenia		

== Venue ==
Kraków, Poland
Tauron Arena
Capacity: 15,328
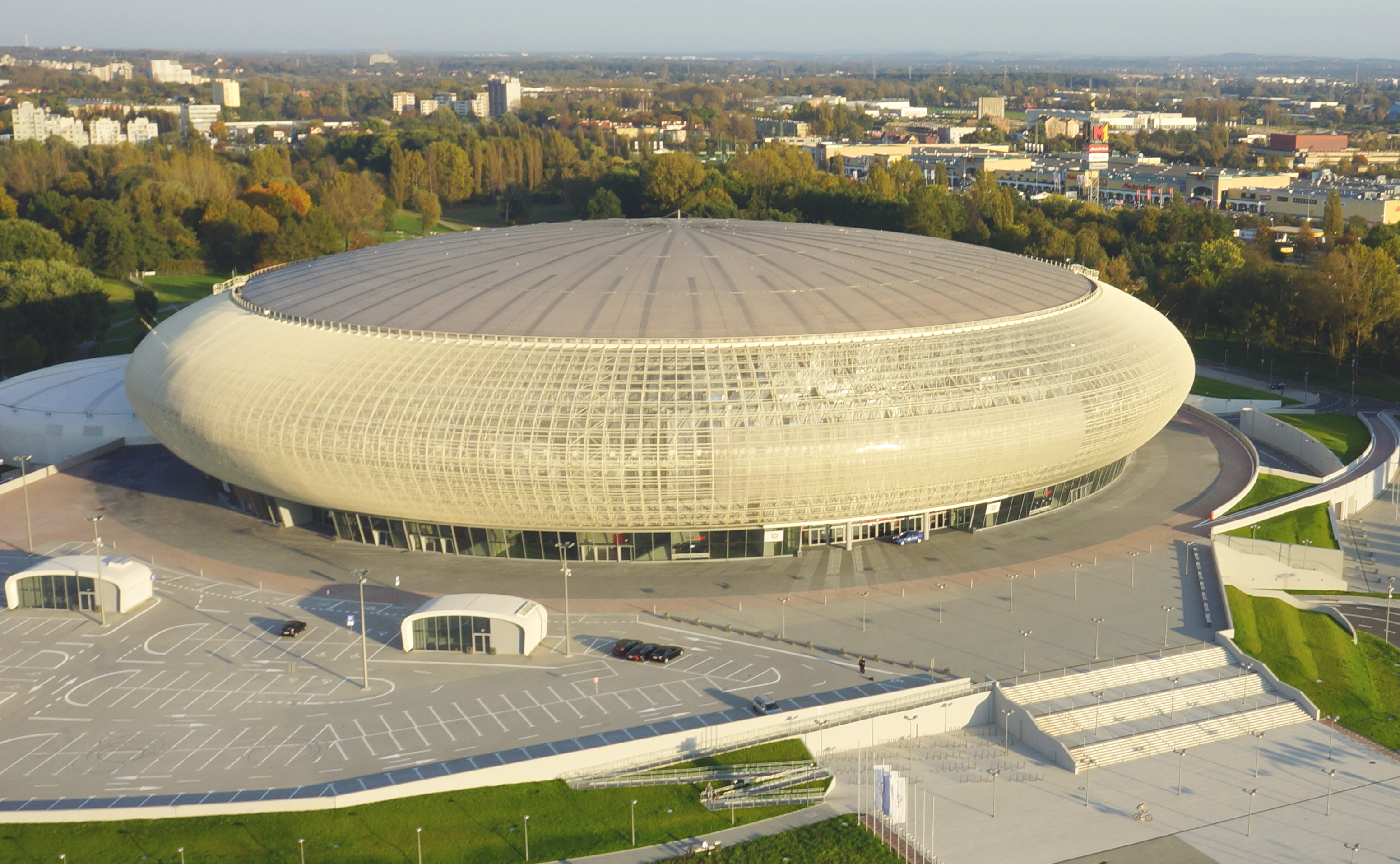

== Pool standing procedure ==
1. Number of matches won
2. Match points
3. Sets ratio
4. Points ratio
5. If the tie continues as per the point ratio between two teams, the priority will be given to the team which won the match between them. When the tie in points ratio is between three or more teams, a new classification of these teams in the terms of points 1, 2, 3 and 4 will be made taking into consideration only the matches in which they were opposed to each other.

Match won 3–0 or 3–1: 3 match points for the winner, 0 match points for the loser
Match won 3–2: 2 match points for the winner, 1 match point for the loser

== Results ==
All times are local Central European Summer Time (UTC+2).

=== Ranking ===
Pos	Team	Pld	W	L	Pts	SW	SL	SR	SPW	SPL	SPR
1	Italy	3	2	1	7	8	4	2.000	290	267	1.086
2	Slovenia	3	2	1	5	7	5	1.400	277	266	1.041
3	Poland	3	1	2	3	4	7	0.571	245	257	0.953
4	France	3	1	2	3	4	7	0.571	245	267	0.918

Source: Flashscore

Date	Time		Score		Set 1	Set 2	Set 3	Set 4	Set 5	Total	Report
18 Aug	17:30	Poland	0–3	Slovenia	21–25	18–25	21–25			60–75	Report
18 Aug	20:00	Italy	3–0	France	29–27	25–21	25–20			79–68	Report
19 Aug	14:00	Slovenia	3–2	Italy	20–25	25–19	25–23	21–25	25–23	116–115	Report
19 Aug	17:00	Poland	3–1	France	27–29	25–16	25–21	25–20		102–86	Report
20 Aug	14:00	France	3–1	Slovenia	16–25	25–19	25–22	25–20		91–86	Report
20 Aug	17:00	Poland	1–3	Italy	18–25	23–25	25–21	17–25		83–96	Report

== Final standing ==
Rank	Team
1st place, gold medalist(s)	Italy
2nd place, silver medalist(s)	Slovenia
3rd place, bronze medalist(s)	Poland
4	France

2023 Memorial of Hubert Jerzy Wagner winners

Italy
Second title

Alessandro Michieletto, Simone Giannelli, Fabio Balaso, Riccardo Sbertoli, Leonardo Scanferla, Mattia Bottolo, Gianluca Galassi, Daniele Lavia, Yuri Romanò, Fabrizio Gironi, Roberto Russo, Tommaso Rinaldi, Giovanni Sanguinetti, Leandro Mosca
Head coach
Ferdinando De Giorgi

== Awards ==
- Most valuable player
  (Italy) Simone Giannelli
- Best setter
  (Italy) Simone Giannelli
- Best receiver
  (Slovenia) Rok Možič
- Best blocker
  (Slovenia) Jan Kozamernik
- Best spiker
  (Italy) Alessandro Michieletto
- Best libero
  (Poland) Paweł Zatorski
