= Simone Giannelli =

Italian volleyball player (born 1996)

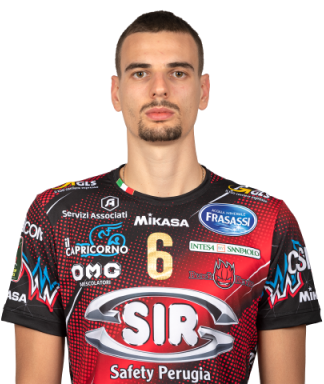
- Giannelli in 2022

Personal information
- Nickname: the italian maestro
- Born: 9 August 1996 (age 30); Bolzano, Italy
- Height: 2.00 m (6 ft 7 in)
- Weight: 89 kg (196 lb)
- Spike: 352 cm (139 in)
- Block: 330 cm (130 in)

Volleyball information
- Position: Setter
- Current club: Sir Safety Perugia
- Number: 6

Career
Years
- 2012–2021
- 2021–
Teams
- Diatec Trentino
- Sir Safety Perugia

National team
2015–	Italy
Honours
Men's volleyball
Representing Italy
Olympic Games
Olympic Games
Silver medal – second place	2016 Rio de Janeiro	Team
FIVB World Championship
Gold medal – first place	2022 Poland/Slovenia
Gold medal – first place	2025 Philippines
FIVB Nations League
Silver medal – second place	2025 Ningbo
World Cup
Silver medal – second place	2015 Japan
World Grand Champions Cup
Silver medal – second place	2017 Japan
European Championship
Gold medal – first place	2021 Poland/Czechia/Estonia/Finland
Silver medal – second place	2023 Italy/Bulgaria/North Macedonia/Israel
Bronze medal – third place	2015 Bulgaria/Italy
- Last updated: 17 September 2017

Simone Giannelli (born 9 August 1996) is an Italian volleyball player who plays as a setter for and captains both Lega Pallavolo Serie A club Sir Safety Perugia and the Italy national team.

He is silver medalist of the 2016 Summer Olympics, back-to-back gold medalist of the FIVB Volleyball Men’s World Championship in 2022 and 2025, gold medalist of the 2021 Men's European Volleyball Championship, silver medalist of the 2015 World Cup and of the 2025 FIVB Men’s Volleyball Nations league.

== Career ==
Giannelli had proved himself as an up-and-coming star within volleyball by winning the Finals MVP award in the 2014-15 season with Trentino Volley in the Italian Volleyball League after defeating Modena Volley. He then followed the trend up by taking the starting 7 in the national team, despite competition by players such as Dragan Travica, Michele Baranowicz, and Marco Falaschi.

In his first year in the national team, Giannelli won a silver medal at the 2015 FIVB Volleyball Men's World Cup and a bronze medal at the 2015 Men's European Volleyball Championship, where he was also awarded the prize for best setter, the youngest in the history of the tournament.

Giannelli is the only player to have earned an MVP award at both an FIVB World Championship and an FIVB Club World Championship.

== Honours ==
=== Clubs ===
==== CEV Champions League ====
- 2015–16, with Trentino Diatec
- 2020–21, with Trentino Itas
- 2024–25, with Sir Sicoma Monini Perugia
- 2025–26, with Sir Sicoma Monini Perugia

==== FIVB Club World Championship ====
- 2018, with Trentino Volley
- 2022, with Sir Safety Susa Perugia
- 2023, with Sir Sicoma Perugia
- 2025, with Sir Sicoma Perugia

==== CEV Cup ====
- 2019, with Trentino Diatec

==== Other international competitions ====
- 2024 Bogdanka Volley Cup, with Sir Susa Vim Perugia

==== National championships ====
- 2011–12 Italian Championship, with Diatec Trentino
- 2012–13 Italian Cup, with Itas Diatec Trentino
- 2012–13 Italian Championship, with Itas Diatec Trentino
- 2013–14 Italian Super Cup, with Diatec Trentino
- 2014–15 Italian Championship, with Energy T.I. Diatec Trentino
- 2015–16 Italian Championship, with Diatec Trentino
- 2016–17 Italian Championship, with Diatec Trentino
- 2017–18 Italian Championship, with Diatec Trentino
- 2018–19 Italian Championship, with Diatec Trentino
- 2020–21 Italian Championship, with Diatec Trentino
- 2021–22 Italian Cup, with Sir Safety Perugia
- 2021–22 Italian Championship, with Sir Safety Perugia
- 2022–23 Italian Super Cup, with Sir Safety Perugia
- 2023–24 Italian Super Cup, with Sir Susa Perugia
- 2023–24 Italian Cup, with Sir Susa Perugia
- 2023–24 Italian Championship, with Sir Susa Perugia
- 2024–25 Italian Super Cup, with Sir Susa Perugia
- 2024–25 Italian Championship, with Sir Susa Perugia
- 2025–26 Italian Super Cup, with Sir Susa Perugia
- 2025–26 Italian Championship, with Sir Susa Perugia

=== National team ===
- 2015 CEV European Championship
- 2015 FIVB World Cup
- 2016 Olympic Games
- 2017 FIVB World Grand Champions Cup
- 2021 CEV European Championship
- 2022 FIVB World Championship
- 2023 Memorial of Hubert Jerzy Wagner
- 2023 CEV European Championship
- 2025 FIVB Nations League
- 2025 FIVB World Championship

=== Individual ===
- 2012 Italian Trofeo Delle Regioni U19 – Most Valuable Player
- 2015 Italian Superlega Serie A1 – Most Valuable Player
- 2015 CEV European Championship – Best Setter
- 2016 CEV Champions League – Best Setter
- 2016 FIVB World League – Best Setter
- 2016 FIVB Club World Championship – Best Setter
- 2017 FIVB World Grand Champions Cup – Best Setter
- 2018 FIVB Club World Championship – Best Setter
- 2021 European Championship – Most Valuable Player
- 2022 FIVB World Championship – Most Valuable Player
- 2022 FIVB World Championship – Best Setter
- 2022 FIVB Club World Championship – Most Valuable Player
- 2022 FIVB Club World Championship – Best Setter
- 2023 Memorial of Hubert Jerzy Wagner – Most Valuable Player
- 2023 Memorial of Hubert Jerzy Wagner – Best Setter
- 2023 FIVB Club World Championship – Best Setter
- 2024 Italian Superlega Serie A1 – Most Valuable Player
- 2024 Bogdanka Volley Cup – Best Setter
- 2025 CEV Champions League – Best Setter
- 2025 CEV Champions League – Most Valuable Player
- 2025 FIVB Nations League – Best Setter
- 2025 FIVB World Championship – Best Setter
- 2025 FIVB Club World Championship – Best Setter
- 2025 FIVB Club World Championship – Most Valuable Player
- 2026 CEV Champions League – Best Setter

Awards
Preceded by (Russia) Sergey Grankin	Best Setter of CEV European Championship; 2015	Succeeded by (Russia) Sergey Grankin
Preceded by (Poland) Fabian Drzyzga	Best Setter of CEV Champions League; 2015/2016	Succeeded by (Argentina) Luciano De Cecco
Preceded by (France) Benjamin Toniutti	Best Setter of FIVB World League; 2016	Succeeded by (France) Benjamin Toniutti
Preceded by (Brazil) William Arjona	Best Setter of FIVB Club World Championship; 2016	Succeeded by (Russia) Aleksandr Butko
Preceded by (Brazil) Bruno Rezende	Best Setter of World Grand Champions Cup; 2017	Succeeded by Incumbent
Preceded by (Serbia) Uroš Kovačević	Most Valuable Player of CEV European Championship; 2021	Succeeded by (Poland) Wilfredo León
Preceded by (Poland) Bartosz Kurek	Most Valuable Player of FIVB World Championship; 2022	Succeeded by (Italy) Alessandro Michieletto
Preceded by (Italy) Simone Giannelli	Best Setter of FIVB World Championship; 2025	Succeeded by Incumbent
