= Bartosz Kurek =

Polish volleyball player (born 1988)

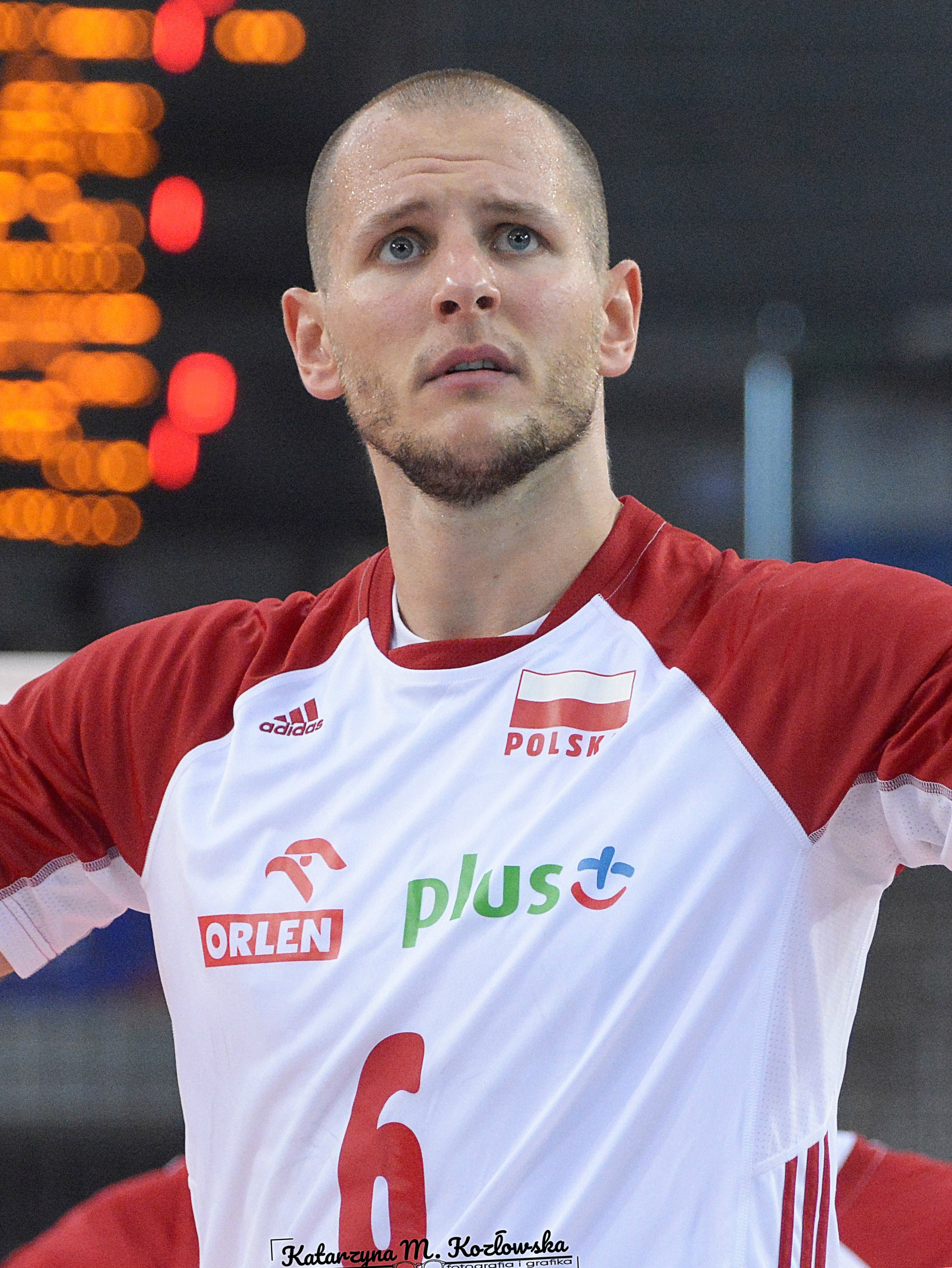
- Kurek in 2018

Personal information
- Full name: Bartosz Kamil Kurek
- Nickname: Kuraś
- Born: 29 August 1988 (age 38) Wałbrzych, Poland
- Height: 2.07 m (6 ft 9 in)
- Weight: 109 kg (240 lb)
- Spike: 370 cm (146 in)
- Block: 340 cm (134 in)

Volleyball information
- Position: Opposite / Outside hitter
- Current club: Tokyo Great Bears
- Number: 1

Career
- Years: Team
- 2004–2005 2005–2008 2008–2012 2012–2013 2013–2015 2015–2016 2016–2017 2017–2018 2018 2018–2019 2019–2020 2020–2024 2024–2025 2025–: Stal Nysa; ZAKSA Kędzierzyn-Koźle; Skra Bełchatów; Dynamo Moscow; Volley Lube; Asseco Resovia; Skra Bełchatów; Ziraat Bankası Ankara; Stocznia Szczecin; Onico Warsaw; Vero Volley Monza; Wolfdogs Nagoya; ZAKSA Kędzierzyn-Koźle; Tokyo Great Bears

National team
- Years: Team
- 2007–: Poland
Honours
Men's volleyball
Representing Poland
Olympic Games
Silver medal – second place	2024 Paris	Team
FIVB World Championship
Gold medal – first place	2018 Bulgaria/Italy
Silver medal – second place	2022 Poland/Slovenia
Bronze medal – third place	2025 Philippines
FIVB World Cup
Silver medal – second place	2011 Japan
Bronze medal – third place	2015 Japan
FIVB World League
Gold medal – first place	2012 Sofia
Bronze medal – third place	2011 Gdańsk
FIVB Nations League
Gold medal – first place	2023 Gdańsk
Silver medal – second place	2021 Rimini
Bronze medal – third place	2022 Bologna
Bronze medal – third place	2024 Łódź
CEV European Championship
Gold medal – first place	2009 Turkey
Gold medal – first place	2023 Italy/Bulgaria/North Macedonia/Israel
Bronze medal – third place	2011 Austria/Czech Republic
Bronze medal – third place	2021 Poland/Czechia/Estonia/Finland

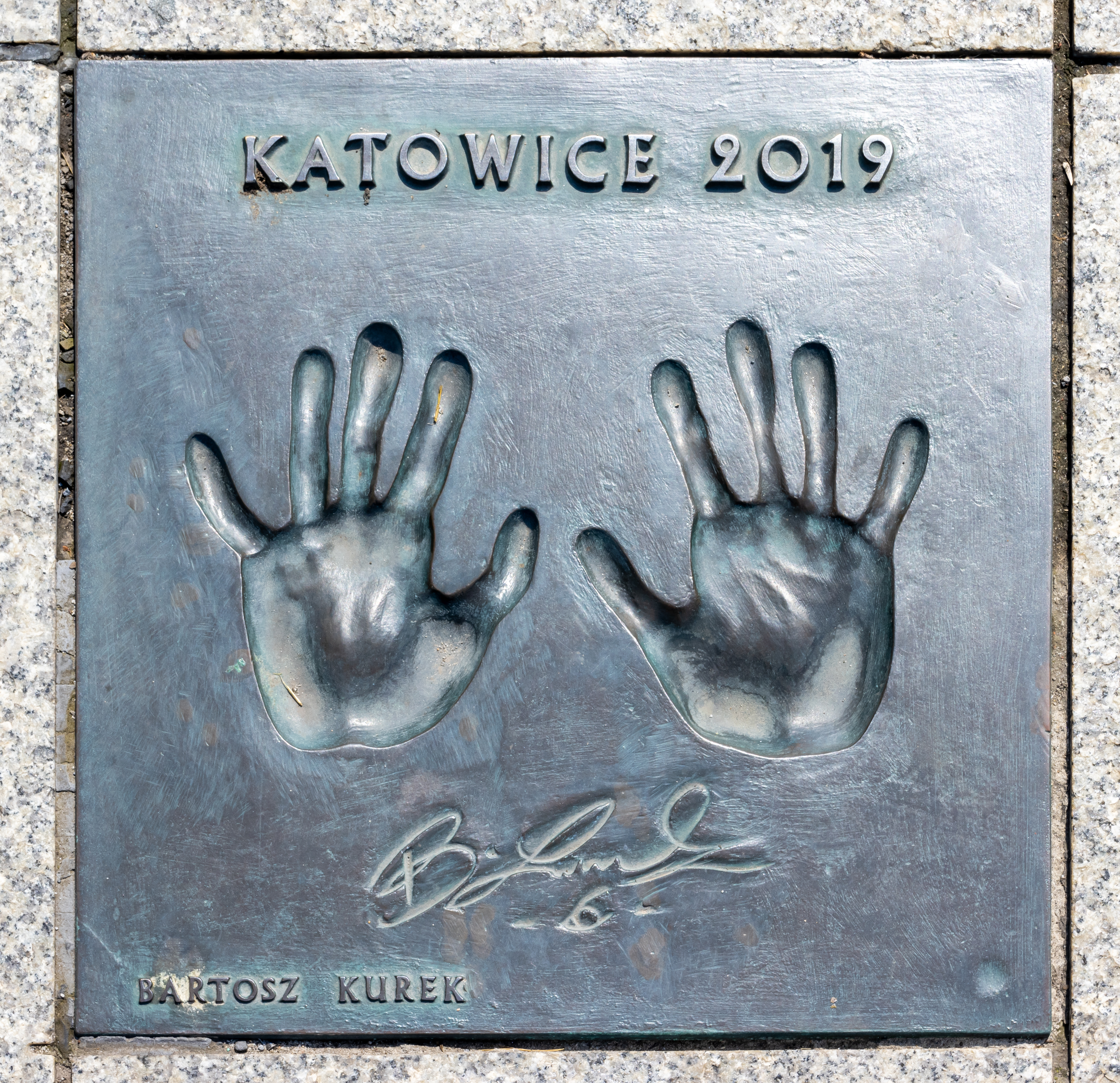
Hand prints and signature at the Avenue of Volleyball Stars, Katowice

Bartosz Kamil Kurek (born 29 August 1988) is a Polish professional volleyball player who plays as an opposite spiker for Tokyo Great Bears and captains the Poland national team. Kurek took part in 4 Olympic Games (London 2012, Rio 2016, Tokyo 2020, Paris 2024) winning silver medal in Paris. He also won the 2018 World Champion title, as well as the 2009 and the 2023 European Champion titles. In 2019, he became the first ever volleyball player to be voted the Polish Sports Personality of the Year.

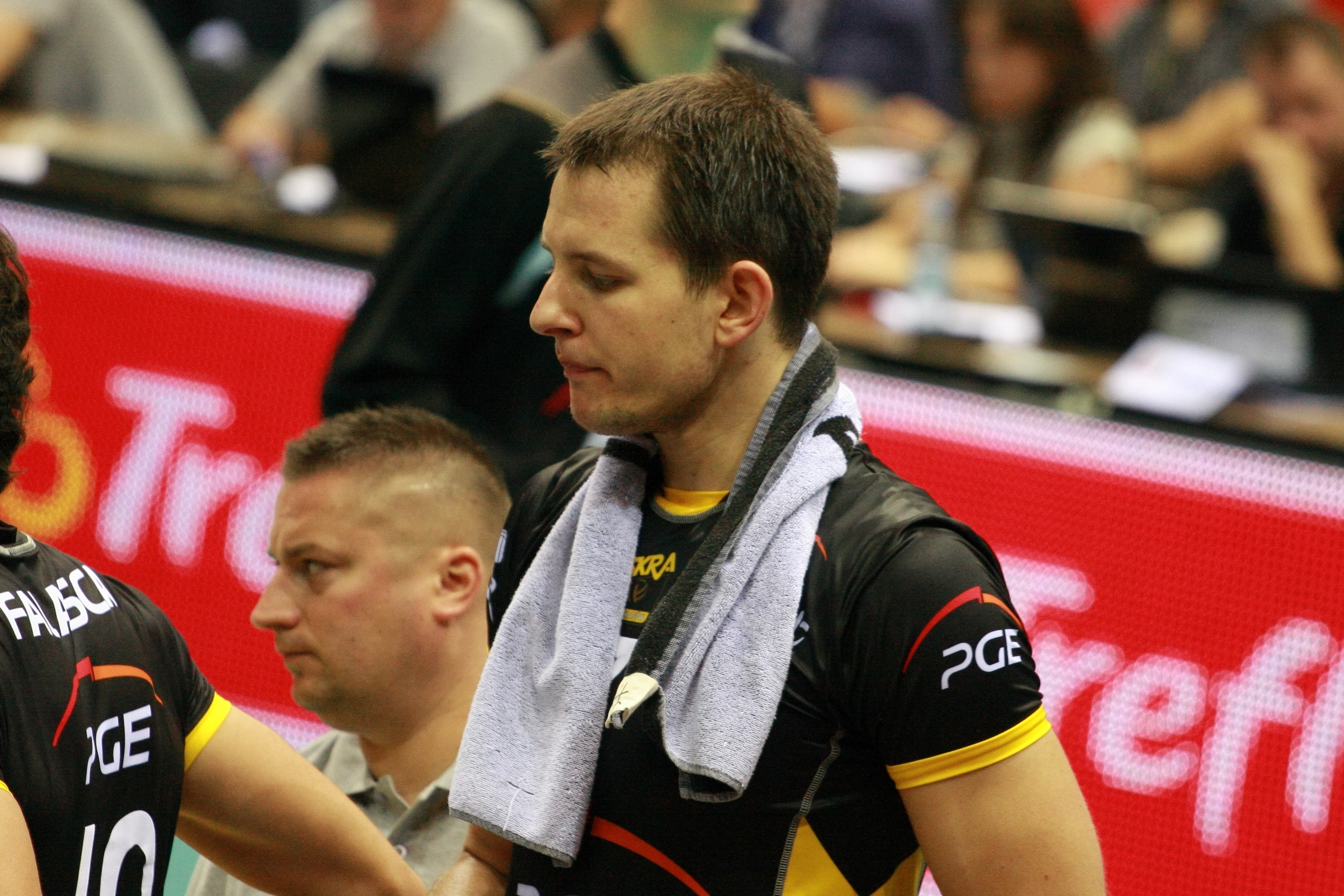
On 30 September 2011, during the PGE Skra Bełchatów 3:1 LOTOS Trefl Gdańsk match at Ergo Arena, Gdańsk in the 2011–12 PlusLiga season.

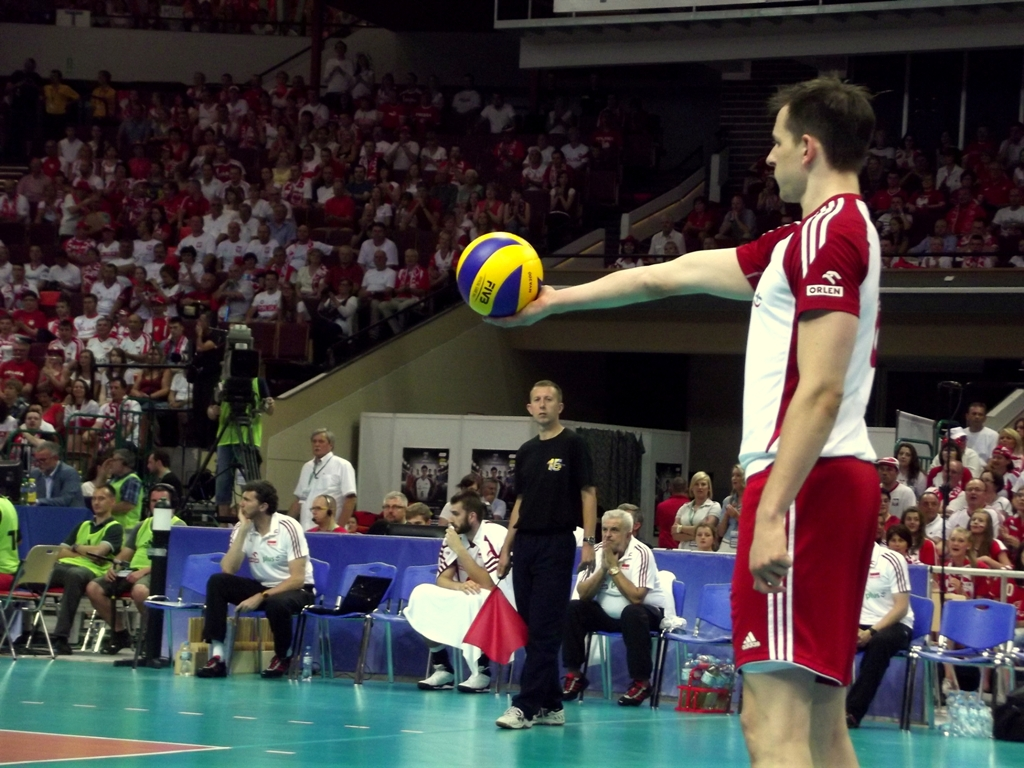
Bartosz Kurek in 2013.

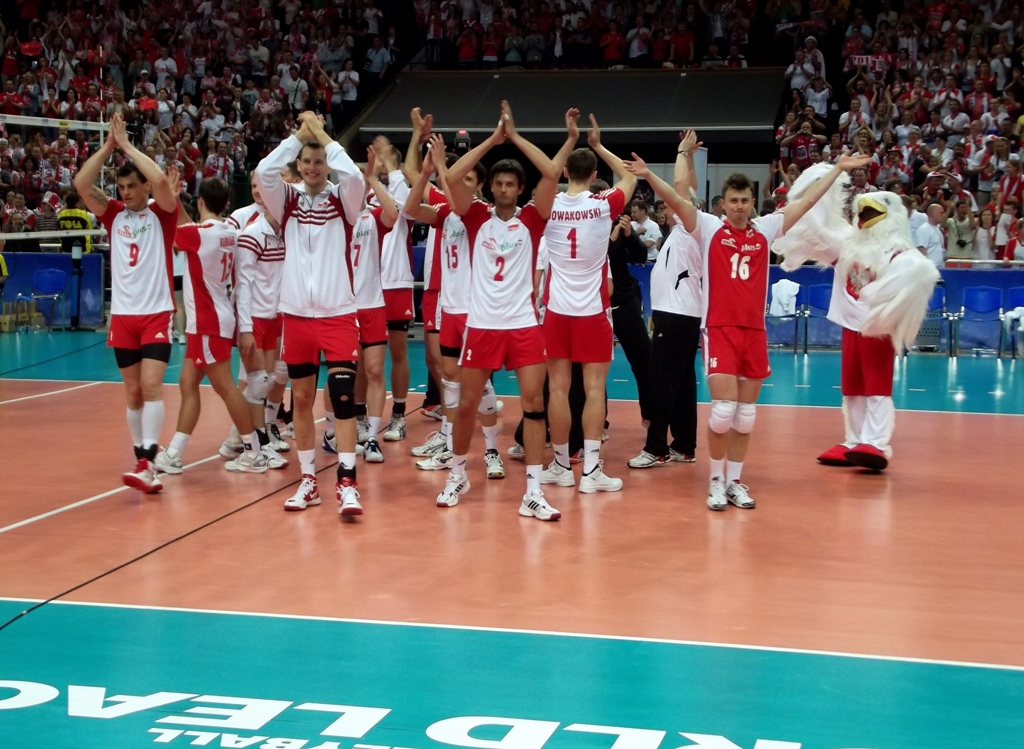
After winning the match at Spodek in Katowice. In the foreground from left: Zbigniew Bartman, Bartosz Kurek, Michał Winiarski and Krzysztof Ignaczak.

== Personal life ==
Kurek was born in Wałbrzych, but raised in Nysa. His father, Adam Kurek, was also a volleyball player. Kurek played basketball in his early youth, but later decided to choose volleyball. He has a younger brother – Jakub. Kurek is married to Anna Grejman, former volleyball player.

== Career ==
=== Club ===
Kurek began his career in a team from Nysa (2004–2005), where he played alongside his father. He spent the next 3 years playing for a PlusLiga club, ZAKSA Kędzierzyn-Koźle (2005–2008).

In 2008, he moved to PGE Skra Bełchatów, one of the most successful teams in PlusLiga, where he quickly became a key player. With Skra, he won the Polish Championship three times: in 2009, 2010 and 2011. On the international stage, he won two Club World Championship silver medals, in 2009 and 2010, and a bronze medal of the CEV Champions League in 2010. On 18 March 2012, they won a silver medal of the CEV Champions League after losing to Zenit Kazan in the final held in Łódź, Poland. Kurek received an individual award for the Best spiker of the tournament.

After the 2011–12 PlusLiga season, Kurek left PGE Skra Bełchatów, and signed a contract with the Russian team, Dynamo Moscow, however, due to injury, he was unable to play for his new team for a large part of the season.

After one season in Russia, Kurek moved to Italian club Lube Banca Macerata. In 2014, they won the Italian Championship, beating Sir Safety Perugia in the final. On 15 October 2014, Lube, including Kurek, won the Italian Super Cup, beating Copra Elior Piacenza (3–2).

On 4 May 2015, Kurek signed a contract with Asseco Resovia. After winning a silver medal of the Polish Championship in 2016, he left Resovia and signed a contract with Japanese club JT Thunders.

On 2 October 2016, he announced suspending his sports career due to physical and mental fatigue. At the same time, he terminated the contract with JT Thunders. In September, he moved back to his former club – PGE Skra Bełchatów.

In 2018, Kurek joined Polish club Stocznia Szczecin. On 29 November 2018, due to club's financial problems, Kurek terminated his contract with Stocznia. On 6 December 2018, he joined Onico Warsaw after leaving Stocznia Szczecin a few days earlier.

=== National team ===
Kurek was a part of the Poland national team which won a gold medal at the 2009 European Championship held in Turkey. On 14 September 2009, he was awarded the Knight's Cross of Polonia Restituta. The Order was conferred on the following day by the Prime Minister of Poland, Donald Tusk.

On 10 July 2011, Kurek, alongside his national team, won Poland's first medal of the World League. They won a bronze medal after defeating Argentina. Kurek received an individual award for the Best scorer of the final tournament. In the same year, Poland took part in the European Championship, where they were the defending champions. Kurek was his team's key player throughout the whole tournament in which the Polish national team won a second medal in 2011 after winning the match for third place against Russia. At the same tournament, Kurek was awarded with his second individual award in 2011, for the Best server of the tournament. In November 2011, despite a back injury, Kurek went to Japan to participate at the World Cup, and helped his team win a silver medal and therefore qualify for the Olympic Games.

On 8 July 2012, the Polish team won a gold medal of the World League. Kurek received an award for the Most valuable player. Kurek was one of the key players of the Polish team at the Olympic Games (London 2012), but nonetheless Poland lost in the quarterfinal to Russia, and was eliminated from the tournament.

In 2014, he was a member of the Polish national team during the 2015 European Championship qualification. He was not included in the Polish national team for the World Championship held in Poland.

After a one year break, he came back to the national team on 28 May 2015 during the first match of intercontinental round of the World League against Russia (3–0). He was a top scorer of the match (15 points).

On 30 September 2018, Poland achieved its third title of the World Champion. Poland beat Brazil in the final (3–0), and defended the title from 2014. Kurek received an individual award for the Most valuable player of the tournament.

On 10 August 2024, he won the silver medal at the 2024 Summer Olympic Games in Paris.

== Honours ==
=== Club ===
- CEV Champions League
  - 2011–12 – with PGE Skra Bełchatów
- FIVB Club World Championship
  - Doha 2009 – with PGE Skra Bełchatów
  - Doha 2010 – with PGE Skra Bełchatów
- CEV Cup
  - 2017–18 – with Ziraat Bankası Ankara
- Domestic
  - 2008–09 Polish Cup, with PGE Skra Bełchatów
  - 2008–09 Polish Championship, with PGE Skra Bełchatów
  - 2009–10 Polish Championship, with PGE Skra Bełchatów
  - 2010–11 Polish Cup, with PGE Skra Bełchatów
  - 2010–11 Polish Championship, with PGE Skra Bełchatów
  - 2011–12 Polish Cup, with PGE Skra Bełchatów
  - 2013–14 Italian Championship, with Cucine Lube Banca Marche Macerata
  - 2014–15 Italian SuperCup, with Cucine Lube Banca Marche Treia
  - 2021–22 Emperor's Cup, with Wolfdogs Nagoya
  - 2022–23 Japanese Championship, with Wolfdogs Nagoya

=== Youth national team ===
- 2005 CEV U19 European Championship

=== Individual awards ===
- 2005: CEV U19 European Championship – Best spiker
- 2009: FIVB Club World Championship – Best scorer
- 2011: Polish Cup – Best spiker
- 2011: FIVB World League – Best scorer
- 2011: CEV European Championship – Best server
- 2012: CEV Champions League – Best spiker
- 2012: FIVB World League – Most valuable player
- 2018: FIVB World Championship – Most valuable player
- 2018: CEV – Male volleyball player of the year
- 2019: Polish Sports Personality of the Year 2018
- 2021: FIVB Nations League – Most valuable player (shared with Wallace de Souza)
- 2021: FIVB Nations League – Best opposite spiker
- 2021: Emperor's Cup – Most valuable player
- 2022: FIVB World Championship – Best opposite spiker
- 2023: Japan V.League – Most valuable player & Best SIX
- 2023: Kurowashiki tournament – Most valuable player & Best SIX

=== State awards ===
- 2009: Knight's Cross of Polonia Restituta
- 2018: Officer's Cross of Polonia Restituta
- 2024: Commander's Cross of Polonia Restituta

=== Statistics ===
- 2015–16 PlusLiga – Best scorer (510 points)
- 2015–16 PlusLiga – Best spiker (430 points)

Awards
Preceded by (Bulgaria) Matey Kaziyski	Best Spiker of CEV Champions League; 2011/2012	Succeeded by (France) Antonin Rouzier
Preceded by (Poland) Mariusz Wlazły	Most Valuable Player of FIVB World Championship; 2018	Succeeded by (Italy) Simone Giannelli
Preceded by (United States) Matt Anderson	Most Valuable Player of FIVB Nations League; 2021 ex aequo (Brazil) Wallace de Souza	Succeeded by (France) Earvin N'Gapeth
Preceded by (United States) Matt Anderson	Best Opposite Spiker of FIVB Nations League; 2021 ex aequo (Brazil) Wallace de Souza	Succeeded by (France) Jean Patry
Preceded by (United States) Matt Anderson	Best Opposite Spiker of FIVB World Championship; 2022	Succeeded by (Italy) Yuri Romanò
