= Mateusz Bieniek =

Polish volleyball player (born 1994)

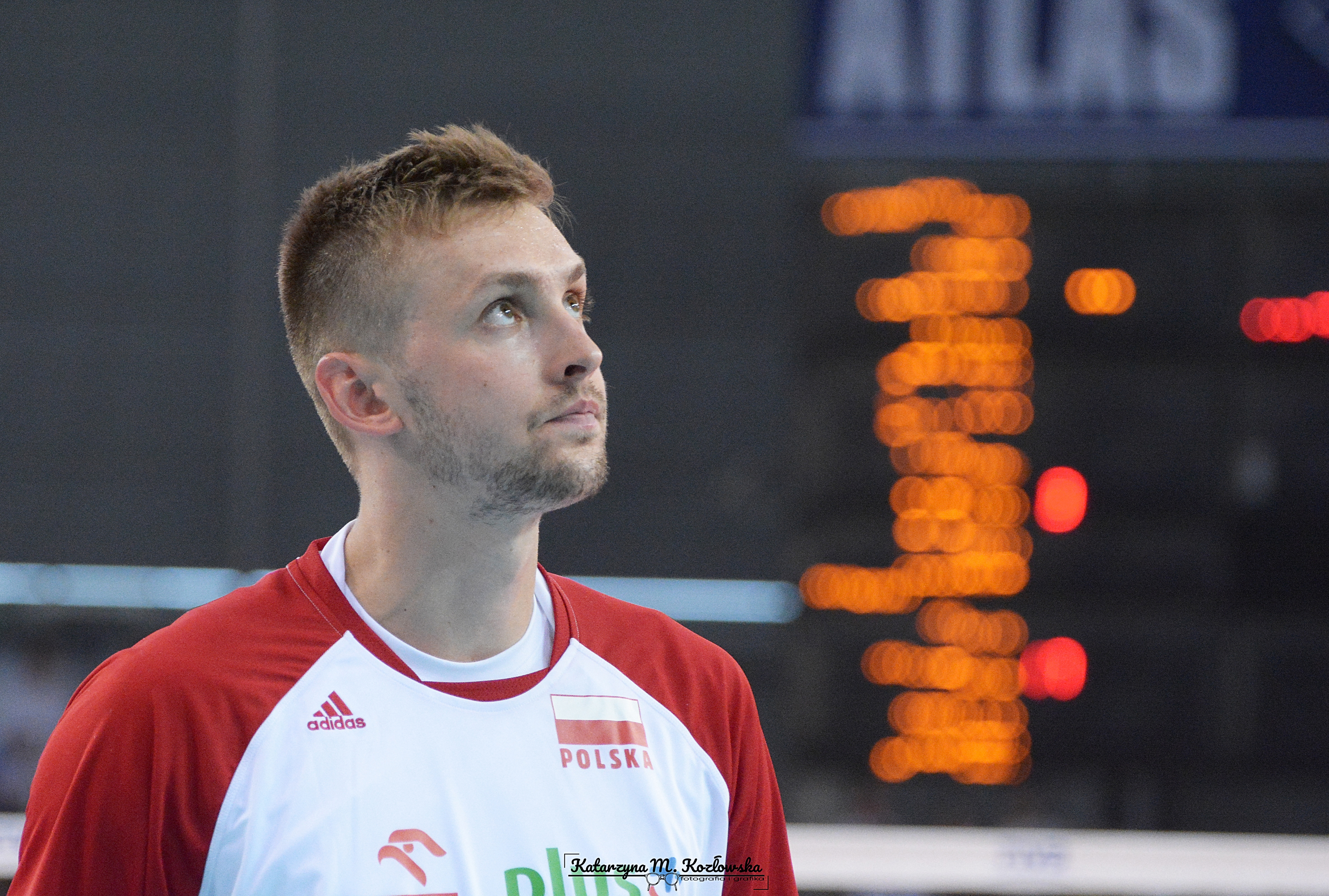
- Bieniek in 2018

Personal information
- Born: 5 April 1994 (age 32); Blachownia, Poland
- Height: 2.10 m (6 ft 11 in)
- Weight: 106 kg (234 lb)
- Spike: 360 cm (142 in)
- Block: 330 cm (130 in)

Volleyball information
- Position: Middle blocker
- Current club: Warta Zawiercie
- Number: 20

Career
Years	Teams
2013–2016; 2016–2019; 2019–2020; 2020–2023; 2023–	Effector Kielce; ZAKSA Kędzierzyn-Koźle; Cucine Lube Civitanova; Skra Bełchatów; Warta Zawiercie

National team
2015–	Poland
Honours
Men's volleyball
Representing Poland
Olympic Games
Silver medal – second place	2024 Paris	Team
FIVB World Championship
Gold medal – first place	2018 Bulgaria/Italy
Silver medal – second place	2022 Poland/Slovenia
FIVB World Cup
Silver medal – second place	2019 Japan
Bronze medal – third place	2015 Japan
FIVB Nations League
Gold medal – first place	2023 Gdańsk
Silver medal – second place	2021 Rimini
Bronze medal – third place	2022 Bologna
Bronze medal – third place	2024 Łódź
CEV European Championship
Bronze medal – third place	2019 Belgium/France/Netherlands/Slovenia
Bronze medal – third place	2021 Poland/Czechia/Estonia/Finland

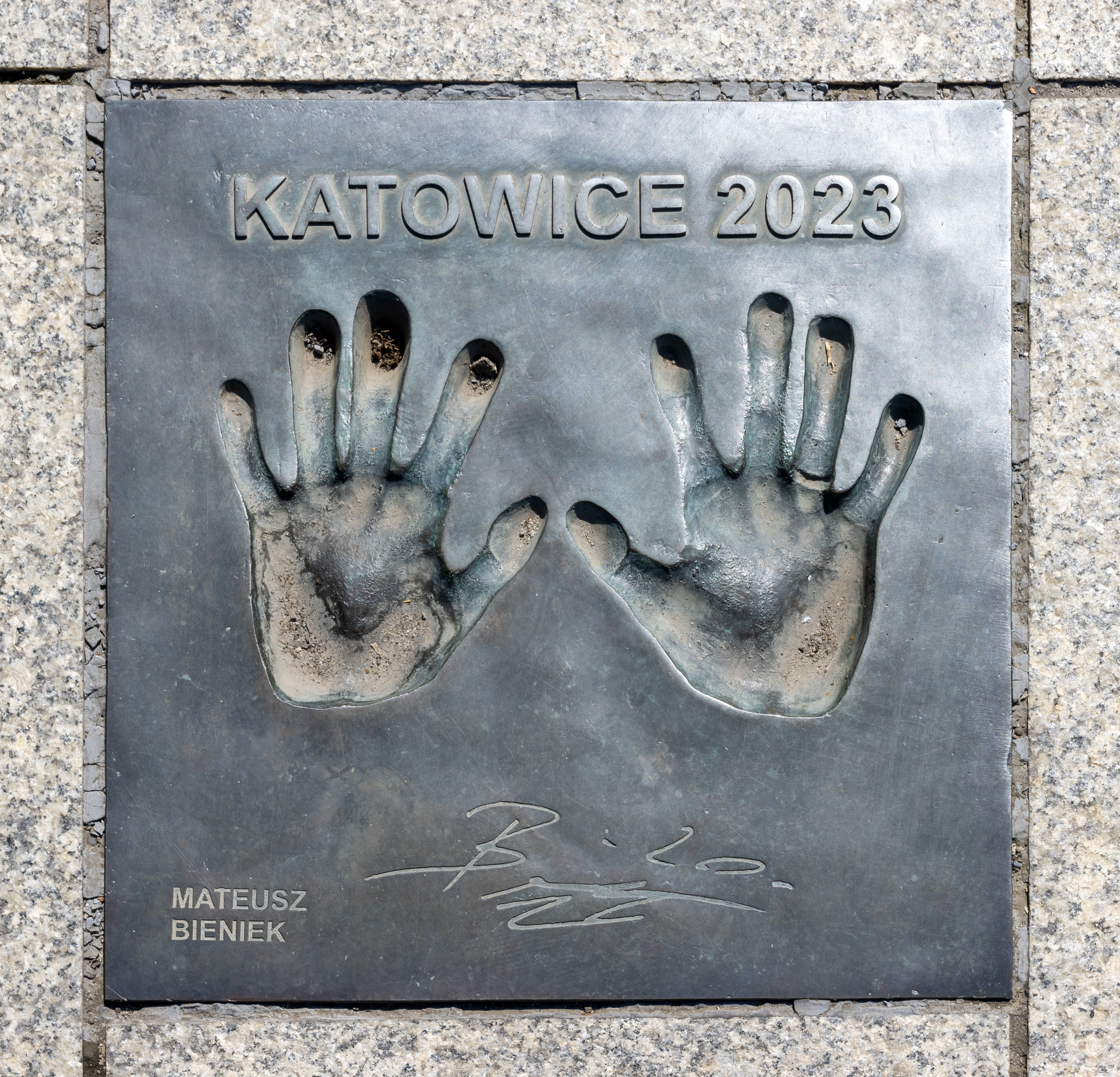
Hand prints and signature at the Avenue of Volleyball Stars, Katowice

Mateusz Bieniek (born 5 April 1994) is a Polish professional volleyball player who plays as a middle blocker for Aluron CMC Warta Zawiercie, which he captains, and the Poland national team. With Poland, Bieniek won the 2018 World Champion title and took part in 3 Olympic Games – Rio 2016, Tokyo 2020 and Paris 2024, winning a silver medal at the latter.

== Career ==
=== National team ===
On 2 April 2015, he was called up to the Polish national team led by Stéphane Antiga. He debuted in the national team on 28 May 2015 in a match of the 2015 World League against Russia (3–0). He achieved 14 points and was named the Most Valuable Player of the match. On 30 September 2018, Poland achieved its third title of the World Champions. Poland beat Brazil in the final (3–0) and defended the title from 2014.

On 10 August 2024, he won the silver medal at the 2024 Summer Olympic Games in Paris.

== Honours ==
=== Club ===
- FIVB Club World Championship
  - Betim 2019 – with Cucine Lube Civitanova
- CEV Champions League
  - 2024–25 – with Aluron CMC Warta Zawiercie
  - 2025–26 – with Aluron CMC Warta Zawiercie
- Domestic
  - 2016–17 Polish Cup, with ZAKSA Kędzierzyn-Koźle
  - 2016–17 Polish Championship, with ZAKSA Kędzierzyn-Koźle
  - 2018–19 Polish Cup, with ZAKSA Kędzierzyn-Koźle
  - 2018–19 Polish Championship, with ZAKSA Kędzierzyn-Koźle
  - 2019–20 Italian Cup, with Cucine Lube Civitanova
  - 2023–24 Polish Cup, with Aluron CMC Warta Zawiercie
  - 2024–25 Polish SuperCup, with Aluron CMC Warta Zawiercie
  - 2025–26 Polish Championship, with Aluron CMC Warta Zawiercie

=== Individual awards ===
- 2021: FIVB Nations League – Best middle blocker
- 2022: FIVB Nations League – Best middle blocker
- 2022: FIVB World Championship – Best middle blocker
- 2026: CEV Champions League – Best middle blocker

=== State awards ===
- 2018: Gold Cross of Merit
- 2024: Knight's Cross of Polonia Restituta

=== Statistics ===
- 2021–22 PlusLiga – Best server (72 aces)

Awards
Preceded by (Russia) Ivan Iakovlev (United States) Maxwell Holt	Best Middle Blocker of FIVB Nations League; 2021 ex aequo (Brazil) Maurício Souza; 2022 ex aequo (United States) David Smith	Succeeded by (Poland) Jakub Kochanowski (United States) David Smith
Preceded by (Brazil) Lucas Saatkamp (Poland) Piotr Nowakowski	Best Middle Blocker of FIVB World Championship; 2022 ex aequo (Italy) Gianluca Galassi	Succeeded by (Bulgaria) Aleks Grozdanov (Poland) Jakub Kochanowski
