= Mattia Bottolo =

Italian volleyball player (born 2000)

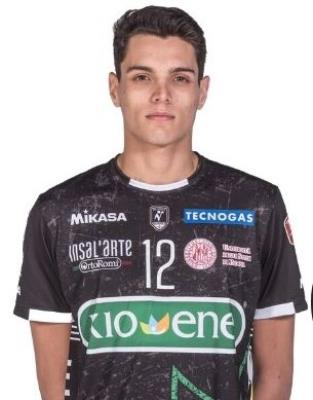

Personal information
- National team: Italy
- Born: 3 January 2000 (age 26) Bassano del Grappa, Italy
- Height: 1.96 m (6 ft 5 in)
- Weight: 77 kg (170 lb)

Sport
- Sport: Volleyball
- Club: Kioene Padova(2019 - 2022); A.S. Volley Lube Civitanova(2022 - Present)
Medal record
Men's volleyball
Representing Italy
FIVB World Championship
Gold medal – first place	2022 Poland/Slovenia
Gold medal – first place	2025 Philippines
European Championship
Gold medal – first place	2021 Poland/Czechia/Estonia/Finland
Silver medal – second place	2023 Italy/Bulgaria/North Macedonia/Israel

Mattia Bottolo (born 3 January 2000) is an Italian professional volleyball player who plays as an outside hitter for Lega Pallavolo Serie A club Cucine Lube Civitanova and the Italy national team.

Bottolo won both the 2021 European Championship. and the 2022 FIVB Volleyball Men's World Championship with Italy.

== Sporting achievements ==
CLUB

=== National championships ===
- 2022/2023 Italian Championship, with Cucine Lube Civitanova
