= Gianluca Galassi =

Italian volleyball player (born 1997)

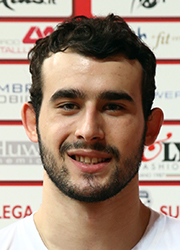

Personal information
- Nationality: Italian
- Born: 24 July 1997 (age 29); Trento, Italy
- Height: 201 cm (6 ft 7 in)
- Weight: 94 kg (207 lb)

Career
Years	Teams
2019 - present	Vero Volley Monza
2018 - 2019	Sir Safety Conad Perugia
2016 - 2018	Revivre Milano
2015 - 2016	Club Italia Roma
Honours
Men's volleyball
Representing Italy
FIVB World Championship
Gold medal – first place	2022 Poland/Slovenia
Gold medal – first place	2025 Philippines
FIVB Nations League
Silver medal – second place	2025 Ningbo
CEV European Championship
Gold medal – first place	2021 Poland/Czechia/Estonia/Finland
Silver medal – second place	2023 Italy/Bulgaria/North Macedonia/Israel

Gianluca Galassi (born 24 July 1997) is an Italian volleyball player who plays as a middle blocker for Lega Pallavolo Serie A club Gas Sales Piacenza and the Italy national team.

== Individual awards ==
- 2022: FIVB World Championship – Best middle blocker

Awards
Preceded by (Brazil) Lucas Saatkamp (Poland) Piotr Nowakowski	Best Middle Blocker of FIVB World Championship; 2022 ex aequo (Poland) Mateusz Bieniek	Succeeded by TBD
