= Yuri Romanò =

Italian volleyball player (born 1997)

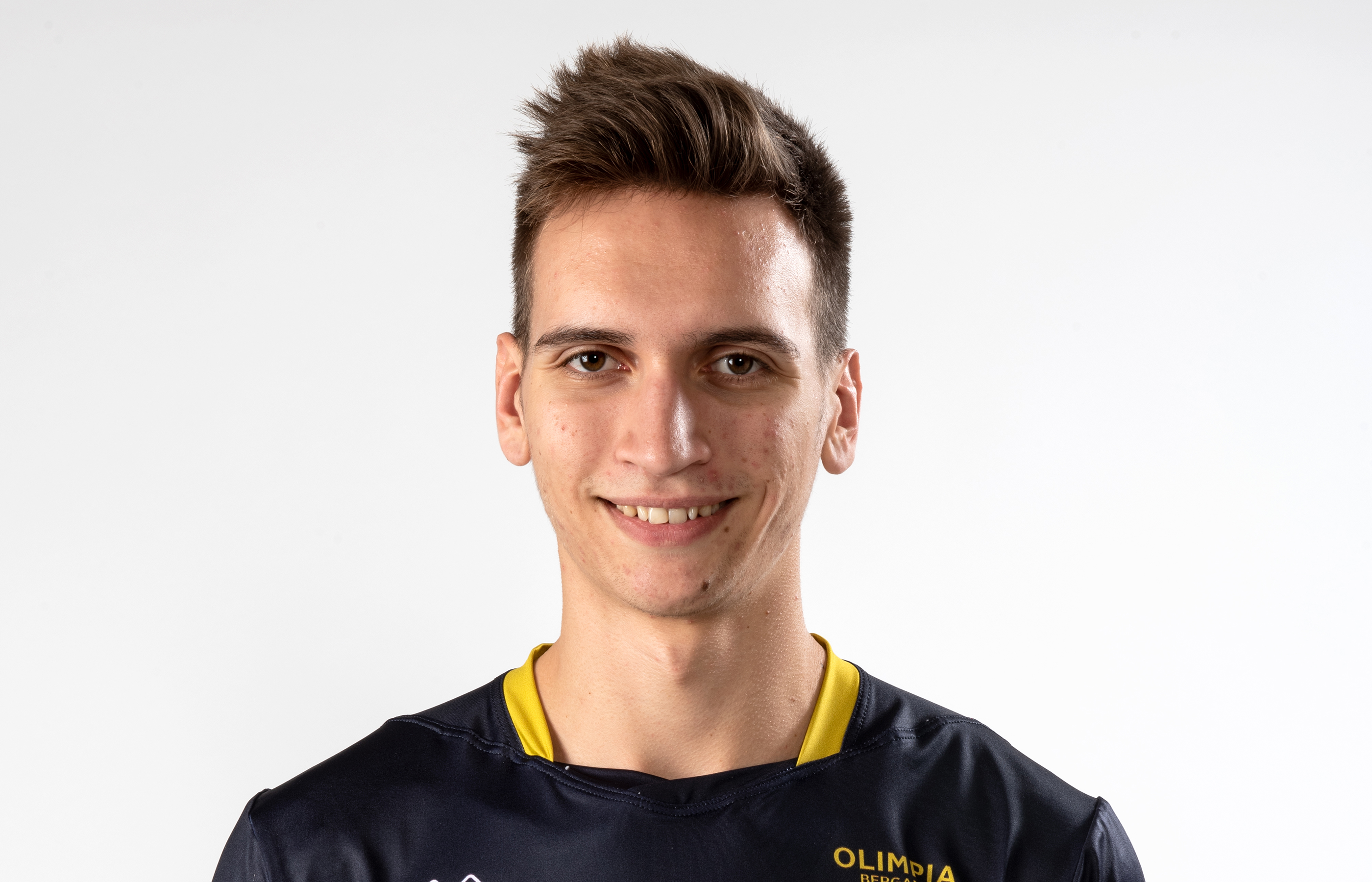
- Romanò in 2019

Personal information
- National team: Italy
- Born: 26 July 1997 (age 29) Monza, Italy
- Height: 2.03 m (6 ft 8 in)

Sport
- Sport: Volleyball
- Club: PGE Projekt Warszawa
Medal record
Men's volleyball
Representing Italy
FIVB World Championship
Gold medal – first place	2022 Poland/Slovenia
Gold medal – first place	2025 Philippines
FIVB Nations League
Silver medal – second place	2025 Ningbo
European Championship
Gold medal – first place	2021 Poland/Czechia/Estonia/Finland
Silver medal – second place	2023 Italy/Bulgaria/North Macedonia/Israel

Yuri Romanò (born 26 July 1997) is an Italian volleyball player who plays as an opposite for PlusLiga club PGE Projekt Warszawa and the Italy national team.

He won 2021 European Championship, and also the 2022 FIVB Volleyball Men's World Championship, and 2025 FIVB Volleyball Men's World Championship.

Romanò is Gas Sales Piacenza's all-time top scorer, with 1317 points for the club to his name.

== Honours ==
=== Clubs ===
- National championships
  - 2022/2023 Italian Cup, with Gas Sales Bluenergy Piacenza
