= Daniele Lavia =

Italian volleyball player (born 1999)

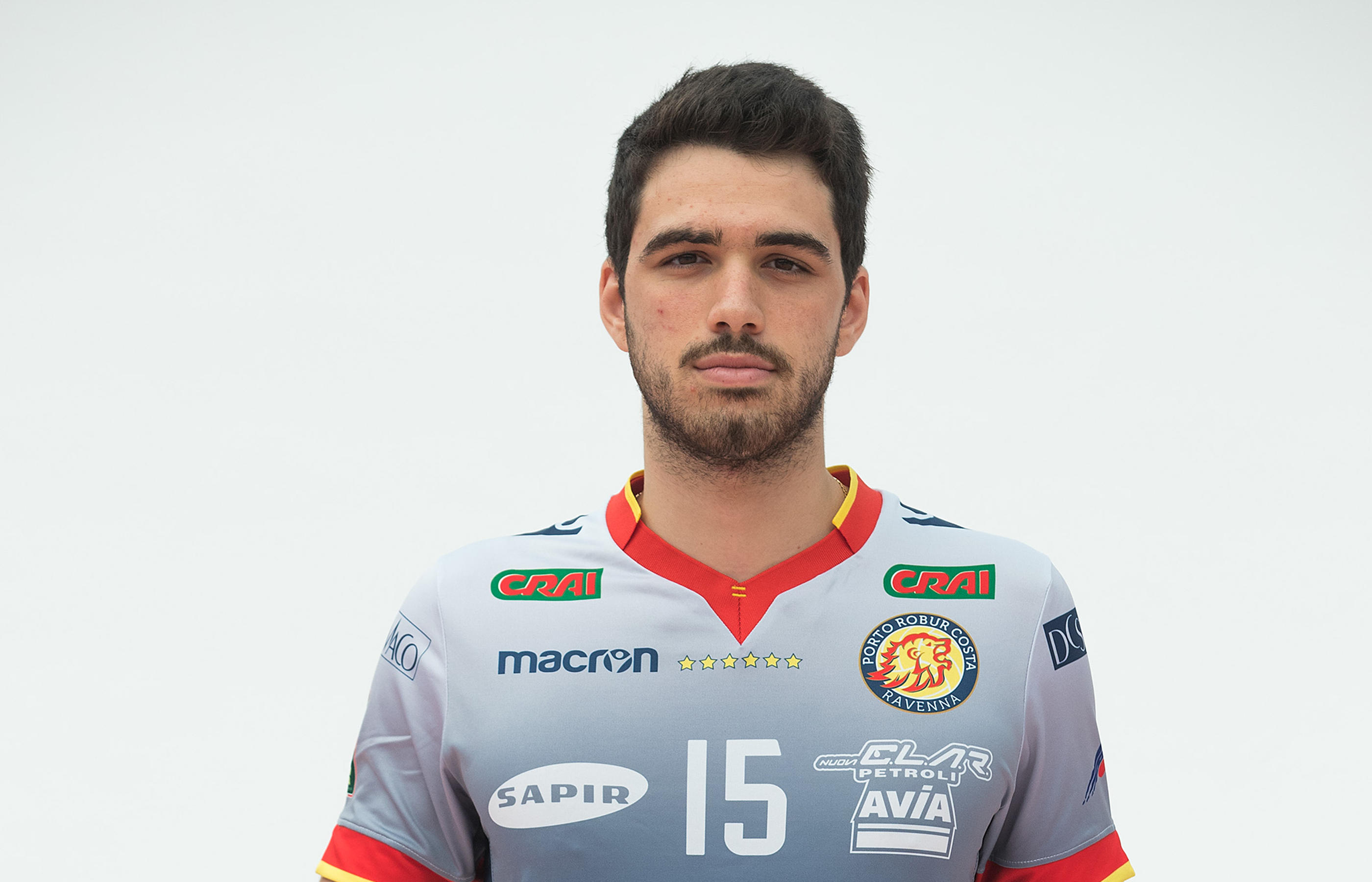
- Lavia in 2019

Personal information
- Nationality: Italy
- Born: 4 November 1999 (age 26); Cariati, Italy
- Height: 200 cm (6 ft 7 in)
- Spike: 345 cm (136 in)
- Block: 315 cm (124 in)

Volleyball information
- Position: Outside hitter
- Number: 15

Career
Years	Teams
2018–2020; 2020–2021; 2021–present	(Italy) Consar Ravenna (Italy) Leo Shoes Modena (Italy) Itas Trentino

National team
2019–	Italy
Honours
Men's volleyball
Representing Italy
FIVB World Championship
Gold medal – first place	2022 Poland/Slovenia
FIVB Nations League
Silver medal – second place	2025 Ningbo
CEV European Championship
Gold medal – first place	2021 Poland/Czechia/Estonia/Finland
Silver medal – second place	2023 Italy/Bulgaria/North Macedonia/Israel

Daniele Lavia (Italian pronunciation: [daˈnjɛːle laˈviːa]; born 4 November 1999) is an Italian professional volleyball player who plays as an outside hitter for Lega Pallavolo Serie A club Itas Trentino and the Italy national team.

Lavia was a participant in the 2020 and 2024 Olympic Games.

== Sporting achievements ==
=== Clubs ===
- FIVB Club World Championship
  - Betim 2021 – with Itas Trentino
  - Betim 2022 – with Itas Trentino
- National championships
  - 2021/2022 Italian SuperCup, with Itas Trentino
  - 2022/2023 Italian Cup, with Itas Trentino
  - 2022/2023 Italian Championship, with Itas Trentino
- CEV Champions League
  - 2023/2024 – with Itas Trentino

=== Youth national team ===
- 2017 U19 European Championship
- 2019 U21 World Championship

=== National team ===
- 2021 CEV European Championship
- 2022 FIVB World Championship

=== Individual ===
- 2019: U21 World Championship – Best Outside Hitters
- 2021: CEV European Championship – Best Outside Hitters

Awards
Preceded by (Poland) Wilfredo León (Serbia) Uroš Kovačević	Best Outside Hitters of CEV European Championship; 2021 (with (Italy) Alessandro Michieletto)	Succeeded by Incumbent
