= 2022 FIVB Men's Volleyball World Championship =

International volleyball competition

2022 FIVB Men's World Championship
Mistrzostwa Świata w Piłce Siatkowej Mężczyzn 2022 Svetovno prvenstvo v odbojki 2022
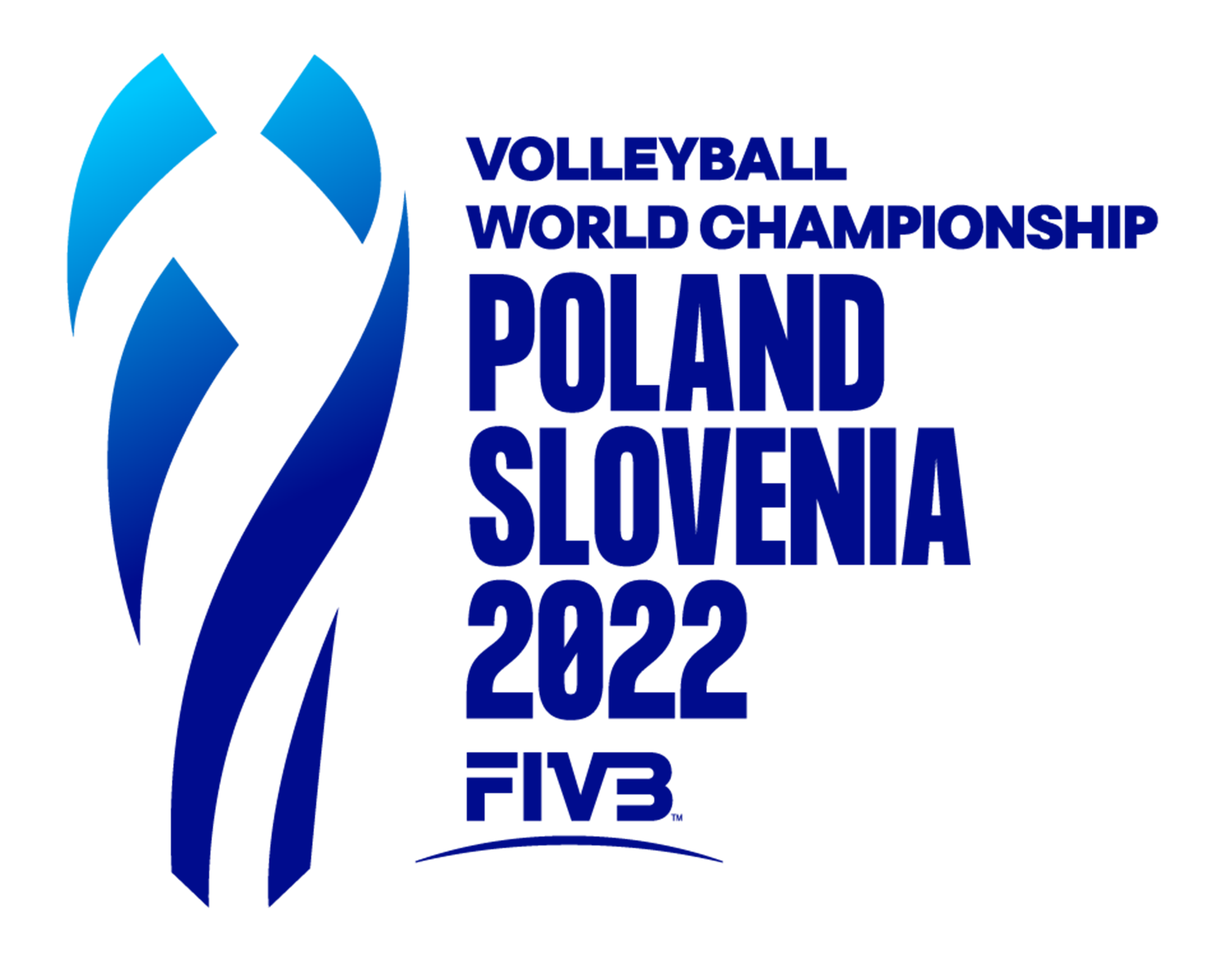

Tournament details
- Host countries: Poland; Slovenia
- Cities: Gliwice; Katowice; Ljubljana
- Dates: 26 August – 11 September
- Teams: 24 (from 5 confederations)
- Venue: 3 (in 3 host cities)
- Officially opened by: Andrzej Duda and Borut Pahor

Final positions
- Champions: Italy (4th title)
- Runners-up: Poland
- Third place: Brazil
- Fourth place: Slovenia

Tournament awards
- MVP: (Italy) Simone Giannelli
- Best Setter: (Italy) Simone Giannelli
- Best OH: (Brazil) Yoandy Leal (Poland) Kamil Semeniuk
- Best MB: (Poland) Mateusz Bieniek (Italy) Gianluca Galassi
- Best OPP: (Poland) Bartosz Kurek
- Best Libero: (Italy) Fabio Balaso

Tournament statistics
- Matches played: 52
- Attendance: 194,612 (3,743 per match)
- Best scorer: (Brazil) Yoandy Leal (125 points)
- Best spiker: (Italy) Daniele Lavia (52.91%)
- Best blocker: (Argentina) Agustín Loser (3.40 Avg)
- Best server: (Ukraine) Oleh Plotnytskyi (3.60 Avg)
- Best setter: (Argentina) Luciano De Cecco (26.29 Avg)
- Best digger: (Brazil) Thales Hoss (8.43 Avg)
- Best receiver: (Netherlands) Robbert Andringa (39.53%)

The 2022 FIVB Men's Volleyball World Championship was the 20th staging of the FIVB Men's Volleyball World Championship, contested by the senior men's national teams of the members of the Fédération Internationale de Volleyball (FIVB), the sport's global governing body. The tournament was held in Poland and Slovenia from 26 August to 11 September 2022. It was originally planned to be held in Russia. However, due to Russia's invasion of Ukraine starting on 24 February, Russia was stripped of organization rights.

Italy claimed their fourth title, defeating the reigning world champions Poland in four sets. Brazil won the third place match, defeating Slovenia in four sets. Simone Giannelli from Italy was elected the MVP of the tournament, becoming the first setter to win the award since Vyacheslav Zaytsev in 1982.

== Host selection ==
On 15 November 2018, at the FIVB Congress in Cancún, Mexico, FIVB initially announced that the tournament would be held in Russia. The tournament was to take place in ten cities (Moscow, Saint Petersburg, Kaliningrad, Yaroslavl, Kazan, Ufa, Yekaterinburg, Novosibirsk, Kemerovo, and Krasnoyarsk).

On 9 December 2019, the World Anti-Doping Agency initially handed Russia a four-year ban from all major sporting events, after RUSADA was found non-compliant for handing over manipulating lab data to investigators. The WADA ruling allowed athletes who were not involved in the doping or the coverup to compete, but prohibited the use of the Russian flag and anthem at major international sporting events. However, the Russia national team could still enter qualification, as the ban only applies to the final tournament to decide the world champions. The ruling was appealed to the Court of Arbitration for Sport (CAS), which ruled against RUSADA on 17 December 2020, but reduced the ban from four to two years, expiring on 16 December 2022. The CAS ruling also allowed the name "Russia" to be displayed on uniforms, as well as the display of Russian colors, if the words "Neutral Athlete" or "Neutral Team" had equal prominence. As Russia already qualified, its players were unable to use their country's name alone, flag or anthem at the championship, as a result of the two-year ban from world championships in any sport. Russia was scheduled to compete as the Volleyball Federation of Russia (VFR).

Because of the 2022 Russian invasion of Ukraine, Poland, France, Slovenia, as well as the Netherlands threatened to boycott the Championship if Russia were to remain the host. This was confirmed by the Dutch volleyball association on 28 February 2022. Russia was later stripped of its hosting rights on 1 March 2022 due to its invasion.

An accelerated bidding process was opened to determine the new host countries for the tournament. It allowed for the possibility that pool phase could be hosted by two or more countries, up to two hosts in the Round of 16 and quarterfinals, and a single host for the semifinals and final.

On 15 April 2022, FIVB announced that Poland and Slovenia will host the relocated 2022 Men's World Championship.

== Qualification ==
The current world champions Poland automatically qualified for the competition. The top two teams from each of the 2021 Continental Championships secured qualification. The final 12 places were given to top 12 teams as per FIVB World Ranking who have not yet qualified. After Russia was removed from the competition and new hosts Poland and Slovenia had already qualified, Ukraine has been invited in the competition line up as the next highest ranked team in the World Ranking.

Country	Confederation	Qualified as	Qualified on	Previous appearances			Previous best performance
Country	Confederation	Qualified as	Qualified on	Total	First	Last	Previous best performance
~~VFR~~^{a}	~~CEV~~	~~Host country~~	~~15 November 2018~~	~~19~~^{a}	1949	2018	Champions (1949, 1952, 1960, 1962, 1978, 1982)
Poland	CEV	Defending champions	30 September 2018	17	1949	2018	Champions (1974, 2014, 2018)
Puerto Rico	NORCECA	2021 NORCECA champions	22 August 2021	5	1974	2018	12th place (2006)
Canada	NORCECA	2021 NORCECA runners-up	22 August 2021	11	1974	2018	7th place (2014)
Brazil	CSV	2021 South American champions	4 September 2021	17	1956	2018	Champions (2002, 2006, 2010)
Argentina	CSV	2021 South American runners-up	4 September 2021	12	1960	2018	3rd place (1982)
Cameroon	CAVB	2021 African runners-up	13 September 2021	4	1990	2018	13th place (2010)
Tunisia	CAVB	2021 African champions	13 September 2021	10	1962	2018	15th place (2006)
Iran	AVC	2021 Asian champions	18 September 2021	6	1970	2018	6th place (2014)
Japan	AVC	2021 Asian runners-up	18 September 2021	15	1960	2018	3rd place (1970, 1974)
Slovenia	CEV	2021 European runners-up	18 September 2021	1	2018		12th place (2018)
Italy	CEV	2021 European champions	18 September 2021	17	1949	2018	Champions (1990, 1994, 1998)
France	CEV	1st World ranked non-qualified team	20 September 2021	16	1949	2018	3rd place (2002)
United States	NORCECA	2nd World ranked non-qualified team	20 September 2021	16	1956	2018	Champions (1986)
Serbia	CEV	3rd World ranked non-qualified team	20 September 2021	10^{b}	1956	2018	Runners-up (1998)
Cuba	NORCECA	4th World ranked non-qualified team	20 September 2021	15	1956	2018	Runners-up (1990, 2010)
Netherlands	CEV	5th World ranked non-qualified team	20 September 2021	12	1949	2018	Runners-up (1994)
Germany	CEV	6th World ranked non-qualified team	20 September 2021	11^{c}	1956	2014	Champions (1970)
Mexico	NORCECA	7th World ranked non-qualified team	20 September 2021	5	1974	2014	10th place (1974)
Turkey	CEV	8th World ranked non-qualified team	20 September 2021	3	1956	1998	15th place (1966)
Egypt	CAVB	9th World ranked non-qualified team	20 September 2021	9	1974	2018	13th place (2010)
Qatar	AVC	10th World ranked non-qualified team	20 September 2021	0	None		None
Bulgaria	CEV	11th World ranked non-qualified team	20 September 2021	18	1949	2018	Runners-up (1970)
China	AVC	12th World ranked non-qualified team	20 September 2021	14	1956	2018	7th place (1978, 1982)
Ukraine	CEV	Reallocation	15 April 2022	1	1998		10th place (1998)

Notes
^{a} Competed as Soviet Union from 1949 to 1990 (12 times); 7 appearances as Russia. Russia was initially suspended from competing under it national title due to Russia violating WADA regulations. Later, the team was removed completely from all FIVB and continental competitions due to the 2022 Russian invasion of Ukraine.
^{b} Competed as SFR Yugoslavia from 1956 to 1970 (4 times) and as Serbia and Montenegro (FR Yugoslavia) from 1998 to 2006 (3 times); 3 appearances as Serbia.
^{c} Competed as East Germany from 1956 to 1982 (7 times) and as West Germany from 1956 to 1966 (2 times); 4 appearances as Germany.

== Format ==
=== Preliminary round ===
In the first round, the 24 teams were spread across six pools of four teams playing in a single round-robin format. The top two teams in each pool and the top four of the third placed teams qualified for the final round. All results of this round combined in a single ranking table to determine a final round pairing and also 17th to 24th rank in final standing.

=== Final round ===
The qualified teams from preliminary round competed in the knock-out stage.

In round of sixteen, the qualified teams matched-up according to the Berger table based on their ranking in the combined ranking table. However, FIVB reserved the first and second position for the host teams if they qualify. The better ranked host team secured the first position, and the worse ranked host team secured the second position. The winners in this round qualified for quarterfinals. The results of this round have combined to preliminary round's combined ranking to determine 9th to 16th rank in final standing. This procedure also applied in quarterfinals to determine 5th to 8th rank in final standing. In semifinals, the winners advanced to compete for the World Championship title. The losers faced each other in the third place match.

== Pools composition ==
The 24 teams were distributed to 6 pools of 4 teams. Teams were seeded in the first position of each pool following the serpentine system according to their FIVB World Ranking as of 20 September 2021. FIVB reserved the right to seed the hosts as head of pool A regardless of the World Ranking. All teams not seeded were drawn to take other available positions in the remaining lines, following the World Ranking. The draw was held at Irina Viner-Usmanova Gymnastics Palace, Moscow, Russia on 30 September 2021. Rankings are shown in brackets except the original hosts who ranked third.

Seeded teams	Pot 1	Pot 2	Pot 3
VFR (Hosts; later DQ); Brazil (1); Poland (2); France (4); Italy (5); Argentina (6)	United States (7); Slovenia (8); Serbia (9); Iran (10); Japan (11); Canada (12)	Cuba (13); Tunisia (14); Netherlands (15); Germany (16); Mexico (17); Turkey (18)	Egypt (19); Qatar (20); Bulgaria (21); China (22); Puerto Rico (24); Cameroon (25)

Draw

Pool A	Pool B	Pool C	Pool D	Pool E	Pool F
~~VFR~~; Ukraine*	Brazil	Poland	France	Italy	Argentina
Serbia	Japan	United States	Slovenia	Canada	Iran
Tunisia	Cuba	Mexico	Germany	Turkey	Netherlands
Puerto Rico	Qatar	Bulgaria	Cameroon	China	Egypt

- (*) Replaced after the draw.

== Venues ==
Pool A, C and Final round	Final round	Pool B, D, E, F and Final round
Katowice, Poland	Gliwice, Poland	Ljubljana, Slovenia
Spodek	Gliwice Arena	Arena Stožice
Capacity: 11,036	Capacity: 13,752	Capacity: 12,480
2022 FIVB Men's Volleyball World Championship (Poland)		2022 FIVB Men's Volleyball World Championship (Slovenia)

== Pool standing procedure ==
1. Ranking of pool. Only valid to determine ranking position to Round of 16.
2. Total number of victories (matches won, matches lost)
3. In the event of a tie, the following first tiebreaker will apply: The teams will be ranked by the most point gained per match as follows:
  - Match won 3–0 or 3–1: 3 points for the winner, 0 points for the loser
  - Match won 3–2: 2 points for the winner, 1 point for the loser
  - Match forfeited: 3 points for the winner, 0 points (0–25, 0–25, 0–25) for the loser
4. If teams are still tied after examining the number of victories and points gained, then the FIVB will examine the results in order to break the tie in the following order:
  - Set quotient: if two or more teams are tied on the number of points gained, they will be ranked by the quotient resulting from the division of the number of all set won by the number of all sets lost.
  - Points quotient: if the tie persists based on the set quotient, the teams will be ranked by the quotient resulting from the division of all points scored by the total of points lost during all sets.
  - If the tie persists based on the point quotient, the tie will be broken based on the team that won the match of the Round Robin Phase between the tied teams. When the tie in point quotient is between three or more teams, these teams ranked taking into consideration only the matches involving the teams in question.

== Preliminary round ==
- All times are Central European Summer Time (UTC+02:00).
- The top two teams in each pool and the top four of the third placed teams qualified for the final round.

=== Pool A ===
Pos	Team	Pld	W	L	Pts	SW	SL	SR	SPW	SPL	SPR	Qualification
1	Serbia	3	3	0	9	9	0	MAX	233	187	1.246	Final round
2	Ukraine	3	2	1	6	6	4	1.500	241	213	1.131	Final round
3	Tunisia	3	1	2	3	3	6	0.500	189	210	0.900	Final round
4	Puerto Rico	3	0	3	0	1	9	0.111	197	250	0.788	

Source: Volleyball World

Date	Time		Score		Set 1	Set 2	Set 3	Set 4	Set 5	Total	Report
27 Aug	17:30	Tunisia	3–0	Puerto Rico	25–19	25–17	25–20			75–56	P2 Report
27 Aug	20:30	Ukraine	0–3	Serbia	26–28	21–25	20–25			67–78	P2 Report
29 Aug	17:30	Serbia	3–0	Puerto Rico	26–24	25–21	25–16			76–61	P2 Report
29 Aug	20:30	Ukraine	3–0	Tunisia	25–21	25–19	25–15			75–55	P2 Report
31 Aug	17:30	Serbia	3–0	Tunisia	29–27	25–15	25–17			79–59	P2 Report
31 Aug	20:30	Ukraine	3–1	Puerto Rico	24–26	25–19	25–16	25–19		99–80	P2 Report

=== Pool B ===
Pos	Team	Pld	W	L	Pts	SW	SL	SR	SPW	SPL	SPR	Qualification
1	Brazil	3	3	0	8	9	2	4.500	271	222	1.221	Final round
2	Japan	3	2	1	6	6	4	1.500	226	205	1.102	Final round
3	Cuba	3	1	2	4	6	7	0.857	281	302	0.930	Final round
4	Qatar	3	0	3	0	1	9	0.111	199	248	0.802	

Source: Volleyball World

Date	Time		Score		Set 1	Set 2	Set 3	Set 4	Set 5	Total	Report
26 Aug	11:00	Brazil	3–2	Cuba	31–33	21–25	25–16	25–17	18–16	120–107	P2 Report
26 Aug	14:00	Japan	3–0	Qatar	25–20	25–18	25–15			75–53	P2 Report
28 Aug	11:00	Cuba	3–1	Qatar	25–21	25–21	22–25	25–19		97–86	P2 Report
28 Aug	14:00	Brazil	3–0	Japan	25–21	25–18	25–16			75–55	P2 Report
30 Aug	11:00	Brazil	3–0	Qatar	25–13	25–23	26–24			76–60	P2 Report
30 Aug	14:00	Japan	3–1	Cuba	25–18	21–25	25–15	25–19		96–77	P2 Report

=== Pool C ===
Pos	Team	Pld	W	L	Pts	SW	SL	SR	SPW	SPL	SPR	Qualification
1	Poland	3	3	0	9	9	1	9.000	248	188	1.319	Final round
2	United States	3	2	1	6	7	3	2.333	237	215	1.102	Final round
3	Mexico	3	1	2	2	3	8	0.375	211	259	0.815	
4	Bulgaria	3	0	3	1	2	9	0.222	228	262	0.870	

Source: Volleyball World

Date	Time		Score		Set 1	Set 2	Set 3	Set 4	Set 5	Total	Report
26 Aug	17:30	United States	3–0	Mexico	25–18	25–20	25–12			75–50	P2 Report
26 Aug	20:30	Poland	3–0	Bulgaria	25–12	25–20	25–20			75–52	P2 Report
28 Aug	17:30	United States	3–0	Bulgaria	25–20	25–23	26–24			76–67	P2 Report
28 Aug	20:30	Poland	3–0	Mexico	25–17	25–14	25–19			75–50	P2 Report
30 Aug	17:30	Mexico	3–2	Bulgaria	20–25	25–20	25–23	23–25	18–16	111–109	P2 Report
30 Aug	20:30	Poland	3–1	United States	23–25	25–21	25–19	25–21		98–86	P2 Report

=== Pool D ===
Pos	Team	Pld	W	L	Pts	SW	SL	SR	SPW	SPL	SPR	Qualification
1	France	3	3	0	8	9	2	4.500	273	242	1.128	Final round
2	Slovenia	3	2	1	7	8	3	2.667	260	237	1.097	Final round
3	Germany	3	1	2	3	3	6	0.500	207	215	0.963	Final round
4	Cameroon	3	0	3	0	0	9	0.000	184	230	0.800	

Source: Volleyball World

Date	Time		Score		Set 1	Set 2	Set 3	Set 4	Set 5	Total	Report
26 Aug	17:30	France	3–0	Germany	25–22	28–26	26–24			79–72	P2 Report
26 Aug	20:30	Slovenia	3–0	Cameroon	25–19	25–23	25–21			75–63	P2 Report
28 Aug	17:30	Germany	3–0	Cameroon	30–28	25–14	25–19			80–61	P2 Report
28 Aug	20:30	France	3–2	Slovenia	25–21	22–25	23–25	34–32	15–7	119–110	P2 Report
30 Aug	17:30	France	3–0	Cameroon	25–19	25–19	25–22			75–60	P2 Report
30 Aug	20:30	Slovenia	3–0	Germany	25–16	25–22	25–17			75–55	P2 Report

=== Pool E ===
Pos	Team	Pld	W	L	Pts	SW	SL	SR	SPW	SPL	SPR	Qualification
1	Italy	3	3	0	9	9	0	MAX	239	166	1.440	Final round
2	Turkey	3	2	1	6	6	3	2.000	210	186	1.129	Final round
3	Canada	3	1	2	3	3	6	0.500	206	231	0.892	
4	China	3	0	3	0	0	9	0.000	153	225	0.680	

Source: Volleyball World

Date	Time		Score		Set 1	Set 2	Set 3	Set 4	Set 5	Total	Report
27 Aug	11:00	Turkey	3–0	China	25–15	25–19	25–14			75–48	P2 Report
27 Aug	21:15	Italy	3–0	Canada	25–13	25–18	39–37			89–68	P2 Report
29 Aug	11:00	Canada	3–0	China	25–23	25–21	25–23			75–67	P2 Report
29 Aug	21:15	Italy	3–0	Turkey	25–18	25–20	25–22			75–60	P2 Report
31 Aug	14:00	Canada	0–3	Turkey	23–25	23–25	17–25			63–75	P2 Report
31 Aug	21:15	Italy	3–0	China	25–14	25–10	25–14			75–38	P2 Report

=== Pool F ===
Pos	Team	Pld	W	L	Pts	SW	SL	SR	SPW	SPL	SPR	Qualification
1	Netherlands	3	3	0	8	9	3	3.000	286	250	1.144	Final round
2	Iran	3	2	1	5	7	6	1.167	313	302	1.036	Final round
3	Argentina	3	1	2	4	7	8	0.875	351	347	1.012	Final round
4	Egypt	3	0	3	1	3	9	0.333	239	290	0.824	

Source: Volleyball World

Date	Time		Score		Set 1	Set 2	Set 3	Set 4	Set 5	Total	Report
27 Aug	14:00	Netherlands	3–0	Egypt	25–17	25–22	25–16			75–55	P2 Report
27 Aug	17:30	Argentina	2–3	Iran	25–22	28–30	18–25	34–32	19–21	124–130	P2 Report
29 Aug	14:00	Argentina	2–3	Netherlands	30–28	25–20	21–25	25–27	9–15	110–115	P2 Report
29 Aug	17:30	Iran	3–1	Egypt	25–14	25–19	22–25	26–24		98–82	P2 Report
31 Aug	11:00	Argentina	3–2	Egypt	27–25	26–28	24–26	25–17	15–6	117–102	P2 Report
31 Aug	17:30	Iran	1–3	Netherlands	22–25	25–21	20–25	18–25		85–96	P2 Report

=== Combined ranking ===
Pos	Pool	Team	Pld	W	L	Pts	SW	SL	SR	SPW	SPL	SPR	Rank
1	E	Italy	3	3	0	9	9	0	MAX	239	166	1.440	First in each of the pools
2	A	Serbia	3	3	0	9	9	0	MAX	233	187	1.246	First in each of the pools
3	C	Poland	3	3	0	9	9	1	9.000	248	188	1.319	First in each of the pools
4	B	Brazil	3	3	0	8	9	2	4.500	271	222	1.221	First in each of the pools
5	D	France	3	3	0	8	9	2	4.500	273	242	1.128	First in each of the pools
6	F	Netherlands	3	3	0	8	9	3	3.000	286	250	1.144	First in each of the pools
7	D	Slovenia	3	2	1	7	8	3	2.667	260	237	1.097	Second in each of the pools
8	C	United States	3	2	1	6	7	3	2.333	237	215	1.102	Second in each of the pools
9	E	Turkey	3	2	1	6	6	3	2.000	210	186	1.129	Second in each of the pools
10	A	Ukraine	3	2	1	6	6	4	1.500	241	213	1.131	Second in each of the pools
11	B	Japan	3	2	1	6	6	4	1.500	226	205	1.102	Second in each of the pools
12	F	Iran	3	2	1	5	7	6	1.167	313	302	1.036	Second in each of the pools
13	F	Argentina	3	1	2	4	7	8	0.875	351	347	1.012	Third in each of the pools
14	B	Cuba	3	1	2	4	6	7	0.857	281	302	0.930	Third in each of the pools
15	D	Germany	3	1	2	3	3	6	0.500	207	215	0.963	Third in each of the pools
16	A	Tunisia	3	1	2	3	3	6	0.500	189	210	0.900	Third in each of the pools
17	E	Canada	3	1	2	3	3	6	0.500	206	231	0.892	Third in each of the pools
18	C	Mexico	3	1	2	2	3	8	0.375	211	259	0.815	Third in each of the pools
19	F	Egypt	3	0	3	1	3	9	0.333	239	290	0.824	Fourth in each of the pools
20	C	Bulgaria	3	0	3	1	2	9	0.222	228	262	0.870	Fourth in each of the pools
21	B	Qatar	3	0	3	0	1	9	0.111	199	248	0.802	Fourth in each of the pools
22	A	Puerto Rico	3	0	3	0	1	9	0.111	197	250	0.788	Fourth in each of the pools
23	D	Cameroon	3	0	3	0	0	9	0.000	184	230	0.800	Fourth in each of the pools
24	E	China	3	0	3	0	0	9	0.000	153	225	0.680	Fourth in each of the pools

Source: WCH 2022 standings

== Final round ==
- All times are Central European Summer Time (UTC+02:00).
- FIVB reserved the first and second position for the host teams if they qualify for the final round. The better ranked host team secured the first position, and the worse ranked host team secured the second position.

Round of 16
4 September – Gliwice
1 Poland	3
16 Tunisia	0
4 September – Gliwice
8 United States	3
9 Turkey	2
6 September – Gliwice
4 Serbia	0
13 Argentina	3
6 September – Gliwice
5 Brazil	3
12 Iran	0
3 September – Ljubljana
2 Slovenia	3
15 Germany	1
5 September – Ljubljana
7 Netherlands	0
10 Ukraine	3
3 September – Ljubljana
3 Italy	3
14 Cuba	1
5 September – Ljubljana
6 France	3
11 Japan	2

Quarterfinals
8 September – Gliwice
Poland	3
United States	2
8 September – Gliwice
Argentina	1
Brazil	3
7 September – Ljubljana
Slovenia	3
Ukraine	1
7 September – Ljubljana
Italy	3
France	2

Semifinals
10 September – Katowice
Poland	3
Brazil	2
10 September – Katowice
Slovenia	0
Italy	3

Final
11 September – Katowice
Poland	1
Italy	3
3rd place match
11 September – Katowice
Brazil	3
Slovenia	1

=== Round of 16 ===
Date	Time	Venue		Score		Set 1	Set 2	Set 3	Set 4	Set 5	Total	Report
3 Sep	17:30	AST	Slovenia	3–1	Germany	25–18	25–19	21–25	25–22		96–84	P2 Report
3 Sep	21:15	AST	Italy	3–1	Cuba	25–21	21–25	26–24	25–18		97–88	P2 Report
4 Sep	17:30	GLA	United States	3–2	Turkey	25–21	25–17	22–25	19–25	15–12	106–100	P2 Report
4 Sep	21:00	GLA	Poland	3–0	Tunisia	25–20	25–15	25–20			75–55	P2 Report
5 Sep	17:30	AST	Netherlands	0–3	Ukraine	16–25	19–25	18–25			53–75	P2 Report
5 Sep	21:00	AST	France	3–2	Japan	25–17	21–25	26–24	22–25	18–16	112–107	P2 Report
6 Sep	17:30	GLA	Serbia	0–3	Argentina	23–25	21–25	23–25			67–75	P2 Report
6 Sep	21:00	GLA	Brazil	3–0	Iran	25–17	25–22	25–23			75–62	P2 Report

=== Quarterfinals ===
Date	Time	Venue		Score		Set 1	Set 2	Set 3	Set 4	Set 5	Total	Report
7 Sep	17:30	AST	Italy	3–2	France	24–26	25–21	23–25	25–22	15–12	112–106	P2 Report
7 Sep	21:00	AST	Slovenia	3–1	Ukraine	18–25	26–24	25–19	25–23		94–91	P2 Report
8 Sep	17:30	GLA	Argentina	1–3	Brazil	16–25	25–23	22–25	21–25		84–98	P2 Report
8 Sep	21:00	GLA	Poland	3–2	United States	25–20	27–25	21–25	22–25	15–12	110–107	P2 Report

=== Semifinals ===
Date	Time	Venue		Score		Set 1	Set 2	Set 3	Set 4	Set 5	Total	Report
10 Sep	18:00	SPO	Poland	3–2	Brazil	23–25	25–18	25–20	21–25	15–12	109–100	P2 Report
10 Sep	21:00	SPO	Italy	3–0	Slovenia	25–21	25–22	25–21			75–64	P2 Report

=== 3rd place match ===
Date	Time	Venue		Score		Set 1	Set 2	Set 3	Set 4	Set 5	Total	Report
11 Sep	18:00	SPO	Brazil	3–1	Slovenia	25–18	25–18	22–25	25–18		97–79	P2 Report

=== Final ===
Date	Time	Venue		Score		Set 1	Set 2	Set 3	Set 4	Set 5	Total	Report
11 Sep	21:00	SPO	Poland	1–3	Italy	25–22	21–25	18–25	20–25		84–97	P2 Report

== Final standing ==
Rank	Team
1st place, gold medalist(s)	Italy
2nd place, silver medalist(s)	Poland
3rd place, bronze medalist(s)	Brazil
4	Slovenia
5	France
6	United States
7	Ukraine
8	Argentina
9	Serbia
10	Netherlands
11	Turkey
12	Japan
13	Iran
14	Cuba
15	Germany
16	Tunisia
17	Canada
18	Mexico
19	Egypt
20	Bulgaria
21	Qatar
22	Puerto Rico
23	Cameroon
24	China

Qualified for the 2025 World Championship

Source: WCH 2022 final standings

2022 World Champions

Italy
Fourth title

Team roster: Giulio Pinali, Francesco Recine, Alessandro Michieletto, Simone Giannelli, Fabio Balaso, Riccardo Sbertoli, Mattia Bottolo, Gianluca Galassi, Daniele Lavia, Yuri Romanò, Simone Anzani, Roberto Russo, Leonardo Scanferla, Leandro Mosca
Head coach: Ferdinando De Giorgi

== Awards ==
- Most valuable player

Simone Giannelli (ITA)

- Best setter

Simone Giannelli (ITA)

- Best outside spikers

Yoandy Leal (BRA)
Kamil Semeniuk (POL)

- Best opposite spiker

Bartosz Kurek (POL)

- Best middle blockers

Mateusz Bieniek (POL)
Gianluca Galassi (ITA)

- Best libero

Fabio Balaso (ITA)

== Prize money ==
The champion of the tournament was rewarded with US$200,000. The second-place winner received US$125,000 while the third holder received US$75,000. Players selected into Dream Team received US$10,000 each while the MVP was given US$30,000.

== Statistics leaders ==
Statistics leaders correct as of final round.

Best Scorers
	Player	Spikes	Blocks	Serves	Total
1	(Brazil) Yoandy Leal	107	8	10	125
2	(Slovenia) Klemen Čebulj	95	13	6	114
3	(Italy) Daniele Lavia	91	10	2	103
4	(Poland) Bartosz Kurek	85	7	8	100
5	(Brazil) Wallace de Souza	85	9	3	97

Best Spikers
	Player	Spikes	Faults	Shots	%	Total
1	(Brazil) Yoandy Leal	107	24	72	52.61	203
2	(Slovenia) Klemen Čebulj	95	26	90	45.02	211
3	(Italy) Daniele Lavia	91	22	59	52.91	172
4	(Brazil) Wallace de Souza	85	31	57	49.13	173
5	(Poland) Bartosz Kurek	85	30	54	50.30	169

Best Blockers
	Player	Blocks	Faults	Rebounds	Avg	Total
1	(Argentina) Agustín Loser	17	30	2	3.40	49
2	(Brazil) Lucas Saatkamp	16	30	4	2.29	50
3	(Brazil) Flávio Gualberto	16	28	4	2.29	48
4	(Poland) Mateusz Bieniek	16	31	13	2.29	60
5	(Slovenia) Jan Kozamernik	15	29	8	2.14	52

Best Servers
	Player	Aces	Faults	Hits	Avg	Total
1	(Ukraine) Oleh Plotnytskyi	18	16	48	3.60	82
2	(Netherlands) Nimir Abdel-Aziz	12	27	35	3.00	74
3	(Poland) Mateusz Bieniek	11	16	78	1.57	105
4	(Brazil) Yoandy Leal	10	20	61	1.43	91
5	(Poland) Kamil Semeniuk	10	22	68	1.43	100

Best Setters
	Player	Running	Faults	Still	Avg	Total
1	(Italy) Simone Giannelli	139	3	376	19.86	518
2	(Argentina) Luciano De Cecco	131	3	314	26.20	448
3	(France) Antoine Brizard	107	3	286	21.40	396
4	(Poland) Marcin Janusz	94	3	428	13.43	525
5	(Germany) Lukas Kampa	87	0	187	21.75	274

Best Diggers
	Player	Digs	Faults	Receptions	Avg	Total
1	(Brazil) Thales Hoss	59	12	7	8.43	78
2	(Poland) Paweł Zatorski	52	15	6	7.43	73
3	(Italy) Fabio Balaso	48	19	11	6.68	78
4	(Slovenia) Jani Kovačič	39	17	5	5.57	61
5	(Argentina) Santiago Danani	30	10	4	6.00	44

Best Receivers
	Player	Excellents	Faults	Serve	%	Total
1	(Argentina) Santiago Danani	39	11	90	27.86	140
2	(France) Earvin N'Gapeth	35	1	74	31.82	110
3	(Netherlands) Robbert Andringa	34	3	49	39.53	86
4	(Argentina) Facundo Conte	34	3	81	28.81	118
5	(Brazil) Thales Hoss	33	6	87	26.19	126

== Broadcasting rights ==
FIVB, through several companies, sold the broadcasting rights for the 2022 World Championship to the following broadcasters.

The championship was screened through broadcast partnerships covering 90 territories around the world, while Volleyball World TV, Volleyball World's OTT platform, saw over 600,000 unique viewers watch 38.8 million minutes of action during the course of the competition.

Country/region	Broadcaster
Bosnia and Herzegovina	Sport Klub
Brazil	Grupo Globo
Bulgaria	BNT
Canada	CBC Sports
Caribbean	ESPN
China	CCTV
Croatia	Sport Klub
Cuba	ICRT
Egypt	Nile Sport, OnTime Sports
France	L'Équipe
Germany	Sky Sport
Indonesia	TVRI Sport
Iran	Islamic Republic of Iran Broadcasting
Israel	Charlton
Italy	RAI
Japan	Paravi
Kazakhstan	Saran Holding
Latin America	ESPN
Macedonia	Sport Klub
MENA	ASBU
Montenegro	Sport Klub
Morocco	SNRT
Netherlands	Ziggo Sport
Oman	Oman Sport
Poland	Polsat Sport, TVP
Puerto Rico	WAPA-TV
Serbia	Sport Klub
Slovenia	Sport Klub, Pop TV, Kanal A
Tunisia	El Watania 2
Turkey	TRT Spor
United Arab Emirates	Abu Dhabi Sports, Dubai Sports
Worldwide	Volleyball World TV

== See also ==
- 2022 FIVB Women's Volleyball World Championship
