= Alessandro Michieletto =

Italian volleyball player (born 2001)

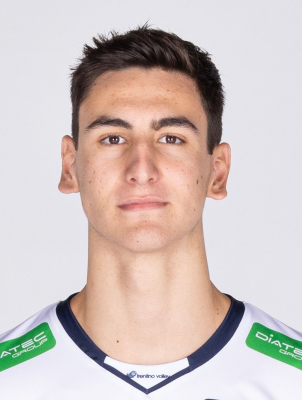
- Michieletto in 2021

Personal information
- Nationality: Italy
- Born: 5 December 2001 (age 24); Desenzano del Garda, Italy
- Height: 2.11 m (6 ft 11 in)
- Weight: 88 kg (194 lb)
- Spike: 375 cm (148 in)
- Block: 355 cm (140 in)

Volleyball information
- Position: Outside hitter
- Number: 5 (national team)

Career
Years	Teams
2018–2020; 2020–present	(Italy) Uni Trento (Italy) Itas Trentino

National team
2019–	Italy
Honours
Men's volleyball
Representing Italy
FIVB World Championship
Gold medal – first place	2022 Poland/Slovenia
Gold medal – first place	2025 Philippines
FIVB Nations League
Silver medal – second place	2025 Ningbo
CEV European Championship
Gold medal – first place	2021 Poland/Czechia/Estonia/Finland
Silver medal – second place	2023 Italy/Bulgaria/North Macedonia/Israel

Alessandro Michieletto (Italian pronunciation: [alesˈsandro mikjeˈletto]; born 5 December 2001) is an Italian professional volleyball player who plays as an outside hitter for Lega Pallavolo Serie A club Itas Trentino and the Italy national team.

== Career ==
Michieletto currently plays for Itas Trentino volleyball club as an outside hitter. His father, Riccardo Michieletto, is a former Italian volleyball player and his sister Francesca Michieletto also plays professional beach and indoor volleyball.

With the Italian national team, he was named to the 2020 Tokyo Olympics squad. In his Olympic debut versus Canada, he led all scorers with 24 points in Italy's five-set comeback win.

== Honors ==
=== Club ===
- 2022 FIVB Club World Championship
- 2021 FIVB Club World Championship
- 2021-2022 Italian SuperCup
- 2020-2021 CEV Champions League
- 2020-2021 Italian Serie A1
- 2020-2021 Italian Cup
- 2020-2021 Italian SuperCup
- 2018-2019 Italian Serie B Group B
- 2022-2023 Italian Cup
- 2022-2023 Italian Championship
- 2023-2024 CEV Champions League

=== Youth national team ===
- 2018 U18 European Championship
- 2019 2019 European Youth Olympic Festival
- 2019 U19 World Championship
- 2020 U20 European Championship
- 2021 U21 World Championship

=== National team ===
- 2021 CEV European Championship
- 2022 FIVB World Championship
- 2025 FIVB Nations League
- 2025 FIVB World Championship

=== Individual ===
- 2020: U20 European Championship - Most valuable player
- 2021: CEV European Championship – Best outside hitter
- 2021: U21 World Championship – Most valuable player
- 2021: FIVB Club World Championship – Best outside spiker
- 2022: FIVB Club World Championship – Best outside spiker
- 2024: CEV Champions League – Most valuable player
- 2025: FIVB Nations League – Best outside spiker
- 2025: FIVB World Championship – Best outside spiker
- 2025: FIVB World Championship – Most valuable player
- 2025: Volleyball World – Best World Men Volleyball Player of the Year 2025

Awards
Preceded by (Poland) Wilfredo León (Serbia) Uroš Kovačević	Best Outside Hitters of CEV European Championship; 2021 (with (Italy) Daniele Lavia)	Succeeded by Incumbent
Preceded by (Iran) Amir Hossein Esfandiar	Most Valuable Player of FIVB U21 World Championship; 2021	Succeeded by Incumbent
Preceded by (Italy) Osmany Juantorena (Argentina) Facundo Conte	Best Outside Spikers of FIVB Club World Championship; 2021 (with (Cuba) Miguel Ángel López)	Succeeded by Incumbent
