= 2021 Men's European Volleyball Championship =

Tournament details
- Host country: Poland; Czech Republic; Estonia; Finland
- Dates: 1–19 September
- Teams: 24 (from 1 confederation)
- Venue: 6 (in 6 host cities)

Final positions
- Champions: Italy (7th title)
- Runners-up: Slovenia
- Third place: Poland
- Fourth place: Serbia

Tournament awards
- MVP: (Italy) Simone Giannelli
- Best Setter: (Slovenia) Gregor Ropret
- Best OH: (Italy) Alessandro Michieletto (Italy) Daniele Lavia
- Best MB: (Serbia) Marko Podraščanin (Poland) Piotr Nowakowski
- Best OPP: (Netherlands) Nimir Abdel-Aziz
- Best Libero: (Italy) Fabio Balaso

Tournament statistics
- Matches played: 76
- Attendance: 195,448 (2,572 per match)

The 2021 Men's European Volleyball Championship was the 32nd edition of the Men's European Volleyball Championship, organised by Europe's governing volleyball body, CEV. For the second time, the EuroVolley was held in four countries: Poland, Czech Republic, Estonia and Finland. The number of national teams that participated in the event remained to 24.

In Poland, matches were played in Gdańsk, Katowice and Kraków. In Finland, matches were played in Tampere. In Czech Republic, matches were played in Ostrava. In Estonia, matches were played in Tallinn. The top two teams of the tournament qualified for the 2022 FIVB Volleyball Men's World Championship as the CEV representatives.

Italy won their 7th title of Men's European Volleyball Championship. Simone Giannelli was chosen as MVP of this tournament.

== Qualification ==
Means of qualification	Qualifier	Means of qualification		Qualifier
Host Countries	Poland	Qualification	Pool A	Netherlands
Host Countries	Czech Republic	Qualification	Pool B	Bulgaria
Host Countries	Estonia	Qualification	Pool C	Turkey
Host Countries	Finland	Qualification	Pool D	Latvia
2019 European Championship	Serbia	Qualification	Pool E	Slovakia
2019 European Championship	Slovenia	Qualification	Pool F	Montenegro
2019 European Championship	France	Qualification	Pool G	Portugal
2019 European Championship	Russia	Qualification	Best runners-up	North Macedonia
2019 European Championship	Italy	Qualification	Best runners-up	Spain
2019 European Championship	Ukraine	Qualification	Best runners-up	Greece
2019 European Championship	Germany	Qualification	Best runners-up	Croatia
2019 European Championship	Belgium	Qualification	Best runners-up	Belarus
Total 24

== Pools composition ==
The drawing of lots is combined with a seeding of National Federations and performed as follows:

1. The 4 Organisers are seeded in Preliminary pools. Poland in Pool A, Czech Republic in Pool B, Finland in Pool C and Estonia in Pool D.
2. The first and second best ranked from the previous edition of the CEV competition are drawn in different Preliminary pools,
3. The organizers can select one team to join their pools.
4. According to the CEV National Team ranking list (as per 01/01/2020), 16 remaining teams are seeded by descending order in a number of cups that equals the number of Preliminary pools.

Pot 1	Pot 2	Pot 3	Pot 4
Serbia; France; Slovenia; Netherlands	Germany; Bulgaria; Turkey; Ukraine	Spain; Slovakia; Greece; Belarus	Portugal; Montenegro; North Macedonia; Croatia

Draw

The drawing of lots was held on 27 May 2021 in Helsinki, Finland.

Pool A	Pool B	Pool C	Pool D
Poland	Czech Republic	Finland	Estonia
Belgium	Italy	Russia	Latvia
Serbia	Slovenia	Netherlands	France
Ukraine	Bulgaria	Turkey	Germany
Greece	Belarus	Spain	Slovakia
Portugal	Montenegro	North Macedonia	Croatia

== Venues ==
(Poland) Kraków (pool A)	(Poland) Gdańsk (round of 16, quarterfinals)	(Poland) Katowice (semifinals, finals)
Tauron Arena	Ergo Arena	Spodek
Capacity: 15,030	Capacity: 11,409	Capacity: 11,500
2021 Men's European Volleyball Championship is located in Europe
(Czech Republic) Ostrava (Pool B, Round of 16, Quarterfinals)	(Finland) Tampere (Pool C)	(Estonia) Tallinn (Pool D)
Ostravar Aréna	Tampere Ice Stadium	Saku Suurhall
Capacity: 10,000	Capacity: 7,300	Capacity: 7,200

== Pool standing procedure ==
1. Number of matches won
2. Match points
3. Sets ratio
4. Points ratio
5. If the tie continues as per the point ratio between two teams, the priority will be given to the team which won the match between them. When the tie in points ratio is between three or more teams, a new classification of these teams in the terms of points 1, 2, 3 and 4 will be made taking into consideration only the matches in which they were opposed to each other.

Match won 3–0 or 3–1: 3 match points for the winner, 0 match points for the loser
Match won 3–2: 2 match points for the winner, 1 match point for the loser

== Preliminary round ==
- The top four teams in each pool qualified for the final round.

=== Pool A ===
- All times are Central European Summer Time (UTC+02:00).

Pos	Team	Pld	W	L	Pts	SW	SL	SR	SPW	SPL	SPR	Qualification
1	Poland	5	5	0	14	15	4	3.750	453	381	1.189	Final round
2	Serbia	5	4	1	12	14	7	2.000	491	432	1.137	Final round
3	Ukraine	5	3	2	7	9	11	0.818	446	446	1.000	Final round
4	Portugal	5	2	3	6	10	12	0.833	459	502	0.914	Final round
5	Belgium	5	1	4	4	7	12	0.583	408	435	0.938	
6	Greece	5	0	5	2	6	15	0.400	434	495	0.877	

Source: CEV

Date	Time		Score		Set 1	Set 2	Set 3	Set 4	Set 5	Total	Report
2 Sep	14:30	Greece	2–3	Ukraine	25–22	24–26	25–22	19–25	6–15	99–110	Report
2 Sep	17:30	Poland	3–1	Portugal	25–16	22–25	25–16	25–19		97–76	Report
2 Sep	20:30	Belgium	1–3	Serbia	13–25	18–25	25–21	20–25		76–96	Report
3 Sep	17:30	Belgium	2–3	Portugal	23–25	22–25	25–20	25–18	13–15	108–103	Report
3 Sep	20:30	Ukraine	0–3	Serbia	25–27	24–26	21–25			70–78	Report
4 Sep	17:30	Belgium	3–0	Greece	25–16	25–22	25–22			75–60	Report
4 Sep	20:30	Serbia	2–3	Poland	21–25	25–23	25–20	20–25	14–16	105–109	Report
5 Sep	17:30	Portugal	2–3	Ukraine	18–25	23–25	25–21	26–24	11–15	103–110	Report
5 Sep	20:30	Greece	1–3	Poland	15–25	22–25	25–20	24–26		86–96	Report
6 Sep	17:30	Portugal	1–3	Serbia	15–25	21–25	25–22	17–25		78–97	Report
6 Sep	20:30	Poland	3–0	Belgium	25–18	26–24	25–16			76–58	Report
7 Sep	17:30	Serbia	3–2	Greece	25–23	22–25	25–16	28–30	15–5	115–99	Report
7 Sep	20:30	Ukraine	3–1	Belgium	25–27	25–23	25–18	25–23		100–91	Report
8 Sep	17:30	Poland	3–0	Ukraine	25–15	25–20	25–21			75–56	Report
8 Sep	20:30	Greece	1–3	Portugal	22–25	26–24	20–25	22–25		90–99	Report

=== Pool B ===
- All times are Central European Summer Time (UTC+02:00).

Pos	Team	Pld	W	L	Pts	SW	SL	SR	SPW	SPL	SPR	Qualification
1	Italy	5	5	0	15	15	2	7.500	418	336	1.244	Final round
2	Slovenia	5	3	2	9	10	6	1.667	379	329	1.152	Final round
3	Bulgaria	5	3	2	8	10	9	1.111	415	405	1.025	Final round
4	Czech Republic	5	2	3	7	10	10	1.000	438	446	0.982	Final round
5	Belarus	5	2	3	6	7	10	0.700	348	390	0.892	
6	Montenegro	5	0	5	0	0	15	0.000	291	383	0.760	

Source: CEV

Date	Time		Score		Set 1	Set 2	Set 3	Set 4	Set 5	Total	Report
3 Sep	14:15	Italy	3–0	Belarus	25–18	25–12	25–15			75–45	Report
3 Sep	17:15	Montenegro	0–3	Bulgaria	22–25	17–25	25–27			64–77	Report
3 Sep	20:15	Czech Republic	3–1	Slovenia	26–24	25–18	14–25	25–19		90–86	Report
4 Sep	16:00	Montenegro	0–3	Slovenia	17–25	16–25	16–25			49–75	Report
4 Sep	19:00	Belarus	3–1	Czech Republic	25–20	19–25	25–21	25–19		94–85	Report
5 Sep	16:00	Czech Republic	2–3	Bulgaria	10–25	25–23	25–18	24–26	11–15	95–107	Report
5 Sep	19:00	Italy	3–0	Montenegro	25–17	25–20	26–24			76–61	Report
6 Sep	15:45	Bulgaria	1–3	Italy	19–25	18–25	25–17	12–25		74–92	Report
6 Sep	19:00	Slovenia	3–0	Belarus	25–20	25–20	25–15			75–55	Report
7 Sep	16:00	Slovenia	3–0	Bulgaria	25–18	25–19	25–21			75–58	Report
7 Sep	19:00	Montenegro	0–3	Czech Republic	28–30	23–25	10–25			61–80	Report
8 Sep	15:45	Italy	3–0	Slovenia	27–25	25–20	25–23			77–68	Report
8 Sep	19:00	Belarus	3–0	Montenegro	25–23	25–21	25–12			75–56	Report
9 Sep	16:00	Bulgaria	3–1	Belarus	25–13	25–18	24–26	25–22		99–79	Report
9 Sep	19:00	Czech Republic	1–3	Italy	20–25	21–25	25–23	22–25		88–98	Report

=== Pool C ===
- All times are Eastern European Summer Time (UTC+03:00).

Pos	Team	Pld	W	L	Pts	SW	SL	SR	SPW	SPL	SPR	Qualification
1	Netherlands	5	4	1	13	14	5	2.800	447	425	1.052	Final round
2	Russia	5	4	1	11	13	7	1.857	464	396	1.172	Final round
3	Turkey	5	3	2	10	12	8	1.500	476	445	1.070	Final round
4	Finland	5	3	2	8	11	9	1.222	455	437	1.041	Final round
5	Spain	5	1	4	3	5	13	0.385	400	443	0.903	
6	North Macedonia	5	0	5	0	2	15	0.133	329	425	0.774	

Source: CEV

Date	Time		Score		Set 1	Set 2	Set 3	Set 4	Set 5	Total	Report
1 Sep	19:00	Finland	3–1	North Macedonia	25–20	25–15	24–26	25–22		99–83	Report
2 Sep	17:00	Russia	1–3	Turkey	27–29	25–16	21–25	19–25		92–95	Report
2 Sep	20:00	Netherlands	3–0	Spain	25–23	26–24	25–22			76–69	Report
3 Sep	17:00	Turkey	3–1	Spain	25–16	29–31	27–25	25–23		106–95	Report
3 Sep	20:00	Netherlands	3–0	North Macedonia	25–20	25–18	25–22			75–60	Report
4 Sep	14:00	Spain	0–3	Finland	19–25	20–25	18–25			57–75	Report
4 Sep	17:30	Netherlands	2–3	Russia	13–25	25–19	21–25	25–21	13–15	97–105	Report
5 Sep	14:00	North Macedonia	0–3	Turkey	22–25	12–25	15–25			49–75	Report
5 Sep	17:30	Russia	3–1	Finland	22–25	25–15	25–23	25–17		97–80	Report
6 Sep	17:00	North Macedonia	1–3	Spain	23–25	25–21	28–30	15–25		91–101	Report
6 Sep	20:00	Turkey	1–3	Netherlands	25–22	25–27	25–27	23–25		98–101	Report
7 Sep	17:00	Spain	1–3	Russia	20–25	25–20	16–25	17–25		78–95	Report
7 Sep	20:00	Finland	1–3	Netherlands	23–25	25–21	25–27	20–25		93–98	Report
8 Sep	17:00	Russia	3–0	North Macedonia	25–15	25–13	25–18			75–46	Report
8 Sep	20:00	Finland	3–2	Turkey	25–17	16–25	27–29	25–18	15–13	108–102	Report

=== Pool D ===
- All times are Eastern European Summer Time (UTC+03:00).

Pos	Team	Pld	W	L	Pts	SW	SL	SR	SPW	SPL	SPR	Qualification
1	France	5	5	0	15	15	1	15.000	397	317	1.252	Final round
2	Germany	5	4	1	11	13	6	2.167	463	389	1.190	Final round
3	Croatia	5	3	2	7	9	11	0.818	443	461	0.961	Final round
4	Latvia	5	1	4	5	8	13	0.615	434	489	0.888	Final round
5	Slovakia	5	1	4	4	8	14	0.571	453	502	0.902	
6	Estonia	5	1	4	3	6	14	0.429	414	446	0.928	

Source: CEV

Date	Time		Score		Set 1	Set 2	Set 3	Set 4	Set 5	Total	Report
1 Sep	19:00	Estonia	1–3	Latvia	23–25	22–25	25–16	21–25		91–91	Report
3 Sep	17:00	Croatia	0–3	Germany	20–25	13–25	19–25			52–75	Report
3 Sep	20:00	France	3–0	Slovakia	25–22	25–20	25–19			75–61	Report
4 Sep	16:00	Slovakia	2–3	Estonia	27–25	25–22	18–25	14–25	13–15	97–112	Report
4 Sep	19:00	Croatia	3–2	Latvia	28–30	25–20	23–25	31–29	15–11	122–115	Report
5 Sep	16:00	Estonia	0–3	Germany	19–25	16–25	21–25			56–75	Report
5 Sep	19:00	France	3–0	Croatia	25–15	25–16	26–24			76–55	Report
6 Sep	17:00	Latvia	2–3	Slovakia	18–25	25–23	25–13	19–25	7–15	94–101	Report
6 Sep	20:00	Germany	1–3	France	29–31	25–15	22–25	22–25		98–96	Report
7 Sep	17:00	Latvia	1–3	Germany	22–25	19–25	27–25	17–25		85–100	Report
7 Sep	20:00	Croatia	3–2	Estonia	20–25	22–25	25–18	26–24	15–9	108–101	Report
8 Sep	17:00	Slovakia	1–3	Croatia	27–25	19–25	19–25	29–31		94–106	Report
8 Sep	20:00	France	3–0	Latvia	25–18	25–14	25–17			75–49	Report
9 Sep	17:00	Germany	3–2	Slovakia	25–20	25–17	25–27	25–27	15–9	115–100	Report
9 Sep	20:00	Estonia	0–3	France	18–25	17–25	19–25			54–75	Report

== Final round ==
- All times are Central European Summer Time (UTC+02:00).

Round of 16
11 September – Gdańsk
Poland	3
Finland	0
11 September – Gdańsk
Russia	3
Ukraine	1
13 September – Ostrava
France	0
Czech Republic	3
13 September – Ostrava
Slovenia	3
Croatia	1
12 September – Gdańsk
Netherlands	3
Portugal	2
12 September – Gdańsk
Serbia	3
Turkey	2
12 September – Ostrava
Italy	3
Latvia	0
12 September – Ostrava
Germany	3
Bulgaria	1

Quarterfinals
14 September – Gdańsk
Poland	3
Russia	0
15 September – Ostrava
Czech Republic	0
Slovenia	3
14 September – Gdańsk
Netherlands	0
Serbia	3
15 September – Ostrava
Italy	3
Germany	0

Semifinals
18 September – Katowice
Poland	1
Slovenia	3
18 September – Katowice
Serbia	1
Italy	3

Final
19 September – Katowice
Slovenia	2
Italy	3
3rd place match
19 September – Katowice
Poland	3
Serbia	0

=== Round of 16 ===
Date	Time	Venue		Score		Set 1	Set 2	Set 3	Set 4	Set 5	Total	Report
11 Sep	17:30	ERA	Russia	3–1	Ukraine	22–25	25–16	25–22	25–22		97–85	Report
11 Sep	20:30	ERA	Poland	3–0	Finland	25–16	25–16	25–14			75–46	Report
12 Sep	16:00	OSA	Italy	3–0	Latvia	25–14	25–13	25–16			75–43	Report
12 Sep	17:30	ERA	Netherlands	3–2	Portugal	22–25	25–22	26–24	20–25	15–13	108–109	Report
12 Sep	19:00	OSA	Germany	3–1	Bulgaria	25–14	18–25	25–19	25–22		93–80	Report
12 Sep	20:30	ERA	Serbia	3–2	Turkey	25–18	22–25	22–25	25–23	15–12	109–103	Report
13 Sep	16:00	OSA	Slovenia	3–1	Croatia	25–20	25–18	19–25	25–12		94–75	Report
13 Sep	19:00	OSA	France	0–3	Czech Republic	22–25	19–25	32–34			73–84	Report

=== Quarterfinals ===
Date	Time	Venue		Score		Set 1	Set 2	Set 3	Set 4	Set 5	Total	Report
14 Sep	17:30	ERA	Netherlands	0–3	Serbia	23–25	20–25	25–27			68–77	Report
14 Sep	20:30	ERA	Poland	3–0	Russia	25–14	26–24	25–19			76–57	Report
15 Sep	16:00	OSA	Italy	3–0	Germany	25–13	25–18	25–19			75–50	Report
15 Sep	19:00	OSA	Czech Republic	0–3	Slovenia	21–25	19–25	25–27			65–77	Report

=== Semifinals ===
Date	Time	Venue		Score		Set 1	Set 2	Set 3	Set 4	Set 5	Total	Report
18 Sep	17:30	SPO	Poland	1–3	Slovenia	25–17	30–32	16–25	35–37		106–111	Report
18 Sep	21:00	SPO	Serbia	1–3	Italy	27–29	22–25	25–23	18–25		92–102	Report

=== 3rd place match ===
Date	Time	Venue		Score		Set 1	Set 2	Set 3	Set 4	Set 5	Total	Report
19 Sep	17:30	SPO	Poland	3–0	Serbia	25–22	25–16	25–22			75–60	Report

=== Final ===
Date	Time	Venue		Score		Set 1	Set 2	Set 3	Set 4	Set 5	Total	Report
19 Sep	20:30	SPO	Slovenia	2–3	Italy	25–22	20–25	25–20	20–25	11–15	101–107	Report

== Final standing ==
Rank	Team
1st place, gold medalist(s)	Italy
2nd place, silver medalist(s)	Slovenia
3rd place, bronze medalist(s)	Poland
4	Serbia
5	Netherlands
6	Germany
7	Russia
8	Czech Republic
9	France
10	Turkey
11	Bulgaria
12	Finland
13	Ukraine
14	Croatia
15	Portugal
16	Latvia
17	Belarus
18	Belgium
19	Slovakia
20	Spain
21	Estonia
22	Greece
23	North Macedonia
24	Montenegro

Qualified for the 2022 World Championship

2021 Men's European champions

Italy
7th title

14-man roster
Simone Giannelli (c), Fabio Balaso, Gianluca Galassi, Riccardo Sbertoli, Yuri Romanò, Simone Anzani, Alessandro Michieletto, Daniele Lavia, Alessandro Piccinelli, Fabio Ricci, Giulio Pinali, Lorenzo Cortesia, Francesco Recine, Mattia Bottolo
Head coach
Ferdinando De Giorgi

== All Star Team ==
This list was based on 375,394 fan votes.

- Most valuable player
  (Italy) Simone Giannelli
- Best setter
  (Slovenia) Gregor Ropret
- Best outside hitters
  (Italy) Alessandro Michieletto
  (Italy) Daniele Lavia
- Best middle blockers
  (Serbia) Marko Podraščanin
  (Poland) Piotr Nowakowski
- Best opposite
  (Netherlands) Nimir Abdel-Aziz
- Best libero
  (Italy) Fabio Balaso

== See also ==
- 2021 Women's European Volleyball Championship
