= 2023 Men's European Volleyball Championship =

Tournament details
- Host countries: Italy; Bulgaria; North Macedonia; Israel
- Dates: 28 August – 16 September 2023
- Teams: 24 (from 1 confederation)
- Venue: 8 (in 8 host cities)

Final positions
- Champions: Poland (2nd title)
- Runners-up: Italy
- Third place: Slovenia
- Fourth place: France

Tournament awards
- MVP: (Poland) Wilfredo León
- Best Setter: (Poland) Marcin Janusz
- Best OH: (Poland) Wilfredo León; (Italy) Daniele Lavia
- Best MB: (Poland) Norbert Huber; (Turkey) Bedirhan Bülbül
- Best OPP: (Poland) Łukasz Kaczmarek
- Best Libero: (Poland) Paweł Zatorski

Tournament statistics
- Matches played: 76
- Attendance: 184,799 (2,432 per match)

The 2023 Men's European Volleyball Championship was the 33rd edition of the Men's European Volleyball Championship, organised by Europe's governing volleyball body, CEV. For the third time, the championship was held in four countries: Italy, Bulgaria, North Macedonia and Israel. The top three teams of the tournament qualified for the 2025 FIVB Volleyball Men's World Championship as the CEV representatives, except Italy who had already qualified as the defending world champions.

Poland won their second title after defeating hosts Italy 3–0 in the final. Wilfredo León was chosen as the MVP of the tournament.

== Host selection ==
In May 2022, three countries — Bulgaria, Italy and North Macedonia — confirmed their co-hosting of the men's EuroVolley 2023 edition. Ukraine was also supposed to be one of the hosts of EuroVolley but because of the ongoing war in the country they lost the right to host the tournament. The only arena that was suitable for the championships was indoor arena Yunist in Zaporizhzhia.

On 5 October 2022, CEV announced that Israel would be the new co-host of the tournament replacing Ukraine. In July 2023, CEV made the unprecedented and controversial move of donating €1,500,000 to ensure the smooth running of the EuroVolley 2023 Group D stages in Israel amid rumours that Israel might withdraw from its hosting duties due to "financial difficulties". This is in contrast to the other host nations who reportedly spent between €600,000 and €2,000,000 for the organization of the championship.

On 9 February 2023, CEV announced that Rome would host the semifinals and medal matches, while Bologna would also host the opening match between Belgium and Italy.

== Qualification ==
Means of qualification	Qualifier	Means of qualification		Qualifier
Host Countries	Italy	Qualification	Pool A	Turkey
Host Countries	North Macedonia	Qualification	Pool B	Finland
Host Countries	Bulgaria	Qualification	Pool C	Belgium
Host Countries	Israel	Qualification	Pool D	Portugal
2021 European Championship	Slovenia	Qualification	Pool E	Greece
2021 European Championship	Poland	Qualification	Pool F	Spain
2021 European Championship	Serbia	Qualification	Pool G	Romania
2021 European Championship	Netherlands	Qualification	Best runners-up	Switzerland
2021 European Championship	Germany	Qualification	Best runners-up	Denmark
2021 European Championship	Czech Republic	Qualification	Best runners-up	Montenegro
2021 European Championship	France	Qualification	Best runners-up	Estonia
Reallocation	Ukraine	Qualification	Best runners-up	Croatia
Total 24

== Pools composition ==
The drawing of lots is combined with a seeding of National Federations and performed as follows:

1. The 4 Organisers are seeded in Preliminary pools. Italy in Pool A, Bulgaria in Pool B, North Macedoniain Pool C and Israel in Pool D.
2. The first and second best ranked from the previous edition of the CEV competition are drawn in different Preliminary pools,
3. The organizers could select one team to join their pools, as a result, Switzerland joined Italy in Pool A, Finland joined Bulgaria in Pool B, Montenegro joined North Macedonia in Pool C and Romania joined Israel in Pool D.
4. According to the CEV National Team rankings as of 1 January 2022, the 16 remaining teams are seeded by descending order in a number of cups that equals the number of Preliminary pools.

Pot 1	Pot 2	Pot 3	Pot 4
Poland; France; Serbia; Slovenia	Germany; Netherlands; Turkey; Ukraine	Czech Republic; Portugal; Belgium; Croatia	Spain; Greece; Estonia; Denmark

Draw

The drawing of lots was held on 16 November 2022 in Naples, Italy.

- CEV EuroVolley 2023 – Drawing of Lots
- Drawing of Lots Live Streaming

Pool A	Pool B	Pool C	Pool D
Italy	Bulgaria	North Macedonia	Israel
Switzerland	Finland	Montenegro	Romania
Serbia	Slovenia	Poland	France
Germany	Ukraine	Netherlands	Turkey
Belgium	Croatia	Czech Republic	Portugal
Estonia	Spain	Denmark	Greece

== Venues ==
(Italy) Rome (Semifinals and Finals)	(Bulgaria) Varna (Pool B, Round of 16 and Quarterfinals)	(North Macedonia) Skopje (Pool C)	(Israel) Tel Aviv (Pool D)
PalaLottomatica	Palace of Culture and Sports	Boris Trajkovski Sports Center	Shlomo Group Arena
Capacity: 11,000	Capacity: 5,116	Capacity: 10,000	Capacity: 3,400
2023 Men's European Volleyball Championship is located in Europe
(Italy) Bologna (Pool A) (only 28 August)	(Italy) Perugia (Pool A) (30 August-1 September)	(Italy) Ancona (Pool A) (3-6 September)	(Italy) Bari (Round of 16 and Quarterfinals)
Capacity: 11,000	Capacity: 6,000	Capacity: 5,000	Capacity: 6,000
Unipol Arena	PalaEvangelisti	PalaRossini	PalaFlorio

== Pool standing procedure ==
1. Number of matches won
2. Match points
3. Sets ratio
4. Points ratio
5. If the tie continues as per the point ratio between two teams, the priority is given to the team which won the match between them. When the tie in points ratio is between three or more teams, a new classification of these teams in the terms of points 1, 2, 3 and 4 is made taking into consideration only the matches in which they were opposed to each other.

Match won 3–0 or 3–1: 3 match points for the winner, 0 match points for the loser
Match won 3–2: 2 match points for the winner, 1 match point for the loser

== Preliminary round ==
- All times are local.
- The top four teams in each pool qualify for the final round.

=== Pool A ===
- All times are Central European Summer Time (UTC+02:00).

Pos	Team	Pld	W	L	Pts	SW	SL	SR	SPW	SPL	SPR	Qualification
1	Italy (H)	5	5	0	14	15	2	7.500	402	326	1.233	Final round
2	Serbia	5	4	1	12	12	5	2.400	393	365	1.077	Final round
3	Germany	5	3	2	9	12	8	1.500	448	407	1.101	Final round
4	Belgium	5	2	3	7	9	10	0.900	398	412	0.966	Final round
5	Estonia	5	1	4	2	4	14	0.286	366	414	0.884	
6	Switzerland	5	0	5	1	2	15	0.133	325	408	0.797	

Source: CEV
(H) Host

Date	Time		Score		Set 1	Set 2	Set 3	Set 4	Set 5	Total	Report
28 Aug	20:00	Belgium	0–3	Italy	17–25	18–25	15–25			50–75	P2 Report
30 Aug	18:00	Germany	3–0	Estonia	25–22	25–19	25–19			75–60	P2 Report
30 Aug	21:00	Switzerland	0–3	Serbia	19–25	16–25	19–25			54–75	P2 Report
31 Aug	18:00	Serbia	3–1	Belgium	25–22	18–25	25–20	25–20		93–87	P2 Report
31 Aug	21:00	Estonia	0–3	Italy	17–25	22–25	19–25			58–75	P2 Report
1 Sep	18:00	Germany	3–0	Switzerland	25–14	25–16	25–21			75–51	P2 Report
1 Sep	21:00	Serbia	0–3	Italy	15–25	19–25	21–25			55–75	P2 Report
3 Sep	18:00	Estonia	3–2	Switzerland	25–18	25–21	22–25	21–25	15–13	108–102	P2 Report
3 Sep	21:00	Belgium	2–3	Germany	25–22	25–17	15–25	22–25	12–15	99–104	P2 Report
4 Sep	18:00	Serbia	3–0	Estonia	25–16	25–23	25–22			75–61	P2 Report
4 Sep	21:00	Italy	3–0	Switzerland	25–19	25–23	25–15			75–57	P2 Report
5 Sep	18:00	Belgium	3–1	Estonia	25–18	25–17	12–25	25–19		87–79	P2 Report
5 Sep	21:00	Germany	1–3	Serbia	22–25	25–20	22–25	19–25		88–95	P2 Report
6 Sep	18:00	Switzerland	0–3	Belgium	20–25	19–25	22–25			61–75	P2 Report
6 Sep	21:15	Germany	2–3	Italy	22–25	25–23	22–25	25–14	12–15	106–102	P2 Report

=== Pool B ===
Pos	Team	Pld	W	L	Pts	SW	SL	SR	SPW	SPL	SPR	Qualification
1	Slovenia	5	5	0	15	15	1	15.000	411	328	1.253	Final round
2	Croatia	5	3	2	8	9	9	1.000	383	395	0.970	Final round
3	Ukraine	5	2	3	6	10	11	0.909	459	460	0.998	Final round
4	Bulgaria (H)	5	2	3	6	8	11	0.727	437	458	0.954	Final round
5	Spain	5	2	3	6	6	11	0.545	361	397	0.909	
6	Finland	5	1	4	4	7	12	0.583	423	436	0.970	

Source: CEV
(H) Host

Date	Time		Score		Set 1	Set 2	Set 3	Set 4	Set 5	Total	Report
29 Aug	19:30	Spain	3–1	Bulgaria	25–17	25–21	21–25	25–19		96–82	P2 Report
30 Aug	16:30	Slovenia	3–1	Ukraine	23–25	25–22	25–20	25–20		98–87	P2 Report
30 Aug	19:30	Finland	3–0	Croatia	25–19	25–19	25–22			75–60	P2 Report
31 Aug	16:30	Ukraine	2–3	Croatia	25–17	22–25	25–20	15–25	13–15	100–102	P2 Report
31 Aug	19:30	Finland	1–3	Bulgaria	26–28	25–27	25–15	16–25		92–95	P2 Report
1 Sep	16:30	Finland	0–3	Slovenia	21–25	19–25	22–25			62–75	P2 Report
1 Sep	19:30	Croatia	3–0	Spain	25–19	25–20	25–22			75–61	P2 Report
2 Sep	16:30	Slovenia	3–0	Spain	25–19	25–15	25–15			75–49	P2 Report
2 Sep	19:30	Bulgaria	3–1	Ukraine	20–25	25–17	25–20	25–23		95–85	P2 Report
3 Sep	16:30	Spain	3–1	Finland	25–21	19–25	25–21	25–23		94–90	P2 Report
3 Sep	19:30	Bulgaria	1–3	Croatia	25–22	16–25	22–25	21–25		84–97	P2 Report
4 Sep	16:30	Ukraine	3–2	Finland	25–23	25–17	23–25	24–26	15–13	112–104	P2 Report
4 Sep	19:30	Croatia	0–3	Slovenia	17–25	18–25	14–25			49–75	P2 Report
5 Sep	17:30	Spain	0–3	Ukraine	21–25	21–25	19–25			61–75	P2 Report
5 Sep	20:30	Slovenia	3–0	Bulgaria	31–29	25–22	32–30			88–81	P2 Report

=== Pool C ===
Pos	Team	Pld	W	L	Pts	SW	SL	SR	SPW	SPL	SPR	Qualification
1	Poland	5	5	0	15	15	1	15.000	398	272	1.463	Final round
2	Netherlands	5	4	1	12	13	4	3.250	403	364	1.107	Final round
3	Czech Republic	5	3	2	9	9	7	1.286	375	351	1.068	Final round
4	North Macedonia (H)	5	2	3	6	6	10	0.600	332	373	0.890	Final round
5	Montenegro	5	1	4	3	3	13	0.231	308	399	0.772	
6	Denmark	5	0	5	0	4	15	0.267	415	472	0.879	

Source: CEV
(H) Host

Date	Time		Score		Set 1	Set 2	Set 3	Set 4	Set 5	Total	Report
30 Aug	20:00	North Macedonia	3–1	Denmark	22–25	25–22	25–19	25–22		97–88	P2 Report
31 Aug	17:00	Montenegro	0–3	Netherlands	19–25	18–25	22–25			59–75	P2 Report
31 Aug	20:00	Poland	3–0	Czech Republic	25–17	25–20	25–20			75–57	P2 Report
1 Sep	17:00	Denmark	1–3	Czech Republic	15–25	25–23	27–29	22–25		89–102	P2 Report
1 Sep	20:00	Netherlands	1–3	Poland	25–23	13–25	19–25	22–25		79–98	P2 Report
2 Sep	17:00	Netherlands	3–0	Czech Republic	25–22	25–22	25–22			75–66	P2 Report
2 Sep	20:00	North Macedonia	3–0	Montenegro	25–22	25–18	25–20			75–60	P2 Report
3 Sep	17:00	Denmark	1–3	Montenegro	25–18	29–31	22–25	23–25		99–99	P2 Report
3 Sep	20:00	Poland	3–0	North Macedonia	25–12	25–21	25–14			75–47	P2 Report
4 Sep	17:00	Denmark	1–3	Netherlands	18–25	24–26	25–23	20–25		87–99	P2 Report
4 Sep	20:00	Czech Republic	3–0	Montenegro	25–18	25–20	25–15			75–53	P2 Report
5 Sep	17:00	North Macedonia	0–3	Netherlands	19–25	19–25	16–25			54–75	P2 Report
5 Sep	20:00	Poland	3–0	Denmark	25–23	25–9	25–20			75–52	P2 Report
6 Sep	17:00	Montenegro	0–3	Poland	14–25	11–25	12–25			37–75	P2 Report
6 Sep	20:00	North Macedonia	0–3	Czech Republic	19–25	23–25	17–25			59–75	P2 Report

=== Pool D ===
Pos	Team	Pld	W	L	Pts	SW	SL	SR	SPW	SPL	SPR	Qualification
1	France	5	4	1	12	13	4	3.250	423	369	1.146	Final round
2	Portugal	5	3	2	9	12	8	1.500	435	434	1.002	Final round
3	Romania	5	3	2	9	11	10	1.100	462	450	1.027	Final round
4	Turkey	5	2	3	8	10	10	1.000	467	439	1.064	Final round
5	Israel (H)	5	2	3	4	6	13	0.462	386	439	0.879	
6	Greece	5	1	4	3	7	14	0.500	440	482	0.913	

Source: CEV
(H) Host

Date	Time		Score		Set 1	Set 2	Set 3	Set 4	Set 5	Total	Report
29 Aug	19:00	Greece	2–3	Israel	17–25	29–27	25–21	21–25	13–15	105–113	P2 Report
30 Aug	16:00	Turkey	0–3	France	20–25	28–30	25–27			73–82	P2 Report
30 Aug	19:00	Romania	0–3	Portugal	19–25	18–25	23–25			60–75	P2 Report
31 Aug	16:00	France	3–1	Portugal	25–21	25–27	25–19	25–15		100–82	P2 Report
31 Aug	19:00	Romania	2–3	Israel	25–27	25–12	25–21	22–25	8–15	105–100	P2 Report
1 Sep	15:00	Romania	3–2	Turkey	25–22	18–25	25–21	23–25	17–15	108–108	P2 Report
1 Sep	18:00	Portugal	2–3	Greece	25–22	25–19	20–25	16–25	12–15	98–106	P2 Report
2 Sep	16:30	Turkey	3–1	Greece	22–25	26–24	25–19	25–23		98–91	P2 Report
2 Sep	19:30	Israel	0–3	France	21–25	27–29	17–25			65–79	P2 Report
3 Sep	16:00	Greece	1–3	Romania	16–25	18–25	25–23	21–25		80–98	P2 Report
3 Sep	19:00	Israel	0–3	Portugal	22–25	21–25	12–25			55–75	P2 Report
4 Sep	16:00	France	1–3	Romania	23–25	25–16	18–25	21–25		87–91	P2 Report
4 Sep	19:00	Portugal	3–2	Turkey	26–24	21–25	15–25	28–26	15–13	105–113	P2 Report
5 Sep	16:00	Greece	0–3	France	19–25	22–25	17–25			58–75	P2 Report
5 Sep	19:00	Turkey	3–0	Israel	25–23	25–13	25–17			75–53	P2 Report

== Final round ==
- All times are local.

Round of 16
9 September – Bari
Italy	3
North Macedonia	0
9 September – Bari
Netherlands	3
Germany	2
8 September – Varna
France	3
Bulgaria	0
8 September – Varna
Croatia	2
Romania	3
10 September – Bari
Poland	3
Belgium	1
10 September – Bari
Serbia	3
Czech Republic	0
9 September – Varna
Slovenia	3
Turkey	2
9 September – Varna
Portugal	0
Ukraine	3

Quarterfinals
12 September – Bari
Italy	3
Netherlands	2
11 September – Varna
France	3
Romania	0
12 September – Bari
Poland	3
Serbia	1
11 September – Varna
Slovenia	3
Ukraine	1

Semifinals
14 September – Rome
Italy	3
France	0
14 September – Rome
Poland	3
Slovenia	1

Final
16 September – Rome
Italy	0
Poland	3
3rd place match
16 September – Rome
France	2
Slovenia	3

=== Round of 16 ===
Date	Time		Score		Set 1	Set 2	Set 3	Set 4	Set 5	Total	Report
8 Sep	17:30	Croatia	2–3	Romania	17–25	20–25	25–17	28–26	12–15	102–108	P2 Report
8 Sep	20:30	France	3–0	Bulgaria	25–21	25–21	25–15			75–57	P2 Report
9 Sep	17:30	Slovenia	3–2	Turkey	20–25	22–25	25–21	25–23	15–13	107–107	P2 Report
9 Sep	18:00	Italy	3–0	North Macedonia	25–20	25–12	25–15			75–47	P2 Report
9 Sep	20:30	Portugal	0–3	Ukraine	20–25	19–25	22–25			61–75	P2 Report
9 Sep	21:00	Netherlands	3–2	Germany	25–20	25–23	22–25	18–25	15–12	105–105	P2 Report
10 Sep	18:00	Serbia	3–0	Czech Republic	25–21	26–24	25–21			76–66	P2 Report
10 Sep	21:00	Poland	3–1	Belgium	25–16	25–17	23–25	25–22		98–80	P2 Report

=== Quarterfinals ===
Date	Time		Score		Set 1	Set 2	Set 3	Set 4	Set 5	Total	Report
11 Sep	17:30	Slovenia	3–1	Ukraine	25–17	31–29	21–25	25–23		102–94	P2 Report
11 Sep	21:00	France	3–0	Romania	25–22	25–14	27–25			77–61	P2 Report
12 Sep	18:00	Poland	3–1	Serbia	26–28	25–15	36–34	25–17		112–94	P2 Report
12 Sep	21:00	Italy	3–2	Netherlands	19–25	25–17	25–16	23–25	15–12	107–95	P2 Report

=== Semifinals ===
Date	Time		Score		Set 1	Set 2	Set 3	Set 4	Set 5	Total	Report
14 Sep	18:00	Poland	3–1	Slovenia	23–25	25–21	25–20	25–21		98–87	P2 Report
14 Sep	21:15	Italy	3–0	France	25–21	25–19	25–23			75–63	P2 Report

=== 3rd place match ===
Date	Time		Score		Set 1	Set 2	Set 3	Set 4	Set 5	Total	Report
16 Sep	17:30	France	2–3	Slovenia	22–25	16–25	25–21	25–18	11–15	99–104	P2 Report

=== Final ===
Date	Time		Score		Set 1	Set 2	Set 3	Set 4	Set 5	Total	Report
16 Sep	21:00	Italy	0–3	Poland	20–25	21–25	23–25			64–75	P2 Report

== Final standing ==
Rank	Team
1st place, gold medalist(s)	Poland
2nd place, silver medalist(s)	Italy
3rd place, bronze medalist(s)	Slovenia
4	France
5	Netherlands
6	Serbia
7	Romania
8	Ukraine
9	Germany
10	Portugal
11	Croatia
12	Czech Republic
13	Turkey
14	Belgium
15	Bulgaria
16	North Macedonia
17	Spain
18	Israel
19	Montenegro
20	Estonia
21	Finland
22	Greece
23	Switzerland
24	Denmark

Qualified for the 2025 World Championship
Qualified for the 2025 World Championship as defending champions
Qualified for the 2025 World Championship via FIVB World Ranking

2023 Men's European champions

Poland
2nd title

14-man roster
Bartosz Kurek (c), Jakub Popiwczak, Łukasz Kaczmarek, Karol Kłos, Wilfredo León, Bartosz Bednorz, Aleksander Śliwka, Grzegorz Łomacz, Jakub Kochanowski, Kamil Semeniuk, Paweł Zatorski, Marcin Janusz, Tomasz Fornal, Norbert Huber
Head coach
Nikola Grbić

== See also ==
- 2023 Women's European Volleyball Championship
