= Matteo Piano =

Italian volleyball player (born 1990)

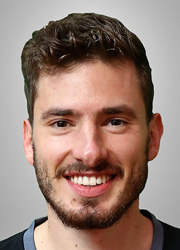

Personal information
- Born: 24 October 1990 (age 36); Asti, Italy
- Height: 2.09 m (6 ft 10 in)
- Weight: 101 kg (223 lb)
- Spike: 349 cm (137 in)
- Block: 320 cm (126 in)

Volleyball information
- Position: Middle blocker
- Current team: Revivre Milano
- Number: 11

Career
Years	Teams
2006–2009; 2009–2011; 2011–2014; 2014–2017; 2017–	Volley Asti; Copra Elior Piacenza; Altotevere Città di Castello; Azimut Modena; Revivre Milano

National team
2013–	Italy
Honours
Men's volleyball
Representing Italy
Olympic Games
Olympic Games
Silver medal – second place	2016 Rio de Janeiro	Team
World Cup
Silver medal – second place	2015 Japan
World Grand Champions Cup
Silver medal – second place	2017 Japan
Bronze medal – third place	2013 Japan
World League
Bronze medal – third place	2013 Mar del Plata
Bronze medal – third place	2014 Florence
European Championship
Silver medal – second place	2013 Denmark/Poland
Bronze medal – third place	2015 Bulgaria/Italy

Matteo Piano (born 24 October 1990) is an Italian volleyball player, a member of Italy men's national volleyball team and Revivre Milano. Matteo Piano has a standing reach of 209 cm. He was silver medalist at the 2016 Olympics and the 2015 World Cup, silver medalist at the European Championship 2013, and bronze medalist of the World League (2013, 2014).

== Career ==
=== National team ===
Piano debuted with the Italy men's national volleyball team in 2013. In 2013 Italy, including Piano, won bronze medal of World League. In the same year he achieved silver medal of European Championship. In 2014 he and his Italian teammates won bronze of World League held in Florence, Italy. He was also part of the team that won the silver medal in the 2016 Summer Olympics and in the 2017 FIVB Volleyball Men's World Grand Champions Cup.

== Sporting achievements ==
=== Clubs ===
==== National championships ====
- 2014/2015 Italian Cup, with Modena Volley
- 2015/2016 Italian Cup, with DHL Modena

=== National team ===
- 2013 FIVB World League
- 2013 CEV European Championship
- 2014 FIVB World League
- 2015 FIVB World Cup
- 2016 Olympic Games

=== Individual ===
- 2017 FIVB World Grand Champions Cup – Best Middle Blocker

Awards
Preceded by (United States) Maxwell Holt and (Italy) Emanuele Birarelli	Best Middle Blocker of World Grand Champions Cup; 2017 ex aequo (Brazil) Lucas Saatkamp	Succeeded by TBD
