= 2017 FIVB Volleyball Men's World Grand Champions Cup =

Volleyball competition held in Japan

2017 Men's World Grand Champions Cup
Tournament details
- Host country: Japan
- Dates: 12–17 September
- Teams: 6 (from 4 confederations)
- Venue: 2 (in 2 host cities)

Final positions
- Champions: Brazil (5th title)
- Runners-up: Italy
- Third place: Iran
- Fourth place: United States

Tournament awards
- MVP: (Brazil) Ricardo Lucarelli
- Best Setter: (Italy) Simone Giannelli
- Best OH: (Brazil) Ricardo Lucarelli (Iran) Milad Ebadipour
- Best MB: (Italy) Matteo Piano (Brazil) Lucas Saatkamp
- Best OPP: (United States) Matt Anderson
- Best Libero: (Japan) Satoshi Ide

Tournament statistics
- Matches played: 15
- Attendance: 79,800 (5,320 per match)

The 2017 FIVB Volleyball Men's World Grand Champions Cup was the 7th staging of the FIVB Volleyball World Grand Champions Cup, a quadrennial international men's volleyball tournament organized by the Fédération Internationale de Volleyball (FIVB). The tournament was held in Nagoya and Osaka, Japan from 12 to 17 September 2017. 6 national teams from 5 confederations competed in the tournament.

Brazil claimed their fourth straight Grand Champions Cup title and fifth overall. Italy and Iran won the silver and the bronze medal respectively. This was Iran's first ever medal at a worldwide-level FIVB tournament. Ricardo Lucarelli from Brazil was elected the MVP.

== Qualification ==
FIVB announced the four best ranked continents in the 2016 Olympic Games were eligible to participate in the tournament. South America, Europe, North America, and Asia confederations were eligible to send representatives. The representatives were determined by their continental rankings at the Olympic tournament. The four teams will join the host team and a wild card team which to compete for the World Grand Champions Cup title.

2017 World Grand Champions Cup participating teams

=== Qualified teams ===
Country	Confederation	Qualified as	Previous appearances		
Country	Confederation	Qualified as	Total	First	Last
Japan	AVC	Host nation	6	1993	2013
Brazil	CSV	The first continental representative	6	1993	2013
France	CEV	The second continental representative	0	Debut	Debut
United States	NORCECA	The third continental representative	3	1993	2013
Iran	AVC	The fourth continental representative	2	2009	2013
Italy	CEV	Wild card	3	1993	2013

== Competition formula ==
The competition formula of the 2017 Men's World Grand Champions Cup was a single Round-Robin system. Each team plays against each of the five remaining teams. Points were accumulated during the whole tournament, and the final standing was determined by the total points gained.

== Venues ==
Nagoya round	Osaka round
Nagoya, Japan	Osaka, Japan
Nippon Gaishi Hall	Osaka Municipal Central Gymnasium
Capacity: 8,000	Capacity: 8,200

== Pool standing procedure ==
1. Number of matches won
2. Match points
3. Sets ratio
4. Points ratio
5. If the tie continues as per the point ratio between two teams, the priority will be given to the team which won the last match between them. When the tie in points ratio is between three or more teams, a new classification of these teams in the terms of points 1, 2 and 3 will be made taking into consideration only the matches in which they were opposed to each other.

Match won 3–0 or 3–1: 3 match points for the winner, 0 match points for the loser
Match won 3–2: 2 match points for the winner, 1 match point for the loser

== Results ==
- All times are Japan Standard Time (UTC+09:00).

Pos	Team	Pld	W	L	Pts	SW	SL	SR	SPW	SPL	SPR
1	Brazil	5	4	1	12	14	5	2.800	446	393	1.135
2	Italy	5	4	1	12	14	8	1.750	509	506	1.006
3	Iran	5	4	1	9	12	10	1.200	501	495	1.012
4	United States	5	2	3	8	11	9	1.222	463	416	1.113
5	France	5	1	4	4	6	12	0.500	410	436	0.940
6	Japan	5	0	5	0	2	15	0.133	335	418	0.801

=== Nagoya round ===
Date	Time		Score		Set 1	Set 2	Set 3	Set 4	Set 5	Total	Report
12 Sep	12:40	France	0–3	Brazil	25–27	25–27	22–25			72–79	P2 P3
12 Sep	15:40	Italy	2–3	Iran	19–25	25–23	26–28	31–29	11–15	112–120	P2 P3
12 Sep	19:15	Japan	0–3	United States	21–25	18–25	13–25			52–75	P2 P3
13 Sep	12:40	Brazil	2–3	Italy	25–15	25–27	25–27	25–18	12–15	112–102	P2 P3
13 Sep	15:40	United States	2–3	Iran	25–20	25–17	25–27	21–25	12–15	108–104	P2 P3
13 Sep	19:15	Japan	0–3	France	15–25	23–25	23–25			61–75	P2 P3

=== Osaka round ===
Date	Time		Score		Set 1	Set 2	Set 3	Set 4	Set 5	Total	Report
15 Sep	12:40	Iran	0–3	Brazil	22–25	19–25	15–25			56–75	P2 P3
15 Sep	15:40	France	0–3	United States	20–25	17–25	16–25			53–75	P2 P3
15 Sep	19:15	Italy	3–1	Japan	25–23	22–25	25–20	25–22		97–90	P2 P3
16 Sep	12:40	United States	2–3	Brazil	26–28	25–15	20–25	25–22	13–15	109–105	P2 P3
16 Sep	15:50	France	1–3	Italy	25–21	20–25	22–25	21–25		88–96	P2 P3
16 Sep	19:15	Japan	1–3	Iran	25–21	19–25	20–25	14–25		78–96	P2 P3
17 Sep	11:40	Italy	3–1	United States	25–22	25–22	23–25	29–27		102–96	P2 P3
17 Sep	14:40	Iran	3–2	France	38–36	25–23	22–25	25–27	15–11	125–122	P2 P3
17 Sep	18:15	Brazil	3–0	Japan	25–17	25–15	25–22			75–54	P2 P3

== Final standing ==
Rank	Team
1st place, gold medalist(s)	Brazil
2nd place, silver medalist(s)	Italy
3rd place, bronze medalist(s)	Iran
4	United States
5	France
6	Japan

2017 Men's World Grand Champions Cup champions

Brazil
5th title

14–man roster
Bruno (c), Isac, Tiago Brendle, Wallace, Raphael, Otávio, Rodriguinho, Maurício Souza, Douglas, Lucão, Thales, Lucarelli, Maurício Borges, Renan
Head coach
Renan Dal Zotto

== Awards ==
- Most Valuable Player
  (Brazil) Ricardo Lucarelli
- Best setter
  (Italy) Simone Giannelli
- Best outside spikers
  (Brazil) Ricardo Lucarelli
  (Iran) Milad Ebadipour
- Best middle blockers
  (Italy) Matteo Piano
  (Brazil) Lucas Saatkamp
- Best opposite spiker
  (United States) Matt Anderson
- Best libero
  (Japan) Satoshi Ide

== See also ==
- 2017 FIVB Volleyball Women's World Grand Champions Cup
