= Renan Buiatti =

Brazilian volleyball player (born 1990)

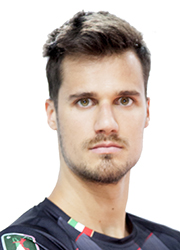

Personal information
- Full name: Renan Zanatta Buiatti
- Nationality: (Brazil) Brazilian
- Born: 10 January 1990 (age 36); Uberlândia, MG, Brazil
- Height: 2.17 m (7 ft 1 in)
- Weight: 110 kg (243 lb)
- Spike: 360 cm (142 in)
- Block: 345 cm (136 in)

Volleyball information
- Position: Opposite
- Current club: (France) Tourcoing Lille Métropole Volley-Ball
- Number: 1

Career
Years	Teams
2009–2010; 2010–2013; 2013–2014; 2014–2015; 2015–2016; 2016; 2016–2017; 2017–2018; 2018–2019; 2019; 2019–2020; 2020–2022; 2022-	(Brazil) EC Banespa (Brazil) São Bernardo Vôlei (Brazil) SESI São Paulo (Italy) Porto Robur Costa (Italy) Volley Milano (Brazil) Sada Cruzeiro (Brazil) JF Vôlei (Brazil) SESC–RJ (Italy) BCC Castellana Grotte (Turkey) Sorgun Belediyespor (Brazil) Vôlei Renata (Brazil) Farma Conde Vôlei São José (France) Tourcoing Lille Métropole Volley-Ball

National team
2013–	Brazil
Honours
Men's volleyball
Representing Brazil
FIVB World Championship
Silver medal – second place	2014 Poland
FIVB World Grand Champions Cup
Gold medal – first place	2017 Japan
FIVB World League
Silver medal – second place	2017 Curitiba
Pan American Games
Silver medal – second place	2015 Toronto
Pan American Cup
Gold medal – first place	2013 Mexico City
CSV South American Championship
Gold medal – first place	2013 Cabo Frio
Gold medal – first place	2015 Maceió
Gold medal – first place	2017 Chile

Renan Zanatta Buiatti (born 10 January 1990) is a Brazilian professional volleyball player. He was part of the Brazil men's national volleyball team that finished in second place at the 2014 World Championship in Poland.

== Sporting achievements ==
=== Clubs ===
- FIVB Club World Championship
  - Betim 2016 – with Sada Cruzeiro
- National championships
  - 2013/2014 Brazilian Championship, with SESI São Paulo

=== Youth national team ===
- 2009 FIVB U21 World Championship

=== Individual awards ===
- 2009: FIVB U21 World Championship – Best Blocker
- 2013: Pan American Games – Best Opposite
- 2013: Pan American Cup – Best Opposite
