= Maurício Borges Silva =

Brazilian volleyball player (born 1989)

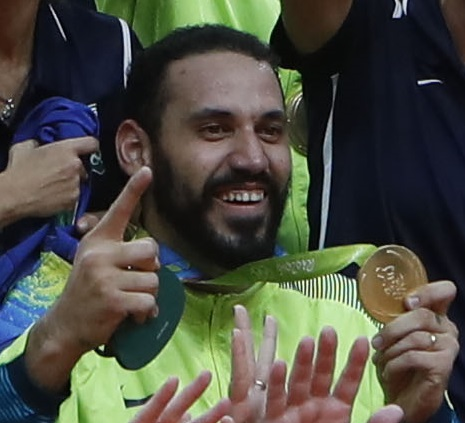
- Maurício Borges Silva in 2016

Personal information
- Full name: Maurício Borges Almeida Silva
- Born: 4 February 1989 (age 37); Maceió, Brazil
- Height: 1.99 m (6 ft 6 in)

Volleyball information
- Position: Outside hitter
- Current club: Asseco Resovia
- Number: 6

Career
Years	Teams
2005–2010; 2010–2011; 2011–2013; 2013–2014; 2014; 2014–2015; 2015–2017; 2017–2020; 2020–2021; 2021–2022; 2022–2023; 2023; 2023–	Minas Tênis Clube; EC Pinheiros; Sada Cruzeiro; Minas Tênis Clube; Fakel Novy Urengoy; SESI São Paulo; Arkas İzmir; SESC RJ; Vôlei Taubaté; Volley Callipo; Czarni Radom; Asseco Resovia; Vôlei Renata

National team
2010–2021	Brazil
Honours
Men's volleyball
Representing Brazil
Olympic Games
Gold medal – first place	2016 Rio de Janeiro
FIVB World Championship
Silver medal – second place	2014 Poland
FIVB World Cup
Gold medal – first place	2019 Japan
FIVB World Grand Champions Cup
Gold medal – first place	2013 Japan
Gold medal – first place	2017 Japan
FIVB Nations League
Gold medal – first place	2021 Rimini
FIVB World League
Gold medal – first place	2010 Córdoba
Silver medal – second place	2013 Mar del Plata
Silver medal – second place	2014 Florence
Silver medal – second place	2016 Kraków
Silver medal – second place	2017 Curitiba
Pan American Games
Gold medal – first place	2011 Guadalajara
Silver medal – second place	2015 Toronto
Pan American Cup
Gold medal – first place	2013 Mexico City
CSV South American Championship
Gold medal – first place	2013 Cabo Frio
Gold medal – first place	2017 Santiago/Temuco

Maurício Borges Almeida Silva (born 4 February 1989) is a Brazilian professional volleyball player who plays as an outside hitter for Vôlei Renata. He is a former member of the Brazil national team, the 2016 Olympic Champion, a silver medallist at the 2014 World Championship, and the 2019 World Cup winner. He also competed for Brazil at the 2020 Summer Olympics.

== Honours ==
=== Club ===
- FIVB Club World Championship
  - Doha 2012 – with Sada Cruzeiro
- CSV South American Club Championship
  - Linares 2012 – with Sada Cruzeiro
- Domestic
  - 2006–07 Brazilian Championship, with Minas Tênis Clube
  - 2011–12 Brazilian Championship, with Sada Cruzeiro
  - 2020–21 Brazilian SuperCup, with Vôlei Taubaté

=== Youth national team ===
- 2006 CSV U19 South American Championship
- 2008 CSV U21 South American Championship
- 2009 FIVB U21 World Championship

=== Individual awards ===
- 2009: FIVB U21 World Championship – Most valuable player
- 2017: CSV South American Championship – Most valuable player
