= 2013 Men's Pan-American Volleyball Cup =

Tournament details
- Host country: Mexico
- Dates: 19–24 August
- Teams: 7
- Venue: 1 (in 1 host city)

Final positions
- Champions: Brazil (2nd title)

Tournament awards
- MVP: (Brazil) Ricardo Lucarelli

The 2013 Men's Pan-American Volleyball Cup was the eighth edition of the annual men's volleyball tournament, played by seven countries. It was held in Mexico City, Mexico from 19 to 24 August 2013.

== Pools composition ==
Pool A	Pool B
Brazil	United States
Argentina	Mexico
Puerto Rico	Dominican Republic
	Trinidad and Tobago

== Venue ==
- Gimnasio Olímpico Juan de la Barrera, Mexico City, Mexico

== Pool standing procedure ==
1. Numbers of matches won
2. Match points
3. Points ratio
4. Sets ratio
5. Result of the last match between the tied teams

Match won 3–0: 5 match points for the winner, 0 match points for the loser
Match won 3–1: 4 match points for the winner, 1 match point for the loser
Match won 3–2: 3 match points for the winner, 2 match points for the loser

== Preliminary round ==
- All times are Central Daylight Time (UTC−05:00).

=== Pool A ===
Pos	Team	Pld	W	L	Pts	SPW	SPL	SPR	SW	SL	SR	Qualification
1	Brazil	2	2	0	10	151	116	1.302	6	0	MAX	Semifinals
2	Argentina	2	1	1	4	155	162	0.957	3	4	0.750	Quarterfinals
3	Puerto Rico	2	0	2	1	141	169	0.834	1	6	0.167	Quarterfinals

Date	Time		Score		Set 1	Set 2	Set 3	Set 4	Set 5	Total	Report
19 Aug	15:04	Brazil	3–0	Puerto Rico	25–13	26–24	25–17			76–54	P2 P3
20 Aug	16:00	Argentina	3–1	Puerto Rico	18–25	25–22	25–22	25–18		93–87	P2 P3
21 Aug	16:00	Brazil	3–0	Argentina	25–22	25–19	25–21			75–62	P2 P3

=== Pool B ===
Pos	Team	Pld	W	L	Pts	SPW	SPL	SPR	SW	SL	SR	Qualification
1	Mexico	3	3	0	12	276	256	1.078	9	3	3.000	Semifinals
2	United States	3	2	1	10	294	246	1.195	8	5	1.600	Quarterfinals
3	Dominican Republic	3	1	2	8	262	250	1.048	6	6	1.000	Quarterfinals
4	Trinidad and Tobago	3	0	3	0	145	225	0.644	0	9	0.000	6th place match

Date	Time		Score		Set 1	Set 2	Set 3	Set 4	Set 5	Total	Report
19 Aug	17:00	United States	3–2	Dominican Republic	26–24	25–14	22–25	21–25	15–7	109–95	P2 P3
19 Aug	20:43	Mexico	3–0	Trinidad and Tobago	25–19	25–16	25–19			75–54	P2 P3
20 Aug	18:24	United States	3–0	Trinidad and Tobago	25–14	25–10	25–20			75–44	P2 P3
20 Aug	20:07	Mexico	3–1	Dominican Republic	18–25	25–20	26–24	25–23		94–92	P2 P3
21 Aug	18:03	Dominican Republic	3–0	Trinidad and Tobago	25–18	25–13	25–16			75–47	P2 P3
21 Aug	20:00	Mexico	3–2	United States	21–25	25–23	19–25	25–22	17–15	107–110	P2 P3

== Final round ==
- All times are Central Daylight Time (UTC−05:00).

Quarterfinals
22 August
Argentina	3
Dominican Republic	0
22 August
United States	2
Puerto Rico	3

Semifinals
23 August
Mexico	3
Argentina	1
23 August
Brazil	3
Puerto Rico	0

Final
24 August
Mexico	0
Brazil	3
3rd place
24 August
Argentina	3
Puerto Rico	2

=== Quarterfinals ===
Date	Time		Score		Set 1	Set 2	Set 3	Set 4	Set 5	Total	Report
22 Aug	18:00	Argentina	3–0	Dominican Republic	25–17	25–19	25–22			75–58	P2 P3
22 Aug	20:00	United States	2–3	Puerto Rico	25–16	16–25	28–26	25–27	16–18	110–112	P2 P3

=== Semifinals ===
Date	Time		Score		Set 1	Set 2	Set 3	Set 4	Set 5	Total	Report
23 Aug	18:10	Brazil	3–0	Puerto Rico	25–13	25–19	29–27			79–59	P2 P3
23 Aug	20:10	Mexico	3–1	Argentina	25–21	27–25	12–25	25–21		89–92	P2 P3

=== 5th place match ===
Date	Time		Score		Set 1	Set 2	Set 3	Set 4	Set 5	Total	Report
23 Aug	16:15	Dominican Republic	0–3	United States	20–25	19–25	14–25			53–75	P2 P3

=== 6th place match ===
Date	Time		Score		Set 1	Set 2	Set 3	Set 4	Set 5	Total	Report
24 Aug	13:00	Trinidad and Tobago	0–3	Dominican Republic	17–25	19–25	14–25			50–75	P2 P3

=== 3rd place match ===
Date	Time		Score		Set 1	Set 2	Set 3	Set 4	Set 5	Total	Report
24 Aug	15:00	Argentina	3–2	Puerto Rico	25–18	22–25	25–18	20–25	15–12	107–98	P2 P3

=== Final ===
Date	Time		Score		Set 1	Set 2	Set 3	Set 4	Set 5	Total	Report
24 Aug	17:46	Mexico	0–3	Brazil	21–25	20–25	17–25			58–75	P2 P3

== Final standing ==
Rank	Team
1st place, gold medalist(s)	Brazil
2nd place, silver medalist(s)	Mexico
3rd place, bronze medalist(s)	Argentina
4	Puerto Rico
5	United States
6	Dominican Republic
7	Trinidad and Tobago

2013 Men's Pan-American Cup
champions

Brazil
Second title

12–man roster
Alan, Otávio, Maurício, Lucarelli, Quaresma, Isac, Renan, Murilo, Luan, Lucas Lóh, Ricardo, M. Souza
Head coach
Rubinho

== Awards ==
=== Best players ===
- Most valuable player
  (Brazil) Ricardo Lucarelli
- Best scorer
  (Dominican Republic) Elvis Contreras
- Best spiker
  (Dominican Republic) Elvis Contreras
- Best blocker
  (Brazil) Maurício Souza
- Best server
  (United States) Taylor Sander
- Best digger
  (Argentina) Tomás Ruiz
- Best setter
  (Argentina) Juan Finoli
- Best receiver
  (Mexico) Reynold Rangel
- Best libero
  (Puerto Rico) Gregory Berrios

=== All–star team ===
- Best setter
  (Argentina) Juan Finoli
- Best outside spikers
  (Dominican Republic) Elvis Contreras
  (United States) Taylor Sander
- Best middle blockers
  (Brazil) Maurício Souza
  (Brazil) Isac Santos
- Best opposite spiker
  (Brazil) Renan Buiatti
- Best libero
  (Puerto Rico) Gregory Berrios
