= Lucas Lóh =

Brazilian volleyball player (born 1991)

Personal information
- Full name: Lucas Eduardo Lóh
- Born: 18 January 1991 (age 35); Toledo, Brazil
- Height: 1.95 m (6 ft 5 in)
- Weight: 83 kg (183 lb)
- Spike: 336 cm (132 in)

Volleyball information
- Position: Outside hitter

Career
Years	Teams
2010–2012; 2012–2014; 2014–2015; 2015–2016; 2016–2017; 2017–2018; 2018–2020; 2020–2021; 2021	Sada Cruzeiro; Minas Tênis Clube; ZAKSA Kędzierzyn-Koźle; Brasil Vôlei Clube; Vôlei Taubaté; Halkbank Ankara; SESI São Paulo; Czarni Radom; Tours VB

National team
2013–2019	Brazil
Honours
Men's volleyball
Representing Brazil
FIVB World Championship
Silver medal – second place	2018 Italy/Bulgaria
FIVB World Grand Champions Cup
Gold medal – first place	2013 Japan
FIVB World League
Silver medal – second place	2014 Florence
Silver medal – second place	2017 Curitiba
Pan American Games
Bronze medal – third place	2019 Lima
Pan American Cup
Gold medal – first place	2013 Mexico City
CSV South American Championship
Gold medal – first place	2015 Maceió

Lucas Eduardo Lóh (born 18 January 1991) is a Brazilian professional volleyball player, a former member of the Brazil national team, and a silver medallist at the 2014 World League.

== Career ==
=== Clubs ===
In 2011 won a silver medal of Brazilian Championship with Sada Cruzeiro Vôlei. A year later, the team has improved this result. Sada Cruzeiro Vôlei with Lóh in the team was a Brazil Champion in the season 2011/2012. In 2012-2014 played in Vivo/Minas. On June 18, 2014, moved to Polish club - ZAKSA Kędzierzyn-Koźle and signed one-year contract. In April 2014 left Polish club.

=== National team ===
In 2013 won gold medal of the World U-23 Championship.

== Honours ==
=== Clubs ===
- CSV South American Club Championship
  - Belo Horizonte 2013 – with Minas Tênis Clube
- FIVB Club World Championship
  - Betim 2021 – with Sada Cruzeiro
  - India 2023 – with Itambé Minas
- National championships
  - 2011/2012 Brazilian Championship, with Sada Cruzeiro
  - 2016/2017 Brazilian Cup, with Vôlei Taubaté
  - 2017/2018 Turkish Cup, with Halkbank Ankara
  - 2017/2018 Turkish Championship, with Halkbank Ankara
  - 2018/2019 Brazilian SuperCup, with SESI São Paulo

=== Youth national team ===
- 2013 FIVB U23 World Championship
