= Isac Santos =

Brazilian volleyball player (born 1990)

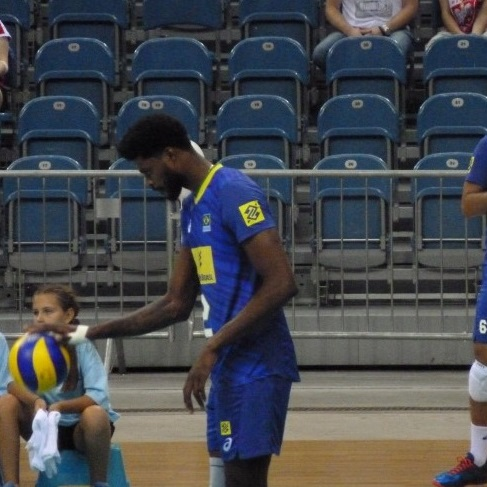
- Santos in 2019

Personal information
- Full name: Isac Viana Santos
- Born: 13 December 1990 (age 35); São Gonçalo, Rio de Janeiro, Brazil
- Height: 2.08 m (6 ft 10 in)
- Weight: 99 kg (218 lb)

Volleyball information
- Position: Middle blocker
- Current club: Itambé Minas
- Number: 12

Career
Years	Teams
2009–2010; 2010–2013; 2013–2022; 2023; 2023–	Brasil Vôlei Clube; São Bernardo; Sada Cruzeiro; Jakarta STIN BIN; Itambé Minas

National team
2013–	Brazil
Honours
Men's volleyball
Representing Brazil
FIVB World Championship
Silver medal – second place	2018 Italy/Bulgaria
FIVB World Cup
Gold medal – first place	2019 Japan
FIVB World Grand Champions Cup
Gold medal – first place	2017 Japan
FIVB Nations League
Gold medal – first place	2021 Rimini
FIVB World League
Silver medal – second place	2013 Mar del Plata
Silver medal – second place	2016 Kraków
Pan American Cup
Gold medal – first place	2013 Mexico City
CSV South American Championship
Gold medal – first place	2015 Maceió
Gold medal – first place	2017 Santiago/Temuco
Gold medal – first place	2019 Chile
Gold medal – first place	2021 Brasília

Isac Viana Santos (born 13 December 1990) is a Brazilian professional volleyball player. He is a member of the Brazil national team, a silver medallist at the 2018 World Championship and the 2019 World Cup winner. At the professional club level, he plays for the Indonesian team, Jakarta STIN BIN.

== Honours ==
=== Club ===
- FIVB Club World Championship
  - Betim 2013 – with Sada Cruzeiro
  - Betim 2015 – with Sada Cruzeiro
  - Betim 2016 – with Sada Cruzeiro
  - Betim 2019 – with Sada Cruzeiro
  - Betim 2021 – with Sada Cruzeiro
  - India 2023 – with Itambé Minas
- CSV South American Club Championship
  - Belo Horizonte 2014 – with Sada Cruzeiro
  - Taubate 2016 – with Sada Cruzeiro
  - Montes Claros 2017 – with Sada Cruzeiro
  - Montes Claros 2018 – with Sada Cruzeiro
  - Belo Horizonte 2019 – with Sada Cruzeiro
  - Contagem 2020 – with Sada Cruzeiro
  - Contagem 2022 – with Sada Cruzeiro
- National championships
  - 2013–14 Brazilian Cup, with Sada Cruzeiro
  - 2013–14 Brazilian Championship, with Sada Cruzeiro
  - 2014–15 Brazilian Championship, with Sada Cruzeiro
  - 2015–16 Brazilian SuperCup, with Sada Cruzeiro
  - 2015–16 Brazilian Cup, with Sada Cruzeiro
  - 2015–16 Brazilian Championship, with Sada Cruzeiro
  - 2016–17 Brazilian SuperCup, with Sada Cruzeiro
  - 2016–17 Brazilian Championship, with Sada Cruzeiro
  - 2017–18 Brazilian SuperCup, with Sada Cruzeiro
  - 2017–18 Brazilian Cup, with Sada Cruzeiro
  - 2017–18 Brazilian Championship, with Sada Cruzeiro
  - 2018–19 Brazilian Cup, with Sada Cruzeiro
  - 2019–20 Brazilian Cup, with Sada Cruzeiro
  - 2020–21 Brazilian Cup, with Sada Cruzeiro
  - 2021–22 Brazilian SuperCup, with Sada Cruzeiro
  - 2021–22 Brazilian Championship, with Sada Cruzeiro

=== Youth national team ===
- 2008 CSV U21 South American Championship
- 2009 FIVB U21 World Championship

=== Individual awards ===
- 2013: Pan American Cup – Best Middle Blocker
- 2014: CSV South American Club Championship – Best Middle Blocker
- 2015: CSV South American Championship – Best Middle Blocker
- 2016: CSV South American Club Championship – Best Middle Blocker
- 2018: CSV South American Club Championship – Best Middle Blocker
- 2019: CSV South American Club Championship – Best Middle Blocker
