= 2009 FIVB Volleyball Men's U21 World Championship =

Volleyball competition held in India

2009 Men's Junior World Championship
Tournament details
- Host country: India
- Dates: 31 July – 9 August
- Teams: 16
- Venues: 2 (in 1 host city)

Final positions
- Champions: Brazil (4th title)

Tournament awards
- MVP: (Brazil) Maurício Borges Silva

The 2009 FIVB Volleyball Men's Junior World Championship was held in Pune, India from 31 July to 9 August 2009. Brazil won the tournament after defeating Cuba 3–2 in the final. Maurício Borges Silva was elected the Most Valuable Player.

== Pools composition ==
Pool A	Pool B	Pool C	Pool D
Tunisia; United States; Belarus; India	Iran; China; Egypt; Belgium	Greece; Cuba; Argentina; France	Russia; Poland; Canada; Brazil

== Venues ==
- Balewadi Sports Complex – Badminton Hall, Pune, India – Pool A, C, E, F, 1st–4th places and 5th–8th places
- Balewadi Sports Complex – Boxing Hall, Pune, India – Pool B, D, G, H, 9th–12th places and 13th–16th places

== First round ==
- All times are Indian Standard Time (UTC+05:30).

=== Pool A ===
Pos	Team	Pld	W	L	Pts	SW	SL	SR	SPW	SPL	SPR	Qualification
1	India	3	2	1	5	8	3	2.667	255	208	1.226	Pool E or Pool F
2	United States	3	2	1	5	6	5	1.200	266	256	1.039	Pool E or Pool F
3	Belarus	3	2	1	5	7	6	1.167	308	297	1.037	Pool G or Pool H
4	Tunisia	3	0	3	3	2	9	0.222	203	271	0.749	Pool G or Pool H

Date	Time		Score		Set 1	Set 2	Set 3	Set 4	Set 5	Total	Report
Jul 31	10:00	United States	3–1	Belarus	32–30	21–25	25–18	30–28		108–101	P2 P3
Jul 31	16:35	Tunisia	0–3	India	11–25	15–25	13–25			39–75	P2 P3
Aug 01	14:40	Tunisia	1–3	United States	25–21	19–25	15–25	21–25		80–96	P2 P3
Aug 01	18:45	India	2–3	Belarus	21–25	25–22	23–25	25–20	11–15	105–107	P2 P3
Aug 02	14:35	Belarus	3–1	Tunisia	24–26	26–24	25–17	25–17		100–84	P2 P3
Aug 02	19:15	India	3–0	United States	25–23	25–21	25–18			75–62	P2 P3

=== Pool B ===
Pos	Team	Pld	W	L	Pts	SW	SL	SR	SPW	SPL	SPR	Qualification
1	Iran	3	3	0	6	9	2	4.500	268	205	1.307	Pool E or Pool F
2	Belgium	3	2	1	5	6	3	2.000	219	201	1.090	Pool E or Pool F
3	China	3	1	2	4	4	6	0.667	204	225	0.907	Pool G or Pool H
4	Egypt	3	0	3	3	1	9	0.111	191	251	0.761	Pool G or Pool H

Date	Time		Score		Set 1	Set 2	Set 3	Set 4	Set 5	Total	Report
Jul 31	10:00	Iran	3–0	Belgium	25–20	27–25	25–17			77–62	P2 P3
Jul 31	14:50	China	3–0	Egypt	25–16	25–20	25–17			75–53	P2 P3
Aug 01	12:00	Belgium	3–0	Egypt	25–12	32–30	25–21			82–63	P2 P3
Aug 01	18:54	Iran	3–1	China	25–15	22–25	25–15	25–13		97–68	P2 P3
Aug 02	12:00	China	0–3	Belgium	17–25	22–25	22–25			61–75	P2 P3
Aug 02	14:00	Egypt	1–3	Iran	9–25	25–19	21–25	20–25		75–94	P2 P3

=== Pool C ===
Pos	Team	Pld	W	L	Pts	SW	SL	SR	SPW	SPL	SPR	Qualification
1	Argentina	3	2	1	5	8	4	2.000	283	249	1.137	Pool E or Pool F
2	Cuba	3	2	1	5	6	5	1.200	250	235	1.064	Pool E or Pool F
3	France	3	2	1	5	8	5	1.600	281	279	1.007	Pool G or Pool H
4	Greece	3	0	3	3	1	9	0.111	195	246	0.793	Pool G or Pool H

Date	Time		Score		Set 1	Set 2	Set 3	Set 4	Set 5	Total	Report
Jul 31	12:35	Cuba	0–3	Argentina	20–25	29–31	16–25			65–81	P2 P3
Jul 31	14:35	Greece	0–3	France	18–25	20–25	24–26			62–76	P2 P3
Aug 01	12:00	France	3–2	Argentina	19–25	25–23	20–25	25–23	15–11	104–107	P2 P3
Aug 01	16:50	Greece	0–3	Cuba	17–25	20–25	16–25			53–75	P2 P3
Aug 02	12:00	Cuba	3–2	France	23–25	25–22	25–16	22–25	15–13	110–101	P2 P3
Aug 02	16:55	Argentina	3–1	Greece	20–25	25–22	25–16	25–17		95–80	P2 P3

=== Pool D ===
Pos	Team	Pld	W	L	Pts	SW	SL	SR	SPW	SPL	SPR	Qualification
1	Brazil	3	3	0	6	9	1	9.000	253	203	1.246	Pool E or Pool F
2	Russia	3	2	1	5	7	6	1.167	296	308	0.961	Pool E or Pool F
3	Canada	3	1	2	4	4	8	0.500	248	276	0.899	Pool G or Pool H
4	Poland	3	0	3	3	4	9	0.444	273	283	0.965	Pool G or Pool H

Date	Time		Score		Set 1	Set 2	Set 3	Set 4	Set 5	Total	Report
Jul 31	12:10	Poland	2–3	Canada	25–19	21–25	25–15	20–25	11–15	102–99	P2 P3
Jul 31	16:40	Russia	1–3	Brazil	28–30	16–25	25–23	19–25		88–103	P2 P3
Aug 01	14:00	Brazil	3–0	Canada	25–21	25–22	25–13			75–56	P2 P3
Aug 01	16:00	Russia	3–2	Poland	32–30	21–25	16–25	25–22	15–10	109–112	P2 P3
Aug 02	16:15	Canada	1–3	Russia	30–32	16–25	25–17	22–25		93–99	P2 P3
Aug 02	19:12	Poland	0–3	Brazil	18–25	23–25	18–25			59–75	P2 P3

== Second round ==
=== Pool E (1st–8th) ===
Pos	Team	Pld	W	L	Pts	SW	SL	SR	SPW	SPL	SPR	Qualification
1	Argentina	3	2	1	5	8	3	2.667	256	223	1.148	Semifinals
2	India	3	2	1	5	6	7	0.857	278	288	0.965	Semifinals
3	Russia	3	1	2	4	5	6	0.833	252	247	1.020	5th–8th place
4	Belgium	3	1	2	4	5	8	0.625	258	286	0.902	5th–8th place

Date	Time		Score		Set 1	Set 2	Set 3	Set 4	Set 5	Total	Report
04 Aug	12:00	Belgium	3–2	Argentina	22–25	25–21	28–26	21–25	15–9	111–106	P2 P3
04 Aug	19:00	India	3–2	Russia	25–22	26–28	33–31	22–25	15–11	121–117	P2 P3
05 Aug	14:00	Belgium	0–3	Russia	21–25	13–25	17–25			51–75	P2 P3
05 Aug	18:00	India	0–3	Argentina	14–25	21–25	17–25			52–75	P2 P3
06 Aug	14:40	Argentina	3–0	Russia	25–19	25–23	25–18			75–60	P2 P3
06 Aug	18:25	India	3–2	Belgium	18–25	25–19	25–16	22–25	15–11	105–96	P2 P3

=== Pool F (1st–8th) ===
Pos	Team	Pld	W	L	Pts	SW	SL	SR	SPW	SPL	SPR	Qualification
1	Brazil	3	3	0	6	9	1	9.000	247	204	1.211	Semifinals
2	Cuba	3	2	1	5	6	3	2.000	208	207	1.005	Semifinals
3	Iran	3	1	2	4	3	8	0.375	231	249	0.928	5th–8th place
4	United States	3	0	3	3	3	9	0.333	254	280	0.907	5th–8th place

Date	Time		Score		Set 1	Set 2	Set 3	Set 4	Set 5	Total	Report
04 Aug	14:50	United States	1–3	Brazil	21–25	23–25	25–22	17–25		86–97	P2 P3
04 Aug	17:06	Iran	0–3	Cuba	18–25	23–25	22–25			63–75	P2 P3
05 Aug	12:00	United States	0–3	Cuba	23–25	23–25	23–25			69–75	P2 P3
05 Aug	16:00	Iran	0–3	Brazil	20–25	22–25	18–25			60–75	P2 P3
06 Aug	12:00	Iran	3–2	United States	23–25	25–21	25–18	20–25	15–10	108–99	P2 P3
06 Aug	16:40	Brazil	3–0	Cuba	25–22	25–14	25–22			75–58	P2 P3

=== Pool G (9th–16th) ===
Pos	Team	Pld	W	L	Pts	SW	SL	SR	SPW	SPL	SPR	Qualification
1	Poland	3	3	0	6	9	3	3.000	275	257	1.070	9th–12th place
2	France	3	2	1	5	8	4	2.000	274	249	1.100	9th–12th place
3	Belarus	3	1	2	4	3	7	0.429	214	235	0.911	13th–16th place
4	Egypt	3	0	3	3	3	9	0.333	260	282	0.922	13th–16th place

Date	Time		Score		Set 1	Set 2	Set 3	Set 4	Set 5	Total	Report
04 Aug	12:00	Egypt	1–3	France	23–25	19–25	25–18	19–25		86–93	P2 P3
04 Aug	14:20	Belarus	0–3	Poland	19–25	23–25	20–25			62–75	P2 P3
05 Aug	12:00	Belarus	0–3	France	20–25	18–25	23–25			61–75	P2 P3
05 Aug	16:35	Egypt	1–3	Poland	22–25	21–25	25–23	21–25		89–98	P2 P3
06 Aug	16:45	France	2–3	Poland	24–26	25–20	25–16	20–25	12–15	106–102	P2 P3
06 Aug	12:00	Belarus	3–1	Egypt	15–25	25–19	26–24	25–17		91–85	P2 P3

=== Pool H (9th–16th) ===
Pos	Team	Pld	W	L	Pts	SW	SL	SR	SPW	SPL	SPR	Qualification
1	China	3	3	0	6	9	4	2.250	295	251	1.175	9th–12th place
2	Canada	3	2	1	5	8	5	1.600	286	283	1.011	9th–12th place
3	Greece	3	1	2	4	6	8	0.750	290	313	0.927	13th–16th place
4	Tunisia	3	0	3	3	3	9	0.333	248	272	0.912	13th–16th place

Date	Time		Score		Set 1	Set 2	Set 3	Set 4	Set 5	Total	Report
04 Aug	16:18	Tunisia	1–3	Canada	25–20	20–25	18–25	23–25		86–95	P2 P3
04 Aug	18:40	China	3–2	Greece	25–23	23–25	24–26	25–12	15–13	112–99	P2 P3
05 Aug	19:00	China	3–2	Canada	25–18	20–25	23–25	25–17	15–12	108–97	P2 P3
05 Aug	14:00	Tunisia	2–3	Greece	25–15	23–25	21–25	25–22	13–15	107–102	P2 P3
06 Aug	14:20	Canada	3–1	Greece	26–24	18–25	25–22	25–18		94–89	P2 P3
06 Aug	19:25	China	3–0	Tunisia	25–15	25–18	25–22			75–55	P2 P3

== Final round ==
=== 13th–16th places bracket ===
13th–16th places
August 8 – Pune
Greece	2
Egypt	3
August 8 – Pune
Belarus	1
Tunisia	3

13th place
August 9 – Pune
Egypt	3
Tunisia	2
15th place
August 9 – Pune
Greece	0
Belarus	3

Date	Time		Score		Set 1	Set 2	Set 3	Set 4	Set 5	Total	Report
08 Aug	12:00	Greece	2–3	Egypt	23–25	25–21	22–25	25–23	11–15	106–109	P2 P3
08 Aug	14:45	Belarus	1–3	Tunisia	25–17	19–25	24–26	22–25		90–93	P2 P3

Date	Time		Score		Set 1	Set 2	Set 3	Set 4	Set 5	Total	Report
09 Aug	10:00	Greece	0–3	Belarus	23–25	16–25	22–25			61–75	P2 P3

Date	Time		Score		Set 1	Set 2	Set 3	Set 4	Set 5	Total	Report
09 Aug	12:00	Egypt	3–2	Tunisia	25–16	20–25	23–25	25–20	15–13	108–99	P2 P3

=== 9th–12th places bracket ===
9th–12th places
August 8 – Pune
China	0
France	3
August 8 – Pune
Poland	3
Canada	0

9th place
August 9 – Pune
France	0
Poland	3
11th place
August 9 – Pune
China	3
Canada	2

Date	Time		Score		Set 1	Set 2	Set 3	Set 4	Set 5	Total	Report
08 Aug	17:10	China	0–3	France	16–25	21–25	22–25			59–75	P2 P3
08 Aug	18:55	Poland	3–0	Canada	25–18	25–18	25–21			75–57	P2 P3

Date	Time		Score		Set 1	Set 2	Set 3	Set 4	Set 5	Total	Report
09 Aug	14:40	China	3–2	Canada	21–25	18–25	26–24	25–22	15–8	105–104	P2 P3

Date	Time		Score		Set 1	Set 2	Set 3	Set 4	Set 5	Total	Report
09 Aug	17:05	France	0–3	Poland	14–25	23–25	17–25			54–75	P2 P3

=== 5th–8th places bracket ===
5th–8th places
August 8 – Pune
Iran	0
Belgium	3
August 8 – Pune
Russia	3
United States	0

5th place
August 9 – Pune
Belgium	1
Russia	3
7th place
August 9 – Pune
Iran	3
United States	1

Date	Time		Score		Set 1	Set 2	Set 3	Set 4	Set 5	Total	Report
08 Aug	12:00	Iran	0–3	Belgium	19–25	24–26	18–25			61–76	P2 P3
08 Aug	14:00	Russia	3–0	United States	25–19	25–18	25–18			75–55	P2 P3

Date	Time		Score		Set 1	Set 2	Set 3	Set 4	Set 5	Total	Report
09 Aug	12:00	Iran	3–1	United States	22–25	25–17	25–12	25–18		97–72	P2 P3

Date	Time		Score		Set 1	Set 2	Set 3	Set 4	Set 5	Total	Report
09 Aug	14:10	Belgium	1–3	Russia	25–23	18–25	18–25	15–25		76–98	P2 P3

=== Championship bracket ===
Semifinals
August 8 – Pune
Brazil	3
India	2
August 8 – Pune
Argentina	1
Cuba	3

Final
August 9 – Pune
Brazil	3
Cuba	2
3rd place
August 9 – Pune
India	0
Argentina	3

=== Semifinals ===
Date	Time		Score		Set 1	Set 2	Set 3	Set 4	Set 5	Total	Report
08 Aug	16:00	Argentina	1–3	Cuba	19–25	18–25	26–24	20–25		83–99	P2 P3
08 Aug	18:28	Brazil	3–2	India	25–19	17–25	25–19	23–25	15–9	105–97	P2 P3

=== 3rd place ===
Date	Time		Score		Set 1	Set 2	Set 3	Set 4	Set 5	Total	Report
09 Aug	16:25	India	0–3	Argentina	19–25	16–25	22–25			57–75	P2 P3

=== Final ===
Date	Time		Score		Set 1	Set 2	Set 3	Set 4	Set 5	Total	Report
09 Aug	18:20	Brazil	3–2	Cuba	30–28	21–25	25–22	23–25	15–8	114–108	P2 P3

== Final standing ==
Rank	Team
1st place, gold medalist(s)	Brazil
2nd place, silver medalist(s)	Cuba
3rd place, bronze medalist(s)	Argentina
4	India
5	Russia
6	Belgium
7	Iran
8	United States
9	Poland
10	France
11	China
12	Canada
13	Egypt
14	Tunisia
15	Belarus
16	Greece

2009 Men's U21 World champions

Brazil
4th title

12–man Roster
Aurélio Figueiredo, Tiago Wesz, Maurício Borges Silva, Murilo Radke (C), Guilherme Koepp, Najari Carvalho, Isac Santos, Ygor Francisco tavares Duarte, Renan Zanatta Buiatti, Jairo Wiest Medeiros, Thales Hoss, Franco Willian Cargnin Paese
Head coach
Percy Oncken

== Awards ==
- Most valuable player
  (Brazil) Maurício Borges Silva
- Best scorer
  (Russia) Levan Kalandadze
- Best spiker
  (Iran) Farhad Ghaemi
- Best blocker
  (Brazil) Renan Buiatti
- Best server
  (India) Raja Manidurai
- Best setter
  (Cuba) Leandro Macías
- Best libero
  (Argentina) Franco López
