= 2019 FIVB Volleyball Men's World Cup =

Volleyball tournament in Japan

2019 Men's World Cup
ワールドカップバレーボール 日本 2019

Tournament details
- Host country: Japan
- Dates: 1–15 October
- Teams: 12 (from 5 confederations)
- Venue: 4 (in 3 host cities)

Final positions
- Champions: Brazil (3rd title)
- Runners-up: Poland
- Third place: United States
- Fourth place: Japan

Tournament awards
- MVP: (Brazil) Alan Souza
- Best Setter: (United States) Micah Christenson
- Best OH: (Poland) Wilfredo León (Japan) Yūki Ishikawa
- Best MB: (United States) Maxwell Holt (Brazil) Lucas Saatkamp
- Best OPP: (Japan) Yūji Nishida
- Best Libero: (Brazil) Thales Hoss

Tournament statistics
- Matches played: 66
- Attendance: 152,460 (2,310 per match)
- Best scorer: (Italy) Gabriele Nelli
- Best spiker: (Argentina) Agustín Loser
- Best blocker: (Russia) Ivan Iakovlev
- Best server: (Japan) Yūji Nishida
- Best setter: (Argentina) Matías Sánchez
- Best digger: (Australia) Luke Perry
- Best receiver: (Argentina) Santiago Danani

The 2019 FIVB Men's World Cup was the 14th edition of the event, contested by the senior men's national teams of the members of the Fédération Internationale de Volleyball (FIVB), the sport's global governing body. The tournament was held from 1 to 15 October 2019 in Japan. That was the first time since 1989 that FIVB decided not to allocate any spots in the Olympics, due to Japan hosting the 2020 Summer Olympics.

== Qualification ==
Twelve teams qualified for the competition by being one of the top two teams of each continental federation based on FIVB World Ranking on 1 January 2019 (except Japan who qualified as hosts, and Poland who qualified as 2018 World Champions).

Qualified to 2019 FIVB World Cup
Host and 2018 World Champion

Rank	Team	WC 2015	OG 2016	WL 2017	WCH 2018	Total	Note
1	Brazil	80	100	45	90	315	CSV first team
2	United States	100	80	40	80	300	NORCECA first team
3	Italy	90	90	24	62	266	CEV first team
4	Poland	80	50	32	100	262	2018 World champion
5	Russia	70	70	38	56	234	CEV second team
6	Canada	30	50	42	45	167	NORCECA second team
7	Argentina	50	50	28	33	161	CSV second team
8	Iran	25	50	26	36	137	AVC first team
9	France	0	30	50	50	130	
10	Serbia	0	2	38	70	110	
11	Japan	40	2	20	30	92	Host
12	Belgium	0	1	34	45	80	
13	Egypt	5	30	10	30	75	CAVB first team
14	Bulgaria	0	2	30	40	72	
15	Netherlands	0	0	18	50	68	
16	Australia	5	3	19	36	63	AVC second team
17	Slovenia	0	0	22	40	62	
18	Cuba	0	20	0	30	50	
19	Finland	0	1	13	33	47	
20	China	0	2	17	25	44	
21	Mexico	0	20	6	14	40	
22	Tunisia	5	3	5	25	38	CAVB second team

=== Qualified teams ===
Team	Confederation	Qualified as	Qualified on	Previous appearances		
Team	Confederation	Qualified as	Qualified on	Total	First	Last
Japan	AVC	Host country	31 January 2013	13	1965	2015
Poland	CEV	World Champions	30 September 2018	6	1965	2015
Iran	AVC	World Ranking for AVC	1 January 2019	3	1991	2015
Australia	AVC	World Ranking for AVC	1 January 2019	2	2007	2015
Egypt	CAVB	World Ranking for CAVB	1 January 2019	7	1977	2015
Tunisia	CAVB	World Ranking for CAVB	1 January 2019	8	1969	2015
Italy	CEV	World Ranking for CEV	1 January 2019	7	1981	2015
Russia^{1}	CEV	World Ranking for CEV	1 January 2019	11	1965	2015
Brazil	CSV	World Ranking for CSV	1 January 2019	11	1969	2011
Argentina	CSV	World Ranking for CSV	1 January 2019	6	1985	2015
United States	NORCECA	World Ranking for NORCECA	1 January 2019	10	1977	2015
Canada	NORCECA	World Ranking for NORCECA	1 January 2019	5	1977	2015

Notes
^{1} Competed as Soviet Union; 5th appearance as Russia.

== Venues ==
Site	First round	Second and Third round	2019 FIVB Volleyball Men's World Cup is located in Japan
A	Fukuoka	Hiroshima	2019 FIVB Volleyball Men's World Cup is located in Japan
A	Marine Messe Fukuoka	Hiroshima Prefectural Sports Center (Green Arena)	2019 FIVB Volleyball Men's World Cup is located in Japan
A	Capacity: 8,500	Capacity: 7,000	2019 FIVB Volleyball Men's World Cup is located in Japan
B	Nagano	Hiroshima	2019 FIVB Volleyball Men's World Cup is located in Japan
B	White Ring	Hiroshima Prefectural Sports Center (Sub Arena)	2019 FIVB Volleyball Men's World Cup is located in Japan
B	Capacity: 5,000	Capacity: 1,200	2019 FIVB Volleyball Men's World Cup is located in Japan

== Format ==
Pool A	Pool B
Japan (Host)	Brazil (1)
United States (2)	Russia (5)
Italy (3)	Canada (6)
Poland (4)	Iran (8)
Argentina (7)	Egypt (13)
Tunisia (22)	Australia (16)

The competition system of the 2019 World Cup was the single Round-Robin system. Each team played once against each of the other 11 teams.

The teams were divided into 2 pools of 6 teams each. In round 1, total 30 matches in 5 days, each teams played against the other teams from the same pool. For rounds 2 and 3, total 36 matches in 6 days, each team played against the teams from another pool. Numbers in brackets denoted the FIVB World Ranking as of 1 January 2019 except the hosts who ranked 11th.

1. Match points
2. Number of matches won
3. Sets ratio
4. Points ratio
5. Result of the last match between the tied teams

Match won 3–0 or 3–1: 3 match points for the winner, 0 match points for the loser
Match won 3–2: 2 match points for the winner, 1 match point for the loser

== Results ==
Pos	Team	Pld	W	L	Pts	SW	SL	SR	SPW	SPL	SPR
1	Brazil	11	11	0	32	33	5	6.600	925	752	1.230
2	Poland	11	9	2	28	30	9	3.333	941	787	1.196
3	United States	11	9	2	27	29	12	2.417	960	778	1.234
4	Japan	11	8	3	22	26	16	1.625	967	902	1.072
5	Argentina	11	6	5	19	24	20	1.200	984	969	1.015
6	Russia	11	5	6	15	20	23	0.870	939	961	0.977
7	Italy	11	5	6	14	19	22	0.864	903	904	0.999
8	Iran	11	4	7	12	19	25	0.760	965	1042	0.926
9	Canada	11	4	7	12	19	28	0.679	976	1058	0.922
10	Egypt	11	2	9	8	15	29	0.517	927	1025	0.904
11	Australia	11	2	9	5	9	29	0.310	790	904	0.874
12	Tunisia	11	1	10	4	6	31	0.194	696	891	0.781

Source: Standings

=== First round ===
==== Site A ====
Date	Time		Score		Set 1	Set 2	Set 3	Set 4	Set 5	Total	Report
1 Oct	12:30	Argentina	3–2	United States	25–21	25–20	19–25	21–25	15–12	105–103	Report
1 Oct	15:00	Poland	3–0	Tunisia	25–16	25–23	25–12			75–51	Report
1 Oct	19:20	Japan	3–0	Italy	25–17	25–19	25–21			75–57	Report
2 Oct	12:30	Tunisia	1–3	Argentina	19–25	18–25	25–23	14–25		76–98	Report
2 Oct	15:00	Italy	1–3	United States	25–19	19–25	14–25	19–25		77–94	Report
2 Oct	19:20	Poland	3–1	Japan	25–23	25–17	19–25	25–17		94–82	Report
4 Oct	12:30	Argentina	2–3	Italy	28–26	25–17	12–25	18–25	10–15	93–108	Report
4 Oct	15:00	United States	3–1	Poland	25–19	25–20	24–26	27–25		101–90	Report
4 Oct	19:20	Japan	3–0	Tunisia	25–23	25–21	25–11			75–55	Report
5 Oct	12:30	Poland	3–1	Argentina	27–29	25–17	25–18	26–24		103–88	Report
5 Oct	15:00	Tunisia	0–3	Italy	19–25	21–25	18–25			58–75	Report
5 Oct	19:20	Japan	0–3	United States	19–25	19–25	21–25			59–75	Report
6 Oct	12:30	Italy	0–3	Poland	18–25	18–25	22–25			58–75	Report
6 Oct	15:00	United States	3–0	Tunisia	25–10	25–18	25–17			75–45	Report
6 Oct	19:20	Argentina	1–3	Japan	19–25	20–25	28–26	22–25		89–101	Report

==== Site B ====
Date	Time		Score		Set 1	Set 2	Set 3	Set 4	Set 5	Total	Report
1 Oct	11:00	Australia	1–3	Egypt	22–25	25–21	23–25	18–25		88–96	Report
1 Oct	14:00	Russia	3–1	Iran	25–21	25–18	24–26	25–22		99–87	Report
1 Oct	18:00	Brazil	3–0	Canada	25–14	25–22	25–14			75–50	Report
2 Oct	11:00	Egypt	3–1	Iran	22–25	26–24	25–18	26–24		99–91	Report
2 Oct	14:00	Russia	3–2	Canada	23–25	16–25	25–17	25–23	15–10	104–100	Report
2 Oct	18:00	Australia	0–3	Brazil	15–25	20–25	17–25			52–75	Report
4 Oct	11:00	Iran	3–1	Canada	18–25	25–23	27–25	25–19		95–92	Report
4 Oct	14:00	Australia	3–2	Russia	25–16	22–25	26–28	25–21	15–12	113–102	Report
4 Oct	18:00	Brazil	3–1	Egypt	25–19	21–25	25–19	25–22		96–85	Report
5 Oct	11:00	Egypt	2–3	Canada	25–27	25–27	25–16	25–22	9–15	109–107	Report
5 Oct	14:00	Brazil	3–0	Russia	25–16	25–22	25–22			75–60	Report
5 Oct	17:00	Australia	1–3	Iran	22–25	25–18	18–25	25–27		90–95	Report
6 Oct	11:00	Russia	3–1	Egypt	25–19	21–25	25–19	25–21		96–84	Report
6 Oct	14:00	Iran	1–3	Brazil	27–25	21–25	25–27	22–25		95–102	Report
6 Oct	17:00	Canada	3–1	Australia	18–25	28–26	25–20	25–22		96–93	Report

=== Second round ===
==== Site A ====
Date	Time		Score		Set 1	Set 2	Set 3	Set 4	Set 5	Total	Report
9 Oct	12:30	Italy	3–0	Egypt	25–19	25–21	25–22			75–62	Report
9 Oct	15:00	Poland	3–1	Russia	25–27	25–21	25–18	25–22		100–88	Report
9 Oct	19:20	Japan	3–0	Australia	25–17	25–22	25–22			75–61	Report
10 Oct	12:30	Poland	3–0	Egypt	25–19	25–18	25–16			75–53	Report
10 Oct	15:00	Italy	3–0	Australia	30–28	25–13	25–22			80–63	Report
10 Oct	19:20	Japan	3–1	Russia	25–22	21–25	25–22	25–16		96–85	Report
11 Oct	12:30	Poland	3–0	Australia	25–18	25–20	25–9			75–47	Report
11 Oct	15:00	Italy	1–3	Russia	25–13	25–27	26–28	12–25		88–93	Report
11 Oct	19:20	Japan	3–2	Egypt	25–14	18–25	25–23	28–30	15–13	111–105	Report

==== Site B ====
Date	Time		Score		Set 1	Set 2	Set 3	Set 4	Set 5	Total	Report
9 Oct	11:00	Tunisia	2–3	Canada	20–25	25–20	27–29	25–20	12–15	109–109	Report
9 Oct	14:00	Argentina	0–3	Brazil	19–25	19–25	24–26			62–76	Report
9 Oct	18:00	United States	3–1	Iran	25–18	22–25	25–18	25–12		97–73	Report
10 Oct	11:00	Argentina	3–0	Canada	25–16	25–22	25–20			75–58	Report
10 Oct	14:00	Tunisia	0–3	Iran	24–26	17–25	22–25			63–76	Report
10 Oct	18:00	United States	0–3	Brazil	23–25	22–25	17–25			62–75	Report
11 Oct	11:00	Argentina	2–3	Iran	25–27	25–23	25–19	17–25	10–15	102–109	Report
11 Oct	14:00	Tunisia	0–3	Brazil	17–25	14–25	13–25			44–75	Report
11 Oct	18:00	United States	3–2	Canada	21–25	25–11	20–25	25–19	15–13	106–93	Report

=== Third round ===
==== Site A ====
Date	Time		Score		Set 1	Set 2	Set 3	Set 4	Set 5	Total	Report
13 Oct	12:30	Canada	3–2	Italy	19–25	25–17	15–25	25–23	18–16	102–106	Report
13 Oct	15:00	Brazil	3–2	Poland	19–25	25–23	25–19	16–25	15–11	100–103	Report
13 Oct	19:20	Japan	3–1	Iran	25–16	26–28	25–13	25–21		101–78	Report
14 Oct	12:30	Poland	3–0	Canada	25–23	26–24	25–20			76–67	Report
14 Oct	15:00	Italy	3–2	Iran	25–27	27–29	30–28	25–17	15–13	122–114	Report
14 Oct	19:20	Japan	1–3	Brazil	17–25	26–24	14–25	25–27		82–101	Report
15 Oct	12:30	Poland	3–0	Iran	25–18	25–18	25–16			75–52	Report
15 Oct	15:00	Italy	0–3	Brazil	20–25	22–25	15–25			57–75	Report
15 Oct	19:20	Japan	3–2	Canada	22–25	25–20	25–23	23–25	15–9	110–102	Report

==== Site B ====
Date	Time		Score		Set 1	Set 2	Set 3	Set 4	Set 5	Total	Report
13 Oct	11:00	Argentina	3–1	Russia	25–23	25–23	21–25	25–16		96–87	Report
13 Oct	14:00	United States	3–0	Australia	25–14	25–13	25–16			75–43	Report
13 Oct	17:00	Tunisia	3–1	Egypt	25–23	14–25	25–17	25–18		89–83	Report
14 Oct	11:00	United States	3–0	Russia	25–23	25–11	25–16			75–50	Report
14 Oct	14:00	Argentina	3–1	Egypt	25–27	25–17	25–22	25–17		100–83	Report
14 Oct	17:00	Tunisia	0–3	Australia	21–25	17–25	21–25			59–75	Report
15 Oct	11:00	United States	3–1	Egypt	22–25	25–16	25–14	25–13		97–68	Report
15 Oct	14:00	Tunisia	0–3	Russia	16–25	16–25	15–25			47–75	Report
15 Oct	18:00	Argentina	3–0	Australia	25–20	25–21	26–24			76–65	Report

== Final standing ==
Rank	Team
1st place, gold medalist(s)	Brazil
2nd place, silver medalist(s)	Poland
3rd place, bronze medalist(s)	United States
4	Japan
5	Argentina
6	Russia
7	Italy
8	Iran
9	Canada
10	Egypt
11	Australia
12	Tunisia

2019 Men's World Cup champions

Brazil
3rd title

Team roster
Bruno Rezende (c), Isac Santos, Maurício Borges Silva, Fernando Kreling, Yoandy Leal, Douglas Souza, Maurício Souza, Lucas Saatkamp, Thales Hoss, Ricardo Lucarelli Souza, Felipe Roque, Alan Souza, Maique Nascimento, Flávio Gualberto
Head coach
Renan dal Zotto

== Awards ==
- Most valuable player
  (Brazil) Alan Souza
- Best setter
  (United States) Micah Christenson
- Best outside spikers
  (Poland) Wilfredo León
  (Japan) Yūki Ishikawa
- Best middle blockers
  (United States) Maxwell Holt
  (Brazil) Lucas Saatkamp
- Best opposite spiker
  (Japan) Yūji Nishida
- Best libero
  (Brazil) Thales Hoss

== Statistics leaders ==
The statistics of each group follows the vis reports P2 and P3. The statistics include 6 volleyball skills; serve, reception, set, spike, block, and dig. The table below shows the top 5 ranked players in each skill plus top scorers as of October 1, 2019.

Best Scorers
	Player	Spikes	Blocks	Serves	Total
1	(Italy) Gabriele Nelli	155	13	17	185
2	(Tunisia) Hamza Nagga	161	3	11	175
3	(Japan) Yūji Nishida	139	6	29	174
4	(Brazil) Alan Souza	140	10	15	165
5	(Japan) Yūki Ishikawa	137	15	9	161

Best Spikers
	Player	Spikes	Faults	Shots	Total	%
1	(Argentina) Agustín Loser	123	13	48	184	66.85
2	(Poland) Wilfredo León	89	15	45	149	59.73
3	(Brazil) Alan Souza	140	30	72	242	57.85
4	(Russia) Fedor Voronkov	121	32	65	218	55.50
5	(Japan) Yūji Nishida	139	47	65	251	55.38

Best Blockers
	Player	Blocks	Faults	Rebounds	Total	Avg
1	(Russia) Ivan Iakovlev	39	26	65	130	0.91
2	(Iran) Aliasghar Mojarad	29	48	66	143	0.66
3	(United States) Maxwell Holt	23	28	36	87	0.56
4	(Brazil) Lucas Saatkamp	20	23	52	95	0.53
5	(Poland) Karol Kłos	20	27	36	83	0.51

Best Servers
	Player	Aces	Faults	Hits	Total	Avg
1	(Japan) Yūji Nishida	29	36	82	147	0.69
2	(United States) Aaron Russell	19	30	104	153	0.46
3	(Russia) Ivan Iakovlev	19	45	116	180	0.44
4	(Brazil) Ricardo Lucarelli	16	18	101	135	0.42
5	(Italy) Gabriele Nelli	17	37	91	145	0.41

Best Setters
	Player	Running	Faults	Still	Total	Avg
1	(Argentina) Matías Sánchez	478	4	419	901	10.86
2	(Italy) Riccardo Sbertoli	378	2	495	875	9.22
3	(United States) Micah Christenson	300	4	345	649	7.32
4	(Brazil) Bruno Rezende	259	4	381	644	6.82
5	(Russia) Sergey Grankin	255	3	333	591	5.93

Best Diggers
	Player	Digs	Faults	Receptions	Total	Avg
1	(Australia) Luke Perry	94	45	37	176	2.47
2	(Brazil) Thales Hoss	86	30	24	140	2.26
3	(Italy) Fabio Balaso	91	42	35	168	2.22
4	(United States) Erik Shoji	82	36	27	145	2.00
5	(Tunisia) Saddem Hmissi	72	30	18	120	1.95

Best Receivers
	Player	Excellents	Faults	Serve	Total	%
1	(Argentina) Santiago Danani	170	10	57	237	67.51
2	(Australia) Luke Perry	116	7	40	163	66.87
3	(Brazil) Thales Hoss	124	9	41	174	66.09
4	(United States) Erik Shoji	112	10	53	175	58.29
5	(Argentina) Jan Martínez	128	7	79	214	56.54
