= 2021 FIVB Men's Volleyball Nations League =

Tournament details
- Host country: Italy
- City: Rimini
- Dates: 28 May – 27 June
- Teams: 16 (from 4 confederations)
- Venue: 1 (in 1 host city)

Final positions
- Champions: Brazil (1st title)
- Runners-up: Poland
- Third place: France
- Fourth place: Slovenia

Tournament awards
- MVP: (Brazil) Wallace de Souza; (Poland) Bartosz Kurek
- Best Setter: (Poland) Fabian Drzyzga
- Best OH: (Brazil) Yoandy Leal; (Poland) Michał Kubiak
- Best MB: (Brazil) Maurício Souza; (Poland) Mateusz Bieniek
- Best OPP: (Brazil) Wallace de Souza; (Poland) Bartosz Kurek
- Best Libero: (Brazil) Thales Hoss

Tournament statistics
- Matches played: 124
- Attendance: 0 (0 per match)

The 2021 FIVB Men's Volleyball Nations League was the third edition of the FIVB Men's Volleyball Nations League, an annual men's international volleyball tournament. The 2021 version of VNL was scheduled to start earlier than the previous edition due to the 2020 Summer Olympics in July. The competition was held between May and June 2021, and the final round took place in Rimini Fiera, Rimini, Italy.

Brazil claimed their first VNL title after beating Poland in four sets. France defeated Slovenia in three sets to win the bronze medal. Both Wallace de Souza from Brazil and Bartosz Kurek from Poland were named as MVPs of the tournament.

== Teams ==
=== Qualification ===
In the 2019 edition sixteen teams qualified for the competition. Twelve of them qualified as core teams which could not face relegation. Other four teams were selected as challenger teams which could be relegated from the tournament. Slovenia as winner of 2019 Challenger Cup earned the right to participate in this tournament replacing Portugal, the last placed challenger team after the 2019 edition. This year there won’t be any promotion or relegation and the 16 participants will also compete in the 2022 edition.

Netherlands replaced China after the decision of the Chinese Volleyball Association to withdraw its national men's team due to financial limitations and travel restrictions caused by the COVID-19 pandemic.

| Country | Confederation | Designation | Previous appearances | | | Previous best performance |
| Country | Confederation | Designation | Total | First | Last | Previous best performance |
|---|---|---|---|---|---|---|
| Argentina | CSV | Core team | 2 | 2018 | 2019 | 7th place (2019) |
| Australia | AVC | Challenger team | 2 | 2018 | 2019 | 13th place (2018, 2019) |
| Brazil | CSV | Core team | 2 | 2018 | 2019 | 4th place (2018, 2019) |
| Bulgaria | CEV | Challenger team | 2 | 2018 | 2019 | 11th place (2018) |
| Canada | NORCECA | Challenger team | 2 | 2018 | 2019 | 7th place (2018) |
| ~~China~~ | ~~AVC~~ | ~~Core team~~ | ~~2~~ | ~~2018~~ | ~~2019~~ | ~~15th place (2018)~~ |
| France | CEV | Core team | 2 | 2018 | 2019 | Runners-up (2018) |
| Germany | CEV | Core team | 2 | 2018 | 2019 | 9th place (2018) |
| Iran | AVC | Core team | 2 | 2018 | 2019 | 5th place (2019) |
| Italy | CEV | Core team | 2 | 2018 | 2019 | 8th place (2018, 2019) |
| Japan | AVC | Core team | 2 | 2018 | 2019 | 10th place (2019) |
| Netherlands | CEV | Challenger team | 0 | None | | Debut |
| Poland | CEV | Core team | 2 | 2018 | 2019 | Third place (2019) |
| Russia | CEV | Core team | 2 | 2018 | 2019 | Champions (2018, 2019) |
| Serbia | CEV | Core team | 2 | 2018 | 2019 | 5th place (2018) |
| Slovenia | CEV | Challenger team | 0 | None | | Debut |
| United States | NORCECA | Core team | 2 | 2018 | 2019 | Runners-up (2019) |

== Format ==
=== Preliminary round ===
The 16 teams compete in a round-robin format. The teams play 3 matches each week and compete five weeks long, for 120 matches. The top four teams after the preliminary round compete in the final round.

=== Final round ===
The four qualified teams play knock-out round. The semifinals winners advance to compete for the Nations League title. The losers face each other in the third place match.

== Secure bubble ==
As to ensure athletes were able to compete and the games were conducted safely, the 2021 VNL was played under a secure bubble. After the game, a total of 2,250 PCR and 7,920 antigen tests were performed and only one registered COVID-19 case was found.

== Venue ==
All matches
Rimini, Italy
Rimini Fiera
Capacity: Unknown

== Competition schedule ==
| ● | Preliminary round | ● | Final round |

| Week 1 28–30 May | Week 2 3–5 Jun | Week 3 9–11 Jun | Week 4 15–17 Jun | Week 5 21–23 Jun | Week 6 26–27 Jun |
|---|---|---|---|---|---|
| 24 matches | 24 matches | 24 matches | 24 matches | 24 matches | 4 matches |

== Pool standing procedure ==
1. Total number of victories (matches won, matches lost)
2. In the event of a tie, the following first tiebreaker will apply: The teams will be ranked by the most points gained per match as follows:
  - Match won 3–0 or 3–1: 3 points for the winner, 0 points for the loser
  - Match won 3–2: 2 points for the winner, 1 point for the loser
  - Match forfeited: 3 points for the winner, 0 points (0–25, 0–25, 0–25) for the loser
3. If teams are still tied after examining the number of victories and points gained, then the FIVB will examine the results in order to break the tie in the following order:
  - Sets quotient: if two or more teams are tied on the number of points gained, they will be ranked by the quotient resulting from the division of the number of all sets won by the number of all sets lost.
  - Points quotient: if the tie persists based on the sets quotient, the teams will be ranked by the quotient resulting from the division of all points scored by the total of points lost during all sets.
  - If the tie persists based on the points quotient, the tie will be broken based on the team that won the match of the Round Robin Phase between the tied teams. When the tie in points quotient is between three or more teams, these teams ranked taking into consideration only the matches involving the teams in question.

== Preliminary round ==
- All times are Central European Summer Time (UTC+02:00).

=== Ranking ===
| Pos | Team | Pld | W | L | Pts | SW | SL | SR | SPW | SPL | SPR | Qualification |
|---|---|---|---|---|---|---|---|---|---|---|---|---|
| 1 | Brazil | 15 | 13 | 2 | 38 | 39 | 12 | 3.250 | 1260 | 1102 | 1.143 | Final round |
| 2 | Poland | 15 | 12 | 3 | 37 | 39 | 11 | 3.545 | 1200 | 985 | 1.218 | Final round |
| 3 | Slovenia | 15 | 12 | 3 | 34 | 40 | 18 | 2.222 | 1342 | 1222 | 1.098 | Final round |
| 4 | France | 15 | 11 | 4 | 34 | 41 | 22 | 1.864 | 1472 | 1382 | 1.065 | Final round |
| 5 | Russia | 15 | 11 | 4 | 34 | 39 | 21 | 1.857 | 1380 | 1293 | 1.067 | |
| 6 | Serbia | 15 | 10 | 5 | 28 | 35 | 27 | 1.296 | 1419 | 1341 | 1.058 | |
| 7 | United States | 15 | 8 | 7 | 24 | 29 | 24 | 1.208 | 1239 | 1159 | 1.069 | |
| 8 | Canada | 15 | 7 | 8 | 21 | 27 | 26 | 1.038 | 1198 | 1170 | 1.024 | |
| 9 | Argentina | 15 | 7 | 8 | 20 | 23 | 29 | 0.793 | 1188 | 1222 | 0.972 | |
| 10 | Italy (H) | 15 | 7 | 8 | 19 | 28 | 33 | 0.848 | 1335 | 1345 | 0.993 | |
| 11 | Japan | 15 | 7 | 8 | 19 | 25 | 31 | 0.806 | 1226 | 1266 | 0.968 | |
| 12 | Iran | 15 | 5 | 10 | 18 | 25 | 32 | 0.781 | 1286 | 1349 | 0.953 | |
| 13 | Germany | 15 | 4 | 11 | 14 | 22 | 38 | 0.579 | 1255 | 1360 | 0.923 | |
| 14 | Netherlands | 15 | 3 | 12 | 11 | 19 | 40 | 0.475 | 1214 | 1354 | 0.897 | |
| 15 | Bulgaria | 15 | 2 | 13 | 7 | 11 | 41 | 0.268 | 1037 | 1238 | 0.838 | |
| 16 | Australia | 15 | 1 | 14 | 2 | 7 | 44 | 0.159 | 980 | 1243 | 0.788 | |

Source: VNL 2021 standings
(H) Host

=== Week 1 ===
| Date | Time | | Score | | Set 1 | Set 2 | Set 3 | Set 4 | Set 5 | Total | Report |
|---|---|---|---|---|---|---|---|---|---|---|---|
| 28 May | 10:00 | France | 3–0 | Bulgaria | 27–25 | 25–21 | 25–23 | | | 77–69 | P2 Report |
| 28 May | 12:00 | Germany | 3–0 | Australia | 25–19 | 25–18 | 25–16 | | | 75–53 | P2 Report |
| 28 May | 13:00 | Japan | 3–0 | Iran | 25–19 | 25–22 | 26–24 | | | 76–65 | P2 Report |
| 28 May | 15:00 | Serbia | 3–1 | Slovenia | 22–25 | 25–18 | 36–34 | 25–18 | | 108–95 | P2 Report |
| 28 May | 16:00 | Netherlands | 1–3 | Russia | 19–25 | 22–25 | 25–18 | 20–25 | | 86–93 | P2 Report |
| 28 May | 18:00 | United States | 3–0 | Canada | 25–17 | 26–24 | 25–20 | | | 76–61 | P2 Report |
| 28 May | 19:30 | Poland | 3–0 | Italy | 25–19 | 25–20 | 25–18 | | | 75–57 | P2 Report |
| 28 May | 21:00 | Brazil | 3–0 | Argentina | 31–29 | 26–24 | 25–16 | | | 82–69 | P2 Report |
| 29 May | 10:00 | Germany | 2–3 | France | 25–22 | 22–25 | 25–22 | 16–25 | 15–17 | 103–111 | P2 Report |
| 29 May | 12:00 | Iran | 1–3 | Russia | 17–25 | 25–20 | 20–25 | 17–25 | | 79–95 | P2 Report |
| 29 May | 13:00 | Netherlands | 2–3 | Japan | 25–22 | 25–23 | 22–25 | 17–25 | 8–15 | 97–110 | P2 Report |
| 29 May | 15:00 | Australia | 0–3 | Bulgaria | 21–25 | 20–25 | 20–25 | | | 61–75 | P2 Report |
| 29 May | 16:00 | Poland | 3–1 | Serbia | 26–24 | 25–19 | 21–25 | 25–15 | | 97–83 | P2 Report |
| 29 May | 18:00 | Italy | 0–3 | Slovenia | 23–25 | 19–25 | 15–25 | | | 57–75 | P2 Report |
| 29 May | 19:30 | Argentina | 0–3 | Canada | 17–25 | 21–25 | 17–25 | | | 55–75 | P2 Report |
| 29 May | 21:00 | United States | 0–3 | Brazil | 22–25 | 23–25 | 19–25 | | | 64–75 | P2 Report |
| 30 May | 10:00 | Australia | 1–3 | France | 26–28 | 25–20 | 14–25 | 23–25 | | 88–98 | P2 Report |
| 30 May | 12:00 | Netherlands | 0–3 | Iran | 18–25 | 23–25 | 28–30 | | | 69–80 | P2 Report |
| 30 May | 13:00 | Germany | 3–2 | Bulgaria | 19–25 | 25–21 | 22–25 | 30–28 | 15–11 | 111–110 | P2 Report |
| 30 May | 15:00 | Russia | 2–3 | Japan | 26–28 | 28–26 | 25–20 | 21–25 | 14–16 | 114–115 | P2 Report |
| 30 May | 16:20 | United States | 3–1 | Argentina | 23–25 | 25–21 | 25–15 | 25–19 | | 98–80 | P2 Report |
| 30 May | 18:25 | Canada | 1–3 | Brazil | 17–25 | 20–25 | 25–22 | 25–27 | | 87–99 | P2 Report |
| 30 May | 19:30 | Poland | 1–3 | Slovenia | 22–25 | 25–23 | 19–25 | 23–25 | | 89–98 | P2 Report |
| 30 May | 21:00 | Serbia | 3–1 | Italy | 25–23 | 22–25 | 25–22 | 25–18 | | 97–88 | P2 Report |

=== Week 2 ===
| Date | Time | | Score | | Set 1 | Set 2 | Set 3 | Set 4 | Set 5 | Total | Report |
|---|---|---|---|---|---|---|---|---|---|---|---|
| 3 Jun | 10:00 | Germany | 2–3 | Argentina | 19–25 | 25–23 | 25–17 | 23–25 | 13–15 | 105–105 | P2 Report |
| 3 Jun | 12:00 | Iran | 3–1 | Canada | 22–25 | 25–22 | 25–22 | 25–22 | | 97–91 | P2 Report |
| 3 Jun | 13:00 | Japan | 1–3 | Serbia | 25–18 | 23–25 | 22–25 | 13–25 | | 83–93 | P2 Report |
| 3 Jun | 15:00 | Brazil | 0–3 | France | 37–39 | 18–25 | 28–30 | | | 83–94 | P2 Report |
| 3 Jun | 16:00 | Netherlands | 0–3 | Slovenia | 18–25 | 15–25 | 18–25 | | | 51–75 | P2 Report |
| 3 Jun | 18:00 | Australia | 0–3 | Poland | 16–25 | 10–25 | 12–25 | | | 38–75 | P2 Report |
| 3 Jun | 19:30 | Italy | 3–2 | Bulgaria | 25–19 | 20–25 | 25–13 | 23–25 | 15–12 | 108–94 | P2 Report |
| 3 Jun | 21:00 | Russia | 3–1 | United States | 25–22 | 25–19 | 17–25 | 25–19 | | 92–85 | P2 Report |
| 4 Jun | 10:00 | Argentina | 0–3 | Slovenia | 19–25 | 22–25 | 18–25 | | | 59–75 | P2 Report |
| 4 Jun | 12:00 | Netherlands | 3–2 | Germany | 25–18 | 23–25 | 25–20 | 23–25 | 15–13 | 111–101 | P2 Report |
| 4 Jun | 13:00 | Brazil | 3–0 | Japan | 25–20 | 25–16 | 25–20 | | | 75–56 | P2 Report |
| 4 Jun | 15:00 | Serbia | 3–2 | France | 22–25 | 24–26 | 25–22 | 25–23 | 15–9 | 111–105 | P2 Report |
| 4 Jun | 16:00 | Iran | 3–1 | Italy | 26–24 | 29–27 | 21–25 | 25–22 | | 101–98 | P2 Report |
| 4 Jun | 18:15 | Poland | 3–0 | United States | 25–17 | 28–26 | 25–17 | | | 78–60 | P2 Report |
| 4 Jun | 19:30 | Russia | 3–0 | Australia | 25–19 | 26–24 | 25–21 | | | 76–64 | P2 Report |
| 4 Jun | 21:00 | Canada | 3–0 | Bulgaria | 28–26 | 25–23 | 25–16 | | | 78–65 | P2 Report |
| 5 Jun | 10:00 | Netherlands | 0–3 | Argentina | 19–25 | 20–25 | 23–25 | | | 62–75 | P2 Report |
| 5 Jun | 12:00 | Slovenia | 1–3 | Germany | 25–19 | 20–25 | 21–25 | 20–25 | | 86–94 | P2 Report |
| 5 Jun | 13:00 | France | 3–2 | Japan | 21–25 | 25–22 | 24–26 | 25–21 | 15–11 | 110–105 | P2 Report |
| 5 Jun | 15:00 | Brazil | 3–1 | Serbia | 23–25 | 25–23 | 25–15 | 25–22 | | 98–85 | P2 Report |
| 5 Jun | 16:00 | Russia | 1–3 | Poland | 25–21 | 19–25 | 19–25 | 14–25 | | 77–96 | P2 Report |
| 5 Jun | 18:00 | United States | 3–0 | Australia | 25–23 | 25–20 | 25–17 | | | 75–60 | P2 Report |
| 5 Jun | 19:30 | Bulgaria | 0–3 | Iran | 20–25 | 31–33 | 22–25 | | | 73–83 | P2 Report |
| 5 Jun | 21:00 | Canada | 2–3 | Italy | 19–25 | 21–25 | 25–21 | 28–26 | 11–15 | 104–112 | P2 Report |

=== Week 3 ===
| Date | Time | | Score | | Set 1 | Set 2 | Set 3 | Set 4 | Set 5 | Total | Report |
|---|---|---|---|---|---|---|---|---|---|---|---|
| 9 Jun | 10:00 | Serbia | 3–1 | Germany | 19–25 | 25–22 | 25–18 | 25–15 | | 94–80 | P2 Report |
| 9 Jun | 12:00 | Japan | 3–1 | Australia | 25–18 | 21–25 | 28–26 | 26–24 | | 100–93 | P2 Report |
| 9 Jun | 13:00 | France | 3–1 | Russia | 22–25 | 25–18 | 30–28 | 25–19 | | 102–90 | P2 Report |
| 9 Jun | 15:00 | Slovenia | 3–0 | Canada | 25–22 | 25–19 | 25–22 | | | 75–63 | P2 Report |
| 9 Jun | 16:30 | Argentina | 0–3 | Italy | 28–30 | 21–25 | 20–25 | | | 69–80 | P2 Report |
| 9 Jun | 18:00 | Iran | 3–0 | United States | 25–19 | 25–23 | 25–23 | | | 75–65 | P2 Report |
| 9 Jun | 19:30 | Poland | 3–0 | Bulgaria | 25–19 | 25–15 | 25–12 | | | 75–46 | P2 Report |
| 9 Jun | 21:00 | Netherlands | 0–3 | Brazil | 19–25 | 22–25 | 25–27 | | | 66–77 | P2 Report |
| 10 Jun | 10:00 | Serbia | 3–2 | Iran | 21–25 | 25–15 | 26–28 | 25–22 | 15–8 | 112–98 | P2 Report |
| 10 Jun | 12:00 | Russia | 3–1 | Canada | 25–18 | 25–18 | 23–25 | 25–23 | | 98–84 | P2 Report |
| 10 Jun | 13:00 | France | 2–3 | Slovenia | 25–17 | 25–19 | 23–25 | 19–25 | 9–15 | 101–101 | P2 Report |
| 10 Jun | 15:00 | Argentina | 3–0 | Australia | 25–18 | 25–19 | 25–20 | | | 75–57 | P2 Report |
| 10 Jun | 16:00 | Germany | 0–3 | United States | 12–25 | 18–25 | 27–29 | | | 57–79 | P2 Report |
| 10 Jun | 18:00 | Bulgaria | 0–3 | Brazil | 16–25 | 22–25 | 12–25 | | | 50–75 | P2 Report |
| 10 Jun | 19:30 | Japan | 3–2 | Italy | 21–25 | 25–22 | 22–25 | 25–15 | 15–9 | 108–96 | P2 Report |
| 10 Jun | 21:00 | Poland | 3–0 | Netherlands | 25–14 | 25–17 | 25–16 | | | 75–47 | P2 Report |
| 11 Jun | 10:00 | Iran | 2–3 | Germany | 25–23 | 20–25 | 19–25 | 25–19 | 13–15 | 102–107 | P2 Report |
| 11 Jun | 12:00 | Slovenia | 3–2 | Russia | 19–25 | 25–23 | 22–25 | 25–20 | 15–8 | 106–101 | P2 Report |
| 11 Jun | 13:00 | Japan | 1–3 | Argentina | 32–30 | 16–25 | 18–25 | 21–25 | | 87–105 | P2 Report |
| 11 Jun | 15:00 | Netherlands | 2–3 | Bulgaria | 18–25 | 25–18 | 25–17 | 22–25 | 13–15 | 103–100 | P2 Report |
| 11 Jun | 16:30 | Australia | 0–3 | Italy | 20–25 | 22–25 | 14–25 | | | 56–75 | P2 Report |
| 11 Jun | 18:00 | United States | 1–3 | Serbia | 23–25 | 17–25 | 25–19 | 25–27 | | 90–96 | P2 Report |
| 11 Jun | 19:30 | Canada | 1–3 | France | 25–20 | 21–25 | 22–25 | 17–25 | | 85–95 | P2 Report |
| 11 Jun | 21:00 | Poland | 0–3 | Brazil | 17–25 | 26–28 | 19–25 | | | 62–78 | P2 Report |

=== Week 4 ===
| Date | Time | | Score | | Set 1 | Set 2 | Set 3 | Set 4 | Set 5 | Total | Report |
|---|---|---|---|---|---|---|---|---|---|---|---|
| 15 Jun | 10:00 | Russia | 3–1 | Serbia | 25–23 | 25–22 | 22–25 | 25–21 | | 97–91 | P2 Report |
| 15 Jun | 12:00 | Iran | 2–3 | Australia | 23–25 | 22–25 | 25–23 | 25–18 | 12–15 | 107–106 | P2 Report |
| 15 Jun | 13:00 | Argentina | 3–1 | Bulgaria | 25–20 | 16–25 | 25–18 | 25–18 | | 91–81 | P2 Report |
| 15 Jun | 15:00 | Japan | 3–0 | Germany | 25–18 | 25–22 | 25–20 | | | 75–60 | P2 Report |
| 15 Jun | 16:30 | Italy | 0–3 | United States | 15–25 | 18–25 | 21–25 | | | 54–75 | P2 Report |
| 15 Jun | 18:00 | Canada | 0–3 | Poland | 22–25 | 23–25 | 19–25 | | | 64–75 | P2 Report |
| 15 Jun | 19:30 | Brazil | 3–2 | Slovenia | 15–25 | 25–22 | 19–25 | 25–13 | 15–12 | 99–97 | P2 Report |
| 15 Jun | 21:00 | Netherlands | 3–2 | France | 15–25 | 22–25 | 28–26 | 25–23 | 19–17 | 109–116 | P2 Report |
| 16 Jun | 10:00 | Argentina | 1–3 | Russia | 19–25 | 23–25 | 25–21 | 19–25 | | 86–96 | P2 Report |
| 16 Jun | 12:00 | Serbia | 3–0 | Bulgaria | 25–20 | 25–17 | 25–17 | | | 75–54 | P2 Report |
| 16 Jun | 13:00 | Slovenia | 3–1 | Australia | 18–25 | 25–18 | 25–18 | 25–17 | | 93–78 | P2 Report |
| 16 Jun | 15:00 | Japan | 0–3 | Poland | 14–25 | 18–25 | 19–25 | | | 51–75 | P2 Report |
| 16 Jun | 16:30 | Netherlands | 1–3 | Italy | 19–25 | 23–25 | 25–23 | 21–25 | | 88–98 | P2 Report |
| 16 Jun | 18:00 | Canada | 3–0 | Germany | 25–17 | 26–24 | 25–21 | | | 76–62 | P2 Report |
| 16 Jun | 19:30 | United States | 1–3 | France | 23–25 | 25–22 | 29–31 | 22–25 | | 99–103 | P2 Report |
| 16 Jun | 21:00 | Iran | 1–3 | Brazil | 19–25 | 25–23 | 19–25 | 21–25 | | 84–98 | P2 Report |
| 17 Jun | 10:00 | Argentina | 3–0 | Serbia | 27–25 | 25–20 | 26–24 | | | 78–69 | P2 Report |
| 17 Jun | 12:00 | Bulgaria | 0–3 | Russia | 17–25 | 22–25 | 17–25 | | | 56–75 | P2 Report |
| 17 Jun | 13:00 | Japan | 0–3 | Canada | 22–25 | 23–25 | 18–25 | | | 63–75 | P2 Report |
| 17 Jun | 15:00 | Australia | 0–3 | Brazil | 17–25 | 22–25 | 12–25 | | | 51–75 | P2 Report |
| 17 Jun | 16:00 | Iran | 1–3 | Slovenia | 25–14 | 20–25 | 19–25 | 30–32 | | 94–96 | P2 Report |
| 17 Jun | 18:00 | Netherlands | 2–3 | United States | 25–21 | 17–25 | 25–23 | 15–25 | 13–15 | 95–109 | P2 Report |
| 17 Jun | 19:30 | France | 2–3 | Italy | 19–25 | 25–22 | 20–25 | 25–21 | 12–15 | 101–108 | P2 Report |
| 17 Jun | 21:00 | Germany | 0–3 | Poland | 22–25 | 19–25 | 20–25 | | | 61–75 | P2 Report |

=== Week 5 ===
| Date | Time | | Score | | Set 1 | Set 2 | Set 3 | Set 4 | Set 5 | Total | Report |
|---|---|---|---|---|---|---|---|---|---|---|---|
| 21 Jun | 10:00 | Australia | 1–3 | Serbia | 16–25 | 13–25 | 25–19 | 15–25 | | 69–94 | P2 Report |
| 21 Jun | 12:00 | Japan | 3–0 | Bulgaria | 25–23 | 25–18 | 25–14 | | | 75–55 | P2 Report |
| 21 Jun | 13:00 | France | 3–0 | Iran | 25–21 | 25–21 | 25–19 | | | 75–61 | P2 Report |
| 21 Jun | 15:00 | Canada | 3–0 | Netherlands | 25–16 | 25–16 | 25–19 | | | 75–51 | P2 Report |
| 21 Jun | 16:30 | Brazil | 3–1 | Italy | 25–19 | 32–30 | 22–25 | 25–20 | | 104–94 | P2 Report |
| 21 Jun | 18:00 | Slovenia | 3–2 | United States | 28–30 | 25–19 | 21–25 | 28–26 | 15–13 | 117–113 | P2 Report |
| 21 Jun | 19:30 | Poland | 3–0 | Argentina | 25–21 | 25–22 | 25–18 | | | 75–61 | P2 Report |
| 21 Jun | 21:00 | Germany | 1–3 | Russia | 18–25 | 18–25 | 25–23 | 15–25 | | 76–98 | P2 Report |
| 22 Jun | 10:00 | Canada | 3–0 | Australia | 25–17 | 25–8 | 25–20 | | | 75–45 | P2 Report |
| 22 Jun | 12:00 | Serbia | 3–2 | Netherlands | 25–21 | 21–25 | 25–18 | 21–25 | 17–15 | 109–104 | P2 Report |
| 22 Jun | 13:00 | Bulgaria | 0–3 | United States | 19–25 | 24–26 | 9–25 | | | 52–76 | P2 Report |
| 22 Jun | 15:00 | Iran | 0–3 | Poland | 20–25 | 20–25 | 16–25 | | | 56–75 | P2 Report |
| 22 Jun | 16:00 | Japan | 0–3 | Slovenia | 16–25 | 16–25 | 26–28 | | | 58–78 | P2 Report |
| 22 Jun | 18:00 | France | 3–0 | Argentina | 26–24 | 25–21 | 25–22 | | | 76–67 | P2 Report |
| 22 Jun | 19:30 | Brazil | 3–0 | Germany | 25–21 | 25–21 | 25–23 | | | 75–65 | P2 Report |
| 22 Jun | 21:00 | Russia | 3–2 | Italy | 25–21 | 16–25 | 25–17 | 19–25 | 15–12 | 100–100 | P2 Report |
| 23 Jun | 10:00 | Australia | 0–3 | Netherlands | 23–25 | 19–25 | 19–25 | | | 61–75 | P2 Report |
| 23 Jun | 12:00 | Canada | 3–2 | Serbia | 17–25 | 21–25 | 25–17 | 25–20 | 17–15 | 105–102 | P2 Report |
| 23 Jun | 13:00 | United States | 3–0 | Japan | 25–21 | 25–23 | 25–20 | | | 75–64 | P2 Report |
| 23 Jun | 15:00 | France | 3–2 | Poland | 25–22 | 21–25 | 22–25 | 25–20 | 15–11 | 108–103 | P2 Report |
| 23 Jun | 16:00 | Iran | 1–3 | Argentina | 31–33 | 23–25 | 32–30 | 18–25 | | 104–113 | P2 Report |
| 23 Jun | 18:00 | Slovenia | 3–0 | Bulgaria | 25–23 | 25–16 | 25–18 | | | 75–57 | P2 Report |
| 23 Jun | 19:30 | Italy | 3–2 | Germany | 25–12 | 24–26 | 25–22 | 21–25 | 15–13 | 110–98 | P2 Report |
| 23 Jun | 21:00 | Brazil | 0–3 | Russia | 21–25 | 26–28 | 20–25 | | | 67–78 | P2 Report |

== Final round ==
- All times are Central European Summer Time (UTC+02:00).

Semi-finals
26 June
Brazil | 3
France | 0
26 June
Poland | 3
Slovenia | 0

Final
27 June
Brazil | 3
Poland | 1
Third place match
27 June
France | 3
Slovenia | 0

=== Semi-finals ===
| Date | Time | | Score | | Set 1 | Set 2 | Set 3 | Set 4 | Set 5 | Total | Report |
|---|---|---|---|---|---|---|---|---|---|---|---|
| 26 Jun | 11:30 | Brazil | 3–0 | France | 25–20 | 25–18 | 25–19 | | | 75–57 | P2 Report |
| 26 Jun | 15:00 | Poland | 3–0 | Slovenia | 25–22 | 25–21 | 25–23 | | | 75–66 | P2 Report |

=== Third place match ===
| Date | Time | | Score | | Set 1 | Set 2 | Set 3 | Set 4 | Set 5 | Total | Report |
|---|---|---|---|---|---|---|---|---|---|---|---|
| 27 Jun | 11:30 | France | 3–0 | Slovenia | 25–20 | 25–18 | 25–19 | | | 75–57 | P2 Report |

=== Final ===
| Date | Time | | Score | | Set 1 | Set 2 | Set 3 | Set 4 | Set 5 | Total | Report |
|---|---|---|---|---|---|---|---|---|---|---|---|
| 27 Jun | 15:00 | Brazil | 3–1 | Poland | 22–25 | 25–23 | 25–16 | 25–14 | | 97–78 | P2 Report |

== Final standing ==
| Rank | Team |
|---|---|
| 1st place, gold medalist(s) | Brazil |
| 2nd place, silver medalist(s) | Poland |
| 3rd place, bronze medalist(s) | France |
| 4 | Slovenia |
| 5 | Russia |
| 6 | Serbia |
| 7 | United States |
| 8 | Canada |
| 9 | Argentina |
| 10 | Italy |
| 11 | Japan |
| 12 | Iran |
| 13 | Germany |
| 14 | Netherlands |
| 15 | Bulgaria |
| 16 | Australia |

2021 Men's VNL champions

Brazil
First title

14–man roster
Bruno Rezende (c), Maurício Borges Silva, Fernando Kreling, Wallace de Souza, Yoandy Leal, Isac Santos, Maurício Souza, Douglas Souza, Maique Nascimento, Lucas Saatkamp, Thales Hoss, Ricardo Lucarelli, Alan Souza, Flávio Gualberto
Head coach
Carlos Schwanke

== Awards ==
- Most Valuable Players
  Wallace de Souza (BRA)
  Bartosz Kurek (POL)
- Best setter
  Fabian Drzyzga (POL)
- Best outside spikers
  Yoandy Leal (BRA)
  Michał Kubiak (POL)
- Best middle blockers
  Maurício Souza (BRA)
  Mateusz Bieniek (POL)
- Best opposite spikers
  Wallace de Souza (BRA)
  Bartosz Kurek (POL)
- Best libero
  Thales Hoss (BRA)

== Statistics leaders ==
=== Preliminary round ===
Statistics leaders correct at the end of preliminary round.

Best Scorers (Note: (Best scorers determined by scored points from spike, block and serve).)
| | Player | Attacks | Blocks | Serves | Total |
|---|---|---|---|---|---|
| 1 | (Netherlands) Nimir Abdel-Aziz | 218 | 10 | 36 | 264 |
| 2 | (Slovenia) Klemen Čebulj | 183 | 17 | 14 | 215 |
| 3 | (Russia) Maksim Mikhaylov | 167 | 17 | 17 | 201 |
| 4 | (Serbia) Marko Ivović | 158 | 12 | 20 | 190 |
| 5 | (Italy) Alessandro Michieletto | 152 | 19 | 10 | 181 |

Best Attackers (Note: (Best attackers determined by successful spikes).)
| | Player | Spikes | Faults | Shots | % | Total |
|---|---|---|---|---|---|---|
| 1 | (Netherlands) Nimir Abdel-Aziz | 218 | 77 | 113 | 53.43 | 408 |
| 2 | (Slovenia) Klemen Čebulj | 200 | 56 | 168 | 47.17 | 424 |
| 3 | (Russia) Maksim Mikhaylov | 167 | 45 | 111 | 51.70 | 323 |
| 4 | (Serbia) Marko Ivović | 158 | 35 | 111 | 51.97 | 304 |
| 5 | (Slovenia) Tonček Štern | 154 | 61 | 97 | 49.36 | 312 |

Best Blockers (Note: (Best blockers determined by the stuff blocks, faults and rebounds).)
| | Player | Blocks | Faults | Rebounds | Avg | Total |
|---|---|---|---|---|---|---|
| 1 | (Serbia) Marko Podraščanin | 44 | 66 | 51 | 2.93 | 161 |
| 2 | (Serbia) Petar Krsmanović | 32 | 63 | 52 | 2.13 | 147 |
| 3 | (Iran) Mohammad Mousavi | 30 | 50 | 28 | 2.14 | 108 |
| 4 | (France) Nicolas Le Goff | 28 | 34 | 46 | 1.65 | 108 |
| 5 | (Germany) Tobias Krick | 28 | 43 | 53 | 2.00 | 124 |

Best Servers (Note: (Best servers determined by aces, faults and hits).)
| | Player | Aces | Faults | Hits | Avg | Total |
|---|---|---|---|---|---|---|
| 1 | (Netherlands) Nimir Abdel-Aziz | 36 | 55 | 94 | 3.00 | 185 |
| 2 | (Poland) Wilfredo León | 32 | 36 | 69 | 2.46 | 137 |
| 3 | (Serbia) Marko Ivović | 20 | 35 | 168 | 1.33 | 223 |
| 4 | (Serbia) Dražen Luburić | 19 | 44 | 62 | 1.27 | 125 |
| 5 | (Germany) Ruben Schott | 18 | 40 | 120 | 1.20 | 178 |

Best Setters (Note: (Best setters determined by running setts, faults and still sets).)
| | Player | Running | Faults | Still | Avg | Total |
|---|---|---|---|---|---|---|
| 1 | (Slovenia) Gregor Ropret | 407 | 6 | 803 | 23.94 | 1216 |
| 2 | (Serbia) Nikola Jovović | 315 | 5 | 663 | 21.00 | 983 |
| 3 | (Germany) Jan Zimmermann | 311 | 10 | 842 | 20.73 | 1163 |
| 4 | (Argentina) Luciano De Cecco | 286 | 5 | 564 | 19.07 | 855 |
| 5 | (Brazil) Bruno Rezende | 282 | 3 | 624 | 16.59 | 909 |

Best Diggers (Note: (Best diggers determined by successful digs, faults and receptions).)
| | Player | Digs | Faults | Receptions | Avg | Total |
| 1 | (Italy) Fabio Balaso | 161 | 48 | 25 | 10.73 | 234 |
| 2 | (Slovenia) Jani Kovačič | 150 | 60 | 7 | 8.82 | 217 |
| 3 | (Germany) Julian Zenger | 141 | 58 | 23 | 9.40 | 222 |
| 4 | (France) Jenia Grebennikov | 137 | 50 | 19 | 9.79 | 206 |
| 5 | (Australia) Luke Perry | 129 | 39 | 14 | 8.60 | 182 |

Best Receivers (Note: (Best receivers determined by efficient receptions, faults and serve receptions).)
| | Player | Excellents | Faults | Serve | % | Total |
|---|---|---|---|---|---|---|
| 1 | (Serbia) Marko Ivović | 123 | 23 | 161 | 40.07 | 307 |
| 2 | (Slovenia) Klemen Čebulj | 123 | 21 | 218 | 33.98 | 362 |
| 3 | (Germany) Julian Zenger | 121 | 20 | 190 | 36.56 | 331 |
| 4 | (Germany) Ruben Schott | 113 | 19 | 150 | 40.07 | 282 |
| 5 | (Slovenia) Jani Kovačič | 109 | 18 | 163 | 37.59 | 290 |

=== Final round ===
Statistics leaders correct at the end of final round.

Best Scorers
| | Player | Attacks | Blocks | Serves | Total |
|---|---|---|---|---|---|
| 1 | (Brazil) Yoandy Leal | 34 | 1 | 2 | 37 |
| 2 | (Brazil) Wallace De Souza | 29 | 4 | 2 | 35 |
| 3 | (Poland) Bartosz Kurek | 29 | 5 | 0 | 34 |
| 4 | (Slovenia) Tonček Štern | 18 | 3 | 3 | 24 |
| 5 | (France) Earvin N'Gapeth | 18 | 1 | 4 | 23 |

Best Attackers
| | Player | Spikes | Faults | Shots | % | Total |
|---|---|---|---|---|---|---|
| 1 | (Brazil) Yoandy Leal | 34 | 5 | 23 | 54.84 | 62 |
| 2 | (Brazil) Wallace De Souza | 29 | 9 | 12 | 58.00 | 50 |
| 3 | (Poland) Bartosz Kurek | 29 | 6 | 14 | 59.18 | 49 |
| 4 | (Slovenia) Tine Urnaut | 21 | 7 | 10 | 55.26 | 38 |
| 5 | (Brazil) Ricardo Lucarelli | 19 | 6 | 13 | 50.00 | 38 |

Best Blockers
| | Player | Blocks | Faults | Rebounds | Avg | Total |
|---|---|---|---|---|---|---|
| 1 | (Brazil) Maurício Souza | 9 | 9 | 10 | 4.50 | 28 |
| 2 | (Poland) Bartosz Kurek | 5 | 4 | 2 | 2.50 | 11 |
| 3 | (Brazil) Wallace De Souza | 4 | 3 | 10 | 2.00 | 17 |
| 4 | (France) Antoine Brizard | 4 | 0 | 3 | 2.00 | 7 |
| 5 | (France) Nicolas Le Goff | 4 | 2 | 4 | 2.00 | 10 |

Best Servers
| | Player | Aces | Faults | Hits | Avg | Total |
|---|---|---|---|---|---|---|
| 1 | (France) Earvin N'Gapeth | 4 | 8 | 17 | 2.00 | 29 |
| 2 | (Poland) Wilfredo León | 3 | 5 | 21 | 1.50 | 29 |
| 3 | (Poland) Fabian Drzyzga | 3 | 4 | 21 | 1.50 | 28 |
| 4 | (Slovenia) Tonček Štern | 3 | 5 | 15 | 1.50 | 23 |
| 5 | (Slovenia) Alen Pajenk | 3 | 6 | 17 | 1.50 | 26 |

Best Setters
| | Player | Running | Faults | Still | Avg | Total |
|---|---|---|---|---|---|---|
| 1 | (Brazil) Bruno Rezende | 40 | 1 | 111 | 20.00 | 152 |
| 2 | (Poland) Fabian Drzyzga | 40 | 0 | 104 | 20.00 | 144 |
| 3 | (Slovenia) Gregor Ropret | 32 | 0 | 94 | 16.00 | 126 |
| 4 | (France) Antoine Brizard | 22 | 0 | 56 | 11.00 | 78 |
| 5 | (France) Benjamin Toniutti | 7 | 0 | 30 | 3.50 | 37 |

Best Diggers
| | Player | Digs | Faults | Receptions | Avg | Total |
|---|---|---|---|---|---|---|
| 1 | (Slovenia) Jani Kovačič | 18 | 4 | 2 | 9.00 | 24 |
| 2 | (Brazil) Thales Hoss | 16 | 3 | 1 | 8.00 | 20 |
| 3 | (Poland) Paweł Zatorski | 16 | 7 | 3 | 8.00 | 26 |
| 4 | (Brazil) Bruno Rezende | 15 | 5 | 0 | 7.50 | 20 |
| 5 | (Brazil) Ricardo Lucarelli | 15 | 7 | 3 | 7.50 | 25 |

Best Receivers
| | Player | Excellents | Faults | Serve | % | Total |
|---|---|---|---|---|---|---|
| 1 | (Slovenia) Klemen Čebulj | 17 | 2 | 22 | 41.46 | 41 |
| 2 | (France) Earvin N'Gapeth | 13 | 3 | 28 | 29.55 | 44 |
| 3 | (France) Trevor Clevenot | 13 | 2 | 18 | 39.39 | 33 |
| 4 | (Poland) Paweł Zatorski | 13 | 2 | 25 | 32.50 | 40 |
| 5 | (Brazil) Thales Hoss | 11 | 2 | 11 | 45.83 | 24 |

== COVID related ==
Because of COVID-19 restrictions, the games were played without spectators. A total of 10,170 COVID-19 tests (including women's side) were conducted to players, referees, officials and staff every four days.

== See also ==
- 2019 FIVB Volleyball Men's Challenger Cup
- Volleyball at the 2020 Summer Olympics
