= Maxwell Holt =

American volleyball player (born 1987)

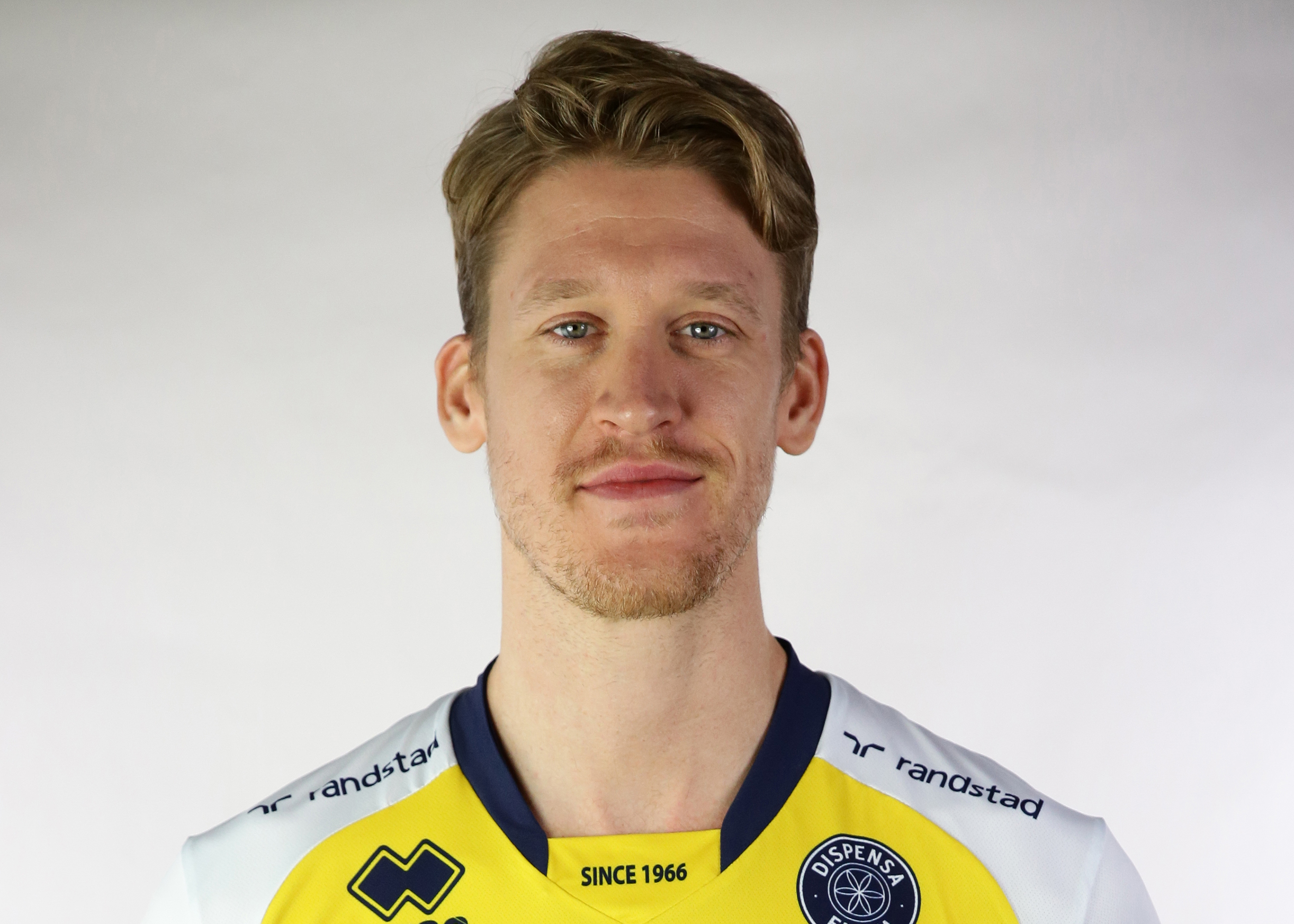
- Holt in 2019

Personal information
- Full name: Maxwell Philip Holt
- Born: March 12, 1987 (age 39); Cincinnati, Ohio, U.S.
- Height: 6 ft 9 in (2.05 m)
- Weight: 200 lb (90 kg)
- Spike: 138 in (351 cm)
- Block: 131 in (333 cm)
- Education: Pennsylvania State University

Volleyball information
- Position: Middle blocker

Career
| Years | Teams |
|---|---|
| 2006–2009; 2009–2010; 2010–2013; 2013–2016; 2016–2020; 2020–2021; 2021–2022; 2022–2024 | Penn State Nittany Lions; Marmi Lanza Verona; Volley Piacenza; Dynamo Moscow; Modena Volley; Vero Volley Monza; Gas Sales Piacenza; Beijing BAIC Motor |

National team
| 2009– | United States |
Medal record
Men's volleyball
Representing United States
Olympic Games
| Bronze medal – third place | 2016 Rio de Janeiro | Team |
| Bronze medal – third place | 2024 Paris | Team |
FIVB World Championship
| Bronze medal – third place | 2018 Italy/Bulgaria |
FIVB World Cup
| Gold medal – first place | 2015 Japan |
| Gold medal – first place | 2023 Japan |
| Bronze medal – third place | 2019 Japan |
FIVB World League
| Gold medal – first place | 2014 Florence |
| Bronze medal – third place | 2015 Rio de Janeiro |
FIVB Nations League
| Silver medal – second place | 2019 Chicago |
| Silver medal – second place | 2023 Gdańsk |
| Bronze medal – third place | 2018 Lille |
NORCECA Championship
| Gold medal – first place | 2013 Langley |
| Gold medal – first place | 2017 Colorado Springs |
| Gold medal – first place | 2023 Charleston |
| Silver medal – second place | 2011 Mayaguez |

Maxwell Philip Holt (born March 12, 1987) is an American professional volleyball player who plays as a middle blocker for Beijing BAIC Motor of the Chinese league and the U.S. national team. Holt was a bronze medalist at the 2016 and 2024 Summer Olympics, and won gold medals in the 2014 World League, 2015 World Cup, and 2023 World Cup.

== Career ==
=== National team ===
Holt was a member of the U.S. Junior Men's National Team from 2005–2007. He played in the Four Nations Tournament in 2005, the NORCECA Men's Junior Continental Championship in 2006, and the FIVB Volleyball Men's U21 World Championship where the team finished seventh. Holt joined the National Team in 2009, debuting in the Pan American Cup. In September 2013, the U.S. team, including Holt, won the NORCECA Championship. On July 20, 2014, he won the gold medal in the 2014 World League.

== Honors ==
=== Club ===
- CEV Cup
  - 2014–15 – with Dynamo Moscow
- CEV Challenge Cup
  - 2012–13 – with Copra Elior Piacenza
- Domestic
  - 2016–17 Italian SuperCup, with Azimut Modena
  - 2018–19 Italian SuperCup, with Azimut Modena
  - 2022–23 Chinese Championship, with Beijing BAIC Motor

=== Individual awards ===
- 2013: FIVB World Grand Champions Cup – Best middle blocker
- 2015: FIVB World League – Best middle blocker
- 2019: FIVB Nations League – Best middle blocker
- 2019: FIVB World Cup – Best middle blocker

== See also ==
- List of Pennsylvania State University Olympians

Awards
| Preceded by (United States) David Lee (Brazil) Lucas Saatkamp | Best Middle Blocker of FIVB World League; 2015 ex aequo (Serbia) Srećko Lisinac | Succeeded by (Serbia) Srećko Lisinac (Brazil) Maurício Souza |
| Preceded by (France) Kévin Le Roux (Russia) Dmitry Muserskiy | Best Middle Blocker of FIVB Nations League; 2019 ex aequo (Russia) Ivan Iakovlev | Succeeded by (Brazil) Maurício Souza (Poland) Mateusz Bieniek |
