= Maurício Souza (volleyball) =

Brazilian politician and former volleyball player

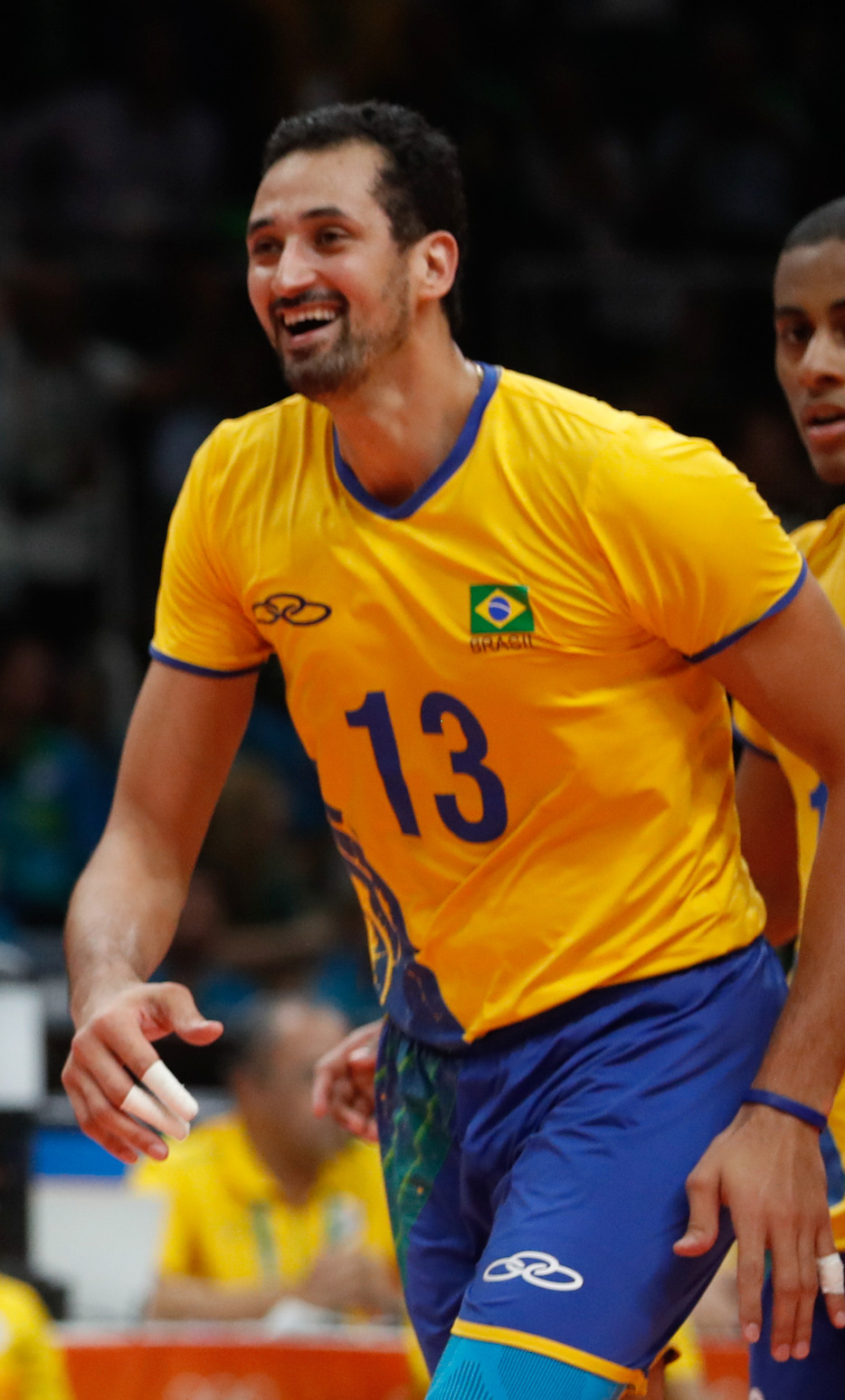
- Souza in 2016

Member of the Chamber of Deputies
- Incumbent
- Assumed office 1 February 2023
- Constituency: Minas Gerais

Personal details
- Born: Maurício Luiz de Silva; 29 September 1988 (age 38) Iturama, Minas Gerais, Brazil
- Party: PL (2022–present)
- Spouse: Isabella Saldanha Castro
- Children: 2
- Volleyball career
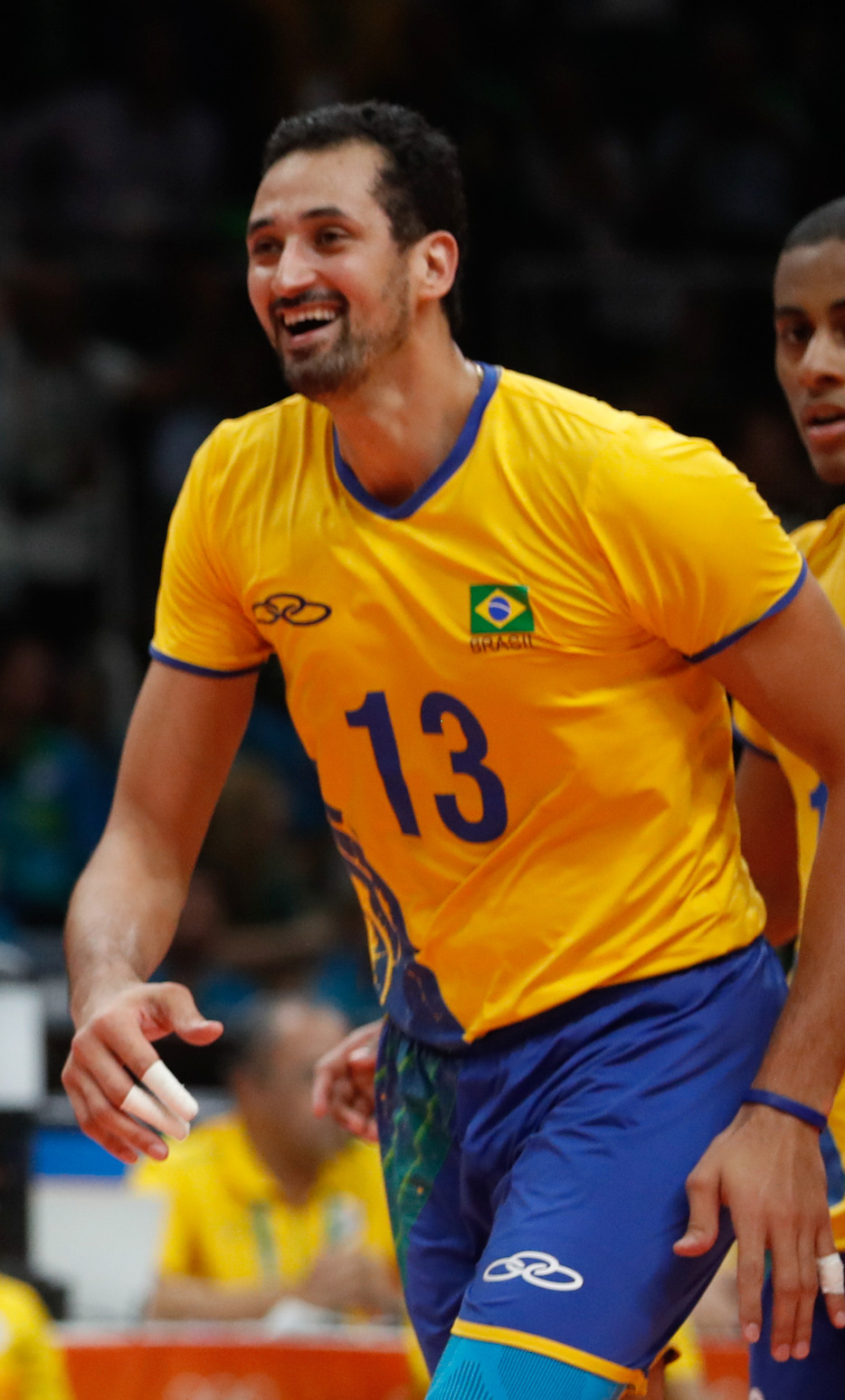

Personal information
- Height: 2.09 m (6 ft 10 in)
- Weight: 105 kg (231 lb)

Volleyball information
- Position: Middle blocker
- Current club: Retired

Career
Years	Teams
2007–2008; 2008–2011; 2011–2012; 2012–2013; 2013; 2013–2014; 2014–2015; 2015–2017; 2017–2019; 2019–2021; 2021	(Brazil) Sport Club Ulbra (Brazil) Brasil Vôlei Clube (Brazil) Vôlei Futuro (Brazil) Minas Tênis Clube (Brazil) RJ Vôlei (Turkey) Halkbank Ankara (Brazil) Vôlei Taubaté (Brazil) Brasil Vôlei Clube (Brazil) SESC RJ (Brazil) Vôlei Taubaté (Brazil) Minas Tênis Clube

National team
2011–2021	Brazil
Honours
Men's volleyball
Representing Brazil
Olympic Games
Gold medal – first place	2016 Rio de Janeiro
FIVB World Championship
Silver medal – second place	2018 Italy/Bulgaria
FIVB World Cup
Gold medal – first place	2019 Japan
FIVB World Grand Champions Cup
Gold medal – first place	2013 Japan
Gold medal – first place	2017 Japan
FIVB Nations League
Gold medal – first place	2021 Rimini
FIVB World League
Silver medal – second place	2013 Mar del Plata
Silver medal – second place	2014 Florence
Silver medal – second place	2016 Kraków
Silver medal – second place	2017 Curitiba
Pan American Games
Gold medal – first place	2011 Guadalajara
Silver medal – second place	2015 Toronto
Pan American Cup
Gold medal – first place	2013 Mexico City
CSV South American Championship
Gold medal – first place	2013 Cabo Frio
Gold medal – first place	2015 Maceió
Gold medal – first place	2017 Chile
FISU World University Games
Bronze medal – third place	2011 Shenzhen
FIVB U21 World Championship
Gold medal – first place	2007 Casablanca/Rabat

Maurício Luiz de Souza (born 29 September 1988) is a Brazilian politician, former volleyball player, member of the Brazil men's national volleyball team, 2016 Olympic Champion, silver medallist of the 2018 World Championship, gold medallist of the 2019 World Cup, three–time South American Champion (2013, 2015, 2017), 2014 Turkish Champion. He was sacked from the Minas Tênis Clube and the national team in October 2021 after sharing a post about Jon Kent, the son of Superman, being revealed to be bisexual.

He later joined the Liberal Party in 2022. He participated as a candidate in the parliamentary elections in the same year, being elected as a federal deputy from the state of Minas Gerais.

== Personal life ==
Maurício Souza is married to Isabella Saldanha Castro and has two children, a girl and a boy.

=== Statements about homosexuals ===
Souza has posted homophobic messages on his social networks in the past, which generated controversy. In 2014 he made a post against homosexuality but apologized after a public backlash. Another made in 2017 was removed ten hours later.

In 2021, Souza criticized the comic character Jonathan Samuel Kent, who in the DC Universe is the son of Superman/Clark Kent and Lois Lane, for being revealed as bisexual. After a negative reaction, Fiat and Gerdau, sponsors of Minas Tênis Clube, the team the athlete works for, demanded measures from the club's board of directors and repudiated the player's attitude. The sports team then decided to fine and temporarily remove Souza, in addition to stating that "the player's opinions do not represent the beliefs of the partner sports institution" and that he should recant. The organized supporters Independente Minas also released a statement in which it said it "will ignore the athlete Maurício Souza in social networks, games and demonstrations".

After the controversy, Souza published a message of retraction for the statements on his Twitter account. However, on October 27, 2021, the team terminated their contract with him. Renan Dal Zotto, coach of the Brazilian Men's Volleyball Team, said he "was disappointed" with the conduct of Maurício Souza and that "there is no room for homophobic professionals" in the selection. As a result, Souza lost his place within the national team. 20 federal deputies from 13 states and seven political parties lodged complaints against him with the Public Ministry of Minas Gerais.

== Sporting achievements ==
=== Clubs ===
- CEV Champions League
  - 2013/2014 – with Halkbank Ankara
- CSV South American Club Championship
  - Florianópolis 2009 – with Brasil Vôlei Clube
  - Belo Horizonte 2013 – with Vivo/Minas
- National championships
  - 2013/2014 Turkish SuperCup, with Halkbank Ankara
  - 2013/2014 Turkish Cup, with Halkbank Ankara
  - 2013/2014 Turkish Championship, with Halkbank Ankara
  - 2014/2015 Brazilian Cup, with Vôlei Taubaté
  - 2019/2020 Brazilian SuperCup, with Vôlei Taubaté
  - 2020/2021 Brazilian SuperCup, with Vôlei Taubaté

=== Individual awards ===
- 2013: Pan American Cup – Best Middle Blocker
- 2013: Pan American Cup – Best Blocker
- 2016: FIVB World League – Best Middle Blocker
- 2020: CSV South American Club Championship – Best Middle Blocker
- 2021: FIVB Nations League – Best Middle Blocker

== Politics ==
Souza is a public supporter of Jair Bolsonaro. Shortly after the defeat of the Brazilian volleyball team at the 2020 Summer Olympics in Tokyo, he was received by Jair Bolsonaro and his son, Eduardo Bolsonaro (PSL), at Palácio do Planalto, in Brasília. On the occasion, Souza presented the politicians with t-shirts of the Brazilian volleyball team. His support for the Bolsonaro family had been known since 2018, when he and Wallace de Souza, his national team partner, went viral on the internet after posing for a photo in which they made, with their fingers, the number 17, which represented Bolsonaro in the ballot boxes during the 2018 Brazilian presidential election.

After his firing for his homophobic comments, Souza joined the Liberal Party in March 2022 to run for the position of federal deputy for Minas Gerais in the 2022 election. Souza said that he was running because there was a need for more officials who supported President Jair Bolsonaro. He won by a margin of over 83,000 votes.
