= Maique Nascimento =

Brazilian volleyball player (born 1997)

Personal information
- Full name: Maique Reis Nascimento
- Born: 16 July 1997 (age 29); Santo Antônio do Amparo, MG, Brazil
- Height: 1.82 m (6 ft 0 in)
- Weight: 76 kg (168 lb)

Volleyball information
- Position: Libero
- Current club: Minas Tênis Clube
- Number: 15

Career
Years	Teams
2016–2017; 2017–	Uberlândia/Gabarito; Minas Tênis Clube

National team
2018–	Brazil
Honours
Men's volleyball
Representing Brazil
FIVB World Championship
Silver medal – second place	2018 Italy/Bulgaria
Bronze medal – third place	2022 Poland/Slovenia	Team
FIVB World Cup
Gold medal – first place	2019 Japan
FIVB Nations League
Gold medal – first place	2021 Rimini
Bronze medal – third place	2025 Ningbo
Pan American Games
Gold medal – first place	2023 Santiago
CSV South American Championship
Gold medal – first place	2019 Chile
Gold medal – first place	2021 Brasília
Silver medal – second place	2023 Recife

Maique Reis Nascimento (born 16 July 1997) is a Brazilian professional volleyball player. He is a member of the Brazil national team, the 2019 World Cup and the 2021 Nations League winner. At the professional club level, he plays for Minas Tênis Clube.

== Honours ==
=== Club ===
- FIVB Club World Championship
  - Bangalore 2023 – with Minas Tênis Clube
- CSV South American Club Championship
  - Contagem 2022 – with Minas Tênis Clube
  - Araguari 2023 – with Minas Tênis Clube
- Domestic
  - 2021–22 Brazilian Cup, with Minas Tênis Clube

=== Youth national team ===
- 2017 U21 Pan American Cup

=== Individual awards ===
- 2017: FIVB U21 World Championship – Best libero
- 2023: FIVB Club World Championship – Best libero
- 2025: FIVB Nations League – Best libero

== Personal life ==
Maique is openly gay.
