= Ricardo Lucarelli =

Brazilian volleyball player (born 1992)

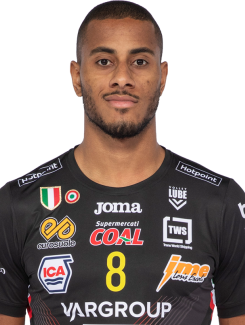
- Lucarelli in 2021

Personal information
- Full name: Ricardo Samuel Lucarelli Santos de Souza
- Born: 14 February 1992 (age 34); Contagem, Brazil
- Height: 1.96 m (6 ft 5 in)
- Weight: 90 kg (198 lb)
- Spike: 355 cm (140 in)
- Block: 340 cm (134 in)

Volleyball information
- Position: Outside hitter
- Current club: JTEKT Stings

Career
Years	Teams
2010–2013; 2013–2015; 2015–2020; 2020–2021; 2021–2022; 2022–2024; 2024–2025	Minas Tênis Clube; SESI São Paulo; Vôlei Taubaté; Itas Trentino; Cucine Lube Civitanova; Gas Sales Piacenza; JTEKT Stings

National team
2011–	Brazil
Honours
Men's volleyball
Representing Brazil
Olympic Games
Gold medal – first place	2016 Rio de Janeiro
FIVB World Championship
Silver medal – second place	2014 Poland
Bronze medal – third place	2022 Poland/Slovenia
FIVB World Cup
Gold medal – first place	2019 Japan
FIVB World Grand Champions Cup
Gold medal – first place	2013 Japan
Gold medal – first place	2017 Japan
FIVB Nations League
Gold medal – first place	2021 Rimini
Bronze medal – third place	2025 Ningbo
FIVB World League
Silver medal – second place	2013 Mar del Plata
Silver medal – second place	2014 Florence
Silver medal – second place	2016 Kraków
Silver medal – second place	2017 Curitiba
CSV South American Championship
Gold medal – first place	2013 Cabo Frio
Gold medal – first place	2015 Maceió
Gold medal – first place	2017 Santiago/Temuco
Gold medal – first place	2021 Brasília
Silver medal – second place	2023 Recife

Ricardo Samuel Lucarelli Santos de Souza (born 14 February 1992) is a Brazilian professional volleyball player who plays as an outside hitter for JTEKT Stings and the Brazil national team. He was a gold medallist in the men's tournament at the Olympic Games Rio 2016 and the 2019 World Cup winner.

== Career ==
=== Club ===
In 2010, he started playing for Minas Tênis Clube. In 2013, he signed a contract with SESI São Paulo, and in 2015, he was hired by the club Funvic Taubaté.

=== National team ===
The young Lucarelli defended the junior national team in 2010, winning the gold medal in the South American Championship. The following year, he was in the group that finished fifth in the World Championship. In 2013 Lucarelli won the World Grand Champions Cup, a gold medal at the South American Championship and a silver medal at the World League, where he was named the Best outside spiker (together with Ivan Zaytsev). In 2014, he was a major player in the Brazilian team, which won the silver medal at the World League 2014 in Florence, Italy. He was again named the Best outside spiker, together with teammate Murilo Endres. Lucarelli was one of the Bernardinho team's starters; Lucarelli was on the court in all the games of the FIVB World League and the conquest of the South American Games in 2015. In 2016, Lucarelli was a key player in the gold medal campaign at the Rio Olympic Games. Lucarelli was part of the team that won the gold medal at the 2016 Olympic Games in Rio de Janeiro. He played the last three games against Argentina (quarterfinals), Russia (semifinals), and Italy (finals).

== Honours ==
=== Club ===
- FIVB Club World Championship
  - Betim 2021 – with Cucine Lube Civitanova
- CSV South American Club Championship
  - Belo Horizonte 2013 – with Minas Tênis Clube
  - Taubate 2016 – with Vôlei Taubaté
- Domestic
  - 2018–19 Brazilian Championship, with Vôlei Taubaté
  - 2022–23 Italian Cup, with Gas Sales Piacenza

=== Youth national team ===
- 2013 FIVB U23 World Championship

=== Individual awards ===
- 2009: FIVB U19 World Championship – Best receiver
- 2013: CSV South American Club Championship – Best server
- 2013: FIVB U23 World Championship – Most valuable player
- 2013: FIVB World League – Best outside spiker
- 2013: CSV South American Championship – Best outside spiker
- 2014: FIVB World League – Best outside spiker
- 2014: FIVB World Championship – Best outside spiker
- 2016: CSV South American Club Championship – Best outside spiker
- 2016: Olympic Games – Best outside spiker
- 2017: FIVB World League – Best outside spiker
- 2017: CSV South American Championship – Best outside spiker
- 2017: FIVB World Grand Champions Cup – Best outside spiker
- 2017: FIVB World Grand Champions Cup – Most valuable player
- 2021: CSV South American Championship – Best outside spiker
- 2023: CSV South American Championship – Best outside spiker

Awards
Preceded by First Award	Best Outside Spiker of FIVB World League; 2013 ex aequo (Italy) Ivan Zaytsev; 2014 ex aequo (United States) Taylor Sander; 2017 ex aequo (France) Earvin N'Gapeth	Succeeded by FIVB Nations League
Preceded by First Award	Best Outside Spiker of FIVB World Championship; 2014 ex aequo (Brazil) Murilo Endres	Succeeded by (Poland) Michał Kubiak (Brazil) Douglas Souza
Preceded by First Award	Best Outside Spiker of Olympic Games; 2016 ex aequo (United States) Aaron Russell	Succeeded by (France) Earvin N'Gapeth (Russia) Egor Kliuka
Preceded by (Italy) Filippo Lanza (Russia) Dmitriy Ilinykh	Best Outside Spiker of FIVB World Grand Champions Cup; 2017 ex aequo (Iran) Milad Ebadipour	Succeeded by TBD
Preceded by (Russia) Dmitriy Muserskiy	Most Valuable Player of FIVB World Grand Champions Cup; 2017	Succeeded by TBD
