= 2013 FIVB Volleyball Men's World Grand Champions Cup =

2013 Men's World Grand Champions Cup
Tournament details
- Host country: Japan
- Dates: 19–24 November
- Teams: 6 (from 4 confederations)
- Venue: 2 (in 2 host cities)

Final positions
- Champions: Brazil (4th title)
- Runners-up: Russia
- Third place: Italy
- Fourth place: Iran

Tournament awards
- MVP: (Russia) Dmitriy Muserskiy
- Best Setter: (Brazil) Bruno Rezende
- Best OH: (Italy) Filippo Lanza (Russia) Dmitriy Ilinikh
- Best MB: (United States) Maxwell Holt (Italy) Emanuele Birarelli
- Best OPP: (Brazil) Wallace de Souza
- Best Libero: (Iran) Farhad Zarif

Tournament statistics
- Matches played: 15

The 2013 FIVB Volleyball Men's World Grand Champions Cup was held in Kyoto and Tokyo, Japan from 19 to 24 November 2013.

== Qualification ==
Team	Qualified as
Japan	Hosts
Iran	2013 Asian Champions
Russia	2013 European Champions
United States	2013 North American Champions
Brazil	2013 South American Champions
Italy	Wild Card

== Competition formula ==
The competition formula of the 2013 Men's World Grand Champions Cup was a single Round-Robin system. Each team played once against each of the five remaining teams. Points were accumulated during the whole tournament, and the final standing was determined by the total points gained.

== Venues ==
Kyoto round	Tokyo round
Kyoto, Japan	Tokyo, Japan
Kyoto Prefectural Gymnasium	Tokyo Metropolitan Gymnasium
Capacity: 5,496	Capacity: 10,000

== Pool standing procedure ==
1. Match points
2. Number of matches won
3. Sets ratio
4. Points ratio
5. Result of the last match between the tied teams

Match won 3–0 or 3–1: 3 match points for the winner, 0 match points for the loser
Match won 3–2: 2 match points for the winner, 1 match point for the loser

== Results ==
- All times are Japan Standard Time (UTC+09:00).

Pos	Team	Pld	W	L	Pts	SW	SL	SR	SPW	SPL	SPR
1	Brazil	5	4	1	12	14	6	2.333	461	428	1.077
2	Russia	5	4	1	11	13	5	2.600	432	380	1.137
3	Italy	5	2	3	9	12	10	1.200	498	477	1.044
4	Iran	5	3	2	7	10	10	1.000	439	450	0.976
5	United States	5	2	3	6	8	12	0.667	466	460	1.013
6	Japan	5	0	5	0	1	15	0.067	295	396	0.745

=== Kyoto round ===
Date	Time		Score		Set 1	Set 2	Set 3	Set 4	Set 5	Total	Report
19 Nov	12:10	Italy	3–1	Russia	28–26	25–20	19–25	27–25		99–96	P2 P3
19 Nov	16:10	Iran	1–3	Brazil	16–25	17–25	27–25	23–25		83–100	P2 P3
19 Nov	19:10	United States	3–1	Japan	25–17	25–17	21–25	25–20		96–79	P2 P3
20 Nov	12:10	Italy	2–3	Iran	24–26	25–16	23–25	25–23	12–15	109–105	P2 P3
20 Nov	16:10	Brazil	3–0	United States	31–29	25–23	25–23			81–75	P2 P3
20 Nov	19:10	Russia	3–0	Japan	25–16	25–17	25–18			75–51	P2 P3

=== Tokyo round ===
Date	Time		Score		Set 1	Set 2	Set 3	Set 4	Set 5	Total	Report
22 Nov	12:10	United States	3–2	Italy	25–21	20–25	22–25	28–26	15–13	110–110	P2 P3
22 Nov	16:10	Iran	0–3	Russia	23–25	23–25	19–25			65–75	P2 P3
22 Nov	19:10	Japan	0–3	Brazil	17–25	23–25	18–25			58–75	P2 P3
23 Nov	12:10	Iran	3–2	United States	28–26	19–25	19–25	27–25	18–16	111–117	P2 P3
23 Nov	16:10	Russia	3–2	Brazil	20–25	22–25	25–21	25–17	15–9	107–97	P2 P3
23 Nov	19:10	Italy	3–0	Japan	25–16	25–21	25–21			75–58	P2 P3
24 Nov	12:10	Brazil	3–2	Italy	25–22	25–22	23–25	20–25	15–11	108–105	P2 P3
24 Nov	15:10	United States	0–3	Russia	27–29	22–25	19–25			68–79	P2 P3
24 Nov	18:10	Japan	0–3	Iran	17–25	18–25	14–25			49–75	P2 P3

== Final standing ==
Rank	Team
1st place, gold medalist(s)	Brazil
2nd place, silver medalist(s)	Russia
3rd place, bronze medalist(s)	Italy
4	Iran
5	United States
6	Japan

2013 Men's World Grand Champions Cup champions

Brazil
4th title

14–man roster
Bruno (c), Éder, Wallace, Sidão, Lucarelli, Evandro, Thiago, Lipe, M. Souza, Lucas Lóh, Lucas, Maurício, Mario Jr., Raphael
Head coach
Bernardinho

== Awards ==
- Most valuable player
  (Russia) Dmitriy Muserskiy
- Best setter
  (Brazil) Bruno Rezende
- Best Outside Spikers
  (Italy) Filippo Lanza
  (Russia) Dmitriy Ilinikh
- Best Middle Blockers
  (United States) Maxwell Holt
  (Italy) Emanuele Birarelli
- Best opposite spiker
  (Brazil) Wallace de Souza
- Best libero
  (Iran) Farhad Zarif
