= FIVB Volleyball World Grand Champions Cup =

International volleyball competition for national teams

- Sport: Volleyball
- Founded: 1993
- First season: 1993 (Men, Women)
- Folded: 2017 (Men, Women)
- Replaced by: FIVB Volleyball World Championship
- No. of teams: 6
- Continent: International (FIVB)
- Last champions: M: Brazil (5th title); W: China (2nd title)
- Most titles: M: Brazil (5 titles); W: Brazil; China (2 titles each)

The FIVB Volleyball World Grand Champions Cup was an international volleyball competition contested by the senior men's and women's national teams of the members of Fédération Internationale de Volleyball (FIVB), the sport's global governing body. The tournament was created in 1993 after radical changes made on the biggest tournaments organised by the FIVB. The main goal was not to have a single year without two high-profile world-level volleyball competitions, alongside the pre-existing men's and women's world championship, men's and women's world cup and the volleyball tournament at the Olympic Games which are all quadrennial and the annual men's and women's Nations League.

The World Grand Champions Cup was therefore played quadrennially the year after the Olympic Games and is always hosted by the Japan Volleyball Association. It did not give any points for the World Ranking.

Brazil has been the most successful team in the men's tournament, having won five of the seven editions. Brazil has also finished runners-up to Cuba and Italy in the only two occasions claimed by other national teams. The women's tournament history is more balanced with Brazil and China having won the tournament twice, while Cuba, Italy, and Russia have won one title each.

== History ==
The World Grand Champions Cup was created in 1993 after radical changes made on the biggest tournaments organised by the FIVB. The main goal was not to have a single year without a world FIVB competition. This is the only FIVB tournament that doesn't give FIVB points for the world ranking.

On 22 June 2023, Volleyball Calendar 2025–2028 approved by FIVB shown that World Championships to be played biannually in odd years. That meant the World Grand Champions Cup was discontinued and replaced by World Championships.

=== Winners ===
Brazil has been the most successful team with the men's team winning five and the women's team two titles.

== Competition formula ==
The World Grand Champions Cup has always had the same formula since the first edition:

- The competition takes place in Japan.
- Six teams participate in each event: host nation, four continental champions and one wild card.
- Japan is always pre-qualified as the host nation.
- Four continental champions from continents whose teams reached the highest ranking at the preceding Olympic Games.
- The remaining team participates through a wild card granted by the FIVB.
- A round robin format is used for this competition.
- Final standings are calculated by usual volleyball criteria: until 2013 match points, numbers of matches won, sets ratio (the total number of sets won divided by the total number of sets lost), points ratio, direct confrontation; since 2017 the first criterion became the number of matches won, followed by match points, sets ratio etc.

== Result summary ==
=== Men ===
Year	Round-robin					
Year	Champions	Runners-up	3rd placers	4th placers	5th placers	6th placers
1993; Details	Italy	Brazil	Cuba	Japan	United States	South Korea
1997; Details	Brazil	Netherlands	Cuba	China	Japan	Australia
2001; Details	Cuba	Brazil	Yugoslavia	South Korea	Japan	Argentina
2005; Details	Brazil	United States	Italy	Japan	Egypt	China
2009; Details	Brazil	Cuba	Japan	Poland	Iran	Egypt
2013; Details	Brazil	Russia	Italy	Iran	United States	Japan
2017; Details	Brazil	Italy	Iran	United States	France	Japan

=== Women ===
Year	Round-robin					
Year	Champions	Runners-up	3rd placers	4th placers	5th placers	6th placers
1993; Details	Cuba	China	Russia	Japan	United States	Peru
1997; Details	Russia	Cuba	Brazil	China	Japan	South Korea
2001; Details	China	Russia	Japan	Brazil	United States	South Korea
2005; Details	Brazil	United States	China	Poland	Japan	South Korea
2009; Details	Italy	Brazil	Dominican Republic	Japan	South Korea	Thailand
2013; Details	Brazil	United States	Japan	Russia	Thailand	Dominican Republic
2017; Details	China	Brazil	United States	Russia	Japan	South Korea

== Medal summary ==
=== Men ===
Rank	Nation	Gold	Silver	Bronze	Total
1	Brazil	5	2	0	7
2	Cuba	1	1	2	4
2	Italy	1	1	2	4
4	Netherlands	0	1	0	1
4	Russia	0	1	0	1
4	United States	0	1	0	1
7	Iran	0	0	1	1
7	Japan	0	0	1	1
7	Yugoslavia	0	0	1	1
Totals (9 entries)		7	7	7	21

=== Women ===
Rank	Nation	Gold	Silver	Bronze	Total
1	Brazil	2	2	1	5
2	China	2	1	1	4
3	Russia	1	1	1	3
4	Cuba	1	1	0	2
5	Italy	1	0	0	1
6	United States	0	2	1	3
7	Japan	0	0	2	2
8	Dominican Republic	0	0	1	1
Totals (8 entries)		7	7	7	21

== All-time team records ==
Number of matches
1	Japan	35
2	Brazil	30
3	Republic of Korea	25
4	China	25
5	Russia	25
6	United States	25
7	Cuba	10
8	Dominican Republic	10
9	Thailand	10
10	Poland	5

Wins
1	Brazil	22
2	China	19
3	Russia	14
4	United States	14
5	Japan	13
6	Cuba	9
7	Italy	5
8	Dominican Republic	4
9	Republic of Korea	3
10	Poland	1

Number of wins in games played
1	Italy	100 %
2	Cuba	90 %
3	China	76 %
4	Brazil	73 %
5	Russia	56 %
6	United States	56 %
7	Dominican Republic	40 %
8	Japan	37 %
9	Poland	20 %
10	Republic of Korea	12 %

(Based on W=2 pts and D=1 pts)

	Team	S	Firs	Best	Pts	MP	W	L	GF	GA	diff
1	Brazil	6	1997	1st	52	30	22	8	76	32	+44
2	Japan	7	1993	3rd	48	35	13	22	55	74	-19
3	China	5	1993	1st	44	25	19	6	61	32	+29
4	Russia	5	1993	1st	39	25	14	11	55	45	+10
5	United States	5	1993	2nd	39	25	14	11	52	48	+4
6	Republic of Korea	5	1997	5th	28	25	3	22	14	71	-57
7	Cuba	2	1993	1st	19	10	9	1	28	10	+18
8	Dominican Republic	2	2009	3rd	14	10	4	6	15	20	-5
9	Thailand	2	2009	5th	11	10	1	9	8	28	-20
10	Italy	1	2009	1st	10	5	5	0	15	3	+12
11	Poland	1	2005	5th	6	5	1	4	7	14	-7
12	Peru	1	1993	6th	5	5	0	5	6	15	-9

== Most valuable player by edition ==
=== Men ===
- 1993 – Gilson Bernardo (BRA)
- 1997 – Nalbert Bitencourt (BRA)
- 2001 – Ivan Miljković (YUG)
- 2005 – André Nascimento (BRA)
- 2009 – Robertlandy Simón (CUB)
- 2013 – Dmitriy Muserskiy (RUS)
- 2017 – Ricardo Lucarelli (BRA)

=== Women ===
- 1993 – Regla Bell (CUB)
- 1997 – Yevgeniya Artamonova (RUS)
- 2001 – Yang Hao (CHN)
- 2005 – Sheilla Castro (BRA)
- 2009 – Simona Gioli (ITA)
- 2013 – Fabiana Claudino (BRA)
- 2017 – Zhu Ting (CHN)

== See also ==
- Volleyball at the Summer Olympics
- FIVB Men's Volleyball Nations League
- FIVB Men's Volleyball World Cup
- FIVB Men's Volleyball World Cup
- FIVB Men's Volleyball Challenger Cup
- FIVB Volleyball World League
- FIVB Volleyball World Grand Prix
- FIVB Women's Volleyball Nations League
- FIVB Women's Volleyball World Cup
- FIVB Women's Volleyball World Cup
- FIVB Women's Volleyball Challenger Cup
- List of indoor volleyball world medalists
