= 2022 FIVB Volleyball Men's Club World Championship squads =

This article shows the rosters of all participating teams at the 2022 FIVB Volleyball Men's Club World Championship in Betim, Brazil.

== Itambé Minas ==
The following is the roster of the Brazilian club Itambé Minas in the 2022 FIVB Volleyball Men's Club World Championship.

No.	Name	Date of birth	Height	Position
1	(Cuba) Luis Estrada	10 March 2000	2.05 m (6 ft 9 in)	outside hitter
3	(Brazil) Kelvi Souza	15 June 2001	2.05 m (6 ft 9 in)	middle blocker
4	(Brazil) Rhendrick Resley	11 February 1999	1.84 m (6 ft 0 in)	setter
6	(Brazil) Paulo Vinicios Silva	23 August 2001	1.98 m (6 ft 6 in)	outside hitter
7	(Brazil) William Arjona	31 July 1979	1.86 m (6 ft 1 in)	setter
8	(Brazil) Leandro Vissotto	30 April 1983	2.12 m (6 ft 11 in)	opposite hitter
10	(Brazil) Matheus Santos	23 April 1996	2.09 m (6 ft 10 in)	middle blocker
11	(Brazil) Henrique Meireles	20 June 2002	1.95 m (6 ft 5 in)	outside hitter
14	(Brazil) Edson Paixão	29 March 2000	2.03 m (6 ft 8 in)	middle blocker
15	(Brazil) Maique Nascimento	16 July 1997	1.82 m (6 ft 0 in)	libero
17	(Brazil) André Saliba	27 August 1999	2.01 m (6 ft 7 in)	opposite hitter
18	(Brazil) Henrique Honorato	18 March 1997	1.90 m (6 ft 3 in)	outside hitter
19	(Brazil) Arthur Bento	8 June 2004	2.08 m (6 ft 10 in)	outside hitter
20	(Brazil) Marcus Vinícius Coelho	29 September 2000	2.01 m (6 ft 7 in)	outside hitter
Head coach:		(Brazil) Nery Tambeiro		

== Paykan Club ==
The following is the roster of the Iranian club Paykan Club in the 2022 FIVB Volleyball Men's Club World Championship.

No.	Name	Date of birth	Height	Position
1	(Iran) Amir Reza Sarlak	10 May 2001	2.03 m (6 ft 8 in)	middle blocker
2	(Iran) Amirhossein Saberi Joshaghani	26 December 1999	1.99 m (6 ft 6 in)	setter
5	(Iran) Mohammad Fallah	3 March 1993	2.01 m (6 ft 7 in)	middle blocker
7	(Iran) Hamzeh Zarini	18 October 1985	1.98 m (6 ft 6 in)	outside hitter
8	(Iran) Mohammad Reza Hazratpour	31 March 1999	1.83 m (6 ft 0 in)	libero
9	(Iran) Ali Shafiei	21 September 1991	1.98 m (6 ft 6 in)	middle blocker
10	(Iran) Amin Esmaeilnezhad	1 January 1998	2.04 m (6 ft 8 in)	opposite
11	(Iran) Armin Afshin Far	10 April 1998	2.05 m (6 ft 9 in)	outside hitter
13	(Iran) Mashhadi Seyed Mohammad Reza	14 September 2000	1.93 m (6 ft 4 in)	outside hitter
14	(Iran) Aslani Reza	15 February 1994	1.65 m (5 ft 5 in)	libero
16	(Iran) Armin Tashakkori	8 December 1986	1.98 m (6 ft 6 in)	middle blocker
17	(Iran) Purya Fayazi	12 January 1993	1.94 m (6 ft 4 in)	outside hitter
18	(Iran) Mohammad Taher Vadi	10 November 1989	1.94 m (6 ft 4 in)	setter
20	(Iran) Rezaei Topragh Ghale Reza	22 December 1996	1.98 m (6 ft 6 in)	opposite
Head coach:		(Iran) Peyman Akbari		

== Sada Cruzeiro Vôlei ==
The following is the roster of the Brazilian club Sada Cruzeiro Vôlei in the 2022 FIVB Volleyball Men's Club World Championship.

No.	Name	Date of birth	Height	Position
1	(Brazil) Welinton Oppenkoski	28 March 2000	1.95 m (6 ft 5 in)	opposite
2	(Brazil) Guilherme Henrique	12 November 2003	1.96 m (6 ft 5 in)	middle blocker
3	(Brazil) Lucas de Deus	26 January 1987	1.78 m (5 ft 10 in)	libero
4	(Brazil) Otávio Pinto	27 February 1991	2.02 m (6 ft 8 in)	middle blocker
5	(Argentina) Nicolás Uriarte	21 March 1990	1.89 m (6 ft 2 in)	setter
7	(Brazil) Lucas Bauer	20 October 1999	1.92 m (6 ft 4 in)	libero
8	(Brazil) Wallace de Souza	26 June 1987	1.98 m (6 ft 6 in)	opposite
10	(Brazil) Cledenílson Batista	9 June 1998	2.10 m (6 ft 11 in)	middle blocker
11	(Brazil) Rodrigo Leão	5 June 1996	1.97 m (6 ft 6 in)	outside hitter
12	(Brazil) Rodrigo Ribeiro	13 February 1986	1.90 m (6 ft 3 in)	setter
15	(Brazil) Gabriel Vaccari	25 December 1996	1.91 m (6 ft 3 in)	outside hitter
16	(Brazil) Lucas Saatkamp	6 March 1986	2.10 m (6 ft 11 in)	middle blocker
18	(Brazil) Carlos Castro	27 February 2004	2.03 m (6 ft 8 in)	outside hitter
19	(Cuba) Miguel Ángel López	25 March 1997	1.90 m (6 ft 3 in)	outside hitter
Head coach:		(Brazil) Filipe Ferraz		

== Sir Sicoma Monini Perugia ==
The following is the roster of the Italian club Sir Safety Monini Perugia in the 2022 FIVB Volleyball Men's Club World Championship.

No.	Name	Date of birth	Height	Position
6	(Italy) Simone Giannelli	9 August 1996	1.90 m (6 ft 3 in)	setter
7	(Cuba) Jesús Herrera	4 April 1995	1.91 m (6 ft 3 in)	opposite
8	(Luxembourg) Kamil Rychlicki	1 November 1996	1.82 m (6 ft 0 in)	opposite
9	(Poland) Wilfredo León	31 July 1993	2.02 m (6 ft 8 in)	outside hitter
10	(Italy) Alessandro Piccinelli	30 January 1997	2.00 m (6 ft 7 in)	libero
11	(Italy) Sebastián Solé	12 June 1991	2.02 m (6 ft 8 in)	middle blocker
12	(Italy) Roberto Russo	23 February 1997	2.05 m (6 ft 9 in)	middle blocker
13	(Italy) Massimo Colaci	21 February 1985	1.95 m (6 ft 5 in)	libero
15	(Brazil) Flávio Gualberto	22 April 1993	2.01 m (6 ft 7 in)	middle blocker
16	(Poland) Kamil Semeniuk	16 July 1996	1.93 m (6 ft 4 in)	outside hitter
17	(Ukraine) Oleh Plotnytskyi	5 June 1997	1.98 m (6 ft 6 in)	outside hitter
20	(Slovenia) Gregor Ropret	1 March 1989	2.03 m (6 ft 8 in)	setter
21	(Cuba) Julio César Cardenas	4 September 2000	1.63 m (5 ft 4 in)	outside hitter
23	(Italy) Stefano Mengozzi	6 May 1985	1.63 m (5 ft 4 in)	middle blocker
Head coach:		(Italy) Andrea Anastasi		

== Trentino Itas ==
The following is the roster of the Italian club Trentino Itas in the 2022 FIVB Volleyball Men's Club World Championship.

No.	Name	Date of birth	Height	Position
1	(Bulgaria) Matey Kaziyski	23 September 1984	2.03 m (6 ft 8 in)	outside hitter
2	(Italy) Gabriele Nelli	4 December 1993	1.98 m (6 ft 6 in)	opposite
3	(Belgium) Wout D'Heer	26 April 2001	2.03 m (6 ft 8 in)	middle blocker
4	(Czech Republic) Donovan Džavoronok	23 July 1997	2.00 m (6 ft 7 in)	outside hitter
5	(Italy) Alessandro Michieletto	5 December 2001	2.05 m (6 ft 9 in)	outside hitter
6	(Italy) Riccardo Sbertoli	23 May 1998	1.90 m (6 ft 3 in)	setter
7	(Italy) Oreste Cavuto	5 December 1996	2.00 m (6 ft 7 in)	outside hitter
8	(Italy) Domenico Pace	2 October 2000	1.90 m (6 ft 3 in)	libero
10	(Italy) Martin Berger	3 April 2003	2.03 m (6 ft 8 in)	middle blocker
11	(Italy) Niccolò Depalma	9 November 2002	1.90 m (6 ft 3 in)	setter
13	(Italy) Gabriele Laurenzano	12 June 2003	1.76 m (5 ft 9 in)	libero
15	(Italy) Daniele Lavia	4 November 1999	1.95 m (6 ft 5 in)	outside hitter
18	(Serbia) Marko Podraščanin	29 August 1987	2.03 m (6 ft 8 in)	middle blocker
20	(Serbia) Srećko Lisinac	17 May 1992	2.05 m (6 ft 9 in)	middle blocker
Head coach:		(Italy) Angelo Lorenzetti		

== Vôlei Renata ==
The following is the roster of the Brazilian club Vôlei Renata in the 2022 FIVB Volleyball Men's Club World Championship.

No.	Name	Date of birth	Height	Position
2	(Brazil) Bryan Boll	31 March 2003	1.96 m (6 ft 5 in)	libero
3	(Brazil) Samuel Santos	4 April 2005	2.02 m (6 ft 8 in)	middle blocker
4	(Brazil) Lucas Borges	19 December 1992	2.02 m (6 ft 8 in)	opposite
6	(Brazil) Adriano Cavalcante	6 February 2002	2.01 m (6 ft 7 in)	outside hitter
7	(Brazil) Everaldo Lucena da Silva	28 May 1985	1.94 m (6 ft 4 in)	setter
8	(Argentina) Demián González	21 February 1983	1.92 m (6 ft 4 in)	setter
10	(Argentina) Nicolás Lazo	16 April 1995	1.92 m (6 ft 4 in)	outside hitter
11	(Brazil) João Franck	9 March 1999	2.01 m (6 ft 7 in)	outside hitter
12	(Brazil) Lucas Lima	4 January 2001	1.95 m (6 ft 5 in)	outside hitter
14	(Brazil) Lucas Adriano Barreto	24 June 1997	1.95 m (6 ft 5 in)	middle blocker
16	(Brazil) Felipe Brito	1 October 1998	2.05 m (6 ft 9 in)	middle blocker
17	(Brazil) Alexandre Elias	30 September 1997	1.90 m (6 ft 3 in)	libero
18	(Brazil) Felipe Roque	19 May 1997	2.12 m (6 ft 11 in)	opposite
19	(Brazil) Lucas Fonseca	19 June 1997	2.05 m (6 ft 9 in)	middle blocker
Head coach:		(Argentina) Horacio Dileo		
