= Mengozzi =

Mengozzi is an Italian surname. Notable people with the surname include:

- Fabio Mengozzi (born 1980), Italian composer and pianist
- Stefano Mengozzi (born 1985), Italian volleyball player
- Gerolamo Mengozzi Colonna (1688–1744), Italian painter

== See also ==
- Mingozzi
