= Kamil Semeniuk =

Polish volleyball player (born 1996)

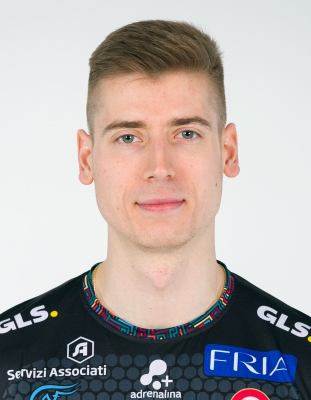
- Semeniuk in 2022

Personal information
- Born: 16 July 1996 (age 30); Kędzierzyn-Koźle, Poland
- Height: 1.94 m (6 ft 4 in)
- Weight: 84 kg (185 lb)
- Spike: 352 cm (139 in)
- Block: 326 cm (128 in)

Volleyball information
- Position: Outside hitter
- Current club: Sir Safety Perugia
- Number: 16

Career
Years	Teams
2015–2018; 2018–2019; 2019–2022; 2022–	ZAKSA Kędzierzyn-Koźle; Warta Zawiercie; ZAKSA Kędzierzyn-Koźle; Sir Safety Perugia

National team
2021–	Poland
Honours
Men's volleyball
Representing Poland
Olympic Games
Silver medal – second place	2024 Paris	Team
FIVB World Championship
Silver medal – second place	2022 Poland/Slovenia
Bronze medal – third place	2025 Philippines
FIVB Nations League
Gold medal – first place	2023 Gdańsk
Gold medal – first place	2025 Ningbo
Gold medal – first place	2026 Ningbo
Silver medal – second place	2021 Rimini
Bronze medal – third place	2022 Bologna
Bronze medal – third place	2024 Łódź
CEV European Championship
Gold medal – first place	2023 Italy/Bulgaria/North Macedonia/Israel
Gold medal – first place	2026 Bulgaria/Finland/Italy/Romania
Bronze medal – third place	2021 Poland/Czechia/Estonia/Finland

Kamil Semeniuk (born 16 July 1996) is a Polish professional volleyball player who plays as an outside hitter for Lega Pallavolo Serie A club Sir Safety Perugia and the Poland national team, with which he won silver medal at the 2024 Summer Olympics.

He is also a silver medallist at the 2022 World Championship, and a four-time Champions League winner (2021, 2022, 2025, 2026) with ZAKSA and Perugia.

== Career ==
=== Club ===
In 2015, he joined the senior team of ZAKSA Kędzierzyn-Koźle, and made his debut in the PlusLiga. He won three Polish Championships, three Polish Cups, two Polish SuperCups and two CEV Champions League titles with the team. In 2022, he joined Sir Safety Perugia and won the Italian SuperCup the same year.

=== National team ===
In 2021, he made his debut in the Poland national team in a match against Belgium. At the 2022 World Championship he won a silver medal with his national team, losing to Italy in four sets in the final. In 2024, he won the silver medal at the 2024 Summer Olympic Games in Paris.

== Honours ==
=== Club ===
- CEV Champions League
  - 2020–21 – with ZAKSA Kędzierzyn-Koźle
  - 2021–22 – with ZAKSA Kędzierzyn-Koźle
  - 2024–25 – with Sir Safety Umbria Volley
  - 2025–26 – with Sir Safety Umbria Volley
- FIVB Club World Championship
  - Betim 2022 – with Sir Safety Susa Perugia
  - Bangalore 2023 – with Sir Sicoma Perugia
  - Belem 2025, with Sir Sicoma Perugia
- Domestic
  - 2015–16 Polish Championship, with ZAKSA Kędzierzyn-Koźle
  - 2016–17 Polish Cup, with ZAKSA Kędzierzyn-Koźle
  - 2016–17 Polish Championship, with ZAKSA Kędzierzyn-Koźle
  - 2019–20 Polish SuperCup, with ZAKSA Kędzierzyn-Koźle
  - 2020–21 Polish SuperCup, with ZAKSA Kędzierzyn-Koźle
  - 2020–21 Polish Cup, with ZAKSA Kędzierzyn-Koźle
  - 2021–22 Polish Cup, with ZAKSA Kędzierzyn-Koźle
  - 2021–22 Polish Championship, with ZAKSA Kędzierzyn-Koźle
  - 2022–23 Italian SuperCup, with Sir Safety Perugia
  - 2023–24 Italian SuperCup, with Sir Susa Perugia
  - 2023–24 Italian Cup, with Sir Susa Perugia
  - 2023–24 Italian Championship, with Sir Susa Perugia
  - 2024–25 Italian SuperCup, with Sir Susa Perugia

=== Universiade ===
- 2019 Summer Universiade

=== Individual awards ===
- 2021: Polish Cup – Most valuable player
- 2022: CEV Champions League – Most valuable player
- 2022: FIVB World Championship – Best outside spiker
- 2022: CEV – Male volleyball player of the year
- 2023: Italian Championship – Best server

Awards
Preceded by (Poland) Michał Kubiak (Brazil) Douglas Souza	Best Outside Spiker of FIVB World Championship; 2022 ex aequo (Brazil) Yoandy Leal	Succeeded by (Bulgaria) Aleksandar Nikolov (Italy) Alessandro Michieletto
