= Sebastián Solé =

Argentine volleyball player (born 1991)

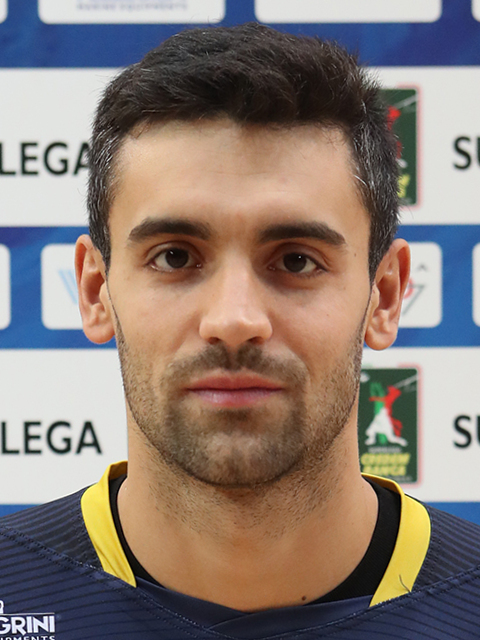
- Solé in 2019

Personal information
- Nationality: Argentina; Italy
- Born: 12 June 1991 (age 35); Rosario, Argentina
- Height: 2.02 m (6 ft 8 in)
- Weight: 95 kg (209 lb)
- Spike: 370 cm (146 in)
- Block: 360 cm (142 in)

Volleyball information
- Position: Middle blocker
- Current club: Sir Safety Perugia
- Number: 11

Career
Years	Teams
2008–2010; 2010–2013; 2013–2017; 2017–2018; 2018–2020; 2020–	Rosario Sonder; Bolívar Vóley; Trentino Volley; Vôlei Taubaté; Calzedonia Verona; Sir Safety Perugia

National team
Argentina
Honours
Men's volleyball
Representing Argentina
Olympic Games
Bronze medal – third place	2020 Tokyo
Pan American Games
Gold medal – first place	2015 Toronto
Bronze medal – third place	2011 Guadalajara
CSV South American Championship
Silver medal – second place	2011 Brazil
Silver medal – second place	2013 Brazil

Sebastián Solé (born 12 June 1991) is an Argentine volleyball player, a former member of the Argentina national team and a bronze medallist at the Olympic Games (Tokyo 2020). At the professional club level, he plays for Sir Safety Perugia.

== Junior career ==
Solé's international career began in 2007 as one of the new players called up for the Argentine Youth Team. In 2008, he was the only player on both of Argentina's South American Championship winning teams, representing Argentina in the youth and junior teams.

== Career ==
In 2010, Solé made his senior debut for Argentina at the FIVB World League. He participated seven times in that competition and won several awards and medals. He was also part of the team at the 2010 FIVB World Championship in Italy and at the Olympic Games in London in 2012. In 2015, Solé was the first Argentine player in 18 years to be part of an Italian A1 League winning team. He also shone in 2016 at the 2016 Summer Olympics and won the Olympia Award for being the best volleyball player of the country.

After winning the bronze medal in Tokyo Olympics, he announced his retirement from the Argentine national team.

== Honours ==
=== Clubs ===
- CEV Champions League
  - 2015–16, with Diatec Trentino
  - 2024–25, with Sir Sicoma Monini Perugia
- FIVB Club World Championship
  - 2022, with Sir Safety Susa Perugia
  - 2023, with Sir Sicoma Perugia
  - 2025, with Sir Sicoma Perugia
- CSV South American Club Championship
  - 2010, with Bolívar Vóley
- Domestic
  - 2013–14 Italian SuperCup, with Diatec Trentino
  - 2014–15 Italian Championship, with Diatec Trentino
  - 2020–21 Italian SuperCup, with Sir Safety Perugia
  - 2020–21 Italian Championship, with Sir Safety Perugia
  - 2021–22 Italian Cup, with Sir Safety Perugia
  - 2021–22 Italian Championship, with Sir Safety Perugia
  - 2022–23 Italian Super Cup, with Sir Safety Perugia
  - 2023–24 Italian Super Cup, with Sir Susa Perugia
  - 2023–24 Italian Cup, with Sir Susa Perugia
  - 2023–24 Italian Championship, with Sir Susa Perugia
  - 2024–25 Italian Super Cup, with Sir Susa Perugia
  - 2024–25 Italian Championship, with Sir Susa Perugia

=== Individual awards ===
- 2009: FIVB U19 World Championship – Best blocker
- 2011: CSV South American Championship – Best blocker
- 2013: CSV South American Championship – Best middle blocker
- 2015: FIVB World Cup – Best middle blocker
- 2016: CEV Champions League – Best middle blocker
- 2023: FIVB Club World Championship – Best middle blocker

Awards
Preceded by (Poland) Marcin Możdżonek	Best Middle Blocker of FIVB World Cup; 2015 ex aequo (Iran) Mohammad Mousavi	Succeeded by (United States) Maxwell Holt (Brazil) Lucas Saatkamp
Preceded by (Poland) Piotr Nowakowski (Netherlands) Rob Bontje	Best Middle Blocker of CEV Champions League; 2015/2016 ex aequo (United States) Russell Holmes	Succeeded by (Serbia) Marko Podraščanin (Russia) Artem Volvich
