= Alessandro Piccinelli =

Italian volleyball player (born 1997)

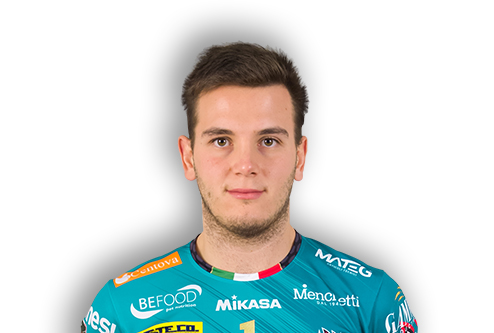
- Piccinelli in 2019

Personal information
- Born: 30 January 1997 (age 29) Milan, Italy
- Height: 1.89 m (6 ft 2 in)

Sport
- Country: Italy
- Sport: Volleyball
- Club: Sir Safety Conad Perugia
Medal record
European Championship
| Gold medal – first place | 2021 Poland/Czechia/Estonia/Finland |

Alessandro Piccinelli (born 30 January 1997) is an Italian volleyball player who won 2021 European Championship.

== Honours ==
=== Clubs ===
- CEV Champions League
  - 2024–25, with Sir Sicoma Monini Perugia
- FIVB Club World Championship
  - 2022, with Sir Safety Susa Perugia
  - 2023, with Sir Sicoma Perugia
- Domestic
  - 2019–20 Italian SuperCup, with Sir Safety Perugia
  - 2019–20 Italian Championship, with Sir Susa Perugia
  - 2020–21 Italian SuperCup, with Sir Safety Perugia
  - 2020–21 Italian Championship, with Sir Safety Perugia
  - 2021–22 Italian Cup, with Sir Safety Perugia
  - 2021–22 Italian Championship, with Sir Safety Perugia
  - 2022–23 Italian Super Cup, with Sir Safety Perugia
  - 2023–24 Italian Super Cup, with Sir Susa Perugia
  - 2023–24 Italian Cup, with Sir Susa Perugia
  - 2023–24 Italian Championship, with Sir Susa Perugia
  - 2024–25 Italian Super Cup, with Sir Susa Perugia
  - 2024–25 Italian Championship, with Sir Susa Perugia

=== National team ===
- Men's European Volleyball Championship
  - 2021 – Gold medal
