= Mingozzi =

Mingozzi is an Italian surname. Notable people with the surname include:

- Fulvio Mingozzi (1925–2000), Italian actor
- Gianfranco Mingozzi (1932–2009), Italian film director and screenwriter
- Gionata Mingozzi (1984–2008), Italian footballer

== See also ==
- Mengozzi
