= Marko Podraščanin =

Serbian volleyball player

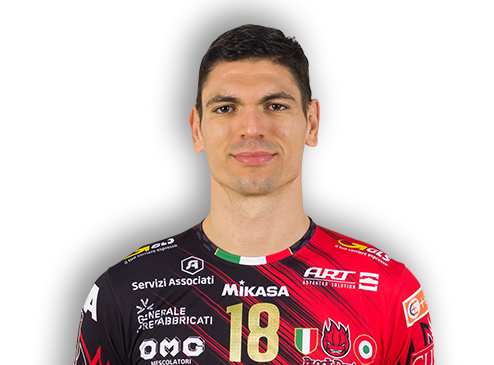

Personal information
- Nationality: Serbia
- Born: 29 August 1987 (age 39); Novi Sad, SR Serbia, SFR Yugoslavia
- Height: 2.04 m (6 ft 8 in)
- Weight: 101 kg (223 lb)
- Spike: 358 cm (141 in)
- Block: 340 cm (134 in)

Volleyball information
- Position: Middle blocker
- Current club: (Italy) Itas Trentino
- Number: 18

Career
Years	Teams
2005–2007; 2007–2008; 2008–2016; 2016–2020; 2020–2024; 2024–	(Serbia) Vojvodina Novi Sad (Italy) Corigliano Volley (Italy) Volley Lube (Italy) Sir Safety Perugia (Italy) Trentino Volley (Italy) Volley Lube

National team
2006; 2006–2024	(Federal Republic of Yugoslavia) Serbia and Montenegro; Serbia
Honours
Men's volleyball
Representing Serbia
FIVB World Championship
Bronze medal – third place	2010 Italy
FIVB World League
Gold medal – first place	2016 Kraków
Silver medal – second place	2008 Rio de Janeiro
Silver medal – second place	2009 Belgrade
Silver medal – second place	2015 Rio de Janeiro
Bronze medal – third place	2010 Córdoba
CEV European Championship
Gold medal – first place	2011 Austria/Czech Republic
Gold medal – first place	2019 Belgium/France/Netherlands/Slovenia
Bronze medal – third place	2007 Russia
Bronze medal – third place	2013 Denmark/Poland
Bronze medal – third place	2017 Poland

Marko Podraščanin (Serbian: Марко Подрашчанин, born 29 August 1987) is a Serbian professional volleyball player, member of the Serbia men's national volleyball team and Italian club Itas Trentino, participant of the Olympic Games (Beijing 2008, London 2012 and Paris 2024), bronze medallist at the 2010 World Championship, 2011 European Champion, 2019 European Champion, gold medallist at the 2016 World League.

== Personal life ==
On May 25, 2014 married to Milena. On May 5, 2015 his wife gave birth to their daughter, Mila.

== Career ==
=== National team ===
On July 19, 2015, Podraščanin was part of the Serbian national team that made it to the final of the World League. Serbia finished silver medallists after losing 0–3 to France in the final.

== Sporting achievements ==
=== Clubs ===
- CEV Champions League
  - 2023/2024 – with Itas Trentino
  - 2016/2017 – with Sir Sicoma Colussi Perugia
  - 2020/2021 – with Itas Trentino
- FIVB Club World Championship
  - Brasil 2021 – with Itas Trentino
  - Brazil 2022 – with Trentino Itas
- CEV Challenge Cup
  - 2010/2011 – with Lube Banca Marche Macerata
- National championships
  - 2005/2006 Serbia and Montenegro Championship, with Vojvodina Novi Sad
  - 2006/2007 Serbian Championship, with Vojvodina Novi Sad
  - 2008/2009 Italian SuperCup, with Lube Banca Marche Macerata
  - 2008/2009 Italian Cup, with, with Lube Banca Marche Macerata
  - 2011/2012 Italian Championship, with Lube Banca Marche Macerata
  - 2012/2013 Italian SuperCup, with Cucine Lube Banca Marche Macerata
  - 2013/2014 Italian Championship, with Cucine Lube Banca Marche Macerata
  - 2014/2015 Italian SuperCup, with Cucine Lube Banca Marche Treia
  - 2017/2018 Italian SuperCup, with Sir Safety Conad Perugia
  - 2017/2018 Italian Cup, with Sir Safety Conad Perugia
  - 2017/2018 Italian Championship, with Sir Safety Conad Perugia
  - 2018/2019 Italian Cup, with Sir Safety Conad Perugia
  - 2019/2020 Italian SuperCup, with Sir Safety Conad Perugia
  - 2021/2022 Italian SuperCup, with Itas Trentino
  - 2022/2023 Italian Cup, with Itas Trentino
  - 2022/2023 Italian Championship, with Itas Trentino

=== Individual awards ===
- 2008: FIVB World League – Best Middle Blocker
- 2011: CEV European Championship – Best Middle Blocker
- 2015: Italian SuperCup – Most Valuable Player
- 2017: CEV Champions League – Best Middle Blocker
- 2018: CEV Champions League – Best Middle Blocker
- 2021: CEV European Championship – Best Middle Blocker
- 2022 FIVB Club World Championship – Best Middle Blocker

Awards
Preceded by (Brazil) Gustavo Endres	Best Blocker of FIVB World League; 2008	Succeeded by (Cuba) Robertlandy Simón
Preceded by (Bulgaria) Viktor Yosifov	Best Middle Blocker of CEV European Championship; 2011; 2021 ex aequo (Poland) Piotr Nowakowski	Succeeded by TBD
Preceded by (Argentina) Sebastian Sole (United States) Russell Holmes	Best Middle Blocker of CEV Champions League; 2016/2017 ex aequo (Russia) Artem Volvich; 2017/2018 ex aequo (Serbia) Dragan Stanković	Succeeded by Not awarded
