= James Shaw (volleyball) =

American volleyball player (born 1994)

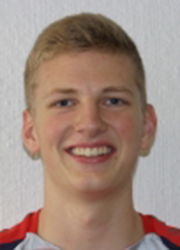

Personal information
- Born: March 5, 1994 (age 32); Stanford, California, U.S.
- Hometown: Woodside, California, U.S.
- Height: 6 ft 8 in (204 cm)
- Weight: 218 lb (99 kg)
- Spike: 141 in (358 cm)
- Block: 133 in (338 cm)
- Education: Stanford University

Volleyball information
- Position: Setter
- Current club: WWK Volleys Herrsching
- Number: 10 (national team), 8 (Stanford), 3 (Pro club)

Career
Years	Teams
2012-2016; 2016-2017; 2017-2018; 2018-2019; 2019-2020; 2020-2021; 2022-	(United States) Stanford University (Italy) Pallavolo Padova (Italy) Sir Safety Perugia (Poland) Zaksa (France) Narbonne Volley (Italy) Gas Sales Piacenza (Germany) WWK Volleys Herrsching

National team
2014-	United States
Medal record
Men's beach volleyball
Representing the United States
World Cup
Bronze medal – third place	2019 Japan	Beach
World Tour
Bronze medal – third place	2025 Playa del Carmen	Beach
Pan-American Cup
Bronze medal – third place	2022 Gatineau	Beach

James Shaw (born March 5, 1994) is an American volleyball player. Shaw currently plays for WWK Volleys Herrsching. He is part of the United States men's national volleyball team. On club level he played for Stanford University. Shaw started his professional career in the 2016/2017 season where he played for Italian Club, Pallavolo Padova. In May 2017, it was announced that he would spend the upcoming 2017/2018 season at Sir Safety Perugia. He spent his 2022 summer training with Team USA and traveled to Brazil for the first round of VNL. Since 2023, Shaw has shifted his focus on Beach Volleyball. He has partnered with Chaim Shalk and the duo played the 2024-2025 season together. The pair qualified for the 2025 AVP League, representing the Miami Mayhem, and finishing 6th in the Men's standings.

== Personal life ==
James Shaw was born in Stanford, California and grew up in Woodside, California. He attended St. Francis High School. He later attended Stanford University, where he graduated from in 2016 with a major in science, technology, and society. His parents are Don Shaw and Carolyn Walker. His father acted as head coach of men's and women's volleyball at Stanford for 27 years. He has one older sister named Jordan who also played volleyball at St. Mary's College.
