= Russell Holmes (volleyball) =

American volleyball player

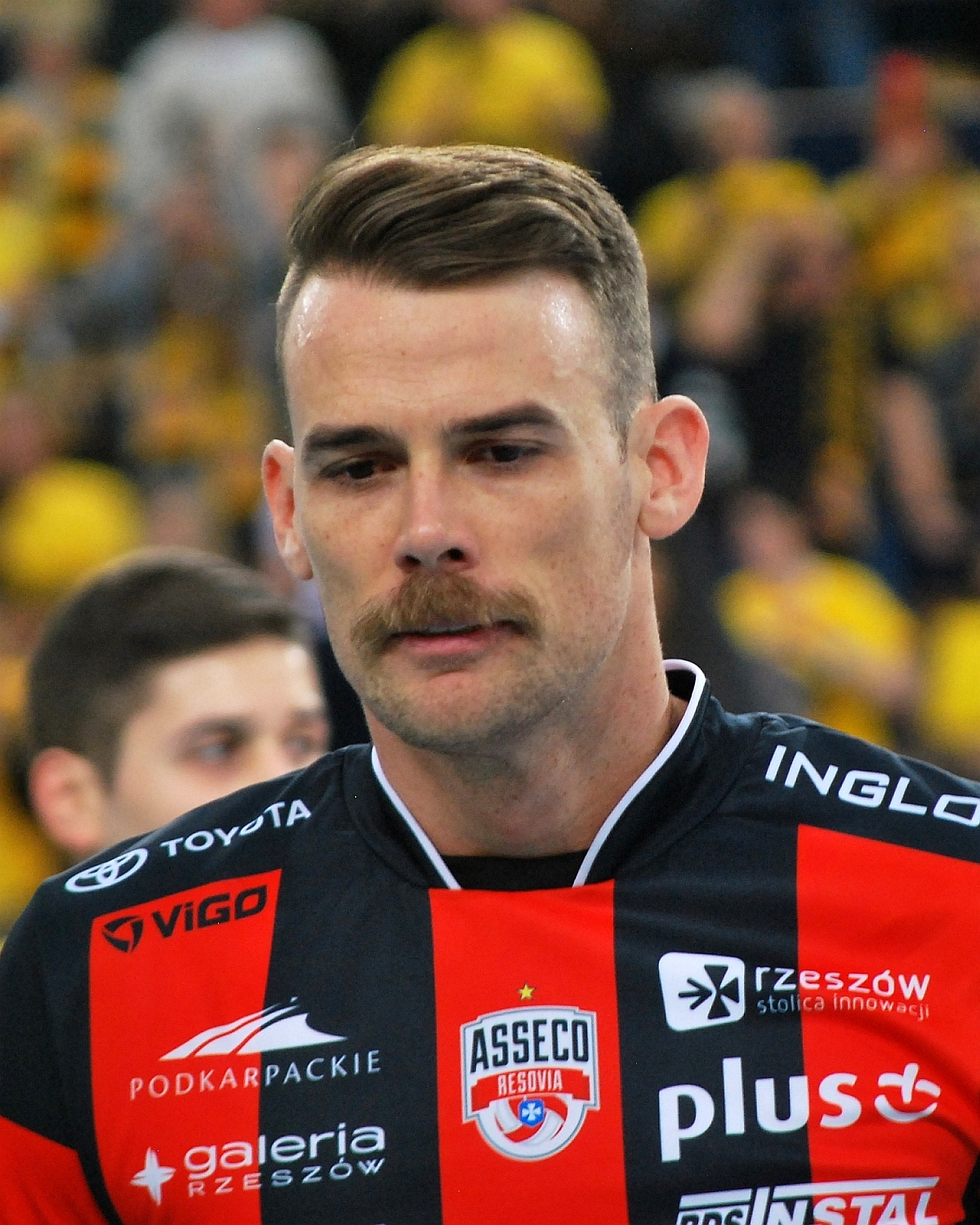

Personal information
- Full name: Russell Kenneth Holmes
- Nationality: American
- Born: July 1, 1982 (age 44); Anaheim, California, U.S.
- Hometown: Fountain Valley, California, U.S.
- Height: 6 ft 9 in (2.05 m)
- Education: Brigham Young University

Volleyball information
- Position: Middle blocker

Career
Years	Teams
2004–2008; 2008–2010; 2010–2011; 2011–2013; 2013–2014; 2014–2016; 2017	BYU Cougars; Hypo Tirol Innsbruck; Minas Tênis Clube; Jastrzębski Węgiel; İstanbul BBSK; Asseco Resovia; Paris Volley

National team
2009–2015	United States
Medal record
Men's volleyball
Representing United States
FIVB World Cup
Gold medal – first place	2015 Japan
FIVB World League
Gold medal – first place	2014 Florence
Silver medal – second place	2012 Sofia
Bronze medal – third place	2015 Rio de Janeiro

Russell Kenneth Holmes (born July 1, 1982) is an American former professional volleyball player. He was part of the U.S. national team, and a participant at the Olympic Games London 2012. The 2014 World League and the 2015 World Cup winner.

== Personal life ==
Holmes was born in Anaheim, California, United States. His parents are Mark and Tamara Holmes. He has an older sister Leah and a younger brother Dane.

After graduating from Fountain Valley High School in 2001, he served a mission for the Church of Jesus Christ of Latter-day Saints in London, England. He graduated from Brigham Young University in 2008 with a degree in sociology.

He is married to Krystal, and has two daughters and son – Sadie Rae (born in June 2007 – from his first marriage), Shea Golden (born on April 27, 2015) and Liam Russell (born on August 10, 2017).

== Career ==
=== Clubs ===
In 2008–2010, he played overseas for Austria's Hypo Tirol Innsbruck in the Middle European Volleyball Zone Association (MEVZA), winning the MEVZA Cup in 2009 and the Austrian Cup in 2009 and 2010.

During the winter of 2010–2011, Russell played for Minas Tênis Clube in Brazilian Volleyball League. During 2011–13, he played for Poland's Jastrzębski Węgiel in the PlusLiga and then for Turkey's İstanbul BBSK during the 2013–2014 season in the Turkish Volleyball League. While playing in Istanbul, BBSK reached the Final Four of the CEV Challenge Cup.

In 2014 he returned to PlusLiga, this time playing for Asseco Resovia Rzeszów. In April 2015 he achieved title of Polish Champion with club from Rzeszów.

=== National team ===
Holmes made his Olympic debut with the U.S. national team at Olympic Games 2012 in London, Great Britain.

== Honors ==
=== Clubs ===
- CEV Champions League
  - 2014/2015 – with Asseco Resovia
- FIVB Club World Championship
  - Doha 2011 – with Jastrzębski Węgiel
- National championships
  - 2008/2009 Austrian Cup, with Hypo Tirol Innsbruck
  - 2008/2009 Austrian Championship, with Hypo Tirol Innsbruck
  - 2009/2010 Austrian Cup, with Hypo Tirol Innsbruck
  - 2009/2010 Austrian Championship, with Hypo Tirol Innsbruck
  - 2014/2015 Polish Championship, with Asseco Resovia

=== Individual awards ===
- 2011: FIVB Club World Championship – Best Middle Blocker
- 2016: CEV Champions League – Best Middle Blocker

Awards
Preceded by (Poland) Piotr Nowakowski (Netherlands) Rob Bontje	Best Middle Blocker of CEV Champions League; 2015/2016 ex aequo (Argentina) Sebastián Solé	Succeeded by (Serbia) Marko Podraščanin (Russia) Artem Volvich
