= Mihajlo Mitić =

Serbian volleyball player (born 1990)

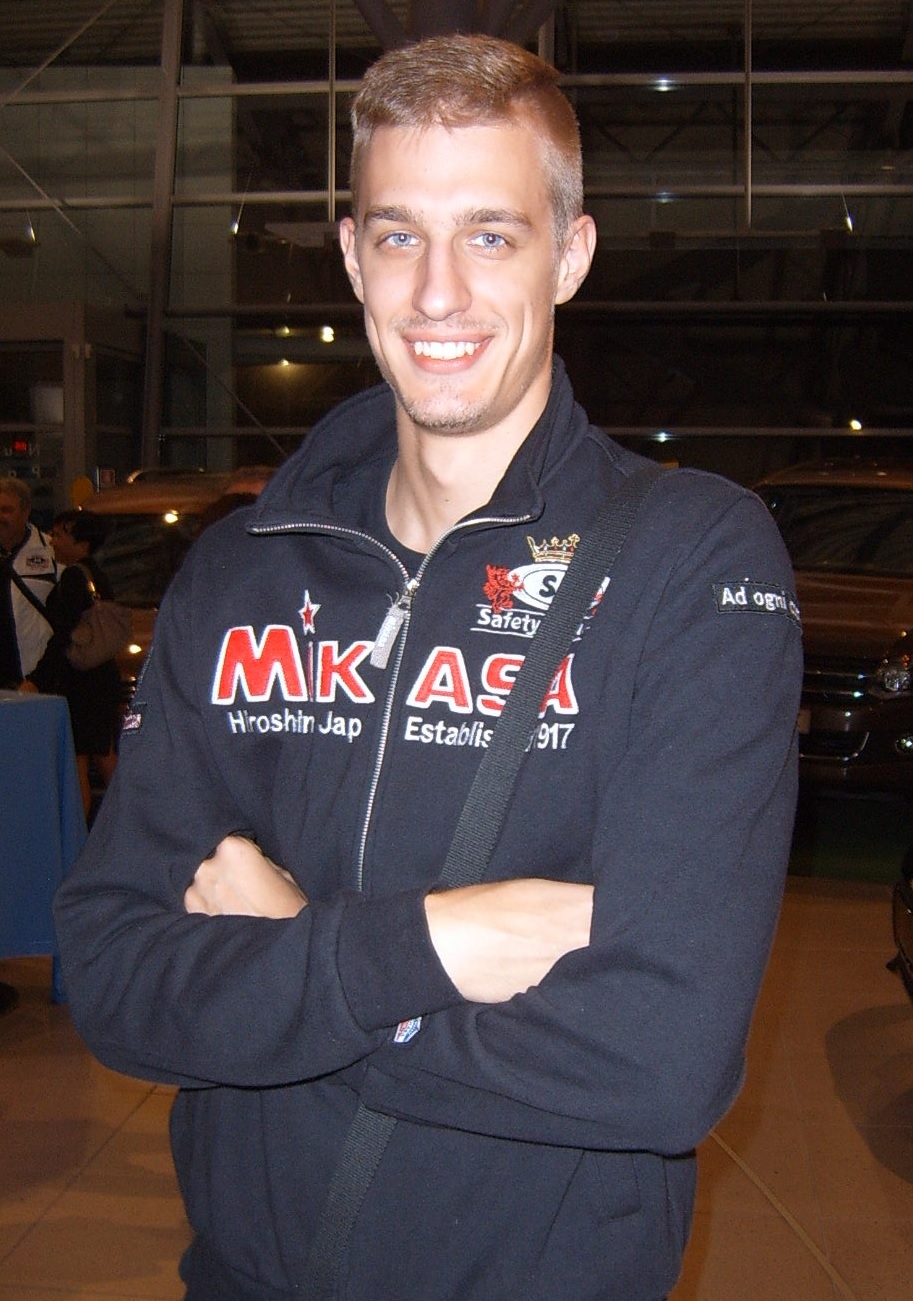

Personal information
- Nationality: Serbian
- Born: 17 September 1990 (age 36); Veliko Gradište, SR Serbia, SFR Yugoslavia
- Height: 2.01 m (6 ft 7 in)
- Weight: 93 kg (205 lb)
- Spike: 345 cm (136 in)
- Block: 320 cm (126 in)

Volleyball information
- Position: Setter

Career
| Years | Teams |
|---|---|
| 2008–2013; 2013–2014; 2014–2015; 2015–2016; 2016–2017; 2017–2018; 2018; 2018–2019; 2019–2020; 2020–2023 | OK Crvena Zvezda; Sir Safety Perugia; Chaumont VB 52; Al Zahra; Sir Safety Perugia; Gazprom-Ugra Surgut; APOEL Nicosia; SpeedBall Chekka; Black Volley Beskydy; Skra Bełchatów |

National team
| 2010– | Serbia |
Honours
Men's volleyball
Representing Serbia
FIVB World League
| Bronze medal – third place | 2010 Cordoba |
CEV European Championship
| Gold medal – first place | 2011 Austria/Czech Republic |

Mihajlo Mitić (Serbian Cyrillic: Михајло Митић; born 17 September 1990) is a Serbian professional volleyball player. He is a former member of the Serbia national team and the 2011 European Champion.

His father, Miodrag Mitić, was a volleyball player and member of the Yugoslavia men's national volleyball team.

== Honours ==
=== Club ===
- CEV Champions League
  - 2016–17 – with Sir Sicoma Colussi Perugia
- Domestic
  - 2008–09 Serbian Cup, with OK Crvena Zvezda
  - 2010–11 Serbian Cup, with OK Crvena Zvezda
  - 2011–12 Serbian SuperCup, with OK Crvena Zvezda
  - 2011–12 Serbian Championship, with OK Crvena Zvezda
  - 2012–13 Serbian SuperCup, with OK Crvena Zvezda
  - 2012–13 Serbian Cup, with OK Crvena Zvezda
  - 2012–13 Serbian Championship, with OK Crvena Zvezda
  - 2015–16 Lebanese Championship, with Al Zahra
  - 2018–19 Lebanese Championship, with SpeedBall Chekka
