= David Sossenheimer =

German volleyball player (born 1996)

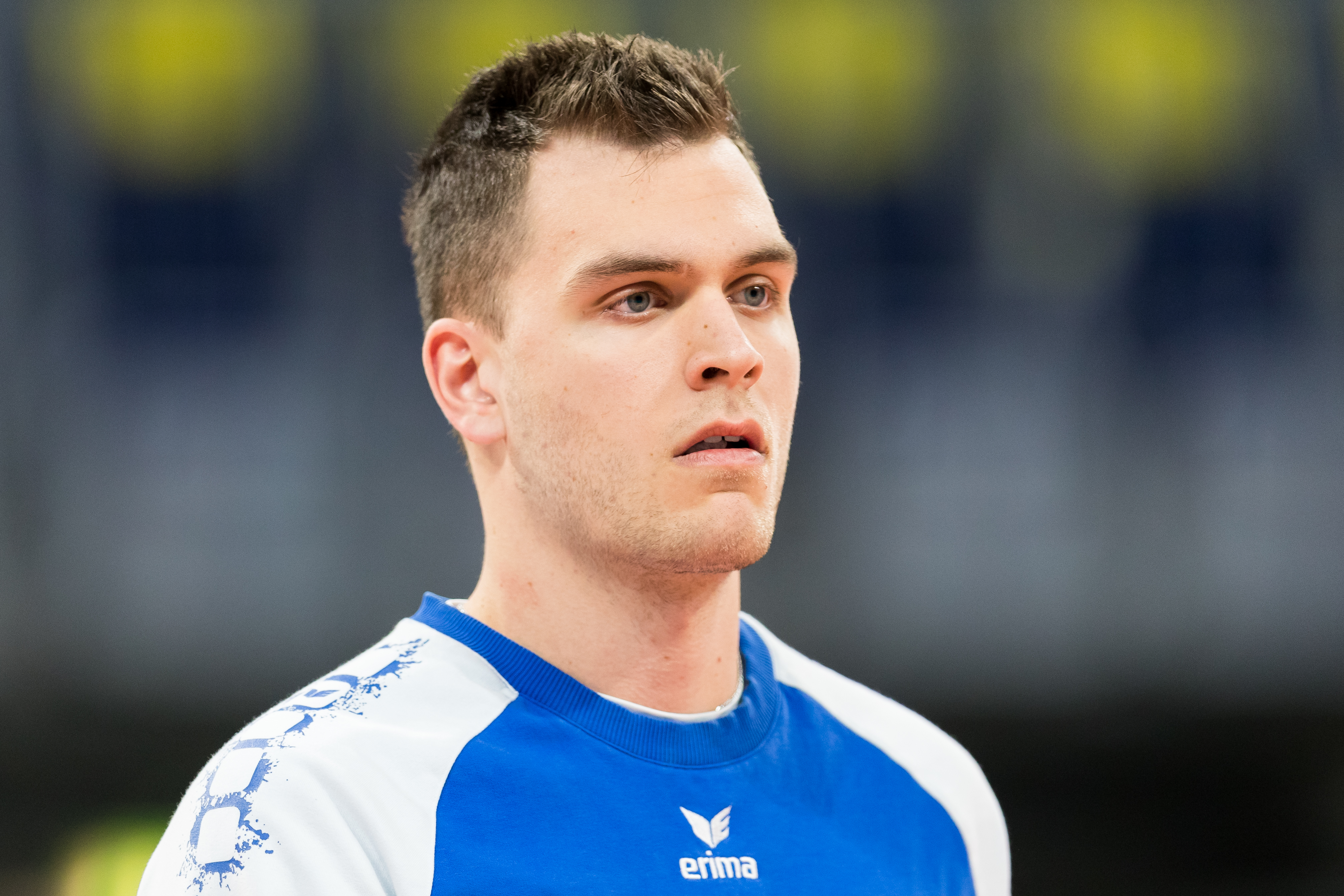

Personal information
- Nationality: German
- Born: 21 June 1996 (age 30); Erlenbach am Main, Germany
- Height: 1.93 m (6 ft 4 in)
- Weight: 90 kg (198 lb)

Volleyball information
- Position: Outside hitter
- Current club: Arago de Sète
- Number: 5

Career
Years	Teams
2013–2014; 2014–2016; 2016–2019; 2019–2020; 2020–2021; 2021–2022; 2022–	Generali Unterhaching; TV Bühl; VfB Friedrichshafen; MKS Będzin; Sir Safety Perugia; AS Cannes; Arago de Sète

National team
Germany

David Sossenheimer (born 21 June 1996) is a German professional volleyball player. He is a member of the Germany national team. At the professional club level, he plays for Arago de Sète.

== Honours ==
=== Clubs ===
- National championships
  - 2016/2017 German SuperCup, with VfB Friedrichshafen
  - 2016/2017 German Cup, with VfB Friedrichshafen
  - 2016/2017 German Championship, with VfB Friedrichshafen
  - 2017/2018 German SuperCup, with VfB Friedrichshafen
  - 2017/2018 German Cup, with VfB Friedrichshafen
  - 2017/2018 German Championship, with VfB Friedrichshafen
  - 2018/2019 German SuperCup, with VfB Friedrichshafen
  - 2018/2019 German Cup, with VfB Friedrichshafen
  - 2018/2019 German Championship, with VfB Friedrichshafen
  - 2020/2021 Italian SuperCup, with Sir Safety Perugia
  - 2020/2021 Italian Championship, with Sir Safety Perugia

=== Individual awards ===
- 2017: German SuperCup – Best Opposite
- 2018: German SuperCup – Most Valuable Player
