= Roberto Russo (volleyball) =

Italian volleyball player (born 1997)

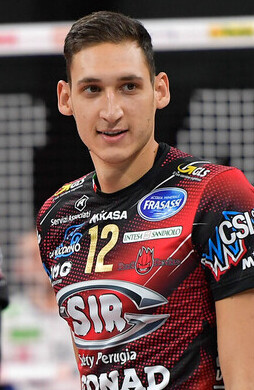
- Russo in 2021

Personal information
- Nationality: Italy
- Born: February 27, 1997 (age 29)
- Hometown: Palermo, Italy
- Height: 207 cm (6 ft 9 in)
- Weight: 91 kg (201 lb)
- Spike: 340 cm (134 in)
- Block: 320 cm (126 in)

Volleyball information
- Position: Middle blocker
- Current club: Modena Volley
- Number: 19

Career
Years	Teams
2015–2018	Club Italia Roma
2018–2019	Consar Ravenna
2019–2026	Sir Safety Umbria Volley
2026–	Modena Volley
Honours
FIVB World Championship
Gold medal – first place	2022 Poland/Slovenia
Gold medal – first place	2025 Philippines
European Championship
Silver medal – second place	2023 Italy/Bulgaria/North Macedonia/Israel

Roberto Russo (born 27 February 1997) is an Italian professional volleyball player who plays as a middle blocker for Lega Pallavolo Serie A club Modena Volley and the Italy national team.

== Personal life ==
Russo wanted to become a football player. His uncle was a volleyball player who introduced him into volleyball.

== Career ==
Russo signed his first club in 2014.

=== Club ===
- Club Italia Roma
- Consar Ravenna
- Sir Safety Umbria Volley

=== National team ===
In 2015, he was called up for the U19 national team and in 2016 to the U21 and U23 national teams.

In 2018, he was called up to the senior national team, with which he won, in the same year, the gold medal at the 2018 Mediterranean Games.

== Honours ==
=== Clubs ===
- CEV Champions League
  - 2024–25, with Sir Sicoma Monini Perugia
- FIVB Club World Championship
  - 2022, with Sir Safety Susa Perugia
  - 2023, with Sir Sicoma Perugia
  - 2025, with Sir Sicoma Perugia
- Domestic
  - 2019–20 Italian SuperCup, with Sir Safety Perugia
  - 2019–20 Italian Championship, with Sir Susa Perugia
  - 2020–21 Italian SuperCup, with Sir Safety Perugia
  - 2020–21 Italian Championship, with Sir Safety Perugia
  - 2021–22 Italian Cup, with Sir Safety Perugia
  - 2021–22 Italian Championship, with Sir Safety Perugia
  - 2022–23 Italian Super Cup, with Sir Safety Perugia
  - 2023–24 Italian Super Cup, with Sir Susa Perugia
  - 2023–24 Italian Cup, with Sir Susa Perugia
  - 2023–24 Italian Championship, with Sir Susa Perugia
  - 2024–25 Italian Super Cup, with Sir Susa Perugia
  - 2024–25 Italian Championship, with Sir Susa Perugia

=== National team ===
- FIVB Volleyball Men's World Championship
  - 2022 – Gold medal
- Men's European Volleyball Championship
  - 2023 – Silver medal
- Mediterranean Games
  - 2018 – Gold medal

=== Individual awards ===
2019–20 SuperLega – Best U23 Player
