= Simone Buti =

Italian volleyball player (born 1983)

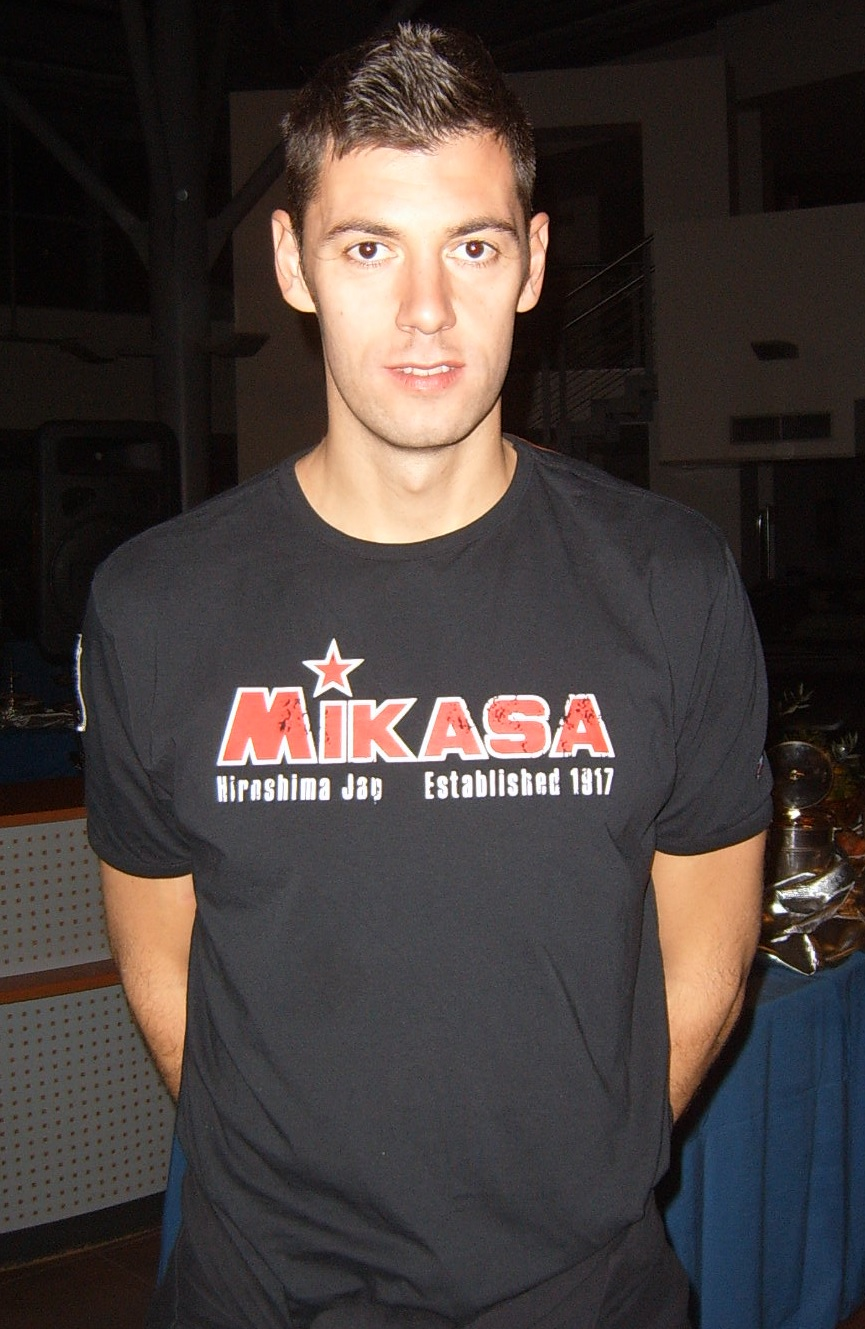

Personal information
- Born: 19 September 1983 (age 43); Fucecchio, Italy
- Height: 2.08 m (6 ft 10 in)
- Weight: 98 kg (216 lb)
- Spike: 346 cm (136 in)
- Block: 328 cm (129 in)

Volleyball information
- Position: Middle blocker
- Current club: Gi Group Monza
- Number: 1

Career
Years	Teams
2003–2005; 2005–2006; 2006–2007; 2007–2009; 2009–2010; 2010–2011; 2011–2012; 2012–2014; 2014–2017; 2017–	Tomei Livorno; AdriaVolley Trieste; Top Team Mantova; Gabeca Montichiari; BluVolley Verona; Pineto Volley; Gabeca Monza; Tonno Callipo Vibo Valentia; Sir Sicoma Colussi Perugia; Gi Group Monza

National team
2010–	Italy
Honours
Men's volleyball
Representing Italy
Olympic Games
Olympic Games
Silver medal – second place	2016 Rio de Janeiro	Team
World Cup
Silver medal – second place	2015 Japan
World League
Bronze medal – third place	2014 Florence
European Championship
Silver medal – second place	2011 Austria/Czech Republic
Bronze medal – third place	2015 Bulgaria/Italy

Simone Buti (born 19 September 1983) is an Italian volleyball player, a member of the Italy men's national volleyball team and Gi Group Monza, silver medalist of the 2015 World Cup, medalist of the European Championship (silver in 2011, bronze in 2015), medalist of the World League.

== Sporting achievements ==
=== CEV Champions League ===
- 2016/2017 - with Sir Sicoma Colussi Perugia

=== National team ===
- 2011 CEV European Championship
- 2014 FIVB World League
- 2015 FIVB World Cup
- 2015 CEV European Championship
- 2016 Olympic Games
