= 2022 FIVB Volleyball Men's Club World Championship =

International volleyball men's club competition

2022 Men's Club World Championship
Tournament details
- Host country: Brazil
- City: Betim
- Dates: 7–11 December
- Teams: 6 (from 3 confederations)
- Venue: 1 (in 1 host city)

Final positions
- Champions: (Italy) Sir Safety Susa Perugia (1st title)

Tournament awards
- MVP: (Italy) Simone Giannelli
- Best Setter: (Italy) Simone Giannelli
- Best OH: (Italy) Alessandro Michieletto (Poland) Wilfredo León
- Best MB: (Serbia) Marko Podraščanin (Brazil) Flávio Gualberto
- Best OPP: (Bulgaria) Matey Kaziyski
- Best Libero: (Brazil) Lucas De Deus

Tournament statistics
- Matches played: 10
- Attendance: 22,756 (2,276 per match)

The 2022 FIVB Volleyball Men's Club World Championship was the 17th edition of the competition. It was held in Betim, Brazil. It was the seventh time as well as the third consecutive times Betim was selected as the host city. The tournament was held from 7 to 11 December 2022. It was Volei Renata's first appearance at the Club World Championship.

Sir Safety Susa Perugia won their title for the first time on their first participation of the tournament. Simone Giannelli was chosen as MVP of this tournament.

== Host selection ==
On 10 June 2022, Brazilian media reported that this edition of the men's club world championship would be hosted in Minas Gerais, Brazil. According to the report, Brazil is going to host both men's and women's club world championship.

On 13 September 2022, it was reported that the Italian club Perugia had offered to host the next edition of the men's club world championship. In the end, Betim was selected to be the host city.

== Qualification ==
| Team (Confederation) | Qualified as |
|---|---|
| (Brazil) Sada Cruzeiro Vôlei (CSV) | Hosts |
| (Poland) ~~ZAKSA Kędzierzyn-Koźle~~ (CEV) | 2022 European champions |
| (Italy) Trentino Itas (CEV) | 2022 European runners-up |
| (Brazil) Itambé Minas (CSV) | 2022 South American runners-up |
| (Iran) Paykan Club (AVC) | 2022 Asian champions |
| (Brazil) Vôlei Renata (CSV) | 2022 South American 3rd place |
| (Italy) Sir Safety Susa Perugia (CEV) | Wild card |

Notes:

1.ZAKSA Kędzierzyn-Koźle withdrew from the tournament again and were replaced by Sir Safety Susa Perugia.
2.Sada Cruzeiro Vôlei was granted the hosts spot. Therefore, Vôlei Renata, the third placed team from the 2022 CSV Club Championship qualified as the next eligible team through the continental club championship qualification pathway, in accordance with the FIVB event regulations.

== Venue ==
All matches
Betim, Brazil
Ginásio Poliesportivo Divino Braga
Capacity: 6,000
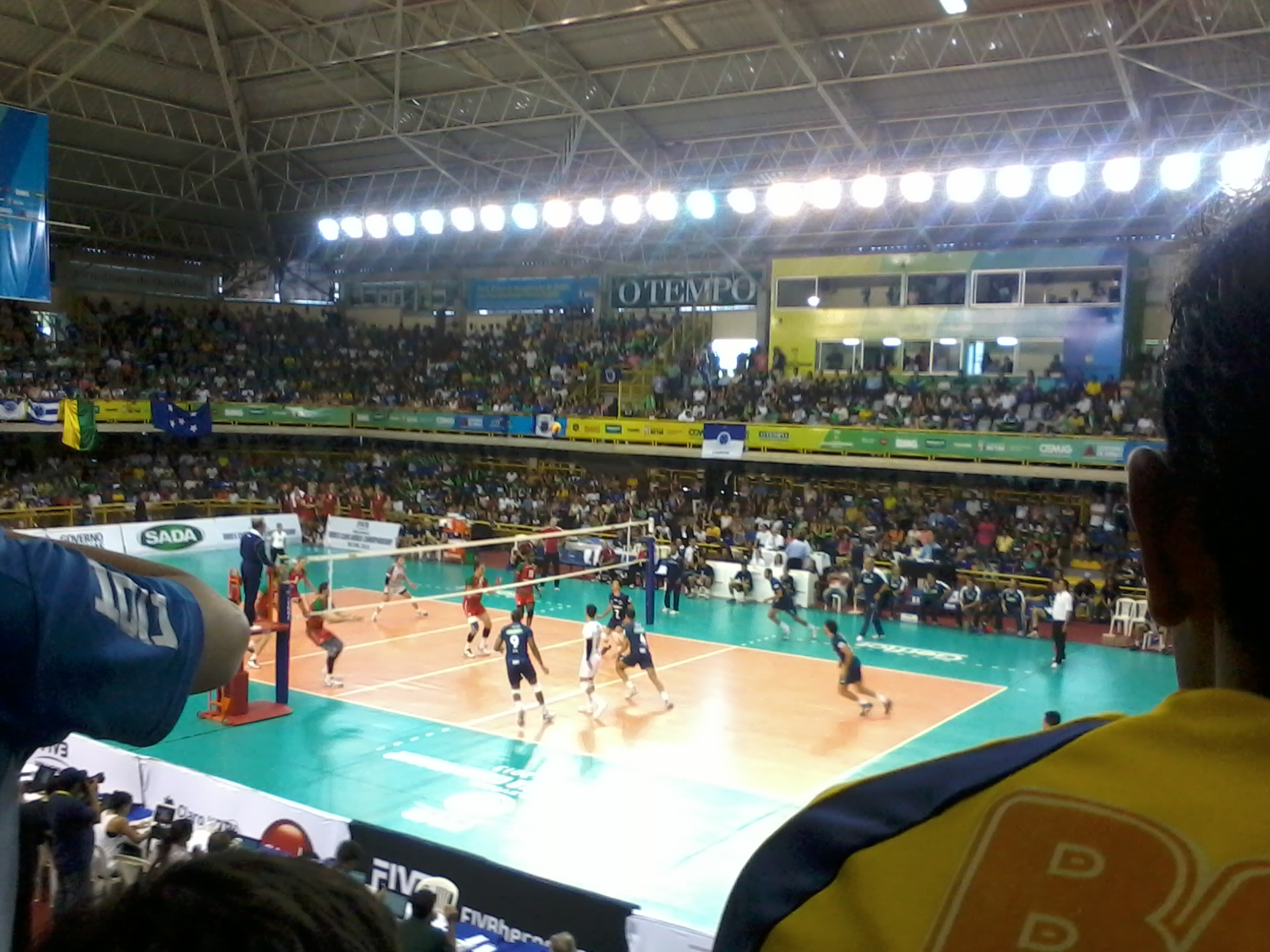

== Format ==
=== Preliminary round ===
Six teams divided into two pools of three teams each in a round-robin match. The top two teams of each pool advance to the semifinals.

=== Final round ===
A knockout stage. The first ranked team of Pool A plays a semifinal match against the second ranked team of Pool B, and the first ranked team of Pool B plays a semifinal match against the second ranked team of Pool A. The winners of the semifinals play for the Club World Championship title, while the runners-up play for the third place in the competition.

== Pools composition ==
| Pool A | Pool B |
|---|---|
| (Brazil) Sada Cruzeiro Vôlei | (Brazil) Itambé Minas |
| (Brazil) Vôlei Renata | (Iran) Paykan Club |
| (Italy) Sir Safety Susa Perugia | (Italy) Trentino Itas |

== Pool standing procedure ==
1. Number of victories
2. Match points
3. Sets quotient
4. Points quotient
5. Result of the last match between the tied teams

Match won 3–0 or 3–1: 3 match points for the winner, 0 match points for the loser
Match won 3–2: 2 match points for the winner, 1 match point for the loser

== Preliminary round ==
- All times are Brasília Time (UTC−03:00).

=== Pool A ===
| Pos | Team | Pld | W | L | Pts | SW | SL | SR | SPW | SPL | SPR | Qualification |
|---|---|---|---|---|---|---|---|---|---|---|---|---|
| 1 | (Italy) Sir Safety Susa Perugia | 2 | 2 | 0 | 6 | 6 | 1 | 6.000 | 179 | 153 | 1.170 | Semifinals |
| 2 | (Brazil) Sada Cruzeiro Vôlei | 2 | 1 | 1 | 3 | 4 | 3 | 1.333 | 169 | 139 | 1.216 | Semifinals |
| 3 | (Brazil) Vôlei Renata | 2 | 0 | 2 | 0 | 0 | 6 | 0.000 | 123 | 150 | 0.820 | |

| Date | Time | | Score | | Set 1 | Set 2 | Set 3 | Set 4 | Set 5 | Total | Report |
|---|---|---|---|---|---|---|---|---|---|---|---|
| 7 Dec | 21:00 | Sada Cruzeiro Vôlei (Brazil) | 3–0 | (Brazil) Vôlei Renata | 25–20 | 25–22 | 25–22 | | | 75–64 | P2 Report |
| 8 Dec | 21:00 | Vôlei Renata (Brazil) | 0–3 | (Italy) Sir Safety Susa Perugia | 22–25 | 16–25 | 21–25 | | | 59–75 | P2 Report |
| 9 Dec | 21:15 | Sada Cruzeiro Vôlei (Brazil) | 1–3 | (Italy) Sir Safety Susa Perugia | 21–25 | 21–25 | 31–29 | 21–25 | | 94–104 | P2 Report |

=== Pool B ===
| Pos | Team | Pld | W | L | Pts | SW | SL | SR | SPW | SPL | SPR | Qualification |
|---|---|---|---|---|---|---|---|---|---|---|---|---|
| 1 | (Italy) Trentino Itas | 2 | 2 | 0 | 6 | 6 | 1 | 6.000 | 175 | 149 | 1.174 | Semifinals |
| 2 | (Brazil) Itambé Minas | 2 | 1 | 1 | 3 | 3 | 4 | 0.750 | 163 | 168 | 0.970 | Semifinals |
| 3 | (Iran) Paykan Club | 2 | 0 | 2 | 0 | 2 | 6 | 0.333 | 180 | 201 | 0.896 | |

| Date | Time | | Score | | Set 1 | Set 2 | Set 3 | Set 4 | Set 5 | Total | Report |
|---|---|---|---|---|---|---|---|---|---|---|---|
| 7 Dec | 18:00 | Itambé Minas (Brazil) | 3–1 | (Iran) Paykan Club | 22–25 | 27–25 | 27–25 | 25–18 | | 101–93 | P2 Report |
| 8 Dec | 18:00 | Trentino Itas (Italy) | 3–1 | (Iran) Paykan Club | 25–20 | 25–21 | 25–27 | 25–19 | | 100–87 | P2 Report |
| 9 Dec | 18:15 | Itambé Minas (Brazil) | 0–3 | (Italy) Trentino Itas | 21–25 | 23–25 | 18–25 | | | 62–75 | P2 Report |

== Final round ==
- All times are Brasília Time (UTC−03:00).

Semifinals
10 December
(Italy) Sir Safety Susa Perugia | 3
(Brazil) Itambé Minas | 0
10 December
(Italy) Trentino Itas | 3
(Brazil) Sada Cruzeiro Vôlei | 0

Final
11 December
(Italy) Sir Safety Susa Perugia | 3
(Italy) Trentino Itas | 1
3rd place match
11 December
(Brazil) Itambé Minas | 1
(Brazil) Sada Cruzeiro Vôlei | 3

=== Semifinals ===
| Date | Time | | Score | | Set 1 | Set 2 | Set 3 | Set 4 | Set 5 | Total | Report |
|---|---|---|---|---|---|---|---|---|---|---|---|
| 10 Dec | 18:30 | Trentino Itas (Italy) | 3–0 | (Brazil) Sada Cruzeiro Vôlei | 25–13 | 25–22 | 25–17 | | | 75–52 | P2 Report |
| 10 Dec | 21:30 | Sir Safety Susa Perugia (Italy) | 3–0 | (Brazil) Itambé Minas | 25–19 | 25–19 | 25–17 | | | 75–55 | P2 Report |

=== 3rd place match ===
| Date | Time | | Score | | Set 1 | Set 2 | Set 3 | Set 4 | Set 5 | Total | Report |
|---|---|---|---|---|---|---|---|---|---|---|---|
| 11 Dec | 13:00 | Itambé Minas (Brazil) | 1–3 | (Brazil) Sada Cruzeiro Vôlei | 31–29 | 24–26 | 21–25 | 19–25 | | 95–105 | P2 Report |

=== Final ===
| Date | Time | | Score | | Set 1 | Set 2 | Set 3 | Set 4 | Set 5 | Total | Report |
|---|---|---|---|---|---|---|---|---|---|---|---|
| 11 Dec | 16:00 | Sir Safety Susa Perugia (Italy) | 3–1 | (Italy) Trentino Itas | 20–25 | 25–23 | 27–25 | 25–19 | | 97–92 | P2 Report |

== Final standings ==
| Rank | Team |
|---|---|
| 1st place, gold medalist(s) | (Italy) Sir Safety Susa Perugia |
| 2nd place, silver medalist(s) | (Italy) Trentino Itas |
| 3rd place, bronze medalist(s) | (Brazil) Sada Cruzeiro Vôlei |
| 4 | (Brazil) Itambé Minas |
| 5 | (Iran) Paykan Club |
| 6 | (Brazil) Vôlei Renata |

2022 Club World Champions

1st title

Team
Simone Giannelli, Jesús Herrera, Kamil Rychlicki, Wilfredo León (c), Alessandro Piccinelli, Sebastián Solé, Roberto Russo, Massimo Colaci, Flávio Gualberto, Kamil Semeniuk, Oleh Plotnytskyi, Gregor Ropret, Julio César Cardenas, Stefano Mengozzi
Coach
(Italy) Andrea Anastasi

== Awards ==
- Most valuable player
  (Italy) Simone Giannelli (Sir Safety Susa Perugia)
- Best setter
  (Italy) Simone Giannelli (Sir Safety Susa Perugia)
- Best outside spikers
  (Italy) Alessandro Michieletto (Trentino Itas)
  (Poland) Wilfredo León (Sir Safety Susa Perugia)
- Best middle blockers
  (Serbia) Marko Podraščanin (Trentino Itas)
  (Brazil) Flávio Gualberto (Sir Safety Susa Perugia)
- Best opposite spiker
  (Bulgaria) Matey Kaziyski (Trentino Itas)
- Best libero
  (Brazil) Lucas de Deus (Sada Cruzeiro Vôlei)

== See also ==
- 2022 FIVB Volleyball Women's Club World Championship
