= Gregor Ropret =

Slovenian volleyball player (born 1989)

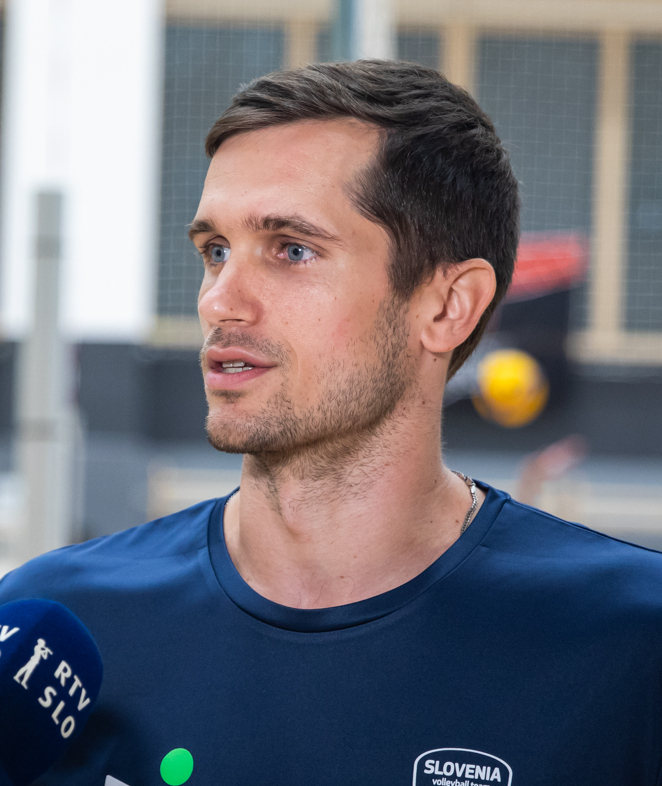
- Ropret in 2022

Personal information
- Born: 1 March 1989 (age 37); Ljubljana, Yugoslavia
- Height: 1.92 m (6 ft 4 in)
- Weight: 89 kg (196 lb)
- Spike: 340 cm (134 in)
- Block: 322 cm (127 in)

Volleyball information
- Position: Setter
- Current club: ACH Volley

Career
Years	Teams
2008–2011; 2011–2014; 2014–2016; 2016; 2016–2017; 2017–2018; 2018–2020; 2020–2021; 2021–2022; 2022–2024; 2024–2025; 2025–	Calcit Kamnik; ACH Volley; Hypo Tirol Innsbruck; Exprivia Molfetta; Afyon Belediye Yüntaş; VK ČEZ Karlovarsko; Nantes Rezé Métropole; ACH Volley; Cambrai Volley; Sir Safety Perugia; Asseco Resovia; ACH Volley

National team
2008–	Slovenia
Medal record
Men's volleyball
Representing Slovenia
European Championship
Silver medal – second place	2015 Bulgaria/Italy
Silver medal – second place	2019 France/Slovenia/Belgium/Netherlands
Silver medal – second place	2021 Poland/Czech Republic/Estonia/Finland
Bronze medal – third place	2023 Italy/Bulgaria/North Macedonia/Israel
European League
Gold medal – first place	2015 Poland
Mediterranean Games
Bronze medal – third place	2009 Pescara	Team

Gregor Ropret (born 1 March 1989) is a Slovenian volleyball player who plays for ACH Volley and the Slovenia national team. With Slovenia, he was the runner-up of the European Volleyball Championship three times, in 2015, 2019 and 2021.

== Career ==
In August 2015, Ropret won the gold medal with Slovenia in the 2015 European League. With Slovenia, he was also the runner-up of the 2015 European Championship, where the team lost 3–0 against France in the final.

He represented Slovenia at the 2024 Summer Olympics.

== Honours ==
=== Club ===
National championships

- 2011–12 Slovenian Championship, with ACH Volley
- 2012–13 Slovenian Championship, with ACH Volley
- 2013–14 Slovenian Championship, with ACH Volley

FIVB Club World Championship

- Brazil 2022 – with Sir Safety Perugia
- India 2023 – with Sir Safety Perugia

=== National team ===
- 2015 (gold) Men's European Volleyball League
- 2015 (silver) Men's European Volleyball Championship
- 2019 (silver) Men's European Volleyball Championship
- 2021 (silver) Men's European Volleyball Championship
- 2023 (bronze) Men's European Volleyball Championship

=== Individual awards ===
- 2021: CEV European Championship – Best Setter
