= Stefano Mengozzi =

Italian volleyball player (born 1985)

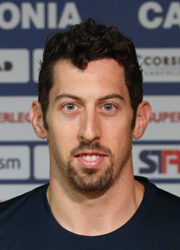

Personal information
- Nationality: Italian
- Born: 6 May 1985 (age 41)
- Height: 202 cm (6 ft 8 in)
- Weight: 88 kg (194 lb)
- Spike: 333 cm (131 in)
- Block: 318 cm (125 in)

Volleyball information
- Number: 1 (national team)

Career
| Years | Teams |
|---|---|
| 2015 | Robur Porto |

National team
| 2015 | Italy |

Stefano Mengozzi (born 6 May 1985) is an Italian male volleyball player. He is part of the Italy men's national volleyball team. On club level he plays for Robur Porto.

== Sporting achievements ==
=== Clubs ===
==== FIVB Club World Championship ====
- Brazil 2022 – with Sir Safety Susa Perugia

==== National championships ====
- 2022/2023 Italian Super Cup, with Sir Safety Susa Perugia
