= Umbria Volley Perugia =

Italian volleyball club

- Full name: Sir Safety Umbria Volley Perugia
- Short name: Perugia
- Nickname: Block Devils
- Founded: 2001
- Ground: PalaBarton; Perugia (Capacity: 5,500)
- Chairman: Gino Sirci
- Manager: Angelo Lorenzetti
- Captain: Simone Giannelli
- League: Italian Volleyball League
- Website: Club home page

Uniforms
Home	Away

Sir Safety Perugia, known as Sir Susa Scai Perugia due to sponsorship from Sir Safety System, is a professional Italian volleyball club based in Perugia. It plays in the highest level of the Italian Volleyball League. In the Italian Volleyball League, the team is known as Sir Susa Scai Perugia, while in the international competitions the official name is Sir Sicoma Monini Perugia. They laureated world champions three times in the history, including last time at 2025 FIVB Volleyball Men's Club World Championship.

== Achievements ==
- FIVB Volleyball Club World Championship
  (×3) 2022, 2023, 2025
- CEV Champions League
  (×2) 2025, 2026
  (×1) 2017
  (×5) 2018, 2019, 2021, 2022, 2023
- Italian Championship
  (×3) 2018, 2024, 2026
  (×5) 2014, 2016, 2019, 2021, 2022
- Italian Cup (Coppa Italia)
  (×4) 2018, 2019, 2022, 2024
  (×3) 2014, 2020, 2021
- Italian Super Cup (Supercoppa Italiana)
  (×8) 2017, 2019, 2020, 2022, 2023, 2024, 2025, 2026
  (×1) 2016

== Team ==
Team roster – season 2026/2027

No.	Name	Date of birth	Position
6	(Italy) Simone Giannelli (C)	9 August 1996	setter
9	(Italy) Stefano Cappadona	10 February 2005	setter
7	(Belgium) Ferre Reggers	18 July 2003	opposite
12	(Czech Republic) David Kollator	15 January 2003	opposite
4	(France) Mathis Henno	25 February 2005	outside hitter
16	(Poland) Kamil Semeniuk	16 July 1996	outside hitter
17	(Ukraine) Oleh Plotnytskyi	5 June 1997	outside hitter
21	(Iran) Seyed Matin Hosseini	26 September 2005	outside hitter
8	(Argentina) Agustín Loser	12 October 1997	middle blocker
11	(Argentina) Sebastián Solé	12 June 1991	middle blocker
19	(Italy) Giovanni Sanguinetti	14 April 2000	middle blocker
22	(Italy) Federico Crosato	22 May 2002	middle blocker
10	(Italy) Luca Loreti	24 December 2005	libero
20	(Italy) Marco Gaggini	7 April 2002	libero
Head coach: (Italy) Angelo Lorenzetti

Team roster – season 2025/2026

No.	Name	Date of birth	Position
6	(Italy) Simone Giannelli (C)	9 August 1996	setter
2	(Italy) Bryan Argilagos	26 January 2007	setter
5	(Croatia) Gabrijel Cvanciger	1 August 2003	opposite
10	(Tunisia) Wassim Ben Tara	3 August 1996	opposite
4	(Czech Republic) Donovan Dzavoronok	23 July 1997	outside hitter
14	(Japan) Yūki Ishikawa	11 December 1995	outside hitter
16	(Poland) Kamil Semeniuk	16 July 1996	outside hitter
17	(Ukraine) Oleh Plotnytskyi	5 June 1997	outside hitter
8	(Argentina) Agustín Loser	12 October 1997	middle blocker
11	(Argentina) Sebastián Solé	12 June 1991	middle blocker
19	(Italy) Roberto Russo	23 February 1997	middle blocker
22	(Italy) Federico Crosato	22 May 2002	middle blocker
20	(Italy) Marco Gaggini	7 April 2002	libero
13	(Italy) Massimo Colaci	21 February 1985	libero
Head coach: (Italy) Angelo Lorenzetti

Team roster – season 2024/2025

No.	Name	Date of birth	Position
3	(Italy) Francesco Zoppellari	27 May 1997	setter
6	(Italy) Simone Giannelli (C)	9 August 1996	setter
7	(Cuba) Jesús Herrera	4 April 1995	opposite
10	(Tunisia) Wassim Ben Tara	3 August 1996	opposite
5	(Italy) Nicola Cianciotta	8 April 2001	outside hitter
14	(Japan) Yūki Ishikawa	11 December 1995	outside hitter
16	(Poland) Kamil Semeniuk	16 July 1996	outside hitter
17	(Ukraine) Oleh Plotnytskyi	5 June 1997	outside hitter
2	(Italy) Davide Candellaro	7 June 1989	middle-blocker
8	(Argentina) Agustín Loser	12 October 1997	middle-blocker
11	(Argentina) Sebastián Solé	12 June 1991	middle-blocker
19	(Italy) Roberto Russo	23 February 1997	middle-blocker
1	(Italy) Alessandro Piccinelli	30 January 1997	libero
13	(Italy) Massimo Colaci	21 February 1985	libero
Head coach: (Italy) Angelo Lorenzetti

Team roster – season 2023/2024

Team roster – season 2023/2024
2	(Italy) Davide Candellaro	7 June 1989	middle blocker
3	(Italy) Tim Held	17 April 1998	outside hitter
6	(Italy) Simone Giannelli	9 August 1996	setter
7	(Cuba) Jesús Herrera	4 April 1995	opposite
8	(Italy) Alessandro Toscani	18 July 1998	libero
9	(Poland) Wilfredo León (C)	31 July 1993	outside hitter
10	(Tunisia) Wassim Ben Tara	3 August 1996	opposite
11	(Argentina) Sebastián Solé	12 June 1991	middle blocker
12	(Italy) Roberto Russo	23 February 1997	middle blocker
13	(Italy) Massimo Colaci	21 February 1985	libero
15	(Brazil) Flávio Gualberto	22 April 1993	middle blocker
16	(Poland) Kamil Semeniuk	16 July 1996	outside hitter
17	(Ukraine) Oleh Plotnytskyi	5 June 1997	outside hitter
20	(Slovenia) Gregor Ropret	1 March 1989	setter
Head coach: (Italy) Angelo Lorenzetti; Assistant: (Italy) Massimiliano Giaccardi

Team roster – season 2022/2023
No.	Name	Date of birth	Position				
6	(Italy) Simone Giannelli	9 August 1996	setter				
7	(Cuba) Jesús Herrera	4 April 1995	opposite				
8	(Luxembourg) Kamil Rychlicki	1 November 1996	opposite				
9	(Poland) Wilfredo León (C)	31 July 1993	outside hitter				
10	(Italy) Alessandro Piccinelli	30 January 1997	libero				
11	(Argentina) Sebastián Solé	12 June 1991	middle blocker				
12	(Italy) Roberto Russo	23 February 1997	middle blocker				
13	(Italy) Massimo Colaci	21 February 1985	libero	14	(Japan) Yūki Ishikawa	11 December 1995	outside hitter
15	(Brazil) Flávio Gualberto	22 April 1993	middle blocker				
16	(Poland) Kamil Semeniuk	16 July 1996	outside hitter				
17	(Ukraine) Oleh Plotnytskyi	5 June 1997	outside hitter				
20	(Slovenia) Gregor Ropret	1 March 1989	setter				
21	(Cuba) Julio César Cardenas	4 September 2000	outside hitter				
23	(Italy) Stefano Mengozzi	6 May 1985	middle blocker				
Head coach: (Italy) Andrea Anastasi; Assistant: (Italy) Antonio Valentini

Team roster – season 2021/2022
No.	Name	Date of birth	Position
1	(United States) Matt Anderson	April 18, 1987	outside hitter
2	(Italy) Fabio Ricci	July 11, 1994	middle blocker
3	(Latvia) Kristers Dardzans	September 10, 2001	outside hitter
4	(Italy) Dragan Travica	August 28, 1986	setter
5	(Netherlands) Thijs ter Horst	September 18, 1991	outside hitter
6	(Italy) Simone Giannelli	August 9, 1996	setter
8	(Luxembourg) Kamil Rychlicki	November 1, 1996	opposite
9	(Poland) Wilfredo León (C)	July 31, 1993	outside hitter
10	(Italy) Alessandro Piccinelli	January 30, 1997	libero
11	(Argentina) Sebastián Solé	June 12, 1991	middle blocker
12	(Italy) Roberto Russo	February 23, 1997	middle blocker
13	(Italy) Massimo Colaci	February 21, 1985	libero
17	(Ukraine) Oleh Plotnytskyi	June 5, 1997	outside hitter
23	(Italy) Stefano Mengozzi	May 6, 1985	middle blocker
Head coach: (Serbia) Nikola Grbić; Assistant: (Italy) Carmine Fontana

Team roster – season 2020/2021
Sir Safety Conad Perugia
No.	Name	Date of birth	Position
1	(Italy) Alessandro Piccinelli	January 30, 1997	libero
2	(Italy) Fabio Ricci	July 11, 1994	middle blocker
3	(Canada) Sharone Vernon-Evans	August 28, 1998	opposite
4	(Italy) Dragan Travica	August 28, 1986	setter
5	(Netherlands) Thijs ter Horst	September 18, 1991	outside hitter
7	(Germany) David Sossenheimer	June 21, 1996	outside hitter
8	(Italy) Omar Biglino	August 9, 1995	middle blocker
9	(Poland) Wilfredo León	July 31, 1993	outside hitter
10	(Germany) Jan Zimmermann	February 12, 1993	setter
11	(Argentina) Sebastián Solé	June 12, 1991	middle blocker
12	(Italy) Roberto Russo	February 23, 1997	middle blocker
13	(Italy) Massimo Colaci	February 21, 1985	libero
14	(Serbia) Aleksandar Atanasijević (C)	September 4, 1991	opposite
15	(Poland) Maciej Muzaj	May 21, 1994	opposite
17	(Ukraine) Oleh Plotnytskyi	June 5, 1997	outside hitter
Head coach: (Belgium) Vital Heynen; Assistant: (Italy) Carmine Fontana

Team roster – season 2019/2020
Sir Safety Conad Perugia
No.	Name	Date of birth	Position
1	(Italy) Alessandro Piccinelli	January 30, 1997	libero
2	(Italy) Fabio Ricci	July 11, 1994	middle blocker
4	(Netherlands) Sjoerd Hoogendoorn	February 17, 1991	opposite
5	(United States) James Shaw	March 5, 1994	setter
6	(Estonia) Robert Täht	August 15, 1993	outside hitter
8	(United States) Aaron Russell	June 4, 1993	outside hitter
9	(Poland) Wilfredo León Venero	July 31, 1993	outside hitter
10	(Italy) Filippo Lanza	March 3, 1991	outside hitter
11	(Finland) Tommi Siirilä	August 5, 1993	middle blocker
12	(Italy) Roberto Russo	February 23, 1997	middle blocker
13	(Italy) Massimo Colaci	February 21, 1985	libero
14	(Serbia) Aleksandar Atanasijević (C)	September 4, 1991	opposite
15	(Argentina) Luciano De Cecco	June 2, 1988	setter
16	(Croatia) Leo Andric	July 20, 1994	outside hitter
17	(Italy) Simone Anzani	February 24, 1992	middle blocker
18	(Serbia) Marko Podraščanin	August 29, 1987	middle blocker
Head coach: (Belgium) Vital Heynen; Assistant: (Italy) Carmine Fontana

Team roster – season 2017/2018
Sir Safety Conad Perugia
No.	Name	Date of birth	Position
2	(Italy) Fabio Ricci	July 11, 1994	middle blocker
4	(Italy) Andrea Cesarini	July 22, 1987	libero
5	(United States) James Shaw	March 5, 1994	setter
8	(United States) Aaron Russell	June 4, 1993	outside hitter
9	(Italy) Ivan Zaytsev	October 2, 1988	outside hitter
10	(Italy) Dore Della Lunga	July 25, 1984	outside hitter
11	(Finland) Tommi Siirilä	August 5, 1993	middle blocker
12	(Costa Rica) Alexander Chamberlain	January 29, 2003	outside hitter
13	(Italy) Massimo Colaci	February 21, 1985	libero
14	(Serbia) Aleksandar Atanasijević	September 4, 1991	opposite
15	(Argentina) Luciano De Cecco	June 2, 1988	setter
16	(Croatia) Leo Andric	July 20, 1994	outside hitter
17	(Italy) Simone Anzani	February 24, 1992	middle blocker
18	(Serbia) Marko Podraščanin	August 29, 1987	middle blocker
Head coach: (Italy) Lorenzo Bernardi; Assistant: (Italy) Carmine Fontana

Team roster – season 2016/2017
Sir Sicoma Colussi Perugia
No.	Name	Date of birth	Position
1	(Italy) Simone Buti	September 19, 1983	middle blocker
3	(Italy) Federico Tosi	September 18, 1991	libero
6	(Bulgaria) Velizar Chernokozhev	April 23, 1995	outside hitter
7	(Italy) Alessandro Franceschini	June 21, 1983	middle blocker
8	(United States) Aaron Russell	June 4, 1993	outside hitter
9	(Italy) Ivan Zaytsev	October 2, 1988	outside hitter
10	(Italy) Dore Della Lunga	July 25, 1984	outside hitter
11	(Serbia) Mihajlo Mitić	September 19, 1990	setter
12	(Austria) Alexander Berger	September 27, 1988	outside hitter
14	(Serbia) Aleksandar Atanasijević	September 4, 1991	opposite
15	(Argentina) Luciano De Cecco	June 2, 1988	setter
16	(Italy) Andrea Bari	March 5, 1980	libero
17	(Italy) Emanuele Birarelli	January 8, 1981	middle blocker
18	(Serbia) Marko Podraščanin	August 29, 1987	middle blocker
Head coach: (Italy) Lorenzo Bernardi; Assistant: (Italy) Carmine Fontana

Team roster – season 2015/2016
Sir Safety Conad Perugia
No.	Name	Date of birth	Position
1	(Italy) Simone Buti	September 19, 1983	middle blocker
2	(Germany) Christian Fromm	August 15, 1990	outside hitter
3	(United States) Samuel Holt	June 20, 1993	outside hitter
5	(Argentina) Luciano De Cecco	June 2, 1988	setter
6	(Germany) Denis Kaliberda	August 24, 1990	outside hitter
7	(Italy) Andrea Giovi	August 19, 1983	libero
8	(United States) Aaron Russell	June 4, 1993	outside hitter
9	(Bulgaria) Dobromir Dimitrov	July 7, 1991	setter
10	(Greece) Georgios Tzioumakas	January 23, 1995	opposite
11	(Italy) Alberto Elia	August 12, 1985	middle blocker
12	(Italy) Alessandro Franceschini	June 21, 1983	middle blocker
14	(Serbia) Aleksandar Atanasijević	September 4, 1991	opposite
15	(Italy) Fabio Fanuli	February 10, 1985	libero
18	(Italy) Emanuele Birarelli	January 8, 1981	middle blocker
Head coach: (Argentina) Daniel Castellani (2015–Dec 2015) / (Serbia) Slobodan Kovač (Dec 2015–2016) (Italy) Assistant: Carmine Fontana

== Notable players ==
- 2004–2006 (Cuba) Osvaldo Hernández
- 2011–2015 (Montenegro) Goran Vujević
- 2012–2013 (Australia) Thomas Edgar
- 2013–2014 (Serbia) Mihajlo Mitić
- 2014–2016 (Germany) Christian Fromm
- 2015–2016 (Germany) Denis Kaliberda
- 2013–2017 (Italy) Simone Buti
- 2015–2018 (United States) Aaron Russell
- 2016–2017 (Italy) Andrea Bari
- 2016–2018 (Italy) Ivan Zaytsev
- 2013–2021 (Serbia) Aleksandar Atanasijević
- 2014–2020 (Argentina) Luciano De Cecco
- 2016–2019 (Austria) Alexander Berger
- 2016–2020 (Serbia) Marko Podraščanin
- 2018–2024 (Poland) Wilfredo Leon
- 2020–2022 (Italy) Dragan Travica
- 2020–2022 (Netherlands) Thijs ter Horst
- 2021–2022 (United States) Matt Anderson
- 2019–present (Ukraine) Oleh Plotnytskyi
- 2020–present (Argentina) Sebastián Solé
- 2021–present (Italy) Simone Giannelli
- 2022-present (Poland) Kamil Semeniuk
- 2023-present (Tunisia) Wassim Ben Tara
- 2024–present (Japan) Yūki Ishikawa
- 2024–present (Argentina) Agustín Loser
