= Oleh Plotnytskyi =

Ukrainian volleyball player (born 1997)

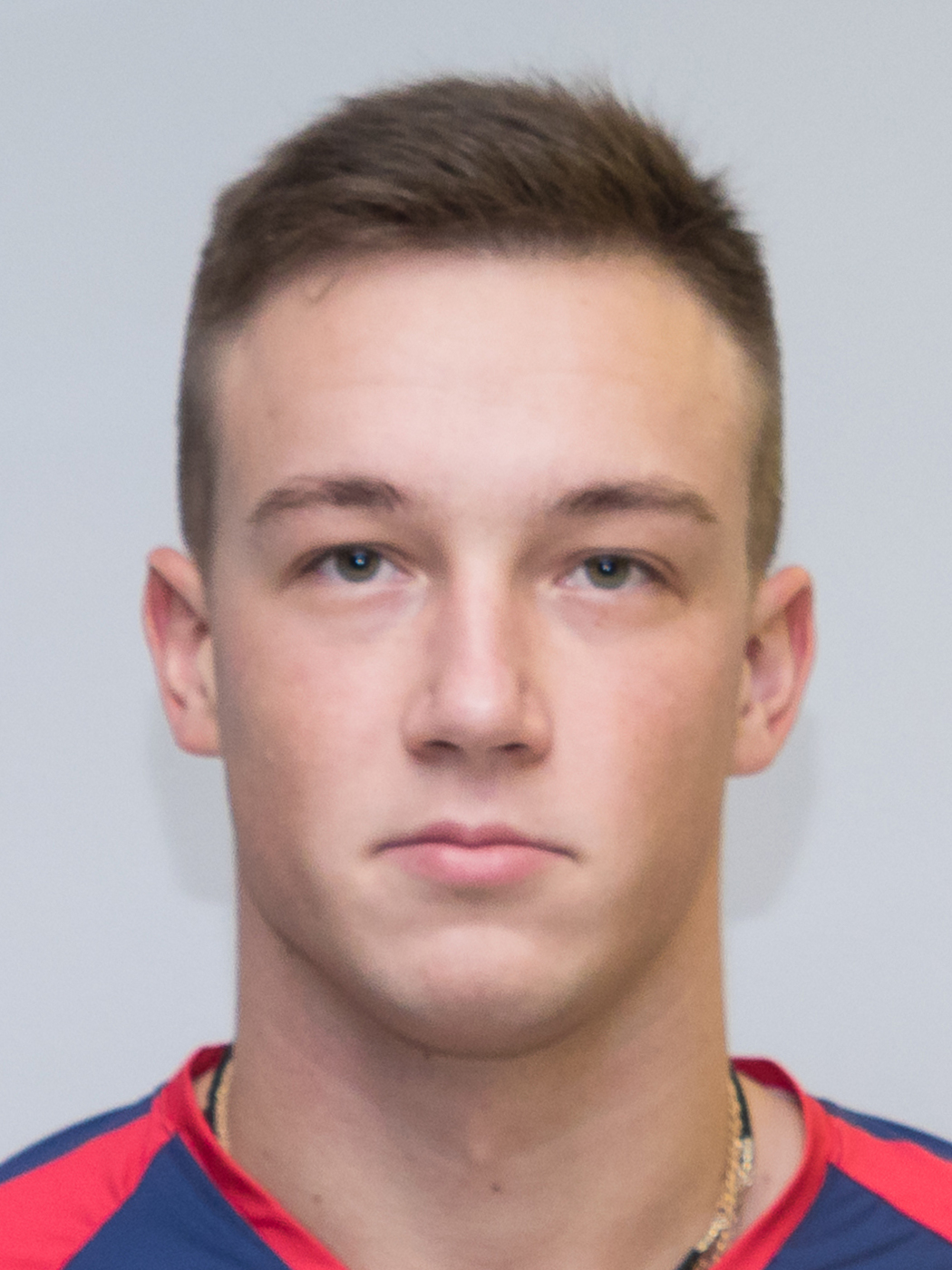
- Plotnytskyi in 2019

Personal information
- Full name: Oleh Yuriiovych Plotnytskyi
- Born: 5 June 1997 (age 29); Vinnytsia Oblast, Ukraine
- Height: 1.95 m (6 ft 5 in)
- Weight: 95 kg (209 lb)
- Spike: 345 cm (136 in)
- Block: 320 cm (126 in)

Volleyball information
- Position: Outside hitter
- Current club: Sir Safety Perugia
- Number: 17

Career
| Years | Teams |
|---|---|
| 2015–2017; 2017–2019; 2019– | Lokomotiv Kharkiv; Vero Volley Monza; Sir Safety Perugia |

National team
| 2017– | Ukraine |
Honours
Men's volleyball
Representing Ukraine
European League
| Silver medal – second place | 2021 Belgium |
| Silver medal – second place | 2023 Croatia |
FIVB Challenger Cup
| Bronze medal – third place | 2023 Qatar |
European U20 Championships
| Silver medal – second place | 2016 Bulgaria |
Men's beach volleyball
Representing Ukraine
World U19 Championships
| Silver medal – second place | 2014 Porto | Beach |
European U20 Championships
| Bronze medal – third place | 2015 Larnaca | Beach |

Oleh Yuriiovych Plotnytskyi, (Ukrainian: Олег Юрійович Плотницький; born 5 June 1997) is a Ukrainian professional volleyball player who plays as an outside hitter for Lega Pallavolo Serie A club Sir Safety Perugia and the Ukraine national team.

== Honours ==
=== Clubs ===
- CEV Champions League
  - 2024–25, with Sir Sicoma Monini Perugia
  - 2025–26, with Sir Sicoma Monini Perugia
- FIVB Club World Championship
  - 2022, with Sir Safety Susa Perugia
  - 2023, with Sir Sicoma Perugia
  - 2025, with Sir Sicoma Perugia
- Domestic
  - 2015–16 Ukrainian Cup, with Lokomotiv Kharkiv
  - 2015–16 Ukrainian Championship, with Lokomotiv Kharkiv
  - 2016–17 Ukrainian Championship, with Lokomotiv Kharkiv
  - 2019–20 Italian SuperCup, with Sir Safety Perugia
  - 2019–20 Italian Championship, with Sir Susa Perugia
  - 2020–21 Italian SuperCup, with Sir Safety Perugia
  - 2020–21 Italian Championship, with Sir Safety Perugia
  - 2021–22 Italian Cup, with Sir Safety Perugia
  - 2021–22 Italian Championship, with Sir Safety Perugia
  - 2022–23 Italian Super Cup, with Sir Safety Perugia
  - 2023–24 Italian Super Cup, with Sir Susa Perugia
  - 2023–24 Italian Cup, with Sir Susa Perugia
  - 2023–24 Italian Championship, with Sir Susa Perugia
  - 2024–25 Italian Super Cup, with Sir Susa Perugia
  - 2024–25 Italian Championship, with Sir Susa Perugia

=== Youth national team ===
- 2016 CEV U20 European Championship

=== Individual awards ===
- 2016: CEV U20 European Championship – Most valuable player
- 2016: CEV U20 European Championship – Best outside spiker
- 2022: Italian SuperCup – Most valuable player
- 2023: Italian Championship – Best receiver
- 2023 FIVB Club World Championship – Most valuable player
- 2023 FIVB Club World Championship – Best outside spiker
