= Flávio Gualberto =

Brazilian volleyball player (born 1993)

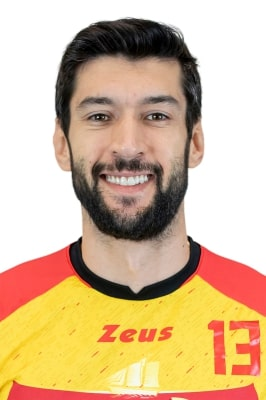
- Gualberto in 2021

Personal information
- Full name: Flávio César Resende Gualberto
- Born: 22 April 1993 (age 33); Pimenta, Minas Gerais, Brazil
- Height: 2.00 m (6 ft 7 in)
- Weight: 84 kg (185 lb)
- Spike: 356 cm (140 in)

Volleyball information
- Position: Middle blocker
- Current club: Trentino Volley

Career
| Years | Teams |
|---|---|
| 2012–2013; 2013–2019; 2019–2020; 2020–2021; 2021–2022; 2022–2024; 2024– | Olympico Club; Minas Tênis Clube; SESC RJ; Warta Zawiercie; Volley Callipo; Sir Safety Perugia; Trentino Volley |

National team
| 2015– | Brazil |
Honours
Men's volleyball
Representing Brazil
FIVB World Championship
| Bronze medal – third place | 2022 Poland/Slovenia |
FIVB World Cup
| Gold medal – first place | 2019 Japan |
FIVB Nations League
| Gold medal – first place | 2021 Rimini |
| Bronze medal – third place | 2025 Ningbo |
Pan American Games
| Silver medal – second place | 2015 Toronto |
Pan American Cup
| Gold medal – first place | 2015 Reno |
| Silver medal – second place | 2018 Córdoba |
CSV South American Championship
| Gold medal – first place | 2019 Chile |
| Gold medal – first place | 2021 Brasília |
| Silver medal – second place | 2023 Recife |

Flávio César Resende Gualberto (Note: This name uses Portuguese naming customs: the first or maternal family name is Resende and the second or paternal family name is Gualberto.) (born 22 April 1993) is a Brazilian professional volleyball player who plays as a middle blocker for Trentino Volley and the Brazil national team.

== Honours ==
=== Club ===
- FIVB Club World Championship
  - Betim 2022 – with Sir Safety Perugia
  - Bangalore 2023 – with Sir Safety Perugia
- CSV South American Club Championship
  - Belo Horizonte 2013 – with Minas Tênis Clube
- Domestic
  - 2022–23 Italian SuperCup, with Sir Safety Perugia
  - 2023–24 Italian SuperCup, with Sir Safety Perugia
  - 2023–24 Italian Cup, with Sir Safety Perugia
  - 2023–24 Italian Championship, with Sir Safety Perugia
  - 2024–25 Italian Championship, with Trentino Volley

=== Youth national team ===
- 2011 U19 Pan American Cup
- 2012 U23 Pan American Cup
- 2012 CSV U21 South American Championship
- 2013 FIVB U21 World Championship
- 2014 CSV U23 South American Championship

=== Individual awards ===
- 2010: CSV U19 South American Championship – Best blocker
- 2014: CSV U23 South American Championship – Best middle blocker
- 2015: Pan American Cup – Best blocker
- 2015: Pan American Cup – Best middle blocker
- 2018: Pan American Cup – Best middle blocker
- 2019: CSV South American Club Championship – Best middle blocker
- 2019: CSV South American Championship – Best middle blocker
- 2022: FIVB Club World Championship – Best middle blocker
