= Massimo Colaci =

Italian volleyball player (born 1985)

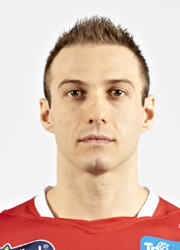
- Colaci playing for Trentino in 2013

Personal information
- Nationality: Italian
- Born: 21 February 1985 (age 41); Gagliano del Capo, Italy
- Height: 1.80 m (5 ft 11 in)
- Weight: 73 kg (161 lb)
- Spike: 310 cm (122 in)
- Block: 290 cm (114 in)

Volleyball information
- Position: Libero

Career
Years	Teams
2000–2007; 2007–2008; 2008–2010; 2010–2017; 2017–2026	Pallavolo Falchi Ugento; Volley Corigliano; Verona Volley; Trentino Volley; Umbria Volley Perugia

National team
2014–2021	Italy
Honours
Men’s Volleyball
Representing Italy
Olympic Games
Silver medal – second place	2016 Rio de Janeiro	Team
World Cup
Silver medal – second place	2015 Japan
World Grand Champions Cup
Silver medal – second place	2017 Japan
World League
Bronze medal – third place	2014 Florence
European Championship
Bronze medal – third place	2015 Bulgaria/Italy
- Last updated: 10 October 2026

Massimo Colaci (born 21 February 1985) is a former Italian volleyball player, silver medalist of the 2015 World Cup, bronze medalist of the 2015 European Championship and the 2014 World League. He also won the silver medal at the 2016 Summer Olympics.

== Honours ==
=== Clubs ===
==== FIVB Club World Championship ====
- 2016, with Trentino Diatec
- 2022, with Sir Safety Susa Perugia
- 2023, with Sir Sicoma Perugia
- 2025, with Sir Sicoma Perugia

==== CEV Champions League ====
- 2015–2016, with Trentino Diatec
- 2024–25, with Sir Sicoma Perugia

==== Italian Championship ====
- 2010–11, with Trentino Diatec
- 2012–13, with Trentino Diatec
- 2014–15, with Trentino Diatec
- 2017–18, with Sir Safety Susa Perugia
- 2023–24, with Sir Safety Susa Perugia

==== Italian Cup ====
- 2011–12, with Trentino Diatec
- 2012–13, with Trentino Diatec
- 2017–18, with Sir Safety Susa Perugia
- 2018–19, with Sir Safety Susa Perugia
- 2021–22, with Sir Safety Susa Perugia
- 2023–24, with Sir Safety Susa Perugia

==== Italian Super Cup ====
- 2011–12, with Trentino Diatec
- 2013–14, with Trentino Diatec
- 2017–18, with Sir Safety Susa Perugia
- 2019–20, with Sir Safety Susa Perugia
- 2020–21, with Sir Safety Susa Perugia
- 2022–23, with Sir Safety Susa Perugia
- 2023–24, with Sir Safety Susa Perugia
- 2024–25, with Sir Safety Susa Perugia

=== National team ===
- 2015 FIVB World Cup
- 2016 Olympic Games
