= 2020–21 CEV Champions League =

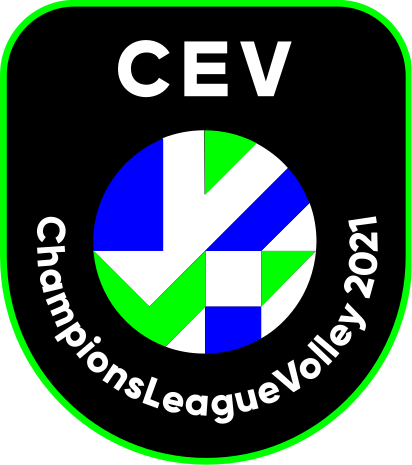
- League: CEV Champions League
- Sport: Volleyball
- Duration: Qualifying round: 22 September – 12 November 2020; Main tournament: 1 December 2020 – 1 May 2021
- Number of teams: 36 (18 qual. + 18 main tourn.)

Finals
- Venue: (Italy) Verona
- Champions: (Poland) ZAKSA Kędzierzyn-Koźle
- Finals MVP: (Poland) Aleksander Śliwka

CEV Champions League seasons
- ← 2019–20 2021–22 →

The 2020–21 CEV Champions League was the 62nd edition of the highest level European volleyball club competition organised by the European Volleyball Confederation.

== Qualification ==
Rank	Country	Number of teams			Qualified teams
Rank	Country	Vac	Qual	Total	Qualified teams
1	Italy	3	1	4	Cucine Lube Civitanova
1	Italy	3	1	4	Leo Shoes Modena
1	Italy	3	1	4	Sir Sicoma Monini Perugia
1	Italy	3	1	4	Itas Trentino
2	Russia	3	–	3	Lokomotiv Novosibirsk
2	Russia	3	–	3	Zenit Kazan
2	Russia	3	–	3	Kuzbass Kemerovo
3	Poland	3	1	4	ZAKSA Kędzierzyn-Koźle
3	Poland	3	1	4	Projekt Warsaw
3	Poland	3	1	4	PGE Skra Bełchatów
3	Poland	3	1	4	Jastrzębski Węgiel
4	Germany	2	–	2	Berlin Recycling Volleys
4	Germany	2	–	2	VfB Friedrichshafen
5	Turkey	2	–	2	Fenerbahçe HDI İstanbul
5	Turkey	2	–	2	Arkas İzmir
6	Belgium	2	–	2	Lindemans Aalst
6	Belgium	2	–	2	Knack Roeselare
7	France	1	–	1	Tours VB
8	Slovenia	1	–	1	ACH Volley Ljubljana
9	Czech Republic	1	–	1	ČEZ Karlovarsko

== Pools composition ==
Drawing of Lots was held on 21 August 2020 in Luxembourg City.

Pool A	Pool B	Pool C
ZAKSA Kędzierzyn-Koźle	Cucine Lube Civitanova	Zenit Kazan
Fenerbahçe HDI İstanbul	Arkas İzmir	Berlin Recycling Volleys
Lindemans Aalst	Tours VB	ACH Volley Ljubljana
PGE Skra Bełchatów	Sir Sicoma Monini Perugia	Jastrzębski Węgiel

Pool D	Pool E
Leo Shoes Modena	Lokomotiv Novosibirsk
Projekt Warsaw	VfB Friedrichshafen
Knack Roeselare	ČEZ Karlovarsko
Kuzbass Kemerovo	Itas Trentino

== League round ==
- 20 teams compete in the League round.
- The teams are split into 5 groups, each one featuring four teams.
- The top team in each pool and 3 best 2nd placed teams qualify for the quarterfinals.
- All times are local.

=== Pool standing procedure ===
1. Number of victories
2. Points
3. Set ratio
4. Setpoint ratio
5. H2H results

Result	Winners	Losers
3–0	3 points	0 points
3–1	3 points	0 points
3–2	2 points	1 point

=== Pool A ===
Pos	Team	Pld	W	L	Pts	SW	SL	SR	SPW	SPL	SPR	Qualification
1	(Poland) ZAKSA Kędzierzyn-Koźle	6	6	0	17	18	3	6.000	501	405	1.237	Quarterfinals
2	(Poland) PGE Skra Bełchatów	6	4	2	13	14	9	1.556	524	480	1.092	Quarterfinals
3	(Turkey) Fenerbahçe HDI İstanbul	6	2	4	5	8	14	0.571	458	499	0.918	
4	(Belgium) Lindemans Aalst	6	0	6	1	4	18	0.222	416	515	0.808	

Source: CEV

==== Tournament 1 ====
- Organizer: ZAKSA Kędzierzyn-Koźle

Date	Time		Score		Set 1	Set 2	Set 3	Set 4	Set 5	Total	Report
8 Dec	18:00	Lindemans Aalst (Belgium)	2–3	(Turkey) Fenerbahçe HDI İstanbul	25–20	22–25	21–25	25–17	9–15	102–102	Report
8 Dec	20:30	PGE Skra Bełchatów (Poland)	0–3	(Poland) ZAKSA Kędzierzyn-Koźle	21–25	19–25	19–25			59–75	Report
9 Dec	18:00	Lindemans Aalst (Belgium)	0–3	(Poland) PGE Skra Bełchatów	16–25	17–25	16–25			49–75	Report
9 Dec	20:30	Fenerbahçe HDI İstanbul (Turkey)	0–3	(Poland) ZAKSA Kędzierzyn-Koźle	21–25	20–25	13–25			54–75	Report
10 Dec	18:00	Fenerbahçe HDI İstanbul (Turkey)	1–3	(Poland) PGE Skra Bełchatów	18–25	21–25	25–23	21–25		85–98	Report
10 Dec	20:30	ZAKSA Kędzierzyn-Koźle (Poland)	3–0	(Belgium) Lindemans Aalst	25–19	25–19	25–17			75–55	Report

==== Tournament 2 ====
- Organizer: PGE Skra Bełchatów

Date	Time		Score		Set 1	Set 2	Set 3	Set 4	Set 5	Total	Report
26 Jan	18:00	Lindemans Aalst (Belgium)	0–3	(Turkey) Fenerbahçe HDI İstanbul	14–25	19–25	19–25			52–75	Report
26 Jan	20:30	PGE Skra Bełchatów (Poland)	2–3	(Poland) ZAKSA Kędzierzyn-Koźle	23–25	25–21	20–25	25–19	10–15	103–105	Report
27 Jan	18:00	Lindemans Aalst (Belgium)	1–3	(Poland) PGE Skra Bełchatów	25–17	20–25	18–25	20–25		83–92	Report
27 Jan	20:30	Fenerbahçe HDI İstanbul (Turkey)	0–3	(Poland) ZAKSA Kędzierzyn-Koźle	23–25	18–25	18–25			59–75	Report
28 Jan	18:00	Fenerbahçe HDI İstanbul (Turkey)	1–3	(Poland) PGE Skra Bełchatów	25–22	20–25	18–25	20–25		83–97	Report
28 Jan	20:30	ZAKSA Kędzierzyn-Koźle (Poland)	3–1	(Belgium) Lindemans Aalst	21–25	25–16	25–15	25–19		96–75	Report

=== Pool B ===
Pos	Team	Pld	W	L	Pts	SW	SL	SR	SPW	SPL	SPR
1	(Italy) Sir Sicoma Monini Perugia	6	5	1	15	16	4	4.000	483	295	1.637
2	(Italy) Cucine Lube Civitanova	6	5	1	15	15	5	3.000	479	313	1.530
3	(France) Tours VB	6	2	4	6	8	12	0.667	436	340	1.282
4	(Turkey) Arkas İzmir (Note: Arkas İzmir withdrew from both, the first tournament held in Tours, and from the second one held in Perugia due to coronavirus pandemic restrictions. Consequently, three remaining teams present at the tournaments claimed a 3–0 forfeit victory (25–0, 25–0, 25–0).)	6	0	6	0	0	18	0.000	0	450	0.000

Source: CEV

==== Tournament 1 ====
- Organizer: Tours VB

Date	Time		Score		Set 1	Set 2	Set 3	Set 4	Set 5	Total	Report
8 Dec	20:30	Cucine Lube Civitanova (Italy)	3–1	(Italy) Sir Sicoma Monini Perugia	25–22	22–25	25–20	25–23		97–90	Report
9 Dec	20:30	Tours VB (France)	0–3	(Italy) Cucine Lube Civitanova	21–25	23–25	23–25			67–75	Report
10 Dec	20:30	Sir Sicoma Monini Perugia (Italy)	3–0	(France) Tours VB	25–19	25–22	25–22			75–63	Report

==== Tournament 2 ====
- Organizer: Sir Sicoma Monini Perugia

Date	Time		Score		Set 1	Set 2	Set 3	Set 4	Set 5	Total	Report
9 Feb	20:30	Cucine Lube Civitanova (Italy)	3–1	(France) Tours VB	22–25	25–20	25–21	25–15		97–81	Report
10 Feb	18:00	Sir Sicoma Monini Perugia (Italy)	3–0	(Italy) Cucine Lube Civitanova	25–21	25–18	25–21			75–60	Report
11 Feb	20:30	Tours VB (France)	1–3	(Italy) Sir Sicoma Monini Perugia	25–18	15–25	14–25	21–25		75–93	Report

=== Pool C ===
Pos	Team	Pld	W	L	Pts	SW	SL	SR	SPW	SPL	SPR	Qualification
1	(Russia) Zenit Kazan	6	6	0	18	18	2	9.000	492	282	1.745	Quarterfinals
2	(Germany) Berlin Recycling Volleys	6	4	2	12	12	6	2.000	406	266	1.526	Quarterfinals
3	(Slovenia) ACH Volley Ljubljana	6	2	4	6	8	12	0.667	442	342	1.292	
4	(Poland) Jastrzębski Węgiel (Note: Jastrzębski Węgiel withdrew from both, the first tournament held in Berlin, and from the second one held in Kazan due to coronavirus pandemic restrictions. Consequently, three remaining teams present at the tournaments claimed a 3–0 forfeit victory (25–0, 25–0, 25–0).)	6	0	6	0	0	18	0.000	0	450	0.000	

Source: CEV

==== Tournament 1 ====
- Organizer: Berlin Recycling Volleys

Date	Time		Score		Set 1	Set 2	Set 3	Set 4	Set 5	Total	Report
8 Dec	17:00	ACH Volley Ljubljana (Slovenia)	0–3	(Germany) Berlin Recycling Volleys	20–25	23–25	21–25			64–75	Report
9 Dec	19:30	Berlin Recycling Volleys (Germany)	0–3	(Russia) Zenit Kazan	21–25	19–25	18–25			58–75	Report
10 Dec	17:00	Zenit Kazan (Russia)	3–1	(Slovenia) ACH Volley Ljubljana	25–16	19–25	25–23	28–26		97–90	Report

==== Tournament 2 ====
- Organizer: Zenit Kazan

Date	Time		Score		Set 1	Set 2	Set 3	Set 4	Set 5	Total	Report
9 Feb	19:00	ACH Volley Ljubljana (Slovenia)	0–3	(Germany) Berlin Recycling Volleys	19–25	20–25	13–25			52–75	Report
10 Feb	16:00	Berlin Recycling Volleys (Germany)	0–3	(Russia) Zenit Kazan	18–25	16–25	14–25			48–75	Report
11 Feb	19:00	Zenit Kazan (Russia)	3–1	(Slovenia) ACH Volley Ljubljana	25–21	20–25	25–20	25–20		95–86	Report

=== Pool D ===
Pos	Team	Pld	W	L	Pts	SW	SL	SR	SPW	SPL	SPR	Qualification
1	(Italy) Leo Shoes Modena	6	4	2	12	14	9	1.556	533	503	1.060	Quarterfinals
2	(Poland) Projekt Warsaw	6	4	2	12	14	9	1.556	513	487	1.053	
3	(Belgium) Knack Roeselare	6	2	4	7	9	13	0.692	475	506	0.939	
4	(Russia) Kuzbass Kemerovo	6	2	4	5	8	14	0.571	476	501	0.950	

Source: CEV

==== Tournament 1 ====
- Organizer: Knack Roeselare

Date	Time		Score		Set 1	Set 2	Set 3	Set 4	Set 5	Total	Report
15 Dec	17:30	Kuzbass Kemerovo (Russia)	1–3	(Italy) Leo Shoes Modena	23–25	19–25	25–22	28–30		95–102	Report
15 Dec	20:30	Knack Roeselare (Belgium)	0–3	(Poland) Projekt Warsaw	18–25	24–26	19–25			61–76	Report
16 Dec	17:30	Projekt Warsaw (Poland)	0–3	(Italy) Leo Shoes Modena	21–25	17–25	24–26			62–76	Report
16 Dec	20:30	Knack Roeselare (Belgium)	0–3	(Russia) Kuzbass Kemerovo	24–26	16–25	20–25			60–76	Report
17 Dec	17:30	Projekt Warsaw (Poland)	3–0	(Russia) Kuzbass Kemerovo	25–22	25–22	25–16			75–60	Report
17 Dec	20:30	Leo Shoes Modena (Italy)	3–2	(Belgium) Knack Roeselare	25–27	25–19	22–25	25–22	15–11	112–104	Report

==== Tournament 2 ====
- Organizer: Leo Shoes Modena

Date	Time		Score		Set 1	Set 2	Set 3	Set 4	Set 5	Total	Report
9 Feb	18:00	Knack Roeselare (Belgium)	1–3	(Poland) Projekt Warsaw	25–20	19–25	20–25	18–25		82–95	Report
9 Feb	20:30	Kuzbass Kemerovo (Russia)	0–3	(Italy) Leo Shoes Modena	22–25	15–25	21–25			58–75	Report
10 Feb	17:30	Knack Roeselare (Belgium)	3–1	(Russia) Kuzbass Kemerovo	18–25	25–20	25–20	25–17		93–82	Report
10 Feb	20:30	Projekt Warsaw (Poland)	3–2	(Italy) Leo Shoes Modena	20–25	27–25	22–25	25–18	15–10	109–103	Report
11 Feb	18:00	Leo Shoes Modena (Italy)	0–3	(Belgium) Knack Roeselare	22–25	21–25	22–25			65–75	Report
11 Feb	20:30	Projekt Warsaw (Poland)	2–3	(Russia) Kuzbass Kemerovo	23–25	25–21	18–25	25–19	5–15	96–105	Report

=== Pool E ===
Pos	Team	Pld	W	L	Pts	SW	SL	SR	SPW	SPL	SPR	Qualification
1	(Italy) Itas Trentino	6	6	0	17	18	4	4.500	526	377	1.395	Quarterfinals
2	(Russia) Lokomotiv Novosibirsk	6	3	3	9	11	12	0.917	513	461	1.113	
3	(Germany) VfB Friedrichshafen (Note: VfB Friedrichshafen withdrew from the second tournament held in Friedrichshafen due to coronavirus pandemic restrictions. Consequently, three remaining teams present at the tournament claimed a 3–0 forfeit victory (25–0, 25–0, 25–0).)	6	2	4	6	6	13	0.462	228	442	0.516	
4	(Czech Republic) ČEZ Karlovarsko	6	1	5	4	9	15	0.600	524	511	1.025	

Source: CEV

==== Tournament 1 ====
- Organizer: Itas Trentino

Date	Time		Score		Set 1	Set 2	Set 3	Set 4	Set 5	Total	Report
1 Dec	16:00	Itas Trentino (Italy)	3–2	(Russia) Lokomotiv Novosibirsk	21–25	23–25	25–23	25–23	15–2	109–98	Report
1 Dec	19:30	ČEZ Karlovarsko (Czech Republic)	1–3	(Germany) VfB Friedrichshafen	14–25	22–25	25–23	16–25		77–98	Report
2 Dec	16:00	VfB Friedrichshafen (Germany)	3–0	(Russia) Lokomotiv Novosibirsk	25–20	25–23	25–22			75–65	Report
2 Dec	19:30	ČEZ Karlovarsko (Czech Republic)	1–3	(Italy) Itas Trentino	25–19	18–25	18–25	20–25		81–94	Report
3 Dec	16:00	VfB Friedrichshafen (Germany)	0–3	(Italy) Itas Trentino	19–25	18–25	18–25			55–75	Report
3 Dec	19:30	Lokomotiv Novosibirsk (Russia)	3–1	(Czech Republic) ČEZ Karlovarsko	25–19	25–27	25–18	25–22		100–86	Report

==== Tournament 2 ====
- Organizer: VfB Friedrichshafen

Date	Time		Score		Set 1	Set 2	Set 3	Set 4	Set 5	Total	Report
9 Feb	17:00	Itas Trentino (Italy)	3–0	(Russia) Lokomotiv Novosibirsk	25–19	25–20	25–15			75–54	Report
10 Feb	17:00	ČEZ Karlovarsko (Czech Republic)	1–3	(Italy) Itas Trentino	22–25	25–23	20–25	22–25		89–98	Report
11 Feb	17:00	Lokomotiv Novosibirsk (Russia)	3–2	(Czech Republic) ČEZ Karlovarsko	25–20	29–31	27–29	25–23	15–13	121–116	Report

=== Second place ranking ===
Pos	Team	Pld	W	L	Pts	SW	SL	SR	SPW	SPL	SPR	Qualification
1	(Italy) Cucine Lube Civitanova	6	5	1	15	15	5	3.000	479	313	1.530	Quarterfinals
2	(Poland) PGE Skra Bełchatów	6	4	2	13	14	9	1.556	524	480	1.092	Quarterfinals
3	(Germany) Berlin Recycling Volleys	6	4	2	12	12	6	2.000	406	266	1.526	Quarterfinals
4	(Poland) Projekt Warsaw	6	4	2	12	14	9	1.556	513	487	1.053	
5	(Russia) Lokomotiv Novosibirsk	6	3	3	9	11	12	0.917	513	461	1.113	

Source: CEV

== Quarterfinals ==
- The winners of the ties qualify for the semifinals.
- In case the teams are tied after two legs, a Golden Set is played immediately at the completion of the second leg.
- All times are local.

Pot 1	Pot 2
Zenit Kazan; ZAKSA Kędzierzyn-Koźle; Itas Trentino; Sir Sicoma Monini Perugia	Leo Shoes Modena; Cucine Lube Civitanova; PGE Skra Bełchatów; Berlin Recycling Volleys

Team 1	Agg.	Team 2	1st leg	2nd leg	Golden Set
PGE Skra Bełchatów (Poland)	1–5	(Russia) Zenit Kazan	1–3	2–3	
Cucine Lube Civitanova (Italy)	3–3	(Poland) ZAKSA Kędzierzyn-Koźle	1–3	3–0	14–16
Berlin Recycling Volleys (Germany)	0–6	(Italy) Itas Trentino	1–3	0–3	
Leo Shoes Modena (Italy)	3–3	(Italy) Sir Sicoma Monini Perugia	3–0	0–3	5–15

=== First leg ===
Date	Time		Score		Set 1	Set 2	Set 3	Set 4	Set 5	Total	Report
24 Feb	20:30	PGE Skra Bełchatów (Poland)	1–3	(Russia) Zenit Kazan	23–25	25–19	23–25	19–25		90–94	Report
24 Feb	18:00	Cucine Lube Civitanova (Italy)	1–3	(Poland) ZAKSA Kędzierzyn-Koźle	23–25	25–14	21–25	21–25		90–89	Report
25 Feb	19:30	Berlin Recycling Volleys (Germany)	1–3	(Italy) Itas Trentino	19–25	23–25	28–26	17–25		87–101	Report
23 Feb	18:00	Leo Shoes Modena (Italy)	3–0	(Italy) Sir Sicoma Monini Perugia	25–21	25–18	25–22			75–61	Report

=== Second leg ===
Date	Time		Score		Set 1	Set 2	Set 3	Set 4	Set 5	Total	Report
4 Mar	18:00	Zenit Kazan (Russia)	3–2	(Poland) PGE Skra Bełchatów	22–25	25–19	25–17	13–25	15–12	100–98	Report
3 Mar	18:00	ZAKSA Kędzierzyn-Koźle (Poland)	0–3	(Italy) Cucine Lube Civitanova	22–25	24–26	24–26			70–77	Report
Golden set		ZAKSA Kędzierzyn-Koźle (Poland)	16–14	(Italy) Cucine Lube Civitanova							
4 Mar	19:00	Itas Trentino (Italy)	3–0	(Germany) Berlin Recycling Volleys	25–22	25–21	25–14			75–57	Report
2 Mar	20:30	Sir Sicoma Monini Perugia (Italy)	3–0	(Italy) Leo Shoes Modena	25–23	25–18	25–21			75–62	Report
Golden set		Sir Sicoma Monini Perugia (Italy)	15–5	(Italy) Leo Shoes Modena							

== Semifinals ==
- The winners of the ties qualify for the final.
- In case the teams are tied after two legs, a Golden Set is played immediately at the completion of the second leg.
- All times are local.

Team 1	Agg.	Team 2	1st leg	2nd leg	Golden Set
Zenit Kazan (Russia)	3–3	(Poland) ZAKSA Kędzierzyn-Koźle	2–3	3–2	13–15
Itas Trentino (Italy)	4–2	(Italy) Sir Sicoma Monini Perugia	3–0	2–3	

=== First leg ===
Date	Time		Score		Set 1	Set 2	Set 3	Set 4	Set 5	Total	Report
18 Mar	19:00	Zenit Kazan (Russia)	2–3	(Poland) ZAKSA Kędzierzyn-Koźle	25–22	25–22	27–29	22–25	14–16	113–114	Report
18 Mar	19:00	Itas Trentino (Italy)	3–0	(Italy) Sir Sicoma Monini Perugia	25–21	25–16	25–23			75–60	Report

=== Second leg ===
Date	Time		Score		Set 1	Set 2	Set 3	Set 4	Set 5	Total	Report
24 Mar	18:00	ZAKSA Kędzierzyn-Koźle (Poland)	2–3	(Russia) Zenit Kazan	17–25	25–16	25–21	28–30	18–20	113–112	Report
Golden set		ZAKSA Kędzierzyn-Koźle (Poland)	15–13	(Russia) Zenit Kazan							
24 Mar	20:30	Sir Sicoma Monini Perugia (Italy)	3–2	(Italy) Itas Trentino	25–22	25–17	23–25	17–25	15–6	105–95	Report

== Final ==
- Place: Verona
- Time: Central European Summer Time (UTC+02:00).

Date	Time		Score		Set 1	Set 2	Set 3	Set 4	Set 5	Total	Report
1 May	20:30	ZAKSA Kędzierzyn-Koźle (Poland)	3–1	(Italy) Itas Trentino	25–22	25–22	20–25	28–26		98–95	Report

== Final standings ==
Qualified for the 2021 FIVB Club World Championship

Rank	Team
1st place, gold medalist(s)	(Poland) ZAKSA Kędzierzyn-Koźle
2nd place, silver medalist(s)	(Italy) Itas Trentino
Semifinalists	(Italy) Sir Sicoma Monini Perugia (Russia) Zenit Kazan

2020–21 CEV Champions League winners
(Poland)
ZAKSA Kędzierzyn-Koźle
1st title
