= 2022 Italian Volleyball Super Cup =

Italian volleyball short competition

2022 Super Cup
Tournament details
- City: Cagliari
- Dates: 31 October – 1 November 2022
- Teams: 4
- Venue: Cagliari

Final positions
- Champions: Sir Safety Susa Perugia (4th title)
- Runners-up: Cucine Lube Civitanova
- Third place: Itas Trentino
- Fourth place: Valsa Group Modena

Tournament awards
- MVP: (Ukraine) Oleh Plotnytskyi (Sir Safety Susa Perugia)

Tournament statistics
- Matches played: 4

The Del Monte Super Cup 2022 was the 27th edition of the event and the pre-season volleyball tournament of The SuperLega Credem Banca 2022–23. It was played from 31 October to 1 November 2022.

After eleven years, the tournament returned to Sardinia. The edition of Super Cup is organized by SuperLega, together with the FIPAV Sardinia Regional Committee, the Sardinia Region and the Municipality of Cagliari.

Rai Sports and Volleyball World TV are TV partners to this tournament.

Sir Safety Conad Perugia won their 4th title beating Cucine Lube Civitanova in intensive final with score 3–2. Oleh Plotnytskyi was named as the MVP.

== Format ==
Four teams participate in single-elimination tournament.

== Venues ==
All matches
Cagliari, Sardinia
PalaPirastu
Capacity: 2,266
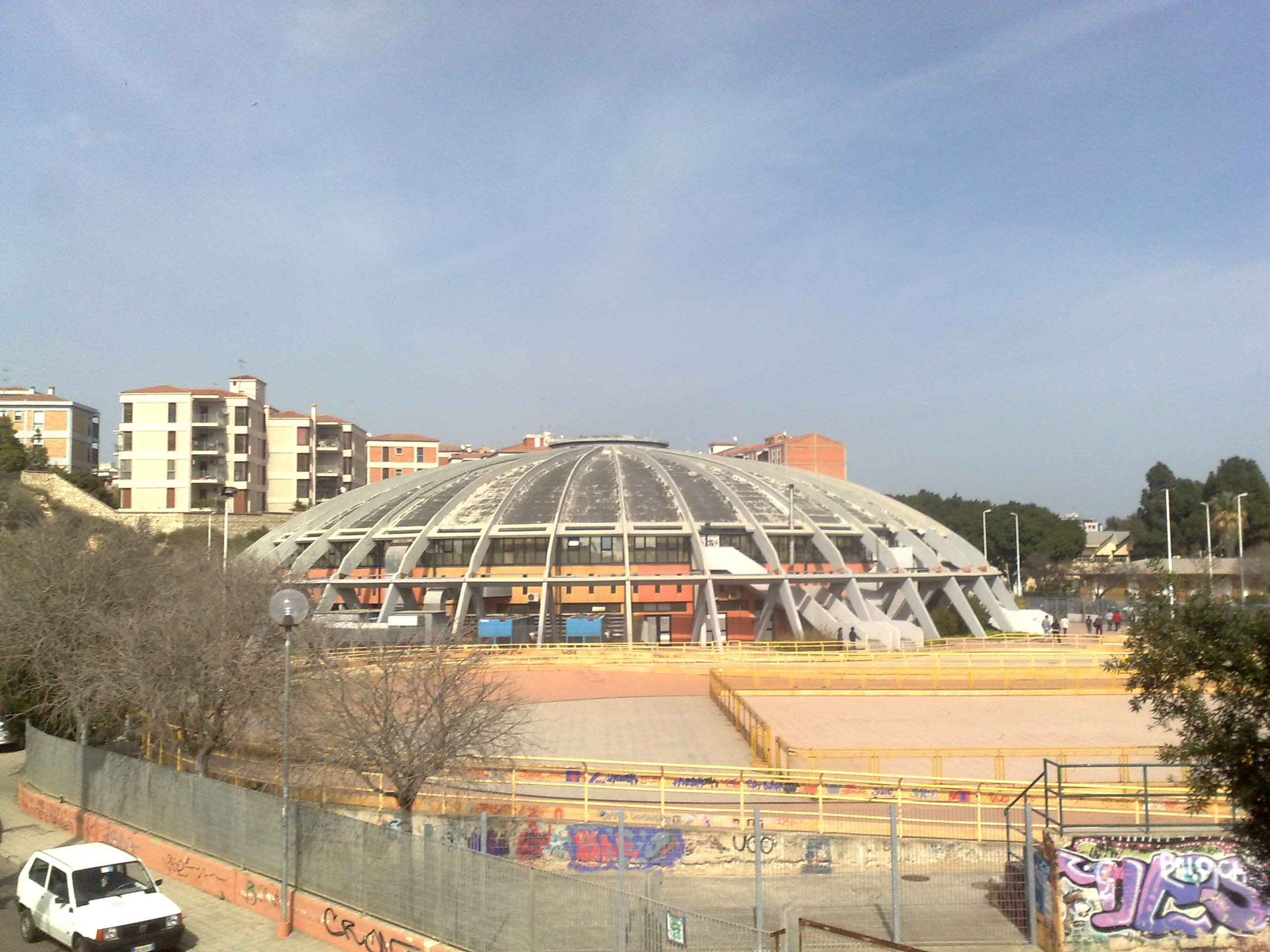

== Teams ==
Top four teams from the last season are qualified to this tournament. It's the eleven times that these four teams qualified to final four together in Super Cup history.

- Cucine Lube Civitanova
- Sir Safety Conad Perugia
- Itas Trentino
- Valsa Group Modena

== Final Four program ==
- All times are local, CET (UTC+01:00).

Semifinals
31 October
Cucine Lube Civitanova	3
Valsa Group Modena	0
31 October
Sir Safety Conad Perugia	3
Itas Trentino	2

Final
1 December
Cucine Lube Civitanova	2
Sir Safety Conad Perugia	3
3rd place match
1 December
Itas Trentino	3
Valsa Group Modena	1

=== Semifinals ===
Date	Time	Teams	Set	1	2	3	4	5	Total	Report
31 Oct	17:30	Cucine Lube Civitanova	3	25	25	25			75	Report
31 Oct	17:30	Valsa Group Modena	0	23	23	20			66	Report
31 Oct	20:30	Sir Safety Conad Perugia	3	23	25	25	22	15	110	Report
31 Oct	20:30	Itas Trentino	2	25	17	22	25	7	96	Report

=== 3rd place match ===
Date	Time	Teams	Set	1	2	3	4	5	Total	Report
1 Nov	14:00	Itas Trentino	3	25	23	33	25		106	Report
1 Nov	14:00	Valsa Group Modena	1	14	25	31	18		88	Report

=== Final ===
Date	Time	Teams	Set	1	2	3	4	5	Total	Report
1 Nov	17:00	Cucine Lube Civitanova	2	25	22	25	22	8	102	Report
1 Nov	17:00	Sir Safety Susa Perugia	3	20	25	23	25	15	108	Report

== Final standings ==
Rank	Team
1st place, gold medalist(s)	Sir Safety Susa Perugia
2nd place, silver medalist(s)	Cucine Lube Civitanova
3rd place, bronze medalist(s)	Itas Trentino
4	Valsa Group Modena

== See also ==
- 2022–23 SuperLega
- 2022–23 Italian Cup
