= Volleyball at the 2016 Summer Olympics – Men's tournament =

Men's volleyball at the Games of the XXXI Olympiad
- Venue: Ginásio do Maracanãzinho
- Date: 7–21 August 2016
- Competitors: 144 from 12 nations

Medalists
1st place, gold medalist(s)		Brazil (3rd title)
2nd place, silver medalist(s)		Italy
3rd place, bronze medalist(s)		United States

The men's tournament in volleyball at the 2016 Summer Olympics was the 14th edition of the event at the Summer Olympics, organised by the world's governing body, the FIVB, in conjunction with the IOC. It was held in Rio de Janeiro, Brazil from 7 to 21 August 2016.

Brazil won the gold medal after a 3–0 win over Italy. The United States defeated Russia 3–2 to win the bronze medal.

The medals for the competition were presented by Shamil Tarpishchev, Russia; Habu Gumel, Nigeria; and Bernard Rajzman, Brazil; Members of the International Olympic Committee and Carlos Arthur Nuzman, Honorary member of the International Olympic Committee and President of the Rio 2016 Organising Committee for the Olympic and Paralympic Games, and the gifts were presented by Ary Graça, Dr. Rafael Lloreda Currea and Dr. Amr Elwani, President and Executive Vice-Presidents of the FIVB.

== Competition schedule ==
P	Preliminary round	¼	Quarter-finals	½	Semi-finals	B	Bronze medal match	F	Final

Sun 7	Mon 8	Tue 9	Wed 10	Thu 11	Fri 12	Sat 13	Sun 14	Mon 15	Tue 16	Wed 17	Thu 18	Fri 19	Sat 20	Sun 21	
P		P		P		P		P		¼		½		B	F

== Qualification ==
Means of qualification	Date	Venue	Vacancies	Qualified
Host country	—N/a	—N/a	1	Brazil
2015 World Cup	8–23 September 2015	Japan	2	United States
2015 World Cup	8–23 September 2015	Japan	2	Italy
South American Qualifier	9–11 October 2015	(Venezuela) Maiquetía	1	Argentina
European Qualifier	5–10 January 2016	(Germany) Berlin	1	Russia
African Qualifier	7–12 January 2016	(Republic of the Congo) Brazzaville	1	Egypt
North American Qualifier	8–10 January 2016	(Canada) Edmonton	1	Cuba
Asian Qualifier*	28 May – 5 June 2016	(Japan) Tokyo	1	Iran
1st World Qualifier	28 May – 5 June 2016	(Japan) Tokyo	3	Poland
1st World Qualifier	28 May – 5 June 2016	(Japan) Tokyo	3	France
1st World Qualifier	28 May – 5 June 2016	(Japan) Tokyo	3	Canada
2nd World Qualifier	3–5 June 2016	Mexico City	1	Mexico
Total			12	

* The Asian Qualifier was combined with the 1st World Qualifier. The best Asian team qualified as the Asian Qualifier winners, while the best three ranked teams except the Asian Qualifier winners qualified as the top three teams of the 1st World Qualifier.

== Format ==
The preliminary round was a competition between the twelve teams, who were divided into two pools of six teams. This round, the teams competed in a single round-robin format. The four highest ranked teams in each pool advanced to the knockout stage (quarterfinals). The sixth placed teams in each pool were ranked eleventh in this competition. The fifth placed teams in each pool were ranked ninth.

The knockout stage followed the single-elimination format. The losers of the quarterfinals were eliminated and ranked fifth. The quarterfinal winners played in the semifinals. The winners of the semifinals competed for gold medal and the losers played for bronze medal.

== Pools composition ==
Teams were seeded following the serpentine system according to their FIVB World Ranking as of October 2015. FIVB reserved the right to seed the hosts as head of pool A regardless of the World Ranking. Rankings are shown in brackets except the hosts who ranked 1st. The pools were confirmed on 6 June 2016.

Pool A	Pool B
Brazil (Hosts)	Poland (2)
Italy (4)	Russia (3)
United States (5)	Argentina (6)
Canada (10)	Iran (8)
France (10)	Cuba (15)
Mexico (24)	Egypt (17)

== Venue ==
All matches
Rio de Janeiro, Brazil
Ginásio do Maracanãzinho
Capacity: 11,800
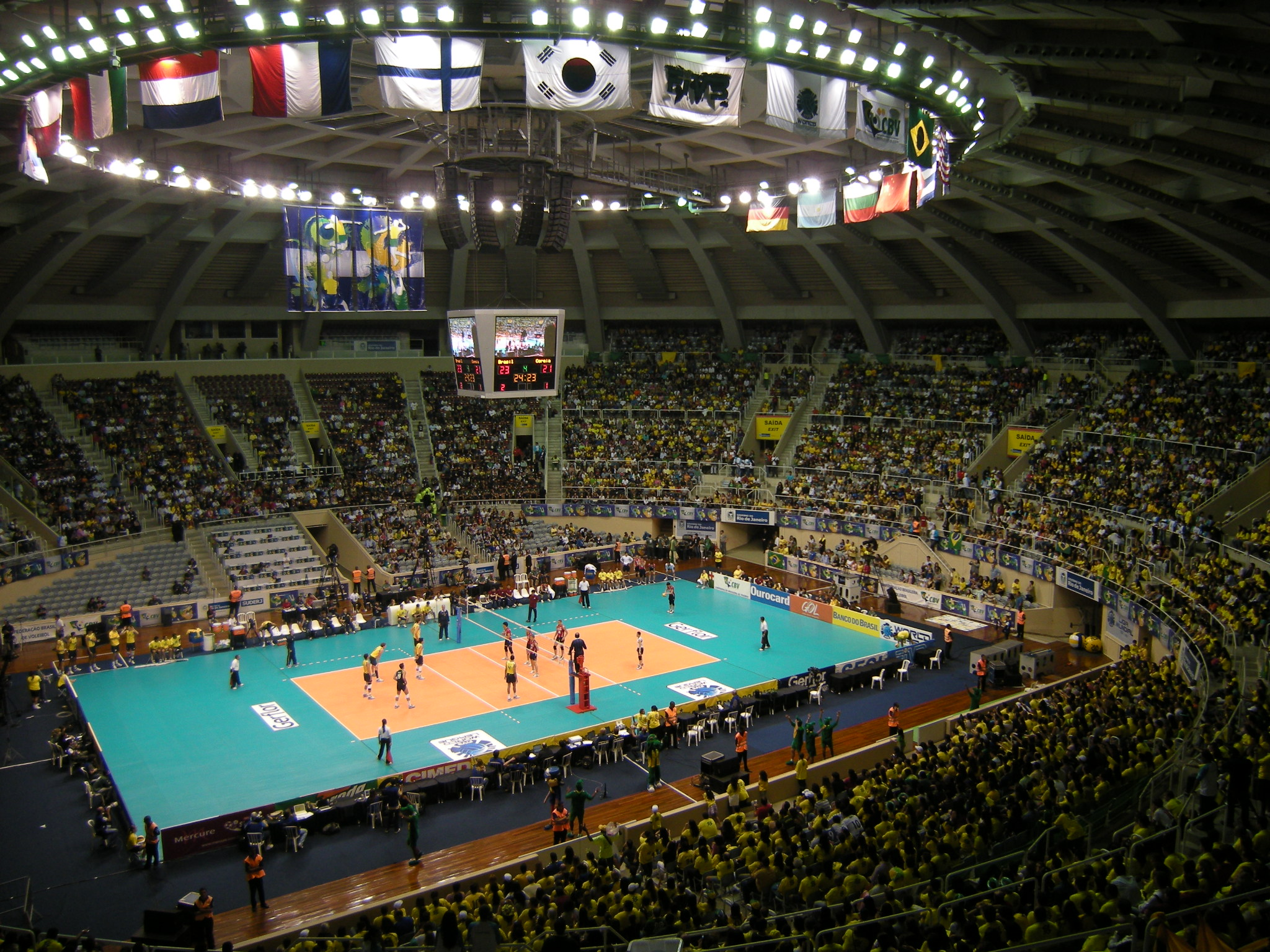

== Pool standing procedure ==
In order to establish the ranking of teams after the group stage, the following criteria should be implemented:

1. Number of matches won
2. Match points
3. Sets ratio
4. Points ratio
5. Result of the last match between the tied teams

Match won 3–0 or 3–1: 3 match points for the winner, 0 match points for the loser
Match won 3–2: 2 match points for the winner, 1 match point for the loser

== Referees ==
The following referees were selected for the tournament.

- (Argentina) Hernán Casamiquela
- (Belgium) Arturo Di Giacomo
- (Brazil) Rogerio Espicalsky
- (Brazil) Paulo Turci
- (China) Liu Jiang
- (Dominican Republic) Denny Cespedes
- (Egypt) Nasr Shaaban
- (Germany) Heike Kraft
- (Iran) Mohammad Shahmiri
- (Italy) Fabrizio Pasquali
- (Mexico) Luis Macias
- (Poland) Piotr Dudek
- (Qatar) Ibrahim Al-Naama
- (Russia) Andrey Zenovich
- (Serbia) Vladimir Simonović
- (Slovakia) Juraj Mokrý
- (South Korea) Kang Joo-hee
- (Spain) Susana Rodríguez
- (Tunisia) Taoufik Boudaya
- (United States) Patricia Rolf

== Preliminary round ==
- All times are Brasília Time (UTC−03:00).
- The top four teams in each pool qualified for the quarterfinals.

=== Pool A ===
Pos	Team	Pld	W	L	Pts	SW	SL	SR	SPW	SPL	SPR	Qualification
1	Italy	5	4	1	12	13	5	2.600	432	375	1.152	Quarterfinals
2	Canada	5	3	2	9	10	7	1.429	378	378	1.000	Quarterfinals
3	United States	5	3	2	9	10	8	1.250	419	405	1.035	Quarterfinals
4	Brazil (H)	5	3	2	9	11	9	1.222	467	442	1.057	Quarterfinals
5	France	5	2	3	6	8	9	0.889	386	367	1.052	
6	Mexico	5	0	5	0	1	15	0.067	283	398	0.711	

Source: FIVB
Rules for classification: Tiebreakers
(H) Host

7 August 2016; 09:30	Italy	3–0	France	Ginásio do Maracanãzinho, Rio de Janeiro; Attendance: 4,456; Referees: Hernán Casamiquela (ARG), Denny Cespedes (DOM)
7 August 2016; 09:30	(25–20, 25–20, 25–15); Results Statistics			Ginásio do Maracanãzinho, Rio de Janeiro; Attendance: 4,456; Referees: Hernán Casamiquela (ARG), Denny Cespedes (DOM)

7 August 2016; 11:35	Brazil	3–1	Mexico	Ginásio do Maracanãzinho, Rio de Janeiro; Attendance: 8,686; Referees: Nasr Shaaban (EGY), Arturo Di Giacomo (BEL)
7 August 2016; 11:35	(23–25, 25–19, 25–14, 25–18); Results Statistics			Ginásio do Maracanãzinho, Rio de Janeiro; Attendance: 8,686; Referees: Nasr Shaaban (EGY), Arturo Di Giacomo (BEL)

7 August 2016; 17:05	United States	0–3	Canada	Ginásio do Maracanãzinho, Rio de Janeiro; Attendance: 6,875; Referees: Andrey Zenovich (RUS), Mohammad Shahmiri (IRI)
7 August 2016; 17:05	(23–25, 17–25, 23–25); Results Statistics			Ginásio do Maracanãzinho, Rio de Janeiro; Attendance: 6,875; Referees: Andrey Zenovich (RUS), Mohammad Shahmiri (IRI)

9 August 2016; 11:55	France	3–0	Mexico	Ginásio do Maracanãzinho, Rio de Janeiro; Attendance: 6,625; Referees: Liu Jiang (CHN), Taoufik Boudaya (TUN)
9 August 2016; 11:55	(25–18, 25–12, 25–22); Results Statistics			Ginásio do Maracanãzinho, Rio de Janeiro; Attendance: 6,625; Referees: Liu Jiang (CHN), Taoufik Boudaya (TUN)

9 August 2016; 15:00	Italy	3–1	United States	Ginásio do Maracanãzinho, Rio de Janeiro; Attendance: 6,494; Referees: Vladimir Simonović (SRB), Andrey Zenovich (RUS)
9 August 2016; 15:00	(28–26, 20–25, 25–23, 25–23); Results Statistics			Ginásio do Maracanãzinho, Rio de Janeiro; Attendance: 6,494; Referees: Vladimir Simonović (SRB), Andrey Zenovich (RUS)

9 August 2016; 22:35	Brazil	3–1	Canada	Ginásio do Maracanãzinho, Rio de Janeiro; Attendance: 8,749; Referees: Luis Macias (MEX), Piotr Dudek (POL)
9 August 2016; 22:35	(24–26, 25–18, 25–22, 25–17); Results Statistics			Ginásio do Maracanãzinho, Rio de Janeiro; Attendance: 8,749; Referees: Luis Macias (MEX), Piotr Dudek (POL)

11 August 2016; 17:05	Canada	0–3	France	Ginásio do Maracanãzinho, Rio de Janeiro; Attendance: 6,498; Referees: Andrey Zenovich (RUS), Nasr Shaaban (EGY)
11 August 2016; 17:05	(19–25, 16–25, 19–25); Results Statistics			Ginásio do Maracanãzinho, Rio de Janeiro; Attendance: 6,498; Referees: Andrey Zenovich (RUS), Nasr Shaaban (EGY)

11 August 2016; 20:30	Italy	3–0	Mexico	Ginásio do Maracanãzinho, Rio de Janeiro; Attendance: 5,472; Referees: Arturo Di Giacomo (BEL), Piotr Dudek (POL)
11 August 2016; 20:30	(25–17, 25–13, 25–17); Results Statistics			Ginásio do Maracanãzinho, Rio de Janeiro; Attendance: 5,472; Referees: Arturo Di Giacomo (BEL), Piotr Dudek (POL)

11 August 2016; 22:35	Brazil	1–3	United States	Ginásio do Maracanãzinho, Rio de Janeiro; Attendance: 8,779; Referees: Liu Jiang (CHN), Vladimir Simonović (SRB)
11 August 2016; 22:35	(20–25, 23–25, 25–20, 20–25); Results Statistics			Ginásio do Maracanãzinho, Rio de Janeiro; Attendance: 8,779; Referees: Liu Jiang (CHN), Vladimir Simonović (SRB)

13 August 2016; 17:25	United States	3–1	France	Ginásio do Maracanãzinho, Rio de Janeiro; Attendance: 7,877; Referees: Arturo Di Giacomo (BEL), Luis Macias (MEX)
13 August 2016; 17:25	(25–22, 25–22, 14–25, 25–22); Results Statistics			Ginásio do Maracanãzinho, Rio de Janeiro; Attendance: 7,877; Referees: Arturo Di Giacomo (BEL), Luis Macias (MEX)

13 August 2016; 20:30	Canada	3–0	Mexico	Ginásio do Maracanãzinho, Rio de Janeiro; Attendance: 5,624; Referees: Hernán Casamiquela (ARG), Taoufik Boudaya (TUN)
13 August 2016; 20:30	(25–20, 25–13, 25–22); Results Statistics			Ginásio do Maracanãzinho, Rio de Janeiro; Attendance: 5,624; Referees: Hernán Casamiquela (ARG), Taoufik Boudaya (TUN)

13 August 2016; 22:35	Brazil	1–3	Italy	Ginásio do Maracanãzinho, Rio de Janeiro; Attendance: 8,892; Referees: Piotr Dudek (POL), Nasr Shaaban (EGY)
13 August 2016; 22:35	(25–23, 23–25, 22–25, 15–25); Results Statistics			Ginásio do Maracanãzinho, Rio de Janeiro; Attendance: 8,892; Referees: Piotr Dudek (POL), Nasr Shaaban (EGY)

15 August 2016; 11:35	United States	3–0	Mexico	Ginásio do Maracanãzinho, Rio de Janeiro; Attendance: 7,963; Referees: Mohammad Shahmiri (IRI), Piotr Dudek (POL)
15 August 2016; 11:35	(25–23, 25–11, 25–19); Results Statistics			Ginásio do Maracanãzinho, Rio de Janeiro; Attendance: 7,963; Referees: Mohammad Shahmiri (IRI), Piotr Dudek (POL)

15 August 2016; 20:30	Italy	1–3	Canada	Ginásio do Maracanãzinho, Rio de Janeiro; Attendance: 7,109; Referees: Andrey Zenovich (RUS), Hernán Casamiquela (ARG)
15 August 2016; 20:30	(23–25, 17–25, 25–16, 21–25); Results Statistics			Ginásio do Maracanãzinho, Rio de Janeiro; Attendance: 7,109; Referees: Andrey Zenovich (RUS), Hernán Casamiquela (ARG)

15 August 2016; 22:45	Brazil	3–1	France	Ginásio do Maracanãzinho, Rio de Janeiro; Attendance: 9,800; Referees: Juraj Mokrý (SVK), Nasr Shaaban (EGY)
15 August 2016; 22:45	(25–22, 22–25, 25–20, 25–23); Results Statistics			Ginásio do Maracanãzinho, Rio de Janeiro; Attendance: 9,800; Referees: Juraj Mokrý (SVK), Nasr Shaaban (EGY)

=== Pool B ===
Pos	Team	Pld	W	L	Pts	SW	SL	SR	SPW	SPL	SPR	Qualification
1	Argentina	5	4	1	12	12	4	3.000	394	335	1.176	Quarterfinals
2	Poland	5	4	1	12	14	5	2.800	447	389	1.149	Quarterfinals
3	Russia	5	4	1	11	13	6	2.167	432	367	1.177	Quarterfinals
4	Iran	5	2	3	7	8	9	0.889	389	392	0.992	Quarterfinals
5	Egypt	5	1	4	3	3	12	0.250	286	362	0.790	
6	Cuba	5	0	5	0	1	15	0.067	300	403	0.744	

Source: FIVB
Rules for classification: Tiebreakers

7 August 2016; 15:00	Poland	3–0	Egypt	Ginásio do Maracanãzinho, Rio de Janeiro; Attendance: 5,658; Referees: Juraj Mokrý (SVK), Susana Rodríguez (ESP)
7 August 2016; 15:00	(25–18, 25–20, 25–17); Results Statistics			Ginásio do Maracanãzinho, Rio de Janeiro; Attendance: 5,658; Referees: Juraj Mokrý (SVK), Susana Rodríguez (ESP)

7 August 2016; 20:30	Russia	3–1	Cuba	Ginásio do Maracanãzinho, Rio de Janeiro; Attendance: 6,287; Referees: Vladimir Simonović (SRB), Rogerio Espicalsky (BRA)
7 August 2016; 20:30	(25–17, 25–19, 22–25, 25–18); Results Statistics			Ginásio do Maracanãzinho, Rio de Janeiro; Attendance: 6,287; Referees: Vladimir Simonović (SRB), Rogerio Espicalsky (BRA)

7 August 2016; 22:35	Argentina	3–0	Iran	Ginásio do Maracanãzinho, Rio de Janeiro; Attendance: 6,460; Referees: Fabrizio Pasquali (ITA), Liu Jiang (CHN)
7 August 2016; 22:35	(25–23, 26–24, 25–18); Results Statistics			Ginásio do Maracanãzinho, Rio de Janeiro; Attendance: 6,460; Referees: Fabrizio Pasquali (ITA), Liu Jiang (CHN)

9 August 2016; 09:30	Russia	1–3	Argentina	Ginásio do Maracanãzinho, Rio de Janeiro; Attendance: 7,165; Referees: Arturo di Giacomo (BEL), Heike Kraft (GER)
9 August 2016; 09:30	(18–25, 25–18, 18–25, 21–25); Results Statistics			Ginásio do Maracanãzinho, Rio de Janeiro; Attendance: 7,165; Referees: Arturo di Giacomo (BEL), Heike Kraft (GER)

9 August 2016; 17:35	Poland	3–2	Iran	Ginásio do Maracanãzinho, Rio de Janeiro; Attendance: 7,227; Referees: Paulo Turci (BRA), Susana Rodríguez (ESP)
9 August 2016; 17:35	(25–17, 25–23, 23–25, 20–25, 18–16); Results Statistics			Ginásio do Maracanãzinho, Rio de Janeiro; Attendance: 7,227; Referees: Paulo Turci (BRA), Susana Rodríguez (ESP)

9 August 2016; 20:30	Cuba	0–3	Egypt	Ginásio do Maracanãzinho, Rio de Janeiro; Attendance: 5,016; Referees: Rogerio Espicalsky (BRA), Denny Cespedes (DOM)
9 August 2016; 20:30	(22–25, 15–25, 22–25); Results Statistics			Ginásio do Maracanãzinho, Rio de Janeiro; Attendance: 5,016; Referees: Rogerio Espicalsky (BRA), Denny Cespedes (DOM)

11 August 2016; 09:30	Iran	3–0	Cuba	Ginásio do Maracanãzinho, Rio de Janeiro; Attendance: 6,625; Referees: Fabrizio Pasquali (ITA), Juray Mokrý (SVK)
11 August 2016; 09:30	(25–21, 31–29, 25–16); Results Statistics			Ginásio do Maracanãzinho, Rio de Janeiro; Attendance: 6,625; Referees: Fabrizio Pasquali (ITA), Juray Mokrý (SVK)

11 August 2016; 11:35	Russia	3–0	Egypt	Ginásio do Maracanãzinho, Rio de Janeiro; Attendance: 6,665; Referees: Paulo Turci (BRA), Ibrahim Al-Naama (QAT)
11 August 2016; 11:35	(25–11, 25–17, 25–9); Results Statistics			Ginásio do Maracanãzinho, Rio de Janeiro; Attendance: 6,665; Referees: Paulo Turci (BRA), Ibrahim Al-Naama (QAT)

11 August 2016; 15:00	Poland	3–0	Argentina	Ginásio do Maracanãzinho, Rio de Janeiro; Attendance: 6,972; Referees: Denny Cespedes (DOM), Rogerio Espicalsky (BRA)
11 August 2016; 15:00	(25–21, 25–19, 37–35); Results Statistics			Ginásio do Maracanãzinho, Rio de Janeiro; Attendance: 6,972; Referees: Denny Cespedes (DOM), Rogerio Espicalsky (BRA)

13 August 2016; 09:30	Iran	3–0	Egypt	Ginásio do Maracanãzinho, Rio de Janeiro; Attendance: 6,262; Referees: Andrey Zenovich (RUS), Rogerio Espicalsky (BRA)
13 August 2016; 09:30	(28–26, 25–22, 25–16); Results Statistics			Ginásio do Maracanãzinho, Rio de Janeiro; Attendance: 6,262; Referees: Andrey Zenovich (RUS), Rogerio Espicalsky (BRA)

13 August 2016; 11:35	Argentina	3–0	Cuba	Ginásio do Maracanãzinho, Rio de Janeiro; Attendance: 7,428; Referees: Paulo Turci (BRA), Vladimir Simonović (SRB)
13 August 2016; 11:35	(25–16, 25–14, 25–16); Results Statistics			Ginásio do Maracanãzinho, Rio de Janeiro; Attendance: 7,428; Referees: Paulo Turci (BRA), Vladimir Simonović (SRB)

13 August 2016; 15:00	Poland	2–3	Russia	Ginásio do Maracanãzinho, Rio de Janeiro; Attendance: 7,239; Referees: Fabrizio Pasquali (ITA), Juraj Mokrý (SVK)
13 August 2016; 15:00	(18–25, 25–16, 18–25, 25–22, 13–15); Results Statistics			Ginásio do Maracanãzinho, Rio de Janeiro; Attendance: 7,239; Referees: Fabrizio Pasquali (ITA), Juraj Mokrý (SVK)

15 August 2016; 09:30	Argentina	3–0	Egypt	Ginásio do Maracanãzinho, Rio de Janeiro; Attendance: 8,175; Referees: Luis Macias (MEX), Arturo Di Giacomo (BEL)
15 August 2016; 09:30	(25–16, 25–19, 25–20); Results Statistics			Ginásio do Maracanãzinho, Rio de Janeiro; Attendance: 8,175; Referees: Luis Macias (MEX), Arturo Di Giacomo (BEL)

15 August 2016; 15:00	Russia	3–0	Iran	Ginásio do Maracanãzinho, Rio de Janeiro; Attendance: 7,387; Referees: Liu Jiang (CHN), Fabrizio Pasquali (ITA)
15 August 2016; 15:00	(25–23, 25–16, 25–20); Results Statistics			Ginásio do Maracanãzinho, Rio de Janeiro; Attendance: 7,387; Referees: Liu Jiang (CHN), Fabrizio Pasquali (ITA)

15 August 2016; 17:05	Poland	3–0	Cuba	Ginásio do Maracanãzinho, Rio de Janeiro; Attendance: 8,175; Referees: Vladimir Simonović (SRB), Ibrahim Al-Naama (QAT)
15 August 2016; 17:05	(25–18, 25–15, 25–17); Results Statistics			Ginásio do Maracanãzinho, Rio de Janeiro; Attendance: 8,175; Referees: Vladimir Simonović (SRB), Ibrahim Al-Naama (QAT)

== Knockout stage ==
- All times are Brasília Time (UTC−03:00).
- The first ranked teams of both pools played against the fourth ranked teams of the other pool. The second ranked teams faced the second or third ranked teams of the other pool, determined by drawing of lots. The drawing of lots was held after the last match in the preliminary round.

=== Bracket ===
Quarterfinals
17 August
Italy	3
Iran	0
17 August
United States	3
Poland	0
17 August
Canada	0
Russia	3
17 August
Brazil	3
Argentina	1

Semifinals
19 August
Italy	3
United States	2
19 August
Russia	0
Brazil	3

Gold medal match
21 August
Italy	0
Brazil	3
Bronze medal match
21 August
United States	3
Russia	2

=== Quarterfinals ===
17 August 2016; 10:00	Canada	0–3	Russia	Ginásio do Maracanãzinho, Rio de Janeiro; Attendance: 6,291; Referees: Arturo Di Giacomo (BEL), Mohammad Shahmiri (IRI)
17 August 2016; 10:00	(15–25, 20–25, 18–25); Results Statistics			Ginásio do Maracanãzinho, Rio de Janeiro; Attendance: 6,291; Referees: Arturo Di Giacomo (BEL), Mohammad Shahmiri (IRI)

17 August 2016; 14:00	United States	3–0	Poland	Ginásio do Maracanãzinho, Rio de Janeiro; Attendance: 8,278; Referees: Fabrizio Pasquali (ITA), Andrey Zenovich (RUS)
17 August 2016; 14:00	(25–23, 25–22, 25–20); Results Statistics			Ginásio do Maracanãzinho, Rio de Janeiro; Attendance: 8,278; Referees: Fabrizio Pasquali (ITA), Andrey Zenovich (RUS)

17 August 2016; 18:00	Italy	3–0	Iran	Ginásio do Maracanãzinho, Rio de Janeiro; Attendance: 7,213; Referees: Denny Cespedes (DOM), Juraj Mokrý (SVK)
17 August 2016; 18:00	(31–29, 25–19, 25–17); Results Statistics			Ginásio do Maracanãzinho, Rio de Janeiro; Attendance: 7,213; Referees: Denny Cespedes (DOM), Juraj Mokrý (SVK)

17 August 2016; 22:15	Brazil	3–1	Argentina	Ginásio do Maracanãzinho, Rio de Janeiro; Attendance: 9,498; Referees: Vladimir Simonović (SRB), Piotr Dudek (POL)
17 August 2016; 22:15	(25–22, 17–25, 25–19, 25–23); Results Statistics			Ginásio do Maracanãzinho, Rio de Janeiro; Attendance: 9,498; Referees: Vladimir Simonović (SRB), Piotr Dudek (POL)

=== Semifinals ===
19 August 2016; 13:00	Italy	3–2	United States	Ginásio do Maracanãzinho, Rio de Janeiro; Attendance: 8,153; Referees: Arturo Di Giacomo (BEL), Hernán Casamiquela (ARG)
19 August 2016; 13:00	(30–28, 26–28, 9–25, 25–22, 15–9); Results Statistics			Ginásio do Maracanãzinho, Rio de Janeiro; Attendance: 8,153; Referees: Arturo Di Giacomo (BEL), Hernán Casamiquela (ARG)

19 August 2016; 22:15	Russia	0–3	Brazil	Ginásio do Maracanãzinho, Rio de Janeiro; Attendance: 9,784; Referees: Juraj Mokrý (SVK), Vladimir Simonović (SRB)
19 August 2016; 22:15	(21–25, 20–25, 17–25); Results Statistics			Ginásio do Maracanãzinho, Rio de Janeiro; Attendance: 9,784; Referees: Juraj Mokrý (SVK), Vladimir Simonović (SRB)

=== Bronze medal match ===
21 August 2016; 09:30	United States	3–2	Russia	Ginásio do Maracanãzinho, Rio de Janeiro; Attendance: 6,976; Referees: Fabrizio Pasquali (ITA), Liu Jiang (CHN)
21 August 2016; 09:30	(23–25, 21–25, 25–19, 25–19, 15–13); Results Statistics			Ginásio do Maracanãzinho, Rio de Janeiro; Attendance: 6,976; Referees: Fabrizio Pasquali (ITA), Liu Jiang (CHN)

=== Gold medal match ===
21 August 2016; 13:15	Italy	0–3	Brazil	Ginásio do Maracanãzinho, Rio de Janeiro; Attendance: 9,824; Referees: Andrey Zenovich (RUS), Denny Cespedes (DOM)
21 August 2016; 13:15	(22–25, 26–28, 24–26); Results Statistics			Ginásio do Maracanãzinho, Rio de Janeiro; Attendance: 9,824; Referees: Andrey Zenovich (RUS), Denny Cespedes (DOM)

== Final standing ==
Rank	Team
1st place, gold medalist(s)	Brazil
2nd place, silver medalist(s)	Italy
3rd place, bronze medalist(s)	United States
4	Russia
5	Iran
5	Poland
5	Canada
5	Argentina
9	Egypt
9	France
11	Cuba
11	Mexico

2016 Men's Olympic champions

Brazil
3rd title

12–man roster
Bruno (c), Éder, Wallace, William, Sérgio (L), Lipe, M. Souza, Douglas, Lucas, Evandro, Lucarelli, Maurício
Head coach
Bernardinho

== Medalists ==
Gold	Silver	Bronze
Brazil Bruno Rezende (c); Éder Carbonera; Wallace de Souza; William Arjona; Sérgio Santos (L); Luiz Felipe Fonteles; Maurício Souza; Douglas Souza; Lucas Saatkamp; Evandro Guerra; Ricardo Lucarelli; Maurício Borges Silva Head coach: Bernardinho	Italy Daniele Sottile; Luca Vettori; Osmany Juantorena; Simone Giannelli; Salvatore Rossini; Ivan Zaytsev; Filippo Lanza; Simone Buti; Massimo Colaci (L); Matteo Piano; Emanuele Birarelli (c); Oleg Antonov Head coach: Gianlorenzo Blengini	United States Matthew Anderson; Aaron Russell; Taylor Sander; David Lee (c); Kawika Shoji; Reid Priddy; Murphy Troy; Thomas Jaeschke; Micah Christenson; Maxwell Holt; David Smith; Erik Shoji (L) Head coach: John Speraw

== Awards ==
- Most valuable player
  (Brazil) Sérgio Santos
- Best setter
  (Brazil) Bruno Rezende
- Best outside spikers
  (United States) Aaron Russell
  (Brazil) Ricardo Lucarelli
- Best middle blockers
  (Russia) Artem Volvich
  (Italy) Emanuele Birarelli
- Best opposite spiker
  (Brazil) Wallace de Souza
- Best libero
  (Brazil) Sérgio Santos

== Statistics leaders ==
- Only players whose teams advanced to the semifinals were ranked.

Best Scorers

Rank	Name	Points
1	(Brazil) Wallace de Souza	147
2	(United States) Matthew Anderson	128
3	(Italy) Ivan Zaytsev	127
4	(Italy) Osmany Juantorena	116
5	(United States) Aaron Russell	107

Best Spikers

Rank	Name	%Eff
1	(Russia) Maksim Mikhaylov	38.41
2	(Brazil) Wallace de Souza	36.59
3	(United States) Aaron Russell	33.50
4	(Brazil) Ricardo Lucarelli	32.92
5	(Russia) Egor Kliuka	32.74

Best Blockers

Rank	Name	Avg
1	(Russia) Artem Volvich	0.90
2	(United States) Maxwell Holt	0.65
3	(United States) David Lee	0.55
3	(Italy) Emanuele Birarelli	0.55
5	(Russia) Maksim Mikhaylov	0.50

Best Servers

Rank	Name	Avg
1	(Italy) Ivan Zaytsev	0.48
2	(United States) Maxwell Holt	0.39
3	(United States) Taylor Sander	0.35
4	(United States) Matthew Anderson	0.32
5	(Brazil) Ricardo Lucarelli	0.30
5	(Russia) Sergei Tetyukhin	0.30

Best Diggers

Rank	Name	Avg
1	(United States) Erik Shoji	1.81
2	(Italy) Massimo Colaci	1.55
3	(Italy) Osmany Juantorena	1.45
4	(Brazil) Sérgio Santos	1.33
5	(Russia) Aleksey Verbov	1.20

Best Setters

Rank	Name	Avg
1	(United States) Micah Christenson	10.97
2	(Italy) Simone Giannelli	10.79
3	(Brazil) Bruno Rezende	10.50
4	(Russia) Sergey Grankin	8.77
5	(Russia) Igor Kobzar	1.73

Best Receivers

Rank	Name	%Succ
1	(United States) Taylor Sander	48.80
2	(United States) Erik Shoji	45.18
3	(Italy) Massimo Colaci	42.04
4	(Brazil) Sérgio Santos	41.84
5	(Italy) Filippo Lanza	40.76

Source: FIVB.com

== See also ==
- Volleyball at the 2016 Summer Olympics – Women's tournament
