= 2016 Summer Olympics closing ceremony =

- Part of 2016 Summer Olympics
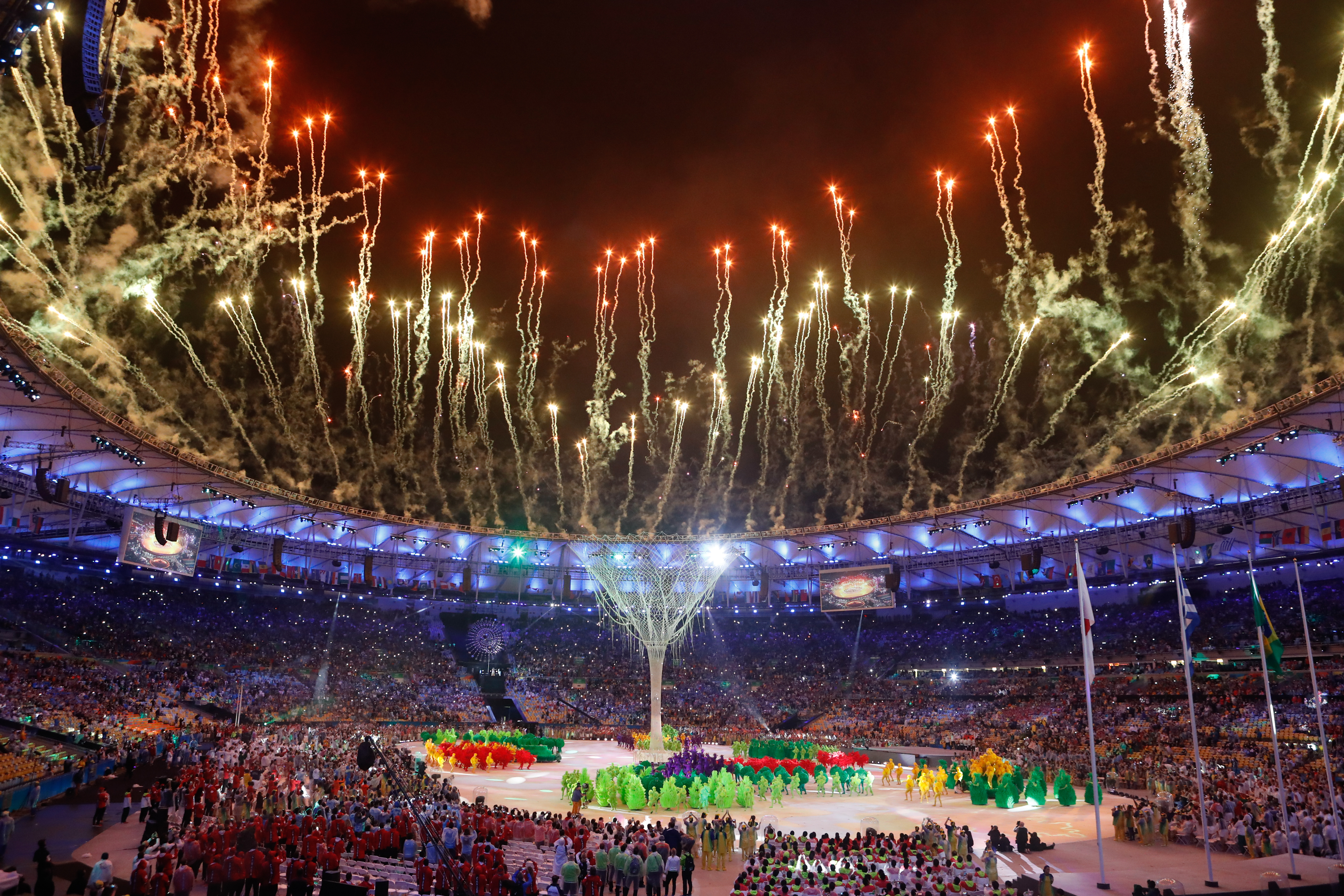
- The concert during the ceremony with the flags of Brazil, Greece and Japan at the right side, symbolizing the handover of the Olympics from Rio de Janeiro to Tokyo
- Date: 21 August 2016; 9 years ago
- Time: 20:00 – 22:50 BRT (UTC-3)
- Venue: Maracanã Stadium
- Location: Rio de Janeiro, Brazil; 22°54′44″S 43°13′49″W
- Filmed by: Olympic Broadcasting Services (OBS)
- Footage: The ceremony on the IOC YouTube channel on YouTube

The closing ceremony of the 2016 Summer Olympics was held on 21 August 2016 from 20:00 to 22:50 BRT at the Maracanã Stadium, Rio de Janeiro, Brazil.

As per traditional Olympic protocol, the ceremony featured cultural presentations from both the current (Brazil) and following (Japan) host countries, as well as closing remarks by International Olympic Committee (IOC) president Thomas Bach and the leader of the Games' organizing committee Carlos Arthur Nuzman, the official handover of the Olympic flag from Rio de Janeiro mayor Eduardo Paes to Tokyo governor Yuriko Koike, whose city hosted the 2020 Summer Olympics, and the extinguishing of the Olympic flame.

== Venue ==
For the 2014 FIFA World Cup and the 2016 Olympics and Paralympics, a major reconstruction project was initiated for the Maracanã Stadium. The original seating bowl, with a two-tier configuration, was demolished, giving way to a new one-tier seating bowl. The original stadium's concrete roof was removed and replaced with a fiberglass tensioned membrane coated with polytetrafluoroethylene. The new roof covers 95% of the seats inside the stadium, unlike the former design, where protection was only afforded to some seats in the upper ring and those above the gate access of each sector.

== Proceedings ==
=== Parade of Athletes ===
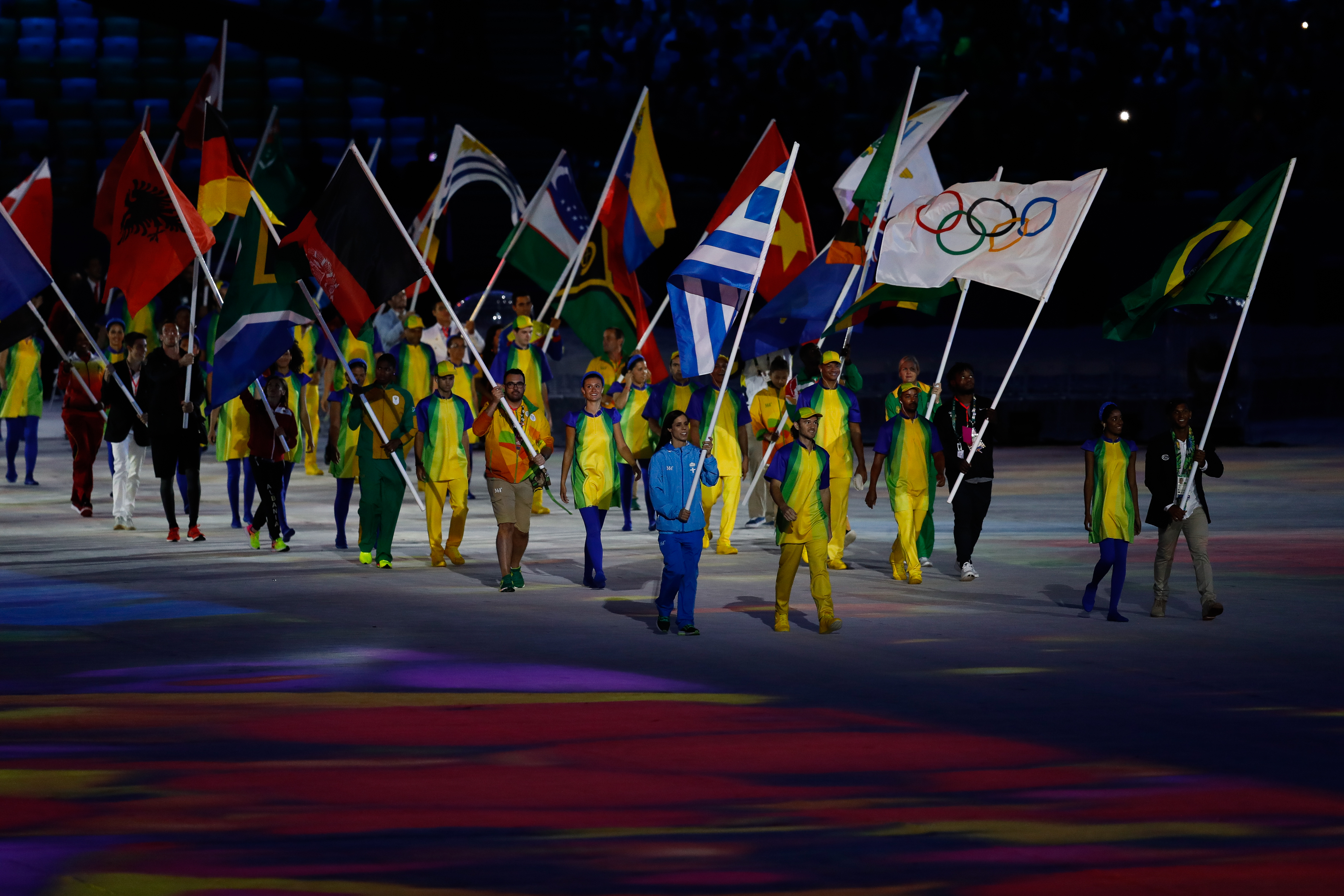
Greece and Brazil leading out the flag parade

The creative director for the ceremony was Rosa Magalhães who was known due their work in several samba schools. Amid heavy rainfall, the ceremony began with interpretive dancers representing various landmarks in the host city, with music from the Brazilian group Barbatuques, singing "Beautiful Creatures", a song from the 2014 American animated film Rio 2. Martinho da Vila then performed a rendition of the classic song "Carinhoso" by Pixinguinha. In another segment, introducing the athletes, pop singer Roberta Sá channeled Carmen Miranda, the brazilian fruit-headdress-wearing, midcentury Hollywood diva who endures as a beloved camp figure. The Parade of Flags followed shortly after a choir of 27 children, representing the states of Brazil, sang the Brazilian national anthem.

The ceremony featured a performance of "Carry Me" by Norwegian electronic music artist Kygo and American singer-songwriter Julia Michaels, as part of a segment that launched the new Olympic Channel service launching after the Games. The games' final medal awards for the men's marathon were also presented, along with the Kenyan national anthem. The final medalists are listed below :

Eliud Kipchoge - Gold
Feyisa Lilesa - Silver
Galen Rupp - Bronze

Four newly elected members of the IOC Athletes' Commission were introduced: fencer Britta Heidemann (Germany), table tennis player Ryu Seung-min (South Korea), swimmer Dániel Gyurta (Hungary) and pole vaulter Yelena Isinbayeva (Russia). Lenine then performed his song "Jack Soul Brasileiro" with slowly modified lyrics in celebration of those who volunteered during the games. The flag handover ceremony began as standard with the Greek national anthem and the Olympic anthem sung in English. Rio de Janeiro mayor Eduardo Paes handed the flag to IOC president Thomas Bach, who then handed it over to Tokyo governor Yuriko Koike. The flag was raised again in PyeongChang for the 2018 Winter Olympics on 9 February 2018 for the opening ceremony.

=== Warming up! Tokyo 2020 ===
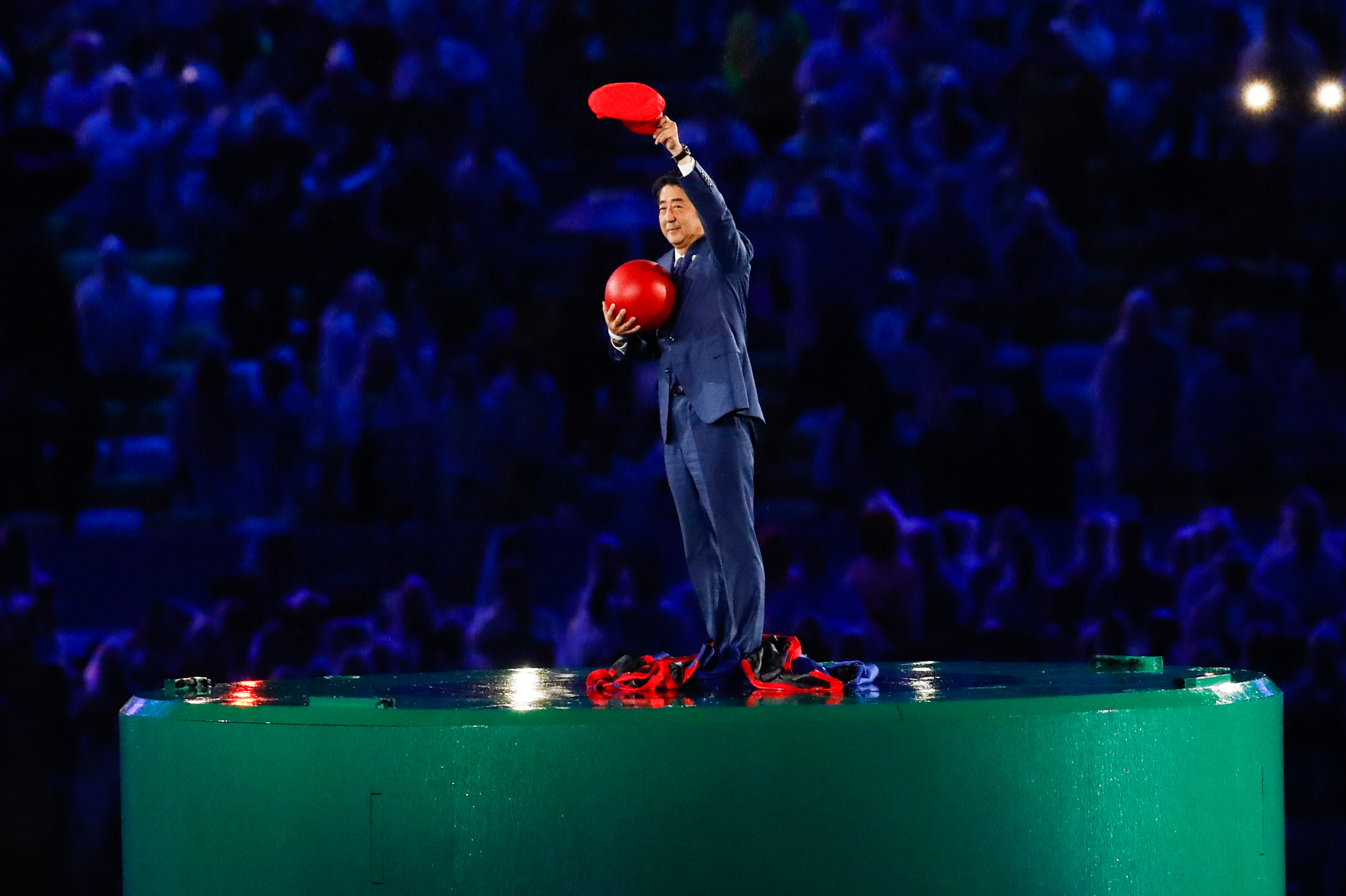
Japanese Prime Minister Shinzō Abe standing atop a Warp Pipe while holding Mario's trademark red cap and the red circle from the flag of Japan

The directors for the show were Hiroshi Sasaki (creative supervisor), Ringo Sheena (creative supervisor and music director), MIKIKO (choreographer and stage director) and Kaoru Sugano (creative director). Tokyo 2020's presentation for the next Olympics featured swimmer Kosuke Kitajima, long-distance runner Naoko Takahashi, boxer Ryōta Murata and Prime Minister Shinzō Abe. The Japanese national anthem arranged by Jun Miyake was sung while the flag of Japan was projected onto the stadium grounds while another flag was raised on the flagpole in the stadium. The flag then faded out to thank those who aided the country after the 2011 Tōhoku earthquake and tsunami.

A video presentation featuring characters from famous Japanese anime and prominent video games such as Captain Tsubasa, Doraemon, Pac-Man and Hello Kitty led up to Abe's appearance, which consisted of him transforming into Mario from Nintendo's Mario franchise and jumping out of a Warp Pipe given by Doraemon to help him get from Tokyo's Shibuya Crossing to Rio de Janeiro's Maracanã Stadium on time, emerging at the Maracanã dressed up as Mario.

Male rhythmic gymnasts from Aomori University and dancers from Elevenplay then performed a dance routine highlighting Japan's electronic culture (choreographed by Mikiko, dance director of Elevenplay), music by Capsule member Yasutaka Nakata (the songwriter and producer for popular Japanese idol artists Perfume and Kyary Pamyu Pamyu) before the presentation ended with the logo of the forthcoming Tokyo games. The last sequence of presentation used the music from Tokyo Metropolitan Theatre's 2012 play "Egg" (written by Hideki Noda, with music by Ringo Sheena) – contains the message: "'sports, music or Olympics' and 'War or Nationalism' shall not be linked again."

=== The Carnival ===
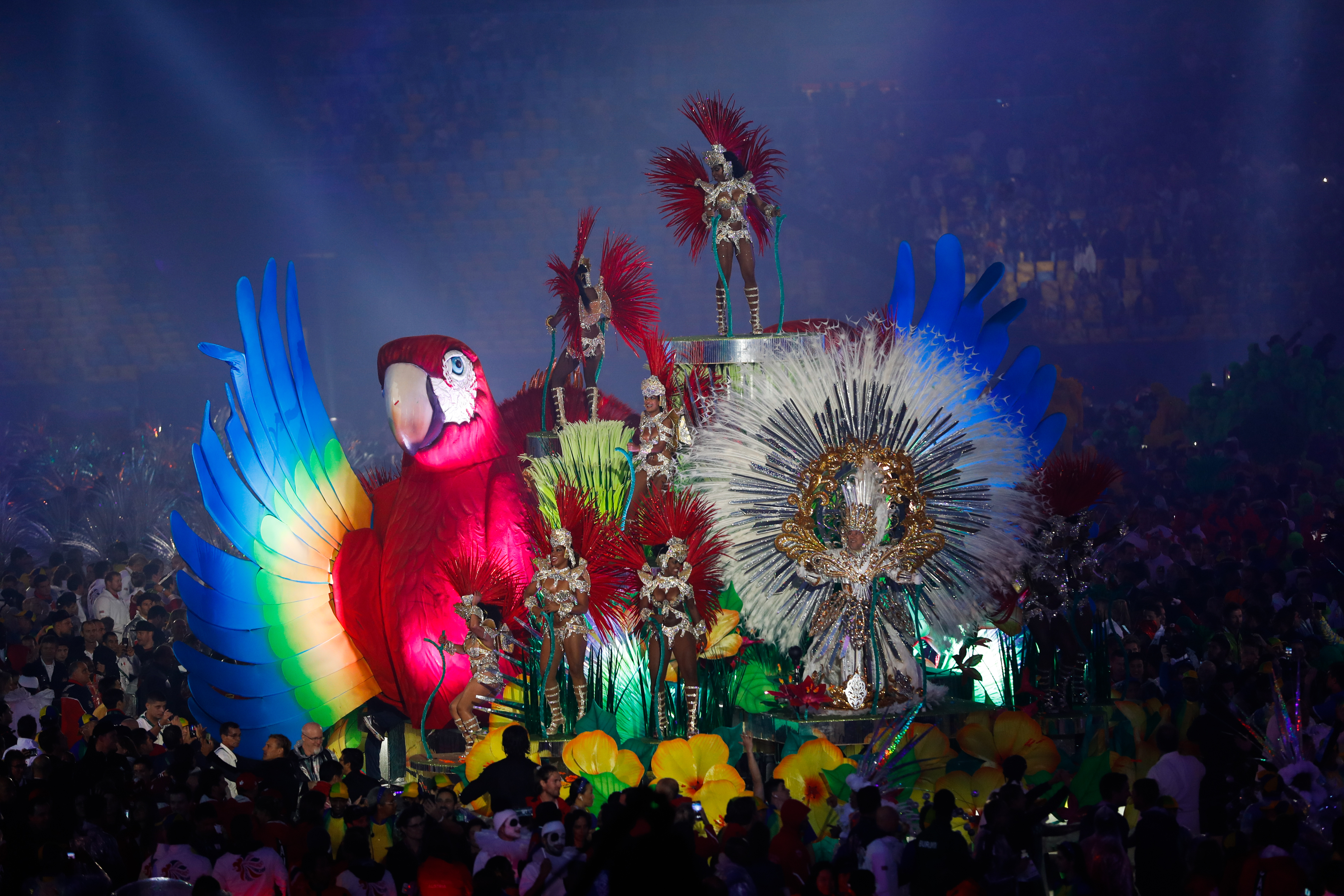
The Carnival-inspired parade

Speeches by organising committee chairman Carlos Arthur Nuzman and IOC president Bach declared the Games closed, as he called them 'Marvelous Olympic Games in The Marvelous City'. Mariene de Castro sang a rendition of ‘Pelo Tempo Que Durar’ a hit song recorded and composed by Marisa Monte in front of the Olympic cauldron as the flame was extinguished via piped rain. The ceremony ended with a fireworks display and a tribute to Rio's signature event, the Carnival, which takes place during the week before Ash Wednesday. The ending segment emulated the biggest party events held in Rio. The 250-person strong parade was led by Brazilian model Izabel Goulart, the actress Leandra Leal as "goodmother of Cordão da Bola Preta carnival block" and street cleaner Renato Sorriso, with the city anthem and a popular carnival song called Cidade Maravilhosa playing in the background. The performers in the closing ceremony consisted from six of the main singers of samba schools and their respective rhythmists Ciganerey (Mangueira), Emerson Dias (Grande Rio), Ito Melodia (União da Ilha do Governador), Leozinho Nunes (São Clemente), Tinga (Unidos da Tijuca) and Wantuir (Paraíso do Tuiuti), and the dancers who invited the world for the 2017 Rio Carnival.

==== Music ====
- Carnival Anthems medley
  - "Cidade Maravilhosa"
  - "Marcha do Cordão da Bola Preta"
  - "Me dá um dinheiro aí?"
  - "Mamãe Eu Quero"
  - "Sassaricando"
- Samba Schools medley
  - "É Hoje" - União da Ilha (1982)
  - "O Amanhã" - União da Ilha (1978)
  - "Macunaíma, Herói da nossa gente" - Portela (1975)
  - "Quero Morrer no Carnaval" - Linda Batista (1962)
  - "Festa para um Rei Negro" - Salgueiro (1971)
  - "A Lenda das sereias, Rainhas do mar" - Império Serrano (1976)
  - "A criação do mundo na tradição nagô" - Beija-Flor (1978)
  - "Aquarela Brasileira" - Império Serrano (1964)
  - "Maria Bethânia: A menina dos olhos de Oyá" - Mangueira (2016)
  - "Tambor" - Salgueiro (2009)

== Anthems ==
- 27 children from each state from Brazil – National Anthem of Brazil
- London Philharmonic Orchestra – National Anthem of Greece
- Projeto More – Olympic Anthem
- NHK Tokyo Children's Choir and Otowa Yurikago Kai – National Anthem of Japan

=== Victory ceremonies ===
- London Philharmonic Orchestra - National Anthem of Kenya (Note: Anthem played as part of the Men's marathon victory ceremony.)

== Dignitaries in attendance ==
=== Dignitaries from International organizations ===
- International Olympic Committee –
  - President Thomas Bach and IOC members

=== Host country dignitaries ===
- Brazil –
  - Mayor of Rio de Janeiro Eduardo Paes
  - Rio de Janeiro Governor Luiz Fernando Pezão
  - President of COJOPR Carlos Arthur Nuzman

=== Dignitaries from abroad ===
- Japan –
  - Prime Minister of Japan Shinzo Abe
  - Governor of Tokyo Yuriko Koike
- United States –
  - Administrator of the Environmental Protection Agency Gina McCarthy
  - U.S. Ambassador to Brazil Liliana Ayalde
  - United States Secretary of the Army Eric Fanning
  - Senior associate director of public engagement and senior policy advisor Bess Evans
  - Deputy director and deputy social secretary, Office of the First Lady Lauren Kelly
  - Retired NBA player and member of the President's Council on Fitness, Sports, and Nutrition Jason Collins
  - 4-time Olympian and founder of the Jackie Joyner-Kersee Foundation Jackie Joyner-Kersee

== See also ==
- 2016 Summer Paralympics closing ceremony

== Television coverage ==
Brazil - Globo TV; United States - NBC; United Kingdom - BBC
