= Fabio Azevedo =

Brazilian sports executive (born 1971)

President of FIVB
- Incumbent
- Assumed office November 16, 2024
- Preceded by: Ary Graça

Personal details
- Born: 14 September 1971 (age 54) Magé, Rio de Janeiro, Brazil

Fabio Azevedo (born 14 September 1971) is a Brazilian sports executive who was elected President of the Fédération Internationale de Volleyball (FIVB) in November 2024.

== Early life and education ==
Azevado was a football player in his youth with the Mageense Football Club. He studied physical education at Estácio de Sá University. During his administrative career, he has worked as a lecturer at several institutions across the world.

== Administrative career ==
Azevedo began his administrative career in volleyball at the Brazilian Volleyball Confederation, where he eventually rose to the rank of chief executive officer in 1997. In 2010 he founded Sport 4 Good, which helps sport organizations manage environmental and social concerns. After serving as a technical official at the 2012 Summer Olympics, he became FIVB's general director in 2013. During his tenure in the latter position, he spearheaded an initiative to make snow volleyball part of the Olympic Games in either a demonstration or full capacity. After serving on the FIVB Board of Administration and Volleyball World Board of Directors beginning in 2021, he was elected to the Presidency of FIVB during its 39th World Congress in Porto, Portugal on November 16, 2024, for an eight-year term.

Sporting positions
Preceded by Ary Graça	President of FIVB; 2024–present	Succeeded by present
