= Fabrizio Pasquali =

Italian volleyball referee (born 1967)

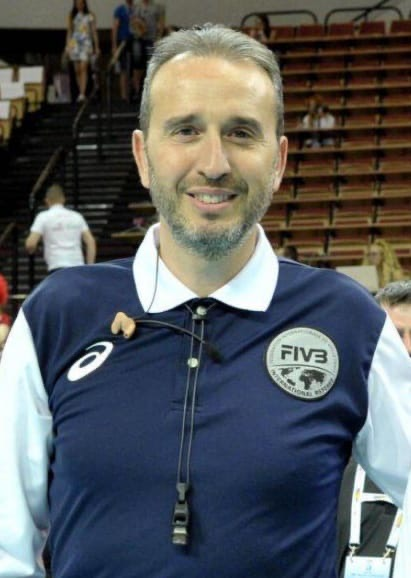

Personal information
- Occupation: volleyball referee
- Years active: 1988-2018
- Height: 194 cm (6 ft 4 in)
- Weight: 83 Kg

Sport
- Country: Italy
- Sport: Volleyball
- League: FIVB

Fabrizio Pasquali (born 11 November 1967 in Ascoli Piceno) is a former Italian volleyball referee.

One of the Italian referees with the most extensive international career, he officiated, among other events, the gold medal matches of the 2014 Women's World Championship and the 2018 Men's World Championship.

== Career ==
Throughout his career, Pasquali officiated on every continent and in all major international competitions. He refereed in Italy’s top division (Serie A) as well as international tournaments organized by the FIVB and the CEV, including the World Championship, World Cup, World Grand Prix, Nations League, and the CEV Champions League.

He is the only Italian referee to have officiated at three senior World Championships (2010, 2014, 2018).

Notable appointments include:

- Bronze medal match at the 2016 Rio de Janeiro Olympic Games
- Gold medal matches at the 2014 Women's World Championship and 2018 Men's World Championship, and the final of the 2015 FIVB Volleyball Men's World Cup in Japan
- CEV Champions League finals in 2008 and 2010
- Finals of the 2013 U23 World Championship in Brazil and the 2017 U23 World Championship in Slovenia
- World League finals in 2014 (Sydney) and 2017 (Curitiba)
- Final of the 2018 Volleyball Nations League in Lille

At the national level, he refereed numerous Serie A matches, including one Italian Cup final in Serie A2, several finals of the Serie A1 Italian Cup and Supercup, and 14 Italian Championship finals (10 men’s and 4 women’s).

In 2016 he was appointed national instructor for the FIPAV.

Pasquali retired from international refereeing in 2018.

From 2018 to 2021 he served as Commissioner of Serie A referees for FIPAV. That same year he was appointed CEV Referee Delegate. In 2021 he joined the Fédération Internationale de Volleyball.

== Awards and honors ==
- Stella di bronzo al merito sportivo (2009, CONI)
- Stella d'argento al merito sportivo (2013, CONI)
- Ranked No.1 in the FIVB World Referees Ranking (2014–2018)
- Premio Can 2015 as best referee in the historical ranking (2010–2014)
- Premio Ilario Toniolo (2015) as best referee of SuperLega
- Arbitro dell'anno awarded by CONI Marche in 2002, 2010, 2018
- Ascolano dell'anno (2008, 2011, 2013, 2014, 2016, 2017, 2018)
- Sportivo dell'anno 2018 USSI Marche
- Premio Tonino Carino (2011)
- Sportivo dell'anno 2017 (Provincia di Ascoli)
- Farfalla d'oro (2017, Offida)
- Battilardo d'oro (2013, Marche)

== Personal life ==
Pasquali lives in Ascoli Piceno. He has two children, Lorenzo and Diletta, both volleyball players.

Outside volleyball, he runs a business in the industrial freight transport sector.
