= Volleyball at the 2016 Summer Olympics – Men's qualification =

2016 Volleyball at the Summer Olympics – Men's qualification
- Dates: 8 September 2015 – 5 June 2016
- Teams: 27 (from 5 confederations)

The qualification for the 2016 Men's Olympic Volleyball Tournament was held from 8 September 2015 to 5 June 2016. Twelve teams qualified, the hosts, the FIVB World Cup champions and runners-up, five continental Olympic qualification tournament champions and four teams from two World Olympic qualification tournaments. Teams already qualified for the event were not eligible to play in the following qualification tournaments.

== Qualification summary ==
Means of qualification	Date	Venue	Vacancies	Qualified
Host country	—N/a	—N/a	1	Brazil
2015 World Cup	8–23 September 2015	Japan	2	United States
2015 World Cup	8–23 September 2015	Japan	2	Italy
South American Qualifier	9–11 October 2015	(Venezuela) Maiquetía	1	Argentina
European Qualifier	5–10 January 2016	(Germany) Berlin	1	Russia
African Qualifier	7–12 January 2016	(Republic of the Congo) Brazzaville	1	Egypt
North American Qualifier	8–10 January 2016	(Canada) Edmonton	1	Cuba
Asian Qualifier*	28 May – 5 June 2016	(Japan) Tokyo	1	Iran
1st World Qualifier	28 May – 5 June 2016	(Japan) Tokyo	3	Poland
1st World Qualifier	28 May – 5 June 2016	(Japan) Tokyo	3	France
1st World Qualifier	28 May – 5 June 2016	(Japan) Tokyo	3	Canada
2nd World Qualifier	3–5 June 2016	Mexico City	1	Mexico
Total			12	

* The Asian Qualifier was combined with the 1st World Qualifier. The best Asian team qualified as the Asian Qualifier winners, while the best three ranked teams except the Asian Qualifier winners qualified as the top three teams of the 1st World Qualifier.

== Means of qualification ==
Qualified for the 2016 Summer Olympics
Qualified for the 2016 1st World Olympic Qualification Tournament
Qualified for the 2016 2nd World Olympic Qualification Tournament

== Pool standing procedure ==
For all qualification tournaments except North and South American qualification tournaments

1. Number of matches won
2. Match points
3. Sets ratio
4. Points ratio
5. Result of the last match between the tied teams

Match won 3–0 or 3–1: 3 match points for the winner, 0 match points for the loser
Match won 3–2: 2 match points for the winner, 1 match point for the loser

For North American qualification tournament only

1. Number of matches won
2. Match points
3. Points ratio
4. Sets ratio
5. Result of the last match between the tied teams

Match won 3–0: 5 match points for the winner, 0 match points for the loser
Match won 3–1: 4 match points for the winner, 1 match point for the loser
Match won 3–2: 3 match points for the winner, 2 match points for the loser

For South American qualification tournament only

1. Match points
2. Sets ratio
3. Points ratio
4. Result of the last match between the tied teams

2 match points for the winner, 1 match point for the loser

== Host country ==
FIVB reserved a vacancy for the 2016 Summer Olympics host country to participate in the tournament.

- Brazil

== 2015 World Cup ==
- Venues: Japan
- Dates: 8–23 September 2015
- The top two teams qualified for the 2016 Summer Olympics.

Rank	Team
1st place, gold medalist(s)	United States
2nd place, silver medalist(s)	Italy
3rd place, bronze medalist(s)	Poland
4	Russia
5	Argentina
6	Japan
7	Canada
8	Iran
9	Australia
10	Egypt
11	Venezuela
12	Tunisia

== Continental qualification tournaments ==
=== Africa ===
- Venue: Henri Elende Hall, Brazzaville, Congo
- Dates: 7–12 January 2016
- The winners qualified for the 2016 Summer Olympics. The second and third ranked teams qualified for the 2016 2nd World Olympic Qualification Tournament.

Rank	Team	Qualification
1	Egypt	2016 Summer Olympics
2	Tunisia	2016 2nd World Olympic; Qualification Tournament
3	Algeria	2016 2nd World Olympic; Qualification Tournament
4	Cameroon	
5	Congo	
6	DR Congo	
7	Nigeria	

=== Asia and Oceania ===
The 2016 Asian Olympic Qualification Tournament combined with 2016 1st World Olympic Qualification Tournament. The hosts Japan and the top three ranked teams except Japan from the FIVB World Ranking as of October 2015 competed in the tournament. The top ranked among the four teams qualified for the 2016 Summer Olympics as the 2016 Asian Olympic Qualification Tournament winners.

=== Europe ===
The hosts Germany and the top seven ranked teams from the CEV European Ranking as of 19 October 2015 which had not yet qualified to the 2016 Summer Olympics competed in the 2016 European Olympic Qualification Tournament.

- Venue: Max-Schmeling-Halle, Berlin, Germany
- Dates: 5–10 January 2016
- The winners qualified for the 2016 Summer Olympics. The second and third ranked teams qualified for the 2016 1st World Olympic Qualification Tournament.

Rank	Team
1	Russia
2	France
3	Poland
4	Germany
5	Serbia
6	Bulgaria
7	Belgium
8	Finland

=== North America ===
The top four teams from the 2015 NORCECA Championship competed in the 2016 North American Olympic Qualification Tournament.

- Venue: Saville Community Sports Centre, Edmonton, Canada
- Dates: 8–10 January 2016
- All times are Mountain Standard Time (UTC−07:00).
- The winners qualified for the 2016 Summer Olympics. The runners-up qualified for the 2016 1st World Olympic Qualification Tournament, whereas the third ranked team qualified for the 2016 2nd World Olympic Qualification Tournament.

Pos	Team	Pld	W	L	Pts	SPW	SPL	SPR	SW	SL	SR
1	Cuba	3	3	0	15	233	190	1.226	9	0	MAX
2	Canada	3	2	1	10	207	194	1.067	6	3	2.000
3	Mexico	3	1	2	3	224	258	0.868	3	8	0.375
4	Puerto Rico	3	0	3	2	242	264	0.917	2	9	0.222

Date	Time		Score		Set 1	Set 2	Set 3	Set 4	Set 5	Total	Report
8 Jan	17:10	Canada	3–0	Mexico	25–19	25–23	25–16			75–58	P2 P3
8 Jan	19:10	Cuba	3–0	Puerto Rico	25–22	25–20	33–31			83–73	P2 P3
9 Jan	13:45	Canada	3–0	Puerto Rico	25–16	25–22	25–23			75–61	P2 P3
9 Jan	16:10	Mexico	0–3	Cuba	15–25	22–25	23–25			60–75	P2 P3
10 Jan	17:10	Puerto Rico	2–3	Mexico	25–23	25–16	24–26	24–26	10–15	108–106	P2 P3
10 Jan	19:55	Canada	0–3	Cuba	15–25	21–25	21–25			57–75	P2 P3

=== South America ===
- Venue: Domo José María Vargas, Maiquetía, Venezuela
- Dates: 9–11 October 2015
- All times are Venezuelan Standard Time (UTC−04:30).
- The winners qualified for the 2016 Summer Olympics. The runners-up qualified for the 2016 1st World Olympic Qualification Tournament, whereas the third ranked team qualified for the 2016 2nd World Olympic Qualification Tournament.

Pos	Team	Pld	W	L	Pts	SW	SL	SR	SPW	SPL	SPR
1	Argentina	3	3	0	6	9	2	4.500	262	191	1.372
2	Venezuela	3	2	1	5	8	6	1.333	302	309	0.977
3	Chile	3	1	2	4	5	8	0.625	287	299	0.960
4	Colombia	3	0	3	3	3	9	0.333	254	306	0.830

Date	Time		Score		Set 1	Set 2	Set 3	Set 4	Set 5	Total
9 Oct	16:00	Argentina	3–0	Colombia	25–13	25–19	25–13			75–45
9 Oct	19:00	Chile	2–3	Venezuela	18–25	21–25	25–20	27–25	11–15	102–110
10 Oct	16:00	Argentina	3–0	Chile	25–22	25–17	25–19			75–58
10 Oct	19:00	Venezuela	3–1	Colombia	25–19	25–22	23–25	31–29		104–95
11 Oct	16:00	Colombia	2–3	Chile	36–34	20–25	18–25	30–28	10–15	114–127
11 Oct	19:00	Venezuela	2–3	Argentina	12–25	25–22	12–25	27–25	12–15	88–112

== World qualification tournaments ==
There were 2 tournaments to get 5 remaining spots in the 2016 Summer Olympics. Only the teams which had not yet qualified from the 3 events above played in the tournaments. 12 teams had rights to play in the tournaments, Japan as the hosts of the 1st tournament, the top three Asian teams except Japan from the FIVB World Ranking as of October 2015 and the second and third ranked teams from continental qualification tournaments. The 1st tournament was combined with the 2016 Asian Olympic qualification tournament which played in Japan. The best ranked Asian team qualified for the 2016 Summer Olympics. The best three ranked teams, excluding the best Asian team, also secured the vacancies in the 2016 Summer Olympics. The 2nd tournament which was held in Mexico consisted of 4 teams, and only the best ranked team took the last spot for the 2016 Summer Olympics. The table below showed the allocation of 12 qualified teams.

1st tournament				2nd tournament	
Qualification	Qualifier	Qualification	Qualifier	Qualification	Qualifier
Host country	Japan	European QT	France	African QT	Tunisia
World Ranking for Asian teams	Iran	European QT	Poland	African QT	Algeria
World Ranking for Asian teams	Australia	North American QT 2nd	Canada	North American QT 3rd	Mexico
World Ranking for Asian teams	China	South American QT 2nd	Venezuela	South American QT 3rd	Chile

=== 1st tournament ===
- Venue: Tokyo Metropolitan Gymnasium, Tokyo, Japan
- Dates: 28 May – 5 June 2016
- All times are Japan Standard Time (UTC+09:00).

Pos	Team	Pld	W	L	Pts	SW	SL	SR	SPW	SPL	SPR
1	Poland	7	6	1	15	19	9	2.111	639	584	1.094
2	Iran	7	6	1	15	18	11	1.636	668	637	1.049
3	France	7	5	2	15	17	10	1.700	637	571	1.116
4	Canada	7	4	3	12	16	14	1.143	654	640	1.022
5	Australia	7	3	4	10	12	14	0.857	599	612	0.979
6	China	7	2	5	9	14	15	0.933	627	635	0.987
7	Japan	7	2	5	6	8	16	0.500	547	573	0.955
8	Venezuela	7	0	7	2	6	21	0.286	524	643	0.815

Date	Time		Score		Set 1	Set 2	Set 3	Set 4	Set 5	Total	Report
28 May	10:10	Iran	3–0	Australia	25–19	25–17	25–18			75–54	P2 P3
28 May	12:55	China	1–3	France	13–25	25–22	23–25	21–25		82–97	P2 P3
28 May	15:40	Poland	3–2	Canada	25–18	17–25	25–21	18–25	15–9	100–98	P2 P3
28 May	19:20	Japan	3–1	Venezuela	26–28	25–20	25–19	25–19		101–86	P2 P3
29 May	10:10	Canada	2–3	Iran	29–27	25–19	20–25	21–25	14–16	109–112	P2 P3
29 May	13:15	Venezuela	1–3	Australia	25–19	20–25	10–25	19–25		74–94	P2 P3
29 May	15:40	France	2–3	Poland	25–22	25–13	29–31	17–25	12–15	108–106	P2 P3
29 May	19:15	Japan	0–3	China	20–25	22–25	23–25			65–75	P2 P3
31 May	10:10	Australia	2–3	Canada	19–25	26–24	25–20	27–29	11–15	108–113	P2 P3
31 May	12:55	China	3–0	Venezuela	25–16	25–18	25–15			75–49	P2 P3
31 May	15:40	Iran	0–3	France	20–25	18–25	22–25			60–75	P2 P3
31 May	19:20	Poland	3–0	Japan	25–22	25–16	25–23			75–61	P2 P3
1 Jun	10:10	Venezuela	0–3	Canada	20–25	20–25	25–27			65–77	P2 P3
1 Jun	12:55	France	3–1	Australia	25–22	25–18	16–25	44–42		110–107	P2 P3
1 Jun	15:40	China	2–3	Poland	28–26	25–20	16–25	17–25	10–15	96–111	P2 P3
1 Jun	19:15	Japan	1–3	Iran	20–25	25–19	22–25	25–27		92–96	P2 P3
2 Jun	10:10	Canada	0–3	France	17–25	17–25	16–25			50–75	P2 P3
2 Jun	12:55	Iran	3–2	China	26–24	22–25	25–19	17–25	18–16	108–109	P2 P3
2 Jun	15:40	Poland	3–0	Venezuela	25–21	25–17	25–18			75–56	P2 P3
2 Jun	19:20	Australia	3–0	Japan	25–23	25–19	29–27			79–69	P2 P3
4 Jun	10:10	China	1–3	Australia	23–25	22–25	25–20	24–26		94–96	P2 P3
4 Jun	12:55	Venezuela	2–3	France	21–25	25–23	11–25	25–20	9–15	91–108	P2 P3
4 Jun	15:40	Poland	1–3	Iran	20–25	18–25	25–20	32–34		95–104	P2 P3
4 Jun	19:15	Japan	1–3	Canada	25–23	19–25	21–25	19–25		84–98	P2 P3
5 Jun	10:10	Iran	3–2	Venezuela	25–23	27–29	21–25	25–18	15–8	113–103	P2 P3
5 Jun	12:55	Canada	3–2	China	25–16	20–25	24–26	25–20	15–9	109–96	P2 P3
5 Jun	15:40	Australia	0–3	Poland	21–25	15–25	25–27			61–77	P2 P3
5 Jun	19:20	France	0–3	Japan	18–25	23–25	23–25			64–75	P2 P3

=== 2nd tournament ===
- Venue: Gimnasio Olímpico Juan de la Barrera, Mexico City, Mexico
- Dates: 3–5 June 2016
- All times are Central Daylight Time (UTC−05:00).

Pos	Team	Pld	W	L	Pts	SW	SL	SR	SPW	SPL	SPR
1	Mexico	3	2	1	7	8	4	2.000	286	260	1.100
2	Chile	3	2	1	6	7	4	1.750	263	245	1.073
3	Tunisia	3	2	1	5	6	6	1.000	273	273	1.000
4	Algeria	3	0	3	0	2	9	0.222	227	271	0.838

Date	Time		Score		Set 1	Set 2	Set 3	Set 4	Set 5	Total	Report
3 Jun	18:00	Chile	3–0	Tunisia	25–21	25–21	25–21			75–63	P2 P3
3 Jun	20:30	Mexico	3–0	Algeria	25–21	25–16	25–21			75–58	P2 P3
4 Jun	18:00	Tunisia	3–1	Algeria	25–14	22–25	26–24	25–21		98–84	P2 P3
4 Jun	20:30	Mexico	3–1	Chile	22–25	25–21	25–22	25–22		97–90	P2 P3
5 Jun	18:00	Algeria	1–3	Chile	25–23	18–25	19–25	23–25		85–98	P2 P3
5 Jun	20:30	Mexico	2–3	Tunisia	25–23	23–25	23–25	25–19	18–20	114–112	P2 P3

== See also ==
- Volleyball at the 2016 Summer Olympics – Women's qualification
