= Volleyball at the 2016 Summer Olympics – Men's European qualification =

2016 Men's European Olympic Qualification Tournament
Tournament details
- Host country: Germany
- City: Berlin
- Dates: 5–10 January
- Teams: 8 (from 1 confederation)
- Venue: 1 (in 1 host city)

Final positions
- Champions: Russia (3rd title)
- Runners-up: France
- Third place: Poland
- Fourth place: Germany

Tournament awards
- MVP: (Russia) Sergey Tetyukhin
- Best Setter: (France) Benjamin Toniutti
- Best OH: (France) Earvin N'Gapeth (Germany) Denys Kaliberda
- Best MB: (Germany) Marcus Böhme (Poland) Mateusz Bieniek
- Best OPP: (Russia) Maxim Mikhaylov
- Best Libero: (France) Jenia Grebennikov

Tournament statistics
- Matches played: 16

The European Qualification Tournament for the 2016 Men's Olympic Volleyball Tournament was held in Berlin, Germany from 5 to 10 January 2016. Russia won the tournament by beating France 3–1, and qualified for the Summer Olympics. Sergey Tetyukhin was selected the most valuable player.

== Qualification ==
The hosts Germany and the top seven ranked teams from the CEV European Ranking as of 19 October 2015 which had not yet qualified to the 2016 Summer Olympics qualified for the tournament. Rankings are shown in brackets except the hosts who ranked 4th.

- Germany (Hosts)
- Russia (1)
- Bulgaria (3)
- Poland (4)
- Serbia (6)
- France (7)
- Finland (8)
- Belgium (9)

== Pools composition ==
Teams were seeded following the serpentine system according to their CEV European Ranking as of 19 October 2015. CEV reserved the right to seed the hosts as head of pool A regardless of the European Ranking. The pools were confirmed on 23 October 2015.

Pool A	Pool B
Germany	Russia
Poland	Bulgaria
Serbia	France
Belgium	Finland

== Venue ==
All matches
Berlin, Germany
Max-Schmeling-Halle
Capacity: 8,500
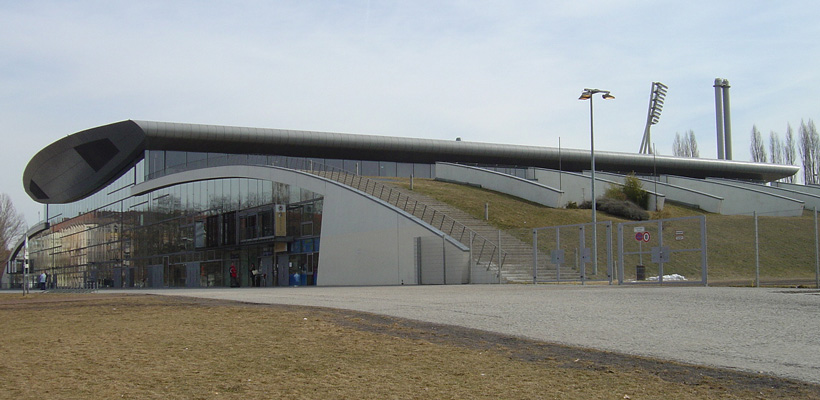

== Pool standing procedure ==
1. Number of matches won
2. Match points
3. Sets ratio
4. Points ratio
5. Result of the last match between the tied teams

Match won 3–0 or 3–1: 3 match points for the winner, 0 match points for the loser
Match won 3–2: 2 match points for the winner, 1 match point for the loser

== Preliminary round ==
- All times are Central European Time (UTC+01:00).

Qualified for the Semifinals

=== Pool A ===
Pos	Team	Pld	W	L	Pts	SW	SL	SR	SPW	SPL	SPR	Qualification
1	Germany	3	3	0	8	9	2	4.500	261	232	1.125	Semifinals
2	Poland	3	2	1	7	8	4	2.000	276	260	1.062	Semifinals
3	Serbia	3	1	2	3	4	7	0.571	247	258	0.957	
4	Belgium	3	0	3	0	1	9	0.111	221	255	0.867	

Date	Time		Score		Set 1	Set 2	Set 3	Set 4	Set 5	Total	Report
5 Jan	18:00	Belgium	0–3	Germany	26–28	19–25	24–26			69–79	Report
5 Jan	20:30	Serbia	1–3	Poland	25–22	18–25	23–25	21–25		87–97	Report
6 Jan	18:00	Germany	3–0	Serbia	25–20	26–24	25–20			76–64	Report
7 Jan	15:00	Poland	3–0	Belgium	25–20	30–28	25–19			80–67	Report
8 Jan	14:00	Serbia	3–1	Belgium	25–18	21–25	25–21	25–21		96–85	Report
8 Jan	20:00	Poland	2–3	Germany	25–21	17–25	22–25	25–20	10–15	99–106	Report

=== Pool B ===
Pos	Team	Pld	W	L	Pts	SW	SL	SR	SPW	SPL	SPR	Qualification
1	France	3	3	0	9	9	1	9.000	245	187	1.310	Semifinals
2	Russia	3	2	1	6	7	3	2.333	226	206	1.097	Semifinals
3	Bulgaria	3	1	2	3	3	7	0.429	215	239	0.900	
4	Finland	3	0	3	0	1	9	0.111	198	252	0.786	

Date	Time		Score		Set 1	Set 2	Set 3	Set 4	Set 5	Total	Report
5 Jan	15:00	Finland	0–3	Russia	17–25	16–25	19–25			52–75	Report
6 Jan	15:00	Bulgaria	3–1	Finland	29–27	25–15	23–25	25–22		102–89	Report
6 Jan	20:30	Russia	1–3	France	15–25	25–20	17–25	19–25		76–95	Report
7 Jan	18:00	Bulgaria	0–3	Russia	20–25	22–25	17–25			59–75	Report
7 Jan	20:30	France	3–0	Finland	25–21	25–20	25–16			75–57	Report
8 Jan	17:00	France	3–0	Bulgaria	25–19	25–20	25–15			75–54	Report

== Final round ==
- All times are Central European Time (UTC+01:00).

Semifinals
9 January
France	3
Poland	0
9 January
Germany	1
Russia	3

Final
10 January
France	1
Russia	3
3rd place match
10 January
Poland	3
Germany	2

=== Semifinals ===
Date	Time		Score		Set 1	Set 2	Set 3	Set 4	Set 5	Total	Report
9 Jan	16:35	Germany	1–3	Russia	33–31	22–25	19–25	24–26		98–107	Report
9 Jan	19:35	France	3–0	Poland	29–27	32–30	25–20			86–77	Report

=== 3rd place match ===
Date	Time		Score		Set 1	Set 2	Set 3	Set 4	Set 5	Total	Report
10 Jan	13:35	Poland	3–2	Germany	20–25	25–22	16–25	28–26	16–14	105–112	Report

=== Final ===
Date	Time		Score		Set 1	Set 2	Set 3	Set 4	Set 5	Total	Report
10 Jan	16:35	France	1–3	Russia	25–14	16–25	23–25	21–25		85–89	Report

== Final standing ==
Rank	Team
1	Russia
2	France
3	Poland
4	Germany
5	Serbia
6	Bulgaria
7	Belgium
8	Finland

Qualified for the 2016 Summer Olympics
Qualified for the 2016 1st World Olympic Qualification Tournament

== Awards ==
- Most valuable player
  (Russia) Sergey Tetyukhin
- Best setter
  (France) Benjamin Toniutti
- Best outside spikers
  (France) Earvin N'Gapeth
  (Germany) Denys Kaliberda
- Best middle blockers
  (Germany) Marcus Böhme
  (Poland) Mateusz Bieniek
- Best opposite spiker
  (Russia) Maxim Mikhaylov
- Best libero
  (France) Jenia Grebennikov

== See also ==
- Volleyball at the 2016 Summer Olympics – Women's European qualification
