= Renato Sorriso =

Renato Luiz Lourenço Feliciano, commonly known as Renato Sorriso, is a popular Brazilian street cleaner and samba dancer. Beginning in 1995, he worked in Rio de Janeiro, for COMLURB (Companhia Municipal de Limpeza Urbana), the municipal urban cleaning company.

He earned the nickname in 1997 when working on cleaning the Samba Catwalk of Rio de Janeiro, during the parade of samba schools, began to samba with his broom. Though he received management admonition, due to public applause, his act was later not only permitted but became an added attraction in the Carioca Carnival.

In addition to regularly repeating the dance with his broom in the spacing between the schools' parade floats, Renato Sorriso paraded for Portela samba school in 2009, dressed as a malandro. He recorded TV commercials and appeared in samba shows.

Renato opened the transition program dedicated to Brazilian music during the 2012 Summer Olympics closing ceremony in London, then again in the final segment of the 2016 Summer Olympics closing ceremony in Rio de Janeiro.
