= Mariene de Castro =

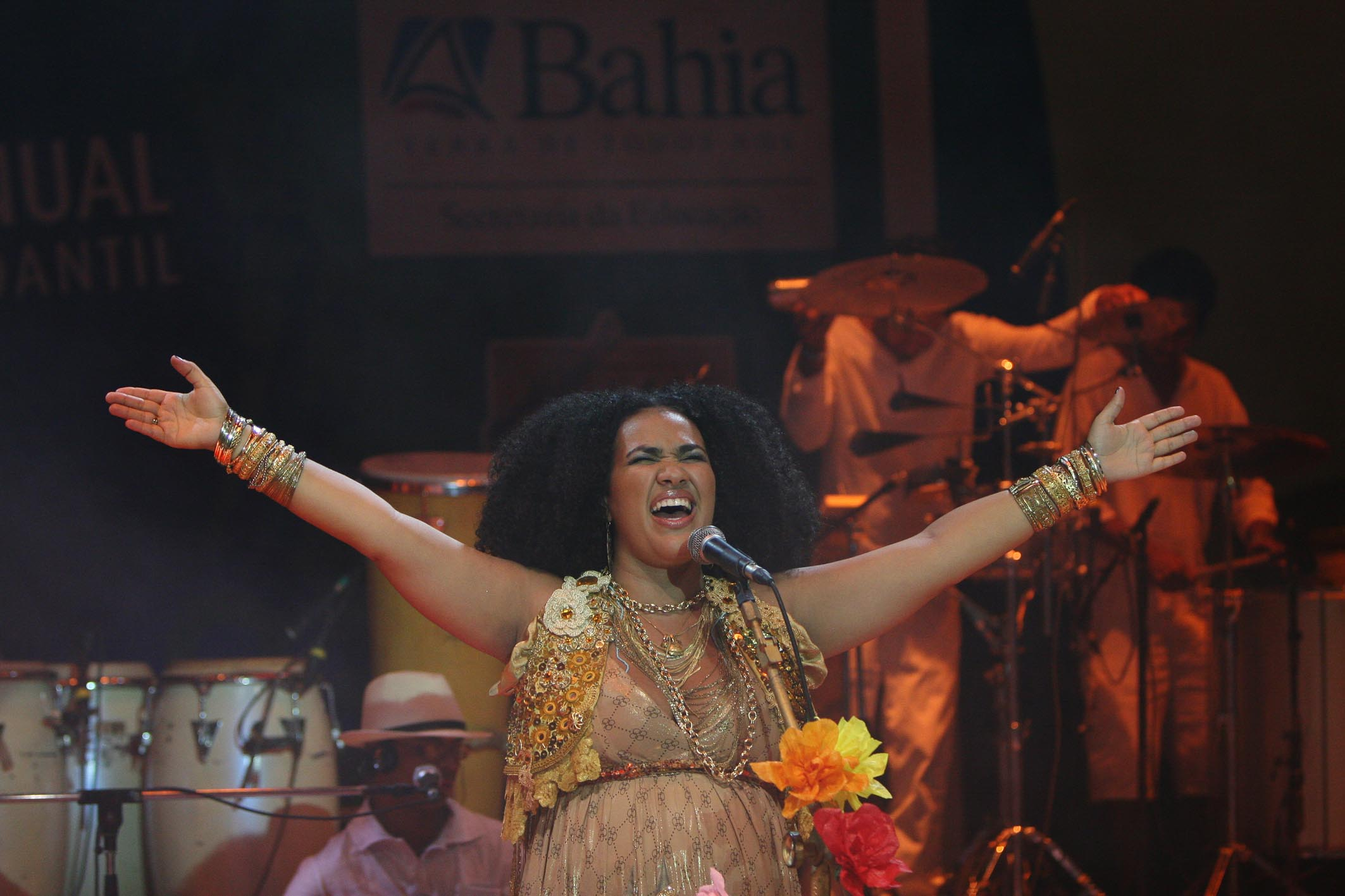

Background information
- Born: Mariene Bezerra de Castro; 12 May 1978 (age 48); Salvador da Bahia, Brazil
- Genres: Samba
- Occupations: Actress, ballet dancer, model, composer, musician
- Instruments: Vocal, prato
- Years active: 1997–present
- Label: Universal Music
- Website: www.marienedecastro.com.br
- influences: Edith do Prado, Edil Pacheco, Roque Ferreira, Maria Bethânia, Caetano Velloso, Beth Carvalho, Carlinhos Brown, Riachão, Nelson Rufino, Ederaldo Gentil, Bezerra de Menezes e Roberto Ribeiro

Mariene Bezerra de Castro (12 May 1978 in Salvador da Bahia) is a Brazilian musician. She is known for her revival of Northeastern Brazilian musical styles including maracatu and samba de roda.

Mariene began her professional career as a backing vocalist for Timbalada, Carlinhos Brown and Marcia Freire. She began her solo career in 1997. In 2001 she won a Caymmi Award for Best Artistic Production. Her first album was released in 2005. Mariene was made the queen of the 2007 Gay Pride parade in Salvador by the Gay Group of Bahia. She performed at the 2016 Rio Olympics closing ceremony with the song "Pelo Tempo Que Durar" originally by Marisa Monte in front of the Olympic Flame before it was extinguished.

== Discography ==
=== Studio albums ===
- 2005: Abre Caminho
- 2012: Tabaroinha
- 2014: Colheita

=== Live albums ===
- 2010: CD Santo de Casa - Ao Vivo
- 2011: DVD Santo de Casa - Ao Vivo
- 2013: CD Ser de Luz - Ao Vivo
- 2013: DVD Ser de Luz - Ao Vivo
