= Volleyball at the 2016 Summer Olympics – Men's African qualification =

2016 African Olympic Qualification Tournament
Tournament details
- Host country: Republic of the Congo
- City: Brazzaville
- Dates: 7–12 January
- Teams: 7 (from 1 confederation)
- Venue: 1 (in 1 host city)

Final positions
- Champions: Egypt (3rd title)
- Runners-up: Tunisia
- Third place: Algeria
- Fourth place: Cameroon

Tournament statistics
- Matches played: 14

The African Qualification Tournament for the 2016 Men's Olympic Volleyball Tournament was held in Brazzaville, Congo from 7 to 12 January 2016.

== Qualification ==
7 CAVB national teams which had not yet qualified to the 2016 Summer Olympics entered qualification.

- Algeria
- Cameroon
- Congo
- DR Congo
- Egypt
- Nigeria
- Tunisia

== Pools composition ==
Pool A	Pool B
Congo (Hosts)	Algeria
Egypt	Cameroon
Tunisia	DR Congo
	Nigeria

== Venue ==
- Henri Elende Hall, Brazzaville, Congo

== Pool standing procedure ==
1. Number of matches won
2. Match points
3. Sets ratio
4. Points ratio
5. Result of the last match between the tied teams

Match won 3–0 or 3–1: 3 match points for the winner, 0 match points for the loser
Match won 3–2: 2 match points for the winner, 1 match point for the loser

== Preliminary round ==
- All times are West Africa Time (UTC+01:00).

=== Pool A ===
Pos	Team	Pld	W	L	Pts	SW	SL	SR	SPW	SPL	SPR	Qualification
1	Egypt	2	2	0	6	6	1	6.000	175	136	1.287	Semifinals
2	Tunisia	2	1	1	3	3	3	1.000	137	135	1.015	Semifinals
3	Congo	2	0	2	0	1	6	0.167	134	175	0.766	5th place match

Date	Time		Score		Set 1	Set 2	Set 3	Set 4	Set 5	Total	Report
7 Jan	16:00	Tunisia	3–0	Congo	25–22	25–17	25–21			75–60	Result
8 Jan	16:00	Egypt	3–1	Congo	25–16	25–15	25–27	25–16		100–74	Result
9 Jan	18:00	Egypt	3–0	Tunisia	25–22	25–20	25–20			75–62	Result

=== Pool B ===
Pos	Team	Pld	W	L	Pts	SW	SL	SR	SPW	SPL	SPR	Qualification
1	Algeria	3	3	0	9	9	0	MAX	225	143	1.573	Semifinals
2	Cameroon	3	2	1	6	6	3	2.000	196	194	1.010	Semifinals
3	DR Congo	3	1	2	3	3	7	0.429	207	239	0.866	5th place match
4	Nigeria	3	0	3	0	1	9	0.111	198	225	0.880	

Date	Time		Score		Set 1	Set 2	Set 3	Set 4	Set 5	Total	Report
7 Jan	14:00	Cameroon	3–0	DR Congo	25–21	25–18	25–22			75–61	Result
7 Jan	18:00	Algeria	3–0	Nigeria	25–14	25–21	25–16			75–51	Result
8 Jan	14:00	DR Congo	3–1	Nigeria	21–25	26–24	28–26	25–14		100–89	Result
8 Jan	18:00	Cameroon	0–3	Algeria	17–25	13–25	16–25			46–75	Result
9 Jan	14:00	Algeria	3–0	DR Congo	25–17	25–18	25–11			75–46	Result
9 Jan	16:00	Nigeria	0–3	Cameroon	18–25	20–25	20–25			58–75	Result

== Final round ==
- All times are West Africa Time (UTC+01:00).

=== 5th–6th places ===
==== 5th place match ====
Date	Time		Score		Set 1	Set 2	Set 3	Set 4	Set 5	Total	Report
11 Jan	14:00	Congo	3–0	DR Congo	25–22	26–24	25–18			76–64	Result

=== Final four ===
Semifinals
11 January
Egypt	3
Cameroon	0
11 January
Algeria	2
Tunisia	3

Final
12 January
Egypt	3
Tunisia	2
3rd place match
12 January
Cameroon	2
Algeria	3

==== Semifinals ====
Date	Time		Score		Set 1	Set 2	Set 3	Set 4	Set 5	Total	Report
11 Jan	16:00	Egypt	3–0	Cameroon	25–22	25–17	25–19			75–58	Result
11 Jan	18:00	Algeria	2–3	Tunisia	26–24	22–25	25–15	26–28	13–15	112–107	Result

==== 3rd place match ====
Date	Time		Score		Set 1	Set 2	Set 3	Set 4	Set 5	Total	Report
12 Jan	16:00	Cameroon	2–3	Algeria	25–18	24–26	13–25	25–18	13–15	100–102	Result

==== Final ====
Date	Time		Score		Set 1	Set 2	Set 3	Set 4	Set 5	Total	Report
12 Jan	18:00	Egypt	3–2	Tunisia	25–19	20–25	25–18	19–25	16–14	105–101	Result

== Final standing ==
Rank	Team	Qualification
1	Egypt	2016 Summer Olympics
2	Tunisia	2016 2nd World Olympic; Qualification Tournament
3	Algeria	2016 2nd World Olympic; Qualification Tournament
4	Cameroon	
5	Congo	
6	DR Congo	
7	Nigeria	

== See also ==
- Volleyball at the 2016 Summer Olympics – Women's African qualification
