= Brazilian Volleyball Confederation =

Governing body of volleyball in Brazil

- Sport: Volleyball
- Jurisdiction: Brazil
- Abbreviation: CBV
- Founded: 1954
- Affiliation: FIVB
- Regional affiliation: CSV
- Headquarters: Rio de Janeiro, Brazil
- President: Radamés Lattari Filho
- Chairman: Neuri Barbier
- Men's coach: Bernardo Rezende
- Women's coach: José Roberto Guimarães

Official website
- www.cbv.com.br
- (Brazil)

The Brazilian Volleyball Confederation (Portuguese: Confederação Brasileira de Voleibol, CBV) is the governing body of volleyball and beach volleyball in Brazil. Formed in 1954, its headquarters are in Barra da Tijuca, Rio de Janeiro. The CBV is a member of the International Volleyball Federation (FIVB) and the South American Volleyball Confederation (CSV) and it is affiliated to the Brazilian Olympic Committee. It organizes both the men's and women's Brazilian Volleyball Superleague, which are the top level's volleyball competition in Brazil, and also organizes the Salonpas Cup, which is an international women's club cup competition played annually in Brazil. The organization also administrates the Brazil men's national volleyball team and the Brazil women's national volleyball team.

== Tournaments ==
- Brazilian Volleyball Superleague
- Brazilian Volleyball Cup
- Brazilian Volleyball Supercopa

== Presidents ==
Below is a list of all CBV presidents:

| # | Name | Term |
|---|---|---|
| 1. | Denis Rupet Hathaway | 1955-1957 |
| 2. | Abrahão Antônio Jaber | 1957-1959 |
| 3. | Paulo Monteiro Mendes | 1959-1961 |
| 4. | Roberto Moreira Calçada | 1961-1975 |
| 5. | Carlos Arthur Nuzman | 1975-1997 |
| 6. | Ary Graça | 1997–2013 |
| 7. | Walter Pitombo Laranjeiras | 2013–2023 |

== Affiliated state federations ==
All the Brazilian state federations are affiliated to the CBV:

| State | Federation |
|---|---|
| AC | Federação Acreana de Voleibol |
| AL | Federação Alagoana de Voleibol |
| AM | Federação Amazonense de Voleibol |
| AP | Federação Amapaense de Voleibol |
| BA | Federação Baiana de Volley-Ball |
| CE | Federação Cearense de Voleibol |
| DF | Federação Brasiliense de Voleibol |
| ES | Federação Espírito-Santense de Voleibol |
| GO | Entidade de Administração Goiana de Voleibol |
| MA | Federação Maranhense de Voleibol |
| MG | Federação Mineira de Voleibol |
| MT | Federação Matogrossense de Voleibol |
| MS | Federação de Volley-Ball do Mato Grosso do Sul |
| PA | Federação Paraense de Voleibol |
| PB | Federação Paraíbana de Voleibol |
| PE | Federação de Voleibol do Estado de Pernambuco |
| PI | Federação Piauiense de Voleibol |
| PR | Federação Paranaense de Voleibol |
| RJ | Federação de Volley-Ball do Rio de Janeiro |
| RN | Federação Norte-Riograndense de Voleibol |
| RO | Federação Rondoniense de Voleibol |
| RR | Federação Roraimense de Voleibol |
| RS | Federação Gaúcha de Volley-Ball |
| SC | Federação Catarinense de Voleibol |
| SE | Federação Sergipana de Volley-Ball |
| SP | Federação Paulista de Voleibol |
| TO | Federação Tocantinense de Voleibol |
