= Ary Graça =

Brazilian volleyball player (born 1943)

Ary S. Graça F^{o}
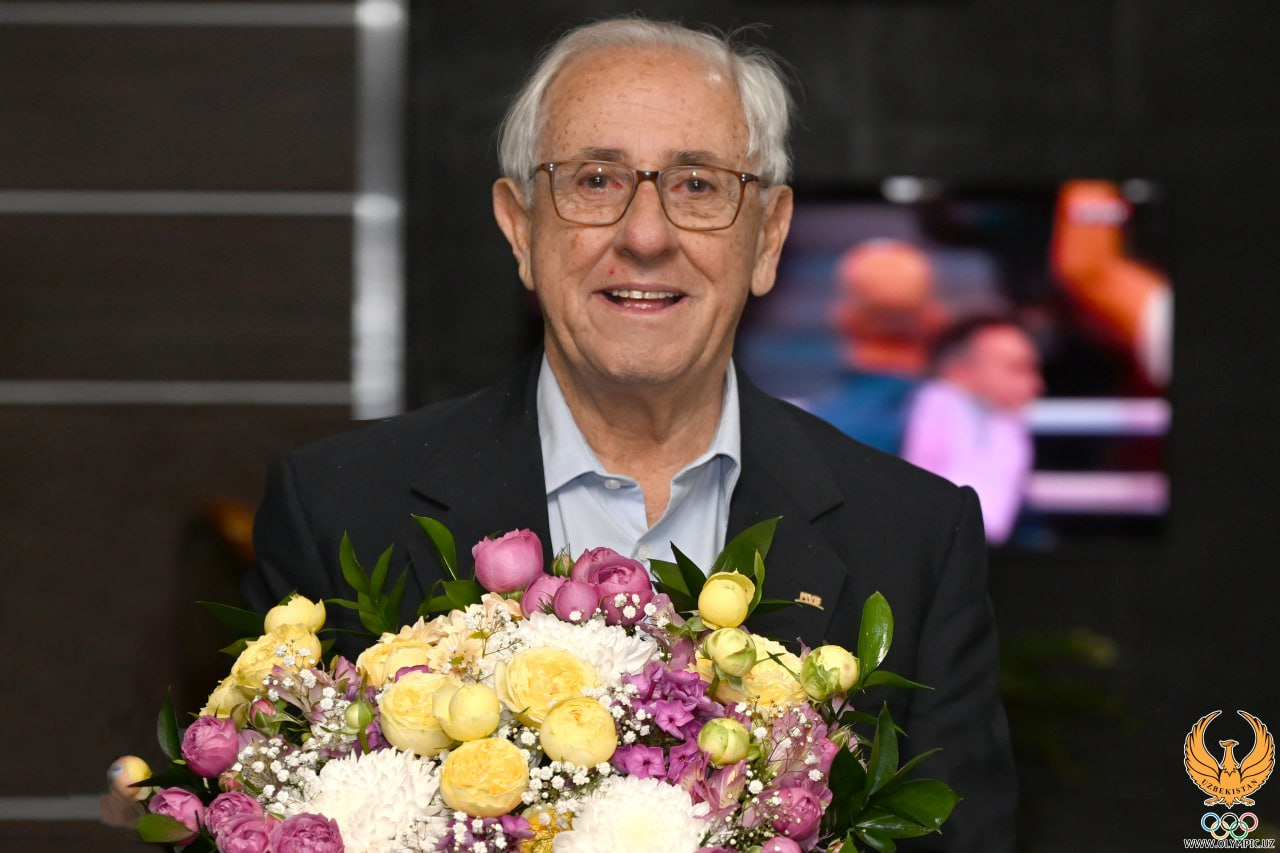

President of FIVB
- In office September 21, 2012 – November 16, 2024
- Preceded by: Wei Jizhong
- Succeeded by: Fabio Azevedo

President of the Brazilian Volleyball Confederation
- In office 1999–2012
- Preceded by: Carlos Nuzman
- Succeeded by: Walter Pitombo Laranjeiras

Personal details
- Born: Ary da Silva Graça Filho; 23 April 1943 (age 83) Rio de Janeiro, Brazil

Ary da Silva Graça Filho (born 23 April 1943) is a Brazilian former volleyball player and president of the Fédération Internationale de Volleyball (FIVB).

He was a member of Brazil's national team from 1963 to 1968. Before presidency of FIVB, Graça was President of the Confederación Sudamericana de Voleibol (CSV) from 2003 to 2012 and Brazilian Volleyball Confederation (CBV) from 1997 to 2012. During the 33rd FIVB world congress at Anaheim, USA on September 21, 2012, Graça elected as the fourth FIVB president. He is currently a member of the IOC Marketing Commission.

Graça holds a Bachelor's degree in Law, and speaks Portuguese natively, as well as English, French, Spanish and Italian.

In 2021, the Rio de Janeiro police said they are investigating Graça for tax fraud, money laundering and identity fraud. In 2022, the Second Criminal Court of the Court of Justice of the State of Rio de Janeiro unanimously cancelled the criminal action, as it "confirmed that the latest allegations were the same as previous allegations which were proven to be false, and from which Graça was exonerated by the Public Prosecutor of the State of Rio de Janeiro in 2019".

Sporting positions
Preceded by Wei Jizhong	President of FIVB; 2012–2024	Succeeded by Fabio Azevedo
Preceded by Carlos Nuzman	President of the Brazilian Volleyball Confederation; 1996–2012	Succeeded by Walter Pitombo Laranjeiras
