= Rio 2016 Organising Committee for the Olympic and Paralympic Games =

Brazilian sports organization

- Type: Company limited by guarantee
- Headquarters: Rio de Janeiro
- Chairman: Carlos Arthur Nuzman
- Website: www.rio2016.com

The Rio 2016 Organising Committee for the Olympic and Paralympic Games (Portuguese: Comitê Organizador dos Jogos Olímpicos e Paralímpicos Rio 2016) was the organizing committee for the 2016 Summer Olympic and Paralympic Games in Brazil. It was also known as the Rio 2016 Organising Committee (Comitê Organizador Rio 2016) or simply Rio 2016.

== Board members ==
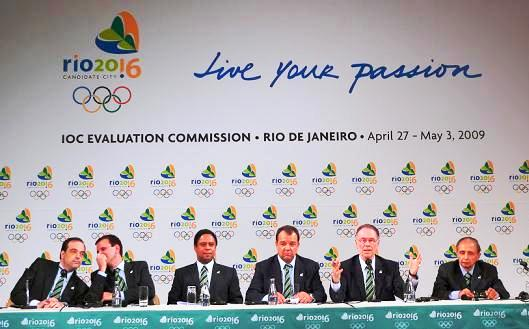
Nuzman (second from left), at a press conference (29 April 2009)

The board members were:

- Carlos Arthur Nuzman - President
- Marco Aurélio Costa Vieira
- Leonardo Gryner
- Andrew Parsons
- Edson Menezes
- Bernard Rajzman
