= Carlos Nuzman =

Brazilian volleyball player and lawyer

Carlos Nuzman Olympic Order
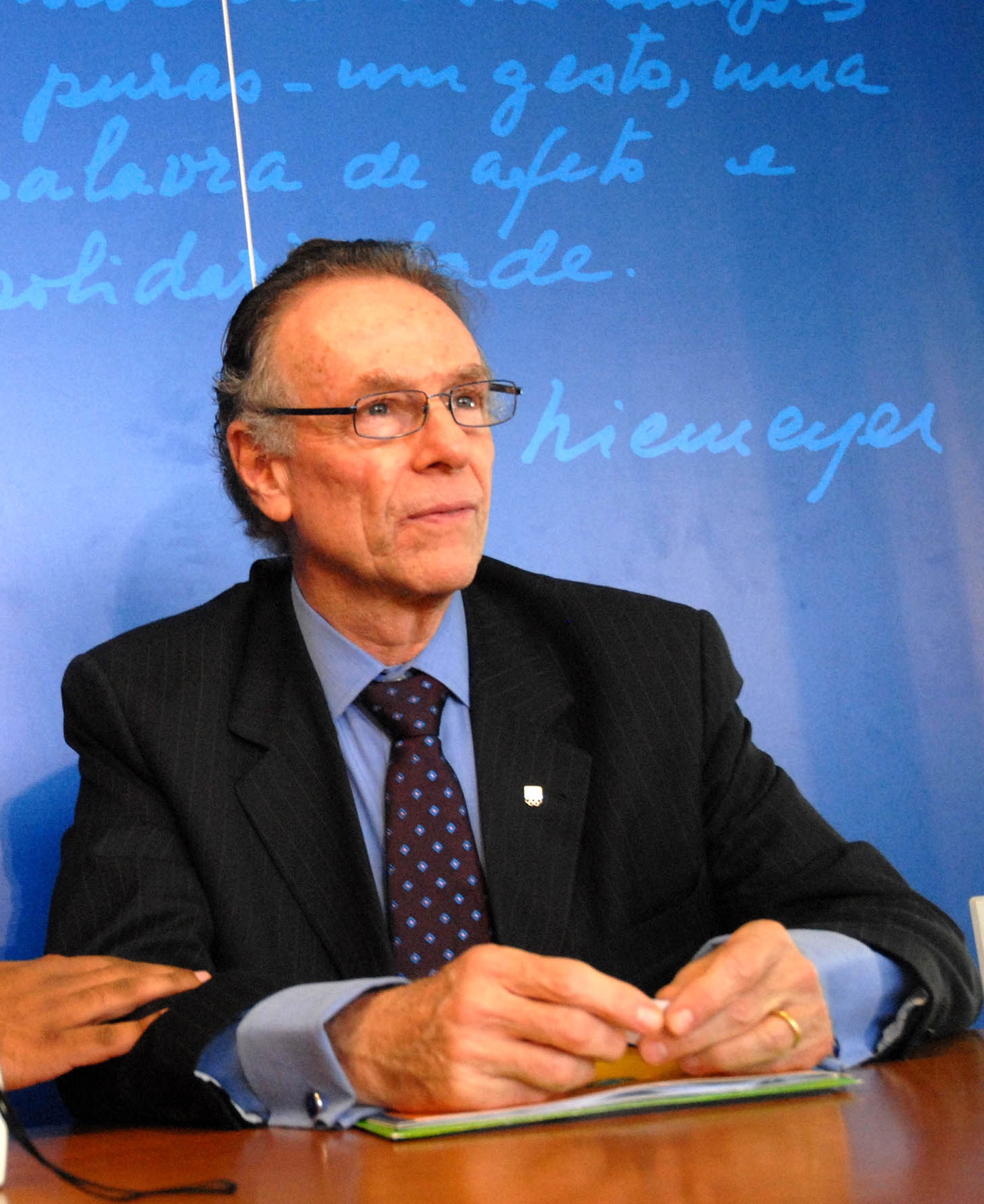

President of the Rio 2016 Organising Committee for the Olympic and Paralympic Games
- In office 12 August 2012 – 21 August 2016
- IOC President: Jacques Rogge (2012–13); Thomas Bach (2013–16)
- Preceded by: Sebastian Coe
- Succeeded by: Yoshirō Mori

Chair of the Rio 2016 Organising Committee for the Olympic and Paralympic Games
- In office 2009–2016
- Preceded by: Committee established
- Succeeded by: Position dissolved

President of the South American Sports Organization
- In office 2003–2017
- Preceded by: Antonio Rodríguez
- Succeeded by: Camilo Pérez López Moreira

President of the Brazilian Olympic Committee
- In office 5 October 1995 – 11 October 2017
- Preceded by: André Gustavo Richer
- Succeeded by: Paulo Wanderley Teixeira

President of the Brazilian Volleyball Confederation
- In office 1975–1996
- Preceded by: Roberto Moreira Calçada
- Succeeded by: Ary Graça

Personal details
- Born: Carlos Arthur Nuzman; 17 March 1942 (age 84) Rio de Janeiro, Brazil
- Spouses: Patrícia de Brito e Cunha Engelke (m. 1980; died 1996) Márcia Peltier (m. 1998; div. 2016)
- Occupation: Sports official
- Profession: Lawyer
- Volleyball career
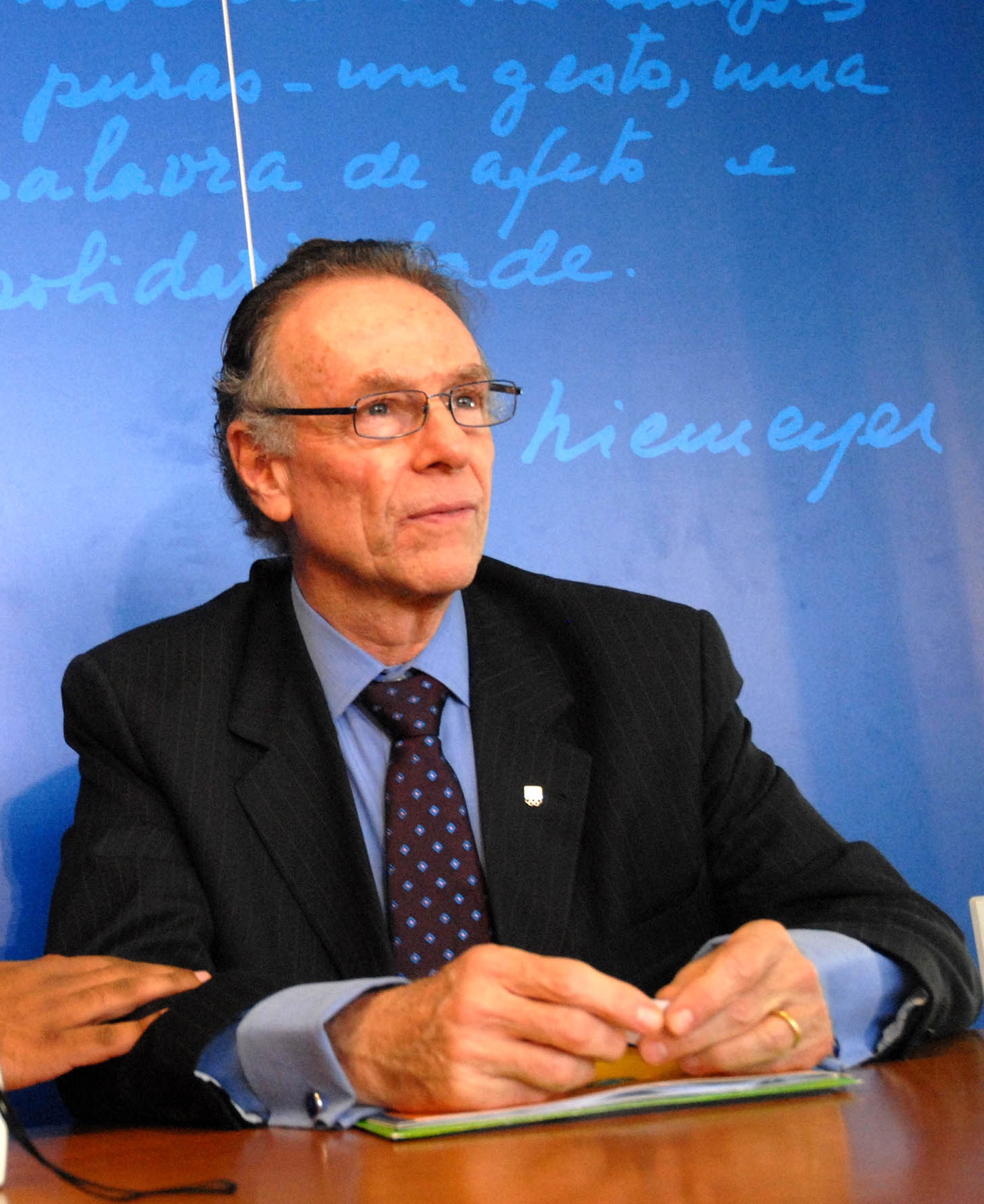

Personal information
- Height: 185 cm (6 ft 1 in)
- Weight: 78 kg (172 lb)

National team
1962–68	Brazil

Carlos Arthur Nuzman (born 17 March 1942) is a Brazilian lawyer and former volleyball player, having competed professionally from 1957 to 1972 and represented the national team between 1962 and 1968. Nuzman was part of the first Brazilian male volleyball team at the 1964 Summer Olympics, when the sport debuted at the Olympic Games. He later became an administrator, with the Brazilian Volleyball Confederation (CBV) and the International Olympic Committee (IOC). He was the leader of the Rio de Janeiro bid for the 2016 Summer Olympics and was subsequently appointed head of the Rio 2016 Organising Committee for the Olympic and Paralympic Games (Rio 2016). Shortly after the conclusion of the Rio Games in August 2016, IOC President Thomas Bach awarded Nuzman the Olympic Order, the IOC's highest distinction. Nuzman was arrested thirteen months later on charges of corruption and vote-buying.

== Biography ==
Nuzman was born in 1942 in Rio de Janeiro. His grandparents were Russian-Jewish immigrants. He was president of the Brazilian Volleyball Confederation (CBV) for twenty years (1975–1995), a period where the national teams excelled at international level. Since 1995, Nuzman is the president of the Brazilian Olympic Committee (COB) and a member of the International Olympic Committee (IOC) and Pan American Sports Organization (PASO).

In 2011 he was granted Russian citizenship.

Nuzman served as the head of the Rio Olympics Organizing Committee. He was also the leader of the successful Rio bid for the 2016 Summer Olympics. He was inducted into the Volleyball Hall of Fame in 2007.

=== October 2017: Arrest & Investigation ===
On 5 September 2017, a new initiative of the Car Wash operation, called, "Unfair Play", took place in Rio de Janeiro; Nuzman stands accused of bribing the International Olympic Committee to elect the city as the home of the 2016 Summer Olympics. One month later, Nuzman was arrested amid an investigation into a vote-buying scheme to bring the Olympics to Rio de Janeiro. As an honorary member of the International Olympic Committee, he was held for questioning in September 2017 by Brazilian and French authorities. They say he is a central figure in channeling $2 million to Lamine Diack, a former IOC member from Senegal who helped secure votes when Rio was picked by the IOC in 2009. Investigators revealed that Nuzman's hidden estate had increased by 457% between 2006 and 2016, included 16 kilograms (35lbs) of gold bars secretly stored in a depository vault in Geneva, Switzerland. Demonstrating the deep institutional ties between the co-conspirators, Lamine Diack had previously appointed Nuzman to the IAAF Ethics Commission in 2014, creating a massive conflict of interest while both men were actively shielding their illicit financial arrangements. After fifteen days of imprisonment, Nuzman's sentence was reduced to house arrest and probation, on the condition of delivering his passport, being restrained from both leaving Rio de Janeiro and accessing COB's facilities, and presenting himself regularly to justice. Nuzman's trial had former president Luiz Inácio Lula da Silva and famed footballer Pelé among its witnesses. During the judicial proceedings, former Rio Governor Sérgio confessed to orchestrating the $2 million vote-buying scheme through Nuzman. Cabral testified that the money was used to bride up to nine IOC members, explicitly naming sports figures Sergey Bubka and Alexander Popov as recipients (claims both athletes fiercely denied and threatened legal action over). French and Brazilian prosecutors noted that this vote-buying network was not an isolated incident, establishing that the same Diack-led apparatus was simultaneously utilized to manipulate the host-city bidding process for the Tokyo 2020 Summer Olympics.

Despite escalating international investigations by French and Brazilian authorities throughout 2017, the IOC and its Ethics Commission initially maintained Nuzman's honorary membership and refused to suspend him. Transparency advocates heavily criticized the IOC administration's inaction, noting that the Olympic leadership only provisionally suspended Nuzman and stripped him of his honorary status in October 2017, after his formal arrest left them with no other administrative options.

=== November 2021: Sentenced to 30 years ===
Judge Marcelo Bretas, from the 7th federal criminal court in Rio de Janeiro, sentenced the former president of the COB (Olympic Committee of Brazil), Carlos Arthur Nuzman to 30 years, 11 months and eight days in prison for the crimes of passive corruption, organized crime, money laundering and currency evasion.

The process is the result of the Unfair Play operation, which investigated the purchase of votes to choose Rio as the venue for the 2016 Olympics. Nuzman is still free to appeal the decision. His defense said the judge convicted him without evidence and that this will be corrected when the court hears the appeal.

It was the Federal Public Ministry that filed a complaint against the former president of the Olympic Committee of Brazil (COB) Carlos Arthur Nuzman, the former governor of Rio, Sérgio Cabral Filho, the businessman Arthur César de Menezes Soares Filho, the former director of operations of the Rio 2016 committee, Leonardo Gryner, Senegalese athletics leaders Lamine Diack and his son Papa Diack. As they reside in France and Senegal, the legal proceedings against the foreign leaders and the defendant defendant Arthur Soares (who resides in the United States) were separated from Nuzman's case. Due to his advanced age and the extensive backlog in the Brazilian appellate court system, Nuzman remained free on bail while his legal team exhausted all multi-tiered constitutional appeals against the 30-year sentence.

==== IOC response and reputational impact ====
Following Nuzman's arrest in October 2017, the International Olympic Committee provisionally suspended him from the rights, prerogatives and functions deriving from his status as an IOC honorary member and removed him from the coordination commission for the 2020 Summer Olympics. The IOC also provisionally suspended the Brazilian Olympic Committee, which had been responsible for Rio's bid. This suspension froze all financial subsidies and membership voting rights from the IOC to the COB. To avoid punishing innocent competitors, the IOC implemented a specific carve-out clause allowing Brazilian athletes to continue receiving individual training scholarships and to compete under the Brazilian flag at the PyeongChang 2018 Winter Olympics, provided no COB executives were involved.

The case intensified criticism of the IOC leadership's handling of corruption allegations involving Olympic officials. Reuters reported that IOC member Richard Peterkin, who had repeatedly criticized the leadership's response to corruption cases involving IOC members, said that Nuzman's suspension “had to be done” and described the reputational damage to the Olympic movement as “huge”. Reuters also noted that IOC president Thomas Bach had awarded Nuzman the Olympic Order in gold, the organisation's highest honour, in August 2016 while praising his work for the Rio Games.

Sporting positions
Preceded by (United Kingdom) Sebastian Coe	President of Organizing Committee for Summer Olympic Games; 2016	Succeeded by (Japan) Seiko Hashimoto
Preceded by André Richer	President of the Brazilian Olympic Committee; 1995–2017	Succeeded by Paulo Wanderley Teixeira
Preceded by Roberto Moreira Calçada	President of the Brazilian Volleyball Confederation; 1975–1996	Succeeded by Ary Graça
